= 88-Keys production discography =

The following is a list of songs produced, co-produced, or remixed by 88-Keys.

| Year | Artist | Album | Song(s) | Credit | Record labels |
|---|---|---|---|---|---|
| 1998 | Black Star | Mos Def and Talib Kweli Are Black Star | "Thieves in the Night" | Producer | Rawkus/UMVD |
| 1998 | Various Artists | Lyricist Lounge, Volume One | "Intro" (performed by De La Soul) "Bathroom Cipher" (performed by J-Treds, Kwest, Thirstin Howl III, I.G. Off & Hazadous) | Producer | Rawkus |
| 1999 | Macy Gray | On How Life Is | (Disc 1) "Why Didn't You Call Me 88-Keys Remix" | Producer | Epic |
| 1999 | Mos Def | Black On Both Sides | "Love" "Speed Law" "May–December" (co-producer) | Producer | Rawkus/UMVD |
| 2000 | DJ Spinna | The Beat Suite | "The Scott Steinway Trio (Montreaux '76)" | Producer | Urban Theory |
| 2000 | Various Artists | Hip Hop For Respect EP | "A Tree Never Grown" (performed by A.L. Skillz, Fre, Kofi Taha, Rubix, Invincible, Wordsworth, Tame One, Jane Doe, J-Live, Grafh & Mos Def) | Producer | Rawkus |
| 2001 | Various Artists | Underground Airplay Version 1.0 | "Bi-sexual" (performed by Jane Doe) | Producer | MIC Media |
| 2001 | Beanie Sigel | The Reason | "Watch Your Bitches" | Producer | Roc-A-Fella Records / Def Jam |
| 2001 | J-Live | The Best Part | "Got What It Takes" "Don't Play" "Play" | Producer | Triple Threat Productions |
| 2001 | Truth Enola | No Matter What 12" | "Ill Lovin' II" (featuring Jean Grae) | Producer | |
| 2001 | Grafh | Keeps It Gangsta, 12" | "Keeps It Gangsta" "Gimme That" | Producer | Full Blast Music |
| 2002 | 3LW | A Girl Can Mack | "High Fashion (Be Yourself)" (Japanese bonus track) | Producer | Sony |
| 2002 | Big Ward | Volume 1: Family Input | "What Would You Do" "This World" "Midwest Swinging" "Midwest Sticky" "Ooh Ooh Ah" | Producer | Trio Records |
| 2002 | Scratch | Embodiment of Instrumentation | "Sumthin' That U Missin'" | Co-Producer | Rope A Dope |
| 2002 | Musiq | Juslisen | "Babygirl" "Intermission (Juslisen)" | Producer | Def Soul |
| 2003 | Musiq | Soulstar | "Dontstop" "Her" | Producer | Def Jam |
| 2003 | Schoolz of Thought | From Thought to Finish | "eVERYthHINGSaLLrIGHT (rIGHTnOW)" "It'z Going Down, Now (Feel Good)" | Producer | Full Blast Music |
| 2003 | Kindred the Family Soul | Surrender to Love | "Clap Your Hands (Interlude)" | Producer | Hidden Beach |
| 2004 | Consequence | Take 'Em To The Cleaners | "Doctor, Doctor" "Train" "The Hulk" | Producer | Sure Shot Recordings |
| 2004 | The Pharcyde | Humboldt Beginnings | "The Uh-Huh" "Choices" | Producer | Chapter One Entertainment |
| 2004 | Mos Def | The New Danger | "Champion Requiem" | Producer | Rawkus/Geffen |
| 2005 | Talib Kweli | Right About Now: The Official Sucka Free Mix CD | "Right About Now" | Producer | Koch Records |
| 2005 | Consequence | A Tribe Called Quence: 1995 - 2004 | "Rock-N-Roll (Remix)" | Producer | Draft Records |
| 2008 | Random | Patches and Glue EP | "Inbox (electric Remixation)" | Producer/Performer | RAHM Nation |
| 2008 | Braille | The IV Edition | "Main Squeeze" | Producer | Koch Records |
| 2008 | 88-Keys | Adam's Case Files Mixtape | (entire mixtape) | Producer/Performer | Decon Records |
| 2008 | 88-Keys | Stay Up! (Viagra) Prescription Pack – EP | (entire mixtape) | Producer/Performer | Decon Records |
| 2008 | 88-Keys | The Death of Adam | (entire album) | Executive producer/Performer | Decon Records |
| 2008 | Various Artists | Fresh Rhymes & Videotape, Vol. 1 | "Fresh Rhymes and Videotape Anthem" (performed by The Alchemist, Aceyalone, Evidence & Rakaa of Dilated Peoples & 88-Keys) "I'm Like" (performed by 88-Keys & Mars Whiteman) | Producer/Performer | Decon Records |
| 2009 | 88-Keys | | "Baggage Claim" | Performer | Decon Records |
| 2009 | Skin & Bones | | "Lemonade" (performed by Skin & Bones, 88-Keys & Chris Chu of The Morning Benders) | Performer | |
| 2011 | Talib Kweli | Gutter Rainbows | "After the Rain" | Producer | Blacksmith Records |
| 2011 | Jay-Z & Kanye West | Watch the Throne | "No Church In The Wild" (featuring Frank Ocean) | Producer | Roc-A-Fella Records, Roc Nation, and Def Jam |
| 2014 | Theophilus London | Vibes | "Can't Stop" (featuring Kanye West) | Co-Producer | Warner Bros. Records |
| 2015 | Action Bronson | Mr. Wonderful | "City Boy Blues" (featuring C.S. Armstrong) | Producer | Atlantic Records |
| 2016 | Sia | This Is Acting | "Reaper" | Producer | Monkey Puzzle Records, RCA |
| 2016 | Frank Ocean | Endless | "Hublots" | Producer | Fresh Produce, Def Jam |
| 2016 | Hodgy | Fireplace: TheNotTheOtherSide | "Final Hour" (featuring Busta Rhymes) | Producer | Odd Future, Columbia |
| 2017 | Talib Kweli & Styles P | The Seven | "Teleprompter" | Producer | |
| 2017 | Your Old Droog | Packs | "Rapman" | Producer | |
| 2017 | Homeboy Sandman | Veins | "As Long As You Know" | Producer | |
| 2019 | 88-Keys | Non-album single | "That's Life" (featuring Mac Miller and Sia) | Producer | Warner Records |
| 2021 | Kanye West | Donda | "Jail" "Remote Control" (co-producer) "Heaven and Hell" "New Again" (additional producer) "Jail, Pt. 2" | Co-Producer | GOOD, Def Jam |
| 2022 | Pusha T | It's Almost Dry | "Diet Coke" | Producer | GOOD, Def Jam |
| 2024 | ¥$ (Kanye West and Ty Dolla Sign) | Vultures 1 | "Back to Me" "Hoodrat" "Paperwork" "Fuk Sumn" "Problematic" "King" | Producer | YZY |
| 2024 | ¥$ (Kanye West and Ty Dolla Sign) | Vultures 2 | "My Soul" | Producer | YZY |
