= Beg Forgiveness =

2024 song by Kanye West and Ty Dolla Sign

Song by ¥$

from the album Vultures 1
- Released: February 10, 2024
- Length: 6:08
- Label: YZY
- Songwriters: Ye; Tyrone Griffin, Jr.; Faouzia Ouihya; Quentin Miller; Latia Lindley; Anthony Kilhoffer; Berrington Hendricks; London Holmes; Tiwan Raybon; Joseph Goddard; Valentina Pappalardo; John Beck
- Producers: Ye; Ty Dolla Sign; JPEGMafia; London on da Track; Anthony Kilhoffer; Vitals

Audio
- "Beg Forgiveness" on YouTube

"Beg Forgiveness" (stylized in all caps) is a song by the American hip-hop supergroup ¥$, composed of rapper Kanye West and singer Ty Dolla Sign. It was released as track 13 from their debut collaborative album, Vultures 1 (2024). It features vocals from fellow American singer Chris Brown. The song's lyrics focus on mortality, acceptance in death, and the legacy of West's children. "Beg Forgiveness" is heavily based on Joe Goddard’s 2011 single "Gabriel", borrowing multiple elements from it.

== Background and composition ==
In November 2023, Kanye West and Ty Dolla Sign delivered a surprise performance of their single "Vultures" with fellow rappers Bump J and Lil Durk at a Dubai nightclub while Chris Brown was present. On February 1, 2024, the duo shared a track list for the album that included a feature from Brown. West and Brown had previously collaborated on various tracks, including "Down" in 2007 and "Waves" in 2016. For Vultures 1, Brown contributed vocals to "Beg Forgiveness".

In the lyrics of the song, West raps about his hopes for his children to live special lives. He mentions his own mortality, expressing fulfillment with his accomplishments if he was to pass away. Ty Dolla Sign belts at the end of the song: "Say you wanna make amends before I go / Now you wanna put your heart on the line."

== Reception ==
"Beg Forgiveness" was met with generally positive reviews from critics. Writing for HotNewHipHop, Zachary Horvath praised the song's production, highlighting contributions made by JPEGMafia and London on da Track. Horvath added that the song "is one of the few serious moments on the LP, and this may be the strongest of that bunch." On a separate list, the outlet cited Chris Brown on "Beg Forgiveness" as the second best feature on Vultures 1, beat only by Freddie Gibbs' feature on "Back to Me". Michael Saponara of Billboard placed the song 16th on his list of the best to worst Vultures 1 songs, the lowest ranking on the list. He cites misuse of Chris Brown as a feature, believing that the song should've ultimately "been kept in the files". In an otherwise negative review of Vultures 1, Edward Bowser of Soul In Stereo said "Beg Forgiveness" deserved credit, as despite it being "the usual 'you [sic] miss me when I'm gone' track we've heard a million times", the songs production and vocal effects "do a lot to carry the story [of the album] forward."

== Charts ==
Chart performance for "Beg Forgiveness"
Chart (2024)	Peak position
Australia (ARIA)	93
Australia Hip Hop/R&B (ARIA)	27
Canada Hot 100 (Billboard)	54
Global 200 (Billboard)	72
Iceland (Tónlistinn)	26
Lithuania (AGATA)	46
Portugal (AFP)	85
UK Indie (Official Charts)	18
US Billboard Hot 100	65
US Hot R&B/Hip-Hop Songs (Billboard)	30
