= Paperwork (song) =

2024 song by Kanye West and Ty Dolla Sign featuring Quavo

Song by ¥$ featuring Quavo

from the album Vultures 1
- Released: February 10, 2024
- Genre: Hip-hop; Funk carioca
- Length: 2:25
- Label: YZY
- Songwriters: Ye; Tyrone Griffin Jr.; Quavious Marshall; Charles Njapa; Kasseem Dean; Nasir Pemberton; Samuel Lindley; Malik Jones; Anthony Clemons Jr.; Bruno Da Costa; Victor Maciel; Leonardo Yasmil; Aderli Ramirez
- Producers: Ye; 88-Keys; Swizz Beatz; Digital Nas; The Legendary Traxster

"Paperwork" (stylized in all caps) is a song by the American hip-hop superduo ¥$, composed of rapper Kanye West and singer Ty Dolla Sign, from their debut studio album, Vultures 1 (2024). It features vocals from fellow rapper Quavo. The artists wrote the song with 88-Keys, Swizz Beats, Digital Nas, the Legendary Traxster, Malik Yusef, and Ant Clemons, with the former four producing it alongside the duo. The track includes a sample of DJ Roca and DJ Vitinho Beat's "Montagem Faz Macete 3.0". At Rolling Loud 2024, West and Ty Dolla Sign performed the song with Quavo.

== Background ==
In February 2024, West reposted a video to Instagram Stories of former Migos member Quavo and fellow rapper Rich the Kid shooting a music video at a game of the Atlanta Hawks. Quavo was reported to be featured on multiple tracks of Vultures 1 at the time, having appeared on previewed versions of "Fuk Sumn" and "Back to Me". "Paperwork" is the only track on the final release to have a verse from Quavo, as his placement on "Fuk Sumn" was replaced by Travis Scott. During a listening event for the album on February 8, 2024, "Paperwork" was previewed with a sample of "Montagem Faz Macete 3.0" by DJ Roca and DJ Vitinho Beat. DJ Roca posted Instagram Stories showing his emotion over the sample, while numerous Brazilians re shared videos of the event in excitement for the usage of funk. West and Ty Dolla Sign performed "Paperwork" live with Quavo at Rolling Loud in 2024, as they walked around the stage together.

== Composition ==
Musically, "Paperwork" combines elements of hip-hop and Brazilian funk.

== Critical reception ==
"Paperwork" received generally favorable reviews from music critics. Paul A. Thompson of Pitchfork wrote that although its use of Brazilian funk "suggests little beyond the vague idea that he should dabble in Brazilian funk—there is enough commitment behind the boards to sell nearly anything." Calling it the fourteenth best song from Vultures 1, Billboard's Michael Saponara complimented Quavo's feature, saying that he "does an admirable job outside of his comfort zone", but was unsure why it made the album instead of songs that were better received during listening events, such as "Everybody", "Time Moving Slow", and "River". At HotNewHipHop, Wyatt Westlake deemed Quavo's feature the third best guest appearance on the album, lauding how out of the three artists, he sounds the most comfortable over the song's "abrasive" beat.

== Charts ==
Chart performance for "Paperwork"
Chart (2024)	Peak position
Australia (ARIA)	80
US Hot Rap Songs (Billboard)	24
Australia Hip Hop/R&B (ARIA)	23
Canada Hot 100 (Billboard)	53
Global 200 (Billboard)	57
Iceland (Tónlistinn)	21
Latvia (LAIPA)	15
Lithuania (AGATA)	36
Portugal (AFP)	61
UK Indie (Official Charts)	16
US Billboard Hot 100	64
US Hot R&B/Hip-Hop Songs (Billboard)	29
