= New Body =

Unreleased song by Kanye West and Ty Dolla Sign

Song by ¥$
- Recorded: September 2018 – 2024
- Studio: Electric Lady, New York City
- Genre: Hip-hop; dirty rap; progressive rap
- Songwriters: Kanye West; Onika Maraj; Tyrone Griffin Jr.; Kevin Gomringer; Tim Gomringer; Ronald Spence Jr.; Aswad Asif
- Producers: Kanye West; Cubeatz; Ronny J; AyoAA

"New Body" is an unreleased song by American hip-hop superduo ¥$, composed of rapper Kanye West and singer Ty Dolla Sign. Originally recorded in 2018, it first contained a guest appearance by rapper and singer Nicki Minaj. Lyrically, the song debunks body shaming and the stigma surrounding plastic surgery; portions of West's lyrics are unintelligible. It was originally slated for inclusion on West's album Yandhi in late 2018, which was never released. It was then reworked with Christian-themed lyrics for West's ninth studio album Jesus Is King (2019); this version omitted Minaj in favor of Ty Dolla Sign, and was later previewed at listening parties and subsequently leaked. The song was also excluded from Jesus Is King due to creative differences with West and Minaj. In June 2020, the latter expressed interest in releasing the song after it became viral on TikTok.

Since its online leak in July 2019, "New Body" has received positive reviews and was noted as a highlight among other Yandhi tracks; however, the leak containing reworked Christian lyrics was tepidly received. In January 2022, Minaj announced plans to work on getting the song on her fifth studio album (2023), although this never came to fruition. In December 2023, the song was included on the first listening party and track listing for West and Ty Dolla Sign's collaborative album Vultures 1, although Minaj declined for her verse to be included on its official release. The album was released the following February, and once more, "New Body" was excluded. Frustrated, West, according to talent manager YesJulz, sent the song to rappers Ice Spice and Doja Cat to record on the portions of the song otherwise performed by Minaj. According to West himself, the former's recording failed to release due to forestalling by her management team.

== Background and recording ==
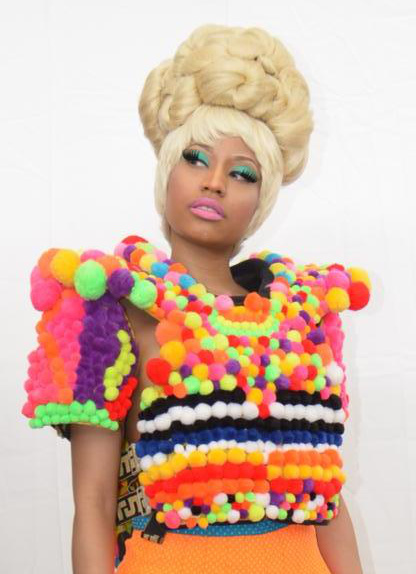
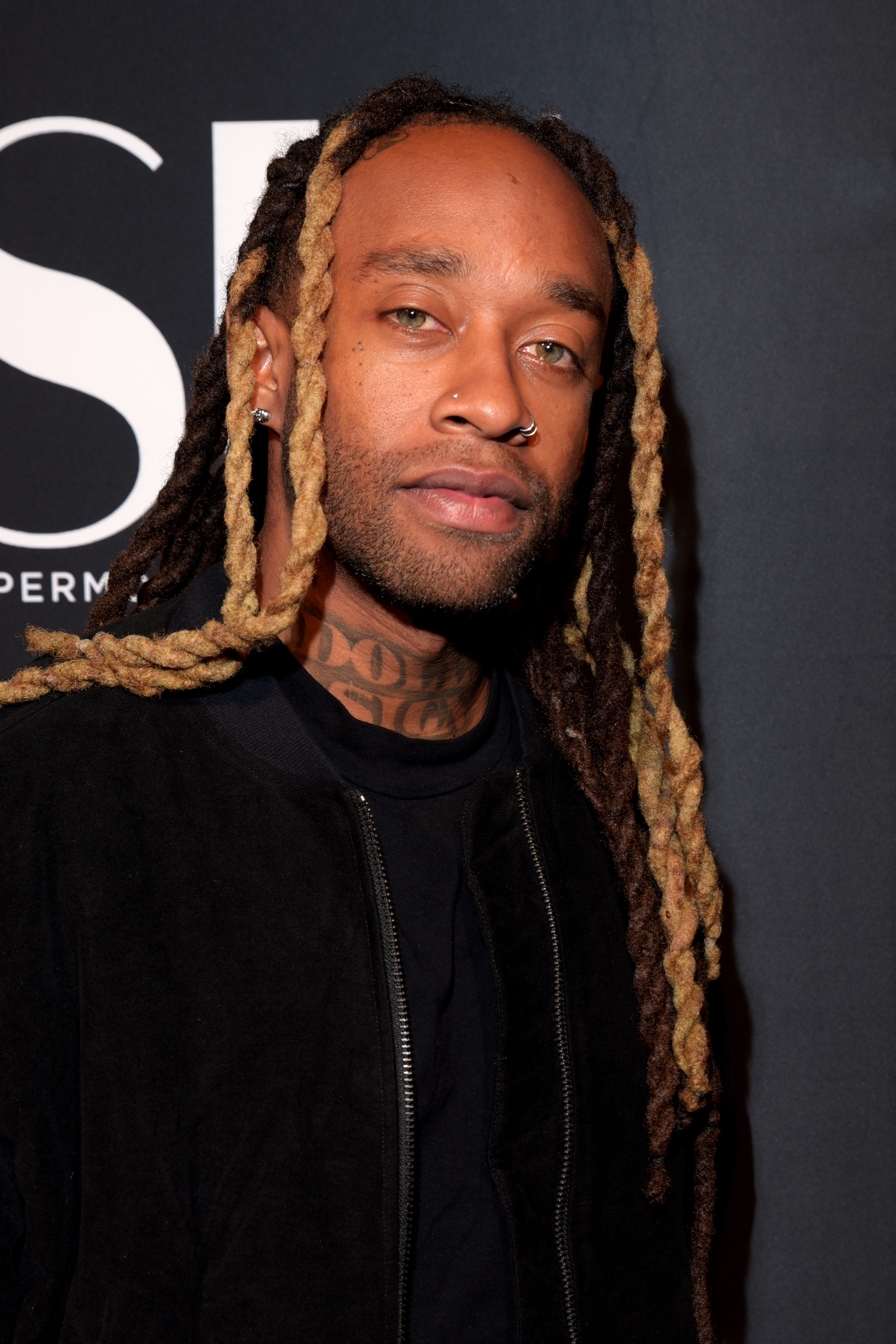
Nicki Minaj (left) and Ty Dolla Sign (right) previously appeared together on Kanye West's song "Violent Crimes" (2018).

Rapper Nicki Minaj was previously prominently featured on West's fifth studio album My Beautiful Dark Twisted Fantasy (2010) and provided a voice memo for his eighth studio album Ye (2018), as well as West appearing on Minaj's debut studio album, Pink Friday. American singer Ty Dolla Sign was also featured on Ye, along with The Life of Pablo (2016) and Kids See Ghosts (2018). The song "Violent Crimes" from Ye features vocals from Ty Dolla Sign, along with American singer 070 Shake, and a voice memo from Minaj.

=== Creation during Yandhi ===
On September 9, 2018, West was spotted recording music with American rapper 6ix9ine. The two later flew to Colombia to record music together. On September 17, 2018, West announced his ninth studio album Yandhi, just three months after the release of his previous solo album Ye, revealing the cover art and initial release date of September 29, 2018. On September 27, West visited The Fader headquarters to preview new music from Yandhi. Songs previewed included vocals from Ty Dolla Sign and 6ix9ine. West took out a pocket dictionary and read the definition of the word "artificial", explaining his view that "a woman’s pussy count goes back to zero" after having any plastic surgery procedures done. The Fader reported that this explanation was related to the song that featured 6ix9ine. West would later feature on two tracks from 6ix9ine's debut studio album Dummy Boy (2018): "Kanga" and "Mama", with the latter also featuring Minaj.

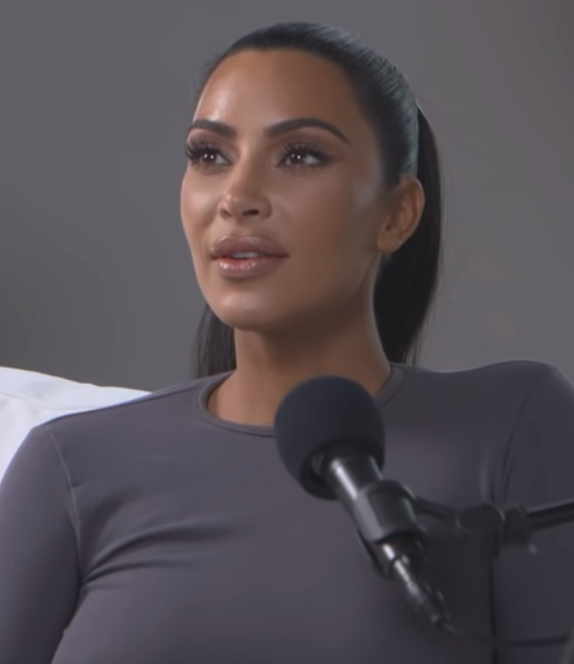
West's then wife Kim Kardashian (pictured) coordinated Nicki Minaj's guest appearance on the song.

While West was in New York City finishing up Yandhi for the season 44 premiere of Saturday Night Live, West's ex-wife Kim Kardashian coordinated to get Minaj featured on "New Body". Before recording her verse, Minaj explained that she was "going to say some real ass shit that bitches need to hear, too, and that they want to say and be feeling like they can’t say." Minaj wrote her verse within an hour after Kardashian reached out to her. West failed to release Yandhi in September 2018. On October 1, 2018, West visited the TMZ office in Los Angeles to record a music video for "We Got Love" with American singer Teyana Taylor. In an interview with TMZ's Raquel Harper, West confirmed that he had an upcoming song about body shaming that featured Ty Dolla Sign and Minaj. On March 8, 2019, GOOD Music audio engineer Kevin Celik confirmed that the Yandhi track featuring Minaj and Ty Dolla Sign was titled "New Body". Celik stated that the "record for sure is Kim K-inspired", referring to Kardashian.

=== Jesus Is King rework and scrapped releases ===
During listening parties for Jesus Is King in September 2019, West previewed a reworked version of "New Body". In October 2019, Minaj stated that she was rerecording her verse to fit the religious theme of Jesus Is King, but that she and West were having disagreements. Minaj explained that West wanted to rework the track as a gospel song, adding "I done wrote three different verses chile, and I don’t know. We ain’t seeing eye to eye on it. I don’t know, but of course, I love and respect Kanye, and Kim, we’ll see what happens with that". "New Body" was previewed at a Jesus Is King listening party at The Forum in Los Angeles two days before the album's release date, but was removed from the final track listing for the album revealed the next day. The track was ultimately scrapped from the album due to the creative differences between Minaj and West.

In June 2020, Nicki Minaj stated that she would contact West about potentially releasing the song after it became viral on TikTok. Later that month, she urged fans to spam Kardashian for the song's release. Ty Dolla Sign referenced the track on his song "Status", from his October 23, 2020, album Featuring Ty Dolla Sign. One of his verses covers how he once tried to get West to release the song, to which West replied that the song was "generic shit" and that Ty Dolla Sign's voice was "too good" for it.

== Themes and lyrics ==
The original leaked version of "New Body" addressed the issues of slut-shaming and body shaming. Charles Holmes of Rolling Stone called the song West's "ode to the wonders of plastic surgery and the myths of body count". West explained the concept of "New Body" in an October 2018 interview, stating:

This concept is a 'Ye concept. I’m taking two stigmas at once because I love taking stigmas and flipping them to positive. Negative energy to a positive. One of the stigmas is that men, the more people we sleep with the higher our score goes. With a woman, the more people they sleep with, people they sleep with, people consider that to be, the lower their score goes.

Holmes described the reworked version of the song previewed in September 2019 as Christian-appropriate and that the "body is [now] simultaneously more metaphorical and metaphysical". Joe Coscarelli of The New York Times wrote that the song had been "altered for content, turning its more secular, sexual lyrics to something more chaste and respectful." Danilo Castro of Heavy.com noted that the reworked song had no curse words and "a more positive overall message."

== Promotion and leak ==
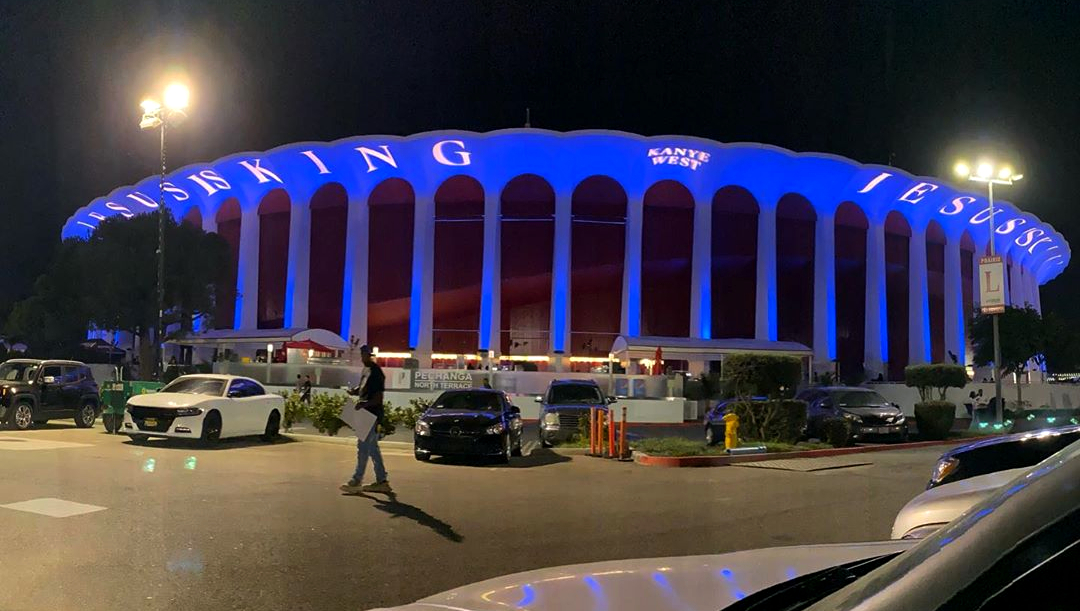
"New Body" was previewed at a Jesus Is King listening party in Los Angeles two days before the album's release.

West announced that he had a song with Minaj and Ty Dolla Sign about body shaming in an October 2018 interview with TMZ. The recording of Minaj's verse was prominently showcased in an April 2019 episode of American television series Keeping Up with the Kardashians. Following the airing of the episode, Kardashian discussed the writing of the song on Twitter. "New Body" was leaked online in July 2019 alongside another Yandhi track titled "The Storm", featuring Ty Dolla Sign and posthumous vocals from American rapper XXXTentacion. "The Storm" was scrapped and reworked for Jesus Is King as "Everything We Need". Paul Thompson, writing for The Fader, noted that the leaks did not receive mainstream attention and were a "minor story" compared to West songs that had leaked previously. A music video for "New Body" was recorded and although never officially released, leaked to the public on October 1, 2023

"New Body" was previewed by West at multiple listening parties for Jesus Is King throughout September and October 2019. "New Body" was notably absent from the listening party in Chicago, but was later re-added to the track list at further parties. "New Body" was last previewed at the listening party at The Forum in Los Angeles two days before the album's release date, but was removed from the final track listing for the album revealed the next day. The song was scrapped from the album and never released due to West and Minaj's creative differences.

=== Leaked music video ===
An unreleased music video for "New Body" was leaked in October 2023. The video was filmed with sets and costumes covered entirely in luminous paint, with actors and West, Minaj, and Ty Dolla Sign wearing glow-in-the-dark costumes. The video opens with a model with orange skin and neon green hair approaching and peeing in a urinal. West raps his verse in a cat mask as he rides a rollercoaster with five other characters, one holding a sign that says "TOO BIG TO FAILE [sic]" and an Uncle Sam-type figure. It then cuts to him rapping in a luminous cartoony alleyway while a model is perched on a windowsill. A UFO approaches, and he grabs the model and they flee. The video cuts to a scene featuring a female swimmer and a mermaid embracing and kissing underwater. Minaj raps her verse in an entirely orange costume while sitting on endless mountains of money. Another model is then eaten by a large pink mechanical T-Rex, and Minaj emerges from its mouth wearing a neon green cropped jacket. After a scene featuring a model dressed like a queen posing in front of a burning Hollywood Sign, the video cuts to Ty Dolla Sign, also in a cat mask and a prisoner jumpsuit, singing in a glowing jail cell while a stripper dances outside, who then unlocks the door for him. The video ends with Ty Dolla Sign taking off with her on a motorcycle with flaming rocket boosters.

== Critical reception ==
Paul Thompson, writing for The Fader, compared "New Body" to other Yandhi leaks as being "in various states of progress". Thompson praised the production and polishing on Ty Dolla Sign's hook and Minaj's verse, but described West's verse as still being in demo form as he "lapse[s] from finished lines into mumbles reference phrases". Thompson praised "New Body" and the other Yandhi leaks for having "more shape and direction that nearly anything on [Ye]" despite the unfinished lyrics. In writing for Rolling Stone, Thompson called it "the one song from the Yandhi leaks that sounded like it might be a hit."

Sam Murphy, writing for Cool Accidents, described the song as becoming "a superfan favourite" ever since it leaked. Brian McCollum of the Detroit Free Press described the Jesus Is King rework played during the September 2019 listening parties as "quickly infectious". Danilo Castro of Heavy described "New Body" as "one of the most hotly contested tracks on Jesus Is King."
