= Good (Don't Die) =

2024 song by Kanye West and Ty Dolla Sign

Song by ¥$

from the album Vultures 1
- Released: February 10, 2024
- Genre: Alternative R&B
- Length: 3:19
- Label: YZY
- Songwriters: Ye; Tyrone Griffin Jr.; Yonatan Goldstein; Sasha Hashemi; William Adams Jr.
- Producers: Ye; Ty Dolla Sign; Johnny Goldstein; will.i.am

"Good (Don't Die)" (stylized in all caps) is a song by the American hip-hop supergroup ¥$, composed of rapper Kanye West and singer Ty Dolla Sign, from their debut collaborative album, Vultures 1 (2024). The song includes additional vocals from J. Rey Soul. It was written by West and Ty Dolla Sign alongside Sasha Hashemi. The song was produced by West, Ty Dolla Sign, Johnny Goldstein, and will.i.am, who also have writing credits.

Upon release, a lawsuit was issued from Donna Summer's estate, accusing copyright infringement from the unauthorized interpolation of "I Feel Love". Due to the lawsuit, the song was removed from the album. Despite this, alongside the lack of a single release, the song made it onto four charts, hitting number 93 on the Billboard Hot 100 and reaching its highest position on the R&B/Hip-Hop Songs chart at number 43.

== Background and lawsuit ==
Filipino-American singer J. Rey Soul, a collaborator of the Black Eyed Peas, posted her excitement to Instagram when she realized "Good (Don't Die)" was released on Vultures 1. The singer thanked the group's member will.i.am and the rest of the team that worked on the track, receiving a comment from Ty Dolla Sign replying that she sounds like an angel. Following the release of Vultures 1, the estate of deceased singer Donna Summer posted to Instagram Stories stating that they had not authorized the interpolation of her 1977 single "I Feel Love" on "Good (Don't Die)". The estate accused West of copyright infringement, citing that he either "changed the words, had someone re sing [sic] it or used AI but it's [still 'I Feel Love']". As a result of the allegations, the track was removed from Spotify on February 14, 2024. The track had reached over eight million streams on the platform before the removal." It was initially still available on other streaming services, until going through removal at Amazon Music, Apple Music, and the iTunes Store on February 15, 2024.

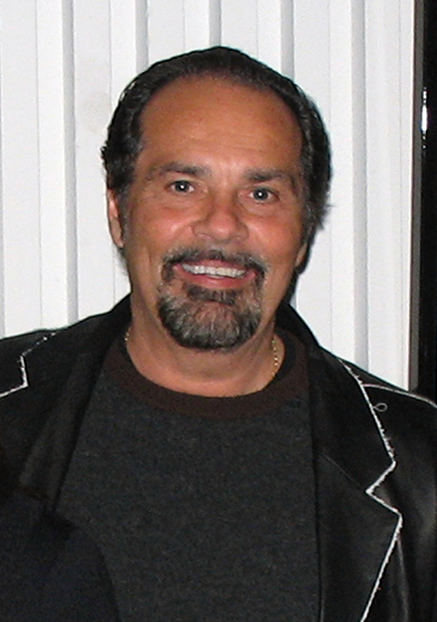
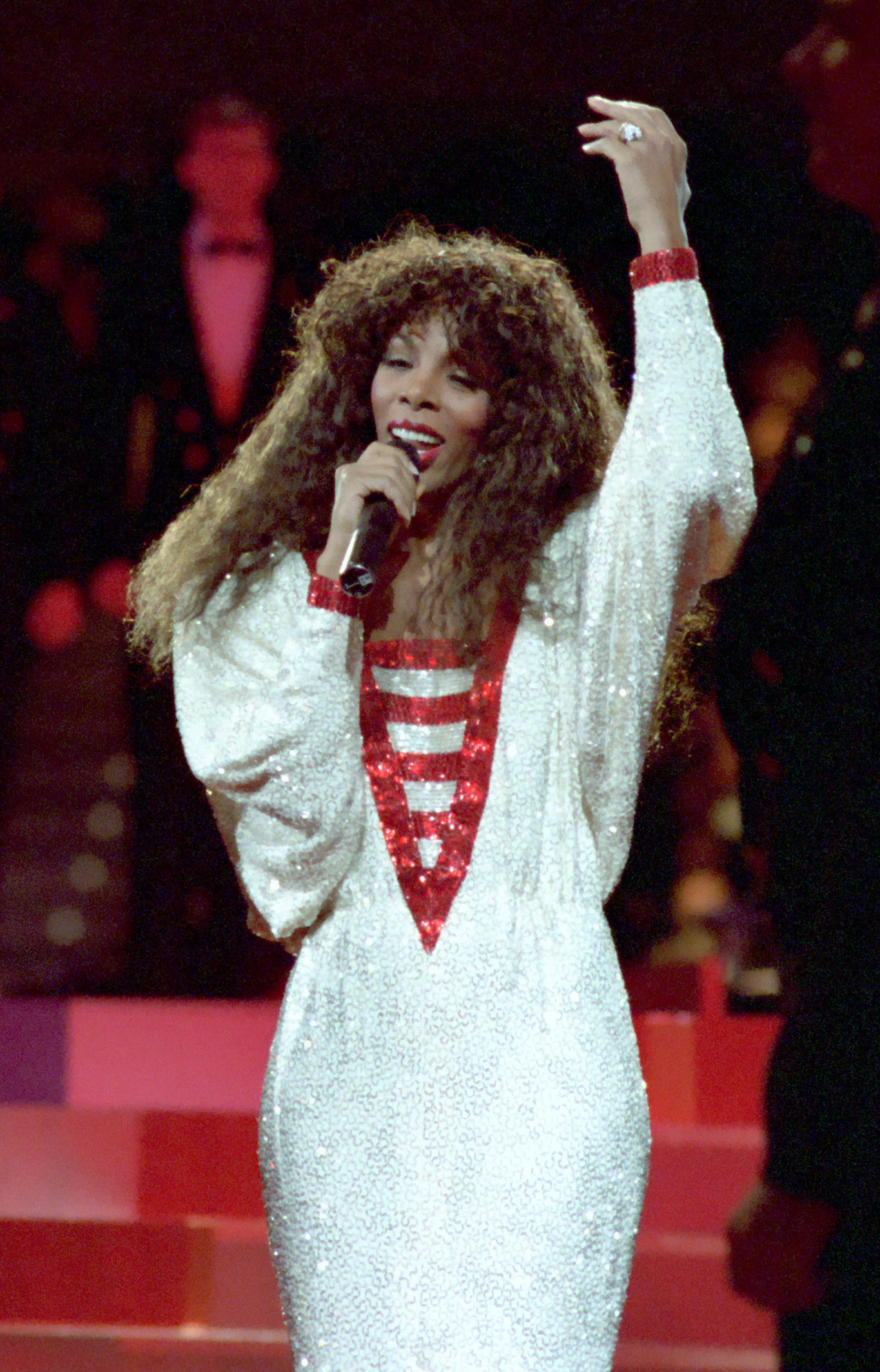
Bruce Sudano (left) sued West and Ty Dolla Sign for including a sample of "I Feel Love", a song from his widow, Donna Summer, (right) without permission. Due to the lawsuit, the song was removed from the album.

On February 27, 2024, Summer's widow Bruce Sudano filed a copyright infringement lawsuit against West and Ty Dolla Sign in a Los Angeles federal court for "blatant theft" of "I Feel Love" on behalf of her estate. The lawsuit cited that the group Alien Music had reached out to the estate requesting to sample "I Feel Love" in January on West's behalf, yet declined the request due to a risk to Summer's legacy and the song's "commercial value". They identified West as a "controversial public figure" that numerous brands and business partners had abandoned because of his conduct; he also failed with a request to Universal Music Enterprises. After denying him permission, the estate accused West of attempting to "get around this roadblock" by using a singer's unauthorized interpolation with the "iconic melody as the hook ... essentially re-recorded almost verbatim key", using a tactic for a sample being denied in spite of them controlling the song's rights. The lawsuit also said that the performers "shamelessly" utilized instantly recognizable parts, and accused them of "arrogantly and unilaterally" stealing the song. In the conclusion, the lawsuit read that it is about more than not paying the "appropriate licensing fee" and also focused on the right of artists to decide the usage of their work publicly, needing prevention of "simply stealing creative works" when legal rights are not secured. The injunction of a judge to stop any further circulation of "Good (Don't Die)" was sought, while "maximum" damages for Summer's estate were requested at $150,000.

On May 15, 2024, a lawyer for Summer's estate said in court that a "global settlement" had been reached with West and Ty Dolla Sign that signatures were gathered for. Estate lawyer Stanton L. Stein asserted that Plaintiff anticipated the agreement "can be executed shortly", which would be followed by the parties being able "to file a stipulation for dismissal of the action in its entirety". Stein addressed that in the unlikelihood of the parties failing to reach a conclusion by June 14, 2024, plaintiff would intend to "diligently prosecute the action against all defendants". He also declined to enter a dismissal. It was not known if "Good (Don't Die)" would be brought back to streaming services. On June 20, 2024, lawyers for both parties filed the final settlement agreement in court that they would each pay their own bills from the legal dispute. Following the statement's filing, Summer estate lead counsel Larry Stein told Billboard that the agreement did not give West permission to use her music in the future. He also said their desired result was reached through the performers agreeing "not to distribute or otherwise use the song", which remained unavailable at online music services.

== Reception ==
Despite being removed shortly after the release of the album, the song was met with widespread acclaim by music critics, a number of whom highlighted the production as well as West and Ty Dolla Sign's vocals. This track is often considered a highlight from the album. Michael Saponara of Billboard placed the track as the fourth best song of Vultures 1, stating "Oozing with 808s & Heartbreak vibes, Kanye transports OG fans to the desolate flows of 'Street Lights' when he tried to find his footing following the loss of his mother and introduce a foreign sound to a resistant hip-hop genre." Saponara additionally complimented the "brilliant" use of the Donna Summer interpolation, complementing Ty Dolla Sign for matching "Ye’s introspective nature". In a mixed review of Vultures 1, HipHopDX's Scott Glaysher said that "even the vintage groove of 'Good (Don’t Die)' warrants adding it to your playlist favorites."

== Commercial performance ==
Following the release of Vultures 1, "Good (Don't Die)" entered the US Billboard Hot 100 at number 93, despite having only been available to stream for four days. The song further reached number 43 on the US Billboard Hot R&B/Hip-Hop Songs chart. Elsewhere in North America, it debuted at number 76 on the Canadian Hot 100. In Portugal, the song charted at number 170 on the Portuguese Singles Chart. In Australia, the song charted at number 36 on their Hip-Hop/R&B chart. The song was most successful in Lithuania, reaching number 66 on the Lithuania Top 100. The song also charted at number 142 on the Global 200.

== Charts ==
Chart performance for "Good (Don't Die)"
Chart (2024)	Peak position
Australia Hip Hop/R&B (ARIA)	36
Canada Hot 100 (Billboard)	76
Global 200 (Billboard)	142
Lithuania (AGATA)	66
Portugal (AFP)	170
US Billboard Hot 100	93
US Hot R&B/Hip-Hop Songs (Billboard)	43
