= Vultures 1 =

2024 studio album by Kanye West and Ty Dolla Sign

- Album cover for Vultures 1. An earlier version featured West (left) wearing a white hockey mask.

Studio album by ¥$
- Released: February 10, 2024
- Recorded: 2022–2024
- Genres: Hip-hop; house; R&B; trap
- Length: 55:40 (52:21) (Note: The length is 52:21 on streaming versions due to "Good (Don't Die)" being absent.)
- Label: YZY
- Producers: Ye; Ty Dolla Sign; 88-Keys; Ambezza; Anthony Kilhoffer; Aver Ray; AyoAA; BbyKobe; Camper; Chad Hugo; Che Pope; Chrishan; Count Bassy; Dez Wright; DJ Mustard; Digital Nas; Dom Maker; DTP; Edsclusive; Feez; FnZ; Gustave Rudman; Hubi; Jae Deal; James Blake; Jasper Harris; Johnny Goldstein; JPEGMafia; Kaytranada; the Legendary Traxster; Leon Thomas III; Lester Nowhere; London on da Track; Lukasbl; Marlonwiththeglasses; Nic Nac; Ojivolta; Prodbyjuice; Shdøw; Stryv; Swizz Beatz; TheLabCook; Timbaland; Veyis; VinnyForGood; Vitals; Wax Motif; Wheezy; will.i.am

¥$ chronology
Vultures 1 (2024)	Vultures 2 (2024)

Kanye West chronology
Donda 2 (2022)	Vultures 1 (2024)	Vultures 2 (2024)

Ty Dolla Sign chronology
Cheers to the Best Memories (2021)	Vultures 1 (2024)	Vultures 2 (2024)

Original cover
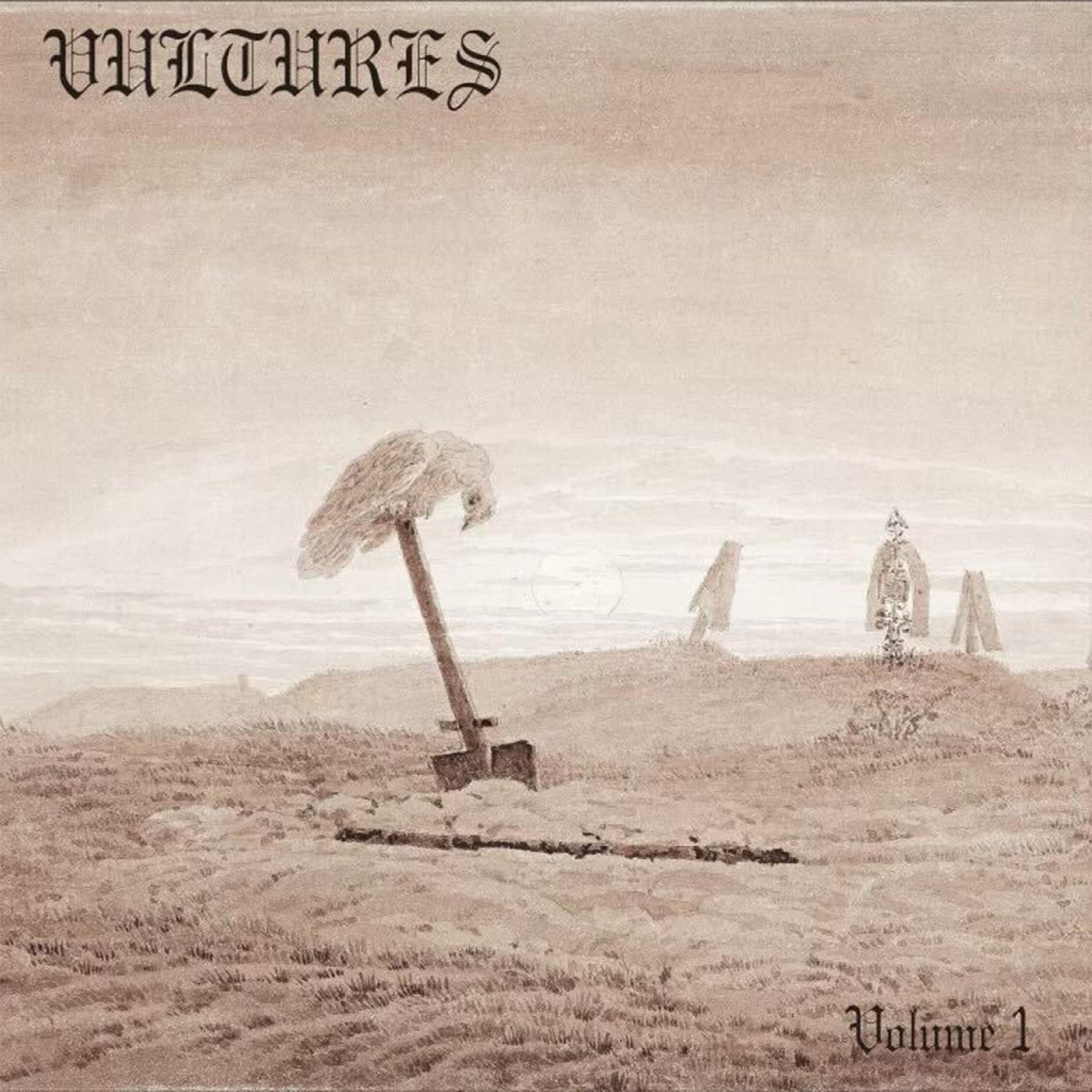
- Cover originally promoted and seen on the album's pre-release page on Apple Music; this is still used for the Vultures Pack compilation EP.

Singles from Vultures 1
- 1. "Vultures" Released: November 22, 2023; 2. "Talking / Once Again" Released: February 8, 2024; 3. "Carnival" Released: February 15, 2024

Vultures 1 (stylized in all caps) is the debut studio album by ¥$, an American hip-hop supergroup composed of the rapper Kanye West and the singer Ty Dolla Sign. It was released independently by West's YZY record label on February 10, 2024. Guest appearances include West's daughter North, India Love, Freddie Gibbs, YG, Nipsey Hussle, Quavo, Playboi Carti, Travis Scott, Bump J, Lil Durk, Rich the Kid, and Chris Brown. Production was primarily handled by West and Ty Dolla Sign themselves, alongside the Legendary Traxster, 88-Keys, Camper, JPEGMafia, Timbaland, Swizz Beatz, Ojivolta, Chrishan, Anthony Kilhoffer, and others.

West and Ty Dolla Sign began recording the album with collaborators in Italy in October 2023, then relocated to Saudi Arabia for three months. It sustained multiple delays and changes to the tracklist before release, following West's struggles to secure a distributor. The release was first teased throughout late 2023 under the title ¥$ and was set to be titled Vultures before being retitled to Vultures 1 as the first volume in a series. The tracks "Everybody" and "New Body" were announced for the album, but could not be included due to clearance issues. West and Ty Dolla Sign previewed tracks at the Vultures Rave listening party in December 2023, two months before holding numerous public events in Chicago, New York, and Milan. The album was initially distributed using the FUGA platform, allegedly in violation of FUGA's service agreement, and a withdrawal was made from streaming services on February 15, 2024. However, it was then re-distributed by Label Engine the same day.

In contrast to West's previous two albums, Jesus Is King (2019) and Donda (2021), Vultures 1 finds him forgoing religious themes and instead addressing his preceding controversies, as well as themes of money, relationships, sex, and fame. It also sees him returning to an explicit tracklist, with his previous two albums only featuring tracks with clean or censored lyrics. The cover art features West dressed in all-black with his hockey mask, joined by his partner Bianca Censori. The title track was released as the album's lead single in November 2023, followed three months later by "Talking / Once Again" and "Carnival", the latter of which topped the US Billboard Hot 100. Music videos were produced for all of the singles, with a new version of "Vultures" produced by Havoc used for the song's visual.

Vultures 1 was West's first major release following the controversies surrounding his antisemitic comments. It received mixed reviews from music critics, who criticized West's lyricism and manner of addressing his controversies, though the production and Ty Dolla Sign's contributions received praise. The album marked West's 11th number-one debut on the US Billboard 200, making him the rapper with the third-most number-one albums after Jay-Z (14) and Drake (13). It topped the charts in several other countries, including Australia, Canada, and Germany, becoming West's first number-one album in the latter country. Vultures 1 was certified gold and silver in the United States and the United Kingdom by the Recording Industry Association of America and British Phonographic Industry, respectively. All of the songs entered the Billboard Hot 100, bringing West to 157 career entries. A sequel album, Vultures 2, was released on August 3, 2024, with Vultures 3 also slated for a release indefinitely. The performers were scheduled to embark on a world tour in support of the album from 2024 to 2025, planned for cities such as New York and London, but no updates on this have been provided since.

== Background and recording ==
On August 25, 2023, NBC News reported from two sources that West had been working on music throughout the summer and planned to release an album, revealing "new music is imminent". West held a private listening event for the album in Italy on October 1, that Ty Dolla Sign attended and it was rumored they had been collaborating on the project. During that same month, the musicians were spotted in recording studios in Italy, alongside other artists. A joint concert at RCF Arena in Reggio Emilia, Italy was reportedly planned for October 20, 2023, but was delayed by a week and then canceled. The performers had collaborated in the past on multiple occasions, such as West's tracks "Only One" (2014) and "Real Friends" (2016). In an interview with Big Boy on March 15, 2024, Ty Dolla Sign expressed his loyalty to West, acknowledging both his successes and declines, and stated that he always knew West would regain popularity with each comeback and would celebrate his achievements when he did.

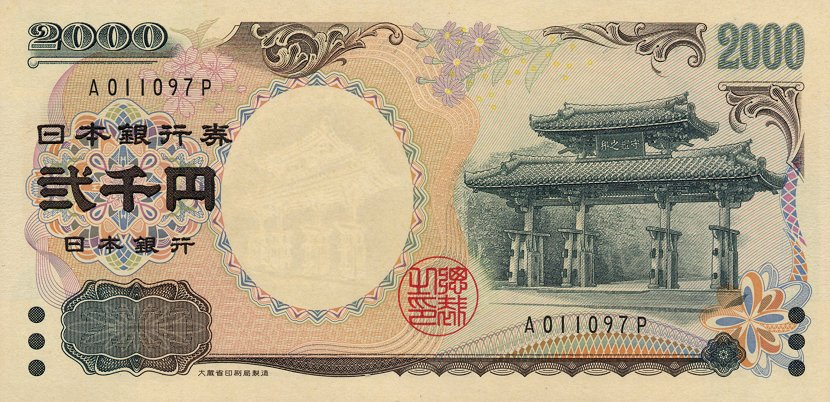
The symbol next to the dollar in West and Ty Dolla Sign's duo name of ¥$ represents the Japanese yen currency.

In an Instagram post on October 23, 2023, Ty Dolla Sign confirmed the album's existence. The post contained a black background with white text that displayed "¥$", their duo name; the symbol next to the dollar sign represents the Japanese yen. During a performance in early November 2023, Ty Dolla Sign said he had just flown in from Saudi Arabia, where he was working with West on their upcoming collaborative studio album and said it would be "coming real soon". Videos of the two artists recording with rapper Lil Baby also surfaced online. Images were released of West working on music at a desert studio in the Arabic oasis city al-Ula, appearing in a sparse setting surrounded by chairs and tents. According to the collaborator Darhyl Camper, the artists spent three months recording in Saudi Arabia, mostly in al-Ula. During writing sessions in Dubai, West was joined by the British singer ZLYAH, who was taken aback by the invitation and the fact that the rapper enjoyed his music, as he saw West as an inspiration. ZLYAH contributed to the writing of "Carnival" and he learned from this as his first writing credit for another artist; the singer said the process was to "write down ideas and pitch stuff" after being provided with beat packages for the instrumentals. He elaborated that West sent reference tracks to the songwriters and they improvised over beats, surmising they "had great chemistry" from the start and noting the rapper was involved with the songwriting too. British record producer Fred Again played snippets of a song by West and Ty Dolla Sign at a club, rumored to be from their collaborative project. West recalled the recording had a large budget due to visiting both Saudi Arabia and Italy, declaring that the expenses and "super mega talents" were part of why Vultures 1 is superior to other albums.

On December 13, 2023, media outlets reported that the interpolation of the boy band Backstreet Boys on "Everybody" was not authorized. The following day, West sent a text message to fellow rapper Nicki Minaj asking her for permission to include "New Body" on the album; during an Instagram Live stream, to which she denied his request, saying: "Why would I put out a song that's been out for three years?" In response to Nicki Minaj's statements, West said: "I made that girl rewrite her verse three times for 'Monster'. I supported her career. So, I don't know what it is." On December 29, 2023, "Everybody" was rumored to be released on streaming services. However, it was not released and DJ Pharris previewed another track, "Talking", on the Power 92 radio station instead. In late December, around the same time the album was delayed, West issued an apology in Hebrew to the Jewish community for his antisemitism controversy. On January 2, 2024, longtime West collaborator Malik Yusef posted a picture of Ty Dolla Sign in the studio, assuring that he was re-recording all of his verses as well as recording new ones. On February 12, after Vultures 1 had been released, West declared to TMZ that he was two months from bankruptcy before his relocation to Italy, where the rapper put his maximum effort into his work. West explained he "moved to the factories" and managed to survive cancellation, commenting that he was less concerned with being controversial rather than "the ability to say how you felt out loud" due to his perceived skillset he felt helped him survive.

== Music and themes ==
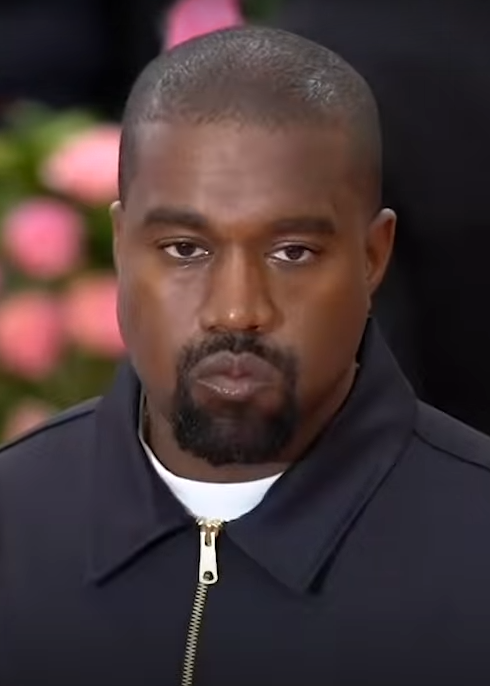
Breaking tradition with West's previous two albums Jesus Is King (2019) and Donda (2021), Vultures 1 moves to secular music and cursing. Numerous critics also noted the album as more cohesive than his preceding releases.

Vultures 1 is a hip-hop album that encompasses house, R&B, and trap, incorporating elements of gospel and industrial music. The album was described as more cohesive than West's recent records; none of the tracks are mumbled. Steven J. Horowitz of Variety summarized the musicality as a collection "of sharp aural moments that twists and shifts at each turn", observing that the different producers provide variety and scope. Pitchfork's Paul A. Thompson described the beats as "rhythmically complex", with a lack of any heavy influences. According to The Guardian journalist Alexis Petridis, Vultures 1 features a variety of styles, although he thought it is still uneven. In AllMusic, Fred Thomas noted West demonstrates the "same electric inventiveness" that made him famous as a producer, attributing this to aspects of the tracks like sparseness, funk, and orchestral music. The New York Times journalist Jon Caramanica opined that the album reminds him of "the texture-focused darkwave rap" style utilized by rappers Playboi Carti and Travis Scott, which originated with West's 2013 record Yeezus.

After West had promised that he would never make secular music again following his 2019 gospel record Jesus Is King and also did not curse at all on Donda in 2021, he broke with both of these traditions on the album. West had considered for it to include no curses initially, but Ty Dolla Sign persuaded him otherwise. Of his performances, Thompson believed he utilizes an "airy, endearing singing voice" and the rapping possesses technical precision. West and Ty Dolla Sign speak of women on Vultures 1, frequently making sexual references. The rapper provides reminders of his controversies, including the antisemitism that he alludes to his previous apology for. For the first few tracks, West demonstrates calmness as he tries to move past the controversies, before he moves the focus towards them.

== Songs ==
Vultures 1 opens with the slow-building gospel track "Stars", where West's vocal pitch rises and falls. Lyrically, he and Ty Dolla Sign embrace their accomplishments; the rapper dismisses being canceled and asserts that he "keep[s] a few Jews on the staff now" after his previous comments. "Keys to My Life" is a pop song that features an upbeat drum pattern, seeing West rap about the aftermath of his divorce from Kim Kardashian. He also addresses his relationship with Australian model Bianca Censori, mentioning how he aims to have another child. "Paid" incorporates elements of funk, electronic, and dubstep, relying on an upbeat drum pattern. The song is themed around capitalism and includes dance-pop style crooning from Ty Dolla Sign, while West delivers an interpolation of the Police's "Roxanne". According to Billboard's Michael Saponara, West "utilizes his baby voice" that evokes his 2022 appearance with conspiracy theorist Alex Jones on InfoWars. The next track, "Talking", continues the drum pattern and features West's daughter North West proclaiming on the chorus she is "your bestie", asserting that she should not be tested. Ty Dolla Sign delivers a verse about his daughter growing up and expresses hope she has been raised properly, and West closes the track by crooning about the clouds once again "gathering to release what they held in".

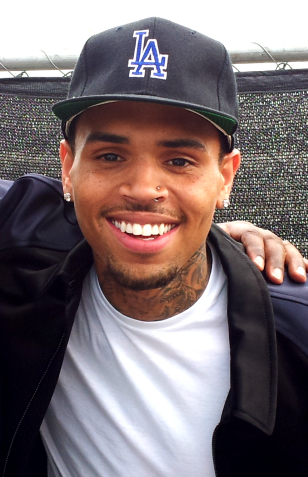
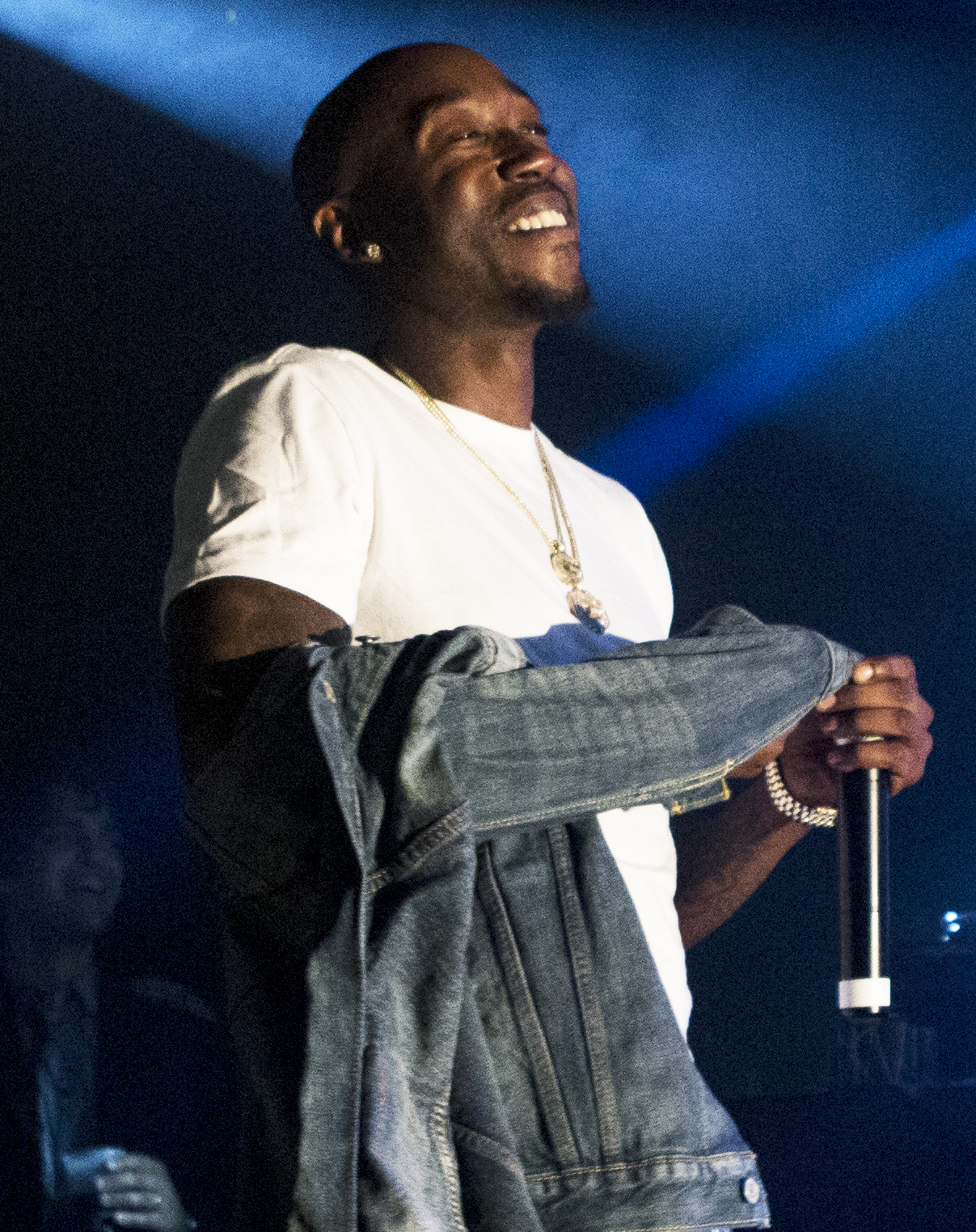
Chris Brown (left) and Freddie Gibbs (right) appear on Vultures 1; the former is also mentioned by West on the single "Carnival".

"Back to Me" is built around programmed rolling drums and a bassline, evoking the structure of West's 2010 single "Runaway". The line, "Beautiful, big-titty, butt-naked women just don't fall out the sky, you know?", is a soundbite from Jay and Silent Bob, repeated by West and Ty Dolla Sign throughout. Freddie Gibbs contributes a guest rap verse, where he compares himself to Elon Musk, using braggadocio. "Hoodrat" follows and contains a siren that repeats its title, accompanied by steel drums. West boasts about engaging in sexual activity with a woman, whom he dubs as a "whore". The conclusion utilizes an excerpt of Mike Tyson speaking of Ye, acknowledging his greatness and mental issues as most leaders have, such as his delusion of believing that "I Am a God". "Do It" features orchestral elements and relies on 808s, with themes of money and women. West starts his verse by telling those who do not like him that it is their loss, later boasting of sending a random woman $100,000 on Apple Pay. "Paperwork" prominently incorporates Brazilian funk, moving away from 808s to guitar synths. The song includes distortion, with lyrics about making money. "Burn" is a soulful number that was described as reminiscent of West's early material, which includes him making his financial problems out to be positive. West calls out critics as he alleges they have been "entertained by my pain", while implying that his issues provided liberation. West attacks Balenciaga, saying he heard R. Kelly was in one of their commercials. On the final chorus, he harmonizes with Ty Dolla Sign.

"Fuk Sumn" features bass and the theme of sexual fantasies, with West rapping "This the real, not a version". "Vultures" is a trap track that contains prominent synths, drums, and a beat switch. West references his previous antisemitism controversy by questioning "How I'm antisemitic? I just fucked a Jewish bitch", later followed by Ty Dolla Sign's line "She Russian, I beat up the pussy for Ukraine". Ty Dolla Sign sings with auto-tune, only making moderate usage of the technology. "Carnival" opens with a crowd chant of "ooohhh" that repeats throughout, accompanied by percussion that echoes chanting. In the lyrics, West references his rival Taylor Swift and calls out cancel culture as he dubs himself "Ye-Kelly", making comparisons also to Bill Cosby and Puff Daddy, while defending singer Chris Brown. "Beg Forgiveness" includes hollow drums and interpolations of Joseph Goddard's "Gabriel" (2013), featuring Brown shaming a subject that seeks his forgiveness. "Good (Don't Die)" is an electropop track with a vintage groove and goes against the style of hip-hop, alongside an interpolation of the deceased singer Donna Summer's "I Feel Love" (1977). This is coupled with harmonies from Ty Dolla Sign, who sings "don't die" with West. "Problematic" was described as evoking West's earlier works, utilizing loud horns. West recalls his younger days when he lived in New Jersey and traveled to New York City, seeking fame. For the hook of the album's closing track "King", West addresses his controversies by telling those who assigned the labels of "crazy, bipolar, antisemite" to him that he is "still the king".

== Release and promotion ==
On October 13, 2023, Billboard reported that West and Ty Dolla Sign were planning to release a collaborative album and were shopping it to five different record labels for distribution. The labels had been distancing themselves from West due to his widely publicized antisemitic comments in late 2022. The album had seemingly been delayed because Universal Music Group, the parent company of West's previous label Def Jam Recordings, stated that they were no longer working with him whatsoever. West alluded to the issues with Universal by alleging the label had been blocking his albums after the 2009 Taylor Swift VMAs incident, expressing that they tried to cancel him. Ty Dolla Sign posted a handwritten tracklist for the project to his Instagram account on December 8, 2023. Later that night, West previewed the opening track at the time, "Everybody", which included a sample from the Backstreet Boys' 1997 single "Everybody (Backstreet's Back)". Later on December 10, West played snippets of songs planned for the album at a restaurant in Wynwood, Florida, revealing guest contributions from Brown, and fellow rappers Future and Young Thug. At the preview, West revealed the title as Vultures and said it would be released on December 15. On December 12, 2023, Vultures was made available to pre-save on streaming services, although the pre-save link disappeared a few days later. Two days later, MDLBeast SoundStorm posted a late announcement on their Instagram account that West would be playing at their festival in the Saudi Arabian capital Riyadh and referenced the album. West did not perform at the festival, although he was photographed with fellow rapper Will Smith after he played there. On December 21, 2023, representatives for West confirmed to Billboard that the release of Vultures had been further delayed to January 12, 2024.

On January 11, 2024, one day before the expected release, Apple Music updated the release date of Vultures to January 19. Three days later, footage emerged of West and Ty Dolla Sign filming a music video for the song "Fuk Sumn", alongside Playboi Carti. On January 16, the iTunes page for Vultures updated to show that it was delayed to February 9, 2024. On January 23, West released the trailer for the album via Instagram, announcing it would be the first volume in the Vultures trilogy. Vultures 1 was set to be followed by Vultures 2 and Vultures 3 on March 8 and April 5, 2024, respectively. On January 30, North was seen wearing a Vultures shirt, which included an updated tracklist for the album on the back. Several of the tracks, such as "River", "Slide", "Gun To My Head", and "Unlock" were not included, possibly appearing on another installment of the trilogy. Vultures 1 had yet to release on its scheduled date in February 2024, leading Clash's Robin Murray to believe the album had again been delayed.

Vultures 1 was released to streaming services independently through West's YZY brand on February 10, 2024. Multiple publications noted that the release coincided with the 20th anniversary of West's debut studio album The College Dropout; The Ringer's Justin Charity opined this is "a sign of how distressingly far" he has come since his first single "Through the Wire" in 2003. The album did not initially appear on Spotify, which West alluded to with an Instagram post of a conversation between the two collaborators discussing whether this would impact the chart position or if the service was behind for releases. Later that same day, it was made available on Spotify and left Apple Music charts after briefly disappearing from the service without any explanation. Vultures 1 was quickly re-released on the platforms, although it was not made available on YouTube Music. Physical editions on CD and vinyl were issued, with pre-orders accepted on West's website after the album's release. Later during the year a wide release of CDs and cassettes were available for sale on Retail Stores too, along with a Brown Marbled Vinyl as standard edition and a Gold Splatter Vinyl, CDs and cassettes.

On February 11, 2024, West reposted a report to Instagram Stories that Vultures 1 had topped digital charts in 72 countries, a list notably including Israel when considering West's antisemitic controversy and his lyrical references. That same day, it resulted in West becoming the first-ever independent artist to be the most-streamed act on Spotify and also taking Swift's top position. On February 12, 2024, West made merchandise available for the album on his Yeezy.com website, priced at $20 per item as he had proposed. The merchandise features his Yeezy Pods, WET tank, and WET romper. It also includes the Vultures 1 box tee, Vultures logo box tee, a long-sleeve logo shirt, a long-sleeve shirt with the original cover art, and what were known as "vulture pants". Vultures 1 earned around $1,000,000 in its opening week, with $892,000 from streams and roughly $145,000 from sales. Responding to the commercial success in the United States, West issued a statement to Complex that it is "a beautiful time", while Ty Dolla Sign posted a video to Instagram Stories of him lifting his index finger to silence critics. West and Ty Dolla Sign headlined the Rolling Loud California 2024 festival on March 14 at the Hollywood Park Grounds in Inglewood, California, marking the first time that the festival has expanded from its usual three-day schedule. Ty Dolla Sign was originally set to perform a solo slot on March 16. West and the singer had dark-hooded attires at the festival, with the rapper wearing his hockey mask. Both of them walked around the stage as Vultures 1 played and a stage DJ later played West's earlier material; fans criticized the duo across Twitter for not performing themselves. In March 2024, West posted to his story that he had fired social media influencer YesJulz after she worked on the album's rollout, citing "unauthorized" posts she had made online. Vultures 2 and Vultures 3 missed their scheduled release dates of March 8, 2024, and April 5, 2024, respectively.

=== Singles and tour ===
On November 17, 2023, DJ Pharris previewed "Vultures", featuring uncredited guest vocals from rappers Bump J and Lil Durk, on his radio show WPWX Power 92 Chicago. The song did not initially appear on streaming platforms, until it was released as the lead single from Vultures 1 five days later. On February 7, 2024, an alternate version of "Vultures" with production from Havoc of Mobb Deep was released as a promotional single for the album, along with a music video on Instagram that includes footage from the trailer. Following the release of Vultures 1, the song reached number 34 on the US Billboard Hot 100. On February 7, 2024, "Talking / Once Again", which features uncredited guest vocals from North West, premiered via Instagram and YouTube. (Note: The song was released under the title of "Talking" on Vultures 1.) It was accompanied by a music video that features North getting braids in her hair to match with West's black threads and Ty Dolla Sign gazing at his own daughter, who rests her head on his shoulder in the ending scene. The song was later released as the second single from the album on February 8, 2024. It entered the Billboard Hot 100 at number 30. "Carnival", a collaboration with Playboi Carti and fellow rapper Rich the Kid, was released to Apple and YouTube Music as the third single on February 15, 2024; the release was delayed when Vultures 1 faced temporary removal issues. The song debuted at number three on the Hot 100, then topped the chart in its fourth week. This marked West's fifth chart-topper and Ty Dolla Sign's second, while it stood as the first for Rich the Kid and Playboi Carti. On November 29, 2024, "Carnival" was certified double platinum by the Recording Industry Association of America (RIAA) for amassing 2,000,000 certified units in the US. In the United Kingdom, the song debuted at number 12 on the UK Singles Chart. It also received a silver certification from the British Phonographic Industry (BPI) for pushing 200,000 units in the country on April 12, 2024. An accompanying music video was released on March 11, 2024, which shows a riot setting.

On February 6, 2024, West posted a video to Instagram Stories of himself lamenting not being able to secure any venues for a Vultures world tour, alleging this was because of his controversy from late 2022. West highlighted that he had "not been allowed to perform in a year" and compared this to the 2022 film Elvis; he quickly received text messages with offers for venues from many of his collaborators. He subsequently posted screenshots of these texts detailing possible cities for the tour, including New York, Toronto, London, Dubai, Lagos, Melbourne, and Tokyo. The tour dates would start in the Summer of 2024 and run into early 2025, with plans to also visit "iconic international venue options" such as the Brazilian mountain Corcovado, the Great Wall of China, and Egypt's Giza pyramid complex. On March 11, 2024, Billboard reported that West was organizing the Vultures World Tour and his former longtime associate John Monopoly will serve as the manager, marking their first involvement in over 10 years.

== Controversy ==
=== Featured, sampled and interpolated artists' objections ===
On February 9, 2024, Ozzy Osbourne posted on Instagram that West was refused permission to sample a 1983 Black Sabbath live performance of the song "Iron Man", but that he had done so anyway on "Carnival". While a leaked version of the track used the sample, the version played at the Chicago listening event did not. West later removed the sample from the song, and was instead replaced by his own track "Hell of a Life", which itself samples "Iron Man". The same day, DJ Roca, one of the artists responsible for "Montagem Faz Macete 3.0", sampled in "Paperwork", shared his appreciation for the usage of his song on Instagram. Juvenile appreciated West sampling "Back That Azz Up" on "Do It", having received support from the rapper in the past.

Following the release of Vultures 1, Summer's estate posted to Instagram Stories stating that they had not authorized the use of "I Feel Love" for "Good (Don't Die)". They alleged that "he changed the words, had someone re sing [sic] it or used AI" but that it still constituted "copyright infringement". The song was removed from Spotify on February 14, 2024, a day before it was retracted from Amazon Music, Apple Music, and the iTunes Store. On February 27, 2024, the estate filed a lawsuit against West and Ty Dolla Sign for "blatant theft" of "I Feel Love". The estate said that the use of the song was "explicitly denied", and that they "wanted no association with West's controversial history". On May 15, 2024, a lawyer for the estate said that both parties had reached a "global settlement", followed by them being able "to a file a stipulation" to dismiss the action entirely. On June 20, attorneys for both parties filed a final settlement in court that they would each pay their own bills from the legal dispute. Following the settlement, the lead counsel of Summer's estate told Billboard that the agreement reached their desired result through West and Ty Dolla Sign agreeing not to use the song.

=== FUGA distribution dispute and withdrawal ===
On February 15, 2024, the distribution platform company FUGA released a statement that they were working with streaming service providers to remove Vultures 1 from streaming services after the label delivered its release. The statement revealed that FUGA had been offered the release in late 2023 and had declined to publish the album, but the final release had nevertheless been delivered through the company's automated processes by a "long-standing FUGA client" in violation of their service agreement. FUGA also confirmed the client, Warner Chappell Music, was collaborating with them on the removal. The album was temporarily removed from the iTunes Store and Apple Music, before being added back that same day by a different distributor, Label Engine. On March 2, 2024, Ty Dolla Sign posted himself scrolling through the front page of Apple Music to West's Instagram Stories that did not show Vultures 1, which HipHopDX anticipated may be due to the withdrawal issues. The singer added that he and West never appeared in the "New Music" nor "Best New Songs" sections on Apple Music, although he noted that "Carnival" reached number one on the Apple Music songs chart.

== Listening events ==
On October 23, 2023, Ty Dolla Sign announced a "multi stadium listening event" to be held on November 3 in promotion of Vultures 1, similar to listening parties West hosted during the release of Donda in 2021. The events were canceled, with the plans to release the album that night being scrapped.

On December 10, 2023, Ty Dolla Sign announced a listening event entitled Vultures Rave to be held at the shopping center Sawgrass Mills in Sunrise, Florida, on December 12. At the event, the performers played 10 tracks from Vultures 1, along with guests Brown, Offset, Kodak Black, Lil Durk, Bump J, Freddie Gibbs, and North. Technical difficulties prevented them from previewing more songs from the album. West faced criticism for wearing a black hooded outfit at the Vultures Rave, with several commentators noting its similarity to traditional Ku Klux Klan uniforms. Carlos de Loera of the Los Angeles Times opined that West's outfit served to amplify his antisemitic remarks and other inflammatory beliefs. On December 15, 2023, a second listening party took place in Las Vegas, with tickets on sale for $2,000. The event was "disbanded" by the Las Vegas Police, citing no licensing from the promoter's end and holding it without a remit. A statement was sent to XXL that an additional listening event would be held in Saudi Arabia and Vultures 1 was set for release on December 31.

On February 5, 2024, West and Ty Dolla Sign announced the album's first public listening event at Chicago's United Center via separate posts for February 8. The venue's website said that the event "marks a historic moment" of attendees listening to Vultures 1 with the contributing artists before its release, suggesting offering this would be iconic by bringing them together to celebrate "creativity and innovation". Tickets for the event sold out on the day of the announcement and the live stream was held through the streaming platform Veeps, which charged $19.99 per viewer. The show started one hour later than scheduled, as the result of production issues. West and Ty Dolla Sign wore outfits matching the music video for "Vultures"; the rapper's outfit consisted of a black leather bomber jacket, leather pants, and his white hockey mask, while the singer wore a loose, long black trench coat with a balaclava and a black half-ski mask. Guests who performed with the collaborators included North, YG, Bump J, and Freddie Gibbs. The crowd reacted enthusiastically to North's appearance, while Chance the Rapper was in attendance at the event. The stage was covered in smoke, surrounded by white flags with the Vultures logo. The live stream was cut off abruptly after West rapped a line with "antisemite", although it soon resumed. At the live stream's end, it cut to black and featured a chat box containing messages like "Yefund".

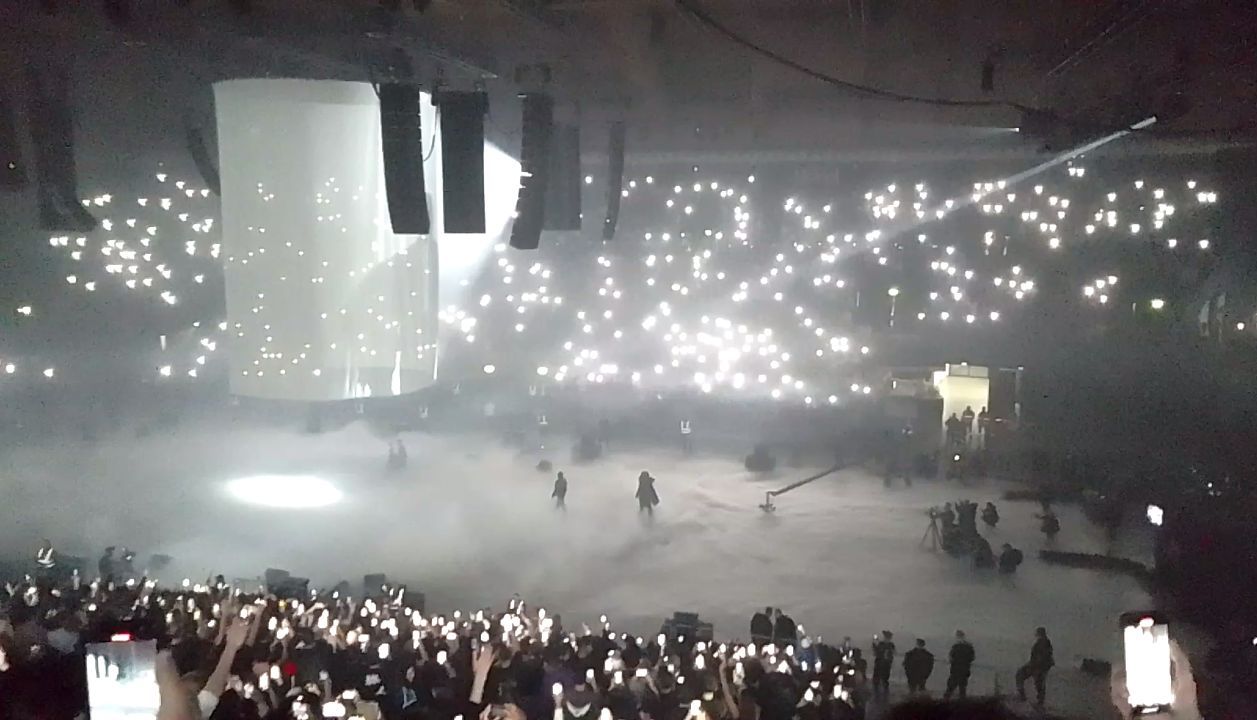
Vultures 1 listening party in Bologna, Italy, showing the LED wall over a smoke-covered stage

On February 7, 2024, West posted to Instagram that a second listening event would be held at UBS Arena in New York's Belmont Park, coinciding with the release date of the album on February 10. The event offered "a high-fidelity audio and visual showcase". Tickets were sold online at $225 for the show, which began two hours late. Smog clouded the arena, which West and Ty Dolla Sign walked around for 45 minutes wearing their face coverings. Playboi Carti, Roddy Ricch, and Rich the Kid made appearances. On February 11, 2024, West and Ty Dolla Sign held a pop-up listening show from a tent at a temporary Wynn West venue in the Las Vegas Strip of Paradise, Nevada, where the rapper wore a black leather coat and a mask of the same color. Six days later, the performers announced "a hi-fidelity audio experience" of listening parties for Vultures 1 in Italy. The events took place in Milan and Bologna on February 22 and 24, respectively. A floating cylindrical LED wall stood above the smoke-covered stage of the Mediolanum Forum in Milan, where West and Ty Dolla Sign danced with face coverings. The event included the unreleased album track "Everybody". Two days after his previous announcement, West posted that a "listening experience" would be held at Paris's Accor Arena on February 25, 2024. West and Ty Dolla Sign wore masks and danced throughout; the rapper removed his mask for "King" at the end. The event included West performing "Talking" with North, who wore a completely black outfit matching with him and a winter fur hat. According to Billboard, the first five public listening events grossed $12 million in ticket sales. On March 10, 2024, a listening event was held at the Footprint Center in Phoenix, during which North announced her album Elementary School Drop Out, named after The College Dropout by her father. Two days later, another event took place at Chase Center in San Francisco, where Kardashian and Censori were spotted together in attendance. On March 30, 2024, West announced listening experiences of Vultures 1 and the sequel for April at locations such as Nashville, Pittsburgh, and Washington, D.C.

== Cover art ==
=== Original Landscape with Graves cover art ===
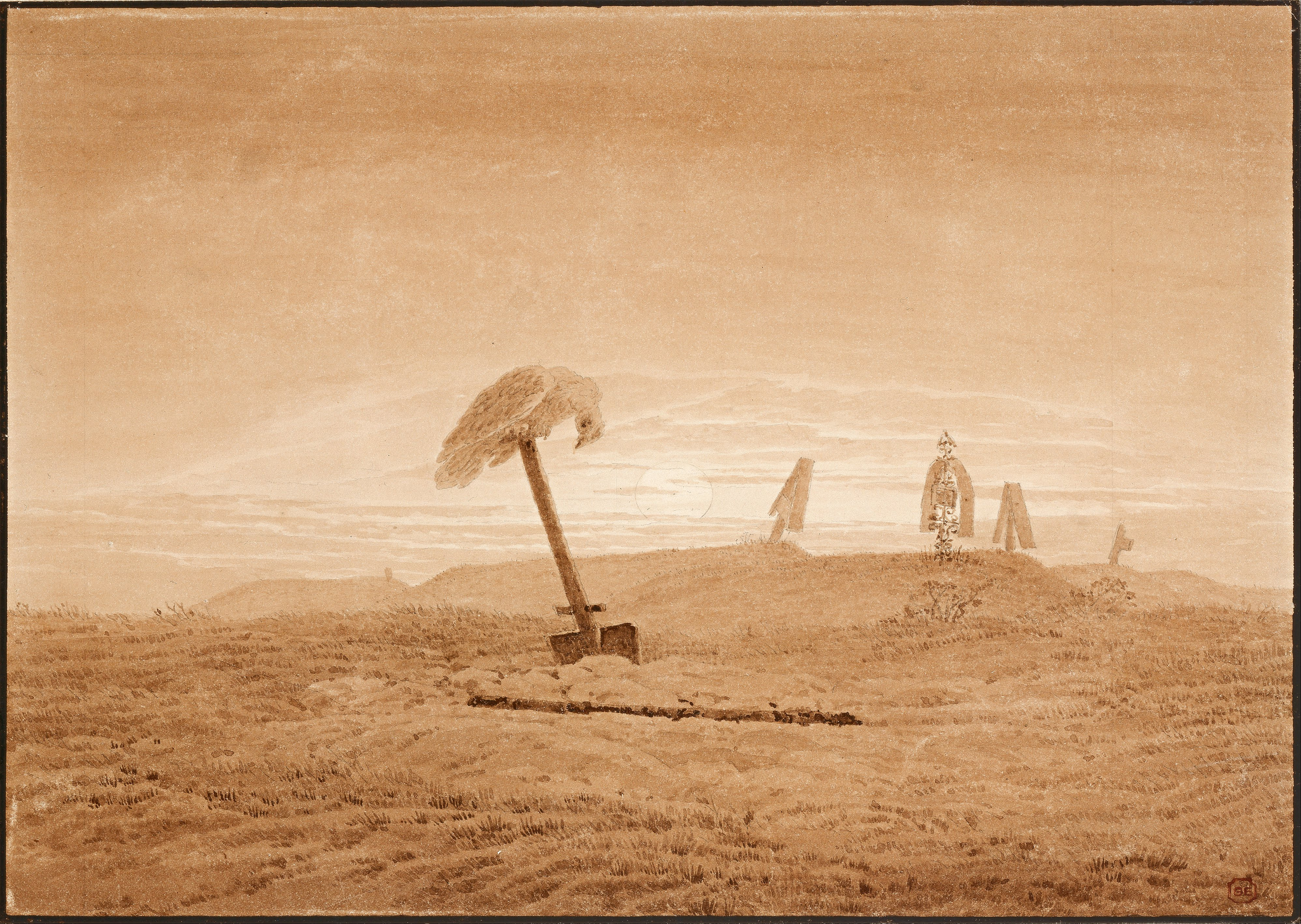
The original cover art for Vultures 1 incorporated Caspar David Friedrich's Landscape with Graves.

The originally announced cover art for Vultures 1 used German artist Caspar David Friedrich's 1835 painting Landscape with Graves, which shows a bleak island horizon photo along with a bird atop a shovel in a graveyard. A large black border was added around the picture, with "Vultures" at the top in all-caps. This cover was revealed on December 11, 2023, when Playboi Carti posted an iMessage exchange between him and West where he was sent that version. On December 12, 2023, Ty Dolla Sign revealed an alternate monochrome cover via Instagram, featuring the subtitle "Volume 1" in the bottom right corner.

Writing for HipHopDX, Sam Moore described the Friedrich cover art as being "linked to Nazism", noting Friedrich was one of Hitler's favorite artists. Moore further found that the cover's typography was reminiscent of that used for albums by Burzum, a black metal project founded by neo-Nazi Varg Vikernes; Burzum's music was previously sampled on Gucci Mane's "Pussy Print" in 2016, which features West. The Burzum comparison and Hitler's adoration of Friedrich were also reported on by The Guardian and The Independent. West was later photographed wearing a Burzum shirt in a tweet with collaborator JPEGMafia, which Vikernes responded to by praising West for having the courage to wear his project's shirt in public. Following the release of Vultures 1, merchandise was available online for sale that features the Friedrich cover art.

=== Current cover art ===
When the album was released on February 10, 2024, it had a new cover, which was photographed by director Aus Taylor. The cover depicts West wearing an all-black outfit with his hockey mask, originally a white mask but then changed to all-black, standing next to Censori. She has her back to the camera and is mostly nude above her thighs, only obscuring part of her buttocks with a rectangular piece of sheer black cloth, and wearing black stockings and high heels. The white hockey mask, which was also featured at the listening parties, was widely considered a reference to Jason Voorhees from the Friday the 13th film franchise. Kane Hodder, the actor for Jason, reacted to the mask by saying it is "kind of a cheesy one" and offered West one of his masks used for the character. Ty Dolla Sign said he had no involvement in making the cover. Exclaim! ranked the album cover 11th worst of 2024.

== Critical reception ==
Professional ratings
Aggregate scores
Source	Rating
Metacritic	52/100
Review scores
Source	Rating
AllMusic	2.5/5 stars
Evening Standard	1/5 stars
Financial Times	2/5 stars
The Guardian	2/5 stars
HipHopDX	3/5
NME	2/5 stars
Pitchfork	5.8/10
Sputnikmusic	2.5/5
Still Listening	26/100
The Times	1/5 stars

Vultures 1 received mixed reviews from critics. According to the review aggregator Metacritic, Vultures 1 received "mixed or average reviews" based on a weighted average score of 52 out of 100 from nine critic scores.

Wren Graves of Consequence found the album to be unoriginal, and dismissed the lyrics as mostly "broad griping and trollery", calling it "repetitive, redundant, and far too impressed with itself" for anyone apart from dedicated fans. In a review for The Times, Will Hodgkinson called Vultures 1 "a charmless disaster". He panned the lyrics, describing them as "the most tired hip-hop clichés", and found West's production to be unoriginal. He also criticized the way that West addresses controversies prior to release, especially his antisemitic remarks. Nonetheless, Hodgkinson found that Vultures has parts that are not bad such as highlights "Stars", "Keys to My Life", "Talking", and "Good (Don't Die)". Petridis of The Guardian opined that the album was an improvement on Donda, but said West's verses are "profoundly depressing" and criticized his inclination to controversy on the basis of him thinking "he can get away with it".

Rhian Daly of NME wrote that West brings elements of greatness "but also makes it hard to enjoy those moments for too long", and characterized the album's mixing as poor and its lyrics as misogynistic, while praising "Burn" and highlighting "Talking" as the standouts. Complex head of music Eric Skelton wrote that 20 years into his recording career, West remains "an excellent producer and curator". He considered Ty Dolla Sign the right collaborator for the project and praised the combination of his vocals with West's production. Skelton cited "Burn" as a highlight, feeling that it seems like "a long-lost track from [The College Dropout or Late Registration]". Nonetheless, his opinion about the lyrics was more mixed, saying West is "still a defiant troll who can't help but reach for cringey jokes and clunky one-liners" that downgrade the strength of his performances; he summarized that "the controversies are addressed in a very Kanye way". Rolling Stone reviewer Jayson Buford characterized Vultures 1 as "a serviceable record" and said the production still shows West's ability despite being sparse, though felt he makes Ty Dolla Sign "sound as bubbly as he's been" since the presidency of Barack Obama. Buford also observed that West may not be moving culture forward anymore, yet the gospel usage remains prominent at do its interactions with the album's secular elements by the heavy presence of this culture, with the rapper wishing to live "in a more conservative world".

Saponara, who ranked the album's songs for Billboard, commented on its release, saying many would consider Vultures 1 West's comeback album as his first independent project, despite most of his projects being "fueled by some form of plight he's fighting against". Saponara praised certain aspects of the production and Ty Dolla Sign's contributions, while he named "Carnival" his favorite song on the album, calling it a prime example of why West's fans tolerate all of his controversies, delays and "madness that come [...] because nobody in rap creates generational moments like this". Caramanica of The New York Times remarked that West merely addresses his controversies "in glances, no-stakes responses to a high-stakes game" and found the lyrics to be "full of puerile punchlines that might feel freeingly childlike" at a lower intensity. He concluded that the album is more sensible with its production, calling this "scabrous and tense, moodily emotive and urgent", deeper than the words. Chris Richards of The Washington Post considered that Vultures 1 is West's "most cogent effort in years, which actually means very little considering his past three outings – Ye, Jesus Is King and Donda – seemed to fall apart" upon listening, criticizing the unoriginality and lyrical content. In a positive review at HipHopDX, Scott Glaysher said the album seemingly manages to succeed "at disguising West's past year of turmoil" in tracks that are reminiscent of Donda, while he noted that West and Ty Dolla Sign become "a little mundane" through repetition later on. Glaysher concluded that the album "doesn't move the needle" for the performers, although he felt it still provides hope for the "old Kanye".

== Commercial performance ==
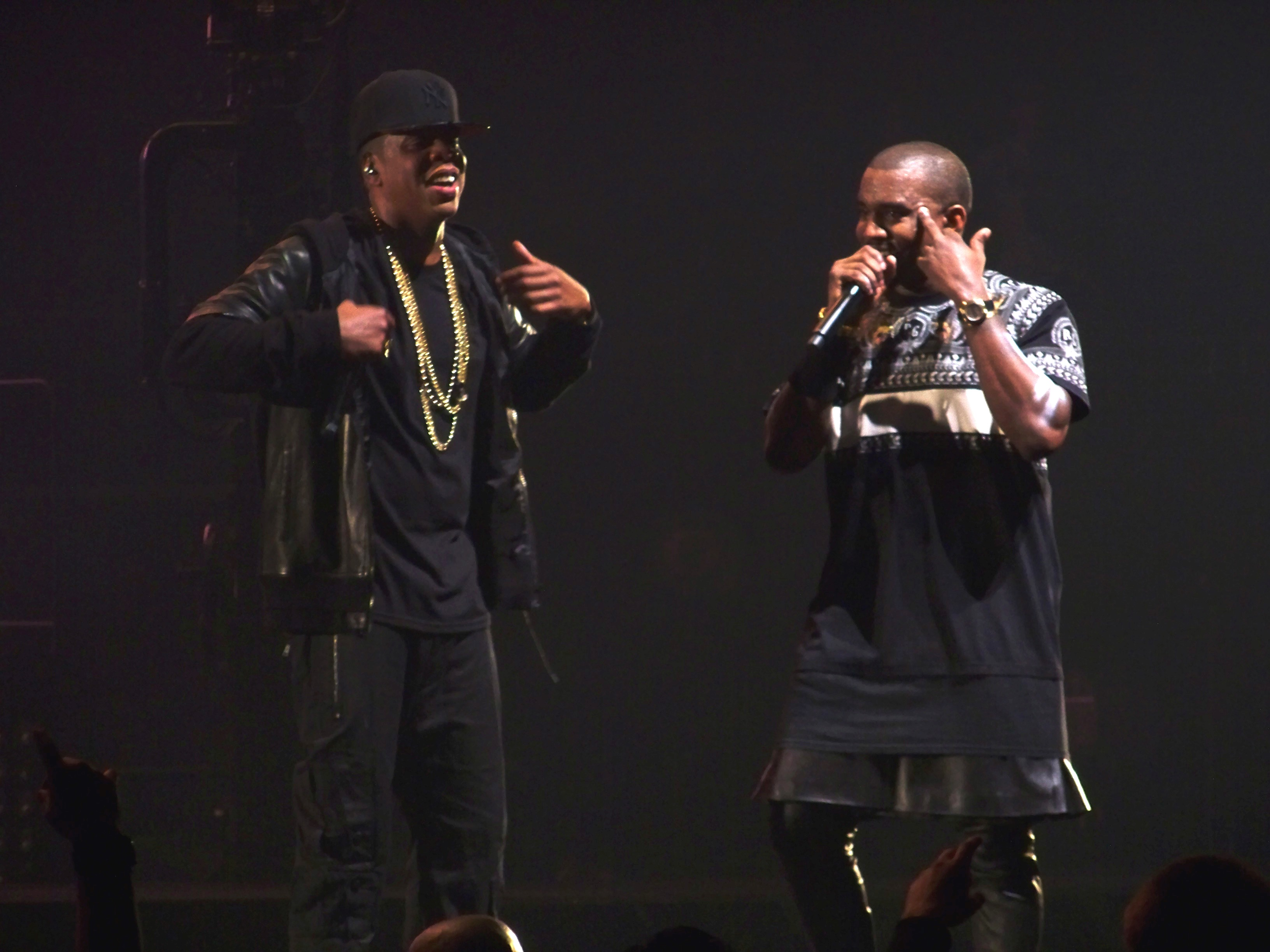
The album was West's third record to spend two weeks atop the US Billboard 200 and his first since Watch the Throne, his 2011 collaborative album with Jay-Z.

Vultures 1 debuted at number one on the US Billboard 200 after a five-day tracking period, scoring West's second-lowest first week sales with 148,000 album-equivalent units. The units consisted of 129,000 streaming-equivalent units, 18,000 pure album sales, and 1,000 track-equivalent units. West tied with Bruce Springsteen and Barbra Streisand for the fourth most chart-toppers overall and became the rapper with the third most, breaking his tie with Eminem. Vultures 1 was Ty Dolla Sign's first chart-topper and his second top-10 record, following Featuring Ty Dolla Sign in 2020. It further reached number one on the US Independent Albums and Top R&B/Hip-Hop Albums charts. In its second week on the Billboard 200, Vultures 1 remained at the top position, with units declining 50% to 75,000. This became West's third album to spend two weeks at number one and his first since Watch the Throne with Jay-Z in 2011. On November 29, 2024, Vultures 1 received a gold certification from the RIAA for pushing 500,000 certified units in the US. At the end of 2024, it ranked as the 68th biggest album on the Billboard 200. Elsewhere in North America, the album debuted atop the Canadian Albums Chart.

In Europe, Vultures 1 entered the German Top 100 Albums chart at number four and rose to the top position in its second week, marking West's first number-one album in Germany. The album also topped the charts in Austria, Belgium's Flanders region, the Czech Republic, Denmark, Finland, Iceland, Lithuania, the Netherlands, Norway, Poland, Portugal, Slovakia, and Switzerland. On April 17, 2024, it was certified gold by IFPI Danmark for shipments of 10,000 units in Denmark. Vultures 1 entered the UK Albums Chart at number two, prevented from topping the chart by Noah Kahan's Stick Season (2022). It became Ty Dolla Sign's first top-40 album in the UK and the most-streamed record of the week, while 3,192 sales were accumulated in the first three days. On April 10, 2026, Vultures 1 was awarded a gold certification from the BPI for pushing 100,000 units in the country. In Ireland, the album reached the same position on the Albums Chart, also being blocked from debuting atop the chart by Stick Season. It peaked at number two in Sweden and further attained top five positions in Hungary, Spain, and Italy. Vultures 1 topped the ARIA Albums chart, becoming West's fifth number-one album in Australia. It also marked Ty Dolla Sign's first chart topper in the country, surpassing his previous peak of number 37 with Beach House 3 in 2017. Elsewhere in Oceania, the album topped the New Zealand Albums chart and was certified gold by the Recorded Music NZ for selling 75,000 units on May 1, 2024.

All 16 album tracks entered the Billboard Hot 100. "Carnival" charted the highest, topping the Hot 100, on which West reached 157 career entries. "Back to Me", "Burn", and "Carnival" entered the top 20 of the UK Singles Chart and the latter reached the highest position at number 12. The same three tracks debuted within the top 30 of the Irish Singles Chart, of which "Carnival" peaked at number 15.

== Track listing ==
Track listing and credits are adapted from Spotify, with additional credits taken from the BMI Repertoire. (Note: Credits on the BMI Repertoire can be viewed by searching a song's work number. The following songs have additional credits adapted from the BMI Repertoire: "Paid" (BMI #66252218); "Burn" (BMI #66820929))

Vultures 1 track listing
No.	Title	Writer(s)	Producer(s)	Length
1.	"Stars"	Ye; Tyrone Griffin Jr.; Quentin Miller; Lucien Parker; Darhyl Camper Jr.; Barrington Hendricks; Timothy Mosley; Konrad Żyrek; Michael Mulé; Isaac De Boni; Samuel Lindley; Billy Ray Schlag	Ye; Ty Dolla Sign; Camper; JPEGMafia; FnZ; the Legendary Traxster; Aver Ray; Timbaland; Shdøw	1:55
2.	"Keys to My Life"	Ye; Griffin; Cydel Young; Warren Trotter; Mosley; S. Lindley; Żyrek; Hubert Polinski; Vincent Vendi; Veyis-Can Urun	Ye; Ty Dolla Sign; Timbaland; the Legendary Traxster; Shdøw; Hubi; VinnyForGood; Veyis	2:54
3.	"Paid"	Ye; Griffin; Cedric Hailey; Joel Hailey; Louis Celestin; Anthony Clemons Jr.; Anthony Kilhoffer; Christopher Dotson; S. Lindley; Hamid Bashir; Denzel Curry	Ye; Ty Dolla Sign; Kaytranada; Kilhoffer; Chrishan; the Legendary Traxster; Stryv	3:15
4.	"Talking"	Ye; Griffin; North West; James Litherland; Clemons; Miller; Young; Shawntoni Nichols; Dominic Maker; Kasseem Dean; Camper; Edward Davadi	Ye; Ty Dolla Sign; James Blake; Maker; Swizz Beatz; Camper; Edsclusive	3:05
5.	"Back to Me"	Ye; Griffin; Frederick Tipton; Quavious Marshall; Nicholas Balding; Zachary Frenes; Sasha Hashemi; James Hau; Charles Njapa; Daniel Kin Chien; Aswad Asif; Michael Dean	Ye; Ty Dolla Sign; 88-Keys; Wax Motif; AyoAA; Feez; Nic Nac; Count Bassy	4:55
6.	"Hoodrat"	Ye; Griffin; Malik Jones; Robert Booker; Njapa; Camper	Ye; Ty Dolla Sign; 88-Keys; Camper	3:42
7.	"Do It"	Ye; Griffin; Keenon Jackson; Ermias Asghedom; Supreme Williams; Alexander West; Dijon McFarlane; Kevin Gomringer; Tim Gomringer; Camper; Dotson; S. Lindley; Schlag; Jones; Denis Raab; Lukas Leth	Ye; Ty Dolla Sign; DJ Mustard; Cubeatz; Camper; the Legendary Traxster; Aver Ray; DTP; LukasBL; Chrishan	3:45
8.	"Paperwork"	Ye; Griffin; Marshall; Njapa; K. Dean; Nasir Pemberton; S. Lindley; Jones; Clemons; Bruno Da Costa; Victor Maciel; Leonardo Yasmil; Aderli Ramirez	Ye; 88-Keys; Swizz Beatz; Digital Nas; the Legendary Traxster	2:25
9.	"Burn"	Ye; Griffin; Tyshane Thompson; Morten Ristorp; Dotson; Azul Wynter; Joseph Goddard; Valentina Pappalardo; John Beck; Donald Breedlove; Napoleon Crayton; Leon Thomas III; S. Lindley	Ye; Ty Dolla Sign; Thomas; the Legendary Traxster	1:51
10.	"Fuk Sumn"	Ye; Griffin; Jordan Carter; Jacques Webster II; Marshall; Miller; Dotson; Hendricks; Aswas Asif; Che Pope; Pemberton; Żyrek; Polinski; Mosley; S. Lindley; Kobe Hood	Ye; Ty Dolla Sign; JPEGMafia; Timbaland; the Legendary Traxster; AyoAA; BbyKobe; Pope; Digital Nas; Shdøw; Hubi	3:29
11.	"Vultures"	Ye; Griffin; Terrance Boykin; Durk Banks; Pharris Thomas; Young; Trotter; Mark Williams; Raul Cubina; Mathias Liyew; Gustave Rudman Rambali; Marlon Barrow; Jason Harris; Paul Beauregard; Jordan Houston	Ye; Ty Dolla Sign; Prodbyjuice; Ojivolta; Ambezza; Gustave Rudman; Marlonwiththeglasses; Wheezy; Jasper Harris; Jae Deal	4:36
12.	"Carnival" (with Rich the Kid featuring Playboi Carti)	Ye; Griffin; Dimitri Roger; Carter; M. Williams; Cubina; Pemberton; S. Lindley; Grant Dickinson	Ye; Ty Dolla Sign; Digital Nas; Ojivolta; the Legendary Traxster; TheLabCook	4:24
13.	"Beg Forgiveness"	Ye; Griffin; Faouzia Ouihya; Miller; Latia Lindley; Hendricks; London Holmes; Kilhoffer; Tiwan Raybon; Goddard; Pappalardo; Beck	Ye; Ty Dolla Sign; JPEGMafia; London on da Track; Kilhoffer; Vitals	6:08
14.	"Good (Don't Die)"	Ye; Griffin; Hashemi; Yonatan Goldstein; William Adams Jr.	Ye; Ty Dolla Sign; Johnny Goldstein; will.i.am	3:19
15.	"Problematic"	Ye; Griffin; Amber Streeter; Melvin Moore; Denzel Charles; Clemons; Njapa; Charles Hugo; Trotter; Jones	Ye; Ty Dolla Sign; 88-Keys; Chad Hugo; Camper	3:14
16.	"King"	Ye; Griffin; Tipton; Victor Mensah; Hendricks; Njapa; Dylan Cleary-Krell; Arturo Fratini; Trotter; Raybon	Ye; Ty Dolla Sign; JPEGMafia; 88-Keys; Dez Wright; Lester Nowhere	2:36
Total length:				55:40

Track notes

- All tracks are stylized in all caps.
- "Stars" features uncredited vocals from Camper.
- "Keys to My Life" features uncredited additional vocals from India Love.
- "Paid" features uncredited vocals from K-Ci.
- "Talking" features uncredited vocals from North West and uncredited additional vocals from James Blake.
- "Back to Me" features uncredited vocals from Freddie Gibbs.
- "Hoodrat" features additional vocals from Mike Tyson.
- "Do It" features uncredited vocals from YG and Nipsey Hussle.
- "Paperwork" features uncredited vocals from Quavo.
- "Fuk Sumn" features uncredited vocals from Playboi Carti and Travis Scott.
- "Vultures" features vocals from Bump J and Lil Durk.
- "Carnival" features additional vocals from Curva Nord Milano ultras.
- "Beg Forgiveness" features uncredited vocals from Chris Brown.
- "Good (Don't Die)" features additional vocals from J. Rey Soul and is absent from streaming versions of the album.

Sample credits

- "Stars" contains samples of "Good Luck", written by Dijon Duenas, Jack Karaszewski and Henry Kwapis, as performed by Dijon.
- "Keys to My Life" contains samples of "Can It Be All So Simple / Intermission", written by Clifford Smith, Robert F. Diggs, Russell T. Jones, Gary E. Grice, Lamont Hawkins, Dennis David Coles, Corey Woods, Marvin Hamlisch, Marilyn Bergman, Alan Bergman and Jason R. Hunter, as performed by Wu-Tang Clan, which itself samples "The Way We Were", written by Alan Bergman, Marilyn Bergman, and Marvin Hamlisch, as performed by Gladys Knight & the Pips.
- "Paid" contains samples of "Brighter Days (Underground Goodies Mix)", written by Dana Lynn Stovall and Curtis Alan Jones, as performed by Cajmere and Dajae; "Get on Up", written by Ivan Guimaraes Lins, Richard Hailey, Dalvin DeGrate, Victor Martins and Joel M. Hailey, as performed by Jodeci; and interpolations of "Roxanne", written by Gordon M. Sumner, as performed by the Police.
- "Back to Me" contains samples of "Rock Box", written by Joseph Ward Simmons, Lawrence Smith and Darryl Matthews McDaniels, as performed by Run-DMC; elements of "Garden", written and performed by Zachary Frenes; and dialogue performed by Jason Mewes from Dogma (1999).
- "Do It" contains interpolations of "Back That Azz Up", written by Terius Gray, Dwayne Michael Carter Jr., and Byron Otto Thomas, as performed by Juvenile, Lil Wayne, and Mannie Fresh.
- "Paperwork" contains samples of "Montagem Faz Macete 3.0", written by Victor Hugo Maciel dos Santos, Bruno Gioia and Kaique Monteiro de Almeida, as performed by DJ Vitinho Beat, DJ Roca, MC Neguin MT and MC Magrinho, and "Ay Si Ñiño" (remix), written by Aderly Ramirez and Leonardo Felipe Yasmil Garces, as performed by Rochy RD and Mafeo 13.
- "Fuk Sumn" contains samples of the original 1994 version of "Smoking on a Junt"', written by Gangsta Blac and DJ Squeeky, as performed by Koopsta Knicca, and "Gorgeous", written by Ronald Nathan LaTour Jr., Jahaan Sweet, Daveon Jackson, Hykeem Jamaal Carter Jr., and Johnny Juliano, as performed by Baby Keem.
- "Carnival" contains samples of "Hell of a Life", written by Mike Caren, Ernest Wilson, Mike Dean, Sylvester Stewart, Tony Joe White, Terence Butler, Anthony Iommi, John Osbourne, William Ward, and Ye, as performed by Ye.
- "Beg Forgiveness" contains interpolations of "Gabriel", written by Joseph Goddard, Valentina Pappalardo, and John Robert Beck, as performed by Joe Goddard and Valentina.
- "Good (Don't Die)" contains interpolations of "I Feel Love", written by Donna Summer, Giorgio Moroder and Pete Bellotte, as performed by Summer.
- "Problematic" contains samples of "Jubilation", as performed by Pierre Henry and Spooky Tooth.
- "King" contains samples of "Hit It Run", as written and performed by Run-DMC; "Crazy Train", written by Bob Daisley, as performed by Ozzy Osbourne; and "Stems", as written and performed by S.Maharba.

== Personnel ==
Credits adapted from Spotify.

- Morning Estrada – recording (1–13)
- Rafael "Fai" Bautista – recording (1–13)
- Mike Tucci – mastering (1–13)
- Marcus Fritz – mixing (12)

== Charts ==
=== Weekly charts ===
Weekly chart performance for Vultures 1
Chart (2024)	Peak position
Australian Albums (ARIA)	1
Australian Hip Hop/R&B Albums (ARIA)	1
Austrian Albums (Ö3 Austria)	1
Belgian Albums (Ultratop Flanders)	1
Belgian Albums (Ultratop Wallonia)	6
Canadian Albums (Billboard)	1
Croatian International Albums (HDU)	28
Czech Albums (ČNS IFPI)	1
Danish Albums (Hitlisten)	1
Dutch Albums (Album Top 100)	1
Finnish Albums (Suomen virallinen lista)	1
French Albums (SNEP)	9
German Albums (Offizielle Top 100)	1
German Albums (Top 20 Hip Hop)	1
Hungarian Albums (MAHASZ)	3
Icelandic Albums (Tónlistinn)	1
Irish Albums (Official Charts)	2
Irish Independent Albums (IRMA)	1
Italian Albums (FIMI)	5
Japanese Digital Albums (Oricon)	20
Japanese Hot Albums (Billboard Japan)	95
Lithuanian Albums (AGATA)	1
New Zealand Albums (RMNZ)	1
Nigerian Albums (TurnTable)	42
Norwegian Albums (VG-lista)	1
Polish Albums (ZPAV)	1
Portuguese Albums (AFP)	1
Slovak Albums (ČNS IFPI)	1
Spanish Albums (Promusicae)	3
Swedish Albums (Sverigetopplistan)	2
Swiss Albums (Schweizer Hitparade)	1
Swiss Hip-Hop Albums (Schweizer Hitparade)	1
UK Albums (Official Charts)	2
UK Independent Albums (Official Charts)	3
UK R&B Albums (Official Charts)	2
US Billboard 200	1
US Independent Albums (Billboard)	1
US Top R&B/Hip-Hop Albums (Billboard)	1

=== Year-end charts ===
Year-end chart performance for Vultures 1
Chart (2024)	Position
Australian Albums (ARIA)	79
Australian Hip Hop/R&B Albums (ARIA)	21
Austrian Albums (Ö3 Austria)	62
Belgian Albums (Ultratop Flanders)	81
Danish Albums (Hitlisten)	36
Dutch Albums (Album Top 100)	77
German Albums (Offizielle Top 100)	86
Hungarian Albums (MAHASZ)	39
Icelandic Albums (Tónlistinn)	9
New Zealand Albums (RMNZ)	33
Polish Albums (ZPAV)	63
Swedish Albums (Sverigetopplistan)	92
Swiss Albums (Schweizer Hitparade)	31
US Billboard 200	68
US Independent Albums (Billboard)	10
US Top R&B/Hip-Hop Albums (Billboard)	26

== Certifications and sales ==
Certifications and sales for Vultures 1
Region	Certification	Certified units/sales
Denmark (IFPI Danmark)	Gold	10,000^{‡}
Iceland	—	1,616
New Zealand (RMNZ)	Gold	7,500^{‡}
United Kingdom (BPI)	Gold	100,000^{‡}
United States (RIAA)	Gold	500,000^{‡}
^{‡} Sales+streaming figures based on certification alone.
