= Wax Motif =

Australian DJ and producer

- Born: Daniel Kin Jun Chien (November 20, 1984)
- Origin: Sydney, New South Wales, Australia
- Genres: Dance; house; bass house
- Occupations: DJ; record producer; songwriter
- Years active: 2008–present
- Labels: Mad Decent; Owsla; Dim Mak; Sweat It Out; Fool's Gold; Strictly Rhythm
- Website: waxmotif.com

Danny Chien (born November 20, 1984), better known by his stage name Wax Motif, is an Australian DJ and record producer based in Los Angeles, California, United States.

== Career ==
Wax Motif's work has drawn critical acclaim and support from Diplo, Major Lazer, A-Trak, GTA, Oliver Heldens, Jauz, Tommy Trash.

Wax Motif is known for his contribution to the G-House movement. Wax Motif worked with Destructo for his album on Interscope. They worked with Ty Dolla Sign, YG, Young Thug, Problem, Warren G. His DJ sets incorporate this style heavily into his mixing.

In an interview with Thump, Wax Motif claims his influences range from R&B, to disco and UK bass. His debut EP for Mad Decent, True Joy is a reflection of this multi-genre approach, with a G-house focus.

Wax Motif has performed at EDC Las Vegas, New York, and Mexico, Electric Zoo, HARD Summer, Day of the Dead, Holy Ship, Stereosonic, and Splendor in the Grass.

He has released tracks and remixes through A-Trak's Fool's Gold, Skrillex's Owsla, Steve Aoki's Dim Mak Records. A compilation on legendary label Strictly Rhythm as well as a host of remixes for YG, Young Thug, Kid Ink, Chromeo, Deadmau5, Warren G's "Regulate" and more.

Wax Motif wrote and produced on the track "Back to Me" from ¥$ (Kanye West and Ty Dolla Sign) album Vultures 1, released on 10 February 2024.

== Discography ==
=== Extended plays ===
Title	Details
True Joy	Released: 14 August 2015; Label: Mad Decent; Formats: Digital download
Tokyo	Released: 21 July 2017; Label: Confession; Formats: Digital download
Forsaken	Released: 15 December 2017; Label: Night Bass Records; Formats: Digital download

=== Singles ===
==== As lead artist ====
Title	Year	Album
"Celine"	2011	Non-album singles
"Used 2 Be" (featuring Jevon Doe)	2017	Non-album singles
"Unraveling" (featuring Kaelyn Behr)	2018	Non-album singles
"Static Theory" (with Warez)	2019	Non-album singles

==== As collaborator ====
Title	Year	Peak chart positions	Album
Title	Year	US Dance	Album
"All Night Man" (with Hunter Siegel)	2014	—	Non-album singles
"Hex" (with Tommy Trash)	2014	—	Non-album singles
"Get It All" (with GTA)	2016	42	Good Times Ahead
"Catching Plays" (with Destructo, feat. Pusha T & Starrah)	2016	—	Renegade EP
"Crazy" (with Vindata)	2016	—	Non-album singles
"Five Alarm" (with Angelz)	2017	—	Non-album singles
"Mental" (with Ricci)	2017	—	Forsaken EP
"I Can't Hold On" (with GTA and Dillon Francis featuring Anna Lunoe)	2018	—	Death To Genres Vol. III
"Love to the World" (with Diplo)	2020	48	Do You Dance?
"Thrills" (with Jaxon Rose)	2021	—	Non-album singles
"See In Color" (with 220 KID)	2023	_	Non-album singles
"212" (with Truth X Lies featuring AK Renny)	2024	—	
"—" denotes a recording that did not chart or was not released.

==== As featured artist ====
Title	Year	Album
"New Beginnings" (Lil Boíí Kantu prod. Wax Motif, Trackbangas, & Ely Rise)	2018	Non-album single
"Undo (Back To My Heart)" (Tinashe featuring Wax Motif)	2021	333

=== Remixes ===
==== 2014 ====
- Tinashe – 2 On (feat. Schoolboy Q) (Wax Motif Remix)
- YG – "My Nigga" (feat. Jeezy & Rich Homie Quan) (Destructo & Wax Motif Remix)
- Warren G – Regulate (Destructo & Wax Motif Remix)

==== 2015 ====
- Kid Ink – Be Real (feat. Dej Loaf) (Wax Motif & Gladiator Remix)
- Etnik – Unclassified (Wax Motif Remix)

==== 2017 ====
- Major Lazer – Run Up (feat. PartyNextDoor & Nicki Minaj) (Wax Motif Remix)
- AC Slater & Chris Lorenzo – Fly Kicks (Wax Motif Remix)
