= Hoodrat =

2024 song by Kanye West and Ty Dolla Sign

Song by ¥$

from the album Vultures 1
- Released: February 10, 2024
- Recorded: 2023
- Genre: Hip-hop
- Length: 3:42
- Label: YZY
- Songwriters: Ye; Tyrone Griffin Jr.; Charles Njapa; Darhyl Camper Jr.; Malik Jones; Robert Booker
- Producers: Ye; Ty Dolla Sign; 88-Keys; Camper

"Hoodrat" (stylized in all caps) is a song by the American hip-hop superduo ¥$, composed of rapper Kanye West and singer Ty Dolla Sign from their debut studio album, Vultures 1 (2024). It was written and produced by the duo alongside 88-Keys and Camper, who all co-wrote the song with Malik Yusef and TrueFaithWalker. It features an excerpt of an interview from Mike Tyson, highlighting West's skill as a leader despite his mental issues.

Upon its release, The song charted at number 67 on the Billboard Hot 100 and peaked at number 31 on the Hot R&B/Hip-Hop Songs chart, both in the United States. The song also made charts in Australia, Canada, Iceland, Lithuania, Poland, Portugal, and the United Kingdom, where the song reached its ultimate peak at number 17 on the UK Independent Singles Chart. The song additionally charted at number 81 on Billboard's Global 200 chart.

== Background ==
In a 2020 interview, boxer Mike Tyson said that West sounds like a leader in spite of his mental health issues. Tyson commented that West is deluded enough to believe he is God-like, referencing his 2013 track "I Am a God". The boxer later questioned people saying West was right after his alleged antisemitism in 2023, feeling he had potential to incite hateful groups like Nazis. West and Tyson met in Saudi Arabia during October, the same time the rapper was working on the album.

== Composition ==
The chorus of "Hoodrat" features monotonous sirens, which chant its title repeatedly. The outro features an excerpt from the Tyson interview, asserting that West has "some mental fuckin' issues" like most leaders do. Tyson acknowledges how West thinks he is a God, concluding that the rapper's detractors recognize his greatness and his words are "basically affirmations for success".

== Commercial performance ==
In the United States, the song charted at number 67 on the Billboard Hot 100 and peaked at number 31 on the Hot R&B/Hip-Hop Songs chart. In Australia, the song peaked at number 88 on the Australian Recording Industry Association's (ARIA) Australian Singles Chart, and peaked at number 26 on the Australia Hip-Hop/R&B chart. In Canada, the song charted at number 57 on the Canadian Hot 100. In Iceland, the song charted at number 24 on the Tónlistinn charts. In Lithuania, the song charted at number 64 on the AGATA charts. In Poland, the song charted at number 87 on the Polish Streaming Top 100. In Portugal, the song charted on Associação Fonográfica Portuguesa's (AFP) Portuguese Singles Chart. In the United Kingdom, the song charted at number 17 on the UK Independent Singles Chart. The song also charted at number 81 on Billboard's Global 200.

== Charts ==
Chart performance for "Hoodrat"
Chart (2024)	Peak position
Australia (ARIA)	88
Australia Hip Hop/R&B (ARIA)	26
Canada Hot 100 (Billboard)	57
Global 200 (Billboard)	81
Iceland (Tónlistinn)	24
Lithuania (AGATA)	64
Poland (Polish Streaming Top 100)	87
Portugal (AFP)	104
UK Indie (Official Charts)	17
US Billboard Hot 100	67
US Hot R&B/Hip-Hop Songs (Billboard)	31
