= Gabriel (Joe Goddard song) =

Single by Joe Goddard featuring Valentina
- Released: 31 July 2011
- Recorded: 2011
- Genre: Electronic
- Length: 4:19
- Label: Greco-Roman
- Songwriter(s): John Beck, Joe Goddard, Valentina Pappalardo
- Producer(s): Joe Goddard

Joe Goddard singles chronology
"Apple Bobbing" (2009)	"Gabriel" (2011)

"Gabriel" is a song written by Joe Goddard, Valentina, and John Beck and produced by Joe Goddard, featuring vocals from Valentina. It was released as a Digital download in the United Kingdom on 31 July 2011. It peaked to number 49 on the UK Singles Chart and 12 on the Belgian (Flemish) Singles Chart. A remix of the song is featured on the video game Grand Theft Auto V in the radio station Soulwax FM.

== Music video ==
A music video to accompany the release of "Gabriel" was first released onto YouTube on 31 August 2011 at a total length of three minutes and forty-four seconds. The video is by Utile Creative and Jazz Goddard.

== Track listing ==
- UK Digital EP
1. "Gabriel" (feat. Valentina) - 5:36
2. "All I Know" - 9:22
3. "Jump" - 6:28
4. "Gabriel" (Dub) (feat. Valentina) - 7:05

== Chart performance ==
Chart (2011)	Peak position
Belgium (Ultratop 50 Flanders)	12
Belgium (Ultratip Bubbling Under Wallonia)	28
Netherlands (Single Top 100)	44
UK Singles (The Official Charts Company)	49
UK Indie (OCC)	8

== Release history ==
Country	Release date	Format	Label
United Kingdom	31 July 2011	Digital download	Greco-Roman
Belgium	23 September 2011	Digital download	Greco-Roman
