= Fuk Sumn =

2024 song by Kanye West and Ty Dolla Sign

Song by ¥$ featuring Playboi Carti and Travis Scott

from the album Vultures 1
- Released: February 10, 2024
- Genre: Rage; Memphis rap
- Length: 3:29
- Label: YZY
- Songwriters: Ye; Tyrone Griffin Jr.; Jordan Carter; Jacques Webster II; Robert Cooper; Aswad Asif; Paul Beauregard; Barrington Hendricks; Che Pope; Christopher Dotson; Hubert E. Polinski; Reverend W. A. Donaldson; Kobe Hood; Konrad Żyrek; Samuel Lindley; Quavious Marshall; Quentin Miller; Robert Mosley; Timothy Mosley; Charles Njapa
- Producers: Ye; Ty Dolla Sign; 88-Keys; AyoAa; BbyKobe; Che Pope; Chrishan; Digital Nas; Hubi; JPEGMafia; The Legendary Traxster; Shdøw; Timbaland

"Fuk Sumn" (stylized in all caps) is a song by the American hip-hop superduo ¥$, composed of rapper Kanye West and singer Ty Dolla Sign, featuring American rappers Playboi Carti and Travis Scott, from the duo's debut studio album, Vultures 1 (2024). It was produced by the duo along with 88-Keys, AyoAA, BbyKobe, Che Pope, Chrishan, Digital Nas, Hubi, JPEGMafia, the Legendary Traxster, Shdøw, and Timbaland. The song contains samples of the original 1994 version of "Smoking on a Junt" by Koopsta Knicca, "Stud-Spider" by Tony Joe White, and vocal samples from "Funky President (People It's Bad)" by James Brown and "Baptizing Scene" by Reverend W.A. Donaldson.

Timbaland became involved with "Fuk Sumn" in December 2023 and invited fellow producers Shdøw and Hubi to contribute, who ended up providing the majority of its production. American rapper Quavo originally featured on the song, as played at listening events for the album, but was later removed in favor of Scott. A music video was filmed in January 2024 but ultimately remained unreleased.

Upon the release of Vultures 1, "Fuk Sumn" received favorable reviews from music critics, who often praised its production and guest appearances. Commercially, the song peaked at number 23 on the Billboard Hot 100 and number ten on the US Hot R&B/Hip-Hop Songs chart, alongside multiple countries.

In March 2024, JPEGMafia played an alternate version of the song at Pitchfork Music Festival CDMX, featuring alternate production and Quavo's verse. In November 2024, West and Ty Dolla Sign were sued by several Memphis rap artists over an alleged sample of "Drank a Yak (Part 2)" used in the track, although Ty Dolla Sign later had his name removed from the lawsuit; it was later settled in March 2026.

== Background and recording ==
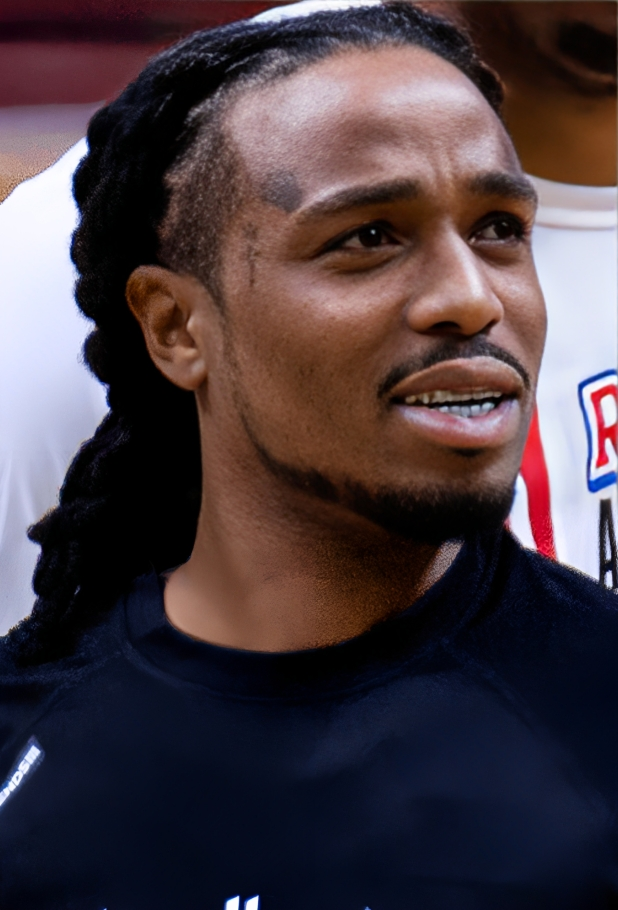
"Fuk Sumn" originally contained a verse by Quavo, which was played at multiple listening events for Vultures 1.

In December 2023, Shdøw became involved with "Fuk Sumn" after record producer Timbaland sent him the song's a cappella, asking him to create his own version. He worked on it overnight, as the rest of the Vultures 1 team was currently in Miami, Florida, which he described as "exhausting but worth it." At roughly 4 a.m., he invited frequent collaborator Hubi to help him finish its beat over Discord, completing it 4 hours later. The day after, West played their version at a Jamaican bar in Miami, which Shdøw and Hubi described as feeling "surreal". West and Ty Dolla Sign later posted a tracklist containing "Fuk Sumn" online. According to Hubi, this version of the song is only slightly different compared to the one that was released.

Versions of "Fuk Sumn" previewed at listening events for Vultures 1 originally featured vocals from American rapper Quavo, which were later removed in favor of Travis Scott. His removal received generally negative reception from fans, who overwhelmingly preferred his verse to Scott's. In January 2024, footage of West, Ty Dolla Sign, and Playboi Carti recording a music video for the song appeared online. Filmed outside of Wet in Las Vegas, Nevada, the video failed to be released after being recorded. On February 10, Vultures 1 was released to digital download and streaming services, with "Fuk Sumn" included as the album's tenth track.

On March 6, 2024, JPEGMafia played alternate versions of "Fuk Sumn" and "Paid" during his performance at Pitchfork Music Festival CDMX in Mexico, which featured additional production done by him. This version of "Fuk Sumn" reinstates Quavo's verse, has a darker atmosphere, is structured differently, and uses different percussion. Gabriel Bras Nevares of HotNewHipHop praised this version, saying it "made fans in the crowd go ballistic." Quavo reposted a video of JPEGMafia's performance, captioning it "give em what they want" in reference to his removed verse.

== Composition ==
Musically, "Fuk Sumn" has been characterized as incorporating elements of rage and Memphis rap. It contains vocal samples from "Funky President (People It's Bad)" by James Brown and "Baptizing Scene" by Reverend W.A Donaldson. Samples of "Smoking on a Junt" by Koopsta Knicca and "Stud-Spider" by Tony Joe White are also used throughout. The song's production contains bass, which becomes louder during West's verse.

The lyrics of "Fuk Sumn" revolve around each artist describing their sexual fantasies, with Ty Dolla Sign singing its chorus. Carti raps in a lower register than usual, asking "Shawty wanna fuck?" during the song's post-chorus. West's lines "Shawty wanna fuck on somethin' / Fuck on me, suck on me publicly" reference rumors that West had received oral sex from his wife Bianca Censori during a boat ride in Venice in September 2023, which caused him and Censori to receive a lifetime ban from the gondola company due to acts of public indecency.

== Critical reception ==
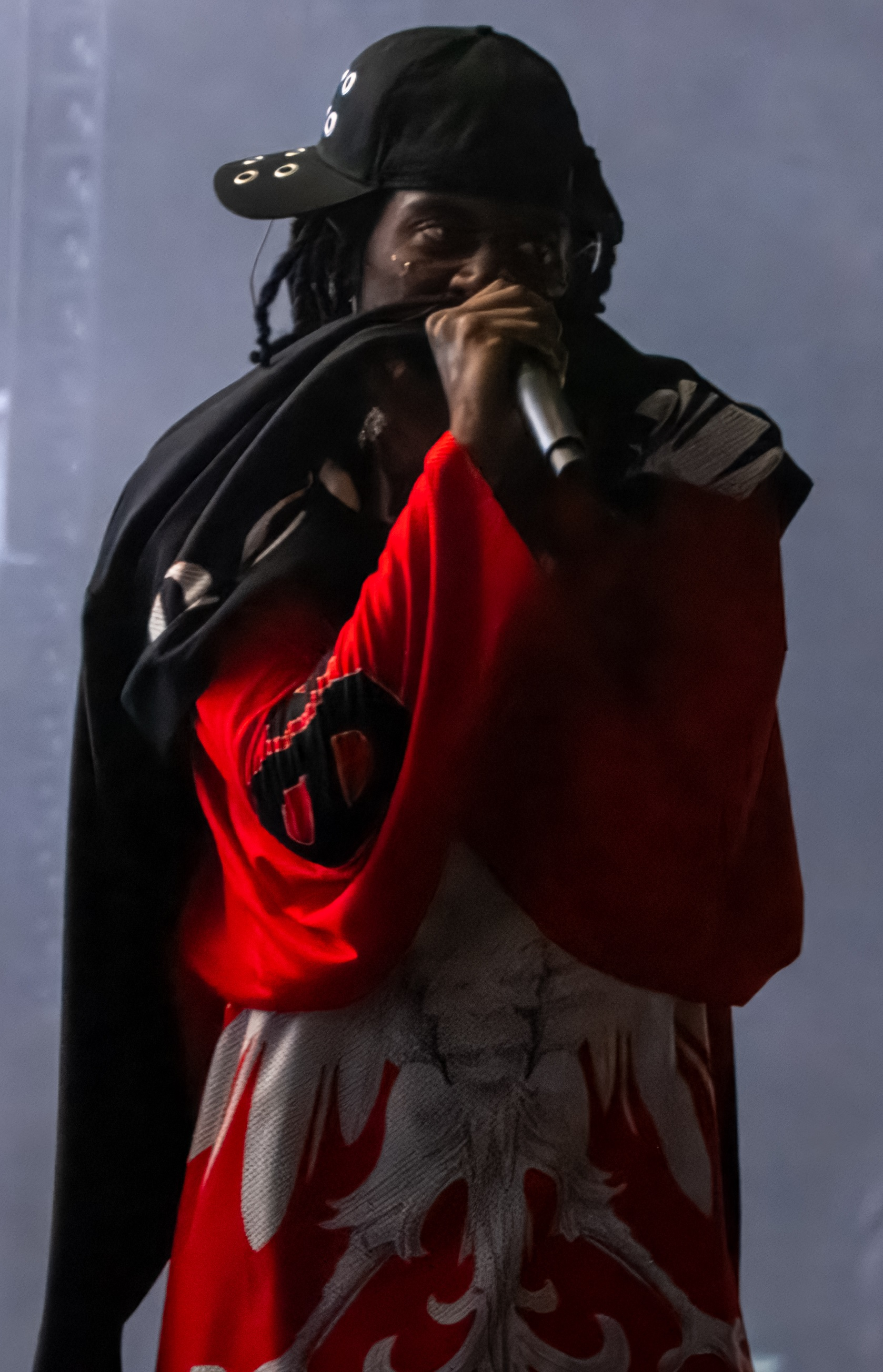
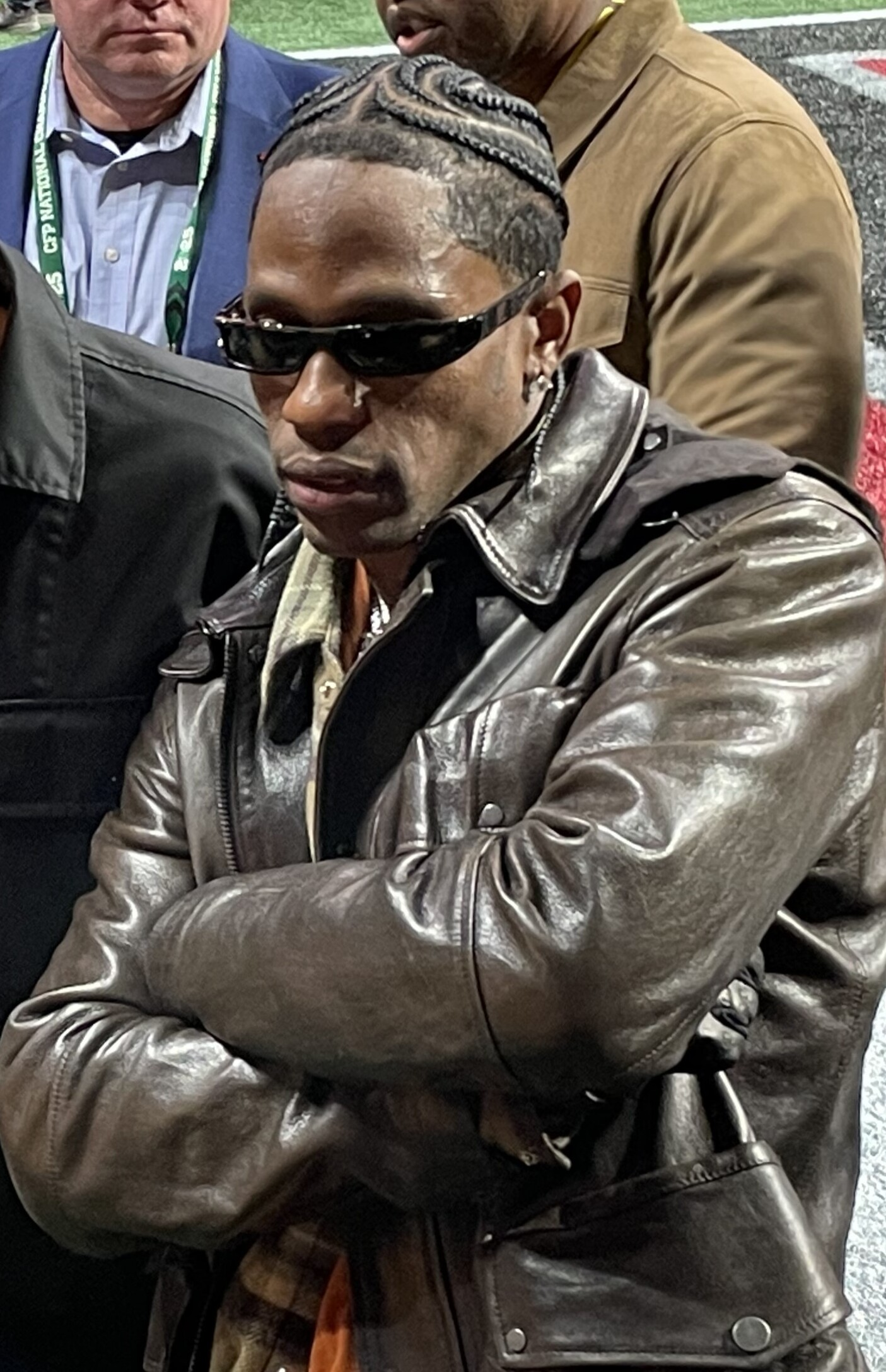
Playboi Carti (left) and Scott's (right) guest verses on "Fuk Sumn" were often praised by critics.

'Fuk Sumn" received generally favorable reviews from music critics. Scott Glaysher of HipHopDX wrote that Ty Dolla Sign's crooning on the song is "standout". Aron A. of HotNewHipHop considered Carti's feature one of two "stellar performances" on Vultures 1 (along with his appearance on "Carnival"), feeling that "Evolving his delivery from a deeper register adds a level of curiosity to his flow", and used Carti asking "Shawty wanna fuck?" as an example where he comes off as "almost whimsically inquisitive". Fred Thomas of AllMusic opined that Carti and Scott "add personality to the eerie, nocturnal bump" of the track.

In a review of the song itself, HotNewHipHop's Zachary Horvath praised it for "recruit[ing] the ultimate ragers [Scott and Carti]", as well as each producer's contributions being balanced. Though he wishes Quavo's verse was kept, he felt that "Scott fits right at home on this one. He goes old La Flame in the best way possible." Horvath referred to the song's lyrics as "fairly boring" but said that this was overshadowed by the beat switches, concluding that "'Fuk Sumn' is not about penmanship, it is about having fun and it certainly delivers on that front."

== Commercial performance ==
In the United States, "Fuk Sumn" made its debut on the Billboard Hot 100 and Hot R&B/Hip-Hop Songs chart on the week of February 24, 2024, making its highest peaks at number 23 and number 10, respectively. The song remained in the Hot 100 for five weeks, while it lasted an additional week on the Hot R&B/Hip-Hop Songs chart. It also peaked at number 13 on the Global 200. "Fuk Sumn" additionally made three chart appearances in the United Kingdom, peaking at number 100 on UK Singles, while making greater success with a peak of number 18 on Hip-Hop/R&B Singles and number five on Indie Singles. In Australia, it peaked at number 33 on its main singles chart, with an addition of peaking at number eleven on its Hip-Hop/R&B Singles chart. Internationally, "Fuk Sumn" made appearances in charts from Austria, Canada, Denmark, France, Germany, Iceland, Latvia, Lithuania, New Zealand, Poland, Portugal, Sweden, Switzerland, and the United Arab Emirates.

== Lawsuit ==
In November 2024, West and Ty Dolla Sign were sued by several Memphis rap artists over allegedly sampling the song "Drank a Yak (Part 2)" for the intro of "Fuk Sumn", which they described as a "blatant" and "brazen" stealing of the former song. Criminal Manne, DJ Squeeky, and the estate of Kilo G filed the suit, alleging that West reached out to clear the sample after Vultures 1 had already been released. However, negotiations stalled months later, as "[West] had fired his entire legal and business team, leaving him without any legal representation", with the Plaintiffs being told they had to wait for contact from West's new legal representation. Negotiations started after West obtained a new lawyer, although the lawyer's position was short-lived. According to the lawsuit, "After numerous unsuccessful attempts at resolving this matter directly with the responsible parties, plaintiffs have been left with no other method of recourse than to bring this cause of action".

On July 30, 2025, Billboard reported that Ty Dolla Sign was no longer named in the lawsuit after signing a preliminary settlement. As a result, he was no longer named as a co-defendant, and only West would be involved in the suit. According to court filings from March 18, 2026, the lawsuit was settled after both parties "reached a settlement agreement in principle resolving all claims between them" and began finalizing a deal, though no specifics were provided.

== Credits and personnel ==
Credits are adapted from Spotify and Apple Music.

- Ye – vocals, writing, production
- Tyrone Griffin Jr. – vocals, writing, production
- Jordan Carter – vocals, writing
- Jacques Webster II – vocals, writing
- Robert Cooper (Koopsta Knicca) – vocals (sample), writing
- Aswad Asif (AyoAA) – writing, production
- Barrington Hendricks – writing, production
- Kobe Hood (BbyKobe) – writing, production
- Samuel Lindley – writing, production
- Timothy Mosley – writing, production
- Charles Njapa – writing, production
- Che Pope – writing, production
- Hubert E. Polinski (Hubi) – writing, production
- Konrad Żyrek (Shdøw) – writing, production
- Christopher Dotson – writing, production
- Paul Beauregard – writing
- Reverend W. A. Donaldson – writing
- Quavious Marshall – writing
- Quentin Miller – writing
- Robert Mosley – writing
- Digital Nas – production
- Rafael Fai Bautista – recording engineer
- Morning Estrada – recording engineer
- Mike Tucci – mastering engineer

== Charts ==
Chart performance for "Fuk Sumn"
Chart (2024)	Peak position
Australia (ARIA)	33
Australia Hip Hop/R&B (ARIA)	11
Austria (Ö3 Austria Top 40)	20
Canada Hot 100 (Billboard)	17
Denmark (Tracklisten)	32
France (SNEP)	181
Germany (GfK)	98
Global 200 (Billboard)	13
Iceland (Tónlistinn)	3
Italy (FIMI)	94
Latvia Streaming (LaIPA)	2
Lithuania (AGATA)	47
New Zealand (Recorded Music NZ)	21
Poland Streaming (OLiS)	16
Portugal (AFP)	32
Sweden (Sverigetopplistan)	60
Switzerland (Schweizer Hitparade)	24
United Arab Emirates (IFPI)	16
UK Singles (Official Charts)	100
UK Hip Hop/R&B (Official Charts)	18
UK Indie (Official Charts)	5
US Billboard Hot 100	23
US Hot R&B/Hip-Hop Songs (Billboard)	10
