= Back to Me (¥$ song) =

2024 song by Kanye West and Ty Dolla Sign

Song by ¥$ featuring Freddie Gibbs

from the album Vultures 1
- Released: February 10, 2024
- Recorded: 2023–2024
- Genre: Hip-hop; comedy hip-hop
- Length: 4:55
- Label: YZY
- Songwriters: Ye; Tyrone Griffin Jr.; Aswad Asif; Charles Njapa; Daniel Kin Chien; Darryl McDaniels; François Beaune; Frederick Tipton; James Hau; Joseph Simmons; Lawrence Smith; Michael Dean; Nasir Pemberton; Nicholas Balding; Quavious Marshall; Sasha Hashemi; Zachary Frenes
- Producers: Ye; Ty Dolla Sign; 88-Keys; Anthony Kilhoffer; AyoAA; Count Bassy; Digital Nas; Feez; Nic Nac; Wax Motif

"Back to Me" (stylized in all caps) is a song by the American hip-hop superduo ¥$, composed of rapper Kanye West and singer Ty Dolla Sign, featuring American rapper Freddie Gibbs, from the duo's debut studio album, Vultures 1 (2024). It features additional vocals from American rapper Quavo. The duo produced the song alongside 88-Keys, Anthony Kilhoffer, AyoAA, Count Bassy, Digital Nas, Zach Frenes (credited as Feez), Nic Nac, and Wax Motif. Except for Kilhoffer, they all wrote it with Gibbs, Quavo, François Beaune, Sasha Hashemi, and Mike Dean. It contains samples of "Rock Box" by Run-DMC and the film Dogma (1999), with the writers of "Rock Box" receiving credits as well.

Upon the release of Vultures 1, "Back to Me" received generally positive reviews music critics, who often praised Gibbs's performance on the song and the production. Reception to West's contributions were critical however, often due to its lyrical content. The song was also a commercial success, peaking at number 26 on the US Billboard Hot 100, and charted within the top-40 of several other countries. The song was Gibbs's first entry on the Hot 100. An advertisement featuring the song was intended to be aired during the Super Bowl LVIII, but was replaced with a video of West talking to his iPhone camera. Before its release, it was planned to have an accompanying music video, as described in a February 2025 lawsuit filed against West.

== Background ==
While recording Vultures 1 in Italy, West asked his daughter North for advice on "Back to Me", asking if she liked a line that appeared midway into the song. North replied by saying that she liked the song, suggesting that West should simply say what he feels. Recounting the session in a March 2024 interview with Big Boy TV, West said that, "[s]ometimes I feel like my mom speaks through her." The song was debuted during the Vultures Rave listening party on December 12, 2023.

In February 2025, West was sued by an anonymous ex-Yeezy employee who alleged that West subjected her to a "'calculated campaign' of harassment, discrimination, antisemitism and sexism" after learning of her Jewish identity. In one of the lawsuits pages, West sends her a screenshot of a website called "backtomevideo.com", with an advertisement reading "GOT BIG TITTIES? SIGN UP HERE TO BE FEATURED IN NEW ¥$ MUSIC VIDEO", indicating that "Back to Me" was intended to have a music video. The picture, dated January 10, 2024, shows a nude female above the page's text, who has unusually large breasts. The website has since been taken down, and archived versions feature a different image and caption.

== Composition ==
"Back to Me" features a "crisp" drum break and "ethereal" vocal samples. Steven J. Horowitz of Variety compared the song's "rolling drums and bleating bass line" to that of West's 2010 single "Runaway".

"Back to Me" uses a sample and interpolation of the character Jay's lines from the film Dogma (1999): "I fell in love with you, we fell in love with you! Guys like us just don't fall out of the fucking sky, you know?" and "Beautiful, naked, big-titty womеn just don't fall out the sky, you know?" West's interpolation of these lines is comedic in nature, as he raps them at a fast pace.

== Release and promotion ==
"Back to Me" was released on February 10, 2024, as the fifth track from Vultures 1. On the same day, West revealed a commcercial he intended to display during that year's Super Bowl. The minimalist video features a woman running on a treadmill as "Back to Me" plays in the background. Due to the woman's clothing, which includes a see-through tank top, many of West's fans doubted that the advertisement would be played on live television. The commercial was later scrapped, and was replaced by a video of West talking to his iPhone camera inside of a car.

== Critical reception ==
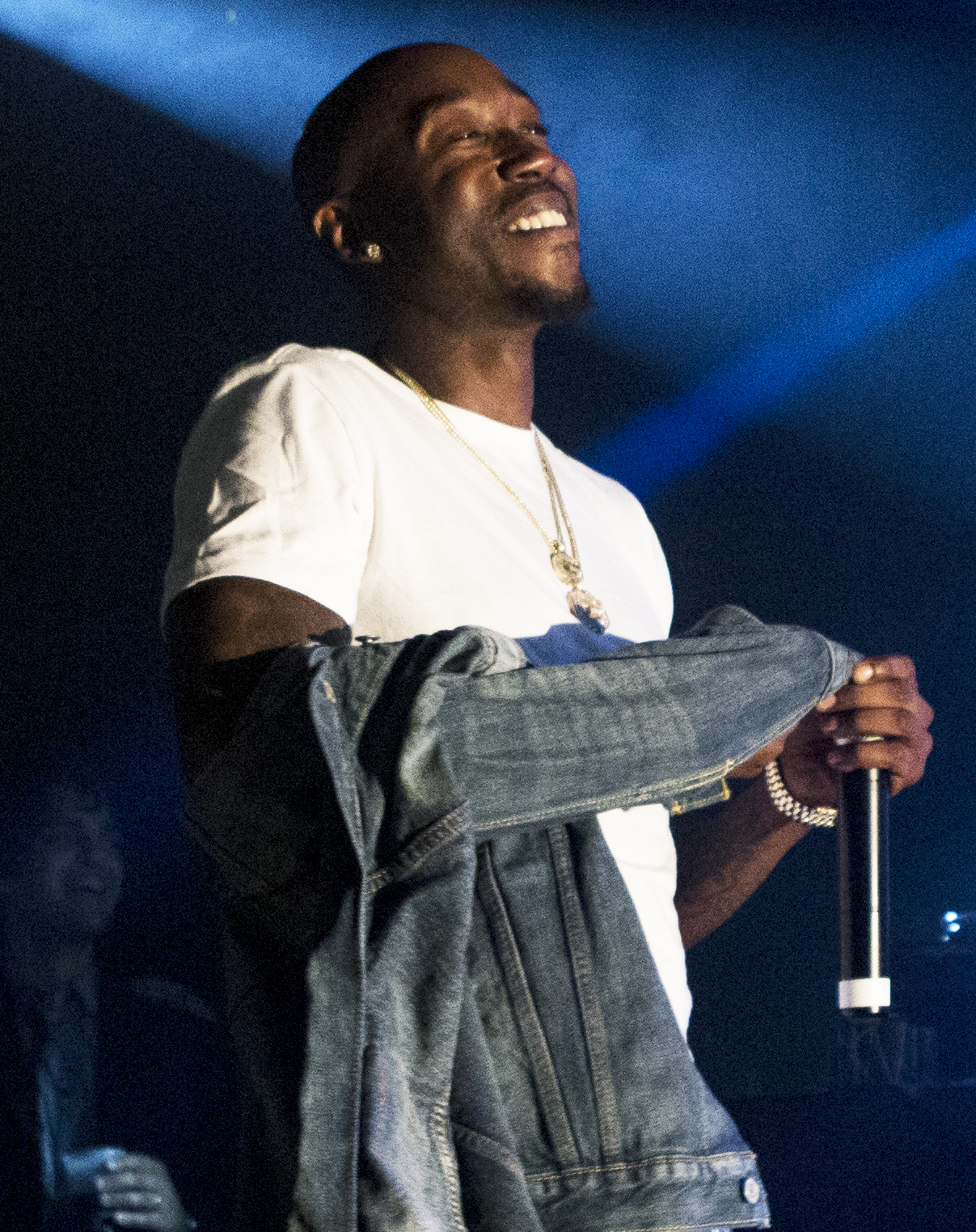
Critics often praised Freddie Gibbs's performance on "Back to Me", considering it the song's highlight.

The song received generally positive reviews from music critics, with particular praise towards Freddie Gibbs's performance. Gabriel Bras Nevares of HotNewHipHop said that Gibbs's performance "display[ed] why he's one of the best spitters in the game right now", additionally remarking that: "Say what you will about Ye, his collaborators, and the ugly parts of this rollout, release, and platform, but talking strictly about the music, the effort here is undeniable." In a negative review of Vultures 1, The Guardian journalist Alexis Petridis stated that the standard of West's lyrics is "thrown into stark relief by an exceptionally snappy guest verse from Indiana MC Freddie Gibbs on Back to Me". Writing for Rolling Stone, Jayson Buford commented, "Freddie Gibbs, another eccentric loudmouth, shows up on 'Back to Me' and although the production on that song sounds like the ending to an HBO series, Gibbs's verse is strong."

HotNewHipHop's Aron A. wrote that "Freddie Gibbs delivers the verse of the album, if not the year so far on 'Back To Me.' He swiftly turns Ye's cheeky interpolation of Jay's 'beautiful big t*tty women just don't fall out the sky you know' into a katana-sharp verse that's equally playful and gruff with bars like, 'Turn a bird bitch to my X like I was Elon.'" For AllMusic, Fred Thomas said that, "[a] robust verse from Freddie Gibbs comes close to salvaging the otherwise uncalled-for filler of 'Back to Me'". Reviewing Vultures 1 for HipHopDX, Scott Glaysher felt the song is "where things get a little strange, not necessarily for Kanye, but by listeners' standards". Regarding the use of lines from Dogma, Glaysher stated that "Ye and Ty Dolla's creative output gets a little mundane when they simply repeat the actor's soundbite with some programmed drums underneath." He described Gibbs's verse as "fierce".

Naming Gibbs's verse as the eighth best rap verse of 2024, Billboard's Michael Saponara wrote that it was the most memorable part of "Back to Me", noting that his "bristling verse was so well-received at listening parties before the official version hit streaming services that West and Ty Dolla $ign removed Quavo's verse altogether."

== Personnel ==
Credits are adapted from Spotify, Apple Music, and the BMI Repertoire. (Note: Find additional credits for the song on the BMI Repertoire by searching the work number #66250496.)

- Ye – vocals, writing, production
- Tyrone Griffin Jr. – vocals, writing, production
- Frederick Tipton – vocals, writing
- Quavious Marshall – vocals, writing
- Aswad Asif – writing, production
- Charles Njapa – writing, production
- Daniel Kin Chien – writing, production
- James Hau (Count Bassy) – writing, production
- Nasir Pemberton – writing, production
- Nicholas Balding – writing, production
- Zachary Frenes (Feez) – writing, production
- Darryl McDaniels – writing
- François Beaune – writing
- Joseph Simmons – writing
- Lawrence Smith – writing
- Michael Dean – writing
- Sasha Hashemi – writing
- Anthony Kilhoffer – production
- Rafael Fai Bautista – recording engineer
- Morning Estrada – recording engineer
- Mike Tucci – mastering engineer

== Charts ==
Chart performance for "Back to Me"
Chart (2024)	Peak position
Australia (ARIA)	27
Australia Hip Hop/R&B (ARIA)	7
Canada Hot 100 (Billboard)	22
Denmark (Tracklisten)	29
Global 200 (Billboard)	16
Iceland (Tónlistinn)	5
Ireland (IRMA)	21
Latvia (LAIPA)	5
Netherlands (Single Top 100)	49
New Zealand (Recorded Music NZ)	19
Poland (Polish Streaming Top 100)	35
Portugal (AFP)	38
South Africa (TOSAC)	17
Sweden (Sverigetopplistan)	56
UK Singles (Official Charts)	18
UK Indie (Official Charts)	4
UK Hip Hop/R&B (Official Charts)	5
US Billboard Hot 100	26
US Hot R&B/Hip-Hop Songs (Billboard)	11
