= Lonely Roads =

2025 song by King Combs, Kanye West and North West

Promotional single by King Combs, Kanye West and North West featuring Jasmine Williams

from the EP Never Stop
- Released: March 15, 2025
- Length: 3:44
- Songwriters: Kanye West; Christian Combs; Mario Winans; Steven Jordan; Carlos Coleman; Justin Dior Combs; Sean Combs; North West; Jasmine Williams
- Producers: Kanye West; Martio Winans; Stevie J; Justin Dior Combs

"Lonely Roads" (originally "Lonely Roads Still Go to Sunshine") is a song by American rappers King Combs, Kanye West, and North West, featuring singer Jasmine Williams. (Note: Credited on streaming as "JAAS") The song originally featured Combs's father Diddy. It was written by West, Combs, North, and Williams themselves, alongside Diddy, King Los, Mario Winans, Stevie J, and Justin Dior Combs; the latter three produced the track alongside West.

It was exclusively released to West's X account as "Lonely Roads Still Go to Sunshine" on March 15, 2025, who claimed the song was for an upcoming Diddy album executively produced by him. On June 27, the song was released as the opening track to West and King Combs' collaborative extended play (EP) Never Stop under the shortened title "Lonely Roads", with the vocals from Diddy and West removed. Its release was followed by a music video for the song, released on September 19.

== Background and recording ==
Kanye West built a working relationship with Diddy throughout the 2000s and 2010s, with West admitting that Diddy was an influence on his music. Their first collaboration together was when West produced the track "Everything I Love" from Diddy's album Press Play (2006). West joined Diddy's production team The Hitmen in 2015, and Diddy contributed to West's single "All Day" that same year. West paid tribute to Diddy when receiving the Lifetime Achievement Award at the BET Awards, but their relationship soured after Diddy criticized his decision to wear a White Lives Matter shirt in October 2022. After appearing at the Grammy Awards in February 2025, West unexpectedly began to show support for Diddy's trial, pleading with president Donald Trump to pardon him via his X account and lamenting the celebrities that "watch our brother rot and never say shit".

According to King Combs, West first proposed the idea of a collaborative EP between the two after plans for West's Yeezy brand to collaborate with Diddy's fashion company Sean John fell through during late 2024. Initially, West's idea for the project was an EP consisting of 5 tracks instead of the 7 present on the released version. Combs recounted in an interview with Hot97 that they created the beat for "Lonely Roads" from scratch during a studio session at West's warehouse studio before West further developed it. West's daughter North was present during this session and was "real eager" to work with them, with West suggesting that she record for the song.

Before the original release of "Lonely Roads", West's ex-wife Kim Kardashian texted him, informing him that she had trademarked North's name to prevent her from featuring on the song. She claimed that the two had mutually agreed to let her trademark their children's names during their marriage so no one else could use them. The agreement also outlined that North would be in control of her own trademark once she turned eighteen. West stood by his decision to release the song, telling Kardashian to "amend" the trademark or else he would "[go] to war [with her]. And neither of us will recover from the public fallout. You're going to have to kill me."

== Release and reception ==
Avatar of ye

ye
(@kanyewest)
tweeted:

LONELY ROADS STILL GO TO SUNSHINE new song by PUFF DADDY feat. His son KING COMBS my daughter NORTH WEST and new Yeezy artist from Chicago Jasmine Williams

March 15, 2025

"Lonely Roads" was released to West's X account as "Lonely Roads Still Go to Sunshine" on March 15, 2025. In a tweet made along with the release, he revealed that Jasmine Williams, a previously obscure artist, had been signed to his YZY record label prior to the song's release. The song was later featured on Never Stop, by King Combs executive produced by West, released on June 27, 2025 under the shortened title "Lonely Roads". This version removes the intro phone call between West and Diddy, and originally credited West as a main artist alongside King Combs.

"Lonely Roads" received negative reception upon its original release, including from fans. Caitlin Moran of The Times called North's guest verse "in no way a useful career step for her", seeing it as "[allowing] West to continue his demented psychological warfare against his ex-wife — at the expense of their child."

== Music video ==
On September 18, Combs released a music video for "Lonely Roads". The video explores what Combs describes as "one of the darkest times” in his life. The music video documents Combs spending time with his siblings at their father's home. Certain shots contain Combs's late mother, Kim Porter, and Diddy.
