= Hooligans (group) =

Vocal group formed by Kanye West

- The Hooligans in March 2025

Background information
- Also known as: Hooligan Choir
- Origin: Los Angeles, California, U.S.
- Genre: Hip-hop
- Years active: 2024 (first iteration); 2025–present (second iteration)
- Members: Kanye West (director); Alonzo Easter; Mauricé Hemmans

The Hooligans (also referred to as the Hooligan Choir) are a vocal group led by American rapper Kanye West. Prior to their formation, West had used the "Hooligans" name in reference to the Curva Nord Milan ultras, whom he previously collaborated with on his 2024 songs with Ty Dolla Sign: "Stars", "Carnival", "Like That Remix", "Time Moving Slow", and "Fried".

In March 2025, West created a casting call for a new Hooligans group in Los Angeles, California, coinciding with a similar call for new members of the Sunday Service Choir. This incarnation appeared on his controversial 2025 single "Heil Hitler", as well as its censored version, "Hallelujah". They have since performed the track at various locations, and are believed to be based in West's Los Angeles warehouse, which he had been using as a headquarters.

== History ==
=== First iteration ===
Richard Santoro and Zylah, two artists credited with work on Kanye West's collaborative albums with Ty Dolla Sign (Vultures 1 and Vultures 2), came with West to see a Serie A match in Italy, as requested by his son Saint. Santoro encouraged West to come to the game, as he was a fan of Inter Milan. During the game, West had become "very impressed by the passion of the ultras", asking Santoro to bring him members for his own use. Though this plan initially failed, West was able to work with the ultras once he began recording in Saudi Arabia, creating a group of 200 members to record with under the guide of Federico Secondomè and guitarist Keith Richard. They recorded five songs during these sessions, which were later released on both Vultures albums.

On Vultures 1, released in February 2024, West used the ultras on the track "Stars", as well as the US Billboard Hot 100 chart-topper "Carnival". They also appeared on "Like That Remix", a remix of Metro Boomin and Future's song featuring West and Ty Dolla Sign. On Vultures 2, released in August 2024, West once again used the ultras again on two songs: "Time Moving Slow" and "Fried", with the latter drawing comparisons to "Carnival" due to its production style and usage of the ultras.

=== Second iteration ===
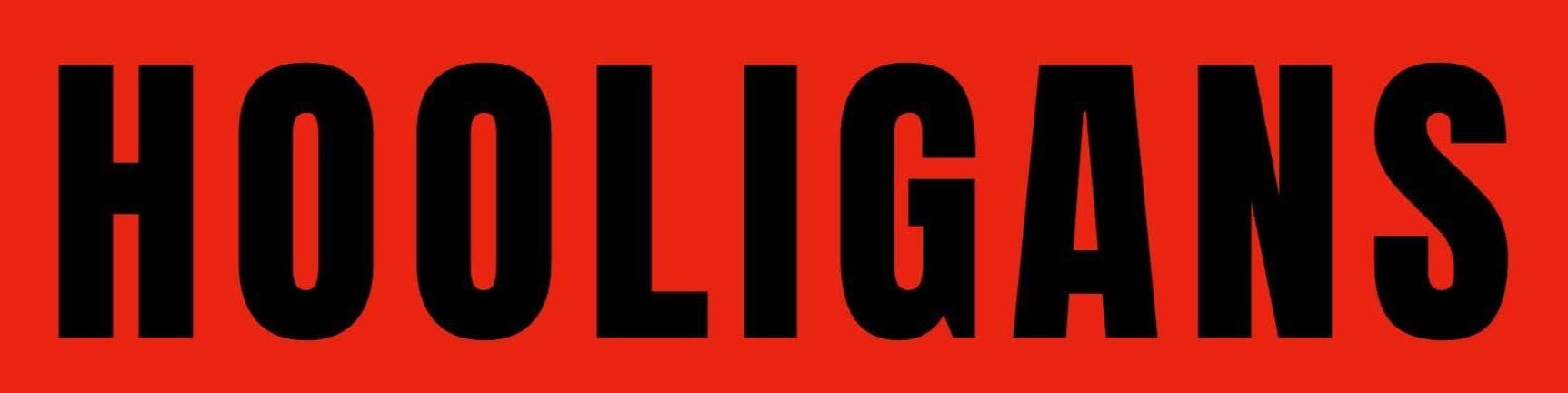
Logo used for the current iteration of the Hooligans

On March 16, 2025, West posted a casting call for the new incarnation of the Hooligans to Twitter. In his post, he laid out several rules for any "all male volunteers" interested in joining, such as disallowing fat people from applying, preferring those with the skin complexion of Sean Combs, and requiring members to be "comfortable wearing swastikas." West also posted "urgent" flyers seeking "African American males" for the choir around Los Angeles.

From March–April, West hosted tryouts for new members at his Los Angeles warehouse, which he had been using as a headquarters. During this time, West hired American musician André Troutman to be his music director, assembling the tryout group alongside him. West trained the group by having them perform to his singles "Carnival" (2024) and "Black Skinhead" (2013), causing his neighbors to complain about the noise coming from his warehouse. Allegedly, a Nazi swastika was painted on a side of the building that faced a nearby elementary school. Law enforcement officials who spoke to TMZ reported that they had received over a dozen calls in the past two months in relation to "where Kanye West is doing business for an upcoming event."

This new iteration of the group first appeared on the song "Heil Hitler", released as a single on May 8, 2025. Due to its antisemitic theming, including a sample from a Adolf Hitler speech in its outro, the song received widespread condemnation from media outlets. The main version of the track is also known as the "Hooligan Version" in reference to the group's vocals being present. After West had tweeted that he was "done" with antisemitism, he released a Christian version of the song, titled "Hallelujah", containing alternate vocals from both himself and the Hooligans. In July 2025, they contributed uncredited vocals to "Diddy Free" from King Combs's collaborative extended play (EP) with West, Never Stop.

==== Public appearances ====
The Hooligans have made several appearances since the release of "Heil Hitler", including performing the song at Sean Combs's star on the Hollywood Walk of Fame. After being asked to leave, the group were spotted inside of a Buffalo Wild Wings later the same day.
