= David Casavant =

David Casavant (born 13 July 1990, Tennessee) is an American fashion stylist, collector and consultant based in New York City.

== Background ==
Casavant was born in Tennessee. he moved to London to attend Central Saint Martins and start working in styling. He is founder of The David Casavant Archive, which loans his collection of archival men's clothing to celebrities, stylists and designers. He has most notably loaned to Kanye West, Rihanna, Kendrick Lamar, Pharrell, Kim Kardashian, Paul McCartney, Lady Gaga, Travis Scott, Lorde. He helped introduced the idea of wearing vintage Raf Simons, Helmut Lang, Dior Homme as well as newer designers Craig Green in hip hop opening a landscape of rappers to dress like modern rock stars. He perhaps single-handedly vaulted Simons’s past pieces into icon status by placing them on Kanye West, Rihanna, and other influential celebrities. Casavant has contributed to various magazines, including LOVE, Interview, and Vogue Hommes International. He is credited with helping create a shift in men's fashion by introducing high fashion vintage menswear into modern dressing and making it cool for men to wear and collect vintage as well as helping to put men's streetwear into womenswear. Casavant was partially responsible for the revival of the late-’90s/early-aughts streetwear look: the art-influenced graphic tee, the collaged jacket, the anointing of Raf Simons as the GOAT and of Helmut Lang as God. Casavant’s was the invisible hand, slowing pushing the narrative behind the scenes. He also styles the videos of visual and performance artist Jacolby Satterwhite.
