= Never Stop (EP) =

2025 extended play by King Combs

EP by King Combs
- Released: June 27, 2025
- Recorded: 2025
- Genres: Alternative hip-hop; trap
- Length: 16:13
- Label: Goodfellas
- Producers: Kanye West (also exec.); Mario Winans; Stevie J; Justin Combs

King Combs chronology
C3 (2023)	Never Stop (2025)

Singles from Never Stop
- 1. "Repeat Me" Released: August 22, 2025

Never Stop is the third extended play (EP) by the American rapper King Combs, the son of the rapper Sean "Diddy" Combs. It was released on June 27, 2025, through Goodfellas Entertainment. Executive produced by Kanye West, the EP features guest appearances from West, West's daughter North, Jasmine Williams, and the Hooligans. It follows Combs's second extended play, C3 (2023).

West and King Combs began recording Never Stop together after the former had expressed interest in attending Sean Combs's trial, although West had worked on "Diddy Free" prior to the two meeting. The EP was preceded by the promotional single "Lonely Roads", released to West's Twitter account in March 2025 and originally intended for a Sean Combs album. "Repeat Me" was later released as a single in August 2025, and a music video for "Lonely Roads" was produced the following month.

== Background and recording ==
According to King Combs, Kanye West first proposed the idea of a collaborative EP between the two after plans for West's Yeezy brand to collaborate with Sean Combs's fashion company Sean John fell through during late 2024. Initially, West's idea for the project was an EP consisting of 5 tracks instead of the 7 present on the released version. Combs later stated in an interview with Hot97 that the joint sessions between him and West were "intense in the best way," noting West's operating process as similar to that of Combs's father, Sean Combs, highlighting West's energy. The instrumental for "Lonely Roads" was created from scratch during one of these sessions before being further developed by West, with his daughter North recording for it at West's request due to her eagerness to work with them.

The track "Diddy Free" was initially conceived and written by American rapper Dave Blunts for West's scrapped studio album Cuck, which he worked on from February to June of 2025. This version leaked on May 18, 2025, after a copy of the album was bought by Discord users for US$999, the proceeds of which went to the United States Holocaust Memorial Museum. The producer Adey, who was originally an audio engineer for West's album Bully (2026), gave beats to West so he could repurpose them for other artists, and one later became the Never Stop track "Souls Outro".

On June 12, 2025, CNN reported that West and King Combs began working on music after the former had attempted to attend Sean Combs's trial. The following day, West briefly appeared at the trial to watch the day's proceedings in an overflow room, and left the courthouse 40 minutes later.

== Composition ==
The EP, encompassing alternative hip-hop and trap, contains seven tracks, the first project from West to have that amount since his collaborative project with Kid Cudi, Kids See Ghosts (credited to the group of the same name). West appears on the track "People Like Me".

=== Tracks ===
The album opens with "Lonely Roads", a song featuring West's daughter, North West, and Chicago singer Jaas. The next track, "Kim", is a tribute to King Combs's late mother, Kim Porter. "People Like Me" features a verse from West, who leans into a "villain" persona, emphasized by a sample from the 1983 film Scarface heard in the track. King Combs's verse defends his father, saying that "[my] father's a hustler, it's not my fault your dad's poor." The fourth track, "Diddy Free", advocates for Sean Combs's freedom, with the chorus repeating "niggas ain't going to sleep 'til we see Diddy free." King Combs's verse criticizes how the mainstream media views him and his family, rapping, "Like damn, why the fuck I'm in these tabloids? / If it ain't me, it's my pops or my bitch."

== Promotion and release ==
The song "Lonely Roads", originally titled "Lonely Roads Still Go to Sunshine", was released as a promotional single on March 15, 2025, on Twitter. It received negative attention from media outlets, as Sean Combs originally featured on the song alongside North, which was seen as dangerous due to the multiple sexual misconduct allegations Sean Combs is accused of. West wanted his daughter to meet Combs, and briefly feuded with ex-wife Kim Kardashian after she attempted to block the song's release on streaming services. Despite this, Never Stop, including "Lonely Roads", released onto Tidal, Apple Music, and YouTube Music on June 27, 2025. The prior night, West tweeted that a King Combs project executively produced by him was scheduled to drop at midnight. "Repeat Me" was later released as a single on August 22. A music video for "Lonely Roads", featuring cameos from King Combs's siblings, was uploaded to his YouTube channel on September 18.

The album's cover art is a photograph of Sean Combs's former Bad Boy Worldwide headquarters, located in New York City. The original photo was taken on May 25, 2020, while the building was going through renovations. A homeless person can be seen lying on a mattress near the building.

== Reception ==
Music journalist Quincy Dominic gave Never Stop a positive review on his website RatingsGameMusic, describing it as a rushed but bold statement, highlighting the production and its standout tracks. Alexander Cole of HotNewHipHop noted that "fans may find this endeavor from Ye to be a bit distasteful," emphasizing the EP's controversial themes regarding Sean Combs.

== Track listing ==
Never Stop track listing (Note: Find additional credits for "Diddy Free" on the BMI Repertoire by searching the work number #77195348.)
No.	Title	Writer(s)	Producer(s)	Length
1.	"Lonely Roads" (with North West and Kanye West featuring Jaas)	Christian Combs; Kanye West; Carlos Coleman; Justin Dior Combs; Sean Combs; North West; Jasmine Williams; Steven Jordan; Mario Winans	K. West; J. Combs; Winans; Stevie J; the Legendary Traxster^{[u]}	3:25
2.	"Kim"	C. Combs; K. West; Rai Smith	K. West; the Legendary Traxster^{[u]}	1:40
3.	"People Like Me" (featuring Kanye West)	C. Combs; K. West; Jason Harris	K. West; Che Pope^{[u]}; Prodbyjuice^{[u]}	2:21
4.	"Diddy Free"	C. Combs; K. West; Derrick Milano; Davion Blessing; James Price	K. West; the Legendary Traxster^{[u]}	2:05
5.	"Repeat Me"	C. Combs; K. West; Afolabi Rosiji; Milano; Chris Malloy Jr.	K. West	2:20
6.	"The List"	C. Combs; K. West; Rosiji	K. West; the Legendary Traxster^{[u]}	1:42
7.	"Souls Outro"	C. Combs; K. West; Rosiji	K. West; Adey^{[u]}; Olyevns^{[u]}; Hassan Khaffaf^{[u]}	2:40
Total length:				16:13

Notes

- All songs are stylized in all caps.
- "Diddy Free" features uncredited additional vocals from the Hooligans.
- ^{^[u]} indicates an uncredited producer.

Sample credits

- "People Like Me" features an excerpt from the 1983 film Scarface.
