= Thomas Connelly (dentist) =

American dentist (born c.1973)

Thomas P. Connelly (born c. 1973) is an American dentist who is known for putting diamonds into the teeth of celebrities.

== Biography ==
Born c. 1973, Connelly grew up in Detroit. He learned dentistry in Detroit, going on to move to New York City, then Boston. He resides in Beverly Hills, California. He is also a bodybuilder.

Connely operates in Beverly Hills. He is credited with being the first to insert diamonds into teeth, and was nicknamed "The Father of Diamond Dentistry" by Rolling Stone.

Between 2019 and 2021, he reconstructed the teeth of Post Malone; he placed eighteen porcelain veneers, eight platinum crowns into his teeth, and two six-carat diamonds into his canines, costing $1,600,000. In 2023, he nearly lost $600,000 worth of the diamonds while eating Chicken McNuggets.

In 2021, singer Chris Brown spent $100,000 on grills. Magnets were fitted into the grills as to not hinder speech.

In 2022, he inserted a $100,000 P-shaped diamond into the tooth of rapper Gunna. The diamond is a reference to his 2022 single "Pushin P". He has also worked on the teeth of DaBaby, Lil Yachty, Odell Beckham Jr., Offset, and Shaquille O'Neal, among others. He worked on the teeth of rapper Tyla Yaweh for free, as Connelly thought his teeth looked "terrible”.

In 2024, he placed a titanium crown over the teeth of Kanye West. In August 2024, he was accused of getting West addicted to nitrous oxide by Milo Yiannopoulos in an affidavit filed to the California Dental Board. West and his wife, Bianca Censori, planned to sue him for such in May 2025.
