= King Combs =

American rapper (born 1998)

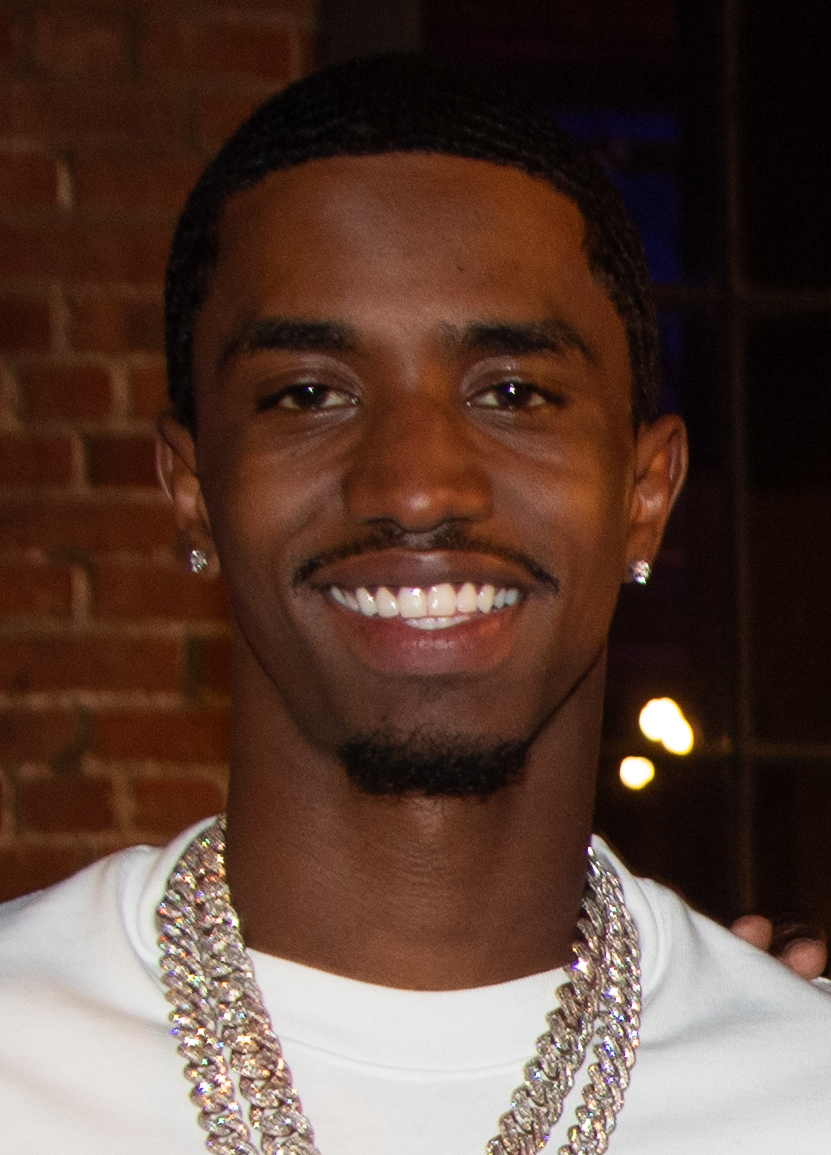
- Combs in 2023
- Born: Christian Casey Combs; April 1, 1998 (age 28); New York City, U.S.
- Occupations: Rapper; model
- Years active: 2016–present
- Parents: Sean Combs (father); Kim Porter (mother)
- Relatives: Quincy (half-brother); Justin Combs (half-brother)
- Modeling information
- Agency: IMG Models
- Musical career
- Genre: East Coast hip-hop
- Labels: Goodfellas; Bad Boy

Christian Casey "King" Combs (born April 1, 1998) is an American rapper and model. The son of rapper Sean Combs and model Kim Porter, Combs began his recording career with the release of his 2017 single "Type Different". His debut extended play, Cyncerely, C3 (2019), was released by his father's label Bad Boy Records. In the wake of his father's sexual misconduct trial, Combs released an extended play, Never Stop (2025), where Combs expressed support for him.

== Early and personal life ==
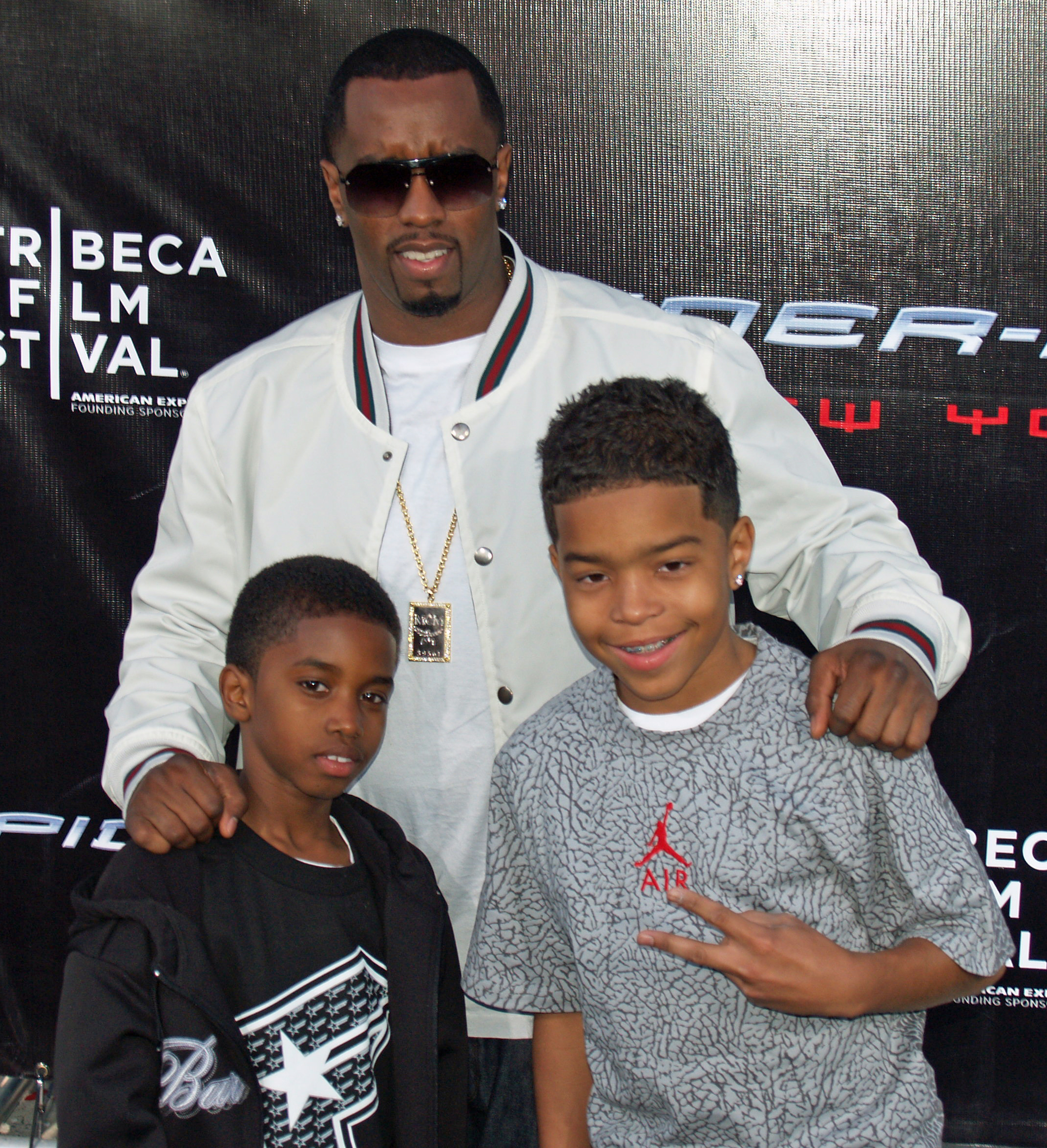
Combs (left) with his father Sean Combs and brother Justin at the Spider-Man 3 premiere, 2007

Christian Casey Combs was born on April 1, 1998, in New York City, as the first child of rapper and record producer Sean Combs and model Kim Porter. He has six siblings, including an older half-brother, Quincy. Combs has described himself as having a close relationship with his father, having shown support during his sexual assault trial, and having issued a joint statement of support along with five of his siblings in October 2024. In November of that year, Combs announced he would be taking control of his father's Instagram account in order to highlight his accomplishments. Following the verdict of his father's criminal trial, where he was acquitted of racketeering and sex trafficking, Combs expressed relief, commenting that he would "hug [his] pops".

== Career ==
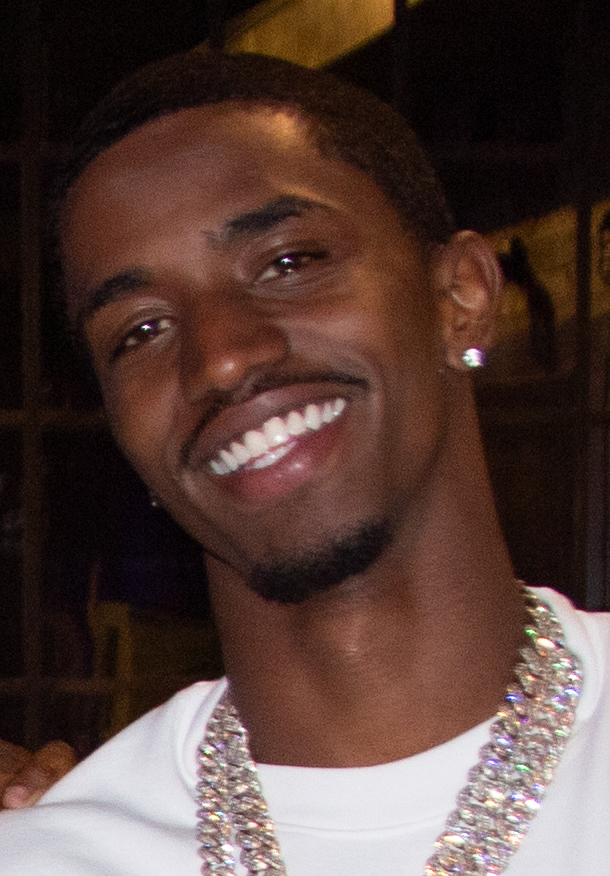
Combs in July 2023

Combs told People in 2022 that he always wanted to be a rapper like his father, Sean Combs. Combs said in 2019 that his mother, Kim Porter, encouraged him to pursue music. Combs signed with his father's record label Bad Boy Records in 2016. In 2018, Combs released his debut mixtape, 90's Baby, on SoundCloud. Combs released his 9-track EP Cyncerely, C3 on March 29, 2019.

In 2022, Combs achieved his first number 1 single on Mediabase's Urban Radio chart with his song "Can't Stop Won't Stop", featuring Kodak Black. At the BET Awards 2023, Combs was nominated for "Best Collaboration" for the song. On July 14, 2023, Combs released his second EP, C3. Following the highly publicized controversies sparked by Diddy's 2023 and 2024 accusations, he released the song "Pick a Side" addressing the criticism from fans, the Homeland security’s raid on the family’s property, and even targets rapper 50 Cent: “I dare one of you niggas scream out ‘no diddy’ / Police raid the crib like they think we selling crack, but we out here selling tracks / Multimillion dollar plaques,” Combs raps. On June 27, 2025, Combs released a surprise extended play called Never Stop, which included the song "Lonely Roads", a song Kanye West previewed in March 2025. The album includes a song called "Diddy Free", referencing Combs's father. The song was initially intended to be on West's album In a Perfect World, though it was eventually released as a single. In September 2025, Combs released the music video for "Lonely Roads".

In addition to rapping, Combs is also a fashion model. Combs is signed to IMG Models, first signing in 2018 for worldwide representation, and re-signing in 2023. Combs represented fashion brand Dolce & Gabbana, becoming the face of the brand's 2018 Spring campaign. In 2020, Combs collaborated with Rihanna for a Savage X Fenty men's wear collection.

== Legal issues ==
In April 2024, Combs was accused of sexual assault in a lawsuit that also named his father. The lawsuit alleged that in December 2022, while on vacation, Combs pressured a woman working as a stewardess on his father's yacht to drink tequila and later assaulted her by attempting to force her to give him oral sex. The woman also claimed that his father paid off the ship's crew to remain silent about the incident. An attorney for Combs, Aaron Dyer, claimed the lawsuit contained "manufactured lies and irrelevant facts".

== Discography ==
=== Extended plays ===
List of extended plays, with selected details
Title	Details	Ref.
Cyncerely, C3	Released: March 29, 2019; Label: Bad Boy, Empire Distribution	
C3	Released: July 14, 2023; Label: Bad Boy	
Never Stop	Released: June 27, 2025; Label: Goodfellas Entertainment	

=== Mixtapes ===
List of mixtapes, with selected details
Title	Details	Ref.
90's Baby	Released: April 11, 2018; Label: Self-released	

=== Singles ===
As lead artist

Title	Year	Album/EP	Ref.
"Type Different" (feat. Bay Swag & Lajan Slim)	2017	Non-album single	
"F*ck the Summer Up"	2017	Non-album single	
"Feeling Savage" (feat. Smooky MarGielaa)	2017	Non-album single	
"Love You Better" (feat. Chris Brown)	2018	Non-album single	
"Naughty" (feat. Jeremih)	2019	Cyncerely, C3	
"Legacy"	2020	Non-album single	
"Cartis"	2020	Non-album single	
"Holdin Me Down" (feat. Future)	2021	Non-album single	
"A Dream"	2021	Non-album single	
"Gas You Up" (feat. DreamDoll)	2022	Non-album single	
"Can't Stop Won't Stop" (feat. Kodak Black)	2022	Non-album single	
"Bent"	2023	Non-album single	
"Deep End"	2024	Non-album single	
"You Ready (Fuck You Better)" (with Cash Cobain)	2024	Non-album single	
"One More Prayer"	2025	Non-album single	
"Lonely Roads" (with North West and Kanye West featuring Jasmine Williams)	2025	Never Stop	

As featured artist

Title	Year	Artist	Album	Ref.
"The West"	2018	Kai Ca$h	Non-album single	
"How You Want It?"	2019	Teyana Taylor	The Album	
"Diana"	2020	Pop Smoke	Shoot for the Stars, Aim for the Moon	
"Every Pretty Girl in the City" (remix)	2022	WanMor	Non-album single	
