= The David Casavant Archive =

The David Casavant Archive is a private clothing collection belonging to stylist David Casavant, based in New York City and founded in 2014. The Archive houses a substantial collection of vintage men's clothing, with a focus on pieces by designers such as Raf Simons and Helmut Lang. It is primarily used forr editorial work, lending garments to celebrities, designers, and stylists. Its clients have included Kanye West, Rihanna, Paul McCartney, Travis Scott, Lorde, Big Sean, Young Thug, Pharrell, Kendrick Lamar, and Kim Kardashian. Two vintage Helmut Lang denim jackets from the Archive were featured in the music video for the song 'FourFiveSeconds' by Rihanna, Kanye West, and Paul McCartney.
