= North West (musician) =

American singer and rapper (born 2013)

- Born: June 15, 2013 (age 13); Los Angeles, California, U.S.
- Occupations: Rapper; singer; record producer
- Years active: 2024–present
- Label: Gamma
- Parents: Kanye West (father); Kim Kardashian (mother)
- Family: Kardashian family

North West (born June 15, 2013) is an American rapper, singer and record producer. She is the eldest child of rapper Kanye West and media personality Kim Kardashian. West appeared in the music video for her father's 2014 single "Only One", and made several appearances on Keeping Up with the Kardashians along with her mother.

As a child actress, West made her film debut as the voice of Mini in Paw Patrol: The Mighty Movie in 2023. In 2024, she performed "I Just Can't Wait to Be King" at the Hollywood Bowl's The Lion King 30th Anniversary – A Live-to-Film Concert Event. In February of that year, she made her recording debut on ¥$'s single "Talking / Once Again", which peaked at number 30 on the Billboard Hot 100. She also appeared on the duo's 2024 song "Bomb" alongside her sister Chicago, as well as FKA Twigs's "Childlike Things", where she performed in Japanese on both songs. In 2026, she released her debut EP N0rth4evr.

== Early life ==
North West was born on June 15, 2013, at Cedars-Sinai Medical Center in Los Angeles, California, to Kanye West and Kim Kardashian. At the moment, Kanye was DJing, and North was born while "Bohemian Rhapsody" by Queen was played. North's maternal aunts and uncle are Kourtney Kardashian, Khloé Kardashian, and Rob Kardashian, and her maternal half-aunts are Kendall and Kylie Jenner. West's parents became engaged in October 2013, married in May 2014, separated in February 2021, and divorced in 2022, by which time North had two younger brothers and a younger sister. West's due date was July 12, 2013, which would have been the 64th birthday of Kanye's mother Donda West, and her early delivery meant she spent time in an incubator.

CBS News described her and Prince George of Wales as the two most famous babies in the world. Kim told GQ that she and Kanye picked the name North after it was recommended by Pharrell Williams and Anna Wintour. In January 2020, she used a video uploaded to Kylie's YouTube account to state that the name North grew on her after Jay Leno jokingly suggested it while she was appearing on his talk show.

West was baptised in the Armenian Apostolic Church at the Cathedral of Saint James in Jerusalem in April 2015 during a tour of the Middle East, and attended Sierra Canyon School, which had previously been attended by Kendall and Kylie. Growing up, she was involved in a number of her parents' ventures. In January 2015, she appeared in the music video for Kanye's "Only One". In April 2016, Kardashian used an episode of her sister's chat show Kocktails with Khloé to note that North had flushed an iPhone containing an early draft of Kanye's album The Life of Pablo down the toilet, leading Kanye to have to re-record it from scratch.

She made appearances on her family's program Keeping Up with the Kardashians. Aged five, she appeared on the cover of Women's Wear Daily's annual Beauty Inc. issue. In March 2023, Kim applied for several trademarks in North's name. In September 2023, North, Saint, and Kim voiced Mini, Meteor Max, and Delores in Paw Patrol: The Mighty Movie. In October 2023, by which time she had accompanied her mother to multiple events in Los Angeles and abroad, she gave a solo interview to i-D, in which she expressed several of her hopes and dreams.

== Career ==
=== 2024: Vultures collaborations and The Lion King performance ===
By February 2024, a TikTok account North shared with her mother had accrued 18.3 million followers. That month, Kanye West released a video for "Talking / Once Again", a single by ¥$, a supergroup comprising himself and Ty Dolla Sign, which included a guest verse from North; upon release later that month as part of the group's album Vultures 1, North's contribution was noted by NME as a rare highlight from an otherwise relentlessly misogynistic album. Later that month, the song peaked at number 30 on the Billboard Hot 100, and she performed it at Accor Arena.

On March 10, West announced her debut album Elementary School Dropout, at a performance in Arizona plugging ¥$'s second album Vultures 2; the title referenced Kanye's 2004 album The College Dropout. She then gave an interview to the then-thirteen-year-old Jazlyn of Jazzy's World TV at Rolling Loud. In April 2024, ¥$ uploaded a second music video for "Talking", which had been co-directed and written by North, and featured scenes of her with Kanye and with a group of people her own age.

"I already know what's coming, you know, that she's not Whitney Houston — duh! Oh, she got the job cause of her parents. North is the moment. They want to see North West on a TikTok, on this, on anything, because she's a personality, a performer, and if anyone wants to hate on a child that is having the time of their lives, fuck you."

— Kim Kardashian just before North's performance

In May 2024, it was announced that she would perform at the Hollywood Bowl's The Lion King 30th Anniversary – A Live-to-Film Concert Event later that month. Deadline Hollywood drew parallels with the then-recent announcement that Blue Ivy Carter, a daughter of Beyoncé and Jay-Z, had been hired for a role in Mufasa: The Lion King. For her performance of "I Just Can't Wait to Be King", West was outfitted by ERL Clothing, who put her in a yellow furry hooded sweatshirt with matching shorts, socks and furry slippers. Her performance was praised by Jason Weaver, who provided the singing voice for that film's cub Simba; however, some social media commentators felt that West had only been hired due to her parents' fame. Her role was later defended by Kim on an episode of The Kardashians. In August 2024, North and her sister Chicago were featured on the track "Bomb" from ¥$'s album Vultures 2, in which North rapped in Japanese. That October, she was interviewed by Interview, where she discussed Christianity and Japan.

=== 2025–present: Collaborations and N0rth4evr ===
West contributed a rap in Japanese to "Childlike Things" from FKA Twigs's January 2025 album Eusexua. In a March 2025 video uploaded to Instagram, Twigs stated that she was inspired to include a child on the track as it used lyrics she had written when she was 12 or 13 and that she was specifically inspired to feature West after being struck by the confidence she exuded during an interview, having herself been very shy at that age. She also released a video for the track that month.

In March 2025, she featured on "Lonely Roads Still Go to Sunshine", a track Kanye uploaded to Twitter that featured Jasmine Williams, King Combs, and the latter's father Sean Combs; the involvement of the last of these prompted Justin Curto of Vulture to describe the track as "one of the most problematic songs you could imagine", as Diddy had been imprisoned on federal sex-crime charges. Caitlin Moran of The Times described the collaboration as "in no way a useful career step for her" and criticised Kanye for using it to "continue his demented psychological warfare against his ex-wife — at the expense of their child". Prior to release, Kanye shared screenshots he claimed were between himself and Kim, which claimed that she had requested that North's trademark be signed over to her so she could block North's participation "to protect her"; he later deleted both posts. Playboi Carti subsequently expressed interest in working with North and "Lonely Roads Still Go to Sunshine" later featured on King's extended play (EP), Never Stop under the shortened title "Lonely Roads".

In January 2026, West received her first production credit by producing rapper Mag!c's track "Justswagup" with a guest feature from Lil Novi, Lil Wayne's son. She also produced "Blink Twice" from Skaiwater's album Wonderful (2026) the following month. West previewed her first solo single at Kanye's Mexico City performance on January 30, titled "Piercing on My Hand". It was released through media company Gamma on February 5, which also signed Kanye in time for his album Bully. West would also perform the song alongside "Talking" with Kanye during the latter's two SoFi Stadium performances on April 1 and 3. She released her debut EP, N0rth4evr, on May 1, 2026, through Gamma. On the same day of its release, she was featured on "So Let's Have Some Fun" from Edward Skeletrix's album Body of Work (2026). She was scheduled to embark on her co-headlining tour the Kimokawaii Tour with Molly Santana in August 2026, though the tour was ultimately cancelled for unknown reasons.

== Discography ==
=== Extended plays ===
List of EPs, with selected details
Title	EP details
N0rth4evr	Released: May 1, 2026; Label: Gamma

=== Singles ===
Title	Year	Peak chart positions				Album
Title	Year	US	UK Indie	CAN	NZ	Album
"Talking / Once Again" (¥$ featuring North West)	2024	30	14	30	32	Vultures 1
"Childlike Things" (FKA Twigs and North West)	2025	— (Note: "Childlike Things" did not enter the Billboard Hot 100, but peaked at six on the Hot Dance/Pop Songs chart.)	—	—	— (Note: "Childlike Things" did not enter the NZ Top 40 Singles chart, but peaked at 19 on the NZ Hot Singles Chart.)	Eusexua
"Piercing on My Hand"	2026	—	—	—	—	Non-album single
"#N0rth4evr"	2026	—	—	—	—	N0rth4evr
"Mula tha Root of All Evil" (Lil Novi and North West)	2026	—	—	—	—	Non-album singles
"Legacy" (Pixy and North West)	2026	—	—	—	—	Non-album singles
"—" denotes a recording that did not chart or was not released in that territory.

=== Guest appearances ===
Title	Year	Other performer(s)	Album/EP
"Bomb"	2024	¥$, Chicago West	Vultures 2 (Note: West is not credited on the album version.)
"Lonely Roads"	2025	Kanye West, (Note: Only featured on the promotional version of the song.) Jasmine Williams, King Combs, Sean Combs	Never Stop
"So Let's Have Some Fun"	2026	Edward Skeletrix	Body of Work

=== Production ===
Title	Year	Performer(s)
"Justswagup"	2026	Mag!c (featuring Lil Novi)
"Not Just a Era"	2026	Mag!c
"Redglasses"	2026	Mag!c (featuring Lil Novi)
"Blink Twice"	2026	Skaiwater
"GoinWest"	2026	Babygoth
"Mula tha Root of All Evil"	2026	Lil Novi (featuring North West)

== Filmography ==
=== Film ===
Year	Title	Role	Notes	Ref.
2023	Paw Patrol: The Mighty Movie	Mini	Voice	

=== Television ===
Year	Title	Role	Notes	Ref.
2013–17	Keeping Up with the Kardashians	Herself	17 episodes	
2019	The Ellen DeGeneres Show	Herself	Episode: "Kris Jenner"	
2022–25	The Kardashians	Herself	13 episodes	
2025	The Lion King at the Hollywood Bowl	Performer	Concert TV special	

=== Music videos ===
Year	Song	Credited as			Role	Notes	Ref.
Year	Song	Director	Writer	Actress	Role	Notes	Ref.
2015	"Only One"	No	No	Yes	Herself		
2019	"Closed on Sunday"	No	No	Yes	Herself		
2024	"Talking / Once Again"	Yes	Yes	Yes	Performer	Co-directed with Aus Taylor	
2025	"Childlike Things"	No	No	Yes	Performer		
2026	"#N0rth4evr"	No	No	Yes	Performer		
