= Justin Combs =

American actor (born 1993)

Justin Dior Combs
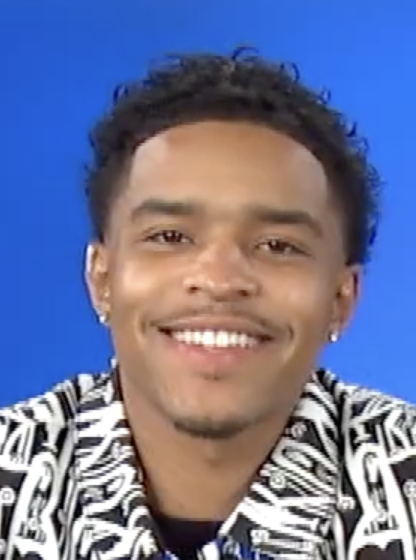
- Combs in 2020
- Born: Justin Dior Combs; December 30, 1993 (age 32); New York City, US
- Occupation: Actor
- Parents: Sean Combs (father); Misa Hylton (mother)
- Relatives: King Combs (half-brother); Quincy (stepbrother)

Justin Dior Combs (born December 30, 1993) is an American actor. He is the son of rapper Sean Combs and model Misa Hylton.

== Personal life ==
Justin Combs was born on December 30, 1993, Mount Vernon, New York, to rapper Sean Combs and fashion designer Misa Hylton. He attended Iona Preparatory School in New Rochelle, New York, where he played football and received a 3.75 GPA. In 2012, Combs got a scholarship worth $54,000 for the University of California, Los Angeles (UCLA), before graduating with a degree in sociology in 2016.

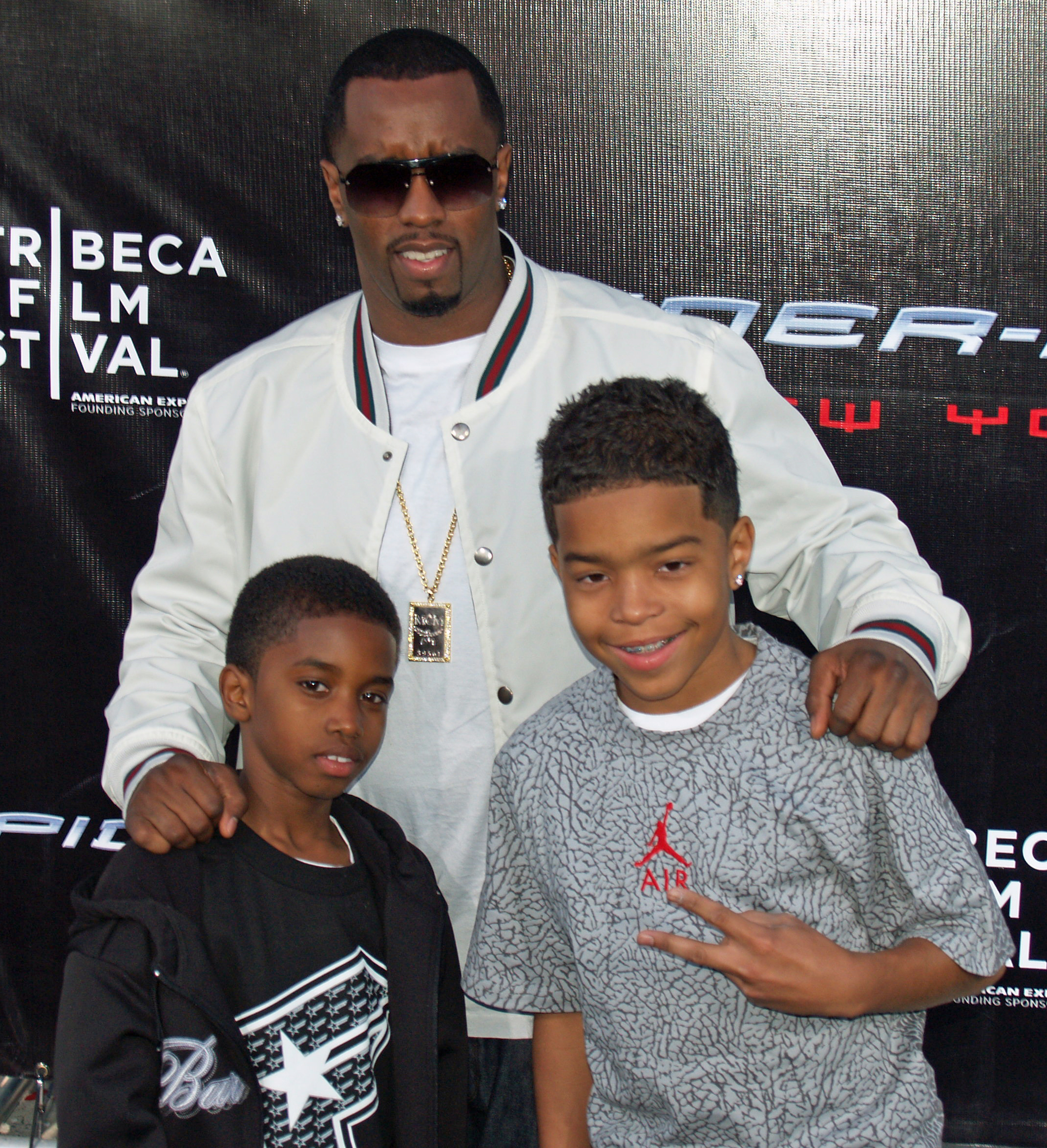
Christian Combs (left) with his father Sean Combs (middle) and Justin Combs (right) at the Spider-Man 3 premiere, 2007

Other than Quincy being his stepbrother and King Combs being his half-brother, he also has half sisters on his father's side by the names of Jessie James, D'Lila Star, Chance and Love Sean. While on his mother's side his half-brother is Niko Brim and his half-sister is Madison Star Brim.

== Career ==
Combs has starred in television, appearing during a season three episode of Power Book II: Ghost and hosted the 2021 TV series, "Respectfully Justin".

== Filmography ==
=== Television ===
| Year | Title | Role | Notes |
|---|---|---|---|
| 2019 | Catfish: The TV Show | Guest star as himself | Season 7, Episode:37 "CJ & Shana" |
| 2019 | Catfish: The TV Show | Guest star as himself | Season 7, Episode:39 "Cherie & Avion" |
| 2021 | Power Book II: Ghost | Unknown | Season 3, Episode: "Unknown" |
| 2021–present | Respectfully Justin: Talk Show | Guest star as himself | Every Season |

== Legal issues ==
In 2023, Combs was arrested on a charge of DUI and subsequently accepted a plea deal that allowed him to avoid jail time.

== See also ==
- Endrick Sousa
- Romeo Miller
- Bow Wow
- Chris Brown
