= Kanye West =

American rapper and producer (born 1977)

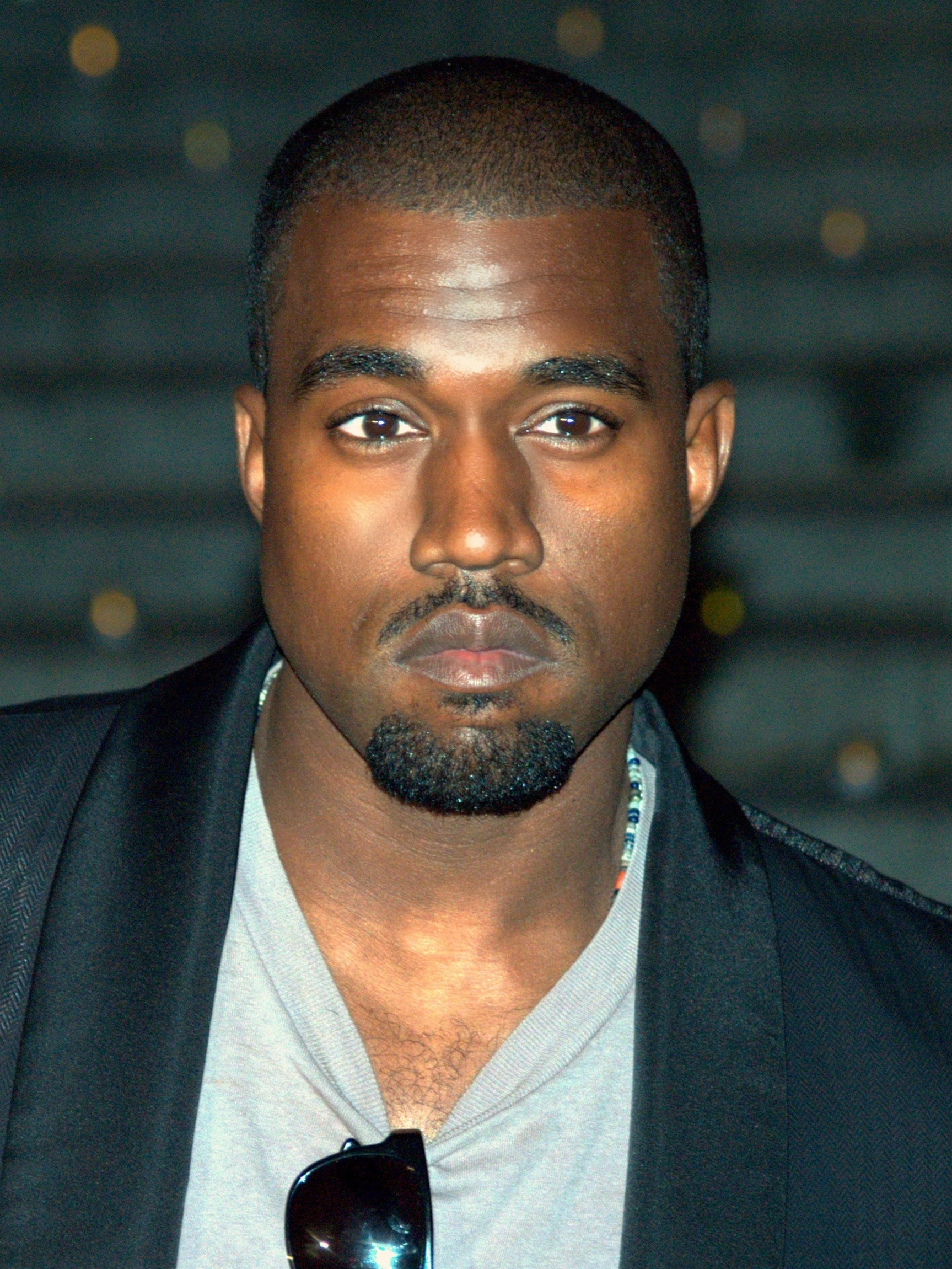
- West in 2009
- Born: Kanye Omari West; June 8, 1977 (age 49); Atlanta, Georgia, U.S.
- Other names: Ye (Note: Ye has been his legal name since October 2021. Despite this, sources still most commonly refer to him as Kanye West.); Yeezy; Kon the Louis Vuitton Don
- Occupations: Rapper; record producer; singer; songwriter; fashion designer; businessman
- Years active: 1993–present
- Organizations: Donda; Yeezy
- Spouses: Kim Kardashian (m. 2014; div. 2022) Bianca Censori (m. 2022) (Note: West and Censori were married in a private ceremony in December 2022. Censori has since been referred to as West's wife by media publications, as well as West himself.)
- Children: 4, including North
- Mother: Donda West
- Relatives: Devo Harris (cousin); Tony Williams (cousin)
- Awards: Full list
- Musical career
- Origin: Chicago, Illinois
- Genres: Hip-hop; pop; electronic; soul
- Works: Albums; singles; songs; production; unreleased
- Labels: Roc-A-Fella; Def Jam; Mercury; GOOD; YZY; Gamma
- Member of: Sunday Service Choir; Hooligans; ¥$
- Formerly of: Go-Getters; Child Rebel Soldier; the Hitmen; Kids See Ghosts
- Website: yeezy.com

Ye (/jeɪ/ YAY; born Kanye Omari West /ˈkɑːnjeɪ oʊˈmɑːri/ KAHN-yay oh-MAH-ree, June 8, 1977) is an American rapper, songwriter, and record producer. He has been listed among the greatest rappers of all time and referred to as one of the most prominent figures in hip-hop. His music, characterized by frequent stylistic shifts, has been credited with facilitating the emergence of rappers who did not conform to gangsta rap conventions. He is also known for his controversial public persona, including his polarizing cultural and political commentary.

West was born in Atlanta and raised in Chicago. After dropping out of college to pursue a music career, he became a producer for Jay-Z's Roc-A-Fella Records and garnered recognition for his "chipmunk soul" production style before signing with the label as a recording artist. His first two studio albums, The College Dropout (2004) and Late Registration (2005), received critical acclaim; the latter became his first of eleven US Billboard 200 number-one albums. Both projects, as well as Graduation (2007), 808s & Heartbreak (2008), My Beautiful Dark Twisted Fantasy (2010), and Yeezus (2013), ranked among Rolling Stone's "500 Greatest Albums of All Time". West has five US Billboard Hot 100 number-one singles―"Slow Jamz" (2003), "Gold Digger" (2005), "Stronger" (2007), "E.T." (2011, as a featured artist), and "Carnival" (2024)―and was the first rapper to top the chart across three decades.

West's life has been the subject of significant media coverage. He has been a frequent source of controversy due to his conduct on social media, at award shows, and in public settings, as well as his comments on the music and fashion industries, U.S. politics, race, and slavery. His Christian faith, relationships, feuds with other celebrities, and mental health have also been topics of media attention. From 2014 to 2022, he was married to Kim Kardashian, with whom he has four children. In 2020, West ran an unsuccessful independent presidential campaign. From 2022 to 2025, West drew widespread condemnation—and lost sponsors and partnerships—for expressing antisemitic views and support for Nazism; he praised Adolf Hitler, used swastika imagery, and denied the Holocaust.

West is one of the best-selling music artists, with 160 million records sold. He has 24 Grammy Awards, making him one of the most awarded artists at the award show. Time named him one of the 100 most influential people in the world in 2005 and 2015. Rolling Stone also named him one of the "100 Greatest Songwriters of All Time". Beyond his musical career, he has collaborated with Nike, Louis Vuitton, and Gap Inc. on clothing and footwear, and led the Yeezy collaboration with Adidas.

== Early life ==
Kanye Omari West was born on June 8, 1977, in Atlanta, Georgia. (Note: Most biographies and reference works state that West was born in Atlanta, although some sources give his birthplace as Douglasville, a small city west of Atlanta.) After his parents divorced when he was three years old, he moved with his mother to Chicago, Illinois. His father, Ray West, is a former Black Panther and was one of the first black photojournalists at The Atlanta Journal-Constitution. Ray later became a Christian counselor, and in 2006, opened the Good Water Store and Café in Lexington Park, Maryland, with startup capital from his son. West's mother, Donda C. West (née Williams), was an English professor at Clark Atlanta University and the Chair of the English Department at Chicago State University before retiring to serve as his manager.

West was raised in a middle-class environment, attending Polaris School for Individual Education in suburban Oak Lawn, Illinois, after living in Chicago. At the age of 10, West moved with his mother to Nanjing, China, where she was teaching at Nanjing University as a Fulbright Scholar. According to his mother, West was the only foreigner in his class, but he settled in well and quickly picked up the language, although he has since forgotten most of it. When asked about his grades in high school, West replied, "I got A's and B's."

West demonstrated an affinity for the arts at an early age; he began writing poetry when he was five years old. West started rapping in the third grade and began making musical compositions in the seventh grade, eventually selling them to other artists. West crossed paths with producer No I.D., who became West's friend and mentor. After graduating from high school, West received a scholarship to attend Chicago's American Academy of Art in 1997 and began taking painting classes. Shortly after, he transferred to Chicago State University to study English. At age 20, he dropped out to pursue his musical career. This disappointed his mother, who was also a professor at the university, although she would later accept the decision.

== Musical career ==
=== 1996–2002: Early work and Roc-A-Fella ===
West began his early production career in the mid-1990s, creating beats primarily for burgeoning local artists in the Chicago area. He received his first official production credits at age nineteen, when he produced eight tracks on Down to Earth, the 1996 debut album of Chicago-based underground rapper Grav. In 1998, West was the first producer signed to the management-production company Hip Hop Since 1978, founded by Gee Roberson and Kyambo "Hip-Hop" Joshua. For a time, West acted as a ghost producer for Deric "D-Dot" Angelettie. Due to his association with Angelettie, West was not able to release a solo album. This led to him forming the Go-Getters, a hip-hop group composed of him and fellow Chicago natives GLC, Timmy G, and Arrowstar. The Go-Getters independently released their first and only studio album, World Record Holders, in 1999, through West's company, Konman Productions. West spent much of the late 1990s further producing for several musical acts. He produced "My Life" on Foxy Brown's second studio album Chyna Doll (1999), which became the second hip-hop album by a female rapper to peak atop the US Billboard 200 chart.

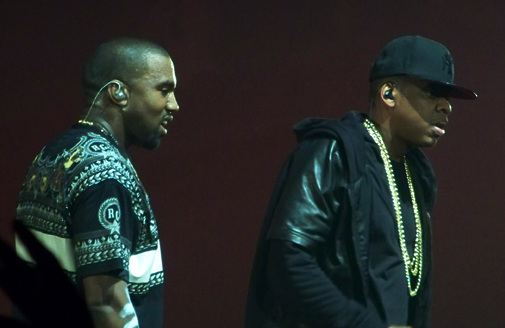
West received early acclaim for his production work on Jay-Z's The Blueprint. The two are pictured here in 2011.

In 2000, West began producing for artists on Roc-A-Fella Records as an in-house producer. West is often credited with revitalizing Jay-Z's career with extensive contributions to his 2001 album The Blueprint, which Rolling Stone ranked among their list of greatest hip-hop albums. West produced songs for label cohorts such as Beanie Sigel and Freeway, but also produced beats which were used by artists on other labels including Ludacris, Alicia Keys, and Janet Jackson. Meanwhile, West struggled to attain a record deal as a rapper. Multiple record companies, including Capitol Records, denied or ignored him because he did not portray the gangsta image prominent in mainstream hip-hop at the time. Desperate to keep West from defecting to another label, then-label head Damon Dash reluctantly signed West to Roc-A-Fella as a recording artist.

After a 2002 car accident shattered his jaw, West was inspired; two weeks after being admitted to the hospital, he recorded "Through the Wire" at the Record Plant Studios with his jaw still wired shut. The song was first included on West's debut mixtape Get Well Soon, which was released in December 2002. At the same time, West announced that he was working on an album titled The College Dropout, whose overall theme was to "make your own decisions. Don't let society tell you, 'This is what you have to do.'"

=== 2003–2006: The College Dropout and Late Registration ===
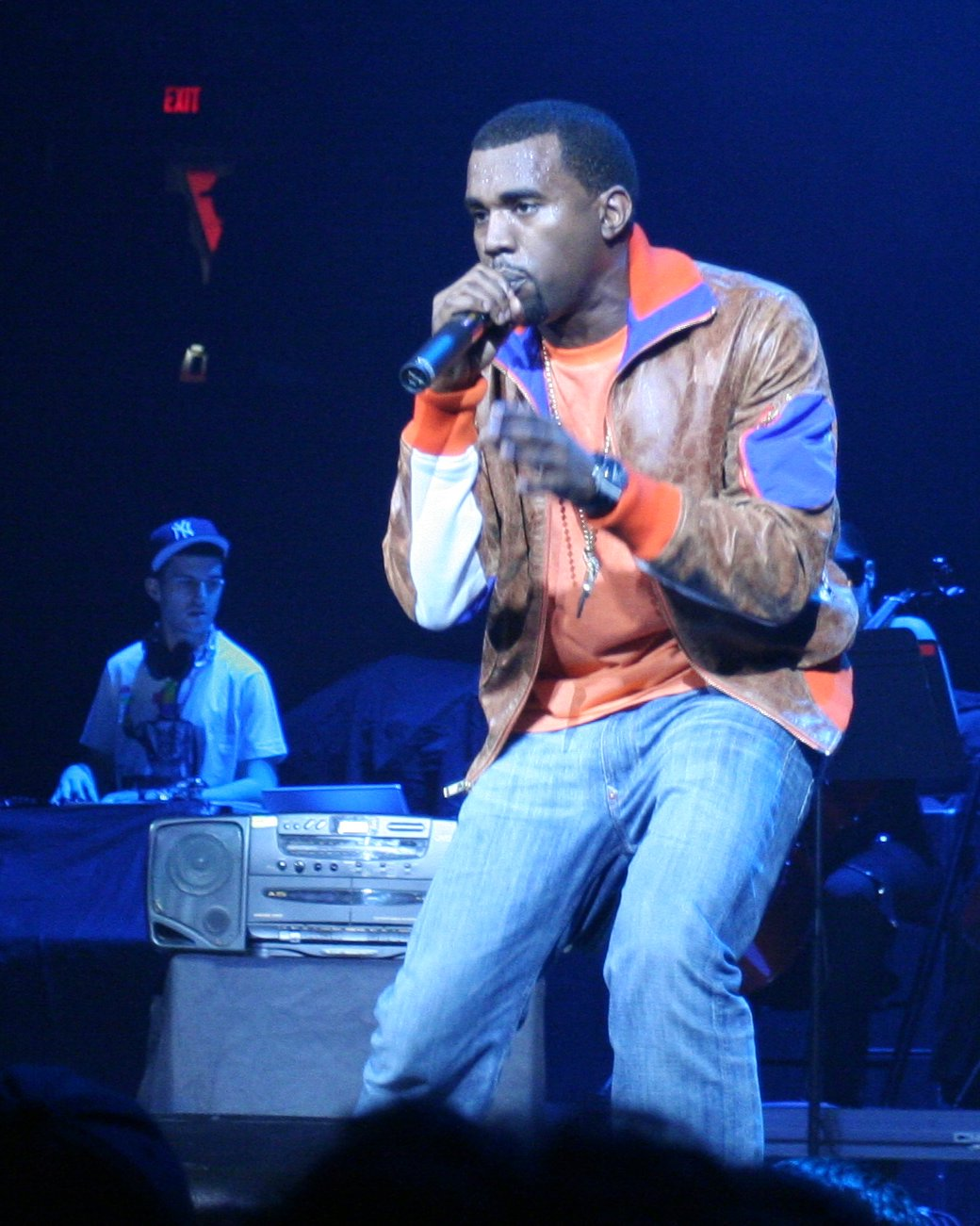
West in Portland in December 2005 as a supporting act for U2 on their Vertigo Tour

West recorded the remainder of The College Dropout in Los Angeles while recovering from the car accident. It was leaked months before its release date, and West used the opportunity to remix, remaster, and revise the album before its release; West added new verses, string arrangements, gospel choirs, and improved drum programming. The album was postponed three times from its initial date in August 2003, and was eventually released in February 2004, reaching No. 2 on the Billboard 200 as his debut single, "Through the Wire" peaked at No. 15 while on the Billboard Hot 100 chart for five weeks. "Slow Jamz", his second single, featuring Twista and Jamie Foxx, became the three musicians' first No. 1 hit. The College Dropout received critical acclaim, was nominated for the top album of the year by American Music Awards and Billboard, and has consistently been ranked among the great hip-hop works and debut albums by artists.

"Jesus Walks", the album's fourth single, reached the top 20 of the Billboard pop charts, despite industry executives' predictions that a song containing such blatant declarations of faith would never make it to the radio. The College Dropout was certified triple platinum in the U.S., and garnered West 10 Grammy nominations, including Album of the Year, and Best Rap Album (which it received). During this period, West founded GOOD Music, a record label and management company that housed affiliate artists and producers, such as No I.D. and John Legend, and produced singles for Brandy, Common, Legend, and Slum Village.

West invested $2 million and took over a year to make his second album. West was inspired by Roseland NYC Live, a 1998 live album by English trip hop group Portishead, produced with the New York Philharmonic Orchestra, incorporating string arrangements into his hip-hop production. Though West had not been able to afford many live instruments around the time of his debut album, the money from his commercial success enabled him to hire a string orchestra for his second album Late Registration. West collaborated with American film score composer Jon Brion, who served as the album's co-executive producer for several tracks. Late Registration sold over 2.3 million units in the United States alone by the end of 2005 and was considered by industry observers as the only successful major album release of the fall season, which had been plagued by steadily declining CD sales.

When his song "Touch the Sky" failed to win Best Video at the 2006 MTV Europe Music Awards, West went onto the stage as the award was being presented to Justice and Simian for "We Are Your Friends" and argued that he should have won the award instead. Hundreds of news outlets worldwide criticized the outburst. On November 7, 2006, West apologized for this outburst publicly during his performance as support act for U2 for their Vertigo concert in Brisbane. He later spoofed the incident on the 33rd-season premiere of Saturday Night Live in September 2007.

=== 2007–2009: Graduation, 808s & Heartbreak, and VMAs incident ===
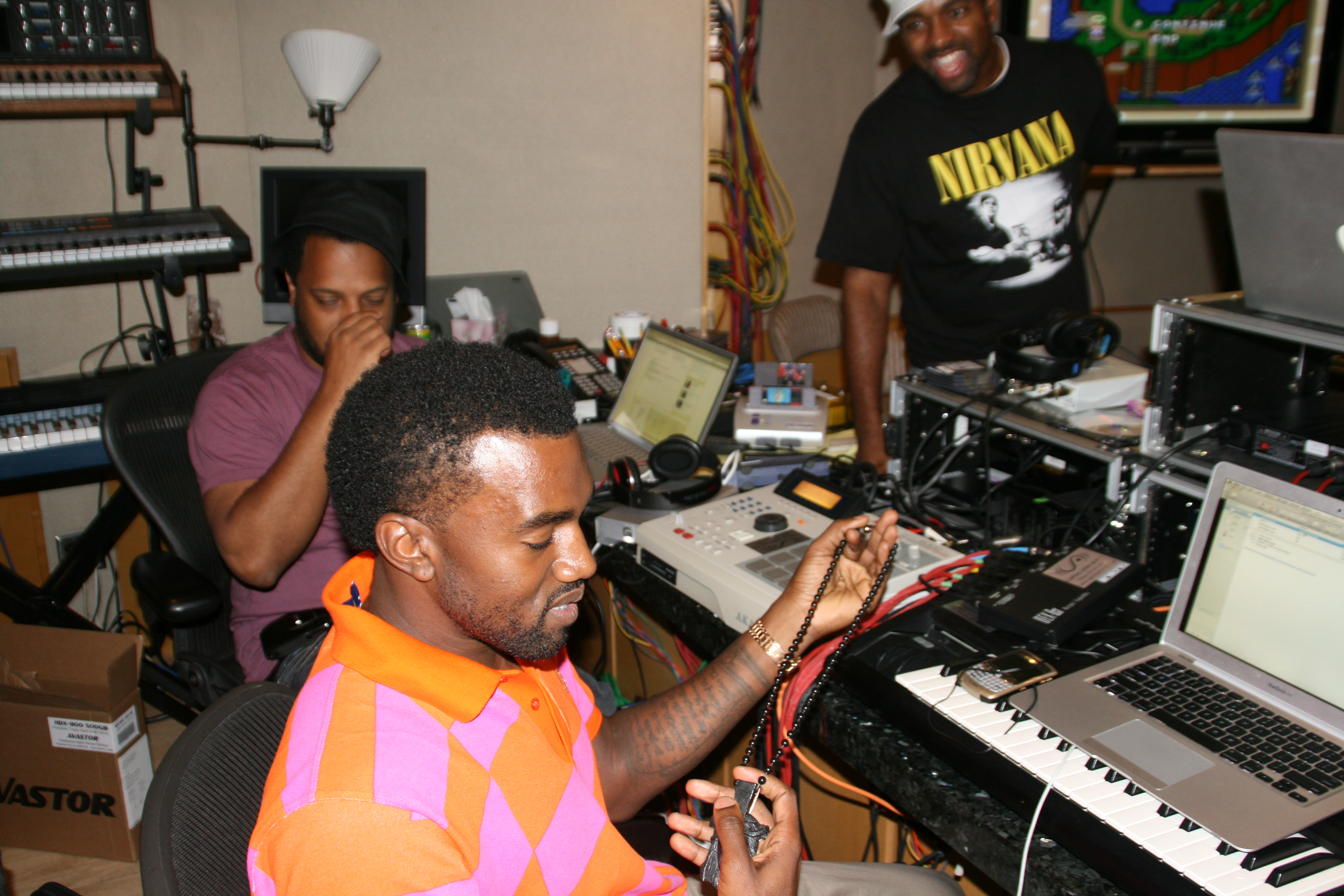
West (center) working on 808s & Heartbreak with producer and former mentor No I.D. (left) in October 2008

West's third studio album, Graduation, was released in September 2007. The album debuted at number one on the U.S. Billboard 200 chart and selling 957,000 copies in its first week. Graduation continued the string of critical and commercial successes by West, and the album's lead single, "Stronger", garnered his third number-one hit. "Stronger", which samples French house duo Daft Punk, has been accredited to not only encouraging other hip-hop artists to incorporate house and electronica elements into their music, but also for playing a part in the revival of disco and electro-infused music in the late 2000s. His mother's death in November 2007 and the end of his engagement to Alexis Phifer profoundly affected West, who set off for his 2008 Glow in the Dark Tour shortly thereafter.

Recorded mostly in Honolulu, Hawaii in three weeks, West announced his fourth album, 808s & Heartbreak, at the 2008 MTV Video Music Awards, where he performed its lead single, "Love Lockdown". Music audiences were taken aback by the uncharacteristic production style and the presence of AutoTune, which typified the pre-release response to the record. 808s & Heartbreak was released by Island Def Jam in November 2008. Upon its release, the lead single "Love Lockdown" debuted at number three on the Billboard Hot 100, while follow-up single "Heartless" debuted at number four. While it was criticized prior to release, 808s & Heartbreak is considered to have had a significant effect on hip-hop music, encouraging other rappers to take more creative risks with their productions.

While Taylor Swift was accepting her award for Best Female Video at the 2009 MTV Video Music Awards, West went on stage and grabbed the microphone from her to proclaim that Beyoncé deserved the award instead. He was subsequently removed from the remainder of the show for his actions. West was criticized by various celebrities for the outburst, and by President Barack Obama, who called West a "jackass". The incident sparked a large influx of Internet photo memes. West subsequently apologized, including personally to Swift. However, in a November 2010 interview, he seemed to recant his past apologies, describing the act at the 2009 awards show as "selfless".

=== 2010–2012: My Beautiful Dark Twisted Fantasy, Watch the Throne, and Cruel Summer ===
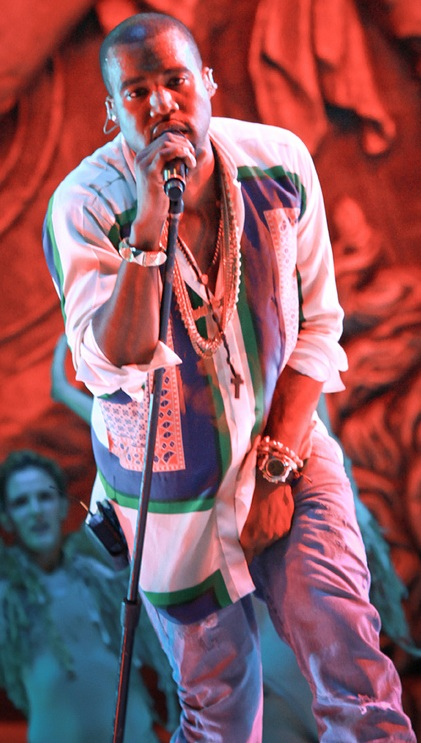
West at the SWU Music & Arts Festival in Brazil in 2011

Following the highly publicized incident, West took a brief break from music and threw himself into fashion, then returned to Hawaii for a few months writing and recording his next album. Importing his favorite producers and artists to work on and inspire his recording, West kept engineers behind the boards 24 hours a day and slept only in increments. Noah Callahan-Bever, a writer for Complex, was present during the sessions and described the "communal" atmosphere as thus: "With the right songs and the right album, he can overcome any and all controversy, and we are here to contribute, challenge, and inspire." A variety of artists contributed to the project, including close friends Jay-Z, Kid Cudi and Pusha T, as well as collaborations with artists including Justin Vernon of Bon Iver and Gil Scott Heron.

My Beautiful Dark Twisted Fantasy, West's fifth studio album, was released in November 2010 to widespread acclaim from critics, many of whom considered it his best work and said it solidified his comeback. In stark contrast to his previous effort, which featured a minimalist sound, Dark Fantasy adopts a maximalist philosophy and deals with themes of celebrity and excess. The record included the international hit "All of the Lights", and Billboard hits "Power", "Monster", and "Runaway", the latter of which accompanied a 35-minute titular film directed by and starring West. During this time, West initiated the free music program GOOD Fridays through his website, offering a free download of previously unreleased songs each Friday, a portion of which were included on the album. This promotion ran from August to December 2010. Dark Fantasy went on to go platinum in the United States, but its omission as a contender for Album of the Year at the 54th Grammy Awards was viewed as a "snub" by several media outlets.

In 2011, West went on a festival tour to commemorate the release of My Beautiful Dark Twisted Fantasy, performing and headlining at numerous festivals, including: SWU Music & Arts, Austin City Limits Music Festival, Oya Festival, Flow Festival, Live Music Festival, The Big Chill, Essence Music Festival, Lollapalooza, and Coachella, which was described by The Hollywood Reporter as "one of greatest hip-hop sets of all time". West released the collaborative album Watch the Throne with Jay-Z in August 2011. By employing a sales strategy that released the album digitally weeks before its physical counterpart, Watch the Throne became one of the few major label albums in the Internet age to avoid a leak. "Niggas in Paris" became the record's highest-charting single, peaking at number five on the Billboard Hot 100. The co-headlining Watch the Throne Tour kicked off in October 2011 and concluded in June 2012. In 2012, West released the compilation album Cruel Summer, a collection of tracks by artists from West's record label GOOD Music.

=== 2013–2015: Yeezus and the Yeezus Tour ===
Sessions for West's sixth solo effort begin to take shape in early 2013 in his own personal loft's living room at a Paris hotel. Determined to "undermine the commercial", he once again brought together close collaborators and attempted to incorporate Chicago drill, dancehall, acid house, and industrial music. Primarily inspired by architecture, West's perfectionist tendencies led him to contact producer Rick Rubin fifteen days shy of its due date to strip down the record's sound in favor of a more minimalist approach. Initial promotion of his sixth album included worldwide video projections of the album's music and live television performances. Yeezus, West's sixth album, was released June 18, 2013, to rave reviews from critics. It became his sixth consecutive number one debut, but also marked his lowest solo opening week sales.

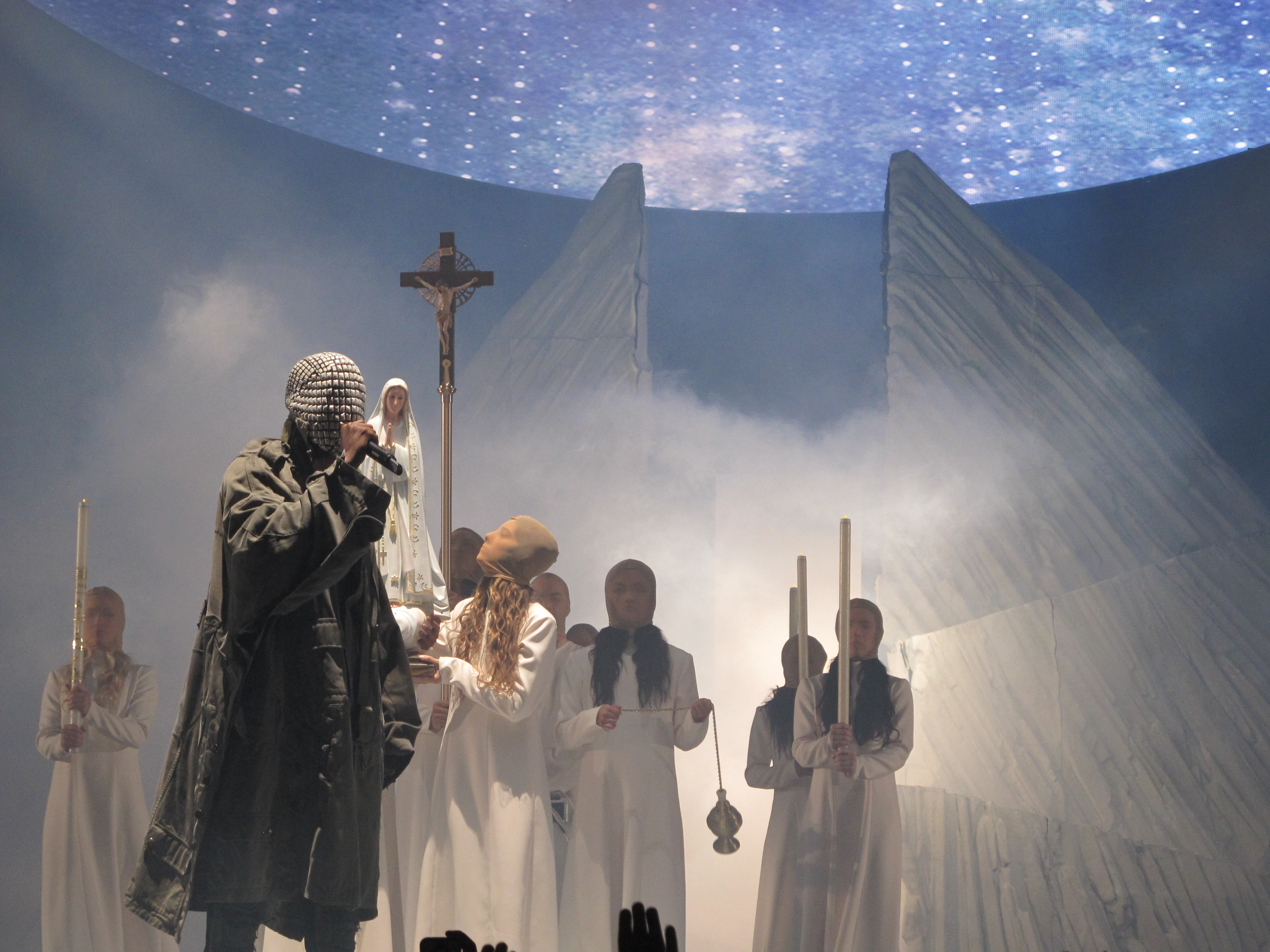
West on the Yeezus Tour in 2013

In September 2013, West announced he would be headlining his first solo tour in five years to support Yeezus, with fellow American rapper Kendrick Lamar accompanying him as a supporting act. The tour was met with rave reviews from critics. Rolling Stone described it as "crazily entertaining, hugely ambitious, emotionally affecting (really!) and, most importantly, totally bonkers". Zack O'Malley Greenburg of Forbes praised West for "taking risks that few pop stars, if any, are willing to take in today's hyper-exposed world of pop", describing the show as "overwrought and uncomfortable at times, but [it] excels at challenging norms and provoking thought in a way that just isn't common for mainstream musical acts of late". West subsequently released a number of singles featuring Paul McCartney, including "Only One" and "FourFiveSeconds", also featuring Rihanna.

In November 2013, West stated that he was beginning work on his next studio album, hoping to release it by mid-2014, with production by Rick Rubin and Q-Tip. Having initially announced a new album entitled Yeezus II slated for a 2014 release, West announced in March 2015 that the album would instead be tentatively called So Help Me God. In May 2015, West was awarded an honorary doctorate by the School of the Art Institute of Chicago for his contributions to music, fashion, and popular culture. (Note: The school rescinded the honorary degree in late 2022 in light of West's public antisemitic statements.) The next month, West headlined at the Glastonbury Festival in the UK, despite a petition signed by almost 135,000 people against his appearance. Another petition aimed to block West from headlining the 2015 Pan American Games, garnering 50,000 supporters.

=== 2016–2017: The Life of Pablo and tour cancellation ===
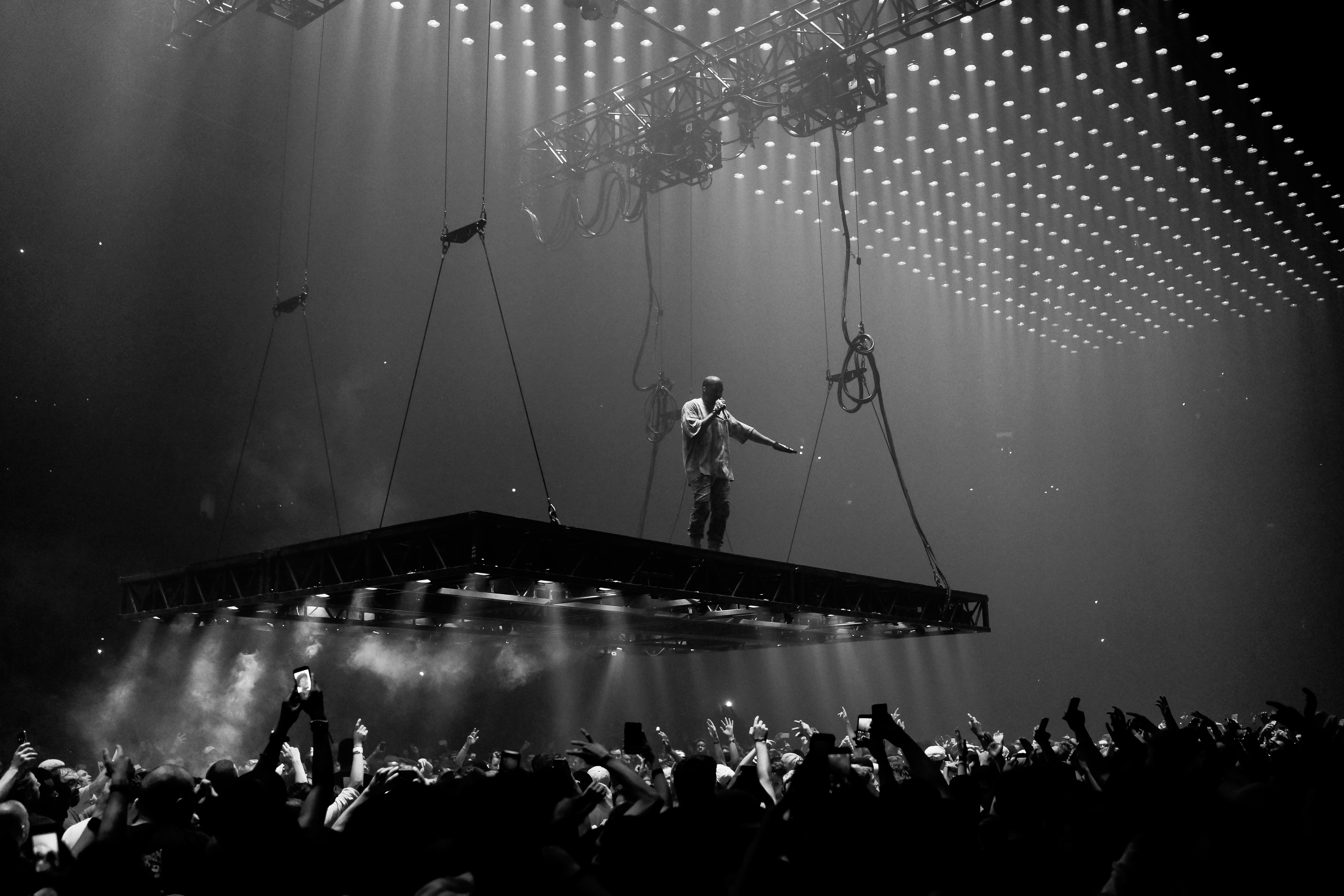
West on the Saint Pablo Tour in 2016

West announced in January 2016 that Swish would be released on February 11, and later that month, released new songs "Real Friends" and a snippet of "No More Parties in LA" with Kendrick Lamar. On January 26, 2016, West revealed he had renamed the album from Swish to Waves. In the weeks leading up to the album's release, West became embroiled in several Twitter controversies. Several days ahead of its release, West again changed the title, this time to The Life of Pablo. On February 11, West premiered the album at Madison Square Garden as part of the presentation of his Yeezy Season 3 clothing line. Following the preview, West announced that he would be modifying the tracklist once more before its release to the public. He released the album exclusively on Tidal on February 14, 2016, following a performance on Saturday Night Live. Following its release, West continued to tinker with mixes of several tracks, describing the work as "a living breathing changing creative expression" and proclaiming the end of the album as a dominant release form. Despite West's earlier comments, in addition to Tidal, the album was released through several other competing services starting in April.

In February 2016, West stated on Twitter that he was planning to release another album in the summer of 2016, tentatively called Turbo Grafx 16 in reference to the 1990s video game console of the same name. In June 2016, West released the collaborative lead single "Champions" off the GOOD Music album Cruel Winter, which has yet to be released. Later that month, West released a controversial video for "Famous", which depicted wax figures of several celebrities (including West, Kardashian, Taylor Swift, businessman and then-presidential candidate Donald Trump, comedian Bill Cosby, and former president George W. Bush) sleeping nude in a shared bed.

In August 2016, West embarked on the Saint Pablo Tour in support of The Life of Pablo. The performances featured a mobile stage suspended from the ceiling. West postponed several dates in October following the Paris robbery of several of his wife's effects. On November 21, 2016, West cancelled the remaining 21 dates on the Saint Pablo Tour, following a week of no-shows, curtailed concerts and rants about politics. He was later admitted for psychiatric observation at UCLA Medical Center. He stayed hospitalized over the Thanksgiving weekend because of a temporary psychosis stemming from sleep deprivation and extreme dehydration. Following this episode West took an 11-month break from posting on Twitter and the public in general.

=== 2017–2019: Ye and the Wyoming Sessions ===
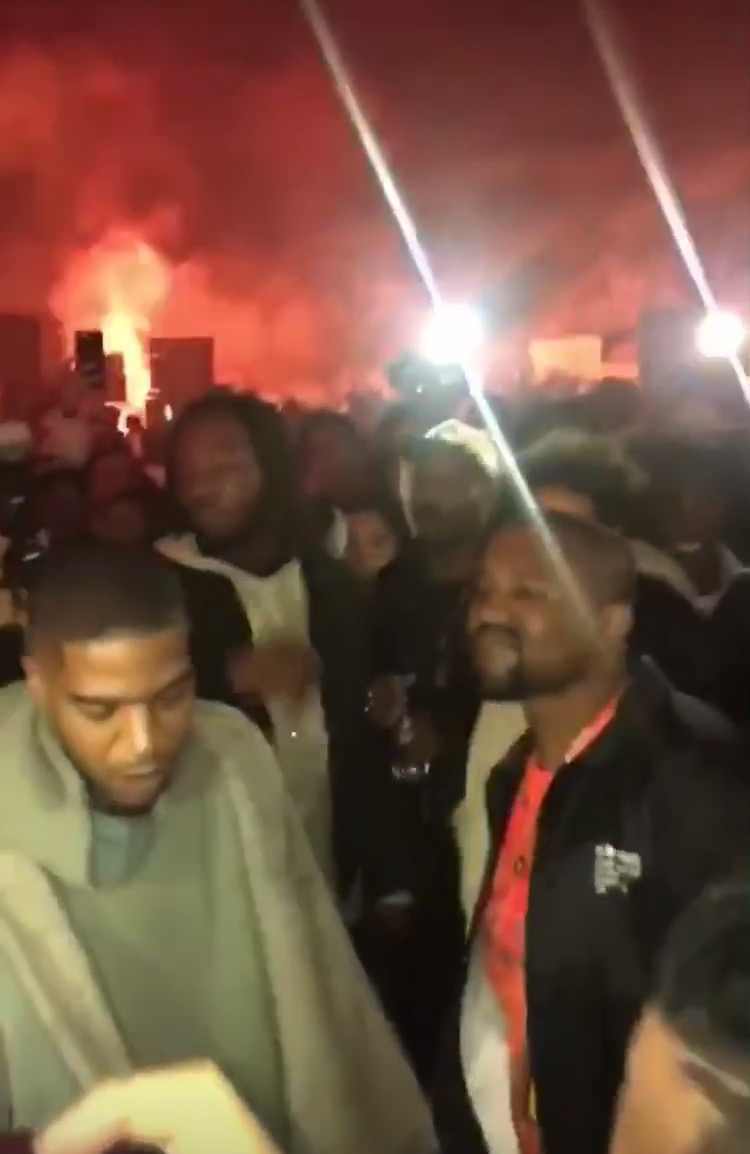
West and Kid Cudi (left) at a listening party for Kids See Ghosts in 2018

It was reported in May 2017 that West was recording new music in Jackson Hole, Wyoming, with a wide range of collaborators. In April 2018, West announced plans to write a philosophy book entitled Break the Simulation, later clarifying that he was sharing the book "in real time" on Twitter and began posting content that was likened to "life coaching". Later that month, he also announced two new albums, a solo album and self-titled collaboration with Kid Cudi under the name Kids See Ghosts, both of which would be released in June. Additionally, he revealed he would produce upcoming albums by GOOD Music label-mates Pusha T and Teyana Taylor, as well as Nas. Shortly thereafter, West released the non-album singles "Lift Yourself" and "Ye vs. the People", in which he and T.I. discusses West's support of Donald Trump.

Pusha T's Daytona, the first album to release from the Wyoming Sessions, was released in May to critical acclaim. Although, the album's artwork—a photograph of deceased singer Whitney Houston's bathroom that West paid $85,000 to license—attracted controversy. The following week, West released his eighth studio album, Ye. West has suggested that he scrapped the original recordings of the album and re-recorded it within a month. The week after, West released a collaborative album with Kid Cudi as Kids See Ghosts, titled Kids See Ghosts. West also completed production work on Nas' Nasir and Teyana Taylor's K.T.S.E., which were released in the same month.

In September, West announced his ninth studio album Yandhi to be released by the end of the month, and another collaborative album with fellow Chicagoan rapper Chance the Rapper, titled Good Ass Job. That same month, West announced that he would be changing his stage name to "Ye". Yandhi was originally set for release in September 2018 but was postponed multiple times. In January 2019, West pulled out of headlining that year's Coachella festival after negotiations broke down due to discord regarding stage design. In July, it was reported that songs from West's unreleased album Yandhi were leaked online. The following month, West's then-wife Kim Kardashian announced that his next album would be titled Jesus Is King, effectively scrapping Yandhi. By October, the entire unfinished album was available for a short time on streaming services Spotify and Tidal.

=== 2019–2022: Jesus Is King, Donda, and Donda 2 ===
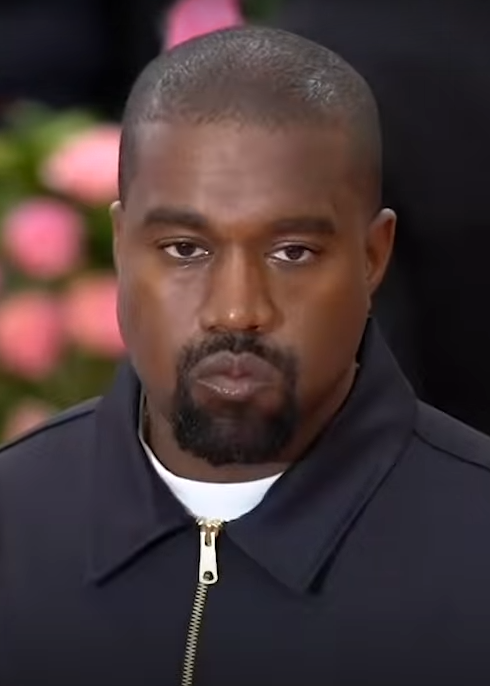
West at the Met Gala in 2019

On January 6, 2019, West started his weekly "Sunday Service" events, which included soul variations of both West's and others' songs and were attended by multiple celebrities, including the Kardashians, Charlie Wilson, and Kid Cudi. West previewed a new song, "Water" at his "Sunday Service" orchestration performance at Coachella 2019, which was later revealed to feature on his upcoming album Jesus Is King; West released the album on October 25, 2019. It became the first to ever top the Billboard 200, Top R&B/Hip-Hop Albums, Top Rap Albums, Top Christian Albums and Top Gospel Albums at the same time. On December 25, 2019, West and Sunday Service released Jesus Is Born, containing 19 songs, including several re-workings of older West songs.

Also in 2019, Kanye West premiered an opera called Nebuchadnezzar, based on the Biblical figure of the same name. The opera was directed by Vanessa Beecroft, and performed at the Hollywood Bowl in California. Sheck Wes portrayed Nebuchadnezzar, and the performance was livestreamed on Tidal. Critics lambasted it, noting how the performance was not only delayed by two hours, but ran an hour shorter than originally advertised (50 minutes, instead of two hours). In November 2026, opera musician Chase Taylor sued Kanye for what his lawsuit described as “multiple unfair and deceptive trade practices" during the making of the opera. These allegations include lying about the project being completed, being expected to have the piece be “performance-ready in just four days”. He also alleges that Kanye locked him and 150 performers inside a high school band room until the project was completed, and also allegedly didn't provide enough food for all of the performers. According to Rolling Stone, the lawsuit claims "Taylor objected to the abusive conditions and asked defendants [through West’s producer] to unlock the band room doors, provide sufficient food and water, and provide appropriate time off for the musicians to sleep. Defendants ignored these requests". As of November 14, 2026, the lawsuit is still ongoing.

West released a single titled "Wash Us in the Blood" on June 30, 2020, featuring fellow American rapper and singer Travis Scott, along with the music video, which was set to serve as the lead single from his tenth studio album Donda. However, in September 2020, West stated that he would not be releasing any further music until he is "done with [his] contract with Sony and Universal". On October 16, he released the single "Nah Nah Nah". West held several listening parties at Mercedes-Benz Stadium for his upcoming album Donda in the summer of 2021, where he had taken up temporary residence in one of the stadium's locker rooms, converting it into a recording studio to finish the recording. After multiple delays, Donda was released on August 29, 2021. West claimed the album was released early without his approval and alleged that Universal had altered the tracklist. He released a deluxe edition of Donda, including five new songs, to streaming services on November 14, 2021. On November 20, days after ending their long-running feud, West and rapper Drake confirmed that they would stage the "Free Larry Hoover" benefit concert on December 9 at the Los Angeles Memorial Coliseum.

On January 5, 2022, West was announced as one of the 2022 headliners of Coachella Valley Music and Arts Festival. Later that month on January 15, West released the first single for his upcoming album Donda 2, "Eazy" featuring The Game, to be executive produced by American rapper Future. West hosted a listening event for the album at LoanDepot Park in Miami, Florida, on February 22. In April, shortly before Coachella, West pulled out as headlining act, then proceeded to pull out of headlining Rolling Loud. West and The Game performed the single on July 22, marking West's first performance in five months following the low profile he had been keeping since Donda 2 remained unfinished. A day later, despite cancelling as headliner, he appeared at Rolling Loud during Lil Durk's set. In December 2022, after weeks of controversial antisemitic statements, West released a new song, "Someday We'll All Be Free", on his Instagram.

=== 2023–2024: Vultures 1 and 2 ===
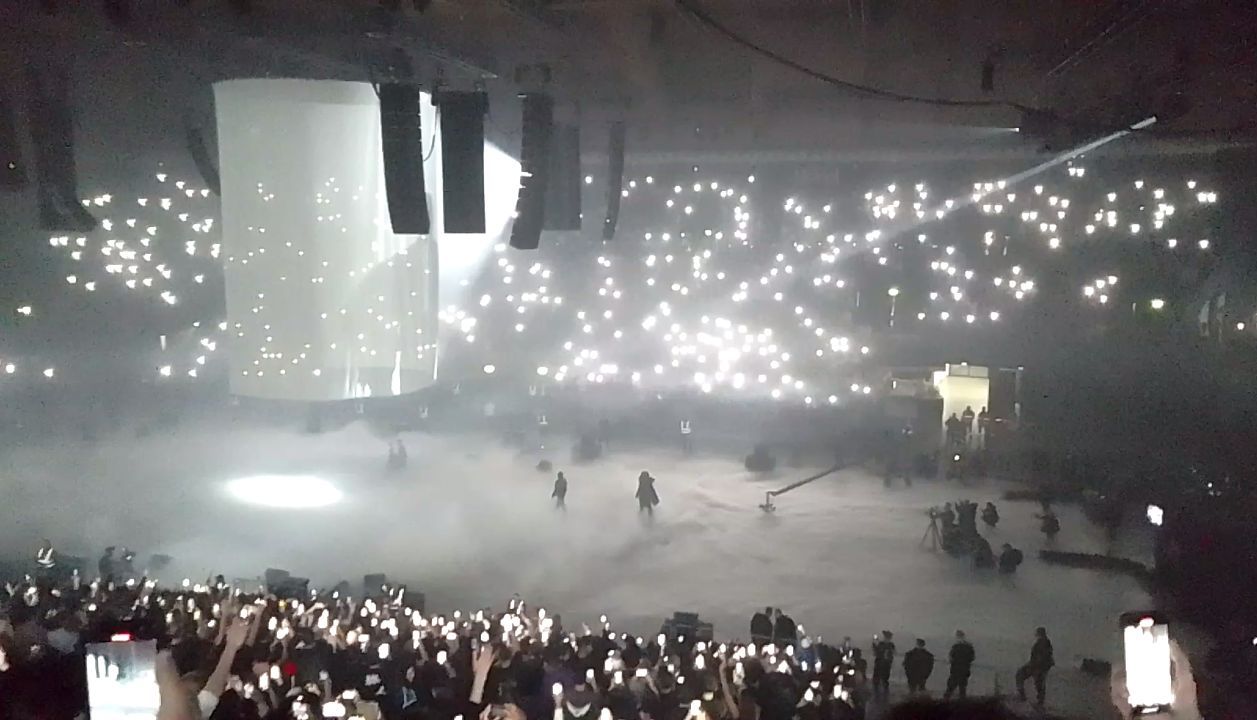
¥$ listening party in Bologna, Italy, for Vultures 1 (2024)

On August 25, 2023, West was reported to be in the process of recording his eleventh studio album, with two sources close to him stating that the release of new music was "imminent". On October 13, Billboard reported that West had finished recording a collaborative studio album with Ty Dolla Sign and was in the process of shipping the album to distributors, adding that the album was originally intended for an official release that day but was ultimately pushed back for unknown reasons and expected to drop within the coming weeks. The eponymous lead single for the album, "Vultures" featuring Bump J, was released on November 22, 2023.

Throughout late 2023 and early 2024, West and Ty Dolla Sign held several concerts previewing songs from the album. In a trailer, West announced that Vultures would be released as a trilogy of albums, with three volumes set to be released on February 9, March 6, and April 5, 2024. In January 2024, West co-signed 4Batz and called him his favorite new artist. On February 8, 2024, West released the first volume's second single, "Talking / Once Again" featuring his eldest daughter North. A day later, producer Erick Sermon revealed in an interview that West's upcoming eleventh studio album was titled Y3, while also stating that he had contributed to the album in 2023. West has since denied working on an album titled Y3.

On February 10, 2024, hours after West held a listening party at UBS Arena, the first volume of the Vultures trilogy, entitled Vultures 1, was officially released. The album debuted at number one on the Billboard 200, becoming West's eleventh consecutive and Ty Dolla Sign's first number one album, respectively. Vultures 2 released later that year on August 3.

=== 2025–present: Cuck and Bully ===
On September 28, 2024, during a concert in Haikou, China at the Wuyuan River Stadium, West announced his eleventh solo album Bully, debuting the track "Beauty and the Beast". On March 15, 2025, he shared a song on his X account, "Lonely Roads Still Go to Sunshine", featuring his daughter North and vocals credited to Sean Combs, resulting in legal action from Kim Kardashian. On March 18, he shared links on X to three versions of Bully, all of which were accompanied by a short film starring his son Saint. He stated that the album was "not finished and half of the vocals [are] AI", and added that he did not intend to release it on streaming services because of "French and Jewish record labels". Bully would later be released as the "screening version" on YouTube for a temporary time.

On March 26, 2025, West released "WW3" under the name Ye onto streaming services, after having the song been previously teased by Dave Blunts and Adin Ross. A week later, DJ Akademiks announced that West was working on WW3, a collaborative album with Blunts, a few days after they held an interview where West wore a black Ku Klux Klan-inspired outfit and said further controversial remarks. West changed the album's title to Cuck on April 21, and in the following weeks released the singles "Cousins" and "Heil Hitler". After Cuck leaked on May 18, 2025, West stated that he was "done with antisemitism", and asked God to "forgive me for the pain I've caused". West removed pro-Nazi and antisemitic lyrics from the Cuck singles, and on June 22, announced he was changing the album's title to In a Perfect World; the album was ultimately scrapped.

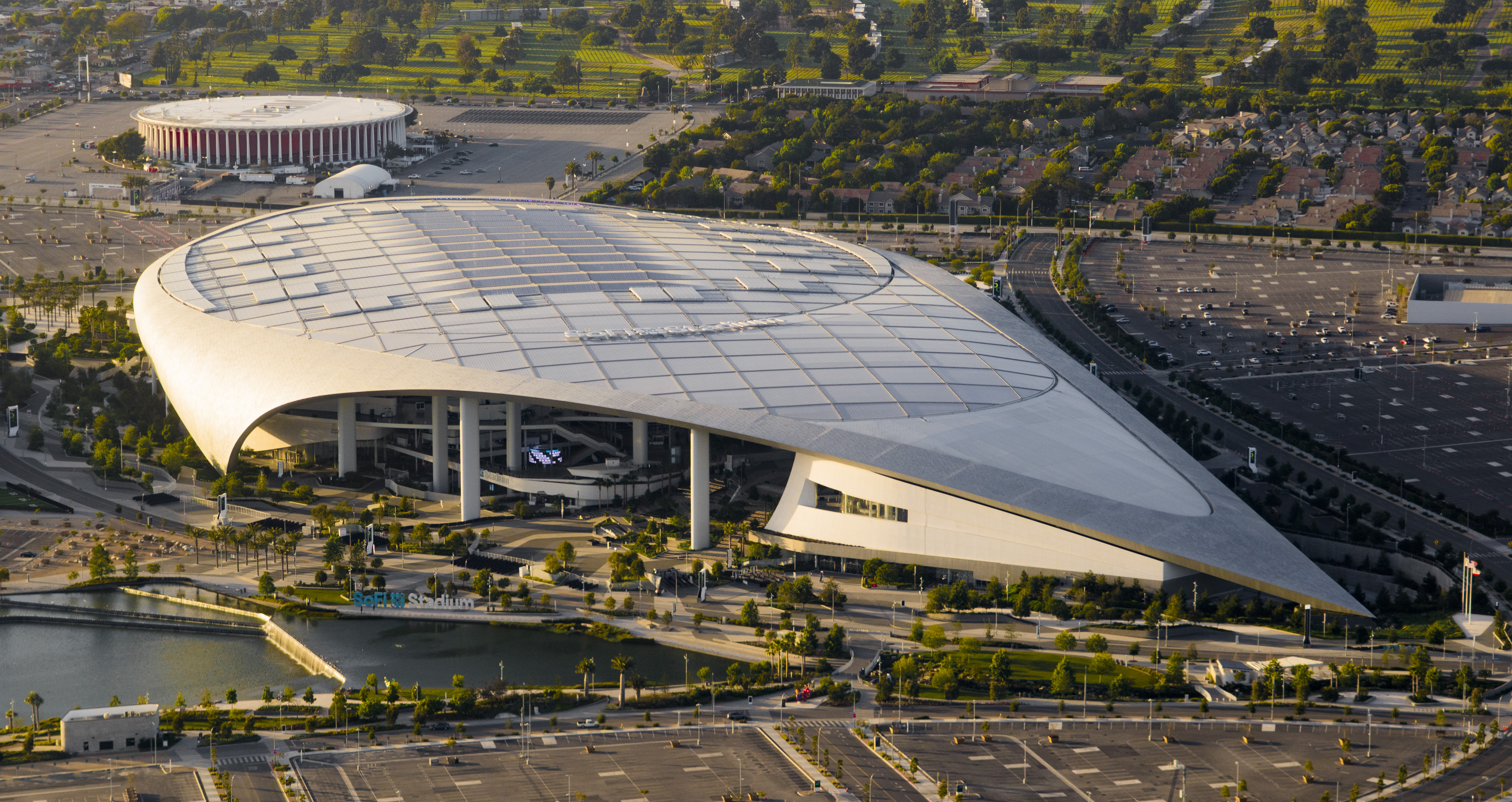
West performed at the SoFi Stadium in April 2026, following the release of Bully, selling out with $33 million and being his first concert in Los Angeles since 2021.

On April 29, West released Donda 2 on streaming services. On May 21, he released the single "Alive", featuring YoungBoy Never Broke Again, as the theme song for his upcoming YZY SZN 10 fashion collection. On June 20, West released a three-track extended play (EP) preview of Bully on streaming services. On June 27, West released Never Stop, an EP by Sean Combs' son Christian "King" Combs. West served as Never Stop's executive producer, and North appears on the song "Lonely Roads". The EP's release coincided with the closing arguments of Sean Combs' criminal trial, in which he was charged with racketeering and sex trafficking; West has been an outspoken defender of Combs.

On January 3, 2026, after multiple delays, Yeezy updated its website with pre-orders to Bully including multi-colored vinyl, cassette, CD, bundles, and digital download. West's team announced that the album would no longer feature AI-generated vocals. Bully was released digitally on March 28, following West's deal to sign with American media company Gamma. Following performances at Shanghai in July 2025 and Mexico in January 2026, Following the release of Bully, West embarked on the Ye Live Concert Tour, starting on April 1 and 3, where West performed two concerts at SoFi Stadium in Los Angeles, selling $33 million in ticket sales and marking his first performance in the city since 2021.

== Musical style ==
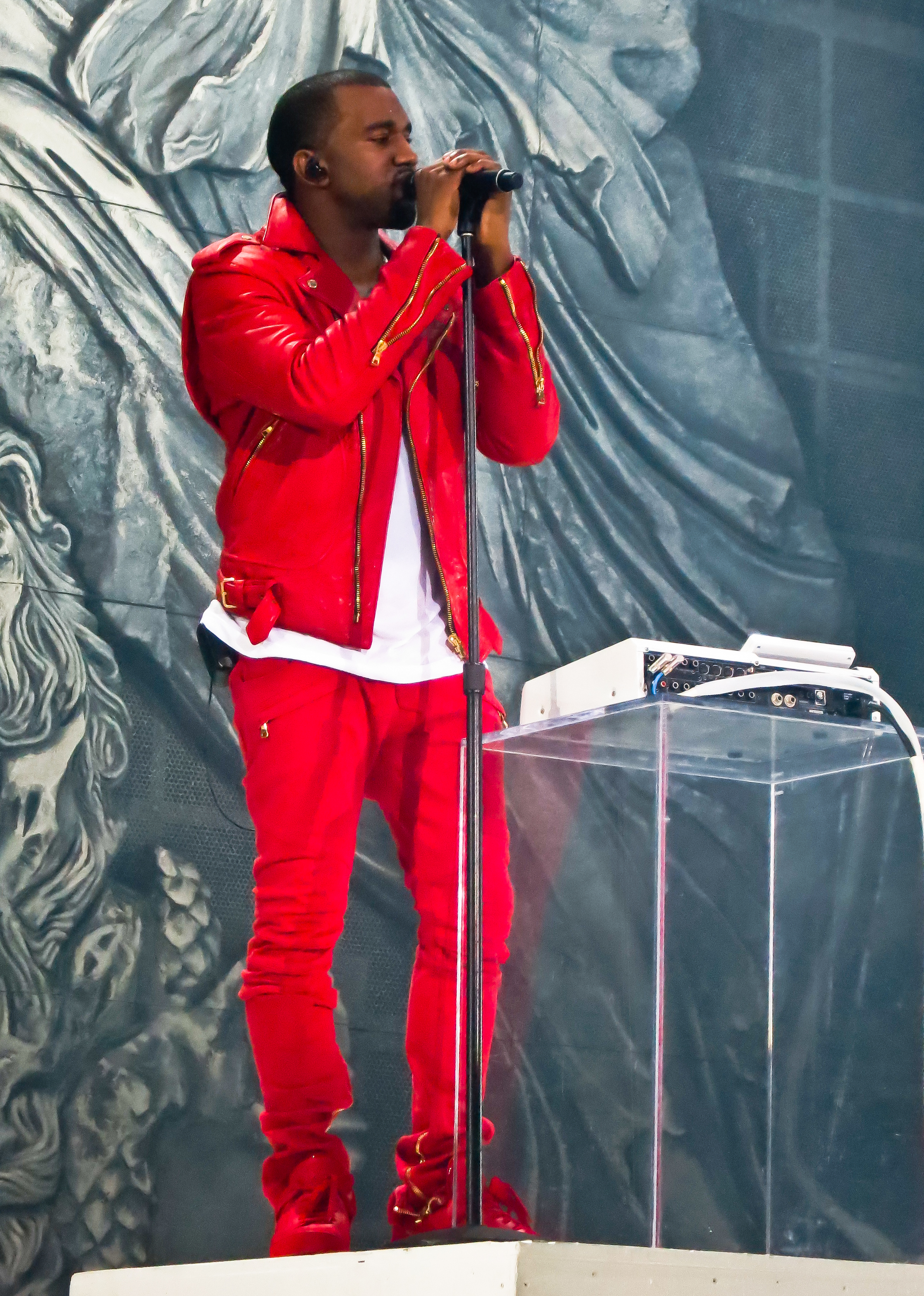
West performing in 2012

West's musical career is defined by frequent stylistic shifts and different musical approaches. In the subsequent years since his debut, West has both musically and lyrically taken an increasingly experimental approach to crafting progressive hip-hop music while maintaining accessible pop sensibilities. Ed Ledsham of PopMatters said that "West's melding of multiple genres into the hip-hop fold is a complex act that challenges the dominant white notions of what constitutes true 'art' music." West's rhymes have been described as funny, provocative and articulate, capable of seamlessly segueing from shrewd commentary to comical braggadocio to introspective sensitivity. West imparts that he strives to speak in an inclusive manner so groups from different racial and gender backgrounds can comprehend his lyrics, saying he desired to sound "just as ill as Jadakiss and just as understandable as Will Smith". Early in his career, West pioneered a style of hip-hop production dubbed "chipmunk-soul", a sampling technique involving the manipulation of tempo in order to chop and stretch pitched-up samples from vintage soul songs.

On his debut studio album, The College Dropout (2004), West formed the constitutive elements of his style, described as intricate hip-hop beats, topical subject matter, and clumsy rapping laced with inventive wordplay. The record saw West diverge from the then-dominant gangster persona in hip-hop in favor of more diverse, topical lyrical subjects, including higher education, materialism, self-consciousness, minimum-wage labor, institutional prejudice, class struggle, family, sexuality, his struggles in the music industry, and middle-class upbringing. Over time, West has explored a variety of music genres, encompassing and taking inspiration from chamber pop on his second studio album, Late Registration (2005), arena rock and europop on his third album, Graduation (2007), synth-driven electropop on his fourth album, 808s & Heartbreak (2008), acid-house, drill, industrial rap and trap on Yeezus (2013), gospel and Christian rap on The Life of Pablo (2016), Jesus Is King (2019) and Donda (2021), and psychedelic music on Kids See Ghosts (2018).

== Other ventures ==
=== Fashion ===
Early in his career, West made clear his interest in fashion and desire to work in the clothing design industry. He launched his own clothing line in spring 2006, and developed it over the following four years before the line was ultimately cancelled in 2009. In January 2007, West's first sneaker collaboration was released, a special-edition Bapesta from A Bathing Ape. In 2009, West collaborated with Nike to release his own shoe, the Air Yeezys, becoming the first non-athlete to be given a shoe deal with the company. In January 2009, he introduced his first shoe line designed for Louis Vuitton during Paris Fashion Week. The line was released in summer 2009. West has additionally designed shoewear for Italian shoemaker Giuseppe Zanotti.

In fall 2009, West moved to Rome, where he interned at Italian fashion brand Fendi, giving ideas for the men's collection. In March 2011, West collaborated with M/M Paris for a series of silk scarves featuring artwork from My Beautiful Dark Twisted Fantasy. In October 2011, West premiered his women's fashion label at Paris Fashion Week. His debut fashion show received mixed-to-negative reviews. In March 2012, West premiered a second fashion line at Paris Fashion Week. Critics deemed the sophomore effort "much improved" compared to his first show.

On December 3, 2013, Adidas officially confirmed a new shoe collaboration deal with West. After months of anticipation and rumors, West confirmed the release of the Adidas Yeezy Boosts. In 2015, West unveiled a Yeezy clothing line, premiering in collaboration with Adidas early that year. In June 2016, Adidas announced a new long-term contract with Kanye West that extended the Yeezy line to a number of stores, planning to sell sports performance products like basketball, football, and soccer, although Adidas terminated the partnership with West in October 2022 due to his antisemitic remarks. In May 2021, West signed a 10-year deal linking Yeezy with Gap Inc. to create Yeezy Gap, however, in September 2022, West announced that he was ending the deal.

=== Business ventures ===
West founded the record label and production company GOOD Music in 2004, in conjunction with Sony BMG, shortly after releasing his debut album, The College Dropout. West, alongside then-unknown Ohio singer John Legend and fellow Chicago rapper Common were the label's inaugural artists. The label houses artists including West, Big Sean, Pusha T, Teyana Taylor, Yasiin Bey / Mos Def, D'banj and John Legend, and producers including Hudson Mohawke, Q-Tip, Travis Scott, No I.D., Jeff Bhasker, and S1. GOOD Music has released ten albums certified gold or higher by the Recording Industry Association of America (RIAA). In November 2015, West appointed Pusha T the new president of GOOD Music.

In August 2008, West revealed plans to open 10 Fatburger restaurants in the Chicago area after his company, KW Foods LLC, bought the rights to the chain in Chicago. The first location opened in September 2008 in Orland Park and a second followed in January 2009. The Orland Park location closed in early 2011 due to poor sales performance.

In January 2012, West announced his establishment of the creative content company Donda, named after his late mother. In his announcement, West proclaimed that the company would "pick up where Steve Jobs left off"; Donda would operate as a "design company" with a goal to "make products and experiences that people want and can afford". In stating Donda's creative philosophy, West articulated the need to "put creatives in a room together with like minds" in order to "simplify and aesthetically improve everything we see, taste, touch, and feel". West is notoriously secretive about the company's operations, maintaining neither an official website nor a social media presence. Contemporary critics have noted the consistent minimalistic aesthetic exhibited throughout Donda creative projects.

West expressed interest in starting an architecture firm in May 2013, saying "I want to do product, I am a product person, not just clothing but water bottle design, architecture ... I make music but I shouldn't be limited to one place of creativity" and then later in November 2013, delivering a manifesto on his architectural goals during a visit to Harvard Graduate School of Design. In May 2018, West announced he was starting an architecture firm called Yeezy Home, which will act as an arm of his already successful Yeezy fashion label. In June 2018, the first Yeezy Home collaboration was announced by designer Jalil Peraza, teasing an affordable concrete prefabricated home as part of a social housing project.

In March 2015, it was announced that West is a co-owner, with various other music artists, in the music streaming service Tidal. The service specialises in lossless audio and high definition music videos. Jay-Z acquired the parent company of Tidal, Aspiro, in the first quarter of 2015. Sixteen artist stakeholders including Jay-Z, Rihanna, Beyoncé, Madonna, Chris Martin, Nicki Minaj co-own Tidal, with the majority owning a 3% equity stake. In October 2022, in response to bans he received on Twitter and Instagram stemming from his antisemitic comments, West reached an agreement in principle to acquire the alt-tech social network Parler for an undisclosed amount. Parler and West mutually agreed to terminate the proposed deal in mid-November.

=== Philanthropy ===
West, alongside his mother, founded the Kanye West Foundation in Chicago in 2003, tasked with a mission to battle dropout and illiteracy rates, while partnering with community organizations to provide underprivileged youth access to music education. In 2007, West and the Foundation partnered with Strong American Schools as part of their "Ed in '08" campaign. As spokesman for the campaign, West appeared in a series of PSAs for the organization, and hosted an inaugural benefit concert in August of that year. In 2008, following the death of West's mother, the foundation was rechristened The Dr. Donda West Foundation. The foundation ceased operations in 2011. In 2013, Kanye West and friend Rhymefest founded Donda's House, Inc., a program aimed at helping at-risk Chicago youth.

West has contributed to hurricane relief in 2005 by participating in a Hurricane Katrina benefit concert after the storm had ravaged black communities in New Orleans and in 2012 when he performed at a Hurricane Sandy benefit concert. In January 2019, West donated $10 million towards the completion of the Roden Crater by American artist James Turrell. In June 2020, in the wake of the murder of George Floyd and the following protests, he donated $2 million between the family of Floyd and other victims of police brutality, Ahmaud Arbery and Breonna Taylor. The donation funded legal fees for Arbery and Taylor's families, as well as establishing a 529 plan to fully cover college tuition for Floyd's daughter.

=== Acting and filmmaking ===
West made cameo appearances as himself in the films State Property 2 (2005) and The Love Guru (2008), and in an episode of the television show Entourage in 2007. West provided the voice for "Kenny West", a rapper, in the animated sitcom The Cleveland Show (2010–2012). In 2009, he starred in the Spike Jonze-directed short film We Were Once a Fairytale (2009), playing himself acting belligerently while drunk in a nightclub. West wrote, directed, and starred in the musical short film Runaway (2010), which heavily features music from My Beautiful Dark Twisted Fantasy. The film depicts a relationship between a man, played by West, and a half-woman, half-phoenix creature.

In 2012, West co-directed another short film, along with Alexandre Moors, titled Cruel Summer, which premiered at the 2012 Cannes Film Festival in a custom pyramid-shaped screening pavilion featuring seven screens constructed for the film. The film was meant to tie in with the compilation album of the same name to be released later that year. West made a cameo appearance in the comedy Anchorman 2: The Legend Continues (2013) as a MTV News representative in the film's fight scene. In September 2018, West announced the starting of a film production company named Half Beast, LLC. A documentary shot over 21 years featuring footage of West's early days in Chicago through the death of his mother to his presidential run was announced to debut in 2021. Titled Jeen-Yuhs, it was acquired by Netflix for $30 million and released in 2022. A documentary shot over six years with a billion-dollar budget was announced in 2024. Titled In Whose Name?, it was directed by Nico Ballesteros and was released on September 19, 2025.

=== Presidential campaigns ===
==== 2020 ====
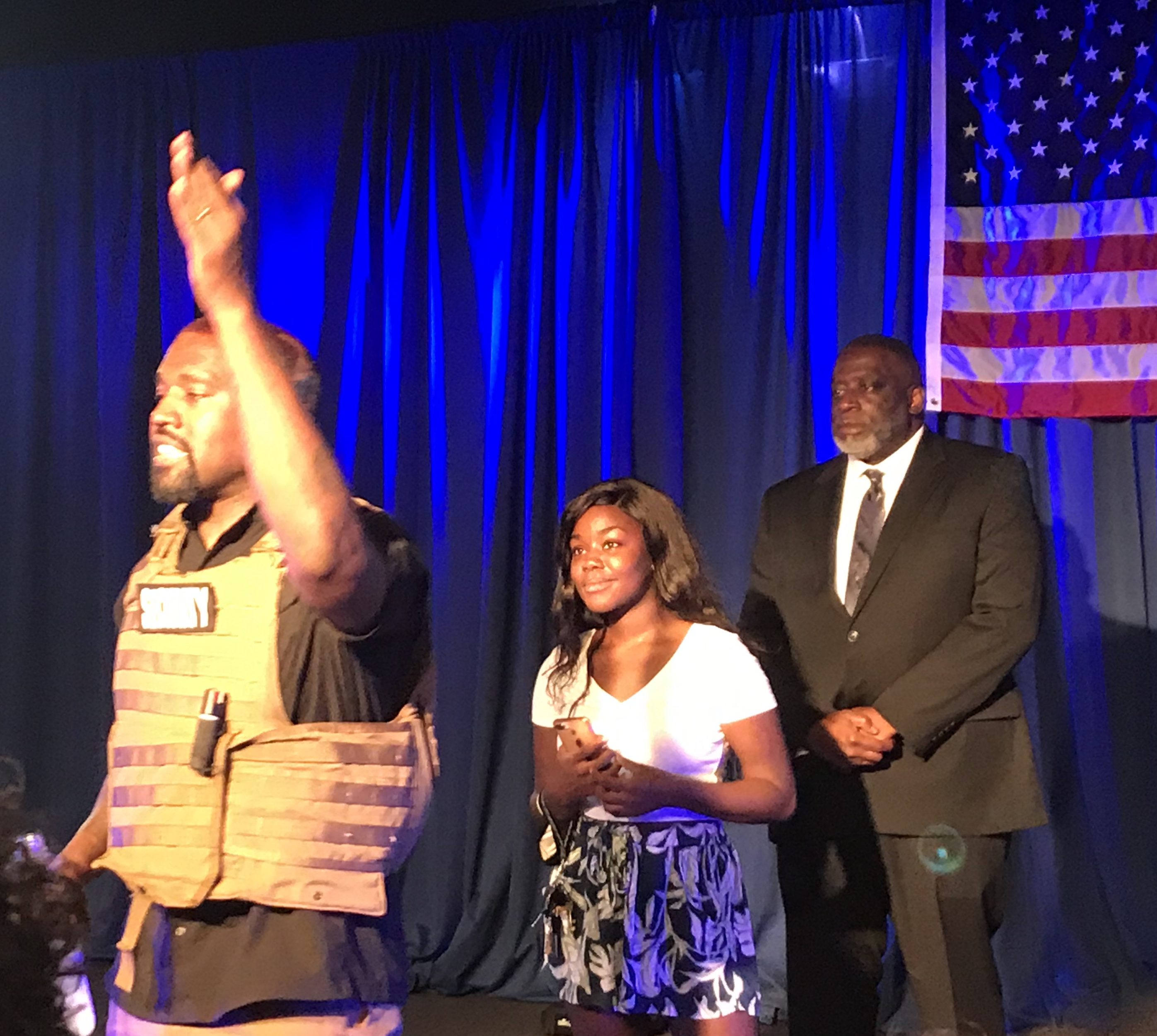
West at his first campaign rally in North Charleston, South Carolina, on July 19, 2020

On July 4, 2020, West announced on Twitter that he would be running in the 2020 presidential election. On July 7, West was interviewed by Forbes about his presidential run, where he announced that his running mate would be Wyoming preacher Michelle Tidball, and that he would run as an independent under the "Birthday Party", explaining his decision of why he chose the name, saying, "Because when we win, it's everybody's 'birthday'." West also said he no longer supported Trump because he "hid in [a] bunker" during the COVID-19 pandemic. Continuing, he said, "You know? Obama's special. Trump's special. We say Kanye West is special. America needs special people that lead. Bill Clinton? Special. Joe Biden's not special."

Various political pundits speculated that West's presidential run was a publicity stunt to promote his latest music releases. On July 15, 2020, official paperwork was filed with the Federal Election Commission for West, under the "BDY" Party affiliation amid claims that he was preparing to drop out. West held his first rally that weekend, on July 19. West aligned himself with the philosophy of a consistent life ethic, a tenet of Christian democracy. His platform advocated for the creation of a culture of life, endorsing environmental stewardship, supporting the arts, buttressing faith-based organizations, restoring school prayer, providing for a strong national defense, and "America First" diplomacy. In July 2020, West told Forbes that he is ignorant on issues such as taxes and foreign policy.

West conceded on Twitter on November 4, 2020. He received 66,365 votes in the 12 states he had ballot access in, receiving an average of 0.32%. Reported write-in votes gave West an additional 3,931 votes across 5 states. In addition, the Roque De La Fuente / Kanye West ticket won 60,160 votes in California (0.34%). According to Reuters, on January 4, 2021, a Kanye West-linked publicist pressured a Georgia election worker to confess to bogus charges of election tampering to assist Trump's false claims of election interference. In December 2021, The Daily Beast reported that West's presidential campaign received millions of dollars in services from a secret network of Republican operatives, payments to which the committee did not report. According to campaign finance experts, this was done to conceal a connection.

==== 2024 ====
West stated his intention to run for president again in the 2024 presidential election, saying at a November 2019 event, "When I run for president in 2024, we would've created so many jobs that I'm not going to run, I'm going to walk." He was met with laughter from the audience. In response to a request for additional information from the Federal Election Commission regarding the creation of a presidential exploratory committee, West's representatives emphasized that he "has not decided whether to become a candidate for president in the 2024 election" and refused to file additional paperwork with the commission. West officially launched his presidential campaign in November 2022. West claimed to have asked former president Donald Trump to be his running mate; according to West, Trump was "caught [...] off-guard" by the request and warned him of losing if he decided to run. In October 2023, an attorney for West said that he "is not a candidate for office in 2024".

== Public image ==
West has been an outspoken and controversial celebrity throughout his career, receiving criticism from the mainstream media, industry colleagues and entertainers, and three U.S. presidents. His conduct has been characterized as trolling or rage-baiting. In 2024, Damon Dash said: "[West]'s a person that pulls triggers... It's one publicity stunt after another." In the 2025 documentary In Whose Name?, West said that his bipolar disorder allows him to portray his controversial statements and actions as performance art.

West's public persona, which media outlets have described as arrogant, egocentric, and narcissistic, has garnered both praise and criticism; The Dallas Morning News described him as "the most polarizing artist in the world". The Guardian said: "Everything that happens to Kanye adds to his outsized legend. And everywhere he goes, it seems, the man ... finds people glued to their computers in protest". His performances have sparked protests; an unsuccessful petition to cancel his performance at the 2015 Pan American Games' closing ceremony received 54,000 signatures. West has been the subject of internet memes about how much he loves himself, which he referenced in the 2016 song "I Love Kanye". Spin wrote that "there is no shortage of Kanye West... making wildly passionate claims about his creative genius", such as a 2013 interview in which he ranted that his artistry was comparable to William Shakespeare's.

West has been involved in many feuds with other celebrities; Billboard described his feuds as either "hav[ing] been years in the making" or "com[ing] out of nowhere". His decade-spanning feud with Taylor Swift, which mutually affected their reputations and cultural perception, has been described as one of the music industry's most infamous. In 2018, he became embroiled in a feud with Drake after taking an instrumental Drake wanted for the nonsense song "Lift Yourself", which journalists and fans described as trolling. The feud has persisted despite attempts at reconciliation. During rants in 2025, West insulted many hip-hop artists, including Drake, Future, Iggy Azalea, Jay-Z, J. Cole, Kendrick Lamar, Metro Boomin, Playboi Carti, and Travis Scott. Most did not respond to West's attacks, prompting Forbes to question whether his manner of trolling still worked, and his feuds with Carti and Scott had been resolved by the end of the year.

=== Social and political commentary ===
In a 2005 speech, West criticized both the media and the government's racial disparities in their response to Hurricane Katrina, stating on live television "George Bush doesn't care about black people". He apologized for the comment in 2010, saying he "didn't have the grounds to call [Bush] a racist" and later stated in regard to the remark that he "was programmed to think from a victimized mentality". West voiced his opposition to abortion in 2013, citing his belief in the Sixth Commandment, and in 2022 deemed abortion "genocide and population control" of black people. In 2018, West stated that the 400-year enslavement of Africans "sounds like a choice", before elaborating that his comment was in reference to mental enslavement and argued for free thought. He later apologized for the comment on WQHT 107.5 that August.

=== Antisemitism and Nazism ===
Alternative cover art for one of West's albums announced in 2025

West's proposed Sunday Service Choir logo, based on the symbol of the Schutzstaffel (SS)

In late 2022, West made a series of antisemitic statements, resulting in the termination of his collaborations, sponsorships, and partnerships with Vogue, Universal Music Group, CAA, Balenciaga, Gap, and Adidas. Several former associates of West told Rolling Stone that he had expressed fascination with Adolf Hitler and Nazi Germany in private since the early 2000s, describing it as a "well-known but well-kept secret" within his inner circle. In November 2022, West was widely condemned after appearing at a dinner hosted by Donald Trump at Mar-a-Lago beside Nick Fuentes, a white nationalist.

In a December 2022 appearance on Alex Jones's InfoWars, West praised Hitler, denied the Holocaust, and identified as a Nazi. After the interview, West used his Twitter account to post a picture of a swastika entangled in a Star of David, and his account was terminated. According to a report published by the Anti-Defamation League (ADL) in February 2023, West's antisemitic rhetoric has caused several instances of hate-speech vandalism, harassment, and violence across the United States.

In July 2023, Elon Musk reversed the ban on his Twitter account, citing West's assurances that he would not post harmful content. In December, weeks before the slated release of his upcoming album, West apologized for his antisemitic remarks in a written statement on Instagram.

In a February 2024 interview, he said "[s]ome of the stuff I was saying was true" and that Black people cannot be antisemitic because they "are Jew [sic]". In February 2025, he professed his love for Hitler on Twitter and purchased local advertising during Super Bowl LIX which directed viewers to his website, where he was selling a swastika T-shirt. On May 8, coinciding with Victory in Europe Day, the 80th anniversary of the defeat of Nazi Germany, West released a single titled "Heil Hitler" (later renamed "Hallelujah").

In May 2025, Rolling Stone wrote that West's social media tirades had turned him into "a cultural and business pariah". That month, West renounced antisemitism, though some questioned his sincerity, with Benjamin Elterman warning that "forgiveness can be dangerous". In November, West met with the Israeli-Moroccan Orthodox rabbi Yoshiyahu Yosef Pinto to express remorse, and in January 2026, published an open letter apology in The Wall Street Journal. He blamed his antisemitism on his struggles with bipolar disorder, and said his outbursts stemmed from manic episodes in which he "gravitated toward the most destructive symbol I could find, the swastika". West denied that he is a Nazi or an antisemite, and asked for "patience and understanding".

In April 2026, West's announcement as a headliner at Wireless Festival in London drew backlash from Jewish groups and British politicians, including Prime Minister Keir Starmer, due to West's history of antisemitism. Wireless defended the selection, and West offered to meet with members of the UK's Jewish community. Festival sponsors withdrew, and the UK government blocked West from entering the country, prompting Wireless to cancel the festival. The Wall Street Journal stated that West's reputation "remains tainted" and would take time to recover. Concerts in France, Italy, Poland and India were also cancelled in April and May, but others went ahead. A concert in Albania, arranged on the personal invitation of Prime Minister Edi Rama, proceeded only after a controversial €4 million government subsidy to cover unsold tickets. Two concerts in Saint Petersburg would have made West the most prominent Western performer to play in Russia since its invasion of Ukraine before their cancellation in August.

== Personal life ==
West has been one of the wealthiest musical artists; his net worth was as high as $1.8 billion in 2021. In October 2022, Forbes estimated his net worth to have dropped to $400 million in large part due to Adidas's termination of their partnership following a series of public antisemitic statements.

=== Name change ===
In August 2021, West filed a petition in a California court to legally change his name from Kanye Omari West to simply Ye with no middle or last name; he cited "personal reasons" for the change. The request was granted by Michelle Williams Court, a Los Angeles County Superior Court judge, in October 2021. West had alluded to wishing to change his name since 2018 and had used Ye as a nickname for several years prior, stating in a 2018 interview that he believed ye (/jiː/) was the most commonly used word in the Bible: (Note: In the King James Bible, the most commonly used translation of the Christian Bible in the United States, the word that appears the most is not "ye", but rather "Lord" (not counting indefinite articles).) "In the Bible it means 'you'. So, I'm you. I'm us. It's us. It went from being Kanye, which means the only one, to just Ye." He has said that the name Ye represents him without an ego, and has referred to "Kanye West" as his slave name. West began releasing music under the name Ye and made an effort to change his social media handles from @kanyewest to @ye in 2025. HotNewHipHop noted that the public still generally referred to him using his birth name, "[w]hether for SEO reasons, force of habit, animosity, or intentional suppression". As a result, both names have remained in common use, with "Kanye West" continuing to serve as the primary identifier for much of his existing music catalogue and what he is most famously known by.

=== Relationships and family ===
In April 2025, West said that he and a male cousin had an incestuous relationship as children. The relationship began when they attempted reenacting what they saw in gay pornography magazines that West had discovered in his mother's closet. West said that he performed oral sex on his cousin until he was 14, when he ended the relationship.

==== Kim Kardashian ====
In April 2012, West began dating reality television star Kim Kardashian, with whom he had already been long-time friends. West and Kardashian became engaged in October 2013, and married at Fort di Belvedere in Florence in May 2014, marking West's first and Kardashian's third marriage. Their private ceremony was subject to widespread mainstream coverage, with which West took issue. The couple's high-profile status and respective careers resulted in their relationship becoming subject to heavy media coverage; The New York Times referred to their marriage as "a historic blizzard of celebrity".

West and Kardashian have four children: North West (born June 2013), Saint West (born December 2015), Chicago West (born via surrogate in January 2018), and Psalm West (born via surrogate in May 2019). In July 2020, during a presidential campaign rally of his, West revealed that he had previously considered abortion during Kardashian's first pregnancy but has since adopted anti-abortion views. In April 2015, West and Kardashian traveled to Jerusalem to have North baptized in the Armenian Apostolic Church at the Cathedral of St. James.

In September 2018, West announced that he would be permanently moving back to Chicago to establish his Yeezy company headquarters there. This did not actually occur, and West instead went on to purchase two ranches near Cody, Wyoming, where he recorded his eighth solo studio album, Ye. Kardashian resides with their children in a home that the now-divorced couple owns in California, whereas West moved into a home across the street to continue to be near their children. In October 2021, West began the process of selling his Wyoming ranch.

In July 2020, West acknowledged the possibility of Kardashian ending their marriage due to his adoption of anti-abortion views. Later that month, West wrote on Twitter that he had been attempting to divorce Kardashian. He also wrote that the Kardashian family was attempting "to lock [him] up". In January 2021, CNN reported that the couple were discussing divorce. A month later, Kardashian filed for divorce, with the couple citing "irreconcilable differences", agreeing to joint custody of their children, and declining spousal support from each other. The divorce settlement was finalized in November 2022, and West was ordered to pay $200,000 in monthly child support and be responsible for half of the children's medical, educational, and security expenses.

==== Other relationships ====
West began an on-and-off relationship with the designer Alexis Phifer in 2002, and they became engaged in August 2006. They ended their 18-month engagement in 2008. Phifer stated that the pair had split amicably and remained friends. West dated model Amber Rose from 2008 until mid-2010. In an interview following their split, West stated that he had to take "30 showers" before committing to his next relationship with Kim Kardashian. In response, Rose stated that she had been "bullied" and "slut-shamed" by West throughout their relationship.

In January 2022, actress Julia Fox confirmed in an Interview essay that she was dating West. West continued to say that he wanted his "family back" and publicly lashed out at Kardashian's new boyfriend, comedian Pete Davidson. His treatment of Davidson and Kardashian has been described by commentators as harassment and abusive; the 64th Annual Grammy Awards dropped him as a performer in response to his "concerning online behavior". Less than two months after confirming their relationship, Fox said that she and West had split up but remained on good terms. She later said that she dated West purely to "give people something to talk about" during the COVID-19 pandemic and to "get him off Kim's case".

In January 2023, West married the Australian designer Bianca Censori, who works for West's Yeezy brand, in a private ceremony in Beverly Hills. The tabloid website TMZ wrote the couple did not file for a marriage license. In response to West's subsequent trips to Australia to visit Censori's family, Australian Minister for Education Jason Clare commented that West may be denied a visa due to his recent antisemitic remarks. The Executive Council of Australian Jewry and the Anti-Defamation Commission further argued against granting West entry. In April 2025, West claimed in the song "Bianca" that Censori had left him following his controversial Twitter comments, but shared a photo later that month showing that they were still together.

=== Legal issues ===
West has been accused of the extensive use of uncleared samples in his music, leading to numerous lawsuits. On June 29, 2022, a complaint was filed in U.S. District Court in New York claiming copyright infringement due to unauthorized use of a sample on the song "Flowers". The complaint claimed that West sampled Marshall Jefferson's 1986 house track "Move Your Body" without gaining permission or providing compensation.

In 2014, after an altercation with a paparazzo at the Los Angeles Airport, West was sentenced to serve two years' probation for a misdemeanor battery conviction, and was required to attend 24 anger management sessions, perform 250 hours of community service, and pay restitution to the photographer. A separate civil lawsuit brought by the paparazzo was settled in 2015, a week before it was due for trial. According to TMZ, an appeal to have West's conviction expunged from his criminal record was granted by a judge in 2016. In July 2022, West was sued for $416,000 by the fashion rental company the David Casavant Archive. The lawsuit claimed that West had failed to make payments on and return 13 rented pieces.

West was sued three times in 2024. The first lawsuit, filed by a former security guard in April, accused him of racial discrimination, alleging he treated black employees worse than white ones. The second, filed by his former assistant Lauren Pisciotta in June, accused him of wrongful termination, sexual harassment, and breach of contract; Pisciotta amended the lawsuit to include sexual assault later that year, and to include stalking, sexual battery, sex trafficking, and false imprisonment in July 2025. West denied the allegations and said he planned to countersue Pisciotta for "sexual coercion"; he settled the lawsuit in 2026. The third, filed by a former model in November, accused him of sexual assault and strangulation. The accuser said that during a music video set, West choked and gagged her.

West and Censori testified in a trial related to West's Malibu mansion renovation in late February 2026. West purchased the mansion for $57.3 million in 2021 before deconstructing it to its "bare structure" and eventually selling the property for $21 million in 2024. The lawsuit was filed by Tony Saxon, a construction worker who was hired in 2021 to manage security and renovations at the property. He said that he was promised $20,000 per week but was only paid once, that dangerous conditions were prevalent in the construction, and that West fired Saxon after he reported safety concerns. The trial began on February 24. On March 11, West was found liable in a mixed verdict; the jury ordered him to pay Saxon $140,000 in addition to attorney fees and court costs, but found he neither acted with malice nor wrongfully terminated Saxon.

In April 2026, an anonymous man filed a lawsuit against West, accusing him of punching and attacking him as he laid unconscious on the floor at a Los Angeles restaurant exactly two years prior. The lawsuit claimed it was a "cowardly attack" that was "shocking, physically harmful, and offensive." He further stated that West immediately returned to his security team while the anonymous man was given medical treatment following the incident. The lawsuit hints a prior interaction involving a woman in West's entourage, but was only given in a few details.

=== Religious beliefs ===
After the success of his song "Jesus Walks" from the album The College Dropout, West was asked about his beliefs and said, "I will say that I'm spiritual. I have accepted Jesus as my Savior. And I will say that I fall short every day." In a 2008 interview with The Fader, West stated that "I'm like a vessel, and God has chosen me to be the voice and the connector". In a 2009 interview with online magazine Bossip, West stated that he believed in God, but at the time felt that he "would never go into a religion". In 2014, West referred to himself as a Christian during one of his concerts. Kim Kardashian stated in September 2019: "He has had an amazing evolution of being born again and being saved by Christ." In October 2019, West said with respect to his past, "When I was trying to serve multiple gods it drove me crazy" in reference to the "god of ego, god of money, god of pride, the god of fame", and that "I didn't even know what it meant to be saved" and that now "I love Jesus Christ. I love Christianity." During an interview with Big Boy in March 2024, West revealed he had "issues with Jesus" after missed prayers, before declaring himself as God.

=== Politics ===
In September 2012, West donated $1,000 to Barack Obama's re-election campaign; further, in August 2015, West donated $2,700 to Hillary Clinton's 2016 campaign. He also donated $15,000 to the Democratic National Committee in October 2014. In December 2016, West met with President-elect Donald Trump to discuss bullying, supporting teachers, modernizing curriculums, and violence in Chicago. West subsequently stated he would have voted for Trump had he voted. In February 2017, however, West deleted all his tweets about Trump in purported dislike of the new president's policies, particularly the travel ban. West reiterated his support for Donald Trump in April 2018. In October 2018, West donated to progressive Chicago mayoral candidate Amara Enyia.

On June 29, 2024, West traveled to Moscow, Russia, to celebrate the 40th birthday of the Russian fashion designer Gosha Rubchinskiy. For this, the Ukrainian politician George Tuka labeled West an "enemy of Ukraine"; he traveled during the war between Russia and Ukraine, and Tuka said the money West spent on his trip would fund "the murder of civilians of Ukraine".

=== Mental health ===
West's right frontal lobe was damaged during his 2002 car accident, but he did not receive a formal diagnosis until 2023. According to West, the doctors' focus on his broken jaw resulted in the brain injury going unnoticed, contributing to his struggles with mental illness in the following decades. In his song "FML" (2016) and his featured verse on Vic Mensa's song "U Mad" (2015), he refers to using the antidepressant medication Lexapro, and in his unreleased song "I Feel Like That" (2015), he mentions feeling many common symptoms of depression and anxiety.

On November 19, 2016, West abruptly ended a concert before being committed at the recommendation of authorities to the UCLA Medical Center with hallucinations and paranoia. While the episode was first described as one of "temporary psychosis" caused by dehydration and sleep deprivation, West's mental state was abnormal enough for his 21 cancelled concerts to be covered by his insurance policy. He was reportedly paranoid and depressed throughout the hospitalization, but remained formally undiagnosed. Some have speculated that the Paris robbery of his wife may have triggered the paranoia. On November 30, West was released from the hospital.

In a 2018 interview, West said that he had become addicted to opioids when they were prescribed to him after liposuction. The addiction may have contributed to his nervous breakdown in 2016. In addition to his opioid addiction, West has stated that he has had addictions to alcohol, sex, and pornography. West said that he often has suicidal ideation. West was diagnosed with bipolar disorder in 2016, though his diagnosis was not made public until his 2018 album Ye. He told President Donald Trump that it was a misdiagnosis. He had reportedly accepted the diagnosis again by 2019, but again suggested that it had been a misdiagnosis in 2022. However, in 2025, he attributed his then-recent antisemitic remarks to it. In December 2022, he suggested that he may be autistic, and later said in February 2025 that he had received a professional diagnosis.

In August 2024, West's former Chief of Staff Milo Yiannopoulos stated in an affidavit filed to the California Dental Board that West was addicted to nitrous oxide. He alleged that dentist Thomas Connelly, who installed titanium prosthodontics for West in January 2024, had moved into West's apartment building and was charging him $50,000 a month to supply the drugs. In May 2025, West and Censori sued Connelly for "medical malpractice, professional negligence, and related tortious and contractual violations". Their lawyer, Andrew Cherkasky, said that West "experienced increased confusion, mood instability, anxiety, and depression" as a result of Connelly's alleged role in facilitating the addiction.

== Musical influence ==
West is among the most critically acclaimed popular music artists of the 21st century, earning praise from music critics, industry peers, and cultural figures. In 2014, NME named him the third most influential artist in music. Billboard senior editor Alex Gale declared West "absolutely one of the best, and you could make the argument for the best artist of the 21st century." Sharing similar sentiments, Dave Bry of Complex Magazine called West the twenty-first century's "most important artist of any art form, of any genre." The Atlantic writer David Samuels commented, "Kanye's power resides in his wild creativity and expressiveness, his mastery of form, and his deep and uncompromising attachment to a self-made aesthetic that he expresses through means that are entirely of the moment: rap music, digital downloads, fashion, Twitter, blogs, live streaming video." Joe Muggs of The Guardian argued that "there is nobody else who can sell as many records as West does [...] while remaining so resolutely experimental and capable of stirring things up culturally and politically."

Rolling Stone credited West with transforming hip-hop's mainstream, "establishing a style of introspective yet glossy rap" while deeming him "a producer who created a signature sound and then abandoned it to his imitators, a flashy, free-spending sybarite with insightful things to say about college, culture, and economics, an egomaniac with more than enough artistic firepower to back it up." Writing for Highsnobiety, Shahzaib Hussain stated that West's first three albums "cemented his role as a progressive rap progenitor". AllMusic editor Jason Birchmeier described West as "[shattering] certain stereotypes about rappers, becoming a superstar on his own terms without adapting his appearance, his rhetoric, or his music to fit any one musical mold". Lawrence Burney of Noisey has credited West with the commercial decline of the gangsta rap genre that once dominated mainstream hip-hop. The release of his third studio album Graduation has been described as a turning point in the music industry, and is considered to have helped pave the way for new rappers who did not follow the hardcore-gangster mold to find wider mainstream acceptance.

Hip-hop artists like Drake, Nicki Minaj, Kendrick Lamar, Travis Scott, Playboi Carti, Lil Uzi Vert, and Chance the Rapper have acknowledged being influenced by West. Several other artists and music groups of various genres have named West as an influence on their work. (Note: Musical artists and groups naming West as an influence: Casey Veggies; Adele; Lily Allen; Daniel Caesar; Lorde; Rosalía; Halsey; Arctic Monkeys; Kasabian; MGMT; Yeah Yeah Yeahs; Fall Out Boy; James Blake; Daniel Lopatin; Tim Hecker; Rakim; John Legend; Liv.e; Charli XCX)

== Achievements ==
West is the fourth-highest certified artist in the U.S. by digital singles (69 million). He had the most RIAA digital song certifications by a male artist in the 2000s (19), and was the fourth best-selling digital songs artist of the 2000s in the U.S. In Spotify's first ten years from 2008 to 2018, West was the sixth most streamed artist, and the fourth fastest artist to reach one billion streams. West has the joint-most consecutive studio album to debut at number one on the Billboard 200 (9) and was the first rapper to top the Billboard Hot 100 in three distinct decades (2000s, 2010s, 2020s). He ranked third on Billboard's 2000s decade-end list of top producers and has topped the annual Pazz & Jop critics' poll the joint-most times (four albums) with Bob Dylan.

West has been nominated for 75 Grammys, of which he has won 24. He has been the most nominated act at five ceremonies, and has received the fourth-most wins overall in the 2000s. In 2008, West became the first solo artist to have his first three albums receive nominations for Album of the Year. West has won a Webby Award for Artist of the Year, an Accessories Council Excellence Award for being a stylemaker, International Man of the Year at the GQ Awards, a Clio Award for The Life of Pablo Album Experience, and an honour by The Recording Academy. West is one of eight acts to have won the Billboard Artist Achievement Award. In 2015, he became the third rap act to win the Michael Jackson Video Vanguard Award.

West's first six solo studio albums were included on Rolling Stone's 2020 list of the 500 Greatest Albums of All Time. Entertainment Weekly named The College Dropout the best album of the 2000s, Complex named Graduation the best album released between 2002 and 2012, 808s & Heartbreak was named by Rolling Stone as one of the 40 most groundbreaking albums of all time, The A.V. Club named My Beautiful Dark Twisted Fantasy the best album of the 2010s, Yeezus was the most critically acclaimed album of 2013 according to Metacritic, and The Life of Pablo was the first album to top the Billboard 200, go platinum in the U.S., and go gold in the UK via streaming alone.

== Discography ==
Solo studio albums

- The College Dropout (2004)
- Late Registration (2005)
- Graduation (2007)
- 808s & Heartbreak (2008)
- My Beautiful Dark Twisted Fantasy (2010)
- Yeezus (2013)
- The Life of Pablo (2016)
- Ye (2018)
- Jesus Is King (2019)
- Donda (2021)
- Donda 2 (2022)
- Bully (2026)

Collaborative studio albums

- Watch the Throne (with Jay-Z) (2011)
- Kids See Ghosts (with Kid Cudi, as Kids See Ghosts) (2018)
- Vultures 1 (with Ty Dolla Sign, as ¥$) (2024)
- Vultures 2 (with Ty Dolla Sign, as ¥$) (2024)

Compilation albums

- Cruel Summer (with GOOD Music) (2012)

== Videography ==
- The College Dropout Video Anthology (2004)
- Late Orchestration (2006)
- VH1 Storytellers (2010)
- Runaway (2010)
- Jesus Is King (2019)
- Jeen-Yuhs (2022)
- Bully V1 (2025)
- In Whose Name? (2025)

== Tours ==
Headlining tours

- School Spirit Tour (2004)
- Touch the Sky Tour (2005–2006)
- Glow in the Dark Tour (2008)
- Watch the Throne Tour (with Jay-Z) (2011–2012)
- The Yeezus Tour (2013–2014)
- Saint Pablo Tour (2016)
- Ye Live Concert Tour (2026–2027)

Supporting tours

- Truth Tour (with Usher) (2004)
- Vertigo Tour (with U2) (2005–2006)
- A Bigger Bang (with the Rolling Stones) (2006)

== Books ==
- Thank You and You're Welcome (2009)
- Through the Wire: Lyrics & Illuminations (2009)
- Glow in the Dark (2009)

== See also ==
- Black conservatism in the United States
- List of people with bipolar disorder
- List of Christian hip-hop artists
