= Ty Dolla Sign discography =

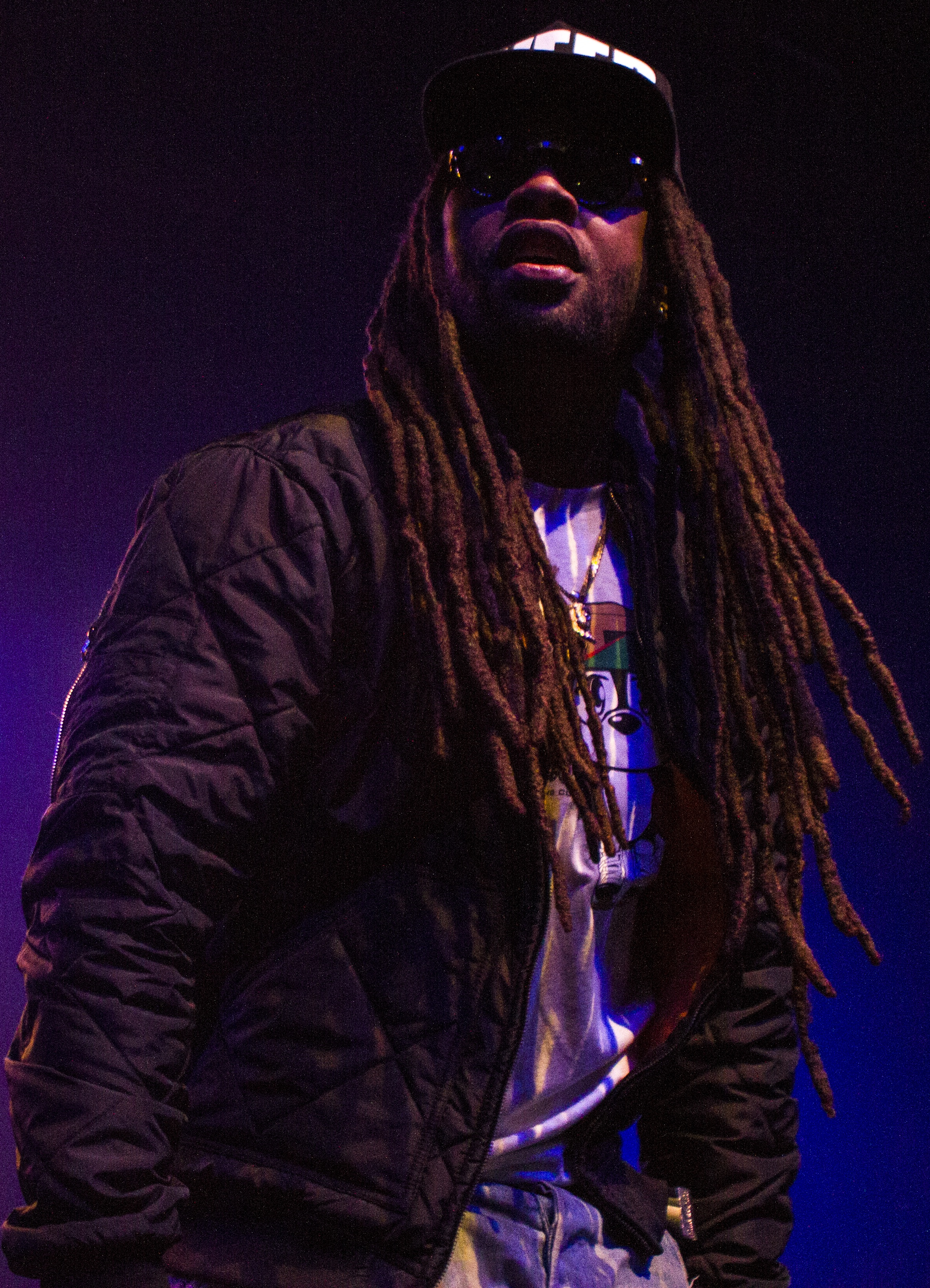
- Ty Dolla Sign in 2013
- Studio albums: 4
- EPs: 2
- Singles: 55
- Mixtapes: 8

The discography of American singer Ty Dolla Sign consists of four studio albums, two extended plays (EP), seven mixtapes and fifty-five singles (as well as 92 singles as a featured artist).

In May 2011, Ty Dolla Sign released his debut mixtape, House on the Hill, which includes his debut single "All Star" (featuring Joe Moses). After releasing additional mixtapes from 2011 to 2012, Ty Dolla Sign signed a recording contract with Wiz Khalifa's record label, Taylor Gang Records. In 2013, he signed onto a joint venture with Atlantic Records. In January 2014, he released his first extended play and major label debut, Beach House EP, which was preceded by the 2013 single "Paranoid" (featuring Atlantic labelmate B.o.B)—his first entry on the Billboard Hot 100 as a lead artist—and spawned the single "Or Nah" (featuring Wiz Khalifa and Mustard).

Ty Dolla Sign released his debut studio album, Free TC on November 13, 2015; it was supported by the moderately successful singles "Blasé" (featuring Rae Sremmurd and Future) and "Saved" (featuring E-40). His second album, Beach House 3 (2017), debuted at number 11 on the Billboard 200, but failed to spawn any charting singles. Ty Dolla Sign first topped the Billboard Hot 100 with his guest appearance on American singer Post Malone's 2018 single "Psycho", and also had chart success as a guest performer on the Jason Derulo's "Swalla" that same year, as well as Megan Thee Stallion's "Hot Girl Summer" the following year. Ty Dolla Sign's third studio album, Featuring Ty Dolla Sign (2020), debuted at number four on the chart and spawned two Billboard Hot 100 entries: "Expensive" (featuring Nicki Minaj) and "Spicy" (featuring Post Malone).

He saw his biggest commercial success with his 2024 collaborative album with Kanye West—under the superduo name ¥$—Vultures 1, which debuted atop the Billboard 200 and spawned his first Billboard Hot 100-number-one single as a lead artist, "Carnival" (with Rich the Kid featuring Playboi Carti). The album's direct sequel, Vultures 2, was released in August of that year and debuted at number two on the Billboard 200.

== Albums ==
=== Studio albums ===
List of albums, with selected chart positions
Title	Details	Peak chart positions										Certifications
Title	Details	US	US R&B/HH	US Rap	AUS	BEL	CAN	FRA	IRE	NZ	UK	Certifications
Free TC	Released: November 13, 2015; Label: Atlantic; Format: CD, LP, digital download	14	4	3	87	132	45	159	—	—	93	RIAA: Gold
Beach House 3	Released: October 27, 2017; Label: Atlantic; Format: CD, LP, digital download	11	8	7	37	86	45	159	—	—	53	RIAA: Gold; RMNZ: Gold
Featuring Ty Dolla Sign	Released: October 23, 2020; Label: Atlantic; Format: CD, LP, digital download	4	2	—	52	125	5	87	98	28	66	RMNZ: Gold
Tycoon	Released: October 17, 2025; Label: Atlantic; Format: CD, digital download, streaming	—	—	—	94	—	—	—	—	—	—	
"—" denotes a recording that did not chart or was not released in that territory.

=== Collaborative albums ===
Collaborative studio album, with selected details
Title	Details	Peak chart positions										Sales	Certifications
Title	Details	US	US R&B/HH	US Rap	AUS	BEL	CAN	FRA	IRE	NZ	UK	Sales	Certifications
MihTy (with Jeremih, as MihTy)	Released: October 26, 2018; Label: 4Hunnid, Taylor Gang, Atlantic, Def Jam; Format: Digital download, streaming	60	33	—	—	—	75	—	—	—	—		
Cheers to the Best Memories (with Dvsn)	Released: August 20, 2021; Label: OVO, Warner; Format: Digital download, streaming	139	—	—	—	—	—	—	—	—	—		
Vultures 1 (with Kanye West as ¥$)	Released: February 10, 2024; Label: YZY, Label Engine; Format: CD, LP, digital download, streaming	1	1	1	1	1	1	9	2	1	2	US: 20,000	RIAA: Gold; BPI: Gold; IFPI DEN: Gold; RMNZ: Gold
Vultures 2 (with Kanye West as ¥$)	Released: August 3, 2024; Label: YZY, Label Engine; Format: CD, LP, digital download, streaming	2	1	1	4	7	1	16	6	3	7	US: 60,500	
"—" denotes a recording that did not chart or was not released in that territory.

== Extended plays ==
List of extended plays, with selected chart positions
Title	Details	Peak chart positions		
Title	Details	US	US R&B/HH	US R&B
Beach House EP	Released: January 21, 2014; Label: Atlantic; Format: CD, LP, digital download	51	13	7
Talk About It in the Morning (with Wiz Khalifa)	Released: March 31, 2015; Label: Taylor Gang; Format: Digital download	Free release		
Girl Music Vol. 1	Released: March 6, 2026; Label: Atlantic; Format: Digital download	—	—	—

== Mixtapes ==
=== Free mixtapes ===
Title	Details
House on the Hill	Released: May 2, 2011; Hosted by DJ ill Will and DJ Mustard; Format: Digital download
Back Up Drive Vol. 1	Released: August 27, 2011; Hosted by DJ ill Will, DJ Mustard and The LA Leakers; Format: Digital download
Back Up Drive Vol. 2	Released: 2012; Hosted by DJ ill Will, DJ Mustard and The LA Leakers; Format: Digital download
Whoop! (with Joe Moses)	Released: May 7, 2012; Produced by DJ Mustard; Format: Digital download
Beach House	Released: October 1, 2012; Hosted by DJ ill Will and DJ Mustard; Format: Digital download
Beach House 2	Released: July 1, 2013; Hosted by DJ Drama; Format: Digital download
$ign Language	Released: August 25, 2014; Format: Digital download
Airplane Mode	Released: October 13, 2015; Format: Digital download

=== Commercial mixtapes ===
List of mixtapes with selected album details
Title	Details	Peak chart positions							
Title	Details	US	US R&B/HH	US Rap	AUS	BEL	CAN	FRA	NZ Heat.
Campaign	Released: September 23, 2016; Label: Atlantic; Format: Digital download, streaming	28	7	5	100	144	45	28	8

== Singles ==
=== As lead artist ===
List of singles as lead artist, with selected chart positions and certifications, showing year released and album name
Title	Year	Peak chart positions										Certifications	Album
Title	Year	US	US R&B/HH	US Rap	AUS	CAN	FRA	IRE	NZ	UK	WW	Certifications	Album
"All Stars" (featuring Joe Moses)	2011	—	—	—	—	—	—	—	—	—	—		House on the Hill
"F Y'all" (with YG)	2011	—	—	—	—	—	—	—	—	—	—		House on the Hill
"My Cabana" (featuring Young Jeezy)	2013	—	—	—	—	—	—	—	—	—	—		Beach House 2
"Irie" (featuring Wiz Khalifa)	2013	—	—	—	—	—	—	—	—	—	—		Beach House 2
"Paranoid" (featuring B.o.B)	2013	29	9	—	—	—	—	—	—	—	—	RIAA: 2× Platinum; BPI: Silver; MC: Gold	Beach House EP
"Or Nah" (featuring Wiz Khalifa and DJ Mustard or remix also featuring the Weeknd)	2014	48	12	—	—	78	—	—	—	—	—	RIAA: Diamond; BPI: Platinum; MC: 2× Platinum	Beach House EP
"Paranoid" (Remix) (featuring Trey Songz, French Montana and DJ Mustard)	2014	—	—	—	—	—	—	—	—	—	—		Beach House EP
"Shell Shocked" (with Juicy J and Wiz Khalifa featuring Kill the Noise and Madsonik)	2014	84	26	17	—	—	—	—	—	—	—	RIAA: Platinum	Teenage Mutant Ninja Turtles soundtrack
"Stand For"	2014	—	— (Note: "Stand For" did not enter the Hot R&B/Hip-Hop Songs chart, but peaked at number ten on the Bubbling Under R&B/Hip-Hop Singles chart.)	—	—	—	—	—	—	—	—		Non-album singles
"Drop That Kitty" (featuring Charli XCX and Tinashe)	2015	—	— (Note: "Drop That Kitty" did not enter the Hot R&B/Hip-Hop Songs chart, but peaked at number four on the Bubbling Under R&B/Hip-Hop Singles chart.)	—	—	—	187	—	—	—	—		Non-album singles
"Only Right" (featuring YG, Joe Moses and TeeCee4800)	2015	—	—	—	—	—	—	—	—	—	—		Free TC
"Blasé" (featuring Future and Rae Sremmurd)	2015	63	20	15	—	—	—	—	—	—	—	RIAA: 2× Platinum; MC: Gold	Free TC
"Saved" (featuring E-40)	2015	81	25	16	—	—	—	—	—	—	—	RIAA: Platinum; MC: Gold	Free TC
"Wavy" (featuring Joe Moses)	2016	—	— (Note: "Wavy" did not enter the Hot R&B/Hip-Hop Songs chart, but peaked at number three on the Bubbling Under R&B/Hip-Hop Singles chart.)	—	97	—	—	—	—	—	—	RIAA: Platinum; BPI: Silver; MC: Gold	Free TC
"Sucker for Pain" (with Lil Wayne, Wiz Khalifa, Imagine Dragons and Logic featuring X Ambassadors)	2016	15	3	1	7	19	18	18	5	11	—	RIAA: 3× Platinum; BPI: Silver	Suicide Squad: The Album
"Campaign" (featuring Future)	2016	—	— (Note: "Campaign" did not enter the Hot R&B/Hip-Hop Songs chart, but peaked at number three on the Bubbling Under R&B/Hip-Hop Singles chart.)	—	—	—	—	—	—	—	—		Campaign
"No Justice" (featuring Big TC)	2016	—	—	—	—	—	—	—	—	—	—		Campaign
"Zaddy"	2016	—	— (Note: "Zaddy" did not enter the Hot R&B/Hip-Hop Songs chart, but peaked at number eight on the Bubbling Under R&B/Hip-Hop Singles chart.)	—	—	—	—	—	—	—	—		Campaign
"Love U Better" (featuring Lil Wayne and The-Dream)	2017	— (Note: "Love U Better" did not enter the Billboard Hot 100, but peaked at number 12 on the Bubbling Under Hot 100 Singles chart.)	— (Note: "Love U Better" did not enter the Hot R&B/Hip-Hop Songs chart, but peaked at number one on the Bubbling Under R&B/Hip-Hop Singles chart.)	—	97	—	—	—	—	—	—	RIAA: Gold	Beach House 3
"So Am I" (featuring Damian Marley and Skrillex)	2017	—	—	—	—	—	—	—	— (Note: "So Am I" did not enter the NZ Top 40 Singles Chart, but peaked at number 6 on the NZ Heatseakers Chart.)	—	—		Beach House 3
"Ex" (featuring YG)	2017	—	— (Note: "Ex" did not enter the Hot R&B/Hip-Hop Songs chart, but peaked at number eight on the Bubbling Under R&B/Hip-Hop Singles chart.)	—	—	—	—	—	—	—	—	RIAA: Gold	Beach House 3
"Pineapple" (featuring Gucci Mane and Quavo)	2018	— (Note: "Pineapple" did not enter the Billboard Hot 100, but peaked at number 18 on the Bubbling Under Hot 100 Singles chart.)	—	—	—	91	—	—	—	—	—	RIAA: Gold	Beach House 3
"OTW" (Note: The song is only included on the vinyl edition of the EP.) (with Khalid and 6lack)	2018	57	35	—	27	42	—	57	11	60	—	RIAA: 2× Platinum; ARIA: 2× Platinum; BPI: Gold; MC: 2× Platinum	Suncity
"The Light" (with Jeremih as MihTy)	2018	—	—	—	—	—	—	—	—	—	—	RIAA: Gold	MihTy
"Goin Thru Some Thangz" (with Jeremih as MihTy)	2018	—	—	—	—	—	—	—	—	—	—		MihTy
"Purple Emoji" (featuring J. Cole)	2019	— (Note: "Purple Emoji" did not enter the Billboard Hot 100, but peaked at number 11 on the Bubbling Under Hot 100 chart.)	—	—	—	—	—	—	—	—	—	RIAA: Gold	Non-album single
"Look What I've Become" (with Mike Posner)	2019	—	—	—	—	—	—	—	—	—	—		Keep Going
"Two Nights Part II" (Remix) (with Lykke Li and Skrillex)	2019	—	—	—	—	—	—	—	—	—	—		Still Sad Still Sexy
"Hottest in the City"	2019	—	—	—	—	—	—	—	—	—	—		Non-album single
"Treehouse" (with James Arthur and Shotty Horroh)	2019	—	—	—	—	—	—	—	—	— (Note: "Treehouse" did not enter the UK Singles Chart, but peaked at number 54 on the UK Downloads Chart.)	—		You
"Midnight Hour" (with Skrillex and Boys Noize)	2019	—	—	—	—	—	—	—	— (Note: "Midnight Hour" did not enter the NZ Top 40 Singles Chart, but peaked at number 37 on the NZ Hot Singles Chart.)	—	—		Non-album single
"Ego Death" (featuring Kanye West, FKA Twigs and Skrillex)	2020	— (Note: "Ego Death" did not enter the Billboard Hot 100, but peaked at number 7 on the Bubbling Under Hot 100 Singles chart.)	—	—	68	69	—	41	— (Note: "Ego Death" did not enter the NZ Top 40 Singles Chart, but peaked at number 33 on the NZ Hot Singles Chart.)	34	—	BPI: Silver	Featuring Ty Dolla Sign
"Expensive" (featuring Nicki Minaj)	2020	83	27	—	—	—	—	— (Note: "Expensive" did not enter the NZ Top 40 Singles Chart, but peaked at number 19 on the NZ Hot Singles Chart.)	—	—	—		Featuring Ty Dolla Sign
"Spicy" (featuring Post Malone)	2020	53	18	17	68	29	—	—	—	71	—		Featuring Ty Dolla Sign
"The Business, Part II" (with Tiësto)	2021	—	—	—	—	—	—	—	— (Note: "The Business, Part II" did not enter the NZ Top 40 Singles Chart, but peaked at number 33 on the NZ Hot Singles Chart.)	—	—		Non-album single
"By Yourself" (featuring Jhené Aiko and Mustard)	2021	— (Note: "By Yourself" did not enter the Billboard Hot 100, but peaked at number 16 on the Bubbling Under Hot 100 Singles chart.)	—	—	—	—	—	—	— (Note: "By Yourself" did not enter the NZ Top 40 Singles Chart, but peaked at number 30 on the NZ Hot Singles Chart.)	—	—		Featuring Ty Dolla Sign
"Do You Believe" (with Ali Gatie and Marshmello)	2021	—	—	—	—	—	—	—	—	—	—		The Idea of Her
"I Won" (with Jack Harlow and 24kGoldn)	2021	—	—	—	—	—	—	—	—	—	—		F9: The Fast Saga (Original Motion Picture Soundtrack)
"Too Much To Ask" (with Don Diablo)	2021	—	—	—	—	—	—	—	—	—	—		Forever
"I Believed It" (with Dvsn featuring Mac Miller)	2021	—	—	—	—	97	—	—	—	—	—		Cheers to the Best Memories
"Memories" (with Dvsn)	2021	—	—	—	—	―	—	—	—	—	—		Cheers to the Best Memories
"Late to the Party" (with Joyner Lucas)	2021	—	—	—	—	―	—	—	—	—	—		Non-album single
"Willing to Trust" (with Kid Cudi)	2022	—	—	—	—	―	—	—	— (Note: "Willing to Trust" did not enter the NZ Top 40 Singles Chart, but peaked at number 27 on the NZ Hot Singles Chart.)	—	—		Entergalactic
"Champions" (with Wiz Khalifa)	2022	—	—	—	—	―	—	—	—	—	—		Madden NFL 23
"My Friends" (with Mustard featuring Lil Durk)	2022	—	—	—	—	―	—	—	—	—	—		Non-album single
"She Know" (with Lil Pump)	2022	—	—	—	—	―	—	—	—	—	—		Lil Pump 2
"Caught a Body" (with Alesso)	2023	—	—	—	—	―	—	—	—	—	—		Non-album singles
"Motion" (solo or featuring Chris Brown)	2023	—	—	—	—	―	—	—	—	—	—		Non-album singles
"Vultures" (with Kanye West as ¥$ featuring Bump J and Lil Durk)	2023	34	15	11	95	24	—	—	39	— (Note: "Vultures" did not enter the UK Singles Chart, as chart rules only allow three songs per artist to chart within the top one hundred at a time, but peaked at number 50 on the UK Streaming Chart.)	27		Vultures 1
"Talking / Once Again" (with Kanye West as ¥$ featuring North West)	2024	30	12	9	66	30	—	—	32	— (Note: "Talking" did not enter the UK Singles Chart, as chart rules only allow three songs per artist to chart within the top one hundred at a time, but peaked at number 83 on the UK Streaming Chart.)	18		Vultures 1
"Carnival" (with Kanye West as ¥$ and Rich the Kid featuring Playboi Carti)	2024	1	1	1	10	2	119	6	7	5	2	RIAA: 2× Platinum; BPI: Gold; RMNZ: Platinum	Vultures 1
"Slide" (with Kanye West as ¥$)	2024	88	25	22	—	84	—	—	— (Note: "Slide" did not enter the NZ Top 40 Singles Chart, but peaked at number four on the NZ Hot Singles Chart.)	92	154		Vultures 2
"Wheels Fall Off" (featuring Kanye West)	2025	—	—	—	—	—	—	—	— (Note: "Wheels Fall Off" did not enter the NZ Top 40 Singles Chart, but peaked at number 14 on the NZ Hot Singles Chart.)	—	—		Non-album single
"All In"	2025	—	—	—	—	—	—	—	—	—	—		Tycoon
"Smile Body Pretty Face" (featuring Kodak Black and YG)	2025	—	—	—	—	—	—	—	—	—	—		Tycoon
"Show Me Love" (featuring Tory Lanez)	2025	—	—	—	—	—	—	—	—	—	—		Tycoon
"Miss U 2" (with Leon Thomas)	2026	—	—	—	—	—	—	—	— (Note: "Miss U 2" did not enter the NZ Top 40 Singles Chart, but peaked at number 32 on the NZ Hot Singles Chart.)	—	—		Girl Music Vol. 1
"Intention" (with Brandy)	2026	—	—	—	—	—	—	—	—	—	—		Girl Music Vol. 1
"—" denotes a recording that did not chart or was not released in that territory.

=== As featured artist ===
List of singles as featured artist, with selected chart positions, showing year released and album name
Title	Year	Peak chart positions										Certifications	Album
Title	Year	US	US R&B/HH	US Rap	AUS	CAN	FRA	IRE	NZ	UK	WW	Certifications	Album
"Toot It and Boot It" (YG featuring Ty Dolla Sign)	2010	67	60	12	—	—	—	—	—	—	—	RIAA: Platinum	The Real 4Fingaz
"Double Dip" (Problem featuring Ty Dolla Sign)	2011	—	—	—	—	—	—	—	—	—	—		Hotels
"Nobody" (DJ Quik featuring Suga Free and Ty Dolla Sign)	2011	—	—	—	—	—	—	—	—	—	—		The Book of David
"Everything 100" (Bone Thugs-N-Harmony featuring Ty Dolla Sign)	2013	—	—	—	—	—	—	—	—	—	—		Non-album singles
"My Baby" (Remix) (Zendaya featuring Ty Dolla Sign, Bobby Brackins and Iamsu!)	2014	—	—	—	—	—	—	—	—	—	—		Non-album singles
"Unfuck You" (Lyrica Anderson featuring Ty Dolla Sign)	2014	—	—	—	—	—	—	—	—	—	—		King Me 2
"9 Lives" (Eric Bellinger featuring Too Short and Ty Dolla Sign)	2014	—	—	—	—	—	—	—	—	—	—		The Rebirth
"Down on Me" (DJ Mustard featuring Ty Dolla Sign and 2 Chainz)	2014	—	—	—	—	—	—	—	—	—	—		10 Summers
"Next to It" (Lupe Fiasco featuring Ty Dolla Sign)	2014	—	— (Note: "Next to It" did not enter the Hot R&B/Hip-Hop Songs chart, but peaked at number two on the Bubbling Under R&B/Hip-Hop Singles chart.)	—	—	—	—	—	—	—	—		Non-album single
"You and Your Friends" (Wiz Khalifa featuring Snoop Dogg and Ty Dolla Sign)	2014	82	21	19	—	—	—	—	—	—	—	RIAA: Gold	Blacc Hollywood
"Always Into Something" (Stalley featuring Ty Dolla Sign)	2014	—	—	—	—	—	—	—	—	—	—		Ohio
"Made in China" (Victoria Monet featuring Ty Dolla Sign)	2014	—	—	—	—	—	—	—	—	—	—		Nightmares & Lullabies: Act 1
"My Main" (Mila J featuring Ty Dolla Sign)	2014	—	— (Note: "My Main" did not enter the Hot R&B/Hip-Hop Songs chart, but peaked at number three on the Bubbling Under R&B/Hip-Hop Singles chart.)	—	—	—	—	—	—	—	—		M.I.L.A.
"Childish" (Vell featuring Ty Dolla Sign)	2014	—	—	—	—	—	—	—	—	—	—		Stay Down to Come Up
"Pull Up" (Jermaine Dupri featuring Ty Dolla Sign and Migos)	2014	—	—	—	—	—	—	—	—	—	—		Non-album single
"Twerk It" (Project Pat featuring Wiz Khalifa, Ty Dolla Sign and Wale)	2015	—	—	—	—	—	—	—	—	—	—		Mista Don't Play 2: Everythangs Money
"Do Ya" (DaBoyDame featuring Ty Dolla Sign, Adrian Marcel and Eric Bellinger)	2015	—	—	—	—	—	—	—	—	—	—		Non-album single
"Can't Fade Us" (King Los featuring Ty Dolla Sign)	2015	—	—	—	—	—	—	—	—	—	—		GodMoneyWar
"Nobody Has to Know" (Kranium featuring Ty Dolla Sign)	2015	—	—	—	—	—	—	—	—	—	—		Rumors
"100" (Travis Barker featuring Kid Ink, Ty Dolla Sign, Iamsu! and Tyga)	2015	—	—	—	—	—	—	—	—	—	—		Non-album singles
"I Know How It Feel" (Ace Hood featuring Ty Dolla Sign)	2015	—	—	—	—	—	—	—	—	—	—		Non-album singles
"We Don't" (N.O.R.E. featuring Rick Ross, Ty Dolla Sign and City Boy Dee)	2015	—	—	—	—	—	—	—	—	—	—		Non-album singles
"Fakin" (Diggy Simmons featuring Ty Dolla Sign and Omarion)	2015	—	—	—	—	—	—	—	—	—	—		Non-album singles
"What Are We Doing" (Race Banyon featuring Ty Dolla Sign)	2015	—	—	—	—	—	—	—	—	—	—		Non-album singles
"Play No Games" (Big Sean featuring Chris Brown and Ty Dolla Sign)	2015	84	28	21	—	—	—	—	—	—	—	RIAA: Platinum	Dark Sky Paradise
"Real Friends" (Kanye West featuring Ty Dolla Sign)	2016	92	34	25	—	—	—	—	—	78	—	RIAA: Platinum; BPI: Silver	The Life of Pablo
"She Don't" (Ella Mai featuring Ty Dolla Sign)	2016	—	—	—	—	—	—	—	—	—	—	RIAA: Gold	Time
"Work from Home" (Fifth Harmony featuring Ty Dolla Sign)	2016	4	—	—	3	4	17	3	1	2	—	RIAA: 5× Platinum; ARIA: 6× Platinum; MC: 5× Platinum; SNEP: Diamond; RMNZ: 2× Platinum; BPI: 3× Platinum	7/27
"She Just Wanna" (Lil Durk featuring Ty Dolla Sign)	2016	—	—	—	—	—	—	—	—	—	—		LilDurk2X
"Boom" (Major Lazer and MOTi featuring Ty Dolla Sign, WizKid and Kranium)	2016	—	—	—	—	—	—	—	—	—	—		Peace Is the Mission
"Bacon" (Nick Jonas featuring Ty Dolla Sign)	2016	— (Note: "Bacon" did not enter the Billboard Hot 100, but peaked at number 20 on the Bubbling Under Hot 100 Singles chart.)	—	—	—	—	—	—	—	—	—		Last Year Was Complicated
"Gone" (Afrojack featuring Ty Dolla Sign)	2016	—	—	—	—	—	—	—	—	—	—		Non-album singles
"Circles" (Pusha T featuring Ty Dolla Sign and Desiigner)	2016	—	—	—	—	—	—	—	—	—	—		Non-album singles
"4 Lit" (B.o.B featuring T.I. and Ty Dolla Sign)	2016	—	—	—	—	—	—	—	—	—	—		Ether
"Money Showers" (Fat Joe and Remy Ma featuring Ty Dolla Sign)	2016	— (Note: "Money Showers" did not enter the Billboard Hot 100, but peaked at number 10 on the Bubbling Under Hot 100 Singles chart.)	46	—	—	—	—	—	—	—	—		Plata O Plomo
"In My Foreign" (The Americanos featuring Ty Dolla Sign, Lil Yachty, Nicky Jam and French Montana)	2016	—	—	—	—	—	—	—	—	—	—		xXx: Return of Xander Cage (Music from the Motion Picture)
"So Good" (Zara Larsson featuring Ty Dolla Sign)	2017	—	—	—	59	—	160	91	— (Note: "So Good" did not enter the NZ Top 40 Singles Chart, but peaked at number 2 on the NZ Heatseakers Chart.)	44	—	ARIA: Gold; MC: Gold	So Good
"Blessings" (Lecrae featuring Ty Dolla Sign)	2017	— (Note: "Blessings" did not enter the Billboard Hot 100, but peaked at number 25 on the Bubbling Under Hot 100 Singles chart.)	— (Note: "Blessings" did not enter the Billboard Hot R&B/Hip-Hop Songs chart, but peaked at number five on the Bubbling Under R&B/Hip-Hop Singles chart.)	—	—	—	—	—	—	—	—	RIAA: Gold	All Things Work Together
"I Think She Like Me" (Rick Ross featuring Ty Dolla Sign)	2017	—	— (Note: "I Think She Like Me" did not enter the Billboard Hot R&B/Hip-Hop Songs chart, but peaked at number eight on the Bubbling Under R&B/Hip-Hop Singles chart.)	—	—	—	—	—	—	—	—		Rather You Than Me
"Fallen" (Sevyn Streeter featuring Ty Dolla Sign and Cam Wallace)	2017	—	—	—	—	—	—	—	—	—	—		Girl Disrupted
"Ain't Nothing" (Juicy J featuring Wiz Khalifa and Ty Dolla Sign)	2017	— (Note: "Ain't Nothing" did not enter the Billboard Hot 100, but peaked at number 24 on the Bubbling Under Hot 100 Singles chart.)	— (Note: "Ain't Nothing" did not enter the Billboard Hot R&B/Hip-Hop Songs chart, but peaked at number two on the Bubbling Under R&B/Hip-Hop Singles chart.)	—	—	—	—	—	—	—	—		Rubba Band Business
"Sit Down" (Kent Jones featuring Ty Dolla Sign, Lil Dicky and E-40)	2017	—	—	—	—	—	—	—	—	—	—		Too Much Too Soon
"Swalla" (Jason Derulo featuring Nicki Minaj and Ty Dolla Sign)	2017	29	—	—	17	15	6	9	7	6	—	RIAA: 2× Platinum; ARIA: 3× Platinum; MC: 4× Platinum; SNEP: Diamond; RMNZ: 4× Platinum; BPI: 2× Platinum	Nu King
"It's a Vibe" (2 Chainz featuring Ty Dolla Sign, Trey Songz and Jhené Aiko)	2017	44	20	13	—	81	—	—	—	—	—	RIAA: 4× Platinum; MC: 3× Platinum; BPI: Silver	Pretty Girls Like Trap Music
"H.O.E. (Heaven On Earth)" (LunchMoney Lewis featuring Ty Dolla Sign)	2017	—	—	—	—	—	—	—	—	—	—		Non-album singles
"Vitamin D" (Ludacris featuring Ty Dolla Sign)	2017	—	—	—	—	—	—	—	—	—	—		Non-album singles
"F with U" (Kid Ink featuring Ty Dolla Sign)	2017	—	— (Note: "F With U" did not enter the Billboard Hot R&B/Hip-Hop Songs chart, but peaked at number nine on the Bubbling Under R&B/Hip-Hop Singles chart.)	—	—	—	—	—	—	52	—		7 Series
"Whatever You Need" (Meek Mill featuring Chris Brown and Ty Dolla Sign)	2017	51	20	—	—	—	—	—	— (Note: "Whatever You Need" did not enter the NZ Top 40 Singles Chart, but peaked at number 10 on the NZ Heatseakers Chart.)	—	—	RIAA: Platinum	Wins & Losses
"Something New" (Wiz Khalifa featuring Ty Dolla Sign)	2017	92	37	—	—	94	—	—	—	—	—	RIAA: Platinum	Rolling Papers 2
"Leg Over" (Remix) (Mr Eazi and Major Lazer featuring French Montana and Ty Dolla Sign)	2017	—	—	—	—	—	—	—	—	—	—		Non-album singles
"Say Less" (Ashanti featuring Ty Dolla Sign)	2017	—	—	—	—	—	—	—	—	—	—		Non-album singles
"Better On Me" (Pitbull featuring Ty Dolla Sign)	2017	—	—	—	—	—	—	—	—	—	—		Climate Change
"Psycho" (Post Malone featuring Ty Dolla Sign)	2018	1	1	1	1	1	39	2	2	4	—	RIAA: Diamond; ARIA: 9× Platinum; MC: Diamond; RMNZ: Platinum; BPI: 2× Platinum	Beerbongs & Bentleys
"Me So Bad" (Tinashe featuring Ty Dolla Sign and French Montana)	2018	—	— (Note: "Me So Bad" did not enter the Billboard Hot R&B/Hip-Hop Songs chart, but peaked at number 19 on the Ditigal R&b/Hip-Hop Song Sales chart.)	—	108	—	—	—	—	—	—		Joyride
"Off Guard" (Elvana Gjata featuring Ty Dolla Sign)	2018	—	—	—	—	—	—	—	—	—	—		Non-album single
"Trust Me" (Bhad Bhabie featuring Ty Dolla Sign)	2018	—	— (Note: "Trust Me" did not enter the Hot R&B/Hip-Hop Songs chart, but peaked at number nine on the Bubbling Under R&B/Hip-Hop Singles chart.)	—	—	—	—	—	—	—	—		15
"Accelerate" (Christina Aguilera featuring Ty Dolla Sign and 2 Chainz)	2018	—	—	—	—	—	157	—	—	—	—		Liberation
"Ooh Yeah" (Fabolous featuring Ty Dolla Sign)	2018	—	—	—	—	—	—	—	—	—	—		Summertime Shootout 3
"Ain't My Girlfriend" (Too $hort featuring Ty Dolla Sign, Jeremih, French Montana and Joyner Lucas)	2018	—	—	—	—	—	—	—	—	—	—		The Pimp Tape
"Bottled Up" (Dinah Jane featuring Ty Dolla Sign and Marc E. Bassy)	2018	—	—	—	—	—	—	—	—	—	—		Non-album single
"Shootin Shots" (Trey Songz featuring Ty Dolla Sign)	2018	—	—	—	—	—	—	—	—	—	—		11
"Girl's Best Friend" (2 Chainz featuring Ty Dolla Sign)	2018	—	—	—	—	—	—	—	—	—	—		Rap or Go to the League
"Nights Like This" (Kehlani featuring Ty Dolla Sign)	2019	67	32	—	41	61	—	27	28	25	—	RIAA: 3× Platinum; BPI: Platinum	While We Wait
"Pull Up" (Lil Duval featuring Ty Dolla Sign)	2019	—	—	—	—	—	—	—	—	—	—		Non-album single
"Think About Us" (Little Mix featuring Ty Dolla Sign)	2019	—	—	—	—	—	—	36	—	22	—	BPI: Gold	LM5
"Remember" (Katie featuring Ty Dolla Sign)	2019	—	—	—	—	—	—	—	—	—	—		Log
"Do You Mean" (The Chainsmokers featuring Ty Dolla Sign and Bülow)	2019	—	—	—	—	—	—	—	—	—	—		World War Joy
"Got Me" (Dreamville featuring Ari Lennox, Omen, Ty Dolla $ign and Dreezy)	2019	—	—	—	—	—	—	—	—	—	—	RIAA: Gold	Revenge of the Dreamers III
"Receipts" (Serpentwithfeet featuring Ty Dolla Sign)	2019	—	—	—	—	—	—	—	—	—	—		Non-album singles
"Hot Girl Summer" (Megan Thee Stallion featuring Nicki Minaj and Ty Dolla Sign)	2019	11	7	5	64	38	—	51	—	40	—	RIAA: 2× Platinum	Non-album singles
"Malokera" (MC Lan, Skrillex and TroyBoi featuring Ludmilla and Ty Dolla Sign)	2019	—	—	—	—	—	—	—	—	—	—		Non-album singles
"Ay Ya Ya Ya" (Yella Beezy featuring Ty Dolla Sign)	2019	—	—	—	—	—	—	—	—	—	—		Non-album singles
"Excited" (Ant Clemons featuring Ty Dolla Sign)	2019	—	—	—	—	—	—	—	—	—	—		Happy 2 Be Here
"All I Need" (Jacob Collier featuring Mahalia and Ty Dolla Sign)	2020	—	—	—	—	—	—	—	—	—	—		Djesse Vol. 3
"Yacht Club" (Strick featuring Young Thug and Ty Dolla Sign)	2020	—	—	—	—	—	—	—	—	—	—		Non-album singles
"Hit Different" (SZA featuring Ty Dolla Sign)	2020	29	12	—	84	55	—	—	—	55	36	RIAA: 3× Platinum; BPI: Silver	Non-album singles
"And You Know That" (Warren G featuring Ty Dolla Sign)	2020	—	—	—	—	—	—	—	—	—	—		Non-album singles
"No Tomorrow (Pt.2)" (Brandy featuring Ty Dolla Sign)	2020	—	—	—	—	—	—	—	—	—	—		Non-album singles
"Oops (I'm Sorry)" (Lost Kings featuring Ty Dolla Sign and Gashi)	2020	—	—	—	—	—	—	—	—	—	—		It's Not You, It's Me
"Gotta Love It" (Symba featuring Ty Dolla $ign)	2020	—	—	—	—	—	—	—	—	—	—		Don't Run from R.A.P.
"Chosen" (Blxst and Tyga featuring Ty Dolla Sign)	2021	51	11	6	—	94	—	76	29	42	101	RIAA: Platinum; ARIA: 2× Platinum; MC: Platinum; RMNZ: Platinum; BPI: Gold	No Love Lost
"WusYaName" (Tyler the Creator featuring YoungBoy Never Broke Again and Ty Dolla Sign)	2021	14	6	3	22	22	—	24	14	25	19	RIAA: 2× Platinum; MC: Gold; BPI: Silver	Call Me If You Get Lost
"Lifetime" (Swedish House Mafia featuring Ty Dolla Sign and 070 Shake)	2021	—	—	—	—	—	—	—	—	—	—		Paradise Again
"Only Fanz" (Sean Paul featuring Ty Dolla Sign)	2021	—	—	—	—	—	—	—	—	—	—		Scorcha
"Family" (David Guetta featuring Bebe Rexha, Ty Dolla Sign and A Boogie wit da Hoodie)	2021	—	—	—	—	—	—	—	—	—	—		Non-album singles
"OT" (Capella Grey featuring Ty Dolla Sign)	2022	—	—	—	—	—	—	—	—	—	—		Non-album singles
"Friends" (Monica featuring Ty Dolla Sign)	2022	—	—	—	—	—	—	—	—	—	—		Non-album singles
"Vibe Like This" (SG Lewis featuring Ty Dolla Sign & Lucky Daye)	2022	—	—	—	—	—	—	—	—	—	—		AudioLust & HigherLove
"Feel It Inside" (Yung Bleu featuring Ty Dolla Sign)	2023	—	—	—	—	—	—	—	—	—	—		Tantra
"Ring Ring" (Chase B featuring Travis Scott, Don Toliver, Quavo, and Ty Dolla Sign)	2023	—	—	—	—	—	—	—	—	—	—		Non-album singles
"Stupid Dumb" (Mabel featuring Ty Dolla Sign)	2024	—	—	—	—	—	—	—	—	—	—		Non-album singles
"Location" (Zerb & Wiz Khalifa featuring Ty Dolla Sign)	2025	— (Note: "Location" did not enter the Billboard Hot 100 Chart, but peaked at number 15 on the Hot Dance/Electronic Songs.)	—	—	—	—	—	—	—	—	—		TBA
"—" denotes a recording that did not chart or was not released.

=== Promotional singles ===
List of singles, with selected chart positions, showing year released and album name
Title	Year	Certifications	Album
"When I See Ya" (featuring Fetty Wap )	2015		Free TC
"Solid" (featuring Babyface)	2015		Free TC
"Blasé" (Remix 1) (featuring Future, Young Jeezy, Juicy J and Diddy)	2015		Non-album singles
"Blasé" (Remix 2) (featuring Future, T.I., French Montana and ASAP Ferg)	2015		Non-album singles
"3 Wayz" (featuring Travis Scott)	2016		Campaign
"Stealing"	2016		Campaign
"Back Up" (featuring 24hrs)	2016		Non-album single
"Dawsin's Breek" (featuring Jeremih)	2017		Beach House 3
"Message in a Bottle"	2017		Beach House 3
"Don't Judge Me" (featuring Future and Swae Lee)	2017		Beach House 3
"Dawsin's Breek" (Remix) (featuring ASAP Rocky)	2017		Non-album single
"Clout" (featuring 21 Savage)	2018	RIAA: Gold	Beach House 3 (Deluxe)
"Spicy" (Remix) (featuring Post Malone, J Balvin, YG and Tyga)	2020		Non-album single

== Other charted and certified songs ==
List of other songs, with selected chart positions, showing year charted and album name
Title	Year	Peak chart positions										Certifications	Album
Title	Year	US	US R&B/HH	US Rap	AUS	CAN	FRA	IRE	NZ	UK	WW	Certifications	Album
"In My Room" (Yellow Claw and Mustard featuring Ty Dolla Sign and Tyga)	2015	—	—	—	—	—	—	—	—	—	—	RIAA: Gold	Blood for Mercy
"Impatient" (Jeremih featuring Ty Dolla Sign)	2015	—	—	—	—	—	—	—	—	—	—	RIAA: 2× Platinum; BPI: Silver	Late Nights
"Jam" (Kevin Gates featuring Trey Songz, Ty Dolla Sign, and Jamie Foxx)	2016	97	29	17	—	—	—	—	—	—	—		Islah
"Liquor Locker" (Vic Mensa featuring Ty Dolla Sign)	2016	—	—	—	—	—	—	—	—	—	—	RIAA: Gold	There's Alot Going On
"Cinderella" (Mac Miller featuring Ty Dolla Sign)	2016	25	6	3	16	29	—	42	7	21	47	RIAA: Platinum; BPI: Silver	The Divine Feminine
"Famous"	2017	—	—	—	—	—	—	—	—	—	—		Beach House 3
"In Your Phone" (with Lauren Jauregui)	2017	—	18	—	—	—	—	—	—	—	—		Beach House 3
"Darkside" (with Future featuring Kiiara)	2017	— (Note: "Darkside" did not enter the Billboard Hot 100, but peaked at number 22 on the Bubbling Under Hot 100 Singles chart.)	—	—	—	—	—	—	—	—	—		Bright: The Album
"White Sand" (Migos featuring Travis Scott, Ty Dolla Sign, and Big Sean)	2018	64	31	—	—	—	—	—	—	—	—		Culture II
"After Dark" (Drake featuring Static Major and Ty Dolla Sign)	2018	41	28	—	—	—	—	—	—	—	—	ARIA: Gold	Scorpion
"The Other Side" (with Max)	2018	—	—	—	—	—	—	—	—	84	—		The Greatest Showman: Reimagined
"Lies" (Schoolboy Q featuring Ty Dolla Sign and YG)	2019	—	—	—	—	—	—	—	— (Note: "Lies" did not enter the NZ Top 40 Singles Chart, but peaked at number 14 on the NZ Hot Singles Chart.)	—	—		Crash Talk
"Bacc Seat" (Roddy Ricch featuring Ty Dolla Sign)	2019	— (Note: "Bacc Seat" did not enter the Billboard Hot 100, but peaked at number two on the Bubbling Under Hot 100 Singles chart.)	—	—	—	—	—	—	—	—	—	RIAA: Platinum; BPI: Silver	Please Excuse Me for Being Antisocial
"Body Language" (Big Sean featuring Ty Dolla Sign and Jhené Aiko)	2020	95	—	—	—	—	—	—	—	—	—		Detroit 2
"Safety Net" (Ariana Grande featuring Ty Dolla Sign)	2020	52	—	—	—	—	—	—	—	— (Note: "Safety Net" did not enter the UK Singles Chart, but peaked at number 96 on the UK Singles Downloads Chart.)	—	ARIA: Gold; BPI: Silver	Positions
"Get Along Better" (Drake featuring Ty Dolla Sign)	2021	27	19	—	—	—	—	—	—	— (Note: "Get Along Better" did not enter the UK Singles Chart, as chart rules only allow three songs per artist to chart within the top one hundred at a time, but peaked at number 40 on the UK Streaming Chart.)	—	BPI: Silver	Certified Lover Boy
"Stars" (with Kanye West as ¥$)	2024	39	17	12	34	29	158	—	30	— (Note: "Stars" did not enter the UK Singles Chart, as chart rules only allow three songs per artist to chart within the top one hundred at a time, but peaked at number 44 on the UK Streaming Chart.)	26		Vultures 1
"Keys to My Life" (with Kanye West as ¥$)	2024	55	25	20	59	42	—	—	—	— (Note: "Keys to My Life" did not enter the UK Singles Chart, as chart rules only allow three songs per artist to chart within the top one hundred at a time, but peaked at number 68 on the UK Streaming Chart.)	48		Vultures 1
"Paid" (with Kanye West as ¥$)	2024	53	23	18	44	38	182	—	—	— (Note: "Paid" did not enter the UK Singles Chart, as chart rules only allow three songs per artist to chart within the top one hundred at a time, but peaked at number 53 on the UK Streaming Chart.)	42		Vultures 1
"Back to Me" (with Kanye West as ¥$)	2024	26	11	8	27	22	—	21	19	18	16		Vultures 1
"Hoodrat" (with Kanye West as ¥$)	2024	67	31	25	88	57	—	—	—	—	81		Vultures 1
"Do It" (with Kanye West as ¥$)	2024	52	22	17	52	37	—	—	—	— (Note: "Do It" did not enter the UK Singles Chart, as chart rules only allow three songs per artist to chart within the top one hundred at a time, but peaked at number 71 on the UK Streaming Chart.)	47		Vultures 1
"Paperwork" (with Kanye West as ¥$)	2024	64	29	24	80	53	—	—	—	— (Note: "Paperwork" did not enter the UK Singles Chart, as chart rules only allow three songs per artist to chart within the top one hundred at a time, but peaked at number 93 on the UK Streaming Chart.)	57		Vultures 1
"Burn" (with Kanye West as ¥$)	2024	33	14	10	24	19	—	22	13	17	21		Vultures 1
"Fuk Sumn" (with Kanye West as ¥$)	2024	23	10	7	33	17	181	—	21	100	13		Vultures 1
"Beg Forgiveness" (with Kanye West as ¥$)	2024	65	30	—	93	54	—	—	—	—	72		Vultures 1
"Good (Don't Die)" (with Kanye West as ¥$)	2024	93	43	—	—	76	—	—	—	—	142		Vultures 1
"Problematic" (with Kanye West as ¥$)	2024	79	37	—	—	60	—	—	—	—	97		Vultures 1
"King" (with Kanye West as ¥$)	2024	94	44	—	—	73	—	—	—	—	154		Vultures 1
"Gracious" (with Future and Metro Boomin)	2024	— (Note: "Gracious" did not enter the Billboard Hot 100, but peaked at number 23 on the Bubbling Under Hot 100 Singles chart.)	—	—	—	—	—	—	—	—	—		We Still Don't Trust You
"Time Moving Slow" (with Kanye West as ¥$ and the Inter Milano Ultras)	2024	— (Note: "Time Moving Slow" did not enter the Billboard Hot 100, but peaked at number 22 on the Bubbling Under Hot 100 chart.)	39	—	—	—	—	—	—	—	—		Vultures 2
"Field Trip" (with Kanye West as ¥$, Playboi Carti, and Don Toliver featuring Kodak Black)	2024	48	10	8	88	41	—	—	— (Note: "Field Trip" did not enter the NZ Top 40 Singles Chart, but peaked at number three on the NZ Hot Singles Chart.)	65	33		Vultures 2
"Fried" (with Kanye West as ¥$)	2024	87	24	21	—	80	—	—	— (Note: "Fried" did not enter the NZ Top 40 Singles Chart, but peaked at number eight on the NZ Hot Singles Chart.)	—	151		Vultures 2
"Promotion" (with Kanye West as ¥$ and Future)	2024	76	21	18	—	73	—	—	— (Note: "Promotion" did not enter the NZ Top 40 Singles Chart, but peaked at number five on the NZ Hot Singles Chart.)	94	138		Vultures 2
"Lifestyle" (with Kanye West as ¥$ and Lil Wayne)	2024	—	41	—	—	—	—	—	—	—	—		Vultures 2
"River" (with Kanye West as ¥$ and Young Thug)	2024	— (Note: "River" did not enter the Billboard Hot 100, but peaked at number 11 on the Bubbling Under Hot 100 chart.)	32	—	—	—	—	—	—	—	—		Vultures 2
"530" (with Kanye West as ¥$)	2024	— (Note: "530" did not enter the Billboard Hot 100, but peaked at number 16 on the Bubbling Under Hot 100 chart.)	37	—	—	—	—	—	—	—	—		Vultures 2
"Dead" (with Kanye West as ¥$, Future and Lil Durk)	2024	— (Note: "Dead" did not enter the Billboard Hot 100, but peaked at number 19 on the Bubbling Under Hot 100 chart.)	38	—	—	—	—	—	—	—	—		Vultures 2
"We Need All Da Vibes" (with Playboi Carti and Young Thug)	2025	71	34	—	—	63	—	—	—	—	74		Music
"Don't Kill the Party" (featuring Quavo and Juicy J)	2025	87	23	15	—	39	—	—	— (Note: "Don't KIll the Party" did not enter the NZ Top 40 Singles Chart, but peaked at number 20 on the NZ Hot Singles Chart.)	—	—		Tycoon
"—" denotes a recording that did not chart or was not released.

== Guest appearances ==
List of non-single guest appearances, with other performing artists, showing year released and album name
Title	Year	Other performer(s)	Album
"U"	2007	Black Milk, Kory	Popular Demand
"And If"	2007	Sa-Ra	The Hollywood Recordings
"Do Me Girl"	2007	Sa-Ra	The Hollywood Recordings
"Soopafly"	2008	Shawn Jackson	First of All...
"Go There With You"	2008	Shawn Jackson	First of All...
"Take Over the World"	2010	Kid Ink	Crash Landing
"Heels & Dresses"	2010	Game, X.O.	Break Lights
"Talk 2 You"	2010	Sean Brown, Kid Ink	The Blind Art Collector
"Reminiscence"	2011	Mann	Mann's World
"Bedroom Bully"	2011	Problem	Hotels
"Love"	2011	Terrace Martin	Locke High 2
"Neva Gon Leave"	2011	Kid Ink	Daydreamer
"The Return"	2012	Pac Div	GMB
"Go So Deep"	2012	YG, PC	4 Hunnid Degreez
"She Don't Love Me"	2012	YG	4 Hunnid Degreez
"10 Toes"	2012	Audio Push	Inland Empire
"Cookies & OG"	2013	Mann	The L.I.S.A. EP
"Chose"	2013	Joe Moses, E-40	From Nothing to Something
"She a Freak"	2013	Joe Moses	From Nothing to Something
"Love Jones"	2013	YG	Just Re'd Up 2
"I'll Do Ya"	2013	YG	Just Re'd Up 2
"4G's"	2013	DJ Mustard, TC4800, E-40, C Hood	Ketchup
"Put This Thang On Ya"	2013	DJ Mustard	Ketchup
"Fuck That Nigga"	2013	DJ Mustard, Teeflii, Constantine, Tory Lanez	Ketchup
"Paranoid"	2013	DJ Mustard, Joe Moses	Ketchup
"Pushin'"	2013	Chanel West Coast	Now You Know
"You're the One"	2013	Terrace Martin, Tone Trezure	3ChordFold
"Smack"	2013	Audio Push, Iamsu!	Come As You Are
"Another Bitch"	2013	Mistah F.A.B.	Hella Ratchet
"Ugh"	2013	Berner, Problem	Drugstore Cowboy
"Rodeo"	2013	Berner, Baby Bash	Drugstore Cowboy
"Same Hoes"	2013	Game, Nipsey Hussle	OKE: Operation Kill Everything
"Don't Judge Me"	2013	Snow Tha Product	Good Nights & Bad Mornings 2: The Hangover
"2morrow (We Ain't Worried)"	2013	Dom Kennedy	Get Home Safely
"Mosh Pit"	2013	Tinie Tempah, Dizzee Rascal	Demonstration
"Chitty Bang"	2013	E-40, Juicy J	The Block Brochure: Welcome to the Soil 4
"All That"	2013	Rockie Fresh, Casey Veggies, Juicy J	Fresh Veggies
"Sorry Momma"	2014	YG	My Krazy Life
"It's My Party"	2014	Icona Pop	none
"Rude" (Remix)	2014	Magic!, Travis Barker, Kid Ink	none
"Banger"	2014	Wiz Khalifa	28 Grams
"They Know"	2014	2 Chainz, Cap. 1	Freebase
"Pass Off"	2014	Smoke DZA, Bluntsmoker	Dream. Zone. Achieve
"Ride" (Remix)	2014	SoMo, K Camp	none
"Snitches"	2014	Lupe Fiasco	none
"Dead Wrong"	2014	Trey Songz	Trigga
"Drunk AF"	2014	B.o.B	No Genre Pt. 2
"Don't Tell 'Em" (Remix)	2014	Jeremih, French Montana	none
"Dangerous"	2014	Kid Ink, Juliann	4B's
"King of the Fall" (Remix)	2014	The Weeknd, Belly	none
"Nobody Else"	2014	Destructo, Warren G	West Coast EP
"Deliver"	2015	Lupe Fiasco	Tetsuo & Youth
"Shoutout My Bitches"	2015	K Camp, Dan Diego	One Way
"Nothin' Like Me"	2015	Chris Brown, Tyga	Fan of a Fan: The Album
"The Summer League"	2015	Wale, Kanye West	none
"Post to Be" (Remix)	2015	Omarion, Dej Loaf, Trey Songz, Rick Ross	none
"Do Betta"	2015	Troy Ave	Major Without a Deal
"Your Money"	2015	RJ, Joe Moses	O.M.M.I.O. 2
"Loving You"	2015	Trey Songz	Trigga Reloaded
"Watch Out"	2015	Fredo Santana, Que	Ain't No Money Like Trap Money (Vol. 1)
"Late Night King"	2015	Trae tha Truth, Jeremih, T.I.	Tha Truth
"The Other Side"	2015	Chinx	Welcome to JFK
"Tryna Fuck"	2015	Juicy J, Drake	none
"Lean On" (Remix)	2015	Major Lazer, DJ Snake, MØ	none
"1 Time"	2015	Snow Tha Product	The Rest Comes Later
"Go Hard or Go Home Part 2"	2015	Wiz Khalifa, Trey Songz, French Montana	none
"LIT"	2015	Joe Moses	Nothing 2 Something 3
"Up on the Wall"	2015	The Game, Problem, YG	The Documentary 2
"My Flag / Da Homies"	2015	The Game, Jay 305, AD, Mitchy Slick, Joe Moses, RJ, Skeme	The Documentary 2
"Routine Rouge"	2015	Rich the Kid, PartyNextDoor	none
"Boom"	2015	Major Lazer, Moti, Wizkid, Kranium	Peace is the Mission
"Can You Feel It"	2015	Carnage, Atmozfears	Papi Gordo
"You Could Be My Lover"	2015	Puff Daddy	MMM
"Anything Goes"	2015	R. Kelly	The Buffet
"One Call Away" (Coast to Coast Remix)	2015	Charlie Puth, Brett Eldridge, Sofia Reyes	none
"Fade"	2016	Kanye West, Post Malone	The Life of Pablo
"Jam"	2016	Kevin Gates, Jamie Foxx, Trey Songz	Islah
"Lit"	2016	Wiz Khalifa	Khalifa
"I Love You"	2016	A$AP Ferg, Chris Brown	Always Strive and Prosper
"Thought It"	2016	Wale, Joe Moses	Summer On Sunset
"Action"	2016	Nef the Pharaoh, Eric Bellinger	Neffy Got Wings
"Gangster"	2016	PJ	Rare
"Cinderella"	2016	Mac Miller	The Divine Feminine
"Been a Long Time"	2016	DJ Mustard, YG	Cold Summer
"Lil Baby"	2016	DJ Mustard	Cold Summer
"What These Bitches Want"	2016	DJ Mustard, Nipsey Hussle, Meek Mill	Cold Summer
"Lil Baby"	2016	2 Chainz	Hibachi for Lunch
"Outkast"	2016	Belly	Inzombia
"Ballerina" (Remix)	2016	Belly	none
"This Big"	2016	DJ SpinKing, 50 Cent, Jeremih	For the Culture
"Hanging Up My Jersey"	2017	PnB Rock	GTTM: Goin Thru the Motions
"Too Many Ways"	2017	Dom Kennedy, Hit-Boy	Courtesy of Half-A-Mil
"Leave Me Alone"	2017	Berner, Styles P, Wiz Khalifa	Vibes
"NGL"	2017	Lupe Fiasco	Drogas Light
"Kill"	2017	Lupe Fiasco, Victoria Monet	Drogas Light
"Bad Bitch"	2017	Bebe Rexha	All Your Fault: Pt. 1
"Better On Me"	2017	Pitbull	Climate Change
"Infinite Stripes"	2017	Cashmere Cat	9
"Rain Come Down"	2017	Vince Staples	Big Fish Theory
"Back Out"	2017	Nef the Pharaoh	The Chang Project
"Anything U Want"	2017	Sevyn Streeter, Jeremih, Wiz Khalifa	Girl Disrupted
"One for Me"	2017	Wizkid	Sounds from the Other Side
"Dirty Wine"	2017	Wizkid	Sounds from the Other Side
"Veggies"	2017	Amine	Good for You
"2 Fine"	2017	T-Pain	Oblivion
"We Could Be Free"	2017	Vic Mensa	The Autobiography
"Put it on Silent"	2017	PartyNextDoor	none
"Go Get Sum Mo"	2017	Young Dolph, Gucci Mane, 2 Chainz	Thinking Out Loud
"Only 4 Me"	2017	Chris Brown, Verse Simmonds	Heartbreak on a Full Moon
"White Sand"	2018	Migos, Travis Scott, Big Sean	Culture II
"The Love"	2018	Smoke DZA	Not for Sale
"Breather"	2018	Lil Durk, PartyNextDoor	Just Cause Y'all Waited
"100 Grand"	2018	Lil Durk, A Boogie wit da Hoodie	Signed to the Streets 3
"Take"	2018	Arin Ray	Platinum Fire
"Play Your Roll"	2018	Berner	The Big Pescado
"Accelerate"	2018	Christina Aguilera, 2 Chainz	Liberation
"Jaded"	2018	Drake	Scorpion
"Take It Away"	2018	RL Grime, TK Kravitz	Nova
"The Other Side"	2018	Max Schneider	The Greatest Showman Reimagined
"Scared of the Dark"	2018	Lil Wayne, XXXTentacion	Spider-Man: Into the Spider-Verse
"Thugz Mansion"	2018	Mozzy, YG	Gangland Landlord
"The Distance"	2018	Mariah Carey	Caution
"Choose Up"	2018	Berner, DJ Quik	RICO
"Benz Boys"	2019	Curren$y, Wiz Khalifa	2009
"Lies"	2019	ScHoolboy Q, YG	CrasH Talk
"Bubble"	2019	24hrs	Valentino Twenty
"4Play"	2019	Jeezy	TM104: The Legend of The Snowman
"Everything We Need"	2019	Kanye West, Ant Clemons	Jesus Is King
"Surface"	2019	Mustard, Ella Mai	Perfect 10
"Best Friend"	2019	Jason Derulo	2Sides (Side 1)
"Bacc Seat"	2019	Roddy Ricch	Please Excuse Me for Being Antisocial
"Like That"	2020	Yo Gotti, A Boogie wit da Hoodie	Untrapped
"NYB (Need Your Best)"	2020	Jadakiss	Ignatius
"Y U Mad"	2020	Wiz Khalifa, Megan Thee Stallion, Mustard	The Saga of Wiz Khalifa
"Don't Stop"	2020	Lil Keed	Trapped on Cleveland 3
"Body Language"	2020	Big Sean, Jhené Aiko	Detroit 2
"Surgery"	2020	YG, Gunna	My Life 4Hunnid
"Head Down"	2020	Berner, B-Real	Los Meros
"On the Wall"	2020	Berner, B-Real	Los Meros
"Safety Net"	2020	Ariana Grande	Positions
"Can't Go for That"	2020	2 Chainz, Lil Duval	So Help Me God!
"She Gone Pop It"	2020	Juicy J, Megan Thee Stallion	The Hustle Continues
"Favorite Bitch"	2020	Eminem	Music to Be Murdered By – Side B
"Still (Family)"	2021	YBN Nahmir	Visionland
"Only Fanz"	2021	Sean Paul	Scorcha
"Quickie"	2021	Hitmaka	Big Tuh
"Junya, Pt. 2"	2021	Kanye West, Playboi Carti	Donda
"Get Along Better"	2021	Drake	Certified Lover Boy
"No More"	2021	G-Eazy	These Things Happen Too
"Striptease"	2021	French Montana, Latto	They Got Amnesia
"Slow It Down"	2021	Roddy Ricch, Alex Isley	Live Life Fast
"No Drama"	2022	Rauw Alejandro	Trap Cake, Vol. 2
"Gimme Your Number"	2022	Anitta	Versions of Me
"Change the Game"	2022	The Game	Drillmatic: Heart vs. Mind
"Splash"	2022	John Legend, Jhené Aiko	Legend
"Can’t Shake Her"	2022	Kid Cudi	Entergalactic
"#1 Freak"	2022	Roddy Ricch	Feed Tha Streets III
"She Know"	2023	Lil Pump	Lil Pump 2
"Waterfalls"	2023	Yung Bleu	Love Scars II
"Mind Your Business (Bosses in Love)"	2023	Diddy, Kehlani	The Love Album: Off the Grid
"Reachin'"	2023	Diddy, Coco Jones	The Love Album: Off the Grid
"Gracious"	2024	Future, Metro Boomin	We Still Don't Trust You
"Cole Pimp"	2024	Denzel Curry, Juicy J	King of the Mischievous South Vol. 2
"A Song for Mom"	2024	Mustard, Charlie Wilson, Masego	Faith of a Mustard Seed
"A Song for Mom"	2024	Mustard, Future, Charlie Wilson	Faith of a Mustard Seed
"Mayday"	2024	Jay Park	The One You Wanted
"Speed"	2025	DDG, Rich The Kid	Blame The Chat
"Leave Me Alone"	2025	Xzibit, Dr. Dre	Kingmaker
"New Sofas"	2025	Joyner Lucas	ADHD 2
"Wholeheartedly"	2025	JID, 6lack	God Does Like Ugly
"Switchblade"	2026	Aespa	Lemonade

== Production discography ==
List of production and songwriting credits (excluding guest appearances, interpolations, and samples)
Track(s)	Year	Credit	Artist(s)	Album
2. "Perskryptshyn"	2007	Producer (as part of Jack Sample Pros)	Jack Sample Pros	Various artists – Producer No. 1 EP01
3. "Soopafly"	2008	Producer (with Chordz)	Shawn Jackson	First of All
4. "Fix Ya Face"	2008	Producer (with Chordz)	Shawn Jackson	First of All
10. "Feelin' Jack"	2008	Producer (with Chordz)	Shawn Jackson	First of All
11. "Countdown"	2008	Producer (with Chordz)	Shawn Jackson	First of All
4. "Toot It and Boot It"	2010	Producer (with Chordz), guest vocals	YG	The Real 4Fingaz
1. "One Night Stand"	2011	Producer	Ty Dolla Sign	Back Up Drive Vol. 1
7. "Sometimes"	2011	Producer	Ty Dolla Sign	Back Up Drive Vol. 1
9. "Low Rida"	2011	Producer	Ty Dolla Sign	Back Up Drive Vol. 1
9. "Double Dip"; (featuring Ty Dolla Sign)	2011	Producer	Problem	Hotels
10. "Good Pussy"; (featuring YG)	2011	Producer	Problem	Hotels
12. "Bedroom Bully"; (featuring Ty Dolla Sign)	2011	Producer	Problem	Hotels
3. "Take It 2 The Back"	2012	Producer	Ty Dolla Sign	Back Up Drive Vol. 2
5. "Pu$$y On Me"	2012	Producer	Ty Dolla Sign	Back Up Drive Vol. 2
13. "Fumble"	2012	Producer	Trey Songz	Chapter V
13. "Time"	2012	Producer	Ty Dolla Sign	Beach House
11. "Steal My Breath Away"	2012	Songwriter	Tulisa	The Female Boss
12. "Kill Me Tonight"	2012	Songwriter	Tulisa	The Female Boss
3. "I Bet"	2013	Producer	Ty Dolla Sign	Beach House 2
4. "1st Night 4 a Young (Remix)"	2013	Producer	Ty Dolla Sign	Beach House 2
9¹. "Dolla $ign"	2013	Producer	Ty Dolla Sign	Beach House 2
9². "My Cabana"	2013	Producer	Ty Dolla Sign	Beach House 2
10. "Float"	2013	Producer	Ty Dolla Sign	Beach House 2
13. "Never Be The Same"	2013	Producer	Ty Dolla Sign	Beach House 2
14. "Rodeo"; (featuring Ty Dolla Sign)	2013	Producer	Berner	Drugstore Cowboy
6. "Don't Judge Me"	2013	Producer	Snow Tha Product	Good Nights & Bad Mornings 2: The Hangover
2. "Young Kings"	2013	Producer	Niko G4	Roll The Dice
8. "Shoppin'"; (featuring Dom Kennedy and Jay 305)	2013	Producer	Niko G4	Roll The Dice
3. "Loyal"; (featuring Lil Wayne and Tyga)	2013	Songwriter	Chris Brown	X
10. "Headband"; (featuring 2 Chainz)	2013	Songwriter	B.o.B	Underground Luxury
9. "Wet"; (featuring YG)	2013	Producer	Joe Moses	From Nothing to Something, Vol. 2
6. "Never Be The Same (Remix)"; (featuring Jay Rock)	2014	Producer	Ty Dolla Sign	Beach House EP
6. "On The Run"	2014	Producer (with Ricky P)	Courtney Noelle	Love On The Run
11. "Eat"; (featuring YG, Tyga and Jazz Lazer)	2014	Producer	Mally Mall	EMPIRE Presents: Triple X Mas
11. "Really Be (Smokin N Drankin)"; (featuring Kendrick Lamar)	2014	Producer (with Terrace Martin and Chordz)	YG	My Krazy Life
3. "Lord Knows"	2014	Producer	Ty Dolla Sign	Sign Language
4. "Stretch/She Better"	2014	Producer	Ty Dolla Sign	Sign Language
5. "Drank N Cranberry"	2014	Producer	Ty Dolla Sign	Sign Language
11. "In Too Deep"	2014	Producer	Ty Dolla Sign	Sign Language
11. "Wake Up"; (featuring Ty Dolla Sign)	2014	Producer	Lil Chuckee	Over Due
2. "Post to Be"; (featuring Chris Brown and Jhené Aiko)	2014	Songwriter	Omarion	Sex Playlist
"Next To It" (featuring Ty Dolla Sign)	2014	Producer (with Shafiq Husayn)	Lupe Fiasco	—N/a
14. "It Ain't You"	2014	Songwriter	Jordin Sparks	Right Here Right Now
12. "Keep Doin' That (Rich Bitch)"; (featuring R. Kelly)	2014	Songwriter	Rick Ross	Hood Billionaire
"FourFiveSeconds"	2015	Songwriter	Rihanna, Kanye West, and Paul McCartney	—N/a
11. "Thug It Out"; (featuring Ty Dolla Sign)	2015	Producer	Chevy Woods	Gang Land 3
5. "1 Time"; (featuring Ty Dolla Sign)	2015	Producer	Snow Tha Product	The Rest Comes Later
4. "Post Up"	2015	Producer	Wiz Khalifa, Ty Dolla Sign	Talk About It In The Morning
13. "IG"	2015	Producer	Joe Moses	Brackin
14. "Still Brazy"	2016	Producer	YG	Still Brazy
1. "Faithful"; (featuring Ty Dolla Sign)	2016	Producer (with Nic Nac)	Bobby Brackins	To Live For
7. "911"; (featuring Ty Dolla Sign)	2016	Producer	Rich the Kid	Trap Talk
9. "Kill"; (featuring Victoria Monét and Ty Dolla Sign)	2017	Producer (with D'Mile)	Lupe Fiasco	Drogas Light
"On My Bumper" (featuring Ty Dolla Sign)	2017	Producer	Joe Moses	—N/a
12. "White Sand"; (featuring Travis Scott and Ty Dolla Sign)	2018	Producer (with Wheezy, Quavo, DJ Durel and Travis Scott)	Migos	Culture II
5. "3Way"	2018	Songwriter	Teyana Taylor	K.T.S.E.
3. "All Mine"	2018	Songwriter, additional vocals	Kanye West	ye
4. "Wouldn't Leave"; (featuring PartyNextDoor)	2018	Co-producer (with Kanye West, Mike Dean, and Noah Goldstein), additional vocals	Kanye West	ye
5. "Violent Crimes"	2018	Songwriter	Kanye West	ye
6. "Chances All"	2018	Songwriter	Koda Kumi	DNA
8. "Switch"	2018	Songwriter	6lack	East Atlanta Love Letter
3. "Boss"	2018	Songwriter, additional vocals	The Carters	Everything Is Love
1. "Feels Like Summer"	2018	Songwriter, additional vocals, "transcriber"	Vince Staples	FM!
5. "Rich and Famous"; (featuring Sean Paul)	2019	Producer (with Gizzle)	Koda Kumi	Re(cord)
"40"	2019	Producer (with Gabe Shaddow)	Joe Trufant	—N/a
6. "Can't Go"; (featuring Ty Dolla Sign)	2020	Producer	UnoTheActivist	8
8. "Mission"	2020	Songwriter, additional vocals	Dave East	Karma 3
24. "Single Again"	2020	Songwriter, additional vocals	Big Sean	Detroit 2
4. "Bad One"	2021	Producer	Marques Houston	ME
16. "No More"; (featuring Ty Dolla Sign)	2021	Producer (with damn james!, Van Zandt, and Blueysport)	G-Eazy	These Things Happen Too
3. "Don't Text Don't Call"	2022	Producer	Snoop Dogg, Wiz Khalifa	An 8th
19. "NRH"	2023	Songwriter	6lack	Since I Have a Lover
"Chucks" (featuring Channel Tres)	2023	Producer (with Terrace Martin)	Terrace Martin	—N/a
"Peace and Love"	2023	Producer	Wiz Khalifa	—N/a
14. "In The Room"	2023	Producer (with TBHits and Pluss)	JID, Tierra Whack, and BJ the Chicago Kid	Creed III: The Soundtrack
—N/a	2023	Executive producer, A&R	Leon Thomas III	Electric Dusk
16. "Reachin'"; (featuring Ty Dolla Sign and Coco Jones)	2023	Producer (with Diddy, Stevie J, Peter Lee Johnson, Roark Bailey, damn james!, Lil Cobaine, and Lil Rod Madeit)	Diddy	The Love Album: Off the Grid
"Lovers or Friends" (with Leon Thomas III)	2025	Producer (with Terrace Martin)	YG	Non-album single
7. "Flowers"	2026	Songwriter	AJ McLean	My Name Is Alexander James
"WE LIKE TO PARTY"	2026	Producer (with Hitmaka and damn james!)	Shoreline Mafia, OhGeesy and Fenix Flexin	TBA
9. "Bully"; (featuring CeeLo Green)	2026	Songwriter	Kanye West	Bully
10. "Highs and Lows"	2026	Songwriter	Kanye West	Bully
17. "Last Breath"; (featuring Peso Pluma)	2026	Songwriter	Kanye West	Bully
6. "On the Low"; (featuring Tyler, the Creator)	2026	Producer	YG	The Gentlemen's Club
8. "Hollywood"; (with Shoreline Mafia)	2026	Producer (with damn james!)	YG	The Gentlemen's Club
13. "Tiffany"	2026	Producer (with damn james! and Kwak Z)	YG	The Gentlemen's Club
5. "RUBI ROSE"; (with Fredo Bang)	2026	Songwriter	Vory	DONDADA
