= Fuck with You =

Fuck with You may refer to:

- "Fuck with You", a 2011 song by Bob Sinclar featuring Sophie Ellis-Bextor and Gilbere Forte, from Sinclar's album Disco Crash
- "Fuck with You", a 2018 song by Kodak Black featuring Tory Lanez, from Kodak Black's 2018 mixtape Heart Break Kodak
- "F with U", a 2017 song by Kid Ink
