= By Yourself =

2021 single by Ty Dolla Sign featuring Jhené Aiko and Mustard

Single by Ty Dolla Sign featuring Jhené Aiko and Mustard

from the album Featuring Ty Dolla Sign
- Released: February 2, 2021
- Length: 2:29
- Label: Atlantic
- Songwriters: Tyrone Griffin, Jr.; Jhené Chilombo; Dijon McFarlane; Shah Rukh Zaman Khan; Melvin Moore; Nye Lee, Jr.
- Producers: Mustard; GYLTTRYP

Ty Dolla Sign singles chronology
"The Business Part II" (2021)	"By Yourself" (2021)	"Do You Believe" (2021)

Jhené Aiko singles chronology
"Back to the Streets" (2020)	"By Yourself" (2021)	"In the Dark" (2021)

Mustard singles chronology
"High Fashion" (2020)	"By Yourself" (2021)

"By Yourself" is a song by American singer Ty Dolla Sign featuring Jhené Aiko and producer Mustard. The song was sent to rhythmic contemporary radio as the fourth single from the former's third studio album, Featuring Ty Dolla Sign (2020), on February 2, 2021. However, it was originally released as a promotional single from the album on October 16, 2020. It was produced by Mustard and GYLTTRYP. The two wrote the song with the artists alongside Melvin Moore and Nye Lee, Jr. Mustard is also featured alongside American rapper Roddy Ricch on the song "Real Life" from the album, and contributes production to that song, as well as "Everywhere". A remix also featuring Bryson Tiller was released on March 19, 2021, with a music video released a month later on April 28.

== Background ==
Ty Dolla Sign spoke about his collaboration with Jhené Aiko and Mustard and explained the idea of the song:

One of my favorite parts of making this album was getting back in with my brother Mustard and just making hits after hits, like we've been doing for the past decade. The song needed the frequency of a strong woman, so I had to call my sis Jhené who came in and killed it like only she can do. "By Yourself" is an ode to all the amazing women, especially all the single women and the single mothers, who do this thing called life on their own. Especially now more than ever. Ladies if you're handling your responsibilities by yourself, just know we see you and appreciate you.

== Composition ==
Floating over the production of the song, The songs intro is based around a direct high pitched sample of the 1997 hit single G.H.E.T.T.O.U.T. by the Changing Faces. Ty Dolla Sign and Jhené Aiko's vocals blend in together. According to Wongo Okon of Uproxx, Ty Dolla Sign "takes a moment to praise the Miss Independents in his life and commends the women who push through life and take care of their needs by themselves" and Jhené Aiko "steps through with a verse of her own showing that she's an example of a woman who does it by herself".

== Live performances ==
Ty Dolla Sign and Jhené Aiko performed the song live on The Late Show with Stephen Colbert on October 20, 2020. This performance was held only a few hours before the former released the single "Spicy", featuring Post Malone, as the third single of his album, Featuring Ty Dolla Sign.

== Charts ==
Chart performance for "By Yourself"
Chart (2020–2021)	Peak position
New Zealand Hot Singles (RMNZ)	30
US Bubbling Under Hot 100 (Billboard)	16
