= Ego Death (song) =

2020 single by Ty Dolla Sign featuring Kanye West, FKA Twigs, and Skrillex

Single by Ty Dolla Sign featuring Kanye West, FKA Twigs and Skrillex

from the album Featuring Ty Dolla Sign
- Released: July 1, 2020
- Genre: House
- Length: 3:51
- Label: Atlantic
- Songwriters: Tyrone Griffin, Jr.; Kanye West; Tahliah Barnett; Sonny Moore; Ultra Naté; Josiah Wise; Lem Springsteen; Connor Bradley Smith; Craig Ritchie-Allan; Dana Owens; Ikenna Asonye; Jahmal Gwin; Jason Brunton; John Ciafone; Mark Howard James; Ralphi Rosario; Robert Brackins III; Stephanie Victoria Allen; Sylvester Stewart
- Producers: Ty Dolla Sign; Skrillex; BoogzDaBeast

Ty Dolla Sign singles chronology
"All I Need" (2020)	"Ego Death" (2020)	"Yacht Club" (2020)

Kanye West singles chronology
"Wash Us in the Blood" (2020)	"Ego Death" (2020)	"Nah Nah Nah" (2020)

FKA Twigs singles chronology
"If You're Too Shy (Let Me Know)" (2020)	"Ego Death" (2020)	"Sum Bout U" (2020)

Skrillex singles chronology
"Midnight Hour" (2019)	"Ego Death" (2020)	"Selection" (2020)

Lyric video
- "Ego Death" on YouTube

"Ego Death" is a song by American singer Ty Dolla Sign featuring American rapper Kanye West, English singer-songwriter FKA Twigs, and American DJ Skrillex, released for digital download and streaming through Atlantic Records on July 1, 2020, as the lead single from the former's third studio album, Featuring Ty Dolla Sign (2020). It contains additional vocals by Serpentwithfeet, Angela Davis, and Jariuce "Jehreeus" Banks. Ty Dolla Sign, Skrillex, and BoogzDaBeast produced the song. According to Ty, the song expands on West's "Fade", which he was featured on alongside Post Malone. Initially previewed after the Coachella Valley Music and Arts Festival in April 2019, the former experienced an internet leak in March 2020.

A house number, "Ego Death" has electro-hop elements. The song samples Ralphi Rosario's "You Used to Hold Me", Ultra Naté's "Free", and Queen Latifah's "Dance for Me". Lyrically, it centers on ego death. The song received generally positive reviews from music critics, most of whom praised West's verse. Some were appreciative of FKA Twigs' feature, while other critics complimented the chemistry of the four artists. The song reached number seven on the US Bubbling Under Hot 100 chart, published by Billboard, while peaking within the top 50 of the main charts in Ireland and the United Kingdom. An accompanying lyric video was released on July 20, 2020, which is animated and features the performers in cartoon form. They act out lyrics from the song in the video, being accompanied by varying tokens.

== Background and recording ==
"I was just trying to achieve greatness, bro. Every time me and [West] get together, I feel like we just make something great. So I was just trying to do my part. [The rapper is] a very unpredictable person. I feel like I am as well, and somehow it just works every time. Every time we get together, it just works."

— Ty Dolla Sign, discussing working with Kanye West on "Ego Death".

Ty Dolla Sign and Kanye West had previously collaborated for numerous songs, including "Only One" (2014), "Real Friends" (2016), and "Everything We Need" (2019). The former had also worked with Skrillex on multiple songs, including the 2019 releases "Two Nights Part II" and "Midnight Hour"; that same year, he collaborated with American experimental musician Serpentwithfeet on "Receipts". Unlike the others, "Ego Death" was FKA Twigs' first track with Ty Dolla Sign. Skrillex had collaborated with FKA Twigs in the past, while his work with West prior to the latter's sixth studio album Yeezus (2013) was postponed. The track was produced by Ty Dolla Sign, Skrillex, and BoogzDaBeast.

In April 2019, Ty Dolla Sign previewed the song at a Coachella Festival after-party in dedication to 420 by performing a demo version, while vocals from West were also played by the party's DJ. In August 2019, Spin reported that Ty Dolla Sign planned to release "Ego Death" as the lead single for his then-upcoming album. According to him, the song expands on West's 2016 single "Fade", which he appears on. In March 2020, the song leaked online. Ty Dolla Sign shared a teaser for the song on June 30, 2020, unveiling the collaborators. He issued a press release the next day, labeling the song highly special and showing admiration in working with "a genius" in West, who he makes "incredible records" with every time. Ty Dolla Sign further stated that Skrillex and FKA Twigs provided a blessing with the magic only they are capable of delivering, while recalling everyone having gone crazy when he played the song at a house party. The singer revealed he was not offended when the song leaked, admitting that he merely "had to find the right time" for its release and felt "excited that it's finally THAT TIME!" Ty Dolla Sign partnered with the company Triller to create a 9D experience for the listener with the song, marking "the first-ever of its kind" in July 2020.

In an interview with Zane Lowe for Beats 1, Ty Dolla Sign detailed the origins of "Ego Death". He vaguely recalled overhearing women at a party discussing the ego death of a man, considering the concept to be "hard". Ty Dolla Sign said he then had the idea of the song, subsequently making its beat and watching an Instagram video of West walking through Chicago that includes him commenting on a passing train. The former regarded the comment as being "so hard", thus sampling it on the song. Ty Dolla Sign stated that he then went to the city to record for West's then-upcoming album Yandhi, which was later scrapped and became his ninth studio album Jesus Is King (2019). The singer went on to reveal that he played "Ego Death" to West, "and he went crazy". He admitted that all the people in the room "ran out, like, 'Oh, shit'", followed by West using the microphone to beatbox and freestyle. Ty Dolla Sign added that he traveled to London to collaborate with FKA Twigs, before Skrillex worked on the track in Los Angeles; the singer affirmed the recording "was definitely a process".

== Composition and lyrics ==
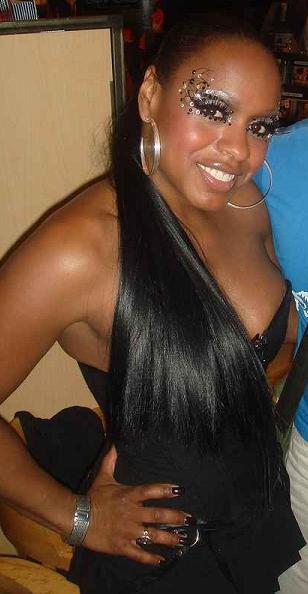
"Ego Death" begins with a sample of Ultra Naté's "Free", which precedes the bass progression that the song is based on.

Musically, "Ego Death" is a house number, with elements of electro-hop. It was compared by numerous publications to "Fade". The song prominently samples the 1987 house record "You Used to Hold Me" by American producer Ralphi Rosario. The opening utilizes a sample of fellow house track "Free" (1997) by recording artist Ultra Naté, which is followed by the song's bass progression. A sample of "Dance for Me" (1989) by Queen Latifah is also included on the song, appearing alongside FKA Twigs' vocals. The song is built on a sparse four-note bass progression, while its beat features the same loop as West's Lil Pump collaboration "I Love It" (2018). 9D is utilized on the song to create additional effects such as reverb, which enables the listener to have the sensation of the music moving around in their headphones. A thumping bassline and speedy percussion are also included, alongside the vocals being covered in funk. Prior to the start of his verse, the song takes a sample of an Instagram video from West; it begins from the 1:50 mark of the video and features him saying "Hold on, this train going by". Ty Dolla Sign delivers the chorus, on which he sings and croons in a calm tone. The singer is followed by West, who raps a verse. Serpentwithfeet performs on the interlude, while additional vocals are also contributed to the song by political activist Angela Davis and music composer Jariuce "Jehreeus" Banks. FKA Twigs is the last performer on the song, singing its short outro.

The lyrics of the song focus on ego death, echoing its title. Ty Dolla Sign sings about the subject, referencing a faltered relationship and his consideration of dismissing self-centered concerns. The singer details his ex-lover leaving him, crooning that she "hurt" and "murdered" his ego when she "walked away". Ty Dolla Sign mentions the "Ego death is where you find happiness" theme, performing the line and succeeding it with, "That's the only place you find happiness." West criticizes the Super Bowl, the Grammys, and what he classes as "halfway movements", as well as addressing birth control and black voter suppression. The rapper brags about becoming a billionaire: "Just hit a billi, he gone on 'em". Serpentwithfeet performs in the background, delivering the line "Your joy isn't tied to me". On the outro, FKA Twigs sings about letting her "ego down" before it makes a comeback.

== Release and promotion ==
"Ego Death" was released for digital download and streaming in various countries as the lead single from Featuring Ty Dolla Sign on July 1, 2020, a day after West released his own single "Wash Us in the Blood". The song was later serviced to US rhythmic contemporary radio stations on July 28, 2020. On October 23, 2020, "Ego Death" was included as the twenty-fifth and final track on Ty Dolla Sign's third studio album Featuring Ty Dolla Sign. Simultaneously with the single release, an accompanying animated visualizer was shared.

An animated lyric video for "Ego Death" was released on July 20, 2020, which was directed by motion graphics artist Emonee LaRussa. The artist handled the animation alongside 10 animators, while three character designers also helped create the video. It is a psychedelic aesthetic, which features cartoon versions of the song's performers and utilizes a kaleidoscope effect. Different personalities are conveyed by them: Ty Dolla Sign appears blood-red and stoned, West is hyper and overly busy, FKA Twigs performs the martial arts that stage performances of hers were inspired by. As the characters act them out, the lyrics are projected on a field of stars. Tokens appear throughout the video, including ones that are connected to relationships, the Grammys, and internal struggles. A woman slits Ty Dolla Sign's throat, symbolizing his ego being killed. The characters can be seen licking neon blood off knives and tripping over magic mushrooms at points, and content that West raps about comes to life.

== Critical reception ==
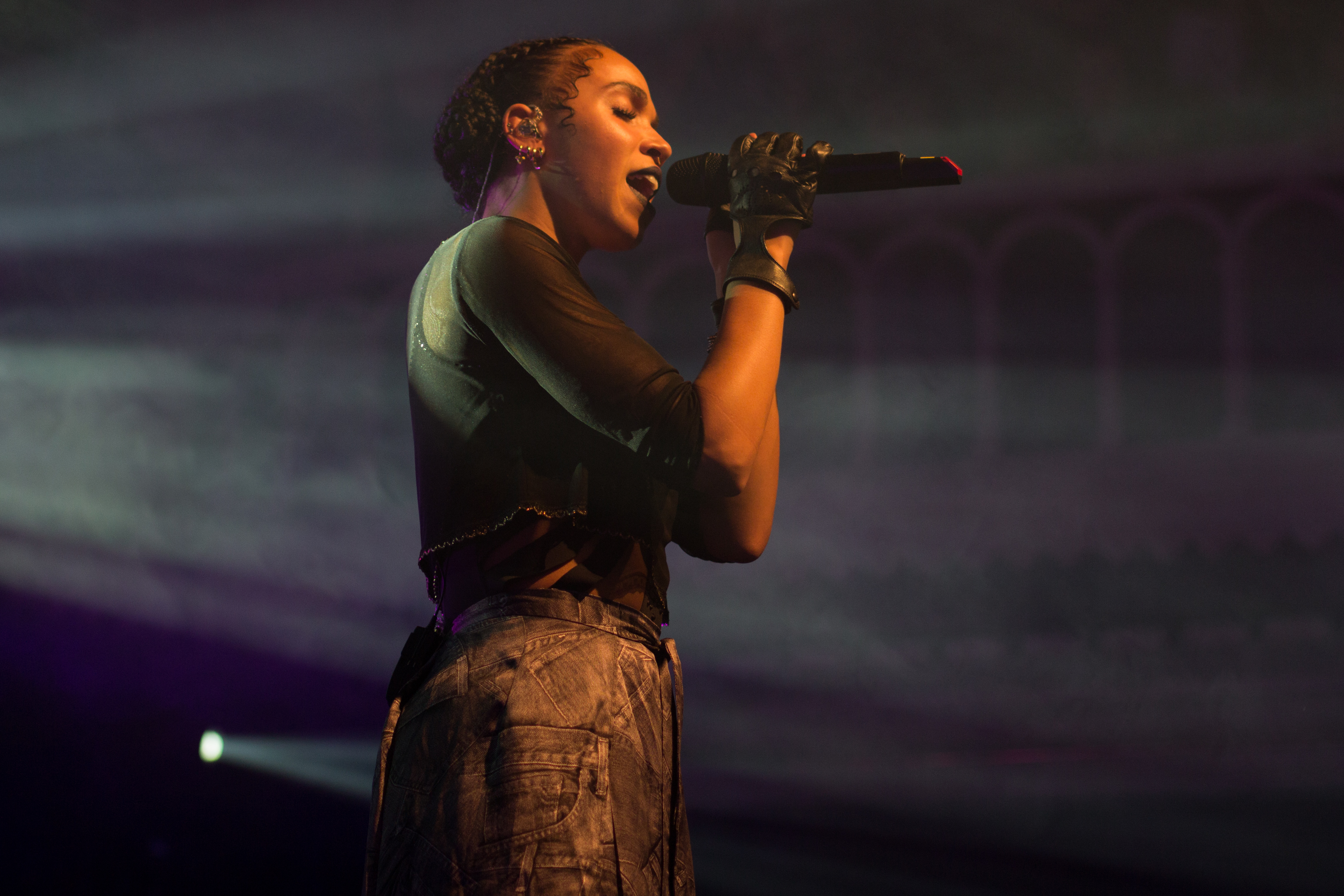
Several reviewers complimented FKA Twigs' appearance on the track.

"Ego Death" was met with generally positive reviews from music critics, with them mostly singling out West's vocals for praise. In a strongly positive review, Clash's Robin Murray asserted that the song is "basically an Avengers Assemble kinda deal", characterizing Ty Dolla Sign as having "gone straight to the top" with "an incredible creative team" he assembled. Murray elaborated by writing that a "resurgent Kanye West", Skrillex's "wild, lawless", exaggerated "futurism", and FKA Twigs' position of a "true auteur" all being present on the song amount to being advantageous, concluding by labelling it "a stunner". In Paper, Logan Potter questioned if the song is "the most powerful collaboration of 2020", lauding Ty Dolla Sign and the featured artists' "stylistic choices". He explained, citing how FKA Twigs has "a fiery pop outro", West returns to his signature sound from before Jesus Is King, and Ty Dolla Sign demonstrates impressive lyrical ability. Brenton Blanchet of Spin opined that "Ego Death" "could best be described as the second coming" of "Fade", assuring the combination of samples only West or Skrillex can put together, the "(probably) bouncy instrumental" to the latter song, West's verse, and FKA Twigs' "magic touch" lead to the song being "a flex of [Ty Dolla Sign's] connections just as much as it's a flex of his raspy vocals".

Writing for Billboard, Carl Lamarre said that the track conveys an "electro-hop feel" as Ty Dolla Sign "leaps into desperation after losing out on his sweetheart" on the chorus, further praising West's "spirited" verse and FKA Twigs' "purring" ending contribution. At MTV, Patrick Hosken said the song carries through West's "momentum" from "Wash Us in the Blood", describing FKA Twigs, Skrillex, and Serpentwithfeet as also "giving life" to the former. He continued, stating the "breezy interlude" is "anchored" by Serpentwithfeet's vocals and the "gorgeously spacey outro" is constructed around FKA Twigs. Jon Caramanica from The New York Times honored the song as an "eccentric, electric jolt of house music" that "deepens" Ty Dolla Sign's catalog. Caramanica further observed "astral, calm singing" from him on the "fleet and free" song, while classifying FKA Twigs' vocals as "tart" and noting that West's verse is "frisky". In a less glowing review for RapReviews, Steve 'Flash' Juon noted how Ty Dolla Sign "needs people to feature on his songs more than the other way around" for getting over being "a better producer than a singing rapper"; he predicted "Ego Death" would be worthless without West, FKA Twigs, and Skrillex. Ben Devlin was somewhat mixed in musicOMH, viewing the song as the album's "star-studded lead single", though he pointed to it resembling a bonus track hurryingly added on at the end. He went on to call the production "brilliant" and similar to "Fade", despite being disappointed in West's highly mediocre verse.

== Commercial performance ==
After its first full week of tracking, "Ego Death" debuted at number seven on the US Billboard Bubbling Under Hot 100 for the chart issue dated July 18, 2020, with 4.5 million on-demand streams. The song lasted for one week on the chart, though earned 2.9 million on-demand streams in its second week of tracking. In the same week as its Hot 100 debut, the song entered the Top Triller U.S. chart at number two, before rising to the summit of the chart for the issue date of July 25, 2020. The song later reached number 29 on the US Rhythmic chart for the issue dated September 5, 2020.

Elsewhere in North America, the song charted at number 69 on the Canadian Hot 100. It remained on the chart for a total of two weeks. "Ego Death" experienced similar performance in Australia, reaching number 68 on the ARIA Singles Chart. In the United Kingdom, the song was most successful, entering the UK Singles Chart at number 34. It spent nine weeks on the chart, the first four of which were within the top 40. On June 11, 2021, the song was certified silver by the British Phonographic Industry (BPI) for amassing 200,000 units in the UK. The song performed similarly in Ireland, debuting at number 41 on the Irish Singles Chart. It peaked at number 54 on both the Scottish Singles Chart and Swedish Sverigetopplistan chart, as well as debuting at number 57 on the Lithuanian Top 100. "Ego Death" further opened at number two on the Top Triller Global chart, with the top video for the song accumulating 2.3 million plays on the app.

== Credits and personnel ==
Credits adapted from Tidal.

- Ty Dolla Sign – producer, writer
- Skrillex – producer, featured artist, mixer, writer
- BoogzDaBeast – producer, writer
- Serpentwithfeet – additional vocals, writer
- Angela Davis – additional vocals
- Jariuce "Jehreeus" Banks – additional vocals
- FKA Twigs – featured artist, writer
- Kanye West – featured artist, writer
- Mike Bozzi – mastering
- James Royo – recording
- Rafael "Fai" Bautista – recording
- Connor Bradley Smith – writer
- Craig Ritchie-Allen – writer
- Dana Owens – writer
- Jason Brunton – writer
- John Ciafone – writer
- Lem Springsteen – writer
- Mark Howard James – writer
- Ralphi Rosario – writer
- Robert Brackins III – writer
- Stephanie Victoria Allen – writer
- Sylvester Stewart – writer
- Ultra Naté – writer

== Charts ==
Chart performance for "Ego Death"
Chart (2020)	Peak position
Australia (ARIA)	68
Belgium (Ultratip Bubbling Under Wallonia)	26
Belgium Dance (Ultratop Wallonia)	20
Belgium Urban (Ultratop Wallonia)	38
Canada Hot 100 (Billboard)	69
Germany (GfK)	92
Greece International Digital Singles (IFPI)	93
Ireland (IRMA)	41
Lithuania (AGATA)	57
New Zealand Hot Singles (RMNZ)	33
Portugal (AFP)	167
Romania (Airplay 100)	80
Scottish Singles Sales (Official Charts)	54
Sweden (Sverigetopplistan)	54
Switzerland (Schweizer Hitparade)	95
UK Singles (Official Charts)	34
UK Hip Hop/R&B (Official Charts)	25
US Bubbling Under Hot 100 (Billboard)	7
US Hot R&B Songs (Billboard)	10
US R&B/Hip-Hop Digital Song Sales (Billboard)	17
US Rhythmic Airplay (Billboard)	29

== Certifications ==
Certifications for "Ego Death"
Region	Certification	Certified units/sales
New Zealand (RMNZ)	Gold	15,000^{‡}
United Kingdom (BPI)	Silver	200,000^{‡}
^{‡} Sales+streaming figures based on certification alone.

== Release history ==
Release dates and formats for "Ego Death"
Region	Date	Format(s)	Label	Ref.
Various	July 1, 2020	Digital download; streaming	Atlantic	
United States	July 28, 2020	Rhythmic contemporary radio	Atlantic	
