= Move Ya Hips =

2020 single by ASAP Ferg featuring Nicki Minaj and MadeinTYO

Single by ASAP Ferg featuring Nicki Minaj and MadeinTYO

from the album Floor Seats II
- Released: July 30, 2020
- Genre: Hip hop
- Length: 2:26
- Label: RCA; A$AP Worldwide; Polo Grounds
- Songwriters: Darold Brown; Onika Maraj; Malcolm Davis; Frank Parra
- Producer: Frankie P

ASAP Ferg singles chronology
| "Square Bitch" (2020) | "Move Ya Hips" (2020) | "No Ceilings" (2020) |

Nicki Minaj singles chronology
| "Trollz" (2020) | "Move Ya Hips" (2020) | "Expensive" (2020) |

MadeinTYO singles chronology
| "Square Bitch" (2020) | "Move Ya Hips" (2020) | "Money Up" (2020) |

Music video
- "Move Ya Hips" on YouTube

"Move Ya Hips" is a song by the American rapper ASAP Ferg featuring Nicki Minaj and MadeinTYO. Written alongside producer Frankie P, it was released on July 30, 2020, as the lead single from Ferg's third mixtape Floor Seats II. The song sees Ferg and Minaj trading verses about their rich lifestyles, while MadeinTYO delivers the chorus over a "bouncy" drum beat.

The song peaked at number 19 in the United States and broke the record for the biggest single-week downward movement in Billboard Hot 100 history after it fell 80 spots to number 99 the following week; this record was later broken by "We Cry Together" by Kendrick Lamar and Taylour Paige on June 4, 2022, and "Texts Go Green" by Drake on July 9, 2022, with both songs falling 81 spots.

== Background ==
"Move Ya Hips" was first teased by DJ Clue back in May 2020 when he played a snippet of the song on his Instagram Live. In late June, Minaj confirmed the collaboration, encouraging her fans to "light up" ASAP Ferg's social media for the song to be released. On July 27, Ferg's fellow ASAP Mob member, ASAP Rocky urged Ferg to release the track. Later the same day, Ferg and Minaj announced the release of the song. The song marks the third collaboration between Ferg and Minaj following the 2017 remix of Ferg's "Plain Jane" and the song "Runnin" from the Creed II soundtrack (2018), while Ferg and MadeinTYO collaborated in early 2020 for the track "Square Bitch". Producer Frankie P and Ferg have also worked together various times.

== Composition ==
The song sees MadeinTYO performing the chorus, while Ferg and Minaj rap about a lavish, wealthy lifestyle over a "bouncy" drum beat from Frankie P. Ferg and Minaj trade verses toward the end of the song and both shout-out their hometowns. Minaj also references her verse on ASAP Ferg's "Plain Jane" with the line "Already bodied 'Plain Jane' and we mobbin' now". Rolling Stone's Claire Shaffer noted that "although this is technically an A$AP Ferg track, and MadeinTYO raps the hook, Nicki has the most extensive verse out of the three of them, kicking off with a Juice reference and ending with a shoutout to Rogue from X-Men.

== Critical reception ==
Vulture's Justin Curto singled out Minaj's verse, calling it "sharp", although stating it is "no 'New Body' verse". Revolt's Jon Powell called the track a "surefire banger" and complimented producer Frankie P's "trunk-rattling" production. Tom Breihan of Stereogum posed the question: "Is it possible to throw Nicki Minaj on any old song these days and get a hit out of it?", further opining that Ferg and Minaj "at least find a complementary energy". Hypebeast's Nicolaus Li also called their energy complementary and said the two "deliver respective hard-hitting bars". Billboard's Jason Lipshutz called the track "punchy" and "unfussy", praising Minaj for dominating the track's short running time, stating: "Ten years after her breakthrough verse on Kanye West's 'Monster', Minaj still has the ability to rearrange the molecules of a song with a flow that's both bone-crushing and animated, and 'Move Ya Hips' is another highlight in a career full of them". Lipshutz described MadeinTYO's hook as "straightforward", and further stated ASAP Ferg checks in with a sexually explicit verse, "but as soon as Minaj barges in midway through, the song receives a jolt of energy". Lake Schatz of Consequence of Sound had a similar sentiment, stating that Minaj "steals the show with her signature cadence, stuffing in references to her favorite high fashion brands and her past (and somewhat problematically named) haircut styles". The Fader's Jordan Darville said the rappers maintain the chemistry from their previous collaborations, with Minaj incorporating "some of that classic Minaj feature verse energy". Similarly, Aaron Williams of Uproxx said Minaj delivered "a trademark, no-frills Nicki Minaj verse", and noted while MadeinTYO "handles the simple, catchy chorus, Ferg and Nicki trade bars, employing a back-and-forth pass-the-mic session on the back end of the song that sounds like the two mind melded in the studio, finishing each others' sentences". Jessica McKinney of Complex named it among the best songs of the week, stating although it is not exactly a high-energy track, ASAP Ferg comes through with "rambunctious" bars, while Minaj "is equally punchy as she alternates between a deep Queens accent and her high pitched Barbie voice". Robyn Mowatt of Okayplayer said "Ferg's aggressive first verse is an ideal start for the energetic track", but called Minaj "the highlight of the entire single", noting how she commands attention. Rap-Up said Minaj " bodies the beat with her ferocious flow".

== Chart performance ==
The week of August 15, 2020, the song peaked at number 19 on the US Billboard Hot 100, becoming both ASAP Ferg and MadeinTYO's highest-charting songs in the US. The following week, it dropped to number 99, temporarily breaking the record for the largest downward movement in Hot 100 history with 80 spots.

== Music video ==
A late-night fitness advertisement-themed visualizer was released alongside the song, featuring a workout class exercising to the song in 80s-inspired gym attire. Revolt's Jon Powell called the video "hilarious", while Variety's Jem Aswad deemed it sexist. The visual has been compared to the video for Kanye West's "The New Workout Plan".

== Charts ==
Chart performance for "Move Ya Hips"
| Chart (2020) | Peak position |
|---|---|
| Canada Hot 100 (Billboard) | 73 |
| US Billboard Hot 100 | 19 |
| US Hot R&B/Hip-Hop Songs (Billboard) | 8 |
| US Rhythmic Airplay (Billboard) | 26 |
| US Rolling Stone Top 100 | 16 |
