= The Other Side (SZA and Justin Timberlake song) =

2020 single by SZA and Justin Timberlake

Single by SZA and Justin Timberlake

from the album Trolls World Tour: Original Motion Picture Soundtrack
- Released: February 25, 2020
- Recorded: 2019
- Genre: Disco; pop
- Length: 3:08 (single version); 2:55 (radio edit)
- Label: RCA
- Songwriters: Solána Rowe; Justin Timberlake; Ludwig Göransson; Max Martin; Sarah Aarons
- Producers: Justin Timberlake; Ludwig Göransson

SZA singles chronology
"Just Us" (2019)	"The Other Side" (2020)	"Hit Different" (2020)

Justin Timberlake singles chronology
"Believe" (2020)	"The Other Side" (2020)	"Don't Slack" (2020)

Music video
- "The Other Side" on YouTube

"The Other Side" is a song by American singers SZA and Justin Timberlake. It was released on February 25, 2020, as the lead single from the soundtrack to the film Trolls World Tour, in which the latter voices the character Branch. The artists wrote the song alongside Max Martin, Sarah Aarons, and Ludwig Göransson, who produced it with Timberlake.

== Background and promotion ==
In February 2017, it was confirmed that Timberlake would be voicing the character Branch once again for a continuation of the Trolls series. On August 19, 2019, SZA stated in an interview with Kerwin Frost that she had recently hit the studio with Timberlake. Timberlake confirmed the collaboration in October 2019, although not yet disclosing any details on what project it was intended for. On January 20, 2020, SZA took to her social media to post pictures of her in different costumes and settings, which would later turn out to be part of the video shoot. About the collaboration with Timberlake, the singer explained that she was "thrilled to be invited to participate in this project with Justin". On February 21, 2020, Timberlake posted a short video of himself talking about the song and providing the release date on Instagram.

== Composition ==
Amanda Gordon of Vulture described the song as "a deeply infectious, groovy song peppered with the kinds of handclaps and funky keyboard riffs designed to make you move".

== Music video ==
The music video, released on February 26, 2020, features the artists dancing and grooving in various settings. Critics drew comparisons to "Hype Williams' 1990s fish-eye-lensed clips for Missy Elliott, Diddy, Mase and others". The music video on YouTube has received over 35 million views as of April 2024.

== Charts ==
=== Weekly charts ===
Chart (2020)	Peak position
Australia (ARIA)	43
Belgium (Ultratop 50 Flanders)	50
Belgium (Ultratop 50 Wallonia)	8
Bolivia (Monitor Latino)	11
Canada Hot 100 (Billboard)	54
Canada AC (Billboard)	21
Canada CHR/Top 40 (Billboard)	16
Canada Hot AC (Billboard)	11
Croatia (HRT)	8
Czech Republic Airplay (ČNS IFPI)	20
Czech Republic Singles Digital (ČNS IFPI)	92
French Sales (SNEP)	23
Germany (GfK)	88
Hungary (Rádiós Top 40)	17
Hungary (Single Top 40)	9
Iceland (Tónlistinn)	33
Ireland (IRMA)	56
Italian Airplay (EarOne)	4
Lithuania (AGATA)	32
Mexico Ingles Airplay (Billboard)	20
Netherlands (Dutch Top 40)	31
Netherlands (Single Top 100)	60
New Zealand Hot Singles (RMNZ)	2
Portugal (AFP)	119
Romania (Airplay 100)	67
Scottish Singles Sales (Official Charts)	27
Slovakia Airplay (ČNS IFPI)	82
Slovakia Singles Digital (ČNS IFPI)	74
Slovenia (SloTop50)	12
Sweden Heatseeker (Sverigetopplistan)	10
Switzerland (Schweizer Hitparade)	47
UK Singles (Official Charts)	44
US Billboard Hot 100	61
US Adult Contemporary (Billboard)	22
US Adult Pop Airplay (Billboard)	13
US Dance Airplay (Billboard)	35
US Hot R&B/Hip-Hop Songs (Billboard)	33
US Pop Airplay (Billboard)	17
US Rhythmic Airplay (Billboard)	24
US Rolling Stone Top 100	84
Venezuela Anglo (Record Report)	18
Venezuela Pop (Record Report)	36

=== Year-end charts ===
Chart (2020)	Position
Argentina Airplay (Monitor Latino)	79
Belgium (Ultratop Wallonia)	44

== Certifications ==
Region	Certification	Certified units/sales
Brazil (Pro-Música Brasil)	Platinum	40,000^{‡}
New Zealand (RMNZ)	Gold	15,000^{‡}
United Kingdom (BPI)	Silver	200,000^{‡}
United States (RIAA)	Platinum	1,000,000^{‡}
^{‡} Sales+streaming figures based on certification alone.

== Release history ==
Region	Date	Format	Label	Ref.
Various	February 26, 2020	Digital download; streaming	RCA	
United States	March 2, 2020	Hot adult contemporary radio	RCA	
United States	March 3, 2020	Contemporary hit radio	RCA	
United States	March 3, 2020	Rhythmic contemporary radio	RCA	
