= Trolls World Tour (soundtrack) =

2020 soundtrack album

Trolls World Tour: Original Motion Picture Soundtrack

Soundtrack album by Various artists
- Released: March 13, 2020
- Genre: Children's music
- Length: 60:00
- Label: RCA
- Producers: Justin Timberlake; Ludwig Göransson

Singles from Trolls World Tour: Original Motion Picture Soundtrack
- 1. "The Other Side" Released: February 26, 2020

Trolls World Tour: Original Motion Picture Soundtrack is the soundtrack album to the 2020 DreamWorks Animation film Trolls World Tour, released by RCA Records on March 13, 2020. The soundtrack is produced primarily by singer-songwriter Justin Timberlake. The singles "The Other Side" by SZA and Timberlake and "Don't Slack" by Anderson .Paak and Timberlake were released prior to the album. The soundtrack was nominated for an American Music Award.

== Background ==
As well as reprising his voice role as Branch from the previous film, Justin Timberlake also served as executive producer for its soundtrack, as he did on the original film's soundtrack, released in 2016. He revealed a handwritten list of the tracks on the soundtrack on his social media on February 13, also tagging the major artists featured on it.

Following the plot of the film, in which the Trolls from the first film discover that Trolls around the world are divided by six different types of music (pop, funk, classical, techno, country, and rock), the soundtrack features songs in those genres.

== Accolades ==
The soundtrack earned an American Music Award nomination for favorite soundtrack. The song Just Sing won a Hollywood Music in Media Award for Best Original Song in an Animated Film.

== Track listing ==
No.	Title	Writer(s)	Producer(s)	Length
1.	"The Other Side" (SZA and Justin Timberlake)	Solána Rowe; Sarah Aarons; Justin Timberlake; Ludwig Göransson; Max Martin	Timberlake; Göransson	3:08
2.	"Trolls Wanna Have Good Times" (Anna Kendrick, Justin Timberlake, James Corden, Ester Dean, Icona Pop, Kenan Thompson and The Pop Trolls)	Thompson; Bernard Edwards; Christopher Hartz; Dmitry Brill; Herbie Hancock; Lady Miss Kier; Göransson; Nile Rodgers; Q-Tip; Robert Hazard; Towa Tei	Göransson	3:25
3.	"Don't Slack" (Anderson .Paak and Justin Timberlake)	Timberlake; Brandon Anderson; Göransson	Timberlake; Anderson .Paak; Göransson	2:54
4.	"It's All Love" (Anderson .Paak, Justin Timberlake, Mary J. Blige and George Clinton)	Anderson; James Fauntleroy; Joseph Shirley; Göransson	Shirley; Göransson	3:35
5.	"Just Sing" (Justin Timberlake, Anna Kendrick, Kelly Clarkson, Mary J. Blige, Anderson .Paak and Kenan Thompson)	Timberlake; Aarons; Göransson; Martin	Timberlake; Göransson	3:34
6.	"One More Time" (Anthony Ramos)	Thomas Bangalter; Guy-Manuel de Homem-Christo; Anthony Moore	Göransson	2:42
7.	"Atomic Dog World Tour Remix" (George Clinton and Parliament-Funkadelic, Anderson .Paak and Mary J. Blige)	Clinton; David Spradley; Garry Shider; Anderson	Clinton; Shirley; Göransson	4:17
8.	"Rainbows, Unicorns, Everything Nice" (Walt Dohrn and Joseph Shirley)	Aidan Jensen	Göransson	0:12
9.	"Rock N Roll Rules" (Haim and Ludwig Göransson)	Alana Haim; Danielle Haim; Este Haim; Göransson	Göransson	3:10
10.	"Leaving Lonesome Flats" (Dierks Bentley)	Chris Stapleton; Timberlake	Timberlake; Göransson	3:10
11.	"Born to Die" (Kelly Clarkson)	Stapleton; Timberlake	Timberlake; Göransson	3:26
12.	"Trolls 2 Many Hits Mashup" (Anna Kendrick, Justin Timberlake, James Corden, Icona Pop and The Pop Trolls)	Anslem Douglas; Armando Perez; Donnie Wahlberg; Dan Hartman; Emma Bunton; Yoo Gun-hyung; Park Jai-sang; David Listenbee; Mark Wahlberg; Matthew Rowe; Melanie Brown; Melanie Chrisholm; Peter Schroeder; Biff Stannard; Sandy Wilhelm; Stefan Gordy; Skyler Gordy; Faheem Najm	Göransson	1:01
13.	"Barracuda" (Rachel Bloom)	Ann Wilson; Michael Derosier; Nancy Wilson; Roger Fisher	Göransson	4:06
14.	"Yodel Beat" (Ludwig Göransson)	Göransson	Göransson	2:50
15.	"Crazy Train" (Rachel Bloom)	Ozzy Osbourne; Randy Rhoads; Bob Daisley	Göransson	3:15
16.	"I Fall to Pieces" (Sam Rockwell)	Hank Cochran; Harlan Howard	Göransson	2:14
17.	"Perfect for Me" (Justin Timberlake)	Timberlake; Kenyon Dixon; Göransson	Timberlake; Göransson	3:47
18.	"Rock You Like a Hurricane" (Bloom)	Herman Rarebell; Klaus Meine; Rudolf Schenker	Göransson	3:05
19.	"It's All Love (History of Funk)" (George Clinton, Mary J. Blige, Anderson .Paak)	Anderson; Fauntleroy; Shirley; Göransson	Shirley; Göransson	2:10
20.	"Just Sing (Trolls World Tour)" (Justin Timberlake, Anna Kendrick, James Corden, Kelly Clarkson, George Clinton, Mary J. Blige, Anderson .Paak, Ron Funches, Kunal Nayyar, Gwen Stefani, Walt Dohrn, Kevin Michael Richardson, Ozzy Osbourne, Karan Soni, Gustavo Dudamel, Rachel Bloom, Kenan Thompson, Anthony Ramos, Red Velvet, Icona Pop and Sam Rockwell)	S. Rowe; Timberlake; Aarons; Göransson; Martin	Timberlake; Göransson	4:00
Total length:				60:00

== Score ==
All music is composed by Theodore Shapiro.

No.	Title	Length
1.	"Behold the Pop String"	1:30
2.	"To Queen Poppy"	1:25
3.	"The Six Strings"	0:43
4.	"Queen Barb's World Tour"	1:54
5.	"Aboard the Flowerface Balloon"	1:44
6.	"Journeys Begin"	1:51
7.	"Symphonyville"	1:49
8.	"The Pinky Promise"	1:50
9.	"The Woodwind for the Job"	0:37
10.	"To Queen Barb"	1:42
11.	"Arriving in Lonesome Flats"	1:13
12.	"Jailed"	0:37
13.	"Hickory to the Rescue"	0:52
14.	"Trolls Is Trolls"	0:37
15.	"Smooth Jazz Chaz"	1:41
16.	"A Broken Pinky Promise"	2:05
17.	"Cooper's Origin Story"	0:39
18.	"The Truth of Who We Are"	1:03
19.	"Good Queens Listen"	2:18
20.	"Hickory Split"	1:31
21.	"Barb's Mission Accomplished"	1:44
22.	"One Nation Under Rock"	1:50
23.	"Your Former Leaders"	0:58
24.	"Branch to the Rescue"	1:14
25.	"Zombified"	0:51
26.	"Poppy Destroys the World"	1:03
27.	"Heartbeatbox"	3:24
28.	"Done with My Nap and Ready to Party"	0:10
Total length:		38:55

== Charts ==
=== Weekly charts ===
Weekly chart performance for Trolls World Tour
Chart (2020)	Peak position
Australian Albums (ARIA)	66
Canadian Albums (Billboard)	33
Spanish Albums (PROMUSICAE)	57
US Billboard 200	15
US Kid Albums (Billboard)	1
US Soundtrack Albums (Billboard)	2

=== Year-end charts ===
Year-end chart performance for Trolls World Tour
Chart (2020)	Position
US Soundtrack Albums (Billboard)	7
