= Vitamin D (song) =

Single by Ludacris featuring Ty Dolla Sign
- Released: March 31, 2017
- Recorded: 2017
- Genre: Dirty rap
- Length: 4:21
- Label: Disturbing tha Peace
- Songwriters: Christopher Bridges; Tyrone Griffin; Tim Kelley; Bob Robinson; Sisqó
- Producers: Da Internz; Miykal Snoddy GMF

Ludacris singles chronology
"Run the Check Up" (2016)	"Vitamin D" (2017)	"Grey" (2017)

Ty Dolla Sign singles chronology
"H.O.E. (Heaven On Earth)" (2017)	"Vitamin D" (2017)	"F with U" (2017)

"Vitamin D" is a song by American rapper Ludacris featuring American singer Ty Dolla $ign. It was released March 31, 2017 as the planned lead single from Ludacris's then-upcoming tenth studio album, set for release in 2018. The track was produced by Da Internz, Miykal Snoddy and GMF.

The song contains a sample of "Thong Song" by Sisqó.

== Music video ==
On April 10, 2017, Ludacris uploaded the music video for "Vitamin D" to his YouTube account.

== Release history ==
Region	Date	Format(s)	Label	Ref
United States	March 31, 2017	Digital download	Disturbing tha Peace	
