= Featuring Ty Dolla Sign =

Studio album by Ty Dolla Sign
- Released: October 23, 2020
- Genres: R&B; pop; hip-hop
- Length: 60:01
- Label: Atlantic
- Producers: Ty Dolla Sign; Ali P; BlueySport; BongoByTheWay; BoogzDaBeast; Charlie Handsome; Chordz; Cicero; CJ Branch; D'Mile; D.A Got That Dope; Damn James; Dave Kuncio; Dis; DY Krazy; Gabe Shaddow; GYLTTRYP; Hit-Boy; J Proof; Jasper Harris; Kayron; Mike Crook; Murda Beatz; Mustard; Nano; Pop Wansel; Skrillex; Westen Weiss; Wheezy; William Van Zandt

Ty Dolla Sign chronology
MihTy (2018)	Featuring Ty Dolla Sign (2020)	Cheers to the Best Memories (2021)

Singles from Featuring Ty Dolla Sign
- 1. "Ego Death" Released: July 1, 2020; 2. "Expensive" Released: August 28, 2020; 3. "Spicy" Released: October 21, 2020; 4. "By Yourself" Released: February 2, 2021

Featuring Ty Dolla Sign (stylized as Featuring Ty Dolla $ign) is the third studio album by American rapper and singer Ty Dolla Sign. It was released on October 23, 2020, by Atlantic Records. The album features guest appearances from Kid Cudi, Post Malone, Kanye West, Anderson .Paak, Quavo, Nicki Minaj, Kehlani, Big Sean, Roddy Ricch, Jhené Aiko, Future, Young Thug, FKA Twigs, and Skrillex, among others.

== Background ==
In an interview with Spin in July 2019, Ty Dolla Sign first talked about the album, saying "I wasn't focused on, like, 'Oh, let's go make a fuckin' generic-ass hit, you know, 97 BPMs-plus, get the club going" and simultaneously stressed the importance of distinguishing himself from other artists, "I just wanted to give people some good music to listen to—something that sounds different from everybody else's shit". On December 16, 2019, it was reported that he planned to release two albums in 2020.

On July 2, 2020, Ty announced that the album's title would be Dream House, which would end his Beach House series. However, on October 8, 2020, the singer announced that the title had changed to Featuring Ty Dolla Sign, which refers to songs that he has been featured on for other artists. In a press release, he explained his choice, by saying "many people have said that when you see a song that says, 'featuring Ty Dolla $ign', you know it's gonna be fire".

On October 14, 2020, the official cover art was revealed on social media. Six days later, on October 20, the track listing was revealed.

== Promotion ==
"Ego Death" featuring Kanye West, FKA Twigs, and Skrillex, was released as the lead single on July 1, 2020. The second single, "Expensive" featuring Nicki Minaj, was released on August 28, 2020. The third single, "Spicy" featuring Post Malone, was released on October 21, 2020. "By Yourself" featuring Jhené Aiko and Mustard, was first released as a promotional single on October 16, 2020, it was later released to urban contemporary radio on February 2, 2021, as the album's fourth single.

== Critical reception ==
Professional ratings
Aggregate scores
Source	Rating
AnyDecentMusic?	7.1/10
Metacritic	79/100
Review scores
Source	Rating
AllMusic	4/5 stars
Clash	8/10
MusicOMH	4/5 stars
NME	4/5 stars
Pitchfork	7.7/10
RapReviews	6/10
Rolling Stone	3.5/5 stars
Slant Magazine	3/5 stars

Featuring Ty Dolla Sign was met with generally favorable reviews. At Metacritic, which assigns a normalized rating out of 100 to reviews from professional publications, the album received an average score of 79, based on seven reviews. Aggregator AnyDecentMusic? gave it 7.1 out of 10, based on their assessment of the critical consensus.

In a positive review, Nicolas-Tyrell Scott of NME wrote that "There's sure to be filler across 25-tracks. However, when Ty is at his best, he soars vocally and continues to prove that he is both a hook and melody juggernaut". Robin Murray from Clash enjoyed the album, saying, "An often hit and miss experience, 'Featuring' exposes the vast creativity of feature culture, while also platforming its flaws. An unwieldy listen that still carries huge expectation, Ty Dolla $ign's latest album holds nothing back – that's its beauty, but also its deepest flaw". Dani Blum of Pitchfork stated, "Featuring cements his legacy as a singular, eminent artist – a point he has made again and again and again, but he still sounds so good proving it". Danny Schwartz of Rolling Stone wrote, "Featuring Ty$ reaffirms his gifts as a savvy songwriter who knows precisely how and when to introduce tension, dimension, and even warmth to his casual womanizing". Ben Devlin of MusicOMH said, "His newest release is an hour-long suite that aims to pack in as many hooks, guests, melodies and trap beats as possible, and succeeds with flying colours".

In a mixed review, Charles Lyons-Burt of Slant Magazine said, "Featuring Ty Dolla $ign has the air of a haphazard playlist. Griffin is still a formidable center of gravity for a small army of eager collaborators, but the final product wants for some necessary fine-tuning". Steve "Flash" Juon of RapReviews said, "He's a fine producer, a middling singer, and a very forgettable lyricist. The album's title banks on his name being the sole draw, but if it has been titled "Featuring Kanye West, Quavo, Kid Cudi, Young Thug, Big Sean and Future" it would be a whole lot more accurate".

=== Rankings ===
Select year-end rankings of Featuring Ty Dolla Sign
Publication	List	Rank	Ref.
Cleveland.com	Best Albums of 2020	45	
Complex	The Best Albums of 2020	48	
Noisey	The 100 Best Albums of 2020	42	
Uproxx	The Best R&B Albums of 2020	7	

== Commercial performance ==
Featuring Ty Dolla Sign debuted at number four on the US Billboard 200 chart, earning 44,000 album-equivalent units (including 4,000 copies as pure album sales) in its first week. This became Ty Dolla Sign's first US top-ten debut. The album also accumulated at total of 50.83 million on-demand streams of the album's songs that week.

== Track listing ==
Featuring Ty Dolla Sign track listing
No.	Title	Writer(s)	Producer(s)	Length
1.	"Intro"	Tyrone Griffin, Jr.		0:25
2.	"Status"	Griffin; Jason Boyd; Raymond Komba; Stephen Feigenbaum; Tarron Crayton; Uforo Ebong; Dernst Emile II	BongoByTheWay; D'Mile^{[a]}; Ty Dolla Sign^{[a]}	1:46
3.	"Temptations" (featuring Kid Cudi)	Griffin; Scott Mescudi; Chauncey Hollis; Sonny Moore; Melvin Moore; Derrick Milano; Jazzaé De Waal	Hit-Boy; Skrillex	2:33
4.	"Serpentwithfeet Interlude"	Griffin; Josiah Wise		0:56
5.	"Spicy" (featuring Post Malone)	Griffin; Austin Post; James Royo; Westen Weiss; Glenda Proby; Nye Lee, Jr.	Ty Dolla Sign; Damn James!; Weiss	2:23
6.	"Track 6" (featuring Kanye West, Anderson .Paak and Thundercat)	Griffin; Kanye West; Brandon Anderson; Stephen Bruner; Byron Chambers; Jahmal Gwin; Royo; Rafael Brown	Ty Dolla Sign; BoogzDaBeast; Damn James!; Audio Anthem^{[a]}	2:41
7.	"Freak" (featuring Quavo)	Griffin; Quavious Marshall; Royo; Alexander Krashinsky; William Van Zandt	Ty Dolla Sign; Damn James!; BlueySport; Van Zandt	2:42
8.	"Double R" (featuring Lil Durk)	Griffin; Durk Banks; Lee; Sean Stein; Royo	Ty Dolla Sign; Dis; Damn James!	2:35
9.	"Expensive" (featuring Nicki Minaj)	Griffin; Onika Maraj; De Waal; Lee; Royo; Krashinsky; Van Zandt; Jordan Jackson	Ty Dolla Sign; Damn James!; BlueySport; Van Zandt	2:17
10.	"Burna Boy Interlude"	Griffin; Damini Ogulu		0:47
11.	"Tyrone 2021" (featuring Big Sean)	Griffin; Sean Anderson; Shane Lindstrom; Proby; Erica Wright; Norman Hurt	Ty Dolla Sign; Murda Beatz	2:38
12.	"It's Still Free TC"	Griffin		0:34
13.	"Real Life" (featuring Roddy Ricch and Mustard)	Griffin; Rodrick Moore, Jr.; Dijon McFarlane; Shah Rukh Zaman Khan; De Waal; Lee	Mustard; Gylttryp^{[c]}	2:46
14.	"Nothing Like Your Exes"	Griffin; M. Moore; De Waal; S. Khan; Michael Crook; Lee; Gabriel Shaddow; Royo; Chaka Khan; Tony Maiden	Ty Dolla Sign; Gylttryp; Mike Crook; Nano; Gabe Shaddow^{[a]}; Damn James!^{[a]}	2:39
15.	"By Yourself" (featuring Jhené Aiko and Mustard)	Griffin; Jhené Chilombo; McFarlane; M. Moore; S. Khan; Lee	Mustard; Gylttryp^{[c]}	2:29
16.	"Universe" (featuring Kehlani)	Griffin; Kehlani Parrish; David Doman; Justin Thomas; Mathew Haze; J. Lauren	D.A Got That Dope	3:40
17.	"Lift Me Up" (featuring Future and Young Thug)	Griffin; Nayvadius Wilburn; Jeffery Williams; Dwan Avery; Rahshan Kyles; Royo; Shaddow	Ty Dolla Sign; Cicero; DY Krazy; Damn James!; Shaddow	3:32
18.	"Time Will Tell"	Griffin; Wesley Glass; Nija Charles; De Waal; Emile; Ryan Vojtesak	Charlie Handsome; D'Mile; Wheezy	2:49
19.	"Dr. Sebi"	Williams	D'Mile	1:09
20.	"Powder Blue" (featuring Gunna)	Griffin; Sergio Kitchens; Jasper Harris; Romie Stephen IV; Marlon Barrow; M. Moore	Ty Dolla SIgn; Harris; Kayron; Chordz	2:29
21.	"Everywhere"	Griffin; McFarlane; Boyd; Lee; Mike Lowry; Ebong	Ty Dolla Sign; Mustard; Bongo ByTheWay	3:00
22.	"Slow It Down"	Griffin; Andrew Wansel; Jameel Roberts; Clarence Branch III; Proby; Curtis Gadson; Rollin Sanders; Rosalyn Newberry	CJ Branch; J Proof; Pop Wansel	3:33
23.	"Your Turn" (featuring Musiq Soulchild, Tish Hyman and 6lack)	Griffin; Latisha Hyman; Ricardo Valentine; Andre Harris; Emile; Aliandro Prawl; Dave Kuncio	Ty Dolla Sign; D'Mile; Ali P; Kuncio	5:20
24.	"Return"	Griffin		0:26
25.	"Ego Death" (featuring Kanye West, FKA Twigs and Skrillex)	Griffin; West; Tahliah Barnett; S. Moore; Wise; Connor Smith; Craig Ritchie-Allan; Ikenna Asonye; Jason Brunton; Robert Brackins III; Stephanie Allen; Gwin; Ralphi Rosario; Ultra Naté; Lem Springsteen; John Ciafone; Dana Owens; Mark James; Sylvester Stewart	Ty Dolla Sign; Skrillex; BoogzDaBeast	3:52
Total length:				60:01

Notes

- ^{^[c]} signifies a co-producer
- ^{^[a]} signifies an additional producer

== Personnel ==
Musicians

- Ty Dolla Sign – guitar (1, 12, 24), vocals (2–9, 11–18, 20–25)
- Gabreal "Big TC" Griffin – vocals (1, 12, 24)
- Justus West – guitar (2), vocals (4)
- Johan Lenox – strings (2, 15)
- Serpentwithfeet – vocals (4), additional vocals (25)
- BlueySport – programming (9)
- Damn James – programming (9)
- William van Zandt – programming (9)
- Burna Boy – vocals (10)
- Brandon Chapman – guitar (15)
- DJ Camper – keyboards (15)
- Angela Davis – additional vocals (25)
- Jariuce "Jehreeus" Banks – additional vocals (25)

Technical

- James Royo – mixer (2, 5–8, 11, 13–18, 20–22), recording (5–9, 13–15, 17, 21–23, 25), additional mixer (3)
- Skrillex – mixer (3, 25)
- Derek "MixedByAli" Ali – mixer (9), additional mixer (13)
- Rafael Fai Bautista – mixer (23), recording (2, 3, 5, 16, 18–20, 23, 25), additional mixer (2, 3, 16, 18), additional recording (6–9, 11, 13–15, 21, 22)
- Mike Bozzi – masterer (5, 15, 25)
- Nicolas De Porcel – masterer (9)
- William J. Sullivan – recording (3), additional mixer (3)
- Ty Dolla Sign – recording (5, 8, 14, 15)
- Nick Mac – recording (5)
- Jhair "Jha" Lazo – recording (6), additional mixer (6)
- Aubry "Big Juice" Delaine – recording (9)
- Gregg Rominiecki – recording (11), additional mixer (11)
- Eric Manco – recording (17)
- Marlon Travis Barrow – engineer (20)
- Drew Gold – additional mixer (3)
- Louis Bell – additional mixer (5)
- Jared "JT" Gagarin – additional mixer (23)
- Robert Z. Zarate – additional recording (16, 18, 19, 22)
- Todd Norman – assistant mixer (2, 5, 7, 13–15, 17, 21, 22)
- Grace Royo – assistant mixer (5, 6, 16, 19)
- Nate Graves – assistant mixer (5, 7, 14, 21, 22), assistant engineer (16, 19), assistant mix engineer (23)
- Yanis Figueroa – assistant mixer (5)
- Curtis "Sircut" Bye – assistant mixer (9, 13)
- Nightcrawler – assistant mixer (18)
- Roscoe – assistant mixer (18)
- Brian "Deep" Watters – assistant mixer (23)
- Chris Kahn – assistant mix engineer (3)
- Scott Stratton – assistant masterer (5)
- Andrew Keller – assistant recording engineer (5), assistant engineer (14), assistant mixer (15)
- Sam Agbasi – assistant recording engineer (5)
- Matthew Wilson – assistant engineer (8, 23)
- Ruben Jigga Pinto – assistant engineer (23)
- Jamal Berry – recording assistant (9)

== Charts ==
Chart performance for Featuring Ty Dolla Sign
Chart (2020)	Peak position
Australian Albums (ARIA)	52
Belgian Albums (Ultratop Flanders)	125
Belgian Albums (Ultratop Wallonia)	175
Canadian Albums (Billboard)	5
Dutch Albums (Album Top 100)	48
French Albums (SNEP)	87
New Zealand Albums (RMNZ)	28
Norwegian Albums (VG-lista)	14
Swiss Albums (Schweizer Hitparade)	63
UK Albums (Official Charts)	66
US Billboard 200	4
US Top R&B/Hip-Hop Albums (Billboard)	2

== Certifications ==
Certifications for Featuring Ty Dolla Sign
Region	Certification	Certified units/sales
New Zealand (RMNZ)	Gold	7,500^{‡}
^{‡} Sales+streaming figures based on certification alone.
