= 7 Series (EP) =

EP by Kid Ink
- Released: May 5, 2017
- Length: 26:33
- Label: Tha Alumni; 88 Classic; RCA
- Producer: A1 Bentley; Akeel Henry; DJ Mustard; Darnell Got It; Dez Wright; Dre Moon; DZL; Free School; Hitmaka; ISM; J-Holt; Joe Logic; Murda Beatz; OZ; RetroFuture

Kid Ink chronology
| RSS2 (2016) | 7 Series (2017) | Missed Calls (2018) |

Singles from 7 Series
- 1. "F with U" Released: April 7, 2017

7 Series is the second extended play by American rapper Kid Ink. It was released on May 5, 2017, by Tha Alumni Music Group, 88 Classic and RCA Records. It features guest appearances from Starrah, Ty Dolla Sign and 2 Chainz, with production from DJ Mustard, Murda Beatz, Dez Wright, and RetroFuture, among others.

== Singles ==
The lead single, "F With U" was released on April 7, 2017 and the music video was later released on May 4, 2017. Two promotional singles, "Lottery" and "Supersoaka" were released on April 21, 2017 and April 28, 2017, respectively.

== Track listing ==
Credits adapted from Tidal.

7 Series
| No. | Title | Writer(s) | Producer(s) | Length |
|---|---|---|---|---|
| 1. | "Supersoaka" | Brian Collins; Shane Lindstrom; Ozan Yildirim | Murda Beatz; OZ | 3:15 |
| 2. | "No Strings" (featuring Starrah) | Collins; Teddy Peña; Brittany Hazzard | RetroFuture | 3:31 |
| 3. | "F with U" (featuring Ty Dolla Sign) | Collins; Jordan Holt; Floyd Bentley; Christopher Dotson; Christian Ward; Melvin Moore; Joshua White; Tyrone Griffin, Jr.; Nija Charles; Tim Kelley; Ronald LaPread; Lionel Richie; Bob Robinson; Tamia Washington | DJ Mustard; J-Holt; Hitmaka | 3:00 |
| 4. | "Mochi" | Collins; Ishmael Montague; Michael Holmes; Akeel Henry | ISM; DZL; Akeel^{[a]} | 3:22 |
| 5. | "Sweet Chin Music" | Collins; Dylan Cleary-Krell | Dez Wright | 3:27 |
| 6. | "Bad Lil Vibe" | Collins; Holt; Major Myjah; Deion Gill; Jim Lavigne; Gabrielle Nowee | J-Holt | 3:33 |
| 7. | "Lottery" | Collins; Jean-Baptiste Kouame; Michael McHenry; Ryan Buendia; Darnell Donohue; Joseph Gallagher | Free School; Darnell Got It; Joe Logic | 3:24 |
| 8. | "Swish" (featuring 2 Chainz) (bonus track) | Collins; Andre Proctor; Bentley; Ward; Ngandu Kabamba; Maurice Simmonds; Gamal Lewis; Tauheed Epps; Moore | Dre Moon; Hitmaka; A1 Bentley | 3:02 |
| Total length: | | | | 26:33 |

Notes

- ^{^[a]} signifies a co-producer

Sample credits

- "F with U" contains an interpolation from "So into You", performed by Tamia

== Charts ==
| Chart | Peak position |
|---|---|
| US Billboard 200 | 200 |
| US Top R&B/Hip-Hop Albums | 32 |
| US Top Rap Albums | 30 |
