= Expensive (song) =

2020 single by Ty Dolla Sign featuring Nicki Minaj

Single by Ty Dolla Sign featuring Nicki Minaj

from the album Featuring Ty Dolla Sign
- Released: August 28, 2020
- Recorded: 2020
- Genre: Hip hop
- Length: 2:16
- Label: Atlantic
- Songwriters: Tyrone Griffin, Jr.; Onika Maraj; James Royo; Alexander Krashinsky; Jazaée De Waal; Jordan Jackson; Nye Lee Jr; William Van Zandt
- Producers: Ty Dolla Sign; BlueySport; Will VZ

Ty Dolla Sign singles chronology
"Yacht Club" (2020)	"Expensive" (2020)	"Hit Different" (2020)

Nicki Minaj singles chronology
"Move Ya Hips" (2020)	"Expensive" (2020)	"Oh My Gawd" (2020)

Music video
- "Expensive" on YouTube

"Expensive" is a song by the American singer Ty Dolla Sign featuring rapper Nicki Minaj. The song was released on August 28, 2020, as the second single from the album Featuring Ty Dolla Sign. The song was released alongside an official music video.

== Background ==
Ty previewed the record along with another off Dream House that featured the rapper YG on April 12, 2020. The original version of the song featured G-Eazy and leaked in full August 6, 2020. The final version with Minaj was released on August 28, 2020.

== Music video ==
The official music video coincided with the single release. It features Ty's girlfriend coming home with a luxury vehicle full of gifts and wrapped boxes. Due to her pregnancy, Minaj uses green screen technology and only appears from the waist up.

== Personnel ==
Credits adapted from Tidal.

- Ty Dolla Sign – lead artist, producer
- Nicki Minaj – featured artist
- OkayJJack – additional production
- BlueySport – producer
- WILLVZ – producer
- James Royo – producer
- Nicolas De Porcel - mastering
- Mixed by Ali - mixing

== Charts ==
Chart (2020)	Peak position
New Zealand Hot Singles (RMNZ)	19
US Billboard Hot 100	83
US Hot R&B/Hip-Hop Songs (Billboard)	27
US Rhythmic Airplay (Billboard)	31
US Rolling Stone Top 100	71

== Release history ==
Release dates and formats for "Expensive"
Region	Date	Format	Label	Ref.
Various	August 28, 2020	Digital download; streaming	Atlantic	
