= Midnight Hour (Skrillex, Boys Noize and Ty Dolla Sign song) =

Single by Skrillex, Boys Noize and Ty Dolla Sign
- Released: August 29, 2019
- Genre: House
- Length: 3:18
- Label: Atlantic; Owsla
- Songwriter(s): Sonny Moore; Alex Ridha; Tyrone Griffin Jr; Anthony Clemons Jr.; Austin Owens; Isaac Earl Bynum; James Foye iii; Jatavia Johnson; Miles McCollum; Ryan Leslie
- Producer(s): Skrillex; Boys Noize

Skrillex singles chronology
"Two Nights Part II" (2019)	"Midnight Hour" (2019)

Ty Dolla Sign singles chronology
"Treehouse" (2019)	"Midnight Hour" (2019)	"Ego Death" (2020)

"Midnight Hour" is a song by American record producer Skrillex, German DJ Boys Noize and American singer Ty Dolla Sign. It was released on August 29, 2019, via Owsla and Atlantic. It was nominated for Best Dance Recording at the 2020 Grammy Awards.

== Background ==
In earlier August 2019, Skrillex post on Instagram and shared a video of 'Midnight Hour' with the caption "soon", after the track was first heard at Miami Music Week. The single was also accidentally leaked online prior to the official release date.

== Composition ==
According to Billboard, 'Midnight Hour' is a musical composite that combine R&B, electro, hip-hop and steady house beat.

== Charts ==
=== Weekly charts ===
Chart (2019)	Peak position
New Zealand Hot Singles (RMNZ)	37
US Hot Dance/Electronic Songs (Billboard)	17

=== Year-end charts ===
Chart (2019)	Position
US Hot Dance/Electronic Songs (Billboard)	100
