= Talk About It in the Morning =

EP by Wiz Khalifa and Ty Dolla Sign
- Released: March 31, 2015
- Recorded: 2014–15
- Genre: Hip-hop
- Length: 26:02
- Label: Taylor Gang
- Producer: Ty Dolla Sign; Wiz Khalifa (exec.); Cardo; Nice Rec; The BMMB

Talk About It in the Morning is a collaborative EP by American rapper Wiz Khalifa and American singer Ty Dolla Sign. It was released on March 31, 2015.

== Track listing ==
No.	Title	Producer(s)	Length
1.	"Judge It"	The BMMB	3:04
2.	"Refresh"	Nice Rec	3:08
3.	"Say No More"	Nice Rec	5:29
4.	"Post Up"	Ty Dolla Sign	3:42
5.	"Pretty Nights"	The BMMB	4:42
