= Hit Different =

2020 single by SZA featuring Ty Dolla Sign

Single by SZA featuring Ty Dolla Sign
- Released: September 4, 2020
- Recorded: February 2020
- Studio: DJ Khaled's house
- Genre: R&B
- Length: 3:22
- Label: Top Dawg; RCA
- Songwriters: Solána Rowe; Tyrone Griffin Jr.; Pharrell Williams; Chad Hugo; Robert Bisel; Anthony Clemons
- Producers: The Neptunes; Rob Bisel

SZA singles chronology
"The Other Side" (2020)	"Hit Different" (2020)	"Good Days" (2020)

Ty Dolla Sign singles chronology
"Expensive" (2020)	"Hit Different" (2020)	"Oops (I'm Sorry)" (2020)

"Hit Different" is a single by American singer-songwriter SZA featuring American singer Ty Dolla Sign. The two wrote the song with Rob Bisel and producers the Neptunes. It was recorded at the home of producer DJ Khaled and released through Top Dawg Entertainment on September 4, 2020, days after SZA posted on social media suggesting that the record label had been intentionally pushing back the release date of her music. It is an R&B torch song about a dysfunctional but tempting relationship.

"Hit Different" was met with generally positive reviews from music critics, who commended the song's nostalgic musical structure and SZA's writing. "Hit Different" was included on several publications' year-end lists of the best songs of the year, including those of NPR and Consequence of Sound. The song peaked at number 29 on the Billboard Hot 100, giving SZA her highest debut on the chart, and made appearances on Australian and UK charts. The accompanying music video, directed by SZA, shows the singer dancing in various settings, before ending with a snippet of successor single "Good Days".

== Background and composition ==
"Hit Different" saw SZA's first release as the sole lead artist since her 2017 album Ctrl. The song came less than a month after SZA claimed in a series of tweets that Top Dawg Entertainment head Punch had been purposely delaying the release of her new music, calling their relationship "hostile" and spawning the "#FreeSZA" hashtag on Twitter. In an interview with Zane Lowe for Apple Music, she revealed that she had recorded the song at DJ Khaled's house while he was performing at the Super Bowl LIV preshow. Speaking in the same interview about the song, she said, "I just wanted to give people something just to vibe because I have so much stuff that I'm just done holding onto." She also expressed that she was hesitant to release the single, telling Lowe, "I was crying with [my] mom because I haven't dropped anything in so long and I just feel like the anxiety...Sometimes I'm strong enough to just drop something and then two weeks passes, and then I'm not strong anymore."

"Hit Different" is an R&B song. It begins with Pharrell's trademark "four-count" and features a chorus sung by Ty Dolla Sign. SZA's voice on the song has been described as "silky" and "dreamy", while Ty's voice has been described as a "coo". Lyrically, "Hit Different" is a torch song which details a dysfunctional relationship with an emotionally distant partner to whom she keeps returning. Her worries about this person are emphasized in the lyrics: "Can't trust decision when you near me/Get myself caught in your crossfire".

== Release and reception ==
The single received little promotion prior to its release other than a screenshot from the song's music video posted to SZA's Twitter and Instagram featuring SZA covered in fake blood with the caption "Midnight EST" less than 90 minutes before it was released. Following the song's release, SZA posted a snippet of another unreleased song to her Instagram, captioning the video, "Punch gon kill me but I'm in a sharing mood".

Writing for Vulture, Craig Jenkins called "Hit Different" "fresh and fuss-free", writing, "'Hit Different' is both cogent mainstream music and slyly referential art." NPR's Lars Gotrich reacted positively to the song, writing, "With nostalgic production by the Neptunes, ['Hit Different'] hits that tender spot that made SZA's 2017 debut, Ctrl, hit so hard." Multiple critics noted her "signature cool" on the track. In its opening week, Hit Different garnered 13.3 million streams and 6,000 digital downloads in the US, debuting at number 29 on the Billboard Hot 100 (marking SZA's highest debut on the chart and her first song to debut in the top-40) and at number three on the Billboard Hot R&B Songs chart.

=== Accolades ===
"Hit Different" was included on several publications' year-end lists of the best songs of the year, including NPR at number 20 and Consequence of Sound at number 22.

== Music video ==
The song's music video was directed by SZA, making it her directorial debut, and released alongside the single itself. It depicts SZA dancing in a number of different settings and outfits, including in a junkyard surrounded by backup dancers wearing "Aaliyah-inspired" neon orange crop tops and baggy pants; in a barn filled with white animals; in an empty field; on top of a haystack wearing an oversized tie-dye shirt; in a parking garage wearing an Ottolinger bra and shirt with a Renaissance art-inspired pattern; and in the back of a pickup truck. Throughout the video, flashes of her covered in blood appear. Towards the second half of the video, the song changes to a different song titled "Good Days", an "ambient chill" ballad made alongside Jacob Collier, while the video shows SZA sitting on top of a pommel horse sporting a bikini and wooden beaded braids.

Joshua Espinoza of Complex stated, "Though it may sound a little random, the video is striking and pairs perfectly with the smooth, laid back record." Erica Gonzales of Harper's Bazaar remarked that SZA exuded "her cool girl swagger" in the video, calling the sets "visually stunning". Spin's Brenton Blanchet called the video's choreography "expert-level". Writing for The Fader, Shaad D'Souza called the video "gorgeous". Craig Jenkins of Vulture said, "The visual callbacks are vast and smart," comparing the scenes in the music video to a number of different films, including Sympathy for the Devil, Beloved, and When I Get Home, and comparing her beaded braids to those of singer Patrice Rushen. Lindsay Zoladz of The New York Times called the video "stylish" and "striking". MTV's Patrick Hosken called the video "remarkably visionary", adding, "By the end, both the tune and the visuals move on to another element that just may tie in both worlds of ruined metal and organic nature." Shannon J. Effinger of Pitchfork compared the music video to that of "Rock the Boat" by Aaliyah.

Upon release, singer Drake showed praise towards the visual, posting a screenshot on his Instagram story and writing, "Solana is the chefs [sic] kiss".

== Track listing ==
- Digital download
1. "Hit Different" – 3:22

== Credits and personnel ==
Credits adapted from Tidal.

- Solána Rowe – vocals, songwriting
- Tyrone Griffin, Jr. – vocals, songwriting
- The Neptunes – production, songwriting
- Rob Bisel – miscellaneous production, recording, songwriting
- Ben "Bengineer" Sedano – assistant engineering
- Curtis "Sircut" Bye – assistant engineering
- Jonathan Pfarr – assistant engineering
- Nick Valentin – assistant engineering
- Nicolas De Porcel – mastering
- Derek "MixedByAli" Ali – mixing
- Kaushlesh "Garry" Purohit – recording
- Mike Larson – recording

== Charts ==
=== Weekly charts ===
Weekly chart performance for "Hit Different"
Chart (2020–2021)	Peak position
Australia (ARIA)	84
Canada Hot 100 (Billboard)	55
Global 200 (Billboard)	36
New Zealand Hot Singles (RMNZ)	2
UK Singles (Official Charts)	55
US Billboard Hot 100	29
US Hot R&B/Hip-Hop Songs (Billboard)	12
US R&B/Hip-Hop Airplay (Billboard)	7
US Rhythmic Airplay (Billboard)	27
US Rolling Stone Top 100	10

=== Year-end charts ===
Year-end chart performance for "Hit Different"
Chart (2021)	Position
US Hot R&B/Hip-Hop Songs (Billboard)	90

== Certifications ==
Certifications for "Hit Different"
Region	Certification	Certified units/sales
United Kingdom (BPI)	Silver	200,000^{‡}
United States (RIAA)	3× Platinum	3,000,000^{‡}
^{‡} Sales+streaming figures based on certification alone.

== Release history ==
Release history for "Hit Different"
Region	Date	Format	Label	Ref.
Various	September 4, 2020	Digital download; streaming	Top Dawg; RCA	
United States	October 20, 2020	Urban adult contemporary	Top Dawg; RCA	
