= F with U =

Single by Kid Ink featuring Ty Dolla Sign

from the EP 7 Series
- Released: April 7, 2017
- Length: 2:59
- Label: Tha Alumni Music Group; 88 Classic; RCA
- Songwriter(s): Brian Collins; Tyrone Griffin Jr.; Dijon McFarlane; Tim Kelley; Bob Robinson
- Producer(s): DJ Mustard; J Holt; Hitmaka

Kid Ink singles chronology
| "Touch" (2017) | "F with U" (2017) | "Tell Somebody" (2018) |

Ty Dolla Sign singles chronology
| "Vitamin D" (2017) | "F with U" (2017) | "Whatever You Need" (2017) |

Music video
- "F with U" on YouTube

"F with U" is a song by American rapper Kid Ink featuring American singer Ty Dolla $ign. The song was released on April 7, 2017 by Tha Alumni Music Group, 88 Classic, and RCA Records, as the lead single from the former's EP 7 Series (2017). Produced by frequent collaborators DJ Mustard and J Holt, along with Hitmaka, the song interpolates Tamia's "So Into You" as its chorus.

== Music video ==
The music video was released May 4, 2017. Amber Rose made a cameo.

== Charts ==
=== Weekly charts ===
| Chart (2017) | Peak position |
|---|---|
| UK Singles (OCC) | 52 |
| UK Singles Downloads (OCC) | 98 |
| US Bubbling Under R&B/Hip-Hop Singles (Billboard) | 9 |
| US Rhythmic (Billboard) | 11 |

=== Year-end charts ===
| Chart (2017) | Position |
|---|---|
| US Rhythmic (Billboard) | 49 |

== Certifications ==
| Region | Certification | Certified units/sales |
|---|---|---|
| New Zealand (RMNZ) | Gold | 15,000^{‡} |
| United States (RIAA) | Gold | 500,000^{‡} |
^{‡} Sales+streaming figures based on certification alone.
