= Spicy (Ty Dolla Sign song) =

2020 single by Ty Dolla Sign featuring Post Malone

Single by Ty Dolla Sign featuring Post Malone

from the album Featuring Ty Dolla Sign
- Released: October 21, 2020
- Length: 2:23
- Label: Atlantic
- Songwriters: Tyrone Griffin, Jr.; Austin Post; James Royo; Westen Weiss; Glenda Proby; Nye Lee, Jr.
- Producers: Ty Dolla Sign; Damn James; Weiss

Ty Dolla Sign singles chronology
"Oops (I'm Sorry)" (2020)	"Spicy" (2020)	"The Business Part II" (2021)

Post Malone singles chronology
"Wolves" (2020)	"Spicy" (2020)	"Only Wanna Be With You (Pokémon 25 Version)" (2021)

Music video
- "Spicy" on YouTube

"Spicy" is a song by American singer Ty Dolla Sign featuring fellow American singer and rapper Post Malone. It was released as the third single from the former's third studio album, Featuring Ty Dolla Sign, on October 21, 2020. The single was released only two days before the album. The song marks the second collaboration between the artists, after the chart-topping "Psycho" in 2018. On January 29, 2021, a remix of the song was released, which adds appearances from Colombian singer J Balvin and fellow American rappers YG and Tyga.

== Background ==
In an Instagram post, Ty Dolla Sign wrote about his collaboration with Post Malone on the song:

You know, that magic that only that person could bring to the song. And "Spicy" was no different. This song needed Post's frequency. Plus, we were overdue for another hit after "Psycho." I'm just grateful that he lent his frequency to this song because we DEFINITELY got another one on our hands. Shout out to my brother Posty!

== Composition ==
The song features a "hypnotic and lively" instrumental, with a "heavy low end groove topped with swirling synths and a delicate acoustic guitar loop". In "hazy" vocals, Ty Dolla Sign and Post Malone "sing-rap horny strip-club stuff."

== Music video ==
The official music video for the song was directed by James Larese and was released on November 25, 2020. The Western-inspired visual features narration from Snoop Dogg, who begins a story of how Ty Dolla Sign gets his lover back from a gang of outlaws at the start of the video. The video is set in the Wild West, but features futuristic elements such as robotic horses. Ty ends up at a saloon, where he finds Post Malone in a card game with outlaws. He and Post team up to start a brawl with the gang, and he sees their leader holding his girlfriend hostage. Ty Dolla Sign transforms his guitar case into a bazooka, kills him and rescues the woman.

== Charts ==
Chart (2020)	Peak position
Australia (ARIA)	68
Canada Hot 100 (Billboard)	29
Germany (GfK)	92
Netherlands (Single Top 100)	97
Norway (VG-lista)	40
Portugal (AFP)	117
Romania (Airplay 100)	94
Sweden (Sverigetopplistan)	100
Switzerland (Schweizer Hitparade)	72
UK Singles (OCC)	71
US Billboard Hot 100	53
US Hot R&B/Hip-Hop Songs (Billboard)	18
US Rhythmic Airplay (Billboard)	16

== Certifications ==
Region	Certification	Certified units/sales
New Zealand (RMNZ)	Platinum	30,000^{‡}
^{‡} Sales+streaming figures based on certification alone.
