= Can U Be =

2024 American hip-hop song

Song by ¥$ and Travis Scott

from the album Vultures 2 (Digital Deluxe Album 5)
- Released: August 8, 2024
- Recorded: 2014–2015; 2024
- Studio: Jungle City (California and New York); Ameryacan (California)
- Genre: Alternative hip-hop
- Length: 3:30 (October 15 update); 4:00 (original version)
- Songwriters: Ye; Tyrone Griffin Jr.; Jacques Webster; Kejuan Muchita; Christopher Dotson; Andrew Neely; Ariel Imani
- Producers: Ye; Havoc

"Can U Be" (originally known as "Pressure" and "Never Let Me Go") is a song by American hip-hop supergroup ¥$, composed of rapper Kanye West and singer Ty Dolla Sign, featuring American rapper Travis Scott. The song, an alternative hip-hop record, was written by the duo and Scott alongside Chrishan, Andrew Neely of They, Ariel Imani, and the song's producer, Havoc of Mobb Deep. The track was recorded from 2014 to 2024, at both Jungle City Studios in California and New York City and Ameryacan in California.

"Can U Be" was initially previewed in 2015, with multiple snippets and different versions of the song being leaked online from 2017 to 2024, with one version being obtained by popular streamer Adin Ross. However, a full version of the track was not made available until May 26, 2024, when a group of fans organized a crowdfunding campaign and raised $25,000 to purchase the song from a music leaker. The song was officially released on August 8, 2024, on the fifth digital deluxe edition of their second studio album, Vultures 2 (2024), through YZY.

== Background and leaks ==
"Can U Be" was first publicly previewed in June 2015, showing a video of West dancing to the song. The track was originally intended to be included on West's seventh studio album, The Life of Pablo (2016), but was ultimately scrapped. According to producer Keyon Christ, who was heavily involved in the album, West and executive producer Southside felt that the song no longer fit the album's sound, which ditched its "futuristic" style after Metro Boomin and Southside convinced West to give the album "a mainstream-friendly 808 sound."

In June 2017, Music Mafia, a collective of music leakers, leaked two songs by West alongside a snippet of "Can U Be". Their website, which hosted a variety of unreleased music by various artists, had a bitcoin wallet dedicated to the song. As of June 2017, the wallet had a balance of 0.00729563 BTC (~$19), which Music Mafia stated was 5 percent of the amount needed to leak the song in full. Andy Cush of Spin estimated that the finished transaction would've been worth $400. The song ultimately failed to reach its goal, and would remain unleaked. In December 2021, Keyon Christ released a non-fungible token (NFT) called "Can U Be/Forever Mitus" as part of a series called "2044: The Lost Kanye Files", which contained several unused beats he created for West. Despite advertising itself as merging the two then-unreleased songs together, no elements of "Can U Be" are present, and Keyon Christ has never been credited as a producer on the track. The NFT has since been renamed to simply "Forever Mitus".

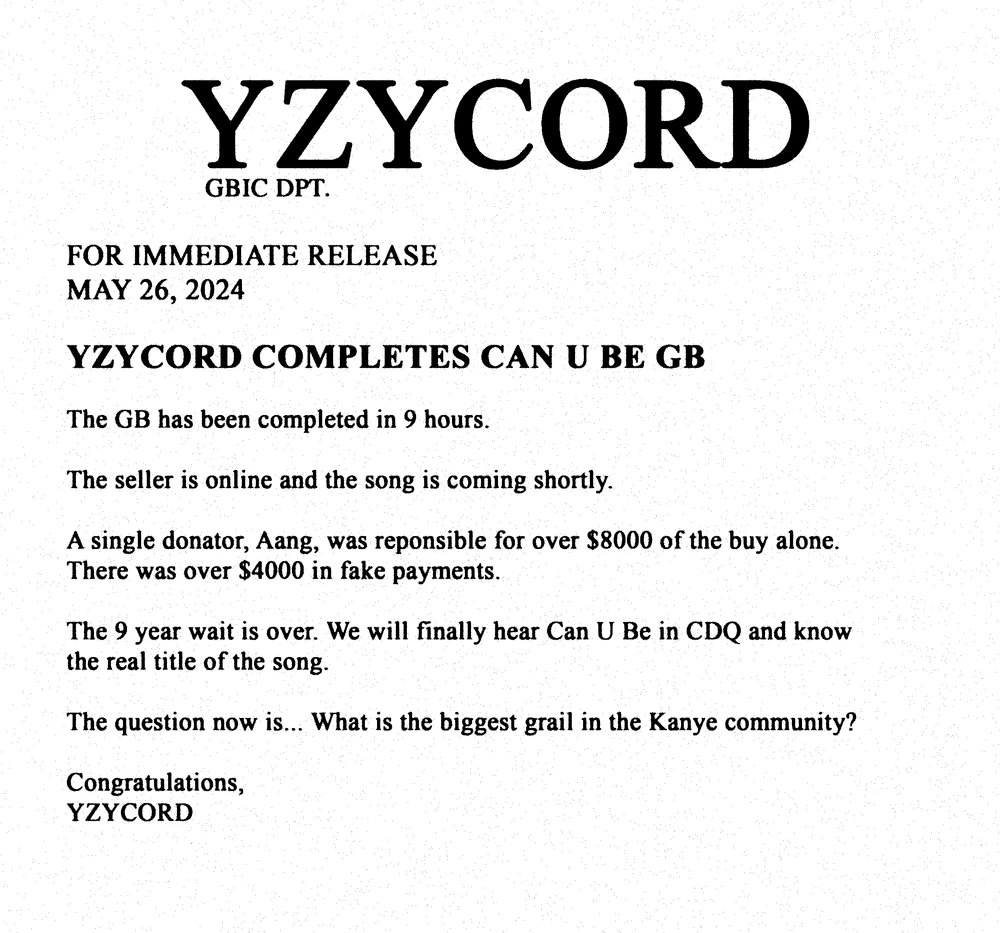
Image created by the West fan Discord server YZYCord, made after the funds needed to purchase "Can U Be" were successfully raised.

In November 2023, American streamer Adin Ross claimed to have purchased the full song for $200,000, before realizing he was scammed and it was a product of artificial intelligence; Scott's bridge was re-recorded by an unknown third party using AI deepfake software. In May 2024, Ross claimed that West himself had given him the full version of the song. He subsequently previewed a higher quality version of the track, which included new lyrics not present in other versions. On May 26, 2024, a crowdfunding campaign (referred to as "group buys" in music circles) was started on the online messaging platform Discord in order to purchase the song from a music leaker for $25,000. The goal was reached the same day, and "Can U Be" was heard in full for the first time, alongside over 100 unreleased songs by other artists. The full leak came with the song's stems, allowing anyone to make their own custom version by rearranging or reworking its elements.

== Composition ==
"Can U Be" opens with an excerpt of dialogue from the 2012 film Silver Linings Playbook. A vocal sample from the song "Stop, Look, Listen (to Your Heart)", as performed by Diana Ross and Marvin Gaye, is prominently used.

== Release ==
"Can U Be" was officially released on August 8, 2024, on a digital deluxe edition of Vultures 2 through West's website for $5, where the song, alongside four other deluxe versions of Vultures 2, would be subsequently updated. The original upload of the song, emailed to those bought the deluxe, was two and a half minutes in length and featured an additional verse from Ty Dolla Sign. On September 15, 2024, West held a Vultures 2 listening party at the Wuyuan River Stadium in Haikou, China, where he played an updated version of "Can U Be". A month later on October 15, the song was updated on YouTube Music, changing its length and mixing.
