= Slide (¥$ song) =

2024 song by Kanye West and Ty Dolla Sign

Single by ¥$

from the album Vultures 2
- Released: August 2, 2024
- Recorded: 2023
- Genre: Hip house
- Length: 3:18
- Label: YZY
- Songwriters: Ye; Tyrone Griffin Jr.; Apollo Parker; Arturo Fratini; Aswad Asif; Cydel Young; Frederick Gibson; Leon Thomas III; London Holmes; Peter Lee Johnson; Ryder Bucaro; Samuel Lindley
- Producers: Ye; Ty Dolla Sign; Apollo Parker; AyoAA; the Legendary Traxster; Leon Thomas III; Lester Nowhere; London on da Track; Peter Lee Johnson; Ryderoncrack

¥$ singles chronology
"Carnival" (2024)	"Slide" (2024)

Kanye West singles chronology
"No Apologies" (2024)	"Slide" (2024)	"Wheels Fall Off" (2025)

Ty Dolla Sign singles chronology
"Gimme a Second 2" (2024)	"Slide" (2024)	"Wheels Fall Off" (2025)

Music video
- "Slide" on YouTube

"Slide" (stylized in all caps) is a hip house song by the American hip-hop superduo ¥$, composed of rapper Kanye West and singer Ty Dolla Sign, from their second studio album, Vultures 2 (2024). It was released through YZY on August 2, 2024, as the lead single from the album. The duo recorded it in 2023, writing it alongside Apollo Parker, AyoAA, the Legendary Traxster, Leon Thomas III, Lester Nowhere, London on da Track, Peter Lee Johnson, Ryderoncrack, Cyhi the Prynce, and Fred Again, producing it with the former eight.

Before its release, "Slide" was rumored to feature vocals from English singer-songwriter James Blake and production by English producer Fred Again; the latter played the song at multiple live events prior to its release. Upon its release, the song was positively received by music critics, and charted at number 88 on the Billboard Hot 100, alongside charting worldwide. A music video, directed by West and American photographer Aus Taylor, was released on August 13, 2024.

== Background ==
"Slide" was first previewed during a September 2023 listening party at Le Baroque in Geneva, Switzerland. Fred Again also played the song during his November 2023 DJ sets at Shrine Expo Hall, calling it "madness for me" and stating that he "made this with my brother Ty a few months ago." Despite this, Fred Again is not credited on streaming services (though he is listed as a writer on ASCAP) and representatives for him have claimed he was not involved in the song's creation.

== Critical reception ==
"Slide"
Several reviewers compared the opening synths of "Slide" to THX's Deep Note.

"Slide" received generally positive reviews from music critics. Writing for HotNewHipHop, Gabriel Bras Nevares called it the "big highlight" of Vultures 2, praising how its synths open the song "in an immediate and captivating fashion." He also complimented its percussion, which he felt made it "one of the most uniquely groovy and enjoyable bounces on the album." HipHopDX's Sam Moore also called the song the high point of Vultures 2, noting how it sets up the rest of the album's 15 tracks. Though Moore praised the song's production, he criticized Ty Dolla Sign's verse as misogynistic. Stephen Kearse of Pitchfork compared the song's "staggering wall of sound" to THX's Deep Note, as did Nevares in his review. Paul Attard of Slant Magazine lauded "Slide" as a highlight of the Vultures series of albums, describing it as "a high-octane fever dream, with its pairing of squealing organs and a booming percussion section sounding straight-up cinematic."

Billboard's Michael Saponara ranked "Slide" as the second best song on Vultures 2. He wrote that the song's "ominous organs" would make fans feel as if they were experiencing "the rollercoaster ride of a lifetime or having their tickets punched to the next Marvel movie." Ben Beaumont-Thomas of The Guardian singled out the song as an instance of West having an "inventive flow" on the album, which to him was a rarity. He described West's flow as him "asymmetrically press[ing] words on to [the song's] seasick beat."

== Commercial performance ==
In the United States, the single charted at number 88 on the Billboard Hot 100 and peaked at number 25 on the Hot R&B/Hip-Hop Songs chart. In the United Kingdom, the single charted at number 92 on the UK Singles Chart and peaked at number 32 on the UK Independent Singles Chart. In Canada, the single charted at number 84 on the Canadian Hot 100. It also charted at number 84 on the Irish Singles Chart. In New Zealand, the single charted at number 4 on the New Zealand Hot Singles Chart, its highest peak on any chart it made. The single also charted at number 154 on the Billboard Global 200.

== Music video ==
=== Background and synopsis ===
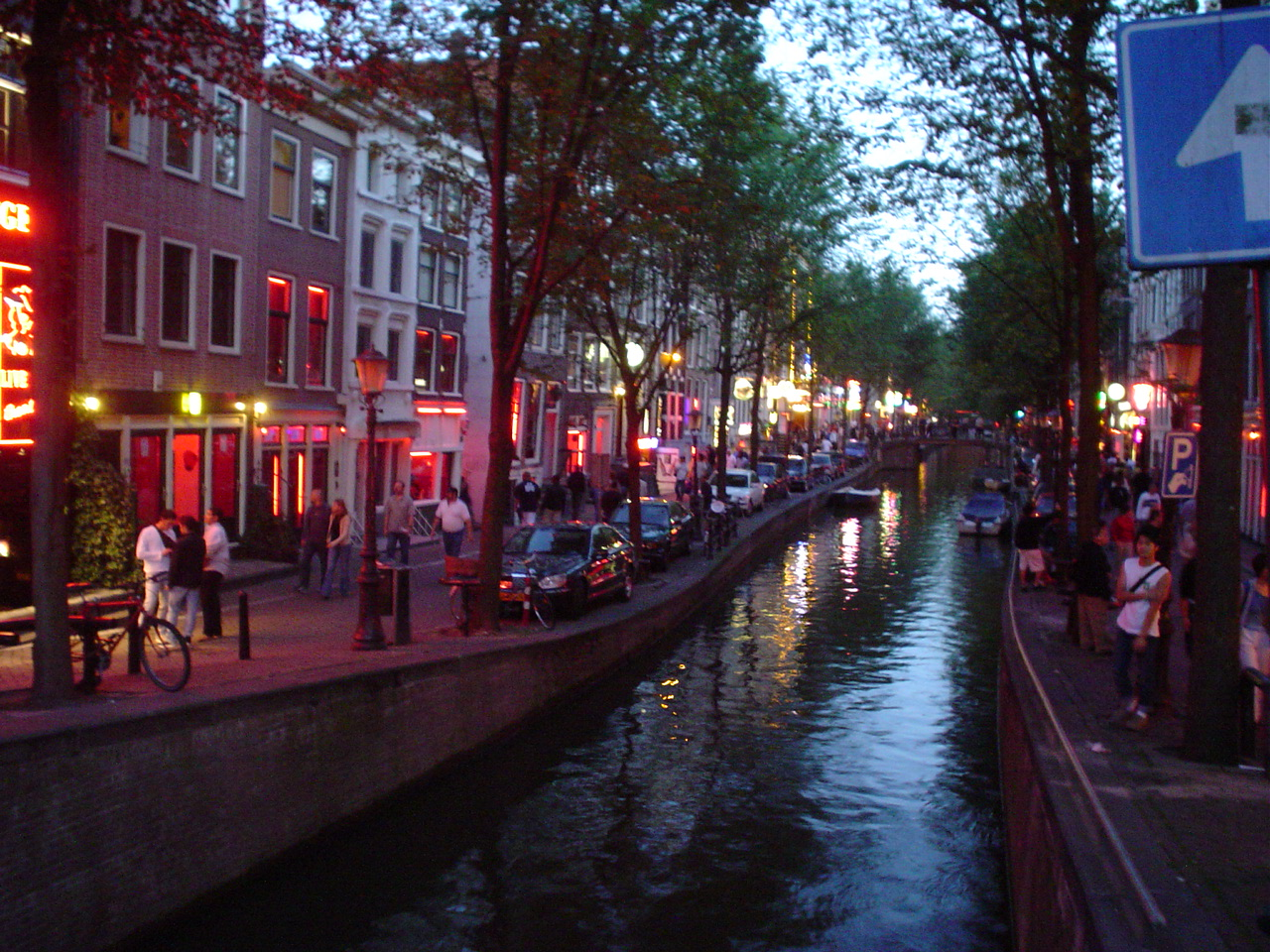
The visuals featured in the music video for "Slide" are reminiscent of red-light districts, such as De Wallen (pictured).

On August 13, 2024, the music video for "Slide", directed by West and American photographer Aus Taylor, was released onto YouTube. West began collaborating with Taylor while working on Vultures 1 (2024), with Taylor having shot the album's cover art. In an interview with 032c, Taylor described his relationship with West as "deep", finding that such relationships were hard to find with most artists.

West and Ty Dolla Sign do not feature in the video. Filmed in black-and-white and shot with 4-Perf 35 mm film, the video was uses a singular, side-angle shot for its runtime. The video mostly features women, many of which are scantily clad. They are seen either hanging around the sidewalks or talking to men, who are implied to be their clients. Taylor described the video as "a portrait of the blade", a strip of road associated with prostitution. The setting appears run-down, as homeless people in tents and burning cars are visible throughout. A vulture can be seen in the video, referencing the title of the album.

=== Reception ===
In the 032c interview with Taylor, Claire Koron Elat praised the music video, saying that it "looks at class division and societal issues from an artistic vantage point, aesthetically transforming forms of struggle without ever simply surrendering to beauty." For HotNewHipHop, Elias Andrews compared it to the music video for West's 2012 single "No Church In the Wild", noting that both depict "societal chaos."

=== Credits ===
- Kanye West – director
- Aus Taylor – director
- Xiaolong Liu – director of photography
- Yerlan Tanayev – colorist

== Charts ==
Chart performance for "Slide"
Chart (2024)	Peak position
Canada Hot 100 (Billboard)	84
Global 200 (Billboard)	154
Ireland (IRMA)	84
New Zealand Hot Singles (RMNZ)	4
UK Singles (Official Charts)	92
UK Indie (Official Charts)	32
US Billboard Hot 100	88
US Hot R&B/Hip-Hop Songs (Billboard)	25
