= Vultures 2 =

2024 album by Kanye West and Ty Dolla $ign

Studio album by ¥$
- Released: August 3, 2024
- Recorded: 2014–2024
- Genres: Hip-hop; R&B; house; trap
- Length: 49:48
- Label: YZY
- Producers: Ye; Ty Dolla Sign; 88-Keys; Adam Vadel; Angel Lopez; ATL Jacob; Apollo Parker; Audiovista; AyoAA; BoogzDaBeast; Camper; Chrishan; Cruza; Damn James!; Deaton Chris Anthony; Dez Wright; DrtWrk; EJPXris; E*vax; Federico Vindver; Flex OTB; FnZ; Foreverolling; Gabe Shaddow; Gren808; Havoc; JPEGMafia; the Legendary Traxster; Leon Thomas III; Lester Nowhere; Listen2Tish; London on da Track; Mark Byrd; Morning Estrada; Nathan Butts; No I.D.; Noah Madrid; Oscar Adler; Outtatown; Peter Lee Johnson; Pi'erre Bourne; Rory Noble; Ryderoncrack; Scott Bridgeway; Sean Momberger; Shdøw; Stephen Blake Kanicka; Taydex; Tech Club; TheLabCook; Timbaland; Wes Singerman; Wheezy; Yseult

¥$ chronology
Vultures 1 (2024)	Vultures 2 (2024)

Kanye West chronology
Vultures 1 (2024)	Vultures 2 (2024)	Bully (2026)

Ty Dolla Sign chronology
Vultures 1 (2024)	Vultures 2 (2024)	Tycoon (2025)

Singles from Vultures 2
- 1. "Slide" Released: August 2, 2024

Vultures 2 (stylized in all caps) is the second studio album by the American hip-hop supergroup ¥$, composed of rapper Kanye West and singer Ty Dolla $ign. It was released independently by the former's YZY record label on August 3, 2024. Guest performances include Don Toliver, Playboi Carti, Kodak Black, Future, Lil Durk, Lil Baby, Yuno Miles, West's daughters North and Chicago, Young Thug, Lil Wayne, Desiigner, Cyhi the Prynce, 070 Shake, and Ty Dolla Sign's brother Big TC. The album's digital deluxe editions add guest vocals from Peso Pluma, Kodak Black, Kid Cudi, and Travis Scott.

Recording sessions were first held for the track "Can U Be" in 2014, four years before West started recording "Sky City", eight years before "530", and ten years before the finished album. West and Ty Dolla Sign focused on composing Vultures 2 with collaborators after the release of its predecessor in 2024; the rapper quickly backtracked on an announcement of retirement in July 2024. The former sustained multiple delays before release, with the performers initially considering issuing it exclusively on West's Yeezy website. In March 2024, audio rips of tracks such as "River" and "Promotion" were made available for streaming online. West and Ty Dolla Sign previewed tracks from the album at listening parties in the United States throughout the same month, before holding events in international locations like Goyang and Haikou during August and September.

Following the release of Vultures 2, West continuously updated the tracks. Encompassing hip-hop, R&B, house, and trap, it was noted for an unfinished sound. Themes of women, money, freedom, and redemption are present, while West portrays himself as a victim of others. A few hours before the album's release, "Slide" was issued as the lead single. A music video for the track "Fried" was also shared in August 2024. In November 2024, a video for "Bomb" was released, featuring a new rap verse from meme rapper Yuno Miles, which West had first premiered at a live show in August. The cover art for Vultures 2 features Ty Dolla Sign wearing an all-black costume while holding a picture of Big TC, who had been sentenced to life imprisonment for a murder they both deny that he had committed.

== Background and recording ==
Songs from the album were recorded off and on from 2014 to 2024. On January 23, 2024, West revealed that he would be releasing a Vultures series as a trilogy with Ty Dolla Sign, with the first set for release in February, the second on March 8, and the final on April 5. Vultures 1 was released after a slight delay as the first installment of the series on February 10, reaching number one on the US Billboard 200 and experiencing worldwide chart success. On February 25, 2024, Timbaland, who worked on the album, announced that the second installment was "on the way". On March 3, French Montana announced his involvement and shared a clip of himself with the duo in the recording studio. After Vultures 2 had not met its scheduled release five days later, West explained that he and Ty Dolla Sign were still recording in the studio.

On April 24, 2024, Rolling Stone confirmed a track entitled "Let Me Chill Out" had been recorded for the album, featuring the deceased rapper Takeoff with fellow rappers Rich the Kid and NBA Youngboy. On June 22, Ty Dolla Sign appeared on a cover story for Billboard and played some of the tracks from Vultures 2. The singer explained that all the songs were recorded, although him and West were still trying to "go bigger than the first album". On July 9, 2024, Rich the Kid shared an exchange of text messages where West announced that he was retiring from music. Rich the Kid argued to West that he was needed for music and his cultural impact, requesting for him to release Vultures 2. The announcement caused divided reactions amongst West's fans, with some disappointed in his retirement and others celebrating. Shortly after announcing his retirement, West returned to feature on frequent collaborator Consequence's track "No Apologies" on July 12, 2024.

Several songs on Vultures 2 had appeared on track lists for West's previous albums or been played during his listening events. West started recording "Can U Be" during the 2016 sessions for his seventh studio album The Life of Pablo, the same year that fellow rapper Travis Scott previewed it with a video of him. He stopped working on the track in 2017, although it experienced multiple internet leaks and became popular with his fans online. "Sky City" was reportedly recorded during the 2018 sessions for West's unreleased album Yandhi, having previously leaked online. "530" also leaked and appeared on a track list for his demo album Donda 2, recorded in 2022; the final version remained largely unchanged. "Slide" was previewed during multiple events in 2023, before appearing on a track list for Vultures 1 in 2024. A listening event was leaked in December 2023, where West and Ty Dolla Sign previewed "River". In January 2024, North West wore a T-shirt with an early track list for Vultures 1 that included songs such as "Time Moving Slow", "Promotion", "Dead" and "Take off Your Dress".

== Music and themes ==
=== Overview ===
Vultures 2 is a hip-hop, R&B, house, and trap album, incorporating avant-garde. It features a raw style, including prominent synths. Multiple publications noted the album's unfinished sound, comparing its songs to demotapes. The instrumentation at the start of Vultures 2 invokes the Deep Note of THX that is also used at the beginning of rapper and record producer Dr. Dre's 2001 (1999); West previously stated the album's track "Xxplosive" influenced his sound.

Ty Dolla Sign provides harmony with his singing throughout, while some tracks feature few vocals from West. Incomplete verses are delivered by West, who has been accused of using artificial intelligence (AI) for certain performances. Vultures 2 features themes of women, money, freedom, and redemption. West portrays his character as a victim of others, such as the music industry and his former wife Kim Kardashian. He depicts as the music industry not wanting him to succeed and himself a survivor of cancel culture, remaining in the spotlight.

=== Tracks 1–9 ===
The album's opening track, "Slide", begins with a cinematic sound that combines a booming percussion section with organs, alongside THX synths. Ty Dolla Sign performs first on the song as he delivers smooth soulful vocals, while West stands defiant in the face of industry opposition in a villainous tone. Resembling Donda 2 track "Flowers", "Time Moving Slow" features drum kicks and West declaring "I rewrote my ending". "Field Trip" is based on a sample of Portishead's "Machine Gun" (2008), which is combined with Kodak Black's vocals. The guest rappers have more vocals than West on the song, including fast rapping from Playboi Carti. "Fried" relies on chants that invoke Vultures 1 single "Carnival", with lyrics from West threatening people who consider becoming opposed to him and Ty Dolla Sign comparing himself to deceased rapper Tupac Shakur. The interlude "Isabella" follows, consisting of a rock sample. "Promotion" contains synth tones and drum sounds, alongside a lyrical reference from West to his 2007 single "Good Life". An introspective number, "530" features West lamenting over his relationship with ex-wife, Kim Kardashian. "Dead" includes booming drums and synth tones, with lyrics from West reflecting on a former lover after fellow rapper Future's verse. Future's voice is sequenced and he raps about his involvement with an Instagram model, while Ty Dolla Sign identifies himself as "the new [Hugh] Hef" and rapper Lil Durk engages in a call and response with the singer and West. "Forever Rolling" incorporates clattering drums in its grand production, opening with a verse from West calling out companies that parted ways with him. Lil Baby and Ty Dolla Sign deliver lines back and forth, focusing on staying together and making the most of life.

=== Tracks 10–16 ===
A bouncy track with a Jersey club beat, "Bomb" consists of bilingual rapping from Kanye's daughters North and Chicago West, the former of whom repeats greetings in Japanese. "River" prominently samples Leon Bridges' 2015 track of the same name and its first verse is performed by rapper Young Thug, who harmonizes at the start. The song is themed around the freedom of Young Thug and mobster Larry Hoover, marking a rare reference to the criminal justice system from West on the album. "Forever" contains elements of dance music, seeing West and Ty Dolla Sign focus on their desire for love. "Husband" features West depicting Kardashian as having needed their relationship to maintain her finances, expressing self-pity. West continues this subject matter into "Lifestyle", ridiculing women who envision a luxury lifestyle outside of their reach. The song features a verse from fellow rapper Lil Wayne about women's Brazilian butt lift, as well as a reference to West's rival Taylor Swift. "Sky City" is driven by lightly strummed electric guitar and changes the song structure from its original leak, while Ty Dolla Sign harmonizes the chorus of the Five Stairsteps' single "O-o-h Child" (1970). West raps incoherently on the song as he compares his brand Yeezy to liberation from "picking cotton", followed by associate and fellow rapper Cyhi the Prynce envisioning making visits to his ancestors. The closing track, "My Soul", sees West call out Adidas and address incarceration in the United States. Ty Dolla Sign delivers an emotional prayer to his brother Big TC, who harmonizes about the freedom of maintaining his Muslim faith in spite of imprisonment.

== Release and promotion ==
West shared the cover art for the album through his Twitter account on March 9, 2024, showing a masked figure standing in all-black outfit. The figure on the cover was revealed to be Ty Dolla Sign and he holds a photo of his brother Big TC, real name Jabreal Muhammad, who was given a 16-year prison sentence for a murder they both claim he did not commit. On March 10, 2024, in a conversation with a fan page, West mentioned that he would be selling Vultures 2 on his Yeezy website for $20 instead of releasing it on streaming platforms like Vultures 1. West thought streaming devalues music and is "basically pirating", offering that he could reach one million album sales from five percent of his then-20 million Instagram followers. He said the decision was made to stop streaming companies being "in control of the artist" and Ty Dolla Sign echoed West's views in spite of requests for the album to be streamed, declaring the release went against "what these streaming services want u to to [sic] believe so they can stay on top".

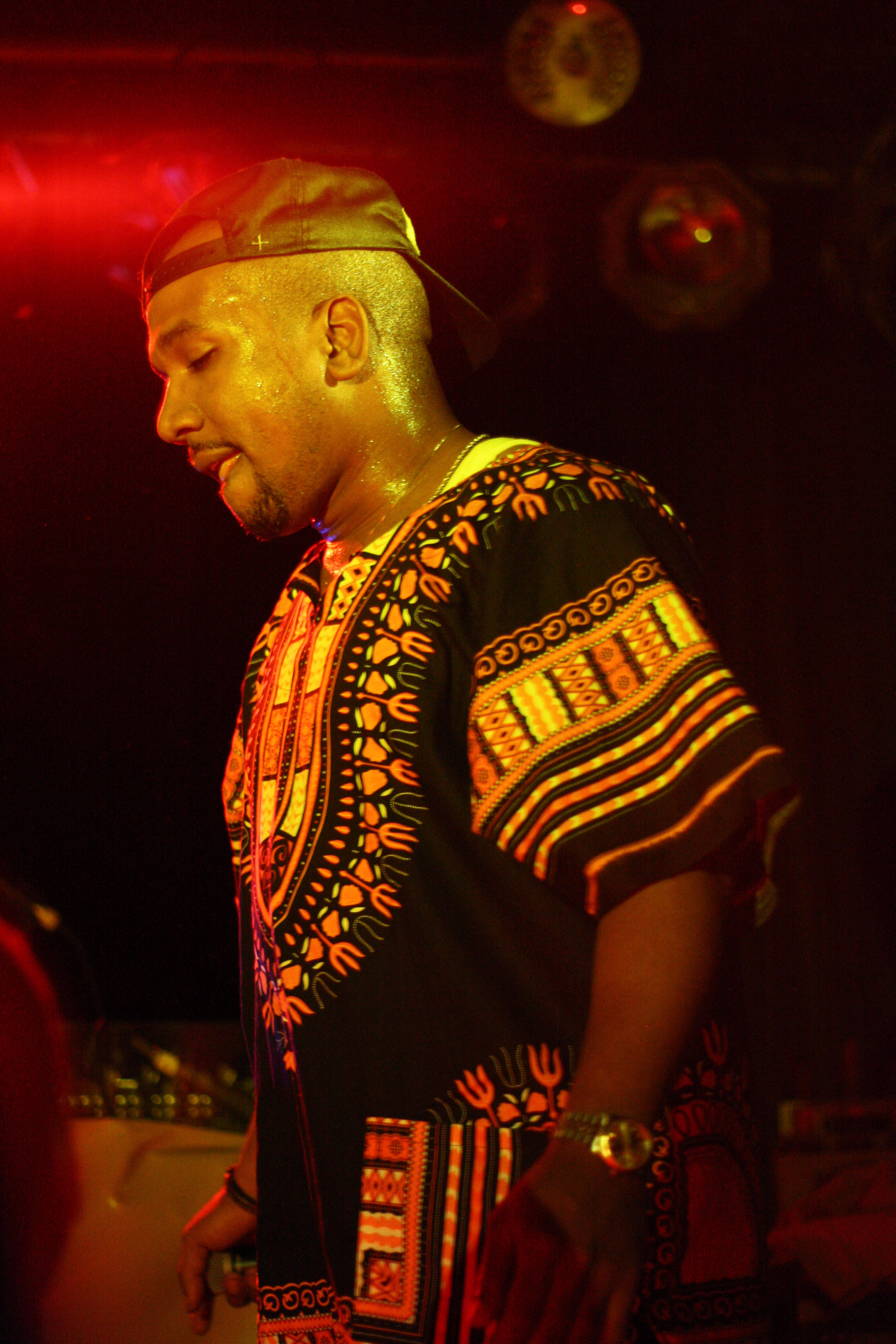
West's fans believed artificial intelligence was used to create his vocals on "Field Trip" and "Sky City", considering that guest vocalist Cyhi the Prynce stood in for West on the latter.

On March 14, 2024, audio rips of the tracks "River", "Everybody", "Worship", "Promotion", "Slide", and "Field Trip" were made available for streaming on Instagram and TikTok. During an appearance on Justin LaBoy's podcast, West announced a new release date of May 3, 2024, around two months later than the initially slated release. Vultures 2 missed the release date, with both West and Ty Dolla Sign largely silent on social media at this time. On July 30, West announced through his website that all the orders for the album placed had been fulfilled and shipped out, and that it would be released on August 2, 2024. However, hours later, the release date was removed from his website. On August 3, 2024, Vultures 2 was surprise released independently to streaming platforms such as Spotify and Apple Music by West's YZY brand. It was also made available on the iTunes Store, sold at a discounted price of $4.99 in the first week. Geoff Barrow of English band Portishead responded to the sample of their 2008 single "Machine Gun" on "Field Trip" by expressing disappointment that an artist used the song without permission again, as well as questioning why West can not "write his own beats". On August 4, 2024, Swsh posted that West had not cleared the sample of "Break the Fall (Acoustic)" for "530". Although they did not take issue with his usage, they later sued West in February 2026.

Following the album's release, fans of West accused him of using AI to create his vocals on "Field Trip" and "Sky City". They analyzed that his verse on the first song was recorded by Ty Dolla Sign and the verse on the latter was from Cyhi the Prynce, though noted that "Sky City" contained brief punching in that sounded authentic. Billboard's Michael Saponara observed West's "robotic flow" on "Sky City", but not on the verse that fans believed was AI. On August 7, 2024, the album's first deluxe edition was released, which featured updated songs and the bonus track "Take Off Your Dress". According to West's chief of staff, the track will eventually be made available on streaming platforms. On August 8, 2024, four additional deluxe editions were released with a bonus track for each: "Believer"; "Gun to My Head" featuring Kid Cudi; "Drunk" featuring Peso Pluma in place of Bad Bunny and Kodak Black; and "Can U Be" featuring Travis Scott. The five deluxe editions were sold through West's website, priced at $5 each and listeners received real-time updates of the songs.

On August 2, 2024, "Slide" was released through West's website and streaming services as the lead single from Vultures 2. Before its release, the song was rumored to feature vocals from British musician James Blake. It was released at night, a few hours before the album. An accompanying black-and-white music video was released on August 13, 2024, featuring women almost naked in a single side-angle shot. The song reached numbers 88 and 92 on the US Billboard Hot 100 and UK Singles Chart, respectively. On August 7, 2024, West shared an animated music video for "Fried" that depicts a group of masked individuals running around a concrete landscape. In November, a post-apocalyptic-inspired video for "Bomb" (featuring West's daughters North and Chicago) was released, featuring a rap verse from Yuno Miles.

=== Post-release updates ===
After fans complained about the mixing on Vultures 2 following its release, West announced that updates "will be published in real time", with no specified conclusion to potential revisions to the songs. West had previously updated his albums Yeezus (2013), The Life of Pablo (2016), Donda (2021), and Donda 2 (2022) (Note: Donda 2 initially released with four of the tracks available on February 23, 2022, one day before the album started to receive updates. Twelve more tracks were added to the "V2.22.22 Miami" version on February 24. However, one of the additional songs, "Keep It Burning" [sic], was removed from the Stem Player website and replaced with a stadium version of "True Love", which was then later replaced with "Eazy".) after their initial releases. Within the first few hours of Vultures 2 being released, the mixes, mastering, and vocals of songs were tweaked. For the first update on August 6, 2024, "River" received a new mix and drums, with sound effects removed too. "530" was provided with altered sound effects and some distorted vocals, as well as a pitched-up vocal bridge. "Fried" had a new mix and seemingly unmastered ad-libs (removed the day after), while "Field Trip", "Sky City", "Dead", and "Time Moving Slow" also received alterations. "My Soul" was remastered and rearranged, centering the mix due to complaints of the vocals being primarily in the left ear, and swapped the placements of West's and Ty Dolla Sign's verses; a rhythm created using sampled prison bars during Big TC's was added, having previously been heard in leaked versions of the song. On August 16, 2024, "Forever", originally titled "Maybe", had a new verse added. The verse sees West discussing the value of time on Earth, with its first part being taken from the original version.

== Listening events ==
During the listening events for Vultures 2, West and Ty Dolla Sign dressed in all-black outfits and wore masks, with the rapper wearing a hockey mask. The duo held a private listening party in Los Angeles on the album's original release date of March 8, 2024. The event featured a DJ setting and they mostly previewed new tracks, with West joined by his partner Bianca Censori. On March 10, 2024, West and Ty Dolla Sign held a listening party at Footprint Center in Phoenix, Arizona, where they played songs from the first two installments of the Vultures series on a stage with minimal lighting and backing from smoke. Two days later, the performers hosted a listening event for Vultures 1 at San Francisco's Chase Center, previewing tracks from the sequel. They arrived around 20 minutes late and North previewed her feature on the track "Matthew", which was expected to be included on Vultures 2. On April 2, 2024, a spokesperson for West told Billboard that the album's public listening parties across the US had been cancelled. However, tickets remained on sale for the event at the Pyramids of Giza in Egypt and the spokesperson insisted replacement dates would be announced.

On July 25, 2024, Ty Dolla Sign announced a listening event in Taiwan one month away, although it was reportedly cancelled four days beforehand. The singer also revealed that a listening experience would be held in Salt Lake City on August 9. The event was held at the city's Delta Center and alongside Vultures 2, songs were played from West's fifth studio album My Beautiful Dark Twisted Fantasy (2010) and The Life of Pablo. Towards the end, the rapper appeared maskless as he switched to an all-white attire. Censori was in attendance wearing a nude bodysuit, accompanied by her family members. On August 11, 2024, West previewed his unreleased collaboration "Alpha Omega" (fan-titled "Cash Cow") with British rapper Skepta at a private listening event in Los Angeles.

On August 23, 2024, West and Ty Dolla Sign hosted a listening event at the Goyang Stadium in Goyang, South Korea, marking the rapper's first concert in the country for 14 years. The accompanying merchandise included a T-shirt with the duo's two-headed eagle emblem, as well as a hoodie featuring the ¥$ logo at the chest and their Vultures logo on the back. West arrived on a white horse and performed a medley of more than 70 songs from across his career, including hit singles "Stronger" (2007), "Runaway" (2010), and "Famous" (2016). The rapper dedicated a performance of the 2007 song "I Wonder" to Drake, whom he has recurringly feuded with since 2018, and previewed an alternate version of "Bomb" that features vocals from rapper Yuno Miles. West added fellow rapper Joe Budden's name to the lyrics of his 2021 song "24" after Budden had criticized him, which he responded to by mocking him and insisting they are at peace. On August 30, 2024, West announced a listening party at a venue in Haikou, China, after having previously cancelled an event in the country's disputed territory Taiwan. The listening party was held at the city's Wuyuan River Stadium on September 15, 2024. West performed the unreleased Vultures 1 track "Everybody" as he was accompanied by his children North, Psalm, Chicago, and Saint, who held hands with each other. The crowd chanted "Fuck Adidas" during the event, as West acknowledged by raising his middle finger and then quipping if this was okay in reference to China's strict laws against obscenity.

== Critical reception ==
Professional ratings
Aggregate scores
Source	Rating
Metacritic	39/100
Review scores
Source	Rating
AllMusic	1.5/5 stars
The Guardian	2/5 stars
HipHopDX	2/5 stars
Pitchfork	4.6/10
Rolling Stone	2/5 stars
Slant Magazine	2/5 stars

According to the review aggregator Metacritic, Vultures 2 received "generally unfavorable reviews" based on a weighted average score of 39 out of 100 from 6 critic scores.

In a highly critical review, AllMusic's Fred Thomas disregarded the album as worse than Vultures 1 in terms of "listenability, charm, or staying power". Thomas opined that even the "scant elements that recall the long-faded glory of Kanye's best work" resemble a self-impersonation, calling it a forgettable album. Stephen Kearse from Pitchfork called the album "even shoddier in construction and execution than its predecessor" with a clear lack of purpose, praising the production and some guest appearances, despite the lack of any "vision or direction connecting all the moving parts". Providing a similar review at HotNewHipHop, Gabriel Bras Nevares said that the album's "greatest flaw is its hollow execution" and was disappointed with the lack of effort, unoriginality, and unclear purpose. He described the unfinished demos as seeming like "a scam tracklist" uploaded to a YouTube channel and found the lyrical themes poorly written, although he commended Ty Dolla Sign for being a more skilled performer than West at points and elements of the production. Writing for Rolling Stone, Mosi Reeves compared Vultures 2 to "second helpings of a memorably distasteful meal" and questioned unfollowing West's "shitty content", considering aspects like the demos and lyricism to be typical of him.

For HipHopDX, Sam Moore commented that West and Ty Dolla Sign have not established any chemistry, delivering a combination of "half-completed ideas and dueling demotapes". Even though Moore appreciated Ty Dolla Sign's vocals, he found the singer to seem anonymous and criticized West's lyricism; he finalized that the album is completely "devoid of substance". In Slant Magazine, Paul Attard said that even though West's albums are expected to be somewhat incomplete upon release, Vultures 2 is "in shambles" due to the "improper mixes", incomplete verses, and demo quality tracks. He felt that it sets a new limit of "West's methodology of pushing the limits of a deadline" and some tracks sound lazily executed as the album focuses more "on vibes and aesthetics than substance or emotion", noting West's ideas are not developed into songs and Ty Dolla Sign's good performances are neglected to a supporting role. The Guardian's Ben Beaumont-Thomas said that Vultures 2 follows West's "tried and tested current blend of edgelording and emotional candour", with the confusion echoed in the beats and musical style for going from clever details to mindless ones. Beaumont-Thomas concluded that the album is "bloated and occasionally focused, tired and occasionally futurist, morally redundant" with redemption lightly supplied by humility and he saw some of West's flows as inventive. In a mixed review, Billboard's Saponara asserted that the album has potential to be great and highlighted West's avant-garde production, although found it to be held back by instances of "sound quality issues, unfinished thoughts or portions when Ye's rapping dips".

== Commercial performance ==
Vultures 2 debuted at number two on the US Billboard 200 after a six-day tracking period, selling 107,000 album-equivalent units. This was higher than the 83,000 units predicted, although less than the 148,000 scored by Vultures 1. The first-week units consisted of 46,000 streaming-equivalent units, 60,500 pure album sales, and 500 track-equivalent units. The album also accumulated a total of 50.44 million on-demand streams of its songs. Vultures 2 was blocked from the top spot by Swift's 11th album The Tortured Poets Department. This prevented West from achieving his 12th number-one record and in an article for Billboard, Andrew Unterberger noted the significance of the release coming around 15 years after West's interruption of Swift at the 2009 MTV Video Music Awards and during the chart reign of her album for over three months. Vultures 2 topped the US Top R&B/Hip-Hop Albums chart, becoming Ty Dolla Sign's second number-one on the chart after its predecessor. This also marked West's 12th chart-topper, tying with R. Kelly for the fifth most on the chart. Nine of the songs entered the US Billboard Hot R&B/Hip-Hop Songs chart, with "Field Trip" charting the highest at number 10. During its second week, Vultures 2 dropped to only 31,000 units sold.

Elsewhere in North America, the album peaked at number one on the Canadian Albums Chart. Vultures 2 debuted at numbers three and four on the New Zealand Albums and ARIA Albums charts, respectively. In Europe, it reached number two on both the Norwegian Topp 40 Albums and Swiss Albums Top 100 charts. The album further reached the top five in Iceland, Denmark, Poland, and Lithuania. It charted at number six in both Ireland and the Netherlands, while also attaining top 10 positions in Austria, Belgium's Flanders region, Portugal, the United Kingdom, the Czech Republic, Germany, and Sweden.

== Track listing ==
Credits adapted from Tidal.

Vultures 2 track listing
No.	Title	Writer(s)	Producer(s)	Length
1.	"Slide"	Ye; Tyrone Griffin Jr.; Aswad Asif; Arturo Fratini; Wesley Glass; Peter Lee Johnson; Samuel Lindley; Leon Thomas III	Ye; Ty Dolla $ign; AyoAA; Leon Thomas; Lester Nowhere; Peter Lee Johnson; Wheezy; the Legendary Traxster	3:18
2.	"Time Moving Slow"	Ye; Griffin; Aswad Asif; Charity Joy Brown; Nathan Butts; Adam Kain; Lindley; Joaquin Maldonado; Quentin Miller; Timothy Mosley; AJ Roth; Julian Sago; Amir Stevie B; Tyshane Thompson; Konrad Żyrek	Ye; Ty Dolla $ign; AyoAA; Cruza; Nathan Butts; Shdøw; Timbaland; the Legendary Traxster	2:39
3.	"Field Trip"	Ye; Griffin; Jordan Carter; Dylan Cleary-Krell; Christopher Dotson; Glass; Edin Jakupovic; Bill Kapri; Lindley; Gabe Shaddow; Caleb Toliver	Ye; Ty Dolla $ign; Chrishan; Shaddow; Dez Wright; EJPXris; Wheezy; the Legendary Traxster	2:43
4.	"Fried"	Ye; Griffin; Oscar Adler; Terrance Michael Boykin; Grant Dickinson; Dimitri Leslie Roger; Malik Yusef	Ye; Ty Dolla $ign; Oscar Adler; Outtatown; TheLabCook	2:46
5.	"Isabella"	Ye; Griffin; John M.F. Anderson; Isabella Papile	Ye; Ty Dolla $ign; John M.F. Anderson	0:09
6.	"Promotion"	Ye; Griffin; NayVadius DeMun Cash; Ant Clemons; Dotson; London Holmes; Lindley; William Moore; Supreme Williams	Ye; Ty Dolla $ign; Chrishan; London on da Track; the Legendary Traxster	2:39
7.	"530"	Ye; Griffin; John Cunningham; Isaac De Boni; Jahmal Gwin; Evan Mast; Michael Mulé; Shaddow	Ye; Ty Dolla $ign; BoogzDaBeast; E.VAX; FnZ; Shaddow; Cunningham	4:48
8.	"Dead"	Ye; Griffin; Durk Devontay Banks; Jacob Canady; Cash; Holmes; Tiwan Raybon; Williams	Ye; Ty Dolla $ign; ATL Jacob; London on da Track	4:23
9.	"Forever Rolling"	Ye; Griffin; Aaron Butler; Clemons; Morning Estrada; Henning Grüschow; Dominique Jones; Jeffrey Lynn Jones Jr.; Kejuan Muchita; Thomas	Ye; Ty Dolla $ign; Audiovista; Foreverolling; FlexOnTheBeat; Havoc; Leon Thomas; Morning Estrada	3:15
10.	"Bomb"	Ye; Griffin; Brown; Elijah Cordano; Kain; Lindley; Noah Madrid; Roth; Sago; Chicago West; North West	Ye; Ty Dolla $ign; Cruza; Noah Madrid; Tech Club; the Legendary Traxster	2:31
11.	"River"	Ye; Griffin; Asif; Taylor Dexter; Jordan Jenks; Lindley; Miller; Caleb Selby; Wesley Singerman; Jeffery Williams	Ye; Ty Dolla $ign; AyoAA; Gren808; Pi'erre Bourne; Taydex; Wes Singerman; the Legendary Traxster	3:35
12.	"Forever"	Ye; Griffin; Dotson; Miller; Shaddow	Ye; Ty Dolla $ign; Chrishan; Gabe Shaddow	2:15
13.	"Husband"	Ye; Griffin; Cleary-Krell; Marc Jenkins Jr.; Brittani Saeun; Yusef	Ye; Dez Wright	2:17
14.	"Lifestyle"	Ye; Griffin; Andrew Lövgren; Nico Baran; Dwayne Carter; Cleary-Krell; De Boni; Glass; Mulé; Andrew Neely; Shaddow	Ye; Ty Dolla $ign; Deaton Chris Anthony; Dez Wright; FnZ; Shaddow; Wheezy	3:23
15.	"Sky City"	Ye; Griffin; Danielle Balbuena; Charles Bereal; Clemons; Jahmal Gwin; Mosley; Terius Youngdell Nash; James Royo; Sidney Royel Selby III; Shaddow; Michael Suski; Jose Angel Velasquez; Federico Vindver; Cydel Young	Ye; Ty Dolla $ign; Angel Lopez; BoogzDaBeast; CharlieBeReal; DrtWrk; Federico Vindver; Shaddow; Timbaland; Damn James!	4:22
16.	"My Soul"	Ye; Griffin; Israel Boyd; Aaron Butts; Mark Byrd; Darhyl Camper; Edward Davadi; De Boni; Gabreal Griffin; Gwin; Stephen Blake Kanicka; Mulé; Charles Misodi Njapa; Rory Noble; Young	Ye; Ty Dolla $ign; 88-Keys; BoogzDaBeast; Camper; Edsclusive; FnZ; Mark Byrd; Rory Noble; Stephen Blake Kanicka	3:57
Total length:				49:48

Vultures 2 digital deluxe track listing 1
No.	Title	Length
17.	"Take Off Your Dress"

Vultures 2 digital deluxe track listing 2 (Note: Please see Billboard for track listings 2–4.)
No.	Title	Length
17.	"Believer"

Vultures 2 digital deluxe track listing 3
No.	Title	Length
17.	"Drunk"

Vultures 2 digital deluxe track listing 4
No.	Title	Length
17.	"Gun to My Head"

Vultures 2 digital deluxe track listing 5
No.	Title	Length
17.	"Can U Be"

Notes

- "Time Moving Slow" features additional vocals from the Curva Nord Milano ultras.
- "Field Trip" features vocals from Playboi Carti, Don Toliver, and Kodak Black.
- "Fried" features additional vocals from the Curva Nord Milano ultras.
- "Promotion" features vocals from Future.
- "Dead" features vocals from Future and Lil Durk.
- "Forever Rolling" features vocals from Lil Baby.
- "Bomb" features vocals from West's daughters, North and Chicago, as well as Yuno Miles.
- "River" features vocals from Young Thug and additional vocals from Charlie Wilson.
- "Lifestyle" features vocals from Lil Wayne.
- "Sky City" features vocals from 070 Shake, Desiigner, and CyHi; and additional vocals from The-Dream and Slim.
- "My Soul" features vocals from Ty Dolla Sign's brother, Big TC, and additional vocals from Todd Rundgren and the Sunday Service Choir.
- "Drunk" features vocals from Peso Pluma and Kodak Black.
- "Gun to My Head" features vocals from Kid Cudi.
- "Can U Be" features vocals from Travis Scott and uses a part of the movie Silver Linings Playbook as an introduction.

Sample credits

- "Field Trip" contains samples of "Machine Gun", as performed by Portishead.
- "Isabella" contains samples of "Shoes", as performed by Isabella Papile.
- "530" contains samples of "Break the Fall (Acoustic)", as performed by Swsh.
- "River" contains samples of "River", as performed by Leon Bridges.
- "Forever" contains samples of "Maybe" as performed by Kettenkarussell.
- "Sky City" contains an interpolation of "O-o-h Child", as performed by the Five Stairsteps.
- "Take Off Your Dress" contains samples of "Please Make It Good Again", as performed by Talmadge Armstrong.
- "Gun to My Head" contains samples of "Blindside", as performed by Alice Merton.
- "Can U Be" contains samples of "Stop, Look, Listen (To Your Heart)", as performed by Marvin Gaye and Diana Ross.

== Charts ==
=== Weekly charts ===
Weekly chart performance for Vultures 2
Chart (2024)	Peak position
Australian Albums (ARIA)	4
Australian Hip Hop/R&B Albums (ARIA)	1
Austrian Albums (Ö3 Austria)	7
Belgian Albums (Ultratop Flanders)	7
Belgian Albums (Ultratop Wallonia)	17
Canadian Albums (Billboard)	1
Czech Albums (ČNS IFPI)	8
Danish Albums (Hitlisten)	4
Dutch Albums (Album Top 100)	6
Finnish Albums (Suomen virallinen lista)	19
French Albums (SNEP)	16
German Albums (Offizielle Top 100)	8
German Albums (Top 20 Hip Hop)	2
Hungarian Albums (MAHASZ)	11
Icelandic Albums (Tónlistinn)	3
Irish Albums (Official Charts)	6
Irish Independent Albums (IRMA)	1
Italian Albums (FIMI)	12
Japanese Digital Albums (Oricon)	31
Lithuanian Albums (AGATA)	5
New Zealand Albums (RMNZ)	3
Norwegian Albums (VG-lista)	2
Polish Albums (ZPAV)	4
Portuguese Albums (AFP)	7
Slovak Albums (ČNS IFPI)	15
Spanish Albums (Promusicae)	16
Swedish Albums (Sverigetopplistan)	9
Swiss Albums (Schweizer Hitparade)	2
Swiss Hip-Hop Albums (Schweizer Hitparade)	2
UK Albums (Official Charts)	7
UK Independent Albums (Official Charts)	10
UK R&B Albums (Official Charts)	1
US Billboard 200	2
US Independent Albums (Billboard)	1
US Top R&B/Hip-Hop Albums (Billboard)	1

=== Year-end charts ===
Year-end chart performance for Vultures 2
Chart (2024)	Position
US Top R&B/Hip-Hop Albums (Billboard)	76
