= Fried (song) =

2024 song by Kanye West and Ty Dolla Sign

Song by ¥$

from the album Vultures 2
- Released: August 3, 2024
- Genre: Trap
- Length: 2:46
- Label: YZY
- Songwriters: Kanye West; Tyrone Griffin, Jr.; Terrance Michael Boykin; Christopher Dotson; Grant Dickinson; Malik Yusef; Oscar Adler; Dimitri Leslie Roger; Mark Williams
- Producers: Kanye West; Ty Dolla Sign; Chrishan; Outtatown; TheLabCook; Oscar Adler

"Fried" (stylized in all caps) is a trap song by the American hip-hop superduo ¥$, composed of rapper Kanye West and singer Ty Dolla Sign, from their second collaborative album, Vultures 2 (2024), released through YZY. The song features additional vocals from the Curva Nord Milano ultras. West and Ty Dolla Sign served as producers with Chrishan, Outtatown, TheLabCook, and Oscar Adler. With the exception of Outtatown, the producers wrote the song alongside Bump J, Malik Yusef, Mark Williams of Ojivolta, and Rich the Kid.

Upon its release, the song received mixed reviews from music critics. Commercially, the track peaked at number 87 on the US Billboard Hot 100 and within the top 10 of the New Zealand Hot Singles chart. It also charted at number 151 on the Global 200, and made charts in Canada and the United Kingdom. An accompanying animated music video, directed by West and Austin Taylor, was released on August 8, 2024, depicting masked individuals running through an eerie concrete setting continuously.

== Background ==
On February 10, 2024, Kanye West and Ty Dolla Sign released Vultures 1, their debut album as ¥$ and the first in their Vultures series. The duo had previously collaborated on multiple tracks, including the singles "Only One" (2014) and "Ego Death" (2020). Their most recent collaboration, up until Vultures 1, was "Junya pt 2", from West's 2021 studio album Donda. Rich the Kid, who contributed writing to "Fried", had previously contributed vocals to the Vultures 1 single "Carnival", which peaked at number one on the US Billboard Hot 100. Producer TheLabCook was also heavily involved in both tracks. The Curva Nord Milano ultras are prominently featured on the track, having also been featured on multiple Vultures series songs, "Carnival" included.

== Composition and lyrics ==
"Fried" is a high-energy track, featuring trap production and stadium chants. Many critics have noted its similarities to "Carnival", due to its production and usage of the Milano ultras. The song was written by West and Ty Dolla Sign themselves, alongside Bump J, TheLabCook, Malik Yusef, Oscar Adler, and Rich the Kid. West and Ty Dolla Sign also produced the song alongside TheLabCook, Adler, and Outtatown. The song underwent multiple minor changes in the days following the release of Vultures 2, including a short-lived addition of new ad-libs by Ty Dolla Sign. In September 2024, West called "Fried" his favorite song he's released.

== Critical reception ==
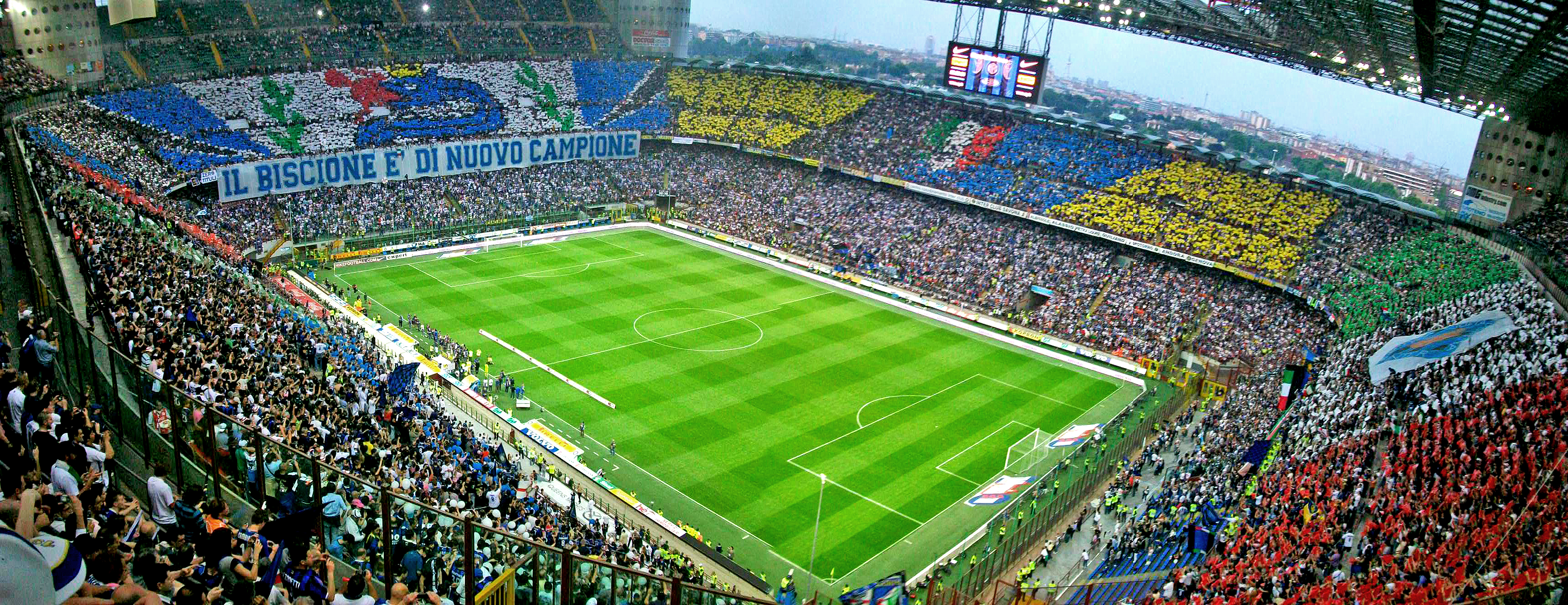
Though some reviewers complimented the song's production and delivery, many saw its usage of the Curva Nord Milano ultras as an attempt to copy the success of "Carnival".

"Fried" received mixed reviews from music critics. In a positive review of the song, Michael Saponara of Billboard placed the song 6th on his list of the best Vultures 2 songs, stating it gave the album "positive change of pace ... to send the energy levels through the roof." He complimented the appearance of the Curva Nord Milano ultras, who were a "perfect fit" and helped give the song a "sinister texture", predicting the song will become a fan-favorite at listening events. Ben Beaumont-Thomas of The Guardian had mixed thoughts on the song, finding its lyrics to be a mixture of "witless porn-addled bars ... alongside some satisfyingly weighted ones". He complimented West and Ty Dolla Sign's performance as "convincingly unhinged when delivering the song’s climactic lines, sealing the kind of blown-out rager that West helped inspire with 2013's Yeezus".

Others critics were more negative. In his review of Vultures 2, Gabriel Bras Nevares of HotNewHipHop called the track "an embarrassing attempt to copy the appeal behind 'Carnival' with even worse lyrics". Slant Magazine's Paul Attard saw the song as a "desperate attempt" to recreate the success of "Carnival", and viewed it as emblematic of greater issues with Vultures 2, writing that it "serves as the working thesis for this blunder: all bluster, zero modesty." Pitchfork's Stephen Kearse also noted similarities between the two tracks, believing that American rapper Playboi Carti's appearance on the Vultures 2 track "Field Trip" was also an attempt to capitalize on the success of "Carnival".

== Commercial performance ==
In the United States, the song charted at number 87 on the Billboard Hot 100 and peaked at number 24 on the Hot R&B/Hip-Hop Songs chart. In Canada, the song charted at number 80 on the Canadian Hot 100. In New Zealand, the song charted at number 8 on the New Zealand Hot Singles chart, its highest peak on any chart it made. In the United Kingdom, the song charted at number 43 on the UK Independent Singles Chart. The song also charted at number 151 on the Global 200.

== Music video ==
A still from the music video for "Fried", showing a group of people running across a series of hallways.

On August 8, 2024, West posted the music video for "Fried" to his YouTube and Instagram accounts., marking the first visual from Vultures 2. It was directed by West and Austin Taylor, while the animation was done by London-based animator and creative director Carlos Rico. He, along with Arseni Novo and Velvet Control, created the video's 3D models. The final video was edited and produced by Medet. A short behind-the-scenes clip, showcasing the making of the music video, was shared on Rico's Instagram account on August 9, 2024.

The music video for "Fried" is minimalist, and runs for two-and-a-half minutes. The video shows a large group of masked individuals wearing black hoodies and pants running through an eerie concrete setting, consisting of geometric structures and walls. They seem to run across hallways continuously, which infinitely stretch outwards. The music video led to mixed reactions from fans; some felt it worked well as a visualizer, while others were confused as to how it connected to the song.

== Charts ==
Chart performance for "Fried"
Chart (2024)	Peak position
Canada Hot 100 (Billboard)	80
Global 200 (Billboard)	151
New Zealand Hot Singles (RMNZ)	8
UK Indie (Official Charts)	43
US Billboard Hot 100	87
US Hot R&B/Hip-Hop Songs (Billboard)	24
