= Promotion (song) =

2024 song by Kanye West and Ty Dolla Sign

Song by ¥$ and Future

from the album Vultures 2
- Released: August 3, 2024
- Genre: Trap
- Length: 2:38
- Label: YZY
- Songwriters: Ye; Tyrone Griffin, Jr.; Nayvadius Wilburn; Anthony Clemons, Jr.; Samuel Lindley; William Seay Moore
- Producers: Ye; Ty Dolla Sign; The Legendary Traxster

"Promotion" (stylized in all caps) is a song by American hip hop superduo ¥$, composed of rapper Kanye West and singer Ty Dolla Sign, and American rapper Future. The song was released through West's YZY record label as the sixth track from the superduo's second collaborative album, Vultures 2, on August 3, 2024. West and Ty Dolla Sign produced the track with the Legendary Traxster, who wrote it alongside Ant Clemons, DJ Esco, and Future. Prior to the song's release, streamer Adin Ross previewed a snippet in July 2024.

"Promotion" peaked at number 76 on the Billboard Hot 100, and is Future's 200th entry on the chart. Critical responses to the song were generally unfavorable.

== Background and composition ==
On March 13, 2024, fans found that "Promotion" was available to stream via Instagram and TikTok alongside other tracks from Vultures 2. On July 23, 2024, American influencer Adin Ross shared a snippet of "Promotion", revealing rapper Future's appearance. At a concert in August, Ty Dolla Sign mistakenly said that Vultures 2 topped the US Billboard 200 prior to a performance of the song.

"Promotion" includes synthesizer tones and drum machine sounds. Future sings an Auto-Tuned chorus. During the song's outro, West references his hit single "Good Life" (2007), rapping "Like we always do at this..."

== Release and reception ==
On August 3, 2024, ¥$ released their second studio album Vultures 2 independently through YZY, including "Promotion" as its sixth track. The song was met with generally negative reviews from music critics, who often criticized its production and lyrics. Writing for Slant Magazine, Paul Attard felt that West is not bothered with the song and called it "too-cutesy." Gabriel Bras Nevares of HotNewHipHop was highly critical of the production, seeing the synth tones and drums as among the most generic work of 2024. Complex's Peter A. Berry criticized Future's chorus, writing that it "sounds like an indistinct beginning of a Future verse." He was also unfavorable towards West's verses, comparing their lyrics to "reading off cliff notes about how to be a jerk rather than convincingly playing the role of one." In a positive review at Billboard, Michael Saponara wrote that the song features West's strongest performance on the album as he utilizes his "Midas touch", also praising Future's appearance.

== Credits and personnel ==
Credits adapted from Spotify and Tidal.

- Ty Dolla Sign — producer, songwriter, recording engineer
- Kanye West — producer, songwriter
- Future — songwriter
- The Legendary Traxster — producer, songwriter
- Ant Clemons — songwriter
- DJ Esco — songwriter
- Rafael "Fai" Bautista — mixing engineer, mastering engineer, recording engineer
- Stef Moro — recording engineer
- Eric Manco — mixing engineer, mastering engineer
- Morning Estrada — recording engineer
- Oscar Cornejo — mixing engineer, mastering engineer

== Charts ==
Chart performance for "Promotion"
Chart (2024)	Peak position
Canada Hot 100 (Billboard)	80
Global 200 (Billboard)	138
New Zealand Hot Singles (RMNZ)	5
UK Singles (Official Charts)	94
UK Indie (Official Charts)	34
US Billboard Hot 100	76
US Hot R&B/Hip-Hop Songs (Billboard)	21
