= River (¥$ and Young Thug song) =

2024 song by Kanye West and Ty Dolla Sign

Song by ¥$ and Young Thug

from the album Vultures 2
- Released: August 3, 2024
- Genre: Trap
- Length: 3:35
- Label: YZY
- Songwriters: Ye; Tyrone Griffin, Jr.; Jeffery Williams; Jordan Jenks; Samuel Lindley; Aswad Asif
- Producers: Ye; Ty Dolla Sign; Pi'erre Bourne; Wes Singerman; Taydex; the Legendary Traxster; AyoAA

"River" (stylized in all caps) is a song by the American hip-hop superduo ¥$, composed of rapper Kanye West and singer Ty Dolla Sign, and American rapper Young Thug. It was released through West's YZY brand as the eleventh track from the superduo's second collaborative album, Vultures 2, on August 3, 2024. The song features additional vocals from American singer Charlie Wilson. The song was produced by West and Ty Dolla Sign alongside Pi'erre Bourne, Wes Singerman, Taydex, AyoAA, the Legendary Traxster, and Lamm.

== Background ==
According to AyoAA, whose production is featured on the updated streaming version of the song, "River" started out as a collaboration between West and Young Thug, where Young Thug's verse was taken from a separate unreleased song. The song originally did not feature Ty Dolla Sign.

After it was officially debuted at the Vultures Rave event in Miami, a representative for American singer Leon Bridges called its sampling of Bridge's work "a surprise", as Bridges has never recorded with West, "nor has he ever been in the studio with him." Though they were both unaware that West had sampled the song, they did not seem to object to it.

In January 2024, West's daughter North would be spotted wearing a t-shirt that contained an early track listing for Vultures 1, with "River" included as its fifteenth track and Bridges being credited as a feature. In March, the song would appear as a sound on Instagram and TikTok alongside other Vultures 2 tracks, though this upload was likely unofficial, as the audio was allegedly ripped from existing leaks.

== Composition and lyrics ==
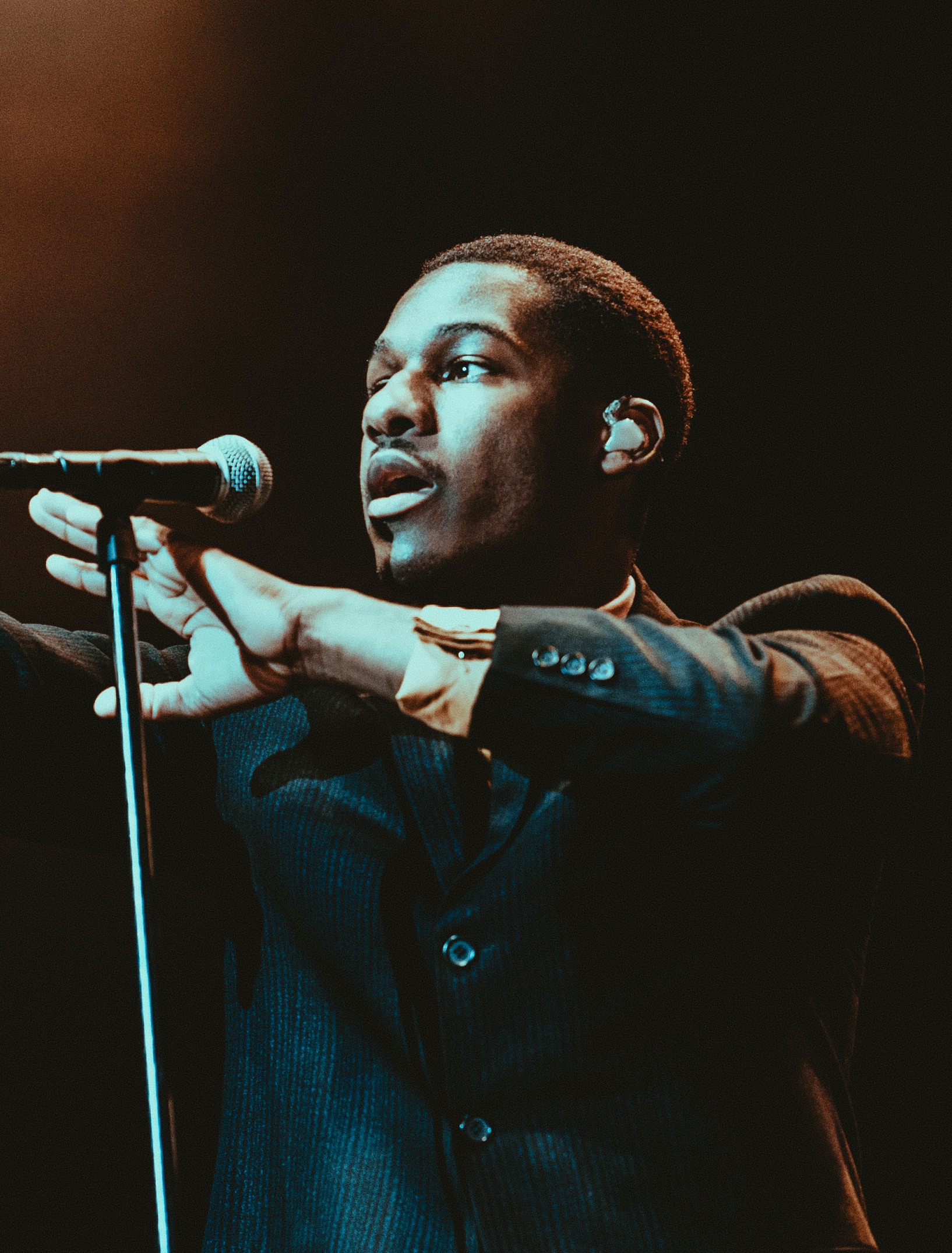
"River" samples Leon Bridge's song of the same name.

"River" makes several references to other public figures. Young Thug opens with a verse that emphasizes luxury. He raps about affording luxury goods for women, showing off expensive watches like the Audemars Piguet, and maintaining a lifestyle characterized by high-end fashion and extravagant spending.

The chorus, performed by West, pleas for freedom for incarcerated individuals. West repeatedly chants, "Too much money to be in the streets / Too much money to spend all on me / Too much hate and not enough love / Free Larry, free Young Thug." West has advocated for Larry Hoover's release from prison for over a decade. On May 9, 2022, Thug was arrested in Atlanta on gang-related charges. On West's third verse, he advocates for the release of Demetrius Flenory as well.

The outro of "River" is based around a sample of American singer Leon Bridges' track of the same name, from his 2015 album Coming Home.

== Critical reception ==
The song was met with highly positive reviews and is generally considered one of the best songs from Vultures 2, an otherwise negatively received album. Michael Saponara of Billboard ranked "River" as the seventh best song on Vultures 2. He wrote "While calling for Young Thug's freedom – as he opens 'River' with a silky verse – the inspiring track gives fans a holy bath, and looks to purify Ye and Ty's souls with help from Leon Bridges and Uncle Charlie Wilson." Mosi Reeves from Rolling Stone wrote, "[Ty Dolla Sign's] intentions don't seem as fraught — or as impactful — as Ye, or guest stars like Young Thug, the now-imprisoned ATL innovator who appears on 'River.' Given Thugger's never-ending racketeering trial, his claim that he has 'too much money to be in the streets' feels sadly ironic." Sam Moore from HipHopDX wrote, "...'River,' which heavily interpolates the Leon Bridges track of the same name, should have been a pillar that the album was built around." Gabriel Nevares from HotNewHipHop wrote, "Yet no one stands out the way that guests did on albums like Donda because of how rickety the foundations for their appearances are. One definite exception is 'River,' with progressive production and a charismatic Young Thug verse that (if only for its inclusion) speaks to Kanye's themes of freedom and justice on the track. Ye's passionate vocal performance and lyricism are a rare highlight here, and Ty Dolla Sign leads the outro with heavenly vocals." Paul Attard from Slant Magazine wrote, "'River' transforms a fairly pedestrian Leon Bridges song into a touching and triumphant plea for freedom on behalf of both Larry Hoover and Young Thug, with a sleek Thugger feature tacked onto the start for good measure."

== Credits and personnel ==
Credits adapted from Tidal.

- Ye — songwriter, producer
- Ty Dolla Sign — songwriter, producer, recording engineer
- Young Thug — songwriter
- Pi'erre Bourne — songwriter, producer
- The Legendary Traxster — songwriter, producer
- AyoAA – songwriter, producer
- Wes Singerman – producer
- Taydex — producer
- Oscar Cornejo — mixing engineer, mastering engineer
- Rafael "Fai" Bautista — mixing engineer, mastering engineer, recording engineer
- Marshall "Magic Brynt" Bryant — recording engineer
- Morning Estrada — recording engineer
- Stef Moro — recording engineer

== Charts ==
Chart performance for "River"
Chart (2024)	Peak position
US Bubbling Under Hot 100 (Billboard)	11
US Hot R&B/Hip-Hop Songs (Billboard)	32
