= Carnival (¥$ song) =

2024 single by Kanye West and Ty Dolla Sign

Single by ¥$ featuring Rich the Kid and Playboi Carti (Note: The EP pack credits Rich the Kid as a lead artist and Playboi Carti as a featured artist.)

from the album Vultures 1
- Released: February 15, 2024
- Recorded: 2023–2024
- Genre: EDM trap; punk rap
- Length: 4:24
- Label: YZY
- Songwriters: Ye; Tyrone Griffin Jr.; Dimitri Roger; Jordan Carter; Mark Williams; Grant Dickinson; Nasir Pemberton; Raul Cubina; Samuel Lindley
- Producers: Ye; Ty Dolla Sign; Digital Nas; Ojivolta; TheLabCook; The Legendary Traxster

¥$ singles chronology
"Talking / Once Again" (2024)	"Carnival" (2024)	"Slide" (2024)

Kanye West singles chronology
"Talking / Once Again" (2024)	"Carnival" (2024)	"Gimme a Second 2" (2024)

Ty Dolla Sign singles chronology
"Talking / Once Again" (2024)	"Carnival" (2024)	"Gimme a Second 2" (2024)

Rich the Kid singles chronology
"Big Pimpin" (2023)	"Carnival" (2024)	"Real One" (2024)

Playboi Carti singles chronology
"Popular" (2023)	"Carnival" (2024)	"Fe!n" (2024)

Alternate cover
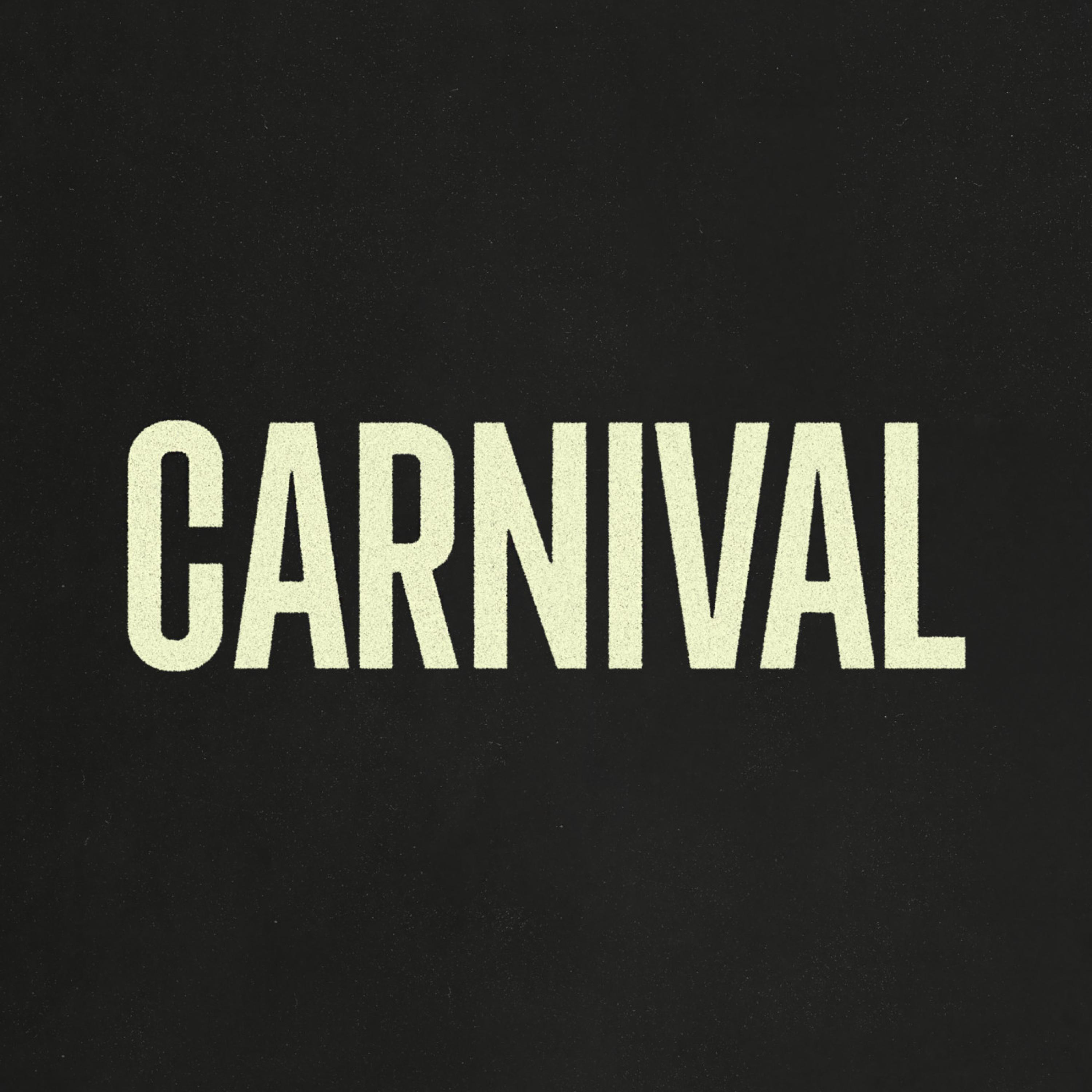
- Cover originally used on digital streaming platforms and used for the Carnival Pack compilation EP

Music video
- "Carnival" on YouTube

"Carnival" (stylized in all caps) is a song by the American hip-hop superduo ¥$, composed of rapper Kanye West and singer Ty Dolla Sign, with American rappers Rich the Kid and Playboi Carti, from the duo's debut studio album, Vultures 1 (2024). It was written by West, Ty Dolla Sign, Digital Nas, Ojivolta, TheLabCook, the Legendary Traxster, Rich the Kid, and Playboi Carti, being produced by the former six. On February 15, 2024, "Carnival" was released as the third single from Vultures 1 by YZY on an EP pack.

A hip-hop song with elements of punk rock and based on a sample of West's "Hell of a Life", "Carnival" features an EDM and trap beat. The song prominently contains a vocal loop of chants from Inter Milan's ultras, combined with a bassline and synthesizers. Lyrically, it features the artists discussing oral sex with a woman. Music critics were polarized towards the song, split between praise of the production and criticism of West's verse. Some lauded the chants and picked it as an album highlight, though numerous critics were repulsed by West comparing himself to figures who have been accused of sexual assault. West mentioning Taylor Swift in the song was criticized by her fans.

Commercially, "Carnival" peaked at number one on the US Billboard Hot 100, becoming the fifth chart-topper for West and making him the only rap act to reach the summit across three separate decades. It became the second number-one for Ty Dolla Sign on the Hot 100, and the first for both Rich the Kid and Playboi Carti. The song also topped the charts in Greece, Iceland, Latvia, Lithuania, and the United Arab Emirates. It peaked within the top-10 of 13 other territories, such as Canada and Luxembourg, as well as the Billboard Global 200.

The song received double platinum and platinum certifications in the US and New Zealand from the Recording Industry Association of America and Recorded Music NZ, respectively. An accompanying music video was released, which was a tribute to the ultras that features computer-generated imagery of them at a stadium, where male figures fight amongst each other. Critics mostly praised the video for its violent style of imagery.

== Background ==
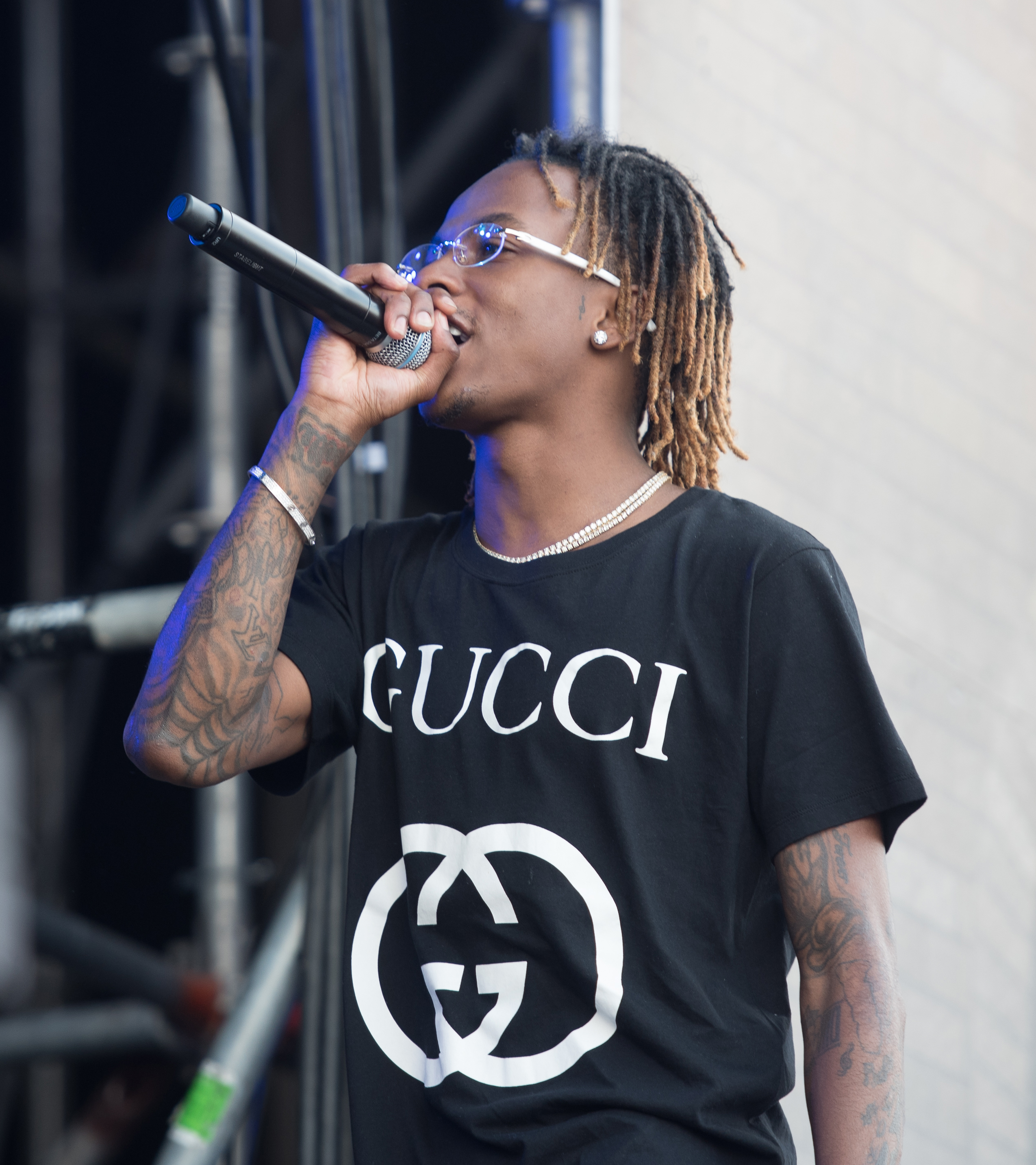
Rich the Kid freestyled his contributions to the song during studio sessions in Saudi Arabia, completing his recording in between 15 and 20 minutes.

Kanye West served as an executive producer on Playboi Carti's second album, Whole Lotta Red, released on Christmas day in 2020. Playboi Carti subsequently discussed their collaboration to fellow rapper Kid Cudi, hailing West's history and that he "opened my eyes to some shit". The former explained working together brought realization of his heavy appreciation for West, feeling this for how he introduced him to his team too that largely understood what he was saying. Playboi Carti later appeared on West's single "Off the Grid" for his 2021 album Donda, while he also contributed to the demo album Donda 2. West and Ty Dolla Sign featured him on the Vultures 1 tracks "Carnival" and "Fuk Sumn", with the former also including an appearance from Rich the Kid.

In April 2024, Rich the Kid described working with Playboi Carti as having come "full-circle" from recording videos in his grandmother's apartment years ago. Rich the Kid said the two spend time across Los Angeles together "doing all types of crazy shit", feeling they made history with the collaboration. He still wanted to work with West due to enjoying his music despite his controversies in the media and after the song's success, him and Ty Dolla Sign were dedicated to production of Rich the Kid's fourth album Life's a Gamble.

== Recording ==
"Carnival" was first conceived in studio sessions for Vultures in Saudi Arabia during 2023, where Rich the Kid flew in from Dubai after Ty Dolla Sign mentioned the sessions to him. Rich the Kid had to get a taxi from the airport in Saudi Arabia and he listened to the album on arrival, then started recording on his second day. He envisioned the song as "new-age rage rock star" material upon his first listen and recorded his chorus then the verse, completing this in 15 to 20 minutes at the most. Rich the Kid did not write down any of his lyrics and instead freestyled in the studio, questioning those who said he was lucky by saying it is not "like the words didn't come out of my mouth". He listened back after taking his headphones off and Ty Dolla Sign recorded next for the song, then the singer and West contacted him after their Las Vegas listening event to ask what contribution from him should be included on Vultures 1. Initially a beat produced solely by TheLabCook, the track was titled "Honor Roll" at the time and Rich the Kid warranted its inclusion due to the elevated level of energy. According to Rich the Kid, "Carnival" would likely not have included on the album if not for him.

The track was produced by West and Ty Dolla Sign with Digital Nas, Ojivolta, TheLabCook, and the Legendary Traxster. The producers co-wrote it with Rich the Kid and Playboi Carti. West added much of the production to the track and selected the chants, with Rich the Kid having picked the beat. Ty Dolla Sign said that he initially hesitated to play the track for West because he was against any hi-hats on the album, although the rapper appreciated it upon his first listen in Las Vegas and then recorded his verse, as well as altering the melody. Italian football club Inter Milan's ultras named "Curva Nord" recorded their background vocals in the studio, which were used as chants. Shortly before the release of Vultures 1, Ty Dolla Sign FaceTimed Rich the Kid and played Playboi Carti's verse, sending him the final version across. On March 18, 2024, a video surfaced online of West recording his verse for the song in a room as he was surrounded by dozens of friends. West had headphones across his head as he nodded along to the blaring music and his friends talked amongst themselves, until they went silent when he rapped the verse.

== Composition and lyrics ==
"Carnival"
West's verse from the song reflects the chaotic state of fame, media, and his public perception, ironically comparing himself to R. Kelly, Bill Cosby, and Sean Combs.

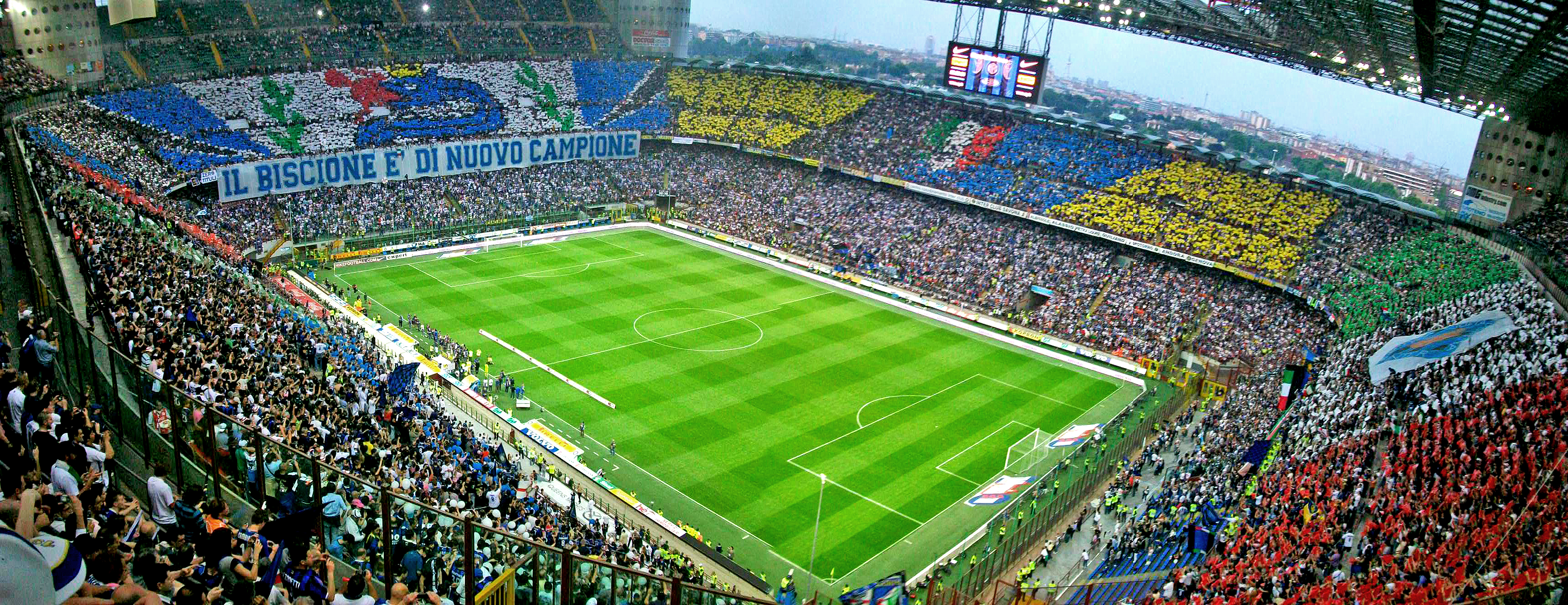
West recruited ultras from Inter Milan (pictured) to provide the backing vocals on "Carnival", incorporating a vocal loop of their chanting and intones of "ooohhh".

Musically, "Carnival" is a sparse hip-hop song, with elements of punk rock. It features an EDM and trap beat. The song incorporates a vocal loop of chanting from Inter Milan's ultras on the hook that is accompanied by intones of "ooohhh" and clapping percussion throughout, which drew comparisons to the melody of "Mo Bamba" (2017) by Sheck Wes. "Carnival" opens with the chants, combined with sounds of distortion. Sonically, the song was noted for its energy by both HotNewHipHop's Aron A. and Vibe's Marc Griffin. The song is based on a sample of "Hell of a Life", which in turn samples Ozzy Osbourne's "Iron Man". Billboard's Michael Saponara wrote that the substitute sample helps "bring the grunginess" to "Carnival". The song includes a heavy bassline and grinding synthesizers, while it invokes the style of mosh pits. West utilizes a gasping tone and in between the verses of the performers, a heavy guitar is featured.

In the lyrics of "Carnival", West, Ty Dolla Sign, Rich the Kid, and Playboi Carti discuss their experiences of oral sex with a woman. On its hook, the ultras shout "head so good, she a honor roll". West trolls cancel culture as he compares himself to R. Kelly, Bill Cosby, and Puff Daddy on the song, all of whom have faced sexual assault controversies. He raps the line "I mean since Taylor Swift" and when he had a Rollie on his wrist, alluding to his interruption of the singer at the 2009 MTV Video Music Awards that started their publicized feud. West also compares himself to Jesus and declares he turns water to Cristal, following this line with his support for Chris Brown after "what they did" to the singer. West asserted the mention is because Brown is one of the great artists who have struggled to break through due to the machinations of "middle men" in a 2024 interview, expressing that he deserves success and "is a god". He ends his verse abruptly by rapping that his children are "in a fake school", subsequently referencing this in a post telling his ex-wife Kim Kardashian to take them out of the Sierra Canyon School. West had attempted to open his own Donda Academy school, although this was closed down due to his antisemitic controversies in October 2022. While the final version of "Carnival" ends Ye's verse on "we ain't", the uncut line that can be heard on demos of track states "got my kids in a fake school, we ain't Jewish". During Playboi Carti's verse, he pays tribute to fellow rapper SahBabii.

== Release and promotion ==
On February 10, 2024, ¥$ released their debut studio album, Vultures 1, independently through YZY, including "Carnival" as the 12th track. The song was played after West and Ty Dolla Sign had left the stage during their listening event for the record at Milan's Mediolanum Forum on February 22, 2024. According to Rich the Kid, the crowd chanted along with the song and continued to do so after the event had finished, achieving its intentions of sounding "crazy in the fucking arena". On March 10, 2024, West and Ty Dolla Sign hosted a Vultures listening party at Footprint Center in Phoenix, Arizona, which was closed with an audience sing-along to the song after they performed it earlier at the event.

The song was released to Apple and YouTube Music as the third single from Vultures 1 by YZY on February 15, 2024, after this release faced issues due to the album being removed from the former platform. The single release was an EP pack that features explicit and clean versions of "Carnival", with the former lasting for four minutes and twenty-four seconds (4:24). The release also features the Hooligans version, the instrumental, and the a capella. On February 17, 2024, West revealed the song's cover art that shows a close-up photo of a screaming skinhead, who is stained with blood. The artwork was designed by Canadian artist Jon Rafman, who previously created the music video for Havoc's version of West's 2023 single "Vultures". After the track reached number one on the US Billboard Hot 100, Rich the Kid said that he and West achieving this as independent artists was "crazy, because people was asking me why I'm going so hard".

=== Ozzy Osbourne dispute ===
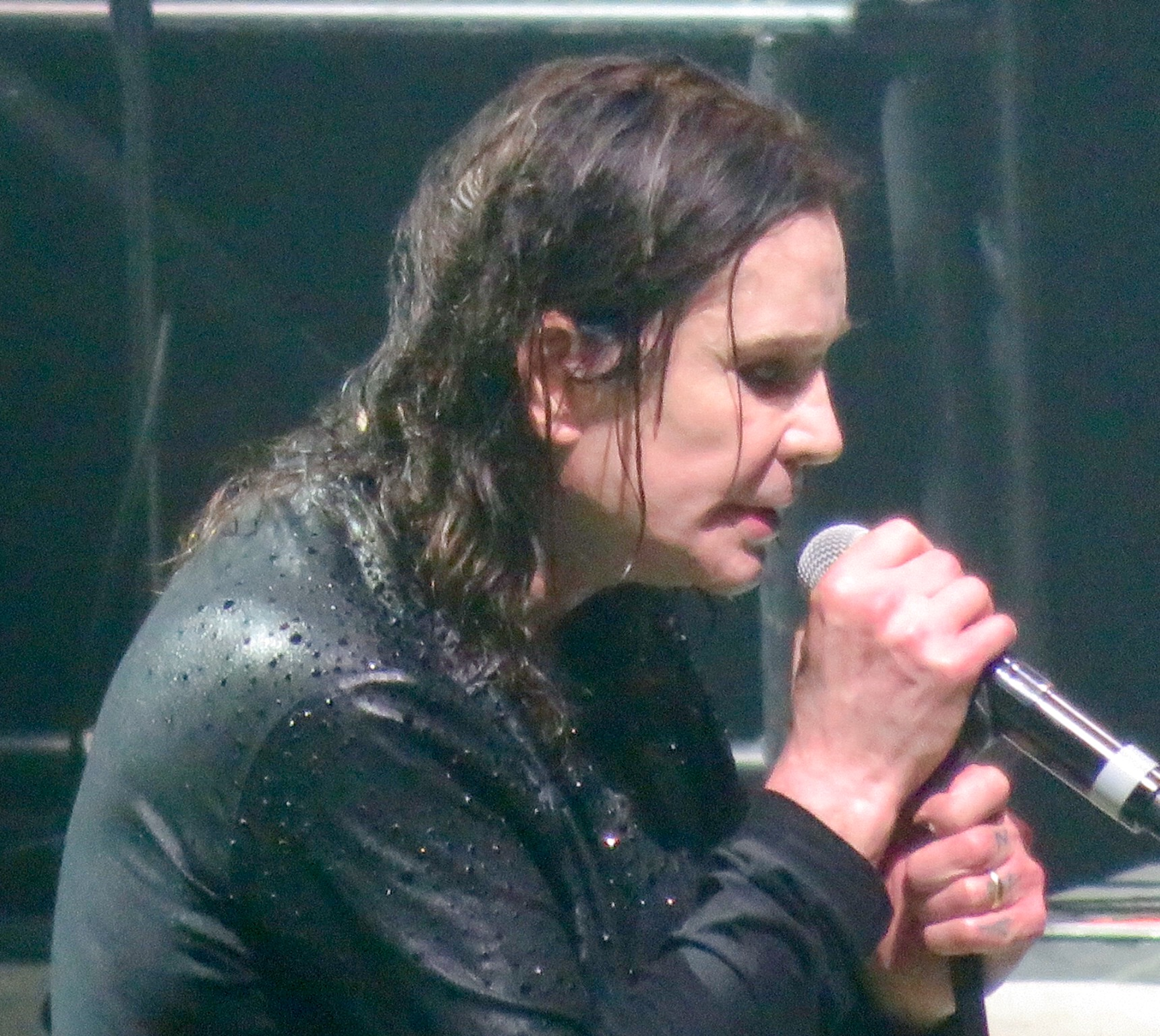
The original version of "Carnival" sampled a live performance of "Iron Man" by Black Sabbath, whose lead singer Ozzy Osbourne responded by dissociating himself from West and saying he had refused permission.

"Carnival" was previewed during West and Ty Dolla Sign's Vultures listening party at the United Center in Chicago on February 8, 2024. This version of the song used a sample of a live performance at the 1983 US Festival of "Iron Man" by English rock band Black Sabbath. The band's lead singer, Ozzy Osbourne, responded that the unauthorized sample went against his will. Osbourne posted to social media that West asked for permission to sample part of the performance from the US Festival without vocals, yet he "was refused permission because he is an antisemite and has caused untold heartache to many". He said in response to West still using the sample at the listening event, "I want no association with this man!" Despite Ozzy posting he did not want to be associated with West, him and his wife Sharon Osbourne had dressed up as the rapper and his partner Bianca Censori for Halloween 2023. Sharon told TMZ that West had "fucked with the wrong Jew", characterizing him as a "disrespectful anti-Semite". She also accused West of representing hate and the Osbournes sent a cease and desist to him. Sharon said in a statement that the Osbournes were "considering legal action" and although Ozzy had not spoken with West, their team had contacted his team. On February 10, 2024, West and Ty Dolla Sign started their Vultures listening event at the UBS Arena in New York with the song. Playboi Carti and Rich the Kid joined them, while West's track "Hell of a Life" from his 2010 album My Beautiful Dark Twisted Fantasy was sampled in place of "Iron Man". This effectively maintained the presence of "Iron Man", as "Hell of a Life" uses a cleared sample of the song. On July 30, 2024, an alternate version of "Carnival" leaked online with lyrics from West admitting to a porn addiction.

=== Other usage ===
In March 2024, "Carnival" became popular on TikTok. The track was used in various ways across the platform that revolved around its refrain, including soundtracking sports videos, gaming content, a dance trend, and lip syncing that was mainly done in front of a mirror for the "Carnival Mirror Trend". The song's chants are invoked in the track "Fried", released on ¥$'s second studio album, Vultures 2, in August 2024.

== Reception ==
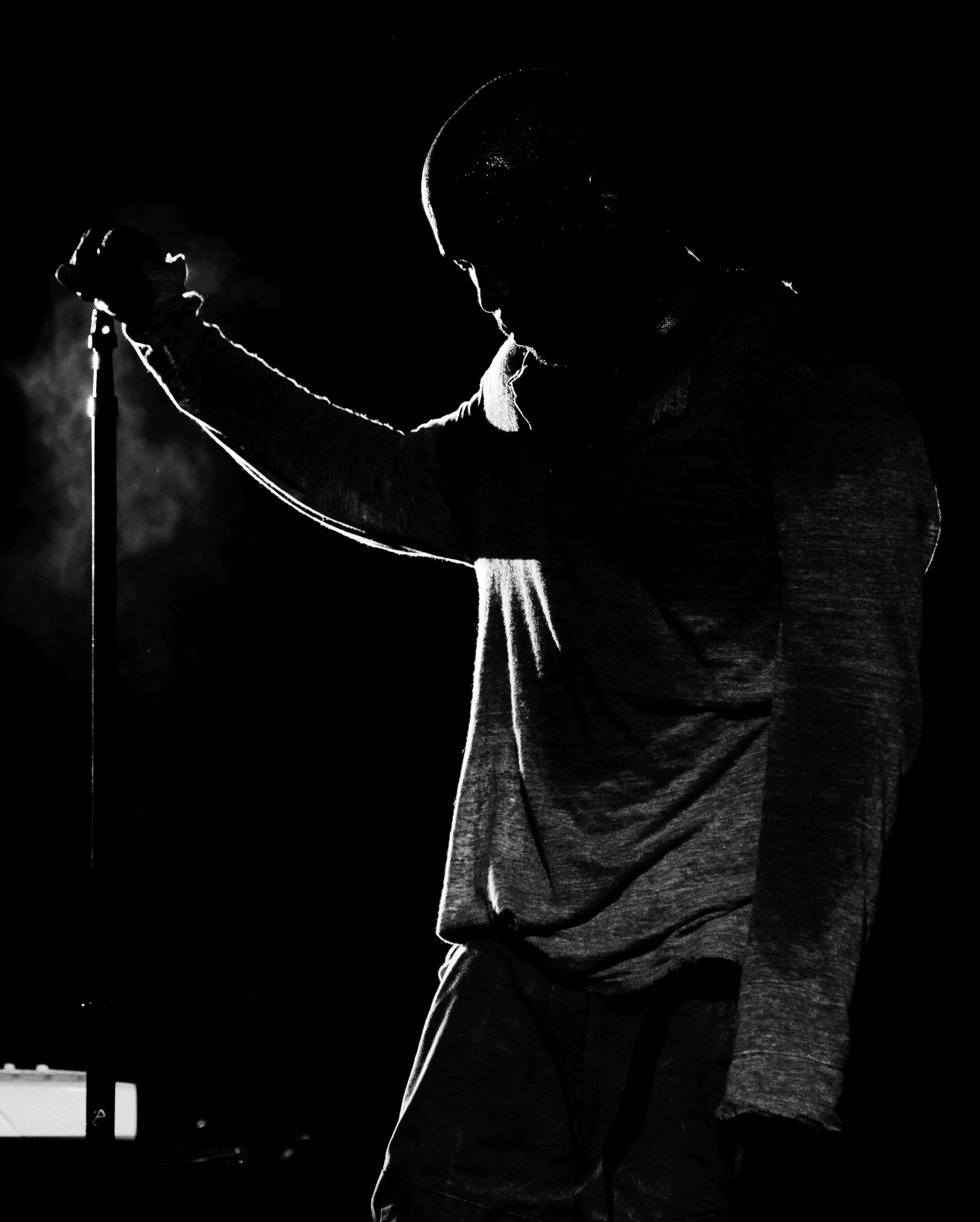
Despite criticism of West's verse, a few reviewers praised his artistry and strive to make a hit with the song.

"Carnival" was met with polarized reviews from music critics, a number of whom highlighted the production. Writing for Billboard, Saponara asserted that "Carnival" is the best song on Vultures 1 and amplifies why West's fans tolerate his controversies, album delays, "and madness ... because nobody in rap creates generational moments like this". Saponara commended West and Ty Dolla Sign's performances, while feeling the rapper manages to bring out the best of Rich the Kid and Playboi Carti as he "flips the bird to Ozzy" with the sample of "Hell of a Life". In Rolling Stone, Jayson Buford believed the song manages to invoke West's previous albums Yeezus (2013) and The Life of Pablo (2016), praising the "cutting-edge vocal mutations" that are only possible because of how he contributed to rap in spite of his controversies. Similarly, The Guardian journalist Alexis Petridis felt it channels West's desire to make a "big, undeniable hit" like he used to release regularly and he praised the hook that leads to a "thrillingly epic style", supported by the sample from a period when his "genius far outshone his ability to provoke outrage". Eric Skelton of Complex wrote that the album noticeably shows West is trying to produce a hit as he aims for a work that is able to be "chanted by tens of thousands of people in a soccer stadium", citing the song as a key example and observing the additional percussion. Fred Thomas from AllMusic lauded the "spare and distortion-inclined" production, while Pitchfork's Paul A. Thompson said the beat "is titanic but wobbles just enough". At The Atlantic, Spencer Kornhaber picked the song as a standout on the album for the ultras noisily chanting and said West "riffed on his pariah status" as his gasping resembles a street preacher, observing the musical appeal of the "adrenalizing vocal loop [that] sits atop a bone-crushing bass line". He highlighted West's move as a popstar in managing to take "an edgy, subcultural sound" and execute it with successful production as the song holds "a sense of menace, a feeling of macho alienation" that unites into a mob. Kornhaber noted the song's catchiness and powerfulness as he said its "surging sound" can soundtrack lifting weights, venting about work, or planning a coup, although he expressed that the contributing artists deliver "standard-issue pop misogyny".

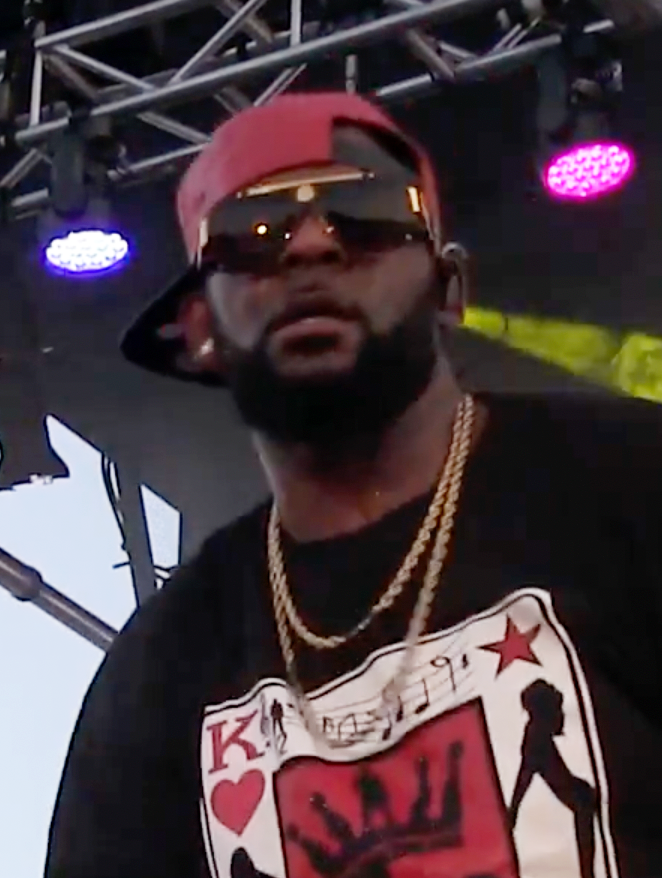
West was often criticized over his lyricism by reviewers, particularly for comparing himself to figures like R. Kelly.

In a less enthusiastic review for Sputnikmusic, Dakota West Foss noted the song making an impact from "its infectious beat of soccer hooligans" and he was pleasantly surprised with Rich the Kid and Playboi Carti's performances, yet called West lazy and lame for comparing himself to other figures, such as the "Ye Kelly" line. HotNewHipHop's Aron A. commented that West innovates by utilizing the chants in a manner "unlike anything he's delivered recently", focusing on their energy and the synthesizers as he hailed "Carnival" as the album's highlight. He named Playboi Carti's appearance one of the best on Vultures 1, although he identified West's performance as among the album's worst lyricism for his comparisons to Kelly, Cosby, and Jesus. Providing a mixed review, Rhian Daly of NME wrote off West's self-comparisons and his support for Brown, finding if the words are ignored that creativity is shown from the chants colliding "with a wall of overdriving fuzz". She thought this injects "some ominousness and urgency" into Vultures 1 despite the lack of a "killer punch", further improved by the guitar between verses. For Consequence, Wren Graves said that the song evokes the middle of West's career and this reference point "can feel a bit tired". In a negative review at XXL, Joey Ech wrote that West shows his support for Kelly and Cosby in "perhaps one of his most eyebrow-raising verses to date", noting the mentions of Puff Daddy and Jesus too. The Times reviewer Will Hodgkinson criticized the song's subject matter of oral sex in a Rolls-Royce from a woman that the performers seemingly hate, questioning if this is the best work West can produce after his controversies. Steven J. Horowitz from Variety said West "attempts to pour gasoline on the already raging fires" with the "Ye-Kelly" line that is worthy of an eye-roll, complaining that his reference to Swift proves he cannot let their incident go. Variety included the song in their Worst Songs of 2024 list, with Horowitz dubbing it "artless and, above all, tactless". Alexander Cole of HotNewHipHop wrote that the song has been described as an example of 21st century fascist art.

On October 12, 2024, West revealed that he submitted the song for the major categories of Record of the Year and Song of the Year at the 67th Annual Grammy Awards. In the ceremony's categories of his genre, it was submitted for Best Rap Song and Best Rap Performance, eventually being nominated for the former.

=== Controversy ===
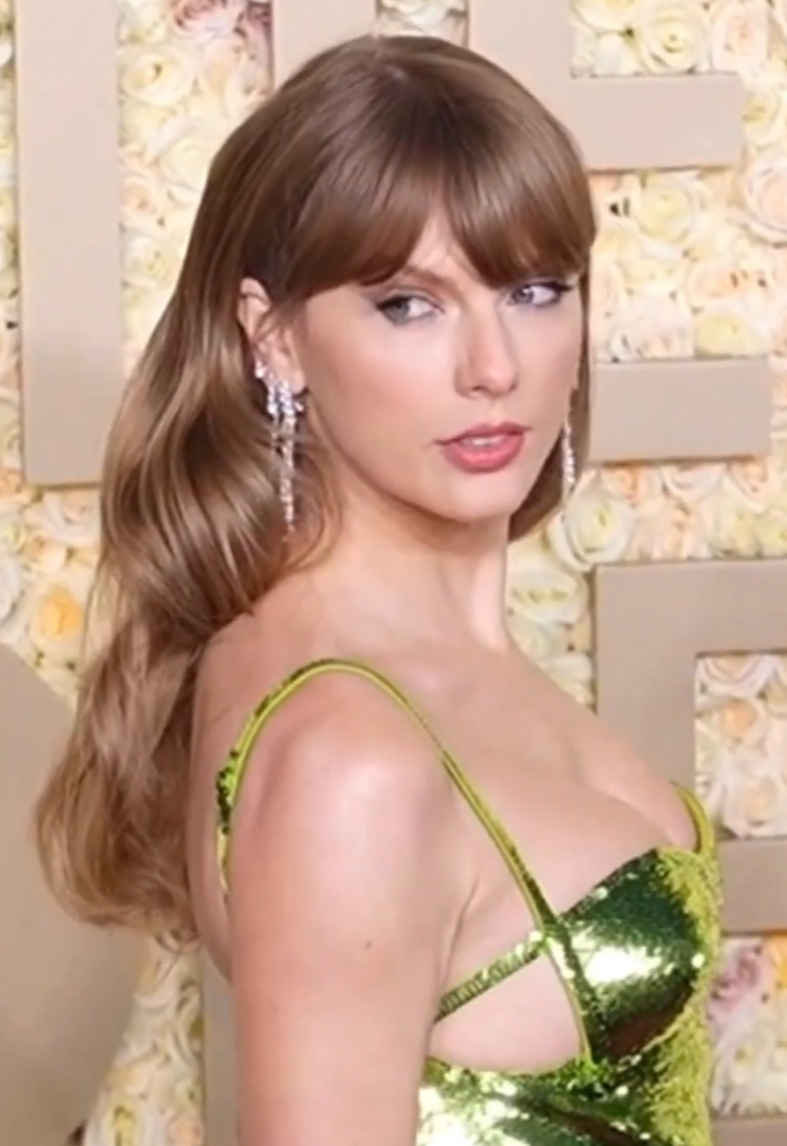
West's line "I mean since Taylor Swift" led to negative reactions from her fans, although he clarified that he is not an enemy of theirs and Swift is inspirational to him.

West was criticized for the song's reference to Swift by her fans online, who accused him of being obsessed with her. He had previously mentioned Swift in his lyrics on the 2016 single "Famous" as he rapped: "I made that bitch famous." Swift's fans organized an attempt online to prevent West from topping the Hot 100 with "Carnival", encouraging streaming of Beyoncé's "Texas Hold 'Em". West responded by posting that the song's proclamation of him being "the new Jesus, bitch" has no connection to Swift and he sided with her when Scooter Braun purchased her masters in 2019, considering the singer and Beyoncé to be inspirational. The rapper offered that he has done more help than harm to Swift's career and he is not an enemy to her fans, though quipped that he is "not [their] friend either".

== Commercial performance ==
Upon the release of Vultures 1, "Carnival" entered the US Billboard Hot 100 at number three. It fell to number four on the chart a week later, then rebounded to the second position. The song reached the top position of the Hot 100 the following week, with 33.7 million streams, 3.9 million radio airplay audience impressions, and 3,000 downloads. It became West's fifth chart-topper, Ty Dolla Sign's second, and the first for Rich the Kid and Playboi Carti. This ended West's break of 12 years and 10 months between number ones, which was the longest gap since Brenda Lee's 63 years up to 2023. This also made West the oldest rapper to reach the summit and marked his fastest time at four weeks, beating the seven-week period for his previous number-one from his feature on Katy Perry's "E.T." in 2011. West achieved a number one in the 2000s, 2010s, and 2020s, becoming one of the four artists to do this and the only rapper to top the Hot 100 across any three decades. The achievement placed West as the artist with the 10th longest span of number-ones, having gone 20 years and one month since his first with "Slow Jamz" in 2004. "Carnival" remained on the Hot 100 for 19 weeks.

The song topped the US Hot R&B/Hip-Hop Songs chart the same week it went number two on the Hot 100, experiencing an increase of 31% in streams and 258% in airplay audience from the previous week. "Carnival" marked West's ninth chart-topper and set the same timespan for number-ones that he achieved on the Hot 100, while it was Ty Dolla Sign's second number-one yet first as a lead artist, and the first for Rich the Kid and Playboi Carti. The song also topped the US Hot Rap Songs chart, becoming West's 11th number-one, Ty Dolla Sign's third, and the first for the other two performers. It debuted at number 36 on the US Rhythmic chart from the gain in airplay, later peaking at number 11 on April 20, 2024. On November 29, 2024, the track was awarded with a double platinum certification from the Recording Industry Association of America for amassing 2,000,000 certified units in the United States.

"Carnival" reached number two on the Canadian Hot 100, becoming West's 12th top-10 single in Canada. In Europe, the song initially reached number two on the Digital Singles chart for Greece, then fell one position and climbed to number one in its third week. After six weeks on the chart, the song was certified gold by IFPI Greece for reaching 1,000,000 streaming units in the region. The song further topped the charts of Iceland, Latvia, and Lithuania, reaching the top position in the first country after six weeks. It entered the Slovakia Singles Digitál Top 100 at number three, rising to the second position the next week. The song reached number three in the Czech Republic and Luxembourg, marking West's most successful release and second single to chart in the latter territory. "Carnival" debuted at number 12 on the UK Singles Chart, becoming the highest of the three entries from Vultures 1 in the United Kingdom. The song gradually rose on the chart, peaking at number five in its fourth week. In total, "Carnival" spent 10 weeks on the UK Singles Chart. On January 10, 2025, the song was certified gold by the British Phonographic Industry for amassing 400,000 units in the UK. The song performed similarly in Ireland, entering the Irish Singles Chart at number 18 as the highest of the album's three entries. It later climbed to number six on the chart after four weeks. The song also attained top 10 positions in Switzerland, Norway, Romania, and Austria.

Elsewhere, the track debuted at number 10 on the ARIA Singles Chart in Australia. The track ranked lower in the top 15 for the next two weeks on the chart, then rebounded to number five in its fourth week. "Carnival" debuted and peaked at number seven on the NZ Singles Chart of New Zealand, where it was certified platinum by Recorded Music NZ (RMNZ) for amassing 15,000 units on August 29, 2024. The track charted at number one on the IFPI's MENA Chart for the United Arab Emirates and number two on the Billboard Global 200, while peaking at number five on the MENA Chart for Middle Eastern and North African countries.

== Music video ==
After "Carnival" topped the Billboard Hot 100, an accompanying music video was released by West and Ty Dolla Sign on March 11, 2024. In a since-deleted Instagram post promoting the video, West said that the number-one was for Ty Dolla Sign, Rich the Kid, Playboi Carti, and his fans that remained loyal. West said it was "for the people who won't be manipulated by the system" too as he slammed Adidas and their employees, expressing that the company "tried to destroy" him and he was still able to reach number one. He also posted criticism of his rival Drake, Hailey Bieber, and the Daily Mail. The visual was directed by Rafman, while the computer-generated imagery (CGI) was created by Dario Alva and Garrett McGale.

The music video serves as a tribute to Inter Mlian's ultras, featuring CGI shots of them at a stadium during a football match. A shot of the song's artwork is shown around 20 seconds in and the "Vultures" logo appears several times, although West, Ty Dolla Sign, and the featured artists do not make any appearances in the video. Different male figures fight with each other in the stadium's celebrations, including skinheads and police troopers. Fires are started and some people who are attacked start bleeding, with the visuals inspired by football riots.

For The Atlantic, Kornhaber noted that the "mesmerizing" music video shows the likes of skinhead and police trooper figures in imagery that invokes "thoughts of factional war, male anger, and the apocalypse". HotNewHipHop's Zachary Hovarth described it as a "scroller-esque set of violent and raging CGI imagery", which evidently had the time and energy put in for the shots emulating "the vibe of the cut". Jon Powell of Revolt said the shots show "aggressive fans turning a stadium upside-down during an intense soccer match", while Guillaume Narduzzi of Pure Charts branded the video as "astonishing".

== Charts ==
=== Weekly charts ===
Weekly chart performance for "Carnival"
Chart (2024)	Peak position
Australia (ARIA)	5
Australia Hip Hop/R&B (ARIA)	1
Austria (Ö3 Austria Top 40)	10
Belgium (Ultratop 50 Flanders)	33
Canada Hot 100 (Billboard)	2
Czech Republic (Singles Digitál Top 100)	3
Denmark (Tracklisten)	13
Finland (Suomen virallinen lista)	20
France (SNEP)	119
Germany (GfK)	13
Global 200 (Billboard)	2
Greece International (IFPI)	1
Hungary (Single Top 40)	15
Iceland (Tónlistinn)	1
Ireland (IRMA)	6
Israel (Mako Hitlist)	37
Italy (FIMI)	61
Latvia Streaming (LaIPA)	1
Lithuania (AGATA)	1
Luxembourg (Billboard)	3
Middle East and North Africa (IFPI)	5
Netherlands (Single Top 100)	17
New Zealand (Recorded Music NZ)	7
Nigeria (TurnTable Top 100)	51
Norway (VG-lista)	6
Poland (Polish Streaming Top 100)	2
Portugal (AFP)	11
Romania (Billboard)	7
Slovakia (Singles Digitál Top 100)	2
South Africa Streaming (TOSAC)	5
Sweden (Sverigetopplistan)	34
Switzerland (Schweizer Hitparade)	4
United Arab Emirates (IFPI)	1
UK Singles (Official Charts)	5
UK Hip Hop/R&B (Official Charts)	1
UK Indie (Official Charts)	2
US Billboard Hot 100	1
US Hot R&B/Hip-Hop Songs (Billboard)	1
US Rhythmic Airplay (Billboard)	5

=== Year-end charts ===
Year-end chart performance for "Carnival"
Chart (2024)	Position
Australia (ARIA)	98
Australia Hip Hop/R&B (ARIA)	16
Austria (Ö3 Austria Top 40)	75
Canada (Canadian Hot 100)	34
Global 200 (Billboard)	99
Iceland (Tónlistinn)	26
Poland (Polish Streaming Top 100)	56
Switzerland (Schweizer Hitparade)	91
US Billboard Hot 100	38
US Hot R&B/Hip-Hop Songs (Billboard)	12
US Rhythmic (Billboard)	39

== Certifications ==
Certifications for "Carnival"
Region	Certification	Certified units/sales
Belgium (BRMA)	Gold	20,000^{‡}
Denmark (IFPI Danmark)	Gold	45,000^{‡}
New Zealand (RMNZ)	Platinum	30,000^{‡}
United Kingdom (BPI)	Gold	400,000^{‡}
United States (RIAA)	2× Platinum	2,000,000^{‡}
Streaming
Greece (IFPI Greece)	Gold	1,000,000^{†}
^{‡} Sales+streaming figures based on certification alone.^{†} Streaming-only figures based on certification alone.

== See also ==
- Fried (song)
