= Abstract Mindstate =

American hip hop duo

- Also known as: The Wonder Twins; Abstract Mindstate the M.O.D.
- Origin: Chicago, Illinois, U.S.
- Genres: Adult contemporary hip-hop; conscious hip hop; progressive hip hop; underground hip-hop; boom bap
- Years active: 1993–2008; 2021-present
- Labels: YZY SND; Honest Music; Barak With Love; Vydia
- Members: Olskool Ice-Gre; E.P. Da Hellcat
- Website: abstractmindstate.com

Abstract Mindstate is an American hip hop duo from Chicago, Illinois made up of emcees Greg "Olskool Ice-Gre" Lewis (Greg Lewis) and E.P. Da Hellcat (Daphne Mitchell). They are known for their socially conscious lyrics and adult contemporary hip hop music. The duo was formed in 1993 and were active until 2008, garnering a large following in Chicago and internationally. They reunited in 2018 and released the album, Dreams Still Inspire, in 2021.

== History ==
=== Formation and beginnings ===
Greg Lewis and Daphne Mitchell met while attending Jackson State University in 1990. They began working together, initially, as Olskool Ice-Gre managing and producing E.P. Da Hellacat as a solo artist but in 1993 they formed Abstract Mindstate. Before settling on the name Abstract Mindstate they were also known as The Wonder Twins and Abstract Mindstate the M.O.D.

In 1999, they released a seven track EP titled The Last Demo The EP, independently released on 4 The Soul. The EP earned the group the title of "WGCI Home Jam Artist of the Year and winning first place in the Salem Orb-e National Talent Competition. Consistent contest wins afforded Abstract Mindstate the opportunity to record their debut album We Paid Let Us In! (2001), produced by Gensu Dean, Kanye West, the Twilite Tone, DJ Self Born (formerly Gregg D), and Andy C. The album was never formally released and the duo went on a sixteen-year hiatus.

=== Later career ===
In 2018, at the request of Kanye West, the duo reunited and began recording again. They recorded 27 songs with West and narrowed it down to 11 tracks. In 2021, their album, Dreams Still Inspire, was released on YZY SND and received favorable reviews. That same year, the duo won a Hollywood Music in Media Award for "Best Independent Music Video" for "A Wise Tale." The Chicago Tribune wrote, "A Wise Tale" is precise in its charm and easily one of the best local tracks of the year, harking back to some of the glory days of Chicago's new millennium hip-hop aesthetic" In 2022, they were featured in the Netflix 3-part documentary Jeen-Yuhs.

In 2024, their second single, True Story (featuring Simthandile Mtolo) was nominated or a Hollywood Independent Music Award in the category of "Best Rap/Hip Hop." During 2021 - 2024 they toured the US and Europe with Slum Village.

In 2025, the duo released The Art Project, produced by Young RJ and featuring Blu, David Banner, J. Ivy, John Forté, Slum Village, Sly Piper, and others. The album's single, "Bar Louie (featuring David Banner)," won a Hollywood Independent Music Award for the category of "Best Adult Contemporary Hip Hop." That same year the duo released the documentary, We Paid Let Us In! The Legend of Abstract Mindstate, which aired on the Roku Channel.

== Awards ==
Year	Nominated work	Category	Award	Result
2025	Bar Louie (featuring David Banner)	Best Adult Contemporary Hip Hop	Hollywood Independent Music Award	Won
2024	True Story (featuring Simthandile Mtolo)	Best Rap/Hip Hop	Hollywood Independent Music Award	Nominated
2021	A Wise Tale	Best Independent Video	Hollywood Music in Media Award	Won

== Discography ==
- 1999 - The Last Demo (as Abstract Mindstate MOD)
- 2001 - We Paid Let Us In!
- 2005 - Chicago's Hardest Working Mixtape Vol. 1
- 2005 - Chicago's Hardest Working Mixtape Vol. 2
- 2008 - Chicago's Hardest Working Mixtape Vol. 3
- 2021 - Dreams Still Inspire
- 2025 - The Art Project
