= No Apologies (Consequence and Kanye West song) =

Single by Consequence featuring Kanye West

from the album Nice Doing Business With You
- Released: July 12, 2024
- Genre: Boom bap
- Length: 2:37
- Label: 192 Records
- Songwriters: Dexter Mills; Kanye West
- Producer: Consequence

Consequence singles chronology
| "Blood Stain 2" (2023) | "No Apologies" (2024) | "Blood Stain III" (2024) |

Kanye West singles chronology
| "Gimme a Second 2" (2024) | "No Apologies" (2024) | "Slide" (2024) |

"No Apologies" is a song by American rapper Consequence featuring fellow American rapper Kanye West. It was released on July 12, 2024, as a single via 192 Records. The song was later included on Consequence's 2024 studio album Nice Doing Business With You. The track was produced by Consequence, and its release followed public discussion of rumors related to West’s return after a false departure.

== Background and promotion ==
A promotional clip previewing "No Apologies" appears in an archived video dated February 2024. The single was officially released on July 12, 2024, with RapRadar documenting its arrival as a new release from Consequence featuring West. The song was included on Consequence's second studio album, Nice Doing Business With You, which was officially released on September 27, 2024.

Before the song's release, American rapper Rich the Kid claimed that West intended to quit rapping, later admitting the statement was for publicity. TMZ later reported on the situation in an article being updated following the release of “No Apologies,” mentioning its lyrics.

== Composition and lyrics ==
The song features boom-bap production, over which the two address their critics. West provides a spoken intro and interlude in addition to assistance on the hook, while Consequence issues rap-based takes for the song. Consequence's lyrics are described as braggadocious by RapRadar. The structure centers on the contrast between West’s conversational interjections and Consequence’s more traditional verse‑focused approach.

== Reception ==
"No Apologies" received positive reviews from critics. Music journalist Quincy Dominic gave the song a positive review on his website RatingsGameMusic, praising Consequence's lyrics and flow over the track's production. Maciej Werner credited the song as being "a fresh preview of the album 'Nice Doing Business With You'" on the Polish music website Blenderrap. Insomniac Magazine commended the duo's lyrics, entitling the track a 'sonic sizzler'. HotNewHipHop's Elias Andrews described the single as being in a "nostalgic mood," despite West’s inconsistent output during the period.

== Credits and personnel ==
Credits adapted from Tidal.

- Consequence – songwriter, composer, lyricist, beat maker, studio personnel, lead vocals
- Kanye West – lead vocals

== Charts ==
| Chart (2024) | Peak position |
|---|---|
| New Zealand Hot Singles (RMNZ) | 13 |
