= ¥$ =

American hip-hop supergroup

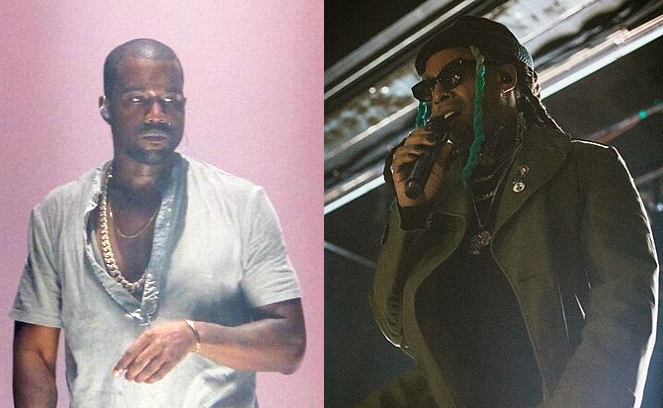
- Kanye West (left) and Ty Dolla Sign

Background information
- Genres: Hip-hop; trap; R&B
- Years active: 2023–present
- Label: YZY
- Members: Kanye West; Ty Dolla Sign

¥$ (pronounced "Ye n Dolla") is an American hip-hop superduo composed of rapper Kanye West and singer Ty Dolla Sign. With the two maintaining a strong relationship during 2023, West invited Ty Dolla Sign to record songs in Tokyo, Italy, and later Saudi Arabia. During this time, the duo began work on their first collaborative project, Vultures 1 (2024).

Despite mixed critical response, Vultures 1 debuted atop the US Billboard 200 and spawned the single "Carnival" (with Rich the Kid featuring Playboi Carti), which peaked atop the US Billboard Hot 100. After several delays, the duo's second album, Vultures 2 (2024), was released in August of that year; it received weaker sales—peaking at number 2 on the Billboard 200—and negative reception from critics, who felt the project was exceedingly unfinished.

They won Best Group at the BET Awards 2024.

== History ==
=== Background ===
American rapper Kanye West and singer Ty Dolla Sign began collaborating in September 2014 during the production of West's seventh studio album, The Life of Pablo. Ty Dolla Sign cowrote and provided vocals on two of its singles, "Real Friends" and "Fade".

Ty Dolla Sign also provided uncredited vocals on West's eighth studio album Ye (2018), on the tracks "All Mine", "Wouldn't Leave" and "Violent Crimes". That same year, the duo had recorded several songs intended for West's ninth studio album, known at the time as Yandhi, which was delayed indefinitely and ultimately scrapped. Ty Dolla Sign contributed to its unreleased tracks "New Body" and "Sky City", the latter of which was later included on Vultures 2. The following year, the album was re-announced as Jesus Is King, which, despite excluding the latter two songs from Yandhi, included the guest appearance from Ty Dolla Sign on "The Storm", retitled to "Everything We Need".

=== Formation and Vultures 1 ===
In October 2023, Ty Dolla Sign confirmed the existence of the duo and their upcoming album via an Instagram post displaying the name ¥$. During a performance in November 2023, he revealed that he had been working with West on the album in Saudi Arabia and that it would be "coming real soon". Videos of the artists recording with rapper Lil Baby also surfaced online.

West and Ty Dolla Sign spent three months recording Vultures 1 in Saudi Arabia, mostly in the city of al-Ula, according to collaborator DJ Camper. British singer ZLYAH, who West inspired, contributed to the writing of the track "Carnival". Record producer Fred Again played snippets of the song "Slide" at a club, leading to rumors that it'd be featured on the album.

The album's first public listening event was announced for February 8, 2024, at Chicago's United Center. Vultures 1 was released independently through West's YZY brand on February 10, 2024, commemorating the 20th anniversary of his debut album The College Dropout. It debuted at number one on the US Billboard 200.

=== Vultures trilogy ===
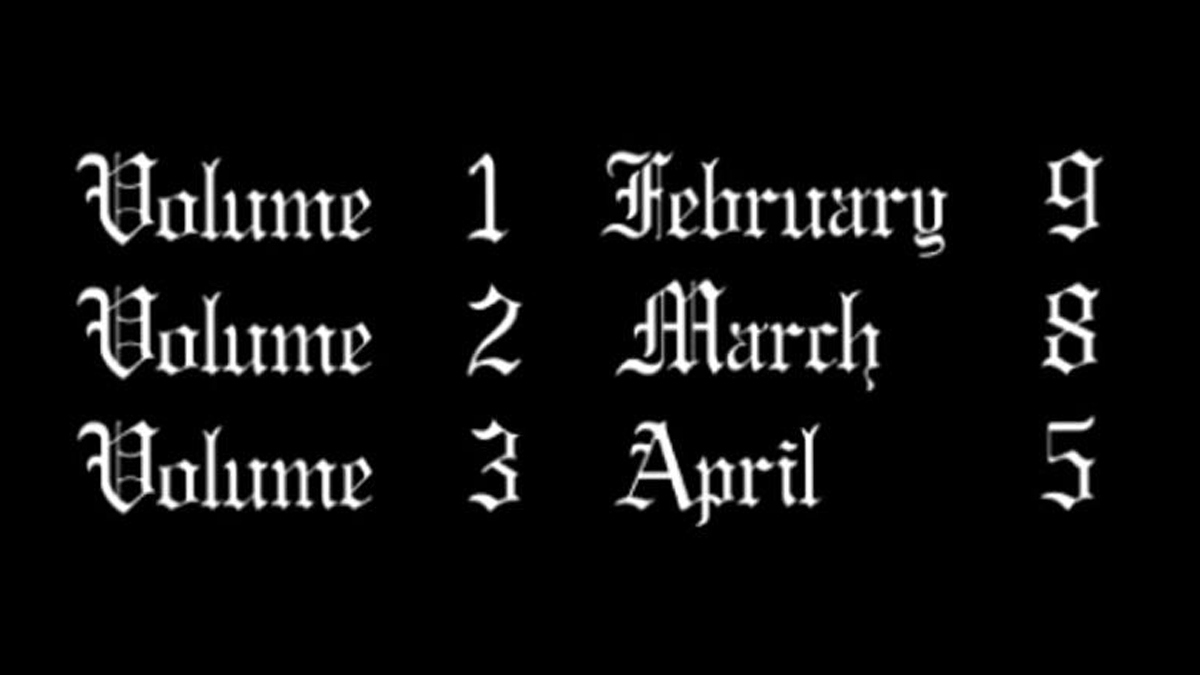
Original release dates for the Vultures trilogy.

On January 23, 2024, West revealed that the Vultures project would be released as a trilogy, with the first installment, Vultures 1, scheduled for release on February 9, 2024. The next volumes, Vultures 2 and 3, were scheduled to release on March 8 and April 5 respectively. The second volume, Vultures 2, was eventually released on August 3, while the third, Vultures 3, remains unreleased.

Vultures 1 was released independently through West's YZY record label on February 10, 2024. The album debuted at number one on the US Billboard 200 chart, becoming West's 11th consecutive number-one album and Ty Dolla Sign's first. It also reached the top spot in several other countries.

Vultures 2 was released on August 3, 2024. Producer Timbaland and rapper French Montana announced their involvement on the project. West stated that Vultures 2 would be sold exclusively on his Yeezy website for $20 instead of being released on streaming platforms like its predecessor. After several delays and uncertainty surrounding the release of Vultures 2, West confirmed the album's official release date. During an interview on Justin LaBoy's The Download podcast, which aired on April 22, 2024, West revealed that Vultures 2 will be released on May 3. This announcement aligned with the date West had previously leaked to a Baby Keem fan page in March when he mistakenly thought the account was the rapper's actual profile. Tracks such as "River" featuring Young Thug, the Backstreet Boys-sampling "Everybody" featuring Charlie Wilson, who also appears in "Matthew" along with West's daughter North, "Promotion" featuring Future, "Slide", and "Field Trip" with Playboi Carti, Kodak Black, Lil Durk, and Don Toliver were all teased. "Slide" was released as the lead single on August 2, 2024, and a few hours later on August 3, Vultures 2 was released through West's YZY brand. The album debuted at number 2 on the US Billboard 200 chart, falling short to Taylor Swift's The Tortured Poets Department.

The third installment, Vultures 3, remains unreleased. In January 2025, Ty Dolla Sign said the album was still planned to release and would "rip heads off". He reaffirmed this during a March performance with Peso Pluma, despite West having sparked controversy for antisemitic rants on Twitter in the preceding month. In February, Ty Dolla Sign previewed the ¥$ song "Don't Kill the Party" on a livestream with the American rapper Tyga, who also featured on the track. In April, West indicated that Vultures 3 had been canceled due to his antisemitic statements, which had strained his relationship with Ty Dolla Sign. West said he wanted to release it, but Ty Dolla Sign had stopped talking to him. In November, after West met with the Israeli-Moroccan rabbi Yoshiyahu Yosef Pinto to apologize, Ty Dolla Sign said he forgave West. In August 2026, West brought Ty Dolla Sign as a special guest at his concert in New Orleans. Ty Dolla Sign announced later that month that Vultures 3 was still planned.

==== Controversy ====
The original artwork for Vultures 1, revealed by West in January 2024, was believed to be inspired by the cover art for Filosofem—an album by black metal artist Burzum (handled and maintained by musician Varg Vikernes) as well as painter Caspar David Friedrich, with the album title's font resembling Burzum's typeface. West was also photographed in 2024 wearing a Burzum shirt while standing beside JPEGMafia. Vultures 1 was released with a new cover art featuring a photograph of West completely obscured by all-black clothing, including an opaque head covering, standing next to his partner, Bianca Censori, with her back turned, wearing stockings and a sheer black cloth around her waist. With the announcement of Vultures 2, the duo revealed the cover for the album featuring Ty Dolla Sign wearing a leather jacket and a mask, standing in the center of a brown background while holding a picture of his brother, Big TC.

== Tour dates ==
List of tour dates for the Vultures Listening Experience
Date (2024)	City	Country	Venue
February 8	Chicago	United States	United Center
February 9	Elmont	United States	UBS Arena
February 11	Las Vegas	United States	Wynn Las Vegas
February 22	Milan	Italy	Forum di Milano
February 24	Bologna	Italy	Unipol Arena
February 25	Paris	France	Accor Arena
March 10	Phoenix	United States	Footprint Center
March 12	San Francisco	United States	Chase Center
March 14 (Note: This date was part of Rolling Loud.)	Inglewood	United States	SoFi Stadium
August 9	Salt Lake City	United States	Delta Center
August 23	Goyang	South Korea	Goyang Stadium
September 15	Haikou	China	Wuyuan River Stadium
September 28	Haikou	China	Wuyuan River Stadium

== Discography ==
=== Studio albums ===
List of studio albums, with release date, label, and selected chart positions shown
Title	Album details	Peak chart positions							Certifications
Title	Album details	US	AUS	CAN	NOR	NZ	SWE	UK	Certifications
Vultures 1	Released: February 10, 2024; Label: YZY; Format: CD, LP, digital download, streaming	1	1	1	1	1	2	2	RIAA: Gold; BPI: Silver; IFPI DEN: Gold
Vultures 2	Released: August 3, 2024; Label: YZY; Format: Digital download, streaming	2	4	1	2	3	9	7	
"—" denotes a recording that did not chart or was not released in that territory.

=== Singles ===
List of singles with selected chart positions, showing year released and album name
Title	Year	Peak chart positions										Certifications	Album
Title	Year	US	US R&B/HH	US Rap	AUS	CAN	GER	IRE	NZ	UK	WW	Certifications	Album
"Vultures" (featuring Bump J and Lil Durk)	2023	34	15	11	95	24	—	—	39	— (Note: "Vultures" did not enter the UK Singles Chart, but peaked at number seven on the UK Independent Singles Chart.)	27		Vultures 1
"Talking / Once Again" (featuring North West)	2024	30	12	9	66	30	—	—	32	— (Note: "Talking / Once Again" did not enter the UK Singles Chart, but peaked at number 14 on the UK Independent Singles Chart and number 70 on the UK Audio Streaming Chart.)	18		Vultures 1
"Carnival" (with Rich the Kid featuring Playboi Carti)	2024	1	1	1	5	2	13	6	7	5	2	RIAA: 2× Platinum; BPI: Gold; BEA: Gold; RMNZ: Platinum	Vultures 1
"Like That Remix" (with Future and Metro Boomin)	2024	—	—	—	—	—	—	—	—	—	—		Non-album single
"Gimme a Second 2" (with Rich the Kid and Peso Pluma)	2024	—	—	—	—	—	—	—	— (Note: "Gimme a Second 2" did not enter to NZ Top 40 Singles chart, but peaked at 16 on the NZ Hot 40 Singles chart.)	—	—		Life's a Gamble
"Slide"	2024	88	25	22	—	84	—	—	— (Note: "Slide" did not enter the NZ Top 40 Singles Chart, but peaked at number four on the NZ Hot Singles Chart.)	92	154		Vultures 2
"—" denotes a recording that did not chart or was not released in that territory.

=== Other charted songs ===
List of charting songs, with selected chart positions, showing year released and album name
Title	Year	Peak chart positions										Album
Title	Year	US	US R&B	US Rap	AUS	CAN	GER	IRL	NZ	UK	WW	Album
"Stars"	2024	39	17	12	34	29	—	—	30	—	26	Vultures 1
"Keys to My Life" (featuring India Love)	2024	55	25	20	59	42	—	—	—	—	48	Vultures 1
"Paid"	2024	53	23	18	44	38	—	—	—	—	42	Vultures 1
"Back to Me" (featuring Freddie Gibbs)	2024	26	11	8	27	22	—	21	19	18	16	Vultures 1
"Hoodrat"	2024	67	31	25	88	57	—	—	—	—	81	Vultures 1
"Do It" (featuring YG)	2024	52	22	17	52	37	—	—	—	—	47	Vultures 1
"Paperwork" (featuring Quavo)	2024	64	29	24	80	53	—	—	—	—	57	Vultures 1
"Burn"	2024	33	14	10	24	19	—	22	13	17	21	Vultures 1
"Fuk Sumn" (featuring Playboi Carti and Travis Scott)	2024	23	10	7	33	17	98	—	10	100	13	Vultures 1
"Beg Forgiveness" (featuring Chris Brown)	2024	65	30	—	93	54	—	—	—	—	72	Vultures 1
"Good (Don't Die)"	2024	93	43	—	—	76	—	—	—	—	142	Vultures 1
"Problematic"	2024	79	37	—	—	60	—	—	—	—	97	Vultures 1
"King"	2024	94	44	—	—	73	—	—	—	—	154	Vultures 1
"Time Moving Slow"	2024	— (Note: "Time Moving Slow" did not enter the Billboard Hot 100, but peaked at number 22 on the Bubbling Under Hot 100 chart.)	39	—	—	—	—	—	—	—	—	Vultures 2
"Field Trip" (with Playboi Carti and Don Toliver featuring Kodak Black)	2024	48	10	8	88	41	—	—	— (Note: "Field Trip" did not enter the NZ Top 40 Singles Chart, but peaked at number three on the NZ Hot Singles Chart.)	65	33	Vultures 2
"Fried"	2024	87	24	21	—	80	—	—	— (Note: "Fried" did not enter the NZ Top 40 Singles Chart, but peaked at number eight on the NZ Hot Singles Chart.)	—	151	Vultures 2
"Promotion" (with Future)	2024	76	21	18	—	73	—	—	— (Note: "Promotion" did not enter the NZ Top 40 Singles Chart, but peaked at number five on the NZ Hot Singles Chart.)	94	138	Vultures 2
"Lifestyle" (with Lil Wayne)	2024	—	41	—	—	—	—	—	—	—	—	Vultures 2
"River" (with Young Thug)	2024	— (Note: "River" did not enter the Billboard Hot 100, but peaked at number 11 on the Bubbling Under Hot 100 chart.)	32	—	—	—	—	—	—	—	—	Vultures 2
"530"	2024	— (Note: "530" did not enter the Billboard Hot 100, but peaked at number 16 on the Bubbling Under Hot 100 chart.)	37	—	—	—	—	—	—	—	—	Vultures 2
"Dead" (with Future and Lil Durk)	2024	— (Note: "Dead" did not enter the Billboard Hot 100, but peaked at number 19 on the Bubbling Under Hot 100 chart.)	38	—	—	—	—	—	—	—	—	Vultures 2
"—" denotes a recording that did not chart or was not released in that territory.

=== Appearances together ===
Title	Year	Artist(s)	Album
"Only One"	2014	Kanye West, Paul McCartney, Ty Dolla Sign	Non-album singles
"The Summer League"	2015	Wale, Ty Dolla Sign, Kanye West	Non-album singles
"Guard Down"	2015	Ty Dolla Sign, Kanye West, Diddy	Free TC
"Real Friends"	2016	Kanye West, Ty Dolla Sign	The Life of Pablo
"Fade"	2016	Kanye West, Post Malone, Ty Dolla Sign	The Life of Pablo
"All Mine"	2018	Kanye West, Ty Dolla Sign, Ant Clemons	Ye
"Wouldn't Leave"	2018	Kanye West, PartyNextDoor, Ty Dolla Sign, Jeremih	Ye
"Violent Crimes"	2018	Kanye West, Ty Dolla Sign, 070 Shake, Nicki Minaj	Ye
"Freeee (Ghost Town, Pt. 2)"	2018	Kids See Ghosts, Ty Dolla Sign	Kids See Ghosts
"Everything We Need"	2019	Kanye West, Ty Dolla Sign, Ant Clemons	Jesus Is King
"Ego Death"	2020	Ty Dolla Sign, Kanye West, FKA Twigs, Skrillex	Featuring Ty Dolla Sign
"Track 6"	2020	Ty Dolla Sign, Kanye West, Anderson .Paak, Thundercat	Featuring Ty Dolla Sign
"Junya pt 2"	2021	Kanye West, Playboi Carti, Ty Dolla Sign	Donda
"Wheels Fall Off"	2025	Ty Dolla Sign, Kanye West	Non-album single
