= YZY (record label) =

American record label

Yeezy Record Label, LLC
- Founded: September 26, 2022; 4 years ago
- Founder: Kanye West
- Distributor: Gamma (only Kanye West since 2026)
- Genre: Hip-hop; R&B; trap
- Country of origin: United States
- Location: Los Angeles, California

Yeezy Record Label, LLC (doing business as YZY) is an American independent record label founded by rapper Kanye West, following his departure from Def Jam in 2021. Based in Los Angeles, California, the label specializes in hip-hop, R&B and trap music. It is distributed by Gamma. YZY was established as the successor to West's earlier record label, GOOD Music, which he founded in 2004. Before its formation, West had announced plans for a separate record label in 2020 named YZY SND, which later became YZY.

The label has released one number-one US Billboard Hot 100 single as well as one number-one US Billboard 200 album, "Carnival" and Vultures 1 (2024) by ¥$, a superduo consisting of West and singer Ty Dolla Sign.

== History ==
=== Prior efforts ===
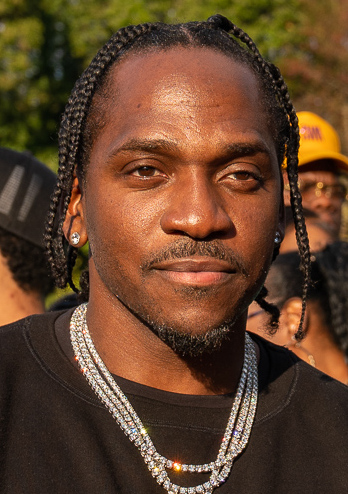
Pusha T, President of West's record label GOOD Music from 2015 to 2022.

West founded his record label GOOD Music in 2004, shortly after the release of his debut album The College Dropout. The label entered a distribution contract with the Island Def Jam Music Group in 2011, and released its only compilation album, Cruel Summer the following year.

In 2023, a video of West from 2018 leaked online, where he publicly stated that he needed to "get rid of GOOD Music." Four years later, Def Jam announced that GOOD Music was no longer distributed by their label after West's antisemitic comments. On December 19, 2022, West's longtime collaborator Pusha T announced that he was no longer on speaking terms with him and had stepped down as President of GOOD Music after seven years. Although West has not released music through the label since 2021, GOOD Music has not officially dissolved.

In July 2020, West had announced plans for a record label and streaming service named YZY SND (Yeezy Sound), with a proposed roster consisting of Abstract Mindstate, Clipse, Cyhi the Prynce, KayCyy, West's daughter North, and the Wrldfms Tony Williams. Abstract Mindstate were the only artists to release music through the label, who released their sixth studio album, Dreams Still Inspire (2021), through YZY SND. Though KayCyy has no releases with the label, he stated in an August 2021 interview with Complex that he was its first signed artist. The label officially dissolved on November 9, 2022.

=== 2022–2024: Formation and Vultures ===
YZY was incorporated in Melrose Avenue, Los Angeles, on September 26, 2022. In November 2023, West and singer Ty Dolla Sign formed the superduo ¥$, releasing "Vultures" as the lead single for their debut studio album, Vultures 1 (2024). Vultures 1 became YZY's first album to top the Billboard 200, with its single "Carnival" becoming the label's first song to reach number-one on the US Billboard Hot 100. On June 20, 2024, Ty Dolla Sign announced that Vultures 2 would be exclusively released on West's unreleased YZY app during a livestream on Kick. However, upon its release in August 2024, the album was instead made available on multiple streaming platforms under YZY. The album debuted at number 2 on the US Billboard 200.

=== 2025–present: Bully and partnership with Gamma ===
West's visual album, Bully V1, as well as the re-release of his eleventh studio album, Donda 2, were released through the label in 2025. The Bully track "Beauty and the Beast" was briefly available on his website, yeezy.com, before being removed. In March, West announced that singer Jasmine Williams, who had previously featured on his song "Lonely Roads", had signed to the label. Three months later, West released the songs "Preacher Man", "Beauty and the Beast", and "Damn" as part of a three-track extended play through the label. A week later, West released the songs "Last Breath" and "Losing Your Mind".

On January 28, 2026, West signed a record deal with media company Gamma for the release of Bully, with the final version of it also releasing through YZY alongside Gamma on March 28. In May, Gamma filed a lawsuit after two websites accused the company and its CEO, Larry Jackson, of streaming manipulation and embezzlement. The websites alleged that Gamma's reported sales and streaming figures for Bully had been inflated. Three months after the album's release, West issued a deluxe edition of Bully. In October, West's producer and affiliate Digital Nas revealed that he had received no royalties from his work with West under his YZY deal. He had earlier reprimanded West for not crediting him on the track, "Carnival".

== Roster ==
=== Current artists ===
Act	Year signed	Releases under the label
Kanye West	Founder	2
¥$	2023	2
Jasmine "Jaas" Williams	2025	—

=== Artists for YZY SND ===
Act	Year signed	Releases under the label
Kanye West	Founder	—
KayCyy	2020	—
Abstract Mindstate	2020	1

=== In-house producers ===
Producer	Year signed
1srael	2024

== Discography ==
=== Studio albums ===
Artist	Album	Details
¥$	Vultures 1	Released: February 10, 2024; Chart position: #1 U.S.; RIAA certification: Gold
¥$	Vultures 2	Released: August 3, 2024; Chart position: #2 U.S.; RIAA certification: —
Kanye West	Donda 2	Released: April 29, 2025; Chart position: —; RIAA certification: —
Kanye West	Bully (released with Gamma)	Released: March 28, 2026; Chart position: #2 U.S.; RIAA certification: —

=== Visual albums ===
Artist	Album	Details
Kanye West	Bully V1	Released: March 18, 2025; Chart position: —; RIAA certification: —

== See also ==
- Yeezy (company)
- GOOD Music
