= Ye Live Concert Tour =

2026 concert tour by Kanye West

- Tour by Kanye West
- Promotional image from website
- Location: Asia; Europe; North America
- Associated album: Bully
- Start date: April 1, 2026
- End date: March 19, 2027
- Legs: 1
- No. of shows: 21
- Website: tour.yeezy.com
Kanye West tour chronology
Saint Pablo Tour (2016)	Ye Live Concert Tour (2026–27)

The Ye Live Concert Tour is the ongoing seventh headlining concert tour by American rapper Kanye West, in support of his twelfth studio album, Bully (2026). It commenced on April 1, 2026, in Inglewood, California at the SoFi Stadium and is his first concert tour in a decade, following the Saint Pablo Tour in 2016.

West collaborated with Aus Taylor to design the tour's staging, which features a large spherical-shaped spinning main stage that projects visuals. The tour recorded large ticket sales and attendances, reportedly selling 118,000 tickets for a show (setting the all-time record for the largest stadium performance) in Istanbul. It also generated controversy on social media and news cycles related to the cancellation of multiple concerts due to West's previous antisemitic statements.

== Production ==
Iteration of the spherical main stage, accompanied by laser light displays, seen during a concert in Tampa, Florida.

=== Stage ===
The Ye Live Concert Tour features a large spherical-shaped main stage, which projects visuals of the Earth and Moon spinning around throughout the performance. West explained themes of return and revival as inspiration for the stage design, likening it to "standing on top of the world after everything we've been through". The stage was designed by West and Aus Taylor, with lighting being provided by John McGuire.

== Commercial performance ==
The tour's second show at SoFi Stadium grossed $18 million, becoming one of the world's highest-grossing concerts. The May 30 show in Istanbul sold 118,000 tickets, making it the largest single show attendance for a West concert; West later claimed the show broke the all-time record for the largest stadium performance. West's Alamodome concert, which grossed around $9 million, was noted for providing an economic boost to local hotels in San Antonio, with reservations in the area increasing by 22 percent.

West successfully conducted his first ever show in Indonesia on October 24 at the Gelora Bung Karno Stadium in Jakarta. As the only stop in Southeast Asia and Oceania this year, the show drew more than 70,000 attendees, including 20,500 international fans coming mostly from neighboring countries like Australia, Singapore, Malaysia, Thailand, and the Philippines. According to the organizer, fans from 80+ countries flew in to Jakarta for the show. The ticket sales for the single night show grossed $18 million, while the economic boost resulting from concert reached as much as $33.1 million.

== Controversy ==
Geographic distribution of concerts for the Ye Live Concert Tour (as of November 4 2026): Concert(s) held Future concert(s) planned Concert(s) cancelled or preempted Concert(s) not planned

From 2022 to 2025, West drew widespread condemnation, and lost sponsors and partnerships, for expressing antisemitic views and sympathizing with Nazi ideology, before issuing an official apology in 2026. These comments affected West's ability to perform in certain markets, particularly within Europe, as several planned concerts were cancelled or blocked by government authorities.

In April 2026, the United Kingdom revoked West's authorization to enter the country, preventing him from headlining Wireless Festival that July, prompting the event's cancellation. Other European performances were postponed or cancelled amid political pressure or public opposition between April and June 2026. French, Polish and Italian authorities cancelled the June 11 concert in Marseille, June 19 concert in Chorzów, and July 18 concert in Reggio Emilia, respectively, while the July 25 concert in Prague was cancelled after the venue prematurely ended its agreement to host West following public and political pressure. West's planned but then-unannounced June concert at St. Jakob Park in Basel was blocked by venue owners FC Basel, citing the club's "values".

West was able to perform in Istanbul on May 30, Arnhem on June 6 and 8, Tbilisi on June 12, Madrid on July 30, and in Algarve on August 7. West's appearance in the Netherlands received scrutiny from some politicians and Jewish organizations, but Dutch authorities and courts, citing the nation's constitutional freedom of speech laws, concluded that there was insufficient legal basis to bar him from entering the country or performing. In June, Senator Rick Scott urged the Tampa Sports Authority to cancel West's shows in the city. Later that month, the mayor of San Antonio, Gina Ortiz Jones expressed support for the cancellation of West's concert in San Antonio stating: "Standing up to antisemitism is exactly what it takes to achieve a more perfect Union". Both of these shows eventually went ahead as planned.

== Setlist ==
This set list is representative of the show in Tirana, performed on July 11, 2026, and is not representative of every show on the tour.

1. "King"
2. "Father Stretch My Hands, Pt. 1"
3. "Can't Tell Me Nothing"
4. "Niggas in Paris"
5. "Mercy"
6. "Praise God"
7. "Black Skinhead"
8. "On Sight"
9. "Blood on the Leaves"
10. "Carnival"
11. "Power"
12. "Bound 2"
13. "Fade"
14. "Say You Will"
15. "Heartless"
16. "All the Love"
17. "Highs and Lows"
18. "Beauty and the Beast"
19. "I Can't Wait"
20. "Father"
21. "Everybody"
22. "Famous"
23. "American Boy"
24. "Jesus Walks"
25. "All Falls Down"
26. "Through the Wire"
27. "Gold Digger"
28. "Touch the Sky"
29. "Good Life" (with intro from "P.Y.T. (Pretty Young Thing)")
30. "Homecoming"
31. "All of the Lights"
32. "Flashing Lights"
33. "Stronger"
34. "Ghost Town"
35. "Moon"
36. "Runaway" (with outro elements from "Mama's Favorite")
37. "Hey Mama" (played from tape)

=== Notes ===
==== Guest appearances ====
- During both Inglewood shows, North West appeared to perform "Talking" and "Piercing on My Hand".
  - During the first show on April 1, Don Toliver joined to perform "Moon" and "E85".
  - During the second show on April 3, Travis Scott joined to perform "Father" and "Fein", CeeLo Green joined to perform "Bully", and Lauryn Hill joined to perform a mini-set of "Mystery of Iniquity", "All Falls Down", "Lost Ones", "Doo Wop (That Thing)" and "Believe What I Say"; her sons Zion and YG Marley also appeared to perform "Heartbeat", "Crisis" and "Praise Jah in the Moonlight".
- Before the start of the Tbilisi show on June 14, the Wrldfms Tony Williams appeared to perform "Georgia (On My Mind)".
- During the second Tampa show on June 28, Kodak Black appeared to perform "Roll in Peace" and "No Flockin", while North also appeared to perform "Talking" and "D!e".
- Before the start of the San Antonio show on July 4, Williams performed "The Star-Spangled Banner".
- During the Algarve show on August 7, North appeared to perform "H0w Sh0uld I F33l" and "Talking".
- During the New Orleans show on August 28, Ty Dolla Sign joined to perform "Everybody", "Carnival" and "Fade".
- During both Chicago shows, Big Sean and 2 Chainz joined to perform "Clique" and "Mercy"; Sean additionally performed "I Don't Fuck with You" during the first show, while 2 Chainz performed "Birthday Song" during the first show and "I'm Different" during the second show. Twista also joined to perform "Slow Jamz" and "Overnight Celebrity".
  - During the first show, Future joined to perform "Keep It Burnin" and "Fuck Up Some Commas".
  - During the second show, a multitude of guests joined, including Chief Keef, Rick Ross, Don Toliver, Travis Scott, Young Thug, CyHi, Really Doe, GLC, Consequence, Common, Lupe Fiasco and Kid Cudi.
- During the Houston show on October 31, Playboi Carti joined to perform "Carnival", "Off the Grid", "Sky", "Timeless", "Evil J0rdan" and Travis Scott's "Fein". North West also appeared to perform a remix of "Legacy", an unreleased song and "Talking".

==== Set list alterations ====
- During both Inglewood shows, West performed "This a Must", additionally performing "Wolves", "Punch Drunk", "Highs and Lows", "White Lines", "Bully" and "Last Breath" during the second show. "Homecoming", "Flashing Lights", "Stronger" and "Ghost Town" were cut during the first show, and "Touch the Sky" was cut in both shows.
- Starting from the first Arnhem show on June 6, "Gold Digger" and "American Boy" were added to the set list.
- During the first Tampa show on June 26, "Moon" was briefly played from tape. During the second show, "OK" played from tape as West walked to the stage, and "Ghost Town" was not performed.
- "Hey Mama" was only played at the Tirana show in commemoration of Donda West.
- Starting from the Madrid show on July 30, "Run This Town" was added to the set list, and "True Love" was added as an outro to "Runaway".
- During the Algarve show on August 7, "Moon" was played from tape before "Runaway".
- Starting from the New Orleans show, "Love Lockdown" was added to the set list.
- Both Chicago shows featured "Put On" and "Homecoming" as intros in place of "King", as well as performances of "No Church in the Wild", "Off the Grid", "I Wonder", "Champion" and "Heard 'Em Say". During the second show, West also performed "New Slaves", and "All My Life" was played as a tribute to Lil Durk.
- During the Jakarta show on October 24, a medley of "Dark Fantasy" and "Waves" was played from tape before "King".

== Tour dates ==
Date	City	Country	Venue	Tickets sold	Box office
April 1, 2026	Inglewood	United States	SoFi Stadium	149,000	$32,600,000
April 3, 2026	Inglewood	United States	SoFi Stadium	149,000	$32,600,000
May 30, 2026	Istanbul	Turkey	Atatürk Olympic Stadium	118,000	> $30,000,000
June 6, 2026	Arnhem	Netherlands	GelreDome	70,000	—N/a
June 8, 2026	Arnhem	Netherlands	GelreDome	70,000	—N/a
June 12, 2026	Tbilisi	Georgia	Dinamo Arena	70,000	—N/a
June 26, 2026	Tampa	United States	Raymond James Stadium	119,591	—N/a
June 28, 2026	Tampa	United States	Raymond James Stadium	119,591	—N/a
July 4, 2026	San Antonio	United States	Alamodome	61,077	$9,000,000
July 11, 2026	Tirana	Albania	Eagle Stadium	60,000	$39,200,525
July 30, 2026	Madrid	Spain	Metropolitano Stadium	68,000	—N/a
August 7, 2026	Algarve	Portugal	Estádio Algarve	34,000	—N/a
August 15, 2026 (Note: Postponed by one day due to weather conditions.)	Almaty	Kazakhstan	Almaty Central Stadium	31,000	—N/a
August 28, 2026	New Orleans	United States	Caesars Superdome	> 65,000	—N/a
September 3, 2026	Chicago	United States	Soldier Field	129,562	$29,800,000
September 4, 2026	Chicago	United States	Soldier Field	129,562	$29,800,000
October 24, 2026	Jakarta	Indonesia	Gelora Bung Karno Stadium	70,000	$18,000,000
October 31, 2026	Houston	United States	Reliant Stadium	80,210	—N/a
November 7, 2026	Arlington (Note: Marketed as Dallas in promotional material.)	United States	AT&T Stadium	83,132	$18,000,000
November 21, 2026	Glendale (Note: Marketed as Phoenix in promotional material.)	United States	State Farm Stadium	TBA	
March 19, 2027	Mexico City	Mexico	Estadio Azteca	TBA	

=== Cancelled shows ===
List of cancelled concerts
Date	City	Country	Venue	Reason
March 29, 2026	New Delhi	India	Jawaharlal Nehru Stadium	Security concerns
May 23, 2026	New Delhi	India	Jawaharlal Nehru Stadium	Security concerns
June 11, 2026	Marseille	France	Orange Vélodrome	West's previous antisemitic comments
June 19, 2026	Chorzów	Poland	Silesian Stadium	West's previous antisemitic comments
July 10, 2026	London	England	Wireless Festival	West's previous antisemitic comments
July 11, 2026	London	England	Wireless Festival	West's previous antisemitic comments
July 12, 2026	London	England	Wireless Festival	West's previous antisemitic comments
July 18, 2026 (Note: This date was part of Hellwatt Festival.)	Reggio Emilia	Italy	RCF Arena	Security concerns
July 25, 2026	Prague	Czech Republic	Prague-Velká Chuchle Racecourse	West's previous antisemitic comments
October 10, 2026	Saint Petersburg	Russia	Gazprom Arena	No agreement signed
October 11, 2026	Saint Petersburg	Russia	Gazprom Arena	No agreement signed

== See also ==
- Ye Live in Chicago
