= Ye Live in Chicago =

2026 concerts by Kanye West

- Concert by Kanye West
- Promotional image
- Location: Soldier Field
- Tour: Ye Live Concert Tour
- Date: September 3–4, 2026
- Attendance: Approximately 142,000 (both nights)
- Box office: $29.8 million

Ye Live in Chicago (stylized in all caps) was a two-night concert by American rapper Kanye West, held at Soldier Field in Chicago, Illinois, on September 3 and 4, 2026. First announced in June 2026, the two concerts, part of the Ye Live Concert Tour (2026) in support of West's twelfth studio album, Bully (2026), marked his first time performing in his hometown of Chicago since 2021, for the final Donda listening event. West performed songs from across his discography on an Earth and Moon-inspired stage and was joined by numerous guest rappers, including Kid Cudi, Lupe Fiasco, Common, Big Sean, 2 Chainz, Future, Twista, Young Thug, Travis Scott, Don Toliver, Rick Ross, and Chief Keef.

In April 2026, the Ye Live Concert Tour began with two concerts at SoFi Stadium in Inglewood, California, with the second show becoming one of the world's highest-grossing concerts. Despite continued financial success, several planned concerts from the tour were cancelled due to international condemnation of West's previous antisemitic statements. Prior to Chicago, West performed in four U.S. states and seven countries during the tour. The concerts received positive reviews from critics, especially the second night for its guest list and emotional moments. The second night also received attention for West's reunion with Cudi, who later defended their reunion. The concerts drew approximately 142,000 attendees, grossing $29.8 million.

== Background ==
In June 2026, two concerts in Chicago and one in San Antonio were announced as part of a trio of American concerts within the Ye Live Concert Tour. The tour was launched in support of West's twelfth studio album, Bully (2026), and started on April 1, 2026, with a concert at SoFi Stadium in Inglewood, California. A subsequent show at the venue grossed $18 million, becoming one of the world's highest-grossing concerts, and the tour continued to have successful commercial performance across its run. However, several planned concerts were cancelled due to pushback regarding West's previous antisemitic statements and sympathizing with Nazism. Following West's performances in Los Angeles and prior to Chicago, he performed in Tampa, San Antonio, and New Orleans domestically, and in multiple countries including Kazakhstan, Georgia, Albania, Spain, Turkey, the Netherlands, and Portugal.

Held at Soldier Field in Chicago, the Ye Live in Chicago concerts marked West's first performance in the city in five years, following a 2021 listening party for his album Donda that he hosted at the same stadium. Several publications dubbed the return a "homecoming". Merchandise stands opened prior to the concert on September 3, 2026, with CBS News reporting that West's fans had already formed long lines to buy the products. Due to West's previous antisemitic statements, members of the Anti-Defamation League (ADL) were present that same day. They trained venue workers to identify antisemitic symbols and statements in the event that either West or his fans made them, and began compiling a "best practices" guide. According to an ADL spokeswoman, they had the workers implement a zero-tolerance policy for any antisemitic behavior.

== Stage and production ==
Red lights flash as West performs on the Moon-like stage.

The stage, designed by West with frequent visual collaborator Aus Taylor, projected visuals of the Earth and Moon spinning around throughout the performance. West had previously likened it to "standing on top of the world after everything we've been through". Additional elements of the production included fluorescent, laser-like lights, originally created by John McGuire. For example, West's performance of "All of the Lights" (2010) contained a "gleaming light spectacle" similar to EDM festivals, in which "fluorescent laser beams" shot across the stadium.

The music and setlist were handled by West's music director André Troutman, who later told Complex that many of the first show's guest appearances and songs were chosen hours before the concert. During the shows, Troutman performed vocals through a talk box, managed the transitions between each song, and played live additions to the tracks alongside a group of West's touring musicians, including keyboardist Liston Gregory III, keybass player Carrice Whitley, sound effects engineer Nkenge 1x, and co-director Vancil "Coop" Cooper. Troutman compared his approach as director to creating the soundtrack to a movie, feeling that it was his "job" to match the visuals designed by West and Taylor.

== Guest appearances ==
West (right) and Kid Cudi performing together during the concert.

The first show featured appearances from rappers Twista, Big Sean, 2 Chainz, and Future. The second show featured appearances from Kid Cudi, Lupe Fiasco, Common, Twista, Consequence, GLC, Really Doe, Cyhi the Prynce, Young Thug, Travis Scott, Don Toliver, Rick Ross, 2 Chainz, Big Sean, and Chief Keef. On the first night, West performed with Big Sean on "Clique" (2012), "I Don't Fuck with You" (2014), and "Mercy" (2012), with "Mercy" additionally featuring 2 Chainz, before the two performed "Birthday Song" (2012). Later, West performed with Future on "Keep It Burnin" (2022) and "Fuck Up Some Commas" (2015), and with Twista on "Overnight Celebrity" (2004) and "Slow Jamz" (2003).

On the second night, while featuring the same collaborations with Big Sean and Twista, West performed with Chief Keef on "Love Sosa" and "Don't Like" (2012), 2 Chainz on "I'm Different" (2012), Rick Ross on "Devil in a New Dress" and "B.M.F. (Blowin' Money Fast)" (2010), Don Toliver on "OK" and "E85" (2026), Travis Scott on "Fein" (2023) and "Father" (2026), Young Thug on "Highlights" (2016) and "Lifestyle" (2014), Cyhi on "So Appalled" (2010), Really Doe on "We Major" (2005), GLC and Consequence on "Spaceship" (2004), Common on "The Light" (2000), and Lupe Fiasco on "Touch the Sky" (2005) and "Superstar" (2007). In the middle of the second concert, West played a recorded message from Lil Durk, who expressed gratitude for his support. At the time, Durk was on trial for murder-for-hire charges.

The appearances of Cudi and Sean followed periods of strained relationships between the rappers and West. Several publications described their appearances as symbolizing a reconciliation. Near the end of the second concert, West performed with Cudi on "Father Stretch My Hands, Pt. 1" (2016), "Ghost Town" (2018), and "Pursuit of Happiness (Nightmare)" (2009). West was reportedly seen crying on stage during their closing moments, before leaving, a clip of Donda West's voice "boomed throughout Soldier Field." Following the concert, Cudi called West his "brother" on X and defended him from online users criticizing their reunion, citing West's mental improvement since his manic episode in 2025.

== Reception ==
=== Attendance and performance ===
An early estimate by Christopher Borrelli of the Chicago Tribune suggested that a combined 120,000 seats were sold by late August. The concerts sold 129,562 tickets, according to Pollstar, while XXL reported total attendance of approximately 142,000. The concerts grossed $29.8 million in total, with $15.76 million coming from the second night. Pollstar noted the second concert was one of the highest-grossing single hip-hop concerts alongside West's previous show at SoFi Stadium.

=== Critical reception ===
Both shows received universal acclaim from critics. Will Lavin of Complex described the second concert as a "G.O.O.D. Music Reunion," praising its guest features and lengthy setlist. Rolling Stone's Peony Hirwani similarly praised its guest features, emphasizing Cudi's performance as an emotional moment. Hirwani also described the show as a reflection of West's complicated legacy. Antonio Johri of Complex called the concerts potentially West's "greatest show ever," praising the direction and describing the second night as a "one-of-one show." Michael Saponara of Billboard wrote that the show was a "star-studded homecoming show," emphasizing its multi-era coverage of West's discography. In another article, Saponara considered West's reconciliation with Cudi, the "All of the Lights" performances, and the former's reunion with early collaborators as significant moments of the concert.

== Setlists ==
Setlists adapted from Pitchfork:

Night 1:

1. "Homecoming"
2. "Father Stretch My Hands, Pt. 1"
3. "Can't Tell Me Nothing"
4. "Niggas in Paris"
5. "No Church in the Wild"
6. "Off the Grid"
7. "Praise God"
8. "Black Skinhead"
9. "On Sight"
10. "Blood on the Leaves"
11. "Carnival"
12. "Power"
13. "Fade"
14. "Love Lockdown"
15. "Bound 2"
16. "I Wonder"
17. "Champion"
18. "Heard 'Em Say"
19. "Say You Will" (with André Troutman)
20. "Heartless" (with André Troutman)
21. "King"
22. "Father"
23. "All the Love" (with André Troutman)
24. "I Can't Wait"
25. "Everybody"
26. "Famous"
27. "Run This Town"
28. "Clique" (with Big Sean)
29. "I Don't Fuck with You" (with Big Sean)
30. "Mercy" (with Big Sean and 2 Chainz)
31. "Birthday Song" (with 2 Chainz)
32. "Keep It Burnin" (with Future)
33. "Fuck Up Some Commas" (with Future)
34. "American Boy"
35. "Good Life"
36. "Overnight Celebrity" (with Twista)
37. "Slow Jamz" (with Twista)
38. "All Falls Down"
39. "Jesus Walks"
40. "Through the Wire"
41. "Gold Digger"
42. "All of the Lights"
43. "Flashing Lights"
44. "Stronger" (with André Troutman)
45. "Ghost Town"
46. "Runaway"

Night 2:

1. "Homecoming"
2. "Can't Tell Me Nothing"
3. "Niggas in Paris"
4. "Love Sosa" (with Chief Keef)
5. "I Don't Like" (with Chief Keef)
6. "Off the Grid"
7. "Praise God"
8. "Black Skinhead"
9. "New Slaves"
10. "On Sight"
11. "Blood on the Leaves"
12. "Clique" (with Big Sean)
13. "I Don't Fuck with You" (with Big Sean)
14. "Mercy" (with Big Sean and 2 Chainz)
15. "I'm Different" (with 2 Chainz)
16. "Carnival"
17. "Power"
18. "Fade"
19. "No Church in the Wild"
20. "Bound 2"
21. "Devil in a New Dress" (with Rick Ross)
22. "B.M.F. (Blowin' Money Fast)" (with Rick Ross)
23. "I Wonder"
24. "Champion"
25. "Heard 'Em Say"
26. "Heartless" (with André Troutman)
27. "King"
28. "OK" (with Don Toliver)
29. "E85" (with Don Toliver)
30. "All the Love" (with André Troutman)
31. "Fein" (with Travis Scott)
32. "Father" (with Travis Scott)
33. "I Can't Wait"
34. "Everybody"
35. "Famous"
36. "Run This Town"
37. "American Boy"
38. "Low Lights"
39. "Highlights" (with Young Thug)
40. "Lifestyle" (with Young Thug)
41. "So Appalled" (with Cyhi the Prynce)
42. "We Major" (with Really Doe)
43. "Spaceship" (with GLC and Consequence)
44. "All Falls Down"
45. "Overnight Celebrity" (with Twista)
46. "Slow Jamz" (with Twista)
47. "Jesus Walks"
48. "The Light" (with Common)
49. "Gold Digger"
50. "Touch the Sky" (with Lupe Fiasco)
51. "Superstar" (with Lupe Fiasco)
52. "All of the Lights"
53. "Flashing Lights" (with André Troutman)
54. "Stronger" (with André Troutman)
55. "Father Stretch My Hands, Pt. 1" (with Kid Cudi)
56. "Ghost Town" (with Kid Cudi)
57. "Pursuit of Happiness (Nightmare)" (with Kid Cudi)
58. "Runaway"
