= Preacher Man (Kanye West song) =

Promotional single by Kanye West

from the album Bully
- Released: June 20, 2025 (single); March 28, 2026 (album version)
- Recorded: 2024–2026
- Genre: Hip-hop
- Length: 3:01
- Label: YZY; Gamma
- Songwriters: Ye; Quentin Miller; Al Goodman; Sharon Seiger; Tyrone Johnson
- Producer: Ye

Music video
- "Preacher Man" on YouTube

"Preacher Man" (stylized in all caps) is a song by American rapper Kanye West from his twelfth studio album, Bully (2026). It was released to music streaming services on June 20, 2025, as one of the album's five promotional singles, alongside "Beauty and the Beast" and "Damn", via a 3-track extended play (EP). West solely produced the song and wrote it alongside Quentin Miller, who he began working with in 2023. A hip-hop song with minimalist production, it contains a sample of "To You with Love" by the Moments, with its writers also receiving songwriting credits as a result.

Upon the release of Bully, "Preacher Man" received generally positive reviews from music critics, with particular praise for its production and charismatic writing. Commercially, the song charted at number 57 on the Billboard Hot 100 and number 65 on the Canadian Hot 100. It additionally charted at number 112 on the Billboard Global 200, and performed best on the New Zealand Hot Singles chart, peaking at number 14, and appeared in charts for Portugal and the United Kingdom.

== Background and recording ==
While recording his collaborative album Vultures 1 (2024) with American singer Ty Dolla Sign, West began working with songwriter Quentin Miller in 2023. The two went on to co-write "Preacher Man" together in 2024, with Miller also contributing lyrics to the Bully tracks "Highs and Lows", "I Can't Wait", and "This One Here", among six others. West later discussed Miller's writing in a February 2025 interview with Justin Laboy, praising how he never felt the need to rewrite his lines. Before becoming part of the album, West offered the song to Canadian rapper Drake, who he quoted as rejecting it under the guise of not wanting to "spoil [West's] dreams".

"Preacher Man" was first played during West's show at Haikou's Wuyuan River Stadium on September 15, 2024, a destination on his Vultures 2 Listening Experience tour. Eleven days later, West posted a video on Instagram showing himself using the ASR-10 keyboard to create the song's instrumental. West once again previewed the track during his second performance at the stadium on September 28, where he debuted "Beauty and the Beast" and announced the album's title.

== Composition and lyrics ==
"Preacher Man"
An audio excerpt from "Preacher Man", showcasing the song switching from artificial intelligence-assisted vocals to recorded ones after the first verse.

Musically, "Preacher Man" features minimalist production, using an edited sample of "To You With Love" by the Moments that is layered with bass guitar played by John Scott. In its lyrics, West criticizes those who oppose him in a sneering, defiant tone, including people whom he perceives to have betrayed or extorted him. At one point, he also calls out a woman for hating sports but still sitting at courtside seats during such events and raps "I hate that God didn't make a couple more of me".

== Critical reception ==
The song received generally positive reviews. Vibe's Preezy Brown ranked it third among the 18 Bully tracks, writing "Balancing tension and swagger, 'Preacher Man' is both engaging and effortless, demonstrating Ye's ability to fuse narrative wit with addictive rhythm." Peter McGoran of Hot Press described West as "graceful and lucid" on the song. Peter A. Berry of Complex stated the song "features a nice blend of charisma and cinema." Reviewing Bully for Slant Magazine, Paul Attard cited "Preacher Man" as among the tracks that are "ingeniously incorporating dusty soul samples and strong melodies", but are "so tidy that they can't help but read like West is punching well below his musical weight class." Eddy "Precise" Lamarre of Rolling Out commented that the song's line This path I don't recommend "lands because it feels honest." Jeff Ihaza of Rolling Stone remarked the song "takes Ye's flair for cinematics" and "fires on all cylinders." Aron A. of HotNewHipHop opined that the song's production "made the album feel promising." Kieran Press-Reynolds of Pitchfork highlighted the transition in the first passage from a voice resembling AI-generated vocals to a more natural-sounding voice, describing it as an "interesting effect", "Especially because it leads into some of the most traditionally cocksure Ye lyrics on Bully". Billboard's Michael Saponara placed it at number 11 in his ranking of the 18 songs from Bully.

== Remix ==
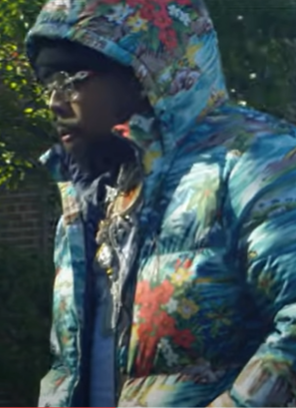
Westside Gunn (pictured in 2021) released a remix of "Preacher Man."

On April 5, 2026, American rapper Westside Gunn previewed a remix of "Preacher Man," performing a freestyle over the song's instrumental. West later reposted the clip on social media, following their previous work together during the Donda era. The remix was officially released on May 13, 2026, when Gunn debuted it on his Instagram account.

== Credits and personnel ==
Credits are adapted from Tidal and the Mechanical Licensing Collective.

- Ye – writing, production, programming, vocal production
- 88-Keys – additional production
- Quentin Miller – writing
- Al Goodman – writing (sampled)
- Sharon Seiger – writing (sampled)
- Tyrone Johnson – writing (sampled)
- John Scott – bass guitar, recording, mixing, mastering
- Josh Schuback – recording, mixing, mastering
- Nkenge 1x – mastering
- The Legendary Traxster – recording, mixing

== Charts ==
Chart performance for "Preacher Man"
Chart (2025–2026)	Peak position
Canada Hot 100 (Billboard)	65
Global 200 (Billboard)	112
Netherlands (Single Tip)	8
New Zealand Hot Singles (RMNZ)	14
Portugal (AFP)	131
UK Hip Hop/R&B (Official Charts)	28
UK Indie (Official Charts)	45
US Billboard Hot 100	57
US Hot R&B/Hip-Hop Songs (Billboard)	17
US R&B/Hip-Hop Airplay (Billboard)	14
