= Bully (album) =

2026 studio album by Kanye West

Studio album by Kanye West
- Released: March 28, 2026
- Recorded: 2021–2026
- Genre: Hip-hop
- Length: 30:12 (physical); 42:26 (streaming); 46:56 (deluxe edition)
- Languages: English; Spanish
- Labels: YZY; Gamma
- Producers: Ye; 2 Vicious (Note: Composed of Che Pope and Just da 1.); 88-Keys; André Troutman; Audio Jacc; Dean Durkin; Hassan Khaffaf; Jahaan Sweet; Jambo; the Legendary Traxster; Liston Gregory III; McEvoy; Mike Moore; Nkenge 1x; Quadwoofer; RaMu; Sheffmade; TK the Legend; Travis Scott

Kanye West chronology
Vultures 2 (2024)	Bully (2026)

Deluxe cover

Bully (Note: Stylized in all caps or in Japanese as ブリー (Burī). Written as いじめっ子 (Ijimekko) lit. 'Bully' on certain merchandise designs.) is the twelfth studio album by the American rapper and record producer Kanye West. (Note: Credited as "Ye" on physical editions of the album. Credited under both "Kanye West" and "Ye" on streaming releases, with only "Ye" being used in individual song credits.) It was released through YZY and Gamma on March 28, 2026. (Note: Bully was reported to release physically on March 27, with a streaming release the following day. This article uses March 28 for consistency.) Guest appearances include Travis Scott, André Troutman, Nine Vicious, CeeLo Green, and Peso Pluma; a deluxe version, released on June 19, adds Lauryn Hill, Don Toliver, and the Wrldfms Tony Williams. Production was mainly handled by West, Troutman, the Legendary Traxster, Nkenge 1x, and 88-Keys, with contributions from various others.

West began working on Bully after the releases of Vultures 1 and Vultures 2 (both 2024), and announced the album in September 2024. He surprise-released multiple work-in-progress versions via X on March 18, 2025, accompanied by the Bully V1 short film, directed by West and edited by Hype Williams. It stars West's son, Saint, who fights New Japan Pro-Wrestling wrestlers with a toy mallet. Following Bully V1, West delayed the album several times while promoting it with two extended play previews in June 2025. In March 2026, he released the album on physical formats. Shortly after, he premiered it at a listening party in Inglewood livestreamed on YouTube, which was then removed. Hours later, Bully was released to streaming services with a different tracklist, along with the music video for "Father".

Sonically, Bully extensively relies on sampling and interpolations, and West mostly sings instead of rapping. The album features industrial-based production and tracks reminiscent of West's early work, with the lyrics centered on grief, isolation, ego, detachment, and emotional fatigue. Most of West's vocals in the Bully V1 and physical releases were artificial intelligence-generated audio deepfakes. West re-recorded most lyrics with his own vocals for the final release, with mixing and mastering redone by Irko for the deluxe verison.

Bully polarized critics, who praised the production but were divided over whether it was a return to form for West or overly imitative of his past work. The album charted within the top five in Australia, Austria, Belgium, Canada, Denmark, Hungary, Ireland, Lithuania, the Netherlands, New Zealand, Poland, Portugal, Slovakia, Sweden, Switzerland, the United Kingdom, and the United States. To promote the album, West is headlining the international Ye Live Concert Tour, starting with two concerts at SoFi Stadium in early April. The deluxe edition is nominated for Best Rap Album at the 2027 Grammys, which is set to take place in February 2027.

== Background ==
According to the producer Mike Dean, West began working on the Bully song "Beauty and the Beast" during the sessions for his tenth album Donda (2021). West offered the song "Preacher Man" to the Canadian rapper Drake, who declined, before incorporating it into Bully. In 2024, West collaborated with the American singer Ty Dolla Sign to release the collaborative albums Vultures 1 and Vultures 2 as ¥$. Vultures 1 was subject to mixed reviews, while Vultures 2 was panned for being released in an unfinished state and its use of artificial intelligence (AI).

In February 2024, the producer Erick Sermon said that West had been working on a solo album, Y3, before putting it aside to work on Vultures. Sermon said he contributed to Y3 in 2023; West denied his story. On September 26, 2024, West posted a video on Instagram showing himself producing a beat with a "sped-up soul sample" on an ASR-10 keyboard. The beat sounded similar to "Preacher Man", which he previewed at a concert in China earlier that month. Two days later, during his performance at the Wuyuan River Stadium in Haikou, China, West announced Bully, previewing "Beauty and the Beast" and "Preacher Man".

== Production ==
=== 2024 ===
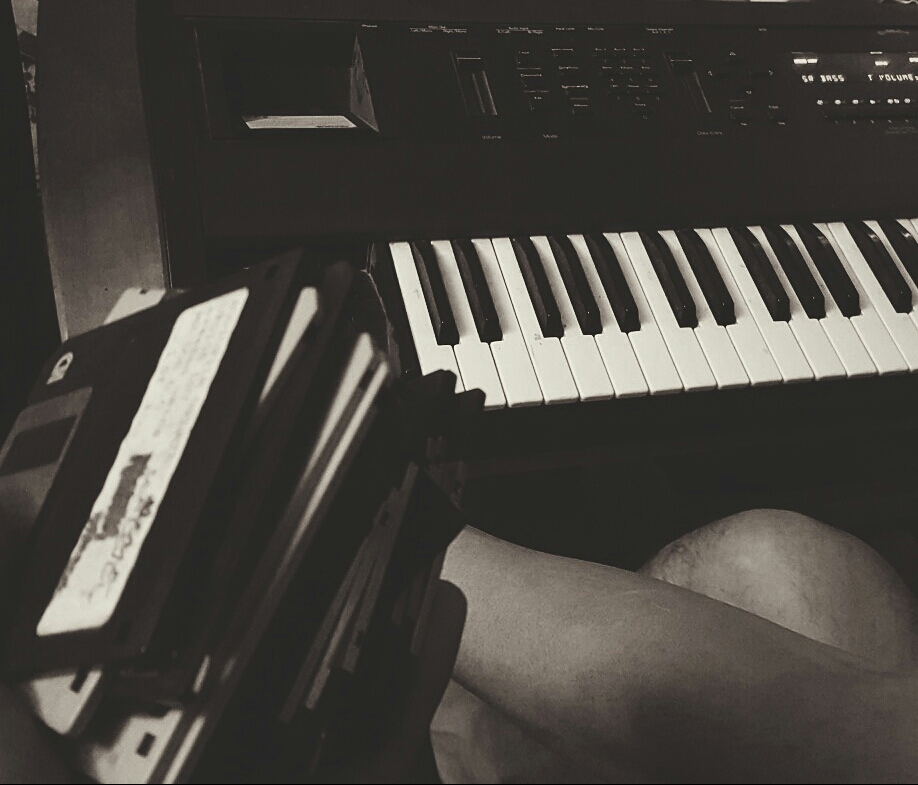
The Ensoniq ASR-10 was used by West on the early stages of Bully's production, including "Preacher Man" and "Beauty and the Beast".

Following the Vultures releases, record producer Digital Nas shared text messages from West indicating his intention to go into "full art studio mode". American music journalist Touré reported that Bully would be a concept album inspired by West's solitude living in Tokyo, with West as its sole producer. He further stated that it was common for other producers and writers to help West while he came up with the overall concept for previous albums, in contrast to this period of a "fresh chapter in his life" where he is able to be whoever he wants.

Though Touré claimed that West worked on Bully by himself and effectively lived in isolation, West invited collaborators Don Toliver and Baby Keem to Tokyo the same month as the report, and mentioned on an April 2025 livestream with Digital Nas that the album would feature co-writing from Quentin Miller, Ty Dolla Sign, Toliver, Malik Yusef, and Billy Walsh. In October 2024, Japanese musician Yojiro Noda of the rock band Radwimps was invited to do live instrumentation for the album, with him and a group of session musicians contributing to the tracks "Beauty and the Beast", "Bully", "Circles", "Highs and Lows", and "White Lines" on the final album. Engineer Josh Schuback began working on tracks after finishing his mixing of Vultures 2, which he was asked to do after being invited to a studio session where West created beats on an ASR-10 for Cyhi the Prynce. Once West started working on Bully, engineer John Scott was asked by Schuback to come to Tokyo and work on the album, of which the latter contributed additional bass guitar to three of its tracks.

=== 2025–2026 ===
In 2025, during Bully's production West entered a manic episode, made antisemitic, pro-Nazi, and racist remarks, and began working on the unreleased album Cuck with the American rapper Dave Blunts as its songwriter. Some Cuck contributors, such as Blunts' producer Sheffmade, went on to work extensively on Bully. "All the Love", co-produced by Sheffmade, was recorded as an eight-minute freestyle and developed as "Gas Chambers" during the Cuck sessions before it was moved to Bully. Most work on Cuck had ceased by September 2025, when Blunts cut ties with West and alleged that he was "groomed" into writing it.

At some point into Bully's production, West's camp of contributors was "short-staffed", so he invited the Vultures 1 collaborator Adegboyega Ikwue (stage name Adey) to help with engineering. Ikwue began collaborating with West's cousin, the American singer the Wrldfms Tony Williams, co-writing and producing music alongside him. They wrote the deluxe version track "Mission Control" together, which caught West's attention; Ikwue later reflected that West "would come in and sit with you and check in and make sure you're doing what he wants you to be doing. He knows music so well that he can take apart a song in the most ridiculous way possible." According to Rolling Stone, West finished recording Bully before his Wall Street Journal apology for antisemitic statements in January 2026.

== Bully V1 ==
Bully V1
- Wordmark shown at the end of the film
- Directed by: Kanye West
- Starring: Saint West; Yoh; Toru Yano; Tiger Mask; El Desperado
- Edited by: Hype Williams
- Music by: Kanye West
- Release date: March 18, 2025
- Running time: 23 minutes (screening); 29 minutes (first cut); 45 minutes (second cut)
- Country: United States
- Language: English

Bully V1 is an early version of Bully, which was announced through West's X account and exclusively released through YouTube and Apple Music on March 18, 2025. Bully V1 is accompanied by a black-and-white short film of the same name, directed by West and edited by Hype Williams. It contains nine or ten songs, depending on the version, with different track listings for each release. The film opens with "Preacher Man" regardless of version, while the "post Hype version" features "Circles" and "Bully" as the fourth and fifth tracks, respectively. Other songs include "Highs and Lows" and "Last Breath". "Melrose", featuring West's frequent collaborators Playboi Carti and Ty Dolla Sign, is the tenth and final track on the version West released on X but is absent from the YouTube upload.

=== Short film ===
The film stars Kanye's son Saint West, who stands in a wrestling ring wielding a toy mallet and fends off aggressors portrayed by Japanese professional wrestlers Yoh, Toru Yano, Tiger Mask, and El Desperado. The album plays over the footage, the first cut of which lasts for 29 minutes; a later cut runs for 45 minutes. According to Rolling Stone's Jayson Buford, Saint represents Kanye, "who envisions himself as a martyr being attacked by all sides". However, the film's tone is comedic, with GQ's Paul Thompson writing that the visuals feature "a playfulness [and] generosity" reflected in the music.

=== Composition ===
"White Lines" (Bully V1)
Bully V1 features several interpolations, samples, and AI-generated vocals, such as on "White Lines", which interpolates "(They Long to Be) Close to You".

Billboard's Gil Kaufman writes that sonically, Bully V1 resembled West's "most experimental, creatively lauded period" from the late 2000s, specifically 808s & Heartbreak (2008) and My Beautiful Dark Twisted Fantasy (2010). Kaufman described the songs as "spare, soul-flecked compositions", featuring West crooning with vocals processed through Auto-Tune. The full album incorporates pitched up soul samples and elements of industrial music.

On Bully V1, West mostly sings instead of rapping, and according to him, half of his vocals are AI-generated deepfakes. Thompson writes that West's use of AI is not immediately obvious, since "[his] vocals for the most part function as texture rather than the songs' engine". He said it becomes clear about halfway through the album due to the vocals' resemblance to those in 808s & Heartbreak. Along with the vocals, Bully also employs AI software in its production. In his February 2025 interview with Justin LaBoy, West championed the benefits of AI stem separation, explaining that it can separate the vocals, bassline, or drums from any song. When West sends a song or sample to his engineers, he replies with, for example, "[John Scott], AI". West had previously used AI separation technology on the Stem Player, his collaboration with Kano Computing.

As with West's early work, Bully V1 relies heavily on sampling. Recordings such as "A Change Is Gonna Come" (1964) by Sam Cooke, "You Can't Hurry Love" (1966) by the Supremes, "(They Long to Be) Close to You" (1970) by Burt Bacharach and Hal David, "Huit Octobre 1971" (1975) by Cortex, "Bésame Mamá" (1996) by Poncho Sanchez, and "Soleil Soleil" (2020) by Pomme are sampled or interpolated. "Losing Your Mind", a track from the physical version of the album, features an artificial intelligence deepfake cover of the Can song "Vitamin C" (1972), while "Bully" samples The Simpsons character Nelson Muntz's "Ha-ha!" catchphrase. MusicTech and Variety noted that many of these appeared to be uncleared. Pomme had previously denied West permission to sample "Soleil Soleil", citing disagreements with his political views at the time, and the sample ended up not being used in the final version.

=== Critical reception ===
Bully V1 was met with overall positive reviews from music critics. Billboard's Michael Saponara found that those willing to overlook West's behavior enjoyed Bully V1 and praised it as evocative of his 2000s work, such as 808s & Heartbreak. Thompson described the demo as not just his best collection of beats in more than a decade, but provides a "rich, warm, and optimistic record" in a way that feels secluded from the internet, world, and even himself. Thompson favorably compared its production to West's singles "Only One" (2014) and "FourFiveSeconds" (2015). Frazier Tharpe of GQ called the production "very good" while discussing the rumored 2025 Jay-Z album. The Breakfast Club's Nyla Symone said she liked the Bully V1 songs she had listened to, adding that while she doubted West could make a comeback, "as far as being excellent at his craft, he's never swayed from that".

Jayson Buford of Rolling Stone described Bully V1 as West's best album since The Life of Pablo (2016), "show[ing] glimmers of the artist he once was". He felt it indicated that West was still capable of quality work but also found it his first boring album and not good enough to restore his reputation. In particular, he found the track "Bully" to suffer from "nonsensical" lyricism. Billboard's Kyle Dennis criticized Bully V1's curation and sequencing, saying of West's albums, "I haven't had a favorable listening experience top-to-bottom in quite some time".

== Composition ==
=== Overview ===
Bully revolves around old samples, industrial-based production, and beats reminiscent of West's earlier work, including "808s-style Auto-Tune wobbling" and "abrasive metallic beats" similar to Yeezus (2013). Eddy Lamarre of Rolling Out considered it to be a mixture of Yeezus, The Life of Pablo (2016), and Jesus Is King (2019), featuring spiritual undertones as well as hard synths and industrial drums.

Compared to the short nature of Bully V1 and the physical release, which lasts about 30 minutes, the digital release of Bully contains eighteen tracks in a running time of around 42 minutes with much of West's artificial intelligence-generated audio deepfakes replaced with his recorded vocals. The majority of the tracks are usually short, ending around the two-minute mark. Lyrically, the album centers on grief, isolation, ego, detachment, and emotional fatigue. West expresses vulnerability on tracks including "Mama's Favorite" and "Preacher Man", as well as addressing controversies surrounding him in several tracks throughout the album.

=== Tracks 1–9 ===
"King"
"King" features a repeat of a Duke Edwards sample as West reflects on his past controversies and public hatred.

"All the Love"
"All the Love" mixes synth-based production with West's melodic vocals, followed by André Troutman's vocals through a talk box.

"King" opens Bully with a sample of "Man: Don’t Cry Baby – Why? – Reach for a Star" by Duke Edwards and the Youngones, in which Edwards proclaims that "now is the time, for nature and all her glory have named you her king", as the sample remains present throughout the song. West reflects on his past controversies, rapping that although outside hatred only gave him "more love", his friends became "lost ones" who treated him like an orphan. West tries to explain himself and face reality, acknowledging that said controversies have changed his legacy. Transitioning to the rage-based "This a Must", rapper Nine Vicious provides ad-libs while West recalls his earlier moments of seeking global stardom with Graduation (2007). Some fans noted its similarity to West's unreleased track "Unlock", which was recorded with Ty Dolla Sign during the Vultures 1 sessions.

"Father" begins with angelic church organs and a vocal sample from gospel singer Johnnie Frierson. The song blends a gospel influence with "hard-hitting momentum" that relies on "heavy synth bass" and industrial drums. West raps about humility through leaving his old self behind and describing his new sense of self. Travis Scott makes an appearance on the song's second verse with "a faster flow and a more clear vocal tone" while giving a shoutout to Nike, as well as recounting his upbringing from rough neighborhoods to the riches of Malibu. Featuring a stretched vocal sample of Fairuz's "Fayek Alaya", "All the Love" features a "gospel-inflected" approach consisting of synths, tribal drums, and a wailing melody. André Troutman provides additional vocals as he sings through a talk box, while West performs melodically.

"Punch Drunk" and "Whatever Works" carry production and sampling techniques similar to West's earlier soul-based sound. The former uses a chipmunk soul-esque beat, while the latter uses a chopped Cissy Houston sample as West references his Wall Street apology within a ten-bar verse. "Mama's Favorite" reflects as a tribute to West's late mother Donda, similar to "Family Business" (2004) and "Hey Mama" (2005). The song also samples a snippet of dialogue between West and Donda from the documentary Jeen-Yuhs (2022). "Sisters and Brothers" uses elements of fuzzy distortion and stripped-down drums to emphasize a gloomy tone. West raps about how the public thinks he's "blacking out like Akon" and forgetting his status in hip-hop, as well as considering money to be "the root of all evil." "Bully" gives a more reflective state for West, addressing his public controversies and personal flaws as CeeLo Green "howls over a dramatic, string-packed chorus."

=== Tracks 10–18 ===
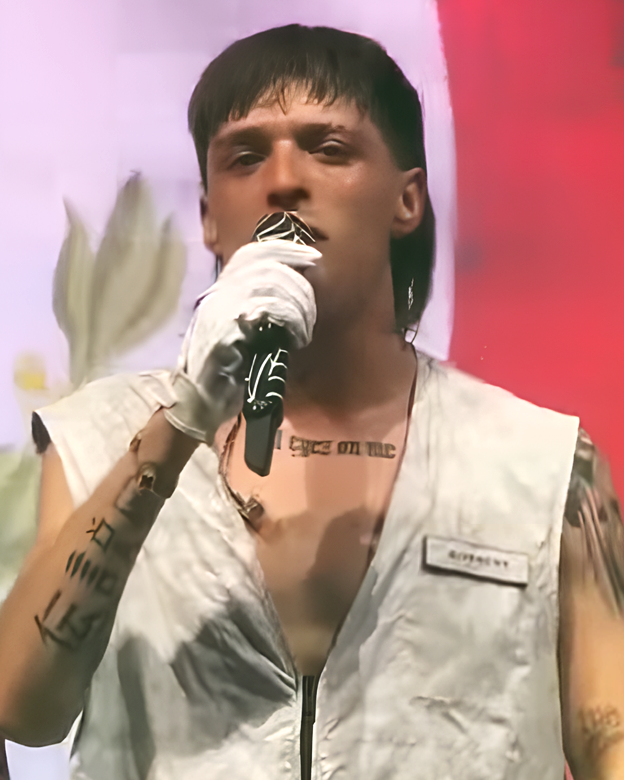
"Last Breath", a track blending Spanish and English lyrics, features Peso Pluma's interpolation of Poncho Sánchez's "Bésame Mamá" (1996).

"Highs and Lows" shows West's emotional dedication to his loved ones who stood by him in the midst of his controversies. "I Can't Wait" blends a Supremes sample with a "melancholic soundscape" as West balances intensity with clarity. The track is described as a "focused, soulful composition that feels nostalgic and revitalized". "White Lines" highlights West's reflection on the peacefulness of being alone at times as Troutman provides background vocals.

"Circles" is based around the sampling of Cortex's "Huit Octobre 1971" (1975), recognized as a notable sample used by other hip-hop artists including MF Doom and Tyler, the Creator. The song initially featured vocals from Don Toliver before being replaced by West's several days after the album's release. "Preacher Man" features minimalist production with an edited sample of "To You With Love" by the Moments. In its lyrics, West criticizes those who oppose him in a sneering, defiant tone, including people whom he perceives to have betrayed or extorted him.

"Beauty and the Beast" takes a downtempo approach with a sample of "Don't Have to Shop Around" by the Mad Lads featured prominently. Lyrically, West reflects on his status and career through the line "Fresh new tires, I'm still running / It's a few things I'm overcoming", and acknowledges his fans' expectations for him and his music. "Damn" emphasizes stripped-down production as West sings about "enjoying the ride in front of you, while not worrying about the possibility of crashing", referencing his car accident in 2002.

"Last Breath" blends Spanish and English lyrics from West with salsa loops and Mexican singer Peso Pluma's interpolation of Poncho Sánchez's "Bésame Mamá" (1996). Lyrically, the track explores themes of heartbreak, a trope popular with Mexican music. "This One Here", initially conceived with James Blake during sessions for War in 2022, is described by Michael Saponara of Billboard as a "healing album finisher to close the hook on Bully". During the track, West sings "I know dawn is upon us" in a way that sounds like Donda, before withholding his ego.

== Promotion and release ==
=== October 2024–March 2025: Announcement and Bully V1 ===
On October 25, 2024, West made Bully available for pre-order on his website, Yeezy, in vinyl and CD formats, alongside a Bully-themed merchandise collection, including t-shirts with the album cover on the front, an image from the short film, and a cap with "Bully" written in Japanese. He previewed new songs while DJing at the 1 Oak club in Tokyo on January 19, 2025, with two being remixes of Future's "Lil Demon" and "Magic Don Juan" (2024) and another being an untitled track. After appearing with his wife Bianca Censori at the 67th Annual Grammy Awards on February 3, West played more songs at the event's after party, including one with a chorus from his daughter, North.

In a February 2025 interview with Justin LaBoy, West said Bully would feature AI vocals. To demonstrate its capabilities, he ran Lil RT's debut single "60 Miles" through a voice model meant to mimic himself, which Lil RT's mother approved of despite never being informed beforehand that West would use her son's vocals. West's choice to use AI was criticized, which he responded to by comparing it to Auto-Tune, a technology that faced similar backlash before becoming widely accepted in music. He said Bully was scheduled for release on June 15, coinciding with North's birthday. On February 9, he released "Beauty and the Beast" on his website. On March 20, West said that "Melrose", a song featuring Playboi Carti and Ty Dolla Sign from the preview tracklist, would not be on the album. He replied to a fan that he would turn it into a solo song.

West initially announced a release date of June 15, coinciding with the twelfth birthday of North. Three early versions of the record were surprise released, each with different track listings, on March 18, via his X account. They were hosted through the website Frame.io. West stated the album was a work in progress and expressed regret for using AI, saying he had grown to hate it. West intended to work on the album further, as well as re-record the lyrics with his own vocals, adding that he may not release it on digital streaming platforms because of his belief that "streams are fake and the French and Jewish record labels treat artists like prostitutes".

West released a "screening version", a "post Hype version", and a "post post [sic] Hype version". On March 22, West published the screening version, dated December 2024, on YouTube. Media publications noted track list differences across the versions. The screening version does not feature "Melrose", which is the last song on others. The YouTube and Apple Music releases were taken down shortly after being uploaded without explanation.

=== May 2025–March 2026: Promotional singles and delays ===
Despite the March video release, West reaffirmed during a recorded meeting with streamer Sneako on May 24, 2025, that Bully was set to have a full release on June 15. West acknowledged his original pre-order for the album, saying that "We sold vinyl, though. We just haven't made them yet. That shit is like, 30,000 units or something like that". He spent much of the meeting discussing how artists are exploited by the music industry, encouraging them to fight back. On June 16, five tracks intended to feature on Bully were uploaded to the ISRC website under the artist names "Ye" and "Kanye West", being the songs "Highs and Lows", "Beauty and the Beast", "Preacher Man", "Damn", and "White Lines". Afterwards, West allegedly told the fan account YeFanatics that he planned to release the album in sets of five songs. The DMs posted by the account implied that five songs would be released that day, and another five the following day.

On June 20, West released "Preacher Man", "Beauty and the Beast", and "Damn" as promotional singles to streaming platforms as a 3-track Bully EP. On June 27, West uploaded a second EP to streaming services, containing the promotional singles "Last Breath" and "Losing Your Mind". West held a concert in Shanghai, China on July 12 in support of Bully, performing the previously released promotional singles alongside older songs from his discography. After being scheduled for release on July 25, Bully was delayed to be released on September 26 a week prior to its intended release, which was once again missed. On January 3, 2026, the Yeezy website was updated with preorder options for the album including multi-colored vinyl, CD, cassette, and bundles; the cassette and CD images contained the track listing. On January 28, West announced a release date of March 20, coinciding with a deal with the American media company Gamma to distribute the album. On January 30, West held a concert in Mexico City, Mexico. This was West's first appearance in the country in nearly twenty years since the Glow in the Dark Tour in 2008.

=== January–April 2026: Rollout and release ===
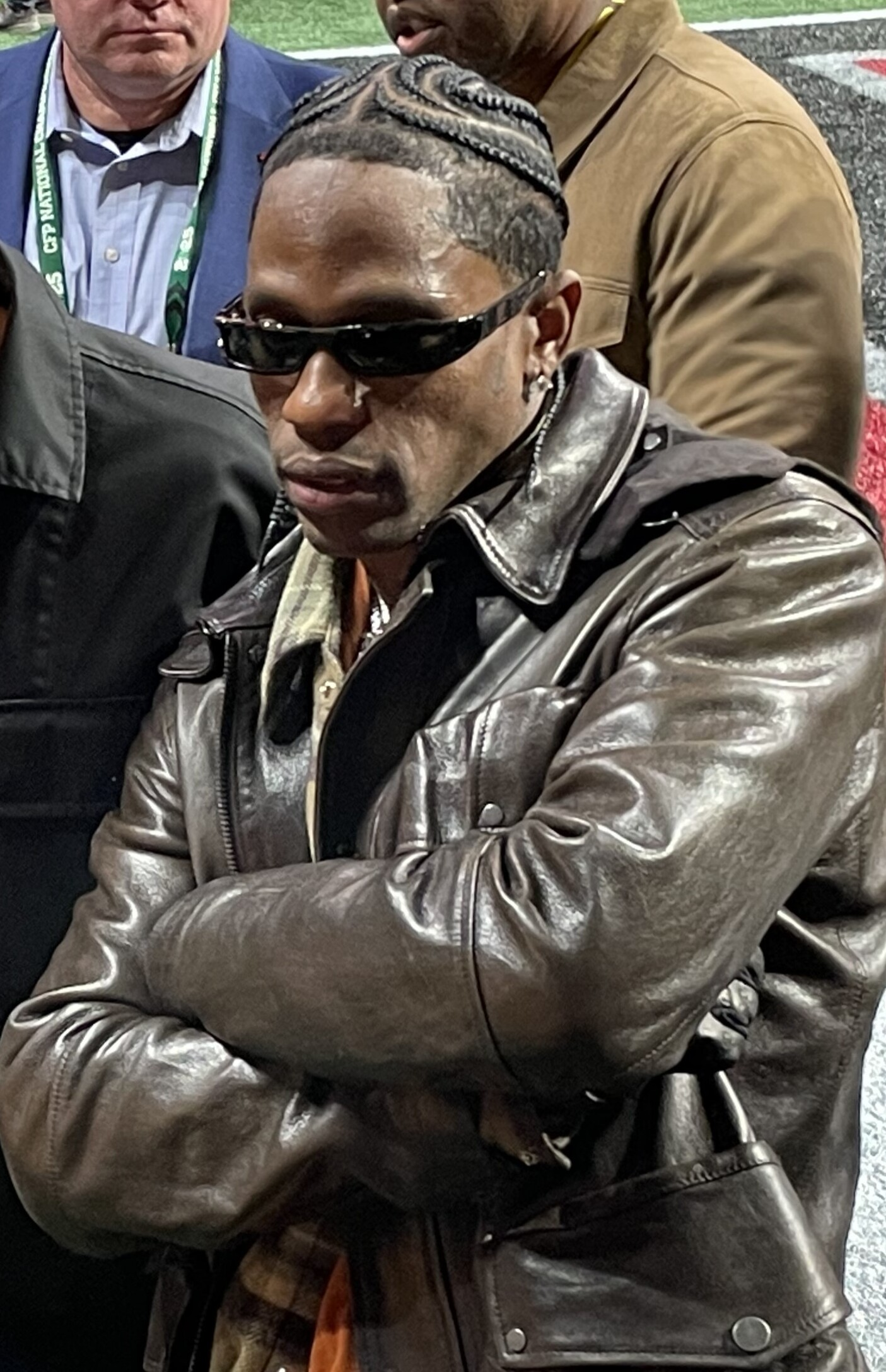
Travis Scott attended the album's listening party and appeared on the music video for "Father".

On March 10, billboards promoting the album debuted around the US, confirming the release date to be March 27. On March 24, a vinyl rip of Bully leaked online, still containing AI vocals. Following negative reception from fans, West affiliate Joseph Karre defended the album, stating that the timeline will look "a lot different on Friday". The same day, West posted a new tracklist for the album, promising it would feature "no AI". It featured six additional tracks, with "Highs and Lows" and "Mission Control" later being appended for a total of eight new tracks. Around the same time, a Beats Electronics ad featuring Travis Scott from December 2025 resurfaced online. During the last seconds of the ad, a snippet of "Father", a newly added track, plays in the background.

On March 26, West premiered Bully at a listening party at WePlay studios in Inglewood. A livestream of the album's listening party premiered through YouTube an hour after midnight, featuring Travis Scott, André Troutman, CeeLo Green, and Nine Vicious as guests. West also hosted a professional wrestling exhibition during the listening party, involving independent wrestlers including A.M.B., Terry Yaki, and Jay Lucas, which took place in Atlanta. Hours after its release, West removed the livestream from public view on YouTube.

On March 28, a day after its intended release, the album was made available on streaming services with eighteen tracks, omitting "Mission Control" and "Outside". The music video for "Father", a collaboration with Travis Scott, was released alongside the album's release on March 28. The video depicts a church setting inhabited by aliens and knights, where West sits lifelessly in a congregation while Michael Jackson impersonator Fabio Jackson appears in the background. Later in the video, West's mask is removed to reveal him as an alien and he is taken away.

The English musician James Blake received a production credit upon the album's release for his work on "This One Here", which stems from an unreleased collaborative album between him and West named War from 2022. Blake later released a statement asking for his credit to be removed, stating that while his structural and pitching contributions remained, he felt the released song deviated too much from his initial version and did not want credit for someone else's work. On April 2, West updated "Circles" by replacing Don Toliver's vocals with his own.

=== April–August 2026: Deluxe release ===
At an after-party of West's second performance at SoFi Stadium on April 3, the track "OK" featuring Don Toliver was previewed. On April 5, Gamma officially confirmed that a deluxe version was "on the way" in an Instagram story post which boasted the album's commercial performance. On June 8, after his performance in the Netherlands, West released a single titled "Gemini Season"; the description of the song's music video confirmed that a deluxe of Bully would release on June 19. On June 19, the deluxe was released with "OK" and "Mission Control", as well as a new version of "I Can't Wait" featuring rapper and singer Lauryn Hill performing the chorus. All tracks on the deluxe have updated mixing and mastering done by Irko, with small tweaks having been made to the mixes.

West released the music video for "King" shortly after the album's deluxe release. The music video depicts him driving various passengers in a convertible down a dusty road with a mountainside backdrop. The convertible is followed closely by a police car that flashes its lights as West drives slowly and for the video's conclusion, he forces the brakes on then launches outwards into an electric chair where two officers crown his head with an electrode. On August 17, West released the music video for "OK", which features Don Toliver and was directed by Censori. The music video depicts an operating room with doctors treating a decapitated West, reattaching his body to bring him back to life.

== Tour ==
A wide shot of the spherical main stage for Ye Live Concert Tour; photograph taken at Raymond James Stadium, Tampa, in June 2026.

West performing at Gelora Bung Karno Stadium, Jakarta, in October 2026.

On March 9, West announced a one-night concert at SoFi Stadium in Inglewood, California, scheduled for April 3, with tickets going on sale on March 11. This marked West's first performance in the city since 2021. With over one million people applying in its pre-sale queue, he announced another concert scheduled for April 1, with tickets going on sale on March 13. People ordering pre-sale for tickets were required to pre-save Bully and that "a few lucky pre-registrants will be selected to receive free tickets". West performed songs from across his career for the concert at SoFi Stadium, opening with Bully tracks "King", "This a Must", "Father", and "All the Love". He missed lines from these tracks during this opener, doing this again when performing the same tracks later on. The two shows grossed $33 million in ticket sales.

The May 30 concert that took place in Istanbul, Turkey, sold 118,000 tickets, making it the largest single show attendance for a West concert; West later claimed the show broke the all-time record for the largest stadium performance. West's Alamodome concert on July 4, which grossed around $9 million, was noted for providing an economic boost to local hotels in San Antonio, with reservations in the area increasing by 22 percent. Multiple controversies surrounding West's concerts have occurred, including scrutiny from politicians and Jewish organizations in the Netherlands, Florida senator Rick Scott urging the Tampa Sports Authority to cancel West's shows in the city, and Gina Ortiz Jones, the mayor of San Antonio, expressing support for the cancellation of his concert in the city.

On September 3 and 4, West held two concerts at Soldier Field in Chicago, which were estimated to have drawn over 142,000 attendees. The two concerts were notable for featuring a significant number of music artists who have collaborated with West, including Big Sean, 2 Chainz, Rick Ross, Cyhi the Prynce, Twista, Lupe Fiasco, Chief Keef, Common, Consequence, GLC, Really Doe, Future, Travis Scott, Young Thug, and Don Toliver. Lastly, Kid Cudi reunited with West following a strained period in their relationship. Cudi called West his 'brother' on X following the show and defended him from critics on their reunion. The performances received acclaim, as Will Lavin of Complex described the second night as a "G.O.O.D. Music Reunion", while Peony Hirwani of Rolling Stone reflected it as representing West's complicated legacy.

West held a concert in Jakarta at Gelora Bung Karno Stadium on October 24, which sold 70,000 tickets with a gross of $18 million. Berita Jakarta reported that the concert along with the Jakarta Running Festival significantly benefited the city's economy. On October 31, West held a concert in Houston at Reliant Stadium, which featured surprise appearances from Playboi Carti and North West. The concert sold 80,210 tickets, breaking the record for the biggest U.S. stadium hip-hop concert attendance. On November 1, Texas state representative Ron Reynolds presented West the "Global Icon Award" for breaking the attendance record, which received controversy due to the latter's past controversies. On November 7, West held a concert in Dallas at AT&T Stadium, which again broke the record for the most-attended rap concert, having sold 83,132 tickets and grossed more than $18 million. It was also considered the fifth highest-grossing concert in the U.S. The concert featured surprise appearances from Erykah Badu and Kid Cudi.

=== Canceled performances ===
There were multiple instances of concerts being canceled due to security concerns and public backlash. West scheduled a concert at the Jawaharlal Nehru Stadium in New Delhi, India for the tour on May 23, 2026, which was set to be his first concert in the country until it was canceled eight days in advance due to security concerns. West was scheduled to headline Wireless Festival in Finsbury Park, London, from July 10-12; on April 7, after former Prime Minister Keir Starmer, along with other British politicians, condemned West's planned appearances, the Home Office announced that he was blocked from visiting the United Kingdom. After main sponsors Pepsi and Diageo pulled out due to concerns over West's controversial past statements, Wireless Festival, despite releasing a statement saying they would defend their choice for him to headline, later announced the cancellation of the entire event for 2026.

The June 11 concert in Marseille, June 19 concert in Chorzów, and July 18 concert in Reggio Emilia were all canceled, while the July 25 concert in Prague was canceled after the venue prematurely ended its agreement to host West following public and political pressure. West's planned but then-unannounced June concert at St. Jakob Park in Basel was blocked by venue owners FC Basel, citing the club's "values". In addition, two concerts in Saint Petersburg were planned for October 10 and 11, but canceled because no agreement was signed. Ahead of West's concert in Houston on October 31, Reliant Stadium released a statement that face masks, face paint, and hate symbols were prohibited.

== Artwork and title ==
On October 23, 2024, West posted Bully's cover, shot by the Japanese photographer Daidō Moriyama, on Instagram. It features a black-and-white image of Saint wearing titanium grills, similar to those that Kanye wore at the time. Kanye later revealed that the title Bully was a reference to Saint, who he observed kicking a child for being "weak". Speaking on the photo shoot process, grills designer Omar Alvarado described the "intensity" as "unforgettable": "Nearly everything that could go wrong did, which made the manufacturing process a real test of skill and resilience. But seeing the team and I overcome every obstacle to deliver was an amazing feeling."

On June 19, 2026, West posted an image on his X and Instagram accounts, with the caption "New cover". This was later used on digital releases of the deluxe version of Bully. The cover was shot in a similar style to the original, a black-and-white photograph showing Saint, wearing metallic reflective grills.

== Reception ==
=== Critical reception ===
Professional ratings
Aggregate scores
Source	Rating
Metacritic	55/100
Review scores
Source	Rating
AllMusic	4/5 stars
Financial Times	2/5 stars
Hot Press	8/10
HotNewHipHop	(Note: HotNewHipHop specifically gave Bully a "Meh" rating, which is equivalent to a 3/5 rating.)
Pitchfork	3.4/10
Rolling Out	4.5/5 stars
Rolling Stone	2.5/5 stars
Slant Magazine	2.5/5 stars

The album's full release polarized music critics. According to the review aggregator Metacritic, Bully received "mixed or average reviews" based on a weighted average score of 55 out of 100 from 4 critic scores. Vice described it as his "most coherent, satisfying project in years". Eddy "Precise" Lamarre of Rolling Out gave the album a highly positive review, describing it as a reset for West's career. Similarly, Esquire's Rudra Mulmule viewed the album as "surprisingly restrained" in controversy, noting the "tension between chaos and introspection". Peter McGoran of Hot Press gave a positive review at the album's listening party, calling the album West's "first good album in 10 years". McGoran praised its reflective nature, describing its sound as "a return to the old Kanye". Uranium Waves characterized the album as "not a triumphant reinvention, but it is a more disciplined and musically engaging album than many expected", crediting its soundscapes. Saeed Saeed of The National shared a close stance, listing it as West's seventh-best solo album, emphasizing its production, momentum, and focus while noting on its unfinished elements.

In a mixed review, Preezy Brown of Rolling Stone highlighted several tracks as standouts, commending "Sisters and Brothers", "Father", "King", "Preacher Man", "All the Love", and "I Can't Wait" as the album's six best songs, describing the release as a "highly anticipated return". However, he otherwise described the album as "lifeless overall", with "clean, easily traceable" lyrics. Similarly, Jeff Ihaza from the same magazine praised the album's music as "easily some of the best-sounding Kanye has made in years", while criticizing it as emotionally empty. Ihaza singled out several tracks, further describing the album's overall sound as "like decades of his music fed into a computer program". Edward Bowser of Soul in Stereo gave the album a mixed-positive review, complimenting its production as West's best in years while questioning its lyrics. Peter A. Berry of Complex criticized the album as a "spacey cloud of glossy hollowness", writing that it imitates older works from West, while noting the album's "mild traces of Yeezy greatness". In a review by Pitchfork, Kieran Press-Reynolds rated the album a 3.4/10, describing it as underwritten, "a cheap hit of retro-Kanye", and criticizing the album's mixing. Similarly, Ludovic Hunter-Tilney of the Financial Times gave the album a negative review, framing criticism in relation to West's public apology in January 2026.

=== Commercial performance ===
Bully was a commercial success, debuting at number two on the US Billboard 200 behind BTS's Arirang for the week of April 2, 2026, becoming West's 14th top-10 record on the chart. It recorded 152,000 album-equivalent units, consisting of 96,000 streaming units equivalent to 98.43 million on-demand streams and 56,000 album sales. This figure was disputed by Gamma, which claimed the album actually moved 201,000 album-equivalent units in the first full week as a result of releasing on a Saturday. It debuted atop the US Top R&B/Hip-Hop Albums chart, becoming West's 13th number-one on the chart. Bully also topped the Independent Albums, Top Streaming Albums, and Top Rap Albums charts. Upon release, 16 of the album's 18 tracks charted on the Billboard Hot 100, with "Father" reaching the highest position at number 21. In the following week, Bully fell to number three on the Billboard 200, earning 69,000 album-equivalent units.

Within the United Kingdom, Bully opened at number three on the main UK Albums Chart, number two on R&B Albums, and number eight on Independent Albums. In Japan, the album appeared in four of its charts, peaking at number three on Dance & Soul Albums, number 16 on Western Albums, number 33 on Combined Albums, and number eight on Hot Albums charts. In Australia, the album debuted at number three on the Albums chart and topped the Hip-Hop/R&B Albums chart. In Canada, the album debuted at number two on the Canadian Albums Chart, with 15 of the album's tracks debuting on the Canadian Hot 100. Elsewhere, Bully debuted at number two in the Czech Republic, Denmark, Lithuania, Portugal, and Poland; number three in Hungary, Ireland, the Netherlands, New Zealand, Norway, Slovakia, Sweden, and Switzerland; and number four in Austria and Flanders. The album also debuted inside the top ten in Germany, Italy, and Spain, as well as the top twenty in Wallonia, Finland, France, and Scotland.

=== Accolades ===
On November 16, 2026, the deluxe version of Bully was nominated for Best Rap Album at the 69th Annual Grammy Awards, which is set to take place on February 7, 2027. Despite the album's controversies over its use of artificial intelligence, the Recording Academy states that artists are allowed to incorporate it as long as the "human authorship element is 'meaningful' and 'relevant to the category.'" The announcement of the album's nomination received backlash on social media due to West's past controversies, with one considering it to be "embarrassing."

Accolades for Bully - Deluxe
Organization	Year	Category	Result	Ref.
Grammy Awards	2027	Best Rap Album	Pending	

== Track listing ==
Track listing and credits are adapted from Spotify, with additional credits taken from the BMI Repertoire, (Note: Credits on the BMI Repertoire can be viewed by searching a song's work number. The following songs have additional credits adapted from the BMI Repertoire: "All the Love" (BMI #81701167); "Punch Drunk" (BMI #81668692); "White Lines" (BMI #78864109)) the Mechanical Licensing Collective, (Note: Credits on the Mechanical Licensing Collective (MLC) can be viewed by searching a song's code. The following songs have additional credits adapted from the MLC: "King" (MLC #KM8LUO and #KS62T2); "Father" (MLC #FC9GPO); "Whatever Works" (MLC #W29BXB); "Sisters and Brothers" (MLC #S133IG); "Preacher Man" (MLC #P937SG); "Losing Your Mind" (MLC #LVA6B0)) and Billboard.

Standard edition
No.	Title	Writer(s)	Producer(s)	Length
1.	"King"	Ye; Samuel Lindley; Che Pope; Justino Macosso; Quentin Miller; James Price; André Troutman; Brian Hodgson; Delia Derbyshire; Don Harper	Ye; the Legendary Traxster; 2 Vicious^{[c]}; Sheffmade^{[c]}; Troutman^{[c]}	2:06
2.	"This a Must"	Ye; Trevon Echols; Miller; Price	Ye; Sheffmade	1:26
3.	"Father" (featuring Travis Scott)	Ye; Jacques Webster; Che Smith; Troutman; Jahaan Sweet; Pope	Ye; Travis Scott; Sweet; 2 Vicious^{[c]}; Troutman^{[c]}; Sheffmade^{[a]}	2:49
4.	"All the Love" (featuring André Troutman)	Ye; Troutman; Charles Njapa; Price; Blair Reese; Rashon Murph; Assi Rahbani; Mansour Rahbani; Tahj "Rasta" Clarke	Ye; Sheffmade; Quadwoofer; RaMu; Troutman; 2 Vicious^{[c]}	3:49
5.	"Punch Drunk"	Ye; Miller; Price; Jack Cohen-Mungan; Elbernita "Twinkie" Clark	Ye; Sheffmade; Audio Jacc	1:48
6.	"Whatever Works"	Ye; Miller; Price; Raúl Bermejo; Nkenge Kamau; François Beaune	Ye; Sheffmade; Jambo; Nkenge 1x	1:59
7.	"Mama's Favorite" (featuring Nine Vicious)	Ye; Echols; Miller; Kamau; Cole McEvoy-Morie; Troutman; Pope; Macosso	Ye; RaMu; Nkenge 1x; 2 Vicious^{[c]}; Troutman^{[c]}; McEvoy^{[c]}	2:34
8.	"Sisters and Brothers"	Ye; Miller; Echols; Price; Liston Gregory III; Pope; Troutman; Kamau; Dean Durkin; Jonah Thompson; Charlie Babie; Dan Hartman; Junior Vasquez	Ye; Sheffmade; Gregory; Nkenge 1x; 88-Keys; 2 Vicious^{[c]}; Troutman^{[c]}; Durkin^{[c]}	2:46
9.	"Bully" (featuring CeeLo Green)	Ye; Thomas Callaway; Billy Walsh; Tyrone Griffin Jr.; Michael Akinlosotu; Lindley	Ye; the Legendary Traxster; 88-Keys; TK the Legend^{[c]}; CeeLo Green^{[v]}	2:27
10.	"Highs and Lows"	Ye; Griffin; Lindley; Miller; Kamau	Ye; the Legendary Traxster; Nkenge 1x; RaMu; Troutman^{[c]}; TK the Legend^{[c]}	1:51
11.	"I Can't Wait"	Ye; Caleb Toliver; Walsh; Miller; Michael Humphries; Brian Holland; Lamont Dozier; Eddie Holland	Ye; RaMu; Troutman^{[c]}; the Wrldfms Tony Williams^{[v]}	2:07
12.	"White Lines" (featuring André Troutman)	Ye; Toliver; Walsh; John Scott; Josh Schuback; Kamau; Cashmere Small	Ye	2:10
13.	"Circles"	Ye; Walsh; Njapa; Kamau	Ye; 88-Keys; Nkenge 1x	1:31
14.	"Preacher Man"	Ye; Miller; Al Goodman; Sharon Seiger; Tyrone Johnson	Ye; 88-Keys^{[a]}	3:01
15.	"Beauty and the Beast"	Ye; Toliver	Ye; 88-Keys^{[a]}	1:45
16.	"Damn"	Ye; Hassan Khaffaf; Albert Daniels; Murph; Akinlosotu	Ye; Khaffaf^{[p]}; RaMu; Troutman; TK the Legend^{[c]}	2:02
17.	"Last Breath" (featuring Peso Pluma)	Ye; Hassan Laija; Griffin; Nakamura Takahiro; Rafael Bautista; Anthony Garcia; Price; Ramón Santamaría	Ye; Sheffmade; Ty Dolla Sign^{[v]}	3:06
18.	"This One Here"	Ye; Miller; Toliver; Kamau; Murph; Akinlosotu; Troutman; Mike Moore	Ye; RaMu; TK the Legend^{[c]}; Moore^{[c]}; Troutman^{[c]}; Miller^{[v]}; Toliver^{[v]}	3:01
Total length:				42:26

Digital deluxe edition
No.	Title	Writer(s)	Producer(s)	Length
11.	"I Can't Wait" (featuring Ms. Lauryn Hill)	Ye; Miller; Toliver; Walsh; Humphries; B. Holland; Dozier; E. Holland	Ye; RaMu; Troutman^{[c]}; Williams^{[v]}	2:17
19.	"OK" (featuring Don Toliver)	Ye; Miller; Toliver; Price; Aaron Cheung; Derek Anderson; Nico Baran	Ye; Sheffmade; Aaron Paris; 206Derek; Baran; Toliver^{[v]}	2:38
20.	"Mission Control" (featuring the Wrldfms Tony Williams)	Ye; Adegboyega Ikwue; Kamau; Williams	Ye; Ikwue; Nkenge 1x; Williams^{[v]}	1:52
Total length:				46:56

"First pressing" physical edition
No.	Title	Writer(s)	Producer(s)	Length
1.	"Preacher Man"	Ye; Miller; Goodman; Seiger; Johnson	Ye	3:00
2.	"Beauty and the Beast"	Ye; Toliver	Ye	1:47
3.	"Last Breath"	Ye; Griffin; Takahiro; Bautista; Santamaría	Ye; Ty Dolla Sign^{[v]}	2:20
4.	"White Lines"			2:09
5.	"I Can't Wait"			1:53
6.	"Bully"			2:15
7.	"All the Love"			2:26
8.	"This One Here"			3:04
9.	"Highs and Lows"			1:53
10.	"Mission Control"	Ye; Ikwue; Kamau; Williams	Ye; Ikwue; Nkenge 1x; Williams^{[v]}	1:52
11.	"Circles"			2:04
12.	"Damn"	Ye; Khaffaf	Ye; Khaffaf^{[p]}	2:03
13.	"Losing Your Mind"	Ye; Holger Schüring; Irmin Schmidt; Jaki Liebezeit; Kenji Suzuki; Michael Karoli; James Ho; Jaden Smith; Raury Tullis	Ye	3:26
Total length:				30:12

=== Notes ===
- ^{^[a]} indicates an additional producer.
- ^{^[c]} indicates a co-producer.
- ^{^[v]} indicates a vocal producer.
- ^{^[p]} indicates someone credited as both a primary and vocal producer (West is credited as both on all tracks).
- All track titles are stylized in all caps.
- Don Toliver's feature on "Circles" was replaced with West's vocals.
- James Blake was originally credited as a producer and songwriter on "This One Here", but was removed upon his request.
- Nine Vicious's feature on "Mama's Favorite" was originally uncredited on streaming services.
- The deluxe version of "Last Breath" is slightly shorter than the original version at 2:57.

==== Sample credits ====
- "King" contains a sample of "Man: Don’t Cry Baby – Why? – Reach for a Star", as performed by Duke Edwards and the Youngones.
- "Father" contains a sample of "Heavenly Father, You've Been Good", as performed by Johnnie Frierson.
- "All the Love" contains a sample of "Fayek Alaya", written by brothers Assi and Mansour Rahbani, as performed by Fairuz.
- "Punch Drunk" contains a sample of "I Can Do All Things Through Christ", as performed by the Clark Sisters.
- "Whatever Works" contains a sample of "Don't Wonder Why", as performed by Cissy Houston.
- "Mama's Favorite" contains an excerpt of a speech by Donda West from the documentary series Jeen-Yuhs.
- "Sisters and Brothers" contains a sample of "Get Involved", as written and performed by Jonah Thompson.
- "Preacher Man" contains a sample of "To You with Love", written by Al Goodman, Sharon Seiger, and Tyrone Johnson, as performed by the Moments.
- "White Lines" contains interpolations of "(They Long to Be) Close to You", written by Burt Bacharach and Hal David, as performed by Stevie Wonder.
- "Circles" contains interpolations of "Huit Octobre 1971", written by Alain Mion, as performed by Cortex.
- "Beauty and the Beast" contain a sample of "Don't Have to Shop Around", as performed by the Mad Lads.
- "Last Breath" contains elements of "Legado", written by Nakamura Takahiro; and "Bésame Mamá", written by Ramón Santamaría, as performed by Poncho Sanchez. (Note: The physical release featured a full sample; it was later resung by Peso Pluma for the streaming release.)
- "OK" contains an interpolation of "Put On", written by Jay Jenkins, West, and Christopher Gholson, as performed by Jeezy featuring West.
- "Losing Your Mind" contains an artificial intelligence interpolation of "Vitamin C", as performed by Can.

== Personnel ==
Credits are adapted from Spotify.

=== Musicians ===
- Ye – programming (all tracks); vocoder (12)
- Nine Vicious – additional vocals (2)
- Nkenge 1x – piano (6); additional vocals, keyboards (7); arrangement (8); percussion (10); bass guitar (10, "Losing Your Mind"); synthesizer (12–13, 20); programming ("Losing Your Mind")
- McEvoy – bass guitar, drums, percussion (7)
- The Legendary Traxster – piano (9–10); synthesizer (9)
- Mai Ohtani – violin, viola (9–10)
- Shin Fujii – electric guitar (9, 12); bass guitar (9)
- Teppei Kawakami – trumpet (9)
- Kanade Shishiuchi – trombone (9)
- Yuma Yamaguchi – piano (9)
- Masabumi Sekiguchi – cello (9)
- 1srael – background vocals (9); piano, bass guitar (11); effects (12); drums, guitar, programming ("Losing Your Mind")
- FutureSelf – background vocals (9, 11); guitar (11)
- Harmoni Mathis – background vocals (9)
- Layke Erie – background vocals (9)
- TK the Legend – background vocals (9, 16, 18)
- Jude Dontoh – background vocals (11)
- Brayla – background vocals (12–13)
- Takashi Fukuoka – percussion (12)
- Kyle Reith – vocoder (12)
- 88-Keys – drums (13)
- Jamil – bass guitar (13)
- John Scott – bass guitar (14–15, 17)
- Hassan Khaffaf – programming (16)
- Mike Moore – keytar (18)
- Adegboyega Ikwue – arrangement (20)
- Dane Burge – arrangement (20)
- Anthony Vincent Cappeto – guitar ("Losing Your Mind")
- Void Stryker – drums, guitar, programming ("Losing Your Mind")

=== Engineers ===
- Nkenge 1x – mastering (4, 6–15, 17–18, 20, "Losing Your Mind"); mixing (4, 6–13, 15, 17–18, 20, "Losing Your Mind"); recording (4, 6–13, 17–18, 20)
- TK the Legend – engineering (4, 7, 9, 18)
- John Scott – mixing, recording (9–15, 17–18, "Losing Your Mind"); mastering (14, 17)
- Josh Schuback – mixing, recording (9–15, 17–18, "Losing Your Mind"); mastering (14, 17)
- Julian Miller – recording (11)
- Dan Stringer – recording (11)
- Glen 'Divinci' Valencia Jr. – sound editor (11)
- The Legendary Traxster – mixing, recording (14–15, "Losing Your Mind")
- Hassan Khaffaf – mixing, mastering (16)
- Dane Burge – recording (20)
- Irko – mixing, mastering (1–20, digital deluxe)

== Charts ==
Chart performance for Bully
Chart (2026)	Peak position
Australian Albums (ARIA)	3
Australian Hip Hop/R&B Albums (ARIA)	1
Austrian Albums (Ö3 Austria)	4
Belgian Albums (Ultratop Flanders)	4
Belgian Albums (Ultratop Wallonia)	11
Canadian Albums (Billboard)	2
Croatian International Albums (HDU)	3
Czech Albums (ČNS IFPI)	2
Danish Albums (Hitlisten)	2
Dutch Albums (Album Top 100)	3
Finnish Albums (Suomen virallinen lista)	15
French Albums (SNEP)	15
German Albums (Offizielle Top 100)	9
German Albums (Top 20 Hip Hop)	1
Hungarian Albums (MAHASZ)	3
Irish Albums (Official Charts)	3
Irish Independent Albums (IRMA)	2
Italian Albums (FIMI)	7
Japanese Combined Albums (Oricon)	33
Japanese Dance & Soul Albums (Oricon)	3
Japanese Hot Albums (Billboard Japan)	8
Japanese Western Albums (Oricon)	16
Lithuanian Albums (AGATA)	2
New Zealand Albums (RMNZ)	3
Nigerian Albums (TurnTable)	39
Norwegian Albums (VG-lista)	3
Polish Albums (ZPAV)	2
Portuguese Albums (AFP)	2
Scottish Albums (Official Charts)	15
Slovak Albums (ČNS IFPI)	3
South Korean Retail Albums (Circle)	47
Spanish Albums (Promusicae)	8
Swedish Albums (Sverigetopplistan)	3
Swedish Hip-Hop Albums (Sverigetopplistan)	1
Swiss Albums (Schweizer Hitparade)	3
Swiss Hip-Hop Albums (Schweizer Hitparade)	1
UK Albums (Official Charts)	3
UK Independent Albums (Official Charts)	8
UK R&B Albums (Official Charts)	2
US Billboard 200	2
US Independent Albums (Billboard)	1
US Top R&B/Hip-Hop Albums (Billboard)	1

Chart performance for Bully - Deluxe
Chart (2026)	Peak position
Italian Albums (FIMI)	81
Lithuanian Albums (AGATA)	69
