= Beauty and the Beast (Kanye West song) =

2025 promotional single by Kanye West

Promotional single by Kanye West

from the album Bully
- Released: February 9, 2025
- Recorded: 2021; 2024–2026
- Genre: Downtempo
- Length: 1:45
- Label: YZY; Gamma
- Songwriters: Ye; Caleb Toliver
- Producer: Ye

"Beauty and the Beast" (stylized in all caps) is a song by American rapper Kanye West from his twelfth studio album, Bully (2026). It was released as a promotional single on February 9, 2025, exclusively through West's Yeezy website, and was later released to music streaming services along with "Preacher Man" and "Damn" on June 20, 2025, via a 3-track extended play (EP). Prior to its release, a visual preview was posted by West on Instagram in October 2024.

A downtempo song, it samples "Don't Have to Shop Around" by R&B vocal group the Mad Lads. West solely produced the track himself and wrote it alongside Don Toliver. Lyrically, "Beauty and the Beast" focuses on West's emotional state and place in the music industry, reflecting on how his career has changed.

West initially recorded "Beauty and the Beast" in 2021, later reworking the song in 2024 in his hotel room in Tokyo. It was previewed multiple times prior to its release, first being played at West and Ty Dolla Sign's September 2024 concert at the Wuyuan River Stadium in Haikou, China, where West first officially announced Bully. It was the second song previewed for the album, along with the track "Preacher Man". The song was later included as a track on West's March 2025 visual album Bully V1.

Following its debut at Haikou, "Beauty and the Beast" received positive reviews from music critics, who often praised its production and writing as more relaxed than West's recent releases. Commercially, the track appeared on the Billboard Hot 100, US Hot R&B/Hip-Hop Songs chart, Canadian Hot 100, and New Zealand Hot Singles chart.

== Background and recording ==
"Beauty and the Beast" was first played during Kanye West's September 28, 2024, show at Haikou's Wuyuan River Stadium, a destination on his and Ty Dolla Sign's Vultures 2 Listening Experience tour. This was the second time West had debuted a new song during the tour, as he had previously played the song "Preacher Man" (2025) at a September 15 concert. Towards the end of the song, West announced that he had "a new album coming out", revealing the album's title, Bully, and the song "Beauty and the Beast". He previewed an updated version in full via Instagram on October 16, alongside an accompanying visual from the Haikou show. According to the post's caption, West had made adjustments to the song since its debut while staying in Tokyo, Japan, recording it in his hotel room. Former collaborator and record producer Mike Dean later affirmed that the track was first conceived during sessions for West's tenth studio album, Donda (2021).

== Composition and lyrics ==
"Beauty and the Beast"
"Beauty and the Beast" is a downtempo song that shows West's reflective nature and sample-based production.

Musically, "Beauty and the Beast" is a downtempo song. Unlike most of West's work, his vocals are entirely sung rather than rapped. It was produced using the keyboard Ensoniq ASR-10 and the sampler machine SP-1200. It uses a prominent sample of "Don't Have to Shop Around" by R&B vocal group the Mad Lads. The sample-based production and used equipment led critics to draw comparisons to West's earlier work, with HotNewHipHop writer Zachary Horvath considering the song's production style to resemble a blend of West's prior albums The College Dropout (2004), 808s & Heartbreak (2008), My Beautiful Dark Twisted Fantasy (2010), and The Life of Pablo (2016).

Like the majority of Bully, West served as the primary producer of "Beauty and the Beast". Lyrically, West sings about having "fresh new tires" and admits his attempts to managing his emotions better, reflecting on his status and rekindled career following the Vultures albums. He acknowledges his fans' expectations for him and his music, singing on the song's chorus, "Think about it every night and day / To try to stay away, to keep my audience / So don't take this as disrespect, I'm sitting here tryna redirect."

The relaxed nature of "Beauty and the Beast" is reflective of West's time spent in Tokyo. Music journalist Touré, who was in correspondence with West, stated that his China tour dates were intentionally picked so he could retreat to Japan. Touré also claimed that West was producing the album "pretty much by himself", noting that his music was usually a combination of multiple people's input. He referred to it as a "fresh chapter" in West's life, "because in Tokyo he can be who he wants to be."

== Release and reception ==
"Beauty and the Beast" was released as a promotional single on West's Yeezy website on February 9, 2025, for streaming. As it was released during the Super Bowl LIX halftime show, publications saw it as a sign that West was jealous of halftime show performer and fellow rapper Kendrick Lamar. The song was removed from his website shortly after, as all items were replaced with a swastika T-shirt. It later appeared on the short film Bully V1. On June 20, 2025, West released a 3-track extended play (EP) as promotion for the album, including the song alongside the tracks "Preacher Man" and "Damn". Bully was released on March 28, 2026, through distribution from Gamma, which includes "Beauty and the Beast". The song was also provided with a different visual on West's YouTube channel.

"Beauty and the Beast" has received positive reviews. Commenting on its initial preview, iHeart Radio's Tony Centeno described West's vocals as "soothing" with an instrumental similar to his earlier works. Armon Sadler of Vibe felt the track's downtempo production was a departure from West's recent albums–Vultures 1 and 2 in particular–making it "the ideal canvas for [him] to be more vulnerable." Similarly, Complex's Miki Hellerbach noted its writing as "the most meditative we've heard [West's] lyrics in quite some time, as he ponders rather than asserts." As a promotional single, "Beauty and the Beast", peaked at number 19 on the New Zealand Hot Singles chart. Following the release of Bully, it peaked at number 85 on the Billboard Hot 100, number 23 on the Hot R&B/Hip-Hop Songs chart, and number 93 on the Canadian Hot 100.

== Personnel ==
Credits adapted from Tidal.

- Ye – programming, vocal production
- 88-Keys – additional production
- John Scott – bass guitar, recording, mixing, mastering
- Josh Schuback – recording, mixing, mastering
- Nkenge 1x – mixing, mastering
- The Legendary Traxster – recording, mixing

== Charts ==
Chart (2025–2026)	Peak position
Canada Hot 100 (Billboard)	93
New Zealand Hot Singles (RMNZ)	19
US Billboard Hot 100	85
US Hot R&B/Hip-Hop Songs (Billboard)	23
