= King (Kanye West song) =

- Wordmark displayed at the end of the music video

Song by Kanye West

from the album Bully
- Released: March 28, 2026
- Genre: Industrial hip-hop
- Length: 2:06
- Label: YZY; Gamma
- Songwriters: Ye; André Troutman; Che Pope; James Price; Justino Macosso; Samuel Lindley; Quentin Miller
- Producers: Ye; André Troutman; Che Pope; Just da 1; the Legendary Traxster; Sheffmade

Music videos
- "King" on Apple Music

Audio sample
- The intro and part of the first verse to "King": file; help

"King" (stylized in all caps) is the opening track from American rapper Kanye West's twelfth studio album, Bully (2026). It was released on March 28, 2026 through YZY and Gamma. West wrote the track alongside Quentin Miller, Che Pope, Just da 1, the Legendary Traxster, André Troutman, and Sheffmade, producing it with the latter five. The song features similar elements to West's sixth studio album, Yeezus (2013), as well as a prominent sample of "Man: Don’t Cry Baby – Why? – Reach for a Star" by Duke Edwards and the Youngones.

West originally included "King" as Bully's fifteenth track on a pre-release track listing before making it the opener during a listening party for the album. The song received positive reception from music critics after its release, who often praised the production and compared it to Yeezus, though some of West's fans criticized a lyric that referenced civil rights activist Martin Luther King Jr.

Commercially, "King" peaked at number eleven on the US Hot R&B/Hip-Hop Songs chart and number 40 on the US Billboard Hot 100, as well as appearing in three single charts from the UK and charts from multiple countries. West first performed the song live during his concerts at SoFi Stadium in Los Angeles on April 1 and 3. A music video for "King" was released on June 19, 2026, which depicts West and three other passengers on a blue convertible before launched into an electric chair with a crown connected to an electrode.

== Background and release ==
On September 28, 2024, during his performance at the Wuyuan River Stadium in Haikou, China, Kanye West announced his studio album Bully. Upon its announcement, it was described as a concept album inspired by West's solitude living in Tokyo. In March 2025, in the midst of his manic episode and antisemitic controversies, West released Bully as a visual album and early version on March 18, 2025. According to Rolling Stone, West finished recording Bully before his Wall Street Journal apology for antisemitic statements in January 2026.

Following multiple delays of the album, on March 25, 2026, West previewed a new track list for Bully, claiming that the album would have "no AI," with "King" being the fifteenth track. It was played at a listening event for the album two days later, the day it was supposed to release, now being played as the opening track. Bully released a day later through YZY and Gamma, with the song being sequenced in the same spot. West later performed the track during his concerts at SoFi Stadium in Los Angeles on April 1 and 3. On September 3 and 4, he performed "King" again during his two-night concert at Soldier Field in Chicago.

== Composition and lyrics ==
Slightly over two minutes long, "King" begins with a sample of "Man: Don’t Cry Baby – Why? – Reach for a Star" by Duke Edwards and the Youngones, where Edwards proclaims that "now is the time, for nature and all her glory have named you her king." West's opening verse reflects on his past controversies, rapping that although outside hatred only gave him "more love", his friends became "lost ones" who treated him like an orphan. West tries to explain himself and face reality, acknowledging that said controversies have changed his legacy.

West salutes civil rights activist Martin Luther King Jr., rapping that he would not have a 'White Queen' without him, referring to his relationship with Australian architect Bianca Censori. West married Censori in December 2022 under a confidential marriage license. Censori directed the music video for the song "Father".

== Critical reception ==
"King" received positive reviews from music critics. Vibe's Preezy Brown ranked it as the fourth best on Bully, praising West's lyricism. Writing for Rolling Stone, Jeff Ihaza called "King" a standout on the album. In a ranking for Billboard, Michael Saponara placed it at five in his ranking of Bully, comparing the production to West's sixth studio album, Yeezus. RapTV's Taiyo Coates also praised the production, lauding the sample as "perfectly placed" and ranking "King" as the third best song on the album. Marcos Gendre from Mondo Sonoro described it as a "full-blown banger", comparing the track to West's other albums Yeezus and The Life of Pablo. West's line about Martin Luther King Jr. received mixed opinions from fans; some praised the line, while others criticized it and labeled it as "tone-deaf" or "disrespectful".

== Commercial performance ==
Upon release, "King" received 2.62 million streams on Spotify on its first day, reaching number 37 on the platform's global chart. On Apple Music, the song opened at number four on the service's top songs chart. Commercially, it appeared on two U.S. charts, peaking at number eleven on the Hot R&B/Hip-Hop Songs chart and number 40 on the Billboard Hot 100. The song remained for three weeks on the Hot R&B/Hip-Hop Songs chart and two on the Hot 100. "King" also made similar success in the United Kingdom, peaking at number ten on UK Hip-Hop/R&B Singles, number 21 on Independent Singles, and number 47 on the main UK Singles charts. In Australia, the song peaked at number 64 on its official singles chart, faring greater success at number six on its Hip-Hop/R&B singles chart. Internationally, "King" appeared on official charts from Canada, Ireland, Lithuania, the Netherlands, New Zealand, Portugal, Slovakia, Sweden, and Switzerland. In addition, the song peaked at number 62 on the Billboard Global 200. Following the release of the deluxe version of Bully, the song re-entered the New Zealand Hot Singles Chart.

== Music video ==
A screenshot of the "King" music video, featuring West driving with other characters in a desaturated scene.

The music video for "King", directed by Censori, was released on June 19, 2026, coinciding with the release of the album's deluxe edition, which featured an updated mix and master of the song. The music video depicts West driving various passengers in a blue convertible down a dusty road with a mountainside backdrop. West and the three other passengers wear blue clothing, and rarely acknowledge each other throughout the music video.

The convertible is followed closely by a police car that flashes its lights as West drives slowly. In the middle of the music video, three women suspend from the clouds onto the car, interpreted as West's guardian angels. A nurse passenger injects a blue substance into West's neck, before he forces the brakes on and launches outwards into an electric chair where two officers crown his head with an electrode.

Visually, the music video emphasizes imagery rather than a conventional narrative, inspired by Censori's background in architecture and design. Emann Odufu of The Root described its intention as representing "West's life, biblical symbolism, and the archetype of the king that extends far beyond the artist himself." Hypebeast writer Sophie Caraan described the music video's conclusion as a visual metaphor that interrogates themes of power and public perception, though performance, gesture, and spatial composition.

== Credits and personnel ==
Credits are adapted from Spotify, publishing provided to Billboard, and the Mechanical Licensing Collective.

- Ye – vocals, writing, production, programming
- André Troutman – writing, production
- Che Pope – writing, production
- James Price (Sheffmade) – writing, production
- Justino Macosso (Just da 1) (Note: Erroneously credited as "2 Vicious" on both Spotify and in the Billboard publishing.) – writing, production
- Samuel Lindley (The Legendary Traxster) – writing, production
- Quentin Miller – writing

== Charts ==
Chart performance for "King"
Chart (2026)	Peak Position
Australia (ARIA)	64
Australia Hip-Hop/R&B (ARIA)	6
Canada Hot 100 (Billboard)	42
Global 200 (Billboard)	62
Ireland (IRMA)	55
Lithuania (AGATA)	70
Netherlands (Single Top 100)	100
New Zealand Hot Singles (RMNZ)	3
Portugal (AFP)	86
Slovakia Singles Digital (ČNS IFPI)	74
Sweden Heatseeker (Sverigetopplistan)	9
Switzerland (Schweizer Hitparade)	87
UK Hip Hop/R&B (Official Charts)	10
UK Independent (Official Charts)	21
UK Singles (Official Charts)	47
US Billboard Hot 100	40
US Hot R&B/Hip-Hop Songs (Billboard)	11
