= Everybody (¥$ song) =

Unreleased song by Kanye West and Ty Dolla Sign

Song by ¥$ featuring Charlie Wilson and Lil Baby
- Recorded: 2023
- Genre: Hip-hop; dirty rap
- Songwriters: Kanye West; Tyrone Griffin Jr.; Dominique Jones; London Holmes; Timothy Mosley; William Adams Jr.; Dag Volle; Karl Sandberg
- Producers: West; Evian Christ; London on da Track; Timbaland; will.i.am

"Everybody" is an unreleased song by American hip-hop superduo ¥$, composed of rapper Kanye West and singer Ty Dolla Sign, featuring American singer Charlie Wilson and American rapper Lil Baby. West produced the track with Evian Christ, London on da Track, Timbaland, and will.i.am. With the exception of Wilson, all vocalists and producers wrote the song together. A hip-hop and dirty rap track, it primarily uses an interpolation of the Backstreet Boys' 1997 single "Everybody (Backstreet's Back)".

It was intended to be the second single (Note: Certain sources refer to "Everybody" as the album's lead single despite its title track being released as a single on November 22, 2023, more than two weeks before West first previewed the song.) from the duo's debut studio album, Vultures 1 (2024), being previewed during several listening events for the album and featured in its promotional material. Ultimately, the song was scrapped, as West was likely unable to clear its chorus due to the interpolation of "Everybody (Backstreet's Back)". Despite this, West and Ty Dolla Sign have continued to perform it at listening events and concerts.

== Background and promotion ==
Prior to creating "Everybody", both Charlie Wilson and Lil Baby had collaborated with Kanye West. Wilson provided additional vocals for songs from West's albums My Beautiful Dark Twisted Fantasy (2010) and Ye (2018), and was prominently featured on "Bound 2" from West's sixth studio album, Yeezus (2013). Lil Baby made a guest appearance alongside Canadian singer the Weeknd on the single "Hurricane" from West's tenth studio album, Donda (2021). While recording Vultures 1 in Saudi Arabia during November 2023, videos of West and Ty Dolla Sign recording with Lil Baby surfaced online.

West teased "Everybody" through an Instagram post on December 9, depicting him overlooking a skyline with his back turned to the camera as the song played in the background. Later that day, Ty Dolla Sign posted a tracklist for Vultures 1 to his account, featuring "Everybody" as the album's opening track. West and Ty Dolla Sign previewed the track in full during their Vultures Rave event in Miami, Florida on December 12. After the event, TMZ reported that West had failed to clear its interpolation of "Everybody (Backstreet's Back)", alleging that the members of Backstreet Boys disapproved of West using the song. Since West had interpolated the song rather than sampling it, he would only need approval from its songwriters, being Max Martin and the estate of Denniz Pop, to use it. Though it was never confirmed if West sought out their approval, with Martin's publisher refusing to discuss any "legal matters", it is likely that West was denied, as Vultures 1 released on February 10, 2024, without "Everybody" on its track listing.

== Composition ==
"Everybody"
In "Everybody", West raps about being attacked by the entertainment industry, with New York Times critic Joe Coscarelli noting that the track "seem[s] to allude to his potential status as an entertainment industry pariah".

"Everybody" prominently interpolates "Everybody (Backstreet's Back)", featuring a rendition sung by Wilson as its chorus, where the line "Backstreet's back, alright!" is changed to "Yeezy's back, alright!". The song also interpolates its bassline, which is used during the verses. West raps about feeling ostracized by the music industry, saying they want to kill and "MeToo" him, adding that they're waiting for him to "say the wrong thing". Ty Dolla Sign and Lil Baby also perform verses.

== Live performances ==
Though it was never released, West and Ty Dolla Sign have played "Everybody" during most of their live performances as ¥$. As noted by Variety, performing the song in public would not constitute a copyright violation, as opposed to releasing it on music streaming services. It was played during the Vultures 1 release party at UBS Arena on February 10 despite being cut from the album. On February 24, the duo performed it at the Mediolanum Forum in Milan, where the crowd sang along as West's wife Bianca Censori recorded the event on her phone. At their September 15 show in Haikou's Wuyuan River Stadium, West performed the track while accompanied by his children and Censori. On January 30 and 31, 2026, at West's Mexico City's Monumental Plaza de Toros La México concerts, West performed it while accompanied by his daughter, North West. West performed the track again in his concerts in Los Angeles, Chicago, Jakarta, and Houston.
