= This One Here =

2026 song by Kanye West

Song by Kanye West

from the album Bully
- Released: March 28, 2026
- Recorded: 2022–2026
- Length: 3:00
- Label: YZY; Gamma
- Songwriters: Ye; André Troutman; Caleb Toliver; Michael Akinlosotu; Mike Moore; Nkenge Kamau; Quentin Miller; Rashon Murph
- Producers: Ye; André Troutman; Mike Moore; RaMu; TK the Legend

Music video
- "This One Here" on YouTube

"This One Here" (stylized in all caps) is a song by American rapper Kanye West from his twelfth studio album, Bully (2026). West wrote it alongside Quentin Miller, Don Toliver, Nkenge 1x, and producers André Troutman, Mike Moore, RaMu, and TK the Legend; English musician James Blake was originally being credited as a songwriter and producer before he asked to be removed. The song originated from West's unreleased collaborative album with Blake titled War, which was worked on throughout 2022 and previewed at a party in London in September 2022. Lyrically, "This One Here" features West singing about personal growth and letting go of his ego.

== Background and recording ==
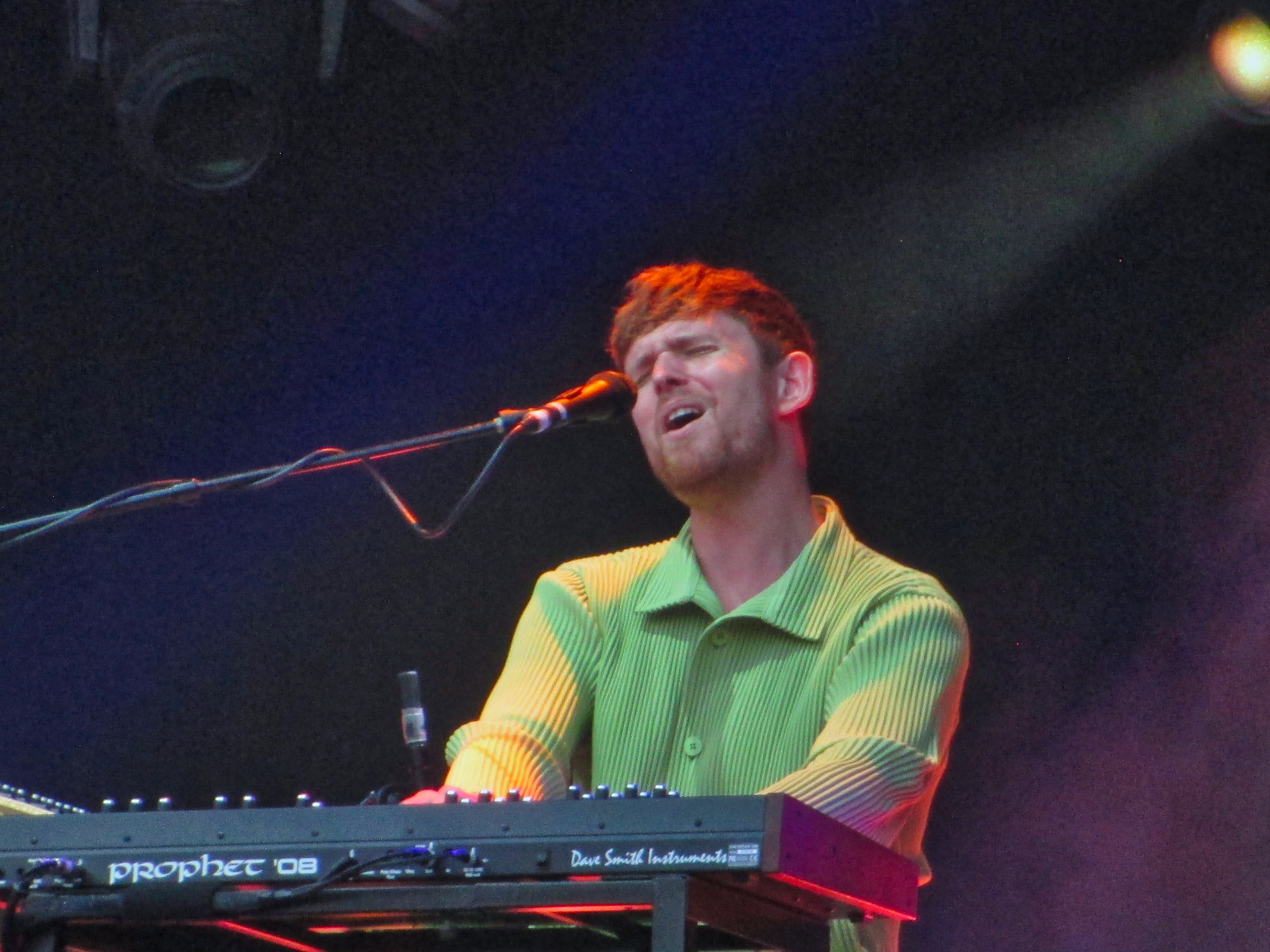
James Blake performing in August 2022, a month before he and Kanye West previewed an earlier version of "This One Here".

Kanye West and English musician James Blake maintained a close relationship prior to creating "This One Here" together. In 2013, West said, "I listen to James Blake the most, that's like my favorite artist. Just go listen to his music and say 'Hey that's Kanye's favorite artist'." West was subsequently intended to appear on Blake's album The Colour in Anything (2016), but according to Blake, his verse never materialized. After many years, Blake and West started working on a collaborative album entitled War in 2022, where "This One Here" was worked on during its sessions. West previewed several tracks with Blake at a party in London in September 2022, and a full copy of the unreleased album leaked online by December 2025. Addressing the leak on Twitter, West stated: "The whole album that leaked is made from freestyles that I did with James over his beats. You can tell because there's missing words." According to Blake, only his original vocal pitching and song structure were retained on the final song; his major contributions were mostly removed or reworked by other people, leading him to ask for his producer credit to be revoked.

The final version of "This One Here" was produced by West alongside André Troutman, Mike Moore, RaMu, and TK the Legend, who all wrote it with Don Toliver, Nkenge 1x, and Quentin Miller. TK the Legend began working on Bully after Troutman, West's music director, invited him onto the production team, later reflecting in an interview with 1883 Magazine that the process "strengthened my confidence and reminded me that the instincts I've developed independently can exist on the biggest stages."

== Composition and lyrics ==
"This One Here" is one of the longer songs on Bully, with its three-minute runtime surpassing the usual two-minute length of most tracks. Throughout the song, West ad-libs the phrases "Come on, it's go time" and "Lights on, showtime" in the background. Lyrically, West talks about his personal growth and moving on from his past, claiming to have "kicked all the ego right out of the door” in an effort to admit his mistakes and move forward as the best version of himself. "This One Here" is the final track on Bully, which Billboard described as a "healing album finisher" with repetitive vocals. The National Review interpreted the lyrics as West describing the cultural tensions of marriage, fellowship, and solidarity, and rapping about the feeling of being misunderstood.

== Release and reception ==
West initially released "This One Here" as part of a short film for a demo version of the album on March 18, 2025, titled Bully V1. Matt Sorce of the Loyola Phoenix described this version as a "lackluster conclusion for the middling album" in his review of the demo, criticizing the lack of progression. The song was released as the album's eighth track on physical releases.

"This One Here" was officially released to streaming services on March 28, 2026, as the outro track on Bully, through YZY and Gamma. Shortly after, Blake requested for his production and songwriting credits on the song to be removed, citing major differences between the original version and the version that was released. On June 19, 2026, West released the deluxe version of Bully, which updated "This One Here" with re-recorded vocals. Upon its original release, Billboard's Michael Saponara ranked the track as the ninth-best off the album, saying: "West delivers a healing album finisher to close the hook on Bully". Marcos Gendre from Mondo Sonoro called the song a "spiritual reverberation" of the gritty bass on West's sixth studio album, Yeezus (2013).

== Credits and personnel ==
Credits are adapted from YouTube Music and publishing provided to Billboard.

- Ye – writing, production, lead vocals, programming, vocal production
- André Troutman – writing, co-production
- Mike Moore – writing, co-production, keytar
- Michael Akinlosotu (TK the Legend) – writing, co-production, background vocals, engineering
- Rashon "RaMu" Murph – writing, production
- Caleb "Don" Toliver – writing, vocal production
- Nkenge 1x – writing, mixing, recording, mastering
- Quentin Miller – writing, vocal production
- John Scott – mixing, recording
- Josh Schuback – mixing, recording

== Charts ==
Chart performance for "This One Here"
Chart (2026)	Peak position
New Zealand Hot Singles (RMNZ)	11
US Bubbling Under Hot 100 (Billboard)	3
US Hot R&B/Hip-Hop Songs (Billboard)	32
