= André Troutman =

American musician and talkbox artist

- Born: André Lavern Troutman; November 25, 1989 (age 36); Jacksonville, Florida, U.S.
- Genres: Hip-hop; R&B
- Occupations: Musician; songwriter; singer; producer
- Instrument: Talk box
- Years active: 2016–present

André Lavern Troutman (born November 25, 1989) is an American musician, singer songwriter, and producer. He is best known for his appearance as a featured artist and producer on Kanye West's twelfth studio album, Bully (2026), and also serves as West's music director.

== Early life ==
André Lavern Troutman was born in Jacksonville, Florida on November 25, 1989.

Troutman is the younger cousin of the musician Roger Troutman, founder of the funk band Zapp and a pioneer of the talk box, which influenced his usage of the instrument. He first became interested in the talk box after seeing his cousin Rufus play one during a family reunion in Ohio, and after asking him how he played it, he went to Guitar Center to purchase his own. Troutman originally wanted to play the instrument with a keytar to look "cool", and described the talk box's learning curve as featuring "[a] lot of practice, a lot of weird faces, and a lot of bad notes" before he could properly play it.

== Career ==
Troutman has worked as a talk box performer and collaborator in contemporary R&B and hip-hop, contributing to recordings and live performances with various artists. He has been featured on projects by R&B artists including Major and Rhyon Nicole Brown.

Troutman contributed talk box to the song "Same Time, Pt. 1" by the American rapper Big Sean from his album I Decided (2017). That same year, he appeared as a featured performer on "Fired Up" from Eric Darius's album Breakin' Thru (2017).

In 2023, he was featured as part of "The Link Up", a collaborative performance series led by American singer-songwriter Coco Jones that highlighted emerging Black musicians, where he performed as a talk box player during live reinterpretations of R&B songs. Troutman also appeared in additional performances with Jones, contributing talk box to her covers of songs including Destiny's Child's "8 Days of Christmas" and Mary J. Blige's "Real Love".

In March 2025, Troutman began working with the American rapper Kanye West as his music director, and was a performer at West's January 2026 Mexico City shows and at the April 2026 SoFi Stadium concerts, which broke multiple SoFi Stadium records. In May 2026, Troutman served as the music director for West's concert at the Atatürk Olympic Stadium in Istanbul, Turkey, which drew a record-breaking crowd of 118,000 fans. During this time, Troutman also contributed to Bully, the twelfth studio album by West, where he is credited among the album's writers, producers, and performers. He is listed as a featured performer on "All the Love" and "White Lines". The former was described by Billboard as "the crown jewel of Bully" and ranked by Rolling Stone among the top songs on the album. This led to Troutman charting at number five spot on the Billboard Emerging Artists chart for April 11, 2026.

== Discography ==
Title	Year	Peak chart positions										Certifications	Album
Title	Year	US	US HH/R&B	AUS	CAN	UK	IRL	NZ	POR	WW	Smooth Jazz Airplay	Certifications	Album
"Fired Up" (Eric Darius featuring André Troutman and Rodney Jones Jr.)	2017	—	—	—	—	—	—	—	—	—	3	—	Breakin' Thru
"All the Love" (Kanye West featuring André Troutman)	2026	27	—	33	28	28	30	35	23	31	—	—	Bully
"White Lines" (Kanye West featuring André Troutman)	2026	82	22	—	87	—	—	—	168	196	—	—	Bully
"—" denotes a recording that did not chart or was not released in that territory.

=== Writing and production credits ===
Title	Year	Artist	Album	Role
"King"	2026	Kanye West	Bully	Writer, producer
"Father"	2026	Kanye West	Bully	Writer, producer
"All the Love"	2026	Kanye West	Bully	Writer, producer, performer
"Mama's Favorite"	2026	Kanye West	Bully	Writer, producer
"Sisters and Brothers"	2026	Kanye West	Bully	Writer, producer
"Bully"	2026	Kanye West	Bully	Producer
"Highs and Lows"	2026	Kanye West	Bully	Producer
"I Can't Wait"	2026	Kanye West	Bully	Producer
"White Lines"	2026	Kanye West	Bully	Performer
"Damn"	2026	Kanye West	Bully	Producer
"This One Here"	2026	Kanye West	Bully	Writer, producer
