= Last Breath (Kanye West song) =

2026 song by Kanye West featuring Peso Pluma

Promotional single by Kanye West featuring Peso Pluma (Note: Peso Pluma only appears on the album version.)

from the album Bully
- Language: English; Spanish
- Released: June 27, 2025 (single); March 28, 2026 (album version)
- Recorded: 2024–2026
- Genre: Corridos tumbados; hip-hop; latin pop
- Length: 3:07 (album version); 2:57 (deluxe version); 2:22 (single version)
- Label: YZY; Gamma
- Songwriters: Ye; Hassan Emilio Kabande Laija; Anthony Garcia; James Price; Mongo Santamaría; Nakamura Takahiro; Rafael Bautista; Tyrone Griffin Jr.
- Producers: Kanye West; Sheffmade

Music video
- "Last Breath" on YouTube

"Last Breath" (stylized in all caps) is a song by American rapper Kanye West featuring Mexican rapper Peso Pluma from the former's twelfth studio album, Bully (2026). It was released on March 28, 2026, through YZY and Gamma. The song was initially released as a promotional single in June 2025 without vocals from Pluma. West produced the song alongside Sheffmade, who both wrote it with Pluma, Ty Dolla Sign, Rafael "Fai" Bautista, and Anthony Garcia; Mongo Santamaría received credits for the track's interpolation of "Besamé Mama", while Nakamura Takahiro was credited for the sampling of "Legado".

A bilingual Spanish-English song with a salsa-influenced sound, the track is noted for its substantial Mexican influences reflected in its sound. The track came following a series of previews and an ongoing professional relationship between West and Pluma. Upon its release, the song received mixed reviews from critics and was acknowledged for its fusion of hip-hop and corridos tumbados. Commercially, "Last Breath" debuted at number 81 on the Billboard Hot 100 and ultimately peaked at number 5 on the US Hot Latin Songs chart, marking West's first top 10 placement in the category.

== Background and promotion ==
In a 2024 interview with Complex, Peso Pluma cited Kanye West as one of the artists whose music helped him develop his English. West maintained a prolonged musical association with Pluma since their 2024 collaboration on Rich the Kid's "Gimme A Second 2." Pluma was featured on the deluxe edition of ¥$'s second studio album, Vultures 2 (2024), on the song "Drunk."

"Last Breath" was first premiered alongside several other songs from Bully at a private, post-Grammy Awards event, hosted by West in Los Angeles on February 2, 2025. It was also included in Bully V1, the short film that accompanied demo versions of the album. The song's title was unknown at the time, with Billboard describing it as an "untitled song [where] West sings in Spanish over a mariachi-like backing track." The song was later shared on West's Twitter account in late March 2025, featuring the addition of Pluma's chorus and verse.

== Composition and lyrics ==
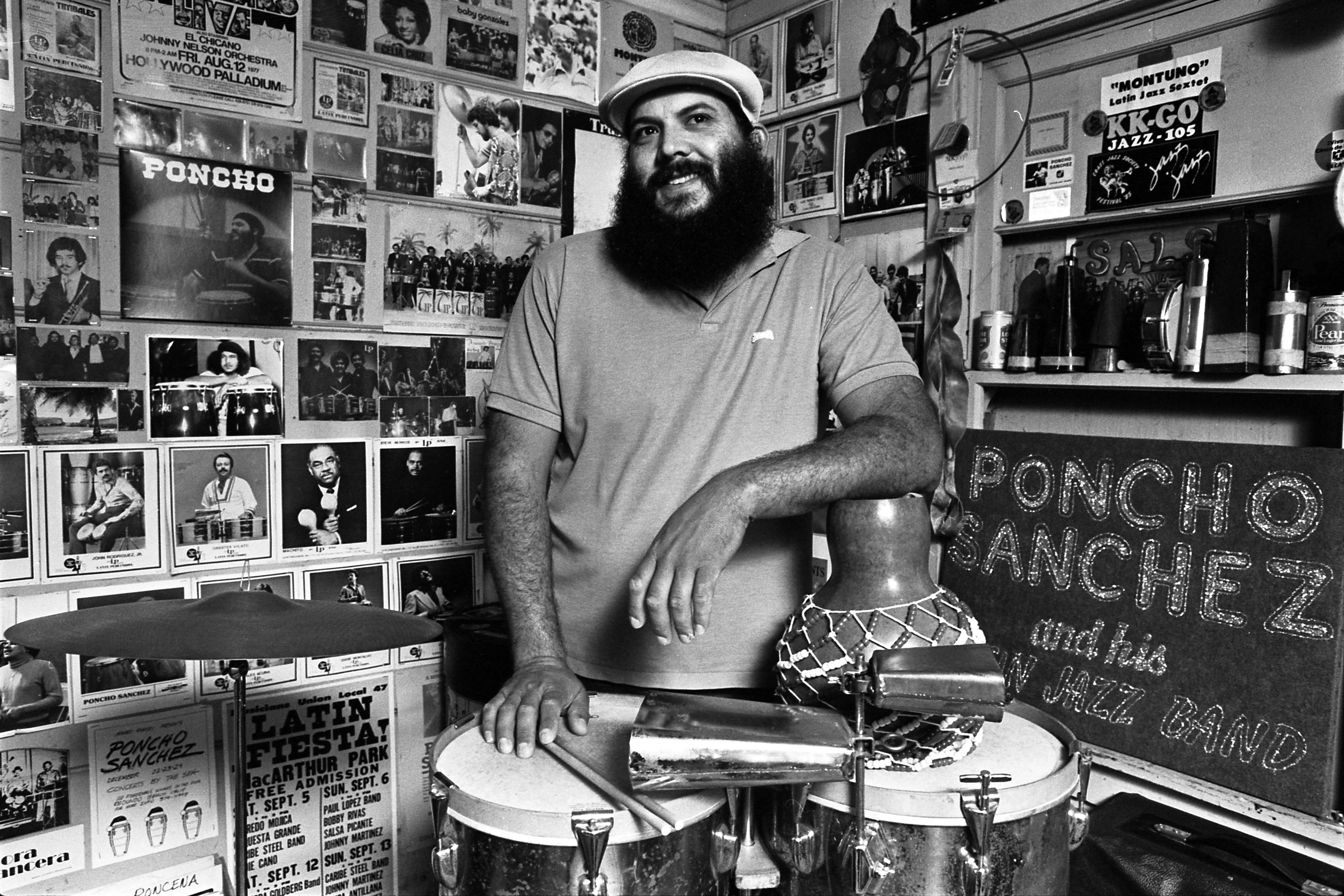
Poncho Sánchez in 1986 at his studio; his 1996 song "Bésame Mama" was interpolated in "Last Breath."

The song blends Spanish and English lyrics, incorporating a layered salsa loop with an interpolation of Poncho Sánchez's 1996 song "Bésame Mama" and a sample of "Legado" by Nakamura Takahiro. In the Bully V1, single, and physical release versions of the song, "Bésame Mama" is directly sampled rather than interpolated. Lyrically, the two explore themes of heartbreak, a trope popular with Mexican music.

El Heraldo de México described the track's rhythmic base as reminiscent of tropical music, noting its trumpets and percussion along with West's exchanging of Spanish and English. It further highlights the track's bass structure, its rap verses, and Peso Pluma's deep vocal performance. According to Infobae, Pluma's rapping incorporates stylistic elements characteristic of the corridos tumbados sound. CNN en Español similarly described its blend of hip-hop and corridos tumbados.

== Release ==
"Last Breath" was initially released as a two-track single on June 27, 2025, alongside "Losing Your Mind". (Note: The song released on Tidal on June 27, 2025, though it was reported by HotNewHipHop and The Flow to have released on July 4, 2025.) This original single did not include Pluma's vocals. It was later reissued as the seventeenth track on Bully on March 28, 2026, following a listening party held for the album. The album version arrived with a visualizer featuring a lucha libre-style wrestling setting with influences from comedian Chespirito and his television series El Chapulín Colorado.

== Critical reception ==
"Last Breath" received a mixed response from music critics, often praising the song’s cross-cultural importance while diminishing its vocal performances. Slant Magazine covered the track in their review of Bully, praising West's monotone delivery in contrast to Peso Pluma's "unbearably coarse vocals." Contrarily, Kelefa Sanneh of The New Yorker criticized West's "slightly uncanny Spanish-language delivery" on the track's second verse. In another review of Bully, a writer for Shatter the Standards wrote that the song’s salsa sample "does all the heavy lifting," while adding that Pluma's guest appearance "makes [West] sound like a guest on his own song."

Billboard positioned the song as the sixteenth best song on Bully in their ranking for the album, praising the song's potential. Gustavo Azem Martínez of El Heraldo de México stated that the song drew attention online, citing the artists' experimental approach, adding that "with [the] song, the connection between the U.S. music scene and Mexican musicians will be further solidified in the international market in 2026" (translated from Spanish). LatiNation praised the song as a "love letter to Mexican popular culture."

== Commercial performance ==
"Last Breath" debuted at number 81 on the US Billboard Hot 100, subsequently entering the US Hot Latin Songs chart at number five. On the Hot Latin Songs chart, it remained charting for three consecutive weeks. The song also received 4.3 million official streams in the United States during its first tracking week, earning it a spot at six on the Latin Streaming Songs chart. Elsewhere in North America, the track arrived at number 96 on the Canadian Hot 100. Globally, it made number 155 on the Global 200. The song reached number 175 on both the Portuguese Singles Chart and the Top Streaming Chart for the week of March 27 to April 2, 2026. According to Billboard, the song's positions were largely determined by streaming counts.

== Charts ==
Chart performance for "Last Breath"
| Chart (2026) | Peak position |
|---|---|
| Canada Hot 100 (Billboard) | 96 |
| Global 200 (Billboard) | 155 |
| Portugal (AFP) | 175 |
| US Billboard Hot 100 | 81 |
| US Hot Latin Songs (Billboard) | 5 |

== Credits and personnel ==
Credits adapted from Spotify and publishing provided to Billboard.

- Kanye West – writing, production, vocals
- Peso Pluma – writing, vocals
- Sheffmade – writing, production
- Ty Dolla Sign – writing, vocal production
- Rafael "Fai" Bautista – writing
- Anthony "PNP" Garcia – writing
- Mongo Santamaría – writing
- Nakamura Takahiro – writing
- John Scott – mixing, mastering, recording
- Josh Schuback – mixing, mastering, recording
- Nkenge 1x – mixing, mastering, recording
