= The Mad Lads =

American rhythm and blues vocal group

- Also known as: The Emeralds
- Origin: Memphis, Tennessee, United States
- Genres: R&B, soul music, doo-wop
- Years active: 1964–1972 occasionally after 1984
- Labels: Stax, Volt
- Past members: John Gary Williams; Julius Green; William Brown; Robert Phillips; Sam Nelson; Quincy Billups Jr. Daryl Grandberry

The Mad Lads were an American rhythm and blues vocal group, who recorded on the Stax subsidiary label Volt in the 1960s. Their biggest hits were "Don't Have to Shop Around" (1965) and "I Want Someone" (1966).

== Career ==
The group was formed at Booker T. Washington High School in Memphis, Tennessee, USA. The original line-up comprised John Gary Williams, Julius E. Green, William Brown and Robert Phillips. They were originally called The Emeralds, but changed their name because there was another group of that name; the name "Mad Lads" was suggested by Stax employee Deanie Parker in response to the group's behavior and also in recognition of local disc jockey Reuben "Mad Lad" Washington. They first recorded for Stax in 1964, releasing "The Sidewalk Surf", co-written by Isaac Hayes under the name Ed Lee, which was not a hit. However, their second record, "Don't Have to Shop Around", rose to no. 11 on the Billboard R&B chart, and no. 93 on the pop chart. Featuring organ by Hayes and piano by Booker T. Jones, it has nonetheless been described as "curiously anachronistic, owing more to doo-wop than southern soul," and featured "the high, innocent tenor of John Gary Williams."

They followed up with "I Want Someone", "I Want a Girl" and "Patch My Heart", which were all R&B hits in 1966. However, towards the end of the year Williams and Brown were drafted. The group continued to make live appearances with the pair being replaced by Sam Nelson and Quincy Billups Jr., but the new line-up's recordings were not as successful. After Williams returned from military service, he was reinstated in the group, over other members' protests, at the insistence of record company co-owner Jim Stewart. The group continued to have R&B chart hits through to 1969, their final hit being a version of "By the Time I Get to Phoenix" which also reached the pop chart. The group continued to record into 1973 and finally split up.

Williams recorded a solo album, John Gary Williams, at Stax in 1973. He later worked outside the music business in Iowa and Los Angeles, before forming a new touring version of the Mad Lads in 1984. The new group recorded an album, Madder Than Ever, in 1990.

Julius E. Green died on January 14, 2013. William C. Brown III died on July 24, 2015, aged 69. John Gary Williams died in May 2019, aged 73. The Mad Lads were inducted into the National Rhythm & Blues Hall of Fame Class of 2014.

== Discography ==
=== Albums ===
Year	Album	Chart positions		Label
Year	Album	US Pop	US R&B	Label
1966	The Mad Lads in Action	—	17	Volt Records
1969	The Mad, Mad, Mad, Mad, Mad Lads	180	46	Volt Records
1973	A New Beginning	—	—	Volt Records
1990	Madder Than Ever	—	—	Volt Records

=== Singles ===
Year	Single	Chart positions	
Year	Single	US Pop	US R&B
1964	"The Sidewalk Surf"	—	—
1965	"Don't Have to Shop Around"	93	11
1966	"I Want Someone"	74	10
1966	"Sugar Sugar"	—	—
1966	"I Want a Girl"	—	16
1966	"Patch My Heart"	—	41
1967	"I Don't Want To Lose Your Love"	—	—
1967	"My Inspiration"	—	—
1968	"Whatever Hurts You"	—	31
1968	"So Nice"	—	35
1969	"Love Is Here Today And Gone Tomorrow"	—	—
1969	"By the Time I Get to Phoenix"	84	28
1970	"Seeing Is Believin'"	—	—
1971	"Gone! The Promises Of Yesterday"	—	—
1972	"Let Me Repair Your Heart"	—	—
1973	"I'm So Glad I Fell In Love With You"	—	—
"—" denotes releases that did not chart.

== See also ==
- Soul Children
