= All the Love (Kanye West song) =

- Cover art for the SoFi visualizer

Song by Kanye West featuring André Troutman

from the album Bully
- Released: March 28, 2026
- Recorded: April 9, 2025 – February 2026
- Genre: Electropop; R&B; synthwave
- Length: 3:49
- Label: YZY; Gamma
- Songwriters: Ye; André Troutman; James Price; Blair Reese; Charles Njapa; Assi Rahbani; Mansour Rahbani; Rashon Murph; Tahj Clarke
- Producers: Ye; André Troutman; Che Pope; Quadwoofer; RaMu; Sheffmade

Music videos
- "All the Love" (SoFi Visualizer) on Apple Music; "All the Love" on YouTube

"All the Love" (stylized in all caps) is a song by the American rapper Kanye West featuring the American talk box musician André Troutman, released as the fourth track from the former's twelfth studio album, Bully (2026). West and Troutman produced it alongside Sheffmade, Quadwoofer, and RaMu, who all wrote the track with 88-Keys and Rasta Tahj while producing it with Che Pope; brothers Assi and Mansour Rahbani are credited for the sampling of "Fayek Alaya" by Lebanese singer Fairuz.

"All the Love" originated as "Gas Chambers" during sessions for West's unreleased studio album Cuck, and was worked on during April 2025 before leaking online, later becoming a track on Bully. Troutman became involved after hearing it during a rehearsal for a West concert and wanted to add talk box, causing an emotional experience that led him to work on the studio recording. The track received positive reviews from music critics upon release, mainly for the production and the performances of West and Troutman, though some criticized its lyrics as vague or insincere.

== Background and recording ==
"All the Love" was conceived by West during a livestream on April 9, 2025, where he improvised its lyrics as a rough, 8-minute long freestyle. Under the name "Gas Chambers", the song was worked on during early-to-late April as part of West's unreleased studio album Cuck, and West intended for his then-main songwriter Dave Blunts to write lyrics for it. The revised title "All the Love" first appeared officially on an April 28 tracklist for the album. A version with the "Gas Chambers" name was leaked online in May 2025—along with the rest of Cuck—following a charity crowdfunding campaign, the proceeds of which were donated to the United States Holocaust Memorial Museum. Earlier versions of the track feature West singing the word "lies" instead of "love" during the chorus, but are otherwise similar to the final song.

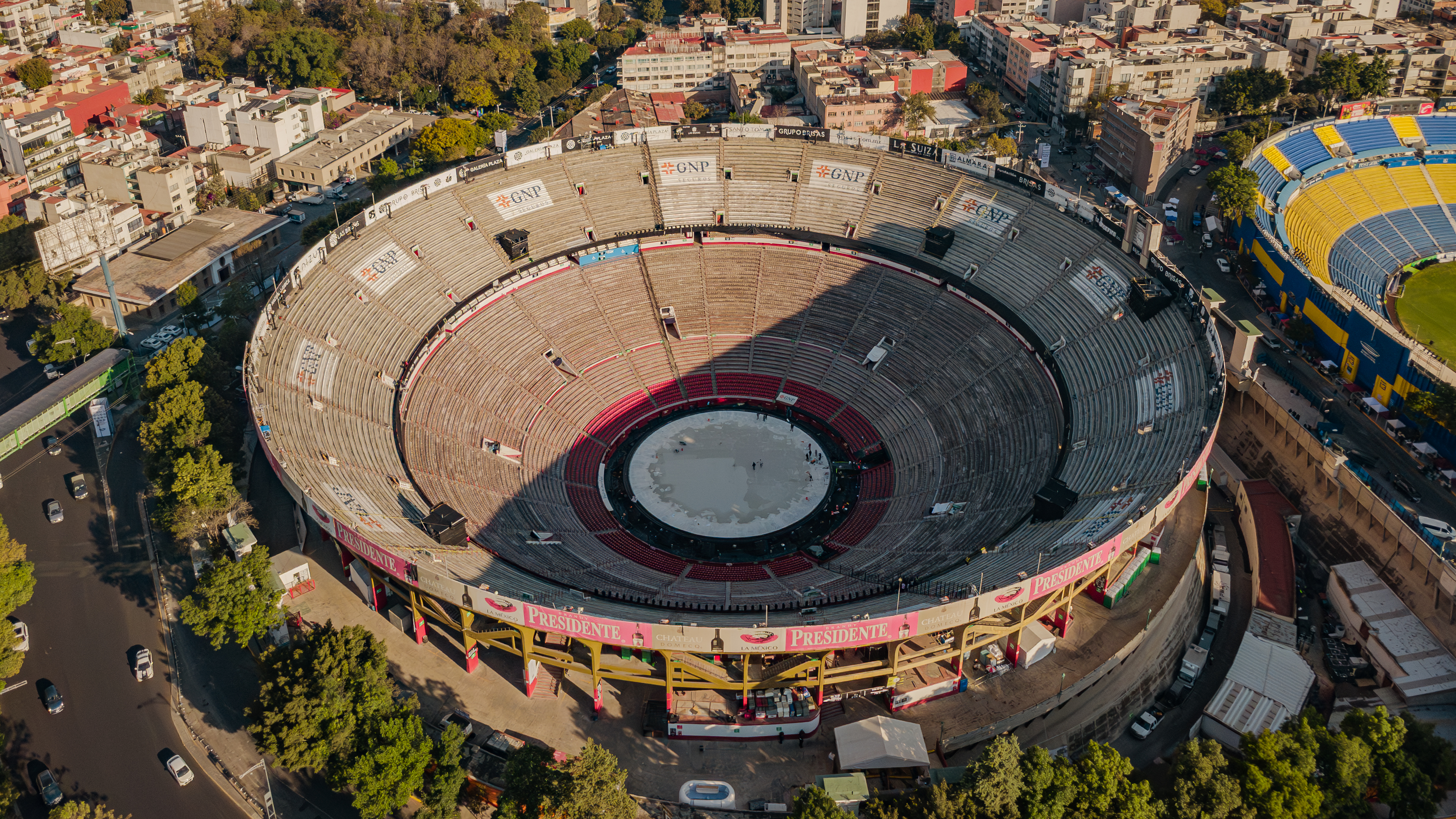
André Troutman had the idea to add talk box to "All the Love" during a rehearsal at the Plaza de Toros México (pictured)

While working on unrelated musical ventures for West, such as assembling the Hooligans vocal group, American musician André Troutman was asked by the rapper to provide extra instrumentation for his live shows, which soon turned into direct work on Bully. After hearing the drums of "All the Love" during a rehearsal for West's first show at the Plaza de Toros México in Mexico City, Troutman became interested in adding talk box to the track's performance and began practicing. He described the practice as "spiritual" and driving him to tears before West agreed to incorporate into the show, which according to Troutman, "very organic[ally]" led to his involvement in the studio version. Troutman later stated in an interview with Bars that his subsequent sessions with West taught him the importance of simplicity in music, claiming that a song is only special if it can retain its "magic" after having its elements stripped away.

== Composition and lyrics ==
"All the Love"
"All the Love" mixes synth-based production with West's melodic vocals, followed by André Troutman's vocals through a talk box.

"All the Love" features a prominent sample of "Fayek Alaya" (roughly translating to "you are awake over me" in English) by Lebanese singer Fairuz, originally written and composed by brothers Assi and Mansour Rahbani. The singer's vocals are stretched across the song's "gospel-inflected" production, consisting of 1980s-inspired synths, tribal drums, and a wailing melody. Music critics have compared it to the style of West's earlier albums, namely 808s & Heartbreak (2008), My Beautiful Dark Twisted Fantasy (2010), Yeezus (2013), and The Life of Pablo (2016).

"All the Love" opens with the electronic chant of "[w]e left all the pain behind". Troutman provides vocals as he sings through a talk box, and West performs melodically as well.

== Promotion and release ==
Preorder options for Bully, uploaded to the Yeezy website on January 3, 2026, included "All the Love" as the seventh track on a picture of the album's cassette. It was moved to track four following an updated track listing for the digital edition of the album, posted by West on March 25. Two days later, a shorter version of the song was played at the album's various listening events across the United States and livestreamed on YouTube an hour after midnight. The deluxe edition of Bully, released on June 19, includes a new recording of "All the Love" that removes the artificial intelligence (AI)-assisted vocals present on the original release.

== Critical reception ==
"All the Love" received universal acclaim from music critics, with many considering it a highlight of Bully. Michael Saponara of Billboard ranked it as the best song from the album, while Preezy Brown of Vibe placed it second. Complex's Peter A. Berry commented that it "sounds like Lion King in Space. Vague and platitudinal as it is, the hook is symbolic enough to feel cathartic, too." Kelefa Sanneh of The New Yorker said it "evokes the grandeur of the 'Twisted Fantasy' era, thanks in part to the contributions of André Troutman". Writing for Rolling Out, Eddy "Precise" Lamarre praised the album's production as strong, noting "All the Love" as an "anthemic" example. Jeff Ihaza of Rolling Stone lauded the song, writing, "Ye delivers some of his most melodically impressive work in recent memory, landing somewhere between his 808s-era melancholy and Life of Pablo extravagance."

Reviewing Bully for HotNewHipHop, Aron A. remarked, "There's a lack of vigor in his convictions that makes the record feel safe, especially when he leans into pop melodies and stadium-sized production on songs like 'All The Love'". though added that Troutman "remains a highlight" on the song, "bringing a voice that feels appropriately placed in 2026." Pitchfork's Kieran Press-Reynolds commented fhat the track "has the blissful throb of a radio hit from another era", though felt that knowing the original "Gas Chambers" title made its lyrics "ring trite and desperate." The song charted in both the UK and the US in April 2026. "All the Love" was named the seventh best song of 2026 by Complex.

== Credits and personnel ==
Credits are adapted from Spotify, the BMI Repertoire, (Note: Find additional credits for the song on the BMI Repertoire by searching the work number #81701167.) and publishing provided to Billboard.

- Ye – vocals, writing, production, programming
- André Troutman – vocals, writing, production
- Blair Reese (Quadwoofer) – writing, production
- James Price (Sheffmade) – writing, production
- Rashon "RaMu" Murph – writing, production
- Charles Njapa (88-Keys) – writing
- Tahj "Rasta" Clarke – writing
- Che Pope – production
- TK the Legend – engineering
- Nkenge 1x – recording, mixing, mastering

== Charts ==
Chart performance for "All the Love"
Chart (2026)	Peak position
Australia (ARIA)	33
Australia Hip Hop/R&B (ARIA)	5
Austria (Ö3 Austria Top 40)	43
Canada Hot 100 (Billboard)	28
Czech Republic Singles Digital (ČNS IFPI)	37
Global 200 (Billboard)	31
Greece International (IFPI Greece)	17
Iceland (Billboard)	6
Ireland (IRMA)	30
Latvia Streaming (LaIPA)	8
Lebanon (Lebanese Top 20)	8
Lithuania (AGATA)	18
Netherlands (Single Top 100)	43
New Zealand (Recorded Music NZ)	35
Norway (IFPI Norge)	40
Poland (Polish Streaming Top 100)	33
Portugal (AFP)	24
Romania (Billboard)	17
Slovakia Singles Digital (ČNS IFPI)	31
South Africa Streaming (TOSAC)	42
Sweden (Sverigetopplistan)	57
Switzerland (Schweizer Hitparade)	26
Turkey International Airplay (Radiomonitor Türkiye)	10
UK Singles (Official Charts)	28
UK Independent (Official Charts)	7
UK Hip Hop/R&B (Official Charts)	3
US Billboard Hot 100	27
