= Father (Kanye West song) =

2026 song by Kanye West featuring Travis Scott

- Wordmark displayed at the end of the music video

Song by Kanye West featuring Travis Scott

from the album Bully
- Released: March 28, 2026
- Recorded: November 2025
- Genre: Industrial hip-hop
- Length: 2:49
- Label: YZY; Gamma
- Songwriters: Ye; Jacques Webster II; André Troutman; Che Pope; Che Smith; Jahaan Sweet
- Producers: Ye; Travis Scott; André Troutman; Che Pope; Jahaan Sweet; Sheffmade

Music video
- "Father" on YouTube

Audio sample
- The first verse and part of the chorus of "Father": file; help

"Father" (stylized in all caps) is a song by American rapper Kanye West, featuring fellow American rapper Travis Scott. It was released on March 28, 2026, with an accompanying music video, through YZY and Gamma, as the third track from West's twelfth studio album, Bully (2026). It is an industrial hip-hop song with a gospel sample. Lyrically, West reflects on his redemption, identity, and faith, while Scott delivers a faster flow that reflects on his upbringing.

In 2025, West and Scott's relationship became strained when the former posted controversial statements on his X account. They later reconciled when West made a surprise appearance at Scott's concert in Japan that November. The following month, a Beats Electronics ad featuring Scott was released, containing a snippet of an untitled song, which was later reported to be "Father".

The day before the release of Bully, "Father" was fully revealed at a California listening party. The song was also accompanied by a music video directed by West's wife, Bianca Censori. With sci-fi and religious elements, it features West attending a church with other unusual characters for Scott's wedding to two women, including a Michael Jackson impersonator sitting in the background. The song received positive reviews from music critics. Commercially, it topped Apple Music's top songs charts and appeared on multiple single charts, including the Billboard Hot 100, Global 200, and Hot R&B/Hip-Hop Songs charts, as well as on three UK charts and multiple countries elsewhere.

== Background and promotion ==
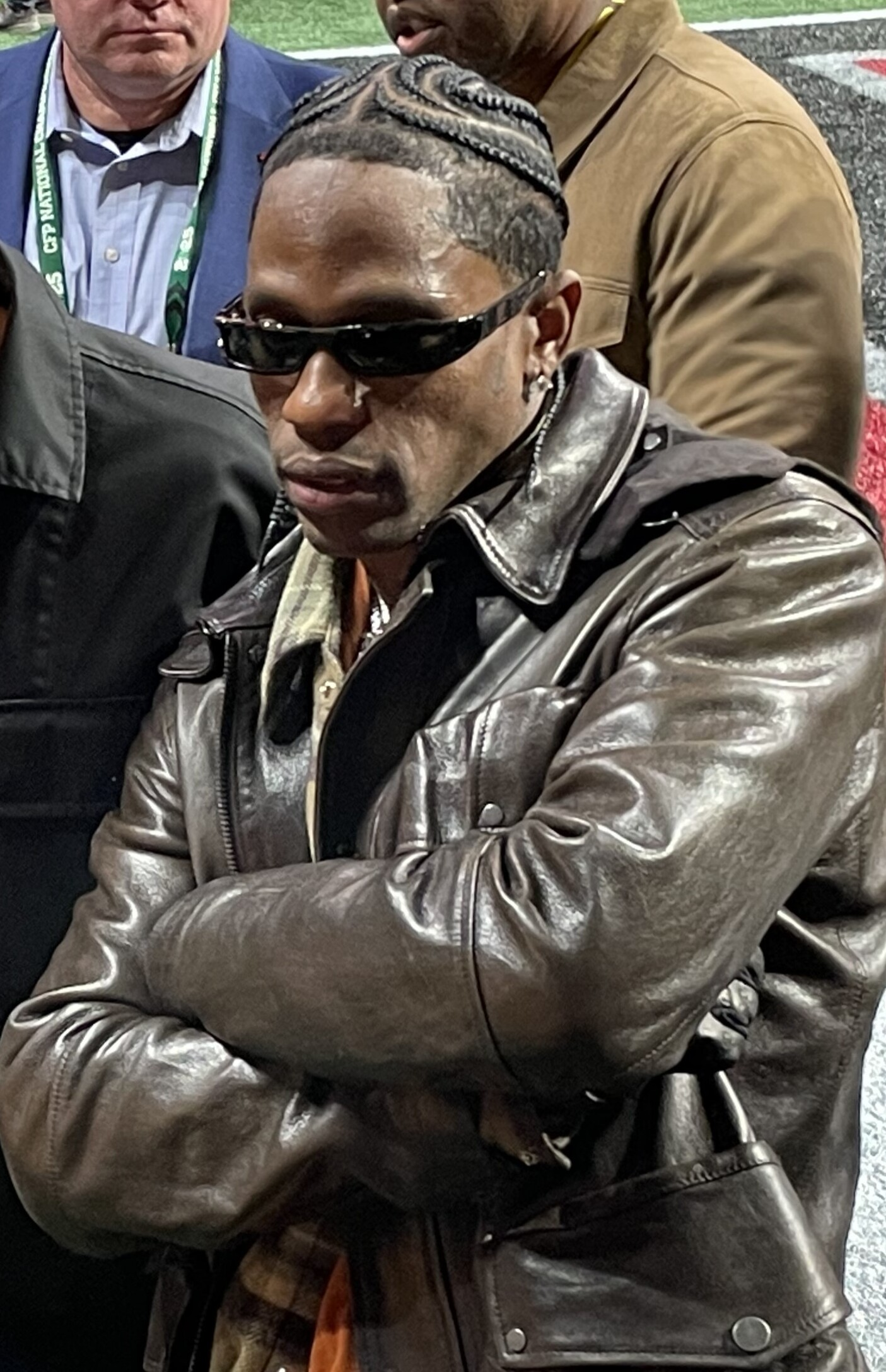
Travis Scott (pictured in 2025) collaborated with West on "Father".

West had maintained a long professional relationship with Scott since the latter worked on the former's compilation album, Cruel Summer (2012). Throughout the years, they collaborated on the singles "Champions" (2016) and "Wash Us in the Blood" (2020), with West appearing on Scott's Rodeo (2015) and "Watch" (2018), while Scott appeared on Donda (2021), Vultures 1, and the digital deluxe of Vultures 2 (2024). West also contributed production to Scott's album Utopia (2023), which featured reworkings of multiple songs originally from Donda.

Starting in February 2025, West's relationship with Scott became strained when the latter seemingly unfollowed the former on Twitter following controversial posts from supporting Sean Combs to various antisemitic statements. West later accused Scott of stealing credit from his songs recorded in the Wyoming sessions in 2018 and dismissed Scott's comments calling him "family". In November, they reconciled when West made a surprise appearance at Scott's concert in Tokyo as part of the latter's Circus Maximus Tour, performing various songs from "Can't Tell Me Nothing" (2007) to "All of the Lights" (2010). In July 2026, Scott stated in a video with Variety that "Father" was recorded spontaneously while he and West were in Japan, reflecting that West "just had [his] verse in his brain."

In February 2026, record producer Havoc revealed to Complex that West might have been working on a collaborative album with Scott. A few days prior to the release of Bully (2026), a Beats Electronics ad from December 2025 featuring Scott resurfaced online. During the last seconds of the ad, a snippet of an untitled track plays in the background, which would later be revealed as "Father". On March 27, West premiered a livestream of the Bully listening party in Inglewood through YouTube an hour after midnight, featuring a guest appearance from Scott. Hours after its release, West removed the livestream from public view on YouTube. On March 28, a day after its intended release, the album was released to streaming services. On April 1 and 3, West performed the song at his two SoFi Stadium concerts in Los Angeles, with the latter concert featuring a surprise guest appearance from Travis Scott. On September 4, the two reunited to perform "Father" during West's concert at Soldier Field in Chicago.

== Composition and lyrics ==
On "Father", West (pictured in 2026) reflects on redemption and identity, vowing to leave behind his old self.

"Father" introduces itself with angelic church organs as it relies on a vocal sample from gospel singer Johnnie Frierson. In a runtime of two minutes and forty-nine seconds, the song blends a gospel influence with "hard-hitting momentum" that relies on "heavy synth bass" and industrial drums. From analysis by Collins Badewa of Style Rave, the song shares a thoughtful, meditative perspective that explores themes of "redemption, identity, and the tension between fame and faith", in contrast to West's usual emphasis on spectacle. Rather than an overwhelming start, "Father" builds up gradually with more layers that highlight its emotional impact as West raps about humility through leaving his old self behind and describing his new sense of self. Scott later appears on the song's second verse with "a faster flow and a more clear vocal tone" while giving a shoutout to Nike, stemming from his long association with the athletic shoe brand, as well as recounting his upbringing from rough neighborhoods to the riches of Malibu.

== Reception ==
Michael Saponara of Billboard ranked "Father" the fourth best track from Bully, commenting that Scott was one of the few major recording artists to "not turn their back on West in recent years." Preezy Brown of Rolling Stone also ranked it as the fifth best track from the album, comparing the rappers' chemistry to "Otis" (2011). Gabriel Bras Nevares of HotNewHipHop considered the song to be "one of the big highlights" on the album. However, Zakaria Mafa of Stanisland considered its production unclear and its lyrics as shallow. Collins Badewa of Style Rave offered a positive review to the song, considering "Father" to be one of the most emotional tracks from Bully, and credited its themes of spirituality and growth.

Upon the song's release, "Father" topped Apple Music's top songs chart and received over four million streams on Spotify during its first day. Commercially, it debuted at number six on the Hot R&B/Hip-Hop Songs chart, number 16 on the Rhythmic Airplay chart, number 21 on the Billboard Hot 100, and number 28 on the Global 200. In the United Kingdom, "Father" debuted at number 27 on the UK singles chart, number six on Independent Singles, and number two on Hip Hop/R&B Singles charts. In Australia, the song debuted at number 32 on its main singles chart, but fared better on its Hip Hop/R&B Singles chart, debuting at number four. Internationally, "Father" made chart appearances in Austria, Canada, the Czech Republic, Iceland, Ireland, Latvia, Lithuania, the Netherlands, New Zealand, Nigeria, Norway, Poland, Portugal, Romania, Slovakia, South Africa, Sweden and Switzerland.

== Music video ==
A screenshot of the "Father" music video, featuring West and other characters attending a wedding at a minimalist church

On March 28, 2026, the music video to "Father" was released on YouTube, which was directed by West's wife Bianca Censori, her directorial debut. Within twenty-four hours, it received over five million views on YouTube. During an interview with Architectural Digest Middle East in March 2026, Censori explained the concept of the music video, stating that the motive for the video being taken in a single shot was to construct a long take that only exists within a dream. where "unrelated characters, worlds and temporalities collide within one continuous space." She later revealed that the architecture of the video was critical, wanting to highlight multiple scenarios within the same timing and space in a boundary between reality and surrealism. The music video is reminiscent of the work of director Jacques Tati, prominent in the late 1960s, where a one-take forces the audience's attention to "stay attentive in a constant present tense" with themes of God and religion. West has previously used religious imagery and themes in his music videos, including "Jesus Walks" (2004) and songs from his studio album Jesus Is King (2019).

A single-shot music video, it takes place in a minimalist church, with West, "dressed in a gray suit and stone-colored cowboy boots" sporting a straight face, and other attendees from elderly women to nuns appearing in the background. As the song begins, a series of bizarre events occur, including when an attendant's card tricks evolve into flames before a police squad, next to a plate-armored knight on horseback, arrives to arrest a nun and carry her out of the church, and a pageant queen is carried down the aisle. Later on, two astronauts arrive to unmask West as an extraterrestrial alien before carrying him out of the church, right before Scott appears in his wedding to two women.

Throughout the music video's chaos, much of the attendees appear unbothered. Concluding the music video, most of the attendees leave the church, as a man enters with a large wooden crucifix and sits in West's spot. Thematically, it ranges from sci-fi elements involving aliens, UFOs, and astronauts, to religious imagery with a dancing choir group and crucifix, along with a knight on horseback. The music video also includes an uncredited individual sitting in the background who resembles Michael Jackson, later confirmed to be impersonator Fabio Jackson after he reposted content about the video on Instagram. Jackson later faced backlash for appearing in the music video due to West's controversies and impersonating the late icon.

== Credits and personnel ==
Credits are adapted from Tidal, Global Music Rights, and publishing provided to Billboard.

- Kanye West – vocals, writing, production
- Travis Scott – vocals, writing, production
- André Troutman – writing, production
- Che Pope – writing, production
- Jahaan Sweet – writing, production
- Che Smith (Rhymefest) – writing
- Sheffmade – production

== Charts ==
Chart performance for "Father"
Chart (2026)	Peak position
Australia (ARIA)	32
Australia Hip Hop/R&B (ARIA)	4
Austria (Ö3 Austria Top 40)	60
Canada Hot 100 (Billboard)	25
Czech Republic Singles Digital (ČNS IFPI)	57
Global 200 (Billboard)	28
Greece International (IFPI Greece)	20
Iceland (Billboard)	11
Ireland (IRMA)	31
Latvia Streaming (LaIPA)	7
Lithuania (AGATA)	28
Netherlands (Single Top 100)	40
New Zealand (Recorded Music NZ)	33
Nigeria (TurnTable Top 100)	45
Nigeria Airplay (TurnTable)	7
Nigeria Hip-Hop/Rap (TurnTable)	2
Norway (VG-lista)	63
Poland Streaming (OLiS)	33
Portugal (AFP)	33
Romania (Billboard)	19
Slovakia Singles Digital (ČNS IFPI)	38
South Africa Streaming (TOSAC)	35
Sweden (Sverigetopplistan)	77
Switzerland (Schweizer Hitparade)	33
UK Hip Hop/R&B (Official Charts)	2
UK Independent (Official Charts)	6
UK Singles (Official Charts)	27
US Billboard Hot 100	21
US Hot R&B/Hip-Hop Songs (Billboard)	6
US Rhythmic Airplay (Billboard)	16
US R&B/Hip-Hop Airplay (Billboard)	7
