= Cuck (album) =

Unreleased studio album by Kanye West

Studio album (unfinished) by Kanye West
- Recorded: February–June 2025
- Length: 30:11
- Producers: Kanye West; 1srael; Che Pope; Chuki Beats; Dean Durkin; Digital Nas; Quadwoofer; Sheffmade; Templecitygrounds

Singles from Cuck
- 1. "WW3" Released: March 26, 2025; 2. "Cousins" Released: April 23, 2025; 3. "Heil Hitler" Released: May 8, 2025

Cuck, also known as WW3 and In a Perfect World, is an unreleased studio album by the American rapper Kanye West, who worked on it in collaboration with fellow rapper Dave Blunts between February and June 2025. The media personality DJ Akademiks announced it on April 2, 2025, a week after the release of the lead single, "WW3". Blunts's frequent collaborators Quadwoofer and Sheffmade were the primary producers, with contributions from West and Digital Nas, among others. Cuck drew outrage and condemnation for its antisemitic lyrical content.

In early 2025, West garnered controversy by making antisemitic statements, endorsing Nazism, and insulting past associates on his X (formerly Twitter) account. Blunts, Cuck's songwriter, wrote tracks based on conversations with West as well as West's X posts. The songs feature controversial subject matter such as praise for Adolf Hitler, West's incestuous relationship with a male cousin, nitrous oxide use, and defenses of Sean "Diddy" Combs. Some songs use artificial intelligence-generated audio deepfakes of West's voice over Blunts.

West promoted Cuck with the singles "Cousins" and "Heil Hitler" between April and May. Cuck was leaked online in May following a charity crowdfunding campaign, the proceeds of which were donated to the United States Holocaust Memorial Museum. West began to retract his antisemitic statements afterwards, releasing censored versions of "WW3" and "Heil Hitler" and renaming the album In a Perfect World. By January 2026, West had apologized for his antisemitic remarks and removed the Cuck singles from streaming services. The Cuck song "Diddy Free" was given to Combs' son King Combs and released on his EP Never Stop (2025), while "Gas Chambers" was repurposed as "All the Love" for West's 2026 album Bully.

== Background and recording ==
=== Collaborations with Dave Blunts ===
In February 2025, West met Dave Blunts through a mutual connection after West became a fan of Blunts's music. Blunts played his then-unreleased album You Can't Say That (2025) to West, who loved it and asked him to write an entire album with a similar vibe, leading to the creation of Cuck. Blunts soon began writing and recording demos for the album, spending around 20 to 30 minutes on each and basing their lyrics off of his phone calls and in-person conversations with West, as well as tweets West was posting at the time. According to West, these calls would last several hours. Most of Blunts's songs were written quickly and received immediate praise from West, though he sometimes asked for rewrites, resulting in Blunts rewriting a track upwards of twenty times at West's request. Despite being known for his production, Blunts was not provided beats by West for recording, causing him to bring frequent collaborators Quadwoofer and Sheffmade with him when touring to ensure he would have material to write on. The duo later became the primary producers for Cuck.

Regarding the creation of "Cousins", Blunts recalled that he wrote the song for West after the latter told him about his former relationship with his cousin, being able to tell that the song was "very freeing for him" when conceptualizing it. Blunts believed West chose him for songwriting due to having a "blunt approach to it" without double entendres. Quadwoofer and Sheffmade were asleep when Blunts recorded his demo for the song, leading him to instead use a beat he downloaded off of YouTube. Blunts had repeatedly denied that the lyrical content of Cuck is antisemitic, describing the album as being "about one man going between hurt, betrayal and pain and he's putting that shit down..." On September 13, 2025, Blunts took to Instagram to announce that he was cutting ties with West and would no longer work on the album, urging him to "find God". He later released several diss tracks aimed at West, which alleged that West "groomed" him into writing the album's antisemitic lyrics.

=== Leak ===
On May 18, 2025, Cuck was leaked in its entirety after a US$999 crowdfunding campaign conducted via Discord, the proceeds of which were donated to the United States Holocaust Memorial Museum. According to a West fan who helped coordinate the fundraiser, the leak originated from a member of West's inner circle who opposed Cuck's content and sought "to fuck up the rollout and stop it from officially coming out". The leaked files included insults towards West in their metadata, such as the album cover being replaced by a 1994 photo of West wearing an anti-Nazi shirt with the title Fuck Nazis: 50 Year Old Loser Promoting Fascism and Hate Speech. When announcing the leak via Discord, the leakers condemned West as a "spineless, brainless, drug addict, porn-addicted Nazi bitch" saying "outrageous nonsense for attention".

The leak included previously unheard songs, such as "Diddy Free", a song defending Sean "Diddy" Combs amidst his federal racketeering trial and sexual misconduct allegations, and "Uncle", which tells the story of a woman forced into sex work. West responded to the leak by saying that "Uncle" was not part of Cuck and that its lyrics did not concern his wife Bianca Censori. He complained that the leak, alongside having Cuck songs get blocked from digital service providers and live performances canceled, "proves everything I'm saying and why I'm saying [it]".

== Promotion ==
=== Album rollout and singles ===
On March 6, West stated that his upcoming music would feature an "antisemitic sound". On March 16, he posted images of a Nazi swastika and the sig runes of the Schutzstaffel (SS), claiming them to be his "new album cover" and "new Sunday Service logo", respectively. West first teased the song "WW3" on March 15 on his Twitter account. Prior to its release, Blunts and streamer Adin Ross had reacted to the song; the latter initially expressed negative feelings, but later seemed to enjoy the song when reacting to it on stream with rapper Kodak Black. West released "WW3" as a single on March 26. On March 30, DJ Akademiks held an interview in which West wore a black Ku Klux Klan-inspired outfit and made further controversial remarks, including stating that he regrets having children with his ex-wife Kim Kardashian. He made negative remarks about various other celebrities, including Jay-Z, Beyoncé, Playboi Carti, Kendrick Lamar, Ty Dolla Sign, and the late Virgil Abloh. The following day, West released the music video to "WW3" on Twitter. The video contains a repurposed scene from the American television miniseries Roots alongside graphic sexual imagery featuring interracial sex and footage of a KKK gathering.

On April 2, DJ Akademiks announced that the album, initially titled WW3, would be released the next day, and shared the track listing. Akademiks also previewed the track "Bianca"; the lyrics of the track concern West's separation from his wife Bianca Censori, pleading with her to "come back". When the album failed to drop on April 3, West revealed the album cover, which depicts a male and female Klan member wearing white and red KKK-inspired outfits, respectively, posing in front of a stack of hay bales. The album cover is an edited version of the 2015 photo The wedding of two members of the KKK in a barn in rural America by Peter van Agtmael, who claimed that West's use of the photograph was unauthorized.

On April 21, West announced that he was changing the title of the album to Cuck (short for cuckold in popular culture), which he said represented "[his] whole style". He released the music video for the second single called "Cousins" the same day in a tweet, revealing the song is based on his cousin who was imprisoned for murdering a pregnant woman a few years after West told him they would not "look at dirty magazines together" anymore. The track contains lyrics discussing West's experience having an incestuous relationship with a male cousin as a child and his recreational use of nitrous oxide. The music video consists of low quality footage drawn from home media, TV commercials, and pornography. West posted a new tracklist for Cuck on X with the nickname "CUCK V2" on April 28.

On May 7, West stated on Twitter that he was uploading the third single called "Heil Hitler". On May 8, he released the music video for the single, featuring men draped in animal skins singing the chorus, with the outro sampling a speech by Adolf Hitler. West subsequently released the song on SoundCloud and Scrybe. West then stated on May 9 that the song was "banned by all digital streaming platforms". An instrumental version titled "The Heil Symphony" was uploaded in its place on May 14.

=== Retractions and alterations ===
On May 20, "WW3" was removed from all streaming services, followed by West tweeting that he was "done with antisemitism" following a FaceTime call with his children on May 22. He asked God to "forgive [him] for the pain I've caused" and said that he forgave those who caused him pain. He later re-uploaded the song, with new black cover art and censoring of the words "Nazis", "Swastikas", "Hitler", "Antisemitic" and "Mein Kampf". "The Heil Symphony" was also taken down, later re-uploaded with black cover art and the updated name "Hit Symphony". On May 31, an edited version of "Heil Hitler" titled "Hallelujah" was uploaded to YouTube before being added to streaming services, which replaces references to Nazism with Christianity.

On June 22, West posted to X that he was thinking about changing the album's name from "Cuck" to "In a Perfect World". He later posted "In a Perfect World", implying that it was the new title for the album. Blunts also updated the caption of an image of him and West on Instagram, changing it from "Cucks" to "In a Perfect World" to reflect the name change. In an interview with VladTV, Blunts claimed that West had moved on from antisemitic rhetoric, stating that, "he's not on that anymore, he's doing better now." The song "Diddy Free", originally featured on Cuck, was reworked and released on Never Stop on June 27, an extended play (EP) by Christian "King" Combs, which was executively produced by West.

West later played "Gas Chambers", also known as "All the Love", in a rehearsal a day prior to his concert in Shanghai on July 11, but he did not play the song during the concert. The album tracks "WW3" and "Hallelujah" were played at the concert on July 12 without West's approval or knowledge according to a post made by his team on Xiaohongshu, along with songs from his upcoming album Bully and his song with YoungBoy Never Broke Again, "Alive" (2025).

Since then, on November 17, "WW3," "Cousins", and "Heil Hitler", along with their alternate versions "Hallelujah" and "Hit Symphony", were removed from all streaming services following his apology to Rabbi Yoshiyahu Yosef Pinto. In January 2026, West published an open letter in The Wall Street Journal in which he apologized for his antisemitic remarks and behavior, stating his outbursts stemmed from manic episodes in which he "gravitated toward the most destructive symbol I could find, the swastika", as he refused to accept his bipolar disorder diagnosis. West said he was "deeply mortified by [his] actions" and pledged to take "accountability, treatment, and meaningful change". The song "Gas Chambers" was repurposed for Bully under its alternate title "All the Love", appearing in the tracklist for the album. West later played "All the Love" during his concerts in Mexico on January 30 and 31.

== Reception ==
In 2026, Pitchfork's Kieran Press-Reynolds said they preferred Cuck over Bully, writing that while Cuck "sprayed out plaudits for Hitler and demands to free Diddy... it was at least, at times, a shockingly vulnerable clusterfuck unlike anything a major star has released in history, and with unexpectedly hooky samples of underground rock and classic acid house. Even at his bleakest moments of self-professed nitrous and porn addiction, when he was prohibited from seeing his children, [West] still knew how to make a song."

== Track listing ==
All songs are reportedly written by Dave Blunts, except where noted. This track list refers to the May 18, 2025 leak.

Cuck track listing (Note: Find additional credits for "Cousins" on the BMI Repertoire by searching the work number #76510469.)
No.	Title	Writer(s)	Producer(s)	Length
1.	"WW3"	Blunts; James Price	Ye; 1srael; Quadwoofer; Sheffmade; Theevoni; G06 Beatz; Fvbii	1:44
2.	"Cosby"		Quadwoofer; Sheffmade	2:30
3.	"Diddy Free"			2:58
4.	"Dirty Magazines"			1:26
5.	"Jesus"			1:24
6.	"Bianca"			1:56
7.	"Cousins"	Ye; Blunts; Price; Jezmi Tarik Fehmi; Osayuki Asemota; Sam Fenton	Ye; Digital Nas; Chuki Beats	2:31
8.	"Virgil"			2:03
9.	"Uncle"			1:36
10.	"Free My Kids"			1:49
11.	"Heil Hitler"	Blunts; Price	Quadwoofer; Sheffmade	1:37
12.	"Gas Chambers"	Ye; Price; Blair Reese; Charles Njapa; Assi Rahbani; Mansour Rahbani	Quadwoofer; Sheffmade	1:55
13.	"Hitler Ye Jesus"			2:06
14.	"Jared"		Dean Durkin	2:54
15.	"Nitrous"			1:37
Total length:				30:11

Notes

- "Heil Hitler" was later renamed to "Hallelujah" with alternate lyrics.
- "Gas Chambers" was later reworked and released as "All the Love" on the album Bully.

Sample credits

- "Dirty Magazines" contains a sample of "Fugue in G Minor, BWV 578", as composed by Johann Sebastian Bach.
- "Jesus" contains a direct sample of "God", as written and performed by John Lennon.
- "Cousins" contains samples of "There Were Originals", as written and performed by Double Virgo; and elements "10 Percs", written by Davion Blessing and Osayuki Asemota, as performed by Dave Blunts.
- "Heil Hitler" contains a sample of a 1936 speech by Adolf Hitler.
- "Gas Chambers" contains samples of "Fayek Alaya", written by brothers Assi and Mansour Rahbani, as performed by Fairuz.
- "Jared" contains samples of an Instagram live by Justin Bieber.
- "Nitrous" contains samples of "100% of Dissin' You" by Armando.

== Credits and personnel ==
=== Music ===
- Ye – vocals (1–4, 6–15), production (1, 7),
- Quadwoofer – production (1–2, 11–12),
- Sheffmade – production (1–2, 11–12),
- Templecitygrounds (G06 Beatz, Theevoni, Fvbii) – production (1)
- Dave Blunts – vocals (6)
- Chuki Beats – production (7)
- Digital Nas – production (7)
- Hooligans – additional vocals (11)
- Dean Durkin – production (14)

=== Technical ===
- Rasta Tahj – recording (11)
- Nkenge 1x – recording, mixing, mastering (12)
