= WW3 (song) =

2025 single by Kanye West

Single by Ye
- Released: March 26, 2025
- Recorded: March 2025
- Genre: Hip-hop; jerk; trap
- Length: 1:43
- Label: YZY
- Songwriters: Dave Blunts; James Price
- Producers: Ye; Sheffmade

Kanye West singles chronology
"Wheels Fall Off" (2025)	"WW3" (2025)	"Cousins" (2025)

"WW3" is a song by the American rapper Kanye West. It was released on March 26, 2025, as the intended lead single from his unreleased studio album, Cuck. Written by American rapper Dave Blunts, the song was produced by West, 1srael, Quadwoofer, Sheffmade, and South Korean production trio Templecitygrounds. It samples "I Get High (On Your Memory)" by Freda Payne. A hip-hop song, it features raps from West about his controversies and antisemitism.

West first previewed "WW3" on March 15. It was incorrectly reported as being part of an update to his twelfth studio album, Bully (2026), which had been released that same month as an unfinished demo. The track was later confirmed to be part of Cuck during a livestream with media personality DJ Akademiks, who announced the album under the title of WW3. The song's music video was premiered at the end of West's interview with DJ Akademiks on March 30, and was later posted to West's Twitter account. It was later removed from all streaming services on November 17, 2025, after West expressed remorse for his antisemitic statements.

== Background ==
Prior to the release of "WW3," West released Bully V1, the demo version of his then-upcoming twelfth studio album, Bully (2026). This came after West announced that he wanted to cease his usage of artificial intelligence in his music. On March 15, 2025, he posted an image of a red swastika, stating that it was the cover art for his new album, as well as a logo using the SS insignia of the Schutzstaffel for his group Sunday Service Choir. Afterwards, he posted to X that that his new sound would be called "antisemetic [sic]."

"WW3" was first previewed by West via X on March 15, where he uploaded two versions, being one with and one without drums. Both versions of the song were later deleted from his account. As he had yet to announce Cuck, many believed it was part of an update to Bully, and West's fans referred to the track as either "Rari" or "Nazi" before the official name was revealed. During a show in April, Dave Blunts performed the song, including an unreleased verse by him meant to feature on the album version.

== Composition and lyrics ==
"WW3"
A 24-second sample of "WW3" with multiple references regarding his antisemitism and personal life, notoriously with the line "But how am I acting like Hitler, when I am a fucking nigger?"

A hip-hop song, "WW3" contains prominent samples of the Freda Payne song "I Get High (On Your Memory)". West begins the song by repeating the phrase "She wanna hop in a 'Rari." He also references his various controversies regarding antisemitism, reveals that he voted for Donald Trump over Joe Biden in the 2020 United States presidential election (which West himself ran in as an independent candidate), and questions those who went with convicted sex offender Jeffrey Epstein to his private island, Little Saint James. West mentions his recreational use of nitrous oxide, a 2020 video of him urinating on a Grammy award, him "rocking swastikas 'cause all my niggas Nazis," and that he reads two chapters of Hitler's manifesto Mein Kampf before going to bed.

== Release and reception ==
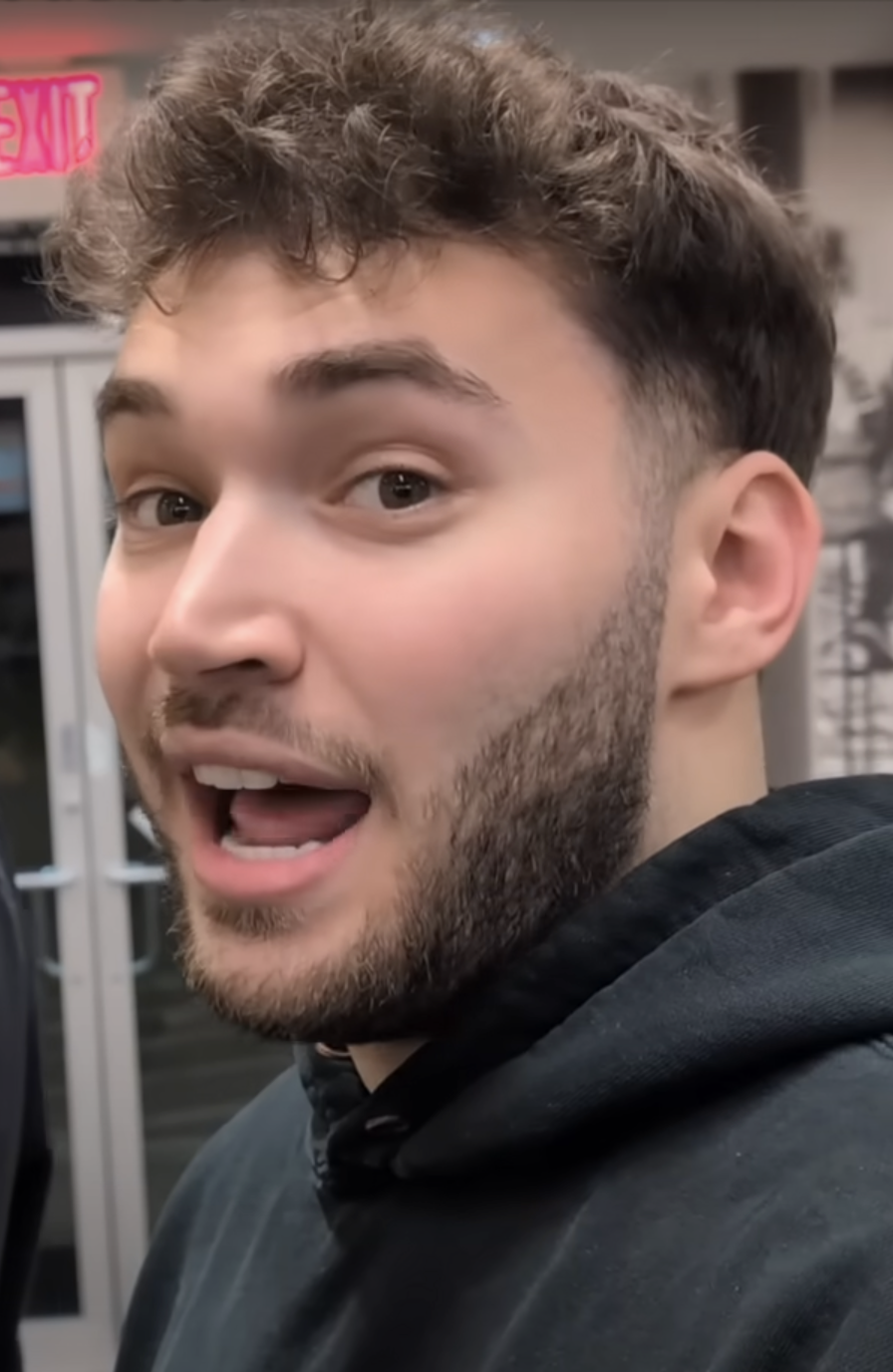
American streamer Adin Ross started out as a critic of "WW3", but gave it positive reception in a subsequent livestream.

"WW3" was released onto music streaming services on March 26, 2025, under West's YZY record label. The song's writing was credited to West on streaming, although he later confirmed that the lyrics were fully written by Blunts. In an interview after its release, co-producer Sheffmade said that he "really like[d]" the song, calling it "iconic" and attributing its viral spread to both its lyrics and production. Commercially, it charted at 37 on the New Zealand Hot Singles chart, and reached number one on multiple Spotify viral charts, with music outlets noting its presence on Germany and Israel's charts due to the song's antisemitic content.

"WW3" was met with widespread condemnation due to its lyrical content, with Complex's Joe Price referring to its lyrics as "atrocious." Paul Thompson of GQ called it "a hyper-literal exercise in doubling down on [West's] recent public comments", likening the song to "a near-perfect distillation of this moment in America: unfathomably dumb, proudly evil, but above all else, crushingly desperate." "WW3" drew confusion from Jewish American streamer Adin Ross, who expressed shock at the song and suggested that West's friends needed to "Baker Act" him for a "mental check"; Ross subsequently gave a more positive reaction on a later stream with Kodak Black, which West thanked him for on Twitter.

On May 22, West tweeted that he was "done with antisemitism." That day, "WW3" was reuploaded with the words "antisemitic", "Hitler", "Mein Kampf", "Nazis", and "swastikas" censored. Three months later on August 29, the Berlin district of Steglitz-Zehlendorf announced that it intended to blacklist "WW3" alongside the single "Heil Hitler", claiming that the German Cultural Affairs Committee had already passed a motion to add the songs to the index of media harmful to children maintained by the Federal Agency for Child and Youth Protection in the Media. Items placed on the list can not be sold or accessed by minors, and are subject to restrictions when bought by adults. On November 17, the song was removed from all streaming services alongside the Cuck singles "Hit Symphony" and "Hallelujah" following West's meeting with Orthodox rabbi Yoshiyahu Yosef Pinto to apologize for his antisemitic statements. Fellow single "Cousins" was subsequently removed on November 24.

== Music video ==
West debuted the music video for "WW3" at the end of his interview with DJ Akademiks on March 30, 2025. The following day, he released the video to his Twitter account. It contains repurposed material from the TV miniseries Roots (1977), as well as a montage of stills from interracial pornography and footage of a KKK gathering. The video ends on a shot of a burning cross.

== Personnel ==
Credits are adapted from various sources.

- Ye – vocals, production
- Dave Blunts – songwriting, lyricist
- James Price (Sheffmade) – songwriting, production

== Charts ==
Chart performance for "WW3"
Chart (2025)	Peak position
New Zealand Hot Singles (RMNZ)	37
