= Bianca (song) =

Unreleased song by Kanye West

Song by Kanye West

from the album Cuck
- Recorded: March–April 2025
- Genre: Chipmunk soul
- Length: 1:55
- Lyricist: Dave Blunts

"Bianca" (stylized in all caps) is an unreleased song by the American rapper Kanye West from his unreleased studio album, Cuck. It features uncredited vocals from fellow American rapper Dave Blunts, who also wrote the lyrics. West previewed the song during a livestream with media personality DJ Akademiks on April 2, 2025, where he also announced the album. "Bianca" features chipmunk soul production and high-pitched vocals, with West pleading for his wife Bianca Censori to return home after allegedly leaving him due to Tweets he made in early 2025. West raps about tracking Censori's location on the Maybach app and compares their relationship to that of Sean "Diddy" Combs and Cassie Ventura, which drew condemnation from online publications.

== Background ==
Kanye West announced the album Cuck (then known as WW3) during a livestream with media personality DJ Akademiks on April 2, 2025, where he showed a track listing that included "Bianca" as the fifth track. The song was previewed by West on the stream, causing rumors that he and his wife Bianca Censori had divorced to continue spreading after Yeezy representative Milo Yiannopoulos repeatedly denied them in February 2025. West's preview received mixed reviews from publications; Jazmin Toliver of HuffPost described the song as "unhinged" and "disturbing", a sentiment shared by The Mirror US editors Jamie Roberts and Scarlett O'Toole in regards to West's "Cassie and Diddy" comparison, though they considered his plea for Censori to "come back" to be "heartfelt". West and Censori were later seen together at a dinner in Spain on April 18, which was interpreted as confirmation that their split was temporary.

An older version of "Bianca", played during a livestream on May 4, 2025, featured Jersey club-inspired production and the alternate line "I'm taking my focus off Diddy", which West later replaced with "I guess we the new Cassie and Diddy". The song was included on a copy of Cuck that leaked on May 18, which leaked as a form of protest against West's antisemitic remarks.

== Composition and lyrics ==
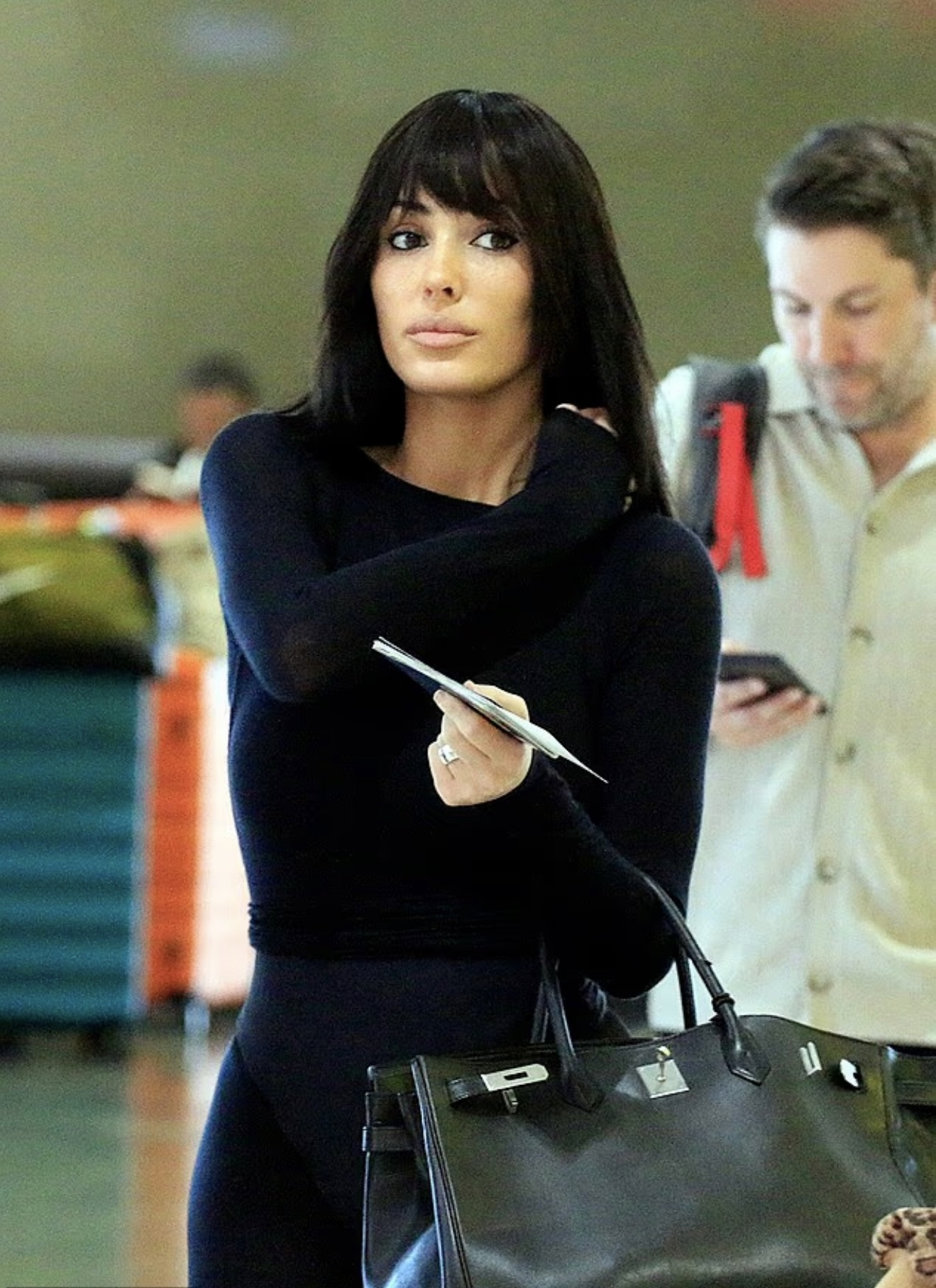
Dave Blunts wrote "Bianca" about West's wife Censori (pictured), who allegedly left West for a period due to statements he made in early 2025.

Musically, "Bianca" consists of a looped, pitched-up soul sample, similar to the chipmunk soul style of hip-hop production that West helped popularize. West's vocals are similarly high-pitched, featuring Auto-Tune and distortion, and he sings in a "distressed" and "warbled" tone. It follows a simple chorus-verse-chorus form with a runtime of one minute and fifty-five seconds.

The lyrics to "Bianca" were written by American rapper Dave Blunts, who West credited as the sole songwriter for every song on Cuck. It opens with a chorus where West begs for Censori to "come back" to him. In the verse's opening line, West alleges that she wanted him institutionalized at a psychiatric hospital before she "ran away" from him. Blunts follows this with a line from West's perspective, rapping that he is "not sick" and should not be admitted. West describes Censori driving away in Maybach after suffering a "panic attack" from his erratic tweeting, tracking her location through the car's app, and refusing to sleep until she returned home, which he later states is because she does not "understand" the situation. He compares this dynamic to the relationship between Sean "Diddy" Combs and Cassie Ventura, proclaiming them as the "new Cassie and Diddy"; Ventura had claimed in a November 2023 lawsuit that Combs subjected her to "years" of physical assault and rape. West says he sometimes hates "being famous" before alleging that people want to kill him, a sentiment he previously directed at former affiliate Jay-Z during a February 2025 rant on X. The song ends with a repetition of the chorus.
