= Tired of Being Groomed =

2025 song by Dave Blunts

Song by Dave Blunts
- Released: September 17, 2025 (leak)
- Recorded: September 16, 2025
- Genre: Trap
- Length: 3:38
- Label: Listen to the Kids
- Songwriters: Davion Blessing; Dilip Venkatesh; Amin Elamin
- Producers: Dilip; Menoh

"Tired of Being Groomed" is an unreleased song by American rapper Dave Blunts. It was produced by Dilip and co-produced by Menoh. In the song, Blunts disses American rapper Kanye West, who he formerly collaborated with on writing for West's unreleased studio album, Cuck.

== Background ==
The song first surfaced on September 16, 2025, when a snippet of the song was previewed on social media and the song's creation was showcased.

A few days before on September 12, Blunts took to his Instagram story to post his DMs with West, where Blunts wrote, "Ye, I can no longer continue to work on this album im going on my own journey and it does not align with what you want me to do I appreciate the opportunity but respectfully I'm out." Following the message, Ye responded with "Ok thank you. What are the parts that didn't align." To which Blunts responded to him with "You are very lost. Please find god." Following these chain of DMs, Blunts further clarified on his Instagram Stories that he's officially done with the rapper, with him writing, "Stop asking me about YE music I don't work w dude anymore I'm on my own path!"

== Composition and lyrics ==
On the track, Blunts attacks Kanye West, accusing him of inappropriate mentorship. He also highlights West's past antisemitic remarks, and mocks his acts of incest towards his cousin, which was mentioned on his track "Cousins". In addition to his attacks against Kanye West, Blunts also apologizes for spreading Jewish hate, including writing Kanye West's song "Heil Hitler".
