= Bianca (disambiguation) =

Bianca is a given name.

Bianca may also refer to:

== Bodies in outer space ==
- Bianca (moon), one of the moons of Uranus
- 218 Bianca, an asteroid

== Arts and entertainment ==
- Bianca (1984 film), by Italian director Nanni Moretti
- Bianca (1913 film), a silent film starring Patricia Palmer
- Bianca (opera), a 1918 one-act opera by Henry Kimball Hadley
- Bianca – Wege zum Glück, the first German telenovela (2004–2005)
- "Bianca" (song), an unreleased song by Kanye West

== People with the surname ==
- Sondra Bianca (born 1930), American concert pianist
- Stefano Bianca, Swiss architectural historian and urban designer
- Viva Bianca (born 1983), Australian actress

== Other uses ==
- bianca.com, the first web-based chat room
- Bianca (grape), a Hungarian wine grape

== See also ==
- Bianca 27, a Danish built sailboat
- Bianco, a resort town in Italy
- MV Bianca C., a passenger ship built in 1944 that sank twice
- Sol Bianca, an anime OVA series
