= Cousins (Kanye West song) =

2025 single by Kanye West

- A cropped version of Leda and the Swan by Paul Mathias Padua is used as the cover art for "Cousins"

Single by Ye
- Released: April 23, 2025
- Recorded: March–April 2025
- Genre: Hip-hop
- Length: 2:31
- Label: YZY
- Songwriters: Ye; Dave Blunts; James Price; Jezmi Tarik Fehmi; Osayuki Asemota; Sam Fenton
- Lyricist: Dave Blunts
- Producers: Ye; Chuki Beats; Digital Nas

Kanye West singles chronology
"WW3" (2025)	"Cousins" (2025)	"Heil Hitler" (2025)

"Cousins" (stylized in all caps) is a song by the American rapper Kanye West. It was released on April 21, 2025, as the intended second single from his unreleased studio album, Cuck. It was first released on West's Twitter account before being sent to streaming platforms on April 23. (Note: Despite this, platforms such as Apple Music list the single as being released on April 21.) A hip-hop song, it samples "Were There Originals" by Double Virgo and interpolates "10 Percs" by Dave Blunts; as such, Chuki Beats and both members of Double Virgo were later credited as songwriters. Blunts wrote the song's lyrics after West told him about an incestuous relationship he had with his male cousin when they were both children. He was originally reluctant to write it, but has since reflected on how it positively impacted West. It was removed from streaming platforms in November 2025.

== Background and recording ==
West has previously spoken of a cousin who is currently serving a life sentence in jail for a murder he committed at 17 years old. He has mentioned him on Jimmy Kimmel Live! in 2018 and in the 2020 documentary Kim Kardashian West: The Justice Project.

In an X post made alongside the initial release of "Cousins", West stated that he and his cousin had engaged in an incestuous relationship as children, starting when his cousin was six and lasting until West was 14. He added that his cousin is now serving a life sentence for killing a pregnant woman "a few years after [West] told him [they] wouldn't 'look at dirty magazines together' anymore." West believed he was "self-centered" for taking the blame for his cousin's murder charge and for "[showing] him those dirty magazines when he was 6."

American rapper Dave Blunts, who served as the main songwriter for Cuck, was first told about the incident while West was playing The Last of Us on his PlayStation 5. West originally declined Blunts's offer to turn it into a song but later changed his mind, though Blunts had become reluctant to write it, attempting to procrastinate by sending West different songs for the album. He eventually decided to record it as a demo in his living room due to West's persistence, writing it over a beat he downloaded from YouTube due to his main producers being asleep. Blunts took around 20 minutes to finish the song. He later reflected on "Cousins" as being "very freeing" for West when he made it, believing that West chose him to write it due to his "blunt" approach to songwriting that lacks double entendres. According to producer Chuki Beats, he was unaware that West used elements of Blunts's song "10 Percs", which he co-wrote and produced, until a YouTube commenter told him about the X post.

== Composition and lyrics ==
"Cousins"
The first chorus of "Cousins", where West details a childhood incestuous relationship with a cousin

In the song's lyrics, West details an alleged incestuous relationship he had with a male cousin that began after the two discovered homoerotic "dirty magazines" in his mother's closet. Unaware of its sexual implications, they started "reenacting everything that [they] had seen", coming to the song's climax where West realizes that he "gave [his] cousin head." He tries to hide his relationship with his cousin, instructing him to "tell nobody" and that those around him will judge him for the experience. The few friends aware of the incest tell West to "take it to [his] grave." West fears how people would view his sexuality as a result of his relationship, stating that people don't understand he's "not attracted to a man." A sample of "New Tank" by Playboi Carti transitions into the second half of the song, which uses altered lyrics from Blunts's song "10 Percs" to change its theme towards West's public addiction to nitrous oxide and relationship with Bianca Censori. West's interpolation of the song is done via an artificial intelligence-generated audio deepfake of his voice over Blunts's original recording.

== Release and legacy ==
On April 23, West posted four possible covers for the streaming release of "Cousins", asking fans which cover they "liked the best." The swan cover art, which was featured as the third option counterclockwise, was ultimately chosen. West posted a text message between him and Buster Ross, the director of A&R at distribution label Too Lost, who approved of the cover art. West reaffirmed that this meant the song would be released on digital streaming platforms, and it was later made available that same day. Shortly after the song's release, Blunts performed "Cousins" as the opener of his Standing for What I Believe In tour. Eminem referenced the song in his appearance on "Animals (Pt. 1)" by JID, rapping the line, "With these magazines, I act out like Ye and his cousin." On November 24, 2025, West removed "Cousins" from streaming platforms following the removal of singles "WW3" and "Hallelujah", though the music video briefly remained on Apple Music.

== Artwork ==
The cover art for "Cousins" is a cropped version of Paul Mathias Padua's painting Leda and the Swan, based on the Greek myth of the same name. Padua exhibited the painting in 1939 at the Haus der Kunst in Munich, which was personally requested by Adolf Hitler after the painting's nudity became controversial among the German public. Martin Bormann, Hitler's private secretary, later bought the painting and gifted it to Hitler, who subsequently hung it in one of his bedrooms at his Obersalzberg retreat. Critics have interpreted West's decision to use a painting owned by Hitler as intentional, citing his previous praise of Hitler and the original artwork for West and Ty Dolla Sign's debut collaborative album, Vultures 1 (2024), which adapted a piece by landscape painter Caspar David Friedrich; Friedrich was one of Hitler's favorite artists, and his art was used to promote Nazi ideology throughout the 1930s.

== Music video ==
The music video for "Cousins" was noted for its low quality visuals and sexual themes. Pictured is a scene where a woman sings the lyric "I gave my cousin head" while swastikas censor her nipples.

The music video for "Cousins" was released alongside West's Twitter post. The initial upload was done in low quality, though a higher quality version was later added to Apple Music with the single. Its visuals are taken from several sources, including home media, TV commercials, animations, and pornography, with Cristina Zavala of Los 40 describing the video as "disconnected" and "mix[ing] violence and sex." Scenes include a burning cross, a sign reading "4 faggots", gun violence, and a woman with swastikas censoring her nipples.

== Personnel ==
Credits are adapted from ASCAP, HotNewHipHop, and the BMI Repertoire. (Note: Find additional credits for the song on the BMI Repertoire by searching the work number #76510469.)

- Ye – lead vocals, songwriter, producer
- Dave Blunts – songwriter, lyricist
- Digital Nas – producer
- Osayuki Asemota (Chuki Beats) – songwriter, producer
- James Price (Sheffmade) – songwriter
- Jezmi Tarik Fehmi – songwriter
- Sam Fenton – songwriter

== Charts ==
Chart performance for "Cousins"
Chart (2025)	Peak position
New Zealand Hot Singles (RMNZ)	21

== See also ==
- Child sexuality
