= Heil Hitler (song) =

2025 single by Kanye West

- Cover used for the original single release and "The Heil Symphony", based on the Nazi flag. Later releases use pitch black cover art.

Single by Ye
- B-side: "Heil Hitler" (Top 5 Version); "Nigga Heil Hitler"
- Released: May 8, 2025
- Recorded: March–May 2025
- Length: 2:31
- Label: YZY
- Songwriters: Dave Blunts; James Price
- Producers: Quadwoofer; Sheffmade

Kanye West singles chronology
"Cousins" (2025)	"Heil Hitler" (2025)	"Alive" (2025)

Audio sample
- First four lines of the chorus to "Heil Hitler", wherein West makes note of his tweets and people's reception of them: file; help

"Heil Hitler" is a song by the American rapper Kanye West. It was self-released on May 8, 2025, as the third single from his unreleased studio album, Cuck. It was written by American rapper Dave Blunts and produced by Quadwoofer and Sheffmade, while West's group the Hooligans provide additional vocals. In "Heil Hitler", West claims his custody battle and the freezing of his assets caused him to turn to Nazism, and the chorus features him and the Hooligans chanting "nigga, heil Hitler" against a synth-heavy, orchestral instrumental.

"Heil Hitler" was panned by critics, and drew outrage and condemnation due to its antisemitism and praise of Adolf Hitler. It was banned from all major digital streaming platforms and in Germany due to Germany's laws against extremist symbolism and hate speech, but went viral on social media, with West's X upload receiving over 6.5 million views within two days. In July, Australia revoked West's travel visa in reaction.

West released "Heil Hitler" in altered forms to circumvent censorship. An instrumental version, "The Heil Symphony" (later "Hit Symphony"), was uploaded in its place on May 14. After announcing that he was "done with antisemitism", West released "Hallelujah", an alternate version of "Heil Hitler" that replaces its references to Nazism with lyrics relating to Christianity, on May 31. After West met with the Orthodox rabbi Yoshiyahu Yosef Pinto to apologize in November 2025, YZY began issuing copyright strikes on reuploads of "Heil Hitler".

== Background ==
In February 2025, Kanye West met American rapper Dave Blunts through the latter's touring agent, and they began collaborating. Blunts had previously been credited as the sole writer to all of Cuck's songs, including the singles "WW3" and "Cousins". Speaking about "Heil Hitler" in a June 2025 interview, Blunts said that he understood people's frustrations with its lyrics, jokingly comparing his involvement in its writing to J. Robert Oppenheimer's creation of the atomic bomb. Despite this, he defended the track, stating that, "everybody acts like they don't like [it]. It's a good fucking song. The beat was pretty good."

Before its release, "Heil Hitler" was featured on the track listing revealed by media personality DJ Akademiks on April 2, 2025. The song was played multiple times during livestreams by West in the following month, showcasing progress on the development of Cuck. Notably, earlier versions of the song contain a line aimed at fellow rapper Drake: "Niggas be acting like faggots so much, I think they might be Drake." Digital Nas, who worked on the track, said it was the "song of the year".

== Composition ==
Musically, "Heil Hitler" features a synth-heavy and orchestral instrumental, with marching band-style coming in during the bridge. For the hook, West and his group the Hooligans chant "All my niggas Nazis, nigga, heil Hitler." West's first verse details the current state of his life, including his custody battle and the freezing of his assets, using them as justification for why he "became a Nazi". The song ends with a sample taken from a 1936 Adolf Hitler speech. The speech is in German, and translates to:

"If you consider the work I'm doing to be right, if you think I have been diligent, that I have worked, that I have advocated for you this year, that I have spent my time honestly in the service of my people, then cast your vote! If so, then stand up for me like I have stood up for you!"

=== Alternate versions ===
"The Heil Symphony"
A 24-second sample of "The Heil Symphony", rearranging "Heil Hitler" into a solely orchestral song.

An edited version of the song's instrumental, "The Heil Symphony" or "Hit Symphony", replaced the original version on most streaming services. Released to Scrybe earlier in the day, this version removes the vocals and drums – the former being the reason for the song's deletion – and further emphasizes its orchestral elements. This version was also taken down by Spotify, leading West to re-upload the song with a black single cover and the updated name "Hit Symphony".

After previously stating he was "done with antisemitism", West released a new version of "Heil Hitler" titled "Hallelujah", replacing the mentions of Hitler with lyrics relating to Christianity, including removing the speech.

== Release and aftermath ==
West released "Heil Hitler" via a music video posted to his X account on May 8, 2025. The video depicts an empty warehouse of Black men standing in militaristic formation, draped in animal skins and mimicking lines done by the Hooligans. However, it has been removed from streaming platforms such as Apple Music, Spotify, and YouTube. West has stated that the song was "banned by all digital streaming platforms". Spokespeople for Reddit and YouTube told NBC News that the platforms were working to remove uploads of the song and posts promoting it. Social media platforms Instagram and Facebook, both owned by Meta Platforms, retained posts with the song.

The music video for the song is restricted and unviewable in Germany. Strafgesetzbuch section 86a bans the dissemination of Nazi symbols, punishable with up to three years in prison or a fine.

The Jerusalem Post noted that May 8, the day of the release, was Victory in Europe Day, marking the end of World War II in Europe.

Around November 6, 2025, YZY began issuing copyright strikes on YouTube against videos that contained "Heil Hitler", after West met with the Orthodox rabbi Yoshiyahu Yosef Pinto and apologized for his statements. On November 17, 2025, "Hallelujah" and "Hit Symphony" were removed from streaming platforms. A video of far-right influencers, including Nick Fuentes, Clavicular, Sneako, Myron Gaines, and Andrew Tate, singing along to "Heil Hitler" at the Miami Beach nightclub Vendôme circulated online in January 2026. Vendôme apologized and reportedly banned the men from the club. Miami Beach mayor Steven Meiner condemned the incident on social networking service X (formerly known as Twitter), explaining that he was "deeply disturbed and disgusted." The Auschwitz Jewish Center Foundation condemned both the song's use and the behavior accompanying it. Music Times reported that West was infuriated by the incident, as he had been attempting to repair his image since the meeting with Pinto. "Heil Hitler" was re-uploaded to West's YouTube channel without his knowledge on July 26, 2026, following unofficial uploads of unreleased or fake music appearing on several other artist's YouTube and Apple Music accounts.

== Critical reception ==
The song was panned by critics, including outrage and condemnation due to its embrace of antisemitism and praise of Adolf Hitler.

Journalist Jonathan Sacerdoti from The Spectator described the lyrical content of "Heil Hitler" as "a crude litany of racial epithets, Nazi slogans, and sexual bragging". He disagreed with supporters who argued that the song is "an effort to 'confront' taboo or 'reclaim' pain", describing it as representative of "the collapse of cultural seriousness, the triumph of provocation over principle, and the ascendance of a cult that trades in attention as currency, heedless of the cost to our collective dignity." The song went viral on social media; West's X upload received over 6.5 million views by May 10, while six YouTube uploads collectively received hundreds of thousands of views. NBC News wrote that "The continued spread of the song and the varying approaches to moderation exemplify an increasingly fractured environment online and on social media."

Some publications argued that censorship of the song may increase its popularity, as well as infringe on freedom of speech, a sentiment echoed by public figures such as Joe Rogan and Russell Brand. In July 2025, the Australian Department of Home Affairs revoked West's travel visa due to the song's promotion of Nazism. West had previously faced the possibility of being denied entry in 2023, as Minister for Education Jason Clare suggested banning him from Australia due to several antisemitic comments he made in October 2022.

== Track listing ==
- SoundCloud release (May 8)
1. "Heil Hitler" – 2:31
2. "Heil Hitler" (Top 5 Version) – 1:49
- Scrybe release (May 9)
1. "Heil Hitler" – 1:49
2. "Nigga Heil Hitler" – 2:35
- All platforms (May 14)
1. "The Heil Symphony" – 1:16
- All platforms (May 21)
1. "Hit Symphony" – 1:16
- All platforms (May 31)
1. "Hallelujah" – 2:18

=== Notes ===
- All tracks are stylized in all caps.
- The "Top 5 Version" is a remix based on an earlier version of the song played to Top5 on the streaming platform Parti, which was nicknamed the "Top5 version" by fans prior to the song's release.
- The Scrybe release misnames multiple mixes of the song.
  - "Heil Hitler" is the Top 5 Version.
  - "Nigga Heil Hitler" is the music video edit.
- "The Heil Symphony" and "Hit Symphony" are identical, simply renamed in favor for distributors.
- "Hallelujah" replaces the refrain with Christian-themed lyrics and removes the Hitler sample.

== Personnel ==
Credits are adapted from multiple sources.

- Ye – vocals
- Dave Blunts – songwriting, lyricist
- James Price (Sheffmade) – songwriting, production
- Quadwoofer – production
- Rasta Tahj – recording engineer
