= Digital Nas =

American record producer

- Digital Nas in 2019

Background information
- Also known as: DN
- Born: Nasir Harold Pemberton; December 5, 1998 (age 27); Atlanta, Georgia, U.S.
- Genres: Hip-hop; trap; R&B
- Occupations: Record producer; rapper; singer; songwriter
- Years active: 2013–present
- Label: III
- Website: digitalnas.com

Nasir Harold Pemberton (born December 5, 1998), known professionally as Digital Nas or DN, is an American hip-hop producer from Atlanta, Georgia. He first gained recognition for his production work for Lil Yachty, and later for his work with Kanye West on his albums Donda (2021) and Vultures 1 (2024), both of which debuted atop the Billboard 200. He returned to work with West on his eleventh studio album Donda 2 (2022) and on Cuck, which was ultimately shelved.

== Early life and career ==
Nasir Harold Pemberton was born on December 5, 1998, in Atlanta, Georgia. He did early work with Trippie Redd, Playboi Carti and Lil Yachty prior to their mainstream breakthroughs. After Pemberton had gained success, he began to work with major artists including ASAP Rocky and Kanye West.

In January 2016, he formed his own record label, III Records. Pemberton has also frequently collaborated with fellow Atlanta-based artist Bktherula and executively produced her 2020 mixtape Nirvana, on which he also guest performed.

In October 2026, Pemberton alleged that he had received no royalties or publishing from his work with Kanye West under his YZY deal. He had earlier reprimanded West for not crediting him on the Vultures 1 track "Carnival" when it was submitted for a Grammy nomination, which was due to the music executive Matt Geffen not being able to verify his involvement through other producers that worked on the album; Pemberton was later credited for the final nomination. He later apologized for his post regarding royalties, saying that he should have kept the situation private and was now sorting it out with West's team. By October 16, Pemberton had fully retracted his statements and claimed that West had actually paid him a "substantial amount for [his] contributions".

== Discography ==
=== Extended plays ===
- DN (2016)
- Throwaway Songs Worth Listening To (2019)
- DN 2.9 (2022)

=== Mixtapes ===
- DN 2 (2019)

=== Singles ===
- "No Safety" (2019)
- "False News" (2024)

=== Albums ===
- Tampering with Sound PKA DN3 (2025)

== Production discography ==
=== Studio albums ===
- Teenage Emotions – Lil Yachty (2017)
- Still Striving – ASAP Ferg (2017)
- A Love Letter to You 2 – Trippie Redd (2017)
- Bawskee – Comethazine (2018)
- Lil Boat 2 – Lil Yachty (2018)
- Nuthin' 2 Prove – Lil Yachty (2018)
- Mudboy – Sheck Wes (2018)
- Nirvana – Bktherula (2020)
- Love Black – Bktherula (2021)
- Donda – Kanye West (2021)
- Pink is Better – Token (2022)
- Crunkstar – Duke Deuce (2022)
- Donda 2 – Kanye West (2022)
- Vultures 1 – ¥$ (Kanye West & Ty Dolla Sign) (2024)
- Don't Be Dumb – ASAP Rocky (2026)
- Cuck – Kanye West (N/A)

=== Mixtapes ===
- Go Home – Chris Travis (2014)
- Project X – Xavier Wulf (2015)
- Lil Boat – Lil Yachty (2016)
- Wopavelli 2 – Lil Wop (2017)
- Wopavelli 3 – Lil Wop (2017)
- Wopavelli 4 – Lil Wop (2018)

=== Extended plays ===
- The Lost Files – Digital Nas & Lil Yachty (2016)
- The Lost Files 2 – Digital Nas & Lil Yachty (2019)

=== Singles ===
- "Southside" – Xavier Wulf FKA "Ethelwulf" featuring Chris Travis (2013)
- "Lil Boat" – Lil Yachty (2015)
- "Run It" – Playboi Carti featuring Lil Yachty (2015)
- "Mattress Remix" – ASAP Ferg featuring ASAP Rocky, Playboi Carti, Rich the Kid and Famous Dex (2017)
- "NBAYoungBoat" – Lil Yachty featuring YoungBoy Never Broke Again (2018)
- "Revenge" – Lil Yachty (2018)
- "Carnival" – ¥$ (Kanye West and Ty Dolla Sign) and Rich the Kid featuring Playboi Carti (2024)
- "Cousins" – Kanye West (2025)
- "Heil Hitler" – Kanye West (2025)

== Awards and nominations ==
Year	Award	Nominated work	Category	Result	Ref.
2022	Grammy Awards	Donda (Kanye West, as producer)	Album of the Year	Nominated	
2025	Grammy Awards	"Carnival" (¥$, as producer)	Best Rap Song	Nominated	
