= Views of Kanye West =

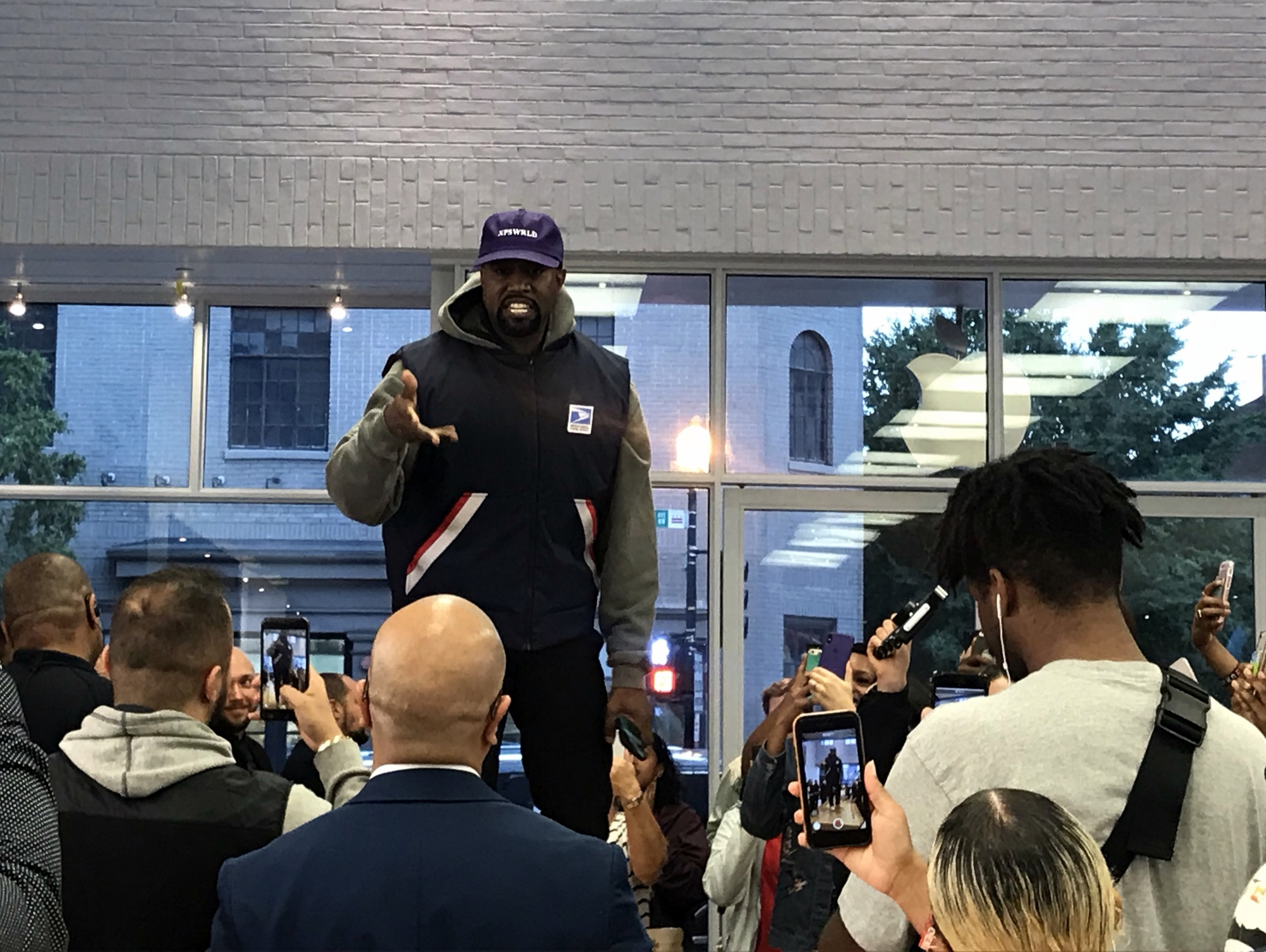
West in 2018, speaking to a crowd in Washington, D.C., about his meeting with President Donald Trump

American rapper Kanye West has received mainstream media attention for his outspoken views on numerous political and social issues. He donated to the political campaigns of Barack Obama in 2008 and 2012, and Hillary Clinton in 2016. From 2018 to 2020, West publicly endorsed Donald Trump on several occasions before launching his own presidential campaign in 2020, and supported Trump once more in 2024. West has met with Trump on several occasions, most recently dining with Trump and far-right political commentator Nick Fuentes in 2022. In his unsuccessful run for president of the United States in 2020, he espoused consistent life ethic and other Christian positions. His subsequent campaign in the 2024 election was active for several months in late 2022, although no formal paperwork was filed.

Beginning in 2018, West expressed opposition to abortion, capital punishment, welfare, and vaccines, and has expressed support towards gun rights, gay marriage, legalization of cannabis, and religious freedom. His views grew more radical following his divorce from Kim Kardashian. In December 2022, West said he admired Adolf Hitler, publicly denied the Holocaust, and identified as a Nazi in an interview with Alex Jones's Infowars. In a rant on Twitter in February 2025, West made antisemitic comments, praised Hitler, and defended rapper Sean Combs from sexual misconduct allegations. West initially claimed that his rant was a "social experiment", but later retracted his statement and reaffirmed his views. He has been widely condemned and lost many sponsors and partnerships. (Note: Attributed to multiple sources:) In May 2025, West stated he is "done with antisemitism".

In January 2026, West published an open letter ad in The Wall Street Journal titled "To Those I've Hurt", stating that due to his prior incident in 2002 involving a car crash he had developed Bipolar I disorder. This allegedly led West over the years to a steady decline in his mental state leading him to "gravitate toward the worst symbol he could find, the swastika". He has apologized to Jewish and Black people, committing to therapy and "accountability".

== Social issues ==
=== Abortion ===
In October 2019, West (then a devout Evangelical Christian) spoke out against abortion, citing his belief in the Sixth Commandment; "thou shalt not kill". In an October 2022 interview with Tucker Carlson, Kanye West stated that he is anti-abortion, claiming that "there are more Black babies being aborted than born in New York City at this point. That 50% of Black death in America is abortion". That same month, he repeated these claims on a podcast with Lex Fridman, saying that "Fifty percent today of ... Black people's deaths today is abortion.... It's not racism; that's too wide of a term. It's genocide and population control that Black people are in today in America, that is promoted by the music and the media that Black people make, that Jewish record labels get paid off of".

=== Death penalty ===
In 2020, West said he was against capital punishment.

=== LGBTQ rights ===
West has spoken in support of gay marriage early in his career. In a 2005 MTV News interview with Sway Calloway, West spoke out against homophobia in hip hop music, stating that "everybody in hip-hop discriminates against gay people." Further reflecting on the issue, he used to use "gay" as an insult, but later changed after meeting his cousin's male partner, stating: "Yo, this is my cousin, I love him. I've been discriminating against gays. Do I discriminate against my cousin?" In July 2015, he met Caitlyn Jenner for the first time, also helping the Kardashian family accept her transition as a trans woman.

Later, his views shifted to a more conservative approach. In a 2022 interview for Censored.TV with Gavin McInnes, West stated: "You know, the thing about that, 95 percent of gay people don't get married anyway. So it's a very liberal thing that is put up to like cause these headlines. All my policies are gonna follow the Bible." In April 2025, West tweeted multiple controversial posts about transgender people, posting that his "dick to ^{[sic]} long for trans pussy" and that "You start dating a trans women ^{[sic]} and wondering why y'all got so many things in common."

=== Mental health ===
West was diagnosed with bipolar disorder in 2016. His eighth studio album Ye (2018) discussed his struggles with mental health, including the diagnosis, and its cover art contains the statement "I hate being Bi-Polar, it's awesome". In December 2018, West said that he stopped taking bipolar medication six months prior as he believed it was negatively impacting the quality of his musical output, declaring that he could not have made his albums My Beautiful Dark Twisted Fantasy and Watch the Throne while medicated.

In a 2022 interview with record executive Wack 100, West alleged that his previous diagnosis of having bipolar disorder was a misdiagnosis from a Jewish doctor, believing that he is "more autistic than bipolar." In a 2025 interview with Justin Laboy, West stated that he had been formally diagnosed with autism at the suggestion of his wife.

=== Books ===
Although West has written several books, he has shown aversion to books and the act of reading. During a 2022 episode of Alo Yoga's "Alo Mind Full" podcast, West said that he "actually haven't read any book," adding on that "reading is like eating Brussels sprouts for me."

=== Religious freedom ===
West supports faith-based organizations and restoring school prayer in the United States.

=== Prison reform ===
In September 2018, West called for the alteration of the Thirteenth Amendment as it contained a loophole which suggested the legality of enslaving convicts. During a meeting with Trump the following month, West called the Thirteenth Amendment a "trap door".

In October 2019, West stated during a performance with the Sunday Service Choir that people were too busy discussing music and sports instead of focusing on a broken system that he claims imprisons "one in three African-Americans...in this country." The following month, West alleged that the media calls him "crazy" to silence his opinion, connecting this to the incarceration of African-Americans and celebrities.

On his album Jesus Is King (2019), West discussed the Thirteenth Amendment, mass incarceration, criticized the prison–industrial complex, and drew a connection between the three-strikes law and slavery.

=== Economics ===
In May 2018, West espoused the "Democratic plantation" theory that welfare is a tool used by the Democratic Party to keep black Americans as an underclass that remains reliant on the party. During a September 2018 special guest appearance on Saturday Night Live, after the show had already gone off the air, West alleged to the crowd that it was a Democratic Party plan "to take the fathers out [of] the home and promote welfare."

The following month, West alleged that homicide was a byproduct of a "welfare state" that destroyed black families. Jelani Cobb challenged West's claim in The New Yorker (at least as much as it applied to Chicago), arguing that "the catalysts for violence in that city predate the 'welfare state' and the rise of single-parent black households, in the nineteen-seventies." He pointed to findings from Chicago Commission on Race Relations regarding the violence of the Chicago race riots of 1919 and a 1945 study entitled Black Metropolis, published by sociologists St. Clair Drake and Horace Cayton, which Cobb wrote, "detailed the ways in which discrimination in housing and employment were negatively affecting black migrants." He also noted similar observations made by W. E. B. Du Bois in Philadelphia, in 1903.

=== Other ===
In September 2013, West was widely rebuked by human rights groups for performing in Kazakhstan for the wedding of authoritarian President Nursultan Nazarbayev's grandson. West was reportedly paid $3 million for his performance. West had previously participated in cultural boycotts, joining Shakira and Rage Against the Machine in refusing to perform in Arizona after the 2010 implementation of stop and search laws directed against potential illegal immigrants.

In October 2013, during an On Air with Ryan Seacrest interview, West explained what he thinks "female powers looks like" when he revealed Kim Kardashian's pitch for the cover of Vogue, challenging then-First Lady Michelle Obama to "post a sexy swimsuit photo."

In February 2016, West again became embroiled in controversy when he posted a tweet seemingly asserting Bill Cosby's innocence in the wake of over 50 women alleging he had sexually assaulted them.

West has made numerous statements against the COVID-19 vaccine.

West has supported legalization of cannabis in the United States.

When asked about the Israeli–Palestinian conflict in February 2024, after the start of the Gaza war (2023–present), West said he was not educated enough to comment. The following September, before starting a Vultures 2 listening event, he displayed a photograph of a Palestinian olive tree. The photograph was taken during the First Intifada (1987–1993), and the gesture was interpreted as West expressing solidarity with Palestinians. In May 2025, West tweeted "free Gaza" with a Palestinian flag emoji.

== Politics ==
In 2005, West appeared as a guest host during A Concert for Hurricane Relief, a benefit concert for the victims of Hurricane Katrina, alongside actor Mike Myers. West deviated from his script, criticizing the media's apparent disparity of the treatment of black victims as opposed to white victims of the devastating hurricane. He finished his speech by stating the now-infamous quote "George Bush doesn't care about black people", criticizing the United States' federal response to Katrina. He apologized for the comment in 2010, saying he "didn't have the grounds to call [Bush] a racist" and later stated in regard to the remark that he "was programmed to think from a victimized mentality".

Future president Barack Obama consulted with West during his 2008 presidential campaign, and West would perform at a Democratic National Committee party that August to support Obama's run for president, revealing on stage that he wished; "[his] momma could have seen this day". West would later post a portrait of Obama on his blog after his election win, with a message reading "HI MOM, OBAMA WON!". West performed alongside artists Fall Out Boy and Kid Rock at Obama's Youth Inaugural Ball in 2009, praising the newly inaugurated President Obama during his set.

In September 2012, West donated $1,000 to Barack Obama's re-election campaign, and in August 2015, he donated $2,700 to Hillary Clinton's 2016 campaign. He also donated $15,000 to the Democratic National Committee in October 2014.

In September 2015, West announced that he intended to run for President of the United States in 2020. Later that month, in an interview with Dirk Standen at West's Yeezy Season 2 show at New York Fashion Week, he spoke positively about Republican politician Ben Carson after a phone call with him. West later implied on Twitter that he intended to run for president in 2024 due to Donald Trump's win in the 2016 elections.

West later confirmed this in an interview in September 2018, saying that his main political concern is health care in the United States. On December 13, 2016, West met with President-elect Trump. According to West, "I wanted to meet with Trump today to discuss multicultural issues. These issues included bullying, supporting teachers, modernizing curriculums, and violence in Chicago. I feel it is important to have a direct line of communication with our future President if we truly want change."

West previously stated he would have voted for Trump had he voted. In February 2017, however, West deleted all his tweets about Trump in purported dislike of the new president's policies, particularly the travel ban. West reiterated his support for Donald Trump in April 2018 in a text to Ebro Darden where he said "I love Donald Trump ... I love Donald Trump." West also posted a picture wearing a Make America Great Again hat alongside a series of tweets defending President Trump. Trump later retweeted several of West's tweets.

Following his return to Twitter in April 2018, West tweeted "I love the way Candace Owens thinks." The tweet was met with controversy among some of West's fans.

In May 2018, West said in an interview with radio host Charlamagne tha God that he had been asked by a friend "What makes George Bush any more racist than Trump?". This was possibly alluding to his previous controversial condemnation of Bush as not caring about black people. West said "racism isn't the deal-breaker for me. If that was the case, I wouldn't live in America."

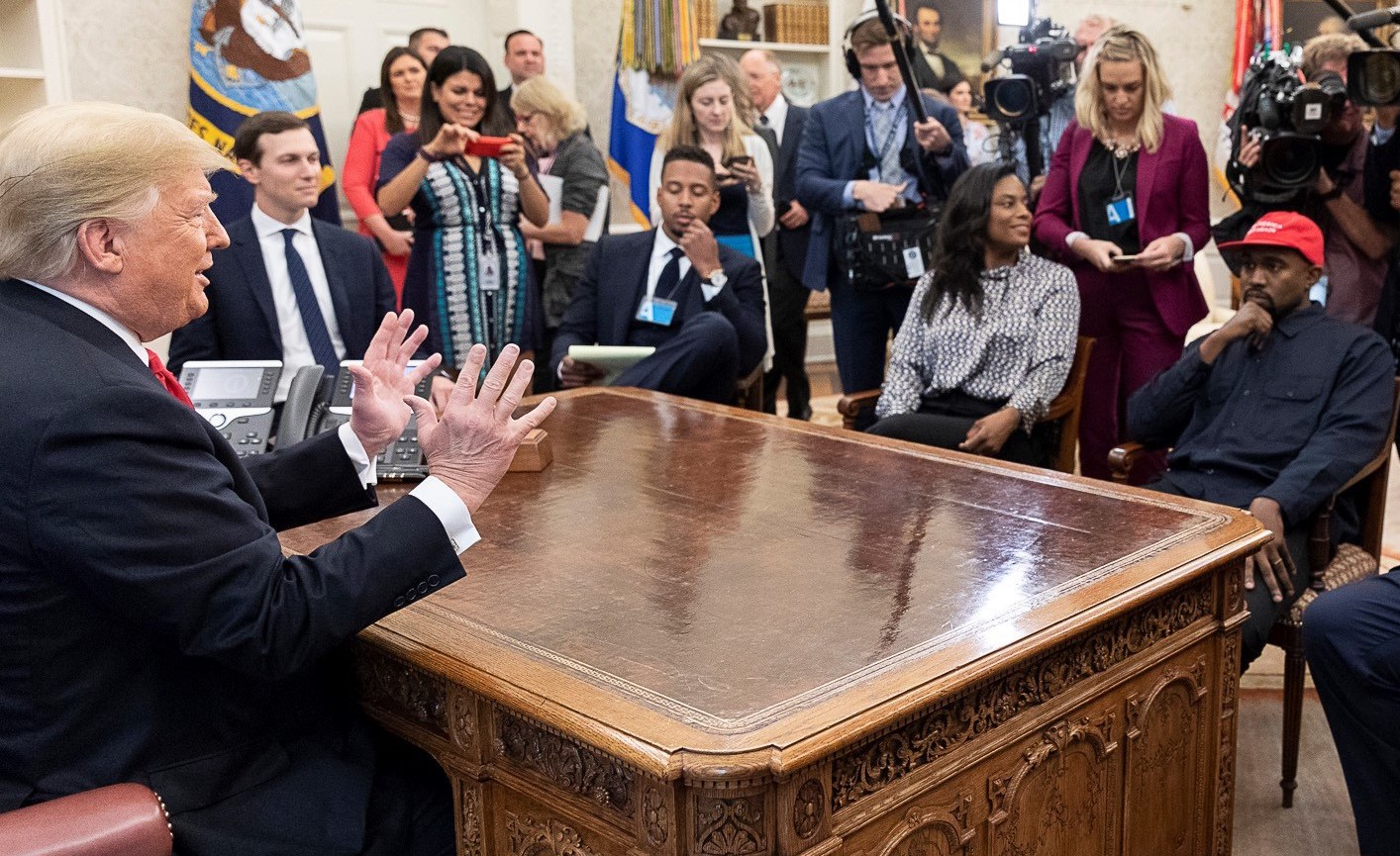
West (red cap) with President Donald Trump in the Oval Office in 2018

In the same interview, West expressed admiration for Bernie Sanders and his policies, saying "the Ye version [of a presidential campaign] would be the Trump campaign with maybe the Bernie Sanders principles. That would be my mix and stuff." In a 2020 interview with Nick Cannon, West revealed he wanted to meet with Joe Biden and Bernie Sanders, but was denied by Sanders.

On October 11, 2018, West visited the Oval Office for a meeting with President Trump to discuss a range of issues. He and several other musicians watched Trump sign the Music Modernization Act. Later in October 2018, West and his wife visited the pro-Trump president of Uganda, Yoweri Museveni, who said they held "fruitful discussions" about promoting tourism and the arts.

In 2018, West expressed support for gun rights, saying "the problem is illegal guns. Illegal guns is the problem, not legal guns. We have the right to bear arms". West's remarks received support from the National Rifle Association of America (NRA).

The same month, West donated $73,540 to progressive Chicago mayoral candidate Amara Enyia. The donation was the exact amount Enyia needed to pay a fine she received for not filing campaign finance reports during her abbreviated 2015 mayoral run.

Also in the same month, West was reported to have given his support to the Blexit movement, a campaign by Owens to encourage black Americans to abandon the Democratic Party and register as Republicans. Media reports suggested West had advised on the design of the campaign's logo, and branded merchandise, including T-shirts. However, West denied being the designer and disavowed the effort, tweeting "My eyes are now wide open and now realize I've been used to spread messages I don't believe in. I am distancing myself from politics and completely focusing on being creative !!!"

In 2019, West re-affirmed his support for Trump. That year, he expressed his opposition to abortion, and condemned those who wish to remove religion from the public square. In an interview with GQ in January 2020, West implied he would be voting for President Trump. Months later, West launched his own run for president and said in a subsequent interview that he was "taking off the Trump hat" due to Trump hiding in a bunker during the George Floyd protests. In September 2020, West expressed his support for Armenia during the Second Nagorno-Karabakh War. Also in that month, West met with the President of Haiti Jovenel Moïse and discussed land ownership in the country.

In December 2022, West urged his followers on Instagram to vote for Republican candidate Herschel Walker in the U.S. Senate runoff election in Georgia.

At least five presidents have condemned West for his statements and actions. George W. Bush criticized West for "calling him a racist". Jimmy Carter and Barack Obama condemned his actions following the 2009 MTV Video Music Awards, with Obama calling him a "jackass" during an interview. Donald Trump and Joe Biden (indirectly through a tweet) criticized West in 2022 after he praised the Nazis.

== Race relations ==
On the track "Never Let Me Down" from West's first studio album, The College Dropout (2004), West rapped about his grandfather's arrest after taking Donda, West's mother, after sitting at a "whites-only counter" in Chicago, when Donda was six, followed with the line: "Racism still alive we just be concealing it." "Two Words" and "Jesus Walks" contain references of police brutality, while "All Falls Down" is based on consumerism in the black community. West's second studio album, Late Registration (2005), further explores issues in the black community. "Crack Music" references the crack epidemic and criticizes U.S. former president Ronald Reagan and then-president George W. Bush.

In March 2013, during an interview with Clique TV, West considered racism to be a "dated concept" meant "to separate, to alienate, to pinpoint anything," metaphorically comparing it to two catch fighting over a bouncing ball. On his sixth studio album Yeezus (2013), West spoke against private prisons and mentions segregation on the track, "New Slaves", referencing the connection between the Drug Enforcement Association and CoreCivic. He further explored such themes in "Black Skinhead".

In October 2013, while on 97.1 AMP in Los Angeles, West explained that he sold merch themed with the Confederate flag on The Yeezus Tour in an attempt to re-appropriate it, claiming he took the flag and considered it his. "It's my flag now. Now what are you going to do?", he finished. In September 2016, in promotion of Yeezy Season 4, he tweeted a casting call for "multiracial women only".

In 2018, West criticized the Thirteenth Amendment, citing the provision allowing slavery as punishment for a crime. In May, West caused controversy when he said during an appearance on TMZ: "When you hear about slavery for 400 years ... for 400 years? That sounds like a choice. You were there for 400 years and it's all of y'all. It's like we're mentally imprisoned." West responded to the controversy on Twitter: "Of course I know that slaves did not get shackled and put on a boat by free will. My point is for us to have stayed in that position even though the numbers were on our side means that we were mentally enslaved" and "The reason why I brought up the 400 years point is that we can't be mentally imprisoned for another 400 years. We need free thought now. Even the statement was an example of free thought. It was just an idea. Once again I am being attacked for presenting new ideas." Later, on August 29, 2018, West offered up an emotional apology for his slavery comment during a radio interview with 107.5 WGCI Chicago.

In November 2016, West told black people to "stop focusing on racism", but clarified that his support for Trump did not mean he did not "believe in Black Lives Matter." In June 2020, West participated in the George Floyd protests and donated $2 million to help victims of the rioting that took place during demonstrations. He also paid off Floyd's daughter's college tuition. The following month, West stated that one of his priorities would be to end police brutality, adding that "[the] police are people too".

On October 3, 2022, during his Yeezy Season 9 fashion show in Paris, West wore a shirt with the script "White Lives Matter", a move described by Forbes as controversial. According to the Anti-Defamation League, the phrase is a white supremacist slogan that was created in response to Black Lives Matter protests against police brutality. Conservative commentator Candace Owens posed for a photo with West, while wearing a matching shirt with the slogan. Following the event, West posted a story on his Instagram, stating: "Everyone know that Black Lives Matter was a scam now it's over you're welcome."

== Antisemitism ==
=== Before 2022 ===
In October 2022, CNN reported, based on anonymous sources, that West had a "disturbing history of admiring" Nazi Germany and Adolf Hitler. Though West said in a September 2022 podcast he had not read any book, CNN reported he had read Hitler's manifesto Mein Kampf (1925). Rolling Stone reported that West's admiration of the Nazis and Hitler had been an open secret within the music industry for around two decades, and TheWrap found that West had made public statements employing antisemitic tropes since at least 2005. He has had a lengthy friendship with the Nation of Islam leader Louis Farrakhan, who has been described as an antisemite by the Anti-Defamation League (ADL) and the Southern Poverty Law Center.

According to Rolling Stone's sources, West had repeatedly brought up the Nazis and Hitler as far back as 2003, during the production of The College Dropout (2004). The sources described West as drawing inspiration from Nazi propaganda for his marketing tactics and becoming confrontational if he did not feel his views were validated. During a freestyle event in 2005, West rapped: "I'm tight with my dough like my family Jews, Uh! I said 'Jews', my career is screwed." In the Graduation (2007) song "Flashing Lights", West raps about hating paparazzi more than Nazis, which California State University, San Bernardino's Brian Levin said trivializes Nazi atrocities.

During the Big Chill music festival on August 6, 2011, West was booed after comparing himself to Hitler during an onstage rant: "There is so much bullshit going on in the music industry right now. Someone needs to make a difference. People treat me like Hitler." The Jerusalem Post wrote that this was West's first remark that "raised eyebrows among Jews". During a November 26, 2013, interview on The Breakfast Club, West explained why he believed that Barack Obama had problems pushing policies in Washington: "Black people don't have the same level of connections as Jewish people ... We ain't Jewish. We don't get family that got money like that." The ADL condemned West's remark as "the age-old canard that Jews are all-powerful and control the levers of power in government". On December 21, 2013, West retracted the statement, telling a Chicago radio station that "I thought I was giving a compliment, but if anything, it came off more ignorant. I don't know how being told you have money is an insult."

Rolling Stone reported that during a late 2015 business call, West described Hitler as a "marketing genius" who "really understood how to mobilize people in a way that no one ever has." An early version of the Life of Pablo (2016) song "Famous" that was leaked online contains cut antisemitic lyrics: "The world turnin' Black slowly, where you can call niggas 'niggas', but you better not mention Hitler, so tell me who run the label, where the guns from?" According to CNN, West wanted to title his 2018 album, released as Ye, Hitler. The conceptual artist Ryder Ripps, who worked with West between 2014 and 2018, recalled West praising the Nazis and discussing antisemitic conspiracy theories in late 2018 meetings. Ripps, a Jew, said he argued with West over the comments but did not regard them as dangerous at the time.

Van Lathan Jr., who conducted the 2018 TMZ interview in which West said slavery "sounds like a choice", said that West also made comments expressing love for Hitler and Nazis which were edited out before publication. In a 2019 interview with David Letterman, West said that liberals treated Trump supporters like Nazis and insinuated that Jews were behind the #MeToo movement; both comments were edited out of the released interview. NBC News reported in November 2022 that West had paid a settlement to an employee who accused him of antisemitism and praising the Nazis. West denied the accusations in the settlement.

=== 2022–2024 ===
Avatar of ye

ye
(@kanyewest)
tweeted:

I'm a bit sleepy tonight but when I wake up I'm going death con 3 On JEWISH PEOPLE The funny thing is I actually can't be Anti Semitic because black people are actually Jew also You guys have toyed with me and tried to black ball anyone whoever opposes your agenda

October 8, 2022

On October 7, 2022, West appeared to suggest in a post on Instagram that Sean Combs is controlled by Jews; in response, Instagram locked his account. After being unable to post on Instagram, and previously not tweeting for nearly two years, on October 8, West tweeted that he was "going death con 3" [sic] on Jewish people, prompting media attention. The tweet was widely condemned as antisemitic, and West's Twitter account was temporarily locked. Prior to sending out the controversial tweet, he had posted an image of himself with Mark Zuckerberg on his Twitter, criticizing Zuckerberg for "kick[ing] him off Instagram".

On October 11, Vice reported on unaired segments of an interview of West by Fox News's Tucker Carlson that aired a few days prior, which contained West making several conspiratorial, racist, and antisemitic statements. West said that Margaret Sanger was a "known eugenic[ist]" and founded Planned Parenthood with the Ku Klux Klan (KKK) "to control the Jew population". He added that "When I say Jew, I mean the 12 lost tribes of Judah, the blood of Christ, who the people known as the race Black really are" and that "This is who our people are. The blood of Christ. This, as a Christian, is my belief." West also disapproved of his children going to a school that celebrates Kwanzaa, saying "I prefer my kids knew Hanukkah than Kwanzaa. At least it will come with some financial engineering." Fox News redacted these segments in their original broadcast.

That month, an episode of LeBron James's show, The Shop: Uninterrupted, featuring West was not released, as West had allegedly made antisemitic comments while recording the episode. On an October 17 episode of the podcast Drink Champs, recorded the day prior, West claimed that he was being targeted by "the Jewish media" and "Zionist Jews" and said, "You really influenced me to get on this anti-Semite vibe and, you know, I'm here to finish the job. I'm here to not back down. They should've never let you niggas get money." In the same interview, West reiterated his claim that black people are the Lost Tribes of Israel. The same day, West alleged in a televised interview with NewsNation's Chris Cuomo that he was being targeted by a "Jewish Underground Media Mafia", which also led to a confrontation with Cuomo.

A few days after these comments, on October 22, the neo-Nazi Goyim Defense League protested in Los Angeles, hanging a banner that read "Kanye is right about the Jews" above a highway overpass while giving Nazi salutes. The demonstration was widely condemned by Jewish advocacy groups and politicians, some of whom urged West's sponsor, Adidas, to cut ties with him. Jeffrey Abrams of the Anti-Defamation League was quoted as expressing that "[t]hese hate groups are now leveraging the anti-Semitic tropes that Kanye West has been peddling on social media [and] on interviews".

In response to his antisemitic statements, Vogue, Universal Music Group, CAA, Balenciaga, Gap, and Adidas terminated their collaborations, sponsorships, and relationships with West. Foot Locker and TJ Maxx removed West's products from their shelves. With the termination of his business relationships, West lost his billionaire status; Forbes estimated his reduced worth at $400 million, coming from his "real estate, cash, his music catalog, and a 5% stake in ex-wife Kim Kardashian's shapewear firm, Skims". On October 26, 2022, West was escorted out of Skechers headquarters in Manhattan Beach, California after he arrived unannounced and uninvited; Skechers said it was "not considering and has no intention of working with West".

Later in December 2022, while speaking to X17, West stated that he does not suffer from bipolar disorder, and that this was a misdiagnosis from a Jewish doctor. He also responded to the claim that he is having a psychotic episode, stating that he is not having one; he also said he "may be slightly autistic, like Rain Man".

==== Donald Trump–Nick Fuentes meeting ====
In late November 2022, West was invited by Donald Trump to dine with him at Mar-a-Lago. West arrived at the dinner with three other guests, including Nick Fuentes, a white nationalist and Holocaust denier. Fuentes' presence at the dinner became the subject of much critical media coverage. U.S. president Joe Biden tweeted that "our political leaders should be calling out and rejecting antisemitism wherever it hides", interpreted as a response to Republican Party leaders failing to condemn Trump hosting West and Fuentes. Political correspondent Jonathan Weisman of The New York Times observed that, for American Jews, "the debate since the dinner has brought into focus what may be the most discomfiting moment in U.S. history in a half-century or more."

==== Timcast IRL interview ====
Following the visit, West and Fuentes made an appearance on Tim Pool's Timcast IRL podcast on November 28, along with Milo Yiannopoulos. While on the podcast, West went into detail about his meeting with Trump, claiming that it was pushed from October to November by Trump after he announced his 2024 bid for presidential election as well as stating that Alex Jones told West to bring Yiannopoulos with him, who in turn introduced Fuentes as well. West also continued to make antisemitic remarks and compared his situation to that of Martin Luther King Jr. and Malcolm X. Pool's reluctance to accept West's views angered West, who repeatedly threatened to leave the set, stating that, "I feel like it's a setup ... I'm going to walk the fuck off the show if I'm having to talk about, 'You can't say Jewish people did it,' when every sensible person knows — that Jon Stewart knows — what happened to me, and they took it too far."

After one of West's statements, Pool made a minor concession to West, stating that he believed that "they" had been unfair to him; this then prompted West to ask Pool to clarify what he meant by "they," speculating (along with Fuentes) that it was a euphemism for Jews. When Pool clarified that he meant the corporate press, West, realizing that Pool would not entertain his viewpoints, abruptly left the interview and was followed by Fuentes and Yiannopoulos. Their departure was widely chastised, including by Pool himself, who continued the show afterwards, derogatorily labeling West's exit from his podcast as "woke".

==== InfoWars interview ====
The Raelian symbol tweeted by West

On December 1, 2022, West praised Hitler on InfoWars, saying "every human being has something of value that they brought to the table, especially Hitler", "I love Jewish people but I also love Nazis", "There's a lot of things that I love about Hitler; a lot of things", "I like Hitler", and "I am a Nazi". He also stated that "we got to stop dissing the Nazis all the time", "the Jewish media has made us feel like the Nazis and Hitler have never offered anything of value to the world", and "my accounts have been frozen by the Jewish banks". West also denied the Holocaust and falsely claimed that it was "factually incorrect" that Hitler killed six million Jews. Following the interview, West posted an image on Twitter of a swastika entangled within a Star of David; the symbol is associated with the Raëlian Movement. His Twitter account was then suspended immediately afterwards, with Twitter owner Elon Musk stating that he had violated Twitter's rules against incitement to violence.

==== Gavin McInnes interview ====
On December 6, 2022, West continued to praise Hitler in an interview with Gavin McInnes, founder of the Proud Boys. He said Jewish people should "forgive Hitler today". He compared abortion to the Holocaust, saying "the Holocaust is not the only holocaust. So for them to take that and claim when we have abortions right now. That's eugenics. That's genocide. That's a holocaust that we're dealing with right now." He said that the Jewish people "control America" and "have China scared", a reference to the Zionist Occupation Government conspiracy theory.

==== Ban from Australia ====
In January 2023, many Australians called for West to be banned from entering Australia over his views, including Opposition Leader Peter Dutton. Dutton told local media:

"My inclination would be not to allow him in. His antisemitic comments are disgraceful, his conduct and behaviour is appalling and he's not a person of good character."

Education Minister Jason Clare also called for West to be banned from Australia, as did Victorian Industry Minister Ben Carroll.

Organizations such as the Anti-Defamation Commission and the Adelaide Holocaust Museum also support banning West from entering the country. In July 2025, it was confirmed that he would be denied entry into the country.

==== Informal apology ====
In an Instagram post from March 2023, West wrote, "Watching Jonah Hill in 21 Jump Street made me like Jewish people again. No one should take anger against one or two individuals and transform that into hatred towards millions of innocent people. No Christian can be labeled antisemite knowing Jesus is Jew. Thank you Jonah Hill I love you."

==== The Trouble with KanYe ====
In The Trouble with KanYe, a 2023 BBC-produced documentary that examines West's controversial views, Alex Klein, a former business partner of West, stated that West was "very angry" and said "I feel like I wanna smack you" and "you're exactly like the other Jews" while working with him. When he asked West if he believed Jews are collaborating with each other to hold him back, he responded by saying "Yes, yes I do." West also said that if he did not have that viewpoint, then he would not "become president".

==== Vultures announcement ====
In December, after a period of media silence, West announced a collaboration with Ty Dolla Sign in the form of the album Vultures 1. The lead single for the album, "Vultures", featured the line "How I'm antisemitic? I just fucked a Jewish bitch", and the initial cover art for the album was called out by fans to suggest a reference to Burzum, the music project for neo-Nazi artist Varg Vikernes. On December 15, a video featuring an expletive-ridden rant from West in a meetup went viral, in which he compared himself to Hitler and Jesus Christ, and criticized people for putting their children in "Zionist schools". He also mentioned Nicki Minaj, Jay-Z, Kim Kardashian, North West (his daughter), Drake, and Donald Trump, as well as criticizing the companies Gap and Adidas. In the same rant, West claimed that "50% of our [Black people] deaths is abortion, and 25% of us [Black people] go to prison" and that "the French own 80% of banks in Africa."

==== Formal apology (2023) ====
On December 26, 2023, West left a post on Instagram in Hebrew, where he apologized for the antisemitic comments he made. On January 19, 2024, he appeared in an Instagram post with fellow rapper JPEGMafia wearing a shirt featuring neo-Nazi musician Varg Vikernes. A month later, he complained of his children being in a "fake school" run by "the system", adding that "At this point everybody knows what 'the system' is code word for."

=== 2025 ===
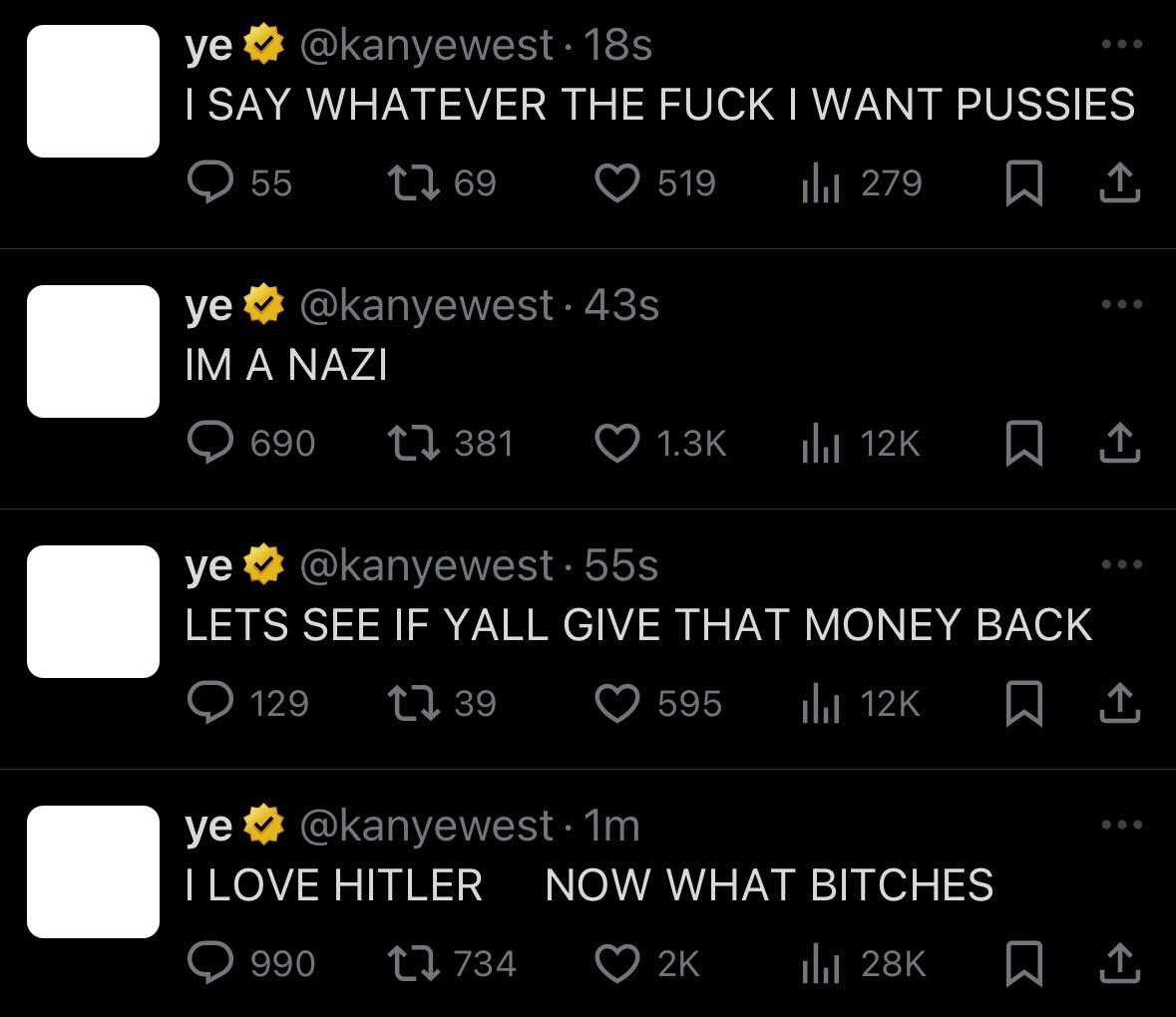
West posted multiple controversial tweets in quick succession during February 2025

In February 2025, after calling for the freeing of Combs amid sex trafficking and racketeering charges, West continued his tirade of antisemitic comments on his Twitter account. West also referenced the Elon Musk salute controversy and commended Chris Brown for overcoming cancel culture. Jonathan Greenblatt of the Anti-Defamation League referred to the comments as "a sad attempt for attention that uses Jews as a scapegoat", adding, "Kanye has a far-reaching platform on which to spread his antisemitism and hate. Words matter. And as we've seen too many times before, hateful rhetoric can prompt real-world consequences." On February 7, West also posted an image purported by others to be of him, taken in 1994; in the photograph, West is seen wearing a t-shirt with a crossed out swastika and the slogan "Say no to Nazis' New America". Snopes has given the image an "unproven" rating in their investigation of the image's authenticity. When tweeting the image in 2025, West wrote "I used to be woke too". Several of West's comments were also deemed as homophobic, ableist, and misogynistic.

On February 9, 2025, during Super Bowl LIX, West ran an ad urging viewers to visit his website, Yeezy.com. West's store page, which initially hosted merchandise dedicated to Sean Combs for sale and various songs, was wiped on February 10, 2025, with only a shirt bearing a Nazi swastika remaining. The shirt appeared on the store front following the advertisement West ran during the Super Bowl the day prior. The shirt was titled "HH-01," presumably intended as an antisemitic dog whistle for the phrase "Heil Hitler." Shopify disabled West's store page the following day, stating that "This merchant did not engage in authentic commerce practices and violated our terms, so we removed them from Shopify". The site went back online on February 13, 2025, only displaying text that reads "Yeezy stores coming soon", followed by a heart. The text also appears in the page title.

Alternative cover art for one of West's albums announced in 2025

West's proposed Sunday Service Choir logo, based on the symbol of the Schutzstaffel

On February 10, 2025, Elon Musk declared that West's Twitter account had been classified as NSFW due to West posting pornographic material, resulting in a shadowban. Subsequently, West's account was temporarily deactivated. On February 19, he tweeted, "After further reflection I've come to the realization that I'm not a Nazi". The sincerity of the statement was questioned by Joe Price of Complex. On February 28, he was seen walking around Los Angeles with a swastika t-shirt on. On March 6, West said that his upcoming album would have "that antisemitic sound". On March 15, he once again identified as a Nazi. On March 16, he tweeted images of a Nazi swastika and the SS runes of the Schutzstaffel, claiming them as his "new album cover" and "new Sunday Service Choir logo", respectively. On March 17, he posted a now deleted video of him with Nick Fuentes on X while wearing a chain with a swastika pendant. In the video, West called Fuentes "my white supremacist homeboy".

==== Antisemitic songs and lyrics: "WW3", "Heil Hitler", and Cuck ====
On March 15, West uploaded a new song to his X account dubbed "WW3" which featured a set of lines going "They telling me that I'm a bully, I'm antisemitic fully. They sayin' I'm acting like Hitler, but how am I acting like Hitler? When I'm a fucking nigger." "WW3" was later released on streaming services under a new recording alias, "Ye". On March 30, West joined blogger and Internet personality DJ Akademiks for an interview. In the interview, West donned a black outfit inspired by the Ku Klux Klan and continued to make antisemitic remarks.

On April 3, West teased a new album titled WW3. On the tracklist, there was the previously mentioned title track, as well as two new songs; "Heil Hitler" and "Hitler Ye and Jesus". West has stated that the album was written by fellow rapper Dave Blunts. On April 21, West said he changed the album name to Cuck. In May 2025, he released the song "Heil Hitler". The song alludes to West referring to himself once again as a Nazi, and alluding to that he either adopted or began to be open with his ideology due to his inability to see his children. Lyrics include "With all of the money and fame I still don't get to see my children..." "...So I became a Nazi yea, bitch I'm the villain." "Nigga Heil Hitler, they don't understand the things I say on Twitter, all my niggas Nazis, nigga Heil Hitler." The video features 32 dark-skinned models, some donned with animal skins chanting the lyrics of the song. The video closes with an excerpt of a 1935 speech from Adolf Hitler himself, given at the Krupp Factory in Essen. A previous version of the song is quoted as referencing rapper Drake as a "faggot", which has been referred to as a diss: "Niggas be acting like faggots so much, I think they might be Drake."

==== Twitter apology ====
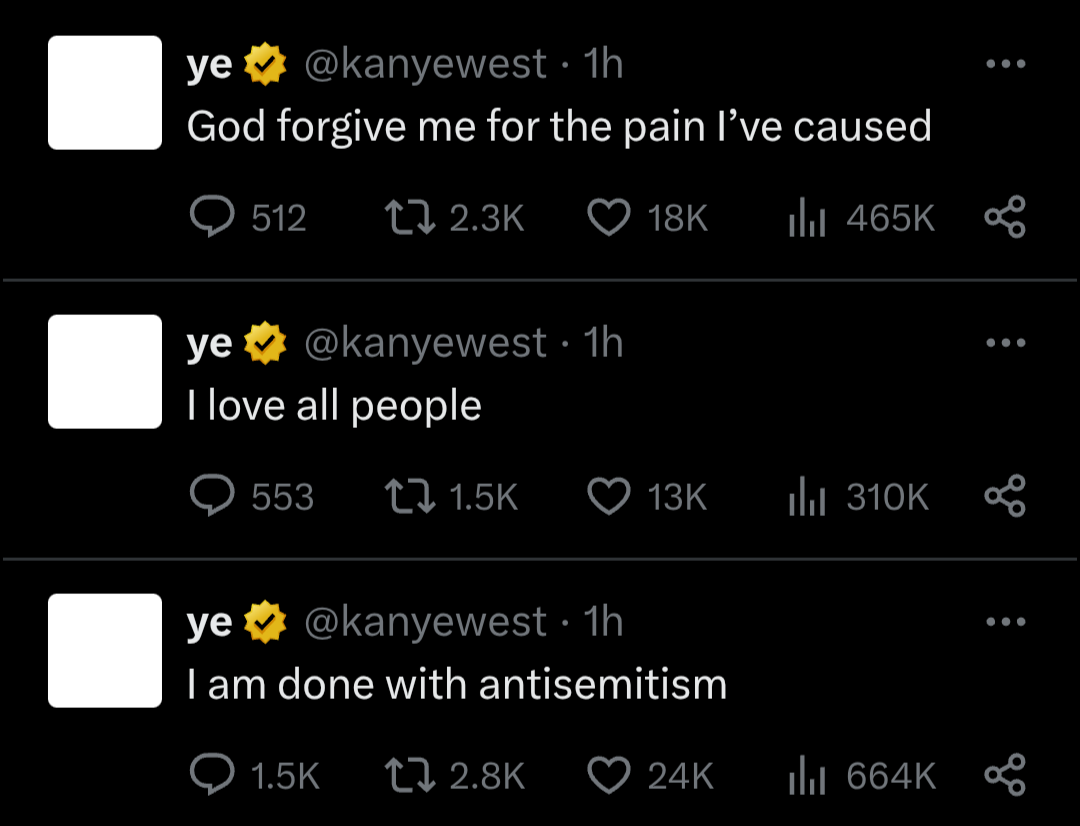
West's apology

On May 22, 2025, West tweeted that he was "done with antisemitism" following a FaceTime call with his children. He asked God to "forgive me for the pain I've caused" and said that he forgave those who caused him pain, though some questioned the sincerity of his apology. Vibe wrote that it was unclear if this "reflect[ed] genuine growth or an attempt at image repair". On May 31, he re-uploaded "Heil Hitler" as "Hallelujah", which replaces references to Nazism with lyrics relating to Christianity. On June 22, West announced that he would be changing his album's name from Cukkk to In a Perfect World.

In an interview with VladTV, Blunts claimed that West had moved on from antisemitic rhetoric, stating that, "he's not on that anymore, he's doing better now."

==== Meeting with Yoshiyahu Yosef Pinto ====
On November 6, 2025, West met with the Israeli-Moroccan Orthodox rabbi Yoshiyahu Yosef Pinto to apologize and take accountability for his antisemitic statements. He said his antisemitism was influenced by his struggles with bipolar disorder, which he said would "take [my ideas] to an extreme where I would forget about the protection of the people around me, or myself". Pinto forgave West and praised him for taking steps towards accountability.

Nicki Minaj and Ty Dolla Sign expressed support for West. Jacob L. Freedman, a Jewish psychiatrist and researcher, wrote for Aish.com that the meeting was a meaningful first step and encouraged West to "publicly state what steps he plans on taking to ensure that he will not repeat his mistakes... beyond apologizing and seeking to repair the damage done, he should focus on being a positive force by taking steps to publicly fight against antisemitism". On November 13, HotNewHipHop reported that West had been reaching out to Jewish former collaborators to apologize and was ordering YouTube copyright strikes on "Heil Hitler".

=== 2026 ===
==== Wall Street Journal apology ====
On January 26, 2026, West took out a full-page advertisement in the Wall Street Journal containing an open letter titled "To Those I’ve Hurt." In the letter, West issued a comprehensive apology for his past antisemitic remarks and the use of Nazi imagery, such as the swastika. He attributed his past behavior to "neurological damage" resulting from his 2002 car accident, claiming a 2023 diagnosis revealed an injury to his right frontal lobe that had gone unnoticed for over two decades.

West stated that this injury exacerbated his bipolar type-1 disorder and led to "disconnected moments" of poor judgment and "psychotic, paranoid and impulsive behavior." While stating that his medical condition "does not excuse" his actions, he explicitly disavowed being a Nazi or an antisemite, expressing a commitment to "accountability, treatment, and meaningful change." The letter also addressed the Black community, apologizing for "letting [them] down."
