= Alive (Kanye West and YoungBoy Never Broke Again song) =

2025 single by Kanye West and YoungBoy Never Broke Again

Single by Kanye West and YoungBoy Never Broke Again
- Released: May 21, 2025
- Genre: Hip-hop
- Length: 1:57
- Label: YZY
- Songwriters: Ye; Kentrell DeSean Gaulden; Jordan Terrell Carter; Ronald K. Keys Jr.; Richard Ortiz; Ștefan Cișmigiu
- Producers: F1lthy; Lucian

Kanye West singles chronology
"Heil Hitler" (2025)	"Alive" (2025)	"Gemini Season" (2026)

YoungBoy Never Broke Again singles chronology
"Luv Lik Me" (2024)	"Alive" (2025)	"Finest" (2025)

"Alive" (stylized in all caps) is a song by American rappers Kanye West and YoungBoy Never Broke Again. It was surprise released on May 21, 2025. The song prominently samples ad-libs by DJ Swamp Izzo from the Playboi Carti song "Crank"; as a result, both are credited as songwriters. Musically, "Alive" is minimalist and high-energy, with its production solely consisting of a distorted 808 bass. In the song's verses, both artists take turns rapping about their detractors and those who fake influence.

Before its release, "Alive" was previewed in full on West's Instagram page, being sent to music streaming platforms later in the day. Shortly after the preview, Carti alleged that West had stolen the song from him, uploading his own version that contained an additional verse and a music video. Both versions of the song received positive reception from music critics, who often praised each artist's performance alongside the production. West later updated the track after its release, and planned to film a music video in Utah. Commercially, "Alive" peaked at number 25 on the New Zealand Hot Singles chart.

== Background ==
YoungBoy Never Broke Again showed support for West during his expression of antisemitic views between 2022 and 2025. In YoungBoy's song "This Not a Song, This For My Supporters", released a day after West's December 2022 appearance on Alex Jones's Infowars, he suggests that West is deeply hurt; "It hurt my heart that Kanye let them people break his soul / How the fuck that go? Nigga, stay in yo' home! / Nigga, hold your ground! You strong." YoungBoy featured on "Let Me Chill Out", an unreleased track from West and Ty Dolla Sign's collaborative album Vultures 2 (2024), which also featured Rich the Kid and posthumous vocals from Takeoff.

After its release, Playboi Carti alleged online that "Alive" was originally a collaboration between him and YoungBoy, with the song being "stolen" by West. Hours later, Carti posted his own version on Instagram, featuring no vocals from West and his own verse at the end, which vocally consists of "moans, croaks, and snarls through a series of opulent flexes". Carti uploaded it alongside a music video paying homage to YoungBoy, celebrating his recent release from jail and displaying the words "WELCOME HOME TOP" in all caps. The video also featured Giovanni Ramos, who was rumored to be Carti's girlfriend at the time.

== Composition and lyrics ==
"Alive"
Part of the first verse and chorus to "Alive", featuring a distorted 808 bass and raps from both rappers aimed at their detractors.

"Alive" is a high-energy track that prominently uses vocal samples of DJ Swamp Izzo from "Crank" by Carti. Its production consists of a blaring, distorted 808 bass, which critics compared to West's song "New Slaves" due to lacking any drums. The rappers go back and forth together during the verses. YoungBoy's sections of the opening verse reference West's upcoming Yeezy Season 10 fashion collection and interpolates West's single "Carnival", with West's parts being aimed at people who fake social and musical influence, such as "stealin' the swag" they did not come up with or pretending to be rich. YoungBoy's second verse is aimed at his detractors, featuring raps about shooting at them with semi-automatic rifles that fire .223 cartridges. During the chorus, YoungBoy celebrates his newfound freedom from prison.

== Release ==
West first released "Alive" to Instagram on May 21, 2025, featuring the caption "ALIVE YE X NBA YoungBoy YZY SZN 10". Later that day, West uploaded the track to music streaming services. The song was meant to be used for West's Yeezy Season X fashion collection. Commercially, "Alive" peaked at number 25 on the New Zealand Hot Singles chart dated May 30, 2025. After its release, West announced plans to film a music video for "Alive" in Utah, and posted snippets of updated versions of the song, including new mixes.

== Critical reception ==
Both versions of "Alive" received positive reviews from music critics. Alexander Cole of HotNewHipHop complimented West's version, noting that West and YoungBoy's back and forth exchange is "nicely done", regarding it as the last time West has sounded "serious" on a track since Vultures 2. He concluded that, "If you are someone who cares a lot about clean mixes, this will probably make your ears bleed. But if you just want to have fun, then maybe this song will do something for you." Regarding Carti's version, Pitchfork's Jude Noel described both his and YoungBoy's performances as "amped", with the song itself "[fusing] his recent taste for industrial trap cut-ups with the bass-led minimalism of 'New Slaves'". She opined that, if West was always meant to be the main artist, "then that just makes Carti’s remix even more diabolical."

== Credits and personnel ==
Credits adapted from Apple Music. (Note: Writing credits have since been removed for unknown reasons.)

- Ye – vocals, writing
- Kentrell DeSean Gaulden – vocals, writing
- Jordan Terrell Carter – writing
- Ronald K. Keys Jr. – writing
- Richard Ortiz (F1lthy) – writing, production
- Ștefan Cișmigiu (Lucian) – writing, production

== Charts ==
Chart (2025)	Peak position
New Zealand Hot Singles (RMNZ)	25
