= Bianca 27 =

Danish built and designed sailboat, 27 feet long

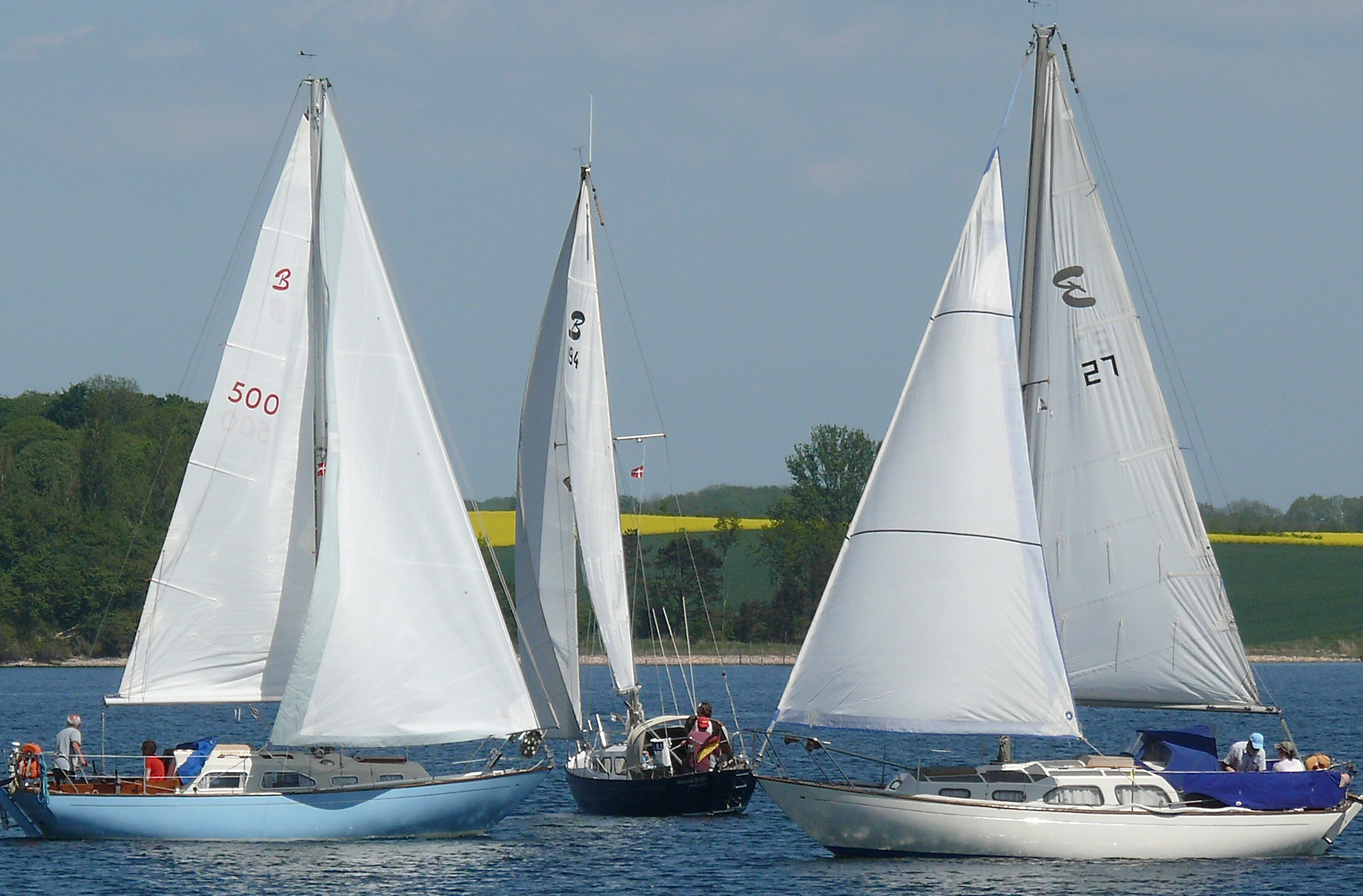

Bianca 27 is a Danish built and designed sailboat, 27 feet long (eight meters). It was constructed in 1964-1965 by a naval architect Svend Aage Leth Christensen (b. 1933). His wooden boat design, Peti, was a preliminary study for the Bianca. Together with his brother, boatbuilder Holger Leth Christensen (b. 1934) he founded the Bianca Yacht in Rudkoebing in the former depot for the local railway on the island of Langeland. Together with manager and boatbuilder Per Munch the brothers were among the pioneers in Danish boatbuilding using the new material, fiberglass reinforced polyester. Bianca 27 was the first Danish designed fiberglass-sailboat manufactured in large series. Production ran for more than ten years and the total number of completed boats is about 530. Bianca 27 is still a popular and stable yacht. Although the hull and superstructure is fiberglass, the boat has plenty of wood in it.

Bianca 27 has proven its seaworthiness by many races in the big oceans. The Swedish author Milo Dahlman wrote My Dream of the Sea on her own voyage singlehanded in a Bianca 27 across the Atlantic. Bianca Yacht in Rudkøbing, Denmark runs today in the old long since expanded depot by Holger Leth Christensen's son, boatbuilder Anders Leth Christensen yard with service and repair. Bianca 27 sailors from more than ten countries met In the summer of 2009 in cooperation with Svendborg Classic Regatta Bianca a 27-day event in Rudkøbing by 30 participating vessels from three countries.
