= Paul Mathias Padua =

German painter (1903–1981)

- Born: 15 November 1903; Salzburg, Austria-Hungary
- Died: 22 August 1981 (aged 77); Rottach-Egern, West Germany
- Known for: Painting
- Movement: Realism, New Objectivity, Nazi art

Paul Mathias Padua (15 November 1903 – 22 August 1981) was an Austrian-born German painter. He was committed to the tradition of the realist painter Wilhelm Leibl, which was highly valued by Adolf Hitler, and was very successful as an official artist in Nazi Germany.

== Biography ==
Padua was born in Salzburg, Austria, but grew up in poor conditions with his grandparents in Geiselhöring and Straubing, in Lower Bavaria. He lost his father at the age of nine. Padua later would move to Murnau and Munich. He abandoned his early academic education to concentrate on his painting. Padua's early work was essentially influenced by Wilhelm Leibl; his later work was increasingly influenced by the New Objectivity. In 1922, he became a member of the Munich Artists' Association. In the following years, his paintings were regularly exhibited. In 1928, he received the Georg-Schicht Prize and in 1930 the Albrecht Dürer Prize, from the city of Nuremberg. In the 1930s, Padua's popularity increased, so that he exhibited in several cities outside the Munich region and in other European countries.

Padua's focus on traditional art was rather unusual as he had not received any completed academic training. He was recognized as an official artist in Nazi Germany, after 1933. He was represented at the Great German Art Exhibitions, from 1938 to 1944, in the House of German Art, in Munich, with 23 works, including still lifes and female nudes. In 1937 and 1940 he received the Lenbach Prize, from Munich, for portraits. Among those he portrayed were composer Franz Lehár and writer Gerhart Hauptmann. In 1938 he created the fresco painting depicting farmers dressed in the costume of the region of Bavarian Oberland, on the front side of the Weilheimer Hochlandhalle, a livestock auction hall built in 1937/38, which has since then also served as an event hall for the city of Weilheim, and was included as a monument in the Bavarian State Office for Monument Protection's, in 2017.

At the beginning of the World War II, Padua was drafted into a propaganda company as a war painter. After being slightly wounded during the Western campaign, he was sent back to Germany in May 1940. Until 1943, he painted some of the most famous paintings of German Nazi propaganda art, such as The Führer Speaks, which depicts a family listening to a speech by Adolf Hitler in the radio, and May 10th, 1940, which heroizes the beginning of the Western campaign, and is stylistically inspired on the 19th century Realism. In 1943, Padua was included in the exhibition Young Art in the German Empire, held in the Vienna Künstlerhaus. In 1943, Padua moved to St. Wolfgang, in Austria. In 1944, he was included in the Gottbegnadeten list of the Reich Ministry of Propaganda.

He seems not to have been affected by the denazification process in Austria, after 1945. In 1951, Padua settled back in Germany. He acquired a house in Rottach-Egern, from Else Pfeifer. Here in the Tegernsee Valley, he opened his own Gallery by the Lake. He continued his career as a portrait painter. He portrayed personalities such as Friedrich Flick, Helmut Horten, Makarios III, Otto Hahn, Herbert von Karajan and Franz Josef Strauss. Since 1960 onwards, Padua traveled regularly to the fishing town of Nazaré, in Portugal, where he created several paintings, often inspired by the local people.

He died of a stroke on 22 August 1981, in Rottach-Egern. He was buried at the local cemetery at the Protestant Church of the Resurrection.
