= Dave Blunts =

American rapper and singer (born 2000)

- Born: Davion Blessing; July 1, 2000 (age 26); Salt Lake City, Utah, U.S.
- Origin: Davenport, Iowa
- Genres: Midwestern hip-hop; trap; emo rap
- Occupations: Rapper; singer; songwriter
- Instrument: Vocals
- Years active: 2018–present
- Label: Listen to the Kids
- Website: daveblunts.co

Davion Blessing (born July 1, 2000), known professionally as Dave Blunts, is an American rapper, singer, and songwriter. He gained popularity in December 2024 after videos of him performing while using an oxygen tank went viral and yielded public concern for his health.

Blunts began recording and releasing music in 2018. In 2024, he started uploading videos to TikTok, quickly gaining popularity. His 2024 song "The Cup" went viral on the platform. In June 2024, Blunts released his debut studio album, Well Dude Here's My Thing. His second studio album, If I Could I Would, was released in October.

In April 2025, Blunts released his third studio album, You Can't Say That. That same year, Blunts began working with American rapper Kanye West, writing the majority of his unreleased studio album, Cuck. Blunts has been reported as the sole songwriter for the album's three singles: "WW3", "Cousins", and "Heil Hitler". Blunts later cut ties with West in September 2025, alleging that he was coerced into writing the album's Nazi-related lyrics.

== Early life ==
Davion Blessing was born in Salt Lake City, Utah on July 1, 2000. When he was around three years old, he moved to Davenport, Iowa. He has two sisters and one brother. Their father died when Blunts was eight. Blessing was raised in the Christian church, but as he grew up, he separated from Christianity. Later in life, he realized his separation and decided to do Bible study with friends, though he clarified that he did not have time for it in July 2024.

Blessing began recording and releasing music on Facebook in 2018. Due to the nature of his humor and the memes he frequently posted, his accounts were often banned. One of these accounts, registered under the name "Dave Blunts", went on to be reused as his stage name.

== Career ==
=== 2024: Initial virality ===
After contemplating quitting music in late 2023, Blunts began uploading videos to TikTok in 2024, quickly gaining popularity. He released three projects between February and March, as well as the single "The Cup", which received support from rapper Lil Yachty. Blunts later signed to the Los Angeles label Listen to the Kids. On June 28, 2024, he released his debut studio album, Well Dude Here's My Thing. He released his second studio album, If I Could I Would, on October 18.

In November 2024, Blunts performed at Juice Wrld Day, a concert commemorating late rapper Juice Wrld, while using an oxygen tank. Videos of the performance went viral. During the performance, he directed criticism towards rapper Snoop Dogg, who had previously insulted Blunts in an Instagram post. Snoop Dogg later apologized for his comments.

=== 2025–2026: You Can't Say That, I'll Believe It When I See It, and work with Kanye West ===
On an episode of Bradley Martyn's Raw Talk podcast posted to YouTube on December 17, 2024, Blunts announced that his upcoming third studio album would be titled Exactly So Shut Up. Blunts supported the upcoming album on February 28, 2025, with the release of "First Day Out The Hospital," which later landed on Complex's list of the 20 best “First Day Out” songs. The album was ultimately titled You Can't Say That and was released on April 18, 2025. On the album, Blunts raps about his health struggles, record deals, previous feuds with other artists, and former girlfriends. In an Instagram post accompanying the album's announcement, Blunts complained about people who accused him of being too vulgar, saying that, "these are the harsh realities of my life and I'm not gonna Kidzbopify my lyrics because the shit I go through is not sunshine and rainbows." The album received generally positive reception, with Vibe praising the record for being "littered with moments that leave you with no choice but to sing and jam along".

In February 2025, Blunts met fellow rapper Kanye West through a mutual connection, and they started working on an album together. According to West, he and Blunts spent hours talking each day, and Blunts wrote songs based on their conversations. Blunts has been reported as the sole writer for West's unreleased album Cuck, starting after the former previewed the single "WW3". The album's second single, titled "Cousins", was fully written by Blunts. Blunts denied that the album is antisemitic, describing it as being "about one man going between hurt, betrayal and pain". He also published several reference tracks created for Cuck online.

After distancing himself from West in September 2025, Blunts released his fourth album, I'll Believe It When I See It, on July 17, 2026. It was preceded by the single "Unnecessary" and the non-album song "Bigger", the latter receiving media attention for its lyrics that targeted several different rappers. He released the EP Ulysses on August 28 to generally negative reviews, with Alexander Cole of HotNewHipHop complaining that the rapper's "whole schtick [had] grown pretty tired" in relation to its continued usage of offensive lyrics and a repetitive style.

== Musical style ==
Blunts's musical style is characterized by shock value, self-deprecating lines, and personal experiences with exes. He has stated that his favorite topics to rap about are "women, [his] friends, traumatic experiences, and controversial topics." Blunts typically opens his songs with a vocal warm-up, singing "Yeah… yeah yeah yeah yeah". His style has been compared to fellow rapper Juice Wrld. Blunts's music revolves around edgy humor and has been categorized as meme rap. Popculture.com and RapReviews have accused Blunts of using homophobic lyrics.

== Health concerns ==
Blunts's Juice Wrld Day performance prompted widespread concern for his well-being due to his morbidly obese condition and being dependent on an oxygen tank while on stage. Blunts reportedly weighed over 600 pounds (270 kg) during this period, as mentioned in a September 2024 interview. He suffered heart failure in 2023. Blunts was hospitalized a week before his Juice Wrld Day performance, although he later stated it was for a checkup.

On December 24, 2024, Blunts pledged to better his health, throwing away his signature purple tracksuit. He suffered a case of influenza shortly afterward, and was hospitalized again when his symptoms worsened. He later posted to X that he was "not giving up as long as you guys don't give up on me."

=== Weight loss ===
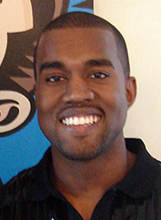
Kanye West (pictured in 2006) helped Blunts during his weight loss journey.

In March 2025, Kanye West pledged to help Blunts lose weight by connecting him to his own personal trainer. Blunts later thanked West for his action, writing on Instagram that it meant the world to him. In June, Blunts worked out with Canadian Twitch streamer Agent00 of the collective AMP, who declared that the rapper would have "abs by November." He later posted photos of him with celebrity trainer Bradley Martin, captioning it "One Step At a Time". West congratulated Blunts on his progress, texting him that "Nobody can fuck with you. Best rapper on the planet." According to Blunts, he had lost over 200 pounds during his last hospitalization.

Due to his health, Blunts announced that he would "[take] a brief hiatus from the internet, from music, and truly just focus on exercising, eating right and bettering myself. Not for the fans, not for the bitches, myself."

== Feuds ==
=== 50 Cent ===
50 Cent (pictured in 2024) began feuding with Blunts after criticizing Kanye West's songs "Cousins", which Blunts wrote.

In July 2025, Blunts started feuding with American rapper 50 Cent after the latter mocked West for showing up at Sean Combs' trial. 50 Cent had made other statements towards West in the same year, mainly in response to the song "Cousins". According to Blunts, this did not escalate into a proper feud between him and 50 Cent until he began making comments about West's wife Bianca Censori. Blunts offered to criticize 50 Cent on the behalf of West due to West's poor mental state, as he believed that the rapper would only continue to insult West if he responded on his own, and the two soon began exchanging posts about each other on social media.

After 50 Cent claimed he would push Blunts "down the stairs" if he ever saw him, the latter previewed a diss track aimed at the former, named "Hey Curtis" in reference to the rapper's legal name, on Instagram. In the track, Blunts calls him an "actor" who does not "really want no drama", as well as accusing the mother of his children of going to Combs' freak off parties. Blunts also mocked 50 Cent's appearance in the 2011 film All Things Fall Apart, writing it off in comparison to his own weight loss, as 50 Cent "lost all that weight for that weak ass movie and nobody watched that shit." The song's music video, previewed a few days before its release, parodies the video for 50 Cent's 2003 promotional single "Many Men (Wish Death)", with Blunts working out while a trio of nurses examine him. The diss track was officially released as a single on August 23, 2025.

The feud between 50 Cent and Blunts had mostly ceased by September 2025, as Blunts no longer needed to defend West after they stopped working together, though he went on to name both the rapper and the mother of his children on his single "Bigger", released two months later. In the track, he refers to their feud as a "lifelong beef" and claims that 50 Cent's former partner enjoys being urinated on. Blunts publicly considered their feud to be over in an interview with American media personality Bootleg Kev, agreeing with Kev that he had come out "unscathed" while also admitting to being just as "petty" as 50 Cent, "if not worse".

=== Kanye West ===
Despite working on the majority of Cuck, Blunts cut ties with West on September 12, 2025, via a text exchange where he urged West to "please find God." Previously that same week, Blunts posted to Instagram that he would no longer collaborate with West, as he was "on my own path." On September 17, a diss track aimed at West surfaced on social media, in which Blunts accuses West of grooming him into Nazi ideology and forcing him to write antisemitic lyrics. Blunts claimed in the song that he wrote the tracks on Cuck for millions of dollars despite not wanting "handouts" from West, and clarified that he did not support the themes of incest discussed on "Cousins". Three days later, Blunts previewed a new diss track alleging that West is "off his rocker" due to not taking medication for his bipolar disorder, additionally calling him "gay" due to the events described on "Cousins". Although West did not respond to any of Blunts's statements, West's longtime collaborator Consequence defended him by suggesting on X that Blunts only used the rapper for fame.

== Discography ==
=== Studio albums ===
List of studio albums, with selected details
Title	Studio album details
Well Dude Here's My Thing	Released: June 28, 2024; Label: Listen to the Kids, Foundation; Format: Digital download, streaming
If I Could I Would	Released: October 18, 2024; Label: Listen to the Kids, Foundation; Format: Digital download, streaming
You Can't Say That	Released: April 18, 2025; Label: Listen to the Kids, Foundation; Format: Digital download, streaming
I'll Believe It When I See It	Released: July 17, 2026; Label: Listen to the Kids; Format: Digital download, streaming

=== Mixtapes ===
List of mixtapes, with selected details
Title	Mixtape details
Change or Get Changed	Released: May 13, 2025; Label: Self-released; Format: Streaming (SoundCloud)

=== Extended plays ===
List of EPs, with selected details
Title	EP details
Cabeza de guapo	Released: September 29, 2020; Label: Self-released; Format: Digital download, streaming
Hungry for Fame	Released: June 30, 2021; Label: Self-released; Format: Digital download, streaming
Life Without Anosha	Released: February 18, 2022; Label: Self-released; Format: Digital download, streaming
Stranded in Mexico	Released: June 17, 2022; Label: Self-released; Format: Digital download, streaming
Hopped the Border	Released: September 8, 2022; Label: Self-released; Format: Digital download, streaming
Through the Oxygen	Released: November 1, 2022; Label: Self-released; Format: Digital download, streaming
Illegal Immigrant	Released: February 10, 2023; Label: Self-released; Format: Digital download, streaming
Green Card	Released: February 22, 2023; Label: Self-released; Format: Digital download, streaming
Anybody Can Be Somebody's Hero	Released: May 15, 2023; Label: Self-released; Format: Digital download, streaming
From an IEP into the ICU	Released: August 19, 2023; Label: Self-released; Format: Digital download, streaming
Bigger Than I Ever Was	Released: October 13, 2023; Label: Self-released (initial release); Listen to the Kids (re-release); Format: Digital download, streaming
FTBZ	Released: November 30, 2023; Label: Self-released (initial release); Listen to the Kids (re-release); Format: Digital download, streaming
Jayce and His Undying Quest to Find His Dad	Released: December 15, 2023; Label: Self-released (initial release); Listen to the Kids (re-release); Format: Digital download, streaming
You Are Not That Special	Released: February 1, 2024; Label: Self-released (initial release); Listen to the Kids (re-release); Format: Digital download, streaming
I Can Do What You Can Do	Released: March 7, 2024; Label: Self-released (initial release); Listen to the Kids (re-release); Format: Digital download, streaming
I Would Like to See You Try	Released: March 28, 2024; Label: Self-released (initial release); Listen to the Kids (re-release); Format: Digital download, streaming
Ulysses	Released: August 28, 2026; Label: TripleThreat; Format: Digital download, streaming

=== Singles ===
==== As lead artist ====
Title	Year	Album
"I Can't Sleep"	2019	Non-album single
"It's Complicated"	2019	Non-album single
"Never Sober"	2019	Non-album single
"Failed Gym Class"	2019	Non-album single
"Shrek Flow"	2019	Non-album single
"McLovin"	2020	Non-album single
"Dying Inside" (featuring E$ave)	2020	Non-album single
"Que Mierda!"	2020	Non-album single
"Never Sober, Pt. 2"	2020	Non-album single
"Egirls"	2022	Non-album single
"Talking to the Sun"	2024	Well Dude Here's My Thing
"Purple Stuff"	2024	Green Card & Well Dude Here's My Thing
"The Cup"	2024	From an IEP into the ICU, Well Dude Here's My Thing, & If I Could I Would
"Summer Ends" (with DC2Trill)	2024	Non-album single
"Bundle of Sticks"	2024	If I Could I Would
"Solar Sunday"	2024	If I Could I Would
"10 Percs"	2024	If I Could I Would
"Check on My N****s"	2024	If I Could I Would
"Vices" (with the Missing Peace)	2025	Non-album single
"Thinking of You"	2025	You Can't Say That
"First Day Out the Hospital"	2025	You Can't Say That
"Balcony"	2025	You Can't Say That
"Hey Curtis"	2025	Non-album single
"Bigger"	2025	Non-album single
"Unnecessary"	2026	Non-album single
"World Champ"	2026	Non-album single
