= Yoshiyahu Yosef Pinto =

Israeli-Moroccan Orthodox rabbi (born 1973)

Rabbi Yoshiyahu Yosef Pinto
- יאשיהו יוסף פינטו
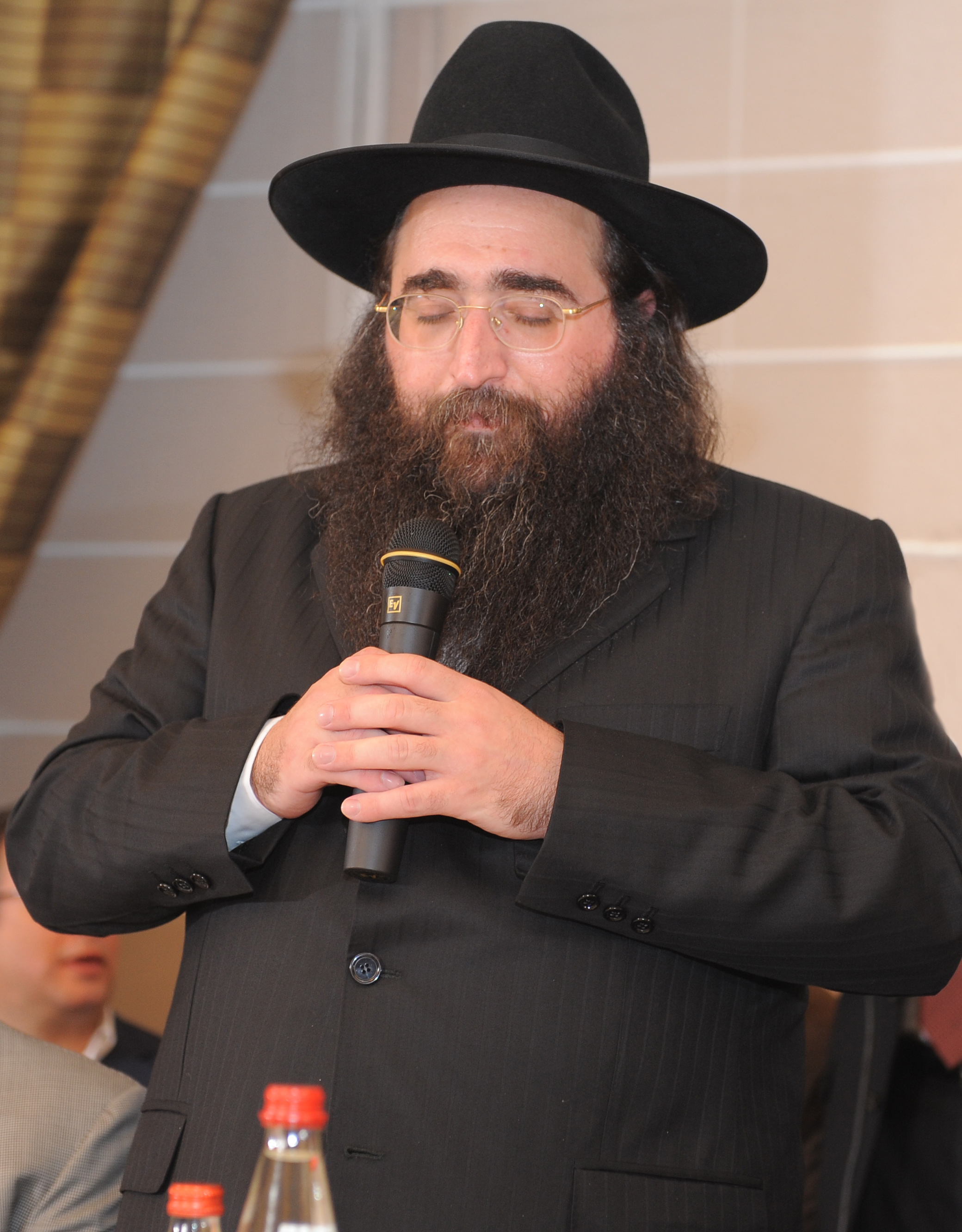
- Pinto in 2011

Personal life
- Born: September 27, 1973 (age 52)
- Parent: Chaim Pinto (father)

Religious life
- Religion: Judaism

Jewish leader
- Position: Founder and head
- Organisation: Mosdot Shuva Israel
- Other: Chief Rabbi of Morocco
- Residence: Morocco

Yoshiyahu Yosef Pinto (Hebrew: יאשיהו יוסף פינטו, Arabic: يوشياهو يوسف بينتو; born September 27, 1973) is an Israeli-Moroccan Orthodox rabbi who leads a global organization called Mosdot Shuva Israel. Based in Ashdod and New York City, he is a Kabbalist. Globes business journal named him in 2012 as one of the ten wealthiest rabbis in Israel.

As part of a series of legal issues, he pleaded guilty in September 2014 to bribing a high-ranking Israeli police officer. He was sentenced on May 12, 2015, to one year in prison, and to pay a fine of 1 million shekels. He began serving his prison sentence on February 16, 2016. After his release, he became the Chief Rabbi of Morocco in 2019.

== Biography ==
Yoshiyahu Yosef Pinto was born in Israel to Moroccan-Jewish parents. On his father's side, he is the great-grandson of Chaim Pinto, a Moroccan sage; on his mother's side, he is the great-grandson of Rabbi Yisrael Abuhatzeira, also known as the Baba Sali.

Pinto graduated from Ashkenazi Lithuanian yeshivas, and studied under Ashkenazi and Hassidic rabbis. Pinto was also influenced by Satmar Hassidism and its teachings.

Pinto speaks Hebrew, and does not know English. Around 2008, Pinto moved to New York City for medical treatments. He then spent time in New York City and Ashdod, where he ran the Shuva Israel yeshiva. After his release from prison in 2017, he settled in Morocco.

== Rabbinic career ==
Pinto is a rabbi and religious leader. Prior to extensive legal issues, he had a following as a spiritual leader and is a Kabbalist. He is said to be the descendant of rabbinical dynasties that reportedly have the potential to work miracles. Pinto has many followers from the Israeli expatriate community in the U.S. and has been described as "a rabbi to the rich and famous".

When he was in his 20s, Pinto founded Shuva Israel, a yeshiva in Ashdod, Israel. As founder he oversees an organization that includes two yeshivas in Ashkelon, one in Kiryat Malachi, three in Ashdod, and one in Rishon LeZion, with a total of 500 students to be rabbinical students in training. The organization also has two schools for girls in Ashdod and a training school in Ashkelon. One of the Israeli locations provides money for living expenses to 180 widowed women. Several yeshivas or religious schools located in the United States and Israel and sponsors a charitable organization that provides food for Israeli families in need. Pinto's center in Ashod has four synagogues that serve more than 1,200 worshippers, a yeshiva with over 300 full-time students, and a soup kitchen that provides 3,000 meals a day. Pinto has also established a network of yeshivas in Israel, Los Angeles, Miami, and New York in the U.S.

In October 2010, Pinto led thousands to Silistra in Bulgaria, for an annual pilgrimage in homage of Eliezer Papo. During his stay in Bulgaria, Pinto held a meeting with 80 Jewish American businessmen, asking them to invest $5 billion in the Israeli economy.

In April 2019, Rabbi Yoshiyahu Yosef Pinto was appointed and officially installed as the Chief Rabbi of Morocco, becoming the first person to hold this position in modern times. The ceremony, held in Casablanca with senior government officials and Jewish community leaders in attendance, was conducted with the blessing of King Mohammed VI. Pinto, a descendant of Haim Pinto of Essaouira who had been residing in Morocco since 2017, was tasked with providing spiritual leadership to the country’s Jewish community and overseeing matters of religious life and heritage preservation.

In March 2020, Pinto called upon the Jews of Morocco and the global Jewish community to comply with governmental regulations intended to contain the COVID-19 pandemic, in response to reports of Orthodox Jewish Haredi communities around the world defying restrictions on their traditional lifestyle.

In November 2025, Pinto met with the American rapper Kanye West, who had faced widespread criticism in the preceding years for expressing antisemitic views. West expressed remorse for his views, which he blamed on his struggles with bipolar disorder. Pinto forgave West and praised him for taking steps towards accountability.

== Business career ==
Pinto has extensive connections in the real estate community in New York, including an executive with Metropolitan Real Estate Investors and one with Ilan Bracha of Prudential Douglas Elliman. His followers include Jay Schottenstein (chairman of the American Eagle Outfitters clothing company) and real estate mogul Jacky Ben-Zaken. Pinto has been characterized as "something between a guru and a Hasidic rebbe" and as a "mystically inclined" Kabbalist with an interest in the esoteric elements of the Jewish tradition". Although Pinto has no formal business background, a number of prominent Israeli and Jewish-American businessmen have visited him for consultation, including talk-show host Donny Deutsch; jeweler Jacob Arabo ("Jacob the Jeweler"); former Congressman Anthony Weiner. Prominent non-Jews who have consulted with Pinto include New York City politician Michael Grimm and basketball player LeBron James. Pinto has said that he does not consider his help to be advice, saying instead that "It’s more of a blessing". Politicians and businessmen who have visited Pinto in Israel include Justice Minister Yaakov Neeman, former Bank of Israel governor Jacob Frenkel, and Israeli soccer star Guy Levy. Because of Pinto's influence, he has been called the "rabbi to the business stars", and was described by Yoel Hasson, a Kadima member of the Knesset, as having connections and influence with a number of people in Israeli politics.

According to an article in the Globes business journal, in June 2012, Forbes Israel named Pinto as one of the 10 wealthiest rabbis in Israel, "with a fortune of NIS 75 million" "based on organizational holdings" such as "charitable activities and properties".

== Legal problems ==
In September 2011, Pinto's father-in law, the chief Rabbi of Argentina, Shlomo Ben Hamo, retracted accusations of money laundering against Pinto in the Jerusalem District Court. The father-in-law said the retraction was "part of an arrangement made for legal reasons and to preserve domestic tranquility". Under the terms of the agreement, Pinto was required to pay NIS 3.4 million for two apartments purchased by his father-in-law, in the Gold housing complex in Jerusalem, with funds that were allegedly obtained from Pinto.

On October 12, 2012 Pinto was reported to be under investigation for money laundering. He was released on bail and placed under house arrest for a bribery attempt of an Israeli police official involved in the investigation. On September 17, 2014, Pinto was indicted on charges of attempting to bribe Ephraim Bracha of the Israeli national police in an attempt to gain information about the ongoing investigation of the financial activities of Hazon Yeshaya, a charitable organization Pinto heads. Bracha had reported the bribery attempt to his superior, Maj. Gen. Yoav Segalovich, and was ordered by Segalovich to pretend to accept the bribe. In February 2015, the Supreme Court upheld Pinto's plea agreement under which he would serve a maximum of one year in jail and become a state witness. He returned to Israel on April 14, and pleaded guilty the next day to bribing Bracha. Judge Oded Mudrick found him guilty of bribery, attempted bribery, and obstruction of justice. Bracha, who was cleared of any wrongdoing, committed suicide on July 5, 2015 after being subjected to a prolonged campaign of defamation. Pinto was sentenced on May 12, 2015, to one year in prison, and must pay a fine of 1 million shekels. Appeals of the prison sentence on the basis of ill health were declined on January 5 and February 8, 2016. He arrived at prison on February 16, 2016, after a brief stay in an Israeli hospital to check on and treat his medical conditions, including cancer. On August 3, President Reuven Rivlin rejected Pinto's appeal for clemency. His appeal for early release due to ill health, initially granted on September 19, was later overturned by the Lod District Court on September 26. He was released from prison on January 25, 2017, upon completion of his sentence.
