= DJ Akademiks =

Jamaican-American media personality

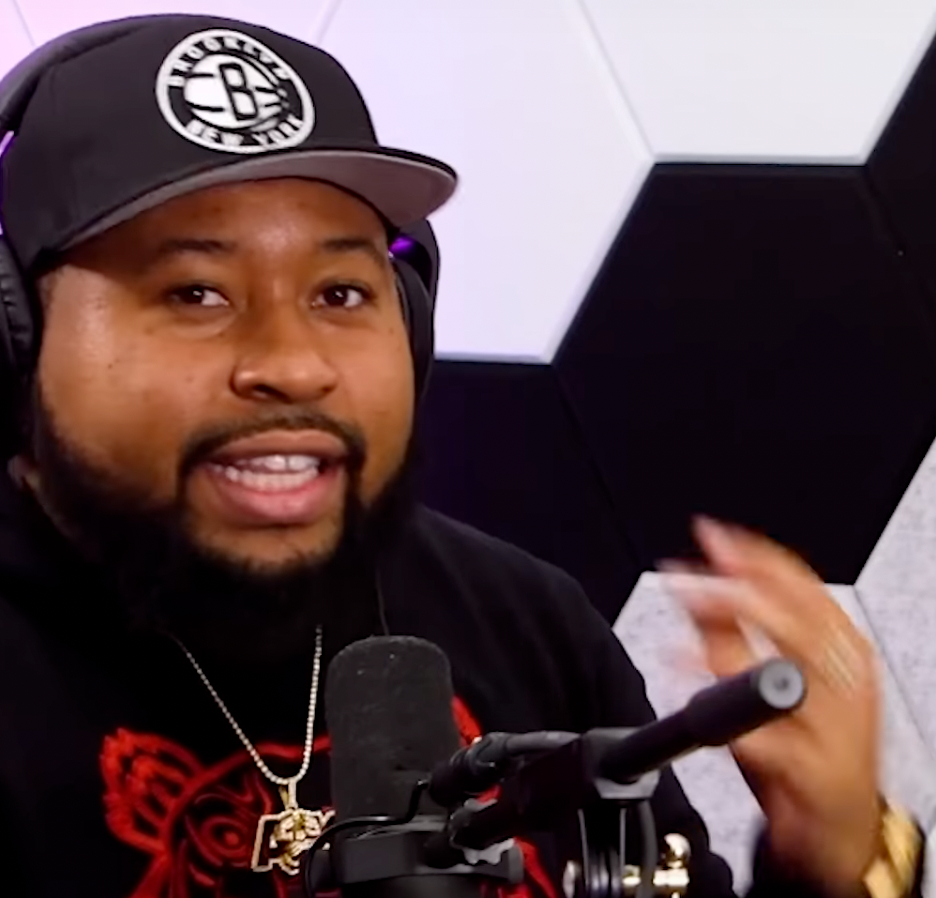
- DJ Akademiks in 2022
- Born: Livingston George Allen; Spanish Town, Jamaica
- Other names: Akademiks; Lil AK; Big AK; Mr. Chunky; The Prize; The Negrotiator
- Education: Rutgers University (BS)
- Occupations: Podcaster; YouTuber; online streamer

Twitch information
- Channel: Akademiks
- Years active: 2010–Present
- Genre: Reactions
- Followers: 593 thousand

YouTube information
- Channel: DJ Akademiks
- Subscribers: 2.83 million (DJ Akademiks); 1.01 million (King Akademiks)
- Views: 1.40 billion (DJ Akademiks); 543 million (King Akademiks)
- Last updated: March 21, 2026

Livingston George Allen, known professionally as DJ Akademiks (or simply Akademiks, or by his stage name Lil AK), is a Jamaican-American podcaster, YouTuber, live streamer, and media personality who covers hip-hop news and culture. After gaining fame on YouTube in the mid-2010s, he and rapper Joe Budden began co-hosting Everyday Struggle, a daily show by Complex Networks, in 2017. He also hosts the podcast Off the Record with DJ Akademiks on Spotify.

== Early life ==
Livingston George Allen was born in Spanish Town, Jamaica, and has two biological brothers. His father was a school principal and is stated to have had many extramarital affairs due to his affluent status in Jamaican society. DJ Akademiks did not appreciate his father's character of being away from his family, engaging in extramarital affairs and eventually starting another family, but he claims to have understood and forgiven him as he grew older.

DJ Akademiks mainly grew up under the care of his mother and his grandmother. Akademiks's mother left him and his brother back in Jamaica and migrated to the United States, where she worked many jobs, lived in sub-par conditions, and eventually paid an American man US$20,000 to marry her so she could legally become an American citizen as quickly as possible. In 2001, DJ Akademiks and his brother were invited over to the US by their mother.

== Career ==
=== Early career ===
DJ Akademiks was a regular on online hip-hop forums. His first YouTube channel titled DJ Akademiks created in October 2012 initially highlighted his university disc jockey sessions, interviews, and Hip-Hop/Rap opinions. Over time, he began posting the latest breaking news in the Hip-Hop/Rap genre. During this time, he operated a website titled Late Night Creep, which centred around Hip-Hop/Rap news but it is currently not operational.

=== 2014 ===
In May 2014, DJ Akademiks created a YouTube channel titled Crime Fails, which highlighted the mishaps committed by criminals during or after their criminal deeds.

In June 2014, DJ Akademiks created a YouTube channel titled The War in Chiraq, which mainly centered around the coverage of the various drill artists and updates on the underlying gang conflicts in Chicago, giving drill music lyrics context. The channel played a substantial role in rendering the early Chicago drill music scene accessible to a wider audience. It had a quarter million subscribers and 94 million views in its first two years.

=== 2015 ===
In February 2015, DJ Akademiks created a YouTube channel titled King Akademiks, where he solely posted highlight clips from his latest Twitch livestreams and began live streaming on in 2020.

In March 2015, DJ Akademiks created a YouTube channel titled Akademiks TV, where he posted noteworthy footage obtained from various musicians in the Hip-Hop/Rap genre. This footage did not feature any of DJ Akademiks' commentary.

In July 2015, DJ Akademiks uploaded a video to his first self-titled YouTube channel, stating that his channel had been suspended and that he was moving to a new channel, also titled DJ Akademiks where he continued posting Hip-Hop/Rap related news.

In August 2015, DJ Akademiks created a YouTube channel titled DJ Akademiks TV2 – The Negrotiator, which served as a backup for his newly created and now main channel DJ Akademiks, posting the same type of content but with a more critical and opinion-based touch. Since February 2023, this channel was primarily used to host and preserve full-length YouTube livestreams by DJ Akademiks and in September 2023, it was renamed to "The Akademy".

=== 2017–2020 ===
Aside from regularly posting and growing his DJ Akademiks YouTube channel, Instagram account, and Twitter account from April 2017 to December 2020, DJ Akademiks co-hosted Everyday Struggle, a daily morning show for Complex, with Joe Budden (eventually replaced by Star, and finally Wayno) and Nadeska Alexis. On the BET Awards pre-show on June 25, 2017, DJ Akademiks and his co-hosts interviewed Atlanta rap group Migos, where tensions arose between him, his co-host Joe Budden and late Migos member Takeoff, after Akademiks questioned his absence on Migos' 2016 single "Bad and Boujee".

In April 2018, DJ Akademiks launched his rapper alter-ego Lil AK, by posting a music video for his song "Blues Clues", which included a cameo from rapper 6ix9ine. The music video amassed 3.2 million views, as of January 2025. DJ Akademiks created a separate YouTube channel for his rapper alter-ego, titled Lil AK. He continued to release a string of songs and music videos up until September 2020.

In July 2020, DJ Akademiks was suspended from Complex for insulting model Chrissy Teigen while livestreaming on Twitch. Akademiks later apologized, stating "I think I definitely went over the line when I was disrespecting women." In November 2020, Akademiks announced he would be leaving Complex permanently.

=== 2021–present ===
In August 2021, DJ Akademiks launched his podcast, Off the Record with DJ Akademiks, in partnership with Spotify. It releases three episodes per week that center around roundtable discussions, and interviews with various Hip-Hop/Rap musicians and media personalities.

In September 2022, podcast host and former rapper Joe Budden criticized DJ Akademiks for sharing a video clip of rapper PnB Rock, speaking about being a potential robbery target, several days after PnB Rock had been shot to death in a robbery attempt. That same month, hip-hop pioneers LL Cool J, MC Lyte, Russell Simmons, and Spice 1 criticized DJ Akademiks for calling older rappers "dusty".

In April 2023, DJ Akademiks announced he would begin livestreaming on the video platform Rumble. DJ Akademiks said his intention to begin streaming exclusively on Rumble was due to the monetary offer he was provided and also for their lax moderation policies surrounding speech.

In 2024, during the Drake–Kendrick Lamar beef, DJ Akademiks publicly shared his continuous support for Canadian singer-rapper Drake. Lamar would reference him in "6:16 in LA", referring to him as "compromised".

== Occupational status ==
Akademiks is described by reliable sources as a media personality, broadcaster, and YouTuber rather than a journalist. The Daily Dot reported in 2015 that Akademiks "likened it less to carving out a journalistic niche than putting forward a brand." In December 2023, Nieman Lab published an article stating that "media influencers like DJ Akademiks have become the loudest voices in the Black media space; they are not real reporters." In June 2025, Billboard reported that Akademiks denied taking payola from Drake during the Drake–Kendrick Lamar feud, stating, "You can't buy my opinion."

== Personal life ==
DJ Akademiks has a bachelor's degree in biomathematics from Rutgers University. He was a disc jockey for the Rutgers University radio station WRSU-FM until 2013, when he was kicked out for his commentary and selection of music.

Akademiks has been described as a "fervent supporter of Donald Trump". In 2022, he stated he would "definitely" vote for Trump's campaign in the 2024 presidential election. He was the subject of controversy after reaffirming his support for Trump after he was convicted on 34 charges.

On May 14, 2024, a lawsuit was filed by Fauziya "Ziya" Abashe in the Superior Court of New Jersey against DJ Akademiks accusing him of rape, sexual assault, and defamation stemming from a July 2022 incident at DJ Akademiks' home.

In January 2025 in a Discord call during a Twitch stream, DJ Akademiks made explicit and sexual remarks to a male 15-year-old streamer, which received a high level of criticism. As reported by The Express Tribune:

In the 30-second video, Akademiks made a series of sexually explicit comments. At one point, he asked, "Yo, if Max said he wanted to try fucking a dude, will you let him fuck you?" Despite [the teen] clearly stating that he was not gay and was uncomfortable with the conversation, Akademiks continued to push the subject, further unsettling the teen.

== See also ==
- 6ixBuzz
- Adam22
- DJ Vlad
- Joe Budden
- The Shade Room
- WorldStarHipHop
