= Johan Lenox =

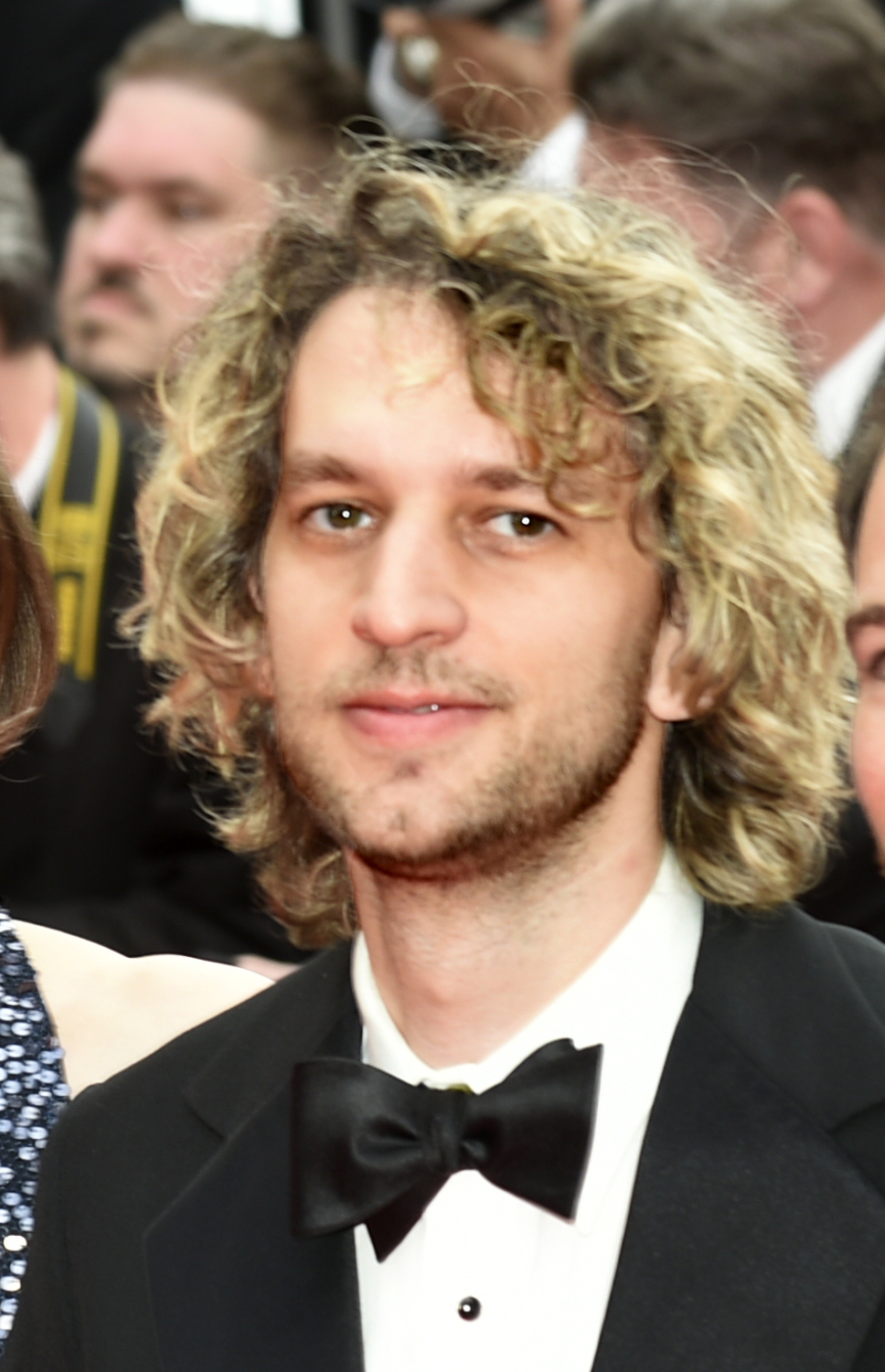
- Johan Lenox at the premier of The Plague during the Cannes Film Festival 2025

Background information
- Born: Stephen Michael Feigenbaum
- Genres: Alternative hip hop; ambient pop
- Occupations: Singer; producer; songwriter
- Years active: 2012–present
- Label: Independent

Stephen Michael Feigenbaum, known professionally as Johan Lenox, is an American singer, composer and producer. His musical style combines elements of pop, hip hop, and classical music. He began gaining attention for his production for high-profile artists like Travis Scott and Kanye West, among others. Since debuting in 2019, Lenox has released three studio albums.

== Early life ==
Feigenbaum was raised in Massachusetts. Considered a classical music prodigy from an early age, some of his compositions were performed at Boston's Symphony Hall and New York's Alice Tully Hall by the age of 18. He spent summers studying classical music at Tanglewood in Lenox, Massachusetts. He later spent six years at Yale University studying music. He was inspired upon hearing Kanye West's 2010 album, My Beautiful Dark Twisted Fantasy, seeing connections between Kanye's maximalist production style and classical music.

In 2012, Feigenbaum composed the music for Independents, a musical by Marina Keegan that premiered at the New York International Fringe Festival and was later staged at the SoHo Playhouse. The production was named a New York Times Critic's Pick, with reviewer Andy Webster praising Feigenbaum’s “folkish tunes” that evoked sea chanteys and a life of plunder.

== Career ==
=== 2016-2018: "Yeethoven" ===
Feigenbaum developed his stage name combining the names of composer Johannes Brahms and the town of Lenox, Massachusetts, where he studied classical music. Feigenbaum began receiving attention in 2016, co-creating and arranging music for a live orchestra event called "Yeethoven", a project that combines and compares the works of Kanye West and Beethoven. This project captured the attention of Time, Pitchfork, The Atlantic and artists like Vic Mensa and producer Mike Dean. Impressed by the work, Dean invited Feigenbaum to help produce for several West projects in 2018, including Nas' Nasir and Teyana Taylor's The Album.

=== 2019-2023: Solo work and work with Isomontrosity ===
In the subsequent years, Feigenbaum released a series of three projects under Island Records; Everybody's Cool but Me in 2019, Cancel the Party in 2020, and World on Fire in 2021. The song "Deep Reverence" by Big Sean received a nomination for Best Rap Performance at the 63rd Annual Grammy Awards, bringing Feigenbaum his first Grammy nomination. His fourth project, which he dubbed his "debut album", was released independently in 2022 and is titled WDYWTBWYGU (an acronym of What Do You Want to Be When You Grow Up), and features KayCyy, Ant Clemons, Mr. Hudson, 070 Shake, among others. In mid-2022, he joined 070 Shake as the opener for her nationwide tour for her second studio album, You Can't Kill Me.

At the end of the year, he released the debut album from Isomonstrosity, a collaborative group with Ellen Reid and Yuga Cohler, performed by International Contemporary Ensemble then chopped and rearranged with vocals added by artists including Danny Brown, Kacy Hill, and Empress Of. Released on the Brassland label, The Fader said it was "quite possibly the platonic ideal of a pandemic album."

A live orchestral version of the album WDYWTBWYGU was released on February 10, 2023 (titled Chamber WDYWTBWYGU), followed later that year on August 25, 2023, with Johan's Childhood Chamber Nostalgia Album, an orchestral instrumental album. His next album, I Guess We'll Find Out, was released on March 29, 2024.

== Discography ==
=== Studio albums ===
- WDYWTBWYGU (2022)
- Johan's Childhood Chamber Nostalgia Album (2023)
- I Guess We'll Find Out (2024)

==== With Isomonstrosity ====
- Isomonstrosity (2022)

=== Mixtapes ===
- Everybody's Cool but Me (2019)
- Cancel the Party (2020)
- World on Fire (2021)

=== Extended plays ===
- Chamber Johan (2021)
- Wilds (2017)
