= Everything I Am (Kanye West song) =

2007 song by Kanye West

Song by Kanye West featuring DJ Premier

from the album Graduation
- Released: September 11, 2007
- Recorded: 2007
- Studio: Avex (Honolulu); Sony Music (NYC); The Record Plant (Hollywood)
- Genre: Hip hop
- Length: 3:47
- Label: Roc-A-Fella; Def Jam
- Songwriters: Kanye West; Prince Phillip Mitchell; George Clinton, Jr.; Carlton Ridenhour; Eric Sadler; Hank Shocklee
- Producer: Kanye West

"Everything I Am" is a song by American rapper Kanye West from his third studio album, Graduation (2007). The song features guest scratches from DJ Premier and includes additional vocals from Tony "Penafire" Williams. It was written and produced by West, while Prince Phillip Mitchell, George Clinton, Chuck D, Eric Sadler, and Hank Shocklee received songwriting credits as their material was sampled. West received the song's beat from the recording sessions for Common's seventh studio album, Finding Forever (2007), as mentioned in the intro "Common passed on this beat, I made into a jam." DJ Premier recorded seven different scratching styles, crafting varied drum break rhythms at West's instruction. West set the song to be relatable for a schoolgirl who gets picked on, attempting to connect with Wendy Williams. A sparse hip hop ballad with soul, pop, and gospel elements, its riff relies on elements of Mitchell's "If We Can't Be Lovers". The song also includes elements of Public Enemy's "Bring the Noise" and both samples are combined with DJ Premier's scratches, appearing on the hook.

Lyrically, the song features West's self-examination of his insecurities that make him who he is and paraphrasing his vision of Mahatma Gandhi, "Everything you're not made you everything you are." "Everything I Am" received widespread acclaim from music critics, who often cited it as a highlight of the album. Some praised the composition and focused on DJ Premier's scratches, while reviewers generally praised West's rapping too. The song was certified platinum in the United States by the Recording Industry Association of America. West performed a medley of "Champion" with the song during the premiere for season 33 of Saturday Night Live in September 2007, breaking into a freestyle at the end. Solange Knowles used the latter for the basis of her song "Fuck the Industry" in 2010, eight years before a lawsuit was launched by Mitchell against both her and West for the unauthorized sampling of "If We Can't Be Lovers" on their songs. In the years since its inclusion on Graduation, the song's acceptance of what one lacks making them who they are has been noted for its influence.

== Background and conception ==
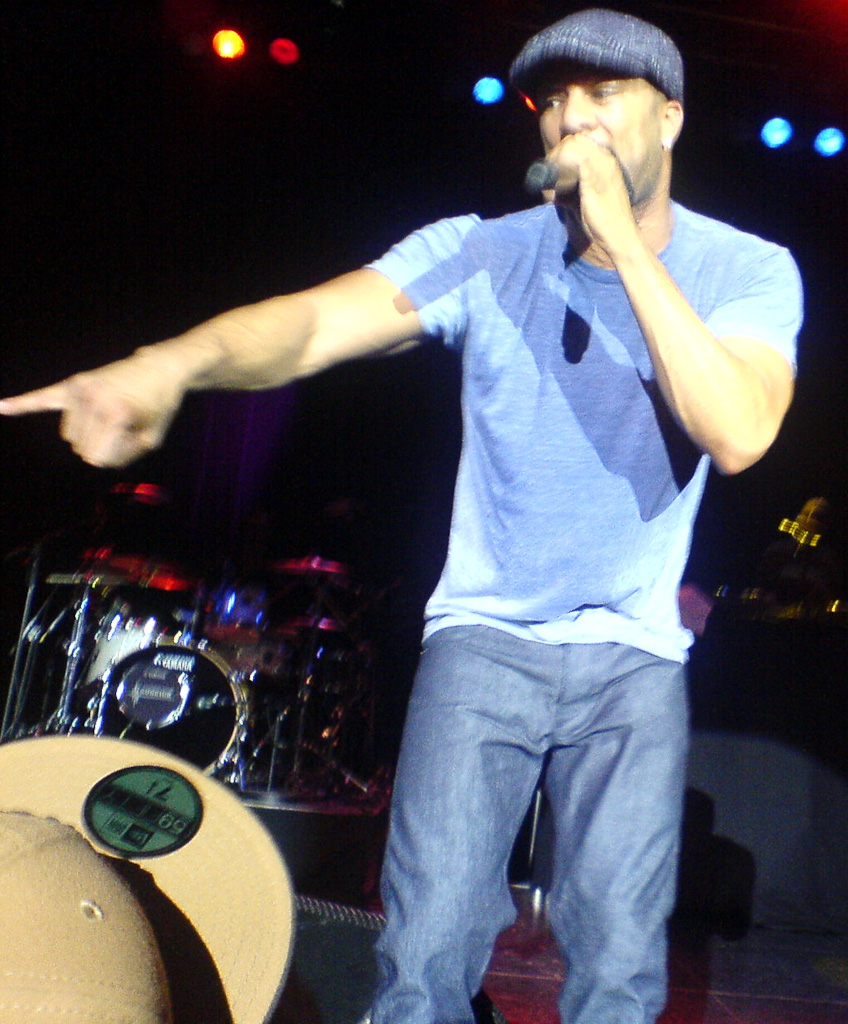
West received the song's beat from the 2007 recording sessions of Common's album Finding Forever, which the rapper mentions on the hook.

West received the song's beat from his fellow rapper and GOOD Music associate Common as he mentions in the lyrics; it was originally intended for his 2007 album Finding Forever that was released shortly before Graduation and was going through recording sessions at the time. Upon the album's release, Common did not regret giving West the beat since he felt he used any song which was meant to be and believes "in divine order", admitting that West made a better song than he would have as does happen sometimes. The beat for fellow album track "The Glory" was also an offer from Common and speaking retrospectively in 2024, the rapper said he passed on at least 10 beats to West over time. The song features a guest appearance from record producer DJ Premier, who Common references on Finding Forever when he dubs West "the new Preemo". "Everything I Am" was produced solely by West, who also wrote it and singer-songwriter Prince Phillip Mitchell was credited as a result of the sample of "If We Can't Be Lovers" (2004). Due to the sample of hip hop group Public Enemy's 1987 single "Bring the Noise", their members Chuck D, Eric Sadler, and Hank Shocklee received songwriting credits, in addition to George Clinton.

The track marked West and DJ Premier's first collaboration and they discussed it over the phone; the DJ told West he liked the lyrics and was impressed with the beat, though he wanted to contribute scratches. West gave DJ Premier varied instructions and he used seven different scratching styles, cutting drum breaks into alternate rhythms for the rapper to choose between his ideas throughout the song. After listening to an early version of "Everything I Am", DJ Premier brought the sample of "Bring the Noise" to the song. The track includes additional vocals from Tony "Penafire" Williams, marking the third consecutive West album that he appeared on. Speaking to Rolling Stone about the song in September 2007, West said he believed it "could relate to a girl in high school" who deals with being picked on. He characterized the hook as "a prophetic statement", resembling what Indian activist Mahatma Gandhi would have said if a person approached him to express everything wrong with themselves. West envisioned his response of telling them everything they are not made then everything they are, then suggesting: "Leave, my son." In October 2007, West said that he felt moved by an interview where media personality Wendy Williams cried quoting the song's title as she was so effected by it emotionally. He used the message of a schoolgirl being picked on to relate to Williams, offering either interpretation of a handicap from being "too skinny" then growing to be a model or "too big" then becoming a journalist like Oprah Winfrey.

== Composition and lyrics ==
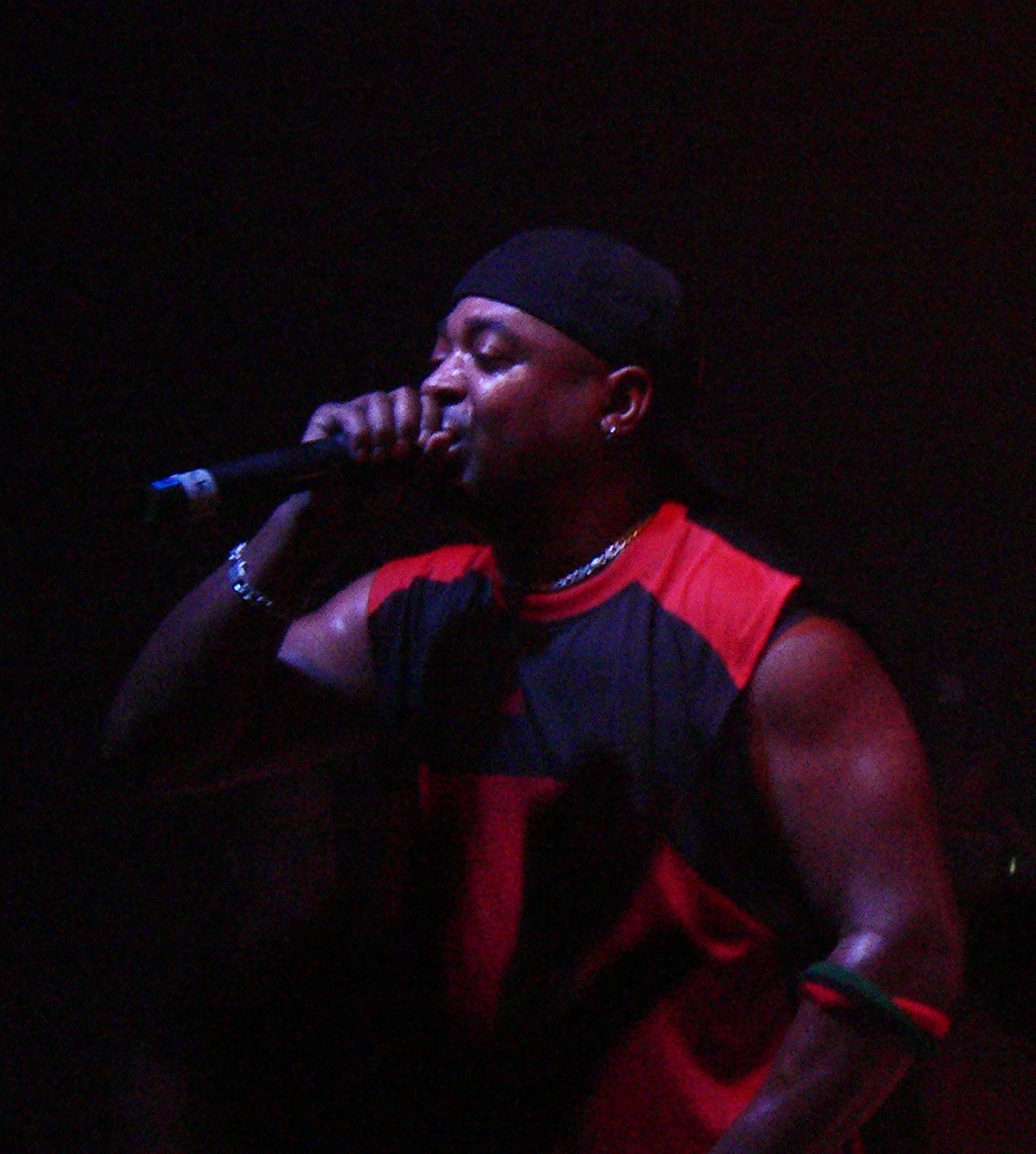
The song combines elements of Public Enemy's "Bring the Noise" with Prince Phillip Mitchell's "If We Can't Be Lovers" on its hook. This led to their then-members Chuck D, Eric Sadler, and Hank Shocklee being credited as songwriters, the first of whom is pictured above.

Musically, "Everything I Am" is a sparse hip hop ballad, with elements of soul, pop, and gospel music. The song incorporates piano and brief vocal elements from the first few seconds of "If We Can't Be Lovers" by Mitchell, adding a riff throughout and loops on the hook. It also features elements from Public Enemy's "Bring the Noise", which appear on the hook too and the single's line "here we go again" is used. DJ Premier solely contributes scratches, delivering these for the line and piano loops. The song utilizes a soft melody that consists of a Rhodes piano, bass guitar, and strings.

In the lyrics of "Everything I Am", West engages in self-examination as he recognizes his insecurities and that they make him the person he is. West raps "Everything I'm not made me everything I am" on the hook, paraphrasing how he imagined Gandhi telling someone: "Everything you're not made you everything you are." The hook also suggests West's answer to those questioning him combining different styles and uses this to define himself in opposition, while he acknowledges he received the beat from Common then "made it to a jam". West indicates the differences between himself and other musicians as he uses introspection on the first verse, admitting to never being as "picture perfect" as Beyoncé nor wearing seasonal clothes like fellow rappers Cam'ron and will.i.am. He later addresses the consequences of his outbursts at award shows, forgetting about the NAACP Image Awards and awards like those won by India Arie for the "Nigga, Please" or "I Gotta A Lotta Cheese" awards. The rapper attacks gangsta rap for promoting violence in the final verse as he compassionately mentions Chicago's endemic gun violence problem, which led to over 600 caskets in 2006.

== Release and promotion ==
"Everything I Am" was first previewed when the digital radio station BBC Radio 1Xtra hosted an "Audience With Kanye West" event at the BBC Radio Music Theatre in London on August 13, 2007. West guided a specially selected audience through Graduation, playing the album on his MacBook Air laptop via a speaker system. The song was also played by West during a listening session for the album at the New World Stages in Manhattan, New York, on August 28, 2007, with no video accompaniment on the screen. Inside an auditorium, West revealed his influences and aspirations. West played the songs from start-to-finish uninterrupted, with special programs of the lyrics handed out. On September 11, 2007, West's third studio album Graduation was released through his labels Roc-A-Fella and Def Jam, including "Everything I Am" as the tenth track.

"Everything I Am" was rarely performed during West's live sets. West performed a medley of the song with fellow album track "Champion" for the premiere to season 33 of Saturday Night Live (SNL) on September 29, 2007. He wore a red sweater, gold chain, and scarf for the performance, which featured red lights once he moved from the track into "Everything I Am". West mixed up summer with winter when rapping about Cam'ron and will.i.am, then broke into a freestyle as he admitted to having "just messed up on my rap, live TV like damn". The rapper also rapped that he meant to freestyle and "mess up", while he addressed his surprise at SNL allowing him to appear after his previous comments about 2001–2009 US President George W. Bush. For an October 2007 show with fellow rapper Ludacris at General Motors Place in Vancouver, Canada, West performed the song while assisted by back-up singers, a full orchestra, and DJ Reflex. West wore lime green pants, a medium T-shirt, a Cashmere scarf, and his shades for the performance.

== Reception ==
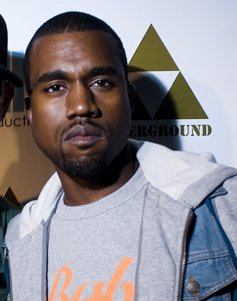
Numerous reviewers praised the vocals of West, whose lyricism and self-examination were mostly highlighted.

"Everything I Am" was met with widespread acclaim from music critics, with many selecting the song as a highlight of Graduation. Dave Heaton from PopMatters cited it as one of the album's two songs with "a timeless hip-hop feeling" that lives up to West's references to classic rap songs and artists, looking for a legacy as both a pop star and "a true-school MC". Heaton was impressed with the song's humbleness, citing the "piano-and-beats set-up" and DJ Premier's scratches. Entertainment Weekly's Neil Drumming viewed the sampled "slow, skewered piano riff" from "If We Can't Be Lovers" as a standout moment on the record, while he questioned how much of West's best material had been passed on from his mention of offering the "blissful instrumental" to Common. Japie Stoppelenburg from No Ripcord considered the song to be among the album's best tracks for following the formula of West's earlier work, calling it "a slow burning piano-and-strings ballad" that would fit on his 2004 debut The College Dropout. Writing for the Los Angeles Times, critic Ann Powers lauded DJ Premier's "artful scratches" on the standout ballad. Jesal "Jay Soul" Padania of Rap Reviews stated that the song is a highlight amongst the ending sequence and questioned why Common would pass on the "soulful beat", attributing its success to the DJ's "ever-fabulous scratching". At Hot Press, John Walshe picked the "confessional gospel-tinged" song as an album highlight where West uses philosophy and "self-deprecating humour" as he references subjects from awards shows to Chicago murders. For The Observer, Ben Thomas chose it as the best track on Graduation and highlighted West's bravery to directly confront his "back-to-basics self-examination". In LAS Magazine, Dan Weiss found that his character examination peaks on "the gorgeous, piano-flecked" number.

Critic Jayson Greene wrote for Stylus Magazine that the track moves away from West's "massive inferiority complex" towards him analyzing the aftermath of his outbursts, while he was endeared by the rapper's confession "I'll never be as laid back as this beat is". Greene further labeled the beat "a beautiful piece of soul-rap" with DJ Premier's scratches and recognized West does not forget about the rest of the world, being "as dogmatic as he cares" by comparing Chicago's caskets to his rapping. Chet Betz of Cokemachineglow felt that the track serves as West's answer to those surprised by his musical capability as he defines the opposite of himself with the hook, identifying a double meaning from the Elton John sample on fellow album track "Good Morning" of his inclusiveness spanning "beyond his own background and perspective". Betz was intrigued by the samples scratched by DJ Premier and the varied subject matter of West, who "separates himself from his peers" and brings intelligence with self-awareness to "a groaner concept". NME's Louis Pattison thought that "Everything I Am" helps redeem Graduation as the track starts "on a war tack", before softness and compassion are brought in as West acknowledges Chicago's caskets.

Despite a lack of commercial success, "Everything I Am" was certified platinum by the Recording Industry Association of America for amassing 1,000,000 certified units in the United States on May 31, 2023.

=== Lawsuit ===
American singer Solange Knowles released her single "Fuck the Industry" for digital download in May 2010, which is based around a sample of "Everything I Am". West and his co-writers on the original received songwriting credits on the single and since it maintains some of the elements of "If We Can't Be Lovers", Mitchell was also credited as a songwriter. In February 2018, Mitchell launched a lawsuit against West and Knowles that cited both the songs as using an unauthorized sample. The lawsuit sought punitive damages and argued that the artists "wilfully committed the infringement", insisting for the songs not to be performed live by them nor played on radio stations.

== Legacy ==
DJBooth expressed that West's acceptance on the track of what he lacks for making him the person he is should be taught in school systems in May 2015. In August 2016, West's then-wife Kim Kardashian listed it among her top 28 favorite tracks by him. Three months later, Billboard named "Everything I Am" as one of West's 13 most uplifting songs and Natalie Weiner primarily cited its refrain. Reflecting on the song in 2017 for the 10th anniversary of Graduation, Vice's Lawrence Burney said that its hook "became an almost ubiquitous Myspace screen name for teens and college-age kids". Burney believed that these youngsters developed into "the biggest stars in rap", not having learnt "the lessons Kanye taught on his genre-blending third album".

In 2017, DJBooth reflected that the song was West's "last comfortable moment" of peace in his ever-changing career. Matt Wilhite wrote that if the album was the transition to superstardom from his frustrated yet aspirational life, then the track was when the rapper ventured outside "to get away from the drunken laughter and loud music" for relaxing beneath the sky's stars. Wilhite found a stark contrast between the track and the vast majority of West's discography, declaring that "the lonesome piano keys" coming out over the light bassline and brief vocal samples from "If We Can't Be Lovers" created a "solemn yet hopeful" feel for its journey. He asserted that the track should have been kept by West "in a time capsule" for its "healthy resignations" of his limits so he could listen at his darkest moments, seeing the rapper had also gone through the fakeness he predicted in the lyrics. In October 2018, Uproxx cited West's admission on the song that "people wouldn't usually rap" about his casket numbers in Chicago as an example of him pushing hip hop's cultural boundaries.

== Credits and personnel ==
Information is taken from Graduation liner notes.

Recording

- Recorded at Avex Studio (Honolulu, HI), Sony Music Studios (NYC) and the Record Plant (Hollywood, CA)
- Mixed at Chung King Studios (NYC)

Personnel

- Kanye West – songwriter, producer
- Prince Phillip Mitchell – songwriter
- George Clinton, Jr. – songwriter
- Carlton Ridenhour – songwriter
- Eric Sadler – songwriter
- Hank Shocklee – songwriter
- DJ Premier – scratches
- Andrew Dawson – recorder
- Anthony Kilhoffer – recorder
- Mike Dean – mix engineer
- Bram Tobey – assistant mix engineer
- Jason Agel – assistant mix engineer
- Nate Hertweck – assistant mix engineer
- Anthony Palazzole – assistant mix engineer
- Andy Marcinowski – assistant mix engineer
- Omar Edwards – Rhodes
- Tony "Penafire" Williams – additional vocals
- Vincent "Biggs" James – bass guitar

== Certifications ==
Certifications for "Everything I Am"
Region	Certification	Certified units/sales
Denmark (IFPI Danmark)	Gold	45,000^{‡}
New Zealand (RMNZ)	Gold	15,000^{‡}
United States (RIAA)	Platinum	1,000,000^{‡}
^{‡} Sales+streaming figures based on certification alone.
