= You Can't Kill Me (disambiguation) =

You Can't Kill Me is a 2022 studio album by American singer-musician 070 Shake.

You Can't Kill Me may also refer to:

- "You Can't Kill Me", a song performed by Lene Lovich on the 1980 album Flex
- "You Can't Kill Me", a song performed by Nas on the 2006 album Hip Hop Is Dead
