= Modus Vivendi (070 Shake album) =

Studio album by 070 Shake
- Released: January 17, 2020
- Genres: Psychedelic; R&B; emo rap
- Length: 44:09
- Labels: GOOD; Def Jam
- Producers: Clyde Ellison; Dave Hamelin; dom$olo; Harry Mejias; Jimmy Shaw; Juan Brito; Kenneth Gamble; Leon Huff; Mike Dean; Myles William

070 Shake chronology
Glitter (2018)	Modus Vivendi (2020)	You Can't Kill Me (2022)

Singles from Modus Vivendi
- 1. "Morrow" Released: April 12, 2019; 2. "Nice to Have" Released: April 12, 2019; 3. "Under the Moon" Released: December 13, 2019; 4. "Guilty Conscience" Released: January 10, 2020

Modus Vivendi (Latin for "way of life") is the debut studio album by American alternative pop artist 070 Shake. It was released by GOOD Music and Def Jam on January 17, 2020. It was promoted by the singles "Morrow", "Nice to Have", "Under the Moon", and "Guilty Conscience" and features production from Mike Dean and indie rock musician Dave Hamelin, among others.

== Background and recording ==
In 2018, Shake released her debut EP, Glitter. In 2018, the New Jersey artist contributed vocals to Kanye West's Ye, Nas's Nasir, Pusha-T's Daytona, and Teyana Taylor's K.T.S.E. In 2019, she contributed to West's Jesus Is King, though her vocals are not present on the final album.

Shake announced her debut album on June 24, 2019. The press release stated that Modus Vivendi is "coming soon" on GOOD Music/Def Jam and that it would feature the previously released singles "Morrow" and "Nice to Have". Shake also announced a new tour behind the new record.

In an interview with Billboard, she stated that she retreated to a Los Angeles studio and recorded a hundred songs in just over a month with producers Dave Hamelin and Mike Dean.

The cover art was created by Sam Spratt, a New York-based illustrator.

== Critical reception ==
Professional ratings
Aggregate scores
Source	Rating
AnyDecentMusic?	7.4/10
Metacritic	80/100
Review scores
Source	Rating
Clash	8/10
Consequence of Sound	B+
Exclaim!	8/10
The Guardian	3/5 stars
HipHopDX	4/5
NME	4/5 stars
The Observer	4/5 stars
Pitchfork	7.3/10
Rolling Stone	4/5 stars

Modus Vivendi received critical acclaim. At Metacritic, which assigns a normalized rating out of 100 to reviews from mainstream publications, Modus Vivendi received a weighted average score of 80 based on 10 reviews, which indicates "generally favorable reviews". Aggregator AnyDecentMusic? gave the album a 7.4 out of 10 based on their assessment of the critical consensus.

Dhruva Balram of NME praised 070 Shake's lyricism and emotion, writing: "Shedding collaborations entirely, the album consists solely of 070 Shake's hypnotising hooks and shape-shifting vocals. It cements the 22-year-old as a unique artist, proving to everyone – and perhaps even herself – that she doesn't need anyone but her voice to vault herself to success. On Modus Vivendi, she manages to craft a sound that's anthemic, and built for festivals and clubs; but within the grooves, she's precise. Nothing feels out of place. This is project sculpted away from current trends." Reed Jackson of Pitchfork described the album as "intensely sincere, with the New Jersey native proudly serving her soul raw atop bullish, beautiful production", while stating that "it is the most compelling and complete release under G.O.O.D. Music since Pusha T's Daytona."

=== Accolades ===
Accolades for Modus Vivendi
Publication	Accolade	Rank	Ref.
Complex	Complex's Best Albums of 2020 – Mid-Year	49	
Gorilla vs. Bear	Gorilla vs. Bear's 25 Best Albums of 2020 – Mid-Year	10	
Mic Cheque	Mic Cheque's Best Albums of 2020 – End-of-Year	1	
Rolling Stone	Rolling Stone's 50 Best Albums of 2020 – Mid-Year	—N/a	

== Track listing ==
Credits are adapted from Tidal. On January 29, 2020, the stereo version of the album was re-uploaded with changes in track sequencing and mixing.

Modus Vivendi
No.	Title	Writer(s)	Producer(s)	Length
1.	"Don't Break the Silence"	Danielle Balbuena; Juan Brito	Juan Brito	1:44
2.	"Come Around"	Balbuena; Dave Hamelin; Alonso Irun; Anandji Shah; Kalyanji Shah	Dave Hamelin	1:36
3.	"Morrow"	Balbuena; Clyde Ellison; Harry Mejias; Mike Dean; Sean Solymar	Hamelin; Clyde Ellison; Harry Mejias; Mike Dean^{[b]}; Sean Solymar^{[b]}	4:06
4.	"The Pines"	Balbuena; Dean; Sarah Schachner	Dean; Sarah Schachner^{[b]}	3:33
5.	"Guilty Conscience"	Balbuena; Ben King; Jerry Leiber; Mike Stoller; Mitchell Ahn; Myles Moraites; Randolph Newman; William Moraites	Myles William	3:33
6.	"Divorce"	Balbuena; Dean; Hamelin; Carlos Valdes	Hamelin; Dean^{[b]}	3:39
7.	"It's Forever" (performed by the Ebonys)	Leon Huff	Kenneth Gamble; Leon Huff	0:17
8.	"Rocketship"	Balbuena; Hamelin; Solymar; Claude Debussy; Isao Tomita	Hamelin; Solymar^{[b]}	3:04
9.	"Microdosing"	Balbuena; Hamelin	Hamelin	3:39
10.	"Nice to Have"	Balbuena; Dean; Hamelin; Solymar; Ronjae England	Hamelin; Dean^{[a]}; Solymar^{[b]}	3:52
11.	"Under the Moon"	Balbuena; Hamelin; Solymar	Hamelin; Solymar^{[b]}	3:27
12.	"Daydreamin"	Balbuena; Solymar; Dominic Lopez	dom$olo; Solymar^{[b]}	2:48
13.	"Terminal B"	Balbuena; Hamelin; Francis Starlite	Hamelin; Francis and the Lights^{[a]}; Solymar^{[b]}	5:30
14.	"Flight319"	Balbuena; Hamelin; Irun; A. Shah; K. Shah; Jimmy Shaw	Hamelin; Jimmy Shaw	3:21
Total length:				44:09

Modus Vivendi — Initial stereo release (January 17–29, 2020) and surround sound version
No.	Title	Length
1.	"Don't Break the Silence"	1:44
2.	"Come Around"	1:36
3.	"Morrow"	4:06
4.	"It's Forever" (performed by the Ebonys)	0:17
5.	"Rocketship"	3:04
6.	"Divorce"	3:39
7.	"The Pines"	3:33
8.	"Guilty Conscience"	3:33
9.	"Microdosing"	3:39
10.	"Nice to Have"	3:52
11.	"Under the Moon"	3:27
12.	"Daydreamin"	2:48
13.	"Terminal B"	5:30
14.	"Flight319"	3:21
Total length:		44:09

Notes

- ^{^[a]} signifies a co-producer
- ^{^[b]} signifies an additional producer

Sample credits

- "The Pines" contains an interpolation of "In the Pines", a traditional folk song.
- "It's Forever" contains samples of "It's Forever", written by Kenneth Gamble and Leon Huff and performed by the Ebonys.
- "Rocketship" contains samples of "Snowflakes Are Dancing", written by Claude Debussy and performed by Isao Tomita.
- "Guilty Conscience" contains samples of "Stand by Me", written by Ben E. King, Jerry Leiber, and Mike Stoller and performed by Ben E. King.

== Personnel ==
Musicians

- Dave Hamelin – bass guitar (10, 11), guitar (8–11, 13), keyboards (8, 9, 11), synthesizer (2, 6), tambourine (11)
- dom$olo – keyboards (12)
- Francis and the Lights – programmer (13)
- Gitai Vinshtock – guitar (10)
- Isaiah Gage – cello (1, 13)
- Joel Shearer – guitar (1, 13)
- Juan Brito – keyboards (1, 8)
- Justus West – guitar (6)
- Mike Dean – bass guitar (6), drums (4), guitar (4), keyboards (8), piano (6), synthesizer (6, 9, 11, 12)
- Sarah Schachner – cello (4), string arranger (4), strings (4), viola (4), violin (4)
- Sean Solymar – guitar (3, 12), keyboards (11, 12), piano (3, 13)
- Stephen Feigenbaum – string arranger (13)
- Timmy Manson Jr. – keyboards (13)
- William Moraites – bass guitar (5)
- Yasmeen Al-Mazeedi – strings (1), violin (10, 13)

Technical

- Adrián Meléndez – recording engineer (5)
- Brian Chirlo – recording engineer (5)
- Dave Hamelin – recording engineer (1, 2, 6, 8, 9, 11, 13, 14)
- Jenna Felsenthal – recording engineer (1–3, 6, 8–14)
- Joe Tarsia – recording engineer (7)
- Juan Brito – recording engineer (5)
- Mike Dean – mastering engineer (1–6, 8–14), mixer (1–6, 8–14), recording engineer (4)
- Pat Rosario – recording engineer (5)
- Sean Solymar – assistant mixer (1–6, 8–14)

== Instrumental version ==
On June 26, 2020, an instrumental version of the album, called Modus Vivendi: Instrumental Selections, was released through digital retailers. The instrumental album contains the instrumental versions of ten songs from the original album.

Modus Vivendi: Instrumental Selections
No.	Title	Length
1.	"Don't Break the Silence"	1:54
2.	"Morrow"	4:12
3.	"The Pines"	3:38
4.	"Guilty Conscience"	3:36
5.	"It's Forever" (performed by the Ebonys)	0:17
6.	"Microdosing"	3:50
7.	"Nice to Have"	3:56
8.	"Under the Moon"	3:33
9.	"Daydreamin"	2:54
10.	"Terminal B"	5:41
Total length:		33:31

== Charts ==
Chart performance for Modus Vivendi
Chart (2020)	Peak position
US Heatseekers Albums (Billboard)	10
US Top Current Album Sales (Billboard)	70
