= Some of My Best Rappers Are Friends =

- Album artwork for The World Famous Tony Williams' second studio mixtape, Some Of My Best Rappers Are Friends.

Studio album / mixtape by The World Famous Tony Williams
- Released: January 13, 2012
- Genre: R&B
- Label: The High Society
- Producers: BINK; Warryn Campbell; Mike Cash; Keezo Kane; Count Justice; Chardy Roc; Picnic Tyme; SMKA; Oddz N Endz

The World Famous Tony Williams chronology
Finding Dakota Grey (2010)	Some of My Best Rappers Are Friends (2012)	King or the Fool (2012)

Singles from Some of My Best Rappers Are Friends
- 1. "Marsha Braidy" Released: December 30, 2011; 2. "Blazin High" Released: January 6, 2012; 3. "Caught Up" Released: January 13, 2012

Some of My Best Rappers Are Friends is the second mixtape by American R&B and soul recording artist The World Famous Tony Williams, released for free on January 13, 2012. It was presented by The Source Magazine, YouHeardThatNew.com & CloudKicker Clothing. Some of My Best Rappers Are Friends features guest appearances from Kanye West, Macklemore, Wale, Big K.R.I.T., Outlawz, Emilio Rojas, Freddie Gibbs, King Chip, GLC, STS, Mama Sol, Mickey Factz, Fonzworth Bentley, Kyle Lucas, CyHi The Prynce, Vonnegutt, Naledge, Gary the Storyteller, Fred Nukes and Kid Daytona.

== Theme ==
Tony Williams crafted this project to advocate for genuine R&B music. Staying true to his "World Famous" moniker, Tony included collaborations with some of his world renowned contacts, who just so happen to make music, to add to his second studio project. The cover art includes animated graphics of some of his most prominent friends who he has made music with ranging from Big Sean and Rick Ross to legends like Kanye West and Jay Z.

== Critical reception ==
Upon its release, Some of My Best Rappers Are Friends has received favorable reviews from music critics. Rose Lilah of Hot New Hip Hop noted, "It's a worthy addition to a catalogue that has seen much growth since Tony Williams stepped foot in the rap game." Mizz E at You Heard That New addressed the project as "... a little present for your listening pleasure. Multiple publications raved about Another You which consequently featured the first written verse from Kanye West post Taylor Swift controversy. Bossip named Another You "One of the 10 Most Slept-On Songs of 2012. Complex named the feature by Kanye West on Another You one of the "20 Best Guest Verses of 2012 (So Far)." Singers Room included Another You in their list of the "40 Songs that Went Under the Radar in 2012".

== Track listing ==
From TheSource.

#	Song	Time	Featured guest(s)	Producer(s)
1	I'll Do Ya	3:54		Mike Cash
2	WKNG Radio Interlude #1	1:04		
3	This Place	4:19		Warryn Campbell
4	WKNG Radio Interlude #2	0:49		
5	Blazin High	3:52	Wale, Emilio Rojas, Macklemore	
6	Tunnel Vision	2:29	Big K.R.I.T.	Mike Cash
7	Cloud of Endo	5:20	STS & Freddie Gibbs	
8	WKNG Radio Interlude #3	1:08		
9	Priceless	4:33		Keezo Kane
10	WKNG Radio Interlude #4	1:21		
11	Hero In the Morning	4:35	Mama Sol & Mickey Factz	The AveNJerz
12	You Got Soul	3:47	Mama Soul	
13	Marsha Braidy	4:04	Fonzworth Bentley & King Chip	
14	WKNG Radio Interlude #5	1:20		
15	Caught Up	6:26	STS, Kyle Lucas & CyHi The Prynce	
16	WKNG Radio Interlude #6	1:18		
17	Not the One	4:10	GLC	Count Justice
18	WKNG Radio Interlude #7	0:55		
19	Put Me Back Together	3:29	Vonnegutt & Naledge	
20	WKNG Radio Interlude #8	2:12		
21	Rainy Day	3:29	Gary the Storyteller	
22	WKNG Radio Interlude #9	0:30		
23	Everything About You	4:02		
24	WKNG Radio Interlude #10	0:57		
25	Sleepover	1:21		Chardy Roc
26	WKNG Radio Interlude #11	0:59		
27	Another You	1:09	Kanye West	BINK
28	WKNG Radio Interlude #12	0:22		
29	Fly Away	3:36	Fred Nukes	
30	WKNG Radio Interlude #13	0:49		
31	Remember Me	3:28	Outlawz	
32	Camelot	6:00	The Kid Daytona	
