= South Anchorage High School =

Location
- 13400 Elmore Road; Anchorage, Alaska 99516; United States; 61°06′01″N 149°48′30″W

Information
- Type: Public secondary
- Established: 2004 (22 years ago)
- School district: Anchorage School District
- CEEB code: 020365
- Principal: Luke Almon
- Teaching staff: 57.79 (FTE)
- Grades: 9–12
- Enrollment: 1,286 (2023–2024)
- Student to teacher ratio: 22.25
- Colors: Black and gold
- Nickname: Wolverines
- Newspaper: Southside Story (discontinued)
- Yearbook: Southside Perennial
- Website: www.asdk12.org/south

South Anchorage High School is a public high school that serves grades 9-12 in Anchorage, Alaska, as well as students from neighboring Turnagain Arm communities of Girdwood and Indian. South Anchorage High School is part of the Anchorage School District, and opened in the fall of 2004. The official school colors of South are black and gold, and its mascot is the wolverine. As of November 25, 2016, the school had an enrollment of 1,459.

== General information ==
The majority of students come from Goldenview Middle School and Mears Middle School. The schedule varies throughout the week, starting later on Monday, as well as block periods during the week. On Monday and Friday there are 6 classes, each divided into 43 minute periods on Monday and 52 minute periods on Friday. A blocking schedule is used on Tuesday, Wednesday, and Thursday, with each class lasting for 81 minutes. On Tuesday students attend periods 1, 2, 4, and 5; Wednesday students attend periods 2, 3, 5, and 6; Thursday, students attend periods 1, 3, 4, and 6. Lunch on Monday is 41 minutes, and on Tuesday, Wednesday, Thursday, and Friday lunch is 46 minutes long. On assembly days, class periods are shortened to make time at the end of the day.

== Statistics ==
As of 2008, 1,730 students were enrolled at South Anchorage High School, and 89 teachers were employed, 52% with advanced degrees.

For the 2008-2009 school year, 8.44% of the students were reported as "economically disadvantaged," compared to a district average of 35.58%. 2008-2009 demographic information from the Anchorage School District reported South Anchorage to be 75% white, 2% black, 7% Hispanic, 7% Asian/Pacific Islander, 6% American Indian/Alaska Native, and 4% multi-ethnic. District averages for high schools are 53% white, 6% black, 7% Alaska Native/American Indian, 14% Asian/Pacific Islander, 9% Hispanic and 10% multi-ethnic.

For the 2008-2009 school year, graduation rate was 83.99%, compared to a district average of 69.40%. On the Alaska High School Graduation Qualifying Examination (HSGQE), South Anchorage had a 95.13% proficiency rate in Reading (district average 91.54%), 89.32% in Writing (district average 80.15%), and 92.29% in Mathematics (district average 82.44%) among 10th graders. (The HSGQE is initially administered in 10th grade, and retaken in subsequent semesters by students who didn't achieve proficiency in any of the three categories.)

== Building ==
The school consists of two floors, with the heating system as the third floor. There is a full size gym with an upstairs track, and a smaller gym. There is a weight room and a physical therapy room. Students eat lunch in the commons, a large opening in the middle of the school. There are alphabetically ordered halls (A - H) and a large library next to the front office. Students order lunch from the cafeteria near F hall or order at the café near E hall.

== Notable staff and alumni ==
- David Bullock, Tech entrepreneur and media executive
- Jonny Homza, Professional baseball player
- Caitlin Patterson, Olympic cross-country skier
- Scott Patterson, Olympic cross-country skier
- Jordan Pearce, former professional ice hockey goaltender
- Jeremy Swayman, current professional ice hockey goaltender (Boston Bruins)
- Edefuan Ulofoshio, NFL player
