= David Bullock (entrepreneur) =

American tech entrepreneur and media executive

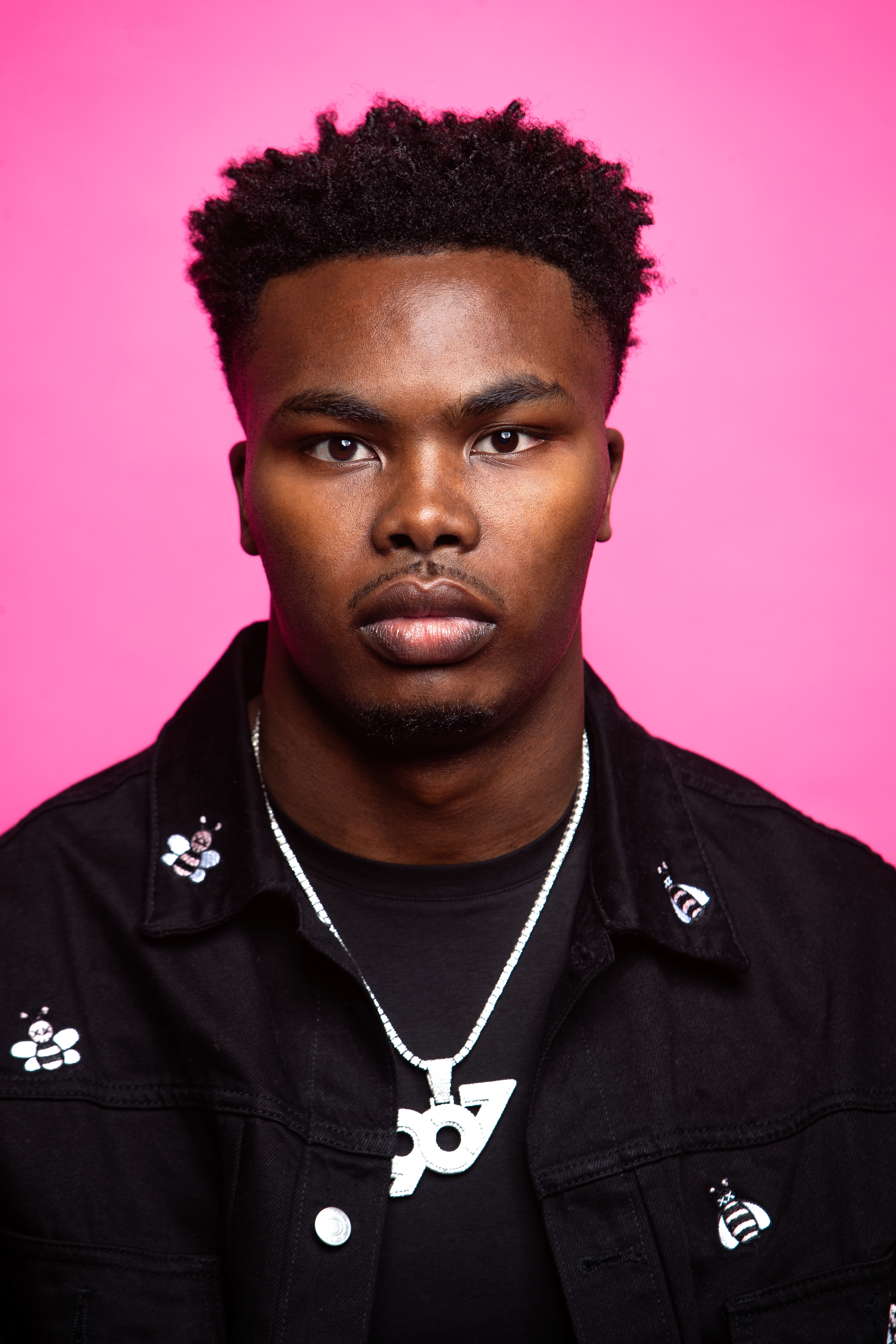
- Bullock in 2020
- Born: June 15, 1993 (age 33); Anchorage, Alaska, U.S.
- Other name: Alaska
- Education: South Anchorage High School; Howard University
- Occupations: Businessman; talent manager
- Website: davidbullock.co

David Bullock (born June 15, 1993), also known by the nickname Alaska, is an American businessman media executive, and talent manager.

In 2017, Bullock founded a digital marketing and tech company, 907 Agency.

== Early life ==
Bullock is the youngest of seven children. He attended South Anchorage High School as an All-Conference basketball player before following his older brother Wesley to attend Howard University in Washington, DC.

== Career ==
In 2014, Bullock was recognized at #81 on the list of the "Top 100 Most Influential Black People on Digital/ Social Media" by Eelan Media.

Bullock made his national television debut on the premiere episode of Time's Up!, which aired on Music Television in 2014.

In early 2015, Bullock collaborated with The World Famous Tony Williams to coordinate the "Some of My Best Rappers Are Friends" music showcase at the SXSW Music Festival. The following year, he traveled North America working on Kanye West's Saint Pablo Tour. Since then, he has attended Kanye West's "Sunday Service" gatherings, with his tweets from the events being used in news articles on multiple occasions.

In 2017, he was named to the "HBCU Top 30 Under 30" listing by HBCU Buzz.

In 2018, he was awarded Anchorage, Alaska's highest honor, equivalent to the key of the city, due to his work in the music industry. That same year, GQ referred to him as a "prominent black entrepreneur" and he was named to the list of the "100 Most Influential People of African Descent under the age of 40" by a committee in support of the United Nations Decade Of African Descent.

In 2018, 907 Agency announced a mobile gaming app, World Famous. Bullock helped produce Sean Combs' 2018 CombsFest "Bermuda Dunes bash". He is currently The World Famous Tony Williams' manager. In 2020, he was named by Forbes magazine to Forbes 30 Under 30 for 2021 in its marketing and advertising category. In 2024, Bullock was named associate producer for the Kanye West documentary In Whose Name? Two years later, he was a two-time nominee for the Snapchat first annual Snappy Awards under the "Top Lifestyle Creator" and "One to Watch" categories.
