= 070 Shake =

American rapper (born 1997)

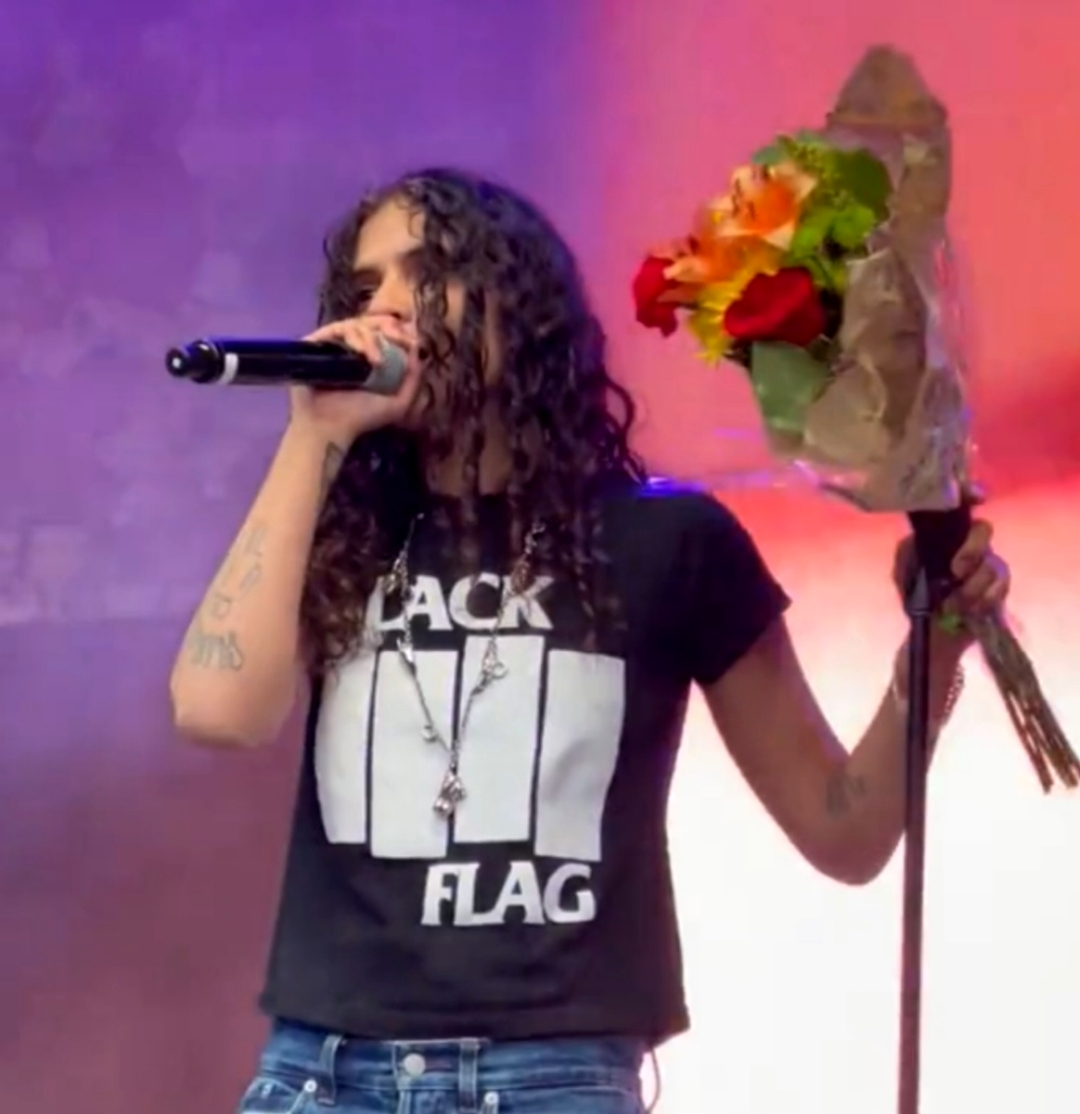
- 070 Shake in 2023

Background information
- Born: Daniella Balbuena; North Bergen, New Jersey, U.S.
- Genres: Alternative hip-hop; pop rap; psychedelic music
- Occupations: Rapper; singer; songwriter; actress
- Years active: 2015–present
- Labels: GOOD; Def Jam
- Member of: 070
- Website: 070shake.com

YouTube information
- Channel: 070Shake
- Genre: Music
- Subscribers: 325 thousand
- Views: 106.1 million
- Last updated: September 12, 2026

Danielle Balbuena, known professionally as 070 Shake (pronounced "oh seven oh shake"), is an American rapper, singer, songwriter, and actress. They are best known for their guest appearance on American rapper Kanye West's 2018 track "Ghost Town", which peaked at number 16 on the Billboard Hot 100 and was certified double platinum.

In 2016, they signed with rapper Kanye West's record label GOOD Music, an imprint of Def Jam Recordings. Their debut extended play (EP), Glitter (2018), preceded further attention in June of that year for their guest appearances on West's songs "Ghost Town" and "Violent Crimes"—both of which peaked within the top 40 of the Billboard Hot 100 and appear on West's eighth album, Ye. During that same month, Balbuena guest performed on labelmate Pusha T's album Daytona and New York rapper Nas' album Nasir. Their debut studio album, Modus Vivendi (2020), and its follow-up, You Can't Kill Me (2022), were both positively received by music critics despite failing to chart.

Aside from their solo career, Balbuena is also a member of the New Jersey–based musical collective 070, from which she adapted her stage name. The group has released one mixtape, The 070 Project: Chapter 1 (2016).

== Early life and education ==
Balbuena was born in North Bergen, New Jersey, and is of Dominican descent. Balbuena attended North Bergen High School, where she played on the school's basketball team. Prior to her music career, Balbuena wrote poetry.

== Career ==
=== 2015–2016: Early years ===
Shake began her music career in late 2015, recording the songs "Proud" and "Swervin". Shake's stage name is derived from her affiliation with the 070 music collective with 070 coming from New Jersey's 070 ZIP Codes. By 2018, the 070 crew was noted to have 11 members, including artists and producers.

By 2016, Shake was receiving hundreds of thousands of streams on SoundCloud. Soon after posting several songs on SoundCloud, Shake attracted the attention of Miami-based promoter and social media personality YesJulz. After hearing "Proud", YesJulz reached out to Shake on Twitter and signed on to be her manager. Shake had a breakthrough with "Trust Nobody", released early in that year. In August 2016, Shake collaborated with fellow 070 members Ralphy River, Hack, and Treee Safari on the single "Honey". The song featured production from frequent collaborators, The Kompetition, a three-person production group. "Honey" simultaneously premiered on Complex and 1 AM Radio on Dash. Vibe commented that the track "[sounded] tailor-made to rock on dance floors everywhere."

In 2016, Shake signed with Kanye West's GOOD Music label. GOOD Music found out about Shake through Julz, who played some of Shake's music at a Yeezy fitting, which caught the attention of the label's president, Pusha T. After signing Shake, the label picked up her "Trust Nobody" track and re-released it in September. Shake spent October and November opening for English rock band The 1975 during the American leg of their 2016 tour. On December 8, 2016, 070 released her first mixtape, The 070 Project: Chapter 1.

=== 2017–present: Glitter, Modus Vivendi, You Can't Kill Me and Petrichor ===
Shake modeled for Gypsy Sport's Fall 2017 runway show. She also went on her first headlining tour in April. In a 2017 interview with Paper, Shake mentioned her Yellow Girl EP would release later that year. However, the project was rescheduled to release after Glitter, another collaboration with The Kompetition.

Her solo debut, the 6-track EP Glitter, was released on March 23, 2018, although it was originally slated for a January release and to include 12 tracks. At the time of Glitter's release, media outlets noted that her lyrical content concentrated on her self-esteem issues, drug use, and sexuality. Shake described Glitter as "about being in a dark place and finding yourself and figuring it out. It's about being in the lowest of lows type of shit." Shortly prior to Glitter's release, Shake performed at the SXSW music festival.

In May 2018, Shake was featured on "Santeria", a track from Pusha T's album Daytona.

Shake was a featured vocalist on "Ghost Town" and "Violent Crimes" from Kanye West's album Ye. Michael Saponara praised the two tracks as "standout cuts" on West's album, and ranked "Ghost Town" as the album's best song. HotNewHipHop praised Shake's performance on "Ghost Town" as the highlight of the song and called the track the climax of the album. Shake told Pigeons & Planes that "Ghost Town" was nearly left off Ye, as the track was finished on the same day of the album's release. Shake's recording experience with West in Wyoming for his album Ye impacted her thoughts about Yellow Girl; she stated, "I don't know if it's going to be called Yellow Girl. I know the songs are definitely changing. The experience I had in Wyoming makes me want to make music on a different level."

In 2019, she featured on DJ Khaled's album Father of Asahd alongside Buju Banton, Sizzla, and Mavado on the song "Holy Mountain".

Shake released her debut album, Modus Vivendi, on January 17, 2020. Her second studio album, You Can't Kill Me was released in June 2022. Its first single, "Lose My Cool" featuring NLE Choppa, was released on December 3, 2021.

In the summer of 2022, Shake accompanied American rapper Kid Cudi on his To the Moon World Tour as an opening act. In October 2022, Shake was featured on the song "Escapism" by Raye. After going viral on TikTok, the song charted internationally and became Shake's first song to chart on the Billboard Hot 100.

Shake was part of the lineup for the 22nd Coachella Valley Music and Arts Festival in April 2023.

Her third studio album, Petrichor was released on November 15, 2024.

== Musical style and influences ==
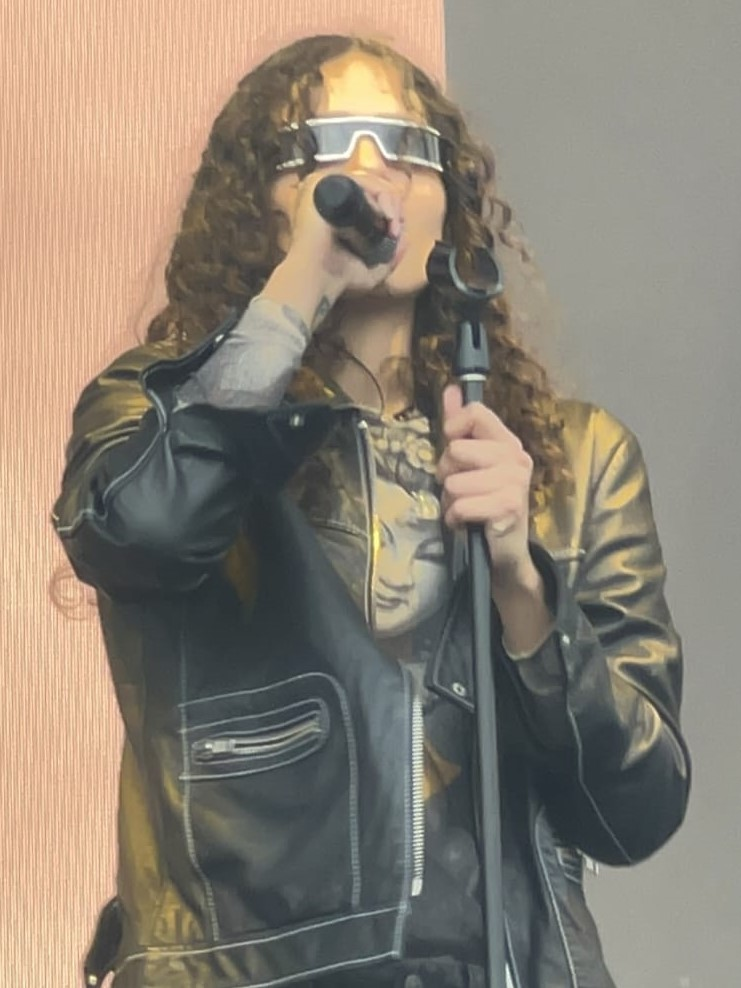
070 Shake performing in 2023 at the Governors Ball Music Festival

Her musical style has been described as pop, alternative, ambient, and hip-hop. Shake has cited Kanye West, Kid Cudi, Michael Jackson, Lauryn Hill, Paramore, and My Chemical Romance as artists who have inspired her music.

== Personal life ==
Shake uses she/her pronouns when describing lovers in her music. A 2017 Vogue essay on rising queer stars in rap music mentioned Shake's sexuality and included an Instagram image of her with her then-girlfriend. In a 2018 Pitchfork article, Shake said she does not label her sexuality, saying "I don't really identify myself as queer or gay or anything. I just like girls." She was in a relationship with singer Kehlani from 2021 to 2022.

Since January 2023, she has been in a relationship with actress-model Lily-Rose Depp.

== Discography ==
=== Studio albums ===
Title	Details	Peak chart positions	
Title	Details	US Current	US Heat
Modus Vivendi	Released: January 17, 2020; Label: GOOD, Def Jam; Formats: LP, digital download	70	10
You Can't Kill Me	Released: June 3, 2022; Label: GOOD, Def Jam; Formats: LP, digital download	—	6
Petrichor	Released: November 15, 2024; Label: GOOD, Def Jam; Formats: LP, digital download	—	—

=== Extended plays ===
Title	Details
Glitter	Released: March 23, 2018; Label: GOOD, Def Jam; Formats: Digital download

=== Mixtapes ===
Title	Details
The 070 Project: Chapter 1 (with 070)	Released: December 8, 2016; Label: I am Ent, Empire; Formats: Digital download

=== Instrumental albums ===
Title	Details
Modus Vivendi (Instrumental Selections)	Released: June 26, 2020; Label: GOOD, Def Jam; Formats: Digital download

=== Singles ===
==== As lead artist ====
Title	Year	Certifications	Album
"Make It There"	2016		Non-album singles
"Sunday Night" (featuring Phi)	2016		Non-album singles
"Bass for My Thoughts"	2016		Non-album singles
"Them Dead" (with 070 Phi, 070 Razsy Beats & Ralphy River)	2016		Non-album singles
"Honey" (with Ralphy River and Hack & Tree)	2016		The 070 Project: Chapter 1
"Trust Nobody"	2016		Non-album singles
"Rewind" (featuring Lil Yachty)	2016		Non-album singles
"Stranger"	2017		Glitter
"Be Myself"	2017		Non-album singles
"Accusations"	2018		Non-album singles
"Morrow"	2019		Modus Vivendi
"Nice to Have"	2019		Modus Vivendi
"Under the Moon"	2019		Modus Vivendi
"Guilty Conscience"	2020	RIAA: Gold	Modus Vivendi
"Fish On Land"	2020		Non-album single
"Lose My Cool" (featuring NLE Choppa)	2021		Non-album single
"Skin and Bones"	2022		You Can't Kill Me
"Web"	2022		You Can't Kill Me
"Body" (with Christine and the Queens)	2022		You Can't Kill Me
"Black Dress"	2023		Non-album singles
"Natural Habitat" (featuring Ken Carson)	2023		Non-album singles
"Winter Baby / New Jersey Blues"	2024		Petrichor
"If You're Free"	2026		TBA

==== As featured artist ====
List of singles as featured artist, with selected chart positions
Title	Year	Peak chart positions									Certifications	Album
Title	Year	US	US Dance	AUS	CAN	IRE	NL	NZ Hot	SWE	UK	Certifications	Album
"Sweetest Heartbreak" (XAXO featuring 070 Shake)	2017	—	—	—	—	—	—	—	—	—		Non-album single
"Kobe" (FOREVER ANTi PoP featuring 070 Shake)	2018	—	—	—	—	—	—	—	—	—		Smells Like Homeless Fart
"My Night" (Keys N Krates featuring 070 Shake)	2018	—	—	—	—	—	—	—	—	—		Cura
"Trumpets" (by.ALEXANDER featuring 070 Shake)	2020	—	—	—	—	—	—	—	—	—		000 Channel Black
"Lifetime" (Swedish House Mafia featuring Ty Dolla Sign and 070 Shake)	2021	—	9	—	—	—	—	19	35	—		Paradise Again
"Frozen (070 Shake remix)" (Madonna vs. Sickick featuring 070 Shake)	2022	—	10	—	—	—	—	—	—	—		Non-album remix
"Escapism" (Raye featuring 070 Shake)	2022	22	—	3	9	1	4	1	4	1	RIAA: Platinum; ARIA: 6× Platinum; BPI: 2× Platinum; GLF: Platinum; MC: 5× Platinum; RMNZ: 3× Platinum	My 21st Century Blues
"True Love" (Christine and the Queens featuring 070 Shake)	2023	—	—	—	—	—	—	—	—	—		Paranoïa, Angels, True Love
"—" denotes a recording that did not chart or was not released in that territory.

=== Other charted songs ===
Title	Year	Peak chart positions		Album
Title	Year	US Bub.	CAN	Album
"Holy Mountain" (DJ Khaled featuring Buju Banton, Sizzla, Mavado, and 070 Shake)	2019	12	99	Father of Asahd

=== Guest appearances ===
List of non-single guest appearances, with other performing artists, showing year released and album name
Title	Year	Other performer(s)	Album
"I Need Chu"	2018	FOREVER ANTi PoP	Smells Like Homeless Fart
"What's the Word"	2018	070 Beheard, 070 Phi	Talking Tongues
"Life Is What You Make It"	2018	070 Beheard	Talking Tongues
"Santeria"	2018	Pusha T	Daytona
"Ghost Town"	2018	Kanye West, PartyNextDoor, Kid Cudi	Ye
"Violent Crimes"	2018	Kanye West, Ty Dolla Sign, Nicki Minaj	Ye
"Not for Radio"	2018	Nas, Puff Daddy	Nasir
"Everything"	2018	Nas, The-Dream, Kanye West, Tony Williams, Caroline Shaw	Nasir
"Holy Mountain"	2019	DJ Khaled, Buju Banton, Sizzla, Mavado	Father of Asahd
"80 Mile Zone"	2019	201Jah	Jafet
"Life Won't Be The Same"	2019	201Jah	Jafet
"Scar"	2019	Jessie Reyez	The Lion King: The Gift
"Use Me"	2020	Pvris	Use Me
"Another Minute"	2022	Swedish House Mafia	Paradise Again
"Sky City"	2024	¥$, Desiigner, Cyhi	Vultures 2
"Joke's On You"	2025	Anyma	The End of Genesys

== Filmography ==
=== Television ===
Year	Title	Role	Notes
2022	Entergalactic	Nadia (voice)	Netflix

== Promotion ==
The single "Morrow" is featured in EA Sports's FIFA 21.

The song "Glitter" from the EP Glitter is featured in the Netflix series On My Block, in Season 2, Episode 1.

The single "Lose My Cool" featuring NLE Choppa, is featured on NBA 2K22.

The song "The Pines" from Modus Vivendi is featured in the Netflix series Inventing Anna (2022).

== Concert tours ==
Supporting

- Kid Cudi – To the Moon Tour (2022)
- Coldplay – Music of the Spheres World Tour (2023)
- Daniel Caesar – Son of Spergy Tour (2026)
