= Glitter (EP) =

EP by 070 Shake
- Released: March 23, 2018
- Genre: Hip-hop
- Length: 22:32
- Label: GOOD; Def Jam
- Producer: J Sebastian The Kompetition; Razsy Beats; B Hall

070 Shake chronology
The 070 Project: Chapter 1 (2016)	Glitter (2018)	Modus Vivendi (2020)

Singles from Glitter
- 1. "Stranger" Released: March 22, 2017

Glitter is the debut EP by American hip-hop artist 070 Shake. It was released by GOOD Music and Island Def Jam on March 23, 2018. It was promoted by the lead single, "Stranger".

== Background ==
070 Shake began making music with her 070 collective in late 2015 and was soon picked up by social media promoter YesJulz. GOOD Music president Pusha T found out about 070 Shake's music and signed her to the label in 2016.

Glitter was originally slated for a January 26 release and was to include 12 tracks. At the time of Glitter's release, media outlets noted that her lyrical content concentrated on her self-esteem issues, drug use, and sexuality. Shake described Glitter as "about being in a dark place and finding yourself and figuring it out. It's about being in the lowest of lows type of sh*t." The EP was released on March 23, 2018.

== Track listing ==
All tracks produced by The Kompetition except "Somebody Like Me", produced by Razsy Beats and B Hall.

Glitter
No.	Title	Writer(s)	Length
1.	"I Laugh When I'm with Friends but Sad When I'm Alone"	Danielle Balbuena; Ian Hackney; Ronjae England; Juan Sebastian Brito	3:24
2.	"Somebody Like Me" (featuring 070 Phi)	Balbuena; England; Christian Nystrøm; Ben Lorentzen; Paal Flaata; Mark Jean-Philippe; William Hall	3:24
3.	"Lost in Love"	Balbuena; Hackney; England; Brito	3:22
4.	"Mirrors"	Balbuena; Hackney; England; Brito	4:26
5.	"Stranger"	Balbuena; Hackney; England; Brito	3:42
6.	"Glitter"	Balbuena; Hackney; England; Brito	4:16
Total length:			22:32
