= Champion (Kanye West song) =

2007 song by Kanye West

Song by Kanye West

from the album Graduation
- Released: September 11, 2007
- Studio: Sony Music (NYC); Record Plant (Hollywood)
- Genre: Hip hop; electro; R&B
- Length: 2:47
- Label: Roc-A-Fella; Def Jam
- Songwriters: Kanye West; Walter Becker; Donald Fagen
- Producers: Kanye West; Brian "AllDay" Miller

"Champion" is a song by American rapper Kanye West from his third studio album, Graduation (2007). The song includes additional vocals from Tony "Penafire" Williams and Connie Mitchell. West wrote a letter to Steely Dan requesting to sample their song "Kid Charlemagne", which persuaded the band to approve of this. The band's members Donald Fagen and Walter Becker were credited as co-writers with West on the song due to their work being sampled. West produced it with Brian "AllDay" Miller. The song was played on BET's 106 & Park upon the album's release, while West briefly considered issuing it as a single. A hip hop, electro, and R&B number, it was described by West as a theme song for the people. Lyrically, the song sees Kanye focusing on his fatherly relationship with Ray West.

"Champion" received generally positive reviews from music critics, who frequently commended the sample of "Kid Charlemagne". Some praised Kanye West's rapping skills, while a few critics highlighted the production. Though not released as a single, the song reached number 99 on the US Billboard Hot R&B/Hip-Hop Songs chart. It was certified platinum and silver in the United States and the United Kingdom by the Recording Industry Association of America and British Phonographic Industry, respectively. An accompanying music video was released in August 2008, following the participation of a hand puppet version of West in an event at Adolfo Camarillo High School based on the Olympic Games. West performed a medley of the song and "Everything I Am" during the premiere for season 33 of Saturday Night Live in September 2007, a year before performing it on the US leg of his Glow in the Dark Tour. In February 2008, the former was covered by K-os for Triple J's Like a Version.

== Background ==
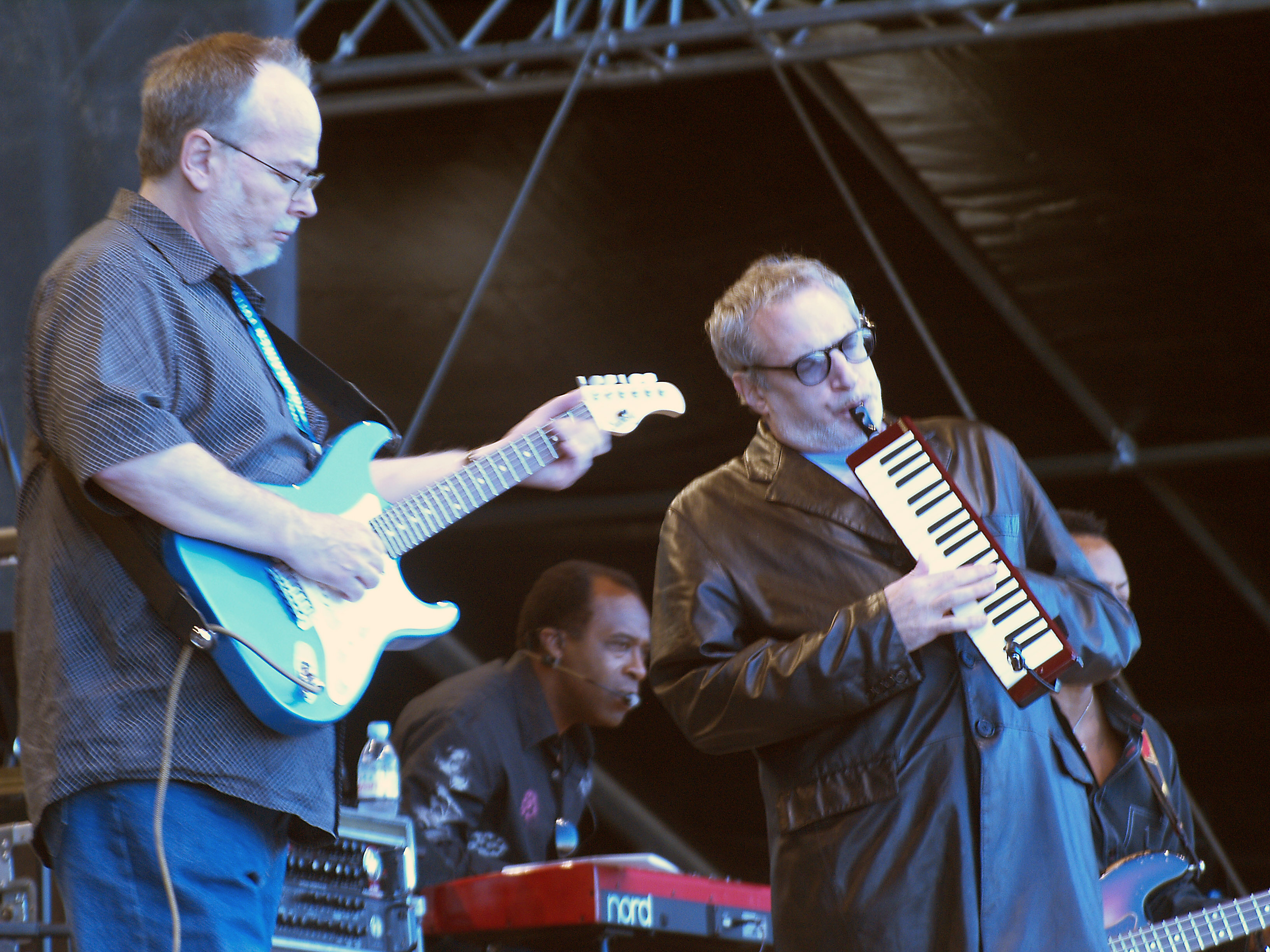
West received permission to sample "Kid Charlemagne" after writing to Steely Dan, pictured in 2007.

In a 2008 Spin cover story, West revealed that the track for "Champion" was first produced by record producer Brian "AllDay" Miller and he was overwhelmed upon first listen. Kanye acknowledged his imperfect relationship with his father Ray West and that "something came out" of him when writing the song for the subject. Kanye West revealed that he sent a letter request to Donald Fagen of jazz rock band Steely Dan for approval of sampling their work, explaining the importance of showing how he felt with the song. Fagen confirmed to Complex a few years later that the band found the letter touching and it led to clearance, after they were initially uninterested in "Champion" besides receiving a portion of income. The singer and band co-founder Walter Becker also felt that the subject matter differed from their preview of the song, with Fagen questioning if it was a prank from West.

In an October 2007 interview with Concrete Loop, West explained that the chords of the synthesizer on "Champion" were added to resemble Graduation single "Stronger". West produced the song with Miller and it was written by the rapper, while the Steely Dan members received writing credits too. In May 2011, rapper Consequence told Sway Calloway on RapFix Live that he wrote the lyrics "We were sorta like Will Smith and his son/In the movie; I ain't talkin' about the rich one." Consequence declared the lyrics were his "brain thought" and mentioned that he did not receive credit for various tracks, despite being credited on West's albums such as The College Dropout (2004) and 808s & Heartbreak (2008). The song includes additional vocals from Tony "Penafire" Williams and Connie Mitchell, marking the third consecutive West album that the former appeared on.

== Composition and lyrics ==
Musically, "Champion" is a hip hop, electro, and R&B number, with undertones of jazz rock and pop music. It runs for a short length at under three minutes, registering an exact length of two minutes and forty-seven seconds (2:47). The track is based around a looped vocal sample of the 1976 recording "Kid Charlemagne" by Steely Dan, which is used for the hook of "Did you realise that you were a champion in their eyes?" It also includes 1980s synthesizers from Omar Edwards, 808-handclaps, and a repeated exclamation of "Hey!" Williams and Mitchell's additional vocals interject: "This is the story of a champion/ Tell me what it takes to be No 1."

West explained that he wanted to create a theme song with "Champion", describing it as being a song for the people. In the lyrics of the song, Kanye shows his appreciation for Ray West despite the struggles in their relationship as he recalls various memories. During the first verse, Kanye expresses pride that while his father was a capable entrepreneur to find a new scheme each summer, he was also able to buy him new clothes each school year. Kanye acknowledges Ray's inspiration as a motivation speaker in the second verse, asserting that his school visits for persuading students to continue studies led them to go from feeling invisible to invincible. Kanye West also mentions how fellow rapper Lauryn Hill became focused on Zion, wishing that she was still dedicated to music.

== Release and promotion ==
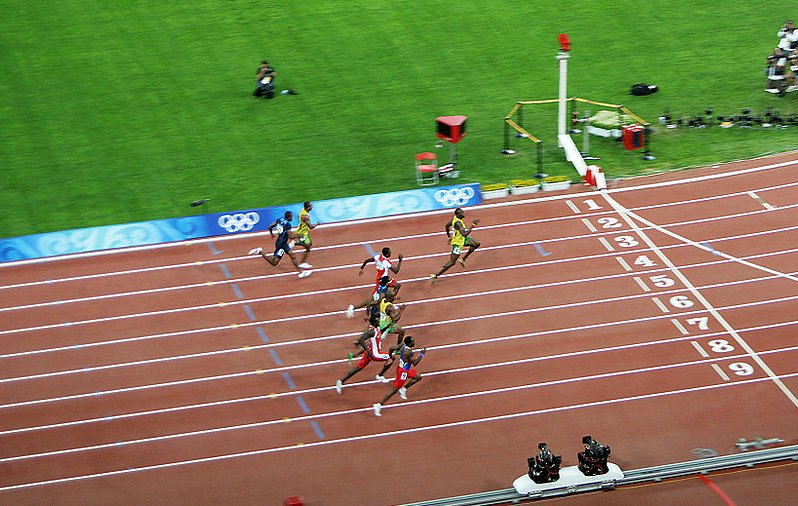
The song's music video replicates the 100 metres sprint Olympic Games event (pictured).

On September 11, 2007, "Champion" was released as the second track on West's third studio album Graduation. That same day, West played a snippet of the song during his appearance on BET's 106 & Park, transitioning into a performance of fellow album track "Can't Tell Me Nothing". In September 2007, West reportedly considered the song for the album's fourth single, although he subsequently chose "Flashing Lights". A music video for "Champion" was directed by Nabil Elderkin, who also worked with West backstage on his Glow in the Dark Tour (2007–08). It was filmed at Adolfo Camarillo High School in Camarillo, California and incorporated Olympic imagery, which had also been done in 2008 by US presidential nominees Barack Obama and John McCain in their campaigns. On August 12, the video was shared to West's blog. The theme is based on the Olympics and features a hand puppet version of West, who participates in the 100 m sprint at a sporting event known as the "Unified Games". After the puppet qualifies to complete in the games from a live TV vote, flashbacks are shown of the training he went through to compete. The race then commences and nearing the finishing line, the puppet is able to pass the other runners and emerge victorious.

== Reception ==
"Champion" was met with generally positive reviews from music critics, who mostly praised the sample of "Kid Charlemagne". Jake Boyer from Highsnobiety thought that the song "packs a hell of a lot in" as the shortest track on Graduation, citing West's "collage of memories of his father" as he comes to terms with his own status, while he also highlighted the looping of the sample. On a similar note, Dotmusic's James Poletti said the looped sample "confirms that we'll never tire of his way". Jesse Mann from Prefix Mag cited it as a particular example of West's sampling skills, while Spin journalist Charles Aaron lauded "the Steely Dan home-run trot". At Pitchfork, Mark Pytlik highlighted these skills and West's articulate production, combined with him obviously "holding up worldliness" in pride. Jesal "Jay Soul" Padania of RapReviews was also impressed with the sample alongside West's performance, showing his evolution "as an incredibly charismatic rapper" and a lyricist to a lesser degree. BBC Music's Jeremy Blakeney lauded West's judgement for the sample as he felt that it shows his historic musical knowledge, despite considering his flow to not be "as special as he probably thinks it is". In PopMatters, Dave Heaton lauded the sample and commented that the song maintained his "big and brassy" sound, although he was unsatisfied with the "Hey!" exclamation resembling "a lounge singer or old-school Vegas comedian" and being equivalent to a cymbal crash. At Cokemachineglow, Chet Betz believed that the sample helps redeem the album, yet it is forced "against a record-skip of a measure" in the song.

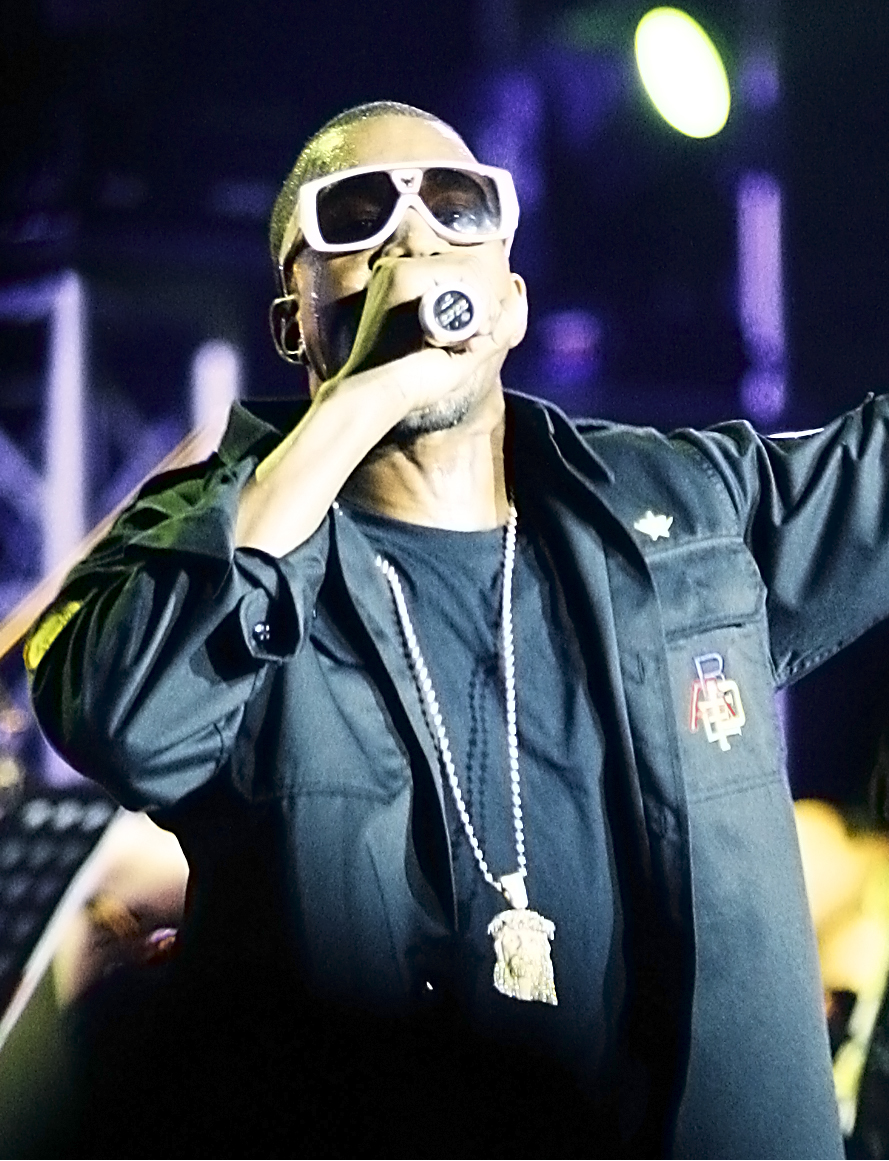
A few reviewers complimented West's rapping skills, with some highlighting his lyricism.

A few critics focused on other aspects of the song. Japie Stoppelenburg from No Ripcord picked "Champion" as the highlight of Graduation, labeling it "a clever, intelligent track with an impeccable concision" over the short length. For Drowned in Sound, Carrie Bradshaw Layfield saw the song as West's version of deceased rapper The Notorious B.I.G.'s 1994 hip hop record "Juicy" due to how he "alludes to a rough childhood", including referencing his new clothes for each school term to make himself out as an underdog. Louis Pattison of NME pointed to its position on the album as where West "plays it punchy and straightforward", through the chorus and his rapping. In Billboard, Hillary Crosley wrote that West expands his production style with the "arena-ready" track.

The song peaked at number 99 on the US Billboard Hot R&B/Hip-Hop Songs chart, making it the album's only track to appear on the chart without being released as a single. On September 23, 2020, "Champion" received a platinum certification from the Recording Industry Association of America for amassing 1,000,000 certified units in the United States. The song was later certified silver by the British Phonographic Industry for shelving 200,000 units in the United Kingdom on December 1, 2023.

== Live performances and other versions ==
West performed a medley of the song with fellow album track "Everything I Am" that led into a freestyle for the premiere to season 33 of Saturday Night Live on September 29, 2007. The rapper delivered a performance of "Champion" for the Glow in the Dark Tour's first US stop at New York's Madison Square Garden on May 13, 2008. The concert was set on a moonlit stage resembling a planet that was covered with smoke, where West wore jeans, a loose sweater, strengthened shoulder pads, and a red waist windbreaker. West began by introducing himself as a space traveler who had landed a planet missing creativity and he later performed the song after his talking computer Jane introduced him: "Remember, this isn't your first crash." The rapper later performed the song during a concert at Chicago's United Center for the tour on May 23, 2008. The show also followed a space theme, featuring several stage pieces on the neon colored set.

On February 14, 2008, Canadian singer k-os delivered an acoustic cover of the song for the weekly segment Like a Version on Australian radio station Triple J. A remix of "Champion" by Nick Catchdubs was included as the third track of Sky High on November 17, a mixtape consisting of remixes of various tracks that West originally produced and it was compiled by DJ Benzi with the rapper's associate Plain Pat. The project was commissioned by West and his team in the lead up to 808s & Heartbreak, with each remix experiencing at least five reiterations before release and they mostly have a club-friendly dance theme. The remix was also shared to BBC Music.

== Credits and personnel ==
Information taken from Graduation liner notes.

Recording

- Recorded at Sony Music Studios (NYC) and Record Plant (Hollywood, CA)
- Mixed at Chung King Studios (NYC)

Personnel

- Kanye West – songwriter, producer
- Walter Becker – songwriter
- Donald Fagen – songwriter
- Brian "AllDay" Miller – producer
- Andrew Dawson – recorder, mix engineer
- Anthony Kilhoffer – recorder
- Bram Tobey – assistant mix engineer
- Jason Agel – assistant mix engineer
- Nate Hertweck – assistant mix engineer
- Anthony Palazzole – assistant mix engineer
- Andy Marcinkowski – assistant mix engineer
- Omar Edwards – synths
- Tony "Penafire" Williams – additional vocals
- Connie Mitchell – additional vocals

== Charts ==
Chart performance for "Champion"
Chart (2007)	Peak position
US Hot R&B/Hip-Hop Songs (Billboard)	99

== Certifications ==
Certifications for "Champion"
Region	Certification	Certified units/sales
New Zealand (RMNZ)	Gold	15,000^{‡}
United Kingdom (BPI)	Silver	200,000^{‡}
United States (RIAA)	Platinum	1,000,000^{‡}
^{‡} Sales+streaming figures based on certification alone.
