= In Whose Name? =

2025 documentary by Nico Ballesteros

- Directed by: Nico Ballesteros
- Produced by: Nico Ballesteros; Simran A. Singh; Shy Ranje (co- producer)
- Starring: Kanye West
- Cinematography: Nico Ballesteros
- Edited by: Nico Ballesteros; Jack M. Russell; Justin Staple
- Music by: Leon Lacey
- Distributed by: AMSI Entertainment
- Release date: September 19, 2025
- Running time: 104 minutes
- Country: United States
- Language: English
- Box office: $1.02 million

In Whose Name? is a 2025 American documentary film produced, shot, edited and directed by Nico Ballesteros about the life of the American rapper Kanye West. It was released in theaters on September 19, 2025, through AMSI Entertainment.

== Synopsis ==
In Whose Name? covers six years of the American rapper Kanye West's life, including his struggles with bipolar disorder, performances with the Sunday Service Choir, unsuccessful 2020 presidential campaign, the collapse of his marriage with Kim Kardashian, and his antisemitic public outbursts. Elon Musk, Drake, Marilyn Manson, Pharrell Williams, Lil Dicky, Playboi Carti, Swizz Beatz, and Charlie Kirk make appearances, as do Chris Rock, Consequence, Michael Che, Steve Higgins, David Letterman, Rihanna, Amber Rose, Kris Jenner, Lady Gaga, LeBron James, Sean Combs, Anna Wintour, Joel Osteen, DMX, James Turrell, Kenny G, Candace Owens, and Donald Trump.

== Production ==
Nico Ballesteros began recording In Whose Name? in 2019, when he was eighteen years old. According to the synopsis, he shot the film in 15-hour shoot days. Ballesteros recorded over 3,000 hours of footage, which was cut down to an hour and 46 minutes for the final film.

During the editing phase of post-production, the team consisting of Ballesteros, Jack Mason Russell, and Shy Ranje—who contributed as a story editor—relocated to Costa Rica to continue work on the film. They brought the project's hard drives, servers, and monitors and spent a year editing in a remote jungle house. This move was partly for security, as the footage consisted of roughly 3,000 hours of unedited material that could have been of interest to media outlets.

The film is produced by Ballesteros and Simran A. Singh, with Shy Ranje and Jack Mason Russell serving as co-producers, Justin Staple as executive producer, and David Bullock serving as associate producer.

Ballesteros began filming his own life when he was eight years old, saying in a statement to The Hollywood Reporter that "[f]or a shy kid, the camera became both a shield and a window, a way to channel my introspection while still engaging with the world." He theorized that this might be the reason why he and West "understood each other without saying much. I was able to fade into the background, stay present, the camera always rolling, catching moments outside the public performance."

== Marketing ==
The documentary was publicly revealed on November 1, 2024, through an exclusive story with Variety. The article revealed the film's synopsis and producers, as well as claiming it was currently in post-production. The film was set to be released to the American Film Market through Goodfellas and Utopia, with a promo reel being shown on November 7. During that time, Ballesteros posted a text exchange he had with West, who called the documentary "very deep. It was like being dead and looking back on my life."

On August 13, 2025, a trailer was released for In Whose Name?, featuring a clip of West and Kardashian. Following the trailer, Singh stated the film will not include any "commentary or conclusion" on West, wanting the audience to come to their own conclusions. A second trailer was released on August 27.

== Release ==
In Whose Name? was released to theaters on September 19, 2025, through AMSI Entertainment. It was distributed to 1,000 theaters in the United States in partnership with AMC Theatres, Regal Cinemas, and Cinemark Theatres. After its opening weekend, the film's producers planned to extend its theatrical run and eventually add it to streaming services. Ballesteros has stated the streaming version of In Whose Name? will be a director's cut, claiming he had to "Trojan Horse culture" for its theatrical release.

=== Box office ===
In Whose Name? grossed $776,000 in its opening weekend. Publications generally found its box office performance to be surprising, as the film did not receive heavy promotion in the lead up to its release; Rolling Stone projected that it would go on to outperform several other documentaries released earlier in the year by comparing their opening numbers.
