= Finding Dakota Grey =

Mixtape by The World Famous Tony Williams
- Released: March 2, 2010
- Genre: R&B
- Label: GOOD Music
- Producers: Chris Cutta; Erwin Murphey; Andreo "Fanatic" Heard; Haskel Jackson; Derrick Allen; Funk Labb; Leon Lacey; The World Famous Tony Williams; Ed Roc; Riztocrat; Key Tech; Femi Ojetunde; DJ Deshay; James Dumaine; Kanye West

The World Famous Tony Williams chronology
| Finding Dakota Grey (2010) | Some of My Best Rappers Are Friends (2012) |

Finding Dakota Grey is the first mixtape by American R&B and soul recording artist The World Famous Tony Williams released on March 2, 2010. The tape was released under the GOOD Music stamp. After solidifying himself in the industry for being the voice behind many of his cousin, Kanye West, and friend Jay Z's hits, Tony stepped front and center with his first solo project. Finding Dakota Grey features guest appearances from Dakota Grey, Kanye West, GLC, Mama Sol, S.O.S. (Nick and Nate), Prophetic, Al B. Back, Chop Chop, Al D., Matt Moerdock, Cello the Black Pearl, Tada, Nu Skyy and Really Doe.

== Theme ==
Tony Williams constructed this tape as his debut mainstream project and used this as an opportunity to introduce the world to an artist who he discovered, Dakota Grey. This project was a collection of original music, covers, and remixes. Tony tapped into a wide range of styles, from his signature soulful ballads and club bangers to a Brazilian hit where he sang on a hook in Portuguese. He experienced some musical chart success in France with the remix of Dreamin' Of Your Love.

== Track listing ==
From livemixtapes/Spinrilla.

| # | Song | Time | Featured guest(s) | Producer(s) |
|---|---|---|---|---|
| 1 | Intro | 1:11 | | Chris Cutta & Erwin Murphy |
| 2 | Hey Boy Hey Girl | 4:39 | Dakota Grey | Andreo "Fanatic" Heard |
| 3 | Backstage Pass | 4:13 | S.O.S (Ben Kenobe and Nate G) & Prophetic | Chris Cutta |
| 4 | Nuskyy TV Interview | 0:34 | | |
| 5 | DJ Aktive Remix | 3:07 | | |
| 6 | Chicken Wings Skit | 0:17 | | |
| 7 | Amazing (Remix) | 3:59 | Kanye West | Haskel Jackson & Derrick Allen |
| 8 | Late Early | 4:34 | Al B. Back & Chop Chop | Chris Cutta |
| 9 | Way I Like It | 4:06 | Dakota Grey | Funk Labb |
| 10 | Flashlight | 3:31 | Al D. | Haskel Jackson |
| 11 | Dreamin' Of Your Love (Parisian Remix) | 5:26 | Matt Moerdock | |
| 12 | You Know French Skit | 0:29 | | |
| 13 | Same Movie Scene | 3:13 | Dakota Grey | Leon Lacey |
| 14 | I'm Not Mad | 3:31 | | Chris Cutta, Erwin Murphey & The World Famous Tony Williams |
| 15 | La La, La La | 4:02 | | Ed Roc & Haskel Jackson |
| 16 | Been A Lot Of Places Skit | 0:12 | | |
| 17 | Linda Garota | 3:36 | | Riztocrat |
| 18 | No | 0:04 | | |
| 19 | King Or The Fool | 3:55 | | Chris Cutta & Key Tech |
| 20 | No Sunshine | 4:12 | Dakota Grey & Mama Sol | Ed Roc & Haskel Jackson |
| 21 | Nightmares (Remix) | 4:19 | Cello the Black Pearl & Tada | Haskel Jackson & Femi Ojetunde |
| 22 | Still Got Love | 4:39 | Chop Chop | DJ Deshay |
| 23 | We Can Make A Hit Skit | 0:25 | | |
| 24 | I Don't Give A Shit | 4:19 | Nu Skyy, GLC & Really Doe | James Dumaine |
| 25 | Pro Tools Skit | 0:17 | | |
| 26 | Double Back On His Love | 3:23 | Dakota Grey | Andreo "Fanatic" Heard |
| 27 | A Star Is Born | 3:27 | Kanye West, Mama Sol, Al D. & Prophetic | Kanye West |
