= Shy Ranje =

American film producer

- Born: April 12, 1997; Los Angeles, California

Shy Ranje (born April 12, 1997) is an American actor and producer from Los Angeles, California. He trained in Paris at the Jacques Lecoq International Theatre School during the 2022–2023 academic year, before founding a theatre ensemble focused on collaborative and experimental performance.

In 2025, Ranje co-produced and wrote the film In Whose Name?, a documentary based on the life of rapper Kanye West. The project was described by Vulture as an "unflinching" look at the artist's life and controversies. Ranje was also credited in a GQ feature on the film's production, which detailed his role as a story editor. Alongside Ballesteros and Russell, he relocated to the Costa Rica jungle for a year to work on the editing process of the documentary. In November 2025, In Whose Name? was included on Deadline Hollywood's list of documentary features eligible for the Academy Awards in 2026. One month later, the Los Angeles Times placed the film at #8 on its list of the best films of 2025.

== Filmography ==
- In Whose Name? (2025) – Co-producer & Story Editor
