= The Wrldfms Tony Williams =

American singer

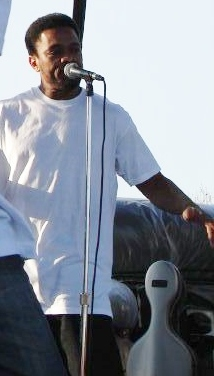
- Williams in 2006

Background information
- Also known as: Penafire; the World Famous Tony Williams
- Born: Antony Von Williams; Oklahoma City, Oklahoma, U.S.
- Origin: Fort Worth, Texas, U.S.
- Genres: R&B; hip hop; soul; gospel
- Occupations: Singer; songwriter; record producer
- Years active: 2003–present
- Labels: YZY SND; GOOD; The High Society; Uncle Pete's Parade
- Member of: Sunday Service Choir
- Management: David Bullock (2020–present)
- Website: www.wrldfms.com

Antony Von Williams, known professionally as the Wrldfms Tony Williams, is an American singer and songwriter. Born in Oklahoma City, Oklahoma, Williams is the first cousin of American rapper Kanye West and has contributed vocals or songwriting to most of his albums, beginning with The College Dropout (2004).

== Early life ==
Williams grew up an only child in Oklahoma City, Oklahoma. Both his mother and father had musical backgrounds, and Williams was given his first instrument, a saxophone, at the age of eight. He grew up singing in youth choirs at church and played in the marching band through his tenth grade year of high school. Williams love for music continued throughout his early adulthood as he went on to form several bands that ranged in style from funk, rock, alternative, and Christian alternative, and took on the role as lead vocalist. He is the cousin of American rapper Kanye West.

== Musical career ==
=== Songwriter ===
Williams' name appears on Kanye West's albums as Tony "Penafire" Williams which is the pseudonym he uses when crediting himself as a writer. He was a co-writer of two songs on The College Dropout, the Grammy Award winning 2004 album, following which Williams was invited to write for all of West's subsequent albums.

On the 2005 MTV documentary, Composing History The Making of Late Registration, he was featured producing vocals for Brandy on the song "Bring Me Down", which he co-wrote. During that documentary, West described Williams as being "a great writer with a cutting edge voice."

=== Singer ===
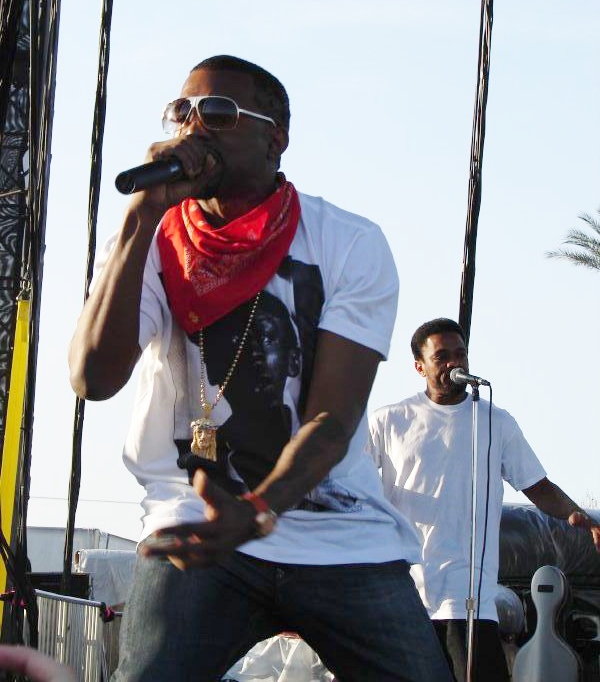
Kanye West performing at Coachella festival while backed by Williams, 2006

Tony Williams first became noticed as a singer when he debuted on Kanye West's Grammy winning album The College Dropout, singing a version of the gospel hymn "I'll Fly Away". By the second album, Late Registration, Kanye was giving Williams shout outs on the song, "We Major" which gave rise to the line Kanye fans use in reference to Williams, "I gotta say what's up to Tony Williams". On that same album Tony wrote the hook for the song, "Roses", which featured him singing with Patti LaBelle. This album not only promoted Tony Williams name, but for the first time fans were able to match his voice and name with a face. He was featured on the song and the video for "Drive Slow". Later, he was seen singing with Kanye when West was featured on the MTV television series, Life and Rhymes of Kanye West.

By the time Kanye went on the Touch the Sky Tour, Williams was known as the background singer that always accompanied West, including on several world tours.

Williams is one of a few performers who have performed at two different Inaugural Balls; the Neighborhood Ball where he performed with Jay-Z on the song "History", and the Youth Ball where he performed with Kanye West. His voice is recognized on some popular Hip Hop songs, having performed with, for example, Jay-Z, Kanye West, Nas, the Game, and Rick Ross.

In March 2010, Williams released his first mainstream project in the form of a mixtape, The World Famous Tony Williams: Finding Dakota Grey which was released with the GOOD Music stamp. This project was a collection of original music, covers, and remixes, including the "Dreaming of your love remix" with the French rapper Matt Moerdock.

In October 2010, Williams released his first single "Everything About You" from his debut studio album, King or the Fool, which was released on February 14, 2012.

=== Featured artist ===
The first time Williams experienced artistic autonomy was in 2007 when he made an appearance on Kanye's Can't Tell Me Nothing mixtape, singing a song he had written and that was produced by West, "Dreaming of Your Love". This legitimized him as a featured artist. It was at that time that Williams added "The World Famous" to his name to differentiate himself from the famous drummer with the same name, and because in the vocal sample of the song "Dreaming of Your Love" the intro says, "You're listening to the world famous". Williams has had songs played on Brazilian airwaves, where he sang some of the vocals in Portuguese, and some musical chart success in France.

On January 13, 2025, West posted an image of him and Williams during the 2016 Yeezy Season 3 event on his Instagram profile, confirming a possible collaboration between the two on West's twelfth studio allbum, Bully (2026); he later appeared on the deluxe edition of the album on the track "Mission Control".

== Discography ==
=== Studio albums ===
List of albums, with selected information
Title	Album details
King or the Fool: An Opera, Vol. 1	Released: February 14, 2012; Label: The High Society; Formats: CD, digital download
A Fish Without a Bicycle	Released: June 16, 2023; Label: Curb Records; Formats: CD, digital download

=== EPs ===
List of extended plays, with year released
Title	Album details
The 7th Day	Released: July 22, 2017; Label: Uncle Pete's Parade; Format: Digital download

=== Mixtapes ===
List of mixtapes, with year released
Title	Album details
Finding Dakota Grey	Released: March 2, 2010; Label: GOOD Music; Format: Digital download
Some of My Best Rappers Are Friends	Released: January 13, 2012; Label: The High Society; Format: Digital download

=== Singles ===
==== As lead artist ====
List of promotional singles, showing year released and album name
Title	Year	Album
"Everything About You"	2010	non-album single
"Sleepover"	2012	King or the Fool: An Opera, Vol. 1
"Another You" (featuring Kanye West)	2012	King or the Fool: An Opera, Vol. 1
"Stuck in the Middle" (featuring Cyhi The Prynce)	2016	non-album single
"Deck the Halls" (with Wyn Starks and Jay-Way)	2020	non-album single
"Amen (Reborn)" (with For King & Country and Lecrae)	2021	non-album single
"Everybody Knows" (with Wale)	2021	A Fish Without a Bicycle
"Anymore" (with Chandler Moore)	2021	A Fish Without a Bicycle

=== Other charted songs ===
List of songs, with selected chart positions, showing year released and album name
Title	Year	Peak chart positions			Album
Title	Year	US	AUS	CAN	Album
"Donda" (Kanye West featuring Stalone and the World Famous Tony Williams)	2021	58	38	48	Donda
"—" denotes a recording that did not chart or was not released in that territory.

=== Album credits ===
Year	Album	Song	Credits
1999	Rashani – Positive and Progress		
2004		"All Ah Dem"	Vocals
2004		"How long"	Vocals
2004		"Conspiracy"	Vocals
2004		"Mickey Mouse Lovin"	Vocals
2004		"I'll Fly Away"	Vocals
2004		"Spaceship"	Vocals/Writer
2004		"School Spirit"	Vocals
2004		"Lil Jimmy Skit"	Vocals
2004		"Last Call"	Vocals/Writer
2005	Kanye West – Late Registration	"Drive Slow"	Vocals
2005	Kanye West – Late Registration	"Crack Music"	Vocals
2005	Kanye West – Late Registration	"Roses"	Vocals/Writer
2005	Kanye West – Late Registration	"Bring Me Down"	Writer/Vocal Producer
2005	Kanye West – Late Registration	"We Major"	Vocals/Writer
2005	Kanye West – Late Registration	"Late"	Vocals
2007	Kanye West – Graduation	"Good Morning"	Vocals
2007	Kanye West – Graduation	"Champion"	Vocals/Writer
2007	Kanye West – Graduation	"Flashing Lights"	Vocals
2007	Kanye West – Graduation	"Everything I Am"	Vocals
2007	Kanye West – Graduation	"Homecoming"	Writer
2007	Consequence – Don't Quit Your Day Job!	"Don't Forget Em"	Vocals
2007	Consequence – Don't Quit Your Day Job!	"Disperse"	Vocals
2007	Consequence – Don't Quit Your Day Job!	"Who Knew My Luck Would Change?"	Vocals
2008	Kanye West – 808s & Heartbreak	"Say You Will"	Vocals
2008	Kanye West – 808s & Heartbreak	"Amazing"	Vocals
2008	Kanye West – 808s & Heartbreak	"RoboCop"	Vocals/Writer
2008	Kanye West – 808s & Heartbreak	"Street Lights"	Vocals/Writer
2009	More than a Game soundtrack	"History"	Vocals/Writer
2009	Jay-Z – The Blueprint 3	"A Star Is Born"	
2010	Kid Sister – Ultraviolet (U.K. release)		
		"Daydreaming"	Vocals
2010	Rick Ross – Teflon Don		
		"Live Fast, Die Young"	Vocals
2010	Kanye West – My Beautiful Dark Twisted Fantasy		
		"Dark Fantasy"	Vocals
		"Gorgeous"	Vocals
		"All of the Lights"	Vocals
		"Runaway"	Vocals
		"Hell of a Life"	Vocals
		"Lost in the World"	Vocals
2011	Outlawz – Perfect Timing		
		"Remember Me"	Vocals
2011	Promise – Awakening		
		"Everyone Knows"	Vocals
2013	Kanye West – Yeezus		
		"Blood on the Leaves"	Vocals/Writer
2016	Kanye West – The Life of Pablo		
		"Waves"	Vocals/Writer
2018	Pusha T – Daytona		
		"Hard Piano"	Vocals/Writer
		"Santeria"	Writer
2018	Nas – NASIR		
		"Bonjour"	Vocals/Writer
2018	Teyana Taylor – K.T.S.E.		
		"3Way"	Writer
2021	Kanye West – Donda		
		"Donda"	Vocals
2026	Kanye West – Bully		
		"I Can't Wait"	Vocal Producer
		"Mission Control"	Vocals/Writer
