= You Can't Kill Me =

Studio album by 070 Shake
- Released: June 3, 2022
- Genres: Hip-hop; R&B; electropop
- Length: 48:52
- Labels: GOOD; Def Jam
- Producers: 070 Shake; Juan Brito; Mike Dean; Vincent Giovinazzo; Dave Hamelin; Johan Lenox; Dave Sitek

070 Shake chronology
Modus Vivendi (2020)	You Can't Kill Me (2022)	Petrichor (2024)

Singles from You Can't Kill Me
- 1. "Skin and Bones" Released: April 22, 2022; 2. "Web" Released: May 4, 2022; 3. "Body" Released: May 20, 2022

You Can't Kill Me is the second studio album by American singer-musician 070 Shake. It was released on June 3, 2022, through GOOD Music and Def Jam Recordings.

== Background and release ==
In August 2021, 070 Shake announced the title of her next album, You Can't Kill Me Because I Don't Exist. On April 22, 2022, she released "Skin and Bones" as the first single of the album, along with a music video. She also announced the new title of the album, shortened to You Can't Kill Me. On May 4, 2022, she released the album's second single, "Web". She also announced the album's tracklist, cover art, and release date on the same date. On May 20, 2022, she released the album's third single, "Body", featuring Christine and the Queens.

== Critical reception ==
Professional ratings
Aggregate scores
Source	Rating
AnyDecentMusic?	7.4/10
Metacritic	74/100
Review scores
Source	Rating
Clash	8/10
The Observer	3/5 stars
HipHopDX	3.6/5
Pitchfork	7.0/10
Rolling Stone	3.5/5 stars
The Line of Best Fit	8/10
The Music	5/5 stars

According to the review aggregator Metacritic, You Can't Kill Me received "generally favorable reviews" based on a weighted average score of 74 out of 100 from 6 critic scores. Aggregator AnyDecentMusic? gave the album a 7.4 out of 10 based on their assessment of the critical consensus.

The album received praise for its production. Writing for The Line of Best Fit, Wepea Buntugu praised the album's "large, swelling beats and instrumentation" and "strong, rousing choruses." Pitchfork's Eric Torres described the album as "full of keening synths, electric guitars, and heavy drum beats." Writing for HipHopDX, Matthew Ritchie described the album as having a "lush array of synth-pop and soul elements" but wrote that Shake, at times, "veiled behind the strength of the album’s production." The album's writing received a more mixed reception. The Observer's Ammar Kalia criticized the album as having "too many moments where Balbuena adopts a middling mumble, stumbling over her melodies." Pitchfork's Torres described her songwriting as "woozy" and "plaintive" with an "intoxicating touch." The Line of Best Fit's Buntugu described Shake's lyricism as "fascinating", writing: "she condenses the main messages of each song into a few words, and the whole punch of a track may take up just about a verse or even less." 070 Shake's vocal performance on the album received praise. The Observer's Kalia praised her voice as "soaring." Pitchfork's Torres described her voice as "despairing" and "rafters-reaching." Writing for The Music, Cyclone Wehner concludes writing, "You Can't Kill Me thematises transience and the cosmic vagaries of consciousness, volition and inevitability in the digital age, but it really is destined to be a sleeper classic."

=== Accolades ===
Publication	Accolade	Rank	Ref.
Complex	The Best Albums of 2022	17	
Gorilla vs. Bear	Gorilla vs. Bear's Albums of 2022	23	
The Line of Best Fit	The Best Albums of 2022 Ranked	34	
Time	The 10 Best Albums of 2022	9	

== Track listing ==
You Can't Kill Me track listing
No.	Title	Writer(s)	Producer(s)	Length
1.	"Web"	Danielle Balbuena; Mike Dean; Stephen Feigenbaum	070 Shake; Dave Hamelin; Johan Lenox; Dean^{[c]}	2:06
2.	"Invited"	Balbuena; Feigenbaum; Dave Hamelin; Juan Brito	070 Shake; Johan Lenox; Hamelin^{[a]}; Juan Brito^{[a]}	2:42
3.	"History"	Balbuena; Hamelin; Ebony Oshunrinde	070 Shake; Hamelin; WondaGurl^{[a]}	4:51
4.	"Medicine"	Balbuena; Dean; Hamelin	070 Shake; Hamelin; Dean^{[c]}	3:15
5.	"Skin and Bones"	Balbuena; Dean; Hamelin; Oshunrinde	Hamelin; Dean^{[c]}; WondaGurl^{[c]}	3:34
6.	"Blue Velvet"	Balbuena; Hamelin	070 Shake; Hamelin	4:37
7.	"Cocoon"	Balbuena; Hamelin; Sean Solymar	070 Shake; Hamelin; Sean Solymar^{[c]}	3:21
8.	"Body" (with Christine and the Queens)	Balbuena; Dean; Dave Sitek; Héloïse Letissier	070 Shake; Dean; Hamelin; Dave Sitek	3:31
9.	"Wine & Spirits"	Balbuena; Brito; Feigenbaum; Hamelin; Vincent Giovinazzo	070 Shake; Brito; Hamelin; Johan Lenox; Vincent Giovinazzo	3:16
10.	"Come Back Home"	Balbuena; Brito; Dean; Hamelin; Ilya Salmanzadeh	070 Shake; Hamelin; Dean^{[c]}; Ilya^{[a]}	5:02
11.	"Vibrations"	Balbuena; Brito; Feigenbaum; Giovinazzo; Hamelin; Atia Boggs; Jalil Peraza	070 Shake; Brito; Giovinazzo; Hamelin; Johan Lenox	3:41
12.	"Purple Walls"	Balbuena; Hamelin	070 Shake; Hamelin	2:50
13.	"Stay"	Balbuena; Brito; Feigenbaum; Hamelin; Peraza	070 Shake; Hamelin; Brito^{[a]}; Johan Lenox^{[a]}	2:43
14.	"Se Fue la Luz"	Balbuena; Brito; Hamelin; Malick Ba	070 Shake; Brito; Hamelin	3:26
Total length:				48:55

Notes

- ^{^[c]} signifies a co-producer.
- ^{^[a]} signifies an additional producer.

== Personnel ==
Musicians

- 070 Shake – vocals
- Johan Lenox – background vocals (track 1), synthesizer (2, 9, 11, 13)
- Mike Dean – synthesizer (tracks 1, 4, 8, 10), guitar (1, 4)
- Dave Hamelin – guitar (tracks 2, 9, 10, 14), piano (4, 9, 10, 14), drums (4), synthesizer (7, 9, 13, 14), programming (12)
- Vincent Giovinazzo – guitar (tracks 2, 9), keyboards (11)
- Marza Wilks – cello (tracks 2, 9, 12)
- WondaGurl – keyboards (track 3), programming (5)
- Yasmeen Al-Mazeedi – violin (tracks 3, 12, 14)
- Christine and the Queens – additional vocals (track 8)
- Dave Sitek – synthesizer (track 8)
- Todor Kobakov – piano (track 10)
- Ink – additional vocals (track 11)
- Ryan Svedson – trumpet (track 13)
- Dontae Winslow – trumpet (track 14)

Technical

- Mike Dean – mastering (all tracks), mixing (tracks 1, 2, 4–14)
- Mark "Spike" Stent – mixing (track 3)
- Jenna Felsenthal – engineering
- Dave Hamelin – engineering (tracks 2–6, 9, 13)
- Ryan Svedson – engineering (tracks 6, 13), mix engineering (7)
- Tommy Rush – mixing assistance (tracks 1, 2, 4–14)
- Sean Solymar – engineering (8), mixing assistance (tracks 1, 2, 4, 6–14)
- Matt Wolach – mixing assistance (track 3)
- Johan Lenox – string arrangement (tracks 3, 6, 12, 14), vocal arrangement (3)
- Todor Kobakov – string arrangement (track 10)

== Charts ==
Chart performance for You Can't Kill Me
Chart	Peak position
US Heatseekers Albums (Billboard)	6
