= GOOD Music =

American record label

Getting Out Our Dreams, Inc.
- Parent company: Mascotte Holdings
- Founded: March 16, 2004; 22 years ago
- Founder: Kanye West
- Status: Active
- Distributors: Def Jam (only 070 Shake since 2023); Interscope (only Sheck Wes); Columbia (only John Legend); Geffen (only Common)
- Genre: Various, with a focus on hip-hop and R&B
- Country of origin: United States
- Location: New York City; Chicago, Illinois

Getting Out Our Dreams, Inc. (best known as GOOD Music or G.O.O.D. Music) is an American independent record label founded by rapper Kanye West in 2004. The label entered an exclusive long-term worldwide distribution contract with the Island Def Jam Music Group in 2011. In 2012, the label released its only compilation album, Cruel Summer. In 2015, Pusha T was appointed president of the label by West, while record executive Steven Victor was appointed chief operating officer (COO). In late 2022, Pusha T stepped down from the position as he was no longer on speaking terms with West.

The label has released two number-one US Billboard Hot 100 singles—"All of Me" by John Legend, and "Panda" by Desiigner—as well as nine number-one US Billboard 200 albums—Finding Forever (2007) by Common; Dark Sky Paradise (2015), I Decided (2017), and Detroit 2 (2020) by Big Sean; The Life of Pablo (2016), Ye (2018), Jesus Is King (2019), and Donda (2021) by Kanye West; and It's Almost Dry (2022) by Pusha T.

== History ==
=== Prior efforts ===
In 2001, West established a company to forward revenue cuts for his expanding production work. Known at the time as Konman Productions (or Konman Entertainment), it was joined by local talent including Devo Harris, BoogzDaBeast, Brian "AllDay" Miller, Arrowstar, GLC, Mikkey Halsted, and Really Doe, among others. Many members of the company have since contributed to West's following projects or sign to what would become known as GOOD Music. Select members of the company, including West, contributed to a bootleg compilation project titled World Record Holders under the recording outfit "Go Getters" in 1999.

=== 2004–2007 ===
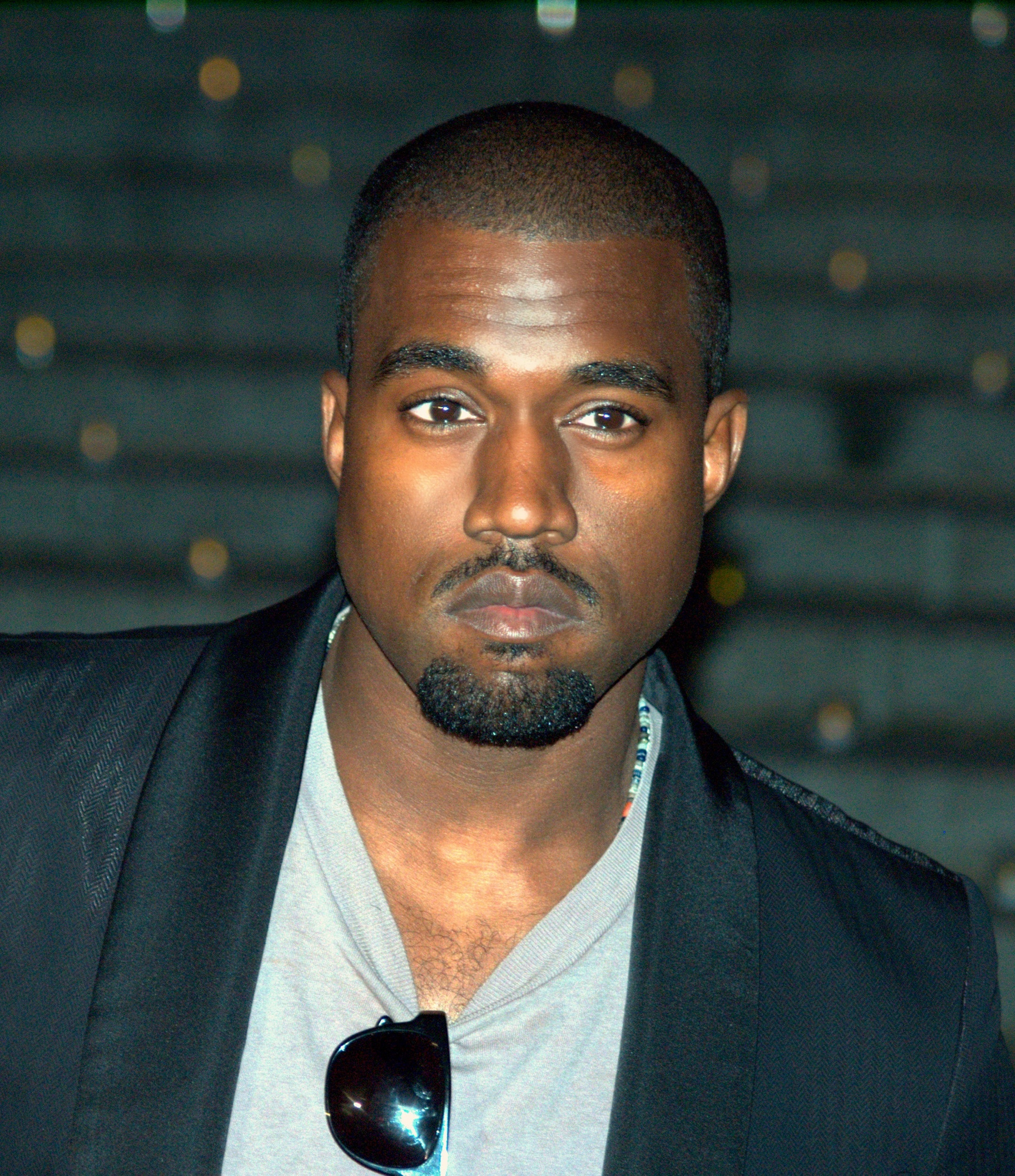
Kanye West, founder of GOOD Music

GOOD Music was founded in 2004 by Kanye West in a joint venture with Sony BMG, shortly after the release of his debut album The College Dropout. Ohio singer John Legend and fellow Chicago rapper Common were the label's initial artists, along with West himself. Legend's Get Lifted (2004) was the label's first album release and quickly led both the artist and label to commercial success. The album won three awards from eight nominations at the 48th Annual Grammy Awards, and was supported by the Best Male R&B Performance recipient "Ordinary People", which also peaked at number 24 on the Billboard Hot 100. In October 2006, Legend released his second album, Once Again, which won Legend his second consecutive Grammy for Best Male R&B Vocal Performance with its single "Heaven".

Common's Be (2005), the label's second release, was the recipient of four Grammy Award nominations. During this time, Chicago-based recording artists GLC, Really Doe, Consequence, and Malik Yusef, as well as West's familial relative Tony Williams were added to its roster. West's second studio album, Late Registration, included guest appearances by each of the label's artists by the time of its August 2005 release. In 2005, West met then-unknown rapper Sean "Big Sean" Anderson before a radio interview. After performing a freestyle, he left West with a demo tape, and in May 2007, Big Sean was signed to the label. In an August 2007 interview with Billboard, West expressed regrets over starting the label:

Running a record label was the biggest mistake I ever made. I never asked to be a label owner. Sony offered it to me, and I took it. But I can't be there when people are calling me to the studio to hear some music or approve clothes for a video. No disrespect to anybody, my focus is [on] Graduation, I've got a hard enough time calling radio programmers and getting them to play "Can't Tell Me Nothing", a song that's connecting with people but that's only at 1,400 spins.

— Kanye West, Billboard

=== 2008–2011 ===
In 2008, British singer-songwriter Mr Hudson was signed, following the release of his debut A Tale of Two Cities (2007). There followed Kid Cudi, and manager Plain Pat. Kid Cudi's debut album, Man on the Moon: The End of Day was released under GOOD Music on September 15, 2009. The album earned three Grammy nominations and was certified Gold by the RIAA. A month later, Mr Hudson's major label debut, Straight No Chaser, was released.

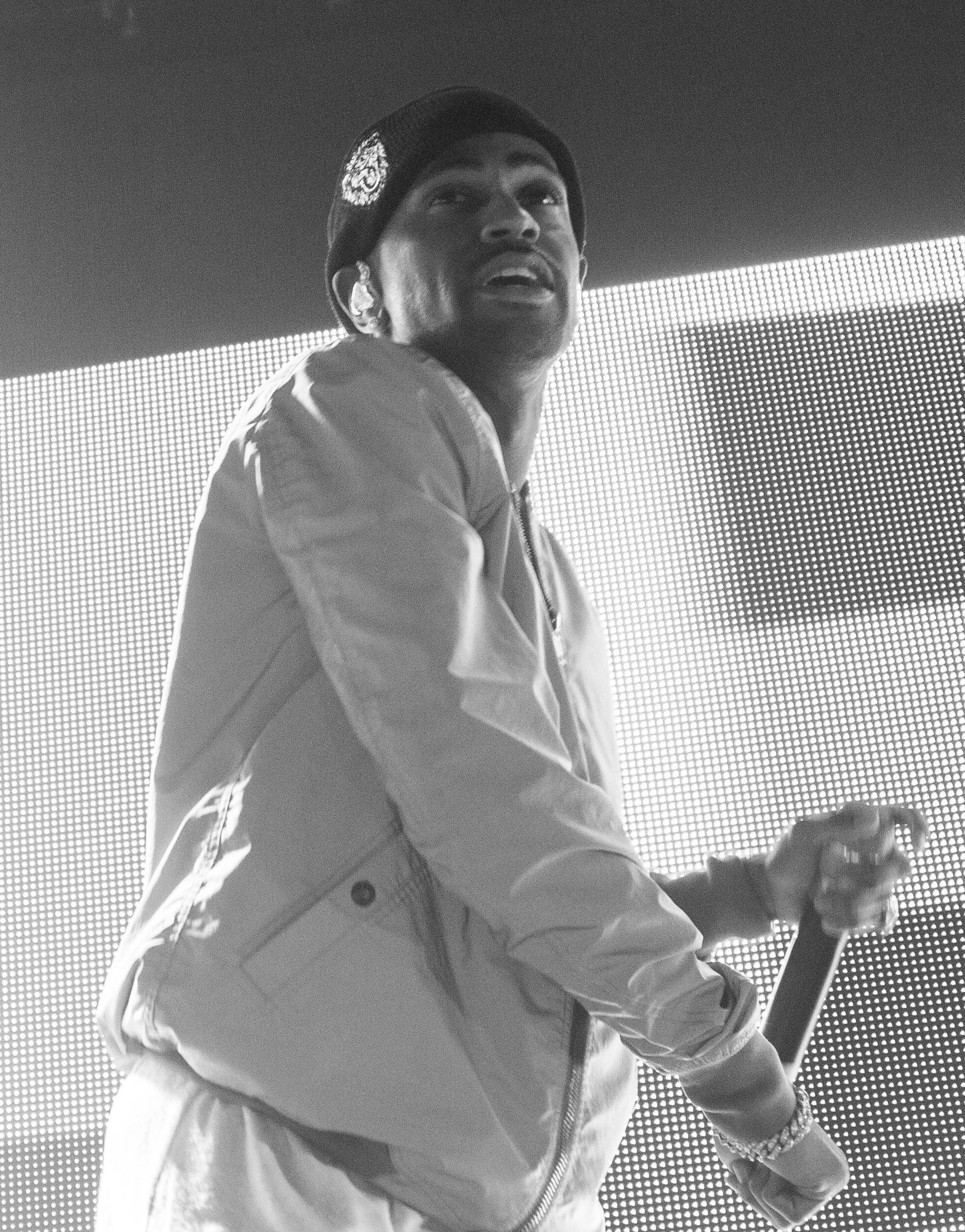
Big Sean signed to the label in 2007.

In late 2010, West released several tracks featuring himself, and other members of the GOOD Music roster, in a free weekly giveaway known as, G.O.O.D. Fridays. In September 2010, Brooklyn rapper Mos Def was signed. Shortly afterwards Consequence released a diss track and left the label. The following month Pusha T announced his signing to the label. Late in 2010, Kid Cudi released his second studio album Man on the Moon II: The Legend of Mr. Rager, followed by West's fifth album My Beautiful Dark Twisted Fantasy. West, Pusha T, Big Sean, Common and Cyhi the Prynce took part in a cypher at the 2010 BET Hip Hop Awards.

In April 2011, West signed American rapper and producer Q-Tip of A Tribe Called Quest. Kanye West also signed producer Hit-Boy, to Very Good Beats. In 2011, West signed Nigerian artists D'banj and Don Jazzy. In June 2011, GOOD Music signed their first distribution agreement, with Def Jam Recordings. Big Sean's debut Finally Famous was the first album released by GOOD Music with distribution by Def Jam.

=== 2012–2017 ===
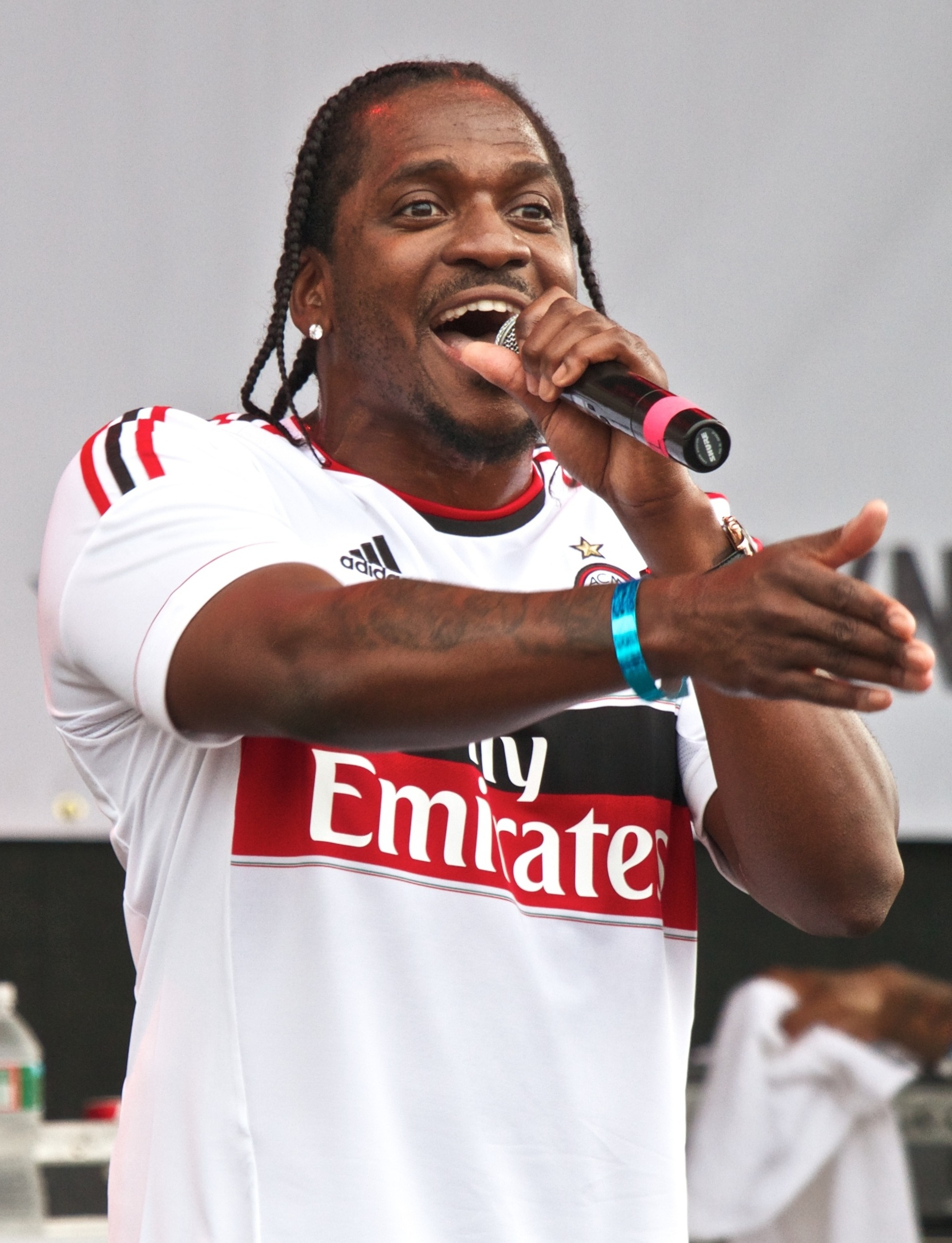
In 2015, Pusha T was appointed as the President of the label.

In late 2011, plans were announced for a release of a compilation album, later entitled Cruel Summer. The album's lead single "Mercy", was released on April 6, 2012, and features verses from Kanye West, Pusha T and Big Sean, as well as GOOD Music affiliate 2 Chainz. The album was also preceded by the singles "New God Flow" and "Clique", the latter of which peaked at number 12 on the US Billboard Hot 100. It features West and Big Sean rapping alongside Jay-Z. Cruel Summer was released on September 18, 2012. It was accompanied by the eponymous short film Cruel Summer, which was shot in Qatar; the film premiered at the Cannes Film Festival.

In January 2013, Scottish record producer and DJ Hudson Mohawke, announced that he had signed to the production arm of GOOD Music — Very Good Beats. On April 2, 2013, Kid Cudi announced on Power 106 that he was no longer with the label, leaving on amicable terms. Cudi felt he was "underused" and would have preferred to record something particular for Yeezus (2013). On June 29, 2013, producer Hit-Boy of Very Good Beats announced that his contract expired and that he was no longer signed to GOOD Music. Former American Apparel model Kacy Hill was signed to the label December 2014, after appearing as a backup dancer on West's Yeezus Tour. In March 2015, GOOD Music signed HXLT.

In November 2015, West appointed Pusha T the president of GOOD Music, while record executive Steven Victor was appointed COO. In January 2016, Mos Def retired from music announcing it in a freestyle released in conjunction with West's G.O.O.D. Fridays series. On June 3, 2016, Kanye West announced GOOD Music's upcoming album, Cruel Winter, in an interview with Big Boy.

On September 7, 2016, West announced that former Young Money Entertainment/Cash Money Records artist Tyga, signed a record deal with GOOD Music. Despite this, Tyga's only release with the label would be his 2017 single "Feel Me" in a joint venture with Interscope Records. Later that day, Pusha T announced Atlanta-based rap trio Migos had signed a management deal with the label. However, in January 2017, Migos clarified that although there were discussions for a management deal, nothing had come to fruition. On September 9, 2016, the official GOOD Music Twitter account uploaded an image of an updated artist roster with the caption "THIS IS GOOD MUSIC". The image indicated that several artists had either left or been removed by the label, including D'banj, Malik Yusef, Ryan McDermott, and Mr Hudson. Later that month, in a radio interview with The Breakfast Club, John Legend announced that his fifth studio album, Darkness and Light, would be his last with GOOD Music.

GOOD was advertised as one of the headlining acts of the ill-fated Fyre Festival in 2017; however, the exact member(s) of the label that were to perform were never established.

In May 2017, Pusha T signed Francis and the Lights to GOOD Music. In February 2018, Pusha T followed up by signing Valee with GOOD Music as well.

=== 2018–present ===
In 2018, West revealed he would produce upcoming albums by GOOD Music label-mates Pusha T and Teyana Taylor, as well as Nas. Pusha T's Daytona, "the first project out of Wyoming", was released in May to critical acclaim, although the album's artwork—a photograph of deceased singer Whitney Houston's bathroom that West paid $85,000 to license—attracted some controversy. The following week, West released his eighth studio album, Ye. West has suggested that he scrapped the original recordings of the album and re-recorded it within a month. The week after, West released a collaborative album with former GOOD Music artist Kid Cudi, titled Kids See Ghosts, named after their group of the same name. West also completed production work on Nas' Nasir and Teyana Taylor's K.T.S.E., which were released in June 2018.

On October 29, 2021, Big Sean announced on Twitter that after 14 years, he has stepped away from Kanye West's GOOD Music label, saying "That's a forever brotherhood, but business wise, I had to start getting a bigger cut! I worked my way out that deal." Afterwards, West would appear on the program Drink Champs hosted by N.O.R.E. and DJ EFN, where he would talk with them about different topics, one of them being John Legend and Big Sean leaving his label, where West would state "I already decided that when I die on my tombstone it's going to say, 'I deserve to be here because I signed Big Sean,'" as well as "The worst thing I've ever done was sign Big Sean." Before the episode, Big Sean said on Twitter "I just got asked to be on the next Drink Champs so I'm assuming Ye talkin' crazy." and would also share a photo of him and West from after the interview, writing "Was just [with] this man, he ain't say none of that!"

On October 24, 2022, it was revealed that Def Jam had officially parted ways with West and GOOD was no longer distributed by their label. This comes as a response to West's recent controversies involving actions deemed as antisemitic and racist, though it was revealed that West was already released from Def Jam following the release of Donda as the album completed his album contract with the label. However, as of 2026, 070 Shake continues to have her music distributed by Def Jam alongside GOOD.

On December 19, 2022, Pusha T announced that he was no longer on speaking terms with West and has stepped down from his post as President of GOOD Music and is officially off the imprint.

In 2023, a 2018 video of West publicly disavowing the company leaked online. In the video, West chastised his lack of control of the label during a phone call with former manager Scooter Braun, to where he said: "[I]t's gon' be a get me out this motherfucking GOOD Music shit now. And Scooter, ain't gon' be no 'I'm still putting my name on this shit.' I need to get rid of GOOD Music because I'm great. And guess what good is? The enemy of great."

== Roster ==
=== Current artists ===
Act	Year signed	Releases under the label
Kanye West	Founder	4
070 Shake	2016	3
Sheck Wes	2018	1

=== Former artists ===
Act	Years on the label	Releases under the label
GLC	2004–2006	—
Tony Williams	2004–2010	1
Common	2004–2010	3
Consequence	2004–2011	1
John Legend	2004–2016	6
Sa-Ra	2005–2007	—
Malik Yusef	2005–2016	1
Big Sean	2007–2022	7
Kid Cudi	2008–2013	3
Mr Hudson	2009–2016	1
Mos Def	2010–2016	—
Pusha T	2010–2022	6
D'banj	2011–2016	—
Q-Tip	2012	—
WZRD	2012–2013	1
Teyana Taylor	2012–2020	3
Kacy Hill	2014–2019	2
HXLT	2015–2019	1
Desiigner	2016–2019	2
Twenty88	2016–2021	1
Tyga	2017	—
Valee	2018–2019	2
Kids See Ghosts	2018-2022	1

== Very Good Beats ==
G.O.O.D. Music also has a production wing known as Very Good Beats; this serves as a group of in-house producers.

=== Current producers ===
- 88-Keys
- Benny Cassette
- Boogz & Tapez
- Charlie Heat
- Evian Christ
- Hudson Mohawke
- Jeff Bhasker
- Kanye West
- Lifted
- Mike Dean
- No I.D.
- Noah Goldstein
- Symbolyc One (S1)
- Travis Scott

=== Former producers ===
- Brian "AllDay" Miller
- Che Pope
- Devo Springsteen
- Don Jazzy
- Hit-Boy
- Keezo Kane
- Keyon Christ (a.k.a. Mitus)
- Q-Tip

== Discography ==
=== Studio albums ===
Artist	Album	Details
John Legend	Get Lifted (released with Columbia)	Released: December 28, 2004; Chart position: #4 U.S.; RIAA certification: Platinum
Common	Be (released with Geffen)	Released: May 24, 2005; Chart position: #2 U.S.; RIAA certification: Platinum
John Legend	Once Again (released with Columbia)	Released: October 24, 2006; Chart position: #3 U.S.; RIAA certification: Platinum
Consequence	Don't Quit Your Day Job! (released with Columbia)	Released: March 6, 2007; Chart position: #113 U.S.; RIAA certification: —
Common	Finding Forever (released with Geffen)	Released: July 31, 2007; Chart position: #1 U.S.; RIAA certification: Gold
John Legend	Evolver (released with Columbia)	Released: October 28, 2008; Chart position: #4 U.S.; RIAA certification: Gold
Common	Universal Mind Control (released with Geffen)	Released: December 9, 2008; Chart position: #12 U.S.; RIAA certification: —
Kid Cudi	Man on the Moon: The End of Day (released with Universal Motown)	Released: September 15, 2009; Chart position: #4 U.S.; RIAA certification: Platinum
Mr Hudson	Straight No Chaser (released with Mercury)	Released: October 19, 2009; Chart position: #25 UK; RIAA certification: —
John Legend and The Roots	Wake Up! (released with Columbia)	Released: September 21, 2010; Chart position: #8 U.S.; RIAA certification: —
Kid Cudi	Man on the Moon II: The Legend of Mr. Rager (released with Universal Motown)	Released: November 9, 2010; Chart position: #3 U.S.; RIAA certification: Platinum
Big Sean	Finally Famous (released with Def Jam)	Released: June 28, 2011; Chart position: #3 U.S.; RIAA certification: Platinum
WZRD	WZRD (released with Republic)	Released: February 28, 2012; Chart position: #3 U.S.; RIAA certification: —
GOOD Music	Cruel Summer (released with Def Jam)	Released: September 12, 2012; Chart position: #2 U.S.; RIAA certification: Platinum
Kid Cudi	Indicud (released with Republic)	Released: April 16, 2013; Chart position: #2 U.S.; RIAA certification: Gold
Big Sean	Hall of Fame (released with Def Jam)	Released: August 27, 2013; Chart position: #3 U.S.; RIAA certification: Gold
John Legend	Love in the Future (released with Columbia)	Released: September 3, 2013; Chart position: #4 U.S.; RIAA certification: Gold
Pusha T	My Name Is My Name (released with Def Jam)	Released: October 8, 2013; Chart position: #4 U.S.; RIAA certification: —
Teyana Taylor	VII (released with Def Jam)	Released: November 4, 2014; Chart position: #19 U.S.; RIAA certification: —
Big Sean	Dark Sky Paradise (released with Def Jam)	Released: February 24, 2015; Chart position: #1 U.S.; RIAA certification: Platinum
Pusha T	King Push – Darkest Before Dawn: The Prelude (released with Def Jam)	Released: December 18, 2015; Chart position: #20 U.S.; RIAA certification: —
Kanye West	The Life of Pablo (released with Def Jam)	Released: February 13, 2016; Chart position: #1 U.S.; RIAA certification: Platinum
HXLT	HXLT (released with Def Jam)	Released: February 26, 2016; Chart position: —; RIAA certification: —
Twenty88	Twenty88 (released with ARTium and Def Jam)	Released: April 1, 2016; Chart position: #5 U.S.; RIAA certification: —
John Legend	Darkness and Light (released with Columbia)	Released: December 2, 2016; Chart position: #14 U.S.; RIAA certification: —
Big Sean	I Decided (released with Def Jam)	Released: February 3, 2017; Chart position: #1 U.S.; RIAA certification: Platinum
Kacy Hill	Like a Woman (released with Def Jam)	Released: June 30, 2017; Chart position: —; RIAA certification: —
Big Sean and Metro Boomin	Double or Nothing (released with Republic and Def Jam)	Released: December 8, 2017; Chart position: #6 U.S.; RIAA certification: —
Pusha T	Daytona (released with Def Jam)	Released: May 25, 2018; Chart position: #3 U.S.; RIAA certification: —
Kanye West	Ye (released with Def Jam)	Released: June 1, 2018; Chart position: #1 U.S.; RIAA certification: Platinum
Kids See Ghosts	Kids See Ghosts (released with Def Jam)	Released: June 8, 2018; Chart position: #2 U.S.; RIAA certification: Gold
Teyana Taylor	K.T.S.E. (released with Def Jam)	Released: June 23, 2018; Chart position: #17 U.S.; RIAA certification: —
Sheck Wes	Mudboy (released with Cactus Jack and Interscope)	Released: October 5, 2018; Chart position: #17 U.S.; RIAA certification: —
Kanye West	Jesus Is King (released with Def Jam)	Released: October 25, 2019; Chart position: #1 U.S.; RIAA certification: Gold
070 Shake	Modus Vivendi (released with Def Jam)	Released: January 17, 2020; Chart position: —; RIAA certification: —
Teyana Taylor	The Album (released with Def Jam)	Released: June 19, 2020; Chart Position: #8 U.S.; RIAA certification: —
Big Sean	Detroit 2 (released with Def Jam)	Released: September 4, 2020; Chart position: #1 U.S.; RIAA certification: —
Kanye West	Donda (released with Def Jam)	Released : August 29, 2021; Chart position: #1 U.S.; RIAA certification: Platinum
Pusha T	It's Almost Dry (released with Def Jam)	Released : April 22, 2022; Chart position: #1 U.S.; RIAA certification: —
070 Shake	You Can't Kill Me (released with Def Jam)	Released: June 3, 2022; Chart position: —; RIAA certification: —
070 Shake	Petrichor (released with Def Jam)	Released: November 15, 2024; Chart position: —; RIAA certification: —

=== EPs ===
Artist	EP	Details
Pusha T	Fear of God II: Let Us Pray	Released: November 8, 2011; Chart position: #66 U.S.; RIAA certification: —
Kacy Hill	Bloo	Released: October 9, 2015; Chart position: —; RIAA certification: —
Valee	Good Job, You Found Me	Released: March 2, 2018; Chart position: —; RIAA certification: —
070 Shake	Glitter	Released: March 23, 2018; Chart position: —; RIAA certification: —
Desiigner	L.O.D.	Released: May 4, 2018; Chart position: #161 U.S.; RIAA certification: —

=== Mixtapes ===
Artist	Mixtape	Details
Malik Yusef	G.O.O.D. Morning, G.O.O.D. Night	Released: June 2, 2009; Chart position: —; RIAA certification: —
Tony Williams	Finding Dakota Grey	Released: March 2, 2010; Chart position: —; RIAA certification: —
Desiigner	New English	Released: June 26, 2016; Chart position: #22 U.S.; RIAA certification: —

== Personnel ==
=== Presidents ===
Name	Years	Reference
John Monopoly	2004–2007	
No I.D.	2008–2011	
Che Pope	2012–2015	
Pusha T	2015–2022	

=== COOs ===
Name	Years	Reference
Steven Victor	2015–2019	

== Operations ==
GOOD Music and its associated logo are trademarks of Mascotte Holdings, West's holding company founded in 2004.
