= Kanye West singles discography =

Singles recorded by American rapper

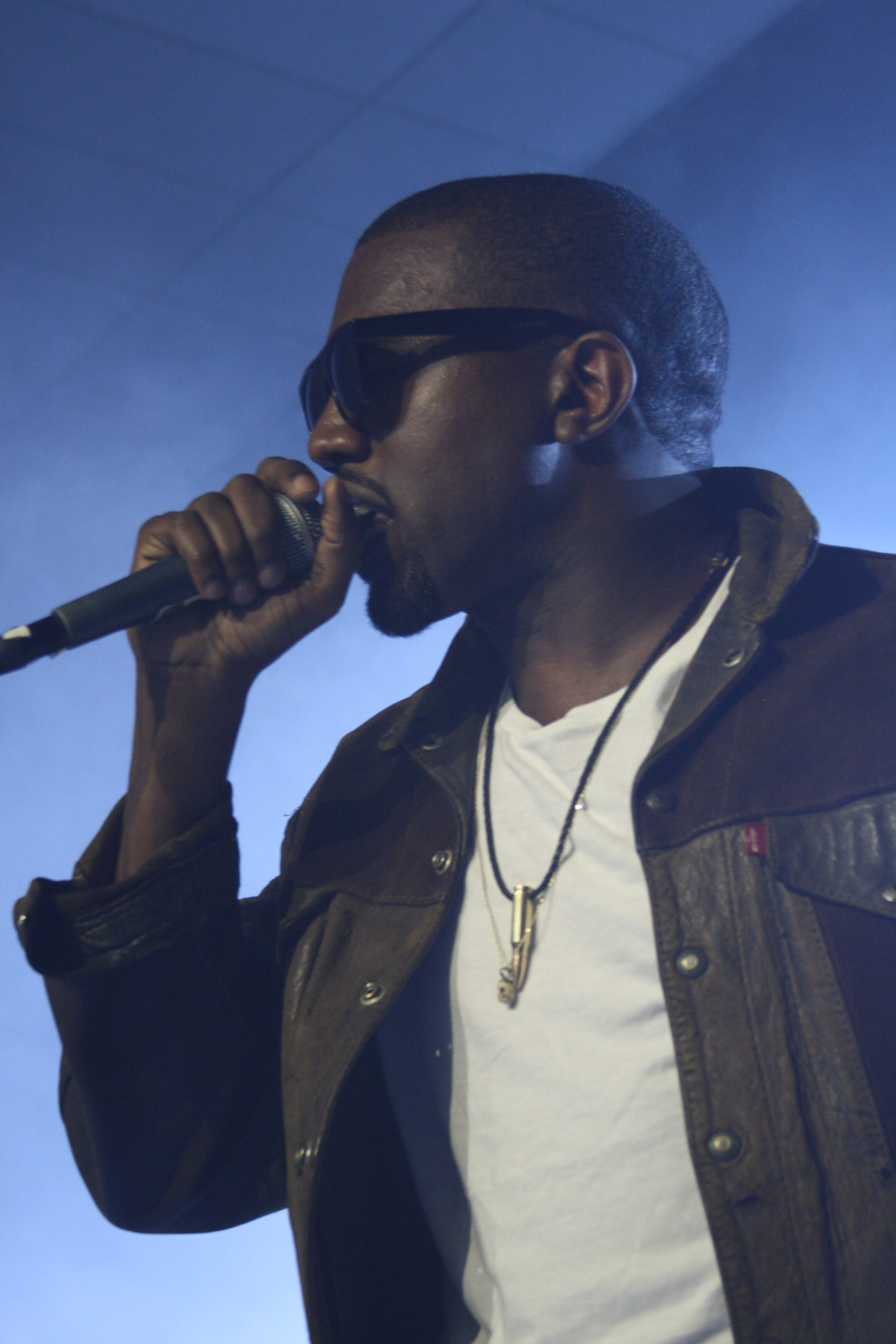
- West performing at South by Southwest in Austin, Texas, on March 21, 2009
- As lead artist: 140
- As featured artist: 85
- Promotional singles: 6
- Other charted songs: 69

American rapper Kanye West has released 140 singles as a lead artist, 85 as a featured artist, and six promotional singles and charted with 65 other songs. As of July 2022, West is one of only seven artists in the United States to be certified for over 100 million digital singles by the Recording Industry Association of America, having sold 133 million certified digital units as a solo artist. He is the second highest certified American digital singles artist in the United States, with 84 of his singles going platinum. His Billboard Hot 100 history reads; 177 entries, 81 top 40s, 21 top 10s, and five number-one singles. Elsewhere, West has 22 top-ten, and three number-one singles in the UK, as well as, six number ones in New Zealand. West ended the 2000s decade with the most number-one songs on the Hot Rap Songs chart, most digital song certifications by a male solo artist in the United States, and was tenth on Billboard's Top Hot 100 Artists of the 2000s chart. As of September 2012, he had the second-most 3 million+ selling digital songs.

In 2003, West collaborated with rapper Twista and singer Jamie Foxx on the song "Slow Jamz", which became West's first single to top the US Billboard Hot 100. In 2004, West's debut album The College Dropout produced four singles, including the Hot 100 top ten single "All Falls Down" and the Grammy Award-winner "Jesus Walks". In 2005, West released his second studio album Late Registration, which featured five singles, including "Touch the Sky", "Heard 'Em Say" and "Gold Digger", the latter spent ten weeks at number one on the Billboard Hot 100, broke digital download records, and was the ninth biggest Hot 100 hit of the 2000s decade.

In 2007, West's third studio album Graduation was released and was supported by five singles, including the Billboard Hot 100 number one single "Stronger" and the top ten single "Good Life". In 2008, West's fourth album 808s & Heartbreak was released and featured two top three singles, "Love Lockdown" and "Heartless". The former became just the second song by a non-American Idol artist to debut in the top three of the Hot 100 of the decade. From 2008 to 2009, West collaborated with other recording artists on multiple Hot 100 top ten singles, including "American Boy" by singer Estelle, "Swagga Like Us" by rappers Jay-Z, Lil Wayne and T.I., "Knock You Down" by singer Keri Hilson, "Run This Town" by Jay-Z and singer Rihanna, and "Forever" with rappers Drake, Lil Wayne and Eminem.

In 2010, West released his fifth studio album My Beautiful Dark Twisted Fantasy; four singles were released from the album, all of which reached the top 25 on the Billboard Hot 100: "Power", "Monster", "Runaway" and "All of the Lights". The following year, West collaborated with American singer Katy Perry on a remix of her song "E.T." which hit number one on the Billboard Hot 100, marking West's fourth number one single on the chart. Watch the Throne, a collaboration with Jay-Z, produced seven singles, including the Billboard Hot 100 top 25 singles "H•A•M", "Otis" and "Niggas in Paris". West's sixth studio album Yeezus, released in 2013, featured the singles "Black Skinhead" and "Bound 2".

"FourFiveSeconds", a 2015 collaboration with Rihanna and musician Paul McCartney, became a top five hit on the Hot 100 and a top ten hit in several other countries. The singles "Famous", "Father Stretch My Hands", which was released as a two-part single, and "Fade" were released in support of West's seventh studio album The Life of Pablo, released in 2016 with singer Post Malone. "Yikes" was released as the first single from Kanye's eighth studio album Ye in 2018 and performed best in Canada by peaking at number 6 on the Canadian Hot 100 and "All Mine" was the second single to be released from the album, which performed best in New Zealand by reaching number 5 on the NZ Top 40 chart.

== Singles ==
=== As lead artist ===
List of singles as lead artist, with selected chart positions and certifications, showing year released and album name
Title	Year	Peak chart positions										Certifications	Album
Title	Year	US	US R&B/HH	US Rap	AUS	CAN	GER	IRL	NZ	UK	WW	Certifications	Album
"Through the Wire"	2003	15	8	4	81	—	61	24	16	9	—	RIAA: 3× Platinum; BPI: Platinum; RMNZ: 2× Platinum	The College Dropout
"All Falls Down" (featuring Syleena Johnson)	2004	7	4	2	—	9	72	23	19	10	—	RIAA: 6× Platinum; BPI: 3× Platinum; IFPI Denmark: Platinum; RMNZ: 5× Platinum	The College Dropout
"Jesus Walks"	2004	11	2	3	37	4	—	18	—	16	—	RIAA: 3× Platinum; BPI: Platinum; IFPI Denmark: Gold; RMNZ: Platinum	The College Dropout
"The New Workout Plan"	2004	—	59	—	—	—	—	—	—	—	—	RIAA: Platinum	The College Dropout
"Diamonds from Sierra Leone"	2005	43	21	11	52	—	67	19	52	8	—	RIAA: Platinum; BPI: Silver	Late Registration
"Gold Digger" (featuring Jamie Foxx)	2005	1	1	1	1	— (Note: "Gold Digger" did not enter the Canadian Hot 100, but peaked at number 10 on the Hot Canadian Digital Songs chart.)	35	3	1	2	—	RIAA: 13× Platinum; RIAA: Platinum (Mastertone); ARIA: 4× Platinum; BPI: 4× Platinum; BVMI: Gold; IFPI Denmark: 2× Platinum; RMNZ: 7× Platinum	Late Registration
"Heard 'Em Say" (featuring Adam Levine)	2005	26	17	12	27	19	95	23	15	22	—	RIAA: Platinum; BPI: Silver; RMNZ: Gold	Late Registration
"Touch the Sky" (featuring Lupe Fiasco)	2006	42	23	10	10	—	97	14	16	6	—	RIAA: 2× Platinum; ARIA: Platinum; BPI: 2× Platinum; IFPI Denmark: Gold; RMNZ: Platinum	Late Registration
"Impossible" (featuring Twista, Keyshia Cole and BJ)	2006	— (Note: "Impossible" did not enter the Billboard Hot 100, but peaked at number three on the Bubbling Under Hot 100 Singles chart.)	54	—	—	—	—	—	—	—	—		Mission: Impossible III soundtrack
"Drive Slow" (featuring Paul Wall and GLC)	2006	—	—	—	—	—	—	—	—	—	—	RIAA: Gold	Late Registration
"Classic (Better Than I've Ever Been)" (with KRS-One, Nas and Rakim)	2007	—	—	—	—	—	—	—	—	—	—		Non-album single
"Can't Tell Me Nothing"	2007	41	20	8	—	16	—	—	—	107	—	RIAA: 7× Platinum; ARIA: Gold; BPI: Platinum; BVMI: Gold; IFPI Denmark: Gold; RMNZ: 2× Platinum	Graduation
"Stronger"	2007	1	30	3	2	1	17	2	18	1	—	RIAA: 14× Platinum; RIAA: Platinum (Mastertone); ARIA: 8× Platinum; BPI: 4× Platinum; BVMI: 5× Gold; IFPI Denmark: 2× Platinum; RMNZ: 5× Platinum	Graduation
"Good Life" (featuring T-Pain)	2007	7	3	1	21	23	78	24	11	23	—	RIAA: 6× Platinum; RIAA: Platinum (Mastertone); BPI: Platinum; IFPI Denmark: Gold; RMNZ: 2× Platinum	Graduation
"Flashing Lights" (featuring Dwele)	2007	29	12	2	82	54	—	21	—	29	196	RIAA: 9× Platinum; BPI: 2x Platinum; BVMI: Gold; IFPI Denmark: Platinum; RMNZ: 4× Platinum	Graduation
"Homecoming" (featuring Chris Martin)	2008	69	16	9	32	79	17	5	22	9	—	RIAA: 4× Platinum; ARIA: Gold; BPI: 2x Platinum; BVMI: Gold; IFPI Denmark: Gold; RMNZ: 4× Platinum	Graduation
"Love Lockdown"	2008	3	26	—	18	5	8	4	11	8	—	RIAA: 5× Platinum; ARIA: Gold; BPI: Platinum; BVMI: Gold; IFPI Denmark: Gold; RMNZ: Platinum	808s & Heartbreak
"Heartless"	2008	2	4	1	40	8	37	11	6	10	143	RIAA: 14× Platinum; RIAA: Platinum (Mastertone); ARIA: 4× Platinum; BPI: 3× Platinum; BVMI: Gold; IFPI Denmark: 2× Platinum; RMNZ: 5× Platinum	808s & Heartbreak
"Amazing" (featuring Young Jeezy)	2009	81	65	22	—	— (Note: "Amazing" did not enter the Canadian Hot 100, but peaked at number 63 on the Hot Canadian Digital Songs chart.)	—	—	—	—	—	RIAA: 2× Platinum	808s & Heartbreak
"Paranoid" (featuring Mr Hudson)	2009	— (Note: "Paranoid" did not enter the Billboard Hot 100, but peaked at number 18 on the Bubbling Under Hot 100 Singles chart.)	—	—	90	—	—	—	—	—	—	RIAA: Platinum	808s & Heartbreak
"Forever" (with Drake, Lil Wayne and Eminem)	2009	8	2	1	99	26	—	41	—	42	—	RIAA: 6× Platinum; ARIA: 2× Platinum; BPI: Platinum; RMNZ: 2× Platinum	Music Inspired by More than a Game / Relapse: Refill
"Power"	2010	22	22	14	100	49	—	30	—	36	—	RIAA: 7× Platinum; BPI: 2× Platinum; BVMI: Platinum; IFPI Denmark: Platinum; RMNZ: 3× Platinum	My Beautiful Dark Twisted Fantasy
"Runaway" (featuring Pusha T)	2010	12	30	9	46	13	—	18	—	23	145	RIAA: 7× Platinum; ARIA: Platinum; BPI: 2× Platinum; BVMI: Gold; IFPI Denmark: Platinum; RMNZ: 4× Platinum	My Beautiful Dark Twisted Fantasy
"Monster" (featuring Jay-Z, Rick Ross, Nicki Minaj and Bon Iver)	2010	18	30	15	91	43	—	—	—	111	—	RIAA: 3× Platinum; BPI: Platinum; RMNZ: Platinum	My Beautiful Dark Twisted Fantasy
"All of the Lights" (featuring Rihanna and Kid Cudi)	2010	18	2	2	24	53	—	13	13	15	—	RIAA: 8× Platinum; ARIA: 2× Platinum; BPI: 3× Platinum; BVMI: Gold; IFPI Denmark: Platinum; RMNZ: 4× Platinum	My Beautiful Dark Twisted Fantasy
"Christmas in Harlem" (featuring Cyhi the Prynce and Teyana Taylor)	2010	— (Note: "Christmas in Harlem" did not enter the Billboard Hot 100, but peaked at number 13 on the Bubbling Under Hot 100 Singles chart.)	— (Note: "Christmas in Harlem" did not enter the Hot R&B/Hip-Hop Songs chart, but peaked at number three on the Bubbling Under R&B/Hip-Hop Singles chart.)	—	—	—	—	—	—	—	—		Non-album single
"H•A•M" (with Jay-Z)	2011	23	24	15	78	47	—	40	—	30	—	RIAA: Platinum	Watch the Throne
"Otis" (with Jay-Z, featuring Otis Redding)	2011	12	2	2	42	37	—	41	—	28	—	RIAA: 4× Platinum; ARIA: Gold; BPI: Platinum; MC: Gold; IFPI Denmark: Gold; RMNZ: Platinum	Watch the Throne
"Lift Off" (with Jay-Z, featuring Beyoncé)	2011	— (Note: "Lift Off" did not enter the Billboard Hot 100, but peaked at number 21 on the Bubbling Under Hot 100 Singles chart.)	—	—	81	—	—	—	—	48	—		Watch the Throne
"Niggas in Paris" (with Jay-Z)	2011	5	1	1	66	16	40	22	38	10	—	RIAA: 12× Platinum; ARIA: 2× Platinum; BEA: Gold; BPI: 4× Platinum; BVMI: 2× Platinum; MC: Platinum; IFPI Denmark: 3× Platinum; RMNZ: 5× Platinum	Watch the Throne
"Why I Love You" (with Jay-Z, featuring Mr Hudson)	2011	—	—	—	—	—	—	—	—	87	—	BPI: Silver; RMNZ: Gold	Watch the Throne
"Gotta Have It" (with Jay-Z)	2011	69	14	13	—	—	—	—	—	—	—	RIAA: Platinum; BPI: Silver; RMNZ: Gold	Watch the Throne
"No Church in the Wild" (with Jay-Z, featuring Frank Ocean)	2012	72	31	20	—	92	—	55	—	37	—	RIAA: 3× Platinum; BPI: Platinum; IFPI Denmark: Platinum; RMNZ: Platinum	Watch the Throne
"Mercy" (with Big Sean, Pusha T and 2 Chainz)	2012	13	1	1	60	46	—	—	—	55	—	RIAA: 8× Platinum; BPI: Gold; IFPI Denmark: Gold; RMNZ: 2× Platinum	Cruel Summer
"Cold" (featuring DJ Khaled)	2012	86	69	—	—	85	—	—	—	—	—	RIAA: Gold	Cruel Summer
"New God Flow" (with Pusha T)	2012	89	43	—	—	66	—	—	—	—	—		Cruel Summer
"Clique" (with Jay-Z and Big Sean)	2012	12	2	2	39	17	—	—	—	22	—	RIAA: 4× Platinum; BPI: Gold; IFPI Denmark: Gold; RMNZ: Platinum	Cruel Summer
"Black Skinhead"	2013	69	21	15	58	66	—	55	—	34	—	RIAA: 3× Platinum; BPI: 2x Platinum; IFPI Denmark: Platinum; RMNZ: 2× Platinum	Yeezus
"Bound 2"	2013	12	3	3	50	74	—	68	—	55	104	RIAA: 6× Platinum; ARIA: 3× Platinum; BPI: 2x Platinum; IFPI Denmark: Gold; RMNZ: 4× Platinum	Yeezus
"Only One" (featuring Paul McCartney)	2014	35	11	—	8	31	32	43	8	28	—	RIAA: Platinum; IFPI Denmark: Gold	Non-album singles
"FourFiveSeconds" (with Rihanna and Paul McCartney)	2015	4	1	—	1	4	3	1	1	3	—	RIAA: 3× Platinum; ARIA: 11× Platinum; BEA: Platinum; BPI: 3× Platinum; BVMI: 3× Gold; IFPI Denmark: 3× Platinum; IFPI SWI: Platinum; SNEP: Gold; RMNZ: 7× Platinum	Non-album singles
"All Day" (featuring Theophilus London, Allan Kingdom and Paul McCartney)	2015	15	6	4	42	28	57	77	38	8	—	RIAA: Platinum; BPI: Silver; RMNZ: Gold	Non-album singles
"Famous"	2016	34	13	8	43	31	—	28	28	33	—	RIAA: 4× Platinum; ARIA: Gold; BPI: Platinum; BVMI: Gold; MC: Platinum; IFPI Denmark: Platinum; RMNZ: 2× Platinum; SNEP: Gold	The Life of Pablo
"Father Stretch My Hands, Pt. 1"	2016	37	14	9	—	51	—	74	— (Note: "Father Stretch My Hands, Pt. 1" did not enter the NZ Top 40 Singles Chart, but peaked at number eight on the NZ Heatseeker Singles Chart.)	54	145	RIAA: 7× Platinum; BPI: 2x Platinum; IFPI Denmark: Gold; RMNZ: 4× Platinum; SNEP: Gold	The Life of Pablo
"Pt. 2"	2016	54	18	11	—	60	—	87	—	70	—	RIAA: 2× Platinum; BPI: Silver; RMNZ: Gold	The Life of Pablo
"Champions" (with Gucci Mane, Big Sean, 2 Chainz, Travis Scott, Yo Gotti, Quavo and Desiigner)	2016	71	22	15	—	73	—	—	—	128	—	RIAA: Platinum; BPI: Silver; IFPI Denmark: Gold; RMNZ: Gold	Non-album single
"Fade"	2016	47	12	—	69	37	—	75	—	50	—	RIAA: 2× Platinum; BPI: Gold; RMNZ: Gold; SNEP: Gold	The Life of Pablo
"Lift Yourself"	2018	— (Note: "Lift Yourself" did not enter the Billboard Hot 100, but peaked at number two on the Bubbling Under Hot 100 Singles chart.)	—	—	—	—	—	94	— (Note: "Lift Yourself" did not enter the NZ Top 40 Singles Chart, but peaked at number six on the NZ Heatseeker Singles Chart.)	—	—	RIAA: Platinum	Non-album singles
"Ye vs. the People" (featuring T.I.)	2018	85	—	—	—	—	—	—	— (Note: "Ye vs. the People" did not enter the NZ Top 40 Singles Chart, but peaked at number three on the NZ Heatseeker Singles Chart.)	—	—		Non-album singles
"Yikes"	2018	8	7	6	18	6	84	16	11	10	—	RIAA: Platinum; BPI: Silver; RMNZ: Gold	Ye
"All Mine"	2018	11	9	8	10	12	75	13	5	11	—	RIAA: 3× Platinum; BPI: Gold; IFPI Denmark: Gold; RMNZ: Platinum	Ye
"XTCY"	2018	—	—	—	—	—	—	—	— (Note: "XTCY" did not enter the NZ Top 40 Singles Chart, but peaked at number 32 on the NZ Hot Singles Chart.)	—	—		Non-album single
"I Love It" (with Lil Pump)	2018	6	5	5	4	1	9	2	1	3	—	RIAA: 2× Platinum; ARIA: 3× Platinum; BPI: Platinum; BVMI: Gold; IFPI Denmark: Platinum; SNEP: Gold; RMNZ: 2× Platinum	Harverd Dropout
"Follow God"	2019	7	3	2	7	6	—	5	6	6	—	RIAA: 2× Platinum; BPI: Gold; RMNZ: Platinum; SNEP: Gold	Jesus Is King
"Closed on Sunday"	2019	17	8	—	19	20	87	19	26	13	—	RIAA: Gold	Jesus Is King
"Wash Us in the Blood" (featuring Travis Scott)	2020	49	20	—	31	77	—	32	— (Note: "Wash Us in the Blood" did not enter the NZ Top 40 Singles Chart, but peaked at number four on the NZ Hot Singles Chart.)	51	—		Non-album singles
"Nah Nah Nah" (solo or remix featuring DaBaby and 2 Chainz)	2020	—	—	—	—	—	—	—	— (Note: "Nah Nah Nah" did not enter the NZ Top 40 Singles Chart, but peaked at number 18 on the NZ Hot Singles Chart. The remix also did not enter the NZ Top 40 Singles Chart, but peaked at number 34 on the NZ Hot Singles Chart.)	—	—		Non-album singles
"Hurricane" (with the Weeknd featuring Lil Baby)	2021	6	1	1	4	4	37	7	3	7	5	RIAA: 2× Platinum; MC: Platinum; BPI: Silver; IFPI Denmark: Gold; RMNZ: Platinum	Donda
"Life of the Party" (with André 3000)	2021	— (Note: "Life of the Party" did not enter the Billboard Hot 100, but peaked at number 13 on the Bubbling Under Hot 100 chart.)	47	—	—	—	—	96	— (Note: "Life of the Party" did not enter the NZ Top 40 Singles Chart, but peaked at number 16 on the NZ Hot Singles Chart.)	—	—	RIAA: Gold	Donda
"Believe What I Say"	2021	28	15	13	17	29	—	—	—	—	26	RIAA: Gold; RMNZ: Gold	Donda
"Off the Grid"	2021	11	4	4	9	7	—	11	7	15	7	RIAA: Platinum; BPI: Silver; MC: Gold; RMNZ: Gold	Donda
"Eazy" (with the Game)	2022	49	13	9	—	35	—	20	35	32	35		Drillmatic – Heart vs. Mind and Donda 2
"City of Gods" (with Fivio Foreign and Alicia Keys)	2022	46	15	10	66	20	—	36	— (Note: "City of Gods" did not enter the NZ Top 40 Singles Chart, but peaked at number four on the NZ Hot Singles Chart.)	58	43	RIAA: Gold; MC: Gold	B.I.B.L.E. and Donda 2
"True Love" (with XXXTentacion)	2022	22	5	4	21	21	54	25	19	31	22	BPI: Silver; RMNZ: Gold	Look at Me: The Album and Donda 2
"Hot Shit" (with Cardi B and Lil Durk)	2022	13	7	5	39	28	—	60	— (Note: "Hot Shit" did not enter the NZ Top 40 Singles Chart, but peaked at number two on the NZ Hot Singles Chart.)	59	29		Non-album single
"Vultures" (with Ty Dolla Sign as ¥$ featuring Bump J and Lil Durk)	2023	34	15	11	95	24	—	—	39	—	27		Vultures 1
"Talking / Once Again" (with Ty Dolla $ign as ¥$ featuring North West)	2024	30	12	9	66	30	—	—	32	—	18		Vultures 1
"Carnival" (with Ty Dolla $ign as ¥$ and Rich the Kid featuring Playboi Carti)	2024	1	1	1	5	2	13	6	7	5	2	RIAA: 2× Platinum; BPI: Gold; RMNZ: Platinum; SNEP: Gold	Vultures 1
"Slide" (with Ty Dolla $ign as ¥$)	2024	88	25	22	—	84	—	—	— (Note: "Slide" did not enter the NZ Top 40 Singles Chart, but peaked at number four on the NZ Hot Singles Chart.)	92	154		Vultures 2
"WW3"	2025	—	—	—	—	—	—	—	— (Note: "WW3" did not enter the NZ Top 40 Singles Chart, but peaked at number 37 on the NZ Hot Singles Chart.)	—	—		Cuck
"Cousins"	2025	—	—	—	—	—	—	—	— (Note: "Cousins" did not enter the NZ Top 40 Singles Chart, but peaked at number 21on the NZ Hot Singles Chart.)	—	—		Cuck
"Heil Hitler"	2025	—	—	—	—	—	—	—	—	—	—		Cuck
"Alive" (with YoungBoy Never Broke Again)	2025	—	—	—	—	—	—	—	— (Note: "Alive" did not enter the NZ Top 40 Singles Chart, but peaked at number 25 on the NZ Hot Singles Chart.)	—	—		Non-album singles
"Gemini Season"	2026	—	—	—	—	—	—	—	—	—	—		Non-album singles
"—" denotes a recording that did not chart or was not released in that territory.

=== As featured artist ===
List of singles as featured artist, with selected chart positions and certifications, showing year released and album name
Title	Year	Peak chart positions										Certifications	Album
Title	Year	US	US R&B/HH	US Rap	AUS	CAN	GER	IRL	NZ	UK	WW	Certifications	Album
"Welcome 2 Chicago" (Abstract Mindstate featuring Kanye West)	2001	—	—	—	—	—	—	—	—	—	—		Non-album single
"Slow Jamz" (Twista featuring Kanye West and Jamie Foxx)	2003	1	1	1	26	—	58	30	9	3	—	RIAA: 3× Platinum; BPI: Gold; RMNZ: 2× Platinum	Kamikaze / The College Dropout
"This Way" (Dilated Peoples featuring Kanye West)	2004	78	41	22	—	—	—	—	—	35	—		Neighborhood Watch
"Selfish" (Slum Village featuring Kanye West and John Legend)	2004	55	20	15	—	—	—	—	—	129	—		Detroit Deli (A Taste of Detroit)
"Talk About Our Love" (Brandy featuring Kanye West)	2004	36	16	—	28	—	89	27	—	6	—		Afrodisiac
"Hold On" (Remix) (Dwele featuring Kanye West)	2004	—	53	—	—	—	—	—	—	—	—		Subject
"Real Love" (Rell featuring Kanye West and Consequence)	2004	—	— (Note: "Real Love" did not enter the Hot R&B/Hip-Hop Songs chart, but peaked at number 13 on the Bubbling Under R&B/Hip-Hop Singles chart.)	—	—	—	—	—	—	—	—		Non-album single
"Higher" (Do or Die featuring Kanye West)	2004	—	63	—	—	—	—	—	—	—	—		D.O.D.
"The Food" (Common featuring Kanye West and DJ Dummy)	2004	—	—	—	—	—	—	—	—	—	—		Be
"Number One" (John Legend featuring Kanye West)	2005	—	86	—	—	—	—	—	—	62	—		Get Lifted
"Down and Out" (Cam'ron featuring Kanye West and Syleena Johnson)	2005	94	29	20	—	—	—	—	—	—	—		Purple Haze
"The Corner" (Common featuring Kanye West and The Last Poets)	2005	— (Note: "The Corner" did not enter the Billboard Hot 100, but peaked at number ten on the Bubbling Under Hot 100 Singles chart.)	42	—	—	—	—	—	—	—	—		Be
"Go!" (Common featuring Kanye West and John Mayer)	2005	79	31	21	—	—	—	—	—	79	—		Be
"Pusha Man" (Bump J. featuring Kanye West)	2005	—	—	—	—	—	—	—	—	—	—		Non-album single
"Extravaganza" (Jamie Foxx featuring Kanye West)	2005	—	52	—	44	—	99	—	—	43	—		Unpredictable
"Brand New" (Rhymefest featuring Kanye West)	2005	—	—	—	—	—	—	30	—	32	—		Blue Collar
"Grammy Family" (DJ Khaled featuring Kanye West, Consequence and John Legend)	2006	—	— (Note: "Grammy Family" did not enter the Hot R&B/Hip-Hop Songs chart, but peaked at number 24 on the Bubbling Under R&B/Hip-Hop Singles chart.)	—	—	—	—	—	—	—	—		Listennn... the Album / Don't Quit Your Day Job!
"Number One" (Pharrell featuring Kanye West)	2006	57	40	—	—	—	—	—	—	31	—		In My Mind
"Wouldn't Get Far" (The Game featuring Kanye West)	2007	64	26	11	—	—	—	—	—	—	—	RMNZ: Gold	Doctor's Advocate
"Buy U a Drank (Shawty Snappin')" (Remix) (T-Pain featuring Kanye West)	2007	—	—	—	—	—	—	—	—	—	—		Non-album single
"Pro Nails" (Kid Sister featuring Kanye West)	2007	—	—	—	—	—	—	—	—	—	—		Ultraviolet
"I Still Love H.E.R." (Teriyaki Boyz featuring Kanye West)	2007	—	—	—	—	—	—	—	—	—	—		Serious Japanese
"Finer Things" (DJ Felli Fel featuring Kanye West, Jermaine Dupri, Fabolous and Ne-Yo)	2008	— (Note: "Finer Things" did not enter the Billboard Hot 100, but peaked at number one on the Bubbling Under Hot 100 Singles chart.)	80	8	—	—	—	—	—	—	—		Non-album single
"American Boy" (Estelle featuring Kanye West)	2008	9	55	—	3	9	5	2	5	1	—	RIAA: 2× Platinum; ARIA: Platinum; BEA: Gold; BPI: 5× Platinum; BVMI: Gold; IFPI Denmark: Platinum; RMNZ: 4× Platinum	Shine
"Put On" (Young Jeezy featuring Kanye West)	2008	12	3	1	—	46	—	—	—	—	—	RIAA: 3× Platinum; RMNZ: Gold	The Recession
"Everybody" (Fonzworth Bentley featuring Kanye West and André 3000)	2008	—	— (Note: "Everybody" did not enter the Hot R&B/Hip-Hop Songs chart, but peaked at number 11 on the Bubbling Under R&B/Hip-Hop Singles chart.)	—	—	—	—	—	—	—	—		C.O.L.O.U.R.S.
"Plastic" (Really Doe featuring Kanye West)	2008	—	—	—	—	—	—	—	—	—	—		First Impressions
"Stay Up! (Viagra)" (88-Keys featuring Kanye West)	2008	—	—	—	—	—	—	—	—	—	—		The Death of Adam
"Swagga Like Us" (Jay-Z and T.I. featuring Kanye West and Lil Wayne)	2008	5	11	4	—	19	—	—	—	33	—	RIAA: Platinum; MC: Gold	Paper Trail
"Go Hard" (DJ Khaled featuring Kanye West and T-Pain)	2008	69	53	19	—	—	—	—	—	—	—		We Global
"Knock You Down" (Keri Hilson featuring Kanye West and Ne-Yo)	2009	3	1	—	24	9	30	2	1	5	—	RIAA: 2× Platinum; ARIA: Gold; BPI: 2× Platinum; RMNZ: 4× Platinum	In a Perfect World...
"Kinda Like a Big Deal" (Clipse featuring Kanye West)	2009	—	— (Note: "Kinda Like a Big Deal" did not enter the Hot R&B/Hip-Hop Songs chart, but peaked at number 19 on the Bubbling Under R&B/Hip-Hop Singles chart.)	—	—	—	—	—	—	—	—		Til the Casket Drops
"The Big Screen" (GLC featuring Kanye West)	2009	—	—	—	—	—	—	—	—	—	—		Non-album single
"Walkin' on the Moon" (The-Dream featuring Kanye West)	2009	87	38	—	—	—	—	—	—	—	—		Love vs. Money
"Supernova" (Mr Hudson featuring Kanye West)	2009	— (Note: "Supernova" did not enter the Billboard Hot 100, but peaked at number 12 on the Bubbling Under Hot 100 Singles chart.)	—	—	—	—	47	2	—	2	—	BPI: Gold	Straight No Chaser
"Gifted" (N.A.S.A. featuring Kanye West, Santigold and Lykke Li)	2009	—	—	—	—	—	—	—	—	—	—		The Spirit of Apollo
"Make Her Say" (Kid Cudi featuring Kanye West and Common)	2009	43	39	11	62	78	85	—	35	67	—		Man on the Moon: The End of Day
"Maybach Music 2" (Rick Ross featuring T-Pain, Kanye West and Lil Wayne)	2009	92	54	—	—	—	—	—	—	—	—		Deeper Than Rap
"Digital Girl" (Remix) (Jamie Foxx featuring Kanye West, The-Dream and Drake)	2009	92	38	—	—	—	—	—	—	—	—		Intuition
"Run This Town" (Jay-Z featuring Kanye West and Rihanna)	2009	2	3	1	9	6	18	3	9	1	—	RIAA: 6× Platinum; ARIA: Platinum; BPI: 2× Platinum; BVMI: Gold; IFPI Denmark: Platinum; RMNZ: 3× Platinum	The Blueprint 3
"Whatever U Want" (Consequence featuring Kanye West and John Legend)	2009	—	— (Note: "Whatever You Want" did not enter the Hot R&B/Hip-Hop Songs chart, but peaked at number four on the Bubbling Under R&B/Hip-Hop Singles chart.)	—	—	—	—	—	—	—	—		Non-album singles
"In for the Kill" (Remix) (La Roux featuring Kanye West)	2009	—	—	—	—	—	—	—	—	—	—		Non-album singles
"Ayyy Girl" (JYJ featuring Kanye West and Malik Yusef)	2010	—	—	—	—	—	—	—	—	—	—		The Beginning
"Erase Me" (Kid Cudi featuring Kanye West)	2010	22	— (Note: "Erase Me" did not enter the Hot R&B/Hip-Hop Songs chart, but peaked at number one on the Bubbling Under R&B/Hip-Hop Singles chart.)	—	50	12	—	49	22	58	—	RIAA: 2× Platinum; BPI: Silver; RMNZ: Platinum	Man on the Moon II: The Legend of Mr. Rager
"Start It Up" (Lloyd Banks featuring Kanye West, Ryan Leslie, Swizz Beatz and Fabolous)	2010	— (Note: "Start It Up" did not enter the Billboard Hot 100, but peaked at number five on the Bubbling Under Hot 100 Singles chart.)	52	20	—	—	—	—	—	—	—		H.F.M. 2 (Hunger for More 2)
"Live Fast, Die Young" (Rick Ross featuring Kanye West)	2010	—	89	—	—	—	—	—	—	—	—		Teflon Don
"Hurricane 2.0" (Thirty Seconds to Mars featuring Kanye West)	2010	—	—	—	67	—	45	—	—	193	—		This Is War
"E.T." (Katy Perry featuring Kanye West)	2011	1	83	—	5	1	9	5	—	3	—	RIAA: Diamond; ARIA: 6× Platinum; BPI: 2x Platinum; BVMI: Gold; MC: 7× Platinum; RMNZ: Platinum	Teenage Dream: The Complete Confection
"Marvin & Chardonnay" (Big Sean featuring Kanye West and Roscoe Dash)	2011	32	1	4	—	—	—	—	—	—	—	RIAA: Platinum	Finally Famous
"Amen" (Pusha T featuring Young Jeezy and Kanye West)	2011	—	—	—	—	—	—	—	—	—	—		Fear of God II: Let Us Pray
"I Wish You Would" (DJ Khaled featuring Kanye West and Rick Ross)	2012	78	37	19	—	—	—	—	—	—	—	RIAA: Gold	Kiss the Ring
"Pride N Joy" (Fat Joe featuring Kanye West, Miguel, Jadakiss, Mos Def, DJ Khaled, Roscoe Dash and Busta Rhymes)	2012	—	81	—	—	—	—	—	—	—	—		Non-album single
"Birthday Song" (2 Chainz featuring Kanye West)	2012	47	10	7	—	—	—	—	—	—	—	RIAA: 2× Platinum	Based on a T.R.U. Story
"Diamonds" (Remix) (Rihanna featuring Kanye West)	2012	—	—	—	—	—	—	—	—	—	—		Non-album single
"Another You" (The World Famous Tony Williams featuring Kanye West)	2012	—	—	—	—	—	—	—	—	—	—		King or the Fool
"Thank You" (Busta Rhymes featuring Kanye West, Lil Wayne and Q-Tip)	2013	—	— (Note: "Thank You" did not enter the Hot R&B/Hip-Hop Songs chart, but peaked at number seven on the Bubbling Under R&B/Hip-Hop Singles chart.)	—	52	—	—	87	—	13	—	BPI: Silver	E.L.E.2 (Extinction Level Event 2)
"I Won" (Future featuring Kanye West)	2014	98	26	17	—	—	—	—	—	169	—	RIAA: Platinum	Honest
"Nobody" (Chief Keef featuring Kanye West)	2014	—	—	—	—	—	—	—	—	—	—		Nobody
"Blessings" (Big Sean featuring Drake and Kanye West)	2015	28	10	5	—	77	—	—	—	139	—	RIAA: 4× Platinum; BPI: Silver	Dark Sky Paradise
"U Mad" (Vic Mensa featuring Kanye West)	2015	—	— (Note: "U Mad" did not enter the Hot R&B/Hip-Hop Songs chart, but peaked at number six on the Bubbling Under R&B/Hip-Hop Singles chart.)	—	—	—	—	—	—	—	—	RIAA: Gold	Non-album single
"One Man Can Change the World" (Big Sean featuring Kanye West and John Legend)	2015	82	27	21	—	—	—	—	—	—	—	RIAA: Platinum	Dark Sky Paradise
"Pop Style" (Drake featuring Kanye West and Jay-Z as The Throne)	2016	16	4	3	44	20	—	92	—	33	—	RIAA: 2× Platinum; ARIA: Platinum; BPI: Gold	Views
"That Part" (Schoolboy Q featuring Kanye West)	2016	40	13	8	—	51	—	—	—	—	—	RIAA: 2× Platinum; RMNZ: Platinum	Blank Face LP
"Figure It Out" (French Montana featuring Kanye West and Nas)	2016	—	— (Note: "Figure It Out" did not enter the Hot R&B/Hip-Hop Songs chart, but peaked at number four on the Bubbling Under R&B/Hip-Hop Singles chart.)	—	—	—	—	—	—	—	—		MC4
"Ballin" (Juicy J featuring Kanye West)	2016	—	—	—	—	—	—	—	—	—	—		Non-album singles
"Tiimmy Turner" (Remix) (Desiigner featuring Kanye West)	2016	—	—	—	—	—	—	—	—	—	—		Non-album singles
"Castro" (Yo Gotti featuring Kanye West, Big Sean, 2 Chainz and Quavo)	2016	— (Note: "Castro" did not enter the Billboard Hot 100, but peaked at number 16 on the Bubbling Under Hot 100 Singles chart.)	— (Note: "Castro" did not enter the Hot R&B/Hip-Hop Songs chart, but peaked at number six on the Bubbling Under R&B/Hip-Hop Singles chart.)	—	—	—	—	—	—	—	—		White Friday (CM9)
"Feel Me" (Tyga featuring Kanye West)	2017	— (Note: "Feel Me" did not enter the Billboard Hot 100, but peaked at number four on the Bubbling Under Hot 100 Singles chart.)	48	—	—	90	—	—	—	—	—		BitchImTheShit2
"Love Yourself" (Mary J. Blige featuring Kanye West)	2017	—	—	—	—	—	—	—	—	—	—		Strength of a Woman
"Glow" (Drake featuring Kanye West)	2017	54	30	—	—	37	—	65	—	55	—		More Life
"Watch" (Travis Scott featuring Lil Uzi Vert and Kanye West)	2018	16	9	8	65	24	—	—	— (Note: "Watch" did not enter the NZ Top 40 Singles Chart, but peaked at number two on the NZ Heatseeker Singles Chart.)	53	—	RIAA: Platinum; RMNZ: Gold	Non-album single
"What Would Meek Do?" (Pusha T featuring Kanye West)	2018	75	37	—	—	84	—	—	— (Note: "What Would Meek Do?" did not enter the NZ Top 40 Singles Chart, but peaked at number nine on the NZ Heatseeker Singles Chart.)	100	—		Daytona
"Take Me to the Light" (Francis and the Lights featuring Bon Iver and Kanye West)	2019	—	—	—	—	—	—	—	—	—	—		Take Me to the Light
"Ego Death" (Ty Dolla Sign featuring Kanye West, FKA Twigs, and Skrillex)	2020	— (Note: "Ego Death" did not enter the Billboard Hot 100, but peaked at number seven on the Bubbling Under Hot 100 Singles chart.)	—	—	68	69	92	41	— (Note: "Ego Death" did not enter the NZ Top 40 Singles Chart, but peaked at number 33 on the NZ Hot Singles Chart.)	34	—	BPI: Silver; RMNZ: Gold	Featuring Ty Dolla Sign
"Smack DVD" (Saint Jhn featuring Kanye West)	2020	—	—	—	—	—	—	—	—	—	—		While the World Was Burning
"Keep It Burnin" (Future featuring Kanye West)	2022	15	10	9	—	33	—	—	—	—	26		I Never Liked You
"Daylight" (Vory featuring Kanye West)	2022	—	—	—	—	—	—	—	—	—	—		Lost Souls
"Burn Everything" (Sean Leon featuring Kanye West)	2022	—	—	—	—	—	—	—	—	—	—		Herd Immunity 1.0
"No Face" (Ghostface Killah featuring Kanye West)	2024	—	—	—	—	—	—	—	— (Note: "No Face" did not enter the NZ Top 40 Singles Chart, but peaked at number 13 on the NZ Hot Singles Chart.)	—	—		Set the Tone (Guns & Roses)
"Gimme a Second 2" (Rich the Kid featuring Kanye West & Ty Dolla Sign as ¥$)	2024	—	—	—	—	—	—	—	— (Note: "Gimme a Second 2" did not enter the NZ Top 40 Singles Chart, but peaked at number 16 on the NZ Hot Singles Chart.)	—	—		Life's a Gamble
"No Apologies" (Consequence featuring Kanye West)	2024	—	—	—	—	—	—	—	— (Note: "No Apologies" did not enter the NZ Top 40 Singles Chart, but peaked at number 13 on the NZ Hot Singles Chart.)	—	—		Non-album singles
"Wheels Fall Off" (Ty Dolla Sign featuring Kanye West)	2025	—	—	—	—	—	—	—	— (Note: "Wheels Fall Off" did not enter the NZ Top 40 Singles Chart, but peaked at number 14 on the NZ Hot Singles Chart.)	—	—		Non-album singles
"—" denotes a recording that did not chart or was not released in that territory.

=== Other collaborations ===
Title	Year	Peak chart positions						Album
Title	Year	US	AUS	CAN	IRL	NZ	UK	Album
"We Are the World 25 for Haiti" (as part of Artists for Haiti)	2010	2	18	7	9	8	50	Non-album single

== Promotional singles ==
List of songs, with selected chart positions and certifications, showing year released and album name
Title	Year	Peak chart positions								Certifications	Album
Title	Year	US	US R&B	US Rap	CAN	FRA	NZ Hot	UK	WW	Certifications	Album
"Scape Goat (The Fix)" (D'banj featuring Kanye West)	2013	—	—	—	—	—	—	—	—		D'Kings Men
"Facts"	2015	— (Note: "Facts" (Charlie Heat Version) did not enter the Billboard Hot 100, but peaked at number seven on the Bubbling Under Hot 100 Singles chart.)	—	—	—	—	—	151	—		Non-album single
"Real Friends"	2016	92	34	—	—	—	—	78	—	RIAA: Platinum; BPI: Silver; RMNZ: Gold	The Life of Pablo
"No More Parties in LA" (featuring Kendrick Lamar)	2016	— (Note: "No More Parties in LA" did not enter the Billboard Hot 100, but peaked at number three on the Bubbling Under Hot 100 Singles chart.)	—	—	—	—	—	133	—	RIAA: Platinum; BPI: Silver; RMNZ: Gold	The Life of Pablo
"30 Hours"	2016	—	— (Note: "30 Hours" did not enter the Hot R&B/Hip-Hop Songs chart, but peaked at number six on the Bubbling Under R&B/Hip-Hop Singles chart.)	—	—	—	—	143	—	RIAA: Platinum	The Life of Pablo
"Someday We'll All Be Free"	2022	—	—	—	—	—	—	—	—		Non-album singles
"Tina" (with The Game featuring Jim Jones)	2025	—	—	—	—	—	—	—	—		Non-album singles
"Lonely Roads" (with King Combs and North West featuring Jasmine Williams)	2025	—	—	—	—	—	—	—	—		Never Stop
"Preacher Man"	2025	57	17	14	65	—	14	— (Note: "Preacher Man" did not enter the UK singles chart, but peaked at 45 on the UK Independent Singles Chart and 28 on the UK Hip Hop and R&B Singles Chart.)	112		Bully
"Beauty and the Beast"	2025	85	23	—	93	—	19	—	—		Bully
"Damn"	2025	— (Note: "Damn" did not enter the Billboard Hot 100, but peaked at number one on the Bubbling Under Hot 100 chart.)	28	—	—	—	24	—	—		Bully
"Last Breath" (solo or featuring Peso Pluma)	2025	81	—	—	96	—	—	—	155		Bully
"Losing Your Mind"	2025	—	—	—	—	—	—	—	—		Bully
"—" denotes a recording that did not chart or was not released in that territory.

== Other charted and certified songs ==
List of songs, with selected chart positions and certifications, showing year released and album name
Title	Year	Peak chart positions										Certifications	Album
Title	Year	US	US R&B	US Rap	AUS	CAN	FRA	IRL	NZ	UK	WW	Certifications	Album
"The Bounce" (Jay-Z featuring Kanye West)	2002	—	— (Note: "The Bounce" did not enter the Hot R&B/Hip-Hop Songs chart, but peaked at number 12 on the Bubbling Under R&B/Hip-Hop Singles chart.)	—	—	—	—	—	—	—	—		The Blueprint 2: The Gift & The Curse
"Champions" (with Dame Dash, Beanie Sigel, Cam'ron, Young Chris and Twista)	2002	—	— (Note: "Champions" did not enter the Hot R&B/Hip-Hop Songs chart, but peaked at number nine on the Bubbling Under R&B/Hip-Hop Singles chart.)	—	—	—	—	—	—	—	—	RMNZ: Gold	Paid In Full/Dream Team
"My Baby" (Janet Jackson featuring Kanye West)	2004	—	— (Note: "My Baby" did not enter the Hot R&B/Hip-Hop Songs chart, but peaked at number nine on the Bubbling Under R&B/Hip-Hop Singles chart.)	—	—	—	—	—	—	—	—		Damita Jo
"We Don't Care"	2004	—	—	—	—	—	—	—	—	—	—	RIAA: Gold	The College Dropout
"Spaceship" (featuring GLC and Consequence)	2004	—	—	—	—	—	—	—	—	—	—	RIAA: Platinum	The College Dropout
"Get 'Em High" (featuring Talib Kweli and Common)	2004	—	—	—	—	—	—	—	—	—	—	RIAA: Gold	The College Dropout
"Two Words" (featuring Mos Def, Freeway and the Boys Choir of Harlem)	2004	—	—	—	—	—	—	—	—	—	—	RIAA: Gold	The College Dropout
"Family Business"	2004	—	—	—	—	—	—	—	—	—	—	RIAA: Gold; BPI: Silver; RMNZ: Gold	The College Dropout
"Never Let Me Down"	2004	—	—	—	—	—	—	—	—	—	—	BPI: Silver	The College Dropout
"Hey Mama"	2005	—	— (Note: "Hey Mama" did not enter the Hot R&B/Hip-Hop Songs chart, but peaked at number nine on the Bubbling Under R&B/Hip-Hop Singles chart.)	—	—	— (Note: "Hey Mama" did not enter the Canadian Hot 100, but peaked at number 64 on the Hot Canadian Digital Songs chart.)	—	—	—	—	—	RIAA: Platinum; BPI: Silver	Late Registration
"Roses"	2005	—	—	—	—	—	—	—	—	—	—	RIAA: Gold	Late Registration
"Addiction"	2005	—	—	—	—	—	—	—	—	—	—	RIAA: Gold	Late Registration
"We Major" (featuring Nas and Really Doe)	2005	—	—	—	—	—	—	—	—	—	—	RIAA: Gold	Late Registration
"Gone" (featuring Cam'ron and Consequence)	2005	18	6	4	—	—	168	—	—	—	—	RIAA: Gold	Late Registration
"Like This" (DJ Clue? featuring Kanye West and Fabolous)	2006	—	— (Note: "Like This" did not enter the Hot R&B/Hip-Hop Songs chart, but peaked at number 18 on the Bubbling Under R&B/Hip-Hop Singles chart.)	—	—	—	—	—	—	—	—		The Professional 3
"Good Morning"	2007	—	—	—	—	—	—	—	—	—	—	RIAA: 2× Platinum; BPI: Gold; RMNZ: Platinum	Graduation
"Champion"	2007	—	99	—	—	—	—	—	—	—	—	RIAA: 2× Platinum; BPI: Silver; RMNZ: Gold	Graduation
"I Wonder"	2007	—	—	—	—	—	—	—	—	—	—	RIAA: 5× Platinum; BPI: Platinum; RMNZ: 2× Platinum	Graduation
"Barry Bonds" (featuring Lil Wayne)	2007	—	— (Note: "Barry Bonds" did not enter the Hot R&B/Hip-Hop Songs chart, but peaked at number 24 on the Bubbling Under R&B/Hip-Hop Singles chart.)	—	—	—	—	—	—	—	—	RIAA: Gold	Graduation
"Drunk and Hot Girls" (featuring Mos Def)	2007	—	—	—	—	—	—	—	—	—	—	RIAA: Gold	Graduation
"Everything I Am"	2007	—	—	—	—	—	—	—	—	—	—	RIAA: Platinum; BPI: Silver; RMNZ: Platinum	Graduation
"The Glory"	2007	—	—	—	—	—	—	—	—	—	—	RIAA: Gold	Graduation
"Big Brother"	2007	—	— (Note: "Big Brother" did not enter the Hot R&B/Hip-Hop Songs chart, but peaked at number 19 on the Bubbling Under R&B/Hip-Hop Singles chart.)	—	—	—	—	—	—	—	—	RIAA: Gold	Graduation
"Billie Jean 2008" (with Michael Jackson)	2008	—	—	—	—	—	—	—	—	183	—		Thriller 25
"Beat Goes On" (Madonna featuring Kanye West)	2008	—	—	—	—	82	—	—	—	189	—		Hard Candy
"It's Over" (John Legend featuring Kanye West)	2008	—	— (Note: "It's Over" did not enter the Hot R&B/Hip-Hop Songs chart, but peaked at number 18 on the Bubbling Under R&B/Hip-Hop Singles chart.)	—	—	—	—	—	—	—	—		Evolver
"Therapy" (T-Pain featuring Kanye West)	2008	— (Note: "Therapy" did not enter the Billboard Hot 100, but peaked at number six on the Bubbling Under Hot 100 Singles chart.)	—	—	—	—	—	—	—	—	—		Three Ringz
"Say You Will"	2008	—	—	—	—	—	—	—	—	—	—	RIAA: Gold	808s & Heartbreak
"Welcome to Heartbreak" (featuring Kid Cudi)	2008	—	—	—	—	—	—	—	—	112	—	RIAA: Gold	808s & Heartbreak
"RoboCop"	2008	—	—	—	—	—	—	—	—	—	—	RIAA: Gold	808s & Heartbreak
"Street Lights"	2008	—	—	—	—	—	—	—	—	—	—	RIAA: Gold	808s & Heartbreak
"See You in My Nightmares" (featuring Lil Wayne)	2008	21	—	—	—	22	—	—	—	111	—	RIAA: Gold	808s & Heartbreak
"Coldest Winter"	2008	—	—	—	—	—	—	—	—	—	—	RIAA: Gold	
"Ego" (Remix) (Beyoncé featuring Kanye West)	2009	—	—	—	—	—	—	—	—	153	—		Above and Beyoncé: Video Collection & Dance Mixes
"Dark Fantasy"	2010	60	— (Note: "Dark Fantasy" did not enter the Hot R&B/Hip-Hop Songs chart, but peaked at number ten on the Bubbling Under R&B/Hip-Hop Singles chart.)	—	—	67	—	—	—	—	—	RIAA: Platinum; BPI: Silver; RMNZ: Gold	My Beautiful Dark Twisted Fantasy
"Gorgeous" (featuring Kid Cudi and Raekwon)	2010	— (Note: "Gorgeous" did not enter the Billboard Hot 100, but peaked at number 23 on the Bubbling Under Hot 100 Singles chart.)	—	—	—	—	—	—	—	—	—	RIAA: Platinum; BPI: Silver; RMNZ: Gold	My Beautiful Dark Twisted Fantasy
"All of the Lights (Interlude)	2010	—	—	—	—	—	—	—	—	—	—	RIAA: Gold	My Beautiful Dark Twisted Fantasy
"So Appalled" (featuring Jay-Z, Pusha T, Cyhi the Prynce, Swizz Beatz and RZA)	2010	—	— (Note: "So Appalled" did not enter the Hot R&B/Hip-Hop Songs chart, but peaked at number 14 on the Bubbling Under R&B/Hip-Hop Singles chart.)	—	—	—	—	—	—	—	—	RIAA: Gold	My Beautiful Dark Twisted Fantasy
"Devil in a New Dress"	2010	—	—	—	—	—	—	—	—	—	—	RIAA: 3× Platinum; BPI: Platinum; IFPI DEN: Gold; RMNZ: 2x Platinum	My Beautiful Dark Twisted Fantasy
"Blame Game" (featuring John Legend)	2010	—	—	—	—	—	—	—	—	—	—	RIAA: Gold	My Beautiful Dark Twisted Fantasy
"Hell of a Life"	2010	—	—	—	—	—	—	—	—	—	—	RIAA: Gold	My Beautiful Dark Twisted Fantasy
"Lost in the World" (featuring Bon Iver)	2010	—	—	—	—	—	—	—	—	—	—	RIAA: Gold	My Beautiful Dark Twisted Fantasy
"See Me Now" (featuring Beyoncé, Big Sean and Charlie Wilson)	2010	—	— (Note: "See Me Now" did not enter the Hot R&B/Hip-Hop Songs chart, but peaked at number two on the Bubbling Under R&B/Hip-Hop Singles chart.)	—	—	—	—	—	—	—	—		
"Blazin'" (Nicki Minaj featuring Kanye West)	2010	—	— (Note: "Blazin'" did not enter the Hot R&B/Hip-Hop Songs chart, but peaked at number four on the Bubbling Under R&B/Hip-Hop Singles chart.)	—	—	—	—	—	—	—	—		Pink Friday
"Welcome to the World" (T.I. featuring Kanye West and Kid Cudi)	2010	— (Note: "Welcome to the World" did not enter the Billboard Hot 100, but peaked at number 17 on the Bubbling Under Hot 100 Singles chart.)	—	—	—	—	—	—	—	—	—		No Mercy
"Welcome to the Jungle" (with Jay-Z)	2011	—	— (Note: "Welcome to the Jungle" did not enter the Hot R&B/Hip-Hop Songs chart, but peaked at number four on the Bubbling Under R&B/Hip-Hop Singles chart.)	—	—	—	—	—	—	—	—		Watch the Throne
"Who Gon Stop Me" (with Jay-Z)	2011	44	—	—	—	60	—	—	—	—	—	RIAA: Platinum	Watch the Throne
"Illest Motherfucker Alive" (with Jay-Z)	2011	— (Note: "Illest Motherfucker Alive" did not enter the Billboard Hot 100, but peaked at number four on the Bubbling Under Hot 100 Singles chart.)	—	—	—	—	—	—	—	—	—		Watch the Throne
"To the World" (with R. Kelly and Teyana Taylor)	2012	70	35	24	—	92	161	—	—	94	—		Cruel Summer
"The One" (with Big Sean, 2 Chainz and Marsha Ambrosius)	2012	— (Note: "The One" did not enter the Billboard Hot 100, but peaked at number 11 on the Bubbling Under Hot 100 Singles chart.)	— (Note: "The One" did not enter the Hot R&B/Hip-Hop Songs chart, but peaked at number nine on the Bubbling Under R&B/Hip-Hop Singles chart.)	—	—	—	—	—	—	—	—		Cruel Summer
"Don't Like.1" (with Chief Keef, Pusha T, Big Sean and Jadakiss)	2012	—	—	—	—	—	—	—	—	—	—	RIAA: Platinum	Cruel Summer
"On Sight"	2013	— (Note: "On Sight" did not enter the Billboard Hot 100, but peaked at number ten on the Bubbling Under Hot 100 Singles chart.)	38	—	—	—	—	—	—	—	—	RIAA: Gold	Yeezus
"I Am a God" (featuring God)	2013	— (Note: "I Am a God" did not enter the Billboard Hot 100, but peaked at number nine on the Bubbling Under Hot 100 Singles chart.)	37	—	—	—	—	—	—	—	—	RIAA: Gold	Yeezus
"New Slaves"	2013	56	17	13	—	99	152	—	—	97	—	RIAA: Platinum; BPI: Silver	Yeezus
"Hold My Liquor"	2013	— (Note: "Hold My Liquor" did not enter the Billboard Hot 100, but peaked at number six on the Bubbling Under Hot 100 Singles chart.)	32	—	—	—	—	—	—	—	—	RIAA: Gold	Yeezus
"I'm in It"	2013	— (Note: "I'm in It" did not enter the Billboard Hot 100, but peaked at number 17 on the Bubbling Under Hot 100 Singles chart.)	43	—	—	—	—	—	—	—	—	RIAA: Gold	Yeezus
"Blood on the Leaves"	2013	89	27	21	—	—	131	—	—	174	—	RIAA: Platinum; BPI: Silver; RMNZ: Gold	Yeezus
"Guilt Trip"	2013	—	— (Note: "Guilt Trip" did not enter the Hot R&B/Hip-Hop Songs chart, but peaked at number two on the Bubbling Under R&B/Hip-Hop Singles chart.)	—	—	—	—	—	—	—	—		Yeezus
"Send It Up"	2013	—	50	—	—	—	—	—	—	—	—	RIAA: Gold	Yeezus
"Sanctified" (Rick Ross featuring Kanye West and Big Sean)	2014	78	23	11	—	99	—	—	—	133	—		Mastermind
"Drunk in Love" (Remix) (Beyoncé featuring Jay-Z and Kanye West)	2014	—	— (Note: "Drunk in Love" (Remix) did not enter the Hot R&B/Hip-Hop Songs chart, but peaked at number five on the Bubbling Under R&B/Hip-Hop Singles chart.)	—	—	—	—	—	—	—	—		Beyoncé: Platinum Edition
"All Your Fault" (Big Sean featuring Kanye West)	2015	80	28	18	—	—	—	—	—	—	—	RIAA: Gold	Dark Sky Paradise
"Smuckers" (Tyler, the Creator featuring Kanye West and Lil Wayne)	2015	—	— (Note: "Smuckers" did not enter the Hot R&B/Hip-Hop Songs chart, but peaked at number eight on the Bubbling Under R&B/Hip-Hop Singles chart.)	—	—	—	—	—	—	—	—	RIAA: Gold	Cherry Bomb
"Jukebox Joints" (ASAP Rocky featuring Kanye West and Joe Fox)	2015	—	— (Note: "Jukebox Joints" did not enter the Hot R&B/Hip-Hop Songs chart, but peaked at number seven on the Bubbling Under R&B/Hip-Hop Singles chart.)	—	—	—	—	—	—	—	—	RIAA: Gold; BPI: Silver; RMNZ: Gold	At. Long. Last. ASAP
"Ultralight Beam"	2016	67	22	16	—	88	—	78	— (Note: "Ultralight Beam" did not enter the NZ Top 40 Singles Chart, but peaked at number ten on the NZ Heatseeker Singles Chart.)	63	—	RIAA: 3× Platinum; BPI: Gold; IFPI DEN: Gold; RMNZ: Platinum	The Life of Pablo
"Feedback"	2016	99	36	—	—	—	—	—	—	92	—	RIAA: Platinum	The Life of Pablo
"Low Lights"	2016	— (Note: "Low Lights" did not enter the Billboard Hot 100, but peaked at number 22 on the Bubbling Under Hot 100 Singles chart.)	— (Note: "Low Lights" did not enter the Hot R&B/Hip-Hop Songs chart, but peaked at number one the Bubbling Under R&B/Hip-Hop Singles chart.)	—	—	—	—	—	—	134	—	RIAA: Gold	The Life of Pablo
"Highlights"	2016	— (Note: "Highlights" did not enter the Billboard Hot 100, but peaked at number four on the Bubbling Under Hot 100 Singles chart.)	41	—	—	—	—	—	—	108	—	RIAA: Platinum	The Life of Pablo
"Freestyle 4"	2016	— (Note: "Freestyle 4" did not enter the Billboard Hot 100, but peaked at number nine on the Bubbling Under Hot 100 Singles chart.)	43	—	—	—	—	—	—	132	—	RIAA: Gold	The Life of Pablo
"I Love Kanye"	2016	— (Note: "I Love Kanye" did not enter the Billboard Hot 100, but peaked at number 14 on the Bubbling Under Hot 100 Singles chart.)	48	—	—	—	—	—	—	123	—	RIAA: Gold	The Life of Pablo
"Waves"	2016	71	24	17	—	86	—	95	— (Note: "Waves" did not enter the NZ Top 40 Singles Chart, but peaked at number nine on the NZ Heatseeker Singles Chart.)	77	—	RIAA: 3× Platinum; BPI: Gold; IFPI DEN: Gold; RMNZ: Platinum	The Life of Pablo
"FML"	2016	84	30	22	—	97	—	—	—	84	—	RIAA: Platinum; BPI: Silver; IFPI DEN: Gold; RMNZ: Gold	The Life of Pablo
"Wolves"	2016	— (Note: "Wolves" did not enter the Billboard Hot 100, but peaked at number one on the Bubbling Under Hot 100 Singles chart.)	39	—	—	—	—	—	—	88	—	RIAA: Platinum; BPI: Silver; IFPI DEN: Gold; RMNZ: Gold	The Life of Pablo
"Frank's Track"	2016	—	— (Note: "Frank's Track" did not enter the Hot R&B/Hip-Hop Songs chart, but peaked at number five on the Bubbling Under R&B/Hip-Hop Singles chart.)	—	—	—	—	—	—	168	—	RIAA: Gold	The Life of Pablo
"Facts (Charlie Heat Version)"	2016	—	— (Note: "Facts (Charlie Heat Version)" did not enter the Hot R&B/Hip-Hop Songs chart, but peaked at number four on the Bubbling Under R&B/Hip-Hop Singles chart.)	—	—	—	—	—	—	151	—	RIAA: Gold	The Life of Pablo
"Saint Pablo"	2016	—	—	—	—	—	—	—	—	—	—	RIAA: Platinum; BPI: Silver; RMNZ: Gold	The Life of Pablo
"All We Got" (Chance the Rapper featuring Kanye West and Chicago Children's Choir)	2016	— (Note: "All We Got" did not enter the Billboard Hot 100, but peaked at number two on the Bubbling Under Hot 100 Singles chart.)	45	—	—	—	—	—	—	—	—	RIAA: Platinum; RMNZ: Gold	Coloring Book
"Pussy Print" (Gucci Mane featuring Kanye West)	2016	89	31	25	—	—	—	—	—	—	—		Everybody Looking
"I Thought About Killing You"	2018	28	17	15	41	28	125	34	— (Note: "I Thought About Killing You" did not enter the NZ Top 40 Singles Chart, but peaked at number one on the NZ Heatseeker Singles Chart.)	—	—	RIAA: Gold	Ye
"Wouldn't Leave"	2018	24	14	12	33	24	153	27	21	—	—	RIAA: Gold; RMNZ: Gold	Ye
"No Mistakes"	2018	36	21	19	46	27	195	38	—	—	—	RIAA: Gold	Ye
"Ghost Town"	2018	16	11	—	22	21	146	24	14	17	—	RIAA: 4× Platinum; BPI: Platinum; IFPI DEN: Gold; RMNZ: 2× Platinum	Ye
"Violent Crimes"	2018	27	16	14	40	30	167	33	— (Note: "Violent Crimes" did not enter the NZ Top 40 Singles Chart, but peaked at number two on the NZ Heatseeker Singles Chart.)	—	—	RIAA: 4× Platinum; BPI: Platinum; RMNZ: 2× Platinum; SNEP: Gold	Ye
"Feel the Love" (with Kid Cudi as Kids See Ghosts featuring Pusha T)	2018	47	24	21	57	35	185	50	—	47	—	RIAA: Gold	Kids See Ghosts
"Fire" (with Kid Cudi as Kids See Ghosts)	2018	67	32	—	69	49	—	58	—	—	—	RIAA: Gold	Kids See Ghosts
"4th Dimension" (with Kid Cudi as Kids See Ghosts featuring Louis Prima)	2018	42	21	19	46	27	—	49	— (Note: "4th Dimension" did not enter the NZ Top 40 Singles Chart, but peaked at number one on the NZ Heatseeker Singles Chart.)	46	—	RIAA: Platinum	Kids See Ghosts
"Freeee (Ghost Town, Pt. 2)" (with Kid Cudi as Kids See Ghosts featuring Ty Dolla Sign)	2018	62	30	25	72	58	—	66	—	—	—		Kids See Ghosts
"Reborn" (with Kid Cudi as Kids See Ghosts)	2018	39	18	16	55	30	165	48	— (Note: "Reborn" did not enter the NZ Top 40 Singles Chart, but peaked at number two on the NZ Heatseeker Singles Chart.)	48	—	RIAA: 2× Platinum	Kids See Ghosts
"Kids See Ghosts" (with Kid Cudi as Kids See Ghosts featuring Yasiin Bey)	2018	73	37	—	84	53	—	64	—	—	—	RIAA: Gold	Kids See Ghosts
"Cudi Montage" (with Kid Cudi as Kids See Ghosts)	2018	69	34	—	89	61	—	67	—	—	—	RIAA: Gold	Kids See Ghosts
"Cops Shot the Kid" (Nas featuring Kanye West)	2018	96	49	—	—	—	—	—	—	97	—		Nasir
"Mama" (6ix9ine featuring Kanye West and Nicki Minaj)	2018	43	18	17	22	16	72	80	29	29	—	RIAA: Gold	Dummy Boy
"Kanga" (6ix9ine featuring Kanye West)	2018	— (Note: "Kanga" did not enter the Billboard Hot 100, but peaked at number seven on the Bubbling Under Hot 100 Singles chart.)	— (Note: "Kanga" did not enter the Hot R&B/Hip-Hop Songs chart, but peaked at number one the Bubbling Under R&B/Hip-Hop Singles chart.)	—	—	76	—	—	—	—	—		Dummy Boy
"One Minute" (XXXTentacion featuring Kanye West and Travis Barker)	2018	62	—	23	—	69	—	—	—	—	—		Skins
"Mixed Personalities" (YNW Melly featuring Kanye West)	2019	42	19	17	—	51	—	—	—	100	—	RIAA: 2× Platinum; RMNZ: Platinum	We All Shine
"Every Hour" (featuring Sunday Service Choir)	2019	45	—	—	33	57	131	—	—	—	—	RIAA: Gold	Jesus Is King
"Selah"	2019	19	10	7	18	19	80	21	24	19	—	RIAA: Gold	Jesus Is King
"On God"	2019	23	12	9	21	21	89	—	—	—	—	RIAA: Gold	Jesus Is King
"Everything We Need" (featuring Ty Dolla Sign and Ant Clemons)	2019	33	17	14	26	30	103	—	27	—	—	RIAA: Gold	Jesus Is King
"Water" (featuring Ant Clemons)	2019	51	25	20	37	56	156	—	—	—	—		Jesus Is King
"God Is"	2019	36	—	—	39	40	138	—	—	—	—	RIAA: Platinum; RMNZ: Gold	Jesus Is King
"Hands On" (featuring Fred Hammond)	2019	60	29	24	46	63	178	—	—	—	—		Jesus Is King
"Use This Gospel" (featuring Clipse and Kenny G)	2019	37	20	16	36	34	143	—	—	—	—	RIAA: Gold	Jesus Is King
"Jesus Is Lord"	2019	63	31	—	55	65	—	—	—	—	—		Jesus Is King
"Go2DaMoon" (Playboi Carti featuring Kanye West)	2020	82	30	—	—	86	—	—	4	—	150		Whole Lotta Red
"Tell the Vision" (Pop Smoke featuring Pusha T and Kanye West)	2021	49	16	12	47	19	96	—	—	55	33		Faith and Donda
"Donda Chant"	2021	—	—	—	57	—	—	—	—	—	—		Donda
"Jail"	2021	10	3	3	5	9	57	9	6	11	6	RIAA: Gold; MC: Gold; RMNZ: Gold	Donda
"God Breathed"	2021	30	—	14	20	33	91	—	—	—	28		Donda
"Praise God"	2021	20	10	9	13	17	76	—	—	93	17	RIAA: 2× Platinum; BPI: Silver; MC: Gold; RMNZ: Platinum; SNEP: Gold	Donda
"Jonah"	2021	27	14	12	19	28	99	—	—	—	24	RIAA: Gold	Donda
"Ok Ok"	2021	12	5	5	22	12	116	—	—	—	11		Donda
"Junya"	2021	16	6	6	30	16	132	—	—	—	13		Donda
"24"	2021	43	—	—	29	43	145	—	—	—	40	RIAA: Gold	Donda
"Remote Control"	2021	40	20	16	34	39	151	—	—	—	38	RIAA: Gold	Donda
"Moon"	2021	17	7	7	15	21	103	36	9	83	20	RIAA: Platinum; BPI: Silver; MC: Gold; RMNZ: Platinum	Donda
"Heaven and Hell"	2021	42	21	17	24	37	139	—	—	—	36	RIAA: Gold	Donda
"Donda"	2021	58	—	—	38	48	182	—	—	—	48		Donda
"Keep My Spirit Alive"	2021	59	28	23	41	51	180	—	—	—	51		Donda
"Jesus Lord"	2021	26	13	11	44	26	184	—	—	—	23		Donda
"New Again"	2021	68	32	—	46	57	—	—	—	—	56		Donda
"Tell the Vision"	2021	90	40	—	69	71	—	—	—	—	33		Donda
"Lord I Need You"	2021	70	33	—	54	61	—	—	—	—	58		Donda
"Pure Souls"	2021	52	25	21	37	46	—	—	—	—	14	RIAA: Gold	Donda
"Come to Life"	2021	77	—	—	60	63	—	—	—	—	65		Donda
"No Child Left Behind"	2021	53	—	—	31	42	117	—	—	—	42	RIAA: Gold	Donda
"Jail pt 2"	2021	63	31	—	61	60	—	—	—	—	60		Donda
"Ok Ok pt 2"	2021	—	—	—	76	—	—	—	—	—	—		Donda
"Junya pt 2"	2021	—	—	—	88	—	—	—	—	—	—		Donda
"Jesus Lord pt 2"	2021	—	—	—	94	—	—	—	—	—	—		Donda
"Dreamin of the Past" (Pusha T featuring Kanye West)	2022	81	28	23	—	54	77	—	—	80	128		It's Almost Dry
"Rock n Roll" (Pusha T featuring Kanye West and Kid Cudi)	2022	78	25	20	—	67	—	—	—	98	130		It's Almost Dry
"Use This Gospel (Remix)" (DJ Khaled featuring Kanye West and Eminem)	2022	49	14	13	—	55	—	—	— (Note: "Use This Gospel (Remix)" did not enter the NZ Top 40 Singles Chart, but peaked at number 15 on the NZ Hot Singles Chart.)	—	77		God Did
"Stars" (with Ty Dolla Sign as ¥$)	2024	39	17	12	34	29	—	—	30	—	26		Vultures 1
"Keys to My Life" (with Ty Dolla Sign as ¥$)	2024	55	25	20	59	42	—	—	—	—	48		Vultures 1
"Paid" (with Ty Dolla Sign as ¥$)	2024	53	23	18	44	38	—	—	—	—	42		Vultures 1
"Back to Me" (with Ty Dolla Sign as ¥$)	2024	26	11	8	27	22	—	21	19	18	16		Vultures 1
"Hoodrat" (with Ty Dolla Sign as ¥$)	2024	67	31	25	88	57	—	—	—	—	81		Vultures 1
"Do It" (with Ty Dolla Sign as ¥$)	2024	52	22	17	52	37	—	—	—	—	47		Vultures 1
"Paperwork" (with Ty Dolla Sign as ¥$)	2024	64	29	24	80	53	—	—	—	—	57		Vultures 1
"Burn" (with Ty Dolla Sign as ¥$)	2024	33	14	10	24	19	—	22	13	17	21	BPI: Silver; RMNZ: Gold	Vultures 1
"Fuk Sumn" (with Ty Dolla Sign as ¥$)	2024	23	10	7	33	17	—	—	10	100	13	RMNZ: Gold	Vultures 1
"Beg Forgiveness" (with Ty Dolla Sign as ¥$)	2024	65	30	—	93	54	—	—	—	—	72		Vultures 1
"Good (Don't Die)" (with Ty Dolla Sign as ¥$)	2024	93	43	—	—	76	—	—	—	—	142		Vultures 1
"Problematic" (with Ty Dolla Sign as ¥$)	2024	79	37	—	—	60	—	—	—	—	97		Vultures 1
"King" (with Ty Dolla Sign as ¥$)	2024	94	44	—	—	73	—	—	—	—	154		Vultures 1
"Time Moving Slow" (with Ty Dolla Sign as ¥$ and the Inter Milano Ultras)	2024	— (Note: "Time Moving Slow" did not enter the Billboard Hot 100, but peaked at number 22 on the Bubbling Under Hot 100 chart.)	39	—	—	—	—	—	—	—	—		Vultures 2
"Field Trip" (with Ty Dolla Sign as ¥$, Playboi Carti, and Don Toliver featuring Kodak Black)	2024	48	10	8	88	41	—	—	— (Note: "Field Trip" did not enter the NZ Top 40 Singles Chart, but peaked at number three on the NZ Hot Singles Chart.)	65	33		Vultures 2
"Fried" (with Ty Dolla Sign as ¥$)	2024	87	24	21	—	80	—	—	— (Note: "Fried" did not enter the NZ Top 40 Singles Chart, but peaked at number eight on the NZ Hot Singles Chart.)	—	151		Vultures 2
"Promotion" (with Ty Dolla Sign as ¥$ and Future)	2024	76	21	18	—	73	—	—	— (Note: "Promotion" did not enter the NZ Top 40 Singles Chart, but peaked at number five on the NZ Hot Singles Chart.)	94	138		Vultures 2
"Lifestyle" (with Ty Dolla Sign as ¥$ and Lil Wayne)	2024	—	41	—	—	—	—	—	—	—	—		Vultures 2
"River" (with Ty Dolla Sign as ¥$ and Young Thug)	2024	— (Note: "River" did not enter the Billboard Hot 100, but peaked at number 11 on the Bubbling Under Hot 100 chart.)	32	—	—	—	—	—	—	—	—		Vultures 2
"530" (with Ty Dolla Sign as ¥$)	2024	— (Note: "530" did not enter the Billboard Hot 100, but peaked at number 16 on the Bubbling Under Hot 100 chart.)	37	—	—	—	—	—	—	—	—		Vultures 2
"Dead" (with Ty Dolla Sign as ¥$, Future and Lil Durk)	2024	— (Note: "Dead" did not enter the Billboard Hot 100, but peaked at number 19 on the Bubbling Under Hot 100 chart.)	38	—	—	—	—	—	—	—	—		Vultures 2
"King"	2026	40	11	7	64	42	—	55	— (Note: "King" did not enter the NZ Top 40 Singles Chart, but peaked at number 3 on the NZ Hot Singles Chart.)	47	62		Bully
"This a Must"	2026	51	15	12	—	52	—	—	—	—	78		Bully
"Father" (featuring Travis Scott)	2026	21	6	2	32	25	—	31	33	27	28		Bully
"All the Love" (featuring André Troutman)	2026	27	—	—	33	28	—	30	35	28	31		Bully
"Punch Drunk"	2026	44	13	9	79	43	—	—	—	—	69		Bully
"Whatever Works"	2026	49	14	11	—	48	—	—	—	—	73		Bully
"Mama's Favorite" (featuring Nine Vicious)	2026	59	18	15	—	64	—	—	—	—	105		Bully
"Sisters and Brothers"	2026	67	20	16	—	67	—	—	—	—	126		Bully
"Bully" (featuring CeeLo Green)	2026	61	19	—	—	61	—	—	—	—	106		Bully
"Highs and Lows"	2026	62	—	—	—	54	—	—	—	—	94		Bully
"I Can't Wait" (solo or featuring Ms. Lauryn Hill)	2026	72	21	17	—	71	—	—	— (Note: "I Can't Wait" did not enter the NZ Top 40 Singles chart, but peaked at number 18 on the NZ Hot Singles Chart.)	—	141		Bully
"White Lines" (featuring André Troutman)	2026	82	22	—	—	87	—	—	—	—	196		Bully
"Circles"	2026	87	24	19	—	—	—	—	—	—	—		Bully
"This One Here"	2026	— (Note: "This One Here" did not enter the Billboard Hot 100, but peaked at number three on the Bubbling Under Hot 100 chart.)	32	25	—	—	—	—	— (Note: "This One Here" did not enter the NZ Top 40 Singles Chart, but peaked at number 11 on the NZ Hot Singles Chart.)	—	—		Bully
"OK" (featuring Don Toliver)	2026	— (Note: "OK" did not enter the Billboard Hot 100, but peaked at number four on the Bubbling Under Hot 100 chart.)	32	—	—	—	—	—	— (Note: "OK" did not enter the NZ Top 40 Singles chart, but peaked at number three on the NZ Hot Singles Chart.)	—	—		Bully (Deluxe)
"Mission Control" (featuring the Wrldfms Tony Williams)	2026	—	—	—	—	—	—	—	— (Note: "Mission Control" did not enter the NZ Top 40 Singles chart, but peaked at 24 on the NZ Hot Singles Chart.)	—	—		Bully (Deluxe)
"—" denotes a recording that did not chart or was not released in that territory.

== Guest appearances ==
List of non-single guest appearances, with other performing artists, showing year released and album name
Title	Year	Other artist(s)	Album
"Line for Line"	1996	Grav	Down to Earth
"What You Do to Me"	1999	Infamous Syndicate	Changing the Game
"Let's Get Married" (Reception Remix)	2000	Jagged Edge	Non-album single
"Never Change" {uncredited}	2001	Jay-Z	The Blueprint
"Champions"	2002	Twista, Beanie Sigel, Cam'ron, Young Chris	Paid In Full (soundtrack)
"Guess Who's Back" {uncredited}	2002	Scarface, Jay-Z, Beanie Sigel	The Fix
"Guerilla Monsoon Rap" {uncredited}	2002	Talib Kweli, Black Thought, Pharoahe Monch	Quality
"The Bounce"	2002	Jay-Z	The Blueprint 2: The Gift & The Curse
"Get By" (Remix)	2002	Talib Kweli, Jay-Z, Mos Def, Busta Rhymes	Single
"Changing Lanes"	2003	Chops	Virtuosity
"Oh Oh"	2004	Melbeatz	Rapper's Delight
"Candy"	2004	Myleka, Sharpp	Non-album single
"U Know"	2004	White Boy, John Legend	No Gray Area
"So Soulful"	2004	Consequence	Take 'Em to the Cleaners
"03 'til Infinity"	2004	Consequence	Take 'Em to the Cleaners
"Wack Niggaz"	2004	Consequence	Take 'Em to the Cleaners
"Take It as a Loss"	2004	Consequence	Take 'Em to the Cleaners
"Getting Out the Game"	2004	Consequence	Take 'Em to the Cleaners
"I See Now"	2004	Consequence	Take 'Em to the Cleaners
"Call Some Hoes"	2004	Chamillionaire, Stat Quo	The Mixtape Messiah
"Gettin' It In"	2004	Jadakiss	Kiss of Death
"My Baby"	2004	Janet Jackson	Damita Jo
"It's Alright (Welcome Back Remix)"	2004	Mase	The College Dropout Video Anthology
"Confessions Part II" (Remix)	2004	Usher, Shyne, Twista	"Confessions Part II"
"The Way That You Do"	2004	Carl Thomas	Non-album single
"I Got a Love"	2004	Jin	The Rest Is History
"Hold Me"	2005	Mashonda	January Joy
"Paid the Price"	2005	Do or Die	D.O.D.
"They Say"	2005	Common, John Legend	Be
"Wouldn't You Like to Ride?"	2005	JV, Malik Yusef, Common	Coach Carter (soundtrack)
"Fly Away"	2005	Miri Ben-Ari, Musiq, Fabolous	The Hip-Hop Violinist
"Grown Man, Pt. 2"	2005	Young Gunz, John Legend	Brothers from Another
"We Can Make It Better"	2005	Q-Tip, Common, Rhymefest	Hurricane Relief: Come Together Now
"Side 2 Side" (Extended Remix)	2005	Three 6 Mafia, Project Pat	Most Known Unknown
"Tell Me When to Go" (Remix)	2006	E-40, Ice Cube, The Game	"Tell Me When to Go" single
"More"	2006	Rhymefest	Blue Collar
"Ghetto"	2006	Smitty, John Legend, Scarface	The Voice of the Ghetto
"Anything"	2006	Patti LaBelle, Consequence, Mary Mary	The Gospel According to Patti LaBelle
"Back Like That" (Remix)	2006	Ghostface Killah, Ne-Yo	More Fish
"Like This"	2006	DJ Clue?, Fabolous	The Professional 3
"Still Dreaming"	2006	Nas, Chrisette Michelle	Hip Hop Is Dead
"My Drink n My 2 Step" (Remix)	2007	Cassidy, Ne-Yo, Swizz Beatz	"My Drink n My 2 Step"
"This Ain't a Scene, It's an Arms Race" (Remix)	2007	Fall Out Boy	"This Ain't a Scene, It's an Arms Race"
"The Good, the Bad and the Ugly"	2007	Consequence	Don't Quit Your Day Job!
"Southside"	2007	Common	Finding Forever
"In the Mood"	2007	Talib Kweli, Roy Ayers	Eardrum
"Because of You" (Remix)	2007	Ne-Yo	"Because of You"
"I'ma Get You"	2007	N.O.R.E., GLC	Noreality
"Down"	2007	Chris Brown	Exclusive
"No One" (Curtis Lynch Reggae Mix)	2007	Alicia Keys, Lil' Kim, Damian Marley, Junior Reid, Beenie Man, Barbee	"No One"
"Billie Jean 2008"	2008	Michael Jackson	Thriller 25
"Everyone Nose (All the Girls Standing in the Line for the Bathroom)" (Remix)	2008	N.E.R.D, Lupe Fiasco, Pusha T	Seeing Sounds
"Beat Goes On"	2008	Madonna	Hard Candy
"It's Over"	2008	John Legend	Evolver
"Lollipop" (Remix)	2008	Lil Wayne, Static Major	Tha Carter III
"Promised Land"	2008	Malik Yusef, Adam Levine	G.O.O.D. Morning, G.O.O.D. Night
"Therapy"	2008	T-Pain	Three Ringz
"Digital Girl"	2008	Jamie Foxx, The-Dream	Intuition
"Punch Drunk Love (The Eye)"	2008	Common	Universal Mind Control
"Purrty Woman"	2008	Kidz in the Hall	The Amazin' Race
"Teriya-King"	2009	Teriyaki Boyz, Big Sean	Serious Japanese
"Alright"	2009	Twista	Category F5
"We Fight/We Love" (Remix)	2009	Consequence, Q-Tip	Movies on Demand
"Ego" (Remix)	2009	Beyoncé	Above and Beyoncé: Video Collection & Dance Mixes
"Diamonds"	2009	Teairra Marí	At That Point
"Hate"	2009	Jay-Z	The Blueprint 3
"Anyone but Him"	2009	Mr Hudson	Straight No Chaser
"Alors on Danse" (Remix)	2010	Stromae, Gilbere Forte	Non-album single
"Glenwood"	2010	Big Sean	Finally Famous Vol. 3: Big
"Deuces" (Remix)	2010	Chris Brown, André 3000, T.I., Fabolous, Drake, Rick Ross	Non-album single
"Flight School"	2010	GLC, T-Pain	Love, Life & Loyalty
"Go Hard" (Remix)	2010	DJ Khaled, Jay-Z, T-Pain	The Hits Collection, Volume One
"Blazin'"	2010	Nicki Minaj	Pink Friday
"Welcome to the World"	2010	T.I., Kid Cudi	No Mercy
"Pretty Girl Rock" (Remix)	2010	Keri Hilson	No Boys Allowed
"Touch It"	2011	Pusha T	Fear of God
"Sailing Not Selling"	2011	Jhené Aiko	Sailing Soul(s)
"Eyez Closed"	2011	Snoop Dogg, John Legend	Doggumentary
"To the World"	2012	R. Kelly	Cruel Summer
"The Morning"	2012	Raekwon, Pusha T, Common, 2 Chainz, Cyhi the Prynce, Kid Cudi, D'banj	Cruel Summer
"The One"	2012	Big Sean, 2 Chainz, Marsha Ambrosius	Cruel Summer
"Don't Like.1"	2012	Chief Keef, Pusha T, Big Sean, Jadakiss	Cruel Summer
"White Dress"	2012	none	The Man with the Iron Fists (soundtrack)
"Rollin'"	2012	Game, Trae tha Truth, Z-Ro, Paul Wall, Slim Thug	Non-album single
"Jesus Piece"	2012	The Game, Common	Jesus Piece
"Another You"	2013	King Chip, The World Famous Tony Williams, Freddie Gibbs	44108
"Sanctified"	2014	Rick Ross, Big Sean	Mastermind
"Can't Stop"	2014	Theophilus London	Vibes
"Drunk in Love" (Remix)	2014	Beyoncé, Jay-Z	Beyoncé: Platinum Edition
"All Your Fault"	2015	Big Sean	Dark Sky Paradise
"The Summer League"	2015	Wale, Ty Dolla Sign	Non-album single
"Smuckers"	2015	Tyler, The Creator, Lil Wayne	Cherry Bomb
"Jukebox Joints"	2015	ASAP Rocky, Joe Fox	At. Long. Last. ASAP
"Piss on Your Grave"	2015	Travis Scott	Rodeo
"Mula"	2015	The Game	The Documentary 2
"Guard Down"	2015	Ty Dolla Sign, Diddy	Free TC
"M.P.A."	2015	Pusha T, ASAP Rocky, The-Dream	King Push – Darkest Before Dawn: The Prelude
"All We Got"	2016	Chance the Rapper, Chicago Children's Choir	Coloring Book
"Pussy Print"	2016	Gucci Mane	Everybody Looking
"In Common" (Remix)	2016	Alicia Keys, Travis Scott	Non-album single
"The Killing Season"	2016	A Tribe Called Quest, Talib Kweli, Consequence	We Got It from Here... Thank You 4 Your Service
"Dat Side"	2017	Cyhi the Prynce	No Dope on Sundays
"Cops Shot the Kid"	2018	Nas	Nasir
"Everything"	2018	Nas, The-Dream, 070 Shake, Tony Williams	Nasir
"Hurry"	2018	Teyana Taylor	K.T.S.E.
"Mama"	2018	6ix9ine, Nicki Minaj	Dummy Boy
"Kanga"	2018	6ix9ine	Dummy Boy
"One Minute"	2018	XXXTentacion	Skins
"Mixed Personalities"	2019	YNW Melly	We All Shine
"Puppet"	2019	Tyler, the Creator	Igor
"Feel a Way"	2020	2 Chainz, Brent Faiyaz	So Help Me God!
"Pray 4 Me"	2020	Saint Jhn	While The World Was Burning
"Track 6"	2020	Ty Dolla Sign, Anderson Paak, Thundercat	Featuring Ty Dolla Sign
"Go2DaMoon"	2020	Playboi Carti	Whole Lotta Red
"Tell the Vision"	2021	Pop Smoke, Pusha T	Faith
"The Brenda Song"	2021	Abstract Mindstate	Dreams Still Inspire
"Dreamin of the Past"	2022	Pusha T	It's Almost Dry
"Rock n Roll"	2022	Pusha T, Kid Cudi	It's Almost Dry
"Concussion"	2023	Fivio Foreign	Without Warning
"Israel"	2023	Al Be Back	Dying Near a Charger
"Oxygen"	2023	Sean Leon	In Loving Memory
"Stand United"	2024	French Montana, Saint Jhn, Buju Banton	Mac & Cheese 5
"Where They At"	2024	French Montana, Westside Gunn	Mac & Cheese 5
"Act III: On God? (She Like) [Remix]"	2024	4batz	U Made Me a St4r
"Say Less"	2024	Childish Gambino	—N/a
"No Bad News"	2024	Cordae	The Crossroads
"God's In Control"	2026	Hass	The Second Coming
"40 Nights"	2026	The Game	The Documentary III
"LA Monster"	2026	The Game	The Documentary III

== See also ==
- List of best-selling singles
- List of artists who reached number one in the United States
- List of artists who reached number one on the UK Singles Chart
- Kanye West albums discography
- Kids See Ghosts discography
- List of songs recorded by Kanye West
