= No Face =

No Face may refer to:

- No Face, a character in Hayao Miyazaki's Spirited Away
  - Noppera-bō, the Japanese legendary creature that was its inspiration
- No Face (rap duo)
- No Face (Drake song), 2024 single by Drake
- No Face (Ghostface Killah and Kanye West song), 2024 single by Ghostface Killah featuring Kanye West
