= Stay Up =

Stay Up may refer to:

- "Stay Up" (Baekhyun song), 2019 song by South Korean singer Baekhyun
- "Stay Up" (Dean Brody song), 2020 song by Canadian country artist Dean Brody
- "Stay Up" (Nav song), 2025 song by Canadian rapper Nav
- "Stay Up! (Viagra)", 2008 single by American producer-rapper 88-Keys
