= All We Got =

All We Got may refer to:

- All We Got (Chance the Rapper song), 2016
- All We Got (Robin Schulz song), 2020
- All We Got, a song by Ray Dalton, 2024
