= Bianca Censori =

Australian architect, model, and artist (born 1995)

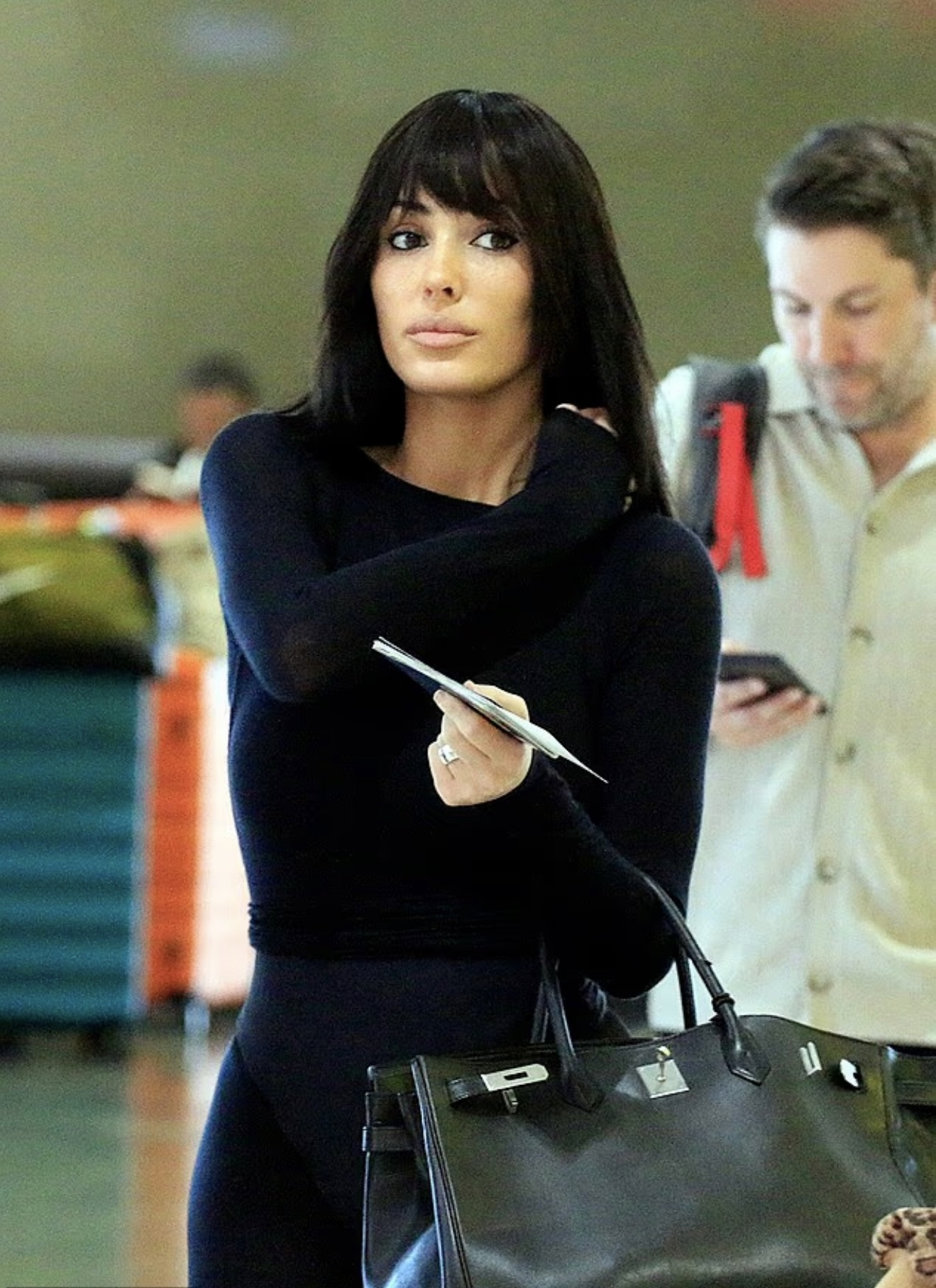
- Censori in 2025
- Born: 5 January 1995 (age 31); Melbourne, Victoria, Australia
- Education: University of Melbourne (BA, MA)
- Known for: Relationship with Kanye West
- Spouse: Kanye West (m. 2022) (Note: West and Censori were reported to have married in a private ceremony in December 2022. Censori has since been referred to as West's wife by media publications, as well as by West himself.)
- Partner: Nick Forgaine (2014–2020)
- Website: biancacensori.com

Bianca Censori (born 5 January 1995) is an Australian performance artist, known for her relationship with American rapper Kanye West, whom she married in a private ceremony in December 2022.

== Early life and education ==
Bianca Censori was born on 5 January 1995 in Melbourne, one of three children born to Alexandra and Elia "Leo" Censori. Her paternal grandparents were natives of Giulianova, Abruzzo, Italy, and emigrated to Australia with their five children.

Censori attended Melbourne's Carey Baptist Grammar School and has a bachelor's and master's degree in architecture from the University of Melbourne. She was a student of architecture at DP Toscano Architects based in Collingwood, Victoria. Censori created the Nylons Jewelry brand after graduating from high school.

In 2007, she met businessman Nick Forgaine, with whom she had a relationship from 2014 to 2020.

== Work ==
According to her LinkedIn profile, Censori is a designer at Yeezy, Kanye West's clothing and apparel company.

Most of Censori's work surrounds her husband, Kanye West. She directed the music video for "Father" featuring Travis Scott, from his album Bully. Both the album and the music video were released on 28 March 2026. Censori is also credited with directing the music videos for West's singles "Gemini Season" as well as "King" and "OK" featuring Don Toliver.

In December 2025, Censori debuted an art show in South Korea which included nude female replicas dressed in bondage, displayed as human furniture.

== Filmography ==
=== Music videos ===
Year	Artist	Song	Director	Actress	Role	Ref.
2026	Kanye West	"Father" (featuring Travis Scott)	Yes	No	—N/a	
2026	Kanye West	"Gemini Season"	Yes	Yes	Herself	
2026	Kanye West	"King"	Yes	No	—N/a	
2026	Kanye West	"OK" (featuring Don Toliver)	Yes	No	—N/a	

== Relationship with Kanye West ==
Censori legally married West in December 2022 under a confidential marriage license, marking Censori's first and West's second marriage. In September 2023, police in Venice were reported to be investigating West and Censori over "acts contrary to public decency" after the couple posted photos of themselves on a water taxi with West's pants pulled down and buttocks exposed, and Censori's head in his lap. Censori appears on the album cover of Vultures 1 (2024), the debut album of ¥$, a hip-hop superduo consisting of West and American singer Ty Dolla Sign.

At the 2025 Grammy Awards, Censori and West caused controversy on the red carpet when Censori appeared wearing a sheer, transparent slip revealing her fully naked body. West, dressed entirely in black, did not address the spectacle before the two left the event shortly after. Reports surfaced that they had been removed from the ceremony, though sources close to the Grammys denied that, stating that West had simply left after walking the red carpet. In February 2025, reports began to emerge that Censori was intending to divorce West after his recent antisemitic tirades. However, Milo Yiannopoulos (West's spokesperson) denied those reports, dismissing them as rumors. Shortly after, reports emerged that the couple had married without signing a prenuptial agreement. The same month, reports surfaced that West and Censori had separated after two years of marriage. Media outlets cited sources suggesting that Censori had become uncomfortable with aspects of West's public behavior and controversies. However, a representative for the couple denied the split rumours, stating that they planned to spend Valentine's Day together.

In April 2025, West previewed a song on a livestream with DJ Akademiks called "Bianca", where he begs her to come back, possibly meaning that they had split up sometime in March. On his stream, West said that Censori had to "take time to digest the tweets," suggesting that they were not together at that point. However, the next month the couple were seen in public in the Spanish town of Santanyí. In the same month she also launched jewelry inspired by medical instruments such as speculums.
