= Cops Shot the Kid =

2018 single by Nas featuring Kanye West

Single by Nas featuring Kanye West

from the album Nasir
- Released: June 15, 2018
- Recorded: 2018
- Studio: West's ranch in Jackson Hole, Wyoming
- Genre: East Coast hip hop; hip hop; progressive rap
- Length: 2:47
- Label: Mass Appeal; Def Jam
- Songwriters: Nasir Jones; Ricky Walters; Richard Pryor; Kanye West; Andrew Dawson; Che Smith
- Producer: Kanye West

Music video
- "Cops Shot the Kid" on YouTube

"Cops Shot the Kid" is a song by American rapper Nas featuring fellow rapper Kanye West from the former's eleventh studio album, Nasir (2018). The track was written by Nas, West, Andrew Dawson, and Che Smith, with West handling production and Dawson providing additional production. The song samples "Children's Story" by Slick Rick throughout, and includes dialogue spoken by Richard Pryor from the film Wattstax (1974); both are also credited as writers.

== Background ==
Nas took to Instagram shortly after the song had generated attention as a standout from the album and paid homage to Slick Rick, since he's sampled and behind the inspiration for it.

In October 2020, a snippet of the original version of the song featuring an unreleased guest verse from André 3000 surfaced online.

== Composition ==
For the background vocals saying: "The cops shot the kid" throughout the vast majority of "Cops Shot the Kid", a sample from "Children's Story" by Slick Rick is used. The speech in the track's intro is sampled from a scene including Richard Pryor in 1973 Stax Records film Wattstax.

== Critical reception ==
The song received mostly positive reviews. NME described it as a "Track full of evocative images", and labelled the Slick Rick sample as being both "breathless" and "frantic". Rolling Stone viewed "Cops Shot the Kid" as being the album's "most cogent song" and branded West's appearance as a "lone guest verse".

== Commercial performance ==
Upon the release of Nasir, the track debuted at number 96 on the US Billboard Hot 100. This made it the only song from the album to enter that chart.

== Charts ==
Chart (2018)	Peak position
UK Singles (Official Charts)	97
US Billboard Hot 100	96
US Hot R&B/Hip-Hop Songs (Billboard)	49
