= The Death of Adam =

Studio album by 88-Keys
- Released: November 11, 2008
- Recorded: 2006–2008
- Genre: Hip-hop
- Label: Decon
- Producers: 88-Keys; Kanye West (also co-exec.)

88-Keys albums chronology
Adam's Case Files Mixtape (2008)	The Death of Adam (2008)

Singles from The Death of Adam
- 1. "Stay Up! (Viagra)" Released: August 25, 2008

Professional ratings
Review scores
Source	Rating
Allmusic	4/5 stars
DJBooth.net	3.5/5 stars
HipHopDX.com	4/5 stars
Vibe	(positive)
Spin	3/5 stars
NY Daily News	3/5 stars
RapReviews.com	7.5/10 stars

The Death of Adam is the debut studio album by American hip-hop producer and rapper 88-Keys. Released on November 11, 2008, the album features guest appearances by Kanye West, Kid Cudi, J*Davey, Redman, Bilal, Phonte of Little Brother, and alternative rock group Shitake Monkey.

== Concept ==
The album tells the story of an investigation surrounding the death of a man named Adam who was murdered in his Harlem loft apartment. During a recent interview in regards to the album's concept 88' stated:

The entire album is about the power of the punani, if you will. The album follows the story line of my man Adam who passed away and basically how he died. It all started off with him catching a boner one morning, morning wood, and his life starts to spin out of control from there.

The story is told instrumentally, while the featured artists help get the story across. 88' has described that his inspiration for the project derived from the thought, "What gives me pleasure?"

I thought, “What gives me pleasure?” So I thought, Polo clothes, blue label of course, give me pleasure, when I’m out coppin’. Making beats bring me pleasure. Money. I’m like, “Boom! I know what gives me pleasure! Pussy!” So as soon as that thought came into my head, I’m like, “Okay. I’m scrapping all the other beats I had made for my album so far, and I’m starting with this one. This is the first beat for my album.” And I just stayed on it.

Aside from tracks, the album's investigative story is told through visual means, particularly DCN 27 News pieces that were distributed on multiple video-sharing sites. In the faux news bulletins, local news reporter Chip Adams interviews various artists who apparently knew Adam to a certain extent and provide their feedback on his death. The viral series includes cameos by Q-Tip, Consequence, Kid Cudi and Shitake Monkey.

The album's lead single, "Stay Up! (Viagra)", features 88's executive producer of the project, Kanye West:

I really didn’t approach him at all. Him and I, we’re best friends, so he’s kinda been there almost every step of the way. So just me playing him the album, he was diggin’ it a lot. He liked it a lot. He definitely brought something to the table as far as the story line is concerned. He actually helped me rewrite the story, trim the fat off the album and then he gave the story a brand new twist ending that was so genius.

== Track listing ==
#	Title	Guest Performer(s)	Composer(s)	Time
1	"Morning Wood"		M. Bell; C. Njapa; P. Wade	4:04
2	"Nice Guys Finish Last"		E. Townsend; C. Njapa	2:12
3	"The Friends Zone"	Shitake Monkey	C. Shreve; M. Mothersbaugh; J. Hill; C. Njapa; R. Mothersbaugh; P. Wade	4:04
4	"Handcuff 'Em"		T. Davis; C. Njapa; B. White	2:54
5	"Stay Up! (Viagra)"	Kanye West	K. West; C. Njapa	3:11
6	"There's Pleasure in It"		C. Njapa; J. Ferguson	1:31
7	"(Awww Man) Round 2?"		C. Njapa; S. Payne	2:39
8	"Dirty Peaches"	J*DaVeY	P. McCartney; L. McCartney; B. Cartwright	4:27
9	"Close Call"	Phonte of Little Brother	J. Weatherly	3:56
10	"The Burning Bush"	Redman	R. Noble; C. Njapa; N. Whitfield	3:49
11	"Ho' Is Short for Honey"	Kid Cudi	P. McCartney; L. McCartney	3:04
12	"No. I Said I LIKED You"		C. Njapa	1:45
13	"M.I.L.F."	Bilal	C. Njapa; S. Stewart; B. Oliver	3:49
14	"Another Victim"		H. Hinsley; C. Njapa; T. Connors; P. Olive	2:22

== Samples ==
- "Nice Guys Finish Last"
  - "It's Too Late to Be Nice to Her Now" by Townsend, Townsend, Townsend and Rogers
- "Stay Up! (Viagra)"
  - "All Night Loving" by Imagination (band)
- "(Awww Man) Round 2?"
  - "Now Is the Time to Say Goodbye" by Freda Payne
- " Dirty Peaches"
  - "The Note You Never Wrote" by Wings
- " Burning Bush"
  - "Fire" by Temptations
- " Ho Is Short For Honey"
  - "Mrs Vandebilt" by Wings
- "M.I.L.F."
  - "Mother Beautiful" by Sly & the Family Stone
- "Another Victim"
  - "Lovin You Just Ain't The Same" by Tony Wilson

== Hardware assembly ==
- Akai MPC3000 (sampling workstation)
- AKG C 414B-ULS (microphone)
- Rhodes Jazz Bass (keyboard)
- Yamaha Motif 6 (keyboard)
- Numark DM1180 (mixer)
- Roland VS-2480 (digital studio workstation)
- Samson Servo 150 (amplifier)
- Tascam CD-RW700 (CD burner)
- Technics SL-1200MK2 (turntable)
- SB-A26 (3-way cabinet speakers)
