= Nasir (album) =

2018 studio album by Nas

Studio album by Nas
- Released: June 15, 2018
- Recorded: June 2018
- Studio: West Lake Ranch (Jackson Hole, Wyoming)
- Genres: Hip hop; progressive rap
- Length: 26:29
- Labels: Mass Appeal; Def Jam
- Producer: Kanye West

Nas chronology
Life Is Good (2012)	Nasir (2018)	The Lost Tapes 2 (2019)

Nasir (stylized in all caps) is the eleventh studio album by American rapper Nas, released on June 15, 2018, through Mass Appeal Records and Def Jam Recordings. It marked his first album in six years since Life Is Good (2012). The album features guest appearances from Kanye West, Puff Daddy, 070 Shake, Tony Williams, and The-Dream. West also served as the album's executive producer, with additional production from Mike Dean, Andrew Dawson, Dot da Genius, and Cashmere Cat, among others.

Nasir is the fourth out of five seven-track albums Kanye West produced in what has become known as the "Wyoming Sessions", with each album being released weekly. It follows the release of Pusha T's Daytona, West's Ye, and West's collaboration with Kid Cudi entitled Kids See Ghosts, and precedes the release of Teyana Taylor's K.T.S.E.. Nasir rose to No. 5 on the Billboard 200 and No. 16 on the UK Albums chart.

== Background ==
American musician DJ Khaled's 2016 album Major Key featured a track titled "Nas Album Done" with Nas which announced the completion of his album. The same year, Kanye West expressed his wish to produce an album by Nas, seemingly promising Barack Obama that he would achieve this.

In May 2017, Nas' brother, Jungle, made a post on Instagram in a recording studio with the hashtag #NasAlbumAlmostDone.

== Release and promotion ==
In April 2018, Kanye West announced that he was producing Nas' new album with a release date of June 15, 2018. West later released an incomplete track listing of the five albums he was working on, revealing the Nas track "Everything". On June 12, West revealed a full tentative tracklist for the album, while the album title and cover art was revealed on June 14, a day before release.

A listening party for the album took place on June 14, 2018, in Queensbridge, New York City and was streamed via Mass Appeal's YouTube channel.

== Critical reception ==
Professional ratings
Aggregate scores
Source	Rating
AnyDecentMusic?	5.8/10
Metacritic	58/100
Review scores
Source	Rating
AllMusic	2.5/5 stars
The A.V. Club	B−
Exclaim!	5/10
The Guardian	3/5 stars
Mojo	2/5 stars
MusicOMH	4/5 stars
NME	3/5 stars
Pitchfork	6.1/10
Rolling Stone	2.5/5 stars
XXL	4/5

Nasir was met with generally mixed reviews from critics. At Metacritic, which assigns a normalized rating out of 100 from mainstream publications, the album received an average score of 58, based on 16 reviews.

For The A.V. Club, Colin McGowan praised Kanye West's "lavishly triumphant production" on songs such as "White Label" and Nas' political awareness on "Cops Shot the Kid" but observed filler in the "empty empowerment" of "Everything" and the "late-90s jiggy rap" of "Bonjour"; he concluded that Nasir was a less-than-definitive experiment for the rapper. Elizabeth Aubrey of NME wrote: "Whilst stylistically Nasir may well have plenty of strong moments, its contradictions make it a difficult, problematic listen: it's the silences on here which so often deafen." She praised West's production and the album's brevity, as well as Nas' lyrical maturity and social awareness, however noted that the political beliefs shared sometimes "ring hollow", being at odds with views shared by West. She also believed the rapper's male gaze of women conflicted with the album's underlying theme of equality, while failing to address allegations of abuse by Nas' ex-wife Kelis: "It's a deeply troubling conflict on an album that manages to be so successfully woke on one level and yet so blatantly archaic on another".

Alexis Petridis of The Guardian praised West's production and Nas' tackling of social justice issues but also criticised Nas for not addressing domestic violence allegations, as well as for the "mercurial" nature of his lyrics stating "[Nas'] rhymes shifting from acute, powerful indictments of racism to stuff that makes no sense, or seems to be there purely for the purposes of provocation" and describing some of the themes as "conspiracy theories". In a review for Rolling Stone, Paul Thompson described the album as "a frustrating listen, with glimpses of greatness". He wrote that "Nasir is among the weakest Nas albums, but there's nothing spectacular about its failure", describing it as "unfocused and unclear", however noted that "there are interesting flashes elsewhere on the album", praising "Everything" and "Adam and Eve", as well as describing "Cops Shot the Kid" as "cogent". Online hip hop publication HipHopDX described the album as "imperfect fine art", concluding that "When you factor in all its dexterity, randomness and overall generality, it's hard to truly believe Nasir was the album he had been cerebrally building these past six years." Robert Christgau gave the album a one-star honorable mention in his capsule-review column for Vice, singling out "Cops Shot the Kid" and "Everything" as highlights while crediting Nas for "bringing the knowledge, mixing in the sophistry, and dropping a laugh line he knows the boss [West] can't top: 'Everybody's saying my humility's infectious,' what a card".

While reflecting on the album, Nas expressed confusion as to why the album did not resonate with audiences and critics. "I don't know what went wrong," Nas began. "I like "Cops Shot the Kid', I like 'Adam and Eve'. I like the music in 'Simple Things'. It's a short album. We just didn't get enough time. I wish we'd worked on it more."

== Commercial performance ==
Nasir debuted at number five on the US Billboard 200 with 77,000 album-equivalent units, of which 49,000 were pure album sales. It serves as Nas's twelfth top-ten album in the United States. The album dropped to the number 36 in its second week, earning an additional 14,000 album-equivalent units.

== Track listing ==
- Credits are adapted from the CD version.

No.	Title	Writer(s)	Producer(s)	Length
1.	"Not for Radio" (featuring Puff Daddy and 070 Shake)	Nasir Jones; Basil Poledouris; Kanye West; Mike Dean; Magnus August Høiberg; Benjamin Levin; Oladipo Omishore; Sean Combs; Terius Nash	West; Dean^{[a]}; Dot da Genius^{[a]}; Benny Blanco^{[a]}; Cashmere Cat^{[a]}	3:22
2.	"Cops Shot the Kid" (featuring Kanye West)	Jones; Ricky Walters; Richard Pryor; West; Andrew Dawson; Che Smith	West; Dawson^{[a]}	2:47
3.	"White Label"	Jones; West; Dean	West; Dean^{[b]}; BoogzDaBeast^{[b]}	2:58
4.	"Bonjour" (featuring Tony Williams)	Jones; R. D. Burman; West; Dean; Omishore; Tony Williams; Che Pope	West; Pope^{[a]}; Dot da Genius^{[a]}; Dean^{[b]}; Eric Danchick^{[b]}	3:21
5.	"Everything" (featuring The-Dream and Kanye West)	Jones; West; Dean; Nash; Levin; Caroline Shaw; Høiberg; Patrick Reynolds; Adrian Owusu; Jake Ferguson; Malcolm Catto	West; Dean^{[a]}; Blanco^{[a]}; Cashmere Cat^{[a]}; Plain Pat^{[b]}	7:32
6.	"Adam and Eve" (featuring The-Dream)	Jones; West; Dean; Kourosh Yaghmaei; Nash; Pope	West; Dean^{[b]}; Plain Pat^{[b]}; Evan Mast^{[b]}	4:10
7.	"Simple Things"	Jones; West; Dean; Justin Vernon	West; Dean^{[a]}	2:19
Total length:				26:29

Notes

- ^{^[a]} signifies a co-producer
- ^{^[b]} signifies an additional producer
- "White Label" features uncredited vocals by Mano.

Samples

- "Not for Radio" contains samples of "Hymn to Red October (Main Title)" from The Hunt for Red October, spoken by Basil Poledouris.
- "Cops Shot the Kid" contains samples of "Children's Story", performed by Slick Rick, and dialogue from Wattstax, spoken by Richard Pryor.
- "Bonjour" contains samples of "Dance Music" from Mukti, performed by R. D. Burman, and dialogue from Paid in Full, spoken by Dame Dash.
- "Everything" contains samples of "Space Time Girl", written by Adrian Owusu, Jake Ferguson and Malcolm Catto, as performed by The Heliocentrics.
- "Adam and Eve" contains samples of "Gole Yakh", performed by Kourosh Yaghmaei, dialogue from The Godfather Part II, spoken by Al Pacino.
- "White Label" contains samples of "Prison Song", performed by Shahram Shabpareh.

== Personnel ==
=== Musicians ===
- Phillip Peterson – cello, string arrangement (tracks 1, 4)
- Victoria Parker – violin (tracks 1, 4)
- Plain Pat – drums (tracks 5, 6)

=== Technical ===
- Zack Djurich – engineering
- Sean Solymar – engineering
- Juan "AyoJuan" Pena – engineering (track 1)
- Mike Malchicoff – engineering (track 4)
- Mike Dean – mixing (tracks 1, 3, 5)
- Jess Jackson – mixing (tracks 1, 3, 5)
- Andrew Dawson – mixing (tracks 2, 4, 6, 7)
- BoogzDaBeast – programming (track 1)
- Ryan Hendrickson – engineering (tracks 1, 4)

== Charts ==
=== Weekly charts ===
Chart (2018)	Peak position
Australian Albums (ARIA)	54
Austrian Albums (Ö3 Austria)	49
Belgian Albums (Ultratop Flanders)	27
Belgian Albums (Ultratop Wallonia)	80
Danish Albums (Hitlisten)	19
Dutch Albums (Album Top 100)	13
Finnish Albums (Suomen virallinen lista)	44
French Albums (SNEP)	173
German Albums (Offizielle Top 100)	59
Irish Albums (IRMA)	24
Italian Albums (FIMI)	95
Japanese Albums (Oricon)	169
New Zealand Albums (RMNZ)	15
Norwegian Albums (VG-lista)	16
Scottish Albums (Official Charts)	60
Swedish Albums (Sverigetopplistan)	29
Swiss Albums (Schweizer Hitparade)	12
UK Albums (Official Charts)	16
UK R&B Albums (Official Charts)	3
US Billboard 200	5
US Top R&B/Hip-Hop Albums (Billboard)	4

=== Year-end charts ===
Chart (2018)	Position
US Top R&B/Hip-Hop Albums (Billboard)	98
