= Welcome to the World (T.I. song) =

Song by T.I. featuring Kanye West and Kid Cudi

from the album No Mercy
- Recorded: 2010
- Genre: Hip hop
- Length: 4:14
- Label: Grand Hustle; Atlantic
- Songwriter(s): Kanye West; Clifford Harris; Scott Mescudi
- Producer(s): Kanye West

"Welcome to the World" is a song by American rapper T.I. featuring fellow American rappers Kid Cudi and Kanye West. Produced by the latter, it is the first track from the former's seventh studio album No Mercy (2010).

== Background ==
The track leaked online on November 22, 2010, within the same week that West's fifth studio album My Beautiful Dark Twisted Fantasy was released. T.I. was being held in a federal prison at the time of this leak. In his appearance, West addresses the conspiracy theory of him being an Illuminati member when rapping: "People ask me shit about the Illuminati/First off, fuck that mean?/He loved Jesus when he was worse off, oh I see/When they think a nigga is stupid rich/People just start coming up with stupid shit".

== Critical reception ==
HipHopDX received the song negatively, describing it as being: 'not nearly as cordial an introduction as the title suggests, as T.I. and Kanye West sound like they're having a terrible day, and the listener is responsible and must bear the brunt of their respective wrath'. However, USA Today had a more positive reception towards "Welcome to the World", describing it as a track that: 'opens the album with T.I.'s characteristic swagger'.

When Complex listed the best collaborations between West and Cudi in August 2017, the song was positioned at number nine.

== Commercial performance ==
Upon the release of the featuring album, "Welcome to the World" peaked at number 17 on the US Billboard Bubbling Under Hot 100.

== Charts ==
Chart (2010)	Peak position
US Bubbling Under Hot 100 Singles (Billboard)	17
