= 88-Keys =

American musical artist (born 1976)

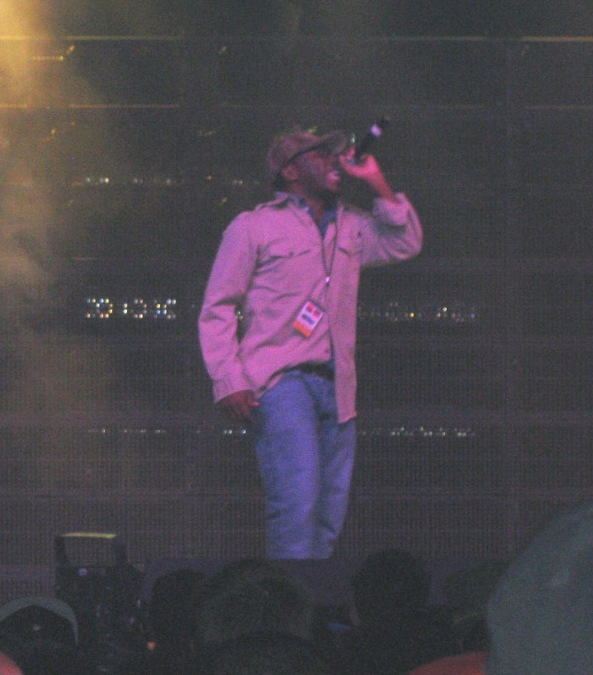
- 88-Keys performing live in 2009

Background information
- Born: Charles Misodi Njapa; March 5, 1976 (age 50); New York City, U.S.
- Genre: Hip hop
- Occupations: Record producer; rapper; songwriter; musician
- Years active: 1998–present
- Labels: GOOD; Decon; Locksmith; Warner
- Website: www.myspace.com/88keys

Charles Misodi Njapa (born March 5, 1976), known professionally as 88-Keys, is an American record producer and rapper.

== Biography ==
Born in New York City to West African parents from Cameroon, 88-Keys was raised in Edenwald, Eastchester, in the Bronx, and then West Hempstead on Long Island, where he attended high school.

88-Keys first took an interest in hip hop music after hearing Prince Paul's production on De La Soul's 1989 critically acclaimed album 3 Feet High and Rising. In the early 1990s, 88-Keys met rapper-producers Large Professor, Pete Rock, and the musician Q-Tip, while working as an intern at West Hempstead's The Music Palace recording studio. It was Large Professor who gave Charles his 88-Keys moniker after witnessing his skills on the Ensoniq ASR-10 keyboard.

Upon considering a serious career in music, 88-Keys' parents and older brother attempted to encourage him to study the field of medicine, since it was a more "professional field", and the music industry did not seem like a lucrative move. After briefly attending Hofstra University and Queens College, 88-Keys dropped out to pursue his dreams of being a record producer. His decision was fueled by an opportunity to record tracks with The Pharcyde, who were recording in California.

In addition to his passion for music, 88-Keys has expressed his love for fashion, most notably Ralph Lauren. In a 2008 interview with Metro International, 88-Keys revealed that he had worn Polo Ralph Lauren every day for 16 years.

I try to stay true to Ralph's vision. I don't want to bastardize his vision – no offense to the urban community – because we all know what happened to Tommy Hilfiger once the hip hop community embraced it. I'll walk out of the door dressed in loafers when everyone else is wearing Timberland boots. I definitely stand out. I'll tag along with Kanye on shopping trips and look at clothing by designers whose names I'd need to take French lessons to pronounce. He'll ask me what I think and I'll be like, whatever. I've turned down paying gigs because they've tried to dress me in clothing by other designers. Besides record shopping, the only other place I need is a Polo store. I'll go to Paris and they ll be like, 'here's the Eiffel Tower' and I'm like, 'whatever, where's the record store and the Polo store.

According to the article, 88-Keys began wearing Polo Ralph Lauren as a Long Island high school student in 1992, when he developed a liking for its classic, preppy style. As of 2008, his wardrobe included over 700 Polo pieces.

Since his days as an assistant engineer, 88-Keys has produced records for numerous artists, including Mos Def, Talib Kweli, Kid Cudi, Macy Gray, Musiq Soulchild, Dejuan Lucian, and rapper Consequence. Recently, 88-Keys extended beyond his production credits as an MC, singer and collaborator, most notably on his solo debut album The Death of Adam, released on November 11, 2008. Executively produced by 88-Keys's close friend Kanye West, the concept album tells the story of a man named Adam, who has been murdered in a loft apartment in Harlem. In August 2008, a fifteen-track mixtape titled Adam's Case Files was released as a prequel to The Death of Adam. The album's first single, titled "Stay Up! (Viagra)", was officially released through iTunes on September 9, 2008. In December 2008, 88-Keys was featured as Spin Artist of the Day. In 2009, 88-Keys worked in Atlanta with new female duo Addictive on a track for an upcoming album.

In June 2019, 88-Keys announced that a song he produced entitled "That's Life", featuring Sia and Mac Miller, had been approved for release by Miller's estate; it was released through Warner Records on June 20, 2019.

== Discography ==
- Adam's Case Files Mixtape (2008)
- Stay Up! (Viagra) Prescription Pack – EP (2008)
- The Death of Adam (2008)
