= OK (Kanye West song) =

Song by Kanye West featuring Don Toliver

from the album Bully - Deluxe
- Released: June 19, 2026
- Recorded: March–April 2026
- Genre: Hip-hop
- Length: 2:38
- Label: YZY; Gamma
- Songwriters: Ye; Don Toliver; Quentin Miller
- Producer: Ye

Music video
- "OK" on YouTube

"OK" is a song by American rapper Kanye West featuring fellow American rapper and singer Don Toliver from the deluxe edition of the former's twelfth studio album, Bully (2026). It was released on June 19, 2026, through YZY and Gamma, as one of two songs added to the original album. The track was previewed in April 2026 before being performed live. A music video directed by Bianca Censori was released in August. The video was noted for its distinctive visuals following West through surgery in an operating room.

== Background ==
"OK" was first previewed at an after-party of West's second of two shows at SoFi Stadium in April 2026. The preview came along with confirmation of the deluxe edition of Bully via an Instagram post from Gamma. Days later, on June 8, West released the single "Gemini Season." The track's accompanying music video confirmed the release date of the deluxe edition of Bully in its YouTube description.

== Release and promotion ==
The track was released on June 19, 2026, as one of two new songs included on the deluxe edition of Bully. Following the track's release, Don Toliver teased visuals for the song on his social media. Toliver also performed it live at his Octane Tour. According to Billboard, "Toliver had been working it into his tour’s setlist as well."

== Composition and lyrics ==
According to HotNewHipHop, the song features "ethereal production" incorporating West's recognizable sampling alongside Toliver's "penchant for melody and entrancing flows." Bass licks, chimes, synths, and drum kicks create an earthy sound for the track. Toliver's verse uses an intense delivery while the hook, described as "choppy" and "stuttery," repeats over a minimalist, melodic instrumental. This builds up to distorted 808 kicks that transition into a beat drop. West's flows on the song were noted to be similar to his feature on "Put On" by Jeezy.

== Music video ==
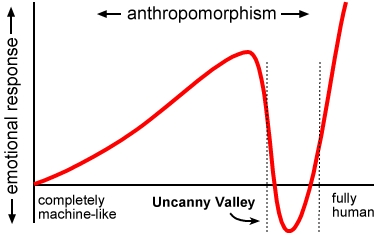
HotNewHipHop compared Toliver and West's staring in the music video to the uncanny valley.

On August 17, 2026, the music video for "OK" was released on Instagram. Directed by West's wife, Bianca Censori, it marks her fourth directorial release alongside "Father," "Gemini Season," and "King". An absurdist video, it takes place in an operating room with doctors treating a decapitated West. As Toliver's verse begins, he appears from a locker, reattaching West's body and bringing him back to life. West then sharpens a sword, as Toliver's shadow is seen amid a battle off to the side. The video closes with the rappers staring at the camera.

Hypebeast emphasized Censori's visual storytelling revolving around "gesture, setting, and composed imagery" rather than traditional narratives. Alexander Cole of HotNewHipHop noted an uncanny valley-like look when West and Toliver remained to stare at the camera for a prolonged period of time. Cole further noted the artificial facial features used.

On August 27, Censori shared behind-the-scenes photos from the video shoot on her Instagram. A prop of West's head and costumes were previewed.

== Charts ==
Charts (2026)	Peak Position
Costa Rica Anglo Airplay (Monitor Latino)	11
New Zealand Hot Singles (RMNZ)	3
US Bubbling Under Hot 100 (Billboard)	4
US Hot R&B/Hip-Hop Songs (Billboard)	32

== Credits and personnel ==
Credits adapted from Tidal.

- Ye – vocals, writing, production, programming, vocal production
- Don Toliver – vocals, writing, vocal production
- Quentin Miller – writing
