= Gemini Season =

2026 single by Kanye West

Single by Kanye West
- Released: June 8, 2026
- Genre: Drumless hip-hop
- Length: 1:47 (single version); 1:32 (video version)
- Label: YZY; Gamma
- Songwriters: Ye; Ashon Travis; Caleb Toliver
- Producer: Ye

Kanye West singles chronology
"Alive" (2025)	"Gemini Season" (2026)

Music video
- "Gemini Season" on YouTube

"Gemini Season" (stylized in all caps) is a song by American rapper Kanye West. It was surprise released as a single for West's birthday on June 8, 2026, along with an accompanying music video through YZY and Gamma. Solely produced by West and written with Ashton Travis and Don Toliver, it features a minimalist instrumental with horn and wind instruments that West sings erotic lyrics over.

"Gemini Season" received generally positive reviews from critics, though was seen more negatively by West's fanbase for its sexual themes. The accompanying music video was directed by West's partner Bianca Censori, featuring her milking a cow before West proceeds to pour the milk on her. It sparked reactions from reviewers and music critics for its erotic imagery, with most praising the video's use of surrealism, although West's fanbase often criticized its sexual nature.

== Background and promotion ==
Before his second concert in Arnhem, Netherlands on June 8, West's partner Bianca Censori celebrated his birthday, posting videos and photos of him on social media captioned "Happy birthday @ye / I love you more than life." After the concert, a music video for a song titled "Gemini Season" appeared on West's YouTube account and was set to release in the same hour. The video's description confirmed that a deluxe version of Bully would release on June 19.

West had previously used the phrase "Gemini season" after rapper Kendrick Lamar won five Grammys for his song "Not Like Us" during the 67th Annual Grammy Awards in 2025, sharing a picture of Lamar with his Grammys on Instagram with the caption "Gemini season", attaching a goat emoji. Both West and Lamar share the same zodiac sign, Gemini, which the song title and caption references.

== Composition and lyrics ==
"Gemini Season"
The song features horn and wind instrumentation. West half-sings in the chorus, and transitions to a verse with sexually explicit lyrics and pitched-down vocals.

"Gemini Season" is a short song centered around themes of sexual desire and eroticism. West sings over a minimalist, drumless instrumental built around horn and wind instruments, half-singing "I wanna get kinky / I think she'll let me / I think she's pretty / I think she's ready." In the song's other half, he counts his "hoes" in Spanish and mentions having his window closed with an air conditioner on, asking a woman if she is "cold" while noting her hardened nipples.

== Music video ==
On June 8, 2026, "Gemini Season", along with the music video was released on YouTube, which was directed by West's partner Bianca Censori. Before its release, Censori had previously directed West's music video for his song "Father" featuring Travis Scott, which was her debut. She later directed the music video for West's songs "King" and "OK".

The video shows Censori on a barstool in all-white lingerie, milking a cow for the majority of its duration. Near the end of the video, West enters wearing a monochrome leather outfit from 424 Inc. by designer Guillermo Andrade. After Censori offers the milk to West, he suggestively pours it on her face and down her torso, referencing a similar scene from the 1992 Roman Polanski film Bitter Moon. The video is set in a mountainous scenery with fake moving clouds, reminiscent of the music video for West's song "Bound 2" from his album Yeezus (2013).

=== Reactions ===
Despite positive responses from critics, West's fans (pictured) generally viewed the music video more negatively due to its sexual nature.

Mike Winslow of AllHipHop praised the music video as "[utterly] unhinged in the best way", while HotNewHipHop's Erika Marie noted the video as "surreal" and "pretty on par" for the way Censori and West approach art. Samridhi Goel of Mandatory described the milk pouring scene as "the video’s most talked-about moment," writing that it contributed to many social media conversations. Described as "highly provocative," Whoopsee stated the video invited the audience to search for its allegories and further interpretation.

Daily Jang writer Sidra Khan reported on negative reactions from West's fanbase, who criticized the video's sexual nature. Generally, the video received mixed-to-negative reactions from West's fans, especially as West had previously spoken against the sexual imagery it portrays. Fans widely regard the video as 'freaky,' though some compared its style to West's earlier works.

== Credits and personnel ==
Credits adapted from Tidal.

- Ye – vocals, songwriter, producer
- Ashton Travis – songwriter
- Don Toliver – songwriter
