= One Minute (XXXTentacion song) =

2018 song by XXXTentacion featuring Kanye West & Travis Barker

Song by XXXTentacion featuring Kanye West and Travis Barker

from the album Skins
- Released: December 7, 2018
- Recorded: 2018
- Studio: XXX Studios
- Genre: Nu metal; rap rock
- Length: 3:17
- Label: Bad Vibes Forever; Empire
- Songwriters: Jahseh Onfroy; John Cunningham; Travis Barker; Kanye West
- Producer: Cunningham

"One Minute" is a song by American rapper XXXTentacion featuring fellow American rapper Kanye West and American musician Travis Barker from the former's third studio album, Skins (2018) The music video was released on December 7, 2018, coinciding with the release of Skins.

== Reception ==
Controversy arose from West's lyrics: "Now your name is tainted, by the claims they paintin'/The defendant is guilty, no one blames the plaintiff", since they were viewed as victim blaming referring to XXXTentacion's charges of domestic abuse, which were dismissed after he was murdered. A source close to West reported to Billboard that he: "is not defending XXX or referencing anyone in particular". Throughout West's verse, he raps about the court of public opinion.

== Music ==
"One Minute" is described as "nu-metal track" by Vulture and a rap-rock frenzy by Pitchfork, as well as a "post-punk screamo frenzy" by HotNewHipHop. Loudwire compared the song's riff to Rage Against the Machine.

== Music video ==
The music video was released on December 7, 2018, as the first video for a song from Skins, but later removed from Vimeo. It uses raunchy animations to show large-busted women, aggressive scenes of violence, and depictions of the angsty lyrical content. JJ Villard provided the explicit animation for the music video. It was shown at the Skins Release Party when Kanye made his surprise appearance.

== Commercial performance ==
"One Minute" debuted at number 62 on the US Billboard Hot 100 upon the release of the album. It debuted at a similar position of number 69 on the Canadian Hot 100 in the same week.

== Personnel ==
Credits adapted from Tidal.

- XXXTentacion – primary artist, composer
- Kanye West – composer, featured artist
- Travis Barker – composer, drums
- John Cunningham – composer, producer
- Koen Heldens – mixing
- Brandon Brown – mixing assistant
- Dave Kutch – mastering
- Kevin Peterson – mastering assistant

== Charts ==
| Chart (2018) | Peak position |
|---|---|
| Canada Hot 100 (Billboard) | 69 |
| Swedish Heatseekers (Sverigetopplistan) | 18 |
| UK Hip Hop/R&B (OCC) | 30 |
| US Billboard Hot 100 | 62 |
