= Dreamin of the Past =

2022 song by Pusha T featuring Kanye West

Song by Pusha T featuring Kanye West

from the album It's Almost Dry
- Released: April 22, 2022
- Recorded: 2021
- Genre: Hip-hop
- Length: 2:54 (album version); 2:46 (visualizer)
- Label: GOOD; Def Jam
- Songwriters: Terrence Thornton; Kanye West; John Lennon
- Producer: Kanye West

Visualizer
- "Dreamin of the Past" on YouTube

"Dreamin of the Past" is a song by American rapper Pusha T featuring American rapper Kanye West from the former's fourth studio album, It's Almost Dry (2022). It was released as the album's third track on April 22, 2022, through GOOD Music and Def Jam Recordings. Written by both rappers and produced by West, the track contains samples of Donny Hathaway's 1972 cover of "Jealous Guy" by John Lennon, with Lennon being credited as a songwriter for its usage. The beat was originally made by West for his 2021 album Donda, though Pusha T was able to convince the rapper to let him use it.

"Dreamin of the Past" received positive reception from music critics, who often praised West's production. Upon the album's release, it peaked at number 81 on the Billboard Hot 100 and 28 on the Billboard Hot R&B/Hip-Hop Songs chart, also charting in Australia, Canada, and South Africa.

== Background and recording ==
The beat to "Dreamin of the Past" was created by Kanye West during sessions for his tenth studio album, Donda (2021). It was subsequently featured on a tracklist for the album as "Dreaming of the Past" on July 22, 2021, made right before West's listening party at the Mercedes-Benz Stadium. In an interview with Charlamagne tha God, Pusha T said that he "begged [West] for the beat", constantly asking to use it before West eventually agreed. Pusha T originally recorded a solo version before persuading West to contribute vocally, explaining to West that he wanted his feature to be short as a tribute to the Notorious B.I.G.'s guest verse on Lil' Kim's "Queen Bitch". The length of West's part was also influenced by Pusha T wanting to be the more prominent rapper vocally.

== Composition and lyrics ==
"Dreamin of the Past" was produced by West and features a short verse from him. It is built around a sampled loop of Donny Hathaway's 1972 cover of "Jealous Guy" by John Lennon. Due to the sample, Lennon is credited as a writer for the song. The production was often cited by critics as being similar to West's work from the early 2000s, with Mixmag attributing this to the prominently used piano riff from "Jealous Guy".

The lyrics to Pusha T's verses mainly focus on flexes and his rags to riches upbringing through selling cocaine. He reflects that, without his involvement in drug dealing, his family would have been poorer and unable to eat or celebrate Christmas. Pusha T describes himself as the current best rapper and compares himself to American football player Tom Brady in the sense that they both improve over time, further stating that he made a "better design" of the rap game without needing to "reinvent the wheel". Other lyrics include a "playful" reference to the rock band Third Eye Blind.

West's gust verse focuses on family-centered topics and opens by with him referencing the board game Monopoly due to owning "properties all across the board", referring to himself as being a "minister" in his prime in comparison to Shyne. He follows this with an anecdote about how he "used to watch The Fresh Prince and pray the house would be [his]", but after it was put up for rent on Airbnb for the show's thirty-year anniversary, he decided against it due to how the kitchen was designed. West claims that he was born in a manger comparably to Jesus, but grew up without a present father, calling him a "stranger". He mentions his own fatherhood by suggesting that his family with ex-wife Kim Kardashian is in danger ever since they got divorced.

== Live performances ==
Pusha T performed the song on April 21, 2022, on The Tonight Show Starring Jimmy Fallon, featuring a guest appearance from American hip-hop band the Roots. After their performance, Pusha T stated: "It's Almost Dry, out now. Rap album of the year." On August 18, Pusha T performed "Dreamin of the Past" along with "Brambleton" on Vevo Ctrl, a live performance series by Vevo. The performance for "Dreamin of the Past" was recorded in black and white, while "Brambleton" was set in red lighting.

== Critical reception ==
"Dreamin of the Past" received positive reception from music critics, with most focusing on West's production. Paul Thompson of Pitchfork noted West's production as one he might produce "around the turn of the century", comparing it to Jay-Z's 2001 West-produced single "Izzo (H.O.V.A.)" for being "maddening at first for the obviousness of its sample flip, and then for its effectiveness." William Rosebury of The Line of Best Fit commented on the sample, stating that West "returned to his signature soul-sampling" and called Pusha T's performance "as close to whimsical as he's ever likely to get." Revolt's Aqua Boogie rated "Dreamin of the Past" seventh on a top list of Pusha T and West collaborations.

== Commercial performance ==
Commercially, "Dreamin of the Past" debuted and peaked at number 81 on the Billboard Hot 100 and number 28 on the US Hot R&B/Hip-Hop Songs on the week of May 7, 2022. It also appeared in two other Billboard charts that week, including a position of number 54 on the Canada Hot 100 and a position of number 128 on the Global 200. Internationally, "Dreamin of the Past" peaked at number five on the New Zealand Hot Singles chart and number 52 on the South Africa Streaming chart.

== Credits and personnel ==
Credits adapted from Tidal.

- Pusha T – songwriter
- Kanye West – production, songwriter
- John Lennon – songwriter
- Michelle Mancini – mastering engineer
- Anthony Vilchis – mixing engineer, second engineer
- Trey Station – mixing engineer, second engineer
- Zach Pereyra – mixing engineer, second engineer
- Manny Marroquin – mixing engineer
- Noah Hashimoto – recording engineer, second engineer
- Andrew Coleman – recording engineer
- Nathaniel Alford – recording engineer
- Robert Ulsh – recording engineer

== Charts ==
Chart performance for "Dreamin of the Past"
Chart	Peak position
Canada Hot 100 (Billboard)	54
Global 200 (Billboard)	128
New Zealand Hot Singles (RMNZ)	5
South Africa Streaming (TOSAC)	52
US Billboard Hot 100	81
US Hot R&B/Hip-Hop Songs (Billboard)	28
