= Stay Up! (Viagra) =

Single by 88-Keys featuring Kanye West

from the album The Death of Adam
- Released: September 9, 2008
- Recorded: 2007
- Genre: Hip hop
- Length: 2:50
- Label: Decon
- Songwriters: S. Jolley; L. John; A. Ingram; T. Swain; K. West; C. Njapa
- Producers: 88-Keys; Kanye West (co.)

Kanye West singles chronology
| "Swagga Like Us" (2008) | "Stay Up! (Viagra)" (2008) | "Love Lockdown" (2008) |

"Stay Up! (Viagra)" is the first single released from producer-rapper 88-Keys' debut album The Death of Adam and features the album's co-executive producer Kanye West. The song samples "All Night Loving" by British R&B three-piece band Imagination. The single was released digitally on August 25, 2008. According to both artists, the song, which follows the overall storyline of the concept album, is about a man named Adam, who after a bad string of relationships, decides to take Viagra (Sildenafil Citrate) in an attempt to "stay up" longer. A snippet of the track was first previewed on Kanye West's 2007 Can't Tell Me Nothing mixtape and featured an additional spoken word verse delivered by Malik Yusef.

== Music video ==
The music video premiered across multiple MTV channels all day on Monday, March 16, 2009.

Shot in High Definition on the streets of Los Angeles, the video features 88-Keys (Clifford) and Kanye West (Rufus) dressed in full prosthetic makeup made to appear in their late sixties, out on a night on the town. Utilizing the talents of makeup artist Tony Gardner of Alterian Effects (Michael Jackson's Thriller, Hairspray, Shallow Hal, Seed of Chucky, Daft Punk) the video creates an intimate and comedic look at the two real life friends.

According to director Jason Goldwatch,

The ‘Stay Up!' (Viagra) video represents a new wave in the Music Video. It is a smash up of music video, reality television, and highbrow conceptual art. By taking some of the world’s biggest stars, who are normally surrounded by security and droves of crazed fans, and hiding their identity, we allow them to interact with the ‘real world’, unrecognized, unhindered, and free to walk alone – almost as if new people.
