= No Face (Ghostface Killah and Kanye West song) =

Single by Ghostface Killah and Kanye West

from the album Set the Tone (Guns & Roses)
- Released: May 31, 2024
- Genre: Hip hop
- Length: 4:35
- Label: Mass Appeal
- Songwriters: Dennis Coles; Lamont Porter; Thomas Bell; William Hart; Kanye West
- Producers: Backpack; EZ Elpee

Ghostface Killah singles chronology
"Scar Tissue" (2024)	"No Face" (2024)

Kanye West singles chronology
"Carnival" (2024)	"No Face" (2024)	"Gimme a Second 2" (2024)

"No Face" is a song by American rapper Ghostface Killah and American rapper Kanye West. It was included as a track on the former's 2024 album, Set the Tone (Guns & Roses), released on May 10. It was later released on May 31, 2024, as the album's second single.

== Background and release ==
The track is a collaboration between Ghostface Killah and Kanye West, marking the third time the two have collaborated. They previously worked together on the remix of the former's "Back Like That" (2006), as well as on "New God Flow.1", an alternate version of West's "New God Flow" (2012). Ghostface Killah also previously teased a 2022 release for Supreme Clientele 2, a sequel to his 2000 album, stating it would be executive produced by West. It is unknown if "No Face" was originally set to appear on Supreme Clientele 2. Ghostface Killah was also set to release an album on West's Stem Player platform.

Produced by EZ Elpee and Backpack, "No Face" is the seventh (Note: Sources have listed it as the sixth track, though this was done so excluding non-song skits that appeared on the album.) track on Ghostface's Set the Tone (Guns & Roses), released through Mass Appeal Records on May 10, 2024. The song was then released as a single on May 31, 2024.

== Reception ==
Teejay Smith of HotNewHipHop opined that the track helped maintain interest in the album's first half. West's feature received praise from music reviewers. Brad Callas of Complex wrote that the track is a stand out on Set the Tone and yielded "one of Ye's best featured verses in years". HotNewHipHop's Zachary Horvath concurred with this, calling it one of West's "better verses". Robin Murray of Clash also complimented West's performance, stating "he doesn't phone it in" and opining that his verse is "thorough and thought through, if veering from excellent to awful in the same few bars".

== Credits and personnel ==
Credits adapted from Tidal.

- Ghostface Killah – songwriter, lead vocals
- Kanye West – songwriter, lead vocals
- EZ Elpee – producer, songwriter
- Jeremy "Backpack" Miller – producer
- Thomas Bell – songwriter
- William Hart – songwriter
- Jun Kim – mixing, assistant recording engineer
- David Kim – mixing engineer
- Mike Bozzi – mastering engineer
- Oscar Cornejo – recording engineer
- Ray Ray Scavo III – recording engineer
- Mark "Exit" Goodchild – A&R coordinator
- Dennis Coles BMI – music publisher
