= List of Kanye West samples and sampling disputes =

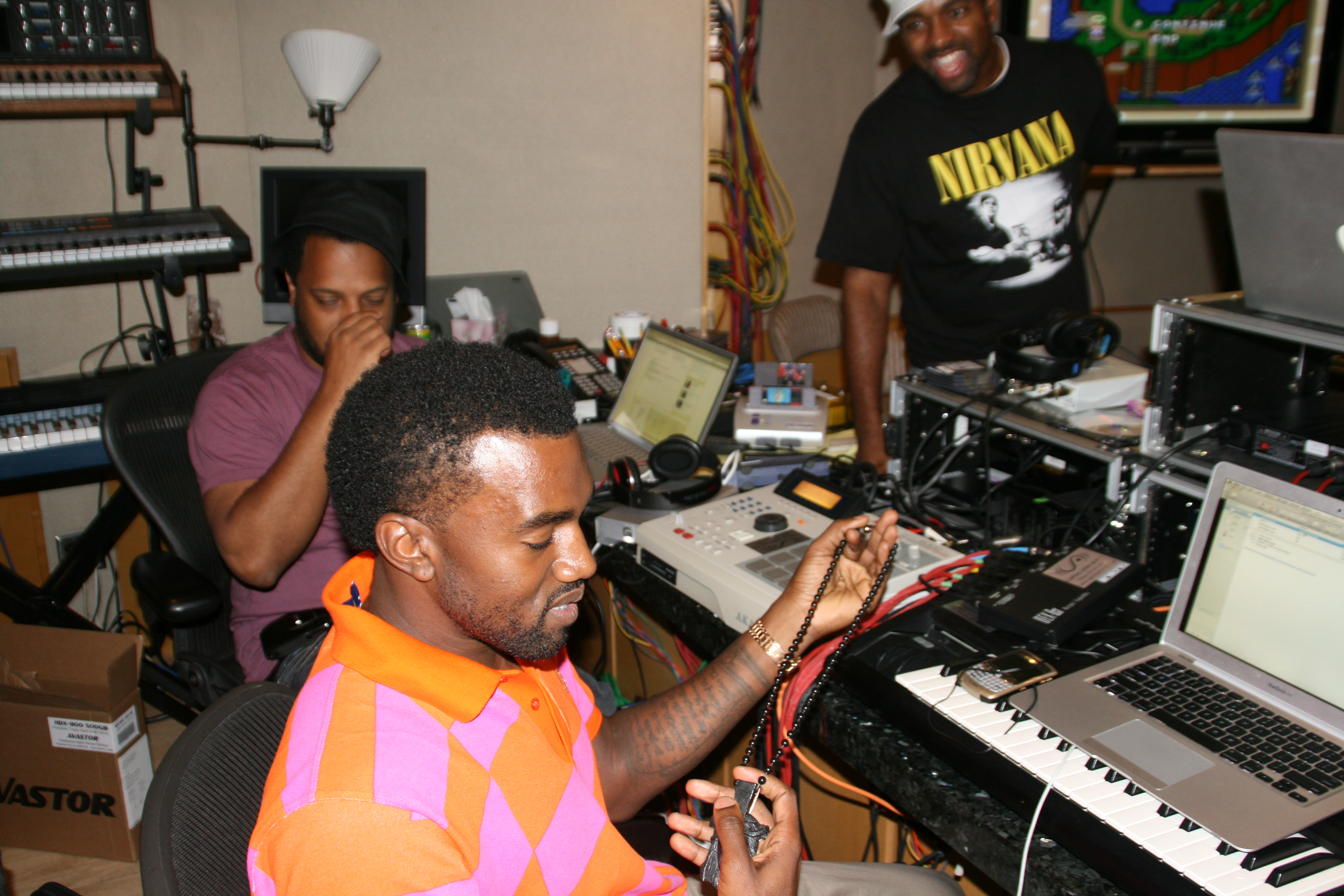
West in the studio.

Throughout the course of his career, American rapper Kanye West has been recognized for his frequent use of sampling, or the practice of taking of parts from other songs to incorporate into his own. Following the release of The Life of Pablo in 2016, Vice Media wrote: "West's knack for picking samples, both obscure and unexpected, (and the right producers to turn them into chart-topping hits) remains unparalleled."

However, West has also been involved in many disputes, some legal, over the lack of formal authorization for his samples. Several of West's most well-known songs, such as "Gold Digger" and "Bound 2", have been involved in cases of copyright infringement due to issues pertaining to sample clearance, while other samples were still used willfully by West despite him having been denied permission for them. Spanning songs across two decades from Late Registration to the Vultures series, most cases of West's illegal sampling in his music have arrived at private settlements, while others have successfully demanded that songs be withdrawn from circulation or modified under threat of legal action.

== The College Dropout ==
Track	Sample	Ref
"We Don't Care"	"I Just Wanna Stop" by The Jimmy Castor Bunch	
"Graduation Day"	"Pomp and Circumstance—March No. 1" by Edward Elgar	
"All Falls Down"	"Mystery of Iniquity" by Lauryn Hill	
"Spaceship"	"Distant Lover" by Marvin Gaye	
"Jesus Walks"	"Walk With Me" by The ARC Choir	
"Jesus Walks"	"(Don't Worry) If There's a Hell Below, We're All Going to Go" by Curtis Mayfield	
"Never Let Me Down"	"Maybe It's the Power of Love" by Blackjack	
"Slow Jamz"	"A House Is Not A Home" by Luther Vandross	
"School Spirit"	"Spirit in the Dark" by Aretha Franklin	
"Two Words"	"Peace and Love (Amani Na Mapenzi): Movement IV (Encounter)" by Mandrill	
"Through the Wire"	"Through the Fire" by Chaka Khan	
"Family Business"	"Fonky Thang, Diamon' Rang" by The Dells	
"Last Call"	"Mr. Rockefeller" by Bette Midler	

== Late Registration ==
Track	Sample	Ref
"Wake Up Mr. West"	"Someone That I Used to Love" by Natalie Cole	
"Heard 'Em Say"	"Someone That I Used to Love" by Natalie Cole	
"Touch the Sky"	"Move On Up" by Curtis Mayfield	
"Gold Digger"	"I Got a Woman" by Ray Charles	
"Drive Slow"	"Wildflower" by Hank Crawford	
"My Way Home"	"Home Is Where The Hatred Is" by Gil Scott-Heron	
"Crack Music"	"Since You Came in My Life" by New York Community Choir	
"Crack Music"	"It's Your Thing" by Cold Grits	
"Roses"	"Rosie" by Bill Withers	
"Addiction"	"My Funny Valentine" by Etta James	
"Diamonds from Sierra Leone"	"Diamonds Are Forever" by Shirley Bassey	
"We Major"	"Action" by Orange Krush	
"Hey Mama"	"Today Won't Come Again" by Donal Leace	
"Celebration"	"Heavenly Dream" by The Kay-Gees	
"Gone"	"It's Too Late" by Otis Redding	
"Late"	"I'll Erase Away Your Pain" by The Whatnauts	

=== "Gold Digger" ===
In April 2013, two family members of late musician David Pryor—Trena Steward and Lorenzo Pryor—sued West on the grounds that "Gold Digger" used an unauthorized sample from "Bumpin' Bus Stop," a song from Pryor's group called Thunder And Lightning. Pryor had died in 2006, one year after "Gold Digger" was released; it would take six years until his estate was probated, thus allowing his two family members to file. The lawsuit was filed in the Los Angeles County Superior Court. In it, Pryor's two family members stated that a portion of "Bumpin' Bus Stop" in which Pryor says "get down" three times, which appears 13 seconds into the song, was appropriated for the "Gold Digger" line: "Get down girl, go ahead, get down."

The case was eventually dismissed in 2014. The judge ruled that West's sample was used de minimis, "meaning so short that they didn't count as copyright infringement", and stated that "the average audience would not recognize plaintiffs' song in any of defendants' songs without actively searching for it."

=== "Gone" ===
In May 2008, Joe Farrell's daughter, Kathleen Firrantello, accused West of having sampled "Upon This Rock," a 1974 song by Farrell, for West's "Gone." Firrantello sought damages up to $1,000,000 and demanded "no more copies of the songs be made, sold or performed." The case also implicated three other rappers and their respective songs: Common's "Chi-City," as well as Method Man and Redman's "Run 4 Cover."

Firrantello and West reached a settlement in 2010.

== Graduation ==
Track	Sample	Ref
"Good Morning"	"Someone Saved My Life Tonight" by Elton John	
"Champion"	"Kid Charlemagne" by Steely Dan	
"Stronger"	"Harder, Better, Faster, Stronger" by Daft Punk	
"I Wonder"	"My Song" by Labi Siffre and "Phantom" by Justice	
"Good Life"	"P.Y.T. (Pretty Young Thing)" by Michael Jackson	
"Barry Bonds"	"Long Red" by Mountain	
"Drunk and Hot Girls"	"Sing Swan Song" by Can	
"Everything I Am"	"If We Can't Be Lovers" by Prince Phillip Mitchell	
"Everything I Am"	"Bring the Noise" by Public Enemy	
"The Glory"	"Save the Country" by Laura Nyro	
"The Glory"	"Long Red" by Mountain	

== 808s & Heartbreak ==
Track	Sample	Ref
"RoboCop"	"Kissing in the Rain" by Patrick Doyle	
"Bad News"	"See Line Woman" by Nina Simone	
"Coldest Winter"	"Memories Fade" by Tears for Fears	

== My Beautiful Dark Twisted Fantasy ==
Track	Sample	Ref
"Dark Fantasy"	"In High Places" by Mike Oldfield and Jon Anderson	
"Gorgeous"	"You Showed Me" by The Turtles	
"Power"	"It's Your Thing" by Cold Grits	
"Power"	"Afromerica" by Continent Number 6	
"Power"	"21st Century Schizoid Man" by King Crimson	
"So Appalled"	"You Are – I Am" by Manfred Mann's Earth Band	
"Devil in a New Dress"	"Will You Love Me Tomorrow" by Smokey Robinson	
"Runaway"	"Expo 83" by Backyard Heavies	
"Runaway"	Rick James Live at Long Beach, CA, 1981	
"Hell of a Life"	"She's My Baby" by The Mojo Men	
"Hell of a Life"	"Stud-Spider" by Tony Joe White	
"Hell of a Life"	"Iron Man" by Black Sabbath	
"Blame Game"	"Avril 14th" by Aphex Twin	
"Lost in the World"	"Soul Makossa" by Manu Dibango	
"Lost in the World"	"Think (About It)" by Lyn Collins	
"Lost in the World"	"Woods" by Bon Iver	
"Who Will Survive in America"	"Comment No. 1" by Gil Scott-Heron	

=== "Blame Game" ===
Richard D. James, known by his stage name Aphex Twin, claimed that West tried to sample the piano melody of "Avril 14th" for his song "Blame Game" featuring John Legend and Chris Rock without compensation. James had offered to re-polish and even re-record "Avril 14th" for West's team, to which West's team acted "rude" toward James and acted as though the sample was theirs to freely use: "They totally didn't even say 'hello' or 'thanks'... they just replied with, 'It's not yours, it's ours, and we're not even asking you any more.'"

== Watch the Throne ==
Track	Sample	Ref
"No Church in the Wild"	"K-Scope" by Phil Manzanera	
"Lift Off"	"Sunshine Help Me" by Spooky Tooth	
"Lift Off"	"Don't Tell a Lie About Me (and I Won't Tell the Truth About You)" by James Brown	
"Lift Off"	Video of the Apollo 11 launch	
"Niggas in Paris"	"Baptizing Scene" by Reverend W. A. Donaldson	
"Niggas in Paris"	Blades of Glory	
"Otis"	"Try a Little Tenderness" by Otis Redding	
"Otis"	"Don't Tell a Lie About Me (and I Won't Tell the Truth About You)" by James Brown	
"Otis"	"Top Billin'" by Audio Two	
"Gotta Have It"	"Don't Tell a Lie About Me (and I Won't Tell the Truth About You)" by James Brown	
"Gotta Have It"	"People Get Up and Drive Your Funky Soul" by James Brown	
"Gotta Have It"	"My Thang" by James Brown	
"New Day"	"Feeling Good" by Nina Simone	
"That's My Bitch"	"Get Up, Get Into It, Get Involved" by James Brown	
"That's My Bitch"	"Apache" by Incredible Bongo Band	
"Who Gon Stop Me	"I Can't Stop" by Flux Pavilion	
"Murder to Excellence"	"LA LA LA" by The Indiggo Twins	
"Murder to Excellence"	"Celie Shaves Mr./Scarification" by Quincy Jones	
"Why I Love You"	"I <3 U So" by Cassius	
"Primetime"	"Action" by Orange Krush	
"The Joy"	"The Makings of You (Live)" by Curtis Mayfield	
"The Joy"	"Different Strokes" by Syl Johnson	

=== "The Joy" ===
In October 2011, blues and soul artist Syl Johnson accused West and Jay-Z of sampling Johnson's 1967 song "Different Strokes" for their song "The Joy". Johnson claimed the sample was used without permission, credit, and payment to him; he additionally stated that West had previously tried to seek permission to sample "Different Strokes" on a song for the 2010 album My Beautiful Dark Twisted Fantasy but was denied back then as well, making his potential copyright infringement willful. The case was filed on October 14 in Illinois federal court. Johnson sought "injunction, actual and punitive damages and attorney's fees."

That December, West and Jay-Z denied Johnson's accusations and claimed he had no copyright to infringe upon due to the song's recording prior to 1972. However, both parties would eventually settle privately for an undisclosed amount in March 2012.

== Yeezus ==
Track	Sample	Ref
"On Sight"	"Sermon (He'll Give Us What We Really Need)" by Holy Name Of Mary Choral Family	
"I Am a God"	"Forward Inna Dem Clothes" by Capleton	
"I Am a God"	"Are Zindagi Hai Khel" by Manna Dey and Asha Bhosle	
"New Slaves"	"HBA War" by DUTCH E GERM	
"New Slaves"	"Gyöngyhajú lány" by Omega	
"I'm in It"	"Lately" by Kenny Lattimore	
"Blood on the Leaves"	"Strange Fruit" by Nina Simone	
"Blood on the Leaves"	"R U Ready" by TNGHT	
"Blood on the Leaves"	Interpolation of "Down for My N's" by C-Murder and Snoop Dogg	
"Guilt Trip"	Interpolation of "Chief Rocka" by Lords of the Underground	
"Guilt Trip"	"Blocka" (Ackeejuice Rockers remix) by Pusha T, Travis Scott, and Popcaan	
"Send It Up"	"Memories" by Beenie Man	
"Bound 2"	"Aeroplane (Reprise)" by Wee	
"Bound 2"	"Bound" by Ponderosa Twins Plus One	
"Bound 2"	"Sweet Nothin's" by Brenda Lee	

=== "Black Skinhead" ===
Upon the release of "Black Skinhead," many publications reported that the song sampled Marilyn Manson's "The Beautiful People," specifically its drum beat. However, it was revealed that the beat was entirely created from scratch by West.

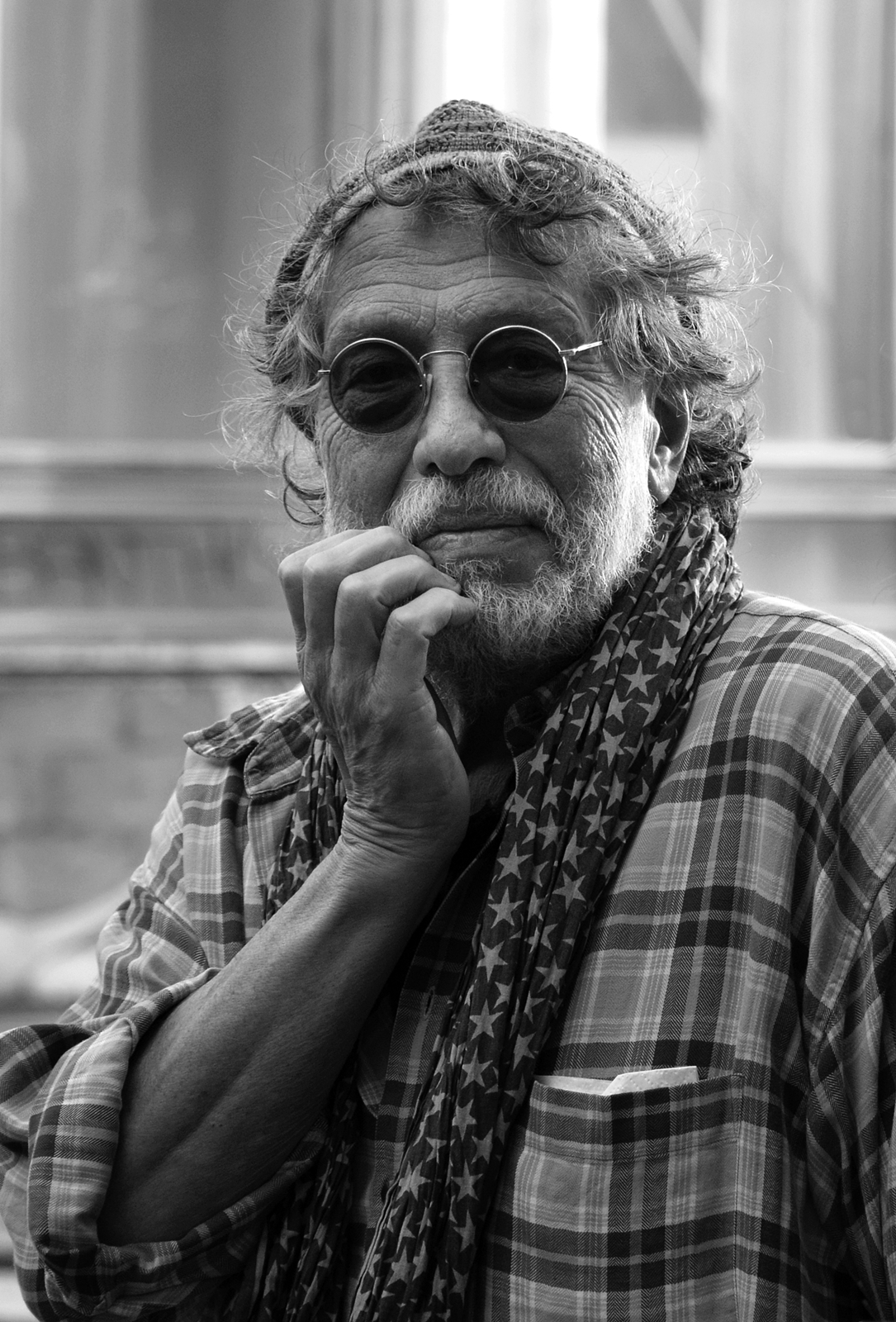
Presser, who sued West for an unauthorized sample in "New Slaves".

=== "New Slaves" ===
On May 20, 2016, Gábor Presser of the Hungarian rock band Omega sued West for using Omega's 1969 song "Gyöngyhajú Lány" in his own song "New Slaves". In his lawsuit filed in United States District Court for the Southern District of New York, Presser sought $2,500,000, stating that after The Yeezus Tour began in May 2013, West's lawyers attempted to quickly resolve any possible disputes with Presser within a 24-hour period by offering a $10,000 check, but Presser never agreed. Specifically, Presser's complaint read: "West knowingly and intentionally misappropriated plaintiff's composition. After his theft was discovered, defendants refused to deal fairly with plaintiff."

West tried to dismiss the lawsuit entirely, as well as relocate it entirely to the West Coast, though both efforts were unsuccessful. Presser's filing in New York City meant that West was demanded to appear there for deposition despite living in Los Angeles with his then-wife, Kim Kardashian, and their two children. However, upon asking for depositions to at least occur in Los Angeles, the judge presiding over the case granted West's request. A trial was then due to begin on May 15, 2017, but in the preceding March, West and Presser settled out of court for an undisclosed amount. Presser's lawyer, Peter Cane, stated that the dispute "has been resolved amicably".

=== "Bound 2" ===
At the end of 2013, Ricky Spicer, a singer in the group Ponderosa Twins Plus One, sued West for sampling the group's song "Bound" for his own song "Bound 2" without permission. The case was filed in New York, and Spicer sought "an injunction and damages for alleged violations of New York civil right of publicity law... unjust enrichment and common law copyright infringement."

In May 2015, West and Spicer reached a settlement agreement with undisclosed details.

== The Life of Pablo ==
Track	Sample	Ref
"Ultralight Beam"	YouTube video	
"Father Stretch My Hands"	"Father I Stretch My Hands" by Pastor T. L. Barrett	
"Pt. 2"	"Panda" by Desiigner	
"Pt. 2"	"Father I Stretch My Hands" by Pastor T. L. Barrett	
"Pt. 2"	Sound effect from Street Fighter II: The World Warrior	
"Famous"	Sample and interpolation of "Do What You Gotta Do" by Nina Simone	
"Famous"	"Bam Bam" by Sister Nancy	
"Famous"	"Mi Sono Svegliato E... Ho Chiuso Gli Occhi" by Il Rovescio della Medaglia.	
"Feedback"	"Talagh" by Googoosh	
"Low Lights"	"So Alive (Acapella)" by Kings of Tomorrow	
"Freestyle 4"	"Human" by Goldfrapp	
"Waves"	"Fantastic Freaks at the Dixie" by Fantastic Freaks	
"FML"	"Hit" by Section 25	
"Real Friends"	"Friends" by Whodini	
"30 Hours"	"Answers Me" by Arthur Russell	
"30 Hours"	Interpolation of "Hot in Herre" by Nelly	
"30 Hours"	"Joy" by Isaac Hayes	
"No More Parties in LA"	"Give Me My Love" by Johnny "Guitar" Watson	
"No More Parties in LA"	"Suzie Thundertussy" by Walter "Junie" Morrison	
"No More Parties in LA"	"Mighty Healthy" by Ghostface Killah	
"No More Parties in LA"	"Stand Up and Shout About Love" by Larry Graham Jr.	
"Facts" (Charlie Heat version)	"Dirt and Grime" by Father's Children	
"Facts" (Charlie Heat version)	Interpolation of "Jumpman" by Drake and Future	
"Facts" (Charlie Heat version)	Sound effect from Street Fighter II: The World Warrior	
"Fade"	"(I Know) I'm Losing You" by Rare Earth	
"Fade"	"(I Know) I'm Losing You" by The Undisputed Truth	
"Fade"	"Mystery of Love" by Mr. Fingers	
"Fade"	"Deep Inside" by Hardrive	
"Fade"	"I Get Lifted (The Underground Network Mix)" by Barbara Tucker	
"Fade"	Interpolation of "Rock the Boat" by Aaliyah	
"Saint Pablo"	"Where I'm From" by Jay-Z	

=== "Ultralight Beam" ===
In February 2019, the adoptive parents of a girl named Natalie Green sued West for illegally using a clip of Green's voice at the start of the song "Ultralight Beam". They had adopted Green in 2012, four years before the video recording in question which West later sampled. West's lawyers stated that they had sought permission from Green's birth mother, Alice Johnson, who filmed the video recording, but Johnson was no longer Green's legal parent by then, making her unable to clear the sample, according to Green's adoptive parents. Furthermore, Green's adoptive parents stated that Johnson never formally agreed to the "Ultralight Beam" sample via paperwork anyway. The case was filed in the United States District Court for the District of South Carolina; Green's adoptive parents sought profits and various damages.

At first, West attempted to dismiss the lawsuit. Later, in November 2020, West and Green's adoptive parents reached a settlement offer that they found "reasonable and proper and in the best interests of N.G., a minor, and adequately protects her interests." The settlement was a total of $350,000—$125,000 went to Green's adoptive parents, $60,000 went to an unnamed person in the video recording, and $165,000 went to the lawyers who filed on their behalf.

== Ye ==
Track	Sample	Ref
"I Thought About Killing You" (original version)	"Fr3sh" by Kareem Lotfy	
"Yikes"	"Kothbiro" by Black Savage	
"Wouldn't Leave"	"Baptizing Scene" by Reverend W.A. Donaldson	
"No Mistakes"	"Children (Get Together)" by Edwin Hawkins Singers	
"No Mistakes"	"Hey Young World" by Slick Rick	
"Ghost Town"	"Take Me for a Little While" by The Royal Jesters	
"Ghost Town"	"Someday" by Shirley Ann Lee	

== Kids See Ghosts ==
Track	Sample	Ref
"Fire"	"They're Coming to Take Me Away, Ha-Haaa!" by Jerry "Napoleon XIV" Samuels	
"4th Dimension"	"What Will Santa Claus Say (When He Finds Everybody Swingin')" by Louis Prima	
"4th Dimension"	"Someday" by Shirley Ann Lee	
"Freeee (Ghost Town, Pt. 2)"	"Stark" by Corin "Mr. Chop" Littler	
"Freeee (Ghost Town, Pt. 2)"	The Spirit Of Marcus Garvey (Garvey speaks to an all-Black audience) by Ronald Oslin Bobb-Semple	
"Freeee (Ghost Town, Pt. 2)"	"Ghost Town" by Kanye West	
"Cudi Montage"	"Burn the Rain" by Kurt Cobain	

=== "Freeee (Ghost Town, Pt. 2)" ===
In March 2019, actor Ronald Oslin Bobb-Semple claimed that West and Kid Cudi's "Freeee (Ghost Town, Pt. 2)" illegally sampled his 2002 one-man show titled "The Spirit Of Marcus Garvey (Garvey speaks to an all-Black audience)" without providing credit or compensation. As Ty Dolla Sign was featured on the song, he was also named in the lawsuit. West admitted to sampling Bobb-Semple's one-man show without permission but claimed the sample's usage fell under fair use and thus demanded that the case be dismissed. In January 2020, Bobb-Semple and West settled.

== Jesus Is King ==
Track	Sample	Ref
"Selah"	"Revelations 19:1" by the New Jerusalem Baptism Choir	
"Follow God"	"Can You Lose By Following God" by Whole Truth	
"Closed on Sunday"	"Martín Fierro" by Grupo Vocal Argentino	
"On God"	"Lambo" by A Tribe Called Quest and Busta Rhymes	
"Water"	"Snow Job" by Bruce Haack	
"God Is"	"God Is" by James Cleveland and the Southern California Community Choir	
"Use This Gospel"	"Costume Party" by Two Door Cinema Club	
"Jesus Is Lord"	"Un Homme Dans La Nuit" by Claude Léveillée	

== Donda ==
Track	Sample	Ref
"God Breathed"	"Bell Head" by Liquid Liquid	
"Believe What I Say"	"Doo Wop (That Thing)" by Lauryn Hill	
"Believe What I Say"	"12345678" by TSVI	
"Remote Control" (original and part 2)	Strawinsky and the Mysterious House	
"Heaven and Hell"	"Heaven and Hell Is on Earth" by 20th Century Steel Band	
"Lord I Need You"	"Make Me Over" by Briana Babineaux	
"Life of the Party"	"I Was the Life of the Party" by The Dramatics	
"Life of the Party"	"Cannibal Cutie" by Herb and the Spices	
"Life of the Party"	Video of DMX and his daughter	
"Life of the Party"	"South Bronx" by Boogie Down Productions (Stem Player version)	
"New Again"	"As 1" by Mapei	
"Donda"	Interpolation of "Candy" by Kate Bollinger	

=== "Hurricane" and "Moon" ===
In July 2024, a music company called Artist Revenue Advocates sued West for using their instrumental song "MSD PT2" in both "Hurricane" and "Moon". The song had been created by Khalil Abdul-Rahman, Sam Barsh, Dan Seeff, and Josh Mease, all of whom West credited yet didn't ask permission from. The case was filed in California's federal court, demanded damages and an order to block the song, and is still pending.

=== "Come to Life" ===
In May 2022, Texas pastor David P. Moten sued West for using one minute and ten seconds of Moten's recorded sermon in "Come to Life". Moten filed the lawsuit in the United States District Court for the Northern District of Illinois. He demanded for the case to go to trial by jury and additionally sought damages.

Later, Moten filed his lawsuit again under a different federal court. The case is still pending; a trial date is set for June 2025.

=== "Life of the Party" ===
In November 2022, music company Phase One Network accused West of sampling Boogie Down Productions' song "South Bronx" for the Stem Player version of his and André 3000's song "Life of the Party". According to the case, West had submitted and then subsequently retracted a request to clear the sample in 2021. Kano Computing, the tech company that designed West's Stem Player, was also named in the lawsuit.

West claimed that KRS-One, a founder of Boogie Down Productions, stated that any rapper sampling his work would not be sued. The statement originated from a clip in a 2006 documentary titled The Art of 16 Bars. In August 2024, both sides settled with an undisclosed agreement.

=== "Lord I Need You" ===
Gospel singer Briana Babineaux stated that she was unaware that vocals from her rendition of "Make Me Over" were sampled in "Lord I Need You". However, the original composer of the song, B.Slade, pushed back against Babineaux's claims and stated that West had cleared the sample with him, "the rightful owner of the song legally."

== Donda 2 ==
Track	Sample	Ref
"True Love"	"The Basement" by Pete Rock & CL Smooth	
"Flowers"	"Move Your Body" by Marshall Jefferson	
"Security"	"Wanna Trap" by Mica Levi	
"Security"	Monologue by DJ Akademiks (original streaming version)	
"530"	"Break the Fall (Acoustic)" by Swsh	
"City of Chi"	"間奏曲 (Intermezzo)" by Mr. Sirius	
"Sci-Fi"	Monologue by Kim Kardashian from Saturday Night Live	
"Louie Bags"	"We did it, Joe!"	
"Lord Lift Me Up"	"Just Out of My Reach" by Sam Dees	
"Eazy"	"Eazy-Duz-It" by Eazy-E	

=== "Flowers" ===
In June 2022, music company Ultra International sued West for sampling the 1986 song "Move Your Body" by Marshall Jefferson in "Flowers", a song on the demo album Donda 2. The company, along with Jefferson, stated that West had used the illegal sample 22 times. In their lawsuit, they stated West admitted to sampling it without seeking permission or any other agreement. The case was filed in the United States District Court for the Southern District of New York; Ultra International and Jefferson demanded profits and damages along with an end to distribution and a trial by jury.

In November 2022, West's counsel, Greenberg Traurig, attempted to drop their legal representation of West following antisemitic remarks that he made. At the time, West was unreachable, and the judge presiding over the case eventually granted West's lawyers' request for withdrawal as long as they could serve the notice to him. However, despite West's lawyers' attempts to contact him by phone, by his employees, and by other means, they stated to the judge that they were ultimately unable to serve him the notice. The judge then told them to try again, as their efforts did not "indicate diligent efforts at attempting to locate Ye." In February 2023, West was dropped by his counsel, Greenberg Traurig, following antisemitic remarks that he made. Later in May, West settled with Ultra International and Jefferson.

== Vultures 1 ==
Track	Sample	Ref
"Stars"	"Good Luck" by Dijon	
"Stars"	Interpolation of "Junya" by Kanye West and Playboi Carti	
"Keys to My Life"	"Can It Be All So Simple / Intermission" by Wu-Tang Clan	
"Keys to My Life"	"Slow Down" by Brand Nubian	
"Paid"	"Brighter Days (Underground Goodies Mix)" by Cajmere and Dajae	
"Paid"	"Get on Up" by Jodeci	
"Paid"	Interpolation of "Roxanne" by The Police	
"Paid"	Video of Marshawn Lynch	
"Talking"	"Bring The Noise" by Public Enemy	
"Talking"	"You Don't Want No Problems, You Just Talk Like You Do!" by Courtney Renà	
"Back to Me"	"Rock Box" by Run-DMC	
"Back to Me"	"One Way Flight" by Benny the Butcher and Freddie Gibbs	
"Back to Me"	Dogma	
"Hoodrat"	Hotboxin' with Mike Tyson	
"Do It"	Interpolation of "Back That Azz Up" by Juvenile, Lil Wayne, and Mannie Fresh	
"Do It"	"I Just Wanna Know" by Ty Dolla $ign, Nipsey Hussle, and Cardi B	
"Paperwork"	"Montagem Faz Macete 3.0" by DJ Vitinho Beat, DJ Roca, MC Neguin MT, and MC Magrinho	
"Paperwork"	"Ay Si Ñiño" (remix) by Rochy RD and Mafeo 13	
"Burn"	"Love Me or Leave Me" by Band of Thieves	
"Fuk Sumn"	"Smoking on a Junt"' by Koopsta Knicca	
"Fuk Sumn"	Funky President (People It's Bad)" by James Brown	
"Vultures"	"Cold" by Kanye West and DJ Khaled	
"Vultures"	"Pimpin' & Robbin'" by Three 6 Mafia	
"Carnival"	"Iron Man" by Black Sabbath (listening party preview)	
"Carnival"	"Hell of a Life" by Kanye West (streaming release)	
"Beg Forgiveness"	"Gabriel" by Joe Goddard and Valentina	
"Good (Don't Die)"	Interpolation of "I Feel Love" by Donna Summer	
"Problematic"	"Jubilation" by Spooky Tooth	
"Problematic"	Interpolation of "So Appalled" by Kanye West, Jay-Z, Pusha T, Cyhi the Prynce, Swizz Beatz, and RZA	
"King"	"Hit It Run" by Run-DMC	
"King"	"Crazy Train" by Ozzy Osbourne	
"King"	"Stems" by S.Maharba	

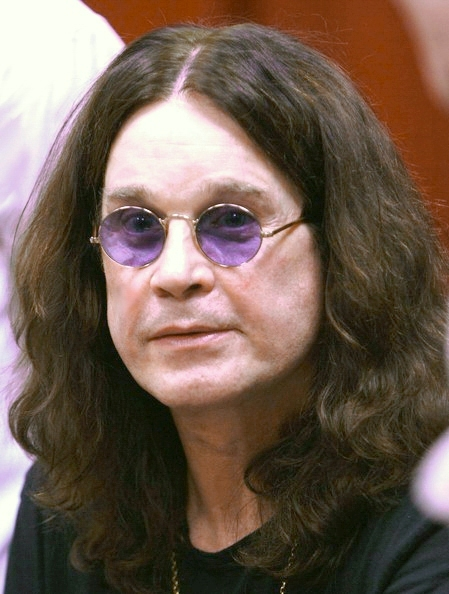
Osbourne, who threatened legal action against West and Ty Dolla Sign for an unauthorized sample used in previews of "Carnival".

=== "Carnival" ===
The original version of "Carnival" on Vultures 1 used a sample from Black Sabbath's live performance of "Iron Man" from 1983. Shortly after the album's release, Ozzy Osbourne stated that he had refused to clear the sample for West on grounds that he was "an antisemite and has caused untold heartache to many". Upon seeing West proceed with the sample anyway without permission, Osbourne threatened legal action. Afterward, West removed the sample from "Carnival" and replaced it with a different sample originally used in West's 2010 song "Hell of a Life" from My Beautiful Dark Twisted Fantasy; "Hell of a Life" contains an interpolation of "Iron Man".

=== "Fuk Sumn" ===
In November 2024, several hip-hop artists from Memphis, Tennessee sued West and Ty Dolla Sign for using the 1994 song "Drank a Yak (Part 2)" in the Vultures 1 song "Fuk Sumn" without credit or compensation. The Memphis musicians claimed to have participated in talks for sample clearance with West and Ty Dolla Sign, but no formal agreement was reached due to stalls in discussion as a result of the turnover of Yeezy employees in June 2022. The case is ongoing.

=== "Good (Don't Die)" ===
In February 2024, Donna Summer's estate sued West and Ty Dolla Sign for interpolating Summer's 1977 song "I Feel Love" in their Vultures 1 song "Good (Don't Die)". When West had approached the estate earlier to clear the sample, they denied it, stating they didn't want to associate with West following his controversies: "The Summer Estate sought to protect the valuable intellectual property... from any public association with the negative publicity surrounding West." Afterward, West had singer J. Rey Soul re-record parts of Summer's song to use as a hook which "shocked" the estate. The case was filed in the federal court of Los Angeles.

In June 2024, West and Summer's estate reached a settlement agreement; one term was that West and Ty Dolla Sign would not distribute "Good (Don't Die)", thus leading to its removal from the Vultures 1 track list.

== Vultures 2 ==
Track	Sample	Ref
"Field Trip"	"Machine Gun" by Portishead	
"Isabella"	"Shoes" by Isabella	
"530"	"Break the Fall (Acoustic)" by Swsh	
"River"	"River" by Leon Bridges	
"Forever"	"Maybe" by Kettenkarrussell	
"Lifestyle"	"Love Is Gone" by Nico Baran	
"Lifestyle"	"When the Levee Breaks" by Led Zeppelin	
"Sky City"	Interpolation of "O-o-h Child" by the Five Stairsteps	
"Take Off Your Dress"	"Please Make It Good Again" by Talmadge Armstrong	
"Gun To My Head"	"Blindside" by Alice Merton	
"Can U Be"	Dialogue from Silver Linings Playbook	
"Can U Be"	"Stop, Look, Listen (to Your Heart)" by Diana Ross and Marvin Gaye	

=== "Field Trip" ===
On social media, Portishead member Geoff Barrow criticized West and Ty Dolla Sign for sampling his band's song "Machine Gun" for their song "Field Trip" featuring Playboi Carti, Don Toliver, and Kodak Black. However, legal action did not follow.

=== "530" ===
American musician Swsh stated that they found out on the morning of Vultures 2's release that the song "530" had sampled their music without authorization. Later, on February 12th, 2026, the artist would file a lawsuit over Copyright Infringement. The case was put on hold temporarily and was reopened on March 14th, 2026. The case is still pending, with an extended time to answer the complaint due to May 14th, 2026.

== Bully ==
Track	Sample	Ref
"King"	"Reach for a Star" by Duke Edwards and the Youngones	
"Father"	"Heavenly Father, You've Been Good" by Johnnie Frierson	
"Father"	CNN interview of James Brown	
"All the Love"	"Fayek Alaya" by Fairuz	
"Punch Drunk"	"I Can Do All Things Through Christ" by The Clark Sisters	
"Whatever Works"	"Don't Wonder Why" by Cissy Houston	
"Mama's Favorite"	Donda West from Jeen-Yuhs: A Kanye Trilogy	
"Sisters and Brothers"	"Get Involved" by Jonah Thompson	
"Bully"	Interpolation of "Mujhe Maar Daalo" by Asha Bhosle	
"Bully"	Interpolation of Nelson Muntz from the Simpsons's "Haw-haw!" catchphrase	
"I Can't Wait"	Interpolation of "You Can't Hurry Love" by the Supremes	
"White Lines"	Interpolation of Stevie Wonder's 1972 performance of "(They Long to Be) Close to You" by the Carpenters	
"Circles"	Interpolation of "Huit Octobre 1971" by Cortex	
"Preacher Man"	"To You With Love" by the Moments	
"Beauty and the Beast"	"Don't Have to Shop Around" by the Mad Lads	
"Last Breath"	Interpolation of "Bésame Mama" by Poncho Sanchez	
"Losing Your Mind"	"Vitamin C" by Can	
"Losing Your Mind"	Interpolation of "Losing Your Mind" by Raury and Jaden Smith	

=== "Highs and Lows" ===
In January 2025, French singer Pomme stated on social media that she had not given West permission to sample her music on the Bully track "Highs and Lows" while also expressing disapproval towards his political views. However, legal action was not pursued. An interpolated version of "Soleil Soleil" can be heard on the intro to the Bully V1 version of the song, transitioning into the sample used.

== Cuck ==
Track	Sample	Ref
"Cousins"	"Were There Originals" by Double Virgo	
"Cousins"	Sample and interpolation of "10 Percs" by Dave Blunts	
"Cousins"	"New Tank" by Playboi Carti	
"Heil Hitler"	1935 speech by Adolf Hitler	
"Jared"	Instagram live by Justin Bieber	
"WW3"	Sample and interpolation of "I Get High (On Your Memory)" by Freda Payne	

== Other ==
=== Unreleased songs ===
Track	Sample	Ref
"A Thousand Miles" (as ¥$; Vanessa Carlton cover)	"100 Miles" by Skinbone	
"Black Skinhead" (remix)	Interpolation of "Everybody Wants to Rule the World" by Tears for Fears	
"Bulletproof"	"Bulletproof" by La Roux	
"Can't Look In My Eyes" (demo of "Too Bad I Have to Destroy You Now")	"The Son of Flynn" by Daft Punk	
"Damn" (original single version)	"Feelings (Live At Montreux)" by Nina Simone	
"Everybody" (as ¥$)	Sample and interpolation of "Everybody (Backstreet's Back)" by Backstreet Boys	
"Fall Out of Heaven"	"Hit" by Section 25	
"God Level"	"Kolumbo" by Dick Hyman	
"Highs and Lows" (Bully V1)	Sample and interpolation of "Soleil Soleil" by Pomme	
"Last Name"	"Wally Wilder" by Delicate Steve	
"Living So Italian"	"Por Ti Volaré" (Spanish version) by Andrea Bocelli	
"Mama's Boyfriend"	"Movin' Out (Anthony's Song)" by Billy Joel	
"One I Love"	"Dedicated to the One I Love" by the Mamas & the Papas	
"Perfect Bitch"	Carmina Burana by Carl Orff	
"This One Here" (Bully V1)	"Walk on the Wild Side" by Lou Reed	

=== Disputes ===
==== "Girls, Girls, Girls" (remix) ====
In March 2012, Bobby Poindexter of The Persuaders claimed that West's remix of Jay-Z's "Girls, Girls, Girls" used an uncleared sample from The Persuaders' "Trying Girls Out" (West's "Girls, Girls, Girls" (remix) had been on the unofficial mixtape Freshmen Adjustment 2.) Poindexter also claimed that West willfully knew of his copyright infringement, as "[West] had also produced a legally-licensed version of the same song for Jay-Z's album The Blueprint" earlier in 2001. The case was filed in the United States District Court for the Southern District of New York, and West was sued for $500,000. Poindexter stated, "I have offered to resolve this matter out of court with Kanye West. But in response, he has refused to even discuss any 'out-of-court' resolutions whatsoever."

Due to Poindexter's lack of legal representation, the case didn't proceed. He tried a second time later but failed for other process-related issues.

==== "Come Back Baby" ====
In 2018, during the Wyoming Sessions, West produced all of the songs on American rapper Pusha T's album Daytona. One song, "Come Back Baby" was accused of illegally sampling blues and soul musician George Jackson's "I Can't Do Without You". Naming both West and Pusha T, along with UMG Recordings, Def Jam Recordings, and GOOD Music, the case was filed by Fame Enterprises, a company that owned the rights to Jackson's song. The company charged that a non-trivial portion of Pusha T's song utilized the sample and that the song's content about "selling drugs" would not have received a cleared sample "under any circumstances."

Fame Enterprises dropped the case after six months.
