= Twosday =

Portmanteau and one-time observance

- Type: Secular
- Significance: Palindromic and ambigramic Gregorian calendar date marked by prevalence of the digit 2
- Celebrations: Mass weddings, time capsules, sales promotions
- Date: February 22, 2022
- Frequency: Every 400 years

Twosday was an unofficial one-time secular observance held on Tuesday, February 22, 2022. The name is a portmanteau of two and Tuesday, deriving from the fact that the digits of the date form a numeral palindrome marked by exclusivity or prevalence of the digit 2—when written in different numerical date formats, such as: 22/02/2022, (Note: It was preceded by seven palindromic dates in the dd-mm-yyyy format in the 21st century.) 22/2/22 and 2/22/22. (Note: with leading zeroes omitted) It is also an ambigram. (Note: The next ambigramic date in the dd-mm-yyyy format will be February 8, 2080 (08.02.2080).) (Note: If the digits are not interposed by any other symbol, i.e. if unconventionally written as 22222 (such as in the hashtag #22222), the date forms a repdigit.) In countries that apply the ISO 8601 international standard for the calendar, there is an additional congruence as Tuesday is the second day of the week under this scheme.

== Anticipation ==
The attraction to the date is due to apophenia. Twosday was described by How Stuff Works as an example of humans being conditioned under societal institutions to notice only some while ignoring other coincidences that surround them. Attraction to numerology was cited as a reason as well. According to University of Portland professor Aziz Inan, the palindrome is one of the "ubiquitous palindromes", as it retains its defining characteristics globally, despite the differences in national date formats.

In 2016, the website 22-2-22.com was created to count down to the date. Snopes wrote about Twosday in 2018, in one of its articles debunking false rumors about special dates—the claim about Twosday was rated as "True", but the concept was questioned as follows: "2/22/2022 certainly features a number of 2s, but isn’t it fudging things to use the 22nd day of a year [sic] that includes a number other than two?"

== Events ==
Prague tram party

Škoda 15T tram of the line 22, course number (7)22

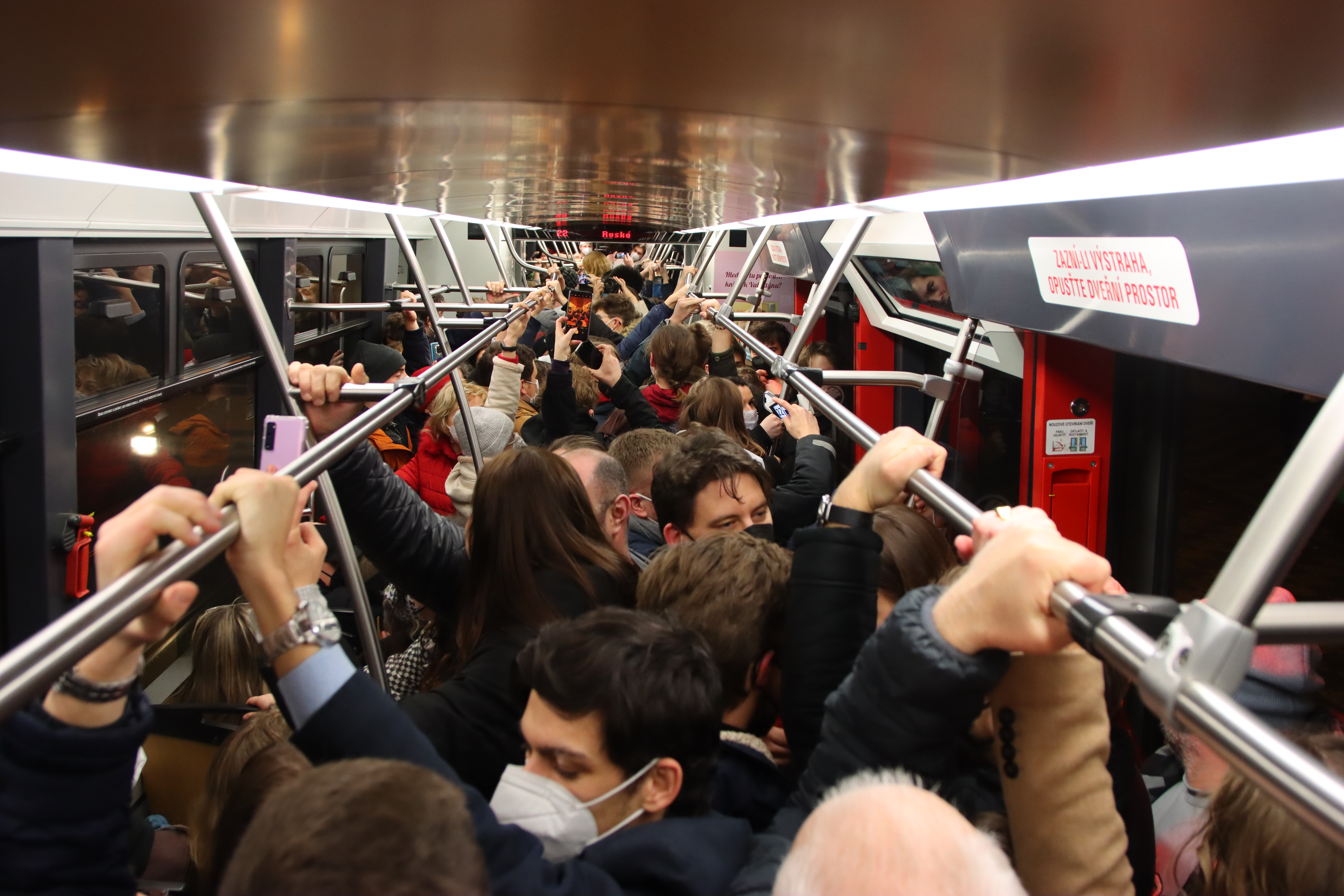
People on the tram, 22:22

The interest surrounding the date was a social media phenomenon, with the hashtag #22222 receiving 58 million views on TikTok. Google marked the date with an Easter egg.

Twosday was marked by festivities in several cities. In Prague, a parodical party was organized on the tram line 22 at 22:22 (10:22 pm). In Dubai, United Arab Emirates, the Museum of the Future was officially opened to commemorate the palindrome date. In schools around the United States, children buried time capsules, often set to open on March 3, 2033 (3/3/33) which be known as "Threesday" as by then the then elementary students would likely be high school seniors by then, and did other activities themed on the number two.

Many people chose the date for their weddings. In Sacramento, California, 222 couples were married, in a collective wedding at the California State Capitol. In Las Vegas, Nevada, weddings were performed at the Harry Reid International Airport. It was suggested that the number of weddings may have broken the record for the most weddings in a single day in Clark County, Nevada. In Singapore, 500 couples were scheduled to be wedded, nine times more than the usual.

Various businesses engaged in Twosday-specific sales promotions. An American food holiday "National Margarita Day" coincided with Twosday, and various thematic activities relating to Twosday took place, mostly in the form of sales promotions (such as 22% discounts). The Korean girl group Nmixx made its debut on 2022/02/22. Kanye West held a listening party for Donda 2, his eleventh studio album, on this date, and intended to release it on the same date; it was later slightly delayed and released on 2022/02/23, exclusively on Kano Computing's Stem Player.

Babies being born at 2:22 am or 2:22 pm on this date created some media interest, with multiple news outlets running stories about such occurrences; for example:

- A boy was born in the St John of God Murdoch Hospital in Perth, Australia at 2:22:22 am.
- A girl was born in room no. 2 of the Alamance Regional Medical Center at Burlington, North Carolina on Twosday, at 2:22 am. Her mother had earlier been diagnosed with Hodgkin's lymphoma, and was told by doctors that she could not have children. She named her daughter Judah "because it means praise — just praising God for giving us our heart’s desires".
- A boy was born in the Timpanogos Regional Hospital in Orem, Utah, at 2:22 am. His parents had expected him to be born on February 20.
- Twin sisters were born in the Mercy Hospital in the New York metropolitan area at 2:20 am and 2:22 am.
- A boy was born in the Mercy Hospital in the New York metropolitan area at 2:22 pm.
- A boy was born at the Good Samaritan Hospital in Cincinnati, Ohio at 2:22 pm, in room no. 2.

Late-night talk show hosts Stephen Colbert, Jimmy Kimmel, and Jimmy Fallon made references to Twosday in their programmes. Jimmy Kimmel Live! featured a Twosday-themed introductory sing-and-dance segment (calling the show "your second favorite show"), while Colbert conversed with a 2-shaped puppet.

== Other Twosdays ==
The subsequent Twosday in the United States date notation (i.e. another 2/22/22 that falls on a Tuesday) is February 22, 2422. In a year that ends with 22 (which could be 2122, 2222, (Note: February 22, 2222, will be a Friday) etc.), that is the first subsequent occurrence of February 22 being on a Tuesday, per the 400-year Gregorian calendar cycle. In relation to Twosday, Thursday, March 3, 2033 (3/3/33) was named "Threesday" or "Thirdsday". It is not palindromic in the eight-digit format. The later date of March 3, 3033 will be a Sunday.

== See also ==
- 11/11/11, another common name for the Great Blue Norther of November 11, 1911 (natural disaster)
- Doomsday method, and its mnemonic weekday names, which include "Twosday", as an earlier instance of this portmanteau
- Framing (social sciences)
- Repdigit
