= Security (song) =

Song by Kanye West

from the album Donda 2
- Released: February 23, 2022 (Stem Player); April 29, 2025 (streaming)
- Recorded: 2022; 2025
- Studio: Soho Warehouse (Los Angeles); House of Hits (Miami)
- Genre: Hip-hop; electronic
- Length: 2:18
- Label: YZY
- Songwriters: Kanye West; Mica Levi; Nasir Pemberton; Lenny Wee; Jonathan Kirk; Justin Laboy; Yakki Davis
- Producers: Kanye West; Digital Nas; Lenny Wee

"Security" is a song by American rapper Kanye West from his eleventh studio album, Donda 2 (2022). It was originally released through West's Stem Player device on February 3, 2022, later being added to music streaming services alongside the album on April 29, 2025. The track was written by West, Digital Nas, Lenny Wee, DaBaby, Justin Laboy, and PopLord, being produced by the former three. Its production features distorted synths and flutes that are sampled from "Wanna Trap" by Mica Levi, who received a writing credit for the use of their work. Lyrically, the song is a diss track towards comedian Pete Davidson, who was dating West's ex-wife Kim Kardashian in 2022. West threatens to fight him as a response to Davidson hiring personal security guards, and opens with a remark speculated to be aimed at former collaborator Kid Cudi.

West debuted "Security" at a listening event for Donda 2 on February 22, 2022, held at LoanDepot Park in Miami. It was one of four tracks added to the Stem Player the next day, alongside "Broken Road", "Pablo", and "We Did It Kid". The song received mixed reviews from music critics, who often criticized it as antagonizing and musically unfinished. On streaming services, "Security" initially contained a sampled monologue from media personality DJ Akademiks as an intro, where he characterizes Kardashian and her mother as heathens who are attempting to corrupt West's children.

== Background ==
In an interview with Complex on January 3, 2022, Victor Victor Worldwide CEO Steven Victor exclusively told the magazine that West had begun working on Donda 2 as a sequel to his tenth studio album, Donda (2021), later telling them it was "coming sooner than you think". During recording for the album, West seemingly took inspiration for "Security" from an altercation between him and ex-wife Kim Kardashian's personal security, who he alleged refused him access to her home despite his daughter's wishes in an interview with Hollywood Unlocked. West stated he was unaware of these restrictions and had not discussed them with Kardashian, remarking that, "I am the richest Black man and North's father, right, and the security was able to stop me from going into the room with my daughter and that had not been defined." This event is referenced in the song's lyrics, where West tells the security to "never stand between a man and his kids."

== Composition and lyrics ==
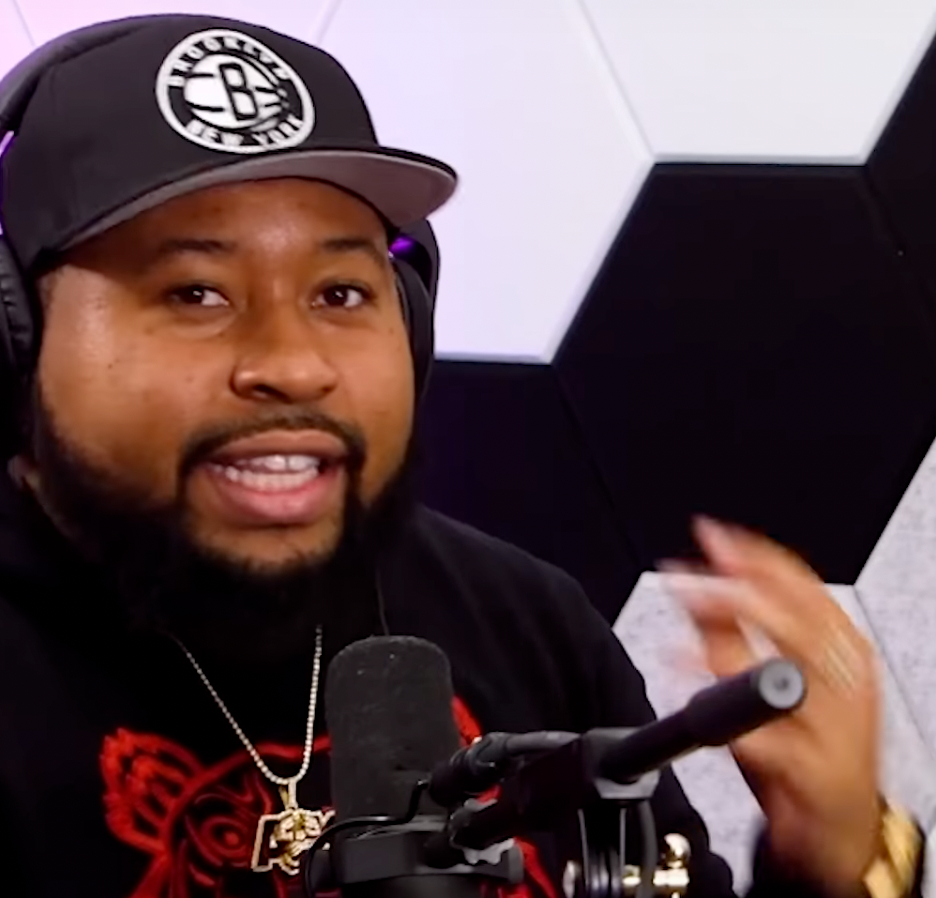
DJ Akademiks (pictured in 2022) was featured on the streaming version of "Security".

Musically, "Security" consists of aggressive, distorted synths and flutes, which are derived from a looped and sped-up sample of "Wanna Trap" by Mica Levi, as featured on the soundtrack to the 2021 black comedy film Zola. Critics often compared its production to West's 2013 album Yeezus, citing how the loop was edited to add distortion. West opens the song by declaring that "you can't be on my mama album", being the only time his mother is invoked on Donda 2. Ryan Akler-Bishop of Our Culture Mag viewed this line as a diss towards Kid Cudi, noting that West had previously condemned Cudi for his friendship with Pete Davidson. The rest of the track is aimed at Davidson, with West threatening to put the comedian's "security at risk" after he and Kardashian, who were dating, hired security guards as a response to West's online posts. West mocks their decision to hire extra security, saying that he can easily avoid them and will not get "frisked" when entering Kardashian's home.

When first released onto music streaming services, "Security" contained a spoken intro by American media personality DJ Akademiks, sampled from a livestream he did the night before. In his monologue, DJ Akademiks demonizes Kardashian and her mother, Kris Jenner, as "white heathens" who are corrupting the "innocent souls" of West's children by involving them "in all types of demonic debauchery".

== Release and reception ==
"Security" was released for the Stem Player on February 23, 2022, following the "Kanye West: Donda Experience Performance" listening party held at LoanDepot Park in Miami the previous day. It was uploaded alongside the songs "Broken Road", "Pablo", and "We Did It Kid", with Donda 2's remaining tracks made available on February 24 through an update labeled "V2.22.22 Miami". Three years later on April 29, 2025, the song was uploaded to Spotify and YouTube Music alongside a new version of the album, appearing on other streaming platforms within the coming hours.

Upon its listening party preview and Stem Player release, "Security" received negative reception from music critics. Writing for The Guardian, Alexis Petridis compared West's attitude towards Davidson on the song to a bully, calling it "unedifying" and remarking that "you can hear something similar in any number of pub car parks after closing time without needing to buy the £200 Stem Player". In a staff review of the first four released songs from Complex, Erick Skelton called its lyrics "sad and uncomfortable to consume as a fan", saying that although he "understand[s] the value of channeling life's tragedies to make art," he would rather skip the track entirely. Fellow writer Jessica McKinney opined it "just isn't a good song at all", feeling that it was the most unfinished of the four reviewed tracks.

== Personnel ==
Credits adapted from ASCAP.

- Kanye West – lead vocals, production, songwriter
- Digital Nas – production, songwriter
- Lenny Wee – production, songwriter, arranger
- Mica Levi – songwriter
- DaBaby – songwriter
- Justin Laboy – songwriter
- PopLord – songwriter
