= DeAndre Maiden =

American music manager and executive producer

DeAndre "Free" Maiden is an American music manager and executive producer. He is the former manager of Kanye West.

Maiden discovered West early in his career and helped guide him in the music industry. He ran his record label and publishing company.

In 2022, Maiden was nominated for an Emmy for Outstanding Documentary or Nonfiction Series for Jeen-Yuhs: A Kanye Trilogy.

In April 2025, Maiden claimed West has not paid his producers for their work on West's album Donda 2.
