= Louie Bags =

Song by Kanye West featuring Jack Harlow

from the album Donda 2
- Released: February 24, 2022
- Recorded: January–February 2022; May 2025
- Genre: Trap
- Length: 5:05
- Label: YZY
- Songwriters: Kanye West; Jackman Harlow
- Producers: ATL Jacob; Digital Nas; Gavin Hadley; JW Lucas; Kid Krono

"Louie Bags" is a song by American rapper Kanye West from his eleventh studio album, Donda 2 (2022). It features a verse from American rapper Jack Harlow, who West had previously co-signed. First released on the Stem Player on February 24, 2022, the song was re-released on April 29, 2025, along with most songs from the album. The track was written by West alongside Harlow, being produced by ATL Jacob, Digital Nas, Gavin Hadley, JW Lucas, and Kid Krono.

Over an electronic trap beat, West mourns his friend and late fashion designer Virgil Abloh. An extended version of Harlow's verse surfaced online in October 2023, and made headlines due to a line about American rapper Lil Nas X. "Louie Bags" received mixed reviews from music critics, who praised it for its catchiness and theme while criticizing its unfinished state.

== Background ==
In an interview with The New York Times, producer Kid Krono recounted how he became involved in the production of "Louie Bags". According to him, he had previously messaged co-producer JW Lucas, who took interest in his style and asked for melodies to use for a West song. Kid Krono was unaware of his contributions making the final song until he watched the listening party for Donda 2, retrospectively stating that "About an hour into the livestream, I started hearing my melody being played out loud [...] It was absolutely one of the most amazing experiences I've ever had."

An extended version of "Louie Bags" leaked in October 2023. This version was presumably made before the song's release, as alongside a longer verse from Harlow, it features a reference track done by American rapper The Game. Harlow's verse went viral due to the line "I bet Lil Nas X will fuck me if I let him," which was interpreted as a reference to his guest appearance on Lil Nas X's song "Industry Baby" (2021), which featured production from West. Devon Jefferson of AllHipHop was unsure if Harlow's line was serious, as although it could be "just trolling", "it's not like Harlow hasn't shown us all his zesty side before."

In February 2022, West endorsed Jack Harlow by an Instagram post, praising his rapping ability. Harlow called the comment "one of the greatest moments of [his] entire life." The track premiered during the LoanDepot Park, Miami listening event for Donda 2, where Harlow made a guest appearance.

== Composition and lyrics ==
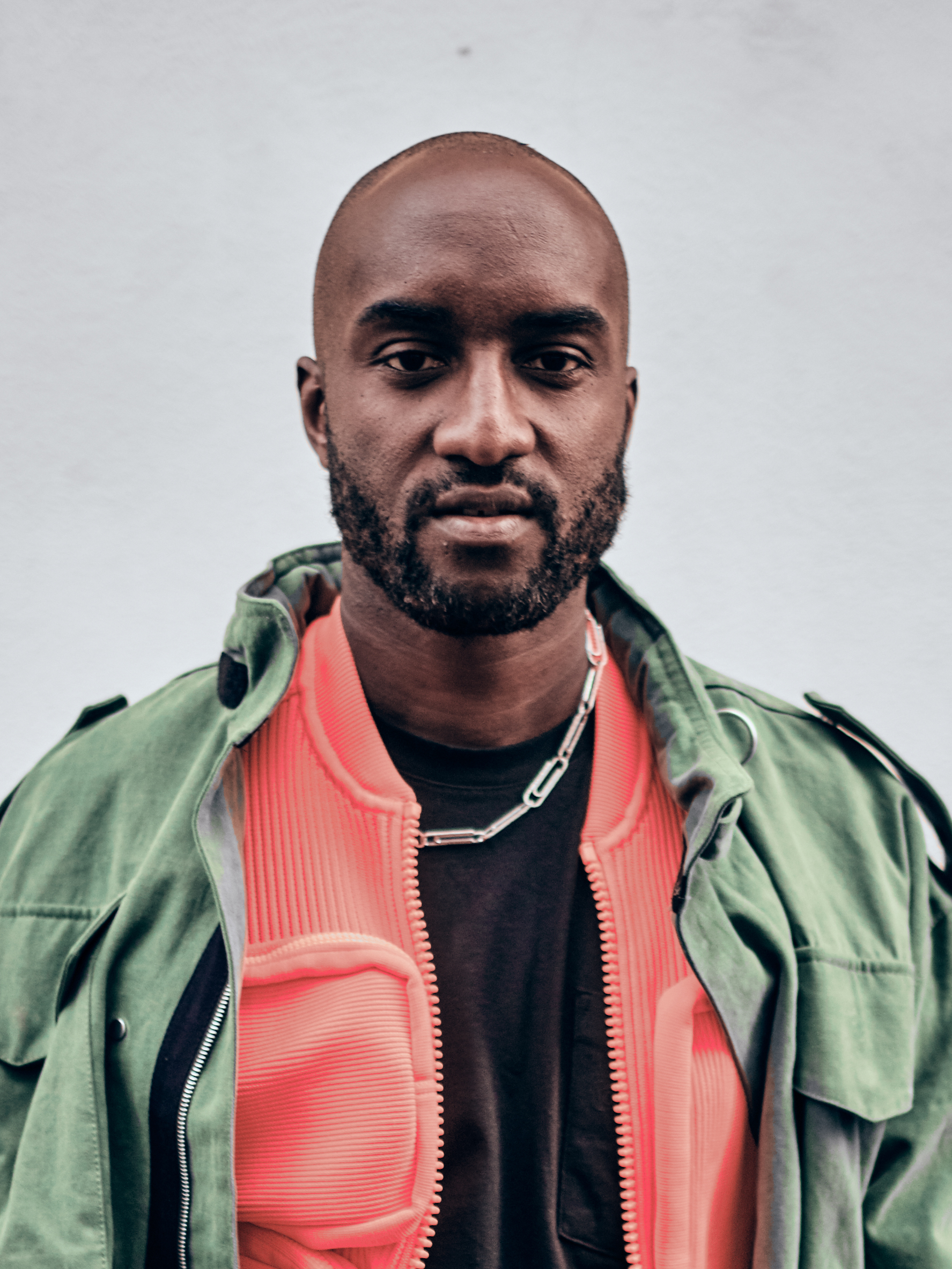
"Louie Bags" is dedicated to Virgil Abloh, whom West heavily worked with in his business ventures.

"Louie Bags" is a hip-hop song dedicated to the late fashion designer Virgil Abloh. It opens with a sample of Kamala Harris's "We did it, Joe" phone call to Joe Biden. Lyrically, West claims he will further himself from Louis Vuitton, repeating "I stopped buying Louis bags after Virgil passed" in the chorus. West also addresses rumors that he might take over Abloh's job at Louis Vuitton following his death by rapping, "We ain't doin' business, it won't be no business." In Harlow's verse, he recalls an experience with his cousins, which Vulture noted as influenced by West.

The track's production incorporates a synth loop, featuring an electronic sound. Pitchfork described the instrumental as 'thumping", while Financial Times noted its low-frequency buzzing noises.

== Release and reception ==
"Louie Bags" was released on February 24, 2022, with a patch that added 12 extra Donda 2 songs to the Stem Player. The track's debut on streaming came three years later when an updated version of the album was uploaded to Spotify and YouTube Music on April 29, 2025.

"Louie Bags" received mixed reception from music critics. Jeff Ihaza of Rolling Stone praised the song, writing that it "has the feeling of a genuine earworm." Grant Rindner of GQ noted the song's dedication to Virgil Abloh as a highlight of Donda 2. Alexis Petridis of The Guardian felt that the track had potential to be better, citing the unfinished vocals. Paul Attard of Slant Magazine criticized West's performance on the song as "a babbled, repetitive non-verse," claiming that Harlow "effortlessly raps circles around [West]." In a review of the V2.22.22 Miami version of Donda 2, Pitchfork's Alphonse Pierre similarly criticized West's delivery, deeming the track "the most disappointing track on the album."

== Personnel ==
Credits are adapted from Kid Krono's Instagram and Complex.

- Kanye West – lead vocals, songwriter
- Jack Harlow – lead vocals, songwriter
- ATL Jacob – production
- Digital Nas – production
- Gavin Hadley – production
- JW Lucas – production
- Kid Krono – production
