= Donda 2 =

Studio album by Kanye West
- Released: February 23, 2022; April 29, 2025 (re-release)
- Recorded: December 2021–February 2022; April–May 2025 (re-release)
- Studios: Soho Warehouse (Los Angeles); House of Hits (Miami)
- Genres: Hip-hop; R&B; trap; drill
- Length: 47:22 (Stem Player); 58:34 (streaming)
- Label: YZY
- Producers: Ye; Aaron Paris; AllDay; ATL Jacob; AyoAA; Beach House; Big Duke; BoogzDaBeast; Bordeaux; Cash Jones; Cashmere Brown; Cvre; Dem Jointz; Digital Nas; DJ Premier; FnZ; Foreign Vu; Gavin Hadley; Hemz; Hit-Boy; Jahaan Sweet; John Cunningham; JW Lucas; Kid Krono; Leonardo Dessi; Lil Mav; Luca Polizzi; Manny Laurenko; Marilyn Manson; Mike Dean; Non Native; Ojivolta; Prodysgroup; Qua Xo; Ryan Svendsen; Sean Leon; Scoop; Scott Bridgeway; Sneako; the Chainsmokers; Theophilus London; Tom Levesque; Tommy Rush; Tweek Tune; Twisco; Wheezy

Kanye West chronology
Donda (2021)	Donda 2 (2022)	Vultures 1 (2024)

Singles from Donda 2
- 1. "Eazy" Released: January 16, 2022; 2. "City of Gods" Released: February 11, 2022; 3. "True Love" Released: May 27, 2022; 4. "Burn Everything" Released: November 18, 2022

Donda 2 (stylized in all caps) is the eleventh studio album by the American rapper Kanye West. It has also been described as a demo album, as it was initially released in an unfinished state on Kano Computing's Stem Player on February 23, 2022, with more songs added in an update. On April 29, 2025, West independently released Donda 2 on music streaming services via his YZY record label, with a different tracklist and updated production. Guest appearances include XXXTentacion, Don Toliver, Baby Keem, Migos, Travis Scott, Future, Jack Harlow, Sean Leon, Vory, Fivio Foreign, Alicia Keys, Soulja Boy, the Game, and Playboi Carti.

West began recording Donda 2 in early January 2022, producing it alongside Beach House, the Chainsmokers, Dem Jointz, Digital Nas, DJ Premier, Hit-Boy, Mike Dean, Sean Leon, Theophilus London, and Wheezy, among others, with Future serving as the executive producer. Although West recorded hundreds of songs during the production of Donda (2021), none of Donda 2's songs came from the Donda sessions. Donda 2 is a hip-hop album with R&B and trap elements. Lyrically, it explores West's anger and sadness stemming from his divorce from Kim Kardashian, and he directs insults towards Kardashian's then-boyfriend Pete Davidson. Multiple music critics described its sound as unfinished, and many of West's lyrics are unintelligible.

Donda 2's release was preceded by the singles "Eazy" and "City of Gods", released in January and February 2022 respectively—both of which peaked within the top 50 of the US Billboard Hot 100. West held "Kanye West: Donda Experience Performance", an accompanying listening party at LoanDepot Park in Miami, Florida on February 22, 2022, selling out 47 IMAX theaters across the United States; the event was plagued by technical failures. Donda 2 received mixed reviews, with criticism for its subject matter, song structures, lack of focus, and West's lyricism, though the production received some praise. It is generally considered one of West's worst albums. Due to its initial Stem Player exclusivity, Donda 2 was heavily pirated. Donda 2 did not chart on any known record charts; Billboard deemed it ineligible for its charts due to product bundling rules.

West was expected to update and finish the Stem Player release within a matter of months, but it received no major updates after February 2022. After West made a series of antisemitic statements in late 2022, Kano dissociated from him and discontinued the Stem Player. Numerous songs in a further state of completeness surfaced online through leaks, while others were reworked and released by other artists. In March 2025, West announced that he was returning to Donda 2. Digital Nas, who executive produced the streaming release, livestreamed his progress updating it throughout April, and West released it on streaming services on April 29.

== Background and recording ==
In an interview with Complex on January 3, 2022, Victor Victor Worldwide CEO Steven Victor exclusively told the website that West had begun working on a sequel to his tenth studio album Donda (2021), entitled Donda 2. Victor later told the magazine that it was "coming sooner than you think", explaining: "The procession is starting and it's not stopping." On January 27, 2022, West captioned an Instagram photo of his childhood home in flames with a date of February 22 along with the title Donda 2, also mentioning fellow rapper Future will serve the role of executive producer. He had worked with Future in the past, featuring on his single "I Won" (2014). Most publications took this as an announcement of the album's release date, though it went unreleased on the date. Producer BoogzDaBeast revealed that even though hundreds of songs were recorded during the sessions for the first Donda album, the tracks recorded for Donda 2 were all new songs made after the announcement of the Donda 2 listening event.

Producer Digital Nas revealed that for Donda 2, West instructed him to make the songs sound "more monk-like" and to "simplify the tracks", and if they are "not able to be played at a funeral, childbirth, graduation, a wedding", then inclusion on the album is not appropriate. In late January 2022, the producer stated that singer Marilyn Manson was recording for Donda 2 daily in the studio. Manson had previously contributed to Donda and for the sequel, Digital Nas opened up that West did not want the singer to "play rap beats", desiring for him "to play what he makes" and then West would work on parts of his work. Digital Nas compared the creative process to that of West's sixth studio album Yeezus (2013), also saying that some of the producers who contributed to the album were working on Donda 2.

== Music and themes ==
Donda 2 is a hip-hop album. The album was described in multiple reviews as seeming unfinished, with Alphonse Pierre of Pitchfork viewing it as an "undercooked" album posing as an "ever-changing art piece" that may remain incomplete. A production style that incorporates "see-sawing synth patterns" was observed by The Guardian journalist Alexis Petridis in his review of the album, who also commented that there is a lack of focus, seeing certain songs as resembling demos. According to HipHopDX writer Matthew Ritchie, large stretches of the production demonstrate West's "attention to detail" that creates a background for songs.

West delves into relationship problems between himself and Kim Kardashian on Donda 2, particularly discussing their divorce. Thematically, this topic drew comparisons to West's fourth studio album 808s & Heartbreak (2008) from numerous writers. He goes into detail about the divorce, focusing on his many emotions and insecurities. West directs insults towards comedian Pete Davidson, who became Kardashian's new partner. West also addresses his family's concerns, disregarding them. He conveys a bitter and self-pitying outlook, seeking the sympathy of others, while showing a lack of both happiness and empathy.

== Songs ==
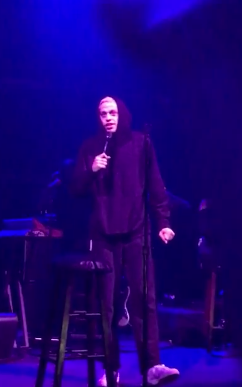
West antagonizes American comedian Pete Davidson, who began dating Kardashian during her divorce from West, on the songs "Security" and "Eazy".

The album's opening track, "True Love", contains a drum break shared with West's 2010 single "Runaway" that samples "The Basement" by Pete Rock & CL Smooth. A posthumous feature from rapper XXXTentacion is included at the beginning, singing about lost love. On the track, West laments the childcare arrangements brought about in the wake of his divorce. West also references XXXTentacion's son Gekyume during the second chorus, as he reminds both his and the late rapper's children of their respective fathers' love for them. "Broken Road" is a ballad featuring rapper Don Toliver, in which West delivers introspection and declares his freedom. "Get Lost" sees West singing a cappella with Auto-Tune heavily applied to his voice, recalling varying memories of his marriage to Kardashian. "Too Easy" features electronic elements and contains a mantra by West, who uses the vocal technique as he champions self love. The rapper references his then-budding relationship with actress Julia Fox on "Flowers" and alludes to both his birthday gift for her and his Valentine's Day present for his ex-wife Kim Kardashian. West angrily threatens to fight Davidson on the noisy and aggressive track "Security", proclaiming that he "ain't got enough security for this".

"We Did It Kid" includes guest vocals from Baby Keem and the Migos and features lyrics about friendship over a brass trap beat. "Pablo" is an energetic track with a fast-moving beat and a hook from fellow rapper Travis Scott, while Future also contributes a verse. The 2025 release of "Pablo" has a verse from West that is made with AI. "Louie Bags" is a tribute to designer Virgil Abloh, a longtime friend of West's. West states on the minimally-produced electronic-backed track that he stopped buying Abloh's Louis Vuitton bags after his death in 2021. The track ends with a verse performed by Jack Harlow. "Happy" opens with a verse from Future, preceding three AI verses from West, who conveys his sadness as he repeatedly pleads: "Do I look happy to you?" "Sci Fi" features lush orchestral production and begins with a monologue from Kardashian's 2021 appearance on Saturday Night Live, in which she applauds West's achievements. Lyrically, West tells the story of their divorce and hearing actor Morgan Freeman's voice whilst having intercourse. "Selfish" is a minimal ballad that posthumously features XXXTentacion, with West analyzing how his flaws led to the divorce. Selfish was removed from the 2025 streaming release. "Lord Lift Me Up" has an orchestral style and consists solely of vocals from Vory. "City of Gods" is a Brooklyn drill styled track serves as an ode to New York City from West, fellow rapper Fivio Foreign, and singer Alicia Keys. "First Time in a Long Time" embraces new beginnings and features a guest verse from Soulja Boy. On West and fellow rapper the Game's collaboration "Eazy", the former disses Davidson, threatening to "beat [his] ass."

== Promotion and release ==
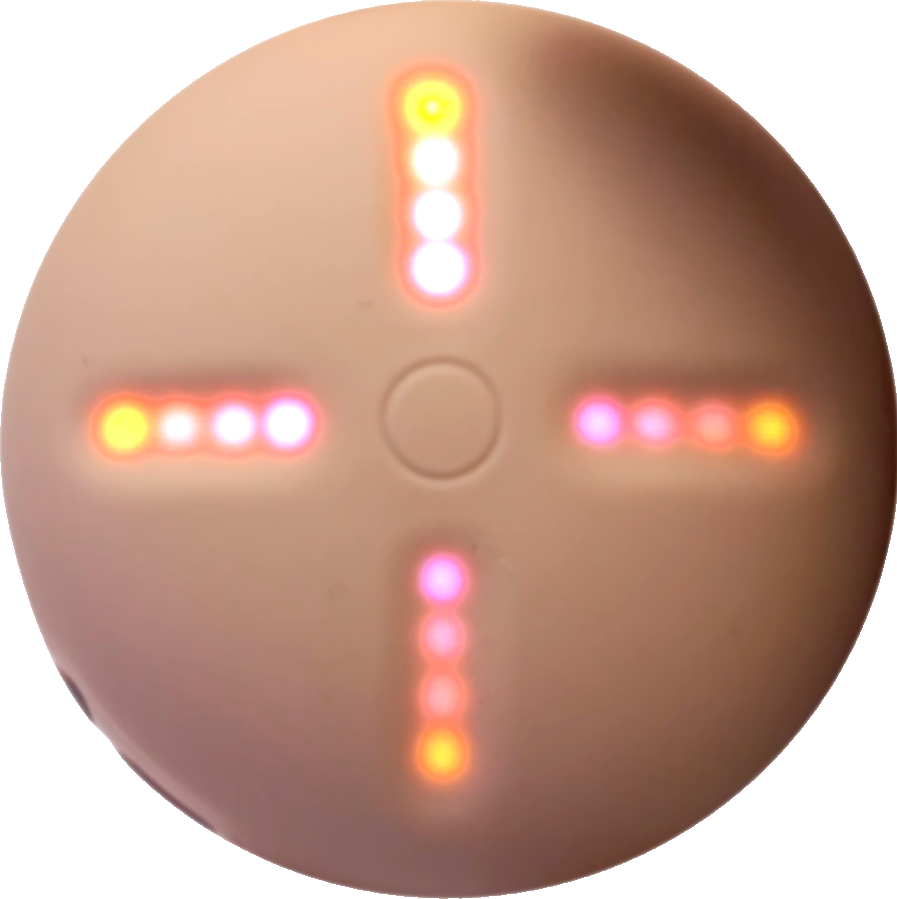
Donda 2 was initially released exclusively on the Stem Player (pictured) in 2022.

On January 15, 2022, "Eazy" was made available as a Spotify exclusive, one day before it was released as the first single from Donda 2. The song entered the US Billboard Hot 100 at number 49, alongside peaking at number 32 on the UK Singles Chart. A music video for "Eazy" was released on March 3, 2022, featuring West kidnapping a clay-version of Pete Davidson that he goes on to bury. On February 11, "City of Gods" was released as the second single from the album. The song charted at number 46 on the Hot 100, while it reached number 58 on the UK Singles Chart. On May 27, 2022, the song "True Love" was officially released on streaming services. It was also included on XXXTentacion's "Look At Me: The Album". The song peaked on the Billboard Hot 100 upon its debut at number 22, and on the Hot Hip-Hop/R&B chart at number 5. On March 8, 2022, alongside an update to the Stem Player website that allowed users who had purchased the Stem Player to stream songs from Donda 2 without having to connect their Stem Player devices to their computers (thereby allowing music to be streamed from the site like a traditional music streaming service), the songs "Pablo" and "Security" were made available to stream for all (even those without a Stem Player), likely as additional singles for Donda 2, with these versions having updated mixes.

On February 17, 2022, West announced that Donda 2 will not be available on any commercial streaming services and will be exclusive to his Stem Player audio device, priced at US$200, which was previously released with Donda. He explained that his motive is how artists "get just 12% of the money the industry makes" when their music is available on the platforms, calling for a time for freedom from "this oppressive system". According to West, he made around $2.2 million from purchases of the Stem Player within 24 hours of the announcement, having sold over 8,000 copies. However, West making the album only available on the device led to criticism from his fans. As a result of the rapper's decision, Apple reportedly pulled their $2 million sponsorship deal with him, as they were scheduled to stream the accompanying concert. In a series of Instagram posts, West declared that he had turned down a $100 million deal with the company.

A total of 22 songs were announced via a track list for Donda 2 posted by West to his Instagram account on February 18, 2022. On February 23, four songs, entitled "Security", "Pablo", "Broken Road", and "We Did It Kid", were released to owners of the Stem Player via the player's website. Another 12 songs were added the following day as part of an update labeled "V2.22.22 Miami". However, one of the 12 additional songs released, entitled "Keep It Burning", was removed from the Stem Player website and replaced with a stadium version of "True Love", which was then later replaced with "Eazy". A finished version of the song, "Keep It Burnin", would instead later be released on Future's album I Never Liked You. The first batch of songs that were played at the Miami listening event on February 22, 2022–which were added to the device on February 24–contained half-mumbled reference tracks and incomplete songs; West continued finishing the album during February. The co-inventor of the Stem Player tweeted that official Donda 2 songs are available and always updated via the device, adding that "anywhere else, you're not getting the vision or the latest versions", insinuating that West planned to update the album as he had done previously with The Life of Pablo and Donda in 2016 and 2021, respectively.

Donda 2 leaked online shortly after release and was heavily pirated. The album was one of the most pirated albums on 1337x and the Pirate Bay in February 2022. It also led to the piracy of the Stem Player website, since the song stems and remixing tools were available on emulators. Donda 2 was not eligible to enter any Billboard charts per the rules on releases sold with merchandise, as it was exclusive to the Stem Player service. During his performance at Rolling Loud music festival in July 2022, Digital Nas suggested that a finished version of the album would be released later that year. The mini-documentary Last Week, posted to West's YouTube channel in October 2022, featured updated snippets of the songs "530", "First Time in a Long Time", "Sci-Fi", and "Happy". In January 2023, in light of West's antisemitic remarks, Kano Computing, the manufacturer of the Stem Player, announced that their collaboration with West has ended, and that the Donda Stem Player would be discontinued after they sold through the remaining stock of 5,000 units. At the same time, Kano announced a new variant of the Stem Player developed in collaboration with Ghostface Killah that would not include Donda 2 or any other content from West.

=== Events ===
On February 7, 2022, a private listening party was held for Donda 2 at Nobu Malibu, where Travis Scott and fellow rappers Offset, French Montana, Yung Lean, and Drake, as well as model Kendall Jenner, were in attendance. Six days later, West announced a public concert entitled "Kanye West: Donda Experience Performance" for the album at LoanDepot Park in Miami on February 22. Tickets for the concert were first made available on February 14, 2022, six days before ones for IMAX presentations went on sale. On February 21, 2022, it was announced that the concert would be live-streamed in IMAX theaters across 15 cities in the United States at 9p.m. ET. In response to popular demand, IMAX subsequently expanded the live-stream to 60 theaters across the US for the one-night only event on February 22. Simultaneously with the screening, the event was live-streamed on YouTube and West's Stem Player service. It sold out 47 of the 60 theaters, grossing around $313,582 for IMAX. The performance was set to begin at 8p.m. ET, though started nearly 3 hours late at 10:45 p.m. West was joined by numerous guests, such as Marilyn Manson and DaBaby–both of whom appeared at the third listening event for Donda–as well as Fivio Foreign, Keys, and Jack Harlow. Celebrities in attendance included French Montana, Elon Musk, and Diddy. West experienced multiple microphone problems and audio glitches while performing, to which he reacted during a performance of "Jail pt 2" by throwing his microphone on the floor. The rapper later revealed to Sasha A. Berg and Esther Coco Berg that he had been made "to write the word 'performance'" in the event's title, despite intending the event as a work of performance art. His frustration with this reduction of the event's concept led alongside other reactions to him throwing the microphone he was given, saying he began questioning why he was performing.

=== 2025 re-release ===
In March 2025, after releasing an in-progress version of his studio album Bully, West announced on Twitter that he intended to return to Donda 2 when he finished Bully. He released an image that HotNewHipHop wrote appeared to be the album's cover. Throughout April 2025, record producer Digital Nas began streaming, first on Twitch and posteriorly on Kick, alongside West, working on the rapper's unreleased album Cuck and reworking Donda 2. Various personalities were featured on these streams, including rapper and singer Dave Blunts, Rumble live-streamer Sneako and far-right political commentator Nick Fuentes. The album was published to Spotify and YouTube Music on April 29, 2025, with the album appearing on other platforms within the coming hours.

== Lawsuits ==
On June 29, 2022, West was sued by Ultra International Music Publishing over unauthorized samples of the song "Move Your Body" by Marshall Jefferson on the track "Flowers". In a motion filed at the Southern District of New York, Ultra International Music Publishing claimed that, "During discussions with representatives for Mr. Jefferson and UIMP, West and his representatives acknowledged that 'Move Your Body' was sampled in 'Flowers,' and was done so without authorization or payment to UIMP or Marshall Jefferson. Despite this acknowledgement, West has not ceased distribution of 'Flowers.'" In a comment provided to Music Business Worldwide, Jefferson stated "I've been sampled thousands of times. For that reason I've never and will never sample another artist, because I know the feelings involved." Both the monetization of the Stem Player and the use of "Flowers" in promotional material for the product were cited as profit made through the sample. The lawsuit was settled on May 3, 2023. Despite this, the 2025 re-release of Donda 2 added the sampled portions of "Move Your Body" back to the song, which were later removed in 2026.

On April 30, 2025, West was threatened with legal action by former manager DeAndre "Free" Maiden, who represented Donda 2 producers BoogzDaBeast and Brian "AllDay" Miller, under accusations that West had failed to compensate them for both released and unreleased work. West responded by claiming that Maiden was trying to "extort" him with a $3 million settlement for "beats from people I showed how to make beats to," and was attempting to remove Donda 2 from streaming. In a response, Maiden stated "I've purposely kept our dispute quiet, I believe in keeping family business family business." He ended his statement with "This man has been stealing for years, but I always protected him. I've saved Ye nine figures in attempted lawsuits alone in the past. Gloves off now." West has since attempted to reconcile with the producers, posting to Twitter, "Really wanna work with Brian and Boogz again. Really wanna work this out."

== Critical reception ==
Professional ratings
Aggregate scores
Source	Rating
Metacritic	48/100
Review scores
Source	Rating
AllMusic	2/5 stars
The Daily Telegraph	2/5 stars
Exclaim!	5/10
Financial Times	2/5 stars
The Guardian	2/5 stars
HipHopDX	3.4/5
The Line of Best Fit	4/10
Our Culture Mag	1.5/5 stars
Pitchfork	4.3/10
Slant Magazine	2.5/5 stars
The Times	1/5 stars

According to the review aggregator Metacritic, Donda 2 (V2.22.22 Miami) received "mixed or average reviews" based on a weighted average score of 48 out of 100 from 6 critic scores. Jeff Ihaza of Rolling Stone called the album a "confounding" project that is brought down by West's fixation on "controlling one's narrative", deriding the lyrical content, guest appearances, and the lack of a clear concept, despite praising certain vocals. Slate's Jack Hamilton wrote off its "aimless" song structures and "fake-deep" lyricism, also feeling let down by the "half-hearted" production that has its best-inspired moments "drowned in a sea of repetitive, spaced-out bloat". Ludovic Hunter-Tilney, writing in the Financial Times, found Donda 2 "repetitious and lacklustre", disclosing "serious deficiencies" in West's creativity, but picked "Security" as a highlight. Reviewing the album for The Guardian, Alexis Petridis disapproved of its lack of thematic focus, unfinished production and the lyrical content for its "tedious barbs at his estranged wife", but admitted some portions briefly showed "the authentically brilliant producer" West is capable of being.

The Daily Telegraph critic Neil McCormick regarded Donda 2 as the weakest album of West's career, seeing West assume a "sullen, self-pitying and bitter" persona—"vindictive sniping and whiney self-pity". McCormick criticized the album's song structures and repetitive rhymes, as well as the auto-tuned vocals, even though he liked some of the accompanying beats. Underscoring its "sluggish" energy and "undermining" production, Steven Loftin from The Line of Best Fit felt the album is "nothing particularly revelatory", discussing the expected, repetitive themes, though moderately gave credit to the production. Pitchfork's Alphonse Pierre defined Donda 2 as a "crudely unfinished dump of songs" camouflaged by the Stem Player's technological spectacle. He described the songs as "lackluster" and "undercooked", displaying "a cool moment or two" but mostly amorphous.

Few reviews were marginally favorable. Alexandra Pauly of Highsnobiety wrote lukewarm comments, describing the album as a divorce record that "boasts all the hallmarks" of an artist experiencing "post-nuptial proceedings". Pauly was dissatisfied with how Donda 2 lacks the sincerity exuded by other divorce albums, saying it "reeks of [the] ego" that appeals to West's fan base. Ritchie of HipHopDX opined that West's hyper-focus on his current drama has resulted in Donda 2, "a double-edged sword"—musically cohesive but with underdeveloped ideas.

Reviewing the 2025 release, Paul Attard of Slant Magazine wrote that while West's talent was sometimes evident, "Happy" was the "one truly great song ... play[ing] like a bad-decision anthem for the ages". He found Donda 2 still largely the same as the Stem Player release and said the new songs did not substantially change the album.

== Commercial performance ==
Donda 2 was not eligible for entry on the Billboard charts, such as the Billboard 200, since "it is not available apart from the purchase of one of [West's] $200-plus Stem Player devices." Billboard asserted on March 4, 2022, that attaching a new album to a physical device counts as "bundling"—a practice the organization deemed invalid in 2020 and implemented a rule to disregard such tactics from being counted as record sales. West celebrated the album's expulsion from the charts via his Instagram account, writing "Big win for the kid. We can no longer be counted or judged. We make my own systems. We set our own value aaaand [sic] yesterday's price is not today's price baaaaabeeeee [sic] !!!!!".

Stem Player sales within the first 24 hours of the album's release have been estimated at 11,000 units, which would place the album's gross revenue at $2.2 million. West claimed that the total revenue for the album within the first 24 hours amounted to $1.3 million. Variety journalist Chris Willman reported that West has sold 39,500 Stem Players as of February 18, 2022, according to the rapper's claims. Willman noted that the player has been available since October 2021. On April 29, 2026, West claimed that the album sold over 100 thousand units in response to a fan claiming the album was unreleased.

Following the album's release on streaming services on April 30, 2025, it disappointed commercially. In the United States, it sold 6,100 album-equivalent units, becoming West's lowest selling first week. It is reported that had it had a full week of tracking, it would've sold 21,000 units in its first week. Due to its low first week sales, the album failed to enter the Billboard 200 chart, though it did debut at number 39 on the Top Current Album Sales chart, and at number 30 on the Independent Albums chart.

Outside the U.S., the album charted in the United Kingdom, peaking at number 19 on the Official Album Downloads chart, Switzerland, peaking at number 72, Flanders, peaking at number 193, and Japan, where it reached 44 on the Album Downloads chart.

== Track listing ==
Donda 2 track listing
No.	Title	Writer(s)	Producer(s)	Length
1.	"True Love"	Kanye West; Jahseh Onfroy; Michael George Dean; John Cunningham; Mark Williams; Raul Cubina; Jarrod Morgan; John Branch; Peter O. Phillips	West; Cunningham; Mike Dean; Ojivolta; Twisco	2:17
2.	"Broken Road"	West; Caleb Toliver; Malik Yusef; Orlando Wilder; Yakki Divioshi; Courtlin Jabrae; Albert Daniels	West; AllDay; Theophilus London	1:41
3.	"Get Lost"	West; Williams; Cubina	West; AllDay; Ojivolta	2:34
4.	"Keep the Flowers"	West; Nayvadius Cash; Nasir Pemberton; Williams; Cubina; Morgan; Wilder; Divioshi; Tiwan Raybon	West; Digital Nas; Ojivolta; Twisco	2:51
5.	"Jesse"	West; Raybon; Tavoris Hollins Jr.	West; Digital Nas; Manny Laurenko; Foreign Vu; Qua Xo	2:07
6.	"Too Easy"	West; Dwayne Abernathy Jr.; Victoria Legrand; Alex Scally; Raybon	West; AllDay; Beach House; Dem Jointz	2:57
7.	"Pablo"	West; Cash; Jacques Webster II; Jacob Canady; Michael Mulé; Isaac De Boni; Williams; Cubina; Ryder Bucaro; Raybon; Brian Warner; Mark Mbogo	West; ATL Jacob; FnZ; Ojivolta; Cunningham; Ryderoncrack	3:00
8.	"Mr Miyagi"	West; Cash; Jordan Carter; Aswad Asif; Cunningham; Williams; Cubina	West; Cunningham; Ojivolta; AyoAA	2:57
9.	"Happy"	West; Cash; Wesley Glass; Raybon	West; Wheezy	3:31
10.	"Security"	West; Pemberton; Jonathan Kirk; Micaela Levi; Benjamin Goldberg; Justin Laboy; Divioshi	West; Digital Nas; Lenny Wee	2:18
11.	"City of God"	West; Maxie Ryles III; Alicia Cook; Dean; Williams; Cubina; Allan Lopez; Andrew Taggart; Asif; Brittany Amaradio; Christian Tejada; Abernathy; Hamzal Hamaal; Malik Piper	West; Ojivolta; AyoAA; Hemz; Lil Mav; the Chainsmokers; Tweek Tune; Tommy Rush; Dem Jointz^{[a]}; Dean^{[b]}; BoogzDaBeast^{[b]}; Bordeaux^{[b]}; Non Native^{[b]}; Scoop^{[b]}	4:16
12.	"530"	West; Jahmal Gwin; Evan Peter Mast; Mulé; De Boni; Ryles	West; Ty Dolla Sign; BoogzDaBeast; E*vax; FnZ	2:02
13.	"City of Chi"	West; Toliver; Raybon	AllDay	2:42
14.	"Scifi"	West; Matthew Leon; Williams; Cubina; Luca Palozzi; Jun Ha Kim; Leonardo Dessi; Aaron Cheung; Divoshi	West; Ojivolta; Sean Leon; Aaron Paris; Cvre; 905Luca; Dessi	4:00
15.	"Suzy"	West; Brian Miller; Raybon	West; Ojivolta; AllDay	1:24
16.	"Burn Everything"	West; Leon; Bijan Amir; Cunningham	West; Leon; Amir; Cunningham	2:01
17.	"Louie Bags"	West; Jackman Harlow; Pemberton	West; ATL Jacob; Digital Nas; John Cunningham; JW Lucas; Gavin Hadley; Kid Krono	5:05
18.	"We Did It"	West; Hykeem Carter Jr.; Quavious Marshall; Kiari Cephus; Pemberton; Williams; Cubina; Mulé; De Boni; Jahaan Sweet; Ruchaun Akers; Ryles; Divioshi; Raybon	West; Digital Nas; Ojivolta; BoogzDaBeast; FnZ; Jahaan Sweet; Scott Bridgeway; Tom Levesque	3:54
19.	"Maintenance"	West; Williams; Cubina	Ojivolta	1:13
20.	"Lord Lift Me Up"	West; Hollins	West; BoogzDaBeast	2:10
21.	"First Time in a Long Time"	West; DeAndre Way; Williams; Cubina; Morgan; Tahj Clarke; Jackson Schultz; Warren Trotter; Cydel Young	West; AllDay; Ojivolta; Twisco; Prodysgroup	3:08
Total length:				58:34

Stem Player release track listing
No.	Title	Writer(s)	Producer(s)	Length
1.	"True Love"	West; Onfroy; Branch; Cunningham; Williams; Michael Dean; Peter Phillips; Raul Cubina; Jarrod Morgan	Kanye West; John Cunningham; Mike Dean; Ojivolta; Twisco	3:17
2.	"Broken Road"			1:40
3.	"Get Lost"			2:35
4.	"Too Easy"			2:58
5.	"Flowers"			2:51
6.	"Security"			2:16
7.	"We Did It Kid"			2:48
8.	"Pablo"			2:34
9.	"Louie Bags"			3:13
10.	"Happy"			4:45
11.	"Sci-Fi"			3:34
12.	"Selfish"			1:39
13.	"Lord Lift Me Up"			2:09
14.	"City of Gods"	West; Cubina; Dean; Williams; Allan Lopez; Andrew Taggart; Aswad Asif; Brittany Amaradio; Christian Tejada; Dwayne Abernathy; Hamza Hamaal; Malik Piper; Maxie Ryles	West; Ojivolta; AyoAA; Hemz; Lil Mav; the Chainsmokers; Tweek Tune; Dem Jointz^{[a]}; Dean^{[b]}; BoogzDaBeast^{[b]}; Bordeaux^{[b]}; Non Native^{[b]}; Scoop^{[b]}	4:16
15.	"First Time in a Long Time"			3:04
16.	"Eazy"	West; Drew Gavin; Jayceon Taylor; Lorenzo Patterson	Dean; Big Duke; Cash Jones; DJ Premier; Hit-Boy	3:54
Total length:				47:22

Notes

- ^{^[a]} signifies a co-producer.
- ^{^[b]} signifies an additional producer.
- Track titles are stylized in all caps on the streaming release.
- "Selfish" and "Eazy" are missing from the streaming release.
- Many tracks were either retitled or initially retitled in the streaming release:
  - "Flowers" has been retitled to "Keep the Flowers".
  - "We Did It Kid" has been retitled to "We Did It".
  - "Sci-Fi" has been retitled to "Scifi".
  - "City of Gods" has been retitled to "City of God".

Uncredited features

- "True Love" and "Selfish" feature vocals by XXXTentacion.
- "Broken Road" and "City of Chi" feature vocals by Don Toliver.
- "We Did It Kid" features vocals by Baby Keem and Migos.
- "Pablo" features vocals by Future and Travis Scott. It also features additional vocals by Marilyn Manson on the streaming release.
- "Louie Bags" features vocals by Jack Harlow.
- "Happy" features vocals by Future.
- "Sci-Fi" and "Burn Everything" feature vocals by Sean Leon.
- "Lord Lift Me Up" features vocals by Vory.
- "City of Gods" features vocals by Alicia Keys and Fivio Foreign, with additional vocals by Playboi Carti.
- "First Time in a Long Time" features vocals by Soulja Boy.
- "Eazy" features vocals by the Game.
- "Mr Miyagi" features vocals by Future and Playboi Carti.

Sample credits

- "Security" contains samples of "Wanna Trap", as written and performed by Mica Levi. The streaming release originally featured an excerpt of a monologue by DJ Akademiks, which was removed on the June 6 update.
- "Sci-Fi" features an excerpt of a monologue by Kim Kardashian from Saturday Night Live.
- "Louie Bags" features an excerpt of a telephone call made by Kamala Harris (We did it, Joe!).
- "Lord Lift Me Up" contains samples of "Just Out of My Reach", written by Jesse J. Lewis and Sam Dees, as performed by Dees.
- "Eazy" contains samples of "Eazy-Duz-It", as performed by Eazy-E.

== Charts ==
Chart performance for Donda 2
Chart (2025)	Peak position
Belgian Albums (Ultratop Flanders)	193
Japanese Download Albums (Billboard Japan)	44
Portuguese Albums (AFP)	102
Swiss Albums (Schweizer Hitparade)	72
UK Album Downloads (Official Charts)	19
US Independent Albums (Billboard)	30
US Top Current Album Sales (Billboard)	39
