= God Level =

Unreleased song by Kanye West

Song by Kanye West
- Recorded: 2014
- Genre: Industrial hip-hop
- Length: 2:36 (SoundCloud preview)
- Songwriters: Kanye West; Ross Matthew Birchard; Michael Dean; Noah Goldstein; Charles Njapa; Dick Hyman
- Producers: Kanye West; 88-Keys; Hudson Mohawke; Mike Dean; Noah Goldstein

"God Level" is an unreleased song by American rapper Kanye West. Debuting during a May 2014 Adidas commercial for the 2014 FIFA World Cup, it was intended to feature on Yeezus II, (Note: Also written as Yeezus 2.) the cancelled sequel to West's sixth studio album, Yeezus (2013), which would later become The Life of Pablo (2016) after a series of name changes. Incorporating elements of industrial music, the song features synths and tribal drum patterns. It was produced and written by West, Hudson Mohawke, 88-Keys, Mike Dean, and Noah Goldstein; Dick Hyman received a credit due to his work being sampled.

Adidas Football uploaded an extended version of "God Level" to SoundCloud after the commercial aired, which several music publications believed was the full version, although Mohawke claimed that it had been shortened from its original length. The song's previews received positive reviews from music critics, who praised its production as similar to Yeezus.

== Background and promotion ==
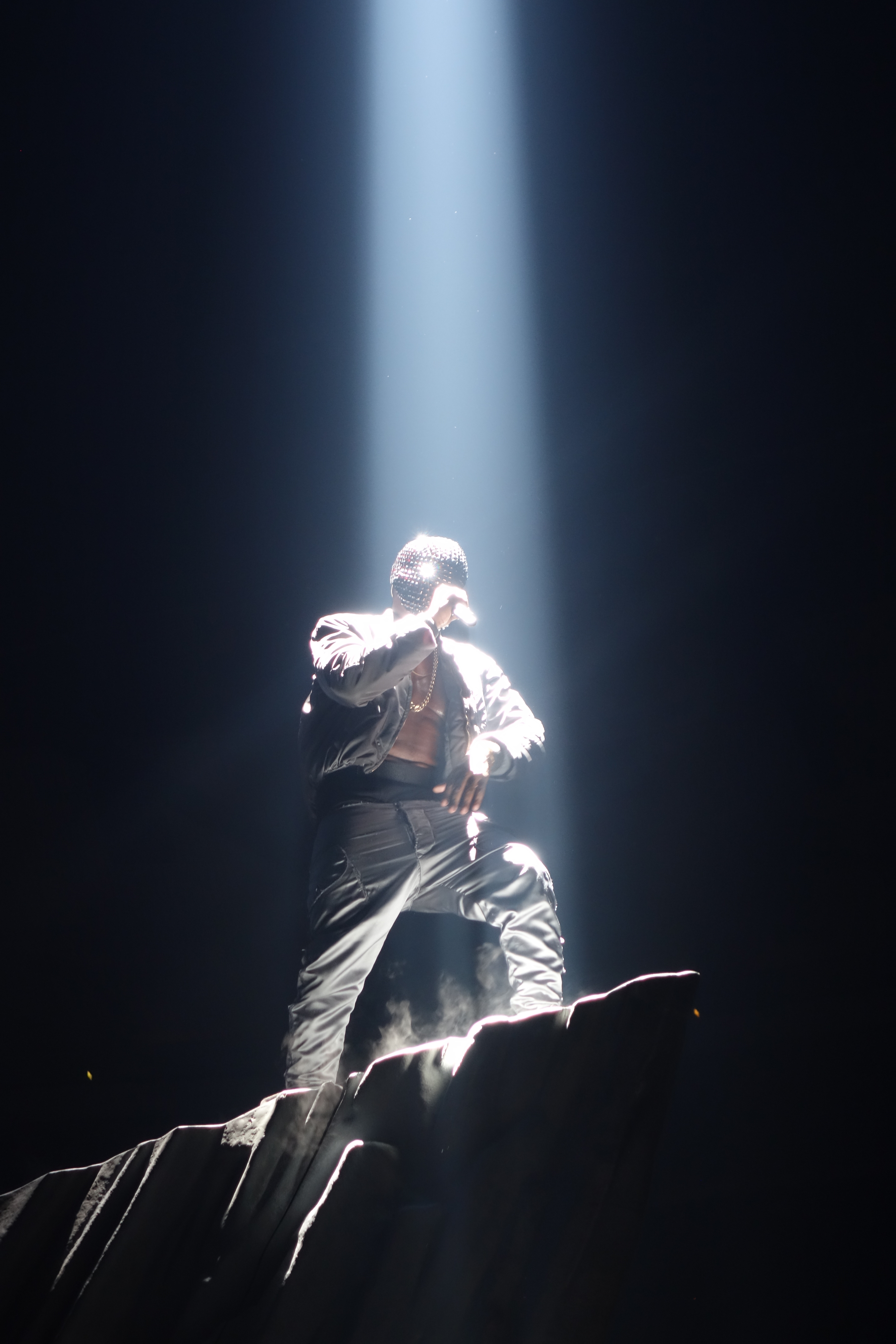
West performing atop a mountain at the United Center in Chicago during the The Yeezus Tour in December 2013

In June 2013, Kanye West released his sixth studio album, Yeezus, to critical acclaim. Shortly afterwards, it was reported that West was working on a then-unnamed sequel album. Several record producers, including Rick Rubin, Q-Tip, and Mike Will Made It, confirmed their involvement on the album, and West discussed it in subsequent interviews. West worked on the album under the internal name Yeezus II, intending to release it in 2014, but later renamed it to So Help Me God as the album's themes became more distant from that of Yeezus. After announcing So Help Me God in May 2015, West released several singles for the album, though would once again change its direction, retitling it Swish. This incarnation, after undergoing more name changes, eventually released in February 2016 as The Life of Pablo.

On May 24, 2014, Adidas aired a commercial titled "The Dream: All in or Nothing" to promote the 2014 FIFA World Cup. Starring several football players, including Lionel Messi, Dani Alves, and Bastian Schweinsteiger, the advertisement is scored by "God Level" as the athletes train and compete in a tournament. The song was the first previewed for Yeezus II, being followed by a July 2014 listening event at the Café Royal Hotel in London, consisting of 20 songs. After the commercial aired, Hudson Mohawke confirmed via Twitter that he, Mike Dean, 88-Keys, and Noah Goldstein contributed production to the song alongside West. That same day, Adidas Football uploaded an extended version to their official SoundCloud account, though it was later deleted. Music publications initially reported this as the full version of the song, although Mohawke stated the upload was cut down from its original length. At a May 28 show for Red Bull Music Academy, Mohawke briefly teased a snippet of "God Level" before mixing it into a different track.

== Composition ==
"God Level"
An excerpt from "God Level", featuring West rapping over tribal-inspired drums.

The SoundCloud version of "God Level" runs under 3 minutes in length. The song's instrumental is sparse, consisting of a drum-heavy beat with tribal-inspired patterns, as well as synthesizers. Several reviewers compared its production style to Yeezus due to both sharing influences from industrial music. Spin's Colin Joyce wrote that the song "sounds appropriately like a grating post-Yeezus banger", but noted it was inconsistent with reports that West's upcoming album would have a "kinder, gentler" sound.

This version of "God Level" also contains few lyrics, with most of the track being instrumental. In its verse, West raps about seeing "sharks in the water" and promises the listener they "don't see murder like this this often." He later raps that said sharks "try to do nothing but put cocks in your daughter," which Dharmix X of Complex characterized as "a line as jarring as the production itself." In its chorus, West repeats the phrase "God level".

== Critical reception ==
Though never officially released, the preview of "God Level" received positive reviews from music critics, who often highlighted the production. Tyson Wray of Beat complimented the song's production as "crisp as fuck", referring to its credited producers as "a dream team". In a review for Okayplayer, Scott Heins lauded the song's production, attesting "that it hammers all the way through" due to how "Mohawke's brand of weird mixes perfectly with the current Kanye brand of jagged acid-rap." Though he noted that West's vocals are absent from most of the SoundCloud upload, Heins referred to its additional lyrics as "raw. Real raw", comparing them to West's 2013 song "I'm in It". Slate's Sharan Shetty praised the song as a positive shift from West's previous release, being his feature on Future's single "I Won" (2014), which she criticized as "West succumbing to all his worst, most offensive, and most reductive impulses." In comparison, Shetty saw "God Level" as "a bit more palatable, and far more interesting musically", finding that the song could have easily fit on Yeezus due to its aggressive production.

== Credits and personnel ==
Credits adapted from Rolling Stone, ASCAP, and the BMI Repertoire. (Note: Find additional credits for the song on the BMI Repertoire by searching the work number #17831779.)

- Kanye West – performer, songwriter, producer
- 88-Keys – songwriter, producer
- Hudson Mohawke – songwriter, producer
- Mike Dean – songwriter, producer
- Noah Goldstein – songwriter, producer
- Dick Hyman – songwriter
