= Mama's Boyfriend =

Unreleased song by Kanye West

Song by Kanye West
- Recorded: 2010
- Genre: Hip-hop
- Length: 3:44 (original leak)
- Songwriter: Kanye West
- Producers: Kanye West; Q-Tip; DJ Premier

"Mama's Boyfriend" (also known as "Mama's Boy") is an unreleased song by American rapper Kanye West. The song was performed by West during an a cappella freestyle at Facebook's offices, and was intended to feature on West's fifth studio album, My Beautiful Dark Twisted Fantasy (2010). Written and produced by West, with additional production from DJ Premier and Q-Tip, versions of the track use a sample of "Movin' Out (Anthony's Song)" (1977) by Billy Joel. Lyrically, West raps from the perspective of his child and adult selves, criticizing his mother's new boyfriend only to mature into a similar man.

Though never officially released, versions of "Mama's Boyfriend" leaked online throughout the 2010s, with West's then-label Def Jam claiming that the initial leak was fabricated and used a fake instrumental. Both the song's leaks and official previews received positive reviews from music critics, who praised the song's production, lyrics, and the use of child and adult perspectives. It was additionally performed live at Rolling Stone's offices and The Box in New York City.

== Background and recording ==
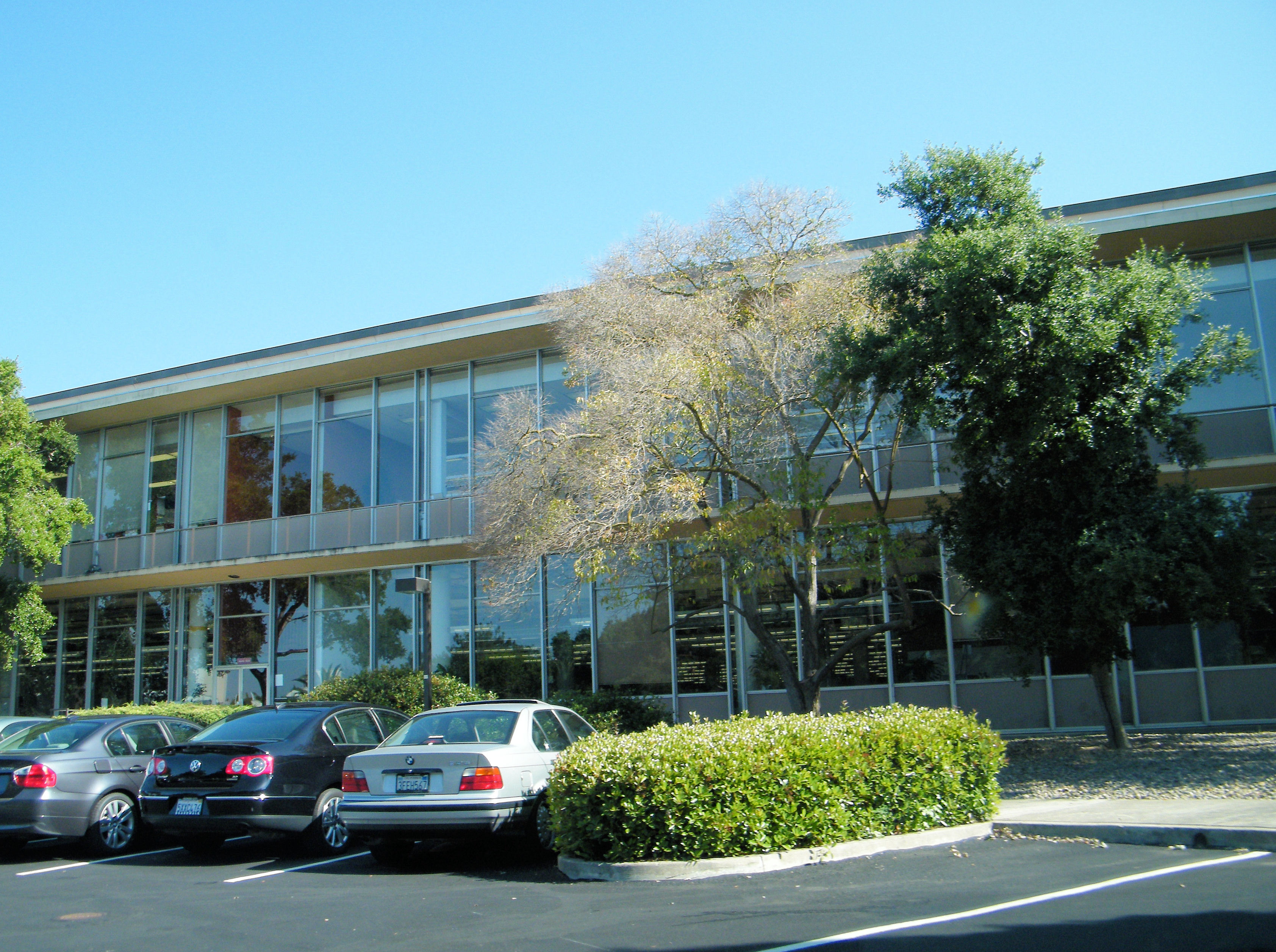
The Facebook headquarters building in Palo Alto, California, where West freestyled "Mama's Boyfriend"

"Mama's Boyfriend" was worked on by West during his recording sessions for My Beautiful Dark Twisted Fantasy in Honolulu, Hawaii in 2010. He reached out to DJ Premier to add scratches to the song, granting him a private hard drive that took several passwords and steps to be unlocked. In an interview with Vibe, Premier stated that after making his additions, West sent him an email with instructions to "destroy all the roughs [he] sent [him]." Q-Tip, one of the song's producers, previewed the song during his lecture at Red Bull Music Academy on June 6, 2013. He revealed that numerous different versions exist, including one featuring American rapper Soulja Boy. According to Q-Tip, West asked him to incorporate samples of "Movin' Out (Anthony's Song)" by Billy Joel to create a Mobb Deep-inspired sound.

West premiered "Mama's Boyfriend" as an a cappella freestyle on July 27, 2010, during his visit to Facebook Headquarters in Palo Alto, California. "Lost in the World", "Chain Heavy", and "Sweat On My Face" were also recited. This appearance was one of the first public previews of material from West's then-upcoming album My Beautiful Dark Twisted Fantasy, with Entertainment Weekly noting the raw tone of the performance. On iTunes' pre-save for the album, the song was listed as an 'Exclusive iTunes Bonus' alongside "Chain Heavy", as its sixteenth track.

== Composition and lyrics ==
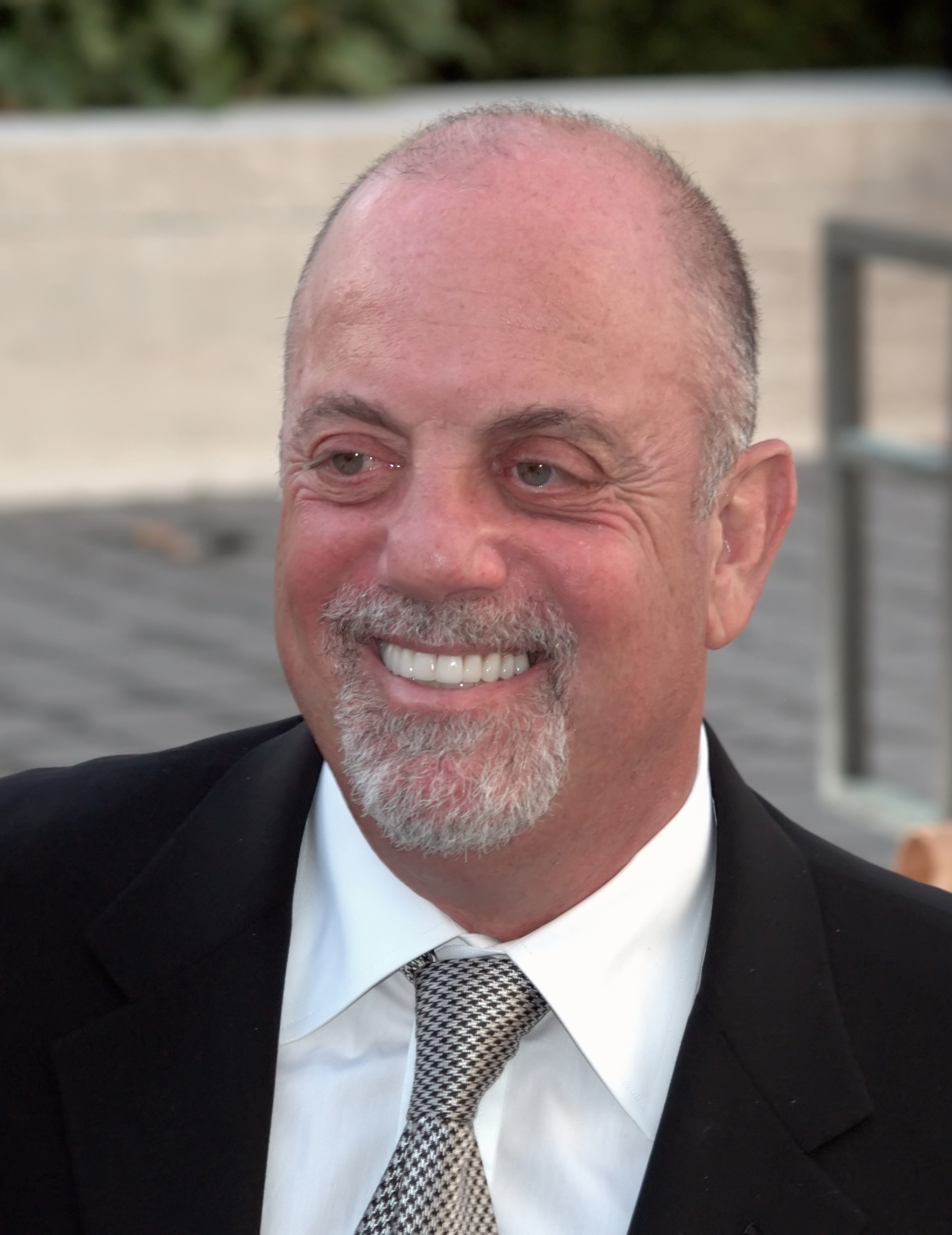
"Movin' Out (Anthony's Song)" by Billy Joel (pictured in 2009) was sampled on versions of "Mama's Boyfriend".

The original leak of "Mama's Boyfriend" featured soulful production, incorporating hard-hitting drums and a filtered, sped-up soul sample. Rolling Stone described it as being signified by "classic Kanye production, complete with a crisp beat and a pitched-up soul sample." Erika Ramirez of Billboard highlighted the production and its reminiscence to West's earlier works, comparing the beat's handclaps to those from West's debut studio album, The College Dropout (2004). Similarly, Mother Jones's Karmah Elmusa compared West's vocal performance to the "poppy and melodious" sound of Late Registration (2005). Some versions of the track sample "Movin' Out (Anthony's Song)" by Billy Joel.

Lyrically, "Mama's Boyfriend" centers on two decades-apart verses, where West raps within a child and adult perspective. Rapping as his five-year-old self, West disapproves of his mother's new boyfriend, characterizing him as uncharismatic and only wanting sex. In one line, he screams outside his mother's locked bedroom that he won't sleep until he's let in.

By the second verse, West, twenty years older, finds himself in the same position as his mother's boyfriend. He raps, "Now that I'm grown, yo, the table's turned around." To Lambert, West's lyrics show him confronting how he became like the men he hated, fitting the song into a broader wave of introspective hip-hop from artists such as Drake, Lil Wayne, and Nicki Minaj.

== Leaks and previews ==
"Mama's Boyfriend" was leaked online on June 13, 2011, via an unofficial GOOD Music blog. Critics identified it as an outtake from My Beautiful Dark Twisted Fantasy, with the Boombox describing it as an outlier from the "epic posse cuts like 'All of the Lights' and 'Monster'." The track's preview was widely shared online by music blogs. Several publications also noted its finished sound. West's label at the time, Def Jam, claimed the leak was "entirely bogus and unsanctioned", and that "an unknown party or parties got a hold of Kanye West's vocal track and added their own soundbed to it." The label also stated that West was "deeply disappointed" with the leak. Contrary to live performances, the leak did not include the sample of "Movin' Out (Anthony's Song)" by Billy Joel, which was featured in the version Q-Tip later previewed. In February 2016, another rendition of the track leaked online, which XXL described as "a CD quality version".

== Critical reception ==
Though never officially released, "Mama's Boyfriend" received positive reviews from music critics. In a review of the song's Facebook headquarters performance, Keith Murphy of Vibe highlighted the song's lyrical perspective of a child protecting his mother, deeming it "a leading contender for rhyme of the year". Similarly, The Seattle Times's Andrew Matson commended its lyricism. Writing for PopCrush, Cristin Maher praised its production lyrics, opining that the "chilled out yet intoxicating hip-hop beat" paired with "the moving and singable lyrics" makes it reminiscent of "the West we all fell in love with". Andrew Barber of Fake Shore Drive stated he "almost like[d] [it] better than anything on MBDTF."

== Live performances ==
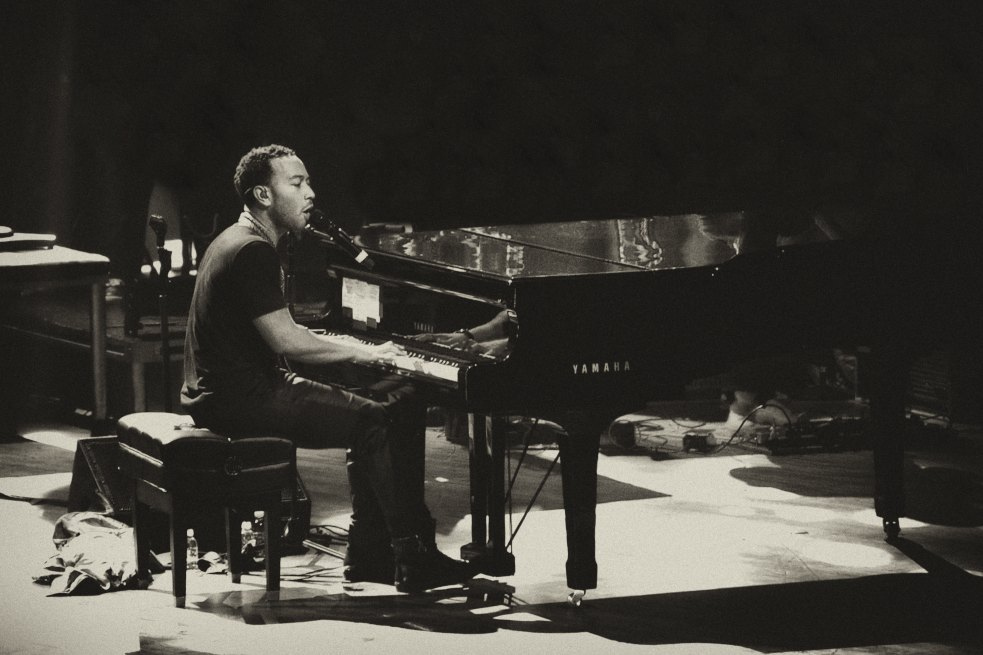
John Legend (pictured in 2008) played piano during West's The Box performance of "Mama’s Boyfriend".

The song was debuted by West during a live performance at Facebook Headquarters in Palo Alto, California, on July 27, 2010. West fully performed a cappella, in which he stood atop a table while rapping. Following the visit, West thanked his fans and audience at Facebook on his blog.

On July 30, 2010, West made a surprise visit to Rolling Stone's offices. He recited lines from "Mama's Boyfriend" in the conference room, though he didn't allow employees to take any recordings. The song was performed at a private show for industry insiders at The Box, New York City, on August 13, 2010. The performance was supported by singer John Legend, who played piano chords to "Movin' Out (Anthony's Song)". Julianne Escobedo Shepherd of The Fader praised the performance, describing it as the "best—and most illuminating—part of the night".
