= Eazy (song) =

Single by The Game and Kanye West

from the album Drillmatic – Heart vs. Mind and Donda 2
- Released: January 15, 2022
- Recorded: January 2022
- Genre: Progressive rap
- Length: 3:54
- Label: 100 Entertainment
- Songwriters: Jayceon Taylor; Kanye West; Drew Gavin; Lorenzo Patterson
- Producers: Hit-Boy; Mike Dean; DJ Premier; Cash Jones; Big Duke

The Game singles chronology
"Welcome to LA (Remix)" (2022)	"Eazy" (2022)	"Stupid" (2022)

Kanye West singles chronology
"Believe What I Say" / "Off the Grid" (2021)	"Eazy" (2022)	"City of Gods" (2022)

Music video
- "Eazy" on YouTube

"Eazy" is a song by American rappers The Game and Kanye West. It was released as a single on January 15, 2022. The song was released exclusively on Spotify two days before. The cover art for the single attracted controversy due to it featuring Nick Knight's highly graphic 1997 photo of a skinned monkey. The song's music video attracted additional controversy due its depiction of West burying comedian Pete Davidson alive, who was dating his ex-wife Kim Kardashian at the time.

== Background and marketing ==
On January 12, 2022, in an Instagram video shared by designer Tracey Mills, West was seen talking to DJ Premier on FaceTime with the Game and fellow collaborators Pusha T and Mike Dean in the studio. In the video, West said that he was releasing a song that Friday and was asking DJ Premier if he could do a scratch for the song. On January 15, 2022, the song was released exclusively on Spotify before being added to other streaming platforms a day later.

== Cover art ==
On January 14, 2022, West revealed the cover art for "Eazy" on Instagram, captioning the post "My life was never eazy". The artwork depicts a skinned monkey against a blood red background. Originally photographed by English photographer and frequent West collaborator Nick Knight in 1997, it was part of his research for the War editorial of Big Magazine, which he described as "a study in physiology, form, philosophy, and death". The picture was not published until 2013, when Knight curated a series of research imagery for SHOWstudio. In the same year, Knight said the following regarding the image:

These corpses of skinned animals had nothing of life left in them, not even the most tiny speck or hint of their former beauty, majesty and purpose. However, they were not inhabited by death in the way they had been by life. Once the life had gone, they were just bags of barely held together of [sic] flesh, bone and sinew. Nothing left, except their smell; they stank. They reeked. Every time, for years afterwards when I looked at the 10 by 8 transparencies, the stench came straight back to me as pungent as if each image was saturated with it. That, I concluded was death.

Animal rights organization PETA commented on the cover, saying that it is "reminiscent of monkeys PETA has found" and that "when you remove the fur, you can't miss that there's a person in there, that they are fellow primates, and do not belong to us to abuse for any purpose".

== Music videos ==
The first music video for "Eazy" premiered via Instagram on March 2, 2022. The video is half claymation and half live action. It was heavily criticized upon release, as it depicts West kidnapping and burying alive Pete Davidson. Davidson is implied to be decapitated, as West holds a disembodied head throughout the live action segments. In response to the controversy, West posted on Instagram that "Art is not a proxy for any ill or harm, Any suggestion otherwise about my art is false and mal intended."

On March 9, a second music video with CGI-animated visuals was released, in which the skinned monkey from the "Eazy" cover art is depicted beating a 3D model of Davidson, whose face is blurred out.

== Credits ==
- Production – Hit-Boy, Mike Dean, Big Duke, Cash Jones
- Scratches – DJ Premier
- Vocals – The Game, Kanye West, Julia Fox (background)

== Charts ==
Chart performance for "Eazy"
Chart (2022)	Peak position
Canada Hot 100 (Billboard)	35
Global 200 (Billboard)	35
Iceland (Tónlistinn)	11
Ireland (IRMA)	20
Lithuania (AGATA)	59
New Zealand (Recorded Music NZ)	35
South Africa Streaming (TOSAC)	13
Sweden (Sverigetopplistan)	86
Switzerland (Schweizer Hitparade)	63
UK Singles (Official Charts)	32
UK Indie (Official Charts)	3
UK Hip Hop/R&B (Official Charts)	13
US Billboard Hot 100	49
US Hot R&B/Hip-Hop Songs (Billboard)	13
