= Kano Computing =

British computer company

Kano Computing Ltd.
- Type: Private
- Industry: Technology
- Founded: 2013; 13 years ago
- Founder: Alex Klein; Saul Klein; Yonatan Fridman
- Headquarters: London, England, UK
- Key people: Alex Klein (CEO)
- Products: Computers, hardware, educational software
- Number of employees: <50 employees (2021)
- Website: www.kano.me

Kano Computing is a London-based startup that specializes in computer hardware and software. Founded in January 2013, the company focuses on creating educational kits that utilize Raspberry Pi single-board computers to teach STEM subjects to children. Kano Computing is known for its innovative approach to technology education and has gained recognition for its products and initiatives in the tech industry.

The company received recognition for its approach, securing funding through crowdfunding campaigns and a £14 million investment from HSBC. Collaborations with Kanye West and Novak Djokovic highlighted Kano's impact in the tech and education sectors. Accolades include Fast Company's 50 Most Innovative Companies list, Time's Invention of the Year awards, and the Golden Lion at the Cannes Lions global marketing awards.

== History ==
Kano was founded in January 2013 by Alex Klein, son of Getty Images co-founder Jonathan Klein; his cousin, Saul Klein, a major tech venture capitalist; and Yonatan Raz-Fridman. The company's name originated from Kanō Jigorō, the creator of judo. Kano was a computing company that sold kits consisting of Raspberry Pi single-board computers and various accessories for teaching STEM, computing, and robotics to children.

In 2023, Kano split its business and formed a second company named Kano World. Ollie Dotsch, former head of sales and education at Kano Computing, served as CEO.. Kano World limited filed for insolvency after 6 months, and was wound up in 2025.

== Products ==
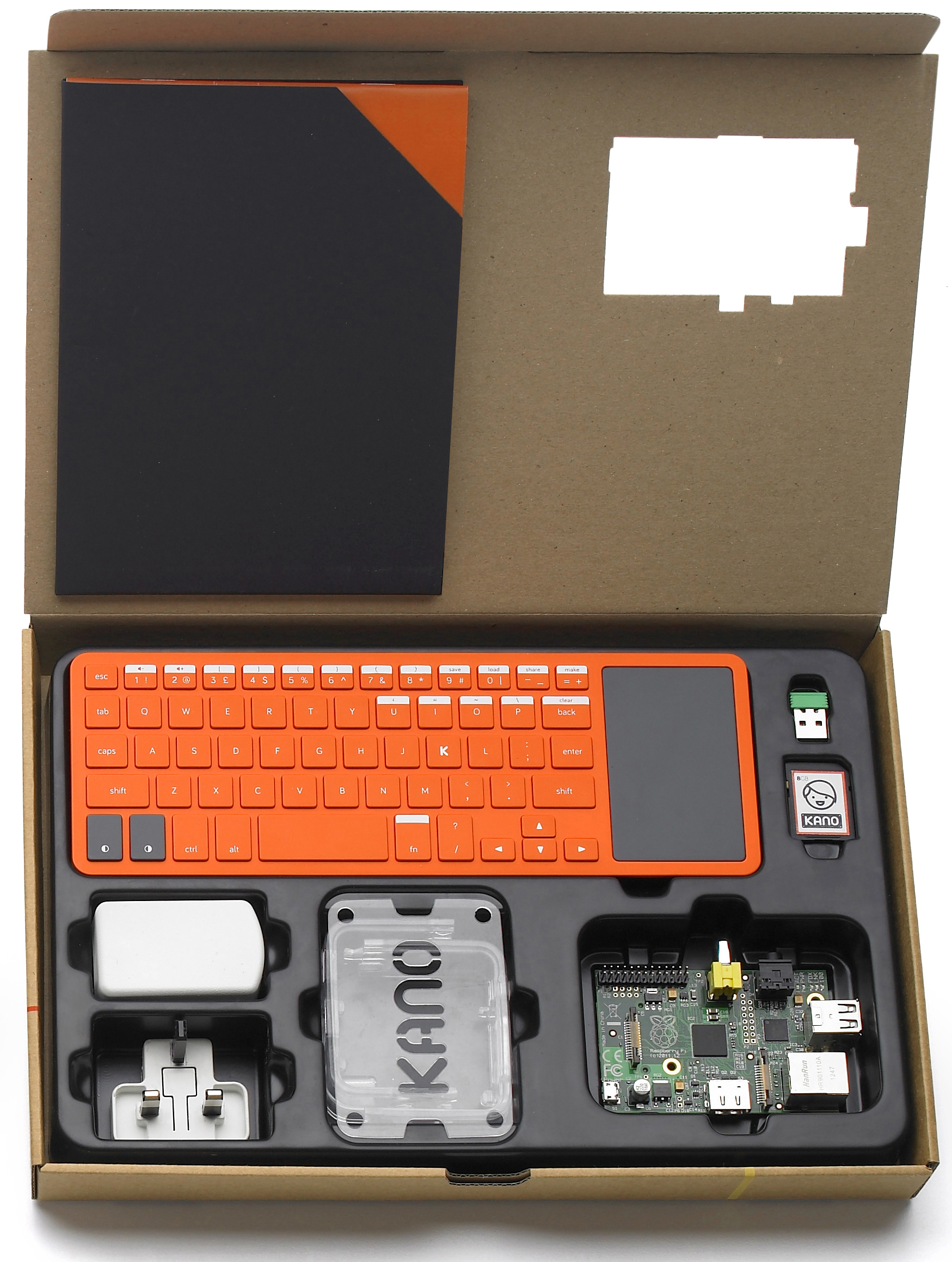
A Kano Computer Kit in box

In August 2013, Kano launched an initial Kano Computer Prototype box. It consisted of a small USB keyboard, several prototype booklets, a case, a Raspberry Pi 1, and an SD card loaded with an early version of the Raspbian OS. All 200 prototypes released were sold.

In 2014, the firm launched the Kano Computer Kit, an educational computer kit to teach hardware assembly and basic programming skills. It was built on Raspberry Pi circuit boards and the company's custom open-source operating system, Kano OS.

In 2018, the firm partnered with Warner Bros to release an electronic Harry Potter wand. Kano themselves stated the aim of the firm was to teach the basics of languages such as JavaScript.

Also in 2018, the firm released motion sensor kits with Frozen and Star Wars themes in a multi-year partnership with Disney. The USB motion sensor detects movement in front of the sensor's receptacle and users were given the ability to program objects based on the motion used above the device.

In 2019, the company partnered with Microsoft to release the Kano PC, a laptop and tablet pre-loaded with both Windows 10 and Kano's educational tools. Later in 2019, Kano launched its first educational subscription, Kano Club, where users can access programming and animation software, lessons and tutorials online. The service also includes a multiplayer component, and a community section.

Kano launched a line of computer accessories in 2020 to coincide with its Kano PC release. These included a mouse, headphones and webcam. In October 2021, the firm began shipping of the Stem Player in partnership with Yeezy Tech and Kanye West.

In June 2023, Kano Computing went into administration, and its assets were sold to Ashdust LLP, a company connected to Kano Computing's CEO, Alex Klein.

Under Ashdust, the company continues its operations and intends to launch new products under the Stem brand, including the Stem2 Speaker and Stem3 Projector.

== Funding ==
Kano launched a crowdfunding campaign on the Kickstarter platform in November 2013. The company raised over $1.5 million from 13,387 backers, at the time becoming the crowdfunding service's largest learning campaign. Initial backers of the Kano were users from over 80 countries.

In May 2015, Kano secured $15 million in a Series A funding round. The round was led by Breyer Capital, with additional participation from Collaborative Fund and Jim O’Neill, former chairman of Goldman Sachs Asset Management.

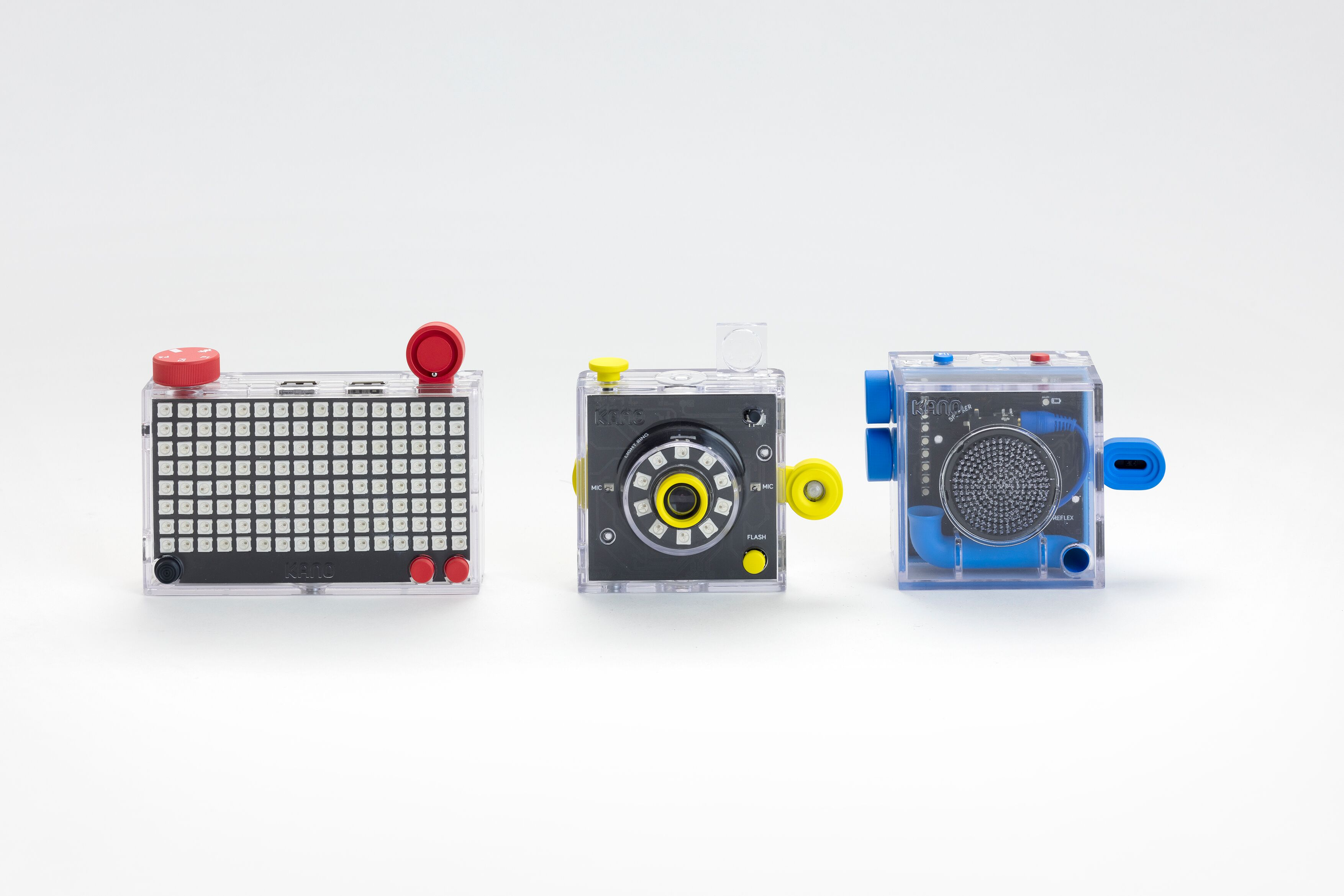
Kano pixel, camera, and speaker kits

In 2016, Kano initiated a second Kickstarter campaign to fund products including a pixel art kit, motion sensor and webcam. The campaign generated $643,030 from 2,399 backers.

In April 2019, Kano announced a £14 million funding package from HSBC.

In July 2020, Microsoft invested £800,000 in Kano Computing. This funding supported the development and release of the Kano PC, a modular Windows 10 laptop designed for educational purposes.

Alex Klein served as the company's chief executive officer (CEO).

== Links to Kanye West ==
In January 2019, American musician and businessman Kanye West met Alex Klein during a chance encounter at the CES technology show in Las Vegas.

Through early 2019, the company was said to have been collaborating with West on an undisclosed technology product, later revealed in August 2021 to be the Stem Player.

In November 2019, CEO Klein contributed lyrics to the Jesus Is King track "Water".

In October 2021, Kano began shipping the Stem Player.

In January 2023, in light of West's antisemitic remarks, Kano announced that their collaboration with West has ended, and that the Stem Player would be discontinued.

== Recognition ==
In 2015, Kano won the Red Dot Design Award in 2015.

In October 2016, the company began to work with Serbian tennis player Novak Djokovic and his charitable foundation to deliver computer kits to Serbian children.

In 2019, Kano was ranked number 24 on Fast Company's 50 Most Innovative Companies list. The company also received Time's Invention of the Year awards in 2018 and 2019. In 2014, the company was awarded a Golden Lion at the Cannes Lions global marketing awards. They were also the recipient of a Webby Award and a CES Award in 2015 and 2018 respectively.
