= Stem Player =

Audio remix and streaming device

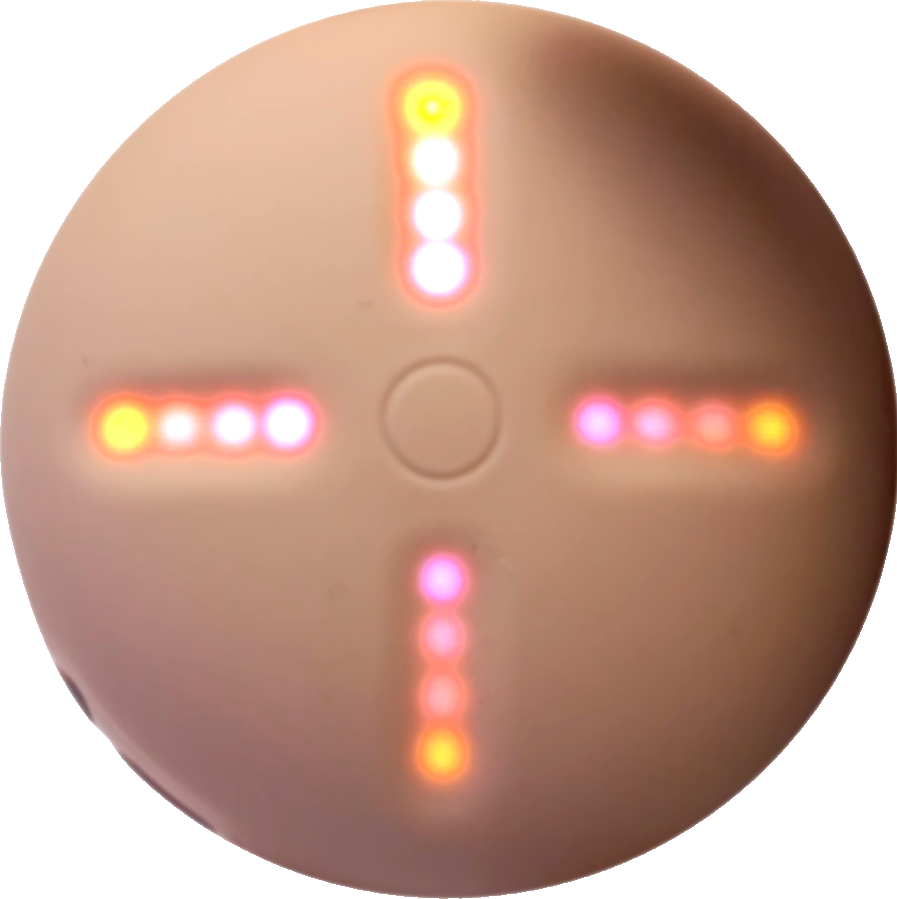
- Developer: Kano Computing; Kanye West
- Type: Digital media player
- Released: 2021
- Storage: 8 GB
- Connectivity: Bluetooth; USB-C; 3.5mm headphone jack
- Website: stem.tech

The Stem Player is an audio remix device and music streaming platform developed by British technology company Kano Computing in collaboration with American artist Kanye West. The device was launched in August 2021 in conjunction with the release of his tenth studio album, Donda. In February 2022, West made an announcement that he would begin releasing music exclusively to the device, commencing with his eleventh studio album, Donda 2, that month.

The Stem Player has four touch-sensitive haptic sliders that adjust individual stems for tracks, and six hardware buttons for volume and effects. The device's service uses artificial intelligence to split tracks into four stems (sometimes isolated vocals, bass, and drums) with each track being able to be manipulated using a front slider. Users can add tracks to the device by uploading an audio file to the device through an official online web application.

Kano ended their collaboration with West in January 2023 in light of West's antisemitic remarks, and discontinued the Donda variant of the Stem Player. The company has collaborated with a variety of artists since, including Ghostface Killah, Bhavi, and a posthumous collection from J Dilla. West later released Donda 2 onto music streaming services in April 2025.

== History ==
In January 2019, following an encounter within the company's booth at CES Technology Show in Las Vegas, Kanye West met company CEO Alex Klein and invited him over to his Calabasas home for breakfast. In an October 2019 interview with journalist Zane Lowe for Apple Music, West confirmed he was working on developing a portable stem player. That same month, Klein was credited as a writer on the track "Water" from West's ninth studio album, Jesus Is King, having contributed to its lyrics.

On August 25, 2021, the Stem Player launched for pre-sale with the initial name of "Donda Stem Player". The device began shipping to purchasers in October that year, pre-loaded with four tracks that would later be released on the deluxe edition of Donda, being "Life of the Party", "Never Abandon Your Family", "Up from the Ashes", and "Remote Control pt 2". On November 17, the Stem Player website was updated to include downloadable stems for Jesus Is King. On December 10, stems for "Wash Us in the Blood" were added in an update.

In February 2022, sixteen tracks from Donda 2 were available for the player.

In January 2023, in light of West's antisemitic remarks, Kano ended their collaboration with West and announced and that the Donda Stem Player would be discontinued after they sold through the remaining stock of 5,000 units. At the same time, Kano announced a new variant of the Stem Player developed in collaboration with Ghostface Killah. This version excluded any content related to Donda 2 or West's other music, and Klein stated in an interview with The Verge that no future editions will contain music by West. On April 8, 2023, a J Dilla skin for the Stem Player became available for pre-order on the website. It came with a 1-year subscription to all current and upcoming J Dilla-related content on the Stem Player website, including previously unreleased instrumentals from the producer.

In June 2023, Kano Computing, the company that developed the Stem Player, went into administration, and the business was acquired in a prepackaged transaction by Alex Klein. In August 2023, the newly established Stem company launched a new variant of the Stem Player developed with Bhavi featuring exclusive music.

== Service ==
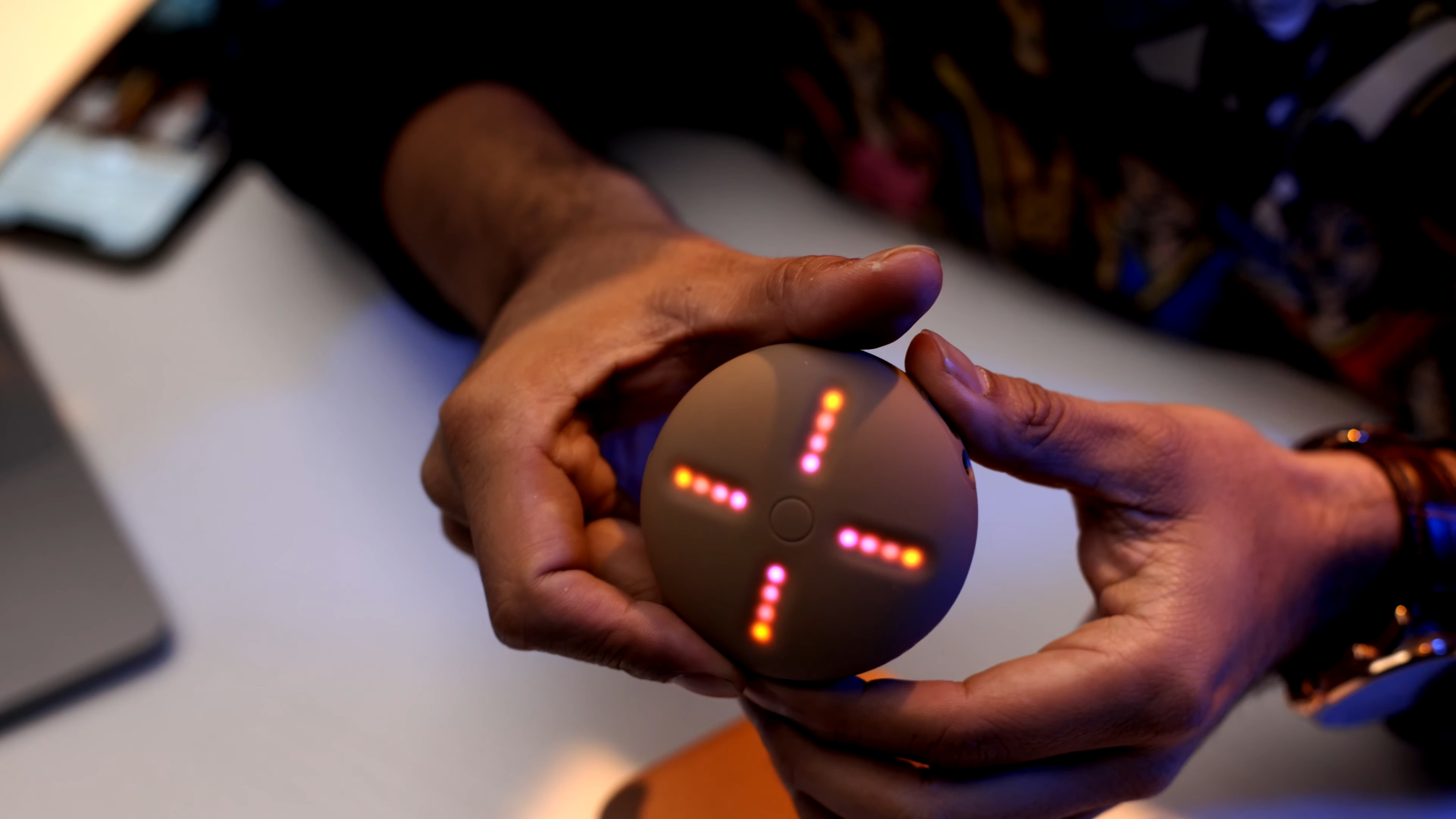
The Stem Player being held

The Stem Player mainly features a service that splits chosen songs into stems that can then be freely customized and manipulated using the device's touch-sensitive sliders and buttons; emulated versions of the service were widely circulated online in early 2022, following criticism of the Stem Player's cost. It features controls for vocal isolation and volume control, real time loop and speed controls, tactile audio effects, audio track management, recording of mixes and recording playback.

The Stem Player is a beige, circular device, measuring 7 centimetres in diameter. 4 touch-sensitive LED sliders cover the front of the device. Physical specifications include 8GB of storage, USB-C connectivity, and support for Bluetooth.

== Reception ==
Upon initial release, the Stem Player was met with a generally mixed to positive reception. Critics praised the device for its unique design as well as its AI-based technology. Criticism of the device was mainly relayed on the lack of wireless file downloading, limited storage space, low transfer speeds, and the omission of a navigation screen. In a review for online publication The Verge, Jay Peters found that "for someone who likes to make their own music, the Stem Player could be a mind-blowingly awesome tool." Jordan Minor of PCMag said "while the Donda Stem Player is an imaginative and surprisingly flexible music creation tool…it’s more of a toy than a path to superstardom". Terence O' Brien of Engadget called the device "fascinating and unique" but saw its design as "slightly unnerving", criticized the instructions as "pretty barebones and at times, slightly confusing", and was "disappointed by the Stem Player's ability to handle non-Donda tracks".

West received criticism following the announcement of his exclusive music releases on the platform, with many fans expressing concern and uncertainty that they would not be able to listen to the latest release as a result. Corey Taylor of Slipknot criticized West for the decision due to the price: "People can't afford their fucking apartments, for fuck's sake." This resulted in an emulator of the device being developed that people have used as an alternative to buying the device.
