= Lord I Need You =

Song by Kanye West

from the album Donda
- Released: August 29, 2021
- Recorded: November 4, 2019 – August 2021
- Length: 2:42
- Label: GOOD; Def Jam
- Songwriters: Kanye West; Jahmal Gwin; Evan Mast; Michael Mule; Isaac De Bonu; Wesley Glass; Mark Williams; Raul Cubina; Lee Stashenko; Carlos St. John Phillips; Anthony Williams II
- Producers: Kanye West; BoogzDaBeast

"Lord I Need You" is a song by American rapper Kanye West from his tenth studio album, Donda (2021). It features additional vocals from the Sunday Service Choir. The song samples Briana Babineaux's cover of "Make Me Over", originally written by B.Slade; the former is also credited as an additional vocalist. Lyrically, it is themed around West's divorce from Kim Kardashian.

"Lord I Need You" originated from a studio session between West and record producer BoogzDaBeast in Wyoming. After the album's release, Babineaux alleged that she was not made aware of the song's usage of "Make Me Over" prior. West had instead contacted B.Slade to clear the sample, as he is the legal owner of the song.

== Background ==
After working on West's ninth studio album Jesus Is King (2019), record producer BoogzDaBeast brought 166 beats into his sessions with West in Wyoming, which "Lord I Need You" originated from. Several other songs–including "Wash Us in the Blood", which was intended to be featured on Donda–were conceived during these sessions.

In August 2021, singer Briana Babineaux shared a since-deleted Instagram post saying that despite praise over her song "Make Me Over", she was not aware of the sample on "Lord I Need You" before the release of Donda. Babineaux declared that she would have appreciated knowing "before the album came out smh..." questioning, "Who does that voice sound like to y'all?" The original composer of "Make Me Over", B.Slade, subsequently responded that Babineaux had never asked him to clear her rendition of the song when he wrote it completely, commenting West did not engage in any theft since he came to "the rightful owner of the song legally" by contacting him for approval.

== Composition ==
In the lyrics of "Lord I Need You", West discusses his divorce from media personality Kim Kardashian. Though many of West's lyrics are endearing, he also alludes to problems in their marriage, such as his struggles with alcoholism.

== Reception ==
"Lord I Need You" received positive reviews from critics. Thomas Hobbs of The Guardian complimented it as "an affecting moment of frailty, even if a memory of 'we used to do the freak seven days a week' has him sounding like Jim’s dad in American Pie." Similarly, Premier Christianity's Aaron Loose called West's verse on the song "touching", noting it as "a sign that Donda is keenly interested in how believers lean on faith during seasons of failure." For The New York Times, Jon Caramanica described the song one of few moments where West can "really" be seen on the album, "[d]espite how intensely you can hear [him]" throughout the rest of it.

== Credits and personnel ==
Credits adapted from Tidal.

Music

- Kanye West – vocals, songwriter, producer
- BoogzDaBeast – songwriter, producer
- Fallen – songwriter, additional producer
- Ojivolta – songwriter, additional producer
- E*vax – songwriter, co-producer
- FnZ – songwriter, co-producer
- Wheezy – songwriter, co-producer
- Sunday Service Choir – additional vocalist
- Briana Babineaux – additional vocalist (sampled)
- Saint Jhn – songwriter
- Lee Stashenko – songwriter
- B.Slade – songwriter

Technical

- Louis Bell – engineer, vocal editing
- Irko – mixing engineer, mastering engineer
- Mike Dean – mixing engineer
- Alejandro Rodriguez-Dawsøn – recording engineer
- Dave Cook – recording engineer
- Jonathan Pzfar – recording engineer
- Josh Berg – recording engineer
- Mikalai Skrobat – recording engineer
- Randy Urbanski – recording engineer
- Shane Fitzgibbon – recording engineer
- Todd Bergman – recording engineer
- Will Chason – recording engineer
- Jason White – vocal producer
- Nikki Grier – vocal producer

== Charts ==
=== Weekly charts ===
Chart performance for "Lord I Need You"
Chart (2021)	Peak position
Australia (ARIA)	54
Canada Hot 100 (Billboard)	61
Global 200 (Billboard)	58
Lithuania (AGATA)	84
Portugal (AFP)	122
South Africa (TOSAC)	13
UK Hip Hop/R&B (Official Charts)	24
US Billboard Hot 100	70
US Hot Christian Songs (Billboard)	21
US Gospel Songs (Billboard)	14
US Hot R&B/Hip-Hop Songs (Billboard)	33

=== Year-end charts ===
2021 year-end chart performance for "Lord I Need You"
Chart (2021)	Position
US Christian Songs (Billboard)	68
US Gospel Songs (Billboard)	29
