= 24 (Kanye West song) =

2021 song by Kanye West

Song by Kanye West

from the album Donda
- Released: August 29, 2021
- Recorded: January 2020–July 2021
- Genre: Gospel
- Length: 3:17
- Label: GOOD; Def Jam
- Songwriters: Kanye West; Albert Daniels; Brian Miller; Cory Henry; Dexter Mills; Malik Yusef; Mark Mbogo; Mark Williams; Raul Cubina; Warryn Campbell
- Producers: Kanye West; AllDay; Ojivolta

Music video
- "24" on YouTube

"24" is a song by American rapper Kanye West from his tenth studio album, Donda (2021). The song features additional vocals from Kenyan-American rapper KayCyy and the Sunday Service Choir. The rappers wrote it alongside AllDay, Al Be Back, Consequence, Cory Henry, Malik Yusef, Ojivolta, and Warryn Campbell. It is a gospel song which includes church organ stabs. The song is titled after the jersey number of Kobe Bryant, for whom it was recorded shortly after his death in January 2020. While the song did experience different reiterations over time, West had written its melody a day before Bryant died as a tribute to him.

Music critics generally commended West's vocal performance on "24" and some welcomed the song's gospel style, while a few critics highlighted the Sunday Service Choir's contributions. In the United States, it reached number 43 on the US Billboard Hot 100, alongside peaking at number 14 on both the Christian Songs and Gospel Songs charts. The song also scored top-50 positions in Australia, Canada, and Iceland, as well as charting at number 40 on the Billboard Global 200. It was certified gold by the Recording Industry Association of America (RIAA) in the US. An accompanying music video debuted on September 16, 2021, which was directed by Nick Knight. In the video, West ascends from a listening event for the album at Mercedes-Benz Stadium into clouds, where he floats around while accompanied by a backdrop. At a concert on Halloween 2021, the Sunday Service Choir performed the song.

== Background and recording ==
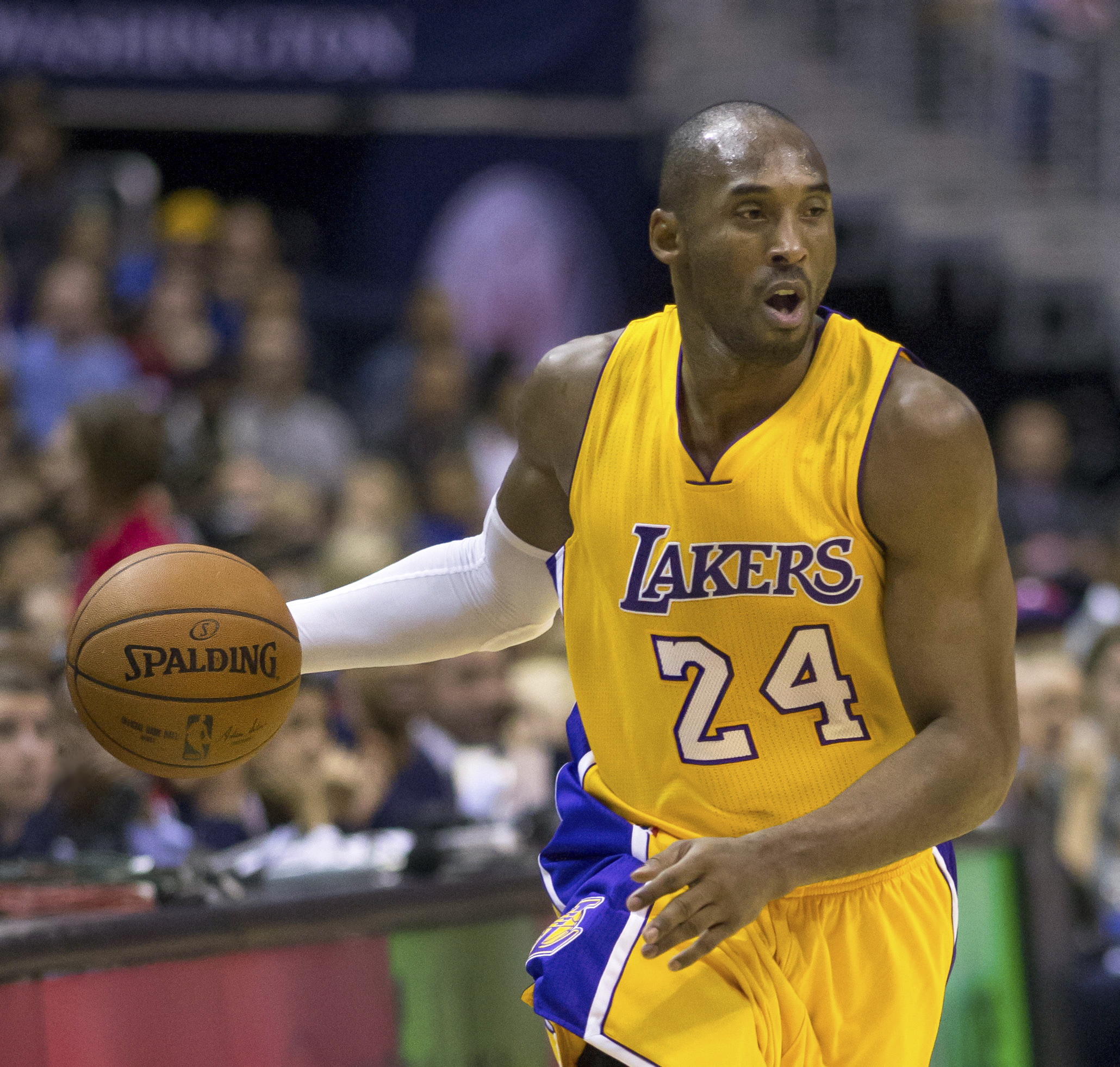
"24" is named after the jersey number of Kobe Bryant, to whom the song was recorded in tribute.

After postponing the release date of his scrapped album Yandhi twice, West started hosting choir sessions in early 2019, enlisting Jason White with arranging a choir and Nikki Grier to help with re-writing lyrics to create gospel renditions of songs in his discography. American singer-songwriter Ant Clemons recalled that the sessions eventually "morphed" into West's group the Sunday Service Choir, who toured around the world with West. West recorded with the Sunday Service Choir for their debut studio album Jesus Is Born (2019), which is credited solely to the group. Shortly before the COVID-19 pandemic started, West's musical input mostly involved him assembling and directing live performances of the Sunday Service Choir. West contributing vocals to the performances became a rarity, as did him releasing his own music. He worked with the group on their EP Emmanuel, which was released in December 2020. The Sunday Service Choir were one of the guest appearances on Donda to be revealed at the public listening parties, while they contributed additional vocals to six of the album's tracks outside of "24". (Note: After Chris Brown was removed from "New Again" in September 2021, the Sunday Service Choir replaced him.)

On July 22, 2021, "24" was previewed during the album's first public listening event at Mercedes-Benz Stadium in Atlanta, Georgia. Basketball player Kobe Bryant had a jersey number of 24, which the song draws its title from in dedication to him. On January 26, 2020, Kobe and his daughter Gianna Bryant were among the passengers that died due to a helicopter crash in Calabasas, California. West simultaneously tweeted out a tribute to him, posting: "Kobe, We love you brother. We're praying for your family and appreciate the life you've lived and all the inspiration you gave." The day after Bryant's death, West held a Sunday Service concert in honor of the athlete. Kenyan-American singer song-writer KayCyy Pluto, who has additional vocals on the track, stated that "24" is dedicated to Bryant and that West cried during the creation of the song. The rapper revealed that it was recorded 2 or 3 days after the crash, with him being invited to the studio and coming up with the "24 hours" part, to which West responded by singing along with "24 candles". KayCyy Pluto called the song "crazy", while summarizing his performance as "super lit". West said that he wrote the melody a day prior to Bryant's death, alongside recalling the song going through different reiterations afterwards. "24" was written by West, AllDay Al Be Back, Consequence, KayCyy Pluto, Malik Yusef, the duo Ojivolta that consists of Mark Williams and Raul Cubina, and Warryn Campbell.

The track's organ was played by singer-songwriter Cory Henry, who recalled getting a call from Rick Rubin inviting him to record with West in San Francisco. He recalled spending four days in the studio with West recording for at least eight tracks. Ultimately, only his work on "24" made the final cut, with him also serving as a co-producer on it. Recalling the recording sessions with West, Henry stated in an interview with BET:

I recorded with Ye on the second floor of this fancy hotel, and I had never done anything like that before. To witness his process was inspiring. They were in the middle of writing one song, while playing beats for another, and every time they played anything his energy level went up past a hundred. He's very serious about what he is doing and that is what I took away from working on "24." Another special moment was when we began chanting together, saying, "God's not finished. God's not finished." Ye then stopped us to say a prayer and I was playing the organ while he was filled with the spirit.

== Composition and lyrics ==
Musically, "24" is a gospel song. The song prominently features stabs of a church organ, which was contributed by Henry. West sings off-key and some of his lines are echoed by the Sunday Service Choir, whose vocals are packed together throughout. The song's vocals were produced by White and Grier, while they were edited by Louis Bell and Patrick Hundley.

Lyrically, "24" serves as a tribute to Bryant and features worship being provided by West and the Sunday Service Choir. The song includes titular phrases, such as "24 hours" and "24 candles". West loudly affirms "we gon' be okay" at one point, with the accompaniment of the Sunday Service Choir. West spreads a message of hope in relation to God, offering a reminder to "just know you're alive". This is followed by him singing "God's not finished" repeatedly towards the end of the song, a line that is also performed by the group. West explained that the line is in reference to how "we all [sic] here for a reason, God got a reason; God sees everything".

== Release and reception ==
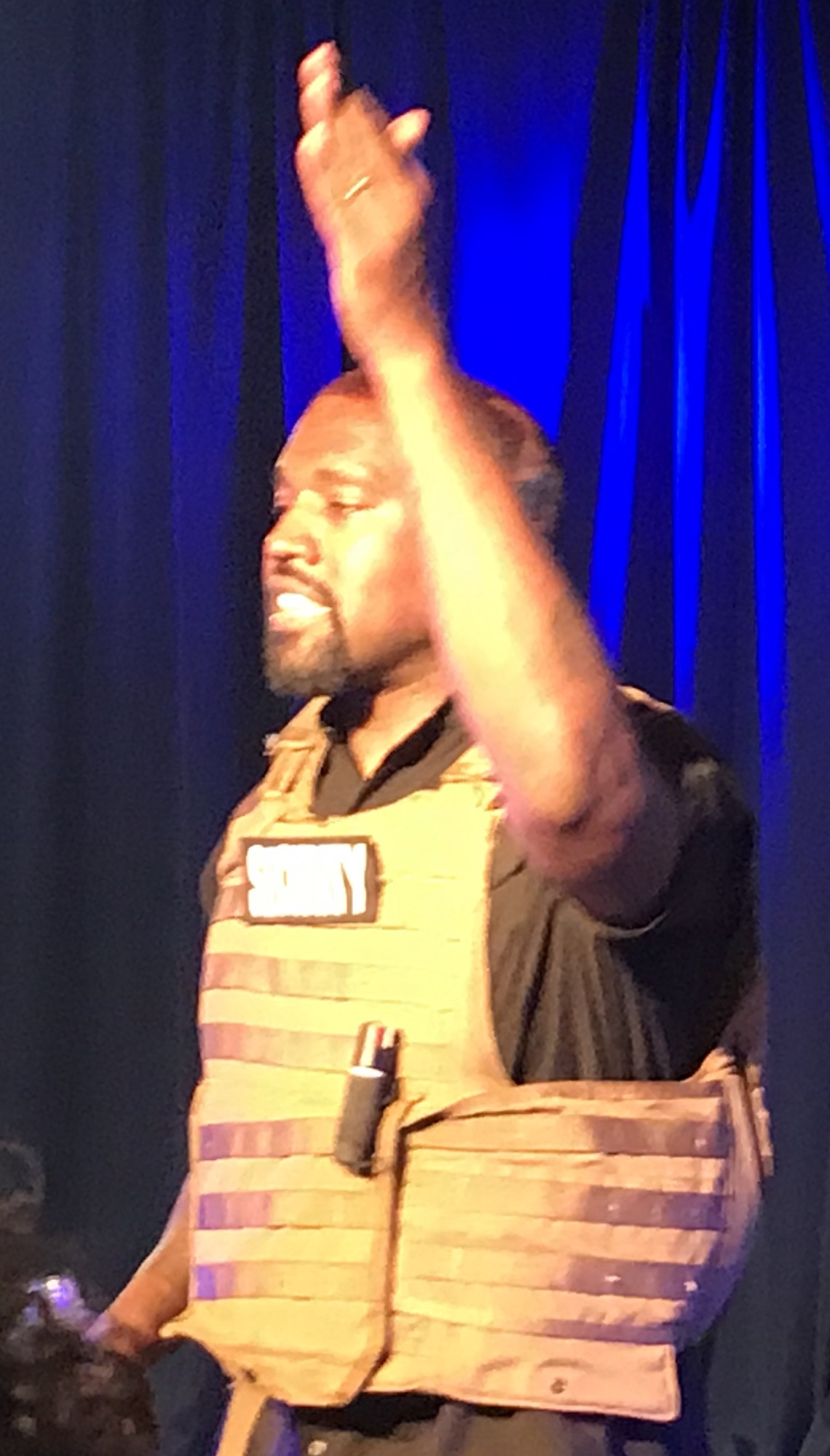
Numerous critics praised West's performance on the song, mostly highlighting the message and some also complimented his vocals.

On August 29, 2021, "24" was included as the 11th track on West's 10th studio album Donda. At PopMatters, Tony DeGenaro named West singing "we gon' be okay" with the Sunday Service Choir "over a discordant organ playing for an imagined too-hot summertime congregation" as "a rare moment of humility" on the album. He also called the line the closest to "sublime as the messy, deeply flawed Donda gets", noting that West has seemingly "broken through" for a second, before it comes to mind how "West's greatest gift is still his consistency". Writing for NME, Rhian Daly opined that West offers a reassuring message "of hope related to the big guy above" on the song. Chris Willman of Variety wrote that due to West being "made in God's image", he strongly relates to the song's repetition of "God's not finished". Vulture's Craig Jenkins viewed the song as calming and one of the best tracks of West's Christian era, further writing that it is "a muted worship-band vamp" with the Sunday Service Choir.

In NPR, Mano Sundaresan lauded the song as a "glorious gospel cut" where West sings with confidence while "endearingly off-key, conversing with the organ stabs" that have "the soul of a seasoned vocalist". Charlie Brock from Gigwise labeled the song "a fun interlude" that would belong truly on West's ninth studio album Jesus Is King (2019), while admitting "the gospel choir is great to listen to", despite being somewhat unusual for a rap album. Aaron Loose of Christianity Today firmly believed that it is a "cathartic gospel song", alongside highlighting the "jubilant chorus". The New York Times critic Jon Caramanica noted how "24" does "sound like kin" to West's music made when he embraced gospel. For Slate, Carl Wilson opined that the song lives up to its potential.

A few reviews contained less enthusiastic assessments. In a mixed review at HipHopDX, David Aaron Brake said that the "gorgeous" song demonstrates "excellent improvements" in West's singing abilities, though wrote off his "unfinished and haphazard" verses. He explained, observing the presence of "some of the weakest bars" of West's career and noting the consistent "lazy pop culture references and corny quips". Mikael Wood from the Los Angeles Times stated that Donda does not have a proper sense of momentum for the song's "dense choral vocals" to fit properly on it, complaining how the lack of momentum "means nothing builds on anything else". Nina Hernandez was highly critical in The A.V. Club, placing the song among the album's "complete filler" that nobody will miss.

== Music video and promotion ==
On September 16, 2021, a music video for "24" was premiered. The video was directed by British fashion photographer Nick Knight, who had previously worked with West on his film Jesus Is King (2019). It followed on from the music video for "Come to Life" as the second visual to be released for a Donda track, both of which include footage from listening events for the album. The visual originally featured a clip of Kobe Bryant and Gianna, which was scrapped due to clearance issues.

The music video begins with a portion of "No Child Left Behind" playing in the background, and a clip of a fictional audience seemingly cheering for West during the album's second listening event at Mercedes-Benz Stadium; footage is shown from the event of him ascending to the sky while wearing his black Donda vest. West then floats into computer-generated clouds, with him hovering around the atmosphere. The rapper is accompanied by a backdrop of footage and images of his mother Donda West from the one minute mark onwards, including her laughing and smiling. Religious imagery and concert footage are also displayed, while Kanye West goes on to rise above the clouds and reach an infinite universe. He appears to be ascending to heaven to meet Donda at one point and towards the music video's end, the clouds vanish into a digital void.

"24" was performed by the Sunday Service Choir as the closer to their Halloween concert at an anonymous rooftop location on October 31, 2021. During West and Canadian musician Drake's benefit concert for Larry Hoover's jail funds in Los Angeles on December 10, 2021, the musician opened his set with a cover of the song.

== Commercial performance ==
Following the release of Donda, "24" entered the US Billboard Hot 100 at number 43. Simultaneously, the track peaked at number 14 on both the US Christian Songs and Gospel Songs charts. On the Billboard year-end charts for 2021, the track ranked at numbers 52 and 17 on Christian Songs and Gospel Songs, respectively. On July 17, 2026, "24" received a gold certification from the Recording Industry Association of America (RIAA) for shelving 500,000 certified units in the United States. Elsewhere in North America, it reached number 43 on the Canadian Hot 100.

The song performed best in Australia, peaking at number 29 on the ARIA Singles Chart. Similarly, it debuted at number 36 on the Icelandic Singles Chart. The song was less successful in Lithuania and Portugal, reaching numbers 55 and 64 on the Lithuaniann Top 100 and AFP Top 100 Singles charts, respectively. On the Billboard Global 200, it debuted at number 40.

== Credits and personnel ==
Credits adapted from Tidal.

- Kanye West – producer, songwriter
- AllDay – producer, songwriter
- Ojivolta – producer, songwriter
- Warryn Campbell – co-producer, songwriter
- Cory Henry – co-producer, songwriter
- Jason White – vocal producer
- Nikki Grier – vocal producer
- KayCyy Pluto – songwriter, additional vocals
- Albert Daniels – songwriter
- Malik Yusef – songwriter
- Dexter Mills – songwriter
- Sunday Service Choir – additional vocals
- Irko – mastering engineer, mix engineer
- Alejandro Rodriguez-Dawsøn – recording engineer
- Josh Berg – recording engineer
- Mikalai Skrobat – recording engineer
- Louis Bell – vocal editing
- Patrick Hundley – vocal editing

== Charts ==
=== Weekly charts ===
Chart performance for "24"
Chart (2021)	Peak position
Australia (ARIA)	29
Canada Hot 100 (Billboard)	43
Global 200 (Billboard)	40
France (SNEP)	145
Iceland (Tónlistinn)	36
Lithuania (AGATA)	55
Portugal (AFP)	64
South Africa (TOSAC)	14
Sweden (Sverigetopplistan)	87
US Billboard Hot 100	43
US Hot Christian Songs (Billboard)	14
US Gospel Songs (Billboard)	14

=== Year-end charts ===
2021 year-end chart performance for "24"
Chart (2021)	Position
US Christian Songs (Billboard)	52
US Gospel Songs (Billboard)	17

== Certifications ==
Certifications for "24"
Region	Certification	Certified units/sales
United States (RIAA)	Gold	500,000^{‡}
^{‡} Sales+streaming figures based on certification alone.

== Notes and references ==
Notes

Citations
