= Praise God =

2021 song by Kanye West

Song by Kanye West featuring Travis Scott and Baby Keem

from the album Donda
- Released: August 29, 2021
- Recorded: January 28, 2020 – August 2021
- Genre: Hip-hop; trap
- Length: 3:46
- Label: GOOD; Def Jam
- Songwriters: Kanye West; Jacques Webster II; Hykeem Carter, Jr.; Samuel Gloade; Che Smith; Mark Williams; Raul Cubina; Anthony Khan; Aqeel Tate; Eric Sloan; Machiko Ryu; Kazuhiko Kato; Mark Mbogo; Malik Yusef
- Producers: Kanye West; 30 Roc; Ojivolta; The Twilite Tone; Zentachi; Mike Dean; Sloane

"Praise God" is a song by American rapper Kanye West from his tenth studio album Donda (2021). The song features fellow American rappers Travis Scott and Baby Keem. The intro and hook also samples a speech spoken by West's late mother, Donda West, after whom the album is named. The song peaked at number 20 on the US Billboard Hot 100, alongside reaching number 10 on the US Hot R&B/Hip-Hop Songs chart and the top of the US Gospel and Christian Songs charts.

== Background ==
The beat for "Praise God" was originally produced by 30 Roc and Zentachi in early 2020. The first version of the beat consisted of a sample of a Japanese song with a Spinz 808 pattern. At the first listening event in Atlanta, the sample was swapped out for a choir sample, and by the time of the second listening party, the drums and 808s Zen-tachi and 30 Roc added were taken out completely. Though most of the track was completely different from its original version, 30 Roc and Zen-tachi still received production credits for creating the original track that inspired the song. Japanese music producers Machiko Ryu and Kazuhiko Katō also received writing credits for writing the original song that was sampled.

KayCyy, who has writing credits on the track, talked about how the track came together in an interview with HipHopDX:

Even the grittiest side, it's still gospel. It's like 'Let's try to make gospel cooler, how can other people who may not listen to gospel music listen to it and still get the message?' That's what we were trying to crack with all of the hip hop sounding joints on there.

The song appeared on numerous track listing iterations for Donda revealed by West on July 18, 2020. The song was first played by West at the first listening event for Donda on July 22, 2021. In the following listening event on August 6, the track received some changes such as more organs being added and the percussion being altered. The first version previewed on had Travis Scott doing the first verses and the hook. On the second version, West cut some of Scott's lines out to fill himself in and substituted the entire hook with himself singing it. About collaborating with West, Keem wrote on Twitter: "Ye, an Idol, an Icon. Forever grateful for the experience of a lifetime".

== Composition and lyrics ==
Lyrically, "Praise God" sees West along with Scott and Baby Keem complimenting Jesus and what He has done for them. The song opens up with the former's late mother, Donda West, reciting an excerpt of Gwendolyn Brooks' poem, "Speech to the Young: Speech to the Progress-Toward", speaking: "Say to them, say to the down-keepers, the sun-slappers / The self-soilers, the harmony-hushers / Even if you are not ready for the day, it cannot always be night". It focuses on the people who think negatively about life, reminding them that they have a lot to be thankful for in life. The chorus sees West singing: "We gon' praise our way out the grave, dawg / Livin', speakin', praise God / Walkin' out the graveyard back to life / I serve, follow your word / See with new sight", before his mother finishes the last line of the chorus by saying, "Into the night". In the chorus, West focuses on turning his life around and putting his faith and trust in God to give what is right, which helps him see things in a more positive perspective. Scott also discusses his relationship with Christ in both of his verses. In Keem's verse, which closes the song, he raps the line: "Y'all treat your Lord and Savior like renter's insurance, you know what I mean?". He tries to call out the people that do not have belief in Christ's power until something bad happens to them, in which they rely on Him; he compares that to a person ignoring their renter's insurance until they need payment.

== Personnel ==
Credits adapted from Tidal.

- Kanye West – vocals, songwriting, production, programming, keyboards
- Travis Scott – uncredited vocals, songwriting
- Baby Keem – uncredited vocals, songwriting
- Donda West – additional vocals
- 30 Roc – production, songwriting, programming, keyboards
- Ojivolta
  - Mark Williams – production, songwriting, programming, keyboards
  - Raul Cubina – production, songwriting, programming, keyboards
- The Twilite Tone – co-production, songwriting
- Zentachi – co-production, songwriting
- Mike Dean – co-production
- Sloane – additional production, songwriting
- KayCyy – songwriting
- Maurizio "Irko" Sera – master engineering
- Mike Dean – master engineering
- Sean Solymar – mix engineering
- Tommy Rush – mix engineering
- Will Chason – record engineering
- Alejandro Rodriguez-Dawson – record engineering
- Devon Wilson – record engineering
- Josh Berg – record engineering
- Mikalai Skrobat – record engineering
- Roark Bailey – record engineering
- Louis Bell – vocal editing
- Patrick Hundley – vocal editing

== Charts ==
=== Weekly charts ===
Chart performance for "Praise God"
Chart (2021)	Peak position
Australia (ARIA)	13
Canada Hot 100 (Billboard)	17
Czech Republic Singles Digital (ČNS IFPI)	72
Denmark (Tracklisten)	23
France (SNEP)	76
Global 200 (Billboard)	17
Iceland (Tónlistinn)	13
Italy (FIMI)	70
Lithuania (AGATA)	24
Portugal (AFP)	34
Slovakia Singles Digital (ČNS IFPI)	43
South Africa (TOSAC)	4
UK Singles (Official Charts)	93
US Billboard Hot 100	20
US Hot Christian Songs (Billboard)	1
US Gospel Songs (Billboard)	1
US Hot R&B/Hip-Hop Songs (Billboard)	10

=== Year-end charts ===
2021 year-end chart performance for "Praise God"
Chart (2021)	Position
US Christian Songs (Billboard)	14
US Gospel Songs (Billboard)	5

== Certifications ==
Certifications for "Praise God"
Region	Certification	Certified units/sales
Canada (Music Canada)	Gold	40,000^{‡}
France (SNEP)	Gold	100,000^{‡}
Italy (FIMI)	Gold	50,000^{‡}
New Zealand (RMNZ)	Platinum	30,000^{‡}
Poland (ZPAV)	Platinum	50,000^{‡}
United Kingdom (BPI)	Silver	200,000^{‡}
United States (RIAA)	Platinum	1,000,000^{‡}
^{‡} Sales+streaming figures based on certification alone.
