= Believe What I Say =

Single by Kanye West

from the album Donda
- Released: November 30, 2021
- Recorded: September 2020 – August 2021
- Genre: Hip house
- Length: 4:02
- Label: GOOD; Def Jam
- Songwriters: Kanye West; Adam Wright; Anthony Reid; Billy Walsh; Cristi Gallo; Cydel Young; Dwayne Abernathy Jr.; Jahmal Gwin; Lauryn Hill; Malik Yusef; Mark Myrie; Mark Williams; Michael Mulé; Isaac De Boni; Raul Cubina
- Producers: Kanye West; Dem Jointz

Kanye West singles chronology
"Life of the Party" (2021)	"Believe What I Say" / "Off the Grid" (2021)	"Eazy" (2022)

"Believe What I Say" is a song by the American rapper Kanye West from his tenth studio album, Donda (2021). It features additional vocals from Buju Banton, Dem Jointz, and Stalone, and contains samples of "Doo Wop (That Thing)" by Lauryn Hill. It was serviced to US rhythmic contemporary radio as the album's third single on November 30, 2021 (second promoted to radio formats). West produced the track with Jointz and co-produced it alongside BoogzDaBeast, FnZ, and Ojivolta, with Antman Wonder adding additional production.

The song peaked at number 28 on the Billboard Hot 100, also reaching the top 40 in Australia and Canada.

== Background ==
On September 15, 2020, Kanye West posted a series of tweets about his relationship with Universal Music Group. In the tweets, the rapper expressed desire to buy back his master recordings. He went on to leak his full recording contract documents between himself and Universal. He also stated that he is "not putting no more music out until I'm done with my contract with Sony and Universal". The next day, West flew out to Jamaica and recorded music with Buju Banton and Saint Jhn, the former of which features on "Believe What I Say". West later shared a snippet of the song to his X account on September 26, featuring a video of him riding in a boat while out at sea.

== Composition and lyrics ==
Musically, "Believe What I Say" is a Hip house song with elements of R&B and soul. It features a prominent of sample of Lauryn Hill's 1998 song "Doo Wop (That Thing)", best heard in the intro, where she says "Yo, yo ... My men and my women" alongside cooing-like vocals. Critics generally considered the track to be uptempo, usually attributing this to the sample. It follows a four on the floor kick rhythm with minimal percussion and a bassline, which contrasts the "dusty"-sounding boom bap drums used on "Doo Wop (That Thing)".

The lyrics to "Believe What I Say" are focused on West reminding himself to not be dragged down by his fame. In the opening verse, West asserts that an individual needs "something unexpected" in the form of a "weapon", noting that they can ask a "him" to feel protected and actually feel it. West later clarifies that he does not support the "message" or "methods" of an unnamed third party. He references his estranged relationship with ex-wife Kim Kardashian, rapping that he is going through "celebrity drama that only Brad [Pitt]'ll know", seemingly in reference to Pitt's highly publicized divorce from actress Angelina Jolie. West furthers this by telling Kardashian that he "never questioned" her wants and gave her "everything" she asked for.

== Promotion and release ==
"Believe What I Say" was first previewed in full on August 26, 2021 at the Donda listening event at Soldier Field. The album was released onto streaming services three days later through GOOD Music, distributed by Def Jam, with "Believe What I Say" as its tenth track, though West claimed that he did not approve the release beforehand. On November 30, the song was serviced to US rhythmic contemporary radio as the album's third single overall, and was accompanied by the urban contemporary single "Off the Grid".

On September 9, composer Antman Wonder, who was initially uncredited on the song, posted an older version of it, claiming that he had composed the outro and that West had not properly credited his and several other artists's contributions to Donda. The credits were later updated to include him.

== Credits and personnel ==
- Kanye West – production, vocals, songwriting
- Dem Jointz – production, additional vocals, record engineering, songwriting
- Buju Banton – additional vocals, songwriting
- BoogzDaBeast – co-production, songwriting
- FnZ – co-production, songwriting
- Ojivolta – co-production, songwriting
- Antman Wonder – additional production, songwriting
- Stalone – additional vocals, songwriting
- Irko – mix engineering, master engineering
- Devon Wilson – record engineering
- Mikalai Skrobat – record engineering
- Josh Berg – record engineering
- Preston Reid – record engineering
- Louis Bell – vocal editing
- Patrick Hundley – vocal editing

== Charts ==
=== Weekly charts ===
Chart performance for "Believe What I Say"
Chart (2021–2022)	Peak position
Australia (ARIA)	17
Canada Hot 100 (Billboard)	29
France (SNEP)	102
Global 200 (Billboard)	26
South Africa (TOSAC)	17
US Billboard Hot 100	28
US Hot Christian Songs (Billboard)	8
US Gospel Songs (Billboard)	7
US Hot R&B/Hip-Hop Songs (Billboard)	15
US Rhythmic Airplay (Billboard)	20

=== Year-end charts ===
2021 year-end chart performance for "Believe What I Say"
Chart (2021)	Position
US Christian Songs (Billboard)	38
US Gospel Songs (Billboard)	10

== Certifications ==
Certifications for "Believe What I Say"
Region	Certification	Certified units/sales
New Zealand (RMNZ)	Gold	15,000^{‡}
United States (RIAA)	Gold	500,000^{‡}
^{‡} Sales+streaming figures based on certification alone.
