= Donda =

- The Donda album art, a plain black square (Note: The color code of the album art is not exactly black (#000000) but instead #020305)

Studio album by Kanye West
- Released: August 29, 2021
- Recorded: November 2019 – August 2021
- Studios: Bighorn Mountain Ranch (Greybull, Wyoming); Gargamel Music (Kingston, Jamaica); Island Sound (Honolulu); Pio Pico Art Gallery (Los Angeles); Mercedes-Benz Stadium (Atlanta); St. Regis San Francisco (San Francisco); Hyde Street Studios (San Francisco)
- Genres: Hip-hop; Christian hip-hop; gospel; progressive rap; pop
- Length: 108:48; 130:52 (deluxe edition)
- Labels: GOOD; Def Jam
- Producers: Kanye West; 30 Roc; 88-Keys; All Day; Angel Lopez; Arrow; AyoAA; Boi-1da; BoogzDaBeast; Cirkut; Cory Henry; Cubeatz; Dem Jointz; Digital Nas; DJ Khalil; DrtWrk; E.Vax; Federico Vindver; Fonzworth Bentley; Gesaffelstein; Jeff Bhasker; Louis Bell; Mike Dean; Ojivolta; Ronny J; Sean Leon; Swizz Beatz; Teddy Walton; Timbaland; TT Audi; the Twilite Tone; Warryn Campbell; Wheezy

Kanye West chronology
Jesus Is King (2019)	Donda (2021)	Donda 2 (2022)

Singles from Donda
- 1. "Hurricane" Released: September 14, 2021; 2. "Believe What I Say" Released: November 30, 2021; 3. "Off the Grid" Released: November 30, 2021

Singles from Donda (Deluxe)
- 1. "Life of the Party" Released: November 14, 2021

Donda is the tenth studio album by the American rapper Kanye West. It was released through GOOD Music and Def Jam Recordings on August 29, 2021. Donda was primarily produced by West, BoogzDaBeast, Dem Jointz, Mike Dean, and Ojivolta, and most of the material was recorded between November 2019 and August 2021. It includes credited guest appearances from the Weeknd and Lil Baby, and uncredited features from Jay-Z, Marilyn Manson, Kid Cudi, Travis Scott, Lil Yachty, Baby Keem, Playboi Carti, Jay Electronica, DaBaby, Roddy Ricch, Ty Dolla Sign, Fivio Foreign, Lil Durk, Pop Smoke, the Lox, Shenseea, Westside Gunn, Conway the Machine, Young Thug, and KayCyy; the deluxe edition adds André 3000 and Tyler, the Creator.

Donda's sound has been described as an amalgamation of West's previous albums, including 808s & Heartbreak (2008), My Beautiful Dark Twisted Fantasy (2010), Yeezus (2013), and Jesus Is King (2019). It encompasses hip-hop, gospel, progressive rap, and pop, with elements of trap and drill. West's longest album, Donda explores his Christian faith, righteousness, his estrangement from his then-wife Kim Kardashian, and his late mother Donda West, for whom the album is named. It is both minimalist and maximalist, with darker lyrical content and production than many of West's prior works, in addition to reduced drums and most instances of profanity being censored.

West promoted Donda with large-scale listening parties at stadiums throughout the US. "Hurricane" was released as the lead single in September 2021, followed by "Life of the Party", "Believe What I Say", and "Off the Grid" in November. Donda polarized music critics, who generally considered it an improvement from Jesus Is King and praised the composition, but were divided over its cohesiveness and criticized the long runtime. DaBaby and Marilyn Manson's appearances generated controversy due to the allegations of homophobia and sexual abuse against them, respectively. Nonetheless, several publications named Donda one of 2021's best albums. It was nominated for Album of the Year and Best Rap Album at the 64th Grammy Awards, and "Jail" and "Hurricane" won for Best Rap Song and Best Melodic Rap Performance, respectively.

Donda received the most first-day streams for an album in 2021 on both Apple Music and Spotify. It was West's tenth consecutive album to debut at number one on the US Billboard 200, tying the record set by Eminem. It topped the charts in 18 other regions, including France, Australia, and the United Kingdom. It has platinum certification by the Recording Industry Association of America (RIAA), and received gold certification in Canada and New Zealand by Music Canada and Recorded Music NZ. In October 2021, West and Kano Computing released the Donda Stem Player, allowing users to remix Donda's songs. The deluxe edition, with five additional songs, was released on November 14. Donda was West's final album released through a major label; he began releasing music independently with Donda 2 (2022).

== Background ==
During a conversation with French fashion designer Michèle Lamy in an Instagram Live stream on May 25, 2020, American cinematographer Arthur Jafa revealed that he was working on video material with West for a single from his forthcoming album, titled God's Country. On July 21, West confirmed the album title had been changed to Donda in honor of his mother, after whom he had also named his creative company. The album had its name briefly changed to Donda: With Child, which was later reversed. West announced a release date of July 24, and posted a track listing for the album. In the following days, West continued to post track listings, only to subsequently delete them. Ultimately, the album missed its planned release date. In September 2020, West sent out a series of tweets about his relationship with Universal Music Group, mostly addressing his desire to buy his master recordings back from them. The rapper asserted that these efforts were obstructed by his signed contracts, succeeding this by tweeting multiple images that supposedly showed the contracts.

Since his tweet that announces his 2024's run for presidency on November 4, 2020, West went radio silent for the entirety of the album's promotion; not saying anything on social media and wearing a full face mask in public. Information about the album and its listening events was relayed through fellow collaborators such as Consequence, Malik Yusef, Justin LaBoy, and Pusha T. West's manager Abou "Bu" Thiam teased the release of Donda on June 8, 2021, commenting on Gap's Instagram post announcing their jacket with Yeezy, "WestDayEver. Album OTW!" On July 17, Consequence posted a video of West in the studio with Tyler, the Creator on Instagram, suggesting a summer 2021 album release in the caption. On July 19, Pusha T announced on Instagram that West would be holding a listening event for the album at Mercedes-Benz Stadium in Atlanta on July 22. On July 21, West reinstated his Instagram account to share a series of images, alongside a commercial, featuring Sha'Carri Richardson, scored by the song, "No Child Left Behind", teasing a release date of July 23.

== Recording ==
The recording sessions began a month after Jesus Is King was released. Producer BoogzDaBeast recalled that he was called in to Wyoming with West telling him "Man we're going back in, we're about to do a new album. Let's keep this going." BoogzDaBeast came to Wyoming with 166 beats, which he later clarified were mostly unfinished ideas. Of those 166 ideas, West freestyled over 99 of them in what the producer calls "That One Night in Wyoming". Songs such as "Wash Us in the Blood"–which was initially set for release on Donda in 2020, but was left off the final album–and "Lord I Need You" were originally conceived during said session.

In March 2020, West recorded new music in Cabo San Lucas, Mexico, before returning to Wyoming with his family due to the COVID-19 pandemic. That same month, GOOD Music president Pusha T stated in a Discord interview that he had been recording with West recently. Pusha T was planning to meet with West on March 16, 2020, to complete a project, but cited "flights slowing down" due to COVID travel restrictions as the reason for a delay. On March 12, 2020, rappers Westside Gunn and Conway the Machine were spotted in Wyoming recording material with West. Westside Gunn would later confirm his collaboration with West in an interview for Elliot Wilson on Tidal, alongside recalling that they were set to travel to Cabo San Lucas after recording in Wyoming, until the COVID-19 pandemic canceled their plans. West held further recording sessions at Bighorn Mountain Ranch in Greybull, Wyoming, which he bought for $14.5 million. The ranch spans over 6,700 acres, covering a larger area than the Monster Lake Ranch property in Wyoming that West previously bought. West flew Lil Baby out to Wyoming to record for Donda on July 22, 2020, following on from him tweeting, "Lil Baby my favorite rapper but won't do a song with me." The rapper ended up recording his verse for "Hurricane" after Kenyan-American rapper KayCyy suggested to him that he should contribute to it. In September 2020, West recorded music with Buju Banton and Saint Jhn at Gargamel Studio in Jamaica.

On March 8, 2021, Cyhi the Prynce stated in an interview with VladTV that West had resumed work on Donda amid his divorce from his wife Kim Kardashian. On May 30, West was joined in the studio by fellow rapper Playboi Carti. On June 14, 2021, court documents were obtained revealing that West was recording for the album in Honolulu, Hawaii, where he held sessions at Island Sound Studio, after reportedly "freaking out" during his deposition in an ongoing lawsuit with tech company MyChannel. Singer-songwriter Syleena Johnson worked on music in San Francisco around a month later, indicating via an Instagram post that she was collaborating with West. Speaking for Cocktails with Queens on Fox Soul, Johnson said she recorded the song "Donda Chant" as well as vocals for another track that ended up not getting used, in said session.

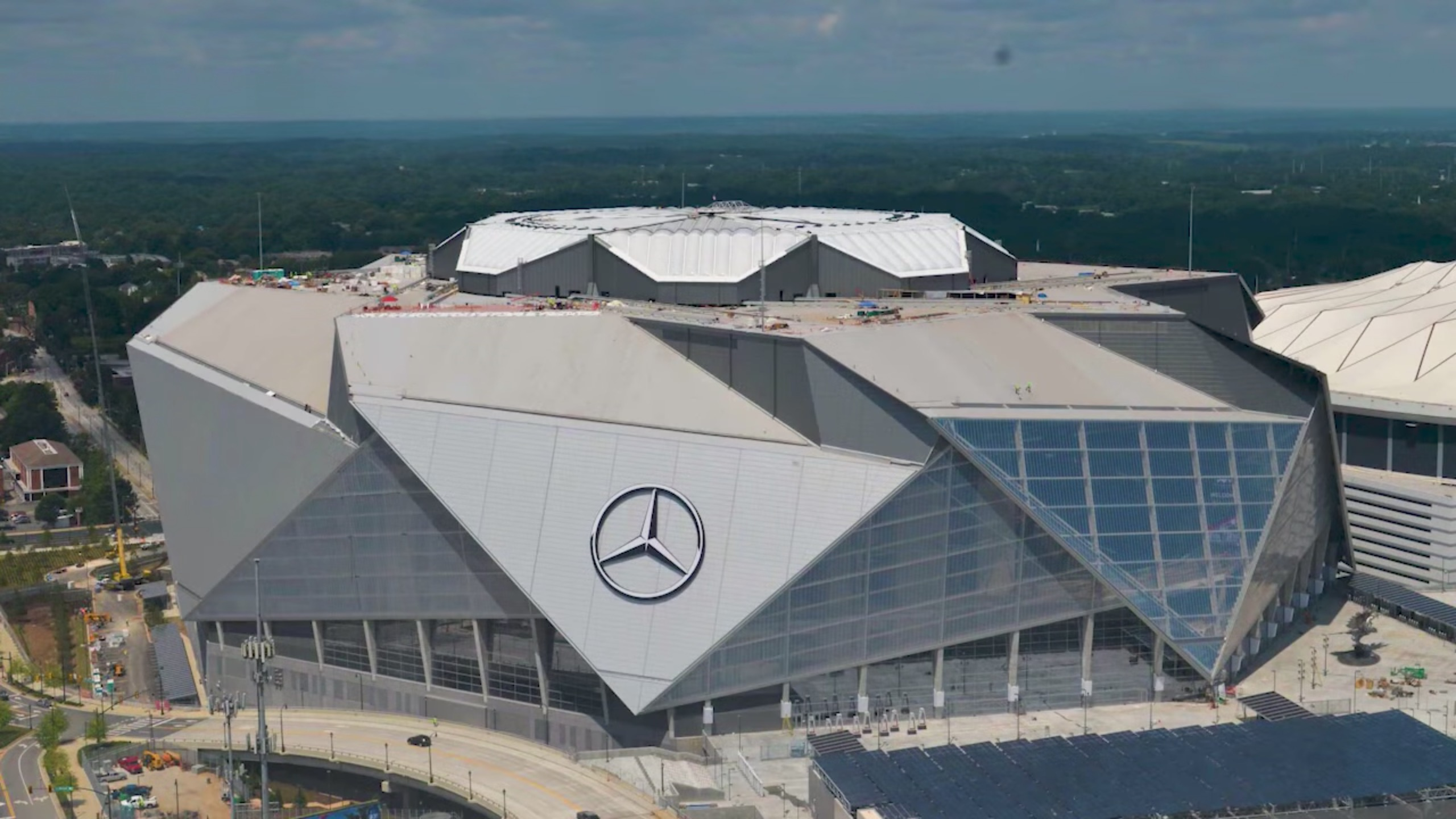
West held recording sessions inside Mercedes-Benz Stadium, taking up temporary residence in the locker rooms for studio spaces and living areas.

After holding a listening event for Donda at Mercedes-Benz Stadium on July 22, 2021, West took up temporary residence in one of the locker rooms, converting it into a studio for finishing the recording and mixing with producer Mike Dean. Playboi Carti, Jay-Z and 2 Chainz joined West for recording in the room, with West posting a photo to Instagram of himself and the former there a day before the event. Jay-Z reportedly recorded his verse for "Jail" mere hours prior to the listening event. After failing to meet the album's scheduled release date of July 23, West continued to record and live in Mercedes-Benz Stadium up until the second listening party held there on August 5, 2021. 24 hours before the second listening event commenced, West and several other artists could be seen recording among doing numerous other activities during an Apple Music livestream.

=== Songs ===
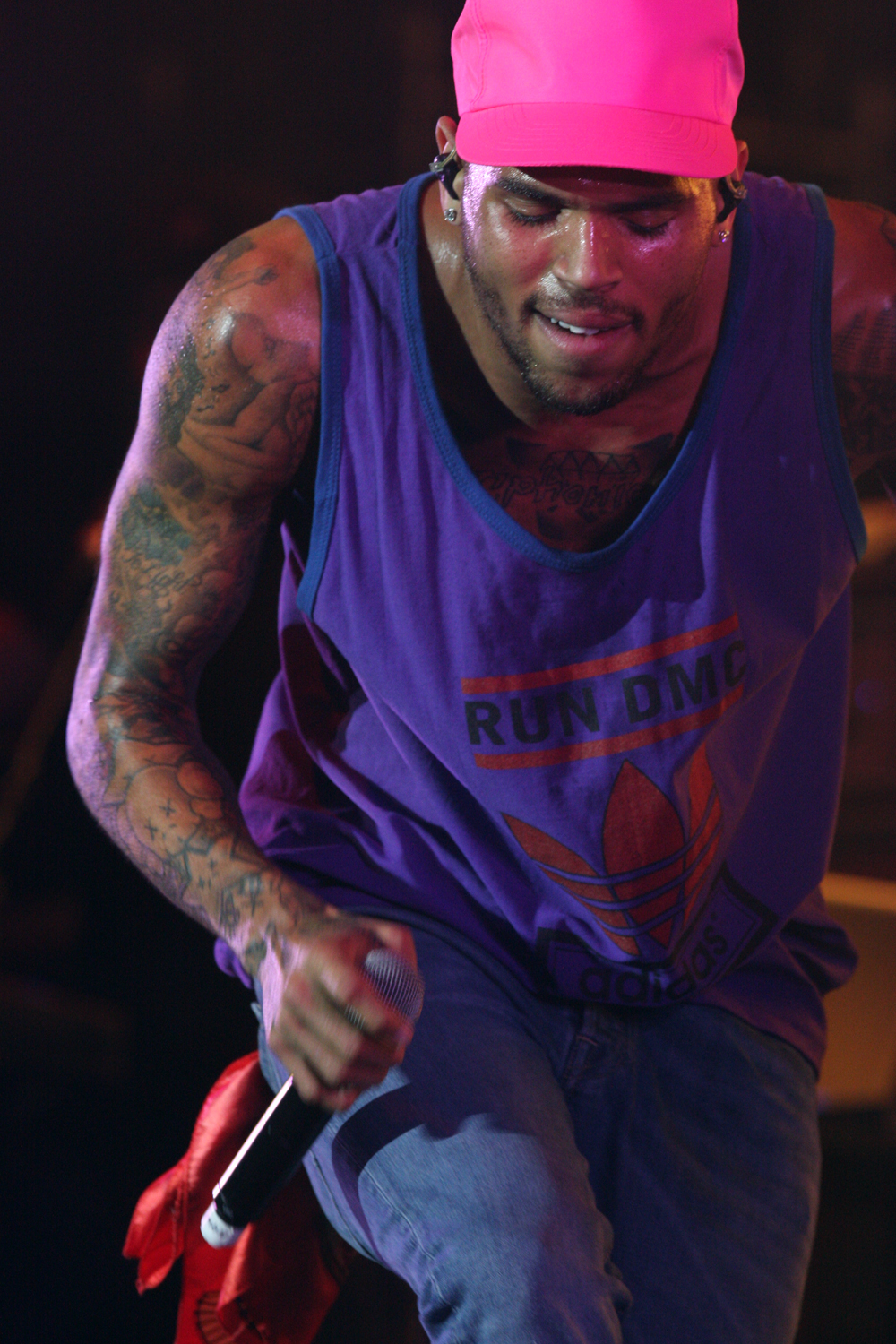
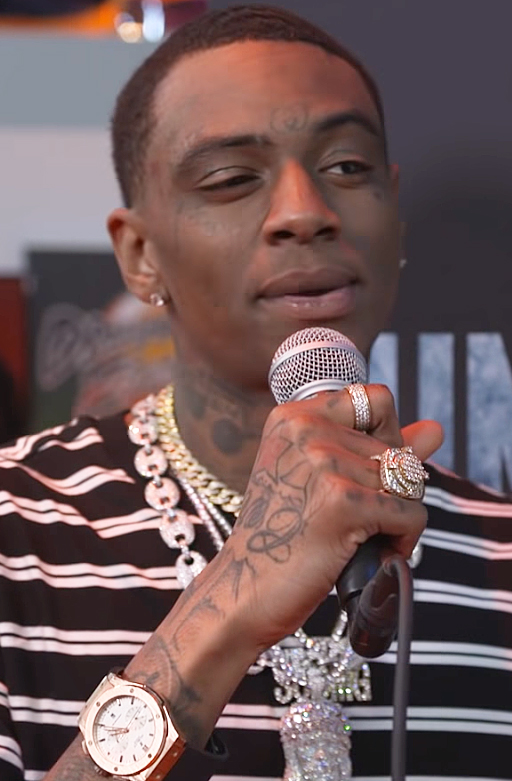
Chris Brown (left) and Soulja Boy (right) both publicly made comments aimed at West due to the controversial removal of their respective verses from the album.

"Hurricane" was originally previewed via Instagram by West in September 2018 and also leaked online, initially being intended for his scrapped album Yandhi. After the song was first previewed, it went through various iterations, with contributions from artists such as KayCyy, Big Sean, and American musician Ty Dolla Sign, of which the latter would feature on "Junya pt 2". However, none of their contributions made the final cut of "Hurricane", and they would be replaced with Lil Baby and Canadian singer the Weeknd. A song titled "Never Abandon Your Family" was previewed at the first two listening events for Donda on July 22 and August 6, 2021. Although the song was not included on the first version of the album, it later appeared on the deluxe edition. "Donda", which was initially titled "South Carolina" when previewed at the aforementioned listening parties, originally featured a verse where West traded bars with Pusha T. The verse contained references to West's South Carolina rally from his 2020 presidential campaign.

The song "New Again", featuring vocals from R&B singer Chris Brown on the chorus, originally included a verse performed by the singer that he later leaked, after publicly calling West a "whole hoe". Several critics expressed negative responses to West's choice to remove the verse, including the co-host of The Breakfast Club, Charlamagne tha God, that defined the verse discard as a "poor choice musically". On September 28, 2021, the song was updated on streaming services, with Brown being replaced by West and the Sunday Service Choir. Rapper Soulja Boy originally recorded a verse for the track "Remote Control", although he was not included on the final version of the song, being replaced with fellow rapper Young Thug. Following the album's release, Soulja Boy shared a snippet of his verse to Twitter, with the caption of the post reading, "Fuck Kanye". In November 2021, West apologized to Soulja Boy for removing the verse without informing him, though insisted he did so because it was bad. Fellow rapper André 3000 also recorded a verse for a then unreleased track entitled "Life of the Party", which had been previewed at a listening event for Donda in Las Vegas. In the song, West disses Canadian musician Drake, who leaked the song in retaliation amidst a feud between them. André 3000 lamented the feud, stating that his verse was written before West's diss. The song was later released on the deluxe version of the album, with the Drake diss replaced by an alternate verse from West.

On September 7, 2021, DJ Akademiks shared a screenshot of a conversation between West and an unnamed engineer that worked on Donda, showing West firing the engineer after no response to his morning message to start work. On September 14, 2021, American multi-instrumentalist Todd Rundgren revealed he had recorded heavily for it and was tolerant of West delving into different subjects, but became frustrated with the rapper after a lack of feedback about his material. Rundgren also assumed it should be made clear if he can contribute or not and saw "a possibility" he is "actually in there somewhere" among the album's "junk", concluding by branding West "a dilettante". On September 24, 2021, after multiple artists had revealed that contributions to Donda from them were scrapped, West's sound engineer Nikolai Skrobat revealed that an upcoming playlist consisting of "forgotten tracks" from West's discography may include the album's unreleased material. West incorporated an unused Donda track, "Beauty and the Beast", in his 2026 album Bully.

== Music and lyrics ==
Donda covers the stylistic groundwork of West's previous albums; it has been described as a hip-hop, gospel, progressive rap, and pop record, while the album also includes elements of trap, drill, boom bap, hip house, and rock. Writing for the Los Angeles Times, Mikael Wood described it as a blend of Yeezus's rough industrial hip-hop, the "church-organ gospel" of West's previous studio album Jesus Is King (2019), the "gothic swagger" of My Beautiful Dark Twisted Fantasy (2010), and the "bleeping" electropop of 808s & Heartbreak (2008). Spencer Kornhaber of The Atlantic perceived that "stylistic innovation has driven West's career" continuously, but he possibly "conceives of Donda as the album of his life—a capstone, an anthology". However, the album is unusual in his catalog due to its lack of drums, outside of a light amount of snares and occasional synth basses that imitate rhythm sections. Donda's integration of gospel music is more subtle than that of its predecessor, instead favoring the usage of trap beats and Auto-Tune. At Pitchfork, Dylan Green noted the production "jumps" from trap and drill to boom-bap and gospel, invoking GOOD Music's compilation album Cruel Summer (2012).

According to Ed Power of The Daily Telegraph, the album is a maximalist hip-hop record that follows a "more is more" philosophy through its "gleaming, swooping grooves and several kitchen sinks worth of production"; he noted how the grooves "go off" similarly to monster trucks moving loudly around a stadium. In contrast, Craig Jenkins of Vulture said that Donda's "unifying quality is a subtle minimalism", with prominent silence. Fred Thomas of AllMusic similarly opined that the album is built on "minimal arrangements that linger while feeling eerily unfinished". Jenkins also noticed West's diminished presence on the record, where he felt his "raps and hooks take up significantly less real estate" than any releases of his since Cruel Summer. In The Sydney Morning Herald, Michael Dwyer wrote that the "gospel flourishes of organ and voices" on Donda are elevated by "passionate yearning". Donda is West's longest album, with a runtime of an hour and 48 minutes. According to TheGrio, its length follows the tendency of lengthier albums in the music streaming era started by Chris Brown's 2017 album Heartbreak on a Full Moon. Green said Donda contains "euphoric highs" with a lack of "connective tissue", observing "a data dump of songs searching for a higher calling". Gigwise writer Charlie Brock depicted that the album "ebbs and flows", being "melancholic and subversive" at some points, and "outlandish and snarling" at others.

Donda was inspired by religion, being themed around West's faith across much of the material. Some critics have described the album as sombre, with darker lyrical content than West's previous works. For Exclaim!, Riley Wallace asserted that it is a lot less clumsy than Jesus Is King and also a "more accessible body of work". References to addiction and mental instability are prominent, as well as Kanye West's ego and his family, including the collapse of his marriage with Kardashian and thoughts about Donda. Themes of hope, rebirth, and salvation are also present. Jon Caramanica wrote for The New York Times that in Donda, West continues to trade off the lyrical focus on self-awareness and wordplay of his earlier material for a more "terse and immediate approach, one that complements his musical shifts toward the industrial and the spiritual", which he started to do in the 2010s. In the same vein as Jesus Is King, Donda features no explicit language, with all expletives being edited out.

== Songs ==
The album's opening track, "Donda Chant", consists of Syleena Johnson chanting Donda West's forename repeatedly for nearly a minute. It has been theorized by fans that the rhythm represents that of Donda West's heart beating. "Jail" follows and is the first full track, featuring Kanye West and Jay-Z combining metaphors about crime with details of marriage and sin. The track is a fusion of "maximalist hip hop", pop, and alternative rock, incorporating auto-tuned vocals and arena rock guitar riffs. The song contains almost no drums, until the last segment of the track brings a "brief, stilted drum pattern", described as industrial percussion. "God Breathed" has an abrasive, industrial sound that was compared to Yeezus, and features West offering redemption, reaffirming his trust in God before a wordless choir performs the outro. Playboi Carti and fellow rapper Fivio Foreign attempt to find a balance between faith in themselves and faith in God within their verses on "Off the Grid", later being followed by West providing a revelation of his religious mission statement in the closing verse and at one point, he dubs God "my bestie". The song has an intense drill beat, featuring a "melodically complex" bassline and a "sustained choir". "Hurricane" is an R&B song, with layered organs and processed choir vocals that are cut akin to a sample. West touches on personal issues such as his breakup with Kardashian and his house, while the hook sees the Weeknd exude confidence and Lil Baby provides a mournful performance. "Praise God" contains a vocal sample of Donda West proclaiming, "Even if you are not ready for the day, it cannot always be night." Lyrically, the song features Baby Keem mixing "worship with the dark carnality of the mosh pit" and Kanye West connecting his issues to God's mysterious behavior. "Jonah" sees him rapping about his relationship with God, alongside fellow rappers Vory and Lil Durk opening up about their pain of losing friends and family members, respectively.

"Ok Ok" includes West commanding his status, while fellow rapper Lil Yachty boasts about sexual action. "Junya" is a tribute to Japanese fashion designer Junya Watanabe and features a skeletal arrangement of handclaps, organs, and heavy bass. It contains a Drake diss from West, with him alluding to Certified Lover Boy's delayed release. On "Believe What I Say", described as hip house, R&B, and soul, West offers a reminder to not let fame drag him down and references Kardashian. West and the Sunday Service Choir provide worship on "24", which features him delivering a message of hope in relation to God, backed by a discordant organ played by Cory Henry. "Remote Control" has an instrumental with a whistling hook over which West comments on technology and its infiltration of life, while Young Thug boasts about his property. On "Moon", rapper Kid Cudi provides a wistful performance. Throughout "Heaven and Hell", West lets out his thoughts on Jeff Bezos, vinyl, and modern culture. "Donda" contains a vocal sample of a speech by West's mother of the same name, who talks about him being a genius; the speech precedes a Christian worship moment from The World Famous Tony Williams. On the boom bap track "Keep My Spirit Alive", West claims to be anti-commercial and links his problems with the behavior of God. "Jesus Lord" is Donda's centerpiece and Kanye West details the story of how he changed from who he used to be in his verse, as well as questioning if he will go to heaven and see Donda there. Rapper Jay Electronica then offers a cryptic worldview based on various points, before the song ends with the son of gang leader Larry Hoover thanking West for taking his father's case to the White House of 2017–2021 US president Donald Trump.

"New Again"
An 18-second sample of the original version of "New Again", a hip house track that features West and Chris Brown touching on salvation and offering repentance, tying in with the religious theme of Donda.

Throughout the hip house track "New Again", West searches for salvation and showcases awareness of religion's trappings. The first version featured Brown crooning repentance for everything he will do again on the chorus, though the update replaced him with West and the Sunday Service Choir. "Tell the Vision" serves as an interlude and is an alternate take on the song of the same name from the 2021 album Faith by rapper Pop Smoke, who is the sole performer on the interlude. On "Lord I Need You", West goes in detail about divorcing Kardashian and at one point, he begs God to "wrap your arms around me in mercy". Within "Pure Souls", religious ideas are expressed and West declares there is a new version of him to adapt to, while Roddy Ricch wonders about truth on the hook. West sings about the emotional fallout from getting divorced on "Come to Life", alongside assuring that he is connected with God. "No Child Left Behind" is Donda's final original track and features Vory uttering the titular phrase in reference to the educational act signed by 2001–2009 US president George W. Bush, as well as West singing about the guidance and strength that he has received from God.

The last four tracks on Donda are either alternate or extended versions of preceding songs. "Jail pt 2" features an additional verse from DaBaby, who confirms his stance on gay people, complains about financial issues, and references his daughters. Singer Marilyn Manson also appears on the version, singing along with West at a few points. "Ok Ok pt 2" and "Junya pt 2" include further contributions from Shenseea and Ty Dolla Sign, respectively. Extra verses are performed on "Jesus Lord pt 2" by each member of the Lox, with them opening up about their connections to different gods.

== Release and promotion ==
On June 26, 2020, West unveiled a collaboration between his fashion company Yeezy and clothing retailer Gap, and also launched the #WestDayEver promotional campaign on Twitter that accompanied announcements of different projects. One of the projects was a music video for the track "Wash Us in the Blood" that features fellow rapper Travis Scott, directed by Jafa; the video was released simultaneously with the song on June 30, following a teaser in which West officially announced the album's title as God's Country. The track was set to be included on Donda, but did not appear on the final track listing. On July 13, 2020, Kanye shared a snippet on Twitter of a song titled "Donda", which featured his late mother Donda West reciting KRS-One's "Sound of da Police" (1993) and was accompanied by archival footage, including the Wests rapping together. The song was replaced with another track also titled "Donda" on the final track listing. On September 26, 2020, West shared a 39-second snippet of the track "Believe What I Say" to Twitter. West later released a song entitled "Nah Nah Nah" on October 26, calling the song his 2020 presidential campaign's theme music; it includes him referencing his candidacy. On November 13, 2020, West released a remix of "Nah Nah Nah" that features fellow rappers DaBaby and 2 Chainz. After the original and remix were both removed from streaming services in the lead up to Donda's release, neither of them made the final cut.

On July 20, 2021, Audio products company Beats by Dre premiered a commercial during game six of the 2021 NBA Finals with athlete Sha'Carri Richardson, scored by West's track "No Child Left Behind". The commercial also showed the release date for Donda as July 23, 2021, and marked one of the first snippets of the music. French producer Gesaffelstein later revealed that he produced the song, marking his second time working with West after having previously contributed to the rapper's sixth studio album Yeezus (2013). Directly after the commercial's debut, Def Jam reaffirmed the album's release date.

In late July 2021, a representative for West announced a release date of August 6 for Donda, which was later confirmed via both a Beats by Dre commercial and West's Apple Music livestream. A day prior to this, a pre-order for the album was launched on iTunes, revealing it to feature 24 songs, along with a release date of August 27, 2021, before the date was revised to six days later. Conflictingly, Apple Music displayed the release date to be August 15, before one set for five days later appeared on the service. On August 20, 2021, the service listed a release date of August 28, one day after Donda's third listening party; Thiam reaffirmed that the release would come after the event. A day before the scheduled release, Donda's release date experienced another pushback on Apple Music, setting it to coincide with the release of Drake's sixth studio album Certified Lover Boy on September 3, 2021. It was speculated across social media that the delay was intentional to increase competition between the two artists.

On August 29, 2021, Donda was released by GOOD Music, distributed by Def Jam, succeeding several delays during that month. It stood as West's last release with the latter label, after his contract expired. "Jail pt 2" was originally not able to be played, showing up on the Spotify version of the album as an "unavailable" track, after DaBaby's manager had not cleared his verse prior to release. Hours after its official release, West claimed that Universal Music had released Donda without his approval and blocked "Jail pt 2" from appearing on the album. The song later became available on streaming services, including Tidal and Spotify. Universal Music denied both releasing the album without West's approval and blocking the release of "Jail pt 2", with an anonymous source at the company calling his claims "preposterous".

On September 3, 2021, "Hurricane" was playlisted by Swedish mainstream station Sveriges Radio P3. The song was sent to American rhythmic contemporary radio stations by GOOD Music and Def Jam as the lead single from Donda on September 14, 2021. Following the album's release, the song entered the US Billboard Hot 100 at number six, giving West his 19th top-10 hit on the chart. It was certified platinum by the Recording Industry Association of America (RIAA) for amassing 1,000,000 certified units in the US on January 10, 2022. "Hurricane" reached number 12 on the Swedish Singles Chart, with it debuting five places higher on the UK Singles Chart. On November 30, 2021, "Believe What I Say" and "Off the Grid" were released as singles to US rhythmic and urban contemporary radio stations, respectively, through Good Music and Def Jam. On the Hot 100, the former charted at number 28. "Off the Grid" debuted at number 11 on the chart, alongside reaching number 15 on the UK Singles Chart. On November 8, 2021, the song was awarded a gold certification by the RIAA for pushing 500,000 certified units in the US.

West purchased many large billboards to advertise Donda in Drake's hometown of Toronto during September 2021, outnumbering the ones used for Certified Lover Boy on the day of its release. A music video for "Come to Life" was released on September 2, 2021. The visual features footage from the album's third listening event at Soldier Field, showing West setting on fire then reuniting with Kardashian. A music video for "24" was released two weeks after the one for "Come to Life", and begins with footage from Donda's second Mercedes-Benz Stadium listening event of West ascending towards the sky, before he rises above the stadium and floats around among clouds. A clip for "Donda Chant" was shared exclusively to Instagram by West on September 19, 2021. The black-and-white visual incorporates aerial footage from the album's Soldier Field listening event that shows the replica of Kanye West's childhood home, on which flashes of old pictures of Donda are projected. On October 16, 2021, West performed a four-song set for Tiffany & Co. executive Alexandre Arnault and D'estree founder Geralde Guyot after their wedding in Venice, Italy, which included "Come to Life" and "Believe What I Say". He debuted a music video for "Heaven and Hell" during the College Football Playoff National Championship game on January 10, 2022. The visual has a night setting and shows people wearing new Yeezy Gap hoodies wandering around a city; it concludes with floating bodies spiralling through the skies.

=== Cover art ===
Initial cover art, shared by West in July 2020 and designed by Pierre-Louis Auvray

Second proposed cover, showcasing an adaptation of a Louise Bourgeois painting from 2007

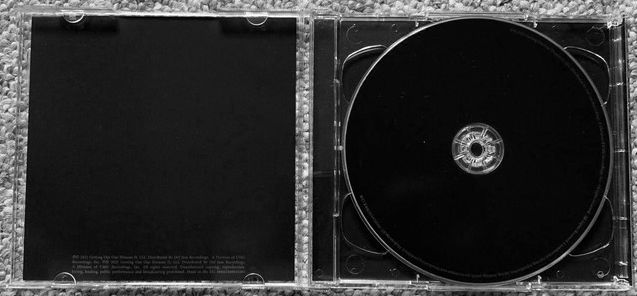
The opened CD jewel case of Donda which, including the disc itself, is entirely plain black

On July 25, 2020, West tweeted out an album cover, showing an infrared scheme of orange and red mirroring the shape of the people, sun, and moon in the sky, backed by green mountains alongside purple and white clouds designed by Pierre-Louis Auvray. In the lead up to the first Donda listening event on July 22, 2021, a possible replacement cover was used as the promo artwork. The cover was an adaptation of a Louise Bourgeois gouache painting that had been created in 2007, the same year as Donda West's death, and included in Bourgeois' series Les têtes bleues et les femmes rouges (2015). In the painting, a woman is shown in monochromatic red and a matching ponytail flows behind her, while a fertility idol is also partially present. After Kanye West posted numerous potential covers, a plain black square was ultimately used as the artwork for the album.

=== Streaming performance and updates ===
In its first day of release, Donda earned the second-biggest global Spotify debut for album streams ever, with nearly 100 million streams, and broke the record for the biggest first day streams of 2021 on the service that was set by Olivia Rodrigo's Sour. The album also set a new record by reaching number one on Apple Music's top albums chart in 152 countries in its first day, and earned the third-biggest first day debut streams for an album. Donda broke the 2021 record for the most-streamed album in one day on Apple Music, while 19 of the top-20 tracks on the service's Top 100 Global songs chart were from the album. Donda amassed 60 million first day streams in the United States on Apple, setting a streaming record for 2021 in the country. After eight days of streaming, it had reached around 423 million on-demand audio streams in the US. 25 of the tracks debuted with the top-40 of Spotify's U.S. chart, with 10 of them occupying the top-10. The album's 2021 record for first day Spotify streams was broken by Certified Lover Boy, which also surpassed its eight-day total of US on-demand audio streams within three days, amassing over 430 million streams. By October 26, the former had amassed over a billion streams on Spotify, becoming West's fastest album to achieve this milestone.

On September 28, 2021, West released an updated version of Donda separately from the original on streaming services. The changes included the removal of KayCyy and Brown from "Keep My Spirit Alive" and "New Again", respectively; Brown's writing credits were also removed from the latter. West replaced KayCyy on the former, while he and the Sunday Service Choir appeared in place of Brown on "New Again".

=== Donda Stem Player ===
On August 25, 2021, West announced the Donda Stem Player via his website, a standalone music player allowing users to remix the album's songs using their stems. Users are also given the ability to control vocals, drums, bass, and samples, isolate parts, and add effects. The player was announced as being set to be released by West's brand Yeezy Tech in collaboration with Kano Computing and sold for $200. On October 27, 2021, the Donda Stem Player was made available by West, with three extra songs being included. The new songs are a censored edit of "Life of the Party", "Up from the Ashes", and an updated version of "Never Abandon Your Family". In addition, the player contains a version of "Remote Control" that re-adds Kid Cudi's original contribution. On November 17, 2021, the Donda Stem Player website was updated to include downloadable stems for Jesus Is King. On December 10, 2021, stems for "Wash Us in the Blood" were added in an update.

In February 2022, West announced that the sequel to Donda would be exclusively released onto the Stem Player.

=== Deluxe edition ===
On November 5, 2021, in an interview with N.O.R.E. on Drink Champs, West announced that a deluxe version of Donda was set to be released, teasing a song called "Let Go". Eight days later, billboards advertising the deluxe edition appeared around Los Angeles. On November 14, 2021, Donda (Deluxe) was released to streaming services. Simultaneously, an explicit version of "Life of the Party" was released as a single from the deluxe edition. The song charted at number 13 on the US Bubbling Under Hot 100 chart. A 2xCD physical version of the deluxe edition was released on February 11, 2022. A 4xLP deluxe gatefold version was released on vinyl on June 24, 2022.

== Listening events ==
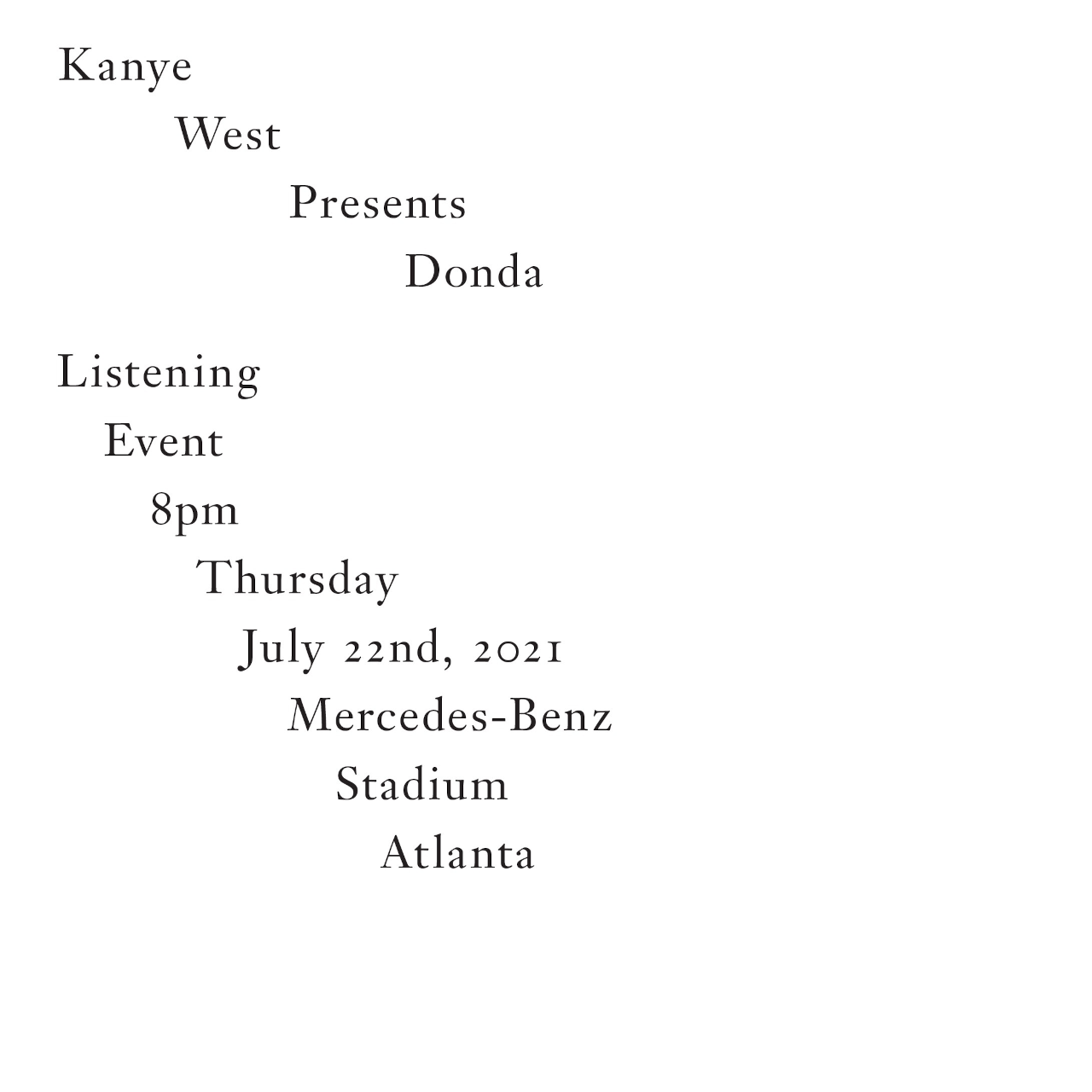
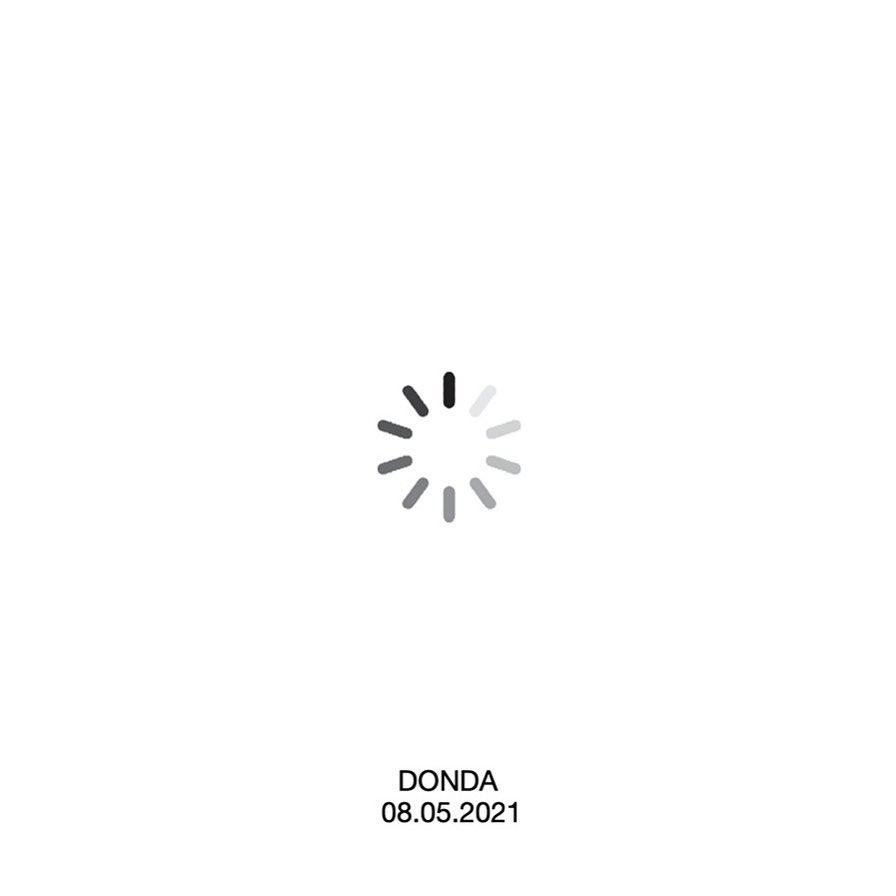
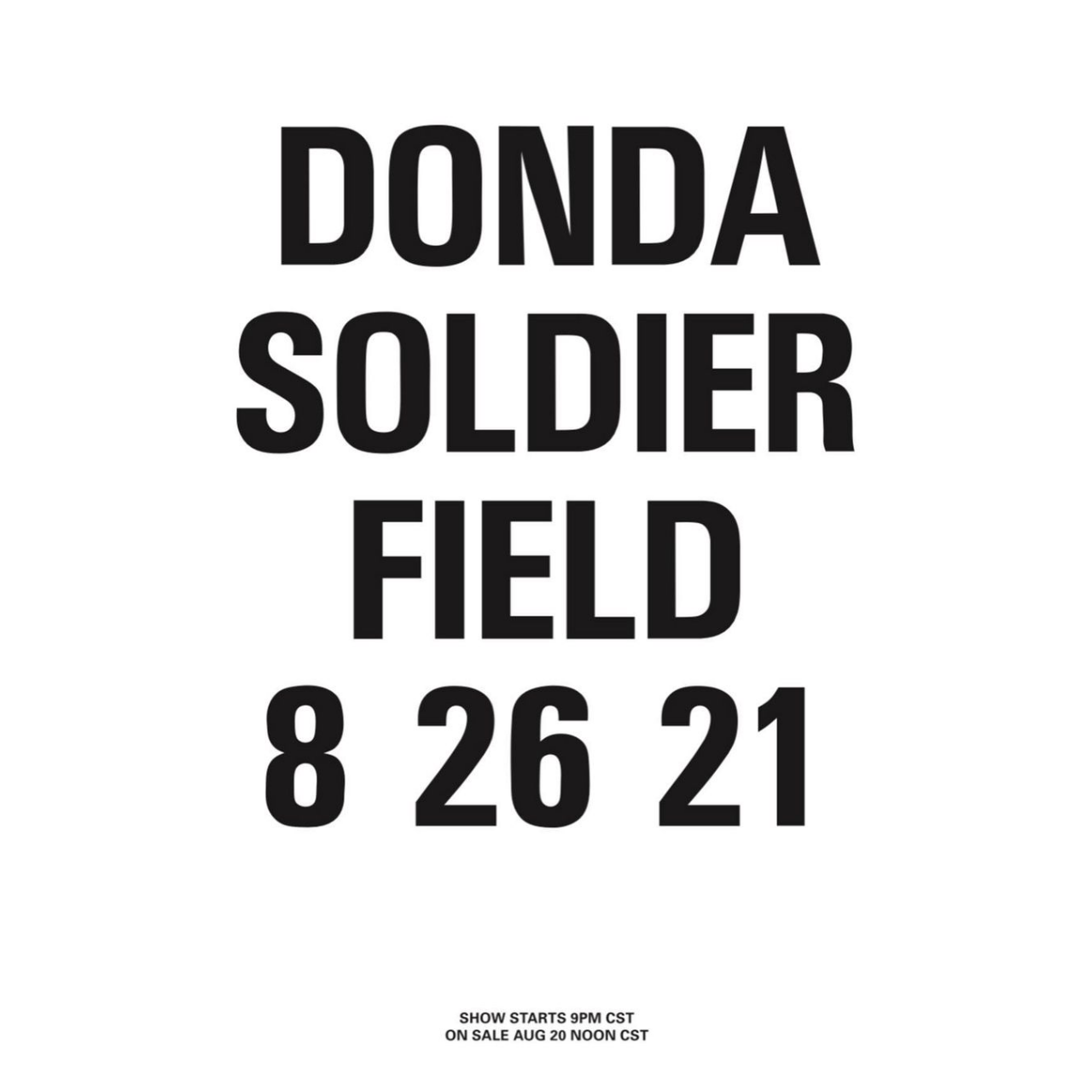
Invites to "A Donda Listening Event" (left), "The Donda Album Release" (middle), and "The Donda Album Experience" (right). The first two were held at Mercedes-Benz Stadium in Atlanta, while the latter was held at Soldier Field in Chicago.

To promote Donda prior to its release, West held a series of listening events. During the album's events, guest appearances from various artists were revealed, including Lil Baby, Playboi Carti, Pusha T, Jay-Z, Lil Yachty, Vory, KayCyy, Westside Gunn, Conway the Machine, Jay Electronica, Pop Smoke, the Sunday Service Choir, DaBaby, Marilyn Manson, and the Weeknd. West had updated Donda after each listening event like he did with his seventh studio album The Life of Pablo (2016), changing content such as the features on songs. Speaking with Apple Music's Zane Lowe, Dean depicted the process as "interesting" and "gruelling", remembering "lots of hours" and changes, from which the album "came out great". He elaborated by explaining that "each listening party was like a test" of sorts, with West succeeding each one by taking all "the information he got from everyone, including online reviews [and] personal friends' reviews", then "digest[ing] it all" in a manner to "adjust" Donda "the way" he wanted.

West held a private listening event for the album at ChurchLV in Las Vegas on July 18, 2021, which required registration and was invite-only. It started at 6:30 p.m. and finished at 8 p.m. Clips of the event surfaced online showing West hunched over his laptop, wearing gloves and a ski mask over his head. West played the music from his MacBook throughout, not speaking whatsoever. Following the listening event, Revolt host Justin LaBoy posted a photo of himself with West and referred to Donda as album of the year.

On July 19, 2021, it was announced that West would hold a public listening event for Donda, titled "Kanye West Presents: A Donda Listening Event", at Mercedes-Benz Stadium on July 22, 2021. It was set to start at 8 p.m. on the date, though the livestream began nearly two hours behind schedule on Apple Music. West was completely silent throughout and paced the length of the stage at points, where he was unaccompanied. The listening event sold out Mercedes-Benz Stadium's 2021 capacity of 42,000, alongside setting a record for the biggest Apple Music livestream worldwide, with over 3.3 million viewers.

Live Nation Entertainment confirmed at the end of July 2021 that the album's second listening event in Mercedes-Benz Stadium, titled "Kanye West Presents: The Donda Album Release", was set to take place on August 5. It was scheduled to start at 9 p.m. on the date. An Apple Music livestream commenced from West's room inside the stadium on the morning of August 5, 2021, leading up to the event, which later began at 9:30 p.m. The event was a grander presentation than its predecessor and on the circular stage, West's room was re-created. West was positioned in the center throughout, wearing an all-black outfit and a mask. The event ended with him being elevated to the ceiling of Mercedes-Benz Stadium by harness, in a manner reminiscent of ascending to heaven. The listening party had over 40,000 attendees. It surpassed West's own record for the most popular livestream on Apple Music, drawing in 5.4 million viewers. Following the event, Kid Cudi was reported to be featured on "Moon" and "Remote Control" alongside Don Toliver and Young Thug, respectively, though he was only included on the final version of the former on Donda. However, the deluxe edition of the album included "Remote Control pt. 2" which contained Kid Cudi's verse.

On August 18, 2021, West announced a third listening event for the album entitled "Kanye West Presents: The Donda Album Experience", which was scheduled to be hosted at Soldier Field in Chicago on August 26; the stadium's Twitter account simultaneously gave confirmation. The event was slated to begin at 9 p.m. On August 24, 2021, Chopper 7HD flew over Soldier Field, capturing the construction of a replica of West's childhood home at the stadium's center. The event was livestreamed on Apple Music and started nearly two hours behind schedule, beginning at 10:49 p.m. Kanye West appeared by coming out from the replica home while wearing an all-black outfit, accompanied by footage and photo collages of Donda. West was joined on the porch of the home by Marilyn Manson and DaBaby. For the event's conclusion, West came out of the replica home wearing a stunt suit after having been set on fire inside earlier and was quickly extinguished, unmasking himself to reunite with Kardashian.

Soldier Field was limited from its standard capacity of 63,000 due to COVID-19 restrictions, with the listening event having an attendance of around 38,000. On August 31, 2021, it was reported by the Chicago Sun-Times that the replica was used because Chicago's Buildings Department did not allow West to move his home from the street address, as originally intended. The department explained how moving a home in the city "is a very technical process that requires structural engineer reports and multiple city permits", revealing the denial of West's request was due to "no permit application ha[ving] been received to excavate and move the vacant property" while it was also in Demolition Court.

== Critical reception ==
Professional ratings
Aggregate scores
Source	Rating
AnyDecentMusic?	5.4/10
Metacritic	53/100
Review scores
Source	Rating
AllMusic	3/5 stars
The A.V. Club	C−
The Daily Telegraph	3/5 stars
Exclaim!	7/10
The Guardian	2/5 stars
NME	3/5 stars
Pitchfork	6.0/10
PopMatters	5/10
Rolling Stone	2/5 stars
Slant Magazine	4/5 stars

Donda received mixed reception from music critics. According to the review aggregator Metacritic, Donda received "mixed or average reviews" based on a weighted average score of 53 out of 100 from 19 critic scores. Aggregator AnyDecentMusic? gave it a 5.4 out of 10, based on their assessment of the critical consensus.

Charles Lyons-Burt of Slant Magazine felt impressed with Donda, believing it to feature West at "arguably the most vulnerable and broken that [he] has allowed himself to appear on record". Lyons-Burt also praised the themes and production, and concluded by labeling the album West's "most unforgiving self-portrait yet". Chris Willman from Variety saw its music as "close to unassailable" and praised the pacing, besides "those last four completely superfluous remixes", while he preferred the structure of the gospel elements to those on Jesus Is King. For Consequence, Marchus Shorter hailed Donda as the rapper's best album since Yeezus, describing it as "ambitious, raw, indulgent, and, after several revisions, a cohesive vision". Riley Wallace of Exclaim! regarded the album as "[West's] best body of work in recent memory" and appreciated the narrative behind it, though was mixed about the features and criticized the length. Rhian Daly of NME felt assured the album "isn't a rushed job", although believed it could have been improved by West wasting less time and "learning when to let things go", finding there to be a large amount of filler alongside "enough gems" to make the album worthwhile.

Wood asserted that Donda registers more as a way "of maintaining Kanye's powerful social standing" than "an organized aesthetic experience", characterizing it as feeling "slapdash" due to the disorganized themes. He went on to praise how the album takes from West's various eras of the past, such as Yeezus, Jesus Is King, My Beautiful Dark Twisted Fantasy, and 808s & Heartbreak. Paul Thompson of Rolling Stone saw that the album is "more considered and musically coherent" than any of West's projects over the preceding five years, though considered it to be uneven and too long, with a "radically superior second half". Kornhaber gave the album a negative review, writing that "supposed transcendence comes to feel suspiciously like regression" while surrender feels like "self-exculpation". He complained how the album "aches" for "a miracle to unfold" of similarity to the accompanying listening events and harshly asserted that it seems like "a career's worth of B-sides", despite crediting the highlights for being "pretty good".

=== Criticism of DaBaby and Marilyn Manson ===
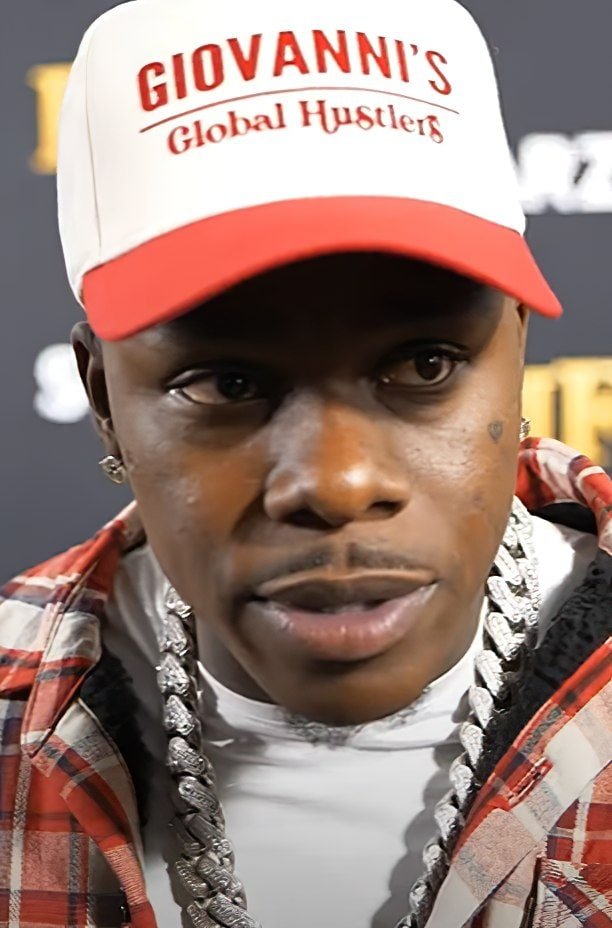
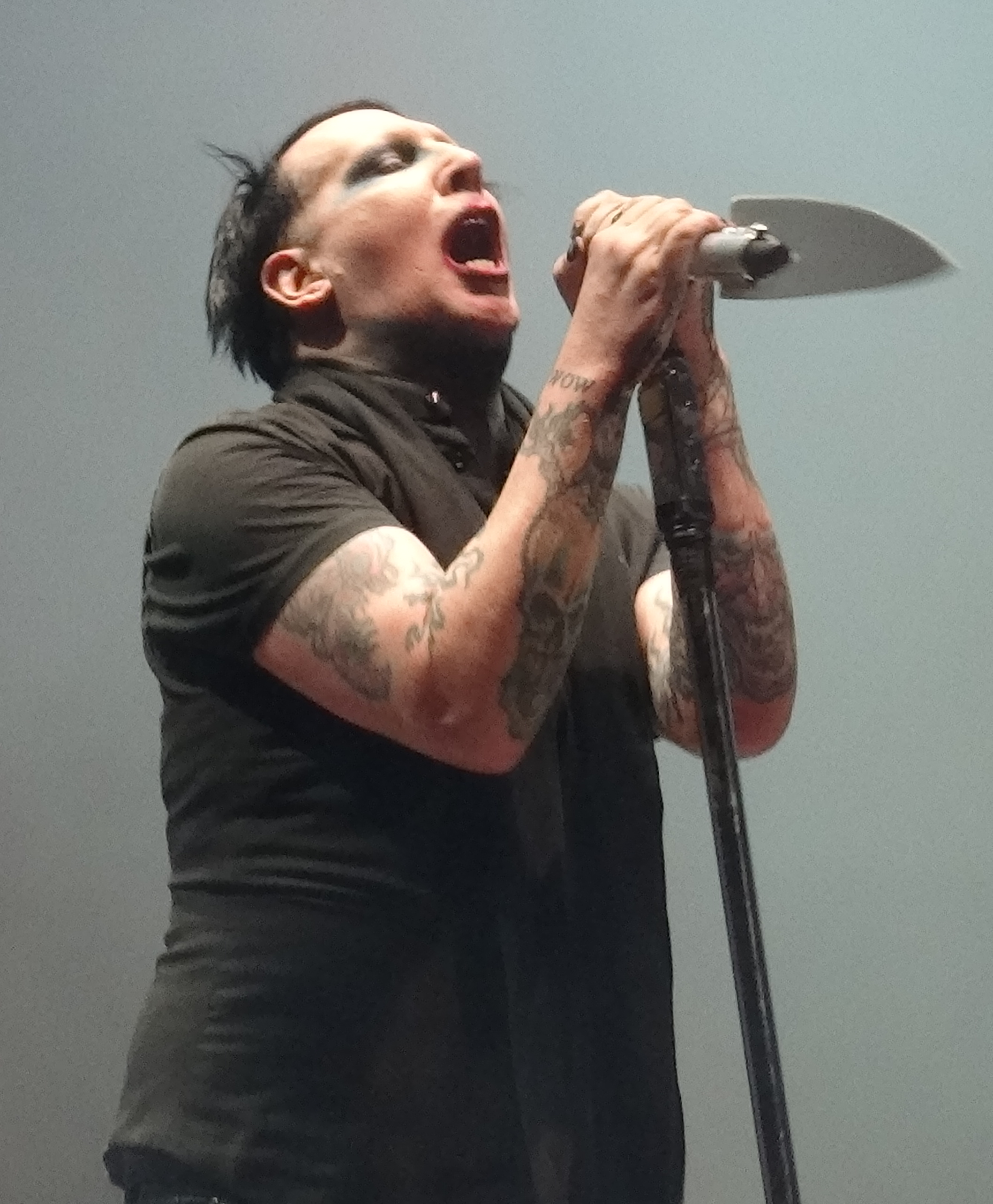
The inclusion of rapper DaBaby (left) and shock rock musician Marilyn Manson (right) as guest artists on Donda led to negative responses from critics.

The revelation of DaBaby and Marilyn Manson as guest artists during Donda's August 26 listening event was met with backlash from critics due to the respective allegations of homophobia and sexual abuse against them. According to Jem Aswad of Variety, "West was widely accused of trolling the public, among other things, after [the] event." Some suggested that West envisioned DaBaby and Manson's inclusion as a comment on cancel culture. An unspecified source told People that West "knows that having controversial figures around will be provocative and will get people to [sic] talking." The source continued: "He knows that people are going to be upset and that there will be backlash. He also knows that people are talking about it today when they wouldn't have been otherwise." West defended their presence; he cited DaBaby's support for his 2020 presidential campaign and argued that the allegations against Manson should not restrict him from recording music.

Marilyn Manson's former partner Evan Rachel Wood, who accused him of sexual assault, posted an apparent response to his inclusion on Donda a few hours after its release; she shared a video of her covering New Radicals' "You Get What You Give" on Instagram, quoting its title and encouraging rape survivors "who got slapped in the face" to not give up. Aaron Loose of Christianity Today criticized West's decision to work with Marilyn Manson and Chris Brown as "an unforgivable insult to marginalised rap fans", and Roisin O'Connor of The Independent found the inclusion of "two of music's most despised figures" inexcusable. She condemned Universal Music for approving Donda's release, writing that Manson's appearance "speaks volumes of society's apathy towards rape survivors".

=== Accolades ===
On Complex's list of the best albums of 2021, Donda was placed sixth. Similarly, Time ranked the album at number seven on their list for the year. On Caramanica's list of the best albums of 2021, the deluxe edition was placed at number 10. Caramanica said it "lives at the intersection" of West's Yeezus and Jesus eras, commenting that the "scabrous, churning production that sets a chaotic mood" is accompanied by "moments of intense searching, gasps for air amid the unrest". Associated Press listed Donda as among the top 10 albums of the year. Billboard placed it at number 39 on their "The 50 Best Albums of 2021: Staff List", with Heran Mamo declaring that West confronts his inner demons and "yearns for mercy without two key women" in his mother and Kardashian.

Donda was nominated for Album of the Year at the 2022 Grammy Awards, standing as one of the last two albums to be selected in the category. In the same ceremony, the album was nominated in the category of Best Rap Album. "Jail" and "Hurricane" won the awards of Best Rap Song and Best Melodic Rap Performance, respectively, at the 2022 Grammys.

== Commercial performance ==
Donda debuted at number one on the US Billboard 200 after a five-day period of tracking, with 309,000 album-equivalent units that consisted of 272,000 streaming-equivalent album units, 37,000 pure album sales, and less than 1,000 track-equivalent units. The album-equivalent units set a record for the highest amount of 2021, exceeding the 295,000 units amassed by Olivia Rodrigo's Sour. Kanye West scored his 10th chart-topper on the Billboard 200 with the album, making him one of seven artists to have gathered this amount of number-ones on the chart. It also marked West's 10th consecutive album to debut at the summit, tying him with Eminem's record. It also reached the summit of the US Top Christian Albums and Top Gospel Albums charts, becoming West's second album to top the two charts and achieving the biggest unit week for both. The album entered atop the US Top R&B/Hip-Hop Albums chart, on which it was the rapper's 10th chart-topper. 23 of Donda's tracks debuted on the Billboard Hot 100, leading to West joining Drake as one of the two artists to have 23 or more songs chart simultaneously. This also increased West's Hot 100 entries to 133, the fifth most of any act, a ranking he attained for top-40 hits as well by having scored 68. "Hurricane" was the highest charting track, reaching number six and becoming West's 19th top-20 hit. The 23 tracks took up the top-23 spots on both the US Christian Songs and Gospel Songs charts, exceeding West's record of all top-10 positions on the former chart and the top-11 on the latter. As a result of the album and its tracks, West went up from number 67 to the top position on the Billboard Artist 100, giving him his third week atop the chart. It was the ninth best-selling digital album of 2021 in the United States. On March 9, 2022, Donda was certified platinum by the RIAA for pushing 1,000,000 certified units in the US.

In Canada, Donda topped the Canadian Albums Chart, and on January 7, 2022, it was certified platinum by Music Canada (MC) for shelving 80,000 album-equivalent units in the country. Elsewhere, the album entered atop the ARIA Albums chart in Australia, standing as West's fourth number-one release on the chart. This led to him joining 5 Seconds of Summer, Justin Bieber, Keith Urban, Kings of Leon, and Lady Gaga as one of the acts to achieve their fourth number-one album in the 2020s decade. The debut increased West's number of chart-topping weeks to five, alongside giving the rapper his ninth top-10 release on the ARIA Albums chart. 19 of Donda's tracks debuted within the top-50 of the ARIA Singles chart; "Hurricane" charted the highest at number four. The entries surpassed Taylor Swift's milestone of 16 debuts in the top-50, as well as the record held by both Post Malone and Michael Jackson for 17 tracks present within this ranking. The album also topped the New Zealand Albums chart, and by April 2, 2026, it had been certified double platinum by the Recorded Music NZ (RMNZ) for shipments of 30,000 units in New Zealand.

Donda ranked at number one on the midweek album sales chart in the United Kingdom, before debuting at the same position on the UK Albums Chart. It gave West his third chart-topper in the UK and stood as his first since Yeezus in 2013. The album pushed 19,617 chart sales, 91 percent of which came from 17,921 streaming-equivalent units, while the other nine percent consisted of 1,696 paid downloads. In total, Donda accumulated 33.4 million streams in the UK across its 27 tracks. Three of the tracks debuted on the UK Singles Chart, with "Hurricane" attaining the highest position of number seven. The album entered atop the Irish Albums Chart, standing as West's second number-one album in Ireland and his ninth to reach the top-10. West had the three highest new entries on the Irish Singles Chart with the tracks that debuted; "Hurricane" was the most successful, reaching number seven. Donda opened at the summit of the French Albums chart, becoming West's first number-one album in France and selling 9,476 copies over a five-day tracking period. The album also topped the charts in Austria, Belgium's Flanders and Wallonia regions, the Czech Republic, Denmark, Finland, Iceland, Italy, Lithuania, the Netherlands, Norway, and Sweden. On May 3, 2022, it was awarded a platinum certiifcation by IFPI Danmark for shipments of 20,000 units in Denmark. Donda peaked within the top five in Germany, Slovakia, Spain, and Switzerland.

== Track listing ==
Donda track listing
No.	Title	Writer(s)	Producer(s)	Length
1.	"Donda Chant"	Kanye West; Syleena Johnson; Malik Yusef	West	0:52
2.	"Jail"	West; Shawn Carter; Charles Njapa; Michael Dean; Mark Williams; Raul Cubina; Dwayne Abernathy Jr.; Sean Solymar; Yusef; John Moylett; Warryn Campbell	West; 88-Keys; Mike Dean; Ojivolta; Dem Jointz^{[a]}; E.Vax^{[a]}; Solymar^{[b]}	4:57
3.	"God Breathed"	West; Tavoris Hollins Jr.; Evan Mast; M. Williams; Cubina; Aaron Butts; Federico Vindver; Brian Miller; Richard McGuire; Yusuf; Dennis Young; Salvatore Principato; Scott Hartley	West; E.Vax; Ojivolta; Arrow; Vindver^{[a]}; Allday^{[a]}	5:33
4.	"Off the Grid"	West; Jordan Carter; Maxie Ryles III; Samuel Gloade; Asif Aswad; M. Williams; Cubina; Billy Walsh; David Ruoff; Elias Klughammer; Eric Sloan; Cydel Young; Yusef; Orlando Wilder; Tobias Smith	West; 30 Roc; Ojivolta; AyoAA; David & Eli^{[a]}; Sloane^{[b]}	5:39
5.	"Hurricane" (with the Weeknd featuring Lil Baby)	West; Abel Tesfaye; Dominique Jones; M. Dean; Jahmal Gwin; Khalil Abdul-Rahman; Ronald Spence Jr.; Henry Walter; M. Williams; Cubina; Njapa; Christopher Ruelas; Mark Mbogo; Nasir Pemberton; Sam Barsh; Josh Mease; C. Young; Yusef; Wilder; Albert Daniels; Cailin Russo; Daniel Seeff; Dexter Mills; T. Smith	West; M. Dean; BoogzDaBeast; DJ Khalil; Ronny J; Cirkut^{[a]}; Ojivolta^{[a]}; 88-Keys^{[b]}; Nascent^{[b]}	4:03
6.	"Praise God"	West; Jacques Webster II; Hykeem Carter Jr.; Gloade; M. Williams; Cubina; M. Dean; Anthony Khan; Aqeel Tate; E. Sloan; Mbogo; Yusef; Che Smith; Kazuhiko Kato; Machiko Ryu	West; 30 Roc; Ojivolta; M. Dean^{[a]}; the Twilite Tone^{[a]}; Zen Taichi^{[a]}; Sloane^{[b]}	3:47
7.	"Jonah"	West; Hollins; Durk Banks; Leonard Harris; Yusef; Tahrence Brown; Michael Suski; M. Dean; Wesley Glass; Mills; Wilder	West; Audi; DrtWrk; M. Dean^{[b]}; Wheezy^{[b]}	3:15
8.	"Ok Ok"	West; Miles McCollum; Denzel Charles; Matthew Samuels; Louis Bell; Terrence Thornton; Ryles; C. Young; Yusef; Walsh; Wilder; T. Smith; Rennard East	West; Boi-1da; Bell^{[a]}	3:25
9.	"Junya"	West; J. Carter; Pemberton; M. Williams; Cubina; Roark Bailey; Walsh; C. Young; Yusef; Thornton; Warren Trotter; Mills; East	West; Digital Nas; Ojivolta; Bailey^{[b]}	2:28
10.	"Believe What I Say"	West; Abernathy; Gwin; Michael Mule; Isaac De Boni; M. Williams; Cubina; Anthony Reid; C. Young; Yusef; Lauryn Hill; Mark Myrie; Walsh; Adam Wright; Cristina Gallo	West; Dem Jointz; BoogzDaBeast^{[a]}; FnZ^{[a]}; Ojivolta^{[a]}; Antman Wonder^{[b]}	4:02
11.	"24"	West; M. Williams; Cubina; Mills; Mbogo; Yusef; Daniels; Miller	West; Ojivolta; Allday; Cory Henry^{[a]}; Warryn Campbell^{[a]}	3:18
12.	"Remote Control"	West; Jeffery Williams; Tim Gomringer; Kevin Gomringer; Pemberton; M. Williams; Cubina; Njapa; M. Dean; Travis Walton; C. Young; Yusef	West; Cubeatz; Digital Nas; Ojivolta; 88-Keys^{[a]}; M. Dean^{[a]}; Teddy Walton^{[b]}	3:19
13.	"Moon"	West; Caleb Toliver; Scott Mescudi; Mast; Rahman; Gwin; Yusef	West; E.Vax; DJ Khalil^{[a]}; BoogzDaBeast^{[a]}	2:36
14.	"Heaven and Hell"	West; Njapa; Gwin; M. Williams; Cubina; Edgar Panford; Nima Jahanbin; Paimon Jahanbin; Andrew Dawson; C. Young; Yusef; Walsh; Wilder; T. Smith; Michael Oliver	West; 88-Keys; BoogzDaBeast; Ojivolta^{[a]}; Nabeyin^{[a]}; Wallis Lane^{[a]}; Dawson^{[b]}	2:25
15.	"Donda"	West; Mule; De Boni; M. Williams; Cubina; Gwin; Yusef; Catherine Bollinger; John Trainum	West; FnZ; Ojivolta; BoogzDaBeast	2:08
16.	"Keep My Spirit Alive"	West; Alvin Worthy; Demond Price; Mbogo; Yusef; Lawrence Parker; Mule; De Boni; M. Williams; Cubina; Abernathy; Gwin; Darius Woodley; Rico Nichols	West; FnZ; Ojivolta; Dem Jointz; BoogzDaBeast; Woodley; Nichols	3:41
17.	"Jesus Lord"	West; Elpadaro Allah; Kasseem Dean; Mike Lévy; Yusef; Wilder; M. Dean; Larry Hoover Jr.	West; Swizz Beatz; Gesaffelstein^{[a]}; M. Dean^{[a]}	8:59
18.	"New Again"	West; Gwin; Abernathy; M. Williams; Cubina; N. Jahanbin; P. Jahanbin; Jacqueline Cummings; Njapa; Yusef; Laraya Robinson; Magnus Lidehäll; Salem Al Fakir	West; BoogzDaBeast; Dem Jointz^{[a]}; Ojivolta^{[a]}; Wallis Lane^{[a]}; Mia Wallis^{[a]}; 88-Keys^{[b]}	3:03
19.	"Tell the Vision"	West; Bashar Jackson; Gwin; Mule; De Boni; M. Williams; Cubina; Yusef; Thornton; Angie Martinez; Jalil Peraza; Luke Doyley; Ricardo Lamarre; Samuel Jackson; Thomas Whitfield	West; BoogzDaBeast; FnZ^{[a]}; Ojivolta^{[a]}	1:44
20.	"Lord I Need You"	West; Gwin; Mast; Mule; De Boni; Glass; M. Williams; Cubina; Lee Stashenko; Carlos St. John Phillips; Anthony Williams II; Garcia; Alexander	West; BoogzDaBeast; E.Vax^{[a]}; FnZ^{[a]}; Wheezy^{[a]}; Ojivolta^{[b]}; Fallen^{[b]}	2:42
21.	"Pure Souls"	West; Rodrick Moore Jr.; Chinsea Lee; Gwin; M. Dean; M. Williams; Cubina; Wilder; Christoph Bauss; Tim Friedrich; Bastian Völkel; C. Young; Yusef; Tyshane Thompson; Raphael Saadiq; Simon Plummer; Donny Flores; Trotter; Mills; Harris	West; BoogzDaBeast; M. Dean^{[a]}; Ojivolta^{[a]}; Fya Man^{[a]}; Shuko^{[a]}; Sucuki^{[a]}; Völkel^{[b]}	5:59
22.	"Come to Life"	West; Jeff Bhasker; Walsh; M. Williams; Cubina; Campbell; M. Dean; Yusef	West; Bhasker; Walsh; Ojivolta; Campbell; M. Dean^{[a]}	5:10
23.	"No Child Left Behind"	West; Hollins; Lévy; Gwin; Douglas Brown; Yusef; Frankie Smith; Jahshua Brown	West; Gesaffelstein; BoogzDaBeast; Cashmere Brown^{[b]}	2:58
24.	"Jail pt 2"	West; Jonathan Kirk; Brian Warner; Njapa; M. Dean; M. Williams; Cubina; Abernathy; Solymar; Yusef; Moylett; Campbell	West; 88-Keys; M. Dean; Ojivolta; Dem Jointz^{[a]}; E.Vax^{[a]}; Solymar^{[b]}	4:57
25.	"Ok Ok pt 2"	West; Lee; Charles; Samuels; Louis Bell; Thornton; Ryles; C. Young; Yusef; Walsh; Wilder; T. Smith; East	West; Boi-1da; Bell^{[a]}	3:25
26.	"Junya pt 2"	West; J. Carter; Tyrone Griffin Jr.; Pemberton; M. Williams; Cubina; Bailey; Walsh; C. Young; Yusef; Thornton; Trotter; Mills; East	West; Digital Nas; Ojivolta; Bailey^{[b]}	3:03
27.	"Jesus Lord pt 2"	West; Allah; Sean Jacobs; Jason Phillips; David Styles; K. Dean; Lévy; Yusef; Wilder; M. Dean; Hoover	West; Swizz Beatz; Gesaffelstein^{[a]}; M. Dean^{[a]}	11:31
Total length:				108:49

Deluxe edition - Disc 1 (Note: The deluxe edition massively alters the original track listing, and the specific configurations will not be listed here.)
No.	Title	Writer(s)	Producer(s)	Length
4.	"Life of the Party" (with André 3000)	West; André Benjamin; Terrence Thornton; Yusuf; East; Miller; Gwin; Khan; Vindver; M. Williams; Cubina; Abernathy; Derek Watkins; Norma Toney; Jack Hansen; Bruce Kirkman; Paul Anastasio	West; All Day; BoogzDaBeast^{[a]}; the Twilite Tone^{[a]}; Vindver^{[b]}; Ojivolta^{[b]}; Dem Jointz^{[b]}; Fonzworth Bentley^{[b]}	6:31
11.	"Up from the Ashes"	West; Nikisha Grier; T. Thornton; Gene Thornton; East; Matthew Leon; Alex Ernewein; Timothy Mosley; Vindver; Angel Lopez	West; Sean Leon; Alex Ernewein; Timbaland^{[a]}; Vindver^{[a]}; Angel Lopez^{[a]}	2:42
12.	"Remote Control pt 2"	West; J. Williams; Mescudi; T. Gomringer; K. Gomringer; Pemberton; M. Williams; Cubina; Njapa; M. Dean; Walton; C. Young; Yusef	West; Cubeatz; Digital Nas; Ojivolta; 88-Keys^{[a]}; M. Dean^{[a]}; Teddy Walton^{[b]}	5:23
17.	"Never Abandon Your Family"	West; Bell; Yusef; Walsh; Daniels; M. Williams; Cubina; Mast	West; Ojivolta; E.vax	3:27

Deluxe edition - Disc 2
No.	Title	Writer(s)	Producer(s)	Length
14.	"Keep My Spirit Alive pt 2"	West; Mbogo; Worthy; Price; Yusef; Parker; Mule; De Boni; M. Williams; Cubina; Abernathy; Gwin; Woodley; Nichols	West; FnZ; Ojivolta; Dem Jointz; BoogzDaBeast; Woodley; Nichols	3:41
Total length:				130:52

- ^{^[a]} signifies a co-producer
- ^{^[b]} signifies an additional producer

=== Notes ===
- "Jail" features vocals from Jay-Z
- "God Breathed" features vocals from Vory
- "Off the Grid" features vocals from Playboi Carti and Fivio Foreign
- "Praise God" features vocals by Travis Scott and Baby Keem
- "Jonah" features vocals from Vory and Lil Durk
- "Ok Ok" features vocals from Lil Yachty and Rooga
- "Junya" features vocals from Playboi Carti
- "Remote Control" features vocals from Young Thug
- "Moon" features vocals from Don Toliver and Kid Cudi
- "Donda" features vocals from the Wrldfms Tony Williams and Stalone
- "Keep My Spirit Alive" features vocals from Westside Gunn and Conway the Machine
- "Jesus Lord" features vocals from Jay Electronica
- "Tell the Vision" features vocals from Pop Smoke
- "Pure Souls" features vocals from Roddy Ricch and Shenseea
- The deluxe edition's version of "Come to Life" features vocals from Tyler, the Creator
- "No Child Left Behind" features vocals from Vory
- "Jail pt 2" features vocals from DaBaby and Marilyn Manson
- "Ok Ok pt 2" features vocals from Shenseea and Rooga
- "Junya pt 2" features vocals from Playboi Carti and Ty Dolla Sign
- "Jesus Lord pt 2" features vocals from Jay Electronica and the Lox
- "Remote Control pt 2" features vocals from Young Thug and Kid Cudi
- "Keep My Spirit Alive pt 2" features vocals from KayCyy, Westside Gunn, Conway the Machine, and additional vocals from Dem Jointz

==== Sample credits ====
- "God Breathed" contains a sample of "Bell Head", as performed by Liquid Liquid.
- "Believe What I Say" contains a sample of "Doo Wop (That Thing)", as written and performed by Lauryn Hill.
- Both versions of "Remote Control" contain an extract from the 2012 animated short film Strawinsky and the Mysterious House.
- "Heaven and Hell" contains a sample of "Heaven and Hell Is on Earth", as performed by 20th Century Steel Band.
- "Lord I Need You" contains a sample of "Make Me Over", written by Anthony Charles Williams II, as performed by Briana Babineaux.
- "Life of the Party" contains a sample of "I Was the Life of the Party", as performed by The Dramatics, uncredited excerpts from "Cannibal Cutie", as performed by Herb and the Spices, uncredited vocal samples of adlibs from rappers Diddy and the late Notorious B.I.G., and uncredited audio excerpts from a video recording of the late rapper DMX.
- "New Again" contains a sample of "As 1", written by Jacqueline Mapei Cummings, Magnus Lidehäll and Salem Al Fakir, as performed by Mapei.
- "Donda" contains a sample of "Candy", written by Kate Bollinger and John Trainum, as performed by Kate Bollinger.

== Personnel ==
=== Musicians ===
- Syleena Johnson – additional vocals (1)
- Dem Jointz – additional vocals (2, 10, 16, 24)
- Sunday Service Choir – additional vocals (2, 5, 11, 15, 18, 20, 27)
- Justin Austin – additional vocals (3)
- KayCyy – additional vocals (5, 11)
- Donda West – additional vocals (6, 15)
- Fivio Foreign – additional vocals (8, 25)
- Buju Banton – additional vocals (10)
- Stalone – additional vocals (10, 15)
- MUSYCA Children's Choir – additional vocals (15)
- The World Famous Tony Williams – additional vocals (15)
- Larry Hoover Jr. – additional vocals (17, 27)
- Briana Babineaux – additional vocals (20)
- Sam Barsh – keyboards (5)
- John Mease – keyboards (5)
- Daniel Seeff – bass (5)
- Cory Henry – organ (11)
- Brandee Younger – harp (12)
- Darius Woodley – drums (16)
- Rico Nichols – drums (16)
- Mark Williams – piano (22)
- Nikki Grier – choir arrangement (2, 5, 11, 18, 20, 24)
- Jason White – choir arrangement (2, 5, 11, 18, 20, 24)

=== Technical ===
- Maurizio "Irko" Sera – mix engineering, master engineering (all tracks)
- Mike Dean – mix engineering (1–7, 9, 11–16, 18, 20–21, 23–24, 26)
- Alejandro Rodriguez-Dawsøn – record engineering (1–9, 11–18, 20–22, 24–27)
- Enzo Rarri – record engineering (1, 3, 23, 27)
- Will Chason – record engineering (1, 4, 6–9, 15, 20, 23, 25–26), assistant record engineering (12–13)
- Ronald Lark III – record engineering (2)
- Gimel Keaton – record engineering (2, 24)
- Josh Berg – record engineering (2–27)
- Mikalai Skrobat – record engineering (2–18, 20–22, 24–27)
- Roark Bailey – record engineering (3–9, 12–13, 21, 26)
- Dem Jointz – record engineering (10, 15)
- Drrique Rendeer – record engineering (4, 13, 17, 27)
- James Kelso – record engineering (4, 13, 17, 27)
- Jonathan Pfarr – record engineering (12, 15, 20, 24)
- Randy Urbanski – record engineering (3, 20)
- Lorenzo Wolff – record engineering (4)
- Shin Kamiyama – record engineering (5)
- Zack Djurich – record engineering (5)
- Jesse Ray Ernster – record engineering (5)
- Devon Wilson – record engineering (5, 6, 10), mix assistance (6)
- Wilson "Zaigo" Mejia – record engineering (7)
- Gentuar Memishi – record engineering (8)
- Henry Russell Walter – record engineering (14, 22), vocal editing (9, 26), vocal production (12)
- Preston Reid – record engineering (10)
- Angad Bains – record engineering (12)
- Federico Vindver – record engineering (15), vocal production (15)
- Nagaris Johnson – record engineering (15)
- Todd Bergman – record engineering (15, 20)
- Kalam Ali Muttalib – record engineering (16)
- Sharif Shannon – mix assistance (4, 6)
- Rashade Benani Bevel – record engineering (16)
- Jess Jackson – record engineering (19)
- Scott McDowell – record engineering (23)
- Rafael Fai Baautista – record engineering (26), mix assistance (26)
- Louis Bell – vocal editing (2–8, 10–12, 14, 16–18, 20–22, 24–25, 27)
- Patrick Hundley – vocal editing (3–5, 9–11, 13–14, 16, 21, 24, 26–27)
- Stef Moro – mix assistance (3, 22)

== Charts ==
=== Weekly charts ===
Chart performance for Donda
Chart (2021–2022)	Peak position
Australian Albums (ARIA)	1
Australian Urban Albums (ARIA)	1
Austrian Albums (Ö3 Austria)	1
Belgian Albums (Ultratop Flanders)	1
Belgian Albums (Ultratop Wallonia)	1
Canadian Albums (Billboard)	1
Croatian International Albums (HDU)	20
Czech Albums (ČNS IFPI)	1
Danish Albums (Hitlisten)	1
Dutch Albums (Album Top 100)	1
Finnish Albums (Suomen virallinen lista)	1
French Albums (SNEP)	1
German Albums (Offizielle Top 100)	4
Icelandic Albums (Tónlistinn)	1
Irish Albums (Official Charts)	1
Italian Albums (FIMI)	1
Japan Hot Albums (Billboard Japan)	21
Japanese Albums (Oricon)	38
Lithuanian Albums (AGATA)	1
New Zealand Albums (RMNZ)	1
Norwegian Albums (VG-lista)	1
Polish Albums (ZPAV)	26
Portuguese Albums (AFP)	28
Scottish Albums (Official Charts)	23
Slovak Albums (ČNS IFPI)	2
Spanish Albums (Promusicae)	5
Swedish Albums (Sverigetopplistan)	1
Swiss Albums (Schweizer Hitparade)	2
Swiss Hip-Hop Albums (Schweizer Hitparade)	1
UK Albums (Official Charts)	1
UK Christian & Gospel Albums (Official Charts)	1
UK R&B Albums (Official Charts)	1
US Billboard 200	1
US Top Christian Albums (Billboard)	1
US Top Gospel Albums (Billboard)	1
US Top R&B/Hip-Hop Albums (Billboard)	1

=== Year-end charts ===
Year-end chart performance
Chart (2021)	Position
Australian Albums (ARIA)	36
Austrian Albums (Ö3 Austria)	63
Belgian Albums (Ultratop Flanders)	58
Belgian Albums (Ultratop Wallonia)	176
Canadian Albums (Billboard)	28
Danish Albums (Hitlisten)	14
Dutch Albums (Album Top 100)	46
French Albums (SNEP)	188
Icelandic Albums (Tónlistinn)	15
Irish Albums (IRMA)	46
New Zealand Albums (RMNZ)	28
Norwegian Albums (VG-lista)	10
Swiss Albums (Schweizer Hitparade)	34
UK Albums (OCC)	94
US Billboard 200	39
US Top Christian Albums (Billboard)	1
US Top Gospel Albums (Billboard)	1
US Top R&B/Hip-Hop Albums (Billboard)	19

Year-end chart performance
Chart (2022)	Position
Australian Albums (ARIA)	94
Belgian Albums (Ultratop Flanders)	142
Danish Albums (Hitlisten)	82
Icelandic Albums (Tónlistinn)	90
New Zealand Albums (RMNZ)	41
US Billboard 200	43
US Top Christian Albums (Billboard)	1
US Top Gospel Albums (Billboard)	1
US Top R&B/Hip-Hop Albums (Billboard)	33

Year-end chart performance
Chart (2023)	Position
US Top Christian Albums (Billboard)	1
US Top Gospel Albums (Billboard)	1

Year-end chart performance
Chart (2024)	Position
US Top Christian Albums (Billboard)	2
US Top Gospel Albums (Billboard)	1

Year-end chart performance
Chart (2025)	Position
US Top Christian Albums (Billboard)	7
US Top Gospel Albums (Billboard)	1

== Certifications ==
Certifications and sales
Region	Certification	Certified units/sales
Canada (Music Canada)	Platinum	80,000^{‡}
Denmark (IFPI Danmark)	Platinum	20,000^{‡}
France (SNEP)	Gold	50,000^{‡}
Italy (FIMI)	Gold	25,000^{‡}
New Zealand (RMNZ)	2× Platinum	30,000^{‡}
Poland (ZPAV)	Platinum	20,000^{‡}
United Kingdom (BPI)	Gold	100,000^{‡}
United States (RIAA)	Platinum	1,000,000^{‡}
^{‡} Sales+streaming figures based on certification alone.

== See also ==
- 2021 in hip-hop
- List of Billboard 200 number-one albums of 2021
