= Come to Life (song) =

2021 song by Kanye West

Song by Kanye West

from the album Donda
- Released: August 29, 2021
- Recorded: June 16, 2021 – August 2021
- Genre: Gospel
- Length: 5:10
- Label: GOOD; Def Jam
- Songwriters: Kanye West; Jeff Bhasker; Warryn Campbell; Mark Williams; Raul Cubina
- Producers: Kanye West; Jeff Bhasker; Ojivolta; Warryn Campbell; Mike Dean

Music video
- "Come to Life" on YouTube

"Come to Life" is a song by American rapper Kanye West from his tenth studio album, Donda (2021). The song features overlapping pianos and guitar chords, as well as a sample of David Paul Moten's sermon. The lyrics allude to the emotional fallout from West's divorce, while showcasing themes of liberation and God. On the deluxe version, "Come to Life" features background vocals from American rapper Tyler, the Creator.

An accompanying music video was released on September 2, 2021. The video sees West being set on fire during the album's Soldier Field listening party, before he reunites with Kim Kardashian once he has been extinguished. In October 2021, West performed the song at a wedding reception in Venice.

== Composition and lyrics ==
"Come to Life" is a gospel song. The instrumental features cascading, overlapping pianos and guitar chords. A sample of David Paul Moten's sermon is heard at the beginning, with it being used throughout the song. Moten later claimed that West and his team did not seek permission to use the sample prior to the song's release. At the midpoint, a piano solo is introduced, which was originally reported to be played by sixth-grader Zen Micheline Hung despite the credits listing Mark Williams of Ojivolta as the performer.

Lyrically, "Come to Life" features themes of liberation and God, while alluding to the emotional fallout from West's divorce from Kim Kardashian. Rolling Stone's Paul Thompson writes, "it makes you want to send a concerned party to his mansion". West's vocals on the song are strained and high-pitched, with Rhian Daly from NME describing them as "full of regret and desperation".

The version of the song featured on the deluxe version of Donda includes backing vocals from fellow American rapper Tyler, the Creator.

== Release and promotion ==
On August 29, 2021, "Come to Life" was included as the 22nd track on Donda.

A music video for the song was released on September 2, 2021. The video features footage from the album's third public listening event at Soldier Field in Chicago on August 26, capturing West getting set on fire while sitting in a replica of his childhood home and wearing protective gear. The home is also set alight, accompanied by onlookers watching the scene. West then stands up and walks out, though remains covered in flames, before he is extinguished. The rapper's then-wife Kim Kardashian slowly approaches the center of the stadium as she wears a Balenciaga wedding dress, reuniting with him for the video's conclusion. Variety's Jem Aswad named West setting on fire and reuniting with Kardashian as "two of the more remarkable scenes" of the event, while Laura Harding of the Irish Independent depicted the rapper as being "engulfed" by fire. At Vulture, Bethy Squires compared West setting alight to the house in the film Badlands (1973) and the main character of the essays When You Are Engulfed in Flames (2008).

On October 16, 2021, West performed "Come to Life" as part of his four-song set at the wedding reception for Tiffany & Co. executive Alexandre Arnault and D'estree founder Geralde Guyot in Venice, Italy. During the performance, he wore a Halloween mask and a large suit jacket.

== Critical reception ==
"Come to Life" received acclaim from music critics. Writing for Variety, Chris Willman praised the song, believing "it might be the best thing he’s ever done — certainly it’s the most beautiful". Calling it the most focused song on Donda, he praised how West "utterly drops the pride" in his lyrics "to focus on depression and humility, accompanied by cascading, overlapping pianos and guitar chords straight off a pure pop album… a great one."

=== Accolades ===
Variety named "Come to Life" the 11th best song of 2021.

Select year-end rankings for "Come to Life"
Publication	List	Rank	Ref
Mic Cheque	Best Songs of 2021	21	
Variety	The 50 Best Songs of 2021	11	

== Credits and personnel ==
Credits adapted from Tidal.

- Jeff Bhasker – producer, composer, lyricist
- Kanye West – producer, composer, lyricist
- Mike Dean – producer, co-producer
- Ojivolta – producer
- Warryn Campbell – producer, composer, lyricist
- Mark Williams – composer, lyricist, associated performer, piano
- Raul Cubina – composer, lyricist
- Stef Moro – assistant mixer
- Irko – mastering engineer, mix engineer
- Alejandro Rodriguez-Dawsøn – recording engineer, studio personnel
- Cirkut – recording engineer, studio personnel
- Josh Berg – recording engineer, studio personnel
- Mikalai Skrobat – recording engineer, studio personnel
- Louis Bell – vocal editing

== Charts ==
=== Weekly charts ===
Chart performance for "Come to Life"
Chart (2021)	Peak position
Australia (ARIA)	60
Canada Hot 100 (Billboard)	60
Global 200 (Billboard)	65
Portugal (AFP)	126
South Africa (TOSAC)	36
UK Hip Hop/R&B (Official Charts)	26
US Billboard Hot 100	77
US Hot Christian Songs (Billboard)	20
US Gospel Songs (Billboard)	20

=== Year-end charts ===
2021 year-end chart performance for "Come to Life"
Chart (2021)	Position
US Christian Songs (Billboard)	69
US Gospel Songs (Billboard)	30
