= Life of the Party (Kanye West and André 3000 song) =

- The single's artwork; the same plain black square used for Donda (Deluxe) (Note: The color code of the artwork is not exactly black (#000000) but instead #020305)

Single by Kanye West and André 3000

from the album Donda (Deluxe)
- Released: November 14, 2021
- Recorded: April 6, 2019 – 2021
- Genre: Conscious hip hop
- Length: 6:32
- Label: GOOD; Def Jam
- Songwriters: Kanye West; André Benjamin; Anthony C. Khan; Brian Miller; Bruce Kirkman; Derek Watkins; Dwayne Abernathy Jr.; Federico Vindver; Jack Hansen; Jahmal Gwin; Malik Yusef; Mark Williams; Norma Jean Toney; Paul Anastasio; Raul Cubina; Rennard East; Terrence Thornton
- Producers: Kanye West; AllDay

Kanye West singles chronology
"Hurricane" (2021)	"Life of the Party" (2021)	"Believe What I Say" / "Off the Grid" (2021)

André 3000 singles chronology
"No Cigar" (2020)	"Life of the Party" (2021)

Music video
- "Life of the Party" on YouTube

Audio sample
- Kanye West and André 3000 - "Life of the Party": file; help

"Life of the Party" is a song by American rappers Kanye West and André 3000. The conscious hip-hop record was recorded from 2019 to 2021, and was produced by West and AllDay. It notably ends with an audio clip of fellow American rapper DMX and his daughter on an amusement park ride. It was intended for release on West's tenth studio album, Donda (2021), but was left off the album due to André 3000 not agreeing with his verse being edited to a clean version. The song was later leaked by Canadian rapper Drake on Sound 42 Radio, amidst a feud with West.

It was initially released as an exclusive to the Donda Stem Player in October 2021, but was later released to streaming services on November of the same year through the deluxe version of Donda. An accompanying single release of "Life of the Party" was released along with the deluxe, containing the uncensored version of André 3000's verse. Upon its release, "Life of the Party" received universal acclaim lauding the lyrical content of West’s and Andre 3000’s verse and the production. The single charted at number 13 on the US Billboard Bubbling Under Hot 100 chart, and peaked at number 3 on both the Hot Christian Songs and Gospel Songs charts. It also charted in Ireland, New Zealand, and South Africa. A music video was later released on May 8, 2022.

== Background and leak ==
On July 16, 2021, rapper Consequence posted a video to Instagram of West in the studio with Tyler, the Creator, with a snippet of "Life of the Party" being played. On July 18, the original version of the song recorded earlier that year (which did not include any vocals from André 3000) was previewed at a private listening event in Las Vegas. West played the song for German news outlet Bild in Berlin on September 2, stating that a video shoot was planned and that he wanted to release it soon.

In the lead up to Donda releasing, West had taken shots aimed at Drake, including posting his home address to his Instagram. On September 4, a day after Drake released his album Certified Lover Boy, Drake leaked "Life of the Party" on his Sound 42 radio show on Sirius XM amidst a feud with West. This version leaked by Drake seemed to have a different verse from West with disses aimed at Drake, as well as a guest verse from André 3000. André 3000 made a statement about the leak saying that West had reached out to him a few weeks prior to the song leaking to be part of Donda and was inspired to make a musical tribute to his mom.

"Life of the Party" was later omitted from the album due to West's stance on profanity at the time, with André 3000 disagreeing with his verse being edited to a clean version without the raw original available. Moreover, the version of the song that André 3000 wrote did not contain the disses aimed at Drake. André 3000 lamented that the song leaked with the diss verse, stating, "It's unfortunate that it was released in this way and two artists that I love are going back and forth".

== Release ==
A new version of the track, containing the original verse from West and a censored verse from André 3000, was released on the Donda Stem Player on October 27, 2021. The track was released along with two other previously unreleased tracks titled "Never Abandon Your Family" and "Up from the Ashes", as well as the original version of "Remote Control", containing a verse from Kid Cudi. The song was released as part of the deluxe version of Donda, and as a single for the explicit version on November 14, 2021. Andre 3000's verse was named best rap verse of the year by both Complex and HipHopDX.

== Commercial performance ==
In the United States of America, the single charted at number 13 on the Billboard Bubbling Under Hot 100 Singles chart and number 47 on the Hot R&B/Hip-Hop Songs chart, and peaked at number 3 on both the Hot Christian Songs and Gospel Songs charts. Worldwide, it charted at number 96 on the Irish Singles Chart, number 16 on the New Zealand Hot Singles chart, and number 57 in South Africa.

== Music video ==
A music video of the song was uploaded to West's official channel on May 8, 2022. It showcases photos of West, most of which are taken from his childhood, with their faces animated to sync with the song's lyrics. All photos are edited to change Kanye's apparel to clothing from the Yeezy Gap Engineered by Balenciaga drop, which released later that month on May 27. The music video doesn't feature any of André 3000's vocals, possibly due to the controversy of the song being released without consent of his verses being censored. The video ends with a short video of West rapping, taken when he was a child.

== Personnel ==
Credits adapted from Tidal.

Music

- Dem Jointz – additional production
- Federico Vindver – additional production
- Fonzworth Bentley – additional production, vocal production
- Ojivolta – additional production
- BoogzDaBeast – co-production
- The Twilite Tone – co-production

Technical

- Maurizio "Irko" Sera – master engineering, mix engineering, remixing
- Rashade Benani Bevel - mix assistance
- Alejandro Rodriguez-Dawson – record engineering
- Andrew Drucker – record engineering
- Josh Berg – record engineering
- Kalam Ali Muttalib – record engineering

== Charts ==
Chart performance for "Life of the Party"
Chart (2021)	Peak position
Ireland (IRMA)	96
New Zealand Hot Singles (RMNZ)	16
South Africa Streaming (TOSAC)	57
US Bubbling Under Hot 100 (Billboard)	13
US Hot Christian Songs (Billboard)	3
US Hot Gospel Songs (Billboard)	3
US Hot R&B/Hip-Hop Songs (Billboard)	47

== Certifications ==
Certifications for "Life of the Party"
Region	Certification	Certified units/sales
United States (RIAA)	Gold	500,000^{‡}
^{‡} Sales+streaming figures based on certification alone.
