= Remote Control (Kanye West song) =

2021 song by Kanye West

Song by Kanye West featuring Young Thug

from the album Donda
- Released: August 29, 2021
- Recorded: May 26 – August 2021
- Length: 3:19
- Label: GOOD; Def Jam
- Songwriters: Kanye West; Charles Njapa; Jeffery Williams; Kevin Gomringer; Mark Williams; Mike Dean; Nasir Pemberton; Raul Cubina; Travis Darelle Walton; Tim Gomringer
- Producers: Kanye West; Cubeatz; Digital Nas; Ojivolta

"Remote Control" is a song by American rapper Kanye West from his tenth studio album Donda (2021). The song, which features vocals from fellow American rapper Young Thug, was produced by West alongside Cubeatz, Digital Nas, and Ojivolta, being co-produced by 88-Keys and Mike Dean with additional production from Teddy Walton.

== Background ==
In April 2021, music producer Digital Nas was invited to work with West in Los Angeles after West had heard some of his songs through Mowalola Ogunlesi, who is the design director for West's Yeezy Gap collaboration. Digital Nas gave West a folder of 150 beats, of which West freestyled over approximately 60 of them. Only two of those 60 made the album – "Junya" and "Remote Control", with four of them originally expected to make the track listing. Talking about the songs, Digital Nas said: "That sound was so mantra-like. It was just simple. It was like a feeling. [Ye and I] call it monk music".

Young Thug's feature on the track came about after warning West that their friendship would come to an end if he was not to be included on the album, saying "I just hit Kanye like, 'Bro, if I ain't on the album, we are not speaking". Young Thug clarified that his contribution to the song was not inspired or instructed by West.

American rapper Soulja Boy originally recorded a verse for the track, although he was not included on the final version of the song. Following the album's release, Soulja Boy shared a snippet of his verse on Instagram, with the caption of the post saying "Fuck Kanye". Soulja Boy expressed distaste towards West secretly taking his verse off, posting a series of tweets aimed at West, saying that "if he didn’t like the verse he should have said that". On November 5, 2021, in an interview with N.O.R.E. on Drink Champs, West said that he believed that Soulja Boy is one of the top 5 most influential artists, and when asked why he was taken off Donda, West joked "You ain't hear that verse?". N.O.R.E. asked "The verse wasn't good?", and West followed up with "Nah, I'll tell you what though, Soulja Boy is the future, Future the future...". Soulja Boy responded to the interview, saying that West's words on Drink Champs stunned him and claimed that West had praised his verse in person.

== Composition ==
The song contains a sample from the 2012 animated short film Strawinsky and the Mysterious House, known in Internet and meme culture for the "Globglogabgalab", a song sung by the character of the same name in the film. Though unconfirmed as a direct causation, the sample was added after YouTuber Videogamedunkey created a fake leak of Donda, which included a sample of "Globglogabgalab".

== Pt 2 ==
Following the album's first listening party, a fan asked West's Kids See Ghosts cohort Kid Cudi via Twitter if he would be featured on the album, to which Cudi responded he was not. However, Cudi's vocals were later heard at the album's second listening session. Cudi would go on to detail how West subsequently reached out to him following the tweet, leading Cudi to record verses for "Moon" and "Remote Control". His verse was previewed at the second listening session on August 6, 2021, but was taken off the song when it was officially released on August 29, 2021, in favor of the "Globglogabgalab" sample. On October 27, 2021, the Stem Player was made available by West, which included three previously unreleased tracks as well as a version of "Remote Control" that re-adds Kid Cudi's original contribution. "Remote Control pt 2" was officially released as part of the deluxe version of Donda on November 14, 2021.

== Personnel ==
- Kanye West – vocals, production, songwriting
- Kid Cudi — vocals (Pt. 2)
- Young Thug – featured vocals, songwriting
- Cubeatz
  - Tim Gomringer – production, songwriting, keyboards
  - Kevin Gomringer – production, songwriting, keyboards
- Digital Nas – production, songwriting, programming
- Ojivolta
  - Mark Williams – production, songwriting, keyboards
  - Raul Cubina – production, songwriting, keyboards
- 88-Keys – co-production, songwriting
- Mike Dean – co-production, songwriting
- Teddy Walton – additional production, songwriting, programming
- Brandee Younger – harp

Technical

- Irko – mixing, mastering
- Alejandro Rodriguez-Dawsøn – recording
- Bainz – recording
- Jonathan Pfzar – recording
- Josh Berg – recording
- Mikalai Skrobat – recording
- Roark Bailey – recording
- Will Chason – recording assistance
- Louis Bell – vocal editing
- Cirkut – vocal production

== Charts ==
=== Weekly charts ===
Weekly chart performance for "Remote Control"
Chart (2021)	Peak position
Australia (ARIA)	34
Canada Hot 100 (Billboard)	39
France (SNEP)	151
Global 200 (Billboard)	38
South Africa (TOSAC)	20
US Billboard Hot 100	40
US Hot Christian Songs (Billboard)	11
US Gospel Songs (Billboard)	11
US Hot R&B/Hip-Hop Songs (Billboard)	20

=== Year-end charts ===
2021 year-end chart performance for "Remote Control"
Chart (2021)	Position
US Christian Songs (Billboard)	48
US Gospel Songs (Billboard)	15
