= Ok Ok (song) =

2021 song by Kanye West

Song by Kanye West

from the album Donda
- Released: August 29, 2021
- Recorded: August 12, 2018; July 14, 2019; July–August 2021
- Genre: Hip-hop
- Length: 3:25
- Label: GOOD; Def Jam
- Songwriters: Kanye West; Miles McCollum; Denzel Charles; Matthew Samuels; Louis Bell; Terrence Thornton; Maxie Rhyles III; Cydel Young; Malik Yusef; Billie Walsh; Orlando Wilder; Tobias Smith; Rennard East
- Producers: Kanye West; Boi-1da

"Ok Ok" is a song by American rapper Kanye West from his tenth studio album, Donda (2021). The song features vocals from Lil Yachty and Rooga. Rooga recorded his verse after Lil Yachty at Mercedes-Benz Stadium in 2021. A second version was recorded under the title of "Ok Ok Pt 2", featuring vocals from Shenseea.

== Background ==
Speaking to DJ Vlad in October 2021, rapper Rooga revealed that he joined West for the recording sessions of Donda that were held at Atlanta's Mercedes-Benz Stadium in 2021. Rooga first heard "Ok Ok" with fellow rapper Lil Yachty's verse, before he recorded his verse while the rapper was present. He was honored to work with an artist of West's magnitude and realized his elevated position in music, understanding his purpose and not to give up. Rooga believed there was a reason West reached out to him; he finalized that it showed he is at the same status as his other collaborators. The rapper had previously performed for a listening event of the album at Soldier Field in Chicago. "Ok Ok" was released as the eight track of West's tenth studio album Donda on August 29, 2021.

== Pt 2 ==
"Ok Ok pt 2"

Song by Kanye West

from the album Donda
- Released: August 29, 2021
- Length: 3:25
- Label: GOOD; Def Jam
- Songwriters: Kanye West; Lee Charles; Matthew Samuels; Louis Bell; Terrence Thornton; Maxie Rhyles III; Cydel Young; Malik Yusef; Billie Walsh; Orlando Wilder; Tobias Smith; Rennard East
- Producers: Kanye West; Boi-1da

A second version of the song, titled "Ok Ok pt 2", was included as the 25th track of Donda on August 29, 2021. Speaking with Gabe P on Power 105.1 in October 2021, who cited the song as one of his favorites on the record, Jamaican singer-songwriter Shenseea said her work with West came about after he watched her freestyle. West then wanted her to appear on the album, promptly getting in contact with her team. The singer was also seen putting make-up on in her car during the album's Chicago listening event, recalling this as non-stop work as she enjoys. Reflecting on her collaboration with West in 2024, Shenseea cited it as a moment when she recognized going through a shift in her career. Shenseea said that this opened her up to new opportunities across fashion, hip hop, and different artists reaching out, while she considered West to be both artistic and "a cool person to look at".

== Charts ==
=== Weekly charts ===
Chart performance for "Ok Ok"
Chart (2021)	Peak position
Australia (ARIA)	22
Canada Hot 100 (Billboard)	12
Denmark (Tracklisten)	35
France (SNEP)	116
Global 200 (Billboard)	11
Iceland (Tónlistinn)	23
Lithuania (AGATA)	41
Portugal (AFP)	59
Slovakia (Singles Digitál Top 100)	66
South Africa (TOSAC)	12
Sweden (Sverigetopplistan)	64
US Billboard Hot 100	12
US Hot Christian Songs (Billboard)	4
US Gospel Songs (Billboard)	4
US Hot R&B/Hip-Hop Songs (Billboard)	5

Chart performance for "Ok Ok pt 2"
Chart (2021)	Peak position
Australia (ARIA)	76
Portugal (AFP)	149
South Africa (TOSAC)	40
UK Hip Hop/R&B (Official Charts)	35

=== Year-end charts ===
2021 year-end chart performance for "Ok Ok"
Chart (2021)	Position
US Christian Songs (Billboard)	25
US Gospel Songs (Billboard)	8
