= New Again (song) =

Song by Kanye West

from the album Donda
- Released: August 29, 2021
- Recorded: May – August 2021
- Genre: Gospel; progressive rap; EDM
- Length: 3:03
- Label: GOOD; Def Jam
- Songwriters: Charles Njapa; Christopher Brown; Dwayne Abernathy Jr.; Jahmal Gwin; Kanye West; Laraya Robinson; Mark Williams; Nima Jahanbin; Paimon Jahanbin; Raul Cubina
- Producers: Kanye West; BoogzDaBeast; Dem Jointz (Note: Credited as co-producer); Ojivolta; Wallis Lane; Mia Wallis; 88-Keys (Note: Credited as additional producer)

Audio
- "New Again" on YouTube

"New Again" is a song by American rapper Kanye West from his tenth studio album Donda (2021). The song's original version featured vocals from American singer Chris Brown.

== Background ==
"New Again"
A sample of the chorus, expressing gratitude to God.

Brown and West previously collaborated on "Down", off Brown's second studio album Exclusive (2007), "Deuces (Remix)" in 2010 and on "Waves", off Kanye seventh studio album The Life of Pablo (2016). Brown’s involvement on "New Again" was first announced by him on July 20, 2021 on his Instagram account, posting a story where he wrote “Dat Yeezy and Breezy”. The song was first officially previewed at the listening party at Mercedes Benz Stadium on July 22, with West doing the hook instead of Brown and the choir.

Chris Brown does vocals on the hook along with Sunday Service Choir, but originally had a longer verse on the song that didn't make the album. Just a few hours after Donda became available on streaming platforms, Brown posted an Instagram story where he wrote "Kanye a whole hoe", then later following it up with "Nah he tweakin'". According to TMZ, a source close to Brown revealed that he wasn't happy about his verse being removed from the song. On September 5, Brown leaked his full verse on Instagram with the caption: "The verse / chorus I mysteriously didn’t do!". The removed verse consisted of Brown asking God for forgiveness due to his reluctance to change his sinful lifestyle, including references to the abuse of percocets and sexual orgies. Several critics expressed negative responses to West's choice to remove the verse, including the co-host of The Breakfast Club, Charlamagne tha God, that defined the verse discard as a "poor choice musically".

On September 28, the song was reuploaded to streaming services with Brown's vocals removed and replaced with West singing his parts. It is unknown if the removal of Brown's vocals were a result of the controversy regarding the cut verse.

== Personnel ==
Credits adapted from Tidal.

- Additional vocals – Sunday Service Choir
- Choir arrangement – Jason White, Nikki Grier
- Mixing engineer – Irko
- Recording engineer – Alejandro Rodriguez–Dawsøn, Josh Berg, Mikalai Skrobat
- Vocal editing – Louis Bell

== Charts ==
=== Weekly charts ===
Chart performance for "New Again"
Chart (2021)	Peak position
Australia (ARIA)	46
Canada Hot 100 (Billboard)	57
Global 200 (Billboard)	56
Lithuania (AGATA)	62
Portugal (AFP)	103
South Africa (TOSAC)	28
UK Hip Hop/R&B (Official Charts)	21
US Billboard Hot 100	68
US Hot Christian Songs (Billboard)	20
US Gospel Songs (Billboard)	19
US Hot R&B/Hip-Hop Songs (Billboard)	32

=== Year-end charts ===
2021 year-end chart performance for "New Again"
Chart (2021)	Position
US Christian Songs (Billboard)	67
US Gospel Songs (Billboard)	27
