= Bri (musician) =

American singer

Briana Babineaux
- Also known as: Bri, Bebe
- Born: August 26, 1994 (age 31); Honolulu, Hawaii
- Origin: Lafayette, Louisiana
- Genres: Urban contemporary gospel
- Occupations: Singer, songwriter
- Instrument: Vocals
- Years active: 2014–present
- Label: Tyscot

Briana Babineaux (born August 26, 1994), who goes by the stage name Bri, is an American urban contemporary gospel artist and musician. She started her music career, in 2015, with releasing a live album, Keys to My Heart (2016), by Tyscot Records. This album charted on three Billboard magazine charts.

== Early life ==
Babineaux was born on August 26, 1994, in Honolulu, Hawaii to a military father, who served in the Marines. Her father, Shawnta Babineaux, moved the family back to his hometown of Lafayette, Louisiana, when she was three months of age. Babineaux's parents got divorced, when she was two years old. She was raised by her mother, Shannon Miller, and her step-father, Louis Miller, who is a pastor at House Of Freedom, in Lafayette, Louisiana. She began singing at three years old, eventually graduating from Northside High School in Lafayette, Louisiana as a member of their 2012 graduating class. While in high school, she was a member of the volleyball and track teams, earning a scholarship to McNeese State University, yet she only stayed one semester because her interest in athletics waned. She stands 5-foot 6 inches tall. Babineaux eventually settled on her music and academics, while changing universities to the University of Louisiana at Lafayette, where she is majoring in criminal justice.

== Music career ==
Her music career started in 2014, with her YouTube channel by posting videos of her singing, where they have received hundreds of thousands of views. She started professionally recording music in 2015, with her first live album, Keys to My Heart that released on March 25, 2016, from Tyscot Records. This album charted on three Billboard magazine charts, while it placed on the Billboard 200, Top Gospel Albums, and Independent Albums charts, where it peaked at Nos. 138, 1, and 9, respectively.

== Discography ==
List of Albums, with selected chart positions
Title	Album details	Peak chart positions		
Title	Album details	US 200	US Gos	US Ind
Keys to My Heart	Released: March 25, 2016; Label: Tyscot; CD, digital download	138	1	9
