= Irko =

Italian audio engineer (born 1981)

- Born: Maurizio Sera; September 30, 1981 (age 45); Conegliano, Treviso, Italy
- Genre: Hip hop
- Occupations: Mix Engineer, Engineer
- Years active: 2000–present
- Website: irko.it

Maurizio Sera (born September 30, 1981), known professionally as Irko (stylized in all caps) is an Italian audio engineer currently based in Los Angeles, California.

== Career ==
Irko was born and raised in Conegliano, getting his start in music producing beats and working as a DJ. He gravitated towards hip hop because of the "heavy hitting" boom bap drums and bass. Irko enrolled in computer science in Venice, which he described as "the most boring thing I could imagine". He started studying audio engineering after finding himself "explaining to the actual engineer how to do his job" and coming across a poster asking "Do you want to learn how to work in a recording studio?" He opened his first studio in his dad's garage, having people stationed in a nearby American Air-Force base join recording sessions.

In the early 2000s, Irko was getting recognition and building connections on MySpace. In 2006, Irko was invited to New York by Tokyo-based producer B-Money, whom he had met on MySpace. Despite not having much money, he convinced himself to travel so that he could learn how a bigger recording studio works. When arriving there, Irko was invited to work on Jay-Z's Kingdom Come album with B-Money, which led to him landing a recording credit for the song "The Prelude". He later moved to Los Angeles, where he has been living and working for 10 years.

Irko has since worked with artists such as 88-Keys and Kanye West, mixing the song "Stay Up! (Viagra)", and later mixing West's album Donda in 2021. In 2024, he did updated mixes for West and Ty Dolla Sign's collaborative album Vultures 2. In 2026, he contributed as a sound designer and mix engineer to the South Korean rapper T.O.P’s album Another Dimension. Later that year, he was also responsible for the updated mixes on the deluxe edition of Bully by Kanye West.
