= Antagonist Tour =

2025 concert tour by Playboi Carti

- Tour by Playboi Carti
- Location: North America
- Associated albums: Music
- Start date: October 3, 2025
- End date: December 1, 2025
- No. of shows: 31
- Supporting acts: Ken Carson; Destroy Lonely; Homixide Gang; ApolloRed1
- Website: tour.playboicarti.com

Playboi Carti concert chronology
- King Vamp Tour (2021); Antagonist Tour (2025)

The Antagonist Tour, marketed as Antagonist 2.0, was the fifth concert tour by American rapper Playboi Carti in support of his third studio album, Music (2025). The tour began on October 3, 2025, in Salt Lake City, Utah, and concluded on December 1, 2025, in Atlanta, Georgia. Spanning 31 shows across the United States, the tour was originally scheduled to begin in North America in September 2023, before extending to Europe later in the year, which resulted in multiple postponements and cancellations. Supporting acts included Carti's Opium labelmates Ken Carson, (Note: In support of his album More Chaos (2025)) Destroy Lonely, (Note: In support of his mixtape ᐸ/3³ (2025)) and Homixide Gang, (Note: In support of their album Homixide Lifestyle 2 (2025)) as well as affiliate Apollo Red. (Note: In support of his album Midnight Blassic (2025) and mixtape ApolloRed1 vs the World (2025))

== Background ==
The Antagonist Tour was first announced in July 2023 as a global arena tour in support of Playboi Carti's then-upcoming third studio album, Music (2025), featuring support from his Opium label collective—Ken Carson, Destroy Lonely, and Homixide Gang. Originally slated to begin in September 2023 in North America before continuing in Europe, the tour was postponed to January 2024, with the revised itinerary beginning in Europe in November 2023. Subsequently, all scheduled dates were removed, and both the North American and European legs were canceled in their entirety.

Following this cancellation, Carti joined the Weeknd as an opening act on the 2025 North American leg of the After Hours til Dawn Tour. Later that year, the Antagonist Tour was relaunched. The rescheduled tour was announced as a 28-date North American arena run, beginning on October 3, 2025, in Salt Lake City and concluding on December 1, 2025, in Atlanta, with returning acts Ken Carson, Destroy Lonely, and Homixide Gang, as well as Apollo Red, serving as the supporting acts. On September 8, 2025, three additional dates were added in Texas.

== Set list ==
The following set list is obtained from the October 3, 2025, show in Utah. It is not representative of all dates throughout the tour.

=== Apollo Red set ===
1. "#ARP"
2. "Georgia Boy"
3. "RedFlag"
4. "Face Tattoos"
5. "PBrazy"
6. "Tripp H"

=== Homixide Gang set ===
1. "Lifestyle"/"PC5"
2. "Redrag"
3. "Villain"
4. "5G"
5. "R50"
6. "Facet!me"
7. "Uzi Work"
8. "Drakon !"
9. "5unna"

=== Destroy Lonely set ===
1. "Party N Get High (Interlude)"
2. "How U Feel?"
3. "Fake Niggas"
4. "Syrup Sippin"
5. "Jumanji"
6. "If Looks Could Kill"
7. "No Stylist"
8. "Doubt It"
9. "Screwed Up"
10. "About Money"
11. "Blitz"
12. "Risk"
13. "Soooo High"
14. "STFU"

=== Ken Carson set ===
1. "Lord of Chaos"
2. "Blakk Rokkstar"
3. "Money Spread"
4. "Delusional"
5. "It's Over"
6. "Green Room"
7. "Mewtwo"
8. "I Need U"
9. "Succubus"
10. "Me n My Kup"
11. "Rock n Roll"
12. "Trap Jump"
13. "Freestyle 2"
14. "SS"
15. "Overseas"
16. "Fighting My Demons"

=== Playboi Carti set ===
1. "Pop Out" (played two times)
2. "Opm Babi"
3. "Crank"
4. "Cocaine Nose"
5. "Overly"
6. "Charge Dem Hoes a Fee"
7. "K Pop"
8. "Like Weezy"
9. "Good Credit"
10. "HBA"
11. "Can You Stand the Rain"
12. "Timeless"
13. "Wake Up F1lthy"
14. "Stop Breathing"
15. "Rockstar Made"
16. "Alive"
17. "FOMDJ"
18. "Evil J0rdan"
19. "R.I.P."
20. "ILoveUIHateU"
21. "2024"
22. "Olympian"
23. "Fein"
24. "Type Shit"
25. "Long Time (Intro)"
26. "Pop Out" (played four times)
27. "South Atlanta Baby"

== Tour dates ==
List of 2025 concerts, showing date, city and venue
Date (2025)	City	Country	Venue	Attendance	Revenue
October 3	Salt Lake City	United States	Delta Center	11,672 / 12,045 (96,9%)	—
October 5	Portland	United States	Moda Center	10,967 / 12,455 (88%)	—
October 8	Seattle	United States	Climate Pledge Arena	8,836 / 13,222 (67%)	—
October 10	San Francisco	United States	Chase Center	10,653 / 11,044 (96%)	—
October 12	Sacramento	United States	Golden 1 Center	8,952 / 12,438 (72%)	—
October 14	Los Angeles	United States	Crypto.com Arena	13,006 / 14,151 (91,9%)	—
October 17	Phoenix	United States	Mortgage Matchup Center	8,966 / 12,672 (70,7%)	—
October 18	Las Vegas	United States	MGM Grand Garden Arena	5,921 / 6,378 (82,4%)	—
October 20	Denver	United States	Ball Arena	8,931 / 13,480 (66,3%)	—
October 23	Saint Paul	United States	Grand Casino Arena	12,208 / 12,347 (98,9%)	—
October 24	Kansas City	United States	T-Mobile Center	5,737 / 12,000 (48%)	—
October 25	St. Louis	United States	Enterprise Center	—	—
October 28	Columbus	United States	Nationwide Arena	—	—
October 30	Chicago	United States	United Center	13,098 / 13,098 (100%)	—
October 31	Detroit	United States	Little Caesars Arena	12,155 / 12,783 (95,09%)	—
November 1	Pittsburgh	United States	PPG Paints Arena	—	—
November 4	Boston	United States	TD Garden	10,338 / 11,364 (91%)	—
November 6	New York City	United States	Barclays Center	12,363 / 12,363 (100%)	—
November 7	Newark	United States	Prudential Center	11,637/11,637 (100%)	—
November 8	Hartford	United States	PeoplesBank Arena	9,892 / 13,015 (76%)	—
November 10	Philadelphia	United States	Xfinity Mobile Arena	—	—
November 11	Washington, D.C.	United States	Capital One Arena	—	—
November 13	Raleigh	United States	Lenovo Center	6,798 / 11,983	—
November 14	Charlotte	United States	Spectrum Center	8,562 / 12,112	—
November 16	Sunrise	United States	Amerant Bank Arena	—	—
November 20	Houston	United States	Toyota Center	—	—
November 21	Fort Worth	United States	Dickies Arena	—	—
November 23	Austin	United States	Moody Center	—	—
November 28	Nashville	United States	Bridgestone Arena	8,536 / 13,126	—
November 30	Tampa	United States	Benchmark International Arena	—	—
December 1	Atlanta	United States	State Farm Arena	11,948 / 11,948	—

=== Guest performers ===
- At the Los Angeles concert, Carti and Kendrick Lamar performed "Good Credit", as well as bringing out ASAP Rocky and Fakemink.
- At the Philadelphia concert, Meek Mill made a surprise appearance
- At the Tampa concert, Trippie Redd made a surprise appearance; the two performed "Miss the Rage" together that day, marking their first live performance of the track together since its release
- At the Atlanta concert, Latto surprised the crowd by joining Carti; the two performed "Blick Sum"
