= BET Awards 2025 =

American entertainment awards ceremony

2025 BET Awards
- Date: June 9, 2025
- Location: Peacock Theater, Los Angeles, California
- Presented by: Black Entertainment Television
- Hosted by: Kevin Hart

Highlights
- Most awards: Kendrick Lamar (5)
- Most nominations: Kendrick Lamar (10)
- Website: www.bet.com/shows/bet-awards.html

Television/radio coverage
- Network: BET; BET Her, MTV, MTV2, CMT, Nick@Nite, Paramount Network, Pop TV, Logo TV, VH1 (simulcast)
- Produced by: Jesse Collins; Connie Orlando; Jennae Rouzan-Clay; Dionne Harmon; Jamal Nosette (executive producers); Eric Cook; Brittany Brazil (co-executive producers)
- Directed by: Marcelo Gama; Ali LeRoi

The 25th BET Awards was held on June 9, 2025, at the Peacock Theater in Los Angeles, California, to celebrate achievements in entertainment and honors music, sports, television, and movies. Actor and comedian Kevin Hart hosted for the second time since 2011. This was the first time the ceremony aired on a Monday, the first time it aired earlier in June since 2001, and the first time it did not air on a Sunday since 2008 (when it typically aired on a Tuesday).

On May 7, 2025, a 25th anniversary celebration of 106 & Park was announced, featuring a reunion of its hosts and performances by several popular guests.

The nominations were announced on May 8, 2025, with Kendrick Lamar leading with ten, and Doechii, Drake, Future and GloRilla following with six each. Lamar was the most awarded of the night, winning five awards.

On May 28, 2025, Mariah Carey, Jamie Foxx, Snoop Dogg and Kirk Franklin were announced as honorees of the Ultimate Icon Award.

The BET Awards 2025 Red Carpet Live pre-show featured a performance of the song "Boots on the Ground" by 803fresh.

== Performers ==
Artist(s)	Song(s)
Main show
Ashanti; Jim Jones; Amerie; Keyshia Cole; Mýa; T.I. B2K; Bow Wow; Jermaine Dupri	106 & Park 25th Anniversary Celebration: "Happy" "Rock wit U (Awww Baby)" "Foolish" "We Fly High" "1 Thing" "I Should Have Cheated" "Case of the Ex" "Bring Em Out" "What You Know" "Bump, Bump, Bump" "Like You" "Fresh Azimiz"
Leon Thomas	"Mutt"
Mariah Carey; Anderson .Paak; Rakim	"Type Dangerous" "It's Like That"
Lil Wayne	"King Carter" "Welcome to Tha Carter" "A Milli"
GloRilla; Keyshia Cole	"Let Her Cook" "Typa"
Luke James; Miles Caton; Lucky Daye	Tribute to Quincy Jones: "The Secret Garden (Sweet Seduction Suite)"
Craig Robinson; Babyface; Ludacris; Tank; Jennifer Hudson; Doug E. Fresh; T-Pain; Teddy Riley	Tribute to Jamie Foxx: "Unpredictable" "Night Time Is the Right Time" "I Got a Woman" "Blame It"
Teyana Taylor	"Fire Girl" "Long Time"
Ledisi	"BLKWMN"
Playboi Carti; DJ Swamp Izzo	"Like Weezy" "Rather Lie"
Andra Day	Tribute to Roberta Flack: "Killing Me Softly with His Song"
Snoop Dogg; Charlie Wilson; Kurupt; Warren G	"Iz It a Crime?" "Unsung Heroes" "Drop It Like It's Hot" "Nuthin' but a 'G' Thang" "The Next Episode" "Beautiful" "Outstanding" "Down for My N's" "Ain't No Fun (If the Homies Can't Have None)" "Gin and Juice"
Brittney Spencer	Tribute to Angie Stone: "No More Rain (In This Cloud)"
Kirk Franklin; Tamar Braxton; Muni Long; Jamal Roberts; D.C. Young Fly; Salt	"Silver & Gold" "I Smile" "Do It Again" "Melodies From Heaven" "Revolution" "Stomp" (contains elements from "Uptown Funk")
BET Amplified Stage
Ravyn Lenae	"Love Me Not"
Elmiene	"Crystal Tears"

== Presenters ==
- Kevin Hart - Host
- Keshia Chanté, Terrence J, Julissa, Big Tigger & Free introduced the 106 & Park 25th Anniversary Celebration
- Quinta Brunson & Tyler James Williams presented Best Female Hiphop Artist
- Kevin Hart introduced Leon Thomas
- Ciara introduced Ravyn Lenae
- Kevin Hart introduced Mariah Carey, Anderson. Paak & Rakim
- Crystal Renee Hayslett presented Best Female R&B/Pop Artist
- Kevin Hart introduced Lil Wayne
- Deon Cole & Dominique Thorne presented Best New Artist
- Kevin Hart introduced GloRilla
- Stevie Wonder presented the Ultimate Icon Award to Jamie Foxx
- Craig Robinson introduced the Tribute to Jamie Foxx
- Marques Houston introduced Elmiene
- Kerry Washington introduced Teyana Taylor
- Keke Palmer presented Album of The Year
- Tyler Perry introduced Ledisi
- Druski, Kai Cenat & Kevin Hart introduced Playboi Carti
- D.C. Young Fly presented the Viewer's Choice Award
- Busta Rhymes presented the Ultimate Icon Award to Mariah Carey
- Dr. Dre presented the Ultimate Icon Award to Snoop Dogg
- DeVon Franklin, LeToya Luckett & La La Anthony presented the Dr. Bobby Jones Best Gospel/Inspirational Award
- T.I. presented the Ultimate Icon Award to Kirk Franklin

== Winners and nominees ==
Below is the list of winners and nominees. Winners are listed first and highlighted in bold.

Album of the Year	Video of the Year
**GNX – Kendrick Lamar**; 11:11 (Deluxe) – Chris Brown; Alligator Bites Never Heal – Doechii; Cowboy Carter – Beyoncé; Glorious – GloRilla; Hurry Up Tomorrow – The Weeknd; Some Sexy Songs 4 U – Drake and PartyNextDoor; We Don't Trust You – Future and Metro Boomin	**"Not Like Us" – Kendrick Lamar**; "3AM in Tokeyo" – Key Glock; "A Bar Song (Tipsy)" – Shaboozey; "After Hours" – Kehlani; "Denial Is a River" – Doechii; "Family Matters" – Drake; "Timeless" – The Weeknd featuring Playboi Carti; "Type Shit" – Future and Metro Boomin featuring Travis Scott and Playboi Carti
Viewer's Choice Award	Best Collaboration
**"Residuals" – Chris Brown**; "Denial Is a River" – Doechii; "Nokia" – Drake; "Like That" – Future and Metro Boomin featuring Kendrick Lamar; "TGIF" – GloRilla; "Not Like Us" – Kendrick Lamar; "Luther" – Kendrick Lamar featuring SZA; "Brokey" – Latto	**"Luther" – Kendrick Lamar featuring SZA**; "30 for 30" – SZA featuring Kendrick Lamar; "Alter Ego" – Doechii featuring JT; "Are You Even Real" – Teddy Swims featuring Giveon; "Beckham" – Dee Billz featuring Kyle Richh, Kai Swervo and KJ Swervo; "Bless" – Lil Wayne, Wheezy and Young Thug; "Like That" – Future and Metro Boomin featuring Kendrick Lamar; "Sticky" – Tyler, the Creator featuring GloRilla, Sexyy Red and Lil Wayne; "Timeless" – The Weeknd featuring Playboi Carti
Best Male R&B/Pop Artist	Best Female R&B/Pop Artist
**Chris Brown**; Bruno Mars; Drake; Fridayy; Leon Thomas; Teddy Swims; The Weeknd; Usher	**SZA**; Ari Lennox; Ayra Starr; Coco Jones; Kehlani; Muni Long; Summer Walker; Victoria Monét
Best Female Hip Hop Artist	Best Male Hip Hop Artist
**Doechii**; Cardi B; Doja Cat; GloRilla; Latto; Megan Thee Stallion; Nicki Minaj; Rapsody; Sexyy Red	**Kendrick Lamar**; BigXthaPlug; BossMan Dlow; Burna Boy; Drake; Future; Key Glock; Lil Wayne; Tyler, the Creator
Best New Artist	Best Group
**Leon Thomas**; 41; Ayra Starr; BigXthaPlug; BossMan Dlow; Dee Billz; October London; Shaboozey; Teddy Swims	**Future and Metro Boomin**; 41; Common and Pete Rock; Drake and PartyNextDoor; Flo; Jacquees and Dej Loaf; Larry June, 2 Chainz and The Alchemist; Maverick City Music
BET Her Award	Dr. Bobby Jones Best Gospel/Inspirational Award
**"Heart of a Woman" – Summer Walker**; "Beautiful People" – Mary J. Blige; "Blackbiird" – Beyoncé; "Bloom" – Doechii; "Burning"– Tems; "Defying Gravity" – Cynthia Erivo and Ariana Grande; "Hold On" – Tems; "In My Bag" – Flo and GloRilla	**"Rain Down on Me" – GloRilla featuring Kirk Franklin and Maverick City Music**; "A God (There Is)" – Common and Pete Rock featuring Jennifer Hudson; "Amen" – Pastor Mike Jr.; "Better Days" – Fridayy; "Church Doors" – Yolanda Adams featuring Sir the Baptist and Donald Lawrence; "Constant" – Maverick City Music, Jordin Sparks, Chandler Moore and Anthony Gargiula; "Deserve to Win" – Tamela Mann; "Faith" – Rapsody
Video Director of the Year	Best Movie
**Dave Free and Kendrick Lamar**; Anderson .Paak; B Pace Productions and Jacquees; Benny Boom; Cactus Jack; Cole Bennett; Dave Meyers; Foggieraw; Tyler, the Creator	**Luther: Never Too Much**; Bad Boys: Ride or Die; Beverly Hills Cop: Axel F; One of Them Days; Rebel Ridge; The Piano Lesson; The Six Triple Eight
Best Actor	Best Actress
**Denzel Washington**; Aaron Pierre; Aldis Hodge; Anthony Mackie; Colman Domingo; Jamie Foxx; Joey Badass; Kevin Hart; Sterling K. Brown; Will Smith	**Cynthia Erivo**; Andra Day; Angela Bassett; Coco Jones; Keke Palmer; Kerry Washington; Quinta Brunson; Viola Davis; Zendaya
Sportswoman of the Year	Sportsman of the Year
**Angel Reese**; A'ja Wilson; Claressa Shields; Coco Gauff; Dawn Staley; Flau'jae Johnson; JuJu Watkins; Sha'Carri Richardson; Simone Biles	**Jalen Hurts**; Aaron Judge; Anthony Edwards; Deion Sanders; Jayson Tatum; LeBron James; Saquon Barkley; Stephen Curry
Best International Act	Best New International Act
**Ayra Starr (Nigeria)**; Any Gabrielly (Brazil); Bashy (United Kingdom); Black Sherif (Ghana); Ezra Collective (United Kingdom); Joé Dwèt Filé (France); MC Luanna (Brazil); Rema (Nigeria); SDM (France); Tyla (South Africa); Uncle Waffles (Swaziland)	**Ajuliacosta (Brazil) and** **TxC (South Africa)**; Abigail Chams (Tanzania); Amabbi (Brazil); Dlala Thukzin (South Africa); Dr. Yaro (France); kwn (United Kingdom); Maglera Doe Boy (South Africa); Merveille (France); Odeal (United Kingdom); Shallipopi (Nigeria)
YoungStars Award	Ultimate Icon Award
**Blue Ivy Carter**; Akira Akbar; Graceyn Hollingsworth; Heiress Diana Harris; Melody Hurd; Thaddeus J. Mixon; Tyrik Johnson; Van Van	**Mariah Carey**; **Jamie Foxx**; **Snoop Dogg**; **Kirk Franklin**

== Controversy ==
The award ceremony was met with much controversy. Many gospel singers and gospel-based outlets and media criticized GloRilla winning the Dr. Bobby Jones Best Gospel/Inspirational Award for her song "Rain Down on Me". Most notably, gospel singer Deitrick Haddon expressed opposition and stated that the only award for gospel acts was not won by a gospel act but instead by rapper GloRilla.

During her appearance on the We Sound Crazy podcast, singer Chanté Moore expressed her disappointment in BET for not including former BET executive Stephen G. Hill in the 25th anniversary celebration of 106 & Park, an American hip hop and R&B music video show created by Hill. The award show featured a reunion of all former hosts.

Brittney Spencer performed "No More Rain (In This Cloud)" during the ceremony as a tribute to singer Angie Stone, who was killed in a car crash earlier in the year. However, Stone was not mentioned or featured during the "In Memoriam" segment of the show; a tribute honoring Black entertainers who died between 2024 and 2025, causing subsequent controversy.

== In Memoriam ==
- Cissy Houston
- James Earl Jones
- Wanda Smith
- Tito Jackson
- DJ Clark Kent
- Roy Ayers
- Frankie Beverly
- Lou Donaldson
- Nikki Giovanni
- Quincy Jones
- Chris Jasper
- Sacha Jenkins
- Voletta Wallace
- George Foreman
- Michael Sumler
- D'Wayne Wiggins
- John Edwards
- Yolanda Halley
- Clarence O. Smith
- Roberta Flack
- Sly Stone
- John Amos
- Richard Parsons
- Irv Gotti
- Sam Moore
- Barry Michael Cooper
- Wayne Lewis
- Judith Jamison
- DJ Unk
- Tony Todd
