= Good Credit =

2025 song by Playboi Carti and Kendrick Lamar

Song by Playboi Carti and Kendrick Lamar

from the album Music
- Released: March 14, 2025
- Genre: Trap
- Length: 3:10
- Label: AWGE; Interscope
- Songwriters: Jordan Carter; Kendrick Duckworth; Ronald LaTour Jr.
- Producer: Cardo

"Good Credit" (stylized in all caps) is a song by American rappers Playboi Carti and Kendrick Lamar. It was released through AWGE and Interscope Records as the fifteenth track from Carti's third studio album, Music, on March 14, 2025. The song was written by Playboi Carti and Kendrick Lamar, alongside producer Cardo.

== Composition ==
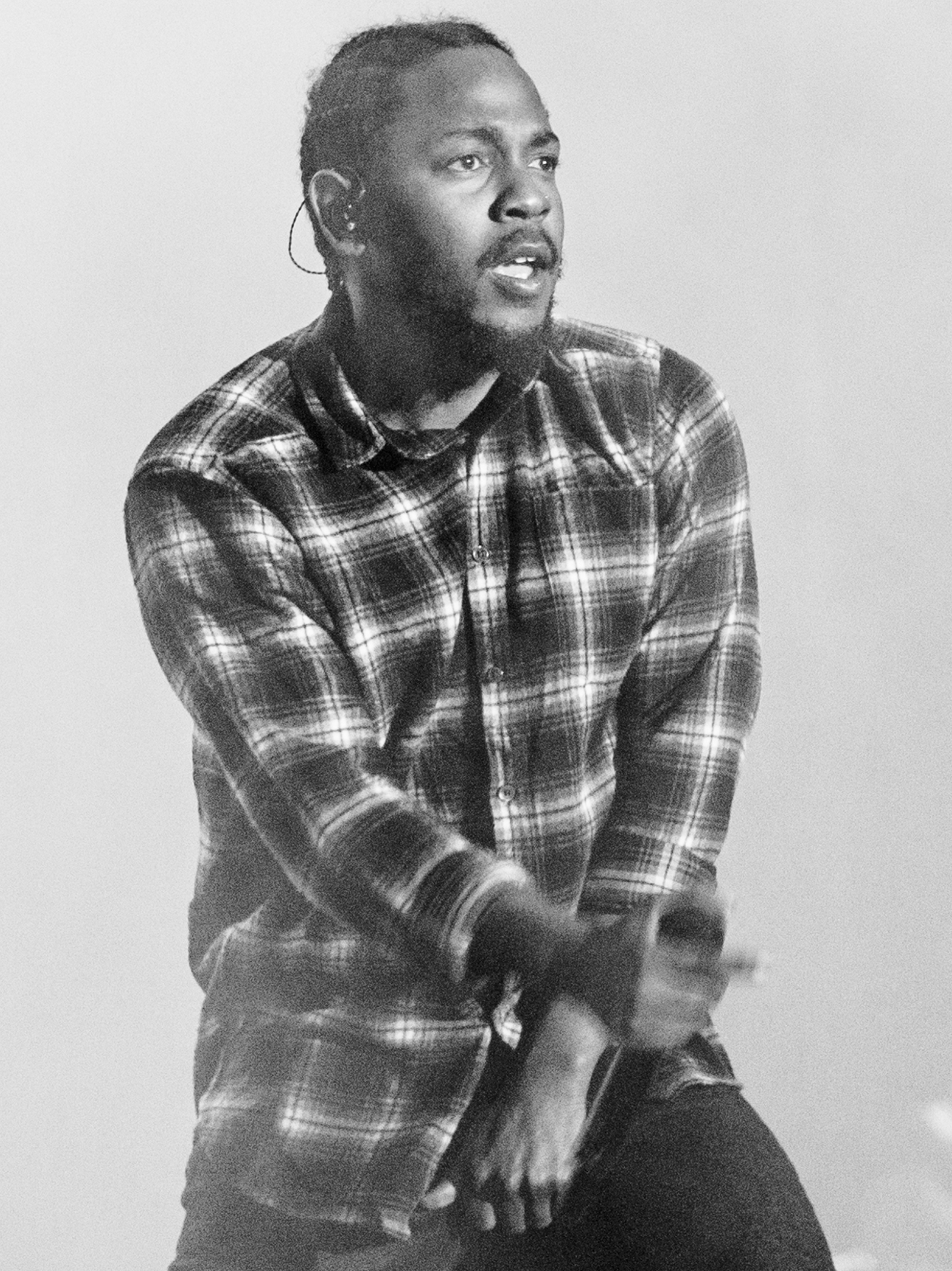
Kendrick Lamar, whose feature verse on "Good Credit" name-drops basketball player Luka Dončić and rapper ASAP Relli

The song features a verse from Lamar who name-drops Slovenian basketball player Luka Dončić and makes pointed remarks toward rapper ASAP Relli regarding his recent assault case involving ASAP Rocky. Lamar additionally refers to both Playboi Carti and Cardo, the producer of the song, as his "evil twin", to each one of them respectively. Some, such as DJ Akademiks, have suggested that Lamar's lyrics on "Good Credit", and his other two features, "Mojo Jojo" and "Backd00r", make subtle jabs at Canadian rapper Drake after their feud last year, he also claimed Lamar's involvement in the album's creative direction as he claims the rapper started to work together with Playboi Carti since October–November of 2024.

With streaming platforms lacking production credits for many songs on Music, some have speculated that Kanye West participated in the production of "Good Credit" due to its specific sample usage. However, such rumors have been dispelled. After the release of Music, West tweeted his disapproval over Lamar's inclusion on the album, like on songs like "Backd00r".

== Critical reception ==
Billboard ranked the song at first place in a list of the best guest features on Playboi Carti's Music, lauding Lamar's "razor-sharp wit and precision, as he taunts A$AP Relli and possibly rapper Drake while dissecting fame, wealth and power. He switches flows effortlessly, all while Carti’s high-energy charisma makes the Compton rapper’s controlled delivery pack that much more of a punch." Billboard also called it the fourth best song in Music, lauding the strength of the collaboration between Playboi Carti and Lamar.

== Live performances ==
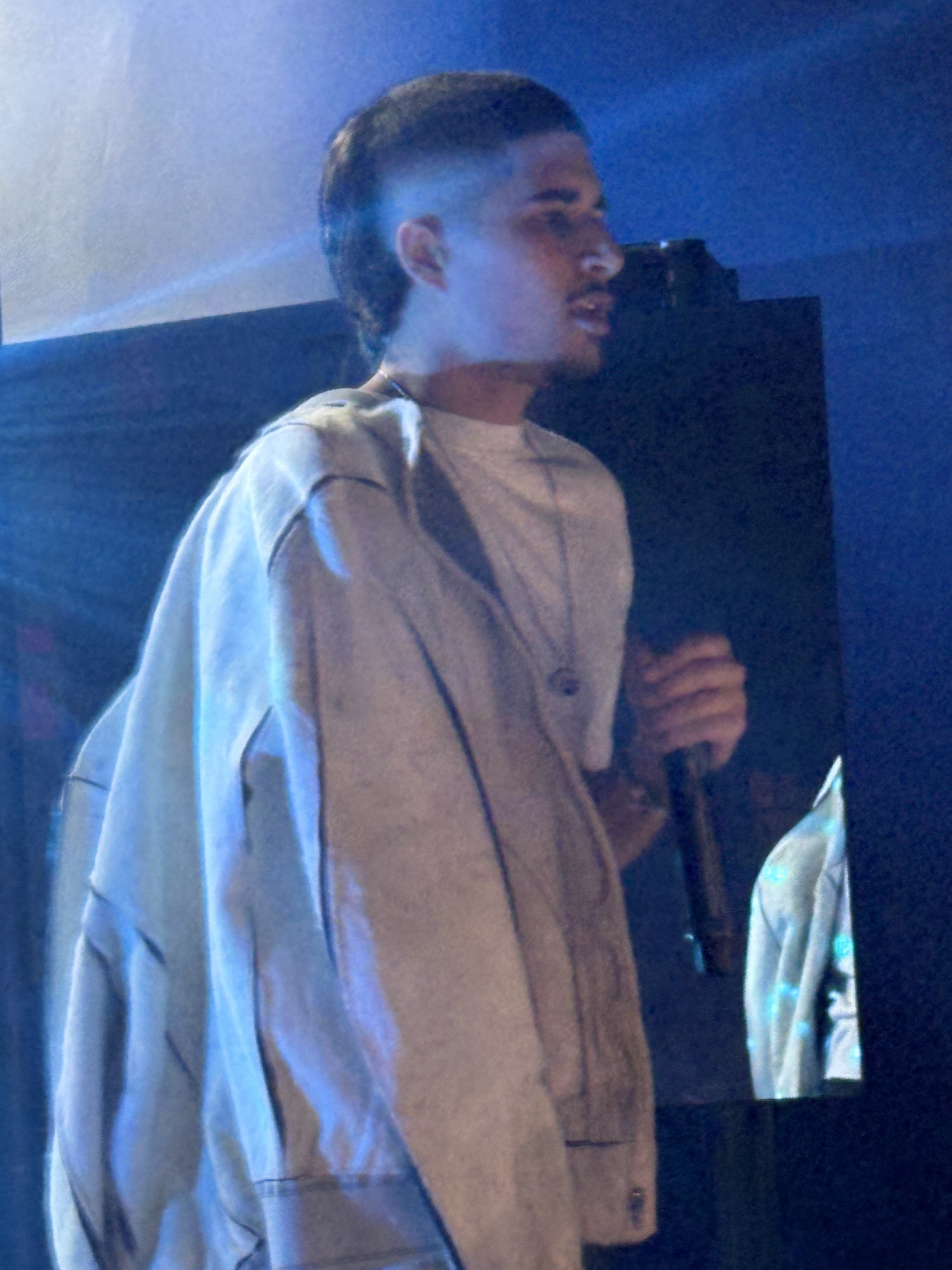
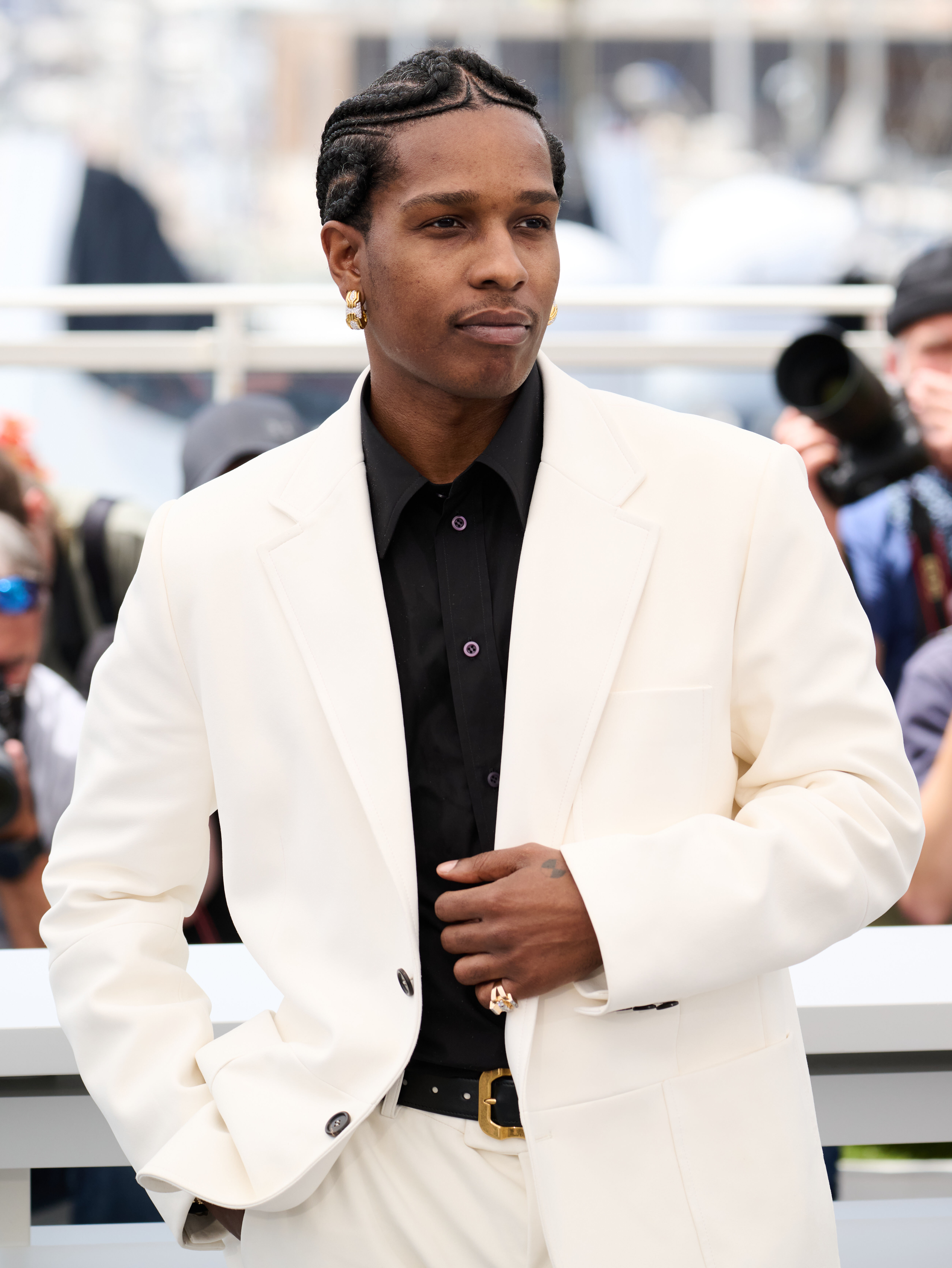
During the performance at the Crypto.com Arena, Carti brought out Fakemink (left) and A$AP Rocky (right).

Lamar included the song for his set list during his concerts of the co-headlining Grand National Tour (2025) with SZA, he brought out Playboi Carti to perform "Good Credit" together during the concert at the Mercedes-Benz Stadium in Atlanta, Georgia, on 29 April 2025.

On October 14 2025, Carti and Lamar performed the song during the Los Angeles, California concert at the Crypto.com Arena of Carti's Antagonist Tour (2025), as well as bringing out ASAP Rocky and Fakemink.

== Personnel ==
Credits and personnel adapted from Tidal.

Musicians

- Jordan Carter – vocals
- Kendrick Lamar – vocals
- Ronald LaTour Jr. – production

Technical

- Glenn Schick – mastering
- Jonathan Turner – mixing
- Marcus Fritz – mixing, recording
- Ray Charles Brown Jr. – recording

== Charts ==
=== Weekly charts ===
Weekly chart performance for "Good Credit"
| Chart (2025) | Peak position |
|---|---|
| Australia (ARIA) | 50 |
| Australia Hip Hop/R&B (ARIA) | 14 |
| Canada Hot 100 (Billboard) | 31 |
| Czech Republic Singles Digital (ČNS IFPI) | 50 |
| France (SNEP) | 162 |
| Global 200 (Billboard) | 20 |
| Greece International (IFPI) | 21 |
| Latvia (LaIPA) | 9 |
| Lithuania (AGATA) | 16 |
| New Zealand (Recorded Music NZ) | 31 |
| Slovakia Singles Digital (ČNS IFPI) | 28 |
| Sweden Heatseeker (Sverigetopplistan) | 4 |
| UK Streaming (OCC) | 56 |
| US Billboard Hot 100 | 17 |
| US Hot R&B/Hip-Hop Songs (Billboard) | 7 |

=== Year-end charts ===
Year-end chart performance for "Good Credit"
| Chart (2025) | Position |
|---|---|
| US Hot R&B/Hip-Hop Songs (Billboard) | 99 |
