= Music (Playboi Carti album) =

- Standard edition cover, select vinyl pressings invert the colors

Studio album by Playboi Carti
- Released: March 14, 2025
- Recorded: 2021 – March 14, 2025
- Studios: Cave-like studio (Paris); Means Street Studios (Atlanta)
- Genres: Southern hip-hop; trap
- Length: 76:57
- Labels: AWGE; Interscope
- Producers: 100Yrd; 99Hurts; Akachi; Blssd; Bnyx; Brak3; Cardo; Car!ton; Clayco; Clif Shayne; CSD Sid; Dez Wright; DJH; DJ Moon; DY Krazy; earlonthebeat; Ethan Scott; F1lthy; Jahaan Sweet; Johnny Juliano; Juke Wong; Keanu Beats; Kelvin Krash; Kanye West; KP Beatz; Louie Shades; Lucian; Lukrative; Maaly Raw; Macnificent; Malik Ninety Five; Metro Boomin; Mu Lean; Nagra; Nick Spiders; Ojivolta; Onokey; OpiumBaby; Rameshni; Ramzoid; RokontheTrack; Seven; Slowburnz; Smatt Sertified; SpaceGhostPurrp; Sonickaboom; Southside; Streo; TM88; Travis Scott; Twisco; Wheezy; Wonder; Yung Exclusive

Playboi Carti chronology
Whole Lotta Red (2020)	Music (2025)

Singles from Music
- 1. "Rather Lie" Released: March 14, 2025; 2. "Backd00r" Released: October 14, 2025

Music (also referred to as I Am Music, both stylized in all caps) is the third studio album by American rapper Playboi Carti. It was released on March 14, 2025, through AWGE and Interscope Records. A trap album, it marks a stylistic shift from the "baby voice" vocal approach of Carti's previous studio album, Whole Lotta Red (2020), toward a deeper and raspier delivery.

The standard version of Music consists of 30 tracks and features guest appearances from Travis Scott, the Weeknd, Kendrick Lamar, Jhené Aiko, Skepta, Future, Lil Uzi Vert, Ty Dolla Sign, and Young Thug, as well as hosting from DJ Swamp Izzo. Production was handled by Ojivolta, Cardo, and F1lthy, alongside Bnyx, Kanye West, Maaly Raw, Metro Boomin, Wheezy, and members of 808 Mafia, including TM88 and Southside. Carti announced the completion of the album on March 9, 2025, after an extended production period, and confirmed its release date on March 12, following promotional teasers by Spotify.

Music received generally positive reviews from music critics, who praised the production and Carti's vocal performances, though some criticized its inconsistency and runtime. It topped several charts worldwide and debuted at number one on the US Billboard 200. It earned 298,000 album-equivalent units in its first week, becoming Carti's second number-one and fastest-selling album as well as the highest-selling rap album debut of 2025. It was supported by the singles "Rather Lie", with the Weeknd and "Backd00r", featuring Lamar and Aiko. A deluxe edition of the album, titled Music – Sorry 4 da Wait, was released on March 25, 2025, featuring four additional tracks, with a further guest appearance from Travis Scott. In additional promotion, Carti embarked on the Antagonist Tour from October to December 2025, as well as supporting the Weeknd on his After Hours til Dawn Tour from May 2025 to September 2026.

== Background and recording ==
In December 2020, Playboi Carti released his second studio album, Whole Lotta Red, through AWGE and Interscope Records. Despite being divisive upon its release, it retrospectively became regarded as an influential album, with its help pushing the rage subgenre to the mainstream. It became his first album to chart number-one on the US Billboard 200 chart. On March 10, 2021, just three months after Whole Lotta Red was released, Carti hinted at a new project on Instagram. By August 23, 2021, he had revealed the album's initial title, Narcissist, and set a release date for September 13, although the date ultimately passed without the album's release. As the year progressed, Carti's plans for the album evolved. In an April 2022 interview with XXL, he mentioned that the album's title had been changed to Music. During this period, Carti was actively recording and experimenting with new sounds, seeking to build on the success of his previous work. His creative process involved working with a variety of collaborators, drawing on the talent within his Opium label, including producers like F1lthy and the collective Working on Dying. Carti was also influenced by various genres, blending elements of punk, rap, and experimental music.

You know, this album right here is – I say this for everything, but – I think it's going to be my best album because I'm just popping it. It starts with music. That's it. As long as I got that, it's up.

— Playboi Carti to Numéro Berlin in 2023

Throughout 2022 and 2023, Carti remained active in live performances, debuting unreleased tracks and building anticipation among fans. On December 25, 2022, the second anniversary of Whole Lotta Red, Carti reignited speculation by posting what appeared to be new cover art on Instagram and tweeting, "love all my supporters it's time". By 2023, Carti had solidified his vision for the album, intensifying his creative process while continuing to tweak and perfect the project. In a November 2023 interview with Numéro Berlin, Carti emphasized the personal significance of the album, describing it as his most important work to date. He revealed that much of the album was recorded in a cave-like studio in Paris, where he spent three months immersed in the creative process, as well as recording at DJ Drama's Means Street Studios in Atlanta. On November 17, 2024, Carti revealed production from Ye for the album. On March 9, 2025, Carti revealed that the album was finished. A few days later, on March 12, he officially announced that the album would be released on March 14, 2025, after a string of teasers from Spotify. According to DJ Swamp Izzo, who hosted the album, recording continued until the night of release, with final adjustments being made only hours before it became available.

== Composition ==
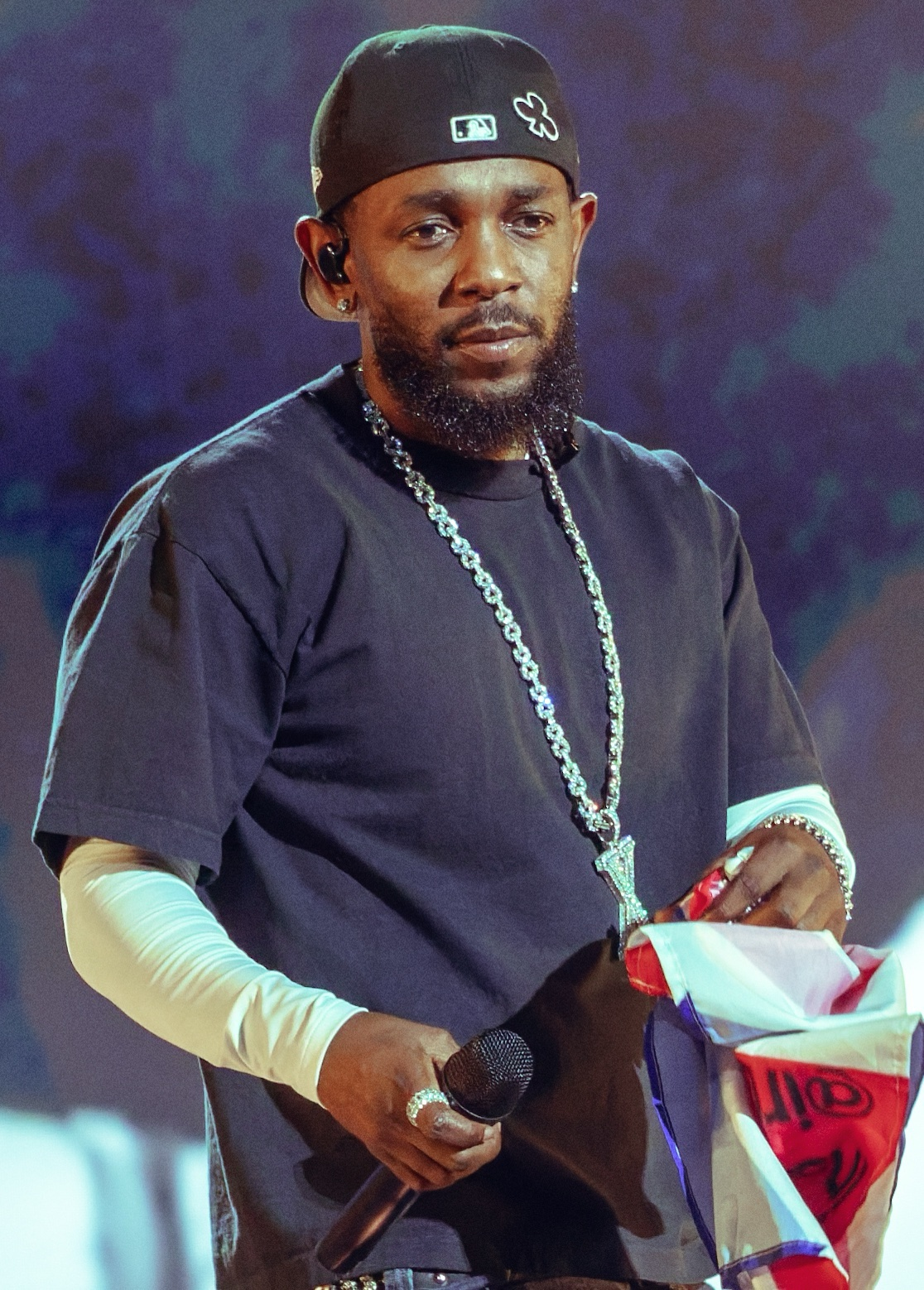
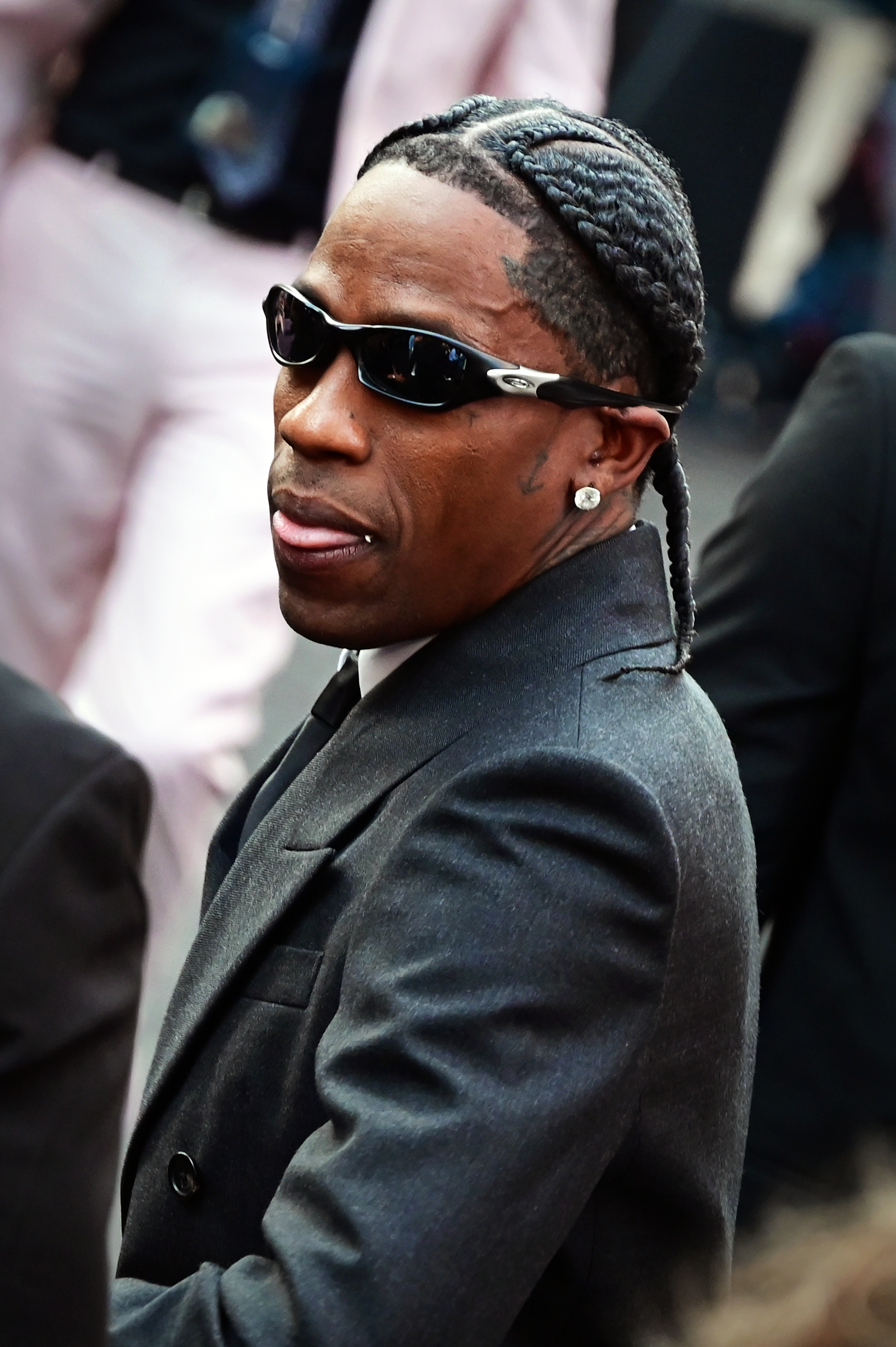
Kendrick Lamar (left) and Travis Scott appeared on multiple tracks on the album, with 3 and 5, respectively.

Music is a Southern hip-hop and trap album. It departs from the "baby voice" vocal approach used on Whole Lotta Red (2020), instead featuring a deeper and rougher vocal delivery. Production was handled by Cardo, Ojivolta, F1lthy, Metro Boomin, Wheezy, and others, and incorporates 808 drums, hi-hats, and synthesizers. Critics highlighted elements including a Hungarian psychedelic sample and chipmunk soul influences. Reviewers identified stylistic variety among the tracks, with "Pop Out" and "Crush" described as energetic compositions, while "Rather Lie" and "Backd00r" were characterized as more melodic.

"Cocaine Nose"
The twentieth track on the album, it features a prominent sample of the guitar riff from Ashanti's song "Only U".

Carti's vocal delivery changes across the album, with a low register on "Mojo Jojo", a high-pitched timbre on "I Seeeeee You Baby Boi", and a freestyle-based approach on "HBA". Critics commented that the lyrical content focuses more on rhythm and repetition than narrative, often using short phrases and refrains. The album's sequencing includes abrupt transitions between certain tracks, such as from "Cocaine Nose" into "We Need All Da Vibes". Tracks like "Twin Trim" and "Munyun" are shorter, more minimal compositions that serve as interludes or stylistic diversions within the overall tracklist. Guest artists include Kendrick Lamar, Future, Jhené Aiko, Travis Scott, the Weeknd, Ty Dolla Sign, Young Thug, Lil Uzi Vert, and Skepta.

Lyrical themes observed by critics include materialism, nightlife, and personal reflection. Examples include autobiographical lines in "Munyun" and "South Atlanta Baby", contrasted with more boastful content in other tracks. Hosting from DJ Swamp Izzo were compared by reviewers to traditional Atlanta mixtape formats. Following the release of the album, "Rather Lie" and "Fine Shit" became the subject of online theories claiming the songs were not actually performed by Carti himself, but rather used artificial intelligence-generated audio deepfakes of Carti's voice. Carti previously faced similar deepfake accusations for his 2024 song "Timeless" with the Weeknd. Jon Powell of Revolt described the controversy as "a case study in how AI is already reshaping the listener's perception of what's genuine." Hip-hop personality DJ Akademiks reported that Carti privately denied these accusations.

== Promotion and release ==
Promotion for Music began on December 7, 2023, when Carti posted a cryptic Instagram story reading "I am music", followed by a message from Pharrell Williams stating "Prepare". Later that day, DJ Akademiks reported that the album was expected to be released in January 2024. On December 8, 2023, Carti released the track "Different Day" through the Opium Instagram account, accompanied by a full-length music video. In the following weeks, Carti released a series of singles: "2024" on December 14, "H00dByAir" on December 19, "Backr00ms" featuring Travis Scott on January 1, 2024, "EvilJ0rdan" on January 15, and "Ketamine" on March 12. "H00dByAir", "EvilJ0rdan", and "Ketamine" were later included on the album under different titles. Each release was accompanied by a music video, most of which were exclusive to Instagram or YouTube.

Throughout 2024, Carti previewed unreleased songs during live performances, including "All Red" and "FOMDJ" at the Lyrical Lemonade Summer Smash festival in June. Carti and affiliated sources, including DJ Akademiks and members of Opium, frequently used the phrase "2024 Music" on social media, suggesting a release within that year. On June 17, Carti previewed another unreleased track on Instagram. On September 12, 2024, the day before his birthday, he announced new merchandise that revealed the album's title and hinted at a release date. Later that day, he posted a teaser for the single "All Red" with the caption "Tonight? All Red??", which was released at midnight on streaming platforms. On November 22, 2024, he shared the track "Play This" through the Opium Instagram account. On November 27, 2024, he announced he would perform Music at Rolling Loud Miami on December 15, 2024. At the festival, Carti performed five new songs. Additionally, he would officially be announced as a supporting act for the Weeknd's After Hours til Dawn Tour on January 31, 2025.

In late February and early March 2025, promotional billboards in collaboration with Spotify appeared in locations including Downtown Los Angeles, Times Square, and Bayfront Park in Miami. These featured the album's signature font and messages such as "MUSIC IS COMING" (February 17), "I AM MUSIC MF" (February 18), "TRIM" (February 19), "IMSOYVL" (February 20), "SORRY 4 DA WAIT" (February 21), "BABYBOI" (February 22), "OVERLY TRIM" (February 25), and "STREETS READY" and "I AM MUSIC" (March 12). Spotify also released a teaser video captioned "Have faith" on social media. Shortly after, Carti removed all posts from his Instagram account and shared an image of a Times Square billboard on the Opium account, followed by a post reading "IMA DOG N YAL KNO DAT #IAMMUSIC" and responses to comments from Spotify and American Twitch streamer Kai Cenat. Later the same day, he tweeted "Friday", confirming the release date of March 14, 2025. Carti subsequently posted an Instagram video featuring English experimental musician Blackhaine announcing the release date. The album was initially set to release at midnight, Eastern Standard Time (EST); however, it was then delayed three hours to 3:00 a.m. EST, or midnight, Pacific Standard Time, which Carti alerted to Akademiks and Cenat; the latter was informed that this was due to sample clearance issues. The album officially released on streaming services at around 7:30 a.m. EST.

A music video for "Opm Babi" was released through Instagram on March 16, 2025. The following day, the music video for "Evil J0rdan" was uploaded to Carti's YouTube channel. On March 25, 2025, the deluxe edition, Music – Sorry 4 da Wait, was released alongside a music video for "FOMDJ". On April 8, a video for "Fine Shit" was released on YouTube. Carti would announce the United States-only Antagonist Tour on August 25; it spanned from October to December 2025, with Opium collaborators Ken Carson, Destroy Lonely, Homixide Gang and ApolloRed1 as supporting acts.

== Title ==
Prior to its release, Music was associated with several potential titles. Early in its development, Carti hinted at the name Narcissist in a social media post that included a screenshot from an iMessage group chat with the caption, "Forget about sample clearances. Drop Narcissist". Fans also speculated that the album might be titled Antagonist, a name linked to a cancelled world tour that was scheduled to feature Opium labelmates Ken Carson, Destroy Lonely, and Homixide Gang.

In an April 2022 interview with XXL, Carti disclosed the eventual title Music, stating, "that's all it is at this point". From December 2023, he began referring to the project as I Am Music in promotional materials and online posts. On September 12, 2024, Carti officially announced I Am Music during the launch of box-set pre-orders, which included digital pre-orders and nine CD designs, three of which were available exclusively in merchandise bundles. Despite the cover retaining its tentative title, "I Am Music", the album was officially released as simply Music.

== Critical reception ==
Professional ratings
Aggregate scores
Source	Rating
AnyDecentMusic?	6.8/10
Metacritic	73/100
Review scores
Source	Rating
AllMusic	3.5/5 stars
The Guardian	4/5 stars
MusicOMH	3/5 stars
NME	4/5 stars
Pitchfork	7.7/10
Rolling Stone	4/5 stars
Slant Magazine	3.5/5 stars
Sputnikmusic	2.3/5

According to the review aggregator Metacritic, Music received "generally favorable reviews" based on a weighted average score of 73 out of 100 from ten critic scores. The review aggregator AnyDecentMusic? gave the album a weighted average score of 6.8 out of 10 from eight critic scores.

Kyann-Sian Williams of NME described the album as "not just an expansion of Carti's sonic world, but a refinement that spins his characteristic chaos into something cinematic". Ben Beaumont-Thomas of The Guardian believed that it showcased his "almost mystical level of vocal range", dubbing the record "jaded" and "narcotized". Dakota West Foss of Sputnikmusic offered a more mixed perspective, calling the album "too much" and citing its messy and "out of control" nature as its weakness.

Alphonse Pierre of Pitchfork characterized Music as "the synthesis of all of Carti's impulses both good and bad"—a work he deemed "flawed, contradictory, inflated, loud, exciting, mainstream-ified, uncomfortable, [and] nostalgic". He praised the range of Carti's vocal performances, likening his ability to shift styles to "the rap game Dana Carvey", and highlighted tracks such as "Like Weezy" and "Opm Babi" for their chaotic inventiveness. However, Pierre criticized the album's overlong runtime, uneven quality control, and overreliance on guest features, many of which he considered uninspired. Mosi Reeves of Rolling Stone praised Carti as "a wholly unique pop star" and an "era-defining talent", highlighting his dramatic tonal shifts between songs and the album's eclectic production palette. Reeves pointed to moments such as the atmospheric introduction to "Evil J0rdan" and the genre-blending of "Like Weezy" and "Cocaine Nose" as evidence of Carti's creativity. He also noted recurring lyrical themes involving male power dynamics, with occasional glimpses of personal reflection, such as on "Rather Lie" and "South Atlanta Baby".

Charles Lyons-Burt of Slant Magazine described the album as "thrillingly all-encompassing", praising Carti's "staggering range" and inventive vocal approaches. He highlighted moments of humor and eccentricity, such as the choir-backed "Crush" and Kendrick Lamar's ad-lib-heavy interplay on "Mojo Jojo", but criticized certain stretches as unfocused or self-indulgent. Fred Thomas of AllMusic wrote that Music "never feels quite cohesive enough to register as an album" due to its "bloated, style-hopping track list" and 76-minute runtime, though he found its eclecticism consistent with Carti's brand of "blissful confusion". He concluded that the album is "a cyclone of weird turns, big ideas, and choices that don't really make sense together, but are still somehow enjoyable".

Music was chosen as the 10th best album of 2025 by Rolling Stone.

== Commercial performance ==
Music broke multiple streaming and chart records upon release. On Spotify, it earned 134 million streams in its first day, becoming the seventh-most streamed album in a single day. In the United States, Music debuted atop the Billboard 200 with 298,000 album-equivalent units, including 14,500 pure album sales, becoming Carti's second number-one and fastest-selling album as well as the highest-selling rap album debut of 2025, totaling 384 million streams and allowing the album to concurrently debut atop the Top Streaming Albums chart. The project marked the biggest streaming week for any album since Taylor Swift's The Tortured Poets Department accumulated 428.54 million streams in May 2024. All 30 songs simultaneously debuted on the Billboard Hot 100, making him the first rapper to achieve this milestone. (Note: Other rap albums have had all songs chart, however, Carti is the first to chart 30 songs.) During its second week, Music held the number one spot on the Billboard 200 with 131,000 album-equivalent units, including 7,000 pure album sales and 171.02 million streams. After falling to the number two spot behind Ariana Grande's Eternal Sunshine Deluxe: Brighter Days Ahead, Music would rise to the number one spot for its third week with 64,000 album-equivalent units, including 2,500 pure album sales and 84.6 million streams.

In the United Kingdom, Music debuted at number one on the Official Albums Chart, marking Carti's first number one and first top ten on the chart. Music also debuted atop the ARIA Album Chart in Australia and the Top 40 Albums Chart in New Zealand, marking his first number one album on both charts, as well as his first top ten in Australia.

== Track listing ==
Credits adapted from Tidal, ASCAP, and BMI.

Music track listing
No.	Title	Writer(s)	Producer(s)	Length
1.	"Pop Out"	Jordan Carter; Dwan Avery; Philip Mueller; Nicholas Santos	DY Krazy; DJH; Slowburnz	2:41
2.	"Crush" (with Travis Scott)	J. Carter; Jacques Webster; Mark Williams; Raul Cubina; Richard Ortiz; Jahaan Sweet	Travis Scott; Ojivolta; F1lthy; Sweet	2:53
3.	"K Pop"	J. Carter; M. Williams; Cubina; Ronald LaTour Jr.; Jarrod Morgan	Ojivolta; Cardo; Twisco	1:52
4.	"Evil J0rdan"	J. Carter; M. Williams; Cubina; LaTour; John Julian; Abel Tesfaye^{[a]}; Leland Wayne^{[a]}; Mike Dean^{[a]}; Tom Mikailin^{[a]}; Sam Levinson^{[a]}; Michael Walker^{[a]}; John Flippin^{[a]}	Ojivolta; Cardo; Johnny Juliano	3:03
5.	"Mojo Jojo"	J. Carter; Kendrick Duckworth; LaTour; Julian	Cardo; Johnny Juliano	2:36
6.	"Philly" (with Travis Scott)	J. Carter; Webster; LaTour; Julian	Cardo; Johnny Juliano	3:05
7.	"Radar"	J. Carter; Wayne	Metro Boomin	1:47
8.	"Rather Lie" (with the Weeknd)	J. Carter; Tesfaye; M. Williams; Cubina; Ortiz; Morgan; Julien Lopes; Kobe Hood; Deavon Petty-Chisolm	Ojivolta; F1lthy; Twisco; Ramzoid	3:29
9.	"Fine Shit"	J. Carter; M. Williams; Cubina; Ortiz; Keanu Torres; Kelvin Tang; Hood	Ojivolta; F1lthy; Keanu Beats; 99Hurts	1:46
10.	"Backd00r" (featuring Kendrick Lamar and Jhené Aiko)	J. Carter; Duckworth; M. Williams; Cubina; Torres; Morgan; Jugraj Nagra; Darius Rameshni; Antony Olabode^{[b]}; Beverley Knight^{[b]}; Victor Redwood-Sawyerr^{[b]}	Ojivolta; Kanye West; Keanu Beats; Nagra; Rameshni; Twisco	3:10
11.	"Toxic" (with Skepta)	J. Carter; Joseph Adenuga; LaTour; Ciaran Mullan; Dylan Cleary-Krell	Cardo; Mu Lean; Dez Wright	2:15
12.	"Munyun"	J. Carter; M. Williams; Cubina; Ortiz; Torres; Mueller; Bruce Carter^{[c]}; Edward Boze^{[c]}; Robert Drayton^{[c]}	Ojivolta; F1lthy; Keanu Beats; DJH	2:34
13.	"Crank"	J. Carter; LaTour; Julian; Daveon Jackson; Markese Rolle^{[d]}	Cardo; Johnny Juliano; Yung Exclusive	2:27
14.	"Charge Dem Hoes a Fee" (with Future and Travis Scott)	J. Carter; Nayvadius Wilburn; Webster; Cleary-Krell; Matthew Kyle-Brown; Joshua Luellen; Wesley Glass	Wheezy; Southside; Dez Wright; Smatt Sertified; Car!ton; Juke Wong	3:45
15.	"Good Credit" (with Kendrick Lamar)	J. Carter; Duckworth; LaTour	Cardo	3:10
16.	"I Seeeeee You Baby Boi"	J. Carter; Corey Moon; Kenneth Pannu; Stefan Cişmigliu	DJ Moon; KP Beatz; Lucian	2:38
17.	"Wake Up F1lthy" (with Travis Scott)	J. Carter; Webster; Ortiz; Benjamin Saint Fort; Wonder	F1lthy; Bnyx; Wonder	2:49
18.	"Jumpin" (with Lil Uzi Vert)	J. Carter; Symere Woods; Tariq Sharrieff; Ethan Scott	Blssd; E. Scott	1:32
19.	"Trim" (with Future)	J. Carter; Wilburn; Bryan Simmons; Sidney Tapaquon; Kenneth Smith; Hunter Brown; Benjamin Shields	TM88; CSD Sid; Macnificent; Akachi; Sonickaboom	3:13
20.	"Cocaine Nose"	J. Carter; Ortiz; Kyle Brooks; Sanriago Kytnar; Ashanti Douglas^{[e]}; Irving Lorenzo^{[e]}; Denzil Foster^{[e]}; Jay King^{[e]}; Thomas McElroy^{[e]}; Marcus Vest^{[e]}	F1lthy; Brak3; 100yrd; Seven^{[e]}	2:31
21.	"We Need All Da Vibes" (with Young Thug and Ty Dolla Sign)	J. Carter; Jeffery Williams; Tyrone Griffin Jr.; Glass; Cleary-Krell	Wheezy; Dez Wright	3:01
22.	"Olympian"	J. Carter; Moon; Clifton Shayne; Nick Spiders	DJ Moon; Clif Shayne; Spiders	2:54
23.	"Opm Babi"	J. Carter; Jaylan Tucker; Corey Kerr; Keian Bohn	OpiumBaby; Clayco; Streo	2:53
24.	"Twin Trim" (with Lil Uzi Vert)	Woods; Pannu; Rok Curkovic	KP Beatz; RokontheTrack	1:34
25.	"Like Weezy"	J. Carter; M. Williams; Cubina; Kelvin Magnussen; Kaelub Denson^{[f]}; Kevin Denson^{[f]}; Kazarion Fowler^{[f]}; Willie Byrd^{[f]}	Ojivolta; Kelvin Krash	1:55
26.	"Dis 1 Got It"	J. Carter; Ortiz; Pierre Thevenot; Malik Sanders; Louis Ciarocchi	F1lthy; Lukrative; Malik Ninety Five; Louie Shades	2:03
27.	"Walk"	J. Carter; M. Williams; Cubina; Mueller; Sharrieff; Dwayne Richardson^{[g]}; Trentavious White^{[g]}	Ojivolta; DJH; Blssd	1:34
28.	"HBA"	J. Carter; LaTour; Carlos Pfersdorf	Cardo; Onokey	3:32
29.	"Overly"	J. Carter; Jamaal Henry	Maaly Raw	1:45
30.	"South Atlanta Baby"	J. Carter; M. Williams; Cubina; Mueller; Ortiz	Ojivolta; F1lthy; DJH	2:13
Total length:				76:57

Music – Sorry 4 da Wait additional track listing
No.	Title	Writer(s)	Producer(s)	Length
31.	"Different Day"	J. Carter; Pannu; Mathias Liyew; Niklas Köllner	KP Beatz; Ambezza; Nikki3k	2:46
32.	"2024"	J. Carter; M. Williams; Cubina; Isaac Bynum; West; Yeo Choong^{[h]}	Ojivolta; Earl on the Beat; West	3:29
33.	"Backr00ms" (with Travis Scott)	J. Carter; Webster; M. Williams; Cubina; LaTour	Ojivolta; Cardo; Duce	2:40
34.	"FOMDJ"	J. Carter; M. Williams; Cubina; Ortiz; Thevenot; Cismigliu	Ojivolta; F1lthy; Lukrative; Lucian	3:20
Total length:				89:12

Notes

- All songs are stylized in uppercase; for example, "Pop Out" is written as "POP OUT".
- "K Pop" was originally released as "Ketamine".
- "HBA" was originally released as "H00dByAir".
- "FOMDJ" is an acronym for "Fuck on My DJ".

Sample and interpolation credits

- ^{^[a]}"Evil J0rdan" contains a sample of "Popular", written by Abel Tesfaye, Jordan Carter, Leland Wayne, Mike Dean, Tom Mikailin, Sam Levinson, Michael Walker, and John Flippin, and performed by the Weeknd, Playboi Carti, and Madonna.
- ^{^[b]}"Backd00r" contains a sample of "Mutual Feeling", written by Beverley Knight, Antony Olabode and Victor Redwood-Sawyerr, and performed by Knight.
- ^{^[c]}"Munyun" contains a sample of "Lay Your Head on My Shoulder", written by Bruce Carter, Edward Boze and Robert Drayton, and performed by Bill Robinson and the Quails.
- ^{^[d]}"Crank" contains a sample of "Fuck Taylor Gang (Not a Diss We Are Just Not Dickriders)", written and performed by SpaceGhostPurrp.
- ^{^[e]}"Cocaine Nose" contains a sample of "Only U", written by Ashanti Douglas, Irving Lorenzo and Marcus Vest, and performed by Ashanti, which itself contains a sample of "Why You Treat Me So Bad", written by Denzil Foster, Jay King and Thomas McElroy, and performed by Club Nouveau.
- ^{^[f]}"Like Weezy" contains a sample of "Bend Over", written by Kaelub Denson, Kevin Denson, Kazarion Fowler and Willie Byrd, and performed by Rich Kidz.
- ^{^[g]}"Walk" contains a sample of "Sydney", written by Trentavious White and Dwayne Richardson, and performed by Bankroll Fresh.
- ^{^[h]}"2024" contains a sample of "Jacob's Ladder", written and performed by Yeo.

== Personnel ==
Credits adapted from Tidal.

- Marcus Fritz – mixer (all tracks), recording engineer (1–15, 17–21, 23, 24, 26–30)
- Johnathan Turner – mixer (5, 10, 15)
- Mike Dean – mixer (8)
- Rafael Fai Bautista – mixer (21), recording engineer (21)
- Ojivolta – mastering engineer (1, 3, 4, 6, 9, 11, 13, 16–19, 23, 24, 26–30), recording engineer (9)
- Glenn Schick – mastering engineer (all tracks)
- Ray Charles Brown Jr. – recording engineer (10, 15)
- Roark Bailey – recording engineer (17, 21)
- DJ Moon – recording engineer (16, 22)

== Charts ==
=== Weekly charts ===
Weekly chart performance for Music
Chart (2025–2026)	Peak position
Australian Albums (ARIA)	1
Australian Hip Hop/R&B Albums (ARIA)	1
Austrian Albums (Ö3 Austria)	1
Belgian Albums (Ultratop Flanders)	3
Belgian Albums (Ultratop Wallonia)	5
Canadian Albums (Billboard)	1
Czech Albums (ČNS IFPI)	1
Danish Albums (Hitlisten)	1
Dutch Albums (Album Top 100)	2
Finnish Albums (Suomen virallinen lista)	5
French Albums (SNEP)	4
German Albums (Offizielle Top 100)	3
Hungarian Albums (MAHASZ)	1
Icelandic Albums (Tónlistinn)	1
Irish Albums (Official Charts)	2
Italian Albums (FIMI)	3
Japanese Combined Albums (Oricon)	37
Japanese Hot Albums (Billboard Japan)	17
Lithuanian Albums (AGATA)	1
New Zealand Albums (RMNZ)	1
Nigerian Albums (TurnTable)	4
Norwegian Albums (VG-lista)	1
Polish Albums (ZPAV)	2
Portuguese Albums (AFP)	1
Scottish Albums (Official Charts)	72
Slovak Albums (ČNS IFPI)	1
Spanish Albums (PROMUSICAE)	5
Swedish Albums (Sverigetopplistan)	2
Swiss Albums (Schweizer Hitparade)	1
UK Albums (Official Charts)	1
UK R&B Albums (Official Charts)	4
US Billboard 200	1
US Top R&B/Hip-Hop Albums (Billboard)	1

Chart performance for Music – Sorry 4 da Wait
Chart (2025)	Peak position
Lithuanian Albums (AGATA)	87
Norwegian Albums (VG-lista)	55

=== Year-end charts ===
Year-end chart performance for Music
Chart (2025)	Position
Australian Albums (ARIA)	82
Austrian Albums (Ö3 Austria)	55
Belgian Albums (Ultratop Flanders)	108
Belgian Albums (Ultratop Wallonia)	196
Canadian Albums (Billboard)	43
Dutch Albums (Album Top 100)	89
French Albums (SNEP)	121
Hungarian Albums (MAHASZ)	27
New Zealand Albums (RMNZ)	36
Swiss Albums (Schweizer Hitparade)	13
US Billboard 200	19
US Top R&B/Hip-Hop Albums (Billboard)	6

== Certifications ==
Certifications for Music, with pure sales where available
Region	Certification	Certified units/sales
Italy (FIMI)	Gold	25,000^{‡}
Poland (ZPAV)	Gold	15,000^{‡}
United Kingdom (BPI)	Gold	100,000^{‡}
United States (RIAA)	Platinum	1,349,662
^{‡} Sales+streaming figures based on certification alone.

== Release history ==
Release history for Music
Region	Date	Label(s)	Format(s)	Edition	Ref.
Various	March 14, 2025	AWGE; Interscope	Digital download; streaming	Standard	
Various	May 23, 2025	AWGE; Interscope	CD	Standard	
Various	June 27, 2025	AWGE; Interscope	2LP	Standard	

== See also ==
- List of Billboard 200 number-one albums of 2025
- 2025 in hip-hop
