= Crush (Playboi Carti and Travis Scott song) =

Song by Playboi Carti and Travis Scott

from the album Music
- Released: March 14, 2025
- Length: 2:53
- Label: AWGE; Interscope
- Songwriters: Jordan Carter; Jacques Webster; Mark Williams; Raul Cubina; Richard Ortiz; Jahaan Sweet
- Producers: F1lthy; Ojivolta; Travis Scott; Jahaan Sweet

Visual and audio videos
- "Crush" (Music Video) on YouTube "Crush" (Audio) on YouTube

"Crush" (stylized in all caps) is a song by American rappers Playboi Carti and Travis Scott. It was released through AWGE and Interscope Records as the second track from Carti's third studio album, Music, on March 14, 2025. The song was written by Playboi Carti and Travis Scott, alongside producers F1lthy, Ojivolta and Jahaan Sweet. Exactly one year after the album's release, on March 14, 2026, a surprise music video for the song was premiered.

== Critical reception ==
In a ranking of all features on the album, Billboard's Mackenzie Cummings-Grady placed "Crush" tenth and opined that the song feels more like a solo Carti song with Scott only providing adlibs, while saying that the song does not go in any proper direction. Cummings-Grady predicted the song to be another hit for the both of them although its "amalgamation of sounds feels like the beginning of an exciting new chapter for King Vamp [Carti]". Angel Diaz and Michael Saponara later also ranked the song tenth of the overall album, opining that the song "feels like sitting in a church pew as they spread the Good Word over F1lthy and Ojivolta's beat that sounds like it's from a far away galaxy". Vivian Medithi felt that Scott had the best feature on Music because of "Crush", describing that "F1LTHY and Ojivolta craft an instrumental that sounds like a gospel choir with blue balls having a paroxysm in the middle of a rave" and "it's extravagant and ridiculous and beyond melodramatic, but the synthesis doesn't just work—it floats". In a premature evaluation for Stereogum, Tom Breihan opined that the "bloopy" keyboard "could've come from an '80s Nintendo-game soundtrack".

== Music video ==
On March 14, 2026, a surprise music video for "Crush" was released, coinciding with the one-year anniversary of Music. The video was directed by Frankie and was initially premiered on Carti's alternative Instagram account, @Opium_00pium, before being uploaded to YouTube by the multimedia collective and concert promotion group Vercetti Way.

The music video features guest appearances from Travis Scott, members of the Opium collective, and Carti's former girlfriend, Giovanna Ramos. Visually, the video contains footage of Carti in a nightclub environment, performing live during a concert at the MetLife Stadium, and in a room surrounded by memorabilia from the Music album. The editing style utilizes heavy rotoscoping and frequent stuttering.

== Personnel ==
Credits and personnel adapted from Tidal.

Musicians

- Jordan Carter – vocals
- Jacques Webster – vocals, production
- Richard Oritz – production
- Mark Williams – production
- Raul Cubina – production
- Jahaan Sweet – production

Technical

- Glenn Schick – mastering
- Marcus Fritz – mixing, recording

== Charts ==
Chart performance for "Crush"
Chart (2025)	Peak position
Australia (ARIA)	29
Australia Hip Hop/R&B (ARIA)	8
Austria (Ö3 Austria Top 40)	16
Canada Hot 100 (Billboard)	26
Czech Republic Singles Digital (ČNS IFPI)	13
France (SNEP)	83
Global 200 (Billboard)	17
Greece International (IFPI)	16
Hungary (Single Top 40)	37
Ireland (IRMA)	35
Italy (FIMI)	85
Latvia (LaIPA)	3
Lithuania (AGATA)	8
Luxembourg (Billboard)	19
Netherlands (Single Top 100)	66
New Zealand (Recorded Music NZ)	19
Romania (Billboard)	21
Slovakia Singles Digital (ČNS IFPI)	8
Sweden Heatseeker (Sverigetopplistan)	1
Switzerland (Schweizer Hitparade)	15
UK Hip Hop/R&B (OCC)	8
UK Streaming (OCC)	40
US Billboard Hot 100	20
US Hot R&B/Hip-Hop Songs (Billboard)	8
