= All Red =

2024 single by Playboi Carti

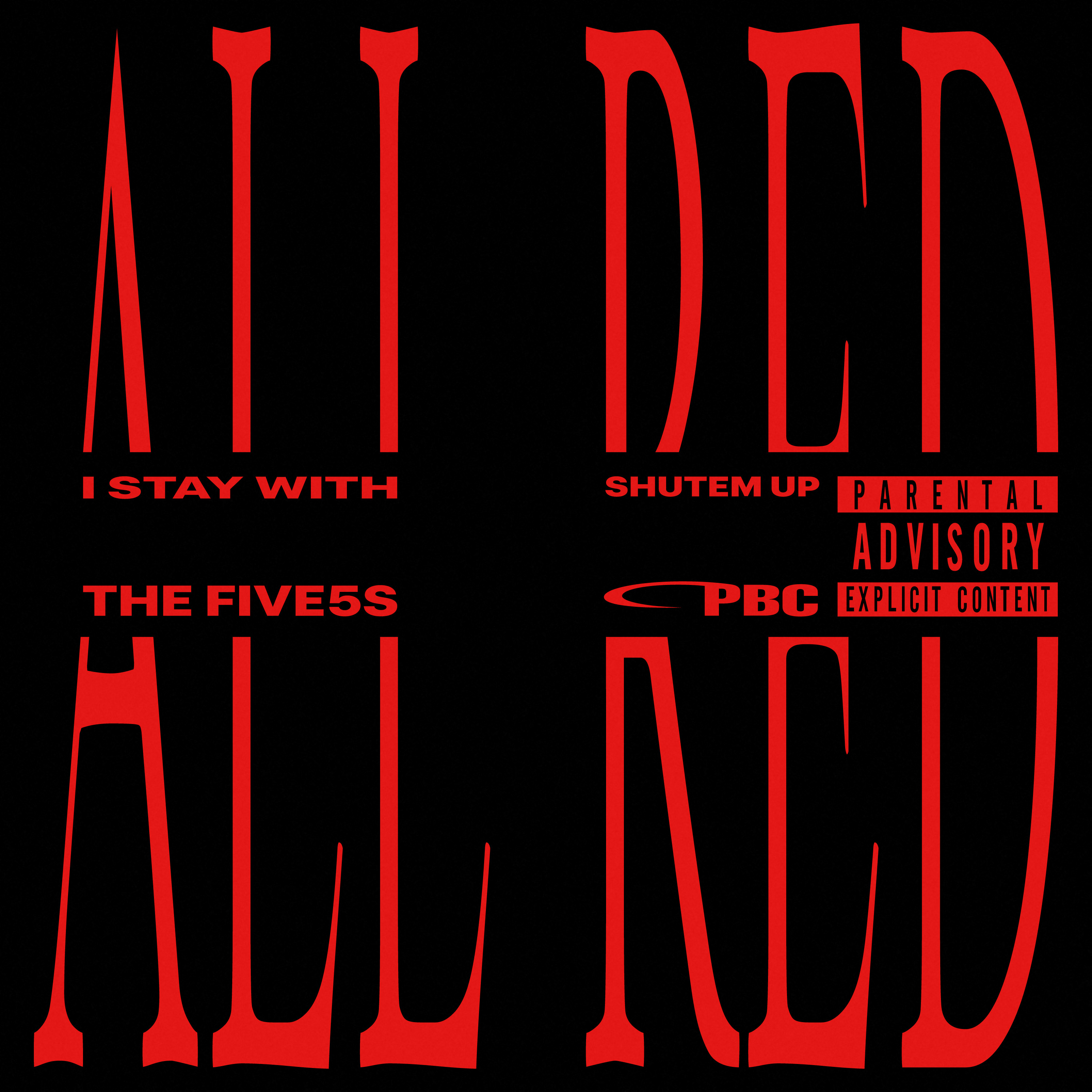

Single by Playboi Carti
- Released: September 13, 2024
- Recorded: c. 2022
- Genre: Trap; rage
- Length: 2:28
- Label: AWGE; Interscope
- Songwriters: Jordan Carter; Richard Ortiz; Mark Williams; Ștefan Cișmigiu; Pierre Thevenot; Jarrod Morgan
- Producers: F1lthy; Ojivolta; Lucian; Lukrative; Twisco

Playboi Carti singles chronology
"I Luv It" (2024)	"All Red" (2024)	"Timeless" (2024)

Visualizer
- "All Red" on YouTube

"All Red" (stylized in all caps) is a song by American rapper Playboi Carti, released on September 13, 2024, by AWGE and Interscope Records. It was written by Playboi Carti alongside producers F1lthy, Ojivolta, Lucian, Lukrative, and Twisco. The song originally surfaced in 2023 when portions of it were leaked online, becoming highly coveted among Playboi Carti's fan community. "All Red" is a rage song which sees Playboi Carti use a notably deeper delivery compared to his signature "baby voice".

Playboi Carti premiered "All Red" at a live show in June 2024 and released it on his birthday months later. His first official solo release since 2020, it was initially intended to be the lead single for his studio album Music but was excluded from its final track listing. Many listeners noted similarities in Playboi Carti's vocal performance to that of the rapper Future, producing mixed feedback. Regardless, critics were generally positive of "All Red" and highlighted the vocals as a standout. It debuted at number 15 on the Billboard Hot 100 and number three on Hot R&B/Hip-Hop Songs, his first top 10 solo release on the latter. A visualizer for "All Red" was released depicting Playboi Carti and his entourage in New York City.

== Background ==
"All Red" is rumored to have been recorded by Playboi Carti sometime in 2022 as he toured for his previous album Whole Lotta Red, released on December 25, 2020. A second-hand recording of the song was leaked on April 5, 2023, followed by a video snippet of Playboi Carti and Working on Dying producer F1lthy dancing to a slightly longer snippet surfacing online on May 10. The song, which was not officially titled or previewed at the time, was given the nickname "All Red" by Playboi Carti's fanbase, and generated interest due to the unique vocal delivery compared to his prior works. Since then, it was regarded as one of the fanbases' most sought after unreleased songs in Playboi Carti's catalog.

== Composition ==
"All Red" is two minutes and 28 seconds long. It has been labeled a "nightmarish trap tune" of the rage microgenre. The production, described as "spooky" as well as "hypnotic" and "high-energy", consists of a driving drum pattern with synths and guitar riffs. Lyrically, the song primarily consists of braggadocio delivered through a "more menacing rap flow". Compared to the higher-pitched "baby voice" he had become synonymous with and used on his previous album, Playboi Carti's vocal delivery is pitch-shifted for a deeper vocal register, a voice which he had been experimenting with in previous songs and features. Fans noted the artificial deepening of his vocal register differed from other songs in which his natural delivery was deeper.

== Release and promotion ==
Amidst a spate of unofficial song releases throughout the year preceding the rollout for his then-upcoming studio album Music, Playboi Carti first performed the full version of "All Red" on June 15, 2024, during his performance at Lyrical Lemonade's Summer Smash music festival in Chicago. He continued teasing "All Red" throughout social media, posting a photo of himself aboard a private jet on Instagram, with "All Red" printed and written onto his hat.

On September 12, Playboi Carti's social media accounts uploaded a post of Blackhaine declaring an announcement for later that night. Digital copies of Music bundled with "All Red"-themed merchandise soon became available for pre-order on Playboi Carti's official website. Such merchandise consisted of three box sets; one contained a model of the stylized cap he posted on Instagram, while the others included a long-sleeved t-shirt and a hoodie. Later on, a post on his alternative Instagram account teased the release of "All Red" that night.

Coinciding with his twenty-ninth birthday, "All Red" was released on September 13 through the labels AWGE and Interscope Records, first on YouTube and then on streaming platforms. It was his first official solo material released since Whole Lotta Red and his first solo single since "@ Meh", both of which released in 2020. Despite initially being intended as the lead single for Music, "All Red" did not appear on the final tracklist of the album when it released on March 14, 2025.

== Reception ==
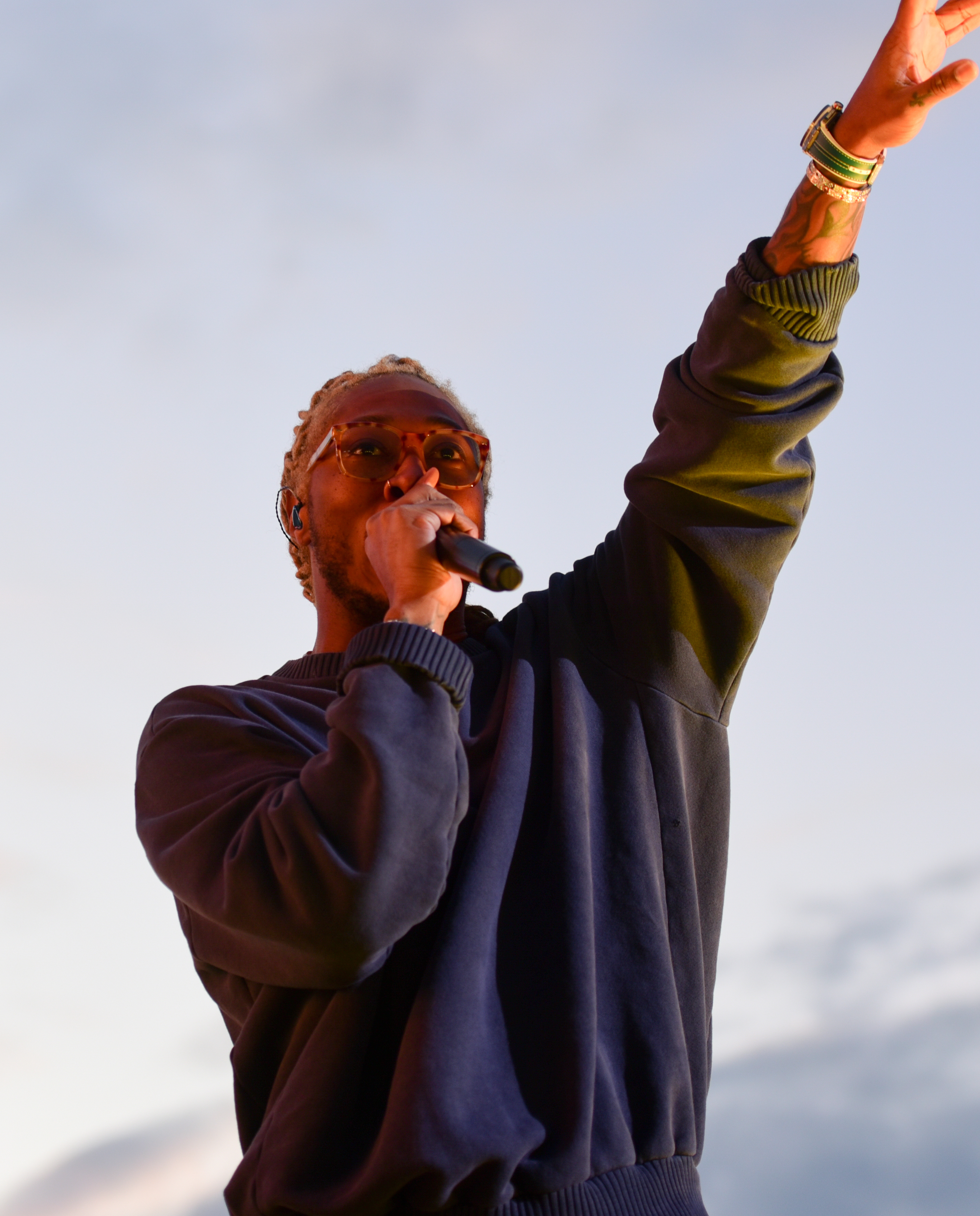
Playboi Carti's vocal delivery on "All Red" was compared to Future (pictured).

Upon the release of "All Red", listeners and publications alike noted the similarity of Playboi Carti's performance to the vocal delivery of fellow Atlanta rapper Future. Zachary Horvath of HotNewHipHop noted Playboi Carti's vocals were of a slightly higher pitch than Future, but was considered by many to be very similar nonetheless, comparing the situation to that of Desiigner. The discussion around the similarities became a trending topic on Twitter. Some internet users interpreted it as a testament to Future's influence, while others regarded it as an imitation. Regardless, Olivier Lafontant of Pitchfork reported a positive reception to the song from fans, although the release did not alleviate disappointment from some fans over the pre-order announcement teased prior to then.

HotNewHipHop writer Elias Andrews complimented the production of "All Red" but considered Playboi Carti's vocal delivery the "real highlight" of the song, regarding his new direction as "bold and adventurous in ways that most other rappers wouldn't attempt." Aaron Williams of Uproxx praised the vocal delivery in tandem with Playboi Carti's wordplay which gave the song a "menacing, but playful vibe." According to New Wave Magazine, the vocals and production "sets a tone that feels both raw and polished, capturing the chaotic energy that has come to define Carti's work." Complex ranked "All Red" sixth among the seven singles released by Playboi Carti by that point, with Rashad Alexander praising the production but calling the song "a bit anticlimactic" and noting the loss of the "raw energy" from the snippet compared to the official release. The Face listed "All Red" as a best new song, while Anthony Fantano dismissed it as a "rip-off" of Future.

In the United States, "All Red" amassed 19.5 million official streams, 500 digital downloads, and "negligible airplay" during its first week of release, debuting at number 15 on the Billboard Hot 100, number two on Hot Rap Songs, and number three on Hot R&B/Hip-Hop Songs, the latter serving as Playboi Carti's seventh top-ten song on the chart and his first as a lead artist. It also topped the Apple Music charts. Elsewhere, the track reached number 16 on the Billboard Global 200, number eight on Australia's ARIA Top 40 Hip Hop/R&B Singles Chart, and number 17 on the Canadian Hot 100, and number 32 and number two on the UK singles and Hip Hop and R&B charts respectively. The song was certified gold in Brazil by Pro-Música Brasil in 2025.

== Visualizer ==
A visualizer for "All Red" was released on September 16, marking the first ever such release by Playboi Carti. The visualizer is a compilation of various scenes from a "pop-up performance-meets-party" in Brooklyn celebrating his birthday days earlier. It depicts him and his entourage traveling through the city in SUVs, stopping at a store to buy a Billboard magazine with him on the cover, and visiting a club where he is seen alongside various celebrities including Nav, Meek Mill, and Luka Sabbat. The caption to the post of the visualizer read "Not official video", suggesting a music video was in the works.

== Personnel ==
Credits and personnel adapted from Tidal.

=== Musicians ===
- Jordan Carter – vocals
- Jarrod Morgan – production
- Mark Williams – production
- Raul Cubina (Ojivolta) – production
- Richard Ortiz (Ojivolta) – production
- Pierre Thevenot – production
- Stefan Cismigiu – production

=== Technical ===
- Glenn Schick – mastering
- Marcus Fritz – mixing
- Marcus Fritz – recording

== Charts ==
Chart performance for "All Red"
Chart (2024)	Peak position
Australia (ARIA)	54
Australia Hip Hop/R&B (ARIA)	8
Austria (Ö3 Austria Top 40)	13
Canada Hot 100 (Billboard)	17
Czech Republic Singles Digital (ČNS IFPI)	19
France (SNEP)	156
Germany (GfK)	54
Global 200 (Billboard)	16
Greece International (IFPI)	16
Hungary (Single Top 40)	33
Iceland (Tónlistinn)	6
Ireland (IRMA)	43
Latvia (LAIPA)	2
Lithuania (AGATA)	9
Netherlands (Single Top 100)	99
New Zealand (Recorded Music NZ)	20
Poland (Polish Streaming Top 100)	8
Romania (Billboard)	11
Slovakia Singles Digital (ČNS IFPI)	4
Sweden Heatseeker (Sverigetopplistan)	3
Switzerland (Schweizer Hitparade)	17
UK Singles (Official Charts)	32
UK Hip Hop/R&B (Official Charts)	2
US Billboard Hot 100	15
US Hot R&B/Hip-Hop Songs (Billboard)	3

== Certifications ==
Certifications for "All Red"
Region	Certification	Certified units/sales
Brazil (Pro-Música Brasil)	Gold	20,000^{‡}
^{‡} Sales+streaming figures based on certification alone.
