= Rather Lie =

Single by Playboi Carti and the Weeknd

from the album Music
- Released: March 26, 2025
- Genre: Cloud rap; alternative R&B
- Length: 3:29
- Label: AWGE; Interscope
- Songwriters: Jordan Carter; Abel Tesfaye; Mark Williams; Raul Cubina; Richard Ortiz; Jarrod Morgan; Julien Lopes; Kobe Hood; Devon Chisolm
- Producers: F1lthy; Ojivolta; Twisco; Ramzoid

Playboi Carti singles chronology
"Blick Sum" (remix) (2025)	"Rather Lie" (2025)	"Timeless" (remix) (2025)

The Weeknd singles chronology
"Cry for Me" (2025)	"Rather Lie" (2025)	"Timeless" (remix) (2025)

"Rather Lie" is a song by American rapper Playboi Carti and Canadian singer the Weeknd. It was sent to US rhythmic radio as the lead single from the former's third studio album, Music, on March 26, 2025. It was also sent to Italian radio airplay two days later. The song was produced by F1lthy, Ojivolta, Jarrod "Twisco" Morgan, and Ramzoid. "Rather Lie" reached number four on the US Billboard Hot 100, and peaked within the top-10 of several countries.

== Composition ==
"Rather Lie" features a chorus sung by the Weeknd which was described as a "dose of pop clarity" with a "breezy" and "earworm"-like hook, while Carti can be heard mumbling "sweet nothings". As a result, the song was one of the album's moments to be considered a "love song". On the song, Carti "calms things down" but switches it up later on by "manipulating his voice" and "gaslighting" his girlfriend as he gives an insight into his love life. It highlights the "ups and downs of intimacy" as Carti sounds "clear-eyed rather than self-pitying".

== Critical reception ==
The song was well received by music critics. In a ranking of all features on the album, Billboard's Mackenzie Cummings-Grady placed "Rather Lie" second and opined that the duo completed "their hat-trick" coming off the success of "Popular" (2023) and "Timeless" (2024). Cummings-Grady predicted the song to be another hit for the both of them. Angel Diaz and Michael Saponara later also ranked the song second of the overall album, calling it the "radio single" of the record and expressing their desire for a joint album of the two.

C. Vernon Coleman II at XXL listed "Rather Lie" as one of the early standout tracks and called it one of the "heaters" on the album. In a premature evaluation for Stereogum, Tom Breihan saw the song as a switch to "pop clarity" and viewed the track as one of the moments on the album that breaks the "storm" as "something more approachable shines through". Georgia Evans of Time Out named it one of the best songs of 2025 so far, calling it an "absolute belter" and praising the Weeknd's contributions.

== Live performances ==
Carti performed "Rather Lie" live for the first time at a 2024 Rolling Loud Miami flagship Festival, held on December 15. On June 9, 2025, Carti, alongside DJ Swamp Izzo, performed "Rather Lie" at the BET Awards 2025.

== Personnel ==
Credits and personnel adapted from Tidal and ASCAP.

Musicians

- Jordan Carter – vocals
- Abel Tesfaye – vocals
- Richard Oritz – production
- Mark Williams – production
- Raul Cubina – production
- Jarrod Morgan – production
- Julien Lopes – production
- Devon Chisolm – writing

Technical

- Glenn Schick – mastering
- Mike Dean – mixing
- Marcus Fritz – mixing, recording

== Charts ==
=== Weekly charts ===
Weekly chart performance for "Rather Lie"
Chart (2025)	Peak position
Australia (ARIA)	16
Australia Hip Hop/R&B (ARIA)	4
Austria (Ö3 Austria Top 40)	12
Canada Hot 100 (Billboard)	9
Czech Republic Singles Digital (ČNS IFPI)	12
Denmark (Tracklisten)	35
Finland (Suomen virallinen lista)	43
France (SNEP)	59
Global 200 (Billboard)	6
Greece International (IFPI)	8
Hungary (Single Top 40)	22
Iceland (Tónlistinn)	11
Ireland (IRMA)	27
Italy (FIMI)	63
Latvia (LaIPA)	2
Lithuania (AGATA)	7
Luxembourg (Billboard)	12
Netherlands (Single Top 100)	41
New Zealand (Recorded Music NZ)	7
Nigeria (TurnTable Top 100)	59
Norway (VG-lista)	31
Romania (Billboard)	15
Slovakia Singles Digital (ČNS IFPI)	5
Sweden (Sverigetopplistan)	49
Switzerland (Schweizer Hitparade)	8
UK Singles (Official Charts)	10
UK Hip Hop/R&B (Official Charts)	3
US Billboard Hot 100	4
US Hot R&B/Hip-Hop Songs (Billboard)	3
US R&B/Hip-Hop Airplay (Billboard)	7
US Rhythmic Airplay (Billboard)	1

=== Year-end charts ===
Year-end chart performance for "Rather Lie"
Chart (2025)	Position
US Billboard Hot 100	91
US Hot R&B/Hip-Hop Songs (Billboard)	18
US R&B/Hip-Hop Airplay (Billboard)	19
US Rhythmic Airplay (Billboard)	6

== Certifications ==
Certifications for "Rather Lie"
Region	Certification	Certified units/sales
Brazil (Pro-Música Brasil)	Gold	20,000^{‡}
New Zealand (RMNZ)	Gold	15,000^{‡}
United States (RIAA)	Platinum	1,000,000^{‡}
^{‡} Sales+streaming figures based on certification alone.
