= Pop Out (disambiguation) =

"Pop Out" is a song by American rappers Polo G and Lil Tjay.

Pop Out may also refer to:

- PopOut, a rule variation of the Connect Four connection game
- "Pop Out" (Lil Baby and Nardo Wick song), 2022
- "Pop Out" (Playboi Carti song), 2025
- "Pop Out", a song by Katie Got Bandz
- "Pop Out", a song by Lil Yachty from Lil Boat 2
- Pop out, another term for a pop fly in baseball
- Pop Out Zepp Tour, 2024 concert tour by Yoasobi
- The Pop Out: Ken & Friends, 2024 concert by Kendrick Lamar
