= Fine Shit =

2025 song by Playboi Carti

Song by Playboi Carti

from the album Music
- Released: March 14, 2025
- Genre: R&B
- Length: 1:46
- Label: AWGE; Interscope
- Songwriters: Jordan Carter; Mark Williams; Raul Cubina; Richard Ortiz; Keanu Torres; Kelvin Tang; Kobe Hood
- Producers: 99Hurts; F1lthy; Ojivolta; Keanu Beats

Music video
- Fine Shit on YouTube

"Fine Shit" (stylized in all caps) is a song by American rapper Playboi Carti. It was released through AWGE and Interscope Records as the ninth track from Carti's third studio album, Music, on March 14, 2025. The song was produced by 99Hurts, F1lthy, Ojivolta and Keanu Beats.

== Composition and lyrics ==
The song finds Playboi Carti using his signature "baby voice", performing in R&B style. The lyrics chiefly focus on a woman's beauty, while Carti also gives details of his own lifestyle ("In New York, I stepped in my Timbs, I can't feel my limbs / I just canceled one of my shows to watch me a film". In one moment, he follows his crooning with the line "The money gon' talk!" His performance in the song has also been regarded as resembling that of rapper Future.

== Critical reception ==
Billboard called "Fine Shit" the eighth best song on Music, with Angel Diaz commenting "First of all, we got Playboi Carti over a Cash Cobain beat before GTA 6. Second of all, I'm a fan of R&B Carti. However, the line about canceling one of his shows to enjoy a movie stuck out to me. Imagine running into Carti at like a David Lynch retrospective at Lincoln Center or some s—t like that. Might run into King Vamp at the New Beverly for the Bram Stoker's Dracula showing." Pitchfork's Alphonse Pierre gave a negative review of the song, writing that "even though the beat is pretty", "the misogyny baked into controlling lyrics like, 'My bitch so bad, she can't even go outside / My bitch so bad, she can't even post online' is amplified when you've been arrested for allegedly choking your girlfriend." Craig Jenkins of Vulture called the song "deceptively saccharine" and regarded the line "The money gon' talk" as one of the two "exceedingly strange noises" that Carti makes on the album, comparing it to a "lech yelling at the TV as the lead in a rom-com begins to trust a love interest."

== Personnel ==
Credits and personnel adapted from Tidal.

Musicians

- Jordan Carter – vocals
- Mark Williams – production
- Raul Cubina – production
- Richard Oritz – production

Technical

- Ojivolta – mastering
- Marcus Fritz – mixing, recording
- Ojivolta – recording

== Charts ==
Chart performance for "Fine Shit"
Chart (2025)	Peak position
Australia (ARIA)	78
Australia Hip Hop/R&B (ARIA)	22
Canada Hot 100 (Billboard)	47
Global 200 (Billboard)	36
Lithuania (AGATA)	44
UK Audio Streaming (Official Charts)	76
US Billboard Hot 100	33
US Hot R&B/Hip-Hop Songs (Billboard)	16
