= Cocaine Nose (song) =

Song by Playboi Carti

from the album Music
- Released: March 14, 2025
- Recorded: 2024
- Genre: Trap; rage; rap rock
- Length: 2:32
- Label: AWGE; Interscope
- Songwriters: Jordan Carter; Richard Oritz; Kyle Brooks; Santiago Kytnar; Ashanti Douglas; Irving Lorenzo; Denzil Foster; Jay King; Thomas McElroy; Marcus Vest
- Producers: F1lthy; 100Yrd; Brak3; Seven

"Cocaine Nose" (stylized in all caps) is a song by American rapper Playboi Carti. It was released through AWGE and Interscope Records as the twentieth track from Carti's third studio album, Music, on March 14, 2025. The song was written by Playboi Carti, alongside producers F1lthy, 100Yrd, Brak3, and Seven. It contains a sample of "Only U" by Ashanti.

== Background and composition ==
On December 15, 2024, Playboi Carti was confirmed as part of the American festival Rolling Loud, where he performed "Cocaine Nose". The song samples Ashanti's 2004 single "Only U", more specifically the guitar riff, which was taken from the song "Presence" by Aurelius.

== Reception ==
"Cocaine Nose"
A sample of the pre-chorus and chorus of "Cocaine Nose"; the pre-chorus synth-stimulated brass and the chorus consists of drumbeats.

"Cocaine Nose" received mixed reviews from music critics. Davy Reed of The Face felt the song fell into the "brilliant half" of Music's songs, writing that he had been looking forward to its release since its debut at Rolling Loud so he could "hear that moshpit opening guitar riff in all its glory."

Other reviewers were often more negative. For Pitchfork, Kieran Press-Reynolds stated that it "has all the juddering grotesquerie of Carti's Whole Lotta Red hits without the relentless assault of 'On That Time' or 'JumpOutTheHouse.'" Jay'Mi Vazquez of Southern News felt that songs like it "leave listeners wondering if the album was shaped more by industry pressures than artistic intent." Billboard ranked the song at fifteenth place in a list of the songs on Music.

== Commercial performance ==
Following the release of Music, "Cocaine Nose" peaked at number 80 on the US Billboard Hot 100 chart.

== Credits and personnel ==
- Jordan Carter - composer, lyricist
- Richard Ortiz - composer, lyricist
- Kyle Brooks - composer, lyricist
- Marcus Vest - composer, lyricist
- Marcus Fritz - mixing, recording engineer
- Glenn Schick - mastering
- F1lthy - producer
- 100yrd - producer
- Seven - producer

== Charts ==
Chart performance for "Cocaine Nose"
Chart (2025)	Peak position
Canada Hot 100 (Billboard)	74
US Billboard Hot 100	80
US Hot R&B/Hip-Hop Songs (Billboard)	40
Global 200 (Billboard)	88
