= Trim (song) =

2025 song by Playboi Carti and Future

Song by Playboi Carti and Future

from the album Music
- Released: March 14, 2025
- Length: 3:13
- Label: AWGE; Interscope
- Songwriters: Jordan Carter; Nayvadius Wilburn; Benjamin Shields; Bryan Simmons; Hunter Brown; Kenneth Smith; Sidney Tapaquon
- Producers: TM88; Akachi; CSD Sid; Macnificent; Sonickaboom

"Trim" (stylized in all caps) is a song by American rappers Playboi Carti and Future. It was released through AWGE and Interscope Records as the nineteenth track from Carti's third studio album, Music, on March 14, 2025. The song was produced by TM88, Akachi, CSD Sid, Macnificent and Sonickaboom.

== Content ==
The song sees the rappers detailing their luxury lifestyles and also revolves around sex and partying. The chorus is built around the term "trim".

== Critical reception ==
Billboard placed the song at number 17 in their ranking of the songs from Music and in ninth place on their list of the album's best guest features. Mackenzie Cummings-Grady wrote that "When Future finally enunciates and decides to rap, the result is exactly what you want from a Pluto verse. Carti's grainy baritone meshes perfectly with Future's galloping pace" and "The result on 'Trim' isn't anything groundbreaking, but it's impossible not to nod your head along to its undeniable groove." Ben Beaumont-Thomas of The Guardian remarked "Future's triplet flow is fearsome and relentless on Trim, as if putting his nose to your face and backing you towards a ledge". Christian Eede of The Quietus, on the other hand, stated that Future "largely phones it in" with his performance.

== Personnel ==
Credits and personnel adapted from Tidal.

Musicians

- Jordan Carter – vocals
- Nayvadius Wilburn – vocals
- Bryan Simmons – production
- Benjamin Shields – production
- Hunter Brown – production
- Kenneth Smith – production
- Sidney Tapaquon – production

Technical

- Ojivolta – mastering
- Marcus Fritz – mixing, recording

== Charts ==
Chart performance for "Trim"
Chart (2025)	Peak position
Australia Hip Hop/R&B (ARIA)	35
Canada Hot 100 (Billboard)	59
Global 200 (Billboard)	60
Lithuania (AGATA)	56
US Billboard Hot 100	46
US Hot R&B/Hip-Hop Songs (Billboard)	22
