= I Seeeeee You Baby Boi =

2025 song by Playboi Carti

Song by Playboi Carti

from the album Music
- Released: March 14, 2025
- Genre: Rage
- Length: 2:38
- Label: AWGE; Interscope
- Songwriters: Jordan Carter; Corey Moon; Stefan Cismigiu; Kenneth Pannu
- Producers: Lucian; DJ Moon; KP Beatz

"I Seeeeee You Baby Boi" (stylized in all caps, also known simply as "I See You") is a song by American rapper Playboi Carti. It was released through AWGE and Interscope Records as the sixteenth track from his third studio album, Music, on March 14, 2025. The song was written by Playboi Carti, alongside producers Stefan "Lucian" Cismigiu, Corey “DJ” Moon, and Kenneth “KP Beatz” Pannu.

== Composition ==
The song uses the "pre-hyperrap sound" from his previous album Whole Lotta Red, with "chilling" electronics that has been considered reminiscent of Drain Gang's music. It finds Playboi Carti singing in a soft, high-pitched voice. In the lyrics, he reflects on his humble beginnings and overcoming obstacles in his career path, before wondering if a certain girl loves him.

== Critical reception ==
Billboard ranked it as the 20th best song from Music. In a review of Music, Alphonse Pierre of Pitchfork wrote "Sharper is 'I Seeeeee You Baby Boi,' where the combination of Carti's vaporous melodies and DJ Moon and Lucian's lush beat creates a flamboyant bounce."

== Personnel ==
Credits and personnel adapted from Tidal.

Musicians

- Jordan Carter – vocals
- Corey Moon – production
- Stefan Cismiglu – production

Technical

- Ojivolta – mastering
- Marcus Fritz – mixing
- DJ Moon – recording

== Charts ==
Chart performance for "I Seeeeee You Baby Boi"
Chart (2025)	Peak position
Australia Hip Hop/R&B (ARIA)	31
Canada Hot 100 (Billboard)	62
Global 200 (Billboard)	61
Lithuania (AGATA)	48
UK Audio Streaming (Official Charts)	95
US Billboard Hot 100	54
US Hot R&B/Hip-Hop Songs (Billboard)	27
