= Toxic (Playboi Carti and Skepta song) =

2025 song by Playboi Carti and Skepta

Song by Playboi Carti and Skepta

from the album Music
- Released: March 14, 2025
- Length: 2:15
- Label: AWGE; Interscope
- Songwriters: Jordan Carter; Joseph Adenuga; Ronald LaTour, Jr.; Ciaran Mullan; Dylan Cleary-Krell; Moritz Leppers
- Producers: Cardo; Mu Lean; Dez Wright; Stoopid Lou

"Toxic" (stylized in all caps) is a song by American rapper Playboi Carti and British rapper Skepta. It was released through AWGE and Interscope Records as the eleventh track from Carti's third studio album, Music, on March 14, 2025. The song was written by Playboi Carti and Skepta, alongside producers Cardo, Ciaran "Mu Lean" Mullan, Dylan "Dez Wright" Cleary-Krell and Moritz “Stoopid Lou” Leppers. Playboi Carti's performance in the song has widely been regarded as resembling that of rapper Future.

== Critical reception ==
Billboard placed "Toxic" at numbers 27 and 11 in their respective rankings of the songs and guest appearances on Music. As for the latter list, Mackenzie Cummings-Grady wrote "Hearing Skepta wade his way through Playboi Carti's suffocating beat on 'Toxic' should be more fun than it actually is. Skepta instead opts for his usual barrage of braggadocious bars, which goes against the grain of the song's dark and clustered beat. His verse is also incredibly short, which begs the question whether this song would be higher on the list if Skepta had more time to breathe. Guess we'll never know." Mosi Reeves of Rolling Stone remarked that "Skepta delivers a killer verse on 'Toxic.' When he raps, 'I study the streets, how you gonna war with a genius' in his stentorian British voice, he adds much needed ballast to a vibe that often feels overly wavy, and internet addled." Alphonse Pierre of Pitchfork stated "I'll give Carti a pass for Skepta's brief appearance on 'Toxic,' because together they revive the unbothered fly of the Cozy Tapes." Vulture's Craig Jenkins commented "At first pass, the slurring trunk-rattler 'Toxic' conjures the image of the DS2 star rhyming his way through anaphylaxis."

== Personnel ==
Credits and personnel adapted from Tidal.

Musicians

- Jordan Carter – vocals
- Joseph Adenuga Jr. – vocals
- Ronald LaTour, Jr. – production
- Dylan Clearly-Krell – production

Technical

- Ojivolta – mastering
- Marcus Fritz – mixing, recording

== Charts ==
Chart performance for "Toxic"
Chart (2025)	Peak position
Australia (ARIA)	46
Australia Hip Hop/R&B (ARIA)	12
Canada Hot 100 (Billboard)	46
France (SNEP)	178
Global 200 (Billboard)	32
Lithuania (AGATA)	10
New Zealand (Recorded Music NZ)	27
UK Singles (Official Charts)	21
UK Hip Hop/R&B (Official Charts)	19
US Billboard Hot 100	34
US Hot R&B/Hip-Hop Songs (Billboard)	17

== Certifications ==
Certifications for "Toxic"
Region	Certification	Certified units/sales
Brazil (Pro-Música Brasil)	Gold	20,000^{‡}
New Zealand (RMNZ)	Gold	15,000^{‡}
^{‡} Sales+streaming figures based on certification alone.
