= Charge Dem Hoes a Fee =

2025 song by Playboi Carti, Future and Travis Scott

Song by Playboi Carti, Future and Travis Scott

from the album Music
- Released: March 14, 2025
- Length: 3:45
- Label: AWGE; Interscope
- Songwriters: Jordan Carter; Jacques Webster; Nayvadius Wilburn; Wesley Glass; Joshua Luellen; Dylan-Cleary Krell; Matthew-Kyle Brown; Carlton McDowell Jr.; Lucas DePante
- Producers: Wheezy; Southside; Dez Wright; Smatt Sertified; Car!ton; Juke Wong

"Charge Dem Hoes a Fee" (stylized in all caps) is a song by American rappers Playboi Carti, Future and Travis Scott. It was released through AWGE and Interscope Records as the fourteenth track from Carti's third studio album, Music, on March 14, 2025. The song was written by Playboi Carti, Future and Travis Scott, alongside producers Wheezy, Southside, Dez Wright, Smatt Sertified, Car!ton, and Juke Wong.

== Critical reception ==
The song received generally mixed reviews. Billboard considered it the third best song from Music but placed it at number 12 (second-to-last) in their ranking of the album's guest features, with Mackenzie Cummings-Grady writing "Future taps into his grumbly 'Plutoski' bag on most of his guest appearances on MUSIC, but his verse on 'Charge Dem Hoes a Fee' is barely even a verse. His repetitive hook also doesn't elevate the track to any heights, and the messy song ends so abruptly it feels almost like a demo. Carti seemed to have tossed this one just to add another Future tag into the mix, but the result goes in one ear and out the other pretty quickly." Kyann-Sian Williams of NME commented the rappers "flex their tough-guy personas, but Future's absurd lines – 'Don't do dumb shit / Don't do horse shit… / Don't do chicken shit / Don't do cow shit' – adds hilarity to the otherwise bolshy soon-to-be ATL club classic.'" Reviewing Music for Rolling Stone, Mosi Reeves cited it as among the songs that "falter from mundanity". Vulture's Craig Jenkins, who noted that Playboi Carti sounded like Future in some tracks across the album, remarked that the song, with Future's actual appearance, "makes the Carti deep voice all over Music feel small." Aron A. of HotNewHipHop stated the track "embodies mixtape-era revivalism—muddy, lo-fi, and sinister yet colossal and rager-ready". Christian Eede of The Quietus was critical of the guest appearances, writing "Travis Scott guests in typically forgettable and underwhelming fashion" and "Future also largely phones it in".

== Personnel ==
Credits and personnel adapted from Tidal.

Musicians

- Jordan Carter – vocals
- Nayvadius Wilburn – vocals
- Jacques Webster – vocals
- Wesley Glass – production

Technical

- Glenn Schick – mastering
- Jonathan Turner – mixing
- Marcus Fritz – mixing
- Marcus Fritz – recording

== Charts ==
Chart performance for "Charge Dem Hoes a Fee"
Chart (2025)	Peak position
Australia Hip Hop/R&B (ARIA)	29
Canada Hot 100 (Billboard)	58
Global 200 (Billboard)	58
Lithuania (AGATA)	49
UK Audio Streaming (OCC)	98
US Billboard Hot 100	49
US Hot R&B/Hip-Hop Songs (Billboard)	24
