= Like Weezy =

2025 song by Playboi Carti

Song by Playboi Carti

from the album Music
- Released: March 14, 2025
- Length: 1:55
- Label: AWGE; Interscope
- Songwriters: Jordan Carter; Mark Williams; Raul Cubina; Kelvin Magnussen; Kazarion Fowler; Willie Jerome Byrd; Kaelub Denson; Kevin Denson
- Producers: Ojivolta; Kelvin Krash

Music video
- Like Weezy on YouTube

"Like Weezy" (stylized in all caps) is a song by American rapper Playboi Carti. It was released through AWGE and Interscope Records as the twenty-fifth track from Carti's third studio album, Music, on March 14, 2025. The song was written by Playboi Carti, alongside producers Ojivolta and Kelvin Krash. The song contains a sample of "Bend Over" by Rich Kidz.

== Composition ==
The song incorporates elements of "8-bit vaporwave". Playboi Carti adopts a vocal delivery that has been considered similar to that of Danny Brown or Young Thug's early career, and honors Lil Wayne in his lyrics while also rapping about sex and drug use.

== Critical reception ==
The song was positively received by listeners and critics, many who praised the sample and throwback sound to 2000s Atlanta rap. Billboard placed the song at number 21 in their ranking of the songs from Music. Reviewing Music for Pitchfork, Alphonse Pierre wrote "Carti's restlessness is the engine of the album, a reflection of his boredom, attention span, and unbridled imagination in equal measure. That chaos is hollow when he's hastily following the blueprint of popular prestige rap albums, thrilling when it's used to capture the feeling of the music in his bloodstream. For example, he's having a shit-talking ball on the Rich Kidz homage 'Like Weezy.'"

In their year-end charts, Rolling Stone ranked "Like Weezy" at #18 out of 100. Citing how the track flipped Rich Kidz's "Bend Over" into a "chirpy and hypnotic bop for a new viral age."

== Live performances and remixes ==
On June 9, 2025, Carti, alongside DJ Swamp Izzo, performed "Like Weezy" at the BET Awards 2025.

The song has been remixed by rappers DC the Don and Lil Novi (Lil Wayne's son).

== Personnel ==
Credits and personnel adapted from Tidal.

Musicians

- Jordan Carter – vocals
- Mark Williams – production
- Raul Cubina – production
- Kelvin Magnussen – production

Technical

- Ojivolta – mastering
- Marcus Fritz – mixing, recording

== Charts ==
Chart performance for "Like Weezy"
Chart (2025)	Peak position
Canada Hot 100 (Billboard)	69
Global 200 (Billboard)	87
US Billboard Hot 100	56
US Hot R&B/Hip-Hop Songs (Billboard)	26
