= Mojo Jojo (song) =

2025 song by Playboi Carti

Song by Playboi Carti

from the album Music
- Released: March 14, 2025
- Recorded: 2023–2025
- Length: 2:36
- Label: AWGE; Interscope
- Songwriters: Jordan Carter; Ronald LaTour, Jr.; John Julian; Kendrick Duckworth
- Producers: Cardo; Johnny Juliano

"Mojo Jojo" (stylized in all caps) is a song by American rapper Playboi Carti. It was released through AWGE and Interscope Records as the fifth track from Carti's third studio album, Music, on March 14, 2025. It features additional vocals from American rapper Kendrick Lamar, who performs only in ad-libs. The song was written by Playboi Carti, Kendrick Lamar, alongside producers Cardo, and Johnny Juliano.

== Critical reception ==
The song received generally positive reviews. Billboard put it in sixth place in their rankings of both the songs and guest features from Music, writing in regard to the latter "Even though K-Dot is only tossing in some ad-libs to help push Carti along, hearing him strut around King Vamp's world is exhilarating. The bass rattles Kendrick's nasally voice, which Carti drowns in Auto-Tune to make the Nobel Prize winner sound like an alien. 'Mojo Jojo' is just a teaser of what's to come, but hearing Kendrick grumble, 'We go dummy' is indeed enough to make anyone go 'dummy.'" Alexander Cole of HotNewHipHop stated "Overall, 'MOJO JOJO' is absolutely fire as it sees Carti and Kendrick going back and forth on Cardo production. Both artists sound like evil aliens and it is by far one of the more pleasant collaborations of the year so far. The production and the flows might be a bit foreign to some listeners at first. However, when you understand the vibe they are going for, you quickly realize just how dope this track is. Some were concerned about how Carti would fit with Kendrick. Hopefully, this song puts all of those fears to rest. Playboi Carti brought his A-game on MUSIC and this song is proof of that." Ben Beaumont-Thomas of The Guardian called Lamar a "trickster-god capering on Carti's shoulder, throwing mischievous ad-libs in his ear" and commented on Carti's voice, "there are deep pronouncements like a vocal-fried wizard: his delivery of the phrase 'he a goon' is worth the price of admission alone." Reviewing the album for Stereogum, Tom Breihan was less impressed by Lamar's feature, writing "Even Kendrick Lamar feels out of place when he's doing anything other than the 'Mojo Jojo' ad-libs, where he sounds less like a collaborator and more like a fan."

== Personnel ==
Credits and personnel adapted from Tidal.

Musicians

- Jordan Carter – vocals
- Kendrick Lamar – vocals
- Ronald LaTour, Jr. – production
- Jason Pounds – production

Technical

- Glenn Schick – mastering
- Jonathan Turner – mixing
- Marcus Fritz – mixing, recording

== Charts ==
Chart performance for "Mojo Jojo"
Chart (2025)	Peak position
Australia (ARIA)	60
Australia Hip Hop/R&B (ARIA)	16
Canada Hot 100 (Billboard)	37
France (SNEP)	140
Global 200 (Billboard)	26
Lithuania (AGATA)	15
Sweden Heatseeker (Sverigetopplistan)	16
UK Audio Streaming (OCC)	61
US Billboard Hot 100	27
US Hot R&B/Hip-Hop Songs (Billboard)	13
