= Clarence O. Smith =

American media executive (1933–2025)

Clarence O. Smith (March 31, 1933 – April 21, 2025) was an American media executive. He was one of the four original founders of Essence magazine and served as the company's president, in charge of advertising and marketing, through 2002. He attended City College of New York.
