= Backd00r =

2025 song by Playboi Carti featuring Kendrick Lamar and Jhené Aiko

Single by Playboi Carti featuring Kendrick Lamar and Jhené Aiko

from the album Music
- Released: October 14, 2025
- Genre: R&B; melodic rap; chipmunk soul
- Length: 3:10
- Label: AWGE; Interscope
- Songwriters: Jordan Carter; Kendrick Duckworth; Jhené Chilombo; Mark Williams; Raul Cubina; Keanu Torres; Jarrod Morgan; Jugraj Nagra; Darius Rameshni; Ruchaun Akers Jr.; Dwayne Carter Jr.; Marcello Valenzano; Andre Lyon; Antony Olabode; Beverley Knight; Victor Redwood-Sawyerr
- Producers: Ojivolta; Twisco; Keanu Beats; Nagra; Darius Rameshni

Playboi Carti singles chronology
"Timeless (remix)" (2025)	"Backd00r" (2025)	"Smaxk or Die" (2026)

Kendrick Lamar singles chronology
"Peekaboo" (2025)	"Backd00r" (2025)	"Good Flirts" (2026)

Jhené Aiko singles chronology
"Can't Hide It" (2025)	"Backd00r" (2025)

"Backd00r" (stylized in all caps) is a song by American rapper Playboi Carti, featuring American rapper Kendrick Lamar and American singer Jhené Aiko. It was released to US rhythmic radio on October 14, 2025 as the second single from Carti's third studio album, Music. The song was written by Playboi Carti and Kendrick Lamar, alongside producers Ojivolta, Keanu Beats, Darius Rameshni, Jugraj Nagra, and Jarrod "Twisco" Morgan. The song contains a sample of "Mutual Feeling" by Beverley Knight.

== Composition ==
The song finds all three artists performing in a crooning, melodic style, over production that music critics have described as "Hungarian psych sample underpinning the superb Philly, dainty chipmunk-soul" and a "swishy Evilgiane-type beat". Kendrick Lamar and Jhené Aiko both sing on the chorus, where Playboi Carti also repeatedly chirps "backdoor". Lamar displays a vocal style that has been compared to his performances on his collaborations with SZA, "Luther" and "30 for 30".

== Critical reception ==
The song received positive reviews. Billboard ranked it the best song from Music and also at fourth place in a list of the album's best guest features, writing that Playboi Carti's verses "add the perfect bit of spice" to Kendrick Lamar's melodies and "Kendrick has yet to spit any serious bars at this point in the album, but hearing him and Carti together remains exciting as they chart this new territory together." Kyann-Sian Williams of NME considered it the best collaboration between Carti and Lamar on the album. Charles Lyons-Burt of Slant Magazine called "Backd00r" the "antithesis to Whole Lotta Red's shifty paranoia", additionally commenting "The result is the one of the most seductive Carti tracks ever."

== Personnel ==
Credits and personnel adapted from Tidal.

Musicians

- Jordan Carter – vocals
- Kendrick Lamar – vocals
- Jhené Aiko – vocals
- Mark Williams – production
- Raul Cubina – production
- Keanu Torres – production
- Daruis Rameshni – production
- Jugraj Nagra – production

Technical

- Glenn Schick – mastering
- Jonathan Turner – mixing
- Marcus Fritz – mixing, recording
- Ray Charles Brown Jr. – recording

== Charts ==
Chart performance for "Backd00r"
Chart (2025)	Peak position
Australia (ARIA)	61
Australia Hip Hop/R&B (ARIA)	17
Canada Hot 100 (Billboard)	36
Czech Republic Singles Digital (ČNS IFPI)	52
France (SNEP)	139
Global 200 (Billboard)	25
Lithuania (AGATA)	31
New Zealand (Recorded Music NZ)	36
Slovakia Singles Digital (ČNS IFPI)	35
Sweden Heatseeker (Sverigetopplistan)	17
UK Audio Streaming (Official Charts)	57
US Billboard Hot 100	25
US Hot R&B/Hip-Hop Songs (Billboard)	11
US Rhythmic Airplay (Billboard)	18
