= Opm Babi =

2025 song by Playboi Carti

Song by Playboi Carti

from the album Music
- Released: March 14, 2025
- Genre: Trap; rage
- Length: 2:53
- Label: AWGE; Interscope
- Songwriters: Jordan Carter; Jaylan Tucker; Corey Kerr; Keian B
- Producers: OpiumBaby; Clayco; Streo

"Opm Babi" (stylized in all caps; pronounced "opium baby") is a song by American rapper Playboi Carti. It was released through AWGE and Interscope Records as the twenty-third track from Carti's third studio album, Music, on March 14, 2025. The song was produced by OpiumBaby, Clayco and Streo. A music video would be posted onto Playboi Carti's Instagram burner account two days later.

== Composition ==
"Opm Babi" is a trap song with bass-heavy rage influences, reminiscent of 2000s and early-to-mid 2010s trap mixtapes tapes but also similar in sound to his 2018 album Die Lit. Playboi Carti performs in his "baby voice", as he describes his oral sex activities, and addiction to drugs such as pills and ketamine. The instrumental is laden with various sound effects from DJ Swamp Izzo.

== Critical reception ==
The song received generally mixed reviews from music critics. Billboard placed the song at number 29 (second-to-last) in their ranking of the songs on Music, with Michael Saponara stating "There are times when clashing aesthetics and opposites attract, but this isn't one, as Swamp Izzo's tag feels overbearing" and the song "could've been taken to another level." Pitchfork's Alphonse Pierre critically described the song as "basically Carti's take on 1017 Thug's stream-of-conscious mayhem, with a clash of gunshots, Swamp Izzo supervillain laughs, and blown-out bass", adding that Playboi Carti's "pitch rapidly shifts from sounding like he’s mid-burp to high enough that, when he hangs onto a note at the end, he almost channels the falsetto of a teenage Tevin Campbell." Mosi Reeves of Rolling Stone called it one of the songs from Music that "scintillate with weirdly alluring funk". Reviewing the album for The Quietus, Christian Eede commented, "'OLYMPIAN' and 'OPM BABI' are a febrile one-two punch of bass-boosted Atlanta trap brilliance, the latter in particular a dizzying clash of gunshot samples, the rapper's Auto-Tune-assisted falsetto and the maxed-out vocal tags of Swamp Izzo". During a stream with PlaqueBoyMax, Will Smith quoted how he likes the rhythm to the song. On Pitchfork's year-end song raking chart, "Opm Babi" was ranked at #6 out of 40.

== Personnel ==
Credits and personnel adapted from Tidal.

Musicians

- Jordan Carter – vocals
- Jaylan Tucker – production
- Corey Kerr – production

Technical

- Ojivolta – mastering
- Marcus Fritz – mixing, recording

== Charts ==
Chart performance for "Opm Babi"
Chart (2025)	Peak position
Canada Hot 100 (Billboard)	79
Global 200 (Billboard)	100
Lithuania (AGATA)	71
US Billboard Hot 100	75
US Hot R&B/Hip-Hop Songs (Billboard)	36
