= Pop Out (Playboi Carti song) =

2025 song by Playboi Carti

Song by Playboi Carti

from the album Music
- Released: March 14, 2025
- Recorded: 2023 – March 14, 2025
- Genre: Rage
- Length: 2:41
- Label: AWGE; Interscope
- Songwriters: Jordan Carter; Dwan Avery; Nicholas Santos; Phillip Mueller
- Producers: Slowburnz; DY Krazy; DJH

"Pop Out" (stylized in all caps) is a song by American rapper Playboi Carti. It was released through AWGE and Interscope Records as the opening track from Carti's third studio album, Music, on March 14, 2025. The song was written by Playboi Carti, alongside producers Slowburnz, DY Krazy and DJH.

== Background ==
"Pop Out" was first premiered during Playboi Carti's set at the 2023 Wireless Festival. DJ Swamp Izzo stated during an interview with Complex that the song was completed the same day as when the album was released.

== Composition ==
"Pop Out" is a rage song that has been regarded as a development of the style used in his previous album Whole Lotta Red as well as his punk and SoundCloud rap influences from his early career. The electronic production consists of a vibrating beat, with 808s and hi-hats. Playboi Carti raps in guttural, hoarse and gasping vocals.

== Critical reception ==
The song received generally favorable reviews. Billboard put it in last place in their ranking of the songs from Music, with Angel Diaz writing "This sounds like noise, honestly. However, I can see a bunch of the kids moshing to this and I might change my mind if I saw this song being performed live. I'm sure they're going to be hanging from the rafters as Carti jumps around onstage." Tom Breihan of Stereogum described it as a "song that sounds like someone Auto-Tuned the noise a fork makes when it's stuck in a garbage disposal" and a "hell of an opener, an abrasive electro-grind slathered with digital distortion that's been carefully engineered to hurt your feelings." Paper commented the song "begins with a raucous, ridiculously fun industrial beat that signals an album worth waiting for. What's Carti saying on the song? I have no idea – but the beat feels totally divine and evil in equal measure, always the best possible way for a Carti song to feel. If anything, it reminds me of hearing Yeezus for the first time and being totally taken aback by the rush of static at the beginning of "On Sight." Christian Eede of The Quietus called it a "pleasingly rowdy banger".

== Personnel ==
Credits and personnel adapted from Tidal.

Musicians

- Jordan Carter – vocals
- Dwan Avery – production
- Nicholas Santos – production
- Philip Mueller – production

Technical

- Ojivolta – mastering
- Marcus Fritz – mixing, recording

== Charts ==
Chart performance for "Pop Out"
Chart (2025)	Peak position
Australia (ARIA)	70
Australia Hip Hop/R&B (ARIA)	18
Canada Hot 100 (Billboard)	54
Estonia (TopHit)	20
France (SNEP)	173
Global 200 (Billboard)	37
Lithuania (AGATA)	25
UK Audio Streaming (Official Charts)	70
US Billboard Hot 100	41
US Hot R&B/Hip-Hop Songs (Billboard)	19
