= Timeless (The Weeknd and Playboi Carti song) =

2024 single by the Weeknd and Playboi Carti

Single by the Weeknd and Playboi Carti

from the album Hurry Up Tomorrow
- Released: September 27, 2024
- Studio: Other Island (Miami Beach); Louis Vuitton (Paris)
- Genre: Trap
- Length: 4:16
- Label: XO; Republic
- Songwriters: Abel Tesfaye; Pharrell Williams; Michael Dean; Mark Williams; Raul Cubina; Jarrod Morgan; Kobe Hood; Tariq Sharrieff; Devon Chisolm
- Producers: Pharrell Williams; Ojivolta; Mike Dean; Twisco

The Weeknd singles chronology
"Dancing in the Flames" (2024)	"Timeless" (2024)	"São Paulo" (2024)

Playboi Carti singles chronology
"All Red" (2024)	"Timeless" (2024)	"Blick Sum" (2025)

Audio sample
- Timeless: file; help

Music video
- "Timeless" on YouTube

"Timeless" is a song by Canadian singer and songwriter the Weeknd and American rapper Playboi Carti. It was released on September 27, 2024, through XO and Republic Records as the lead single from the former's sixth studio album, Hurry Up Tomorrow (2025). Produced by Pharrell Williams, Mike Dean, Ojivolta, and Jarrod "Twisco" Morgan, the song received generally positive reviews from music critics, and was a commercial success, peaking at number three on the US Billboard Hot 100 and number eight on the Billboard Global 200, and debuted in then reached the top ten in 15 countries. The remix, released on May 9, 2025, features American rapper Doechii.

== Background and promotion ==
The Weeknd and Playboi Carti first collaborated on the song "Popular" with American singer Madonna, released as part of the now scrapped soundtrack album from The Idol. Following the collaboration, the Weeknd went on to praise what he and Carti brought together on the track and during their sessions. On August 26, 2024, Carti posted on his Instagram a photo of himself and the Weeknd on FaceTime, teasing at a possible second collaboration.

On September 7, during his "one night only" concert in São Paulo, Brazil, the Weeknd performed eight tracks off of his then-upcoming album Hurry Up Tomorrow, including a live debut of "Timeless" and a medley of "Fein" by Travis Scott and Carti, as well as the Weeknd's "Until I Bleed Out". The concert was followed up by the release of "Dancing in the Flames", which was intended to be the lead single of the Weeknd's then-upcoming album Hurry Up Tomorrow. On September 25, The Weeknd shared a social media post with a screenshot from the music video of "Timeless". He simultaneously confirmed the song to be released on September 27 as the album's second single.

Upon the album's release, "Dancing in the Flames" was removed from the track listing of Hurry Up Tomorrow, and "Timeless" was therewith reworked as the project's lead single. The single's cover features a man wearing a King Baldwin mask with the title "Timeless" on it.

It also served as the official theme song for WWE's WrestleMania 41, marking the Weeknd's sixth straight year in a row that his track served as the theme song for the annual event.

== Critical reception ==
Upon release, "Timeless" received generally positive reviews from music critics. Pitchfork's Kieran Press-Reynolds praised the track's "tasteful" and "seamless" sound, describing it as "cosmic lounge music with catchy lyrics" such as the main hook "Ever since I was a jit, knew I was the shit". However, he critiqued the song's "deeply manicured" production and strategic timing, noting that despite its title, both artists seem aware that "their fame won't last forever."

The song initially met moderate success but gained in popularity, streaming and sales following the release of "Hurry Up, Tomorrow", topping the charts in India and Greece, and reaching the top ten in Denmark, Austria, Canada, Iceland, Germany, Norway, Poland, Malaysia, Switzerland and New Zealand, top twenty in Sweden, Australia, France, Hungary, Japan and Singapore, top thirty in the Netherlands, and top fifty in Belgium and Italy.

== Accolades ==
Awards and nominations for "Timeless"
Organisation	Year	Category	Result	Ref.
MTV Video Music Awards	2025	Video of the Year	Nominated	
MTV Video Music Awards	2025	Song of the Year	Nominated	
MTV Video Music Awards	2025	Best R&B	Nominated	

== Music video ==
The music video would be teased two days before the single's initial release; a still picture from the music video was posted on the Weeknd's Instagram page. The music video was eventually released on the Weeknd's YouTube page, three days after the song's release. Directed by Gunner Stahl and LouieKnows, who both previously had worked frequently with Playboi Carti, and produced by production company Sands, the video depicts the two musicians performing with young women inside a dark, blacked out soundstage, briefly followed by visuals of the previous album, After Hours, depicted as "Hell", the first part of Divine Comedy. That was filmed in the queue for The Weeknd's "Nightmare Trilogy" Haunted House from Universal Studios Hollywood's Halloween Horror Nights.

The video earned a nomination for Video of the Year at the 2025 MTV Video Music Awards.

== Remix ==
"Timeless" (remix)

Single by the Weeknd and Playboi Carti featuring Doechii
- Released: May 9, 2025
- Genre: Trap
- Length: 3:48
- Label: XO; Republic
- Songwriters: Abel Tesfaye; Pharrell Williams; Michael Dean; Mark Williams; Raul Cubina; Jarrod Morgan; Kobe Hood; Tariq Sharrieff; Devon Chisolm; Jaylah Hickmon
- Producers: Pharrell Williams; Ojivolta; Mike Dean; Twisco

The Weeknd singles chronology
"Rather Lie" (2025)	"Timeless" (remix) (2025)	"Hong Kong" (2026)

Playboi Carti singles chronology
"Rather Lie" (2025)	"Timeless" (remix) (2025)	"Backd00r" (2025)

Doechii singles chronology
"Anxiety" (2025)	"Timeless" (remix) (2025)	"Beat a Bitch Up" (2025)

A remix of "Timeless", featuring American rapper Doechii, was released on May 9, 2025. The remix was released as promotion for the film Hurry Up Tomorrow. The Weeknd's verse is missing from the remix, with only Playboi Carti's part remaining intact.

== Track listing ==
- Digital / streaming single
1. "Timeless" – 4:16
- Digital / streaming single
1. "Timeless" (remix) – 3:48
2. "Timeless" – 4:16
3. "Timeless" (instrumental) – 4:16
- 7-inch vinyl
1. "Timeless"
2. "Timeless" (instrumental)

== Credits and personnel ==
Credits adapted from Tidal.

- The Weeknd – vocals, songwriting, keyboard, associated performer
- Playboi Carti – vocals, songwriting
- Mike Dean – co-production, songwriting, mixing, synthesizer, mastering, studio personnel, associated performer
- Ojivolta – co-production, songwriting
- Pharrell Williams – production, songwriting, mixing, studio personnel
- Twisco – co-production, songwriting
- Gozshu - songwriting
- Devon "Lawson" Chisolm – songwriting
- Kobe "BbyKobe" Hood – songwriting
- Mark Williams (Oji) – songwriting
- Raul Cubina (Volta) – songwriting
- Tariq "BL$$D" Sharrieff – songwriting
- Tommy Rush – assistant mixing, studio personnel
- Sage Skolfield – co-mixing, engineering, studio personnel
- Mike Larson – engineering, studio personnel
- Marcus Fritz – vocal mixing, studio personnel

== Charts ==
=== Weekly charts ===
Weekly chart performance for "Timeless"
Chart (2024–2026)	Peak position
Australia (ARIA)	11
Australia Hip Hop/R&B (ARIA)	1
Austria (Ö3 Austria Top 40)	5
Belgium (Ultratop 50 Wallonia)	45
Canada Hot 100 (Billboard)	4
Canada CHR/Top 40 (Billboard)	39
Croatia (Billboard)	16
Czech Republic Singles Digital (ČNS IFPI)	14
Denmark (Tracklisten)	10
Finland (Suomen virallinen lista)	14
France (SNEP)	20
Germany (GfK)	8
Global 200 (Billboard)	8
Greece International (IFPI)	1
Honduras Anglo Airplay (Monitor Latino)	9
Hungary (Single Top 40)	17
Iceland (Tónlistinn)	9
India International (IMI)	1
Ireland (IRMA)	9
Israel (Mako Hitlist)	49
Italy (FIMI)	46
Japan Hot Overseas (Billboard Japan)	13
Latvia Streaming (LaIPA)	1
Lebanon (Lebanese Top 20)	18
Lithuania (AGATA)	2
Luxembourg (Billboard)	3
Malaysia (Billboard)	17
Malaysia International (RIM)	10
Middle East and North Africa (IFPI)	3
Netherlands (Single Top 100)	24
New Zealand (Recorded Music NZ)	4
Nigeria (TurnTable Top 100)	57
Norway (VG-lista)	3
Poland (Polish Streaming Top 100)	7
Portugal (AFP)	5
Romania (Billboard)	9
Saudi Arabia (IFPI)	8
Singapore (RIAS)	12
Slovakia Singles Digital (ČNS IFPI)	4
South Africa (TOSAC)	5
South Korea Download (Circle)	154
Spain (Promusicae)	72
Sweden (Sverigetopplistan)	17
Switzerland (Schweizer Hitparade)	2
Turkey International Airplay (Radiomonitor Türkiye)	4
UAE (IFPI)	2
UK Singles (Official Charts)	7
UK Hip Hop/R&B (Official Charts)	1
US Billboard Hot 100	3
US Dance Airplay (Billboard)	35
US Hot R&B/Hip-Hop Songs (Billboard)	1
US Pop Airplay (Billboard)	12
US R&B/Hip-Hop Airplay (Billboard)	7
US Rhythmic Airplay (Billboard)	1

=== Year-end charts ===
2024 year-end chart performance for "Timeless"
Chart (2024)	Position
Australia Hip Hop/R&B (ARIA)	44
Switzerland (Schweizer Hitparade)	90
US Hot R&B/Hip-Hop Songs (Billboard)	93

2025 year-end chart performance for "Timeless"
Chart (2025)	Position
Australia (ARIA)	31
Belgium (Ultratop 50 Flanders)	166
Belgium (Ultratop 50 Wallonia)	178
Canada (Canadian Hot 100)	22
France (SNEP)	132
Germany (GfK)	80
Global 200 (Billboard)	12
Hungary (Single Top 40)	66
Iceland (Tónlistinn)	49
India International (IMI)	4
New Zealand (Recorded Music NZ)	33
Poland (Polish Streaming Top 100)	84
Sweden (Sverigetopplistan)	92
Switzerland (Schweizer Hitparade)	34
UK Singles (OCC)	66
US Billboard Hot 100	16
US Hot R&B/Hip-Hop Songs (Billboard)	3
US Pop Airplay (Billboard)	39
US Rhythmic Airplay (Billboard)	3

== Certifications ==
Certifications for "Timeless"
Region	Certification	Certified units/sales
Australia (ARIA)	4× Platinum	280,000^{‡}
Austria (IFPI Austria)	Platinum	30,000^{‡}
Belgium (BRMA)	Gold	20,000^{‡}
Brazil (Pro-Música Brasil)	2× Diamond	320,000^{‡}
Canada (Music Canada)	7× Platinum	560,000^{‡}
Denmark (IFPI Danmark)	Platinum	90,000^{‡}
France (SNEP)	Diamond	333,333^{‡}
Germany (BVMI)	Gold	300,000^{‡}
Italy (FIMI)	Gold	100,000^{‡}
New Zealand (RMNZ)	2× Platinum	60,000^{‡}
Poland (ZPAV)	Platinum	125,000^{‡}
Portugal (AFP)	2× Platinum	20,000^{‡}
Spain (Promusicae)	Gold	30,000^{‡}
Switzerland (IFPI Switzerland)	Gold	15,000^{‡}
United Kingdom (BPI)	Platinum	600,000^{‡}
Streaming
Central America (CFC)	Gold	3,500,000^{†}
Greece (IFPI Greece)	3× Platinum	6,000,000^{†}
^{‡} Sales+streaming figures based on certification alone.^{†} Streaming-only figures based on certification alone.
