= F1lthy =

American record producer

- Born: Richard Ortiz; February 1, 1992 (age 34); Philadelphia, Pennsylvania, U.S.
- Genres: Hip hop; trap; rage
- Occupations: Record producer; songwriter
- Instrument: FL Studio
- Years active: 2012–present
- Member of: Working on Dying; Opium
- Website: f1lthyware.com

Richard Ortiz (born February 1, 1992), known professionally as F1lthy (stylized in all caps), is an American record producer and songwriter. He is a co-founder of the rap collective Working on Dying and a producer for many rappers such as Playboi Carti and Lil Yachty, and a member of Playboi Carti's Opium record label. He is known for "crafting sounds as guttural and crunchy as his name suggests," and minimalist melodies.

== Biography ==
Richard Ortiz was born in Philadelphia, Pennsylvania, on February 1, 1992. In 2012, Ortiz started beat-making, inspired by underground music culture at the time. His influences included SpaceGhostPurrp and Metro Zu.

Working with local artists as well as his younger brother Jordan "Oogie Mane" Ortiz, Ortiz co-founded the producer collective Working on Dying. Their breakthrough came in early 2014, after meeting Snob Mobb. He has worked extensively with artists in the underground/alternative rap scene such as Bladee, Lucki, and Black Kray.

In 2020, Ortiz gained mainstream recognition for producing Carti's second studio album, Whole Lotta Red, which peaked at number one on the Billboard 200 chart. He has also produced for names such as Ken Carson, Lil Yachty, Yeat, and Destroy Lonely.

== Discography ==
=== Collaborative albums ===
List of collaborative albums, with selected details
Title	Album details
Working on Dying 2 (with The Loosie Man)	Released: November 29, 2014; Label: Self-released; Formats: Digital download, streaming
Shitty Sickboy (with Black Kray - released under Sickboyrari)	Released: December 16, 2015; Label: Goth Money; Formats: Digital download, streaming, cassette tape
Wake Up Lucki (with Lucki)	Released: December 2, 2021; Label: Empire; Formats: Digital download, streaming

== Production discography ==
=== Albums ===
Year	Title	Artist	Chart positions										Certification
Year	Title	Artist	US	US R&B /HH	US RAP	AUS	BEL	CAN	GER	NZ	SWE	UK	Certification
2017	Working on Dying	Bladee	—	—	—	—	—	—	—	—	—	—	
2020	Whole Lotta Red	Playboi Carti	1	1	1	15	18	2	45	7	37	17	RIAA: Gold; BPI: Silver; IFPI Danmark: Gold; ZPAV: 2× Platnum
2021	Up 2 Me	Yeat	58	31	—	—	—	81	—	—	—	—	
2021	Wake Up Lucki	Lucki	—	—	—	—	—	—	—	—	—	—	
2022	2 Alive	Yeat	6	3	—	—	89	19	—	—	—	—	ZPAV: Gold
2022	X	Ken Carson	115	50	—	—	—	—	—	—	—	—	
2022	Her Loss	Drake and 21 Savage	1	1	—	2	4	1	6	2	2	1	RIAA: 2× Platinum; BPI: Gold; ARIA: Gold; MC: 2× Platinum; IFPI Danmark: Gold; FIMI: Gold; RMNZ: Gold; ZPAV: Gold
2023	Business is Business	Young Thug	2	1	—	36	30	2	22	7	—	15	
2023	A Great Chaos	Ken Carson	11	4	—	4	56	18	45	21	—	43	RIAA: Gold; MC: Gold; ZPAV: Gold
2023	The First Time	Kid Laroi	26	—	—	3	—	16	—	7	—	29	RIAA: Gold; ARIA: Gold; BPI: Silver; MC: Platnum; RMNZ: Gold
2023	Heaven Knows	PinkPantheress	61	—	—	98	102	59	—	30	—	28	MC: Gold
2024	Cold Visions	Bladee	—	—	—	—	—	—	—	—	—	—	
2025	Music	Playboi Carti	1	1	1	1	3	1	3	1	2	1	BPI: Silver; ZPAV: Gold
2025	More Chaos	Ken Carson	1	1	1	29	67	17	45	26	—	54	
"—" denotes releases that did not chart or were not released in that territory.
