= Playboi Carti discography =

Hip hop recording artist discography

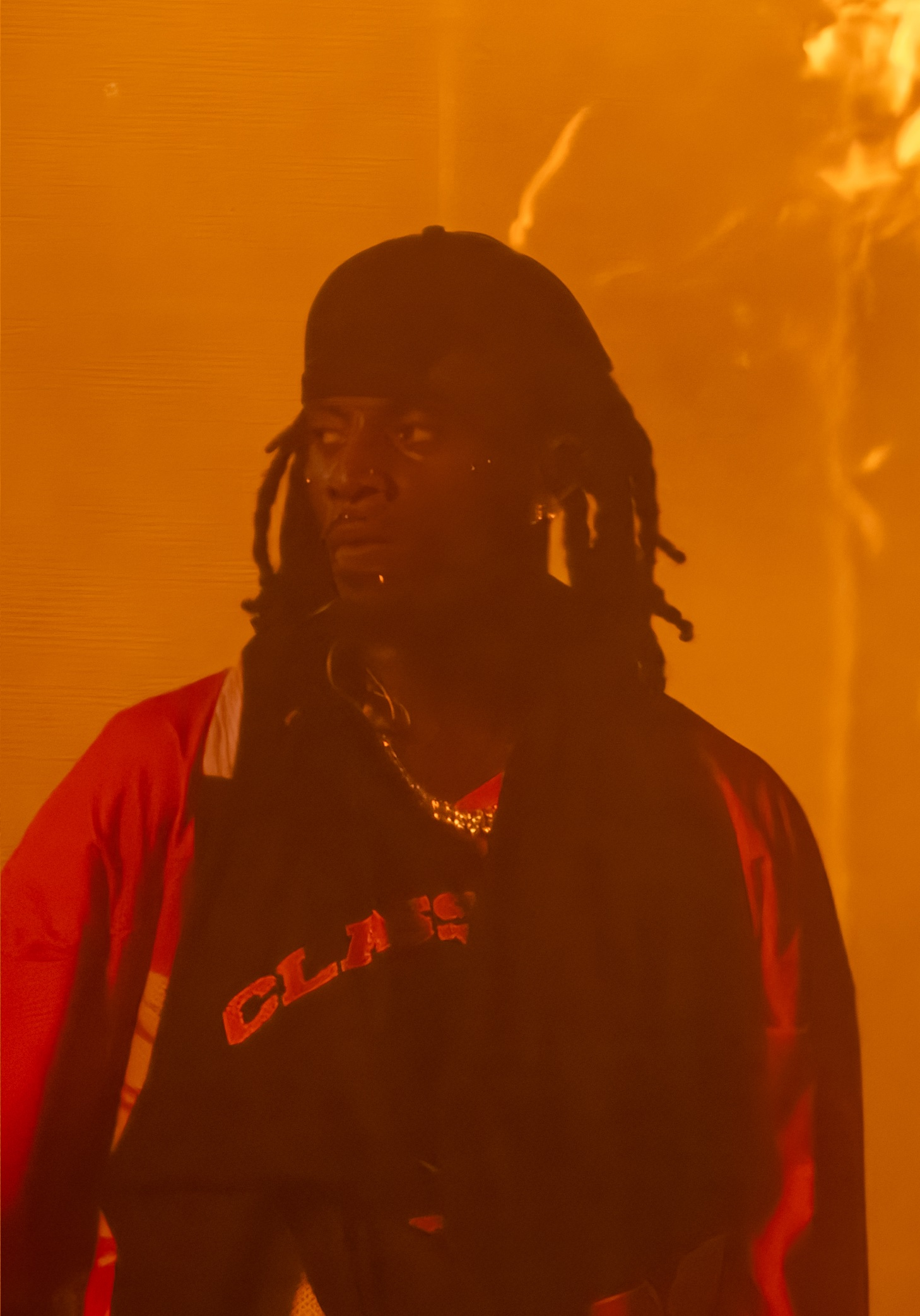
- Playboi Carti performing in 2024
- Studio albums: 3
- EPs: 1
- Mixtapes: 4
- Singles: 29
- Promotional singles: 7
- Music videos: 20

American rapper Playboi Carti has released three studio albums, four mixtapes, one extended play (EP), seven promotional singles, twenty-nine singles (including 11 as a featured artist), and twenty music videos. Under the alias Sir Cartier, he began his career by self-releasing three mixtapes: THC: The High Chronical (2011), Young Misfit (2012), and Sensation (2013). These early works marked his early activity in the underground rap scene. In 2015, Carti gained widespread attention with his singles "Broke Boi" and "Fetti" (featuring Dash and Maxo Kream), released on SoundCloud. After the release of "Fetti", he would release two additional songs, as part of his debut extended play, Death in Tune in May 2015. The releases contributed to his signing with Interscope Records and ASAP Rocky's AWGE imprint in 2016. His commercial breakthrough came in April 2017 with the release of his debut commercial self-titled mixtape. The mixtape peaked at number 12 on the US Billboard 200, driven by the success of the single "Magnolia", which reached number 29 on the Billboard Hot 100 and was certified eight-times platinum by the Recording Industry Association of America (RIAA). Another song from the mixtape, "Wokeuplikethis" (featuring Lil Uzi Vert), charted on the Hot R&B/Hip-Hop Songs chart.

Carti's debut studio album, Die Lit, was released in May 2018. It debuted at number three on the Billboard 200, earning 61,000 album-equivalent units in its first week. Praised for its innovative approach to trap music, the album included the platinum-certified track "Shoota", featuring Lil Uzi Vert, which peaked at number 46 on the Billboard Hot 100. Following a two-year hiatus, Carti returned with the single "@ Meh" in April 2020, which debuted at number 35 on the Billboard Hot 100. His second studio album, Whole Lotta Red, was released in December 2020. It debuted at number one on the Billboard 200 with 100,000 album-equivalent units in its first week, becoming Carti's first number one album. The album featured notable tracks such as "Go2DaMoon" featuring Kanye West, which peaked at number 30 on the Hot R&B/Hip-Hop Songs chart, and "Sky", which gained widespread acclaim and popularity.

In May 2021, Carti collaborated alongside Trippie Redd on the single "Miss the Rage", which debuted at number 11 on the Billboard Hot 100 and earned platinum certification. Later that year, he appeared on Kanye West's "Off the Grid" alongside Fivio Foreign, a track from West's Donda, that was met with positive reception. In February 2024, Carti collaborated with Kanye West and Ty Dolla Sign on the single "Carnival", alongside Rich the Kid. The track, part of the collaborative album Vultures 1, marked Carti's first number-one song on the Billboard Hot 100. Carti's third studio album, Music, was released in March 2025 and debuted atop the US Billboard 200, earning 298,000 album-equivalent units in its first week. The album became his second consecutive number-one record on the Billboard 200. Supported by promotional singles such as "K Pop", "HBA", and "Evil J0rdan", all 30 songs on the album simultaneously debuted on the Billboard Hot 100, making him the first rapper and third artist overall to do so, joining Taylor Swift and Morgan Wallen. Music has the record for the most streamed rap album in one day in 2025 with 134 million streams, becoming the seventh-most streamed album in a single day. A deluxe edition of the album, titled Music - Sorry 4 Da Wait, was released in March 2025, featuring four additional tracks.

== Studio albums ==
List of studio albums, with selected chart positions, sales figures and certifications
Title	Album details	Peak chart positions										Sales	Certifications
Title	Album details	US	US R&B /HH	US Rap	AUS	BEL	CAN	GER	NZ	SWE	UK	Sales	Certifications
Die Lit	Released: May 11, 2018; Label: AWGE, Interscope; Format: LP, digital download, streaming	3	2	2	49	41	9	—	27	—	27	US: 5,000	RIAA: Gold; BPI: Gold
Whole Lotta Red	Released: December 25, 2020; Label: AWGE, Interscope; Format: CD, LP, digital download, streaming	1	1	1	15	18	2	45	7	37	17	US: 10,000	RIAA: Gold; BPI: Gold
Music	Released: March 14, 2025; Label: AWGE, Interscope; Format: CD, LP, digital download, streaming	1	1	1	1	3	1	3	1	2	1	US: 103,000 (Note: In 2025, the album sold 103,000 pure copies.)	RIAA: Platinum; BPI: Gold
"—" denotes a recording that did not chart or was not released in that territory.

== Mixtapes ==
List of mixtapes, with selected chart positions, sales figures and certifications
Title	Mixtape details	Peak chart positions				Sales	Certifications
Title	Mixtape details	US	US R&B/ HH	US Rap	CAN	Sales	Certifications
THC: The High Chronicals (as Sir Cartier)	Released: November 5, 2011; Label: Self-released; Format: Digital download	—	—	—	—		
Young Misfit (as Sir Cartier)	Released: November 12, 2012; Label: Self-released; Format: Digital download	—	—	—	—		
Playboi Carti	Released: April 14, 2017; Label: AWGE, Interscope; Format: CD, LP, digital download, streaming	12	7	6	28	US: 7,000	RIAA: Platinum; BPI: Silver
"—" denotes a recording that did not chart or was not released in that territory.

== Extended plays ==
List of extended plays
Title	EP details
Death in Tune	Released: May 13, 2015; Label: Self-released; Format: Digital download, streaming

== Singles ==
=== As lead artist ===
List of singles as lead artist, with selected chart positions and certifications, showing year released and album name
Title	Year	Peak chart positions										Certifications	Album
Title	Year	US	US R&B/HH	US Rap	AUS	CAN	FRA	IRE	NZ	UK	WW	Certifications	Album
"Florida Boy*"	2009	—	—	—	—	—	—	—	—	—	—		Non-album singles
"3 Chains" (with Rich the Kid)	2016	—	—	—	—	—	—	—	—	—	—		Non-album singles
"No Pressure" (with Rich the Kid)	2016	—	—	—	—	—	—	—	—	—	—		Non-album singles
"Word to Yams"	2016	—	—	—	—	—	—	—	—	—	—		Non-album singles
"Broke Boi"	2017	—	—	—	—	—	—	—	—	—	—		Non-album singles
"Lookin'" (featuring Lil Uzi Vert)	2017	—	—	—	—	—	—	—	—	—	—	RIAA: Gold	Playboi Carti
"Wokeuplikethis" (featuring Lil Uzi Vert)	2017	76	32	25	—	—	—	—	—	—	—	RIAA: 2× Platinum; BPI: Silver; MC: Gold; RMNZ: Platinum	Playboi Carti
"Magnolia"	2017	29	11	7	—	51	—	—	—	—	—	RIAA: 8× Platinum; BPI: Platinum; MC: 2× Platinum; RMNZ: 2× Platinum; SNEP: Gold	Playboi Carti
"Let It Go"	2017	—	—	—	—	—	—	—	—	—	—		Playboi Carti
"Crumbs" (with DRAM)	2017	—	—	—	—	—	—	—	—	—	—		Non-album singles
"In the Lobby" (with Sosamann)	2018	—	—	—	—	—	—	—	—	—	—		Non-album singles
"All of Them" (with Rich the Kid)	2018	—	—	—	—	—	—	—	—	—	—		Non-album singles
"@ Meh"	2020	35	17	14	—	27	197	32	34	51	—		Non-album singles
"Miss the Rage" (with Trippie Redd)	2021	11	6	4	31	15	132	28	18	32	13	RIAA: Platinum; BPI: Silver; MC: 2× Platinum; RMNZ: Platinum	Trip at Knight
"Popular" (with the Weeknd and Madonna)	2023	43	14	—	8	10	77	15	6	10	20	RIAA: Platinum; ARIA: 3× Platinum; BPI: Platinum; RMNZ: 2× Platinum; SNEP: Platinum	The Highlights (Deluxe)
"Type Shit" (with Future, Metro Boomin, and Travis Scott)	2024	2	2	2	29	8	91	26	23	18	6	ARIA: Gold; BPI: Silver; MC: 2× Platinum; RMNZ: Gold	We Don't Trust You
"All Red"	2024	15	3	2	54	17	156	43	20	32	16		Non-album single
"Timeless" (with the Weeknd)	2024	3	1	—	11	4	20	9	4	7	8	ARIA: 4× Platinum; BPI: Platinum; MC: 2× Platinum; RMNZ: Platinum; SNEP: Gold	Hurry Up Tomorrow
"Rather Lie" (with the Weeknd)	2025	4	3	3	16	9	59	—	7	10	6	RIAA: Platinum; RMNZ: Gold	Music
"Backd00r" (featuring Kendrick Lamar and Jhené Aiko)	2025	25	11	10	61	36	139	—	36	— (Note: "Backd00r" did not enter the UK Singles Chart, as chart rules only allow three songs per artist to chart within the top 100 at a time, but peaked at number 62 on the UK Streaming Chart.)	25		Music
"—" denotes a recording that did not chart or was not released in that territory.

=== As featured artist ===
List of singles as featured artist, with selected chart positions and certifications, showing year released and album name
Title	Year	Peak chart positions										Certifications	Album
Title	Year	US	US R&B/HH	US Rap	AUS	CAN	FRA	IRE	NZ	UK	WW	Certifications	Album
"Action" (Joey Fatts featuring Playboi Carti and ASAP Nast)	2016	—	—	—	—	—	—	—	—	—	—		Non-album single
"Telephone Calls" (ASAP Mob featuring ASAP Rocky, Tyler, the Creator, Playboi Carti, and Yung Gleesh)	2016	—	— (Note: "Telephone Calls" did not enter the Billboard Hot R&B/Hip-Hop Songs chart, but peaked at number ten on the Bubbling Under R&B/Hip-Hop Singles chart.)	—	—	—	—	—	—	—	—	RIAA: Gold	Cozy Tapes Vol. 1: Friends
"Raf" (ASAP Mob featuring ASAP Rocky, Playboi Carti, Quavo, Lil Uzi Vert, and Frank Ocean)	2017	— (Note: "RAF" did not chart on the Billboard Hot 100, though did peak at number 18 on the Bubbling Under Hot 100 chart.)	— (Note: "RAF" did not enter the Billboard Hot R&B/Hip-Hop Songs chart, but peaked at number nine on the Bubbling Under R&B/Hip-Hop Singles chart.)	—	—	82	—	—	—	—	—	RIAA: Platinum; ARIA: Gold; RMNZ: Gold	Cozy Tapes Vol. 2: Too Cozy
"Summer Bummer" (Lana Del Rey featuring ASAP Rocky and Playboi Carti)	2017	— (Note: "Summer Bummer" did not chart on the Billboard Hot 100, though did peak at number 23 on the Bubbling Under Hot 100 chart.)	—	—	—	80	—	—	—	81	—	RIAA: Gold; ARIA: Gold	Lust for Life
"Yo Pi'erre!" (Pi'erre Bourne featuring Playboi Carti)	2017	—	—	—	—	—	—	—	—	—	—		Non-album singles
"Unlock It" (Abra and Boys Noize featuring Playboi Carti)	2021	—	—	—	—	—	—	—	—	—	—		Non-album singles
"Off the Grid" (Kanye West featuring Playboi Carti and Fivio Foreign)	2021	11	4	4	9	7	44	11	7	15	7	RIAA: Platinum; MC: Gold; BPI: Silver	Donda
"Carnival" (Kanye West and Ty Dolla Sign as ¥$ and Rich the Kid featuring Playboi Carti)	2024	1	1	1	10	2	119	18	7	5	2	RIAA: 2× Platinum; RMNZ: Platinum; BPI: Gold	Vultures 1
"Fein" (Travis Scott featuring Playboi Carti)	2024	5	2	2	7	6	11	14	6	13	3	RIAA: 3× Platinum; ARIA: 2× Platinum; BPI: Gold; MC: 4× Platinum; SNEP: Platinum	Utopia
"I Luv It" (Camila Cabello featuring Playboi Carti)	2024	81	—	—	—	66	—	64	— (Note: "I Luv It" did not enter the NZ Top 40 Singles Chart, but peaked at number 9 on the NZ Hot Singles Chart.)	61	90		C,XOXO
"Blick Sum" (Latto featuring Playboi Carti)	2025	— (Note: "Blick Sum" did not chart on the Billboard Hot 100, though did peak at number two on the Bubbling Under Hot 100 chart.)	32	18	—	—	—	—	— (Note: "Blick Sum" did not enter the NZ Top 40 Singles Chart, but peaked at number 20 on the NZ Hot Singles Chart.)	—	—		Sugar Honey Iced Tea
"Smaxk or Die" (Fatt Smaxk featuring Playboi Carti)	2026	—	—	—	—	—	—	—	—	—	—		Non-album single
"—" denotes a recording that did not chart or was not released in that territory.

=== Promotional singles ===
List of promotional singles, with selected chart positions, showing year released and album name
Title	Year	Peak chart positions									Certifications	Album
Title	Year	US	US R&B/HH	US Rap	AUS	CAN	FRA	NZ	UK	WW	Certifications	Album
"Love Hurts" (featuring Travis Scott)	2018	— (Note: "Love Hurts" did not chart on the Billboard Hot 100, though did peak at number 15 on the Bubbling Under Hot 100 chart.)	— (Note: "Love Hurts" did not enter the Billboard Hot R&B/Hip-Hop Songs chart, but peaked at number eight on the Bubbling Under R&B/Hip-Hop Singles chart.)	—	—	—	—	—	—	—		Die Lit
"Different Day"	2023	—	—	—	—	—	—	— (Note: "Different Day" did not enter the NZ Top 40 Singles Chart, but peaked at number 34 on the NZ Hot Singles Chart.)	—	—		Music – Sorry 4 da Wait
"2024"	2023	—	—	—	—	—	—	— (Note: "2024" did not enter the NZ Top 40 Singles Chart, but peaked at number 18 on the NZ Hot Singles Chart.)	—	—		Music – Sorry 4 da Wait
"HBA"	2023	48	23	21	82	52	—	—	—	55		Music
"Backr00ms" (with Travis Scott)	2024	—	—	—	—	—	—	— (Note: "Backr00ms" did not enter the NZ Top 40 Singles Chart, but peaked at number 23 on the NZ Hot Singles Chart.)	—	—		Music – Sorry 4 da Wait
"Evil J0rdan"	2024	2	2	2	7	4	42	5	7	4	RIAA: Platinum	Music
"K Pop"	2024	38	18	16	73	50	195	—	— (Note: "K Pop" did not enter the UK Singles Chart, as chart rules only allow three songs per artist to chart within the top 100 at a time, but peaked at number 77 on the UK Streaming Chart.)	35		Music
"—" denotes a recording that did not chart or was not released in that territory.

== Other charted and certified songs ==
List of other charted and certified songs, with selected chart positions and certifications, showing year released and album name
Title	Year	Peak chart positions										Certifications	Album
Title	Year	US	US R&B/HH	US Rap	AUS	CAN	FRA	IRE	NZ	UK	WW	Certifications	Album
"Location"	2017	—	—	—	—	—	—	—	—	—	—	BPI: Silver; RMNZ: Platinum	Playboi Carti
"New Choppa" (featuring ASAP Rocky)	2017	—	—	—	—	—	—	—	—	—	—	RIAA: Gold	Playboi Carti
"Minute" (Nav and Metro Boomin featuring Playboi Carti and Offset)	2017	— (Note: "Minute" did not chart on the Billboard Hot 100, though did peak at number 21 on the Bubbling Under Hot 100 chart.)	— (Note: "Minute" did not enter the Billboard Hot R&B/Hip-Hop Songs chart, but peaked at number four on the Bubbling Under R&B/Hip-Hop Singles chart.)	—	—	76	—	—	—	—	—	RIAA: Platinum; MC: Platinum	Perfect Timing
"Shoota" (featuring Lil Uzi Vert)	2018	46	25	19	—	67	—	—	—	—	—	RIAA: Platinum; BPI: Silver; RMNZ: Platinum	Die Lit
"Poke It Out" (with Nicki Minaj)	2018	— (Note: "Poke It Out" did not chart on the Billboard Hot 100, though did peak at number 13 on the Bubbling Under Hot 100 chart.)	— (Note: "Poke It Out" did not enter the Billboard Hot R&B/Hip-Hop Songs chart, but peaked at number six on the Bubbling Under R&B/Hip-Hop Singles chart.)	—	—	—	—	—	—	—	—		Die Lit
"Fell In Luv" (featuring Bryson Tiller)	2018	—	—	—	—	—	—	—	—	—	—	BPI: Silver; RMNZ: Gold	Die Lit
"Long Time (Intro)"	2018	—	—	—	—	—	—	—	—	—	—	BPI: Silver; RMNZ: Gold	Die Lit
"R.I.P."	2018	—	—	—	—	—	—	—	—	—	—	BPI: Silver; RMNZ: Gold	Die Lit
"Get Dripped" (Lil Yachty featuring Playboi Carti)	2018	98	49	—	—	—	—	—	—	—	—	RIAA: Platinum	Nuthin' 2 Prove
"Same Yung Nigga" (Gunna featuring Playboi Carti)	2019	97	45	—	—	—	—	—	—	—	—	RIAA: Gold	Drip or Drown 2
"Baguettes in the Face" (Mustard featuring Nav, Playboi Carti, and A Boogie wit da Hoodie)	2019	81	33	—	—	47	—	—	—	—	—	RIAA: Platinum; BPI: Silver; RMNZ: Platinum	Perfect Ten
"They Afraid of You" (Trippie Redd featuring Playboi Carti)	2019	— (Note: "They Afraid of You" did not enter the Billboard Hot 100, but peaked at number 21 on the Bubbling Under Hot 100 chart.)	—	—	—	—	—	—	—	—	—		!
"Pain 1993" (Drake featuring Playboi Carti)	2020	7	6	4	—	7	50	15	17	17	—	ARIA: Gold; BPI: Silver; RMNZ: Gold	Dark Lane Demo Tapes
"Flex Up" (with Lil Yachty and Future)	2020	— (Note: "Flex Up" did not chart on the Billboard Hot 100, though did peak at number 11 on the Bubbling Under Hot 100 chart.)	37	—	—	—	—	—	—	—	—	RIAA: Gold	Lil Boat 3.5
"Rockstar Made"	2020	— (Note: "Rockstar Made" did not chart on the Billboard Hot 100, though did peak at number two on the Bubbling Under Hot 100 chart.)	40	—	—	—	—	—	—	—	—		Whole Lotta Red
"Go2DaMoon" (featuring Kanye West)	2020	82	30	24	—	86	—	—	—	—	150		Whole Lotta Red
"Stop Breathing"	2020	— (Note: "Stop Breathing" did not chart on the Billboard Hot 100, though did peak at number nine on the Bubbling Under Hot 100 chart.)	46	—	—	—	—	—	—	—	—		Whole Lotta Red
"Beno!"	2020	— (Note: "Beno!" did not chart on the Billboard Hot 100, though did peak at number four on the Bubbling Under Hot 100 chart.)	42	—	—	—	—	—	—	—	—		Whole Lotta Red
"M3tamorphosis" (featuring Kid Cudi)	2020	90	37	—	—	90	—	—	—	—	—		Whole Lotta Red
"Slay3r"	2020	72	25	—	—	67	—	—	—	—	116		Whole Lotta Red
"New Tank"	2020	— (Note: "New Tank" did not chart on the Billboard Hot 100, though did peak at number 12 on the Bubbling Under Hot 100 chart.)	—	—	—	—	—	—	—	—	—		Whole Lotta Red
"Teen X" (featuring Future)	2020	— (Note: "Teen X" did not chart on the Billboard Hot 100, though did peak at number 18 on the Bubbling Under Hot 100 chart.)	—	—	—	—	—	—	—	—	—		Whole Lotta Red
"Vamp Anthem"	2020	90	32	—	—	96	—	—	—	—	190	RMNZ: Gold	Whole Lotta Red
"New N3on"	2020	92	33	—	—	—	—	—	—	—	196		Whole Lotta Red
"Control"	2020	— (Note: "Control" did not chart on the Billboard Hot 100, though did peak at number 23 on the Bubbling Under Hot 100 chart.)	—	—	—	—	—	—	—	—	—		Whole Lotta Red
"Place"	2020	— (Note: "Place" did not chart on the Billboard Hot 100, though did peak at number six on the Bubbling Under Hot 100 chart.)	44	—	—	—	—	—	—	—	—		Whole Lotta Red
"Sky"	2020	— (Note: "Sky" did not chart on the Billboard Hot 100, though did peak at number four on the Bubbling Under Hot 100 chart.)	34	23	—	78	—	—	—	—	—	BPI: Gold; RMNZ: Platinum	Whole Lotta Red
"Over"	2020	— (Note: "Over" did not chart on the Billboard Hot 100, though did peak at number seven on the Bubbling Under Hot 100 chart.)	45	—	—	—	—	—	—	—	—		Whole Lotta Red
"ILoveUIHateU"	2020	— (Note: "ILoveUIHateU" did not chart on the Billboard Hot 100, though did peak at number three on the Bubbling Under Hot 100 chart.)	41	—	—	—	—	—	—	—	—	BPI: Silver; RMNZ: Gold	Whole Lotta Red
"Junya" (Kanye West featuring Playboi Carti)	2021	16	6	6	30	16	132	—	—	—	—		Donda
"Fuk Sumn" (Kanye West and Ty Dolla Sign as ¥$ featuring Playboi Carti and Travis Scott)	2024	23	10	7	33	17	181	—	—	— (Note: "Fuk Sum" did not enter the UK Singles Chart, as chart rules only allow three songs per artist to chart within the top one hundred at a time, but peaked at number 39 on the UK Streaming Chart.)	13		Vultures 1
"Field Trip" (with Kanye West and Ty Dolla Sign as ¥$ and Don Toliver featuring Kodak Black)	2024	48	10	8	88	41	—	—	—	65	33		Vultures 2
"Pop Out"	2025	41	19	17	70	54	173	—	—	— (Note: "Pop Out" did not enter the UK Singles Chart, as chart rules only allow three songs per artist to chart within the top 100 at a time, but peaked at number 75 on the UK Streaming Chart.)	37		Music
"Crush" (with Travis Scott)	2025	20	8	8	29	26	83	—	19	— (Note: "Crush" did not enter the UK Singles Chart, as chart rules only allow three songs per artist to chart within the top 100 at a time, but peaked at number 40 on the UK Streaming Chart.)	17		Music
"Mojo Jojo"	2025	27	13	11	60	37	140	—	—	— (Note: "Mojo Jojo" did not enter the UK Singles Chart, as chart rules only allow three songs per artist to chart within the top 100 at a time, but peaked at number 67 on the UK Streaming Chart.)	26		Music
"Philly" (with Travis Scott)	2025	28	14	12	49	32	125	—	35	— (Note: "Philly" did not enter the UK Singles Chart, as chart rules only allow three songs per artist to chart within the top 100 at a time, but peaked at number 64 on the UK Streaming Chart.)	24		Music
"Radar"	2025	43	20	18	83	53	175	—	—	— (Note: "Radar" did not enter the UK Singles Chart, as chart rules only allow three songs per artist to chart within the top 100 at a time, but peaked at number 92 on the UK Streaming Chart.)	40		Music
"Fine Shit"	2025	33	16	14	78	47	—	—	—	— (Note: "Fine Shit" did not enter the UK Singles Chart, as chart rules only allow three songs per artist to chart within the top 100 at a time, but peaked at number 83 on the UK Streaming Chart.)	36		Music
"Toxic" (with Skepta)	2025	34	17	15	46	46	178	—	27	21	32	RIAA: Gold; RMNZ: Gold	Music
"Munyun"	2025	69	33	—	—	72	—	—	—	—	81		Music
"Crank"	2025	55	28	—	—	66	—	—	—	—	67		Music
"Charge Dem Hoes a Fee" (with Future and Travis Scott)	2025	49	24	22	—	58	—	—	—	—	58		Music
"Good Credit" (with Kendrick Lamar)	2025	17	7	7	50	31	162	—	31	— (Note: "Good Credit" did not enter the UK Singles Chart, as chart rules only allow three songs per artist to chart within the top 100 at a time, but peaked at number 56 on the UK Streaming Chart.)	20	RIAA: Gold	Music
"I Seeeeee You Baby Boi"	2025	54	27	25	—	62	—	—	—	—	61		Music
"Wake Up F1lthy" (with Travis Scott)	2025	52	25	23	87	55	—	—	—	— (Note: "Wake Up F1lthy" did not enter the UK Singles Chart, as chart rules only allow three songs per artist to chart within the top 100 at a time, but peaked at number 94 on the UK Streaming Chart.)	51		Music
"Jumpin" (with Lil Uzi Vert)	2025	53	26	24	—	65	—	—	—	—	71		Music
"Trim" (with Future)	2025	46	22	20	—	59	—	—	—	—	60		Music
"Cocaine Nose"	2025	80	40	—	—	74	—	—	—	—	88		Music
"We Need All Da Vibes" (with Young Thug and Ty Dolla Sign)	2025	71	34	—	—	63	—	—	—	—	74		Music
"Olympian"	2025	65	32	—	—	70	—	—	—	—	84		Music
"Opm Babi"	2025	75	36	—	—	79	—	—	—	—	100		Music
"Twin Trim" (with Lil Uzi Vert)	2025	58	30	—	—	68	—	—	—	—	86		Music
"Like Weezy"	2025	56	26	—	—	69	—	—	—	—	87		Music
"Dis 1 Got It"	2025	85	43	—	—	93	—	—	—	—	151		Music
"Walk"	2025	96	48	—	—	—	—	—	—	—	—		Music
"Overly"	2025	86	44	—	—	99	—	—	—	—	176		Music
"South Atlanta Baby"	2025	88	45	—	—	—	—	—	—	—	178		Music
"FOMDJ"	2025	— (Note: "FOMDJ" did not chart on the Billboard Hot 100, though did peak at number six on the Bubbling Under Hot 100 chart.)	35	—	—	—	—	—	— (Note: "FOMDJ" did not enter the NZ Top 40 Singles Chart, but peaked at number 20 on the NZ Hot Singles Chart.)	—	—		Music
"Unlimited" (Nav featuring Playboi Carti)	2025	—	—	—	—	—	—	—	— (Note: "Unlimited" did not enter the NZ Top 40 Singles Chart, but peaked at number 26 on the NZ Hot Singles Chart.)	—	—		OMW2 Rexdale
"Off the Meter" (with Ken Carson and Destroy Lonely)	2025	— (Note: "Off the Meter" did not chart on the Billboard Hot 100, though did peak at number 11 on the Bubbling Under Hot 100 chart.)	26	17	—	—	—	—	— (Note: "Off the Meter" did not enter the NZ Top 40 Singles Chart, but peaked at number 13 on the NZ Hot Singles Chart.)	—	—		More Chaos
"Where Was You" (with Travis Scott and Future)	2025	74	25	13	—	77	—	—	—	—	107		JackBoys 2
"Fire Your Manager" (with YoungBoy Never Broke Again)	2025	— (Note: "Fire Your Manager" did not chart on the Billboard Hot 100, though it did peak at number 11 on the Bubbling Under Hot 100 chart.)	34	20	—	—	—	—	— (Note: "Fire Your Manager" did not enter the NZ Top 40 Singles Chart, but peaked at number 26 on the NZ Hot Singles Chart.)	—	—		MASA
"Let's Do It" (with Lil Baby and Skooly)	2025	71	10	6	—	—	—	—	— (Note: "Let's Do It" did not chart on the NZ Top 40 Singles Chart, but peaked at number 12 on the NZ Hot Singles Chart.)	—	—		The Leaks
"—" denotes a recording that did not chart or was not released in that territory.

== Guest appearances ==
List of guest appearances, with other artists, showing year released and album name
Title	Year	Artist(s)	Album
"Fefe"	2014	Pollari	Fiji Spring
"Iknowuknow"	2014	Ethereal	Cactus Jack
"Beef"	2015	Ethereal	—N/a
"4 The People"	2015	Ethereal	—N/a
"Peepin'"	2015	Gucci Mane, 21 Savage	—N/a
"4Tspoon"	2015	Yung Bans	
"Fake AF" (Remix)	2015	Father	Papicodone
"Come Here!"	2015	Ethereal	Final Fantasy
"2Door"	2015	TrapMoneyBenny, LAMB$	Trap Money Benny
"Plug"	2015	Rich the Kid, Kodak Black	Trap Talk
"Dem Callin'"	2015	Ramriddlz	—N/a
"Freestyle / 4 The People"	2015	Ethereal	—N/a
"Snow"	2015	Kewbrik, Dantes	—N/a
"Ghost"	2015	Key!	Martin Luther Key!
"Left Right"	2016	Lil Uzi Vert	—N/a
"Dallas"	2016	Joey Fatts	I'll Call You Tomorrow
"Hard to Breathe"	2016	Cash Out	—N/a
"Party Song"	2016	Reese	Before the Universe
"Spike Lee"	2016	Maxo Kream, Rich the Kid	The Persona Tape
"No Pressure"	2016	Rich the Kid	Rich Forever
"Booted Up"	2016	DJ Twin, Sean Kingston	Day 1
"Speedy Gonzales"	2016	Justin Rose	Water White
"Of Course We Ghetto Flowers"	2016	Lil Uzi Vert, Offset	The Perfect LUV Tape
"London Town"	2016	ASAP Mob, ASAP Rocky, ASAP Ant	Cozy Tapes Vol. 1: Friends
"Lil Pill"	2016	Famous Dex	Different
"Str8 Up"	2016	Rich the Kid, Famous Dex	Keep Flexin
"Scorin'"	2016	Murda Beatz, Offset	Keep God First
"YSL"	2017	Gunna	Drip Season 2
"Green & Purple"	2017	Travis Scott	—N/a
"Minute"	2017	Nav, Metro Boomin, Offset	Perfect Timing
"Mad Man"	2017	ASAP Ferg	Still Striving
"The Mattress" (Remix)	2017	ASAP Ferg, ASAP Rocky, Rich the Kid, Famous Dex	Still Striving
"Perry Aye"	2017	ASAP Mob, ASAP Rocky, ASAP Nast, Jaden Smith	Cozy Tapes Vol. 2: Too Cozy
"Blowin' Minds (Skateboard)"	2017	ASAP Mob, ASAP Rocky, ASAP Nast, ASAP Ant, Chief Keef	Cozy Tapes Vol. 2: Too Cozy
"Walk on Water"	2017	ASAP Mob, ASAP Twelvyy, ASAP Ant, ASAP Nast, ASAP Ferg	Cozy Tapes Vol. 2: Too Cozy
"Get the Bag"	2017	ASAP Mob, ASAP Rocky, ASAP Ferg, ASAP Ant, ASAP Nast, ASAP TyY, Smooky MarGielaa	Cozy Tapes Vol. 2: Too Cozy
"Frat Rules"	2017	ASAP Mob, ASAP Rocky, Big Sean	Cozy Tapes Vol. 2: Too Cozy
"FYBR (First Year Being Rich)"	2017	ASAP Mob, ASAP Twelvyy, ASAP Rocky, ASAP Ant, ASAP Ferg, Key!	Cozy Tapes Vol. 2: Too Cozy
"What Happens"	2017	ASAP Mob, ASAP Rocky, ASAP Ferg, ASAP Twelvyy, Joey Badass, Kirk Knight, Nyck Caution, Meechy Darko, Zombie Juice	Cozy Tapes Vol. 2: Too Cozy
"Check"	2017	Hoodrich Pablo Juan	Designer Drugz 3
"Vlone Thug"	2017	MilanMakesBeats, UnoTheActivist	Wave 1
"Still Kickin' / On Go"	2017	MilanMakesBeats, Thouxanbanfauni	Wave 1
"Butterfly Coupe"	2017	MilanMakesBeats, Yung Bans	Wave 1
"100 Rounds Remix"	2017	SG Tip, YoungBoy Never Broke Again	—N/a
"Crumbs"	2017	DRAM	Big Baby DRAM (Deluxe Version)
"Hit a Lick"	2017	Harry Fraud	The Coast
"Ain't Doin' That"	2018	Young Sizzle	Trap Ye: Season 2
"Buck Shots"	2018	ASAP Rocky, Smooky MarGielaa, Kelvin Krash	Testing
"Beam"	2018	Rich Brian	Head in the Clouds
"Uh Uh"	2018	Chief Keef	Mansion Musick
"Top 5"	2018	Kap G	No Kap
"Houdini"	2018	Travis Scott	—N/a
"Get Dripped"	2018	Lil Yachty	Nuthin' 2 Prove
"Same Yung Nigga"	2019	Gunna	Drip or Drown 2
"Almeda"	2019	Solange	When I Get Home
"Ciggy Said Light"	2019	92Jack	—N/a
"Baguettes in the Face"	2019	Mustard, Nav, A Boogie wit da Hoodie	Perfect Ten
"They Afraid of You"	2019	Trippie Redd	!
"Want My M's REMIX"	2019	Kap G, Lil Durk, Gunna	—N/a
"100 Racks"	2019	Quality Control, Offset	Control the Streets, Volume 2
"Paid in Full"	2019	Safe	Stay
"Earfquake"	2019	Tyler, the Creator	Igor
"What Type of Shit You On"	2019	YRN Murk	—N/a
"Pain 1993"	2020	Drake	Dark Lane Demo Tapes
"Flex Up"	2020	Lil Yachty, Future	Lil Boat 3.5
"Homixide"	2021	Lil 1 DTE	Lil 1 DTE
"Switching Lanes"	2021	Pi'erre Bourne	The Life of Pi'erre 5
"Unlock It"	2021	ABRA	—N/a
"Junya"	2021	Kanye West	Donda
"Junya Pt 2"	2021	Kanye West	Donda
"Fuk Sumn"	2024	¥$ (Kanye West and Ty Dolla Sign), Travis Scott	Vultures 1
"Field Trip"	2024	¥$ (Kanye West and Ty Dolla Sign), Don Toliver, Kodak Black	Vultures 2
"Unlimited"	2025	Nav	OMW2 Rexdale
"Off the Meter"	2025	Ken Carson, Destroy Lonely	More Chaos
"Where Was You"	2025	Travis Scott, Future	JackBoys 2
"Fire Your Manager"	2025	YoungBoy Never Broke Again	MASA
"Let's Do It"	2025	Lil Baby, Skooly	The Leaks
Smaxk or Die (Remix)	2026	Fatt Smaxk	—N/a
"Deaf Note"	2026	Ken Carson	Xperiment
"WeDidIt"	2026	Ken Carson	Xperiment

== Music videos ==
List of music videos, showing year released and director
Title	Year	Director(s)
"Fetti" (featuring Dash and Maxo Kream)	2015	Bird Medina
"Talk"	2015	Quinton Dominguez
"Talk (ICYTWAT Remix)"	2015	Nassacre
"Broke Boi"	2015	InTheSkyWDMDS and Nef Film
"What" (with UnoTheActivist)	2016	AWGE
"Magnolia"	2017	Hidji Films
"Wokeuplikethis" (featuring Lil Uzi Vert)	2017	James "JMP" Pereira
"New Choppa" (featuring ASAP Rocky)	2017	Unknown
"R.I.P."	2018	Playboi Carti and Nick Walker
"@ Meh"	2020	Playboi Carti and Nick Walker
"M3tamorphosis" (featuring Kid Cudi)	2020	Nico Ballesteros
"Sky"	2021	Nick Walker
"Different Day"	2023	Yung Tacc
"2024"	2023	LouieKnows
"HBA"	2023	LouieKnows and Joy Divizn
"Backr00ms" (featuring Travis Scott)	2024	SexIsDeath and Indiana420Bitch
"Evil J0rdan"	2024	LouieKnows
"K Pop"	2024	Notmanagedbyme
"Like Weezy"	2025	Joy Divizn
"FOMDJ"	2025	Gab3 and Miles Henrik Hall
