= Ojivolta =

American music production duo

- Origin: New York City, United States
- Genres: Hip hop; pop; alternative rock
- Occupations: Record producers; songwriters
- Years active: 2015–present
- Members: Mark Williams; Raul Cubina

Ojivolta is an American record production and songwriting duo, composed of Mark "Oji" Williams and Raul "Volta" Cubina. Their credits include production and co-writing for Kanye West, The Weeknd, Playboi Carti (Ojivolta hosted his album Music), XXXTentacion, Lil Nas X, Justin Bieber, Jon Bellion, and Halsey, among others.

== Discography ==
Title	Year	Artist(s)	Album	Credits	Written with	Produced with
"All Time Low"	2015	Jon Bellion	The Human Condition	Co-writer	Travis Mendes & Jon Bellion	—
“Game Plan” (featuring Jon Bellion)	2015	Ojivolta	—	Writer/Producer	—	—
“80’s Films”	2016	Jon Bellion	The Human Condition	Co-writer/Co-producer	Busbee & Jon Bellion	Busbee & Jon Bellion
“Guillotine”	2016	Jon Bellion	The Human Condition	Co-writer/Co-producer	Travis Mendes & Jon Bellion	Jon Bellion
“Hand Of God - Outro”	2016	Jon Bellion	The Human Condition	Co-writer/Co-producer	Dan Heath & Jon Bellion	—
“He Is The Same”	2016	Jon Bellion	The Human Condition	Co-writer/Co-producer	Jon Bellion	Jon Bellion
“iRobot”	2016	Jon Bellion	The Human Condition	Co-writer/Co-producer	Mylon Hayde & Jon Bellion	Mylon Hayde & Jon Bellion
“Maybe IDK”	2016	Jon Bellion	The Human Condition	Co-writer/Co-producer	Fraser T. Smith, busbee & Jon Bellion	Fraser T. Smith & Jon Bellion
“New York Soul (Part II)”	2016	Jon Bellion	The Human Condition	Co-writer/Co-producer	Steven Miller, Alec Benjamin, Mylon Hayde, & Jon Bellion	Mylon Hayde & Jon Bellion
“Overwhelming”	2016	Jon Bellion	The Human Condition	Co-writer/Co-producer	Jonathan Simpson & Jon Bellion	Jon Bellion
“Satisfaction” (featuring Nylo)	2016	Ojivolta	—	Writer/Producer	—	—
“Weight Of The World”	2016	Jon Bellion	The Human Condition	Co-writer	!llmind, Chris DeStefano, & Jon Bellion	—
“Woke The Fuck Up”	2016	Jon Bellion	The Human Condition	Co-writer	Rob Knox, Mylon Hayde, & Jon Bellion	—
“Blood in the Cut – Ojivolta Remix"	2017	K.Flay & Ojivolta	—	Producer	—	—
“Game Plan – (Pink Slip Remix)”	2017	Ojivolta	—	Producer	—	—
“Adult Swim” (featuring Tuamie)	2018	Jon Bellion	Glory Sound Prep	Co-writer/Co-producer	Jon Bellion, Latrice Pace, Kaskade, Finn Bjarnson, Amy Gileadi, Jonathan Gileadi, Craig Poole, Babbie Mason, Rob Wannamaker & Tuamie	Jon Bellion & Tuamie
“Blu”	2018	Jon Bellion	Glory Sound Prep	Co-writer/Co-producer	Jon Bellion, Busbee & Scott Harris	Jon Bellion & Busbee
“Cautionary Tales”	2018	Jon Bellion	Glory Sound Prep	Co-writer/Co-producer	Homer Steinweiss, Travis Mendes & Jon Bellion	Jon Bellion
“Conversations with my Wife”	2018	Jon Bellion	Glory Sound Prep	Co-writer/Co-producer	Jon Bellion	Jon Bellion
“Couple Retreat”	2018	Jon Bellion	Glory Sound Prep	Co-writer/Co-producer	Jon Bellion	Jon Bellion
“Fall In Line” (featuring Demi Lovato)	2018	Christina Aguilera	Liberation	Co-writer	Jonathan Simpson, Audra Mae, Christina Aguilera, & Jon Bellion	—
“JT”	2018	Jon Bellion	Glory Sound Prep	Co-writer/Co-producer	Travis Mendes & Jon Bellion	Jon Bellion
“Let’s Begin” (featuring Travis Mendes, B.Keyz, RZA & Roc Marciano)	2018	Jon Bellion	Glory Sound Prep	Co-writer/Co-producer	Aaron “YS” Dales, Mylon Hayde, B.Keyz, Travis Mendes & Jon Bellion	Aaron “YS” Dales, Mylon Hayde & Jon Bellion
“Mah’s Joint” (featuring Quincy Jones)	2018	Jon Bellion	Glory Sound Prep	Co-writer/Co-producer	Jon Bellion	Jon Bellion
“Oomph”	2018	Ojivolta & Brooke Candy	—	Producer	—	—
“Stupid Deep”	2018	Jon Bellion	Glory Sound Prep	Co-writer/Co-producer	Travis Mendes, Christianne Jensen, & Jon Bellion	Jon Bellion
“The Internet”	2018	Jon Bellion	Glory Sound Prep	Co-writer/Co-producer	Jon Bellion, Travis Mendes, & Homer Steinweiss	Jon Bellion
“If I Can’t Have You”	2019	Shawn Mendes	Shawn Mendes	Co-producer	—	Teddy Geiger, Shawn Mendes, Scott Harris, & Nate Mercereau
"Freaking Me Out"	2019	Ava Max	—	Co-writer	Amanda Ava Koci, Henry Walter, Jon Bellion, Seth Reger, Jonathan Simpson	Cirkut
“Graveyard”	2019	Halsey	Maniac	Co-writer/Co-producer	Stefan Johnson, Jordan K. Johnson, Jon Bellion, Amy Allen, Louis Bell & Halsey	Jon Bellion, Louis Bell & The Monsters & Strangerz
“NATURE”	2019	Elley Duhé	ED1*	Co-writer/Co-producer	Elley Duhé & Jon Bellion	Jon Bellion
“WHAT DO U LIKE 2 - Ojivolta Remix”	2019	Jesse Saint John	—	Producer	—	—
“EXHALE” (featuring Sia)	2020	kenzie	—	Co-writer/Co-producer	MarcLo & Casey Smith	The Monsters & Strangerz
“Fun”	2020	Selena Gomez	Rare	Co-writer/Producer	Selena Gomez, Julia Michaels & Scott Harris	—
“Hey Stupid, I Love You”	2020	JP Saxe	—	Co-writer/Producer	Scott Harris, Julia Michaels & JP Saxe	—
“Invisible Chains”	2020	Lauren Jauregui	Birds of Prey	Co-writer/Co-producer	Lauren Jauregui, David Pramik, Jon Bellion, Ingrid Andress & E. Kidd Bogart	David Pramik
“Lie To Me”	2020	Meghan Trainor	Treat Myself	Producer	—	—
“Nice to Meet Ya” (featuring Nicki Minaj)	2020	Meghan Trainor	Treat Myself	Co-writer/Producer	Meghan Trainor, Scott Harris, & Nicki Minaj	—
"On That Time"		Playboi Carti	Whole Lotta Red	Co-writer/Producer	Jordan Carter & Richard Ortiz	F1lthy
"Anyone"	2021	Justin Bieber	Justice	Co-writer/Co-producer	Eskeerdo, Stefan Johnson, Watt, Jordan K. Johnson, Michael Pollack, Jon Bellion & Justin Bieber	Watt, The Monsters & Strangerz & Jon Bellion
"On the Ground"	2021	Rosé	R	Co-writer/Co-producer	Rosé, Teddy Park, Jorgen Odegard, Jon Bellion & Amy Allen	24, Jon Bellion, Teddy Park, & Jorgen Odegard
"Industry Baby (featuring Jack Harlow)"	2021	Lil Nas X	—	Co-producer	—	Kanye West, Take A Daytrip, Drew Sliger, Roy Lenzo
"24"	2021	Kanye West	Donda	Co-writer/Co-producer	Brian Miller, Cory Henry, Kanye West, Mark Mbogo, & Warryn Campbell	Kanye West, Allday, Warryn Campbell, Cory Henry
"Believe What I Say"	2021	Kanye West	Donda	Co-writer/Co-producer	Dwayne Abernathy Jr., Isaac De Boni, Jahmal Gwin, Kanye West, Mark Myrie, & Michael Mule	Kanye West, Dem Jointz, BoogzDaBeast, & FNZ
"Come to Life"	2021	Kanye West	Donda	Co-writer/Co-producer	Jeff Bhasker, Kanye West, & Warryn Campbell	Kanye West, Jeff Bhasker, Warryn Campbell, & Mike Dean
"Donda"	2021	Kanye West	Donda	Co-writer/Co-producer	Isaac De Boni, Jahmal Gwin, Kanye West, & Michael Mule	Kanye West, BoogzDaBeast, & FNZ
"God Breathed"	2021	Kanye West	Donda	Co-writer/Co-producer	Aaron Butts, Brian Miller, Evan Mast, & Kanye West	Kanye West, Arron "Arrow" Sunday, E. Vax, & Allday
"Heaven and Hell"	2021	Kanye West	Donda	Co-writer/Co-producer	Charles Njapa, Jahmal Gwin, Kanye West, Nima Jahanbin, & Paimon Jahanbin	Kanye West, 88-Keys, BoogzDaBeast, & Wallis Lane
"Hurricane"	2021	Kanye West	Donda	Co-writer/Co-producer	Abel "The Weeknd" Tesfaye, Daniel Seeff, Dominque Armani Jones, Jahmal Gwin, Josh Mease, Kanye West, Khalil Abdul-Rahman, Mark Mbogo, Mike Dean, Ronald Oneil Spence, Jr., & Sam Barsh	Kanye West, BoogzDaBeast, Mike Dean, DJ Khalil, Ronny J, & Nascent
"Jail"	2021	Kanye West	Donda	Co-writer/Co-producer	Brian Warner, Charles Njapa, Dwayne Abernathy Jr., Kanye West, Michael Dean, Sean Solymar, & Shawn Carter	Kanye West, 88-Keys, Mike Dean, Dem Jointz, & Sean Solymar
"Jail pt 2"	2021	Kanye West	Donda	Co-writer/Co-producer	Brian Warner, Charles Njapa, Dwayne Abernathy Jr., Jonathan Kirk, Kanye West, Mike Dean, & Sean Solymar	Kanye West, 88-Keys, Mike Dean, Dem Jointz, Sean Solymar
"Junya"	2021	Kanye West	Donda	Co-writer/Co-producer	Jordan Carter, Kanye West, Nasir Pemberton, & Roark Bailey	Kanye West, Digital Nas, & Roark Bailey
"Junya pt 2"	2021	Kanye West	Donda	Co-writer/Co-producer	Jordan Carter, Kanye West, Nasir Pemberton, Roark Bailey, & Tyrone Griffin Jr	Kanye West, Digital Nas, & Roark Bailey
"Keep My Spirit Alive"	2021	Kanye West	Donda	Co-writer/Co-producer	Isaac De Boni, Jahmal Gwin, Kanye West, & Michael Mule	Kanye West, BoogzDaBeast, & FNZ
"Lord I Need You"	2021	Kanye West	Donda	Co-writer/Co-producer	—	Kanye West, BoogzDaBeast, Wheezy, & FNZ
"New Again"	2021	Kanye West	Donda	Co-writer/Co-producer	Charles Njapa, Christopher Brown, Dwayne Abernathy Jr., Jahmal Gwin, Kanye West, Laraya Robinson, Nima Jahanbin, & Paimon Jahanbin	Kanye West, BoogzDaBeast, Wallis Lane, Mia Wallis, Dem Jointz, & 88-Keys
"Off The Grid"	2021	Kanye West	Donda	Co-writer/Co-producer	Asif Aswad, David Ruoff, Elias Klughammer, Eric Sloan, Jordan Carter, Kanye West, Maxie Lee Ryles III, & Samuel Gloade	Kanye West, 30 Roc, AyoAA, David & Eli, & Sloane
"Praise God"	2021	Kanye West	Donda	Co-writer/Co-producer	Aqeel Tate, Eric Sloan Jr., Hykeem Carter, Jacques Webster II, Kanye West, & Samuel Gloade	Kanye West, 30 Roc, Zen Tachi, Mike Dean, & Sloane
"Pure Souls"	2021	Kanye West	Donda	Co-writer/Co-producer	Bastian Völkel, Christoph Bauss, Jahmal Gwin, Kanye West, Mike Dean, Orlando Wilder, Rodrick Wayne Moore, Jr., Z & Tim Friedrich	Kanye West, BoogzDaBeast, Sucuki, Shuko, Bastian Völkel, & Fyaman
"Remote Control"	2021	Kanye West	Donda	Co-writer/Co-producer	Charles Njapa, Jeffery Williams, Kanye West, Kevin Gomringer, Mike Dean, Nasir Pemberton, & Tim Gomringer	Kanye West, Cubeatz, Digital Nas, 88-Keys, & Mike Dean
"Tell the Vision"	2021	Kanye West	Donda	Co-writer/Co-producer	Bashar Jackson, Isaac De Boni, Jahmal Gwin, & Michael Mule	Kanye West, BoogzDaBeast, & FNZ
"City of Gods"	2022	Fivio Foreign, Kanye West and Alicia Keys	—	Co-writer/Co-producer	Maxie Lee Ryles III, Kanye West, Allan Lopez, Andrew Taggar, Aswad Asif, Brittany Amaradio, Cristian Dejesus Tejada, Dwayne Abernathy, Jr., Hamzal Dweep Hamaal	AyoAA, Hemz, Kanye West, Lil Mav
"Let the Smokers Shine the Coupes"	2022	Pusha T	It's Almost Dry	Co-writer/Co-producer	—	Pharrell Williams
"Rock N Roll"	2022	Pusha T	It's Almost Dry	Co-writer/Co-producer	—	Pharrell Williams
"Clean"	2022	Maude Latour	—	Co-writer/Co-producer	—	—
"Daylight"	2022	Vory and Ye	Lost Souls	Producer	—	Kanye West, 88-Keys, Evan Mast
"Summerland"	2022	Half Alive	—	Producer	—	Half Alive
"Make of It"	2022	Half Alive	—	Co-writer/producer	Half Alive	—
"True Love"	2022	Kanye West	Donda 2	Co-writer/Co-producer	Kanye West, Jahseh Onfroy, John Branch, John Cunningham, Mike Dean, Peter Phillips	Kanye West, John Cunningham, Mike Dean
"Get Lost"	2022	Kanye West	Donda 2	Co-writer/Co-producer	–	–
"Flowers"	2022	Kanye West	Donda 2	Co-writer/Co-producer	–	–
"We Did It Kid"	2022	Kanye West	Donda 2	Co-writer/Co-producer	–	–
"Sci-Fi"	2022	Kanye West	Donda 2	Co-writer/Co-producer	–	–
"Selfish"	2022	Kanye West	Donda 2	Co-writer/Co-producer	–	–
"First Time In A Long Time"	2022	Kanye West	Donda 2	Co-writer/Co-producer	–	–
"Vultures"	2024	¥$	Vultures 1	Co-writer/Co-producer	Ye, Tyrone Griffin Jr., Terrance Boykin, Durk Banks, Pharras Thomas, Cydell Young, Mathias Liyew, Gustave Rudman Rambali, Marlon Barrow, Jason Harris, Paul Beauregard, Jordan Houston	Ye, Ty Dolla $ign, Prodbyjuice, Ambezza, Gustav Rudman, Marlonwiththeglasses, Wheezy, Jasper Harris, Jae Deal
"Carnival"	2024	¥$, Rich the Kid, Playboi Carti	Vultures 1	Co-writer/Co-producer	Ye, Tyrone Griffin Jr., Dimitri Roger, Jordan Carter, Samuel Lindley, Grant Dickinson	Ye, Ty Dolla $ign, The Legendary Traxster, TheLabCook
"2024"	2024	Playboi Carti	Music	Co-writer/Co-producer	—	Kanye West & Earl On The Beat
"Backr00ms"	2024	Playboi Carti	Music	Co-writer/Co-producer	Jordan Carter, Jacques Webster II, Ronald LaTour Jr.	Cardo & Duce
"All Red"	2024	Playboi Carti	—	Co-writer/Co-producer	Jordan Carter, Richard Ortiz, Ștefan Cișmigiu, Pierre Thevenot, Jarrod Morgan	F1lthy, Lucian, Lukrative, Twisco
"Timeless"	2024	The Weeknd	Hurry Up Tomorrow	Co-writer/producer	Abel Tesfaye, Jordan Carter, Pharrell Williams, Mike Dean, Tariq "BL$$D" Sharrieff, BBYKOBE, Lawson, Blessed, Jarrod "Twisco" Morgan	Pharrell Williams, Mike Dean, Twisco
"3am"	2024	ROSÉ	Rosie	Co-writer/producer	ROSÉ, Amy Allen, Jacob Weinberg	Jacob Weinberg
"Gameboy"	2024	ROSÉ	Rosie	Co-writer/producer	ROSÉ, Amy Allen, Rob Bisel, Gregory Aldae Hein	Rob Bisel
"Not the Same"	2024	ROSÉ	Rosie	Co-writer/producer	ROSÉ, Amy Allen, Rob Bisel	Rob Bisel
"Girl Feels Good"	2024	FKA Twigs	Eusexua	Co-producer	—	Aod, FKA Twigs, Felix Joseph, Koreless, Marius de Vries
"Perfect Stranger"	2024	FKA Twigs	Eusexua	Co-producer	—	Koreless, Stargate, FKA Twigs, Stuart Price
"Sticky"	2024	FKA Twigs	Eusexua	Co-producer	—	FKA Twigs, Koreless, Jonny Leslie, Felix Joseph
"Childlike Things"	2024	FKA Twigs, North West	Eusexua	Co-producer	—	Jeff Bhasker, Koreless, Xquisite Corpse
"Striptease"	2024	FKA Twigs	Eusexua	Co-producer	—	FKA Twigs, Koreless, Marius de Vries, Dylan Brady, Felix Joseph
"Wanderlust"	2024	FKA Twigs	Eusexua	Co-producer	—	FKA Twigs, Koreless, Marius de Vries, Stuart Price, Tic
"BADGRRRL"	2025	LISA	Alter Ego	Co-writer/producer	LISA, Nathan Chen, Phillip Mueller, Risvi Tareq, Mouad Oudra, Kobe Hood	Ninetyniine, Ivsir, MW, DJH
"Crush"	2025	Playboi Carti & Travis Scott	Music	Producer	—	F1LTHY & Travis Scott
"K Pop"	2025	Playboi Carti	Music	Producer	—	Cardo & Twisco
"Evil J0rdan"	2025	Playboi Carti	Music	Producer	—	Cardo & Johnny Juliano
"Rather Lie"	2025	Playboi Carti & The Weeknd	Music	Producer	—	F1LTHY, Twisco, Ramzoid, Mike Dean
"Fine Shit"	2025	Playboi Carti	Music	Producer	—	Cash Cobain & Keanu Beats
"Backd00r"	2025	Playboi Carti	Music	Producer	—	Kanye West, Twisco, Keanu Beats, Nagra, Darius Rameshni
"Munyun"	2025	Playboi Carti	Music	Producer	—	Keanu Beats, DJH, 99Hurts
"Like Weezy"	2025	Playboi Carti	Music	Producer	—	Kelvin Krash
"HBA"	2025	Playboi Carti	Music	Producer	—	Cardo & Onokey
"South Atlanta Baby"	2025	Playboi Carti	Music	Producer	—	DJH
"Safari"	2025	Jolin Tsai	Pleasure	Co-writer/producer	Jolin Tsai, GG Ramirez, James Norton	—
"Famous"	2025	Isabel LaRosa	Raven	Co-producer	—	Thomas LaRosa
"UY SCUTI"	2026	Tezzus, diamond*, & Young Thug	UY Scuti Bøyz	Co-producer	Tezzus, Diamond*, T'Corrian Walton, Misonn Scott, Jeffery Lamar Williams II	Travis London on da Track, Juko, & Dez Wright
"Baby Wassup?"	2026	Yeonjun	No Labels: Part 02	Co-writer/producer	Yeonjun, Pdogg, Beau Nox	Pdogg
"HEAVEN"	2026	JENNIE	Fallen Angel	Co-writer/producer	Jennie, Dave Hamelin, Tyler Spry, James Essein, Jelli Dorman	Dave Hamelin, Tyler Spry
"SaWaDiKa"	2026	LISA	Press Play	Co-writer/producer	LISA, Thom Bridges, Rachel West, Danny Chung	Thom Brdiges

== Awards and nominations ==
Year	Nominee(s)	Nominated work	Award	Result
2022	Ojivolta (Raul Cubina & Mark Williams)	Donda (Kanye West)	Album of the Year (64th Annual Grammy Awards)	Nominated
2022	Ojivolta (Raul Cubina & Mark Williams)	"Jail" (Kanye West)	Best Rap Song (64th Annual Grammy Awards)	Won
2022	Ojivolta	Justice (Justin Bieber)	Album of the Year (64th Annual Grammy Awards)	Nominated
