= 2024 (song) =

2023 promotional single by Playboi Carti

Promotional single by Playboi Carti

from the album Music – Sorry 4 da Wait
- Released: December 14, 2023 (YouTube); March 25, 2025 (streaming)
- Genre: Hip-hop
- Length: 3:29
- Label: AWGE; Interscope
- Songwriters: Jordan Carter; Mark Williams; Raul Cubina; Isaac Bynum; Kanye West; Yeo Choong
- Producers: Ojivolta; Earl on the Beat; Kanye West

Playboi Carti promotional singles chronology
| "Different Day" (2023) | "2024" (2023) | "HBA" (2023) |

Music video
- "2024" on YouTube

"2024" is a song by American rapper Playboi Carti. The song was originally released as a promotional single exclusively to YouTube on December 14, 2023, and was later released to streaming platforms on the digital "V2" version of his third studio album, Music. It was later added to streaming services when it was released as part of the deluxe edition of the album, Music – Sorry 4 Da Wait, which was released on March 25, 2025. The song was produced by Ojivolta, Earl on the Beat, and Kanye West, with Yeo Choong receiving writing credits on streaming for the usage of his 2013 song "Jacob's Ladder".

== Background and release ==
From December 2023 to January 2024, Carti released several snippets and videos for upcoming music to be released on his third studio album, Music. On December 14, 2023, Playboi Carti released the music video for "2024" on YouTube. He would later perform it live for the first time, alongside other previously unheard Music songs, at the Summer Smash 2024 festival in June.

West, one of the track's producers, has collaborated with Carti prior to the release of "2024", with the former appearing on the song "Go2DaMoon" from Whole Lotta Red (which he was also an executive producer of), and the latter appearing on West's 2021 album Donda with features on "Off the Grid" and "Junya".

The song was not initially included on Music, which released on March 14, 2025. Shortly after its release, he added multiple versions of the album on his website, each with additional songs included, for digital purchase. "2024" was included on the "V2" version of the bonus album. On March 25, Carti released the deluxe edition of the album, titled Music – Sorry 4 Da Wait, and included "2024" as the thirty-second song in its track listing.

== Composition ==
The song's most prominent characteristic is its vocal samples, which were chopped from Malaysian-Australian singer-songwriter Yeo Choong's song "Jacob's Ladder". The sample is overlaid on top of synthesizers and bass lines, with pronounced 808s and horns. It was Carti's first use of his "deep voice" in a solo song, a vocal style first used on his feature from Travis Scott's song "Fein" (2024). For the first half of the song, he uses a vocal inflection more akin to his "baby voice," switching to his "deep voice" for the second half.

== Music video ==
The music video for "2024" was exclusively uploaded to YouTube on December 14, 2023. It features Carti and his associates dancing in multiple locations, such as a garage and gas station parking lot, while also showing off his car collection and designer luggage. His clothing in the video has been described as "experimental high fashion" West makes a cameo in the video, donning a black, KKK-inspired hood he had previously worn at listening parties for Vultures 1, his collaborative album with singer Ty Dolla Sign. ASAP Nast also makes an appearance.

== Critical reception ==
HotNewHipHop's Zachary Horvath commented that the song showed Carti returning to his Cash Carti era sound, but with more "nocturnal" and "dreamy" soundscapes. He also praised the songs production, commenting that "Kanye West, Ojivolta, and Earl on the Beat did a great job at creating a hypnotic beat that instantly grabs your attention." Hypebeast said that the song was "just what fans have been requesting from the rockstar rapper."

In a ranking of songs released by Playboi Carti in the lead-up to Music's release in 2025, Kieran Press-Reynolds of Complex placed "2024" in first place. He lauded the "refreshing" nature of the song as a step forward from the "rage" of Whole Lotta Red and called it "maybe the prettiest beat he's used since the 'Pissy Pamper' era."

== Personnel ==
Credits and personnel adapted from Tidal.

Musicians

- Jordan Carter – vocals
- Mark Williams – production
- Raul Cubina – production
- Isaac Bynum – production
- Yeo Choong – songwriter

Technical

- Glenn Schick – mastering
- Marcus Fritz – mixing, recording

== Charts ==
Chart performance for "2024"
| Chart (2025) | Peak position |
|---|---|
| New Zealand Hot Singles (RMNZ) | 18 |
