= Backr00ms =

2024 promotional single by Playboi Carti and Travis Scott

Promotional single by Playboi Carti and Travis Scott

from the album Music – Sorry 4 da Wait
- Released: January 1, 2024 (YouTube); March 25, 2025 (streaming)
- Recorded: 2023
- Genre: Hip-hop
- Length: 2:40
- Label: AWGE; Interscope
- Songwriters: Jordan Carter; Jacques Bermon Webster II; Ronald Nathan LaTour Jr.; Pepijn Baltus; Mark Williams; Raul Cubina
- Producers: Cardo; Ojivolta; Duce

Playboi Carti promotional singles chronology
"HBA" (2023)	"Backr00ms" (2024)	"Evil J0rdan" (2024)

Music video
- "Backr00ms" on YouTube

"Backr00ms" (stylized in all caps) is a song by American rappers Playboi Carti and Travis Scott. It was initially released as a promotional track on January 1, 2024, exclusively on YouTube, and was later released on the deluxe edition of his third studio album, Music, on March 25, 2025. The song was written by Playboi Carti and Travis Scott, alongside American record producers Cardo, Ojivolta, and Duce. It marked the fourth promotional single released for Music, preceded by the song "HBA" (originally named "H00dByAir"), which was released on December 19, 2023

== Background and release ==
Playboi Carti had already released various songs on YouTube and Instagram to promote the album Music, being the singles "Different Day", "2024", and "HBA". Scott and Carti have previously collaborated multiple times, most prominently on the track "Fein", released on Scott's third studio album, Utopia (2023), as well as the songs "Love Hurts" and "Green & Purple".

On January 1, Playboi Carti's backup dancer and experimental musician, Blackhaine, announced on Carti's Instagram story that he would be releasing a song that day, stating in the video: "New music. Carti. Travis Scott. Dropping [bleep] today". A stretched out parental advisory sticker covered his face, along with the release date "Monday 9:30". Multiple rappers supported the release of the song, such as Scott himself, Kanye West, and Ice Spice. The name "Backr00ms" is a reference to the Backrooms, a fictional location that had become popular online during 2022.

== Composition ==
"Backr00ms" is a "melodic" and "haunting" song, featuring Carti and Scott rapping "nondescript" verses regarding women and money. Carti utilizes a higher pitched variant of his "deep voice", which had first been used in the songs "Fein" and "2024".

== Music video ==
The song's music video was released along with the song itself on January 1, 2024. Its visual aesthetic is largely lo-fi, featuring Carti and Scott rapping inside of a garage next to an SUV tank. A prominent location in the music video is a largely empty office space, where Carti can be seen throwing money to an exotic dancer.

== Critical reception ==
Alexander Cole of HotNewHipHop stated that like the singles before it, "Backr00ms" is a departure from the sonics explored on Carti's previous album, Whole Lotta Red (2020). He describes the delivery from both rappers as "subdued", complimenting that Scott does a good job of "staying in Carti's pocket". He concludes that the song is "a solid collaboration that helps cement the Opium founder's new sound". Billboard's staff saw "Backr00ms" as showcasing Carti's "pop sensibility", as well as containing the best verse from Scott out of all his features on Music.

In a retrospective review of the promotional singles for Music, Complex staff ranked "Backr00ms" as fifth best, calling the song "crazy effective" and containing one of Carti's better rap performances. They also praised the songs instrumental, stating that it "makes you literally feel like you’re in a backroom".

== Personnel ==
Credits and personnel adapted from Tidal.

=== Musicians ===
- Jordan Carter – vocals
- Ronald LaTour Jr. – production
- Mark Williams – production
- Raul Cubina – production
- Pepijn Baltus – production

=== Technical ===
- Glenn Schick – mastering
- Marcus Fritz – mixing, recording
- DJ Moon – recording
