= Evil J0rdan =

2024 promotional single by Playboi Carti

Promotional single by Playboi Carti

from the album Music
- Released: January 15, 2024 (Instagram); March 14, 2025 (streaming)
- Recorded: 2023
- Genre: Hip-hop
- Length: 3:03
- Label: AWGE; Interscope
- Songwriters: Jordan Carter; Mark Williams; Raul Cubina; Ronald LaTour Jr.; John Julian; Jason Pounds; Abel Tesfaye; Leland Wayne; Tom Mikailin; Sam Levinson; Michael Walker; John Flippin
- Producers: Ojivolta; Cardo; Johnny Juliano

Playboi Carti promotional singles chronology
"Backr00ms" (2024)	"Evil J0rdan" (2024)	"K Pop" (2024)

Music video
- Evil J0rdan on YouTube

"Evil J0rdan" (stylized in all caps as "EVIL J0RDAN") is a song by American rapper Playboi Carti. It was originally released as a promotional single exclusively through Instagram on January 15, 2024, before being officially released through AWGE and Interscope Records as the fourth track from Carti's third studio album, Music, on March 14, 2025. The song was written by Carti with producers Ojivolta, Cardo and Johnny Juliano; the Weeknd is given writing credits due to a sample of "Popular", his collaboration with Carti and Madonna.

== Background and promotion ==
On January 15, 2024, Carti released "Evil J0rdan", then titled "EvilJ0rdan", alongside a music video that features him wearing a durag in different formations and drinking out of a Hello Kitty mug. He later holds up a vinyl copy of The Raging Wrath of the Easter Bunny Demo (2020) by Mr. Bungle. The song arrived as part of a series of releases in anticipation of an upcoming project, preceded by "2024", "Different Day" and "Backr00ms". He previewed the song on his Instagram story on December 8, 2023.

It was eventually revealed as part of the tracklist on March 14, 2025, shortly before its release. "Evil J0rdan" turned out to be one of three songs previewed ahead of the release to be included on the album.

The extended intro including the sample from "Popular" wasn't introduced until the version in Music, and the original music video posted on Instagram simply started from the original beats.

== Composition ==
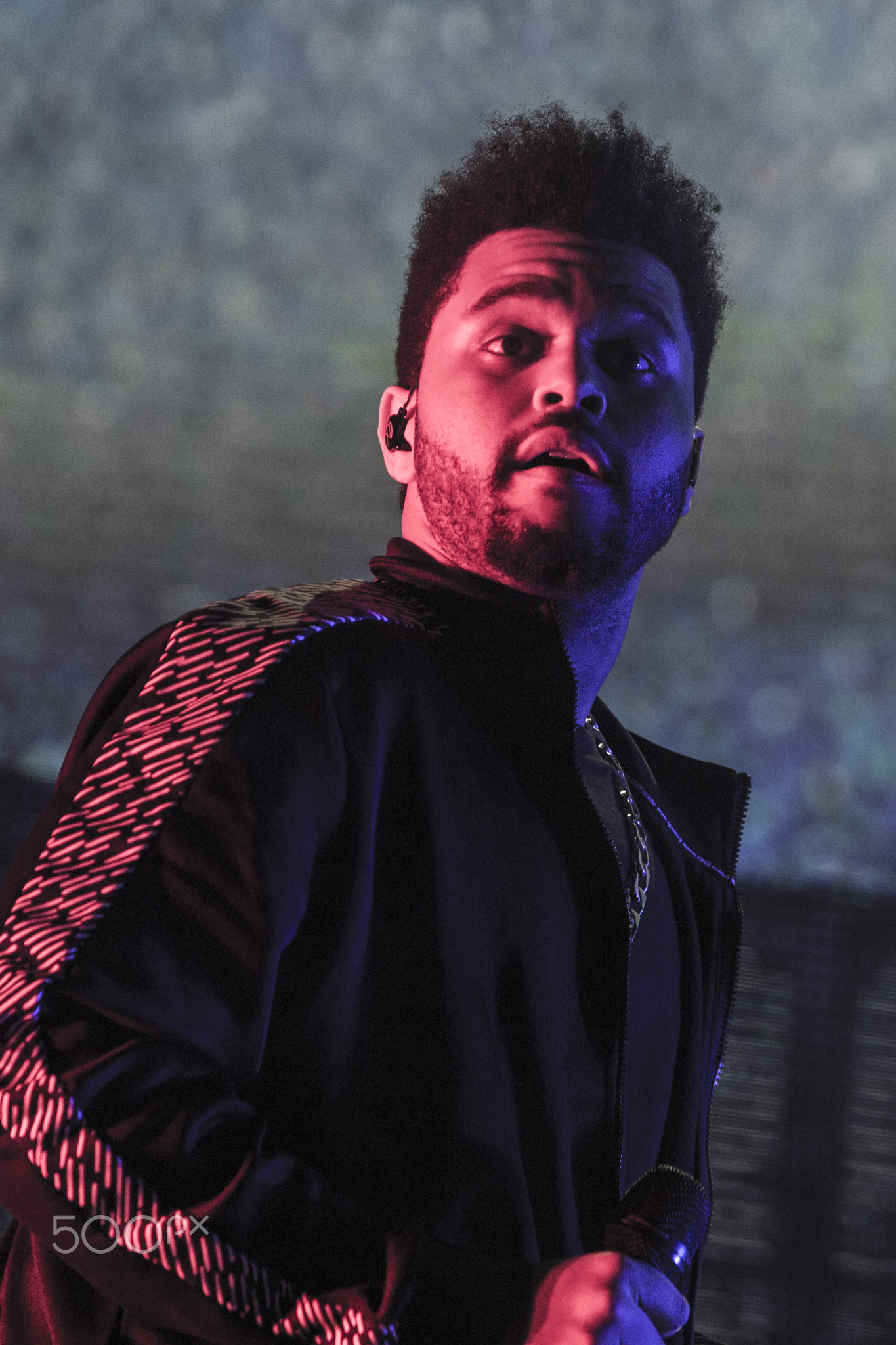
"Evil J0rdan" prominently samples the Weeknd's voice taken from his song "Popular", also featuring Carti himself, as well as Madonna.

"Evil J0rdan" was described as an "ominous hard-splat banger" with an "extended churning, dramatic intro". The intro serves as a transition between the preceding album track "K Pop" and "Evil J0rdan" connected by a sample of "Popular" (2023), as interpreted by the Weeknd, Madonna and Carti himself. The song features a "simple and direct" beat, "heavy 808s and eerie string-shrieks". Carti dives "into his lower register" over a "demonic production". It was co-produced by long-time collaborator Cardo who had already produced several of Carti's "warm-up" tracks. It also includes a sample of ".357 Magnum Pistol Shot 1: Close Perspective" (1990) by The Hollywood Edge Sound.

== Critical reception ==
In a first assessment of its parent album, C. Vernon Coleman II of XXL listed "Evil J0rdan" as one of the early standout tracks. Tom Breihan of Stereogum called the song one of his "favorites" ever since "Carti posted the lo-res video last year".

== Personnel ==
Credits and personnel adapted from Tidal.

Musicians

- Jordan Carter – vocals
- Mark Williams – production
- Raul Cubina – production
- Ronald LaTour Jr. – production
- Jason Pounds – production

Technical

- Ojivolta – mastering
- Marcus Fritz – mixing, recording

== Charts ==
=== Weekly charts ===
Weekly chart performance for "Evil J0rdan"
Chart (2025)	Peak position
Australia (ARIA)	7
Australia Hip Hop/R&B (ARIA)	1
Austria (Ö3 Austria Top 40)	6
Canada Hot 100 (Billboard)	4
Croatia (Billboard)	16
Czech Republic Singles Digital (ČNS IFPI)	2
Denmark (Tracklisten)	22
Finland (Suomen virallinen lista)	23
France (SNEP)	42
Global 200 (Billboard)	4
Greece International (IFPI)	2
Hungary (Single Top 40)	6
Iceland (Tónlistinn)	4
Ireland (IRMA)	16
Israel (Mako Hitlist)	72
Italy (FIMI)	48
Latvia Streaming (LaIPA)	1
Lithuania (AGATA)	1
Luxembourg (Billboard)	2
Netherlands (Single Top 100)	24
New Zealand (Recorded Music NZ)	5
Norway (VG-lista)	16
Poland (Polish Streaming Top 100)	1
Romania (Billboard)	5
Slovakia Singles Digital (ČNS IFPI)	1
South Africa Streaming (TOSAC)	2
Spain (PROMUSICAE)	100
Sweden (Sverigetopplistan)	32
Switzerland (Schweizer Hitparade)	3
UK Singles (Official Charts)	7
UK Hip Hop/R&B (Official Charts)	1
US Billboard Hot 100	2
US Hot R&B/Hip-Hop Songs (Billboard)	2

=== Year-end charts ===
Year-end chart performance for "Evil J0rdan"
Chart (2025)	Position
US Hot R&B/Hip-Hop Songs (Billboard)	44

== Certifications ==
Certifications for "Evil J0rdan"
Region	Certification	Certified units/sales
Brazil (Pro-Música Brasil)	Platinum	40,000^{‡}
^{‡} Sales+streaming figures based on certification alone.
