= HBA (song) =

2023 promotional single by Playboi Carti

Promotional single by Playboi Carti

from the album Music
- Released: December 20, 2023 (Instagram); March 14, 2025 (streaming)
- Recorded: 2023
- Genre: Hip-hop; trap; horrorcore
- Length: 3:32
- Label: AWGE; Interscope
- Songwriters: Jordan Carter; Ronald LaTour, Jr.; Mark Onokey
- Producers: Cardo; Onokey

Playboi Carti promotional singles chronology
| "2024" (2023) | "HBA" (2023) | "Backr00ms" (2024) |

Music video
- HBA on Instagram

"HBA" (abbreviation for H00D By Air) is a song by American rapper Playboi Carti. It was originally released as a promotional single exclusively through Instagram on December 20, 2023, before being officially released through AWGE and Interscope Records as the 28th track from Carti's third studio album, Music, on March 14, 2025. The song was written by Playboi Carti, alongside producers Cardo and Onokey. The song's title is a reference to Hood By Air, a New York City–based clothing brand.

== Background and release ==
In 2023–2024, Playboi Carti released several snippets of upcoming music to be released in his third studio album, Music. On December 19, 2023, nearly ten days after releasing "2024" on YouTube, Playboi Carti uploaded a video to his Instagram story announcing that he would drop a new song later that night. On December 20, Playboi Carti released "H00dByAir" with accompanying visuals on Instagram; the video features appearances from Opium rappers Destroy Lonely, Ken Carson, and Homixide Gang. Playboi Carti then performed "H00dByAir" live for the first time as his set-opening song, followed by other Music snippets, at the Summer Smash 2024 festival.

On March 14, 2025, Playboi Carti released his third studio album, Music, and included "H00dByAir", renamed to "HBA", as the twenty-eighth song in its track listing.

In the official version present on the album, several lines from the original track are muted, creating blank spaces where the instrumental plays on its own. In addition, DJ Swamp Izzo added a snare roll which is played several times throughout the song. This snare roll is also present on several other Music tracks.

== Production ==
In the song's outro, Playboi Carti reveals that he had a second child: a daughter named Yves.

The official version of "HBA" includes new snare rolls added to the teased "H00dByAir" snippet.

== Critical reception ==
Rolling Stone ranked the song in twentieth place in a list of the best hip-hop songs of 2024, calling it "a distillation of Carti’s grip over the culture. The track's marauding bass and menacing drums loomed large over 2024, a beacon to Carti’s loyal horde of adoring fans."

In a ranking of "loosies" released by Playboi Carti in the lead-up to Music's release in 2025, Complex placed "H00dByAir" in second place, calling it his "best pure rapping performance ... like he's in a live playground cypher, embracing Young Thug-style techniques and improvisation as he stutters, growls, and hiccups through his verses."

Billboard called "HBA" the 14th best song in Music, lauding Playboi Carti's sense of personal and career reflection but criticizing the changes to the song's drum production.

Pitchfork included "HBA" on their "The 100 Best Songs of 2024", ranking it at number 24 out of 100.

== Remixes ==
On July 1, 2025, American rapper JID released a remix to the song titled "32 (Freestyle)".

== Personnel ==
Credits and personnel adapted from Tidal.

Musicians

- Jordan Carter – vocals
- Ronald LaTour Jr. – production
- Mark Onokey – production

Technical

- Ojivolta – mastering
- Marcus Fritz – mixing, recording

== Charts ==
Chart performance for "HBA"
| Chart (2025) | Peak position |
|---|---|
| Australia (ARIA) | 82 |
| Australia Hip Hop/R&B (ARIA) | 23 |
| Canada Hot 100 (Billboard) | 52 |
| Czech Republic Singles Digital (ČNS IFPI) | 55 |
| Global 200 (Billboard) | 55 |
| Greece International (IFPI) | 30 |
| Latvia (LaIPA) | 10 |
| Lithuania (AGATA) | 23 |
| Slovakia Singles Digital (ČNS IFPI) | 30 |
| UK Audio Streaming (Official Charts) | 92 |
| US Billboard Hot 100 | 48 |
| US Hot R&B/Hip-Hop Songs (Billboard) | 23 |
