= Deaf Note =

2026 song by Ken Carson and Playboi Carti

Song by Ken Carson and Playboi Carti

from the album Xperiment
- Released: July 3, 2026
- Genre: Rage
- Length: 3:18
- Label: Opium; Interscope
- Songwriters: Kenyatta Frazier Jr.; Jordan Terrell Carter; Johnny Peng
- Producer: Skai

Music video
- "Deaf Note" on YouTube

"Deaf Note" is a song by American rappers Ken Carson and Playboi Carti, released on July 3, 2026, from his fifth studio album, Xperiment. The song was produced by Skai.

== Composition ==
"Deaf Note" is a three-minute-and-18-second song. Carson co-wrote the song with Playboi Carti, and Skai, who handled the music production for the track. On the other hand, DJ Moon, Marcus Fritz, and Glenn Schick handled the engineering, with Fritz handling the mixing and Schick handling the mastering.

Antonio Johri of Complex wrote how the track's instrumental is so guttural that it "winds up like a fucked up music box every few seconds." He also writes how the distortion and ceding all melody on the track enters territory to that of 2Slimey's music.

== Reception ==
"Deaf Note" received positive reviews from Eli Enis of Pitchfork, with Enis writing how the track showcases Carson as an "alluringly naughty hedonist dripping with personality and armed with the ability to make every line a memorable callout." A reviewer for AllMusic called the song a "powerful" and "overwhelming" track. Additionally, "Deaf Note" was featured in Rolling Stone's "Songs You Need to Know playlist". In a list done by Complex, Johri rated "Deaf Note" as the 19th best song on "Ken Carson's Top 20 Songs", writing how the Carti and Carson showcase great chemistry together and how the track lives up to its hype.

== Personnel ==
Credits and personnel adapted from Apple Music.

Musicians

- Kenyatta Frazier Jr. – vocals
- Jordan Terrell Carter - vocals
- Johnny Peng – production

Technical

- Glenn Schick – mastering
- Marcus Fritz – mixing
- Corey Moon – recording

== Charts ==
Chart performance for "Deaf Note"
| Chart (2026) | Peak position |
|---|---|
| New Zealand Hot Singles (RMNZ) | 3 |
| US Bubbling Under Hot 100 (Billboard) | 30 |
| US Hot R&B/Hip-Hop Songs (Billboard) | 18 |
