= Go2DaMoon =

2020 song by Playboi Carti featuring Kanye West

Song by Playboi Carti featuring Kanye West

from the album Whole Lotta Red
- Released: December 25, 2020
- Recorded: 2018–2020
- Length: 1:59
- Label: AWGE; Interscope
- Songwriters: Jordan Carter; Kanye West; Wesley Glass; Tobias Dekker
- Producers: Wheezy; Outtatown

Audio video
- "Go2DaMoon" on YouTube

"Go2DaMoon" is a song by American rapper Playboi Carti, featuring fellow American rapper Kanye West. It was released through AWGE and Interscope Records as the second track from Carti's second studio album, Whole Lotta Red, on December 25, 2020. The song was written by Playboi Carti and Kanye West, alongside producers Wheezy and Outtatown.

The song was one of four tracks from Whole Lotta Red to debut on both the Billboard Hot 100 and the Rolling Stone Top 100, accumulating 6.4 million streams that week.

== Background ==
The song was first teased by Carti on November 24, 2020, when he posted a video of himself dancing to the song in studio, while thanking ASAP Bari. The song lasts just under two minutes, opening with West's verse, which was considered to be reminiscent and nostalgic of his older work. It was produced by Outtatown and Wheezy, who revealed via Instagram that his producer tag was removed from the song.

== Reception ==
HipHopDX and HotNewHipHop both reported how Whole Lotta Red received a "lukewarm" reception from listeners upon its release, however, some praise was aimed at West's verse on "Go2DaMoon", considered a "redeeming quality" on the album. Attention was also geared toward West's line about Jesus, due to Whole Lotta Red being perceived to have Satanic connotations, stemming from the album's merch, which features inverted crosses, among other imagery. Uproxx's Aaron Williams found West's verse to be uninspiring, while in their album review, Pitchfork's Paul A. Thompson felt it, along with Kid Cudi and Future's appearances, "should have been left on a hard drive somewhere". NPR's Latesha Harris named it a standout track from the album.

== Commercial performance ==
The song was one of four tracks from Whole Lotta Red to debut on both the Billboard Hot 100 and the Rolling Stone Top 100, accumulating 6.3 million streams that week.

== Charts ==
Chart (2021)	Peak position
Canada Hot 100 (Billboard)	86
Global 200 (Billboard)	150
New Zealand Hot Singles (RMNZ)	4
US Billboard Hot 100	82
US Hot R&B/Hip-Hop Songs (Billboard)	30
US Rolling Stone Top 100	76
