= K Pop (Playboi Carti song) =

2024 promotional single by Playboi Carti

Promotional single by Playboi Carti

from the album Music
- Released: March 13, 2024 (Instagram); March 14, 2025 (streaming)
- Recorded: 2023–2024
- Genre: Hip-hop
- Length: 1:52
- Label: AWGE; Interscope
- Songwriters: Jordan Carter; Mark Williams; Raul Cubina; Jarrod Morgan; Ronald LaTour, Jr.
- Producers: Ojivolta; Cardo; Twisco

Playboi Carti promotional singles chronology
"Evil J0rdan" (2024)	"K Pop" (2024)

Music video
- K Pop on Instagram

"K Pop" (stylized in all caps, also known as "Ketamine") is a song by American rapper Playboi Carti. It was originally released as a promotional single exclusively through Instagram on March 13, 2024, before being officially released through AWGE and Interscope Records as the third track from Carti's third studio album, Music, on March 14, 2025. The song was written by Playboi Carti, alongside producers Ojivolta, Cardo and Jarrod "Twisco" Morgan.

== Background and release ==
In 2023–2024, Playboi Carti released several snippets of upcoming music to be released in his third studio album, Music. On March 13, 2024, Playboi Carti released "Ketamine" through social media with accompanying visuals. He then performed it live for the first time, alongside other Music snippets, at the Summer Smash 2024 festival.

On March 14, 2025, Playboi Carti released his third studio album, Music, and included "Ketamine", renamed to "K Pop", as the third song in its track listing.

== Production ==
The song, clocking in at under two minutes, lacks a hook and features Playboi Carti "doing yelpy free-association over an apocalyptically eerie beat."

== Critical reception ==
In a ranking of "loosies" released by Playboi Carti in the lead-up to Music's release in 2025, Complex placed "Ketamine" in seventh place: "The track has arguably some of the best production in the singles run. But there’s something that feels wasted here. The track is just too short, clocking in at not even two minutes, with the last 20 seconds dedicated to the beat riding out."

Hit Channel lauded the song as proof of Playboi Carti's "artistic rebellion" and lauded its "haunting beat and frenetic delivery," ultimately calling him "a testament to the transformative power of chaos. With each release, he defies expectations, carving out a space uniquely his own in the ever-evolving tapestry of music."

Billboard called "K Pop" the seventh best song in Music, calling its production "cinematic, dramatic and fantastic."

== Personnel ==
Credits and personnel adapted from Tidal.

Musicians

- Jordan Carter – vocals
- Mark Williams – production
- Raul Cubina – production
- Ronald LaTour, Jr. – production
- Jarrod Morgan – production

Technical

- Ojivolta – mastering
- Marcus Fritz – mixing, recording

== Charts ==
Chart performance for "K Pop"
Chart (2025)	Peak position
Australia (ARIA)	73
Australia Hip Hop/R&B (ARIA)	20
Canada (Canadian Hot 100)	50
Czech Republic (Singles Digitál Top 100)	35
France (SNEP)	195
Global 200 (Billboard)	35
Greece International (IFPI)	28
Latvia (LaIPA)	11
Lithuania (AGATA)	26
Slovakia (Singles Digitál Top 100)	25
UK Streaming (OCC)	77
US Billboard Hot 100	38
US Hot R&B/Hip-Hop Songs (Billboard)	18
