= Fatt Smaxk =

American rapper

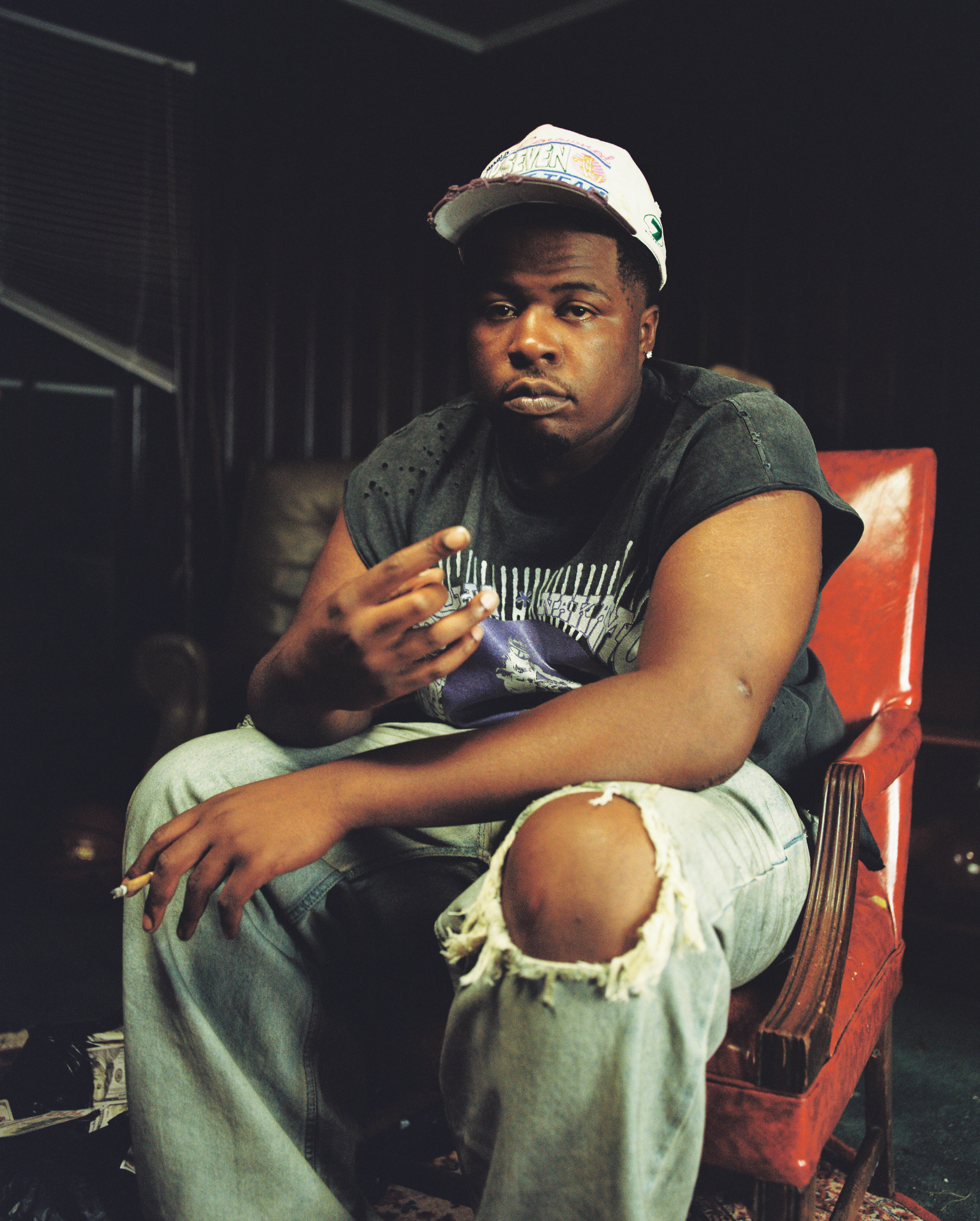

Background information
- Also known as: HardNard
- Born: Bernard Banks; Atlanta, Georgia, U.S.
- Genre: Trap
- Occupations: Rapper; Songwriter
- Years active: 2021–present
- Label: Independent

Bernard Banks, known professionally as Fatt Smaxk is an American rapper from Atlanta, Georgia. He is known for the singles "Butta B" and "Smaxk or Die", both of which appeared on Billboard's Atlanta Strip Club Chart.

== Career ==
Fatt Smaxk, previously known as HardNard, began recording music in Atlanta in the early 2020s. In 2025, he released the mixtape Smaxk Season 2. The mixtape was discussed by Black America Web, which noted its themes of loss and loyalty.

Smaxk or Die appeared on Billboard's Atlanta Strip Club Chart and was later included in editorial selections by Complex.

In 2026, Butta B was reported by Hits Daily Double as receiving 41 rhythmic radio add commitments during its first week of promotion.

In May 2026, a remix of Smaxk or Die featuring Playboi Carti was released and accompanied by a music video filmed in Atlanta.

In June 2026, The Fader included "Smaxk or Die" in its "Song of the Summer 2026" feature.

== Discography ==
=== Mixtapes ===
- No Caller ID (2024)
- Since a Youngin (2024)
- Smaxk Season (2025)
- Smaxk Season 2 (2025)
- Smaxk Season 3 (2026)

=== Selected singles ===
- "Butta B"
- "Smaxk or Die"
- "Smaxk or Die" (Remix) (featuring Playboi Carti)
- "Up the Score"
