= Playboi Carti =

American rapper (born 1990s)

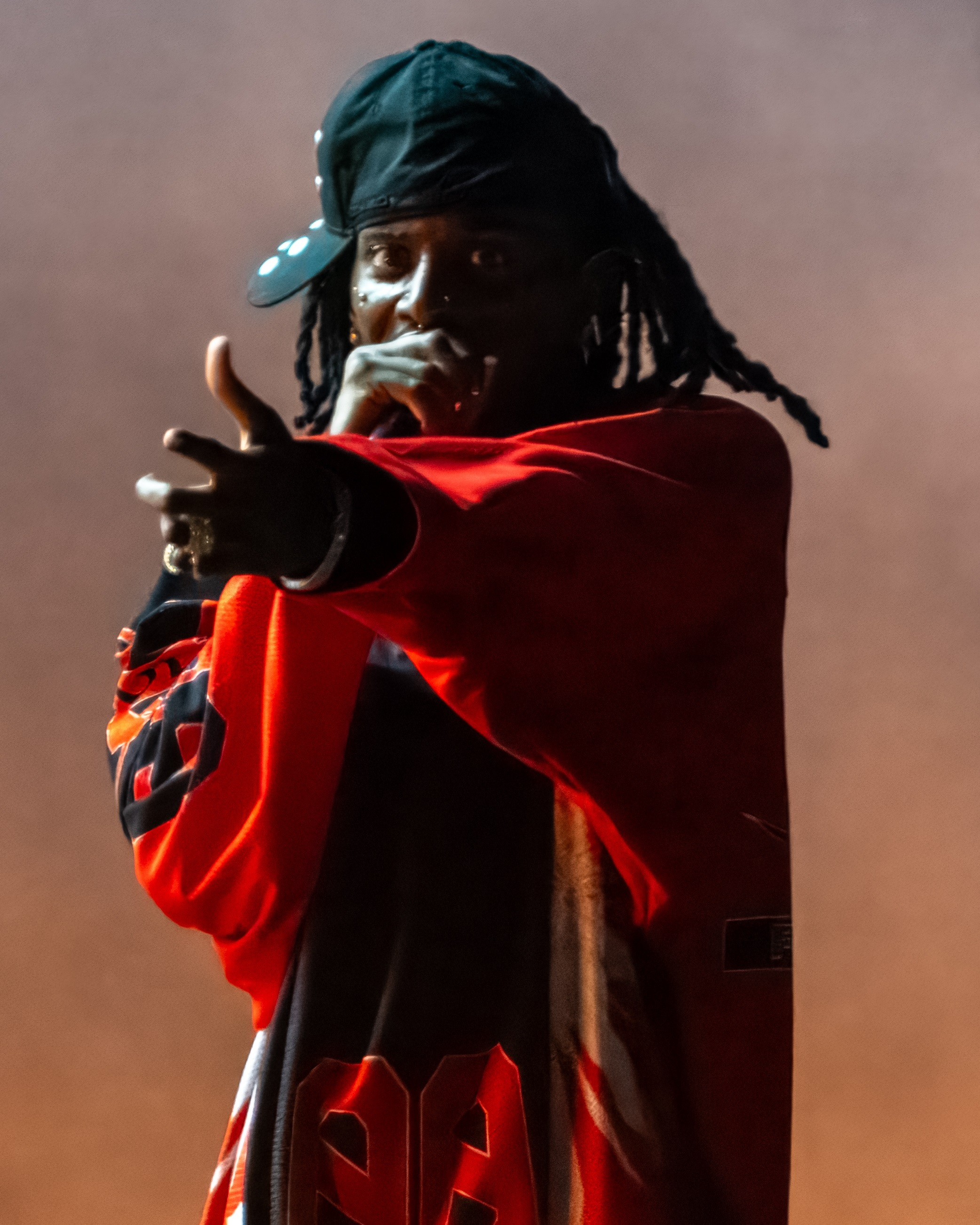
- Playboi Carti in 2024
- Born: Jordan Terrell Carter; September 13, 1995 or 1996 (age 30 or 31); Atlanta, Georgia, US
- Other names: Sir Cartier; Cash Carti; Carti
- Occupations: Rapper; singer; songwriter
- Years active: 2011–present
- Works: Discography
- Children: 2
- Awards: Full list
- Musical career
- Genres: Southern hip-hop; trap; SoundCloud rap; cloud rap; rage; punk rap
- Labels: Awful; AWGE; Interscope; Opium
- Member of: ASAP Mob
- Website: playboicarti.com

Jordan Terrell Carter (born September 13, 1995 or 1996), (Note: Sources report 1995 or 1996 as the birth year.) known professionally as Playboi Carti, is an American rapper. Known for his eccentric vocal style, beat selection, and fashion, he is often regarded as one of the most influential figures in modern hip-hop and is credited as a pioneer of the rage microgenre.

Born and raised in Atlanta, Georgia, Carter began his musical career under the stage name Sir Cartier in 2011, self-releasing early tracks on SoundCloud. He signed with Awful Records in 2014 and with ASAP Rocky's AWGE imprint in 2016, a joint venture with Interscope Records. Carter gained mainstream attention in 2017 with his self-titled debut mixtape, which peaked at number 12 on the US Billboard 200 and produced the singles "Magnolia" and "Wokeuplikethis" (featuring Lil Uzi Vert). His debut studio album, Die Lit (2018), was met with commercial success, debuting at number three on the Billboard 200.

Carter's second studio album, Whole Lotta Red (2020), was his first number-one album on the Billboard 200, and was later listed among the greatest hip-hop albums by Rolling Stone. After a series of high-profile collaborations, including Travis Scott's "Fein", the Weeknd's "Timeless", and Kanye West and Ty Dolla Sign's "Carnival" (2024)—the latter becoming his first number-one single on the US Billboard Hot 100–Carter released his third studio album, Music (2025). The album received generally positive reviews and became his second consecutive number-one on the Billboard 200. It yielded the promotional single "Evil J0rdan", which debuted at number two on the Billboard Hot 100. Outside of music, Carter founded the record label and rap collective Opium in 2019, which has signed artists including Ken Carson, Destroy Lonely, Homixide Gang, and fellow ASAP Mob member ASAP Nast.

== Early life ==
Jordan Terrell Carter was born in Atlanta, Georgia, on September 13, 1995, or 1996. He grew up in the nearby suburb of Riverdale with one older brother, and attended North Springs Charter High School in Sandy Springs. In a 2016 interview with Complex, he stated that he had little interest in pursuing higher education or military service, and instead sought after ways to make money. Before beginning his rap career, Carter aspired to play professional basketball. He later recalled focusing on basketball during his youth but eventually quit the sport following a disagreement with his coach. He then began dedicating more time to music, sometimes skipping class to record songs or work at an H&M.

Carter developed an interest in music at a young age, first participating in choir, which he said he initially joined to meet girls but later found creatively inspiring. During his teenage years, Carter began rapping under the name Sir Cartier, releasing projects and music videos that circulated in Atlanta. His earliest videos featured him performing in South Atlanta strip malls and parking lots with friends. Carter has credited his older brother with introducing him to Gucci Mane and other Atlanta rappers who influenced his early style.

Alongside music, Carter developed a strong interest in fashion. He recalled being among the first in his neighborhood to wear skinny jeans and ride a skateboard, drawing inspiration from punk aesthetics he observed at Atlanta's Historic Fourth Ward Skatepark. He often shopped at thrift stores, experimenting with clothing that set him apart from peers, sometimes attracting ridicule for his unconventional style. He rarely attended high school in later years, focusing instead on recording and attempting to secure a record deal. At the age of 18, Carter moved to New York City to further pursue a music career.

== Career ==
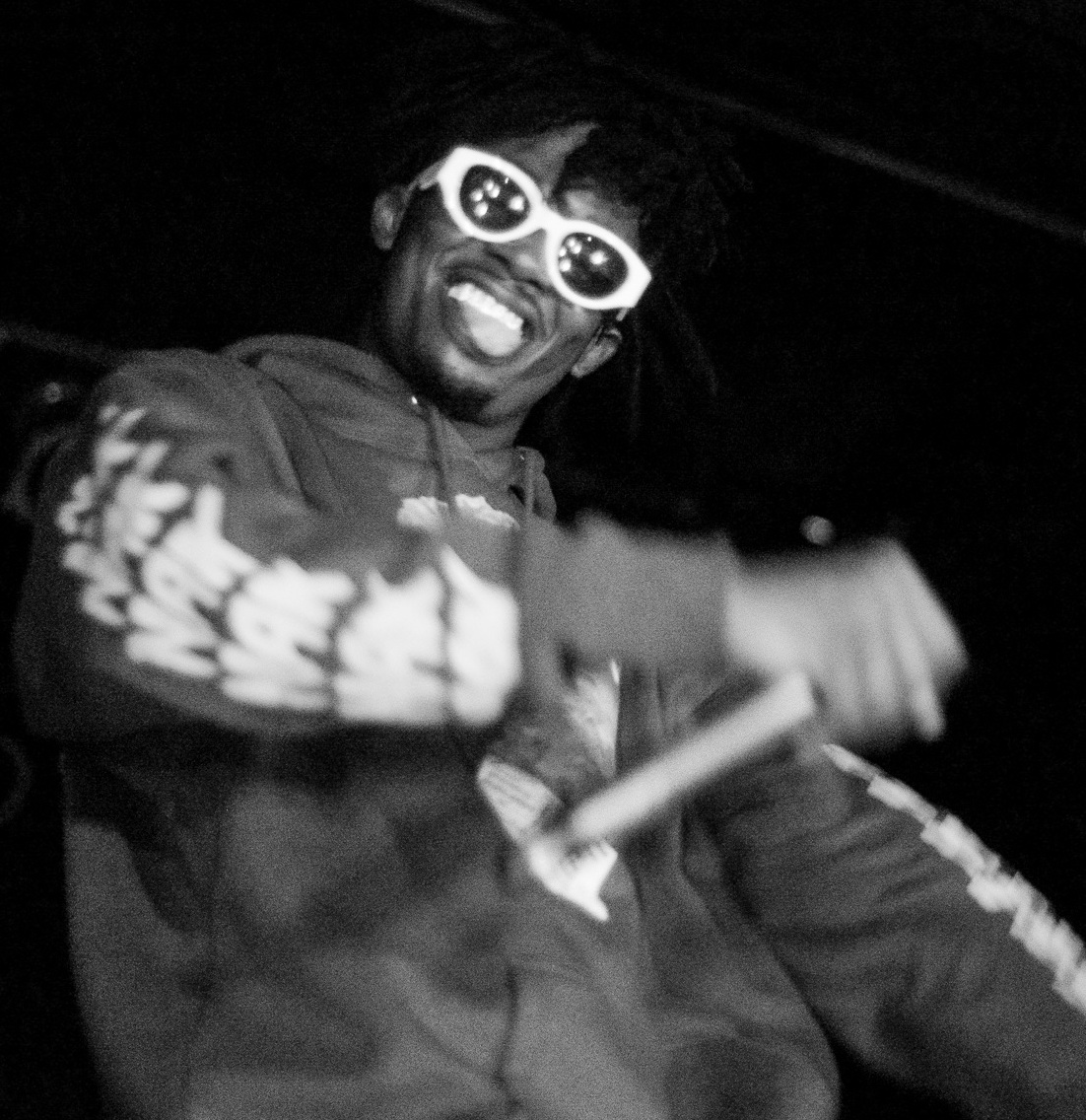
Carter performing in November 2016

=== 2011–2016: Career beginnings ===
Carter began his musical career under the moniker Sir Cartier in 2011, initially uploading his early tracks on SoundCloud. By 2013, he rebranded himself as Playboi Carti and expanded his reach by sharing his music on platforms like Newgrounds. In 2014, after meeting fellow Atlanta native, Ethereal, a producer and member of the underground collective Awful Records, Carter soon joined the Awful roster. Carter credits Ethereal with helping him discover and develop his distinctive sound. As Carter committed to pursuing music full-time, he made the significant decision to relocate to New York City, where he temporarily stayed with a drug dealer he knew. During this time, he frequently encountered members of the influential ASAP Mob, eventually meeting ASAP Bari, who introduced him to ASAP Rocky. This connection was instrumental in Carter's career, leading him to accompany Rocky on a trip to Texas, marking the beginning of his rise in the music industry.

In 2015, Carter began attracting widespread attention with the release of his singles "Broke Boi" and "Fetti", featuring Dash and Maxo Kream. These tracks, shared on SoundCloud, quickly gained traction within the underground scene. Concurrently, Carter was actively collaborating with artists in Atlanta's burgeoning underground rap scene, including UnoTheActivist, Thouxanbanfauni, Yung Bans, Lil Yachty, as well as producers MexikoDro and Icytwat. In 2016, he officially signed to ASAP Rocky's AWGE imprint, a joint venture with Interscope Records. Later that year, he'd support ASAP Ferg on the Turnt & Burnt Tour and to co-headline the Left Right Tour alongside Lil Uzi Vert. Carter was featured on two tracks from ASAP Mob's debut studio album, Cozy Tapes Vol. 1: Friends, released on October 31. He contributed to "Telephone Calls" alongside ASAP Rocky, Tyler, the Creator, and Yung Gleesh, and appeared on "London Town" with ASAP Rocky and ASAP Ant.

=== 2017–2020: Self-titled mixtape, Die Lit, and Whole Lotta Red ===
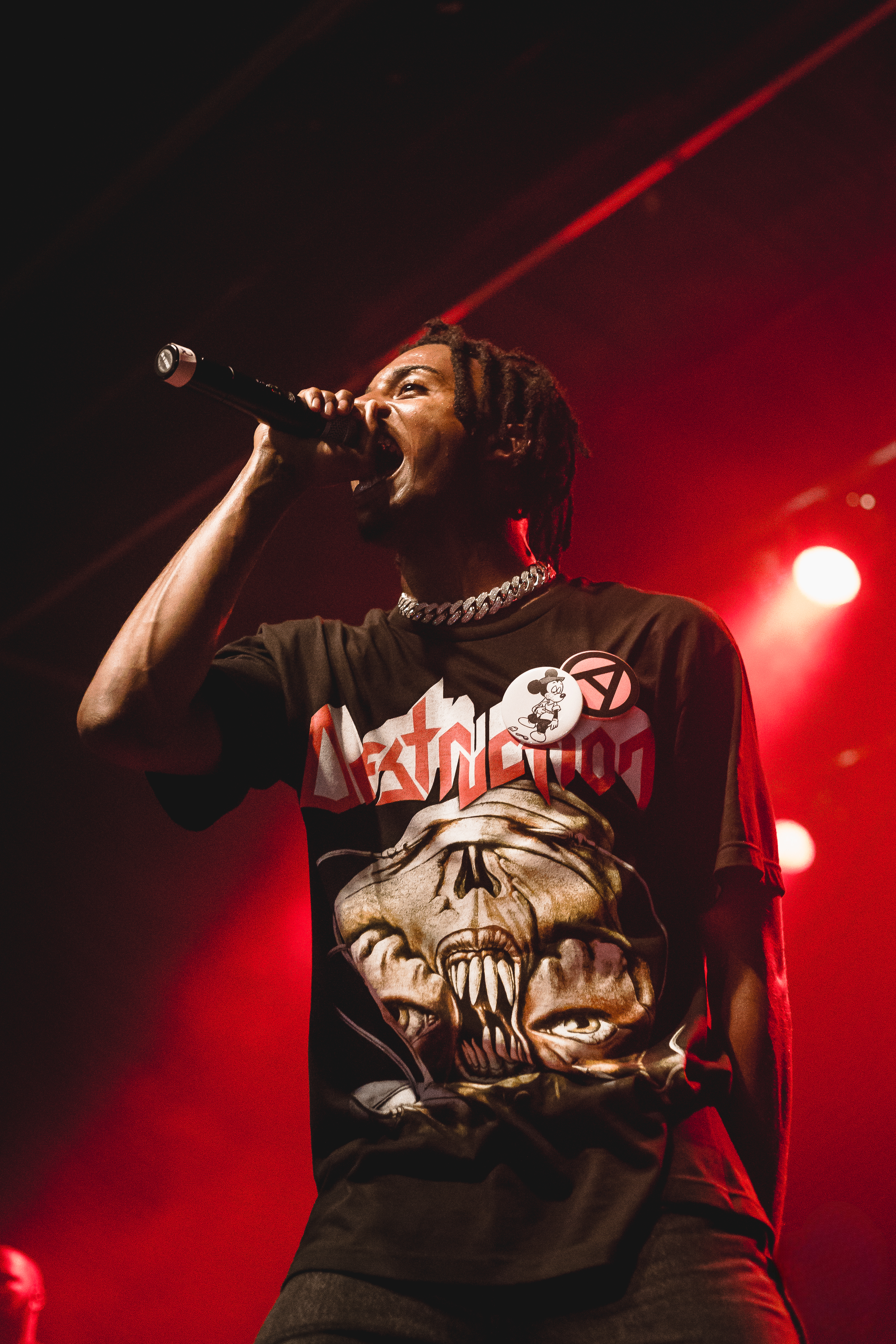
Carter performing in August 2017

In April 2017, Carter released his self-titled debut mixtape, which garnered significant attention from major music publications such as XXL, Pitchfork, Spin, HotNewHipHop, and PopMatters. The mixtape debuted at number 12 on the Billboard 200 and produced two successful singles: "Magnolia", which peaked at number 29 on the Billboard Hot 100, and "Wokeuplikethis" featuring Lil Uzi Vert, which reached number 76. To promote the mixtape, Carter embarked on a tour alongside Gucci Mane and Dreezy, as well as embarking on his own tour later that year. In June, Carter was featured on the cover of XXL, as part of its annual "Top 10 Freshman List", along with fellow up-and-coming rappers such as XXXTentacion, A Boogie wit da Hoodie, Ugly God, and PnB Rock. During this period, Carter was featured on ASAP Mob's single "Raf", from their album Cozy Tapes Vol. 2: Too Cozy and on Lana Del Rey's single "Summer Bummer" from her album Lust for Life. In September, Carter teased a collaboration mixtape with Lil Uzi Vert titled 16*29. In October, a joint tour with Lil Uzi Vert called the 16*29 Tour was announced, further promoting the possibility of a collaboration project. The tour was cancelled shortly thereafter due to Lil Uzi Vert claiming they needed to "focus". Later in the year, Carter began working on his debut studio album, Die Lit, alongside producer Pi'erre Bourne.

In May 2018, Carter released his debut studio album, Die Lit. Marketed with no radio play or much press coverage, it was a commercial success and was positively reviewed by several publications. To support the album, Carti embarked on the Die Lit Tour during the summer of 2018, performing across various cities in North America. Later that year, in August, Carter announced his second studio album, Whole Lotta Red, which would be released two years later. During the next two years, numerous tracks, including "Pissy Pamper" were leaked online, amassing tens of millions of streams unofficially. Carter did not release any new original music during this period, though he was featured on several songs, including "Baguettes in the Face" with Nav and A Boogie wit da Hoodie from Mustard's album Perfect Ten, "Almeda" by Solange, from her album When I Get Home, and "Earfquake" by Tyler, the Creator, from his album Igor, as well as opening up for ASAP Rocky's Injured Generation Tour and Wiz Khalifa's Decent Exposure Summer Tour. In the same year, Carter launched his own imprint, under the name of Opium.

In April 2020, Carter broke his musical silence by releasing the single "@ Meh", which peaked at number 35 on the Billboard Hot 100. The following month, Carter appeared on Drake's mixtape Dark Lane Demo Tapes, on the song "Pain 1993", which debuted at number 7 on the Billboard Hot 100, marking Carter's first entry into the chart's top ten. In November, Carter announced that Whole Lotta Red was complete and had been submitted to his label. The following month, Carter was featured on Lil Yachty's deluxe album Lil Boat 3.5 on the track "Flex Up", alongside Future. In December, Carter released his second studio album, Whole Lotta Red, on Christmas Day, after announcing its release date four days earlier. The album debuted at number one on the Billboard 200, becoming Carter's first chart-topping album on the chart. Rolling Stone deemed it "one of the most forward-thinking rap records since Yeezus", and later crowned it the best rap album of 2021. In 2022, the magazine also included it in "The 200 Greatest Hip-Hop Albums of All Time". To support the album, Carter embarked on the King Vamp Tour, originally titled the Narcissist Tour, for fall 2021.

=== 2021–2025: Music ===
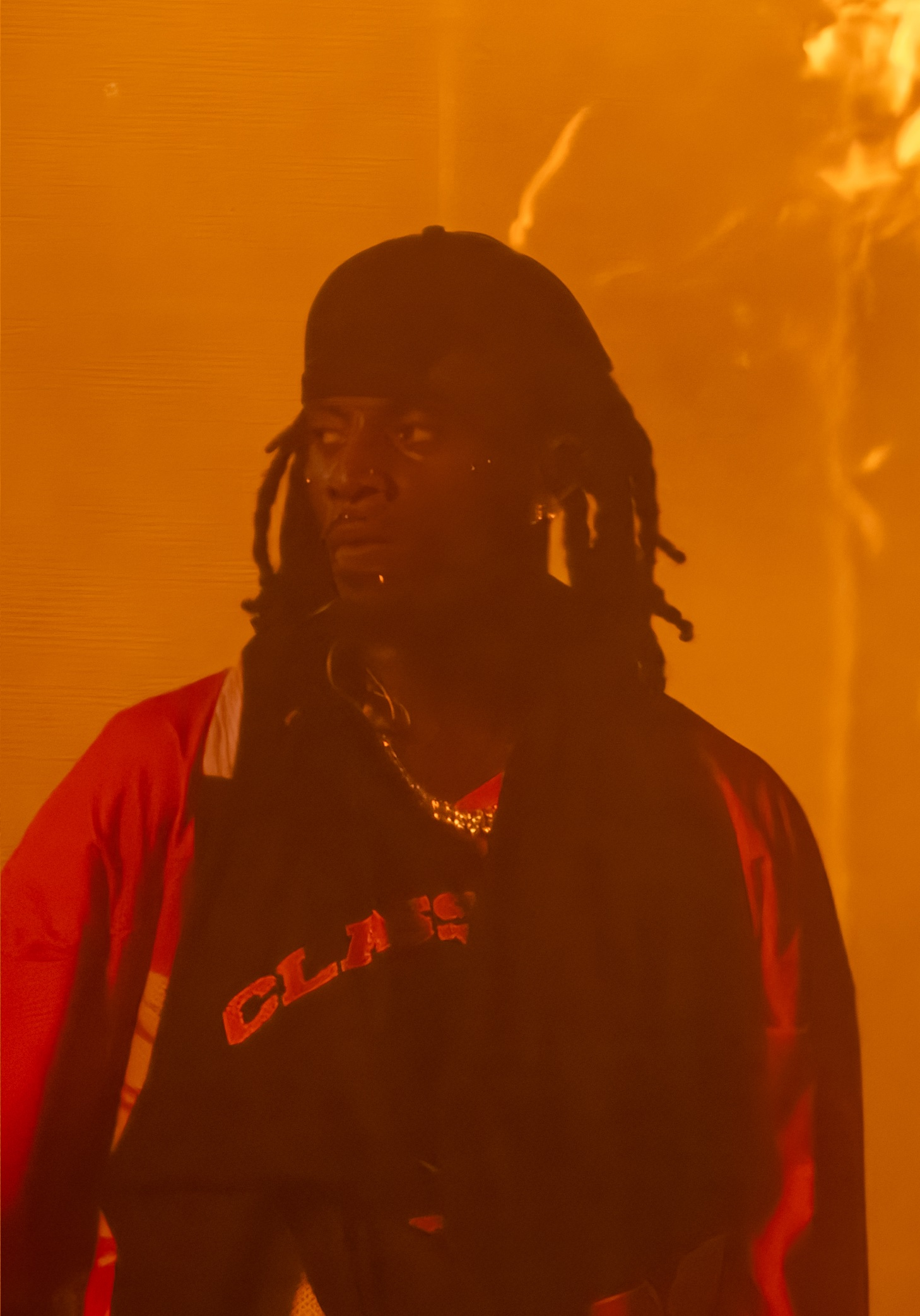
Carter performing in July 2024

On March 10, 2021, just three months after Whole Lotta Red was released, Carter hinted at a new album on Instagram. By August 2021, he had revealed the album's title, Narcissist, and set a release date for September 13, although the date ultimately passed without the album's release. In June 2021, Carter was featured on Pi'erre Bourne's "Switching Lanes", from his album The Life of Pi'erre 5, and Lil 1 Dte's "Homixide", from his eponymous album. In August of the same year, he appeared on ABRA's song "Unlock It" and contributed to several tracks on Kanye West's album Donda, including "Off the Grid", "Junya" and "Junya Pt 2". In July 2022, Carter served as an executive producer for his signee, Ken Carson's album X. In March 2023, Carter performed an unreleased track at Rolling Loud California. In June 2023, Carter collaborated with the Weeknd and Madonna on the song "Popular", which was originally released as the lead single for the cancelled soundtrack album, The Idol, Vol. 1. In July 2023, Carter performed "Pop Out", which later appeared on Music, at Wireless Festival. Later that month, Carter appeared on Travis Scott's album Utopia, on the track "Fein".

On December 8, 2023, Carter released the track "Different Day" through the Opium Instagram account, accompanied by a full-length music video. In the following weeks, Carter released a series of promotional singles ahead of his third studio album, Music: "2024" on December 14, "HBA" on December 19, "Backr00ms" featuring Travis Scott on January 1, 2024, and "Evil J0rdan" on January 15. In February 2024, Carter made a guest appearance during Travis Scott's performance at the 66th Annual Grammy Awards. Later that month, he was featured on Kanye West's and Ty Dolla Sign's album Vultures 1 on the tracks "Carnival" and "Fuk Sumn", with "Carnival" becoming his first chart-topping single. In March 2024, Carter released the sixth promotional single for Music, "K Pop", through the Opium Instagram account. The same month, he was featured on Metro Boomin's and Future's song "Type Shit", from their album We Don't Trust You, as well as featuring on Camila Cabello's single "I Luv It", from her album C,XOXO. In August 2024, Carter was featured on Kanye West's and Ty Dolla Sign's Vultures 2, on the track "Field Trip". In September 2024, Carter released the single "All Red", marking his first solo streaming release since 2020's "@ Meh". Later that month, Carter collaborated with the Weeknd on the song "Timeless", as the lead single for Weeknd's album Hurry Up Tomorrow.

On December 15, 2024, Carter performed at Rolling Loud in Miami; he had announced weeks prior that he intended to play Music during his one hour and fifteen minute set, ultimately, he played five new songs. In March 2025, Carter released his third studio album, Music, after following teasers by Spotify. It became his second consecutive number-one record on the Billboard 200, with 290,000 album-equivalent units sold in its first week. Later that month, Carter released the album's deluxe edition, titled Music - Sorry 4 Da Wait, alongside a music video for "FOMDJ", as well as featuring on Nav's album OMW2 Rexdale, on the song "Unlimited". In April 2025, Carter featured on Ken Carson's album More Chaos, on the song "Off the Meter", alongside Destroy Lonely. After the release of Music, Carter embarked as a supporting act for the Weeknd's 2025 North America After Hours til Dawn Tour leg, alongside Mike Dean. In August 2025, Carter announced the Antagonist Tour, with support from Opium signees Ken Carson, Destroy Lonely, the duo HXG, and affiliate ApolloRed1, lasting from October 3 to December 1. The tour was originally planned to begin in July 2023 but was postponed and cancelled. Following this cancellation, Carti joined the Weeknd as an opening act on the 2025 North American leg of the After Hours til Dawn Tour. Later that year, the Antagonist Tour was relaunched. The rescheduled tour was announced as a 28-date North American arena run, beginning on October 3, 2025, in Salt Lake City and concluding on December 1, 2025, in Atlanta, with returning acts Ken Carson, Destroy Lonely, and Homixide Gang, as well as Apollo Red, serving as the supporting acts. On September 8, 2025, three additional dates were added in Texas. During the tour, specifically at the Los Angeles concert in the Crypto.com Arena, Carti brought out Kendrick Lamar to perform their track "Good Credit", additionally, he brought out ASAP Rocky and Fakemink. In November 2025, he was featured on the track "Let's Do It" alongside Lil Baby and Skooly.

=== 2026: Collaborations ===
On May 22, 2026, Carti featured on the remix of Fatt Smaxk's "Smaxk or Die". On July 3, Carti made two guest appearances on Ken Carson's Xperiment, namely on the tracks "Deaf Note" and "WeDidIt". On July 25, 2026, Carti was featured on the track "Been On" by L5. On November 20, 2026, Carter appeared on the soundtrack album Grand Theft Auto VI: The Album with the song "Ahh Yea", for the video game of the same name.

== Fashion and modeling career ==
Carter's fashion style is one of the main features of his public image. He has called himself a "thrift store kid" and often prefers vintage garments. GQ has defined Carter as the "leader of a youth style", and said that he represents a stylistic midpoint between the "fashion gloss of ASAP Mob, the punk-rock attitude of Lil Uzi Vert, and the playful camp of Lil Yachty."

Carter's favorite designer label is Balmain and his favorite designer is Raf Simons, whom he met at a 2017 fashion show in New York City. Carter is featured on the song "Raf" by ASAP Mob, which was dedicated to Raf Simons. The music video for the song included Carter, ASAP Rocky, and Quavo wearing rare Raf Simons-designed clothing. In 2017, Carter told Vogue that he considers Kanye West and ASAP Rocky his fashion inspirations.

Carter has modeled numerous times, including Louis Vuitton at Paris Fashion Week, Kanye West's Yeezy Season 5, VFiles, and Drake's OVO Lookbook alongside Ian Connor and John Ross.

== Artistry ==
=== Influences and musical style ===
Carter is known for his eccentric vocal style and fashion, and has been described as an influential figure in modern hip-hop and a pioneer of the rage microgenre. Carter has cited influences from a variety of artists, including ASAP Rocky, Kanye West, Jay-Z, MF Doom, Slayer, Michael Jackson, the Sex Pistols, and Kiss. Carter's earliest songs were influenced by Wiz Khalifa, Currensy, and Odd Future. He embodies a "rock star" persona and is known for his playful, hard-hitting, and melodic style. Almost all of Carter's raps are freestyled, which was directly inspired by Lil Wayne. Carter's approach to music emphasizes atmosphere over traditional lyricism, with critics noting that his rapping is often "spare and repetitive", focusing more on flow and catchy phrases. Briana Younger at Pitchfork said that "Carti's music is less about lyricism and more about atmosphere", going on to say that "whatever Carti lacks in substance he makes up in sheer audacity."

Carter's music primarily falls under the "mumble rap" genre, characterized by a focus on catchy hooks and infectious beats. His early work showcased a carefree and youthful vibe, often steering clear of serious themes. However, as his artistry evolved, he began to incorporate more experimental sounds, particularly in his later projects. Songs like "Earfquake" and "Pissy Pamper" reflect his exploration of various vocal techniques, including his distinct "baby voice", which features high pitches and frantic cadences. This vocal style contributes to the playful yet edgy atmosphere of his music. In 2020, Carter released Whole Lotta Red, which further showcased his experimentation with sound, featuring inspirations of punk and metal into his hip-hop roots. This album marked a significant shift in his artistic direction, allowing him to delve into more intense themes while maintaining his signature melodic style.

=== Voice ===
"Pissy Pamper"
Sample of Carter's verse on "Pissy Pamper" where he uses his "baby voice" technique.

Carter is recognized for his unique vocal delivery, often described as a "baby voice" technique that captures attention with its high-pitched, unclear pronunciations. He has used this technique on popular songs such as "Almeda" with Solange, "Earfquake" with Tyler, the Creator, and "Pissy Pamper" with Young Nudy and Pi'erre Bourne. After the release of Whole Lotta Red, he has also experimented with various metal-inspired vocalizations, such as his coarse "deep voice" first being displayed on the song "Mr Miyagi" with Kanye West and Future, later being displayed on other songs like Travis Scott's "Fein", the collaborative single "Type Shit" with Future, Metro Boomin, and Scott, and Camila Cabello's "I Luv It", and later appearing on Carter's third album, Music. The New York Times described that Carter's style seems to emphasize performance and persona over conventional rapping skills, allowing him to create a captivating experience for listeners. His aesthetic choices often incorporate Satanic imagery and vampire influences.

== Personal life ==
Early in his career, Carter was romantically involved with Rubi Rose, a model and rapper who rose to fame after appearing in the music video for "Bad and Boujee" by Migos. He allegedly fired a gun in the air after Rose hid his phones from him before he was due to board a flight. Carter argues his intention was not to shoot Rose. They broke up after Carter allegedly cheated on her. In 2017, he briefly dated American model Blac Chyna. In 2017, he was arrested for domestic battery for an altercation with a girlfriend, though charges may not have been filed.

Later in 2018, Carter began dating Australian rapper Iggy Azalea, whom he met while he was overseas on tour. In December 2018, they moved in together in the Buckhead neighborhood of Atlanta. They split in December 2019. In 2020, Azalea gave birth to Carter's first child, a son, Onyx. In December that year, Azalea accused him of missing their son's birth and cheating on her. As of 2020, Carter has not signed their son's birth certificate. In 2025, Azalea alleged Carti has no relationship with their son.

In February 2023, Carter was arrested for choking his pregnant girlfriend after a fight over paternity testing, according to police. In December 2023, Carter revealed that he has a second child, a daughter, Yves.

As of June 2019, Carter is living and working in and around the Atlanta area after relocating from Los Angeles. Carter has asthma.

== Legal issues ==
Carter has been involved in multiple legal issues. In 2017, Carter was arrested for domestic battery after an altercation with his girlfriend, though charges may not have been filed. In January 2019, Carter was convicted and fined £800 for assaulting his tour bus driver at an incident that took place in February 2018 in Gretna, Scotland. In April 2020, Carter was arrested on gun and drug-related charges in Clayton County, Georgia. After Carter was stopped by police for having an expired tag on his Lamborghini, authorities found 12 bags of marijuana, three guns, Xanax, codeine and oxycodone. Following an altercation between Carter and the police, he and another man named Jaylon Tucker, were arrested and taken to Clayton County jail. Carter was later charged for expired tags, possession of marijuana and improperly passing an emergency vehicle. The following morning Carter was released on bond.

Mug shot of Carter, December 2022

On September 21, 2022, Carter was arrested for reckless driving for driving 133 miles per hour in a 55 miles per hour zone, with footage of the incident being released on January 9, 2024. It was also reported by TMZ on February 14, 2023 that Carter had been arrested on December 29 with a felony assault charge after allegedly choking his girlfriend, who was 14 weeks pregnant. Carter was released on bond a day after his arrest. On July 15, 2025, Carter was denied entry to Canada, forcing the cancellation of scheduled opening acts for the Weeknd on July 15, 16 and 19. The shows were otherwise scheduled to continue. On October 2, 2025, Carter was again charged with assault after allegedly punching his limousine driver, Carl Reynolds, in the face while on tour in Utah. Police footage of Carter's arrest was released by the digital media Cufboys via YouTube on July 30, 2026.

== Other ventures ==
=== Opium ===
Opium is an American record label and rap collective founded in 2019 by Carter. The label, which is based in Atlanta, Georgia, currently holds five acts: Carter himself, rappers Ken Carson, Destroy Lonely, and ASAP Nast, and rap duo HXG, all of whom are natives to the city (besides ASAP Nast). The label is also affiliated with a variety of producers, including KP Beatz, Lil 88, and F1lthy, who all worked extensively on Carter's second album, Whole Lotta Red. Opium artists usually feature a dark rap sound and aesthetic that is built upon the Atlanta rage rap scene and is influenced by the 70s and 80s punk rock era. The niche style of its artists strays away from mainstream trap rappers and has garnered its own cultlike fanbase.

=== Thomas Ashbourne ===
In June 2022, Carter became a founding partner of the ready-to-drink cocktail company Thomas Ashbourne. As part of the launch, he introduced a signature vodka-based cocktail called the Hardscatto, alongside founding partners Sarah Jessica Parker, Ashley Benson, Rosario Dawson, Vanessa Hudgens, and John Cena.

=== YVL ===
In 2025, Carter launched the fashion brand YVL (short for Young Vamp Life), a name he had previously popularized through his music, merchandise, and personal branding. The brand debuted with a line of fitted caps bearing the "YVL" logo in multiple colorways. Later that year, YVL collaborated with Mitchell & Ness and the NBA on a collection of retro basketball jerseys representing seven NBA franchises, with the designs incorporating YVL branding.

=== Fortnite collaboration ===
On November 24, 2025, popular battle royale game, Fortnite announced that they would be hosting an in-game collaboration with Carter. Additionally, it was announced that Carter would have his own skin and will also feature an in-game event, along with several emotes using Carter's tracks. On November 29, 2025, Carter's skin was officially revealed during the Zero Hour Event. On December 11, Carter's Fortnite bundle released.

== Discography ==
Studio albums

- Die Lit (2018)
- Whole Lotta Red (2020)
- Music (2025)

== Tours ==
=== Headlining ===
- Playboi Carti Tour (2017)
- Die Lit Tour (2018)
- Neon Tour (2018)
- King Vamp Tour (2021)
- Antagonist Tour (2025)

=== Co-headlining ===
- Left Right Tour (with Lil Uzi Vert) (2016)

=== Supporting ===
- ASAP Ferg – Turnt & Burnt (2016)
- ASAP Rocky – Injured Generation Tour (2019)
- Wiz Khalifa – Decent Exposure Summer Tour (2019)
- The Weeknd – After Hours til Dawn Tour (2025–2026)

== Awards and nominations ==
Year	Award	Nominated work	Category	Result	Ref.
2017	BET Hip Hop Awards	Himself	Best New Hip-Hop Artist	Nominated	
2017	BET Hip Hop Awards	Playboi Carti	Best Mixtape	Nominated	
2018	iHeartRadio Music Awards	Himself	Best New Hip-Hop Artist	Nominated	
2022	Grammy Awards	Donda (Kanye West, as featured artist and songwriter)	Album of the Year	Nominated	
2024	MTV Video Music Awards	"Fein" (with Travis Scott)	Best Hip Hop	Nominated	
2025	Grammy Awards	"Carnival" (¥$, as featured artist and songwriter)	Best Rap Song	Nominated	
2025	American Music Awards	"Timeless" (with the Weeknd)	Favorite R&B Song	Nominated	
2025	BET Awards	"Timeless" (with the Weeknd)	Best Collaboration	Nominated	
2025	BET Awards	"Timeless" (with the Weeknd)	Video of the Year	Nominated	
2025	BET Awards	"Type Shit" (with Future, Metro Boomin and Travis Scott)	Video of the Year	Nominated	
2026	American Music Awards	Music	Album of the Year	Nominated	
2026	American Music Awards	Music	Best Hip-Hop Album	Nominated	
2026	American Music Awards	Himself	Best Male Hip-Hop Artist	Nominated	
2026	American Music Awards	"Rather Lie" (with the Weeknd)	Best Hip-Hop Song	Nominated	
