= Off the Grid (song) =

Single by Kanye West featuring Playboi Carti and Fivio Foreign

from the album Donda
- Released: November 14, 2021
- Recorded: May 8, 2020 – August 2021
- Studio: Mercedes-Benz Stadium (Atlanta)
- Genre: Progressive rap; trap; drill
- Length: 5:39
- Label: GOOD; Def Jam
- Songwriters: Kanye West; Jordan Carter; Maxie Ryles III; Samuel Gloade; Mark Williams; Raul Cubina; Aswad Asif; David Ruoff; Elias Klughammer; Eric Sloan Jr.; Billy Walsh; Cydel Young; Malik Yusef; Orlando Wilder; Tobias Smith
- Producers: Kanye West; 30 Roc; Ojivolta; AyoAA; David x Eli; Sloane

Kanye West singles chronology
"Life of the Party" (2021)	"Off the Grid" / "Believe What I Say" (2021)	"Eazy" (2022)

Playboi Carti singles chronology
"Unlock It" (2021)	"Off the Grid" (2021)	"Popular" (2023)

Fivio Foreign singles chronology
"Panicking" (2021)	"Off the Grid" (2021)	"City of Gods" (2022)

"Off the Grid" is a song by American rapper Kanye West from his tenth studio album Donda (2021). The song features vocals from Playboi Carti and Fivio Foreign, with choir vocals performed by opera singer Justin Austin. It was released to US urban contemporary radio stations as the album's fourth single on November 30, 2021 (third promoted to radio formats).

== Background and recording ==
On July 18, 2020, West announced Donda on his Twitter and posted a track listing that had "Off the Grid" on it.

In December, it was revealed that West was recording and executive producing for Playboi Carti's album Whole Lotta Red, which released on December 25. Playboi Carti recorded his verse for "Off the Grid" during these sessions. A snippet of Playboi Carti's part leaked after West played the song on his speakers during his stay at a hotel in Belgium in December. The collaboration with Fivio Foreign came together after West asked Fivio Foreign to come to Mercedes Benz Stadium on the night before the August 5 listening party. Talking about the collaboration, Fivio Foreign recalled:

He gave me my space, but every eight couple bars, "I'm like yo look, I got some shit" and he's like, "Yo, keep going". That’s why it is so long, he kept telling me to keep going, keep going like three times. Like how much more, "Just keep going". [...] I was playing a couple of songs, and he was like "Who produced this?", and I'm like my man AyoAA – Ozzy, and he's like "Get him on a plane, get him out here". The "Off the Grid" shit was already done, he sent me that beat before I even met him. It wasn't drill. He got my producer Ozzy to add the drill to the song on my part.

The song was first officially previewed at the August 5 listening party at Mercedes Benz Stadium. It was previewed again in Soldier Field on August 26, with an added verse from West at the end. "Off the Grid" also had a Pusha T reference verse that West stated to be "too-Black Lives Matter", describing it as "worse than the devil", as revealed in the 2025 documentary In Whose Name?.

== Contents ==
The song contains a sampling of Pastoral Suite 10 (1978) by Jean Clero and the Polish Radio Orchestra. The identification of the sample was not given by West or his recording studio and was identified online by user 'SAMV1sion' in August 2025.

== Reception ==
The song received positive reviews from critics and fans, who widely considered it to be one of the best songs from the album. The track was named the best song of 2021 by Complex. Matthew Ritchie on Pitchfork reviewed the song with a positive outcome, especially praising Fivio Foreign's vocals. Rob Harvilla on The Ringer Described the song as "an impressively claustrophobic Brooklyn drill excursion".

== Credits and personnel ==
Credits adapted from Tidal.

- Kanye West – production, vocals
- Playboi Carti – vocals
- Fivio Foreign – vocals
- 30 Roc – production
- AyoAA – production
- Ojivolta – production
- David & Eli – co-production
- Sloane – additional production
- Irko – mastering, mixing
- Alejandro Rodriguez-Dawsøn – recording
- Drrique Rendeer – recording
- James Kelso – recording
- Josh Berg – recording
- Lorenzo Wolff – recording
- Mikalai Skrobat – recording
- Roark Bailey – recording
- Will Chason – recording
- Louis Bell – vocal editing
- Patrick Hundley – vocal editing

== Charts ==
=== Weekly charts ===
Weekly chart performance for "Off the Grid"
Chart (2021)	Peak position
Australia (ARIA)	9
Austria (Ö3 Austria Top 40)	36
Canada Hot 100 (Billboard)	7
Czech Republic Singles Digital (ČNS IFPI)	40
Denmark (Tracklisten)	14
France (SNEP)	44
Global 200 (Billboard)	7
Greece International (IFPI)	21
Hungary (Stream Top 40)	35
Iceland (Tónlistinn)	10
Ireland (IRMA)	11
Italy (FIMI)	58
Lithuania (AGATA)	17
Netherlands (Single Top 100)	38
New Zealand (Recorded Music NZ)	7
Norway (VG-lista)	22
Portugal (AFP)	22
Slovakia Singles Digital (ČNS IFPI)	21
South Africa (TOSAC)	5
Sweden (Sverigetopplistan)	30
Switzerland (Schweizer Hitparade)	17
UK Singles (Official Charts)	15
UK Hip Hop/R&B (Official Charts)	7
US Billboard Hot 100	11
US Hot Christian Songs (Billboard)	3
US Gospel Songs (Billboard)	2
US Hot R&B/Hip-Hop Songs (Billboard)	4

=== Monthly charts ===
Monthly chart performance for "Off the Grid"
Chart (August 2021)	Peak position
Greece International Digital Singles (IFPI)	56

=== Year-end charts ===
2021 year-end chart performance for "Off the Grid"
Chart (2021)	Position
US Christian Songs (Billboard)	11
US Gospel Songs (Billboard)	3

== Certifications ==
Region	Certification	Certified units/sales
Canada (Music Canada)	Gold	40,000^{‡}
Poland (ZPAV)	Gold	25,000^{‡}
New Zealand (RMNZ)	Gold	15,000^{‡}
United Kingdom (BPI)	Silver	200,000^{‡}
United States (RIAA)	Platinum	1,000,000^{‡}
^{‡} Sales+streaming figures based on certification alone.
