= Junya (song) =

2021 song by Kanye West

Song by Kanye West

from the album Donda
- Released: August 29, 2021
- Recorded: May 26 – August 2021
- Genre: Gospel; trap
- Length: 2:28
- Label: GOOD; Def Jam
- Songwriters: Kanye West; Jordan Carter; Nasir Pemberton; Mark Williams; Raul Cubina; Roark Bailey; Billy Walsh; Cydel Young; Malik Yusef; Terrence Thornton; Warren Trotter; Dexter Mills; Rennard East
- Producers: Kanye West; Digital Nas; Ojivolta

"Junya" is a song by American rapper Kanye West from his tenth studio album, Donda (2021). The song features vocals from rapper Playboi Carti. Lyrically, the rappers pay tribute to Junya Watanabe and reference their watches made by him. The song's second part, "Junya pt 2", was also included on the album and features vocals from Ty Dolla Sign.

== Background ==
The song serves as a tribute to Japanese designer Junya Watanabe from West and Playboi Carti, who boast of their watches made by him. "Junya" also features West referencing Giannis Antetokounmpo of the basketball team Milwaukee Bucks, who had won Game 6 of the 2021 NBA Finals around the same time the song was first previewed during a listening party for the album at Atlanta's Mercedes-Benz Stadium in July. In June 2023, footage leaked to Instagram of West and Playboi Carti working on the song in the studio. The footage reportedly came from the rapper's unreleased documentary for Donda and shows him at the starting stage for the album. After having been mentioned in the song, Watanabe became more relevant across fashion culture. The song contains a diss towards Canadian musician Drake from West as he alludes to the delayed 2021 release of Certified Lover Boy and declares: "Why can't losers never lose in peace?/Ain't nobody 'round me losing sleep." This stands along with "Pure Souls" as one of the multiple occasions that West dissed Drake on the record.

== Pt 2 ==
"Junya pt 2"

Song by Kanye West

from the album Donda
- Released: August 29, 2021
- Length: 2:28
- Label: GOOD; Def Jam
- Songwriters: Kanye West; Jordan Carter; Tyrone Griffin Jr.; Nasir Pemberton; Mark Williams; Raul Cubina; Roark Bailey; Billy Walsh; Cydel Young; Malik Yusef; Terrence Thornton; Warren Trotter; Dexter Mills; Rennard East
- Producers: Kanye West; Digital Nas; Ojivolta

A second part of the song was released under the title of "Junya pt 2" as part of Donda on August 29, 2021. The track maintained the same producers as original, with vocals from American singer Ty Dolla Sign added. West had previously guested Ty Dolla Sign on his tracks "Only One" (2014), "Real Friends" (2016), and "Everything We Need" (2019), while the singer featured him on his 2020 single "Ego Death" and “Track 6” both from the singer’s third album Featuring Ty Dolla Sign (2020). "Junya pt 2" marked West and Ty Dolla Sign's last collaboration until Vultures 1 in 2024, their debut studio album released as ¥$. Upon its release, the song charted at number 88 on the ARIA Charts in Australia, and peaked at number 47 in South Africa.

== Charts ==
=== Weekly charts ===
Chart performance for "Junya"
Chart (2021)	Peak position
Australia (ARIA)	30
Canada Hot 100 (Billboard)	16
France (SNEP)	132
Global 200 (Billboard)	13
Iceland (Tónlistinn)	32
Lithuania (AGATA)	47
Portugal (AFP)	65
Slovakia (Singles Digitál Top 100)	81
South Africa (TOSAC)	16
Sweden (Sverigetopplistan)	88
US Billboard Hot 100	16
US Hot Christian Songs (Billboard)	5
US Gospel Songs (Billboard)	5
US Hot R&B/Hip-Hop Songs (Billboard)	6

Chart performance for "Junya pt 2"
Chart (2021)	Peak position
Australia (ARIA)	88
South Africa (TOSAC)	47

=== Year-end charts ===
2021 year-end chart performance for "Junya"
Chart (2021)	Position
US Christian Songs (Billboard)	30
US Gospel Songs (Billboard)	9
