= Street Lights (song) =

2008 song by Kanye West

Song by Kanye West

from the album 808s and Heartbreak
- Released: November 24, 2008
- Recorded: 2008
- Studio: Glenwood (Burbank, California); Avex Recording (Honolulu, Hawaii)
- Genre: Pop
- Length: 3:09
- Label: Roc-A-Fella; Def Jam
- Songwriters: Kanye West; Jenny-Bea Englishman; Antony Williams; Benjamin McIldowie
- Producer: Kanye West

"Street Lights" (also called "Streetlights") is a song by American rapper Kanye West from his fourth studio album, 808s & Heartbreak (2008). The song features background vocals from Esthero and Tony Williams. It was produced by West and co-produced by Mr Hudson. The producers co-wrote the song with Esthero and Williams. For the song, West was inspired by driving past street lights. A pop piano ballad with indie pop elements, it features shoegaze synths. Lyrically, West references street lights passing by like memories and time.

"Street Lights" received generally positive reviews from music critics, who often praised the composition. Some were complimentary towards West's vocals, while other critics noted the song's emotional appeal. Retrospectively, this song has been universally acclaimed, being considered one of West's most emotional and underrated songs. An accompanying music video premiered on June 29, 2009. In the video, West drives around on the search for a destination that he fails to reach. West performed the song live during The Yeezus Tour in 2013. He and the Sunday Service Choir perform an acoustic rendition of it in his film Jesus Is King (2019). The song has been subject to cover versions by Ruby Amanfu, Daniel Caesar, and Stars.

== Background ==
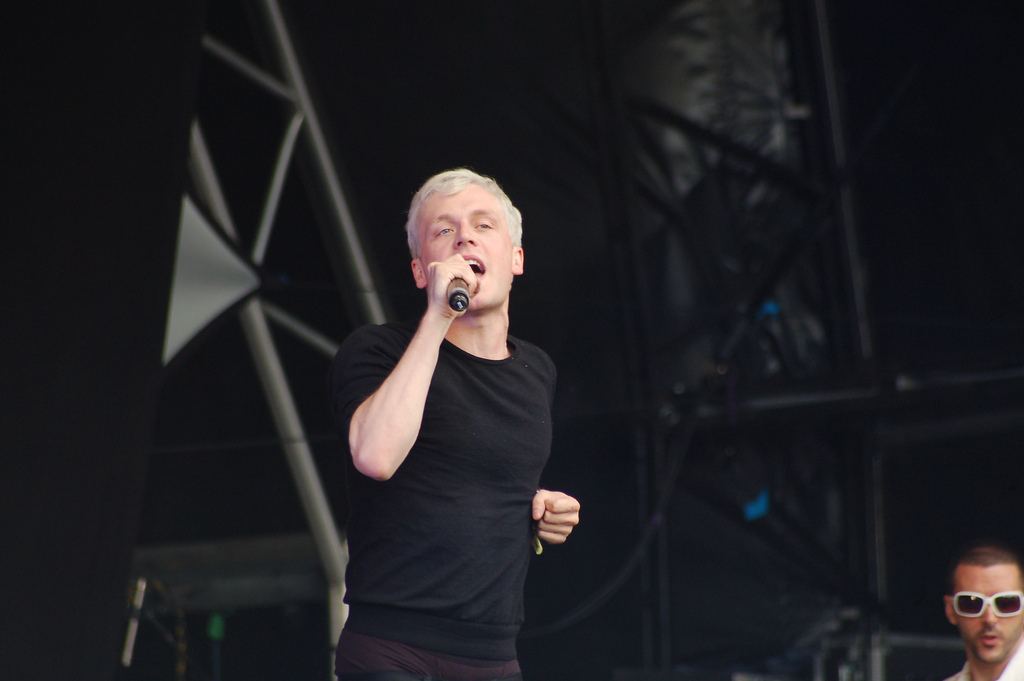
Mr Hudson contributed both writing and production to the song, after being contacted by West over the phone.

The song was produced by West, with co-production from English musician Mr Hudson; the two wrote it alongside backing vocalists Esthero and Tony Williams. The musician was involved with other 808s & Heartbreak tracks, contributing a feature to "Paranoid" and co-writing "Say You Will". Mr Hudson was on vacation in Paris when he received a phone call from West, who was drawn in by his charm. After the musician's work on the album, West signed him to his record label GOOD Music. Mr Hudson released his debut studio album Straight No Chaser under the label in October 2009, with West contributing vocals on the single "Supernova". Speaking with Slate in 2013, West explained that he took inspiration for "Street Lights" from "driving around watching these street light's [sic] passing". Continuing, West recalled having the realization that "each one was transitory" and "that's what life was". He clarified that he did not mean any sort of disrespect towards the Buddha, but humbly believed "right there I figured it out".

On November 12, 2008, the song experienced a leak. "Street Lights" was recorded during the three-week period that West worked on the entirety of 808s & Heartbreak in 2008. West has often used the word "light" or the plural version of it in his song titles, first doing so with the single "Flashing Lights" in 2007. He also pays reference to flashing lights on the song, rapping about being "flashed by the paparazzi". The inclusion of "Street Lights" on 808s & Heartbreak in 2008 marked the second time West released a track with a version of the word in its title, while the lyrics include him directly mentioning street lights. West continued the "light" theme with the inclusion of "All of the Lights" on his fifth studio album My Beautiful Dark Twisted Fantasy (2010); the lyrics also see him speak of street lights. Three songs with a version of the word in the title were released on West's seventh studio album The Life of Pablo in 2016: "Ultralight Beam", "Low Lights", "Highlights". As of February 2016, West has yet to comment on his usage of "light" and the plural version for song titling.

== Composition and lyrics ==
"Street Lights"
An 18-second sample of "Street Lights", featuring West singing through Auto-Tune in a distorted voice. He paints street lights as passing by similarly to memories and time, being accompanied by instrumentation that consists of shoegaze synths, tom-tom drums, keyboards, and a backing guitar.

Musically, "Street Lights" is a pop piano ballad, with elements of indie pop. According to Uncut, the song is set in the time signature of 6/8. The song prominently contains shoegaze synths, while a guitar appears in the background. Tom-tom drums are heavily featured, on which its sparse groove relies. The song includes slow keyboard chords, played by frequent West collaborator Jeff Bhasker. For the opening, piano is utilized. Going along with the rest of the album, Auto-Tune is heavily deployed on West's voice throughout, with his vocals having distortion added. At certain points, a distorted vocal track succeeds West's voice and echoes him. After the minute-and-a-half point of the song, lush layers of background vocals from Esthero and Williams come in, who deliver harmonies.

In the lyrics of the track, West refers to street lights passing by in a similar manner to memories and time. Kanye also uses the lights as a metaphor for his sadness, alluding to the death of his mother Donda West. The track opens with a stanza from Kanye West: "Let me know / Do I still got time to grow / Things ain't always set in stone / That being known let me know / Let me". West confesses that even though he knows his destination, he is "just not there" in the streets. At the end of the track, West sings "Life's just not fair".

== Release and reception ==
On November 24, 2008, "Street Lights" was released as the eighth track on West's fourth studio album 808s & Heartbreak. The song was met with generally positive reviews from music critics, with many praising the composition. Scott Plagenhoef from Pitchfork pointed out the song's "relatively busy sounds" as being "among the sonic highlights" of the album, while also naming it one of the best songs. Jody Rosen of Rolling Stone commented that the song features "a haze of distortion" floating over "tolling keyboard chords and a hammering beat". Writing for The A.V. Club, Nathan Rabin appreciated the song as "heartbreakingly delicate". The Washington Post's Chris Richards characterized the song as a lot better than fellow album track "RoboCop", finding the former to be "wistful" and viewing West as a "beleaguered protagonist" who attempts escaping "into the back seat of a cab only to arrive at another emotional dead end". He continued, comparing the distorted vocal track that retracts West's syllables on "Street Lights" to "a digital shadow", as well as listing the song among the tracks from 808s & Heartbreak to download.

Dave Heaton from PopMatters stated the lyrics that have the most emotional impact on 808s & Heartbreak are "sung the most straight", primarily noticing these on "Street Lights", going on to call the song "the comedown" and "a moment of mellow" after the album's previous three tracks. He further noticed the song is its "most precise and impressive channeling of the mood", expressing that the references to street lights passing evoke feelings of "a resolution of sorts" and observing West's progression from some of his "name-calling". Heaton stated the main part of the song is the music "being brilliantly odd" due to "a wavering keyboard sound that almost resembles the noisy feedback of an experimental rock band" being used emotionally in a lingering melancholy manner, with West enabling the keyboard fading into the background while also stopping "to shine a light on it". He analyzed that the keyboard usage takes the song to still motion to "highlight the feeling" and noticed how "[l]ush" backing vocals run alongside the instrumentation, "absorbing" and complimenting the strangeness, thus leading to "Street Lights" being "tender as it [should] be". Concluding his review, Heaton opined that West does not appear "worked with musical clichés" when the song is compared to other ballads by hip hop artists, writing he puts "his own spin" on "the lonely-hearted ballad" form and includes a "depth of sound that generates a depth of feeling".

Dan Cairns of The Sunday Times observed that West's "emotional candour" is highly personal, making listening to the song seemingly "almost voyeuristic". The staff of NME lauded the song over the emotion, calling it "an endearingly broken-sounding 'where am I in life?' cold-soul heel-scuffer". IGN critic Alfred H. Leonard, III listed the song among the ones on 808s & Heartbreak that are worthy of downloading. A few reviews of the song were negative. For Slant Magazine, Wilson McBee estimated that the song would likely be "nothing more than harmless balladry" if performed by either one of American singer-songwriters Ne-Yo and The-Dream, "but under West's awkward, wistful ownership" it turns out to be "not palatable". Steve Jones was dismissive of the song at USA Today; he selected it as the album's track that should be skipped.

== Music video and promotion ==
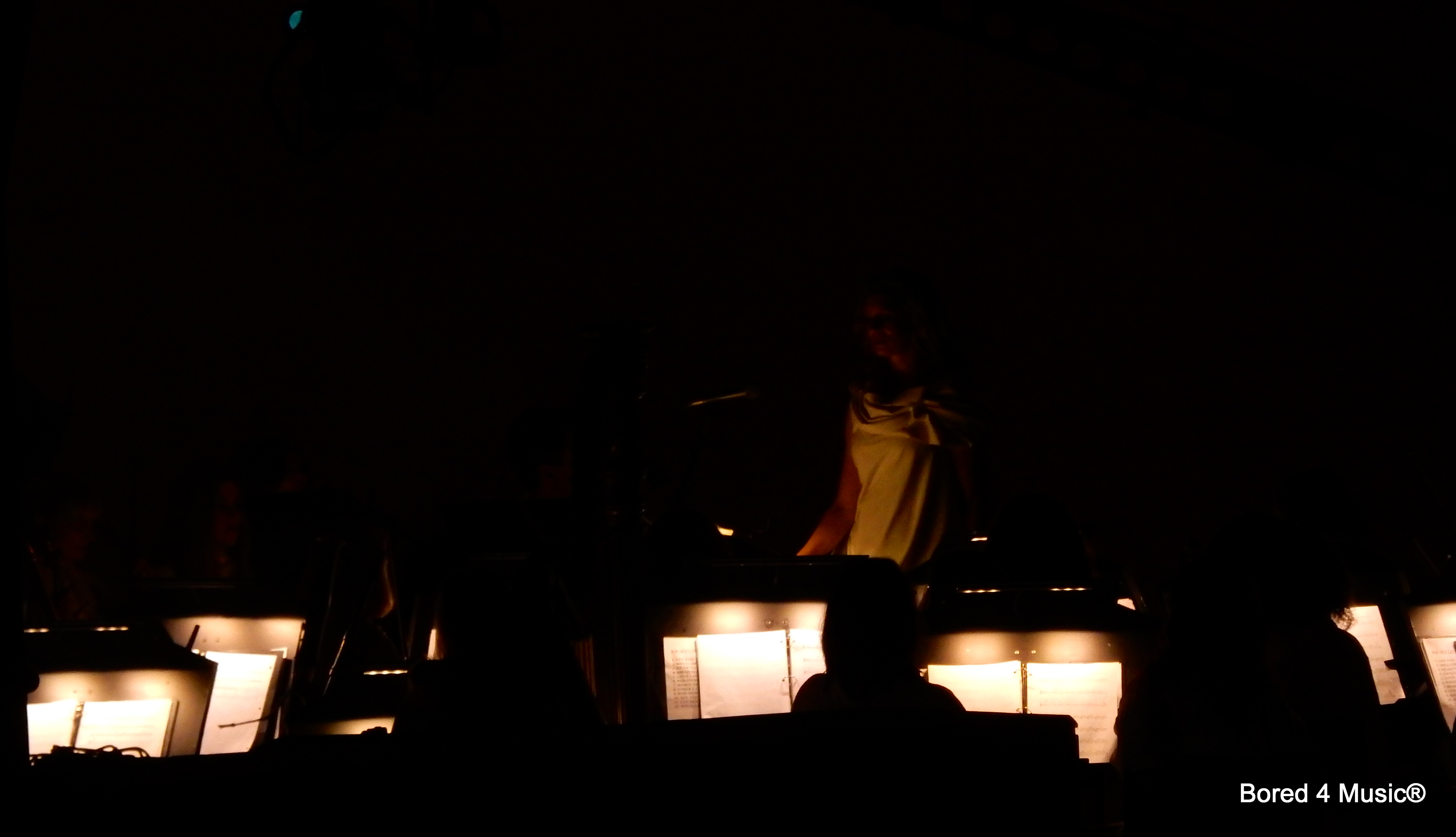
West was backed by an orchestra during his performance of the song at the 2015 Hollywood Bowl.

On June 29, 2009, West shared a music video for "Street Lights" via his blog. It was directed and created by Spanish designer Javier Longobardo. The video is computer animated and features West driving a car through a deserted metropolis, searching for a destination that he never reaches. The graphics of the music video uses polygon shapes, similar to the shapes used by the PlayStation console. According to Tom Breihan of Pitchfork, the video looks similar to "one of those pastel 80s beach-party T-shirts [having] come to computer-animated life".

West performed the song during his show for VH1 in February 2009. However, the performance was not originally broadcast on the network. Instead, it was included as the eleventh performance on the DVD of West's second live album VH1 Storytellers on January 5, 2010, being added as a bonus clip. On October 19, 2013, West performed the track from a giant mountain during The Yeezus Tour's kickoff show at Key Arena in Seattle, Washington. The track was performed for West's first concert in New York City on the tour, which was at the Barclay's Center on November 19, 2013. Four days later, West performed the song for a concert at the city's Madison Square Garden on The Yeezus Tour, before he delivered a rant. For West's two night concert of 808s & Heartbreak in full at the 2015 Hollywood Bowl in September, he performed the song as the eighth track of his set. This marked West's first performance of the song since November 2013; he wore loose garments in white and off-white shades while performing. West had backing from a small band and a medium-sized orchestra, and the theatre was covered with stop-sign red light for the song.

== Appearances in media ==
"Street Lights" was part of the soundtrack for a season of American medical drama television series Grey's Anatomy. In 2016, West's former wife Kim Kardashian included the song on a playlist of her 28 favourite songs from him. Make-up artist Pat McGrath shared a promotional clip for her eye kit Dark Star 006 in 2017 as part of her In The Mirror series, which included an appearance from Kardashian. The 73 seconds long clip featured a stylized very-high resolution filter and soundtrack set to "Street Lights".

In an interview for All Def Music in 2018, rapper Juice Wrld recalled singing the song as if he "had shit to be sad about" and classified West as "a time traveler". He continued, asserting that West "went to damn near 2015 and came back with some sauce". West released his concert film Jesus Is King simultaneously with his ninth studio album of the same name on October 25, 2019, the former of which features him and his gospel group the Sunday Service Choir performing a stripped-down acoustic rendition of "Street Lights". West sings in a worn-out quiet voice as he is accompanied by a piano and an organ, and he dresses in a brown attire. The camera slowly circles around him and the group during their performance in an underground church while dusk falls, with West using a broom for sweeping.

== Cover versions ==
American R&B singer Ruby Amanfu shared her cover version of "Street Lights" to SoundCloud on June 23, 2015. Amanfu told Rolling Stone that during the first night of her five-day period residing in a Tennessee log cabin, she discussed with her six-piece band how "we were going to flip" the song "on its head", with the singer setting out "to turn it into a waltz" while trying to avoid overthinking things. This led to Amanfu and the band merely following their instincts; she recalled having "sang to candlelight only and we just went for it", recording three takes of the cover and ultimately using the last one. Amanfu explained that the original resonates with her due to serving as a reminder "of those moments in life when time can present itself as a curse instead of a blessing", later stating how she can "hope that those streetlights guide you to the destination you're hoping for". A soulful rendition, the cover replaces the original's synths with sparse piano. A cover version of "Street Lights" was released by fellow R&B singer Daniel Caesar under the title of "Streetcar" on his second EP Pilgrim's Paradise on November 12, 2015. The first half of the cover is reliant on piano that accompanies Daniel Caesar's voice, before drums come in and a guitar is featured alongside his falsetto.

On February 17, 2016, Canadian indie pop band Stars posted a chamber pop cover version to SoundCloud with the same title as the original. In a press release regarding their cover, frontman Torquil Campbell clarified that the subjects of "[n]ighttime, street lights, isolation, despair, [and] the romance of being alone" are often sung about by the band, "so tackling Kanye West's beautiful evocation of all these things seemed natural". He further called it West's "most starsy song", as well as assuming that "sad Kanye is everyone's favorite Kanye". Stars posted a note about the cover to SoundCloud in reference to West: "we do a slightly better version of streetlights than he does. " The cover replaces the original's synths with an entirely new piano melody.

== Credits and personnel ==
Information taken from 808s & Heartbreak liner notes.

Recording

- Recorded at Glenwood Studios (Burbank, California) and Avex Recording Studio (Honolulu, Hawaii)

Personnel

- Kanye West – songwriter, producer
- Mr Hudson – songwriter, co-producer
- Esthero – songwriter, background vocals
- Tony Williams – songwriter, background vocals
- Andrew Dawson – recorder
- Anthony Kilhoffer – recorder
- Chad Carlisle – assistant recorder
- Isha Erskine – assistant recorder
- Gaylord Holomalia – assistant recorder
- Christian Mochizuki – assistant recorder
- Manny Marroquin – mix engineer
- Christian Plata – assistant engineer
- Erik Madrid – assistant engineer
- Jeff Bhasker – keyboards

== Certifications ==
Certifications for "Street Lights"
Region	Certification	Certified units/sales
United States (RIAA)	Gold	500,000^{‡}
^{‡} Sales+streaming figures based on certification alone.
