= Low Lights =

2016 song by Kanye West

Song by Kanye West

from the album The Life of Pablo
- Released: February 14, 2016
- Genre: Gospel
- Length: 2:11
- Label: GOOD; Def Jam
- Songwriters: West; Mike Dean; Jerome Potter; Samuel Griesemer; Sandy Rivera
- Producers: West; DJDS; Dean (add.)

"Low Lights" (also spelled "Lowlights") is a song by American recording artist Kanye West from his seventh studio album, The Life of Pablo (2016). It was produced by West, DJDS and Mike Dean, while the lyrics were written by West, Dean, Jerome Potter, Samuel Griesemer and Sandy Rivera. DJDS worked on the album for three consecutive weeks after meeting West, with the latter sharing a snippet of the song on Saturday Night Live the day before release in February 2016.

The vocals used in "Low Lights" are sampled from the a cappella version of "So Alive" by Kings of Tomorrow. A gospel track that looks at spirituality and references God throughout, "Low Lights" is the sixth track on The Life of Pablo, and leads into "Highlights". The song received positive reviews from music critics, commending its religious nature. Alicia Keys sampled the song in her 2017 track "That's What's Up". "Low Lights" charted at number 22 on the US Billboard Bubbling Under Hot 100 in 2016.

== Background ==
"Low Lights" was co-produced by DJDS, a production duo consisting of Jerome LOL and Samo Sound Boy. They co-wrote the song along with West, Dean and Sandy Rivera. DJDS also co-produced The Life of Pablo tracks "Ultralight Beam", "Father Stretch My Hands, Pt. 1", "Freestyle 4" and "Fade". In an interview with Billboard, Samo Sound Boy explained how they became involved with West: "A bunch of different people from his team just reached out on Facebook, Twitter DM, and it basically said Kanye West requests your presence tomorrow." After meeting West, DJDS worked on his then-upcoming album for three consecutive weeks. West explained "the gospel nature of it" to the duo, with the gospel elements of their work making sense out of West wanting to collaborate. Samo Sound Boy revealed that every song was being worked on at the same time and that the recording process "wasn't a really systematic way." Jerome LOL named West as one of DJDS' biggest inspirations and claimed for their sampling style to be "directly influenced by his old production." The rapper discovered the duo in January 2016. West had previously used the word "light" in the titles of his tracks "Flashing Lights", "Street Lights" and "All of the Lights". It further makes appearance on The Life of Pablo tracks "Ultralight Beam" and "Highlights" as well as "Low Lights".

== Composition and production ==
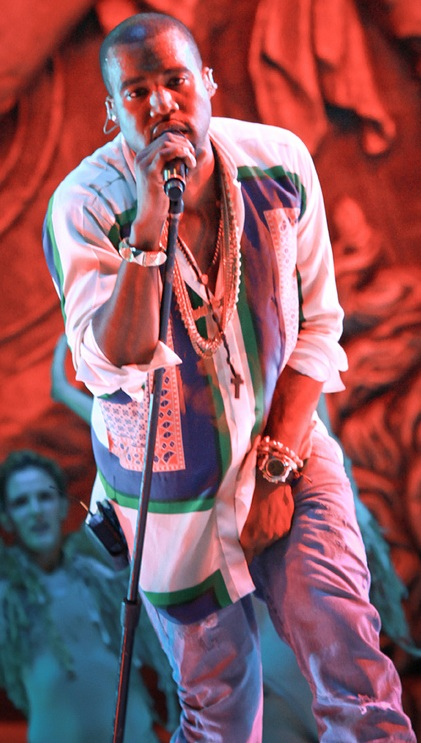
West (pictured in 2011) co-wrote and co-produced "Low Lights", but does not provide vocals on the track.

"Low Lights" is a gospel track that includes similar elements to the album's opener "Ultralight Beam". It contains a sample of the a cappella version of "So Alive" by American dance duo Kings of Tomorrow for the entirety of it, which is layered over piano chords and synth bass production. The vocals are not by West but by an unknown woman who was sampled for "So Alive". Throughout "Low Lights", the woman is heard preaching about God and his connection to spirituality. Lyrically, a descriptive picture is painted of faith in God by her and the miracles that will one day be created for her in life by the lord. This message is related to the spirituality that West's mother Donda taught him, as well as to the religious themes found throughout his career. Such themes are also included on The Life of Pablo, and the message speaks to the spirituality which helps people stay strong during their lives. The song concludes with a final dedication to Jesus by Rivera.

"Low Lights" precedes "Highlights" on The Life of Pablo, serving as an intro to the track. The transition from the track's Bible references to those in "Highlights" suggests that West attributes his success to his spirituality.

== Release and promotion ==
"Low Lights" was released on February 14, 2016, as the sixth track on West's seventh studio album, The Life of Pablo through GOOD Music and Def Jam Recordings. The day before the album's release, during his appearance on Saturday Night Live, West played a snippet of the song while he stood onstage by himself. West segued from the snippet into a performance of "Highlights" joined by Young Thug, El DeBarge, Kelly Price and The-Dream. The song was one of five that West added to The Life of Pablo's tracklist on the day of release. During a Twitter rant in February 2016, West sent out various tweets related to the album. He explained the song's presence, tweeting: "I put Lowlights [sic] on my album just thinking about all the moms driving they kids [sic] to school then going to work…" On November 1, 2016, West performed it live at The Forum in Inglewood, California, as part of the Saint Pablo Tour.

== Reception ==
"Low Lights" met with positive reviews from music critics, who praised the religious nature. Alexis Petridis of The Guardian described the song, along with fellow album tracks "Ultralight Beam" and "Highlights", as not feeling "episodic so much as fractured." Ej Moreno of Monkeys Fighting Robots labeled it as being a "gospel-heavy song" and a "powerful track." Iyana Robertson of Vibe wrote that "a passionate testimony of deliverance is shared with West's congregation." Zach Schonfeld of Newsweek viewed the song as what "comes in the form of a spoken testimony to Christ." When Premier Gospel looked into The Life of Pablo possibly being the gospel album of 2016, Jamie of the site voiced the belief that if "Low Lights", "Jesus Walks" or fellow album track "Ultralight Beam" had been put out by anyone else, then "we'd be hailing them as the new hero of gospel music." Jamie claimed that the song "is basically just a prayer." When reviewing the eponymous album by Kids See Ghosts, the duo of West and Kid Cudi, in June 2018, Kiana Fitzgerald of Complex looked back on the presence of "Low Lights" on The Life of Pablo as "the closest the entire album comes to gospel."

In the same week that the album was released, "Low Lights" debuted at number 22 on the US Billboard Bubbling Under Hot 100 and lasted for one week. Alongside its debut on the Bubbling Under Hot 100, the track peaked at number 1 on the US Bubbling Under R&B/Hip-Hop Singles chart and spent a total of two weeks on it. The track opened at number 134 on the UK Singles Chart.

== Other usage ==
American singer-songwriter Alicia Keys sampled the track's monologue in her 2017 song "That's What's Up", from her album Here (2018). An accompanying music video for the song was shared by Keys on January 25, 2017, which includes her lounging and dipping in a bathtub.

== Credits and personnel ==
Credits adapted from West's official website.

- Production – Kanye West and DJDS
- Additional production – Mike Dean
- Engineering – Noah Goldstein, Andrew Dawson, Anthony Kilhoffer and Dean
- Mix engineer – Manny Marroquin at Larrabee Studios, North Hollywood, California
- Mix assistants – Chris Galland, Ike Schultz and Jeff Jackson

== Charts ==
Chart (2016)	Peak position
UK Singles (OCC)	134
UK Hip Hop/R&B (Official Charts)	40
US Bubbling Under Hot 100 (Billboard)	22
US Bubbling Under R&B/Hip-Hop Singles (Billboard)	1
US On-Demand Streaming Songs (Billboard)	49

== Certifications ==
Region	Certification	Certified units/sales
United States (RIAA)	Gold	500,000^{‡}
^{‡} Sales+streaming figures based on certification alone.
