= Feedback (Kanye West song) =

Song by Kanye West

from the album The Life of Pablo
- Released: February 14, 2016
- Recorded: July 18, 2014 – 2016
- Studio: Larrabee (North Hollywood)
- Genre: Hip hop
- Length: 2:27
- Label: GOOD; Def Jam
- Songwriters: West; Ernest Brown; Noah Goldstein; Cydel Young; Darius Jenkins; K. Rachel Mills; Marcus Byrd; Chancelor Bennett; Ardalan Sarfaraz; Manouchehr Cheshmazar
- Producers: West; Charlie Heat (co.); Goldstein (co.)

"Feedback" is a song by American rapper Kanye West from his seventh studio album, The Life of Pablo (2016). It includes a sample of "Talagh" by Googoosh, and West raps about his career experiences. The song charted on both the US Billboard Hot 100 and UK Singles Chart at number 99 and 92 respectively in 2016.

== Composition ==
The song features a sample of 1975 track "Talagh" by Iranian singer Googoosh, which is used throughout it. Within the track, West raps about the fame and success that he has experienced throughout his career.

During the timespan of updates for The Life of Pablo had been finished by June 2016, "Feedback" saw revamped production, resulting in a longer running time than its original length.

== Release ==
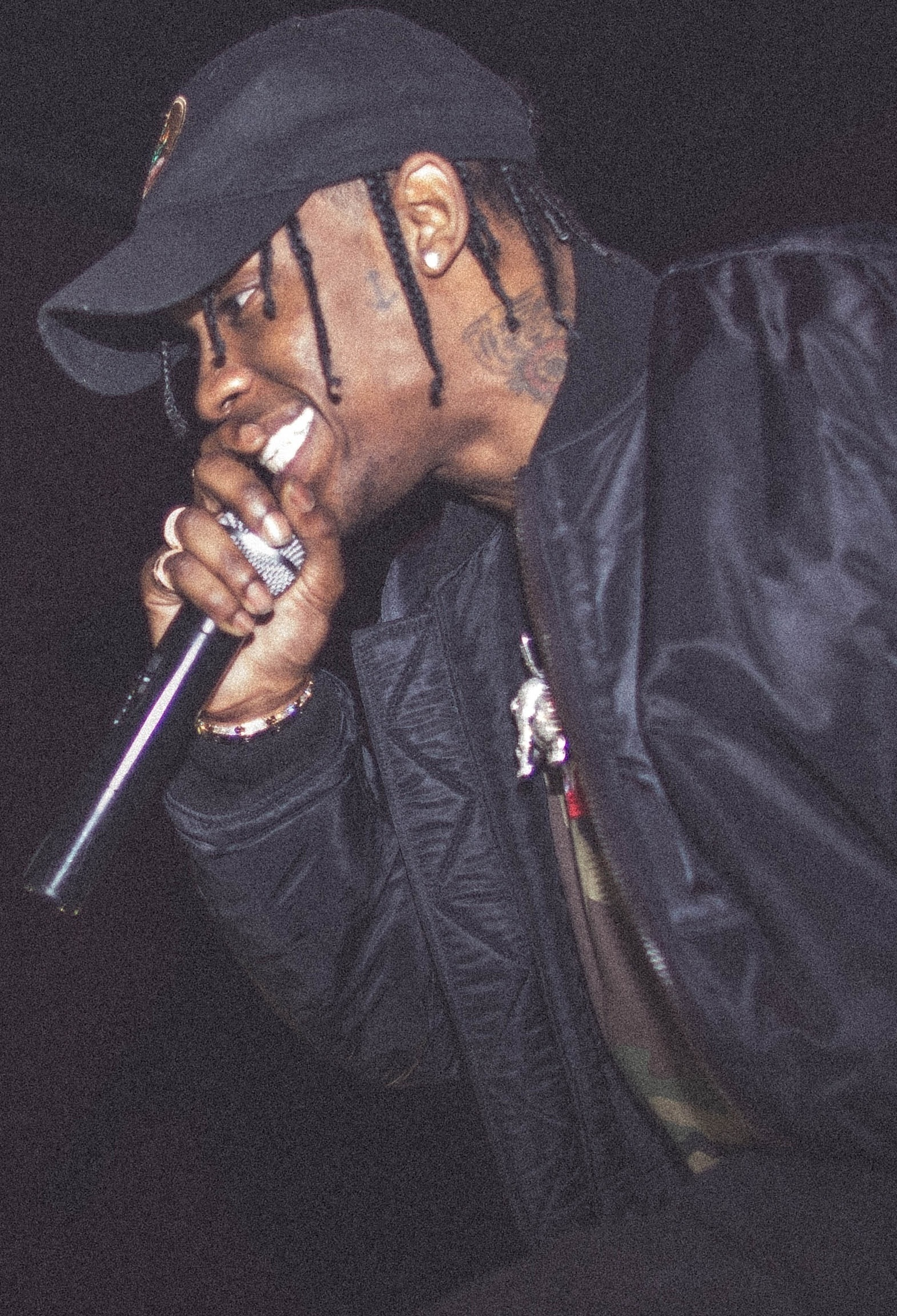
Travis Scott thanked West for keeping "Feedback" on The Life of Pablo.

In May 2015, an attendee at one of West's fashion presentations posted a snippet of "Feedback" being played online. After the snippet was posted, the song was rumored to be titled either "Good News" or "A Long Time". It was also rumored to be released as part of West's then-upcoming album, at the time titled Swish. The song was intended to be scrapped from The Life of Pablo at one point, as Travis Scott took to Twitter to thank West for keeping the track on the album, coming after the latter released the album's the final track listing. When the song was originally released to Tidal, it was accidentally titled "Freestyle 4", with the latter also mistakenly being titled "Feedback".

== Critical reception ==
"Feedback" received generally positive reviews from music critics. Writing for The Guardian, Alexis Petridis believed the song showed West as self-aware, describing it as him "wondering aloud whether he's actually gone round the twist". Philip Lewis of Mic complimented the confidence shown by West on the track. NME's Luke Morgran Britton compared the song's "urgency and atonal" to that of West's 2013 album Yeezus, writing that "Yeezy returning back to his freestyle roots will excite old school fans bewildered by everything he’s done post-808s & Heartbreak." (Note: Review swaps the names of "Feedback" and "Freestyle 4") For Noisey Vice, Nick Greene responded to West's "name one genius that ain't crazy" line by describing Paul Newman as "a genius who wasn't crazy", although still praised "Feedback" as "a very good song". At Paste, Ryan Reed called the track "a hypnotic, erratic highlight" of the album.

== Commercial performance ==
"Feedback" made its debut at number 99 on the US Billboard Hot 100 upon The Life of Pablo being released, but never managed chart again at any later date. As for the UK Singles Chart, it did the same there, debuting at number 92 upon the album's release and never reaching the top 100 again afterwards. In the same week as its debut on the Billboard Hot 100, the track debuted at number 36 on the US Hot R&B/Hip-Hop Songs chart. It fell down 10 places to number 46 the next week, then disappeared from the chart permanently.

== Credits and personnel ==
Credits adapted from West's official website.

- Producer – Kanye West
- Co-producers – Charlie Heat and Noah Goldstein
- Recording engineers – Goldstein, Andrew Dawson, Anthony Kilhoffer and Dean
- Mix engineer – Manny Marroquin at Larrabee Studios, North Hollywood, California
- Mix assistants – Chris Galland, Ike Schultz and Jeff Jackson

== Charts ==
Chart (2016)	Peak position
Sweden Heatseeker (Sverigetopplistan)	19
UK Singles (Official Charts)	92
UK Hip Hop/R&B (Official Charts)	27
US Billboard Hot 100	99
US Hot R&B/Hip-Hop Songs (Billboard)	36

== Certifications ==
Region	Certification	Certified units/sales
United States (RIAA)	Gold	500,000^{‡}
^{‡} Sales+streaming figures based on certification alone.
