= FML (song) =

Song by Kanye West

from the album The Life of Pablo
- Released: February 14, 2016
- Recorded: 2015–16
- Genre: Hip hop; progressive rap; alternative hip hop
- Length: 3:56
- Label: GOOD; Def Jam
- Songwriters: West; Abel Tesfaye; Cydel Young; Mike Dean; Andrew Dawson; Noah Goldstein; Leland Wayne; Ernest Brown; Christian Boggs; Darius Jenkins; K. Rachel Mills; Marcus Byrd; Ross Matthew Birchard; Jacques Webster; Lawrence Cassidy; Vincent Cassidy; Paul Wiggin
- Producers: West; Mitus; Metro Boomin (Note: Credited as co-producer); Goldstein; Dean; Hudson Mohawke (Note: Credited as additional producer); Dawson

"FML" is a song by American rapper Kanye West from his seventh studio album The Life of Pablo (2016), which features vocals from Canadian singer the Weeknd. It contains a sample of "Hit" by Section 25, which two of the band members praised West for sampling. In the song, West references his issues with mental health. The song charted in the United States, United Kingdom and Canada in 2016.

== Background ==
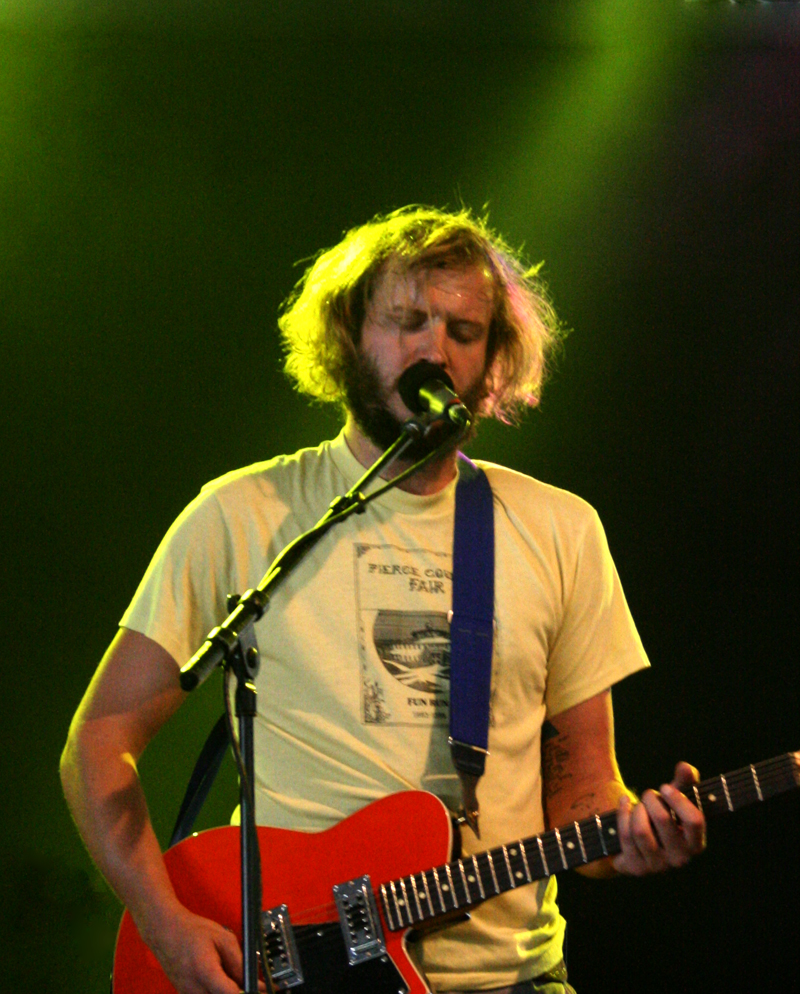
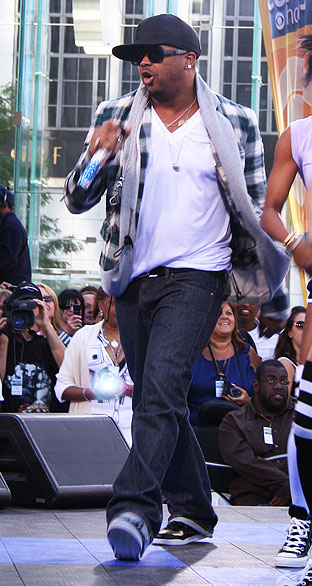
Bon Iver (left) and The-Dream (right) are featured on "Fall Out of Heaven", a demo that was repurposed for "FML"

In October 2016, a demo of the track, alongside one of "I Am a God" from West's sixth studio album Yeezus (2013), was uploaded to SoundCloud, which featured vocals from Travis Scott instead of the Weeknd and included a new sample.

Along with these alternate versions, a demo track titled "Fall Out of Heaven" was also leaked. Featuring The-Dream and Bon Iver, the song's outro reuses the same sample as "FML". Several lyrics from it would later be reused for the album track "Famous". Collin Robinson of Stereogun noted that West's verses "aren’t quite finished, with Kanye mumbling a cadence in parts, but the structure of the song is there."

An unofficial remix of the song by American record producer Alvin Risk was released in February 2017.

== Composition and lyrics ==
A sample of "Hit" by Section 25 is heavily used to compose the outro, along with vocals from West. In response to West sampling their work, Section 25 members Bethany and Vincent Cassidy praised him highly.

After making changes in the album in June 2016, the song's vocals were made louder and the background vocals were added in the second round of the Weeknd's hook.

"FML" is titled to stand for two meanings: "For My Lady", since West raps in the first verse "I been waiting for a minute/For my lady" and "Fuck My Life (up)" since the Weeknd sings on the chorus "I wish I would go ahead and fuck my life up/Can't let them get to me/And even though I always fuck my life up/Only I can mention me." West mentions the antidepressant drug Lexapro in reference to his issues with mental health, a subject West mostly touched on in the song "I Feel Like That" from the end of his and Steve McQueen's music video for West's 2015 single "All Day".

== Critical reception ==
Pitchfork's Jayson Greene viewed the song as where West "alludes to something that sounds an awful lot like a manic episode". Jake Indiana of Highsnobiety wrote in response to it that "there's a lot to love here, particularly in Ye's lyrics", but he had a mixed reaction to the Weeknd's appearance, describing it as where he "gives a massive assist on this guest spot, but by song's end his refrain becomes a bit whiny". NME writer Larry Bartleet listed it 13th in his top 50 songs about depression list.

== Commercial performance ==
The track debuted at number 84 on the US Billboard Hot 100 within the same week that The Life of Pablo was released. "FML" charted on the UK Singles Chart at exactly the same position upon the album's release and then never charted again on it. On the Canadian Hot 100, the song debuted at number 97 in the same week. This made the song stand along with "Ultralight Beam" and "Waves" as one of only three non-single releases from West's album to chart in Canada. Alongside its debut on the US Billboard Hot 100, "FML" charted at number 30 on the US Hot R&B/Hip-Hop Songs chart and spend a total of three weeks on it.

== In family culture ==
West's sister-in-law Kylie Jenner named the track as her favourite song from The Life of Pablo in March 2016. His ex-wife Kim Kardashian listed the track in August 2016 among her top 28 favorite songs by her husband.

== Credits and personnel ==
Credits adapted from West's official website.

- Vocals – the Weeknd
- Keyboards – Mike Dean
- Production – Kanye West and Mitus (Note: Better known as Keyon Christ.)
- Co-production – Metro Boomin, Noah Goldstein, Dean
- Additional production – Charlie Heat, Hudson Mohawke and Andrew Dawson
- Engineering – Goldstein, Dawson, Anthony Kilhoffer and Dean
- Vocal recording – Shin Kamiyama
- Mix engineer – Manny Marroquin at Larrabee Studios, North Hollywood, California
- Mix assistants – Chris Galland, Ike Schultz and Jeff Jackson

== Charts ==
Chart (2016)	Peak position
Canada Hot 100 (Billboard)	97
Sweden Heatseeker (Sverigetopplistan)	3
UK Singles (Official Charts)	84
UK Hip Hop/R&B (Official Charts)	23
US Billboard Hot 100	84
US Hot R&B/Hip-Hop Songs (Billboard)	30

== Certifications ==
Region	Certification	Certified units/sales
Denmark (IFPI Danmark)	Gold	45,000^{‡}
New Zealand (RMNZ)	Gold	15,000^{‡}
United Kingdom (BPI)	Silver	200,000^{‡}
United States (RIAA)	Platinum	1,000,000^{‡}
^{‡} Sales+streaming figures based on certification alone.
