= Facts (Kanye West song) =

2015 promotional single by Kanye West

Promotional single by Kanye West
- Released: December 31, 2015
- Recorded: 2015
- Genre: Hip-hop; trap
- Length: 3:31
- Label: GOOD; Def Jam
- Songwriters: Kanye West; Cydel Young; Noah Goldstein; Joshua Luellen; Nicholas Smith; Aubrey Graham; Leland Wayne; Nayvadius Wilburn
- Producers: Metro Boomin; Southside

"Facts" (Charlie Heat version)

Song by Kanye West

from the album The Life of Pablo
- Released: February 14, 2016
- Recorded: 2015–2016
- Genre: Hip-hop
- Length: 3:20
- Label: GOOD; Def Jam
- Songwriters: Kanye West; Cydel Young; Ernest Brown III; Noah Goldstein; Joshua Luellen; Nicholas Smith; Aubrey Graham; Leland Wayne; Nayvadius Wilburn
- Producers: Kanye West; Metro Boomin; Southside; Charlie Heat

"Facts" (stylized in all caps) is a song by American rapper Kanye West. It was released as the lead promotional single for his seventh studio album The Life of Pablo (2016) on New Year's Eve 2015, through West's GOOD Music label and Def Jam Recordings. The song was written by West himself, alongside Cyhi the Prynce, Noah Goldstein, Nicholas Smith, and producers Southside and Metro Boomin; fellow rappers Drake and Future are credited as writers due to an interpolation of their song "Jumpman". An alternate version of the song appears on The Life of Pablo with writing and production credits from Charlie Heat, and as such is denoted as the "Charlie Heat version". Lyrically, the song is a diss track aimed at footwear company Nike.

Upon the release of "Facts", it received mixed-to-negative reviews from music critics, and its Charlie Heat-produced version specifically was described as "one of the album's worst songs." Commercially, the original track charted at number 50 on the R&B/Hip-Hop Airplay chart in the United States, while the Charlie Heat version charted at number 151 on the UK singles chart and peaked at number 4 on the Bubbling Under Hot R&B/Hip-Hop Singles chart in the US. It was additionally certified gold by the Recording Industry Association of America (RIAA) for equivalent sales of 500,000 units in the United States.

== Background ==
When the song was released, there was speculation of whether or not it would end up on the track listing of West's upcoming album. In the end, an alternative version did instead, titled "Facts" (Charlie Heat version). When Charlie Heat was asked about his name being on the album credits in an interview with Complex, he said it was "[a] dream manifested right in front of my face." On the kickoff show of West's Saint Pablo Tour in Indianapolis on August 25, 2016, West performed "Facts" (Charlie Heat version) live, but cut the performance of it short, avoiding the sympathetic mention of disgraced comedian Bill Cosby.

== Composition and lyrics ==
Throughout the track, West raps with the flow that Drake used in his 2015 single "Jumpman" with Future, the two artists are credited as co-writers. For both its intro and outro, the song includes a sped-up sample of 1989 track "Dirt and Grime" by Father's Children. It also contains sound effects from the video game Street Fighter II: The World Warrior (1991) throughout, including one of Street Fighter II's announcer yelling 'Perfect!' that is also sampled in "Pt. 2" from the same album as "Facts" (Charlie Heat version).

"Facts" sees West spin the line: "But the Yeezys jumped over the Jumpman" from his 2012 single "New God Flow" with Pusha T to: "Yeezy, Yeezy, Yeezy just jumped over Jumpman". Kanye brags about the success of his wife Kim Kardashian's Kimoji app with the lines: "Plus Kimoji just shut down the app store, uh!/And we made a million a minute, we made a million a minute".

The Charlie Heat version was featured on West's seventh studio album The Life of Pablo rather than the version of "Facts" initially released, with all the samples being kept in the version and the only difference being an alternative backing beat, produced by West, Metro Boomin, Southside and Heat. Though many of the tracks on The Life of Pablo were updated in June 2016, "Facts" (Charlie Heat version) was not subject to any changes.

== Release ==
Very shortly before the track was released, Kardashian made the world aware that her husband was about to come out with new music via Twitter and put '#FACTS' at the end of her tweet, but did not officially announce it as the title of West's release. Less than ten minutes prior to this, GOOD Music member Cyhi the Prynce had tweeted out the same hashtag, but with no direct reference to Kanye at all; Cyhi is a credited writer on "Facts". Since it was released as a promotional single, the song was only made available for free streaming on SoundCloud instead of sites like iTunes or Amazon Music.

The Charlie Heat version was first heard live along with the rest of an early version of West's 2016 album at Madison Square Garden on February 11, 2016, as part of his Yeezy Season 3 fashion show in collaboration with Adidas. West hushed an anti-Michael Jordan chant during this premiere. The next morning, the song was announced as part of the album. Heat saw an increase in fame due to his involvement.

== Critical reception ==
The song received mixed-to-negative reviews from music critics. Spencer Kornhaber with The Atlantic described the song as West "[reminding] people of why he matters in the first place". "Facts" (Charlie Heat version) was branded by James Rainis of Slant Magazine as being "just a lot of tough talk from someone who just made the questionably accurate declaration that he's $53 million in debt" and he also accused West of ripping off Future. Highsnobiety's Jake Indiana voiced the belief that the song possesses "more than a few sonic similarities" to 2 Chainz's Kanye West-featuring 2012 single "Birthday Song", but criticized "Facts" for "entirely lacking the fun, sense of humor, and witty lyrics that make [the earlier single] so delightfully bad (in a good way)". The track was placed by Complex on a list of the worst songs on the best albums of 2016, writing: "["Facts"] got a new beat from Charlie Heat, making it listenable for the first time, but "better" and "listenable" don't warrant any song's inclusion on one of the best albums of the year."

== Controversy ==
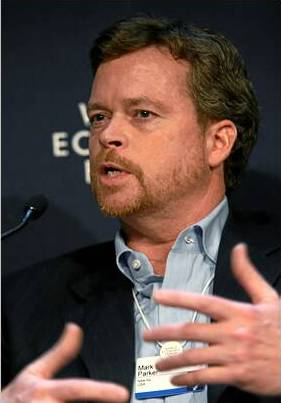
West had a feud with Nike CEO Mark Parker.

"Facts" is a diss track aimed at footwear company Nike, with lines such as: "If Nike ain’t had Drizzy man they would have nothing" and "Nike, Nike treat employees just like slaves / Gave LeBron a billi' not to run away" throughout the song. Upon release, there was speculation that Canadian rapper Drake was being dissed, but it was not aimed at him. Bill Cosby and Steve Harvey are both referenced with the lines: "Do anybody feel bad for Bill Cosby? / Did he forget names just like Steve Harvey?" West caused outrage shortly after the release of "Facts" by declaring Cosby as innocent of sexual assault, despite the lines appearing to be a insult towards him.

Marcus Jordan posted his reaction to the lyrics about Nike via Twitter on January 2, 2016, two days after the track's release. Lebron James had an interview regarding this diss, in which he acted in a way that was described as 'predictably diplomatic, backing Nike and avoiding any direct disagreement with the popular rapper, producer, and designer'. On January 8, two days after James was interviewed, West himself clarified that there was no feud between them. West took to Twitter on February 9, 2016, to offer an apology to Michael Jordan and insisted that his beef was with Nike CEO Mark Parker.

== Commercial performance ==
Upon the release of the original version, it solely charted at number 50 on the US Billboard R&B/Hip-Hop Airplay chart. Upon the release of the featuring album, "Facts" (Charlie Heat version) debuted at number 4 on the US Billboard Bubbling Under R&B/Hip-Hop Singles chart and spent a total of three weeks on the chart. It also charted at number 151 on the UK singles chart, and was certified gold by the Recording Industry Association of America (RIAA) for equivalent sales of 500,000 units in the country.

== In popular culture ==
"Facts" was fact-checked by Jordan Lipsitz of Bustle magazine. Matthew Strauss of Inverse was inspired to look at the history of bad songs by West.

== Credits and personnel ==
=== Charlie Heat version ===
Credits adapted from West's official website.

- Production – Kanye West, Metro Boomin, Southside & Charlie Heat for Very Good Beats, Inc.
- Engineering – Noah Goldstein, Andrew Dawson, Anthony Kilhoffer, Mike Dean
- Mix engineer – Manny Marroquin at Larrabee Studios, North Hollywood, CA
- Mix assistants – Chris Galland, Ike Schultz and Jeff Jackson

== Charts ==
=== Weekly charts ===
==== Original version ====
| Chart (2016) | Peak position |
|---|---|
| US R&B/Hip-Hop Airplay (Billboard) | 50 |

==== Charlie Heat version ====
| Chart (2016) | Peak position |
|---|---|
| UK Singles (Official Charts) | 151 |
| US Bubbling Under R&B/Hip-Hop Singles (Billboard) | 4 |

== Certifications ==
=== Charlie Heat version ===
| Region | Certification | Certified units/sales |
|---|---|---|
| United States (RIAA) | Gold | 500,000^{‡} |
^{‡} Sales+streaming figures based on certification alone.
