= Father's Children =

American funk band

- Origin: Adams Morgan, Washington, D.C., United States
- Genres: Funk, Soul, R&B
- Years active: 1970s, 2023-present
- Labels: Mercury Records, The Numero Group
- Members: Tom Crosson; Leroy Ragland; Charles Robinson; Qaadir Sumler; Greg Ross; Ted Carpenter

Father's Children is an American funk band, that was formed in the late 1960s and rose to fame in the mid-to late 1970s. The group was initially formed as a doo-wop trio in Adams Morgan, Washington, D.C. under the name The Dreams, but evolved into a funk and soul band. In 1973 they were set to release their debut album Who's Gonna Save the World, but their management company folded and the band was unable to find a record label. In 1979, they released their self-titled debut album under the record label Mercury Records. The album was produced by Wayne Henderson, formerly of The Crusaders, and co-produced by Augie Johnson of the group Side Effect. The group spent three months in Los Angeles recording at Ocean Way Studios, with Henderson adding a host of other musicians to the recording, such as keyboardists Bobby Lyle and Dean Gant. The production added a slicker horn driven sound, but took away from the band's trademark raw East Coast feel. The album did not take off as planned due to lack of effort and promotion by their label.

Who's Gonna Save the World was finally released by archive music label The Numero Group in 2011. The group received attention once again when their song "Dirt and Grime" was used by Kanye West as a sample for the track "Facts" from his 2016 studio album The Life of Pablo. In 2019, Smoke DZA and Curren$y sampled "I Really, Really Love You" on their song "Cinderella Story".

== Discography ==
- Father's Children, Mercury Records, 1979
- Sky's the Limit, FC Music, LLC, 2007
- Who's Gonna Save the World, The Numero Group, 2011
- Love and Life Stories, FC Music, LLC, 2013

== Samples ==
- 1999 "Wild Woman", DJ Honda feat. Black Attack
- 2004 "Hollywood Dreaming", Gift of Gab
- 2004 "Hollywood Dreaming", Ruudolf feat. Karri Koira
- 2010 "Gone Bad", Statik Selektah feat Termanology
- 2012 "Hollywood Dreaming", Vanilla
- 2013 "Hollywood Dreaming", International Nova feat. Hussein Fatal and Shorty Mack
- 2016 "Dirt and Grime", Kanye West
- 2016 "Dirt and Grime", Celestaphone
- 2016 "I Really, Really Love You", Middle Clash
- 2017 "I Really, Really Love You", J^P^N
- 2018 "I Really, Really Love You", Planet Asia
- 2018 "You Can Get It", Thalmanmonkz
- 2019 "Inshallah", Narcy featuring Shadia Mansour
- 2020 "I Really, Really Love You", Smoke DZA x Curren$y
- 2020 "Dirt and Grime", Jack Harlow
- 2020 "Weight", Redveil
- 2022 "Breath Control", Logic feat. Wiz Khalifa
