= I Love Kanye =

2016 song by Kanye West

Song by Kanye West

from the album The Life of Pablo
- Released: February 14, 2016
- Genre: Spoken word
- Length: 0:44
- Label: GOOD; Def Jam
- Songwriters: Kanye West; Malik Jones
- Producer: Kanye West

"I Love Kanye" (originally "I Miss the Old Kanye") is a song by American rapper Kanye West from his seventh studio album, The Life of Pablo (2016). The song was solely produced by West, who wrote it alongside Malik Yusef. A spoken word track, it has no instrumental. Lyrically, West shows self-awareness by making fun of his changing public image while referencing the internet meme that he loves himself. The song received generally positive reviews from music critics, who were often complimentary towards West's lyrics. They mostly praised his self-awareness, while a few critics highlighted West's arrogance.

In 2018, Billboard named "I Love Kanye" as the 11th greatest interlude of all time. The song peaked at numbers 14 and 48 on the US Billboard Bubbling Under Hot 100 and US Hot R&B/Hip-Hop Songs charts, respectively. It was certified gold in the United States by the Recording Industry Association of America (RIAA). In February 2016, West used the song against Kyle Mooney during their rap battle on Saturday Night Live (SNL). Meek Mill used an Instagram post to reference the song in May 2018. Numerous remixes of the song were released from February to March 2016, including respective ones by Key Wane and DJ Premier.

== Background and recording ==
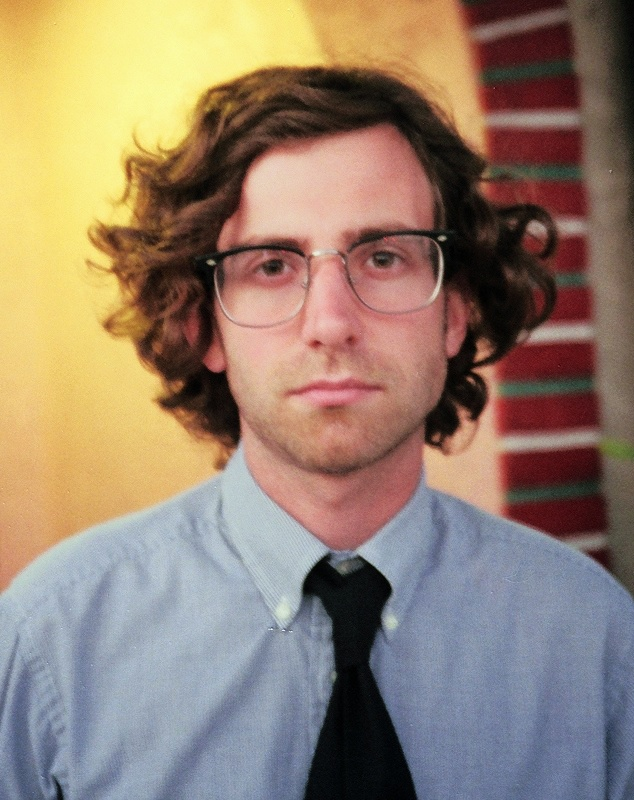
West premiered the song during a rap battle with Kyle Mooney in February 2016.

Prior to "I Love Kanye", there had been internet memes about how much West loves himself, which he capitalized on with the song. Many critics and fans have claimed that West's music and political views were better earlier in his career, with him using the song to show awareness of such criticism. The song was produced by West, standing alongside "Siiiiiiilver Surfffeeeeer Intermission" as one of the two tracks on The Life of Pablo that he solely produced. West co-wrote the song with Malik Yusef.

"I Love Kanye" was originally titled "I Miss the Old Kanye". A day before the album's release, West debuted the track on Saturday Night Live (SNL) by using it in a freestyle rap battle against American comedian Kyle Mooney. On February 14, 2016, "I Love Kanye" was included on The Life of Pablo. The following month, West took to Twitter and sent out lyrics from the track in separate tweets for each line. When West was at Disneyland in June 2016, a young child asked him how he wrote the track. West replied by grinning and saying, "I just thought about what I loved."

== Composition and lyrics ==
Musically, "I Love Kanye" is a spoken word track. The song has no instrumental, with West rapping a cappella throughout. According to a number of music journalists, he raps in a humorous manner. West ends the song with a laugh.

In the lyrics of the song, West demonstrates self-awareness while mocking his changing public image. West acknowledges the viral memes that reference how much he loves himself, rapping "I love you like Kanye loves Kanye" at one point. He also addresses criticism that his music was better in the past, particularly when he released his first two studio albums The College Dropout (2004) and Late Registration (2005). West refers to different versions of himself, such as the "old Kanye", "new Kanye", and "sweet Kanye". In total, West mentions his forename 25 times in the lyrics.

== Release and reception ==
On February 14, 2016, "I Love Kanye" was released as the ninth track on West's seventh studio album The Life of Pablo, which was a Tidal exclusive album at the time. The song was later made available on the streaming services Spotify and Apple Music on March 30, 2016, and West tweeted out a link to the website ilovekanyesong.com that featured direct links to the song on the streaming services alongside their logos. (Note: The album was ultimately released to all streaming services and made available for purchase through West's official website on April 1, 2016.) "I Love Kanye" was met with generally positive reviews from music critics, with them mostly praising West's lyrics. Ryan Patrick of USA Today highlighted the self-awareness demonstrated by West on the song for showing him "heralding his own singularity as an artist". The New York Times' Jon Caramanica also noticed West's self-awareness, referring to the song as "a rhyme and hubris exercise" that is "also a rant that's also a barometer of public opinion that's also a wink". Rob Sheffield from Rolling Stone admitted West sounding as if he "is actually mourning the long-running love affair between Kanye and Kanye" is why the song "stings, especially the punch line 'I love you like Kanye loves Kanye'" because West has awareness that he consistently "fucks over the one he loves", even himself, who Sheffield asserted West "loves most". Expressing a similar sentiment, Alexis Petridis of The Guardian pointed to the line as an example of "self-awareness occasionally suggested by TLOP's lyrics". Pitchfork critic Jayson Greene noted mirrors are seen by West "everywhere he looks" after he has "changed the genre's DNA with every album", reaching the point at which every album has provided inspiration for "a generation of direct offspring" and the song's message is clearly that West is done with "creating new Kanyes, at least for now". Greene continued by opining that West is fine "to just stand among them, both those of his own creation and their various devotees" while branding his rapping on the song as "wryly".

Reviewing in his Vice Expert Witness column, Robert Christgau described the song as a "pseudo-freestyle meta-wink" and called it a narcissist's version of The College Dropout track "We Don't Care" that is "almost as funny". Christgau elaborated, writing: "The sour-grapes self-examination morphs into a pseudo-outlet track." In a somewhat mixed review for The Daily Telegraph, Neil McCormick wrote "I love you like Kanye loves Kanye" is West's apparent "idea of an ultimate compliment" and noticed the line is likely his attempt "to make a joke about perceptions of his egomania" while deriding how "underlying it is an actual egomania that blinds West to just how narrow his self-obsession really is". In NME, Gavin Haynes dismissed the song's "postmodern LOLs" as one of the "unwelcome guests" on the album.

In 2018, Billboard ranked "I Love Kanye" as the 11th greatest interlude of all time, and the magazine's Xander Zellner admitted that West "proved to the world that he sees your tweets, he reads the headlines, and he's in on the joke" with the song. Zellner elaborated, observing that the track is "barely a song" and registers "just as much a self-aware personal statement -- closing with the ever-definitive 'I love you like Kanye loves Kanye.'"

== Commercial performance ==
Following the release of The Life of Pablo, the song debuted at number 14 on the US Billboard Bubbling Under Hot 100 chart. That same week, it entered the US Hot R&B/Hip-Hop Songs chart at number 48, and received 3.9 million streams. On February 24, 2020, "I Love Kanye" was certified gold by the Recording Industry Association of America (RIAA) for pushing 500,000 certified units in the United States. Elsewhere, the song reached number 123 on the UK Singles Chart. It peaked at number 35 on the UK R&B Chart.

== Live performances and appearances in media ==
During a sketch for SNL entitled "Kyle vs. Kanye" on February 13, 2016, West engaged in a freestyle rap battle with Mooney. The rap battle started with Mooney freestyling against West, which he replied to by using "I Love Kanye" as a freestyle. The song was performed live by West as part of the Saint Pablo Tour's kickoff show at Bankers Life Fieldhouse in Indianapolis on August 25, 2016. On November 1, 2016, West performed the song for the tour's fourth concert at The Forum in Inglewood.

Following the release of The Life of Pablo, the song became a popular topic with West's fans across Twitter. The song's line "I miss the old Kanye" was the inspiration for a Stillwater Artisanal beer of the same name, which was in tribute to the line. The label of the beer was inspired by the album's artwork. After West seemingly ranted against him in October 2016, fellow rapper Jay-Z referenced "I Love Kanye" as he admitted to "miss the old Kanye". In May 2018, rapper Meek Mill paid reference to the song by posting an image to his Instagram showing a mock memorial of West that was designed by American art collective SuperPoorKids, with the image being surrounded by the words "RIP Old Kanye".

== Remixes ==
On February 15, 2016, a remix of "I Love Kanye" was shared by American producer Stefan Ponce, re-imagining the song with a sample of the Dramatics' "I Dedicate My Life To You" (1973). A remix by producer Key Wane was released six days later, titled "Kanye". For the remix, a soulful backdrop is added and some of the lyrics are flipped. On February 25, 2016, a remix was released by DJ Premier, who had collaborated with West on the remix of the single "Classic (Better Than I've Ever Been)" in 2007. Of his latest remix, DJ Premier said: "I'm a street DJ and when a good acappella is naked, you put some clothes on it." The remix adds elements of piano, slow-knocking kick and snare, a bassline, and percussion. It also features scratches from DJ Premier and vocal samples of Late Registration track "Wake Up Mr. West". The same day as the release of the DJ's remix, rapper Hezekiah shared his "Pro Remix" of the song. The remix heavily features chops and combines the original with a sample of Jocelyn Brown's "Somebody Else's Guy" (1984).

A remix of the song under the title of "Old Kanye" by American production team J.U.S.T.I.C.E. League and producer 8 Bars was released on February 28, 2016. Discussing the remix, the team explained that they "wanted to take Kanye's verse and make it into a full-blown song". "Old Kanye" has a jazz instrumental and heavily features synths, while also adding cascading chords and soundbites of newscasts. The remix includes a hook that is performed by Stige, during which Auto-Tune is used on his vocals. Stige raps a second verse, which lyrically echoes the sentiment expressed by West on the original. American producer TM88 shared a remix entitled "TrapYeezy88" on March 3, 2016. Prior to the remix, TM88 had worked with West on the rapper's 2011 collaborative studio album Watch the Throne with Jay-Z. A trap remix, "TrapYeezy88" runs for two minutes and adds hi-hats as well as synths, while West's vocals are chopped up and distorted.

== Credits and personnel ==
Credits adapted from West's official website.

Recording

- Mixed at Larrabee Studios, North Hollywood, CA

Personnel

- Kanye West – songwriter, production
- Malik Yusef – songwriter
- Noah Goldstein – engineer
- Manny Marroquin – mixer
- Chris Galland – assistant mixer
- Ike Schultz – assistant mixer
- Jeff Jackson – assistant mixer

== Charts ==
Chart performance for "I Love Kanye"
Chart (2016)	Peak position
UK Singles (Official Charts)	123
UK Hip Hop/R&B (Official Charts)	35
US Bubbling Under Hot 100 (Billboard)	14
US Hot R&B/Hip-Hop Songs (Billboard)	48
US On-Demand Streaming Songs (Billboard)	44

== Certifications ==
Certifications for "I Love Kanye"
Region	Certification	Certified units/sales
United States (RIAA)	Gold	500,000^{‡}
^{‡} Sales+streaming figures based on certification alone.
