= The Life of Pablo =

Studio album by Kanye West
- Released: February 14, 2016
- Recorded: 2010 (Note: West and Madlib began working on the Life of Pablo song "No More Parties in LA" during the My Beautiful Dark Twisted Fantasy sessions.); November 2013 – February 2016; March 2016 – June 2016 (post-release)
- Studios: Abel's Crib (Toronto); Ameraycan (California); Sound EQ (California); Dean's List House of Hits (SoHo); Germano (New York City); Home studios; Home studios (Calabasas); Jungle City (California and New York); Larrabee (North Hollywood); No Name (Punta Mita and Florence); Noble Street; Windmark (Santa Monica)
- Genres: Hip-hop; gospel; art pop
- Length: 66:01
- Labels: GOOD; Def Jam
- Producers: Boi-1da; Cashmere Cat; Chance the Rapper; Charlie Heat; DJDS; Havoc; Kanye West; Karriem Riggins; Madlib; Menace; Metro Boomin; Mike Dean; Mitus; Rick Rubin; Sinjin Hawke; Southside; Swizz Beatz

Kanye West chronology
Yeezus (2013)	The Life of Pablo (2016)	Ye (2018)

Alternate cover art
- Clean version and original release cover

Singles from The Life of Pablo
- 1. "Famous" Released: March 28, 2016; 2. "Father Stretch My Hands" Released: June 7, 2016; 3. "Fade" Released: September 9, 2016

The Life of Pablo is the seventh studio album by the American rapper Kanye West. It was released on February 14, 2016, through GOOD Music and Def Jam Recordings. West recorded it between 2013 and 2016, and led its production with the executive producers Rick Rubin and Noah Goldstein. Guest appearances include The-Dream, Kelly Price, Chance the Rapper, Kirk Franklin, Kid Cudi, Desiigner, Rihanna, Young Thug, Chris Brown, the Weeknd, Ty Dolla Sign, Vic Mensa, Sia, Frank Ocean, Kendrick Lamar, Post Malone, and Sampha.

West summarized The Life of Pablo as his interpretation of the Gospel, and music journalists have described its sound as blending hip-hop with gospel music. Critics described its soundscape as intentionally messy and fragmented, combining the sampling, Auto-Tune, avant-pop, and industrial rap of West's previous works in an experimental fashion. It often shifts between subjects abruptly, as West exhibits braggadocio and paranoia. Themes include his Christian faith, family issues, and celebrity status. West changed the title frequently throughout the recording process, and the final one refers to three individuals: the drug dealer Pablo Escobar, the artist Pablo Picasso, and Paul the Apostle.

West played an early version of The Life of Pablo at Madison Square Garden on February 11, 2016, before the initial release on Tidal. West continued to work on it post-release; an updated version was released on other streaming services and for download on April 1. It was supported by six singles, including the Billboard Hot 100 hits "Famous", "Father Stretch My Hands", and "Fade", and West's Saint Pablo Tour throughout 2016. The Life of Pablo received positive reviews, with particular attention paid to the fragmented, unfinished nature of the composition and release. Multiple publications named it one of 2016's best albums, with Paste ranking among the "300 Greatest Albums of All Time".

The Life of Pablo received five nominations at the 2017 Grammy Awards, including Best Rap Album, though numerous publications deemed its lack of an Album of the Year nomination a snub. Following Tidal's initial disclosure of its streaming data and its release to competing streaming services, The Life of Pablo debuted at number one on the US Billboard 200, becoming the first album to do so primarily through streaming. It also debuted at number one in Norway, and in the top ten in Canada, Denmark, Finland, Ireland, the Netherlands, and Sweden. It was certified triple platinum by the Recording Industry Association of America in 2022.

== Background and development ==
In November 2013, Kanye West began working on his seventh studio album, with the working title of So Help Me God intended for a 2014 release date. Q-Tip announced he and Rick Rubin, one of the executive producers of West's sixth studio album Yeezus (2013), would produce the album. Early recording sessions resulted in several tracks released as standalone singles or given to other artists, including West's Paul McCartney collaborations "All Day", "Only One", and the McCartney and Rihanna collaboration "FourFiveSeconds". In 2015, West announced the album's new title as Swish, though he noted the title could change. West announced in January 2016 that Swish would be released on February 11. He released a new song "Real Friends" that month simultaneously with a snippet of "No More Parties in LA". This signified a revival of the GOOD Fridays initiative where West had released new singles every Friday. On January 26, 2016, West revealed he had renamed the album Waves.

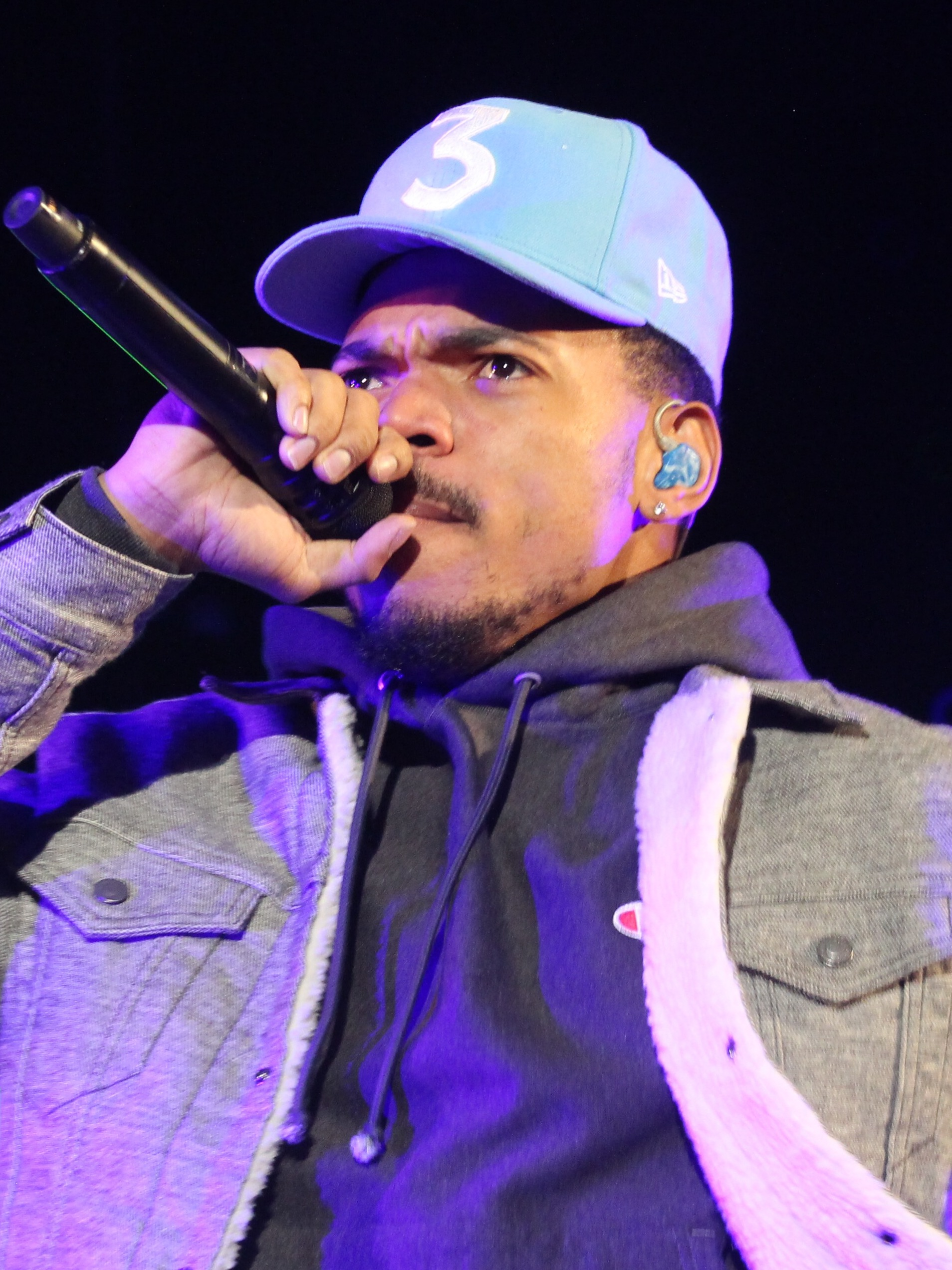
Chance the Rapper contributed to several tracks, including "Ultralight Beam" and "Waves".

The track "Famous", featuring vocals by frequent West collaborator Rihanna and American hip-hop recording artist Swizz Beatz, was scrutinized on social media for its controversial lyrical reference to American singer Taylor Swift, because West had interrupted her acceptance speech at the 2009 MTV Video Music Awards.

On February 9, 2016, several days ahead of its release, West changed the title to The Life of Pablo. On February 11, West premiered an early version of the album at Madison Square Garden during the presentation of his Yeezy Season 3 clothing line. Following the preview, West announced he would modify the track list again before its public release. He delayed the release further to finalize the recording of the track "Waves" at the behest of co-writer Chance the Rapper.

== Recording ==
=== Initial sessions ===
The Life of Pablo was recorded between 2013 and 2016, though recording for the track "No More Parties in LA" started in 2010, during the sessions for My Beautiful Dark Twisted Fantasy. Ty Dolla Sign reported that writing and recording for the album took place in Mexico in September 2014; he recalled McCartney and Rihanna were present. American rappers Pusha T and Consequence confirmed that they had ended their feud to work with West on music to be released by him.

In April 2014, during an interview with Self-Titled, English electronic music producer Evian Christ explained that despite West not always being musically clear, he just seemed "interested in pushing aesthetic boundaries as far into the Avant as possible". He will say "This is not experimental enough. This is too poppy. Make something else." This can confuse other musicians. Christ said that West is "a dream to work with", adding that when it comes to creative freedom, West is on his own level in terms of the freedom. He explained "he wants you to work to a blueprint, the blueprint is: 'Don't make a rap beat. Anything but a rap beat'". In February 2015, while West was continuing work on The Life of Pablo, he confirmed the album was around 80% complete.

In March 2015, during an interview with MTV, promoting his third studio album Dark Sky Paradise (2015), Big Sean spoke about the multiple recording locations involved in The Life of Pablo including Mexico and Hawaii. In an October 2015 interview with The Fader, Post Malone, who is featured on the track "Fade" with Ty Dolla Sign, discussed his experiences with West describing him as "just a normal guy, like me, and super cool".

On January 27, 2016, West revealed the update of the final track listing for The Life of Pablo on his official Twitter account. The updated track listing included a number of unannounced potential collaborators: Earl Sweatshirt, The-Dream, Tyler, the Creator, The World Famous Tony Williams, Diddy, Danny!, ASAP Rocky, Kid Cudi, Lil Uzi Vert, Drake, Teyana Taylor, Zoë Kravitz, Bibi Bourelly, Doug E. Fresh, How to Dress Well, and French Montana, as well as a return of his frequent production collaborators, such as Mike Dean, Hudson Mohawke, Plain Pat, Vicious, Anthony Kilhoffer, A-Trak, and Noah Goldstein. Following the album's premiere at Madison Square Garden, it was revealed that Brooklyn-based rapper Desiigner contributed vocals to "Pt. 2" and "Freestyle 4".

=== Post-release updates ===
West released The Life of Pablo for streaming on February 14, 2016, following a performance on Saturday Night Live. Although a statement by West around the time of The Life of Pablo's release indicated it would be a permanent exclusive to Tidal, the album was released through several other competing services beginning in April 2016. Before the release of The Life of Pablo, West had tweeted that it was a hip-hop and a gospel album. In an interview on Big Boy Radio, West said: "When I was sitting in the studio with Kirk, Kirk Franklin, and we're just going through it, I said this is a gospel album, with a whole lot of cursing on it, but it's still a gospel album." Following The Life of Pablo's initial Tidal release, West said he intended to continue altering the songs, declaring the album a "living breathing changing creative expression."

On March 13, 2016, over a month after the release, West uploaded an updated version of "Famous", swapping out the lyric "She be Puerto Rican day parade wavin'" for "She in school to be a real estate agent", as well as making slight tweaks to the overall mix. Three days later, West updated the album's Tidal track list with a reworked version of "Wolves", which included previously removed guest vocals by Vic Mensa and Sia, and separated the ending portion sung by Frank Ocean into a separate interlude under the title of "Frank's Track". This reworking was done around a month after West proposed a fix to the song. On March 30, The Life of Pablo received a major update, with at least 12 tracks appearing in altered forms. The updates included prominent vocal additions, new lyrics, and altered mixes. Def Jam confirmed this incarnation to be "a newly updated, remixed and remastered version", and clarified that the album would continue to appear with "new updates, new versions and new iterations" in the following months, calling it "a continuous process". A minor update was published on April 2, fixing the outro vocals for "30 Hours" which had been rendered off-time during the March 31 update. Finally, on June 14, The Life of Pablo was updated to include an additional track titled "Saint Pablo" featuring vocals by British musician Sampha, with other miscellaneous alterations throughout the album.

Discussing The Life of Pablo's continued alterations, Jayson Greene of Pitchfork mused "at what point is a record 'over', and who gets to make the call"? He claimed West was "seeing how far he can stretch the point right now, in a way no pop star has ever quite tried", describing him as "testing the shifting state of the 'album cycle' to see if he can break it entirely, making his album like another piece of software on your phone that sends you push updates". Winston Cook-Wilson of Inverse described the album as "a fluid construct", writing that "as a way of holding the public's attention span, Kanye's choice to continue to tweak The Life is Pablo indefinitely is genius". He elaborated, "It encourages people spend time processing an album that deserves it: a bewildering, sprawling, and controversy-courting piece of art." The unconventional updates post-release inspired other artists to do the same, with Future and Young Thug making similar alterations after the release of their albums. However, in The Guardian, Nosheen Iqbal noted the criticism that West faced for updating the album. Brian Welk and Ross A. Lincoln from TheWrap claimed West should have ended the updates after his initial changes to The Life of Pablo three days after its release. In a January 2020 interview with GQ, West explained his continuous updates to the album, saying, "Nothing is ever done."

== Musical style ==
The Life of Pablo was noted by Entertainment Weekly's Madison Vain for its "raw, occasionally even intentionally messy, composition" in contrast to West's previous albums. Compared to his pre-Yeezus work, Robert Yaniz Jr of Cheat Sheet viewed the album as West taking on a sound that is not as accessible and "more self-indulgent". Rolling Stone's Rob Sheffield wrote that The Life of Pablo sounds messy, though he expressed the feeling the sound is purposeful to follow on from "the laser-sharp intensity of Yeezus", saying the album is "designed to sound like a work in progress". Carl Wilson of Slate suggested that with the given context of the sonic landscaping throughout The Life of Pablo, the point is that "in West's kamikaze, mood-swinging way, Pablo now seems undeniably (not half-assedly, as I'd been about to conclude) like an album of struggle", noting the strange connections that it created "between Kanye's many iterations—soul-sample enthusiast, heartbroken Auto-Tune crooner, hedonistic avant-pop composer, industrial-rap shit-talker" while making use of bass and percussion lines "that are only the tail-end decay of some lost starting place, some vanished rhythmic Eden". Writing for The Daily Telegraph, Neil McCormick claimed the album sounds like abstract hip-hop work and noted the somewhat disjointed sound, while Pretty Much Amazing critic Nathan Wisnicki noted occasional elements of "hyperactive" progressive hip-hop.

"Ultralight Beam"
Sample of the intro track "Ultralight Beam", noted for its gospel elements.

West described the music on The Life of Pablo as "The gospel according to Ye", explaining that his gospel differs somewhat from what happened in the Bible, "but it's this story idea of Mary Magdalene becoming Mary". Corbin Reiff of The A.V. Club claimed the album only works "as a gospel record if, as a listener, you worship at his altar". Madison Vain described The Life of Pablo as "a gospel album". In Uproxx, Steven Hyden dubbed the album as West's "ecstatically bleary gospel-rap excursion". Gavin Haynes of NME described The Life of Pablo as the point where West suddenly changes direction "from futuristic beats on the likes of 'Feedback' to bog-standard modern trap", with Haynes citing Desiigner's vocals on "Pt. 2" as an example of the latter, while he noted West took on the direction of "vintage soul on 'Ultralight Beam'". Chance the Rapper and his instrumental collaborator Donnie Trumpet bring elements of soul revivalism into the track during Chance the Rapper's guest verse. Greg Kot of the Chicago Tribune contrasted Chance the Rapper's "gospel-informed hip-hop tracks" with West's take on that tradition, claiming the version of gospel provided by West includes "some of those sonic cues – heavy organ, soaring choirs". However, Kot concluded by describing West as "more preoccupied with gospel text and the notion of redemption". "Ultralight Beam", in particular, has been described as featuring several gospel elements, including "the sound of a 4-year-old preaching gospel, some organ", as well as a church choir singing the refrain of "This is a God dream". Gospel elements similar to those of the song are included in "Low Lights", adding to the general gospel theme. "Father Stretch My Hands, Pt. 1" was described as gospel music in its composition.

== Lyrics and themes ==
Ray Rahman of Entertainment Weekly noted the album's frequent meditations on matters of faith, family, and West's own role as a cultural figure while observing that "Pablo frequently (some might say abruptly) toggles between Sad Kanye and the bombastic and celebratory Kanye". McCormick described West as "constantly veering between swaggering bravado and insecurity bordering on paranoia, smashing the sacred against the profane and disrupting his own flowing grooves with interjections". He claimed the interjections sound as if "they are spilling over from another studio altogether". Referencing West's lyrical performance, Sheffield wrote that he "knows he's got some issues to work on". The Life of Pablo features "gloomy, doomy" discussions of trust issues, antidepressants, and familial problems on tracks such as "FML" and "Real Friends".

Chance the Rapper explained certain lyrics on his "Ultralight Beam" verse are a reference to his "own leadership of all other artists towards independence and freedom". The song itself is focused around West's faith in God. Miles Raymer of GQ wrote that "Father Stretch My Hands, Pt. 1" is "a gospel song about fucking models" and described it as transitioning into "a soul-baring confessional dance track" in "Pt. 2", which includes "two entire verses of an entirely different song about drug-dealing and cars" from Desiigner, with his single "Panda" being sampled. Raymer noted that after Desiigner's vocals, the song resolves "into a meditative piece for vocoder" from contemporary classical composer Caroline Shaw.

The song "Famous" includes the controversial lyric "I feel like me and Taylor might still have sex/Why? I made that bitch famous". The lyric refers to West interrupting Taylor Swift's acceptance speech at the 2009 MTV Video Music Awards. This was heavily publicized and many publications and viewers criticized West. Kot called the song "an example of just how brilliant and infuriating West can be at the same time". Greene wrote that the lyric "feels like a piece of bathroom graffiti" and felt its intention is to "reignite the most racially-charged rivalry in 21st-century pop". Throughout the song, West references the fame and wealth that he's gathered during his career, and he also showcases braggadocio.

"Real Friends"
On the promotional single "Real Friends" from the album's later half, West discusses trust issues regarding his family. Ty Dolla Sign provides additional vocals.

"Feedback" features West responding to his critics with the lyric, "Name one genius that ain't crazy" to do so. Raymer wrote the lyric is confirming the two frequent major criticisms of West "that he's an egomaniac and that he's mentally unwell". God and his connection to spirituality are referenced within "Low Lights", with the vocals coming from an unknown woman delivering a sample of Sandy Rivera's performance on the a cappella version of "Save Me" by the duo Kings of Tomorrow. West raps about the newfound fame and fortune in his life after marrying Kim Kardashian in "Highlights". West uses sexually explicit lyrics to describe his fantasies and dreams on "Freestyle 4". The interlude "I Love Kanye" features self-aware a cappella lyrics referencing West's changing public image. The track "Waves" is "uplifting", including braggadocious lyrics mixed with those of a darker tone that reference death or the ending of relationships. Within "FML", West raps about maintaining his loyalty to Kardashian, and the title stands for "Fuck My Life" as well as "For My Lady", as both phrases are mentioned in the song. Raymer claimed that the lyric "You ain't never seen nothing crazier than this nigga when he off his Lexapro" is confirmation of West's major sources of criticism. West touches on trust issues with his family on "Real Friends", which includes lyrics about a cousin blackmailing him.

West shows fear of possibly being viewed as a guilt-ridden son on "Wolves". The song features the lyrics "Cover Nori in lamb's wool/We surrounded by/The fuckin wolves", used by West to offer an image of him and Kardashian as the biblical figures Mary and Joseph. The interlude "Frank's Track" consists of Frank Ocean crooning depressing and dark lyrics. American rapper Max B delivers a voicemail about "good vibes" on "Siiiiiiiiilver Surffffeeeeer Intermission", which is followed by fellow rapper French Montana blurting out the phrase "silver surfer" repeatedly on the interlude, until the phrase is repeated by Max B. The song "30 Hours" includes West delivering the "real life commentary" that he has become known for. West unapologetically declares his greatness in "No More Parties in LA", while fellow rapper Kendrick Lamar adds to the backdrop of the song. "Facts" (Charlie Heat version) is a Nike diss track that features West bragging about the success of his Yeezy shoes. Forrest Wickman from Slate wrote that "Fade" is where "West, R&B singer-songwriter Ty Dolla Sign, and 'White Iverson' singer Post Malone alternate verses", with Wickman viewing the lyrics as being centered on "trying to hold on to a love that's fading". West raps in a self-reflective way on "Saint Pablo", which also includes him rapping with political edge, humor, and a logically clear through-line.

== Promotion and release ==
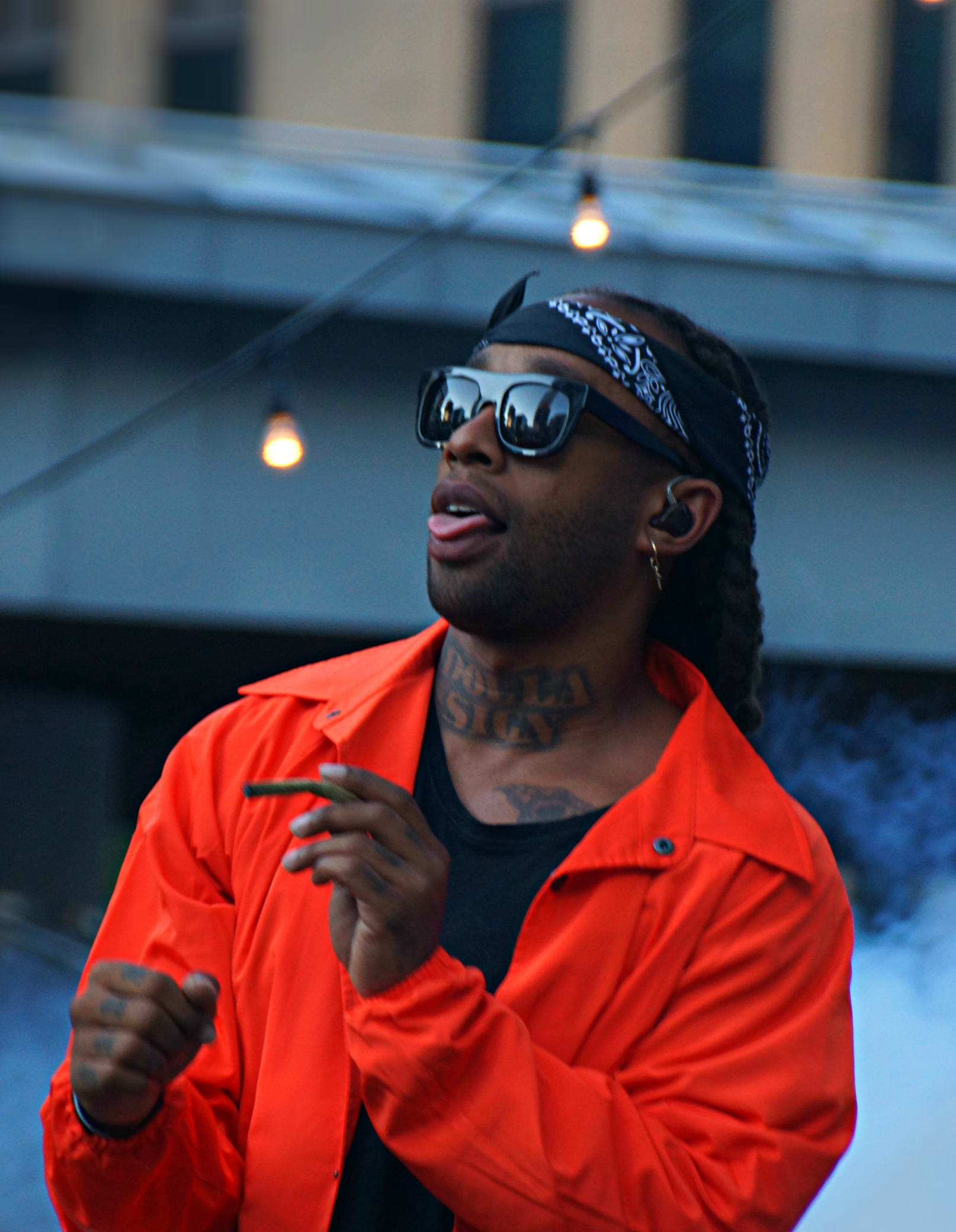
Vocals from Ty Dolla Sign are featured on the third single "Fade" and promotional single "Real Friends".

West marked his first music release since "All Day" with the release of the promotional single "Facts" on December 31, 2015. A new version of the song was released on The Life of Pablo under the title "Facts" (Charlie Heat version). On January 8, 2016, Kardashian announced via Twitter the release of "Real Friends", which simultaneously initiated the return of West's GOOD Fridays; West had launched this initiative as a weekly free music giveaway leading up to the release of My Beautiful Dark Twisted Fantasy. "Real Friends", featuring vocals by Ty Dolla Sign, was released the day it was announced via West's SoundCloud account with the disclosure of The Life of Pablo's release date. As well as debuting the song, West shared a snippet of the forthcoming GOOD Friday release, titled "No More Parties in LA", which features vocals by Kendrick Lamar. On August 16, 2019, "Real Friends" was certified silver in the United Kingdom by the British Phonographic Industry (BPI) for selling 200,000 units. "No More Parties in LA" experienced its proper release the following week, also through SoundCloud. Madlib and West produced the song, which contains a sample of "Suzie Thundertussy" performed by Walter "Junie" Morrison. It was certified gold in the US by the Recording Industry Association of America (RIAA) for sales of 500,000 units on August 15, 2018. After a number of delayed premieres, On February 12, 2016, West released a new track, titled "30 Hours", as part of his GOOD Fridays series. The song features vocals by American musician André 3000.

On February 14, West performed "Highlights" and "Ultralight Beam" on Saturday Night Live. That same day, The Life of Pablo was released for streaming exclusively on Tidal through GOOD Music, distributed by Def Jam Recordings. It was made available for purchase for $20 for a few hours, though it reverted to streaming-only afterwards. West announced the album would be available outside of Tidal a week later, while imploring people to sign up for the service. However, the following day, West claimed he would never release The Life of Pablo outside of Tidal, encouraging his fans to sign up for the service. On the same day, Pigeons & Planes claimed the version of the album made available for streaming on Tidal was not its final version. After an active weekend, during which he was finishing The Life of Pablo, West stated he had $53,000,000 in personal debt and called for Facebook founder Mark Zuckerberg to invest $1 billion in his ideas. West also called on other tech billionaires to help him. The album's premier and launch won the awards for Innovation and Integrated Campaign, respectively, at the 2017 Clio Awards.

=== Streaming and commercial release ===
The Life of Pablo initially received an exclusive Tidal release on February 14, 2016. West urged the public to download the application to hear the album, which resulted in it temporarily reaching the number one spot on the US App Store. West later tweeted that he "was thinking about not making CDs ever again", and stated that he would never release The Life of Pablo outside of Tidal. The album's initial exclusive release on Tidal resulted in a large increase in subscribers to the service, 250 million streams in the first 10 days, and 400 million streams in the first six weeks before its release to other streaming platforms. Following the Tidal exclusive release, it was announced that "Famous" would be sent to radio stations in the United States on March 28 as the lead single from The Life of Pablo; the song was exclusively released for streaming on Spotify and Apple Music on that date. It peaked at number 34 on the US Billboard Hot 100 and lasted for 14 weeks on the chart. The song was certified double platinum in the US by the RIAA for selling two million units on March 7, 2018. The song reached number 33 on the UK Singles Chart and remained on it for 16 weeks. On January 19, 2018, "Famous" was certified gold in the UK by the BPI for sales of 400,000 units. "I Love Kanye" was the next song from the album to be released on streaming services other than Tidal on March 30, 2016; it also became available on Spotify and Apple Music.

On April 1, 2016, West released an updated version of The Life of Pablo for streaming on Spotify, Apple Music, and Google Play. He also made the album available for purchase on his official website. Though "Father Stretch My Hands, Pt. 1" and "Pt. 2" were released as separate tracks on the album, both parts of the song were serviced to radio stations across the United States as the second single, "Father Stretch My Hands", on June 7. On the Billboard Hot 100, "Father Stretch My Hands, Pt. 1" charted at number 37 and spent 23 weeks on the chart. The song was certified double platinum in the US by the RIAA for sales of two million units on March 7, 2018. It peaked at number 54 on the UK Singles Chart and stayed on the chart for three weeks. The song was certified silver in the UK by the BPI for pushing 200,000 units on October 20, 2017. "Pt. 2" reached number 54 on the Billboard Hot 100 and remained on the chart for three weeks. On February 1, 2018, the song was certified platinum in the US by the RIAA for selling one million units. The song reached number 70 on the UK Singles Chart and remained there for three weeks, tying the chart stay of "Father Stretch My Hands, Pt. 1". "Fade" was released as the third and final single to radio stations in the UK on September 9, 2016, and sent to US radio stations on September 20. On the Billboard Hot 100, the song peaked at number 47 and spent 13 weeks on the chart. It reached number 50 on the UK Singles Chart and remained there for eight weeks. On May 12, 2017, "Fade" was certified silver in the UK by the BPI for selling 200,000 units.

=== Lawsuit ===
The release onto other streaming platforms, along with West's claims that the album would remain a permanent Tidal "exclusive" prompted a lawsuit to be filed on April 18, 2016, by law firm Edelson PC. It was filed against West and Jay-Z, who was involved as the owner of Tidal, with each of them being sued for $5 million. The lawsuit was filed on behalf of California resident Justin Baker-Rhett accusing them of false advertising. Seeking class-action status, the lawsuit claimed that Tidal and West never intended to have the album as a Tidal limited exclusive forever, but said so to boost Tidal's struggling subscriber growth; with the lawsuit claiming that Tidal's subscriber numbers tripled following the initial release of the album. The lawsuit also claimed that "Kanye has the power to send one tweet out into the world and get 2 million people to act on it" and suing West "is about holding him accountable when he abuses that power". In January 2019, it was reported the lawsuit had been settled with undisclosed terms; the class action lawsuit did not proceed.

=== Tour ===
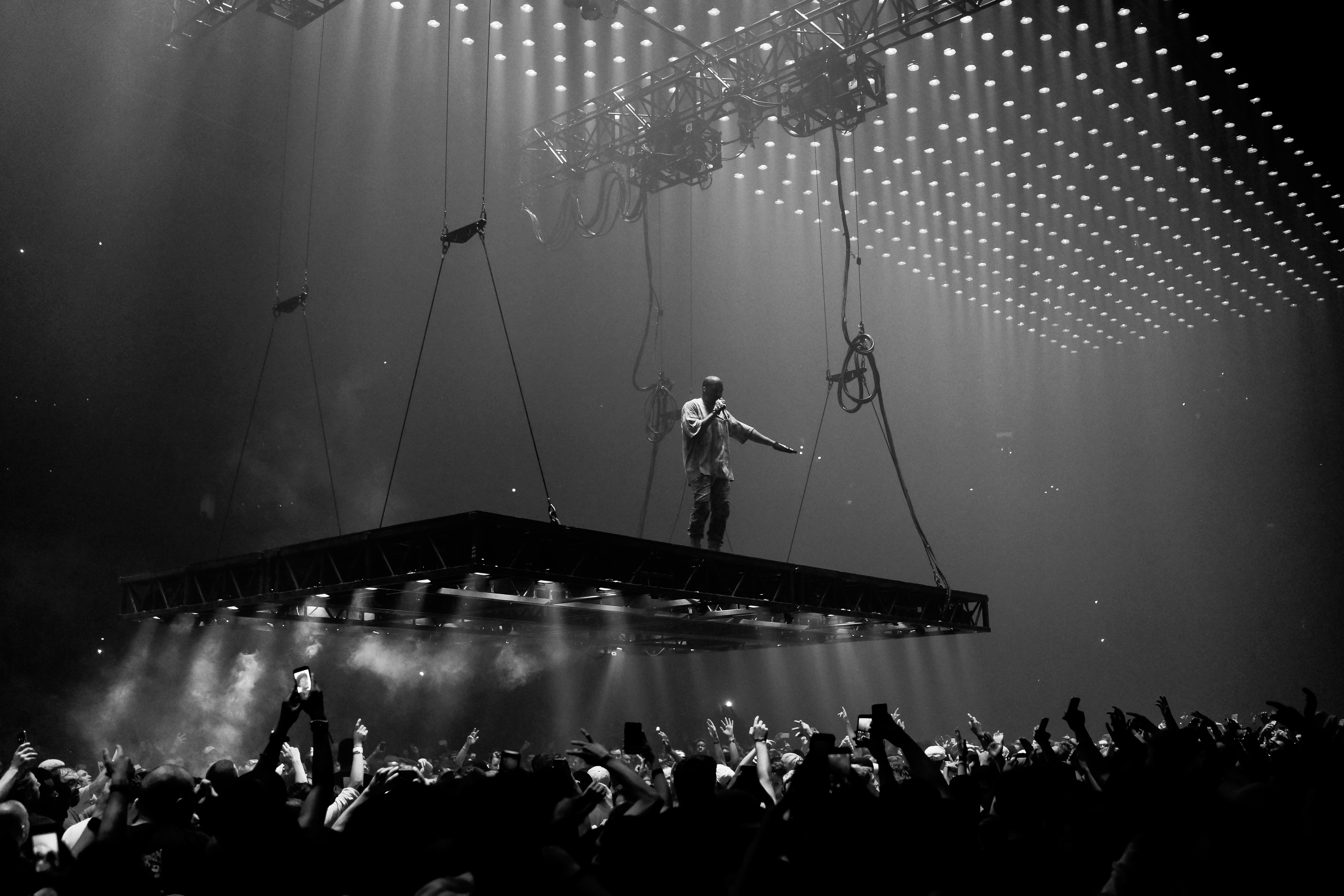
West performed the Saint Pablo Tour in 2016 for support of the album.

In August 2016, West embarked on the Saint Pablo Tour in support of The Life of Pablo, two months after announcing it. The performances featured a floating platform, the first time West had used one. West postponed several dates in October following the Paris robbery of his then-wife Kim Kardashian. The remainder of the tour was canceled on November 21, 2016, following controversy over comments West made that week supporting president-elect Donald Trump and public criticism by other artists; fellow rapper Snoop Dogg spoke negatively of West's critical comments. West was admitted for psychiatric observation at the UCLA Medical Center later that month. Before its cancellation, the Saint Pablo Tour was set to run until December 2016.

== Artwork and title ==
On February 11, 2016, West revealed the album's artwork, designed by Belgian artist Peter De Potter. De Potter's level of fame at the time was not as great as that of artists such as George Condo and Takashi Murakami, who had previously designed cover art for West. As De Potter had collaborated with fashion designer Raf Simons in the past, and West had cited him as an influence, there was much speculation that Simons was the reason the two became involved with each other. The artwork was described as a "post-modern cover" and it displays the album's title in all caps, repeated multiple times with inconsistent formatting, and a small family photo in the bottom corner. West shared another cover for The Life of Pablo on the same date with the phrase "which one" on it that was included on the notepad of the final track list, and a cropped photo of British model Sheniz Halil that shows her buttocks; this artwork was used for the official release. Kim Kardashian reportedly chose Halil for the artwork. After this information was revealed, Halil's Instagram popularity increased. In response to being selected, Halil said in an interview with the New York Daily News that she "couldn't be more flattered and honoured", thanking both West and Kardashian.

By titling his album The Life of Pablo, West confused people as to which Pablo he was referencing with the title. Pablo Escobar, Pablo Neruda, Pablo Picasso and a child named Pablo who famously shouted his support of West for president at the 2015 VMAs were viewed as potential people referenced in the album's title. MTV pointed to the title being in reference to Picasso, as West had said during a 2015 lecture at the University of Oxford that if he "was going to do art, fine art", then he would have aimed "to become Picasso or greater". By writing "Which one?" on his notepad, West hinted that he might not remember the meaning of the title he had chosen. West eventually revealed the meaning during an episode of the American talk show Kocktails with Khloé in April 2016. His then sister-in-law Khloé Kardashian asked him, "Who the fuck is Pablo"? He replied the title was inspired by Escobar, Picasso and the Apostle Paul, since Paul translates into Pablo in Spanish. Writing for The Guardian, Jonathan Jones drew an artistic comparison between West and Picasso, claiming that West's sampling of music, "reworking old songs" and "mixing it all up" is similar to the way in which Picasso "first put bits of the real world into modern art".

== Critical reception ==
The Life of Pablo ratings
Aggregate scores
Source	Rating
AnyDecentMusic?	7.4/10
Metacritic	75/100
Review scores
Source	Rating
AllMusic	3.5/5 stars
The Daily Telegraph	3/5 stars
Entertainment Weekly	B+
The Guardian	3/5 stars
NME	4/5
Pitchfork	9.0/10
Rolling Stone	4.5/5 stars
Spin	8/10
USA Today	3.5/4 stars
Vice (Expert Witness)	A−

According to the review aggregator Metacritic, The Light of Pablo was met with "universal acclaim" based on a weighted average score of 75 out of 100 from 35 critic scores. Aggregator AnyDecentMusic? gave it 7.4 out of 10, based on their assessment of the critical consensus.

Rob Sheffield dubbed it both a mess and masterpiece: "This is a messy album that feels like it was made that way on purpose." He elaborated, writing that "West just drops broken pieces of his psyche all over the album and challenges you to fit them together". Corbin Reiff opined that The Life of Pablo "feels far different from any of the tightly constructed, singular works of West's past", asserting instead that "as a beautiful, messy, mixed-up collection of 18 songs, it's a brilliant document". Writing for The New York Times, Jon Caramanica said West "has perfected the art of aesthetic and intellectual bricolage, shape-shifting in real time and counting on listeners to keep up", concluding "this is Tumblr-as-album, the piecing together of divergent fragments to make a cohesive whole". In a highly positive review, Jayson Greene wrote that all of West's work is animated by "a madcap sense of humor", and claimed "The Life of Pablo has a freewheeling energy that is infectious and unique to his discography", finding that it manages to come across "as both his most labored-over and unfinished album, full of asterisks and corrections and footnotes". Robert Christgau of Vice found the record "wittingly casual and easy on the ears", writing that, "unlike Yeezus, it won't top many 2016 lists—it's too blatantly imperfect, too flagrantly unfocused. But that's also its charm, and I prefer it". Spin's Greg Tate wrote that "even if Mr. West feels (for now, at least) that his best years as a rap superstar are behind him, there's still hella great beats roaming around that dazed and befuddling noggin per The Life of Pablo for dang sure" and described the album as "long on musical confidence and short on inspirational verses". He viewed the "plaintive vulnerability and alienation" expressed by West as at least seeming "cathartically crafted". Writing for USA Today, Patrick Ryan claimed that even though the album "may not deliver on West's promise of being 'the album of the life', it's undeniably the work of one of music's most boundary-pushing artists and will give fans plenty to unpack".

Ray Rahman was less enthusiastic, calling The Life of Pablo "an ambitious album that finds the rapper struggling to compact his many identities into one weird, uncomfortable, glorious whole". He elaborated, claiming that like West "himself, the album is emotional, explosive, unpredictable, and undeniably thrilling". Alexis Petridis expressed further criticism in The Guardian, finding the album "at turns, rambling, chaotic, deeply underwhelming, impressively audacious, and completely infuriating", suggesting that it "appears to have had ideas thrown at it until it feels messy and incoherent", despite concluding that "when The Life of Pablo is good, it's very good indeed". Neil McCormick wrote, "The Life of Pablo is certainly rich in musical scope, chock a block with inspired ideas", but he felt the work to be "so self-involved it crosses over into self-delusion, marked by such a tangible absence of perspective and objectivity". In a mixed review, Greg Kot expressed the viewpoint that "The Life of Pablo sounds like a work in progress rather than a finished album", though he claimed that "West comes off as a man with hundreds of ideas in play all at once" who lacks any filter.

=== Rankings ===
The Life of Pablo appeared on several year-end lists of the best albums of 2016. Dummy ranked the album as the best of 2016, claiming that "it delivered some of the hugest musical moments of the year", noting elements of songs such as "Ultralight Beam" and "Pt. 2". Caramanica also named The Life of Pablo the best album of the year and called it: "A grand, caustic album about grace: finding it, praying for it, falling from it." Time Out London was among the three publications to list The Life of Pablo as the best album of 2016, writing that "the incredible, exciting and daring The Life of Pablo really does show Kanye as a restless, Jobs-esque genius, with a flair for convening talented people and getting exceptional work out of them".

As well as ranking at number three on the Pitchfork Readers' Poll: Top 50 Albums of 2016, the album was voted fifth by readers for both the most underrated and most overrated album of the year. On the Top 50 Songs of 2016 poll, "Ultralight Beam" ranked at number one. "Real Friends" and "No More Parties in LA" also appeared on the list as the 13th and 16th best songs, respectively. In February 2016, Inverse named The Life of Pablo West's best album. In 2024, Paste named the album as the 86th greatest of all time.

Select rankings of The Life of Pablo
Publication	List	Rank	Ref.
The A.V. Club	The A.V. Club's Top 50 Albums of 2016	18	
Billboard	Billboard's 50 Best Albums of 2016	2	
The Guardian	Best Albums of 2016	4	
The New York Times	The Best Albums of 2016 (Jon Caramanica's list)	1	
Paste	The 50 Best Albums of 2016	11	
Paste	The 300 Greatest Albums of All Time	86	
Pitchfork	The 50 Best Albums of 2016	5	
Pitchfork	Pitchfork Readers' Poll: Top 50 Albums of 2016	3	
Spin	The 50 Best Albums of 2016	13	
Time Out London	The Best Albums of 2016	1	
The Village Voice	Pazz & Jop Critics Poll of 2016	10	
The Wire	Top 50 Releases of the Year	13	

=== Industry awards ===
At the 2016 BET Hip Hop Awards, The Life of Pablo was nominated for Album of the Year. The album received a nomination for Best Rap Album at the 2017 Grammy Awards, ultimately losing to Chance the Rapper's third mixtape Coloring Book. At the same ceremony, "Ultralight Beam" and "Famous" were both nominated in the categories of Best Rap/Sung Performance and Best Rap Song. West's failure to win any awards gave him a streak of losing 16 Grammy nominations in a row. Despite The Life of Pablo being more successful in terms of Grammy nominations than Yeezus, My Beautiful Dark Twisted Fantasy and West's fourth studio album 808s & Heartbreak (2008), several publications viewed the lack of a nomination for Album of the Year as being a snub. Writing for Bustle, Sam Rullo called West's lack of a nomination for the award "so disappointing", though he claimed that "the snub can't be deemed surprising, because it follows in a long tradition of the awards show shying away from his more experimental albums". Rullo also claimed that other tracks from The Life of Pablo should have been nominated in award categories as well as "Ultralight Beam" and "Famous". The Life of Pablo was nominated for Best Album at the 2017 NME Awards. At the 2016 Soul Train Music Awards, the album earned a nomination for Album of the Year.

== Commercial performance ==
After being made available solely on Tidal, The Life of Pablo failed to chart initially because West declined to share the streaming numbers with Nielsen Music. The album was reportedly subject to over 500,000 illegal downloads within 24 hours of its release, becoming the most illegally downloaded album ever and causing a resurgence in the file sharing of music. Despite West asking Tidal to withhold streaming numbers for The Life of Pablo in February, the service revealed in March 2016 that the album was streamed over 250 million times within ten days of being released. In May 2018, the Norwegian newspaper Dagens Næringsliv published an investigative report that accused Tidal of manipulating Beyonce's Lemonade and Kanye West's Life of Pablo streaming numbers. The report claimed that "listener numbers on Tidal have been manipulated to the tune of several hundred million false plays"; the service denied the report.

On April 9, 2016, Billboard reported that after The Life of Pablo had been released to services other than Tidal the album was set to debut atop the US Billboard 200 and had sold 90,000 album-equivalent units at the time. The Life of Pablo was a chart-topping debut on the issue dating April 23, 2016. It became West's seventh consecutive number one studio album in the United States, selling 94,000 album-equivalent units. 28,000 of the album-equivalent units for The Life of Pablo were pure album sales, while the remaining 66,000 units were streaming equivalent albums that equated to over 99 million streams and accounted for 70% of the units. This stood as the first time an album had topped the Billboard 200 with the majority of the units coming from streaming equivalent albums, surpassing the previous benchmark of 44.6% set by Rihanna's eighth studio album Anti (2016). The Life of Pablo's 66,000 streaming equivalent albums stood as the second highest streaming sum behind the 67,000 by Canadian singer Justin Bieber's fourth studio album Purpose (2015).

In its second week on the Billboard 200, The Life of Pablo descended three places to number four and pushed 47,000 album-equivalent units, experiencing a 50% decline from the first week's sales. The album dropped 95% in pure album sales, selling around 1,000 copies. The album ranked as the 27th most popular album of 2016 on the Billboard 200, while ranking at number 88 on the US Top R&B/Hip-Hop Albums chart for that year. On April 4, 2017, The Life of Pablo was certified platinum in the US by the RIAA for sales of one million album-equivalent units, 798,000 of which had been sold up to January 1. Though it had been confirmed that the RIAA do not break out the components of any certifications, West's label Def Jam confirmed the album was certified from streaming-only. This made it stand as the first streaming-only album to go platinum in the US and also gave West his eighth album to achieve an RIAA certification of platinum or higher. The album was certified triple platinum in the US by the RIAA for selling three million album-equivalent units on October 26, 2022.

The Life of Pablo debuted at number one on the Norwegian Albums Chart and remained on it for 62 weeks, giving West his first chart-topping solo album in the country. The album peaked at number two on the Swedish Albums chart, ultimately ranking as the 55th most popular album of 2016 on the chart. In Denmark, The Life of Pablo attained the same peak position on the Danish Albums chart. The album ranked as the 12th most popular album of 2016 on the chart. On November 12, 2018, The Life of Pablo was certified double platinum in Denmark by IFPI Danmark for shipments of 40,000 copies. The album debuted on the Finnish Albums (Top 50) chart at number 12 and climbed seven places to number five in its second week on the chart. On the Canadian Albums Chart, The Life of Pablo entered at number six and ranked as the 40th most popular album of 2016 on the chart. In the week of Jesus Is King's release in 2019, The Life of Pablo rose 93 places from number 159 to number 66 on the Canadian Albums chart, increasing in consumption units by 51%. The album reached number eight on the Dutch Album Top 100 and ranked as the 72nd most popular album on the chart in 2016. The same position was attained by The Life of Pablo on the Irish Albums Chart. On the UK Albums Chart, the album charted at number 30. It stood as West's eighth top 40 album in the UK and spent 47 weeks on the chart. The Life of Pablo was certified gold in the UK by the BPI on March 3, 2017, for sales of 100,000 album-equivalent units that were the results of streams, becoming the first album to ever do so in the country. Official Charts data reported that the 100,000 units required for being gold accounted to each song being streamed an average of 10.5 million times and that the album equivalent streams amounted to 100,316.

The same week that The Life of Pablo debuted on the Billboard 200, 12 of the tracks appeared on the US Hot R&B/Hip-Hop Songs chart, with "Famous" charting the highest at number 13. However, since the song had debuted on the chart a week prior, only 11 of the 12 tracks entered the Hot R&B/Hip-Hop Songs that week; the entry of "Father Stretch My Hands, Pt. 1" at number 14 stood as the highest debut. Eight of the tracks debuted on the Billboard Hot 100, with "Famous" having the highest entry at number 34. The tracks appearing on the charts lead to West reaching a new peak of number three on the Billboard Artist 100, which was the first time he reached the top ten of the chart. On the UK Singles Chart, nine of the tracks charted upon the album's release, with "Famous" having the highest debut by opening at number 33.

== Track listing ==
The Life of Pablo track listing
No.	Title	Writer(s)	Producer(s)	Length
1.	"Ultralight Beam"	Kanye West; Michael Dean; Kelly Price; Terius Nash; Nico Segal; Kirk Franklin; Kasseem Dean; Chancelor Bennett; Noah Goldstein; Jerome Potter; Samuel Griesemer; Cydel Young; Malik Jones; Derek Watkins	West; Mike Dean; Chance the Rapper; Swizz Beatz; Rick Rubin^{[a]}; Watkins^{[a]}; Plain Pat^{[c]}; DJDS^{[c]}; Goldstein^{[c]}	5:20
2.	"Father Stretch My Hands, Pt. 1"	West; Scott Mescudi; Rubin; M. Dean; Goldstein; Leland Wayne; Young; Allen Ritter; Potter; Griesemer; Bennett; Jones; T. L. Barrett^{[b]}	West; M. Dean; Rubin; Metro Boomin^{[a]}; DJDS^{[c]}; Ritter^{[c]}; Goldstein^{[c]}	2:15
3.	"Pt. 2"	West; Rubin; Young; Sidney Selby III^{[d]}; Adnan Khan^{[d]}; Caroline Shaw; Pat Reynolds; Barrett^{[b]}	West; Menace; Rubin; Plain Pat^{[a]}; Shaw^{[c]}	2:10
4.	"Famous"	West; Kejuan Muchita; Goldstein; Ernest Brown; Andrew Dawson; M. Dean; Bennett; K. Dean; Young; Ross Birchard; Reynolds; Jones; Jimmy Webb^{[e]}; Winston Riley^{[e]}; Luis Bacalov^{[e]}; Enzo Vita^{[e]}; Sergio Bardotti^{[e]}; Giampiero Scalamogna^{[e]}	West; Havoc; Goldstein^{[a]}; Charlie Heat^{[a]}; Dawson^{[a]}; Hudson Mohawke^{[c]}; M. Dean^{[c]}; Plain Pat^{[c]}	3:16
5.	"Feedback"	West; Brown; Goldstein; Young; Darius Jenkins; K. Rachel Mills; Marcus Byrd; Bennett; Jones; Ardalan Sarfaraz^{[f]}; Manouchehr Cheshmazar^{[f]}	West; Charlie Heat^{[a]}; Goldstein^{[a]}	2:27
6.	"Low Lights"	West; M. Dean; Potter; Griesemer; Sandy Rivera^{[g]}	West; DJDS; M. Dean^{[c]}	2:11
7.	"Highlights"	West; M. Dean; Tyler Bryant; Joshua Luellen; Reynolds; Goldstein; Nash; Young; Jeffery Williams; Greg Phillinganes; Jamichael Hall; Jones	West; M. Dean; Velous^{[a]}; Southside^{[a]}; Plain Pat^{[c]}; Goldstein^{[c]}	3:19
8.	"Freestyle 4"	West; M. Dean; Young; Selby; Birchard; Potter; Griesemer; Goldstein; Caroline Shaw; Trevor Gureckis; Jones; Alison Goldfrapp^{[h]}; Robert Locke^{[h]}; Timothy Norfolk^{[h]}; William Gregory^{[h]}	West; Hudson Mohawke^{[a]}; Goldstein^{[a]}; M. Dean^{[a]}; DJDS^{[c]}; Shaw^{[c]}; Gureckis^{[c]}	2:03
9.	"I Love Kanye"	West; Jones	West	0:44
10.	"Waves"	West; Christopher M. Brown; Mescudi; Young; Tony Williams; Elon Rutberg; Birchard; Watkins; M. Dean; Bennett; Wayne; Jones; Brown; Fred Brathwaithe^{[i]}; Robin Diggs^{[i]}; Kevin Ferguson^{[i]}; Theodore Livingston^{[i]}; Darryl Mason^{[i]}; James Whipper^{[i]}	West; Charlie Heat; Hudson Mohawke^{[a]}; Metro Boomin^{[a]}; M. Dean^{[a]}; Anthony Kilhoffer^{[c]}	3:01
11.	"FML"	West; Abel Tesfaye; Young; M. Dean; Dawson; Goldstein; Wayne; Brown; Christian Boggs; Jenkins; Mills; Byrd; Birchard; Jacques Webster; Jones; Lawrence Cassidy^{[j]}; Vincent Cassidy^{[j]}; Paul Wiggin^{[j]}	West; Mitus; Metro Boomin^{[a]}; Goldstein^{[a]}; M. Dean^{[a]}; Hudson Mohawke^{[c]}; Dawson^{[c]}	3:56
12.	"Real Friends"	West; Matthew Samuels; Adam Feeney; Muchita; Darren King; Young; Glenda Proby; Tyrone Griffin Jr.; M. Dean; Goldstein; Rupert Thomas; Jones; Jalil Hutchins^{[k]}; Lawrence Smith^{[k]}	West; Boi-1da; Frank Dukes^{[a]}; Havoc^{[c]}; King^{[c]}; M. Dean^{[c]}; Goldstein; Sevn Thomas^{[c]}	4:11
13.	"Wolves"	West; Sia Furler; Victor Mensah; Magnus August Høiberg; Alan Stanley Soucy Brinsmead; Goldstein; Rutberg; Jones; Freddy Wexler; Young; Ryan McDermott; M. Dean; Kirby Lauryen; Reynolds; Shaw	West; Cashmere Cat; Sinjin Hawke; M. Dean; Goldstein^{[c]}; Shaw^{[c]}	5:01
14.	"Frank's Track"	West; Christopher Breaux; Høiberg; Brinsmead	West; Cashmere Cat; Sinjin Hawke	0:38
15.	"Siiiiiiiiilver Surffffeeeeer Intermission"	Charly Wingate; Karim Kharbouch	West	0:56
16.	"30 Hours"	West; Karriem Riggins; M. Dean; Aubrey Graham; Charles Arthur Russell^{[l]}; Cornell Haynes^{[l]}; Jason Epperson^{[l]}; Pharrell Williams^{[l]}; Charles L. Brown^{[l]}; Isaac Hayes^{[l]}	West; Riggins; M. Dean	5:23
17.	"No More Parties in LA"	West; Kendrick Duckworth; Otis Jackson Jr.; Jones; John Watson^{[m]}; Walter Morrison^{[m]}; Herbert Rooney^{[m]}; Ronald Bean^{[m]}; Highleigh Crizoe^{[m]}; Dennis Coles^{[m]}; Larry Graham^{[m]}; Tina Graham^{[m]}; Sam Dees^{[m]}	West; Madlib	6:14
18.	"Facts" (Charlie Heat version)	West; Young; Brown; Goldstein; Luellen; Nicholas Smith^{[n]}; A. Graham^{[n]}; Wayne^{[n]}; Nayvadius Wilburn^{[n]}	West; Metro Boomin; Southside; Charlie Heat	3:20
19.	"Fade"	West; Griffin; Austin Post; Kilhoffer; Benjamin Benstead; M. Dean; Ryan Vojtesak; Potter; Griesemer; Goldstein; Jones; Norman Whitfield^{[o]}; Eddie Holland^{[o]}; Cornelius Grant^{[o]}; Larry Heard^{[o]}; Robert Owens^{[o]}; Louie Vega^{[o]}; Ronald Carroll^{[o]}; Barbara Tucker^{[o]}; Harold Matthews^{[o]}; Stephen Garrett^{[o]}; Rapture Stewart^{[o]}; Eric Seats^{[o]}	West; Kilhoffer^{[a]}; Benji B^{[a]}; M. Dean^{[a]}; Charlie Handsome^{[a]}; DJDS^{[c]}; Goldstein^{[c]}	3:13
20.	"Saint Pablo"	West; Sampha Sisay; M. Dean; Ritter; Shawn Carter^{[p]}; Deric Angelettie^{[p]}; Ronald Lawrence^{[p]}; Whitfield^{[p]}	West; M. Dean; Ritter^{[a]}; Goldstein^{[c]}	6:12
Total length:				66:01

Notes

- ^{^[a]} signifies a co-producer
- ^{^[c]} signifies an additional producer
- "Ultralight Beam" features vocals by Chance the Rapper, Kirk Franklin, The-Dream, and Kelly Price, and additional vocals by Natalie and Samoria Green
- "Father Stretch My Hands Pt. 1" features vocals by Kid Cudi and Kelly Price
- "Pt. 2" features vocals by Desiigner and Caroline Shaw
- "Famous" features vocals by Rihanna and Swizz Beatz
- "Highlights" features vocals by Young Thug, and additional vocals by The-Dream, El DeBarge, and Kelly Price
- "Freestyle 4" features vocals by Desiigner
- "Waves" features vocals by Chris Brown and Kid Cudi
- "FML" features vocals by the Weeknd, and additional vocals by Caroline Shaw
- "Real Friends" features vocals by Ty Dolla Sign
- "Wolves" features vocals by Vic Mensa, Sia, and Caroline Shaw
- "Frank's Track" features uncredited vocals by Frank Ocean
- "Siiiiiiiiilver Surffffeeeeer Intermission" features vocals by Max B and French Montana
- "30 Hours" features background vocals by André Benjamin
- "No More Parties in LA" features vocals by Kendrick Lamar
- "Fade" features vocals by Post Malone and Ty Dolla Sign
- "Saint Pablo" features vocals by Sampha

Sample credits

- ^{^[b]} Both parts of "Father Stretch My Hands" contain samples of "Father I Stretch My Hands", written and performed by Pastor T. L. Barrett featuring Youth for Christ.
- ^{^[d]} "Pt. 2" additionally contains samples of "Panda", written by Sidney Selby III and Adnan Khan, and performed by Desiigner.
- ^{^[e]} "Famous" contains samples of:
  - "Do What You Gotta Do", written by Jimmy Webb and performed by Nina Simone;
  - "Bam Bam", written by Winston Riley and performed by Sister Nancy;
  - and "Mi Sono Svegliato E... Ho Chiuso Gli Occhi", written by Luis Bacalov, Sergio Bardotti, Giampiero Scalamogna, and Enzo Vita, and performed by Il Rovescio della Medaglia.
- ^{^[f]} "Feedback" contains samples of "Talagh", written by Ardalan Sarfaraz and Manouchehr Cheshmazar, and performed by Googoosh.
- ^{^[g]} "Low Lights" contains samples of "So Alive (Acapella)", written by Sandy Rivera and performed by Kings of Tomorrow.
- ^{^[h]} "Freestyle 4" contains samples of "Human", written by Alison Goldfrapp, Robert Locke, Timothy Norfolk, and William Gregory, and performed by Goldfrapp.
- ^{^[i]} "Waves" contains samples and elements of "Fantastic Freaks at the Dixie", written by Fred Bratwaithe, Robin Diggs, Kevin Ferguson, Theodore Livingston, Darryl Mason, and James Whipper, and performed by Fantastic Freaks.
- ^{^[j]} "FML" contains interpolations of "Hit", written by Lawrence Cassidy, Vincent Cassidy, and Paul Wiggin, and performed by Section 25.
- ^{^[k]} "Real Friends" contains interpolations of "Friends", written by Jalil Hutchins and Lawrence Smith, and performed by Whodini.
- "Wolves" contains samples of "Walking Dub", written and performed by Sugar Minott.
- ^{^[l]} "30 Hours" contains:
  - samples of "Answers Me", written and performed by Arthur Russell;
  - interpolations of "Hot in Herre", written by Cornell Haynes, Pharrell Williams, and Charles Brown, and performed by Nelly;
  - interpolations of "E.I.", written by Cornell Haynes and Jason Epperson, and performed by Nelly;
  - samples of "Joy", written and performed by Isaac Hayes.
- ^{^[m]} "No More Parties in LA" contains samples of:
  - "Give Me My Love", written and performed by Johnny "Guitar" Watson;
  - "Suzie Thundertussy", written and performed by Walter "Junie" Morrison;
  - "Mighty Healthy", written by Herbert Rooney, Ronald Bean, Highleigh Crizoe, and Dennis Coles, and performed by Ghostface Killah;
  - and "Stand Up and Shout About Love", written by Larry Graham Jr., Tina Graham, and Sam Dees, and performed by Larry Graham.
- ^{^[n]} "Facts" (Charlie Heat version) contains:
  - samples of "Dirt and Grime", written by Nicholas Smith and performed by Father's Children;
  - interpolations of "Jumpman", written by Aubrey Graham, Leland Wayne, and Nayvadius Wilburn, and performed by Drake and Future;
  - sound effects from the video game Street Fighter II.
- ^{^[o]} "Fade" contains samples of:
  - versions of "(I Know) I'm Losing You", written by Eddie Holland, Norman Whitfield, and Cornelius Grant, as performed by Rare Earth and the Undisputed Truth, respectively;
  - "Mystery of Love", written by Larry Heard and Robert Owens, and performed by Mr. Fingers;
  - "Deep Inside", written by Louie Vega and performed by Hardrive;
  - "I Get Lifted (The Underground Network Mix)", written by Louie Vega, Ronald Carroll, Barbara Tucker, and Harold Matthews, and performed by Tucker;
  - and an interpolation of "Rock the Boat", written by Stephen Garrett, Rapture Stewart, and Eric Seats, and performed by Aaliyah.
- ^{^[p]} "Saint Pablo" contains samples of "Where I'm From", written by Shawn Carter, Deric Angelettie, Ronald Lawrence, and Norman Whitfield, and performed by Jay-Z.

== Personnel ==
Credits adapted from West's website and Tidal.

Technical

- Andrew Dawson – engineering (1–8, 10, 11, 13, 16–20)
- Mike Dean – engineering (1–8, 10, 11, 13, 16, 18–20), mastering (all tracks)
- Noah Goldstein – engineering (1–13, 16–20), mixing (9, 14, 15)
- Anthony Kilhoffer – engineering (1–8, 10, 11, 13, 16, 18–20)
- Mike Malchicoff – engineering (1, 7)
- Nathaniel Alford – engineering (7)
- Dee Brown – engineering (7)
- Alex Tumay – engineering (7)
- Tom Kahre – engineering (8, 10)
- Ty Dolla Sign – engineering (12)
- French Montana – engineering (15)
- MixedByAli – engineering (17)
- Manny Marroquin – mixing (1–8, 10–13, 16–20)
- Kez Khou – mix assistance (7, 13)
- Chris Galland – mix assistance (12, 17, 20)
- Jeff Jackson – mix assistance (12, 17, 20)
- Ike Schultz – mix assistance (12, 17, 20)
- Kuk Harrell – vocal production for Rihanna (4)
- Zeke Mishanec – vocals recording for Swizz Beatz (4)
- Marcos Tovar – vocals recording for Rihanna (4)
- Shin Kamiyama – vocals recording for The Weeknd (11)
- Joe Balaguer – vocals assistance for Rihanna (4)

Musicians

- Mike Dean – keyboards (1, 2, 7, 11, 12), bass guitar (1), Moog modular (2), vocoder (16)
- Donnie Trumpet – trumpets (1)
- Anthony Evans – choir contracting (1)
- Shanika Bereal – choir (1)
- Kenyon Dixon – choir (1)
- Aaron Encinas – choir (1)
- Crystal Lewis Ray – choir (1)
- LaKesha Shantell – choir (1)
- Tiffany Stevenson – choir (1)
- Chavonne Stewart – choir (1)
- Rachel Whitlow – choir (1)
- George Young – choir (1)
- Greg Phillinganes – keyboards (7)

Design

- Virgil Abloh – assistant creative direction
- Peter De Potter – album artwork design
- Donda – art direction
  - Joe Perez
  - Mark Seekings
  - Justin Saunders
  - Nate Brown
- Ryan Dwyer – photography
- Sheniz H – photo model
- Kanye West – creative direction

== Charts ==
=== Weekly charts ===
2016 chart performance for The Life of Pablo
Chart (2016–2017)	Peak position
Canadian Albums (Billboard)	6
Danish Albums (Hitlisten)	2
Dutch Albums (Album Top 100)	8
Finnish Albums (Suomen virallinen lista)	5
Irish Albums (IRMA)	8
Norwegian Albums (VG-lista)	1
Swedish Albums (Sverigetopplistan)	2
UK Albums (Official Charts)	30
US Billboard 200	1
US Top R&B/Hip-Hop Albums (Billboard)	2

2019 chart performance for The Life of Pablo
Chart (2019)	Peak position
Canadian Albums (Billboard)	66
Lithuanian Albums (AGATA)	78
US Billboard 200	70

2021 chart performance for The Life of Pablo
Chart (2021)	Peak position
Australian Albums (ARIA)	65
Belgian Albums (Ultratop Flanders)	101

2026 chart performance for The Life of Pablo
Chart (2026)	Peak position
Portuguese Albums (AFP)	156

=== Year-end charts ===
Year-end chart performance
Chart (2016)	Position
Canadian Albums (Billboard)	40
Danish Albums (Hitlisten)	12
Dutch Albums (MegaCharts)	72
Icelandic Albums (Tónlistinn)	50
Swedish Albums (Sverigetopplistan)	55
US Billboard 200	27
US Top R&B/Hip-Hop Albums (Billboard)	88

Year-end chart performance
Chart (2017)	Position
Danish Albums (Hitlisten)	39
Icelandic Albums (Tónlistinn)	48
US Billboard 200	64
US Top R&B/Hip-Hop Albums (Billboard)	48

Year-end chart performance
Chart (2018)	Position
Danish Albums (Hitlisten)	89
Icelandic Albums (Tónlistinn)	91
US Billboard 200	143

Year-end chart performance
Chart (2021)	Position
Icelandic Albums (Tónlistinn)	64

Year-end chart performance
Chart (2022)	Position
Icelandic Albums (Tónlistinn)	81

Year-end chart performance
Chart (2023)	Position
Icelandic Albums (Tónlistinn)	94

=== Decade-end charts ===
Decade-end chart performance
Chart (2010–2019)	Position
US Billboard 200	185

== Certifications ==
Certifications and sales
Region	Certification	Certified units/sales
Australia (ARIA)	Platinum	70,000^{‡}
Canada (Music Canada)	2× Platinum	160,000^{‡}
Denmark (IFPI Danmark)	4× Platinum	80,000^{‡}
France (SNEP)	Gold	50,000^{‡}
Italy (FIMI)	Gold	25,000^{‡}
New Zealand (RMNZ)	Platinum	15,000^{‡}
Poland (ZPAV)	Platinum	20,000^{‡}
United Kingdom (BPI)	Platinum	300,000^{‡}
United States (RIAA)	3× Platinum	3,000,000^{‡}
^{‡} Sales+streaming figures based on certification alone.

== Release history ==
Release dates and formats
Region	Date	Label(s)	Format(s)	Ref.
Various	February 14, 2016	GOOD; Def Jam	Streaming (Tidal exclusive)	
Various	April 1, 2016	GOOD; Def Jam	Streaming; digital download	

== See also ==
- 2016 in hip-hop
- GOOD Fridays
- List of Billboard 200 number-one albums of 2016
- List of number-one albums in Norway
