= Freestyle 4 =

Song by Kanye West

from the album The Life of Pablo
- Released: February 14, 2016
- Recorded: 2015–16
- Genre: Experimental hip hop
- Length: 2:03
- Label: GOOD; Def Jam
- Songwriters: West; Mike Dean; Cydel Young; Sidney Royel Selby III; Ross Matthew Birchard; Samuel Griesemer; Noah Goldstein; Caroline Shaw; Trevor Gureckis; Alison Goldfrapp; Robert Locke; Timothy Norfolk; William Gregory
- Producers: West; Hudson Mohawke (Note: Credited as co-producer); Goldstein; Dean; DJDS (Note: Credited as additional producer); Shaw; Gureckis

"Freestyle 4" is a song by American rapper Kanye West from his seventh studio album, The Life of Pablo (2016). It features vocals from American rapper Desiigner. It was remixed by Tyler, the Creator in March 2016 as "What the Fuck Right Now".

== Composition ==
The track prominently samples the beginning of the 2000 song "Human" by Goldfrapp, resulting in Will Gregory and Alison Goldfrapp being credited as songwriters.

By the time that all of the changes had been made to The Life of Pablo in June 2016, a different instrumental popped up at the 45-second mark and more synths were added.

== Remixes ==
On March 3, 2016, Odd Future rapper Tyler, the Creator released a remix of "Freestyle 4" titled "What the Fuck Right Now", which featured ASAP Rocky. Shortly before releasing his remix, Tyler had shown that he was a fan of the song. West tweeted out his approval of the remix three days after it was released.

LSDXOXO remixed the original on May 25, 2016, putting a Baltimore club spin on it. A remix of the song by West featuring ASAP Ferg and Big Sean was subject to an online leak on August 5, 2017.

== Critical reception ==
Tom Thorogood of The Line of Best Fit viewed "Freestyle 4" as "[picking] up where Daft Punk left off on Yeezus with Kanye rapping over electro beats and Hitchcock strings". Its "dense claustrophobia" was pointed out in praise by Nosheen Iqbal of The Guardian.

== Commercial performance ==
Upon the release of The Life of Pablo in February 2016, the track debuted at number 9 on the US Billboard Bubbling Under Hot 100. Within the same week, it reached number 43 on the US Hot R&B/Hip-Hop Songs chart.

== Credits and personnel ==
Credits adapted from West's official website.

- Vocals – Desiigner
- Production – Kanye West
- Co-production – Hudson Mohawke, Noah Goldstein and Mike Dean
- Additional production – DJDS, Caroline Shaw and Trevor Gureckis
- Engineering – Goldstein, Andrew Dawson, Anthony Kilhoffer, Dean and Tom Kahre
- Mix engineer – Manny Marroquin at Larrabee Studios, North Hollywood, California
- Mix assistants – Chris Galland, Ike Schultz and Jeff Jackson

== Charts ==
Chart (2016)	Peak position
UK Singles (Official Charts Company)	132
UK Hip Hop/R&B (Official Charts)	38
US Bubbling Under Hot 100 (Billboard)	9
US Hot R&B/Hip-Hop Songs (Billboard)	43
US On-Demand Streaming Songs (Billboard)	40

== Certifications ==
Region	Certification	Certified units/sales
United States (RIAA)	Gold	500,000^{‡}
^{‡} Sales+streaming figures based on certification alone.
