= Highlights (song) =

Song by Kanye West

from the album The Life of Pablo
- Released: February 14, 2016
- Recorded: 2015–2016
- Genre: Hip hop; gospel
- Length: 3:19
- Label: GOOD; Def Jam
- Songwriters: Kanye West; The-Dream; Noah Goldstein; Cyhi the Prynce; Jeffery Williams; Mike Dean; Greg Phillinganes; Tyler Bryant; Joshua Luellen; Pat Reynolds
- Producers: West; Dean; Velous (co.); Southside (co.); Plain Pat (add.); Goldstein (add.)

"Highlights" is a song by American hip-hop artist Kanye West, from his seventh studio album, The Life of Pablo (2016). The song features vocals from Young Thug and The-Dream. One day before the album was released, West performed the song on Saturday Night Live with Young Thug, El DeBarge, Kelly Price and The-Dream. Within the track, West takes a shot at Ray J. The song was met with mixed reviews from music critics. It was revealed in July 2016 that West had shot a music video, but it was never released.

== Composition and lyrics ==
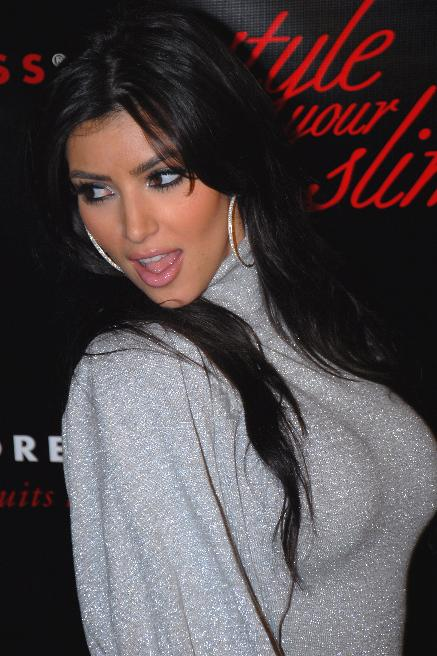
"Highlights" features West rapping about his life with television personality and model Kim Kardashian.

The track comes straight after "Low Lights" on The Life of Pablo, with the previous song essentially serving as an intro to "Highlights". The transition to Bible references in the song from those in "Low Lights" suggests that West believes his spirituality helped bring him success. When working on the song, West and those around him knew the feel that they were going for.

By the time that all the changes had been made to the album in June 2016, the song was remixed with Thug's vocals sounding more polished.

West references his brother-in-law Rob Kardashian in the track with the lines: "Blac Chyna fucking Rob, help him with the weight/I wish my trainer would, tell me what I overate". Despite these lines being rapped by him, West showed support for Rob two months afterwards, showing that the content was a playful jab and not intended as a diss like the lyrics about Ray J. The lyrics: "I need every bad bitch up in Equinox/I need to know right now if you a freak or not" inspired the editor of Broadly to get Gabby Bess to conduct a survey that involved asking people stood outside Equinox if they're freaks or not.

The track's lyrical content is focused around the newfound fame and fortune that West witnessed in life after being married with Kim Kardashian. Multiple subjects relevant to this are touched on within it, with the rapper leaving barely anything about their lives off the table.

== Release ==
The Life of Pablo was scheduled to be titled Waves at one point and "Highlights" was set to be a part of Act 2 on one of the track lists for the album. When West later shared the album's tracklist via Twitter, the track was handwritten as being titled "High Lights", but when the album was officially released on February 14, 2016, it went under the title of the single word "Highlights". The song was first heard when West performed it Saturday Night Live with Young Thug, El DeBarge, Kelly Price and The-Dream on the very day before The Life of Pablo was released.

Later on in the February that West's album had been released, a demo version of the song with Madonna on the chorus was leaked online from the website Madonnarama. Another demo leaked online in the same month that's more than a minute longer than the officially released version and features extra verses by West, including lyrics about Chloë Sevigny and The Brown Bunny.

== Critical reception ==
"Highlights" received mixed reviews from music critics. The Guardian's Alexis Petridis described the song, along with fellow The Life of Pablo tracks "Low Lights" and "Ultralight Beam", as not feeling "episodic so much as fractured". Young Thug's appearance on the track lead to Rob Sheffield of Rolling Stone putting him forward as being one of the album's high-profile guests that "play the role of Yeezy's sick conscience". Christopher Hooton of The Independent claimed that Thug "was used too sparingly" and also voiced the opinion that "[The] song could comfortably sit on [West's album] Graduation which I don't think is a good thing." The song was branded as appropriately titled by Luke Morgan Britton of NME, since he believed it to be "one of strongest tracks on the record". Greg Tate of SPIN described the track as being where West "[spits] fire over a chord progression inspired by Prince". The song was listed by Philip Cosores of Consequence of Sound as an example of where there's stale lyrics on the album and he branded it as West "talking nonsensically about Ray J". West rapping about Rob and Blac Chyna in the track was cited by Corbin Reiff of The A.V. Club as something that "drives home how quickly the project came together in the end". The Ray J diss was pointed out as a gem on The Life of Pablo by Dee Lockett of The Vulture.

== Controversy ==
In the song, when West raps: "I bet me and Ray J would be been friends/If we ain't love the same bitch/Yeah, he might've hit it first/Only problem is I'm rich", this is clearly a diss directed towards his now ex-wife's ex-boyfriend Ray J. There is an explicit reference dropped to Ray J's infamous 2013 diss track "I Hit It First", which is not the first time West has clapped back at him for the release of this song, since he once dissed Ray J in return on Late Night with Jimmy Fallon when changing the lyrics to his single "Bound 2" in 2013. However, Ray J never responded to being name-dropped in "Highlights", but did give a negative response to the music video for West's song "Famous" from the very same album, which features a nude model of him in it. The controversial lines were listed by NY Daily News as being among The Life of Pablo's 10 most outrageous lyrics.

In Jay-Z's track "Kill Jay Z", which sees him responding to West's rant against him at a concert, Jay references the song along with West's debut studio album The College Dropout (2004).

== Music video ==
On the July 10, 2016 episode of Keeping Up With the Kardashians, West's wife Kim revealed that a music video had been filmed on a glacier only accessible via helicopter in Iceland during a family trip there in April and her sister Kourtney Kardashian revealed during the same episode that it was shot for her favourite The Life of Pablo song, which she had named as "Highlights" at an earlier date. It had been rumoured before this for West to be shooting a video for either the song or fellow album track "Ultralight Beam" when him and The Kardashians had travelled to the country. Pictures of the family trip were shared to Kim's Instagram and prior to the information being revealed that West had shot a music video, he had already released one for fellow album track "Famous".

By the time West marked his first release of material since the album with single "Lift Yourself" in 2018, the video hadn't been released, meaning that it's highly likely to be never slated for release. West had issues with Jay-Z and Tidal in 2017, which included money that West's team claimed he was owed by Tidal for video production and other marketing efforts, which was likely the reason that the music videos for "Highlights" and fellow The Life of Pablo track "Waves" weren't ever released.

== Commercial performance ==
Upon the release of the album, the track debuted at number four on the US Billboard Bubbling Under Hot 100 and remained on the chart for a total of four weeks. Within the same week of its debut on the US Bubbling Under Hot 100, "Highlights" reached number 41 on the US Billboard Hot R&B/Hip-Hop Songs chart. It failed to reach the top hundred of the UK Singles Chart, but came close when charting at number 108 in the United Kingdom upon The Life of Pablo's release.

== Live performances ==
West was accompanied by Young Thug, DeBarge, Price and The-Dream to perform "Highlights" live on Saturday Night Live, where he also performed "Ultralight Beam" and shared the audio of "Low Lights", the very day before the album including all of them was officially released. Immediately after the performance, West made the announcement of The Life of Pablo being released, telling those viewing: "Kanye West dot com right now, Tidal streaming right now." It was also performed by West as part of the Saint Pablo Tour's kickoff show in Indianapolis on August 25, 2016.

== Credits and personnel ==
Credits adapted from West's official website.

- Production – Kanye West & Mike Dean #MWA for Dean's List Productions
- Co-production – Velous & Southside
- Additional production – Plain Pat & Noah Goldstein for Ark Productions, Inc.
- Keyboards – Mike Dean & Greg Phillinganes
- Engineering – Noah Goldstein, Andrew Dawson, Anthony Kilhoffer, Mike Dean, Nathaniel Alford, Mike Malchicoff, Alex Tumay & Dee Brown
- Mix – Manny Marroquin at Larrabee Studios, North Hollywood, CA
- Mix assisted – Chris Galland, Ike Schultz & Jeff Jackson
- Vocals – Young Thug
- Additional vocals – The-Dream, El DeBarge & Kelly Price

== Charts ==
Chart (2016)	Peak position
UK Singles (Official Charts)	108
UK Hip Hop/R&B (Official Charts)	31
US Bubbling Under Hot 100 (Billboard)	4
US Hot R&B/Hip-Hop Songs (Billboard)	41
US On-Demand Streaming Songs (Billboard)	36

== Certifications ==
Region	Certification	Certified units/sales
United States (RIAA)	Gold	500,000^{‡}
^{‡} Sales+streaming figures based on certification alone.
