= Anthony Kilhoffer =

American hip hop record producer, songwriter and engineer

- Born: Anthony Kilhoffer
- Occupations: Record producer; songwriter; record engineer

Anthony Kilhoffer is an American hip hop record producer, songwriter, and engineer, best known for his collaborations with Kanye West, Kid Cudi, Keyshia Cole and John Legend.

== Biography ==
Hailing from Chicago, Illinois, Kilhoffer got his start in the music business as an intern at Trax Records, where he worked with Ministry and other hardcore music acts. He soon moved to Los Angeles to take a job at Record Plant studios, where he began his professional relationship with Kanye West, first acting as an engineer on a series of Floetry recordings, produced by West. This commenced a working relationship with West that extended more than a decade, serving as engineer and/or producer on West's albums The College Dropout (2004), Late Registration (2005), Graduation (2007), 808s and Heartbreak (2008), My Beautiful Dark Twisted Fantasy (2010), Watch The Throne (with Jay-Z, 2011), Cruel Summer (2012), Yeezus (2013), and The Life of Pablo (2016).

Kilhoffer eventually expanded his musical collaborations to include Iggy Azalea (with whom he shared a 2015 Grammy Award nomination for Record of the Year), John Legend, Kid Cudi, Rick Ross, Keisha Cole, Common, The Pussycat Dolls, Rihanna, and Travis Scott, whom Kilhoffer discovered and initially managed upon Scott's 2012 debut.

Kilhoffer's musical output has resulted in four Grammy Award wins and five additional nominations.

== Select discography ==
=== Albums ===
==== 2020s ====
- Man on the Moon III: The Chosen – Kid Cudi
- Free The Beast (album) – B-Free
- La vie en violet – Ateyaba
- Insano – Kid Cudi
- Vultures 1 – ¥$ (Kanye West and Ty Dolla Sign)
- 2093 – Yeat
- Insano (Nitro Mega) – Kid Cudi
- Bad Ass F*cking Kid – Nettspend
- JackBoys 2 – JackBoys & Travis Scott
- Tycoon – Ty Dolla Sign

==== 2010s ====
- Passion, Pain & Demon Slayin' – Kid Cudi
- The Life of Pablo – Kanye West
- Status – Marracash
- Yeezus – Kanye West
- Watch the Throne – Jay-Z & Kanye West
- My Beautiful Dark Twisted Fantasy – Kanye West
- Man on the Moon II: The Legend of Mr. Rager – Kid Cudi
- No Mercy – T.I.
- Teflon Don – Rick Ross
- Speedin' Bullet 2 Heaven – Kid Cudi
- No Dope on Sundays – Cyhi the Prynce

==== 2000s ====
- Straight No Chaser – Mr. Hudson
- For Your Entertainment – Adam Lambert
- Man on the Moon: The End of Day – Kid Cudi
- 808s & Heartbreak – Kanye West
- Just Like You – Keyshia Cole
- Evolver – John Legend
- Thriller (25th Anniversary) – Michael Jackson
- Rising Down – The Roots
- Good Girl Gone Bad – Rihanna
- Graduation – Kanye West
- Como Ama una Mujer – Jennifer Lopez
- Finding Forever – Common
- Once Again – John Legend
- Late Registration – Kanye West
- Get Lifted – John Legend
- PCD – The Pussycat Dolls
- Be – Common
- The College Dropout – Kanye West
- I Changed My Mind – Keyshia Cole
- Elephunk – The Black Eyed Peas

==== 1990s ====
- It's Real – K-Ci & JoJo

== Awards and nominations ==
Award / Organization	Year	Category	Nominated work	Result
Grammy Awards	2005	Grammy Award for Album of the Year	The College Dropout – Kanye West	Nominated
Grammy Awards	2006	Grammy Award for Album of the Year	Late Registration – Kanye West	Nominated
Grammy Awards	2006	Grammy Award for Best Rap Album	Late Registration – Kanye West	Won
Grammy Awards	2006	Grammy Award for Best R&B Album	Get Lifted – John Legend	Won
Grammy Awards	2006	Grammy Award for Record of the Year	”Gold Digger” – Kanye West	Nominated
Grammy Awards	2008	Grammy Award for Album of the Year	Graduation – Kanye West	Nominated
Grammy Awards	2008	Grammy Award for Best Rap Album	Graduation – Kanye West	Won
Grammy Awards	2012	Grammy Award for Best Rap Album	My Beautiful Dark Twisted Fantasy – Kanye West	Won
Grammy Awards	2015	Grammy Award for Record of the Year	”Fancy” – Iggy Azalea	Nominated
