= See You in My Nightmares =

- The planned cover art for the single release

Song by Kanye West featuring Lil Wayne

from the album 808s & Heartbreak
- Released: November 24, 2008
- Recorded: 2008
- Studio: Glenwood (Burbank, California); Avex Recording (Honolulu, Hawaii)
- Genre: Electropop, pop rap
- Length: 4:18
- Label: Roc-A-Fella; Def Jam
- Songwriters: Kanye West; Ernest Dion Wilson; Jeff Bhasker; Dwayne Carter
- Producers: Kanye West; No I.D. (co)

"See You in My Nightmares" is a song by American rapper Kanye West, featuring fellow rapper Lil Wayne, from the former's fourth studio album, 808s & Heartbreak (2008). The song was written by West, No I.D., Jeff Bhasker and Lil Wayne. with production from the former two. It was scheduled to be released as the album's third single on March 10, 2009, ultimately being canceled in favor of "Amazing". A club number with an electronic beat, it relies on strings and synths. Lyrically, West and Lil Wayne discuss relationship troubles.

The song received mixed reviews from music critics, who were generally split in their feelings of Lil Wayne's appearance. Critical commentary was mostly focused on the rapper's vocal style, while a few reviewers were negative towards his lyricism. In 2008, "See You in My Nightmares" charted at number 21 on the US Billboard Hot 100 and number 27 on the US Pop 100, alongside reaching number 22 on the Canadian Hot 100. The song has since been certified gold in the United States by the Recording Industry Association of America (RIAA). West performed it in February 2009 for his second live album, VH1 Storytellers (2010). In the former year, a remix of the song was used for Spike Jonze's film We Were Once a Fairytale, which stars a drunken West in a club. The song was later covered by Vida Sophia in December 2015.

== Background and recording ==
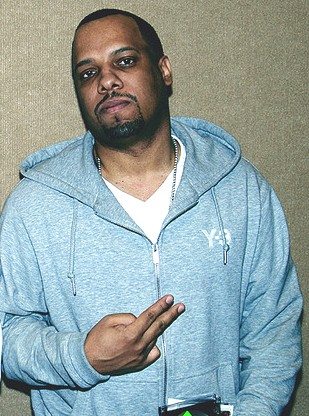
No I.D. served as a co-writer and co-producer for the song.

In July 2007, Lil Wayne brought out West during his first show at the Beacon Theatre in New York City. West released his third studio album Graduation two months later, which features a guest appearance from Lil Wayne on "Barry Bonds"; this marked the first collaboration between the two. In the lyrics of fellow album track "The Glory", West makes a reference to him. Lil Wayne released a remix of his hit single "Lollipop" in May 2008, featuring West. The former released his sixth studio album Tha Carter III the following month, and West contributed production to its tracks "Comfortable" and "Let the Beat Build". On both of the tracks, Lil Wayne shouts out West. He also makes a reference to West on the track "Dr. Carter". Prior to "See You in My Nightmares", West and Lil Wayne had both frequently used Auto-Tune.

After Kanye's mother Donda West died, his mentor No I.D. was contacted by American rapper Malik Yusef, who told him to spend time with the artist. No I.D. initially rejected the decision due to their differing personalities, but later started to communicate with Kanye West more after persuasion from Malik Yusef. West and No I.D. then travelled to Hawaii to work with rapper Jay-Z on his eleventh studio album The Blueprint 3 (2009), before West decided on transferring to working on 808s & Heartbreak in the state. The recording took place at Avex Recording Studio in Honolulu, Hawaii, and at Glenwood Studios in Burbank, California. The song was produced by West, while co-produced by No I.D. The producers wrote the song alongside Jeff Bhasker and Lil Wayne. It experienced a leak on November 12, 2008, being reported to have the title of "Tell Everybody That You Know" at the time. Manny Marroquin served the role of mix engineer for "See You in My Nightmares", with engineering assistance from Christian Plata and Erik Madrid, and an 11-piece orchestra was also used for the song that was conducted by Larry Gold. (Note: See credits and personnel for the roles of the entire orchestra.) "See You in My Nightmares" was recorded during the three week period that West worked on the entirety of the album in 2008. Reflecting on the album for its 10th anniversary in 2018, recording engineer Anthony Kilhoffer recalled the heavy amount of effort that was put into the song's production. He elaborated, specifying that it was tweaked across different studios in a perfectionist manner while West was in Asia and Europe on the Glow in the Dark Tour (2007–2008).

== Composition and lyrics ==
Musically, "See You in My Nightmares" is a pop number, with an electronic beat. Going against the composition of the other tracks on 808s & Heartbreak, no drum sounds are featured. The song is reliant on strings and electric synths, the former of which were arranged by Gold. The strings were engineered by Jeff Chestek, with assistance from Rick Friedrich, Montez Roberts, and John Stahl. In the background, the song features a cello, violas, bass, and violins. Keyboards are also included in the composition, which were contributed by Bhasker. Throughout the song, West's voice is Auto-Tuned as he sings in an aggressive tone. Lil Wayne raps in Auto-Tune, with him contributing the hook and a verse.

In the lyrics of the song, West and Lil Wayne touch on relationship troubles with their ex-lovers. On the hook, the latter raps about a break-up: "I got the right to put up a fight/ But not quite cause you cut off my light/ But my sight is better tonight/ And I might see you in my nightmare." West dismisses his ex-lover during his performance, asserting that he has rid his mind of her. At the start of Lil Wayne's verse, he shouts "Baby girl, I'm finished" in his signature snarl.

== Release and reception ==
West's fourth studio album 808s & Heartbreak was released on November 24, 2008, including "See You in My Nightmares" as the tenth track. The song had been set for release to US rhythmic crossover and top 40 radio stations as the album's third single on March 10, 2009. Instead, "Amazing" was sent to US radio stations as the third single on the scheduled date. However, "See You in My Nightmares" received airplay during March 2009.

The song was met with mixed reviews from music critics, with them mostly being ambivalent about Lil Wayne's feature. Adam Conner-Simons from musicOMH stated that "See You in My Nightmares" demonstrates where the album "crystallises a distinct musical moment", giving the song the title of a "mesmering" duet between West and the rapper. Conner-Simons further commented that due to "two of the rap game's most respected MCs dropping the macho facade", utilizing Auto-Tune and putting out "a passionate club-banger about relationship troubles", West "is effectively ushering in a bizarre new emo-rap subgenre". Writing for PopMatters, Dave Heaton remarked that West's choice to guest Lil Wayne on the song was smart, appreciating his "tough" voice as a perfect fit for "the milieu". In his Consumer Guide MSN Music column, Robert Christgau observed that even though the quality of the songs deters in the second half of 808s & Heartbreak, "they come rushing back with the Lil Wayne ditty". The Los Angeles Times contributor Ann Powers opined that Lil Wayne's feature is "all swagger, no tears". USA Today's Steve Jones recommended the song as one of the tracks to download from the album.

Expressing a divided opinion of "See You in My Nightmares" in No Ripcord, Cara Nash analyzed that while the song "may prove more commercially viable" with Lil Wayne's appearance, his "thug like vocals" are disruptive of the album's "introspective flow". Brandon Perkins from Urb admitted that despite the addition of Lil Wayne's "supersized ego", the song turns out to be "surprisingly flat and forgettable", believing certain lyrics from the rapper stick out for their "cringe-worthy absurdity". In a negative review for Spin, Charles Aaron characterized the song as a "disjointed oddity" that Lil Wayne raps foolish lyrics on in his typical Auto-Tuned style. Aaron continued, affirming that the combination of his rapping and "chintzy synth-strings sweep[ing] by" makes it "time to scan for an exit" from the album. James Reed of The Boston Globe complained about Lil Wayne's talent being "squandered on 'See You in My Nightmares'". Offering a similar viewpoint, Slant Magazine's Wilson McBee said the rapper's feature is representative of "the worst of his recent Auto-Tuned, soft-rock indulgences". Reviewing 808s & Heartbreak for Pitchfork, Scott Plagenhoef selected the song as one of its low points.

== Commercial performance ==
Upon the release of 808s & Heartbreak, "See You in My Nightmares" debuted and peaked at number 21 on the US Billboard Hot 100, standing as the week's highest entry. The song spent four weeks on the Hot 100 in total. In the same week as its debut on the chart, the song entered the US Billboard Pop 100 at number 27, becoming the highest entry on another chart for the United States. "See You in My Nightmares" was later certified gold by the Recording Industry Association of America (RIAA) for amassing 500,000 certified units in the US on September 23, 2020.

Elsewhere, the song entered two charts following the album's release. It opened at number 22 on the Canadian Hot 100, standing as the highest entry of the week. The song lasted for one week on the chart. In the United Kingdom, the song reached number 111 on the UK Singles Chart.

== Live performances ==
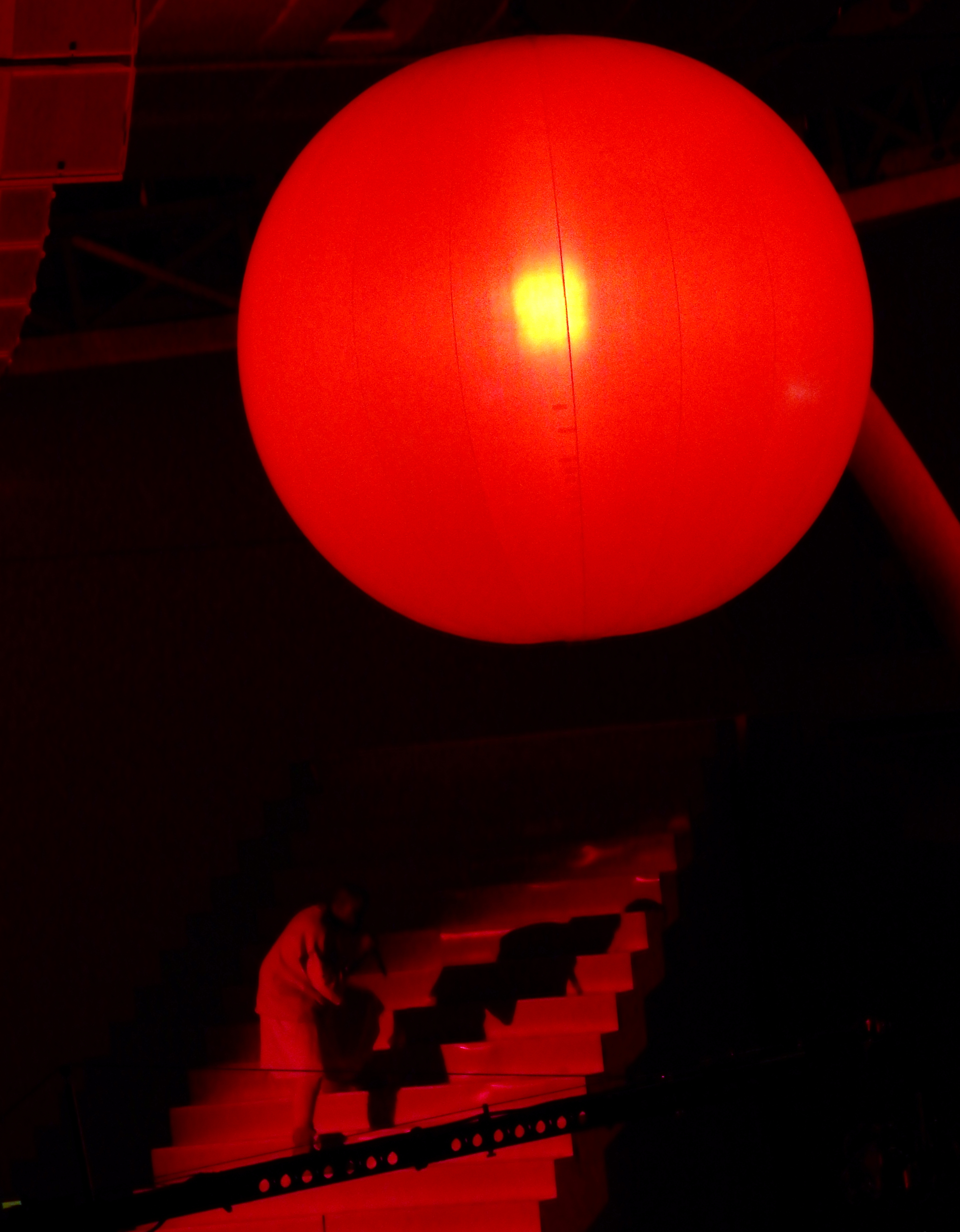
West performing the song at the 2015 Hollywood Bowl as a bright blood red color covers the lightless stage.

In February 2009, West delivered a performance of the song as the opening number for his second live album VH1 Storytellers (2010). Prior to performing, West expressed disappointment in how most hip hop artists do not grow musically, differing from him. He segued from the performance into one of fellow 808s & Heartbreak track "RoboCop". West delivered a performance of the former for his headlining set at the 2009 Wireless Festival in Hyde Park, London, during which he rocked his customary aviator shades and black suit jacket. He was on a raised section of the stage for the performance, being surrounded by four topless dancers that wore tiaras and body paint.

For West's two night concert of 808s & Heartbreak in full at the Hollywood Bowl in September 2015, he performed "See You in My Nightmares" solo as the set's 10th track. This stood as West's first performance of the track since July 2009, and he wore loose garments in white and off-white shades while performing. West was backed by a small band and a medium-sized orchestra, while the lights were off and the stage was covered in a bright blood red color. In the middle of the track, West requested to be accompanied by a piano after shouting: "Stop the track ... stop the track." He approached his band for a comment, before walking over to his string section to turn a page on the conductor's sheet music. West acknowledged the issues, jokingly characterizing the show as a dress rehearsal.

== Appearances in media ==
American filmmaker Spike Jonze had talks in private with West about reuniting with him on a music video for "See You in My Nightmares" in February 2009, after they had previously collaborated on the video for the latter's "Flashing Lights" in 2007. During the week of March 23, 2009, news began to circulate publicly that West and Spike Jonze were working together on the former's music video. The following week, the latter's production partner Vincent Landay told MTV News that he and West had "teamed up again, but this time, it's for a short film". Landay continued, clarifying that the film was shot for fun and is "not necessarily [a video for 'Nightmares'], but the song is featured in it", while revealing that editing was ongoing at the time. West and Spike Jonze themselves had agreed on expanding the video into the short film We Were Once a Fairytale, which was directed by the latter and premiered at the 2009 Los Angeles Film Festival on June 24. The film takes its title from the song's lyrics, though does not star Lil Wayne. During a scene of the film that features a remix of "See You in My Nightmares" playing in the background through the speakers in a club, West portrays a drunken version of his public persona as he stumbles around. West becomes aggressive and desperate while his disruptive antics gather stares from surprised attendees, before he gropes some of them and shouts: "Do you like my song? This is my song!"

West collaborator "The World Famous" Tony Williams released his single "Nightmares" on February 24, 2010, which is a rendition of "See You in My Nightmares" that features Cello Tha Black Pearl and Tada. The rendition was shared by West on his blog. On December 14, 2015, Vida Sophia of Danish dream pop project Bye Barat posted her cover version of the song to SoundCloud. The cover's production has psychedelic elements and heavily features reverberation, while Vida Sophia sings in a soft, calm voice.

== Credits and personnel ==
Information taken from 808s & Heartbreak liner notes.

Recording

- Recorded at Glenwood Studios (Burbank, California) and Avex Recording Studio (Honolulu, Hawaii)

Personnel

- Kanye West – songwriter, producer
- No I.D. – songwriter, co-producer
- Jeff Bhasker – songwriter, keyboards
- Dwayne Carter – songwriter
- Andrew Dawson – recorder
- Anthony Kilhoffer – recorder
- Chad Carlisle – assistant recorder
- Isha Erskine – assistant recorder
- Gaylord Holomalia – assistant recorder
- Christian Mochizuki – assistant recorder
- Manny Marroquin – mix engineer
- Christian Plata – assistant engineer
- Erik Madrid – assistant engineer
- Jeff Chestek – string engineer
- Rick Friedrich – assistant string engineer
- Montez Roberts – assistant string engineer
- John Stahl – assistant string engineer

Additional musicians

- Larry Gold – string arrangement and conducting
- Olga Konopelsky – violin
- Emma Kummrow – violin
- Luigi Mazzochi – violin
- Charles Parker – violin
- Igor Szwec – violin
- Gregory Teperman – violin
- Davis Barnett – viola
- Alexandra Leem – viola
- James J. Cooper, III – cello
- Jennie Lorenzo – cello
- Miles Davis – bass

== Charts ==
Chart performance for "See You in My Nightmares"
Chart (2008)	Peak position
Canada Hot 100 (Billboard)	22
UK Singles (OCC)	111
US Billboard Hot 100	21
US Pop 100 (Billboard)	27

== Certifications ==
Certifications for "See You in My Nightmares"
Region	Certification	Certified units/sales
United States (RIAA)	Gold	500,000^{‡}
^{‡} Sales+streaming figures based on certification alone.
