= We Were Once a Fairytale =

2009 American drama short film by Spike Jonze

- Directed by: Spike Jonze
- Written by: Spike Jonze
- Produced by: Vincent Landay
- Starring: Kanye West
- Cinematography: Wyatt Troll
- Edited by: Stephen Berger; Michael Dart Wadsworth
- Music by: Kanye West
- Release date: June 24, 2009 (Los Angeles Film Festival)
- Running time: 14 minutes
- Country: United States
- Language: English

We Were Once a Fairytale is a 2009 drama short film directed by Spike Jonze and starring rapper Kanye West. It is the second collaboration between Jonze and West, who jointly co-directed the music video for West's single "Flashing Lights" in 2008.

== Synopsis ==
Kanye West plays himself drunk at a nightclub embarrassing himself and his friends while being belligerent. West becomes excited when "See You in My Nightmares" starts playing in the club and he begins to wander around the club reminding everyone that it is his song, even though everyone already knows that. He also tries to flirt with many of the women there, who are at first starstruck, but then quickly repulsed by his drunken behavior and lewd advances. West embarrasses himself further when he tries to hit on a woman who is there with her boyfriend. He later runs into Fonzworth Bentley, who he has a brief conversation with until another drunk man comes up to West and mistakes him for Lil Wayne. After Bentley corrects the man, the man continues interrupting the conversation while attempting to talk to West until Bentley grabs the man and a fight breaks out. West simply walks away.

On the dance floor, West tries to dance but ends up leaning on a stranger, barely conscious. He then wanders into an empty side room where he begins to feel depressed, but a beautiful woman in a leopard print dress appears. She comforts him and tells him "It's OK" while he cries on her shoulder. They begin to have sex on a sofa but he passes out on top of her. When West wakes up a short time later, he finds himself with his pants down, lying on a sofa covered with leopard print pillows — he was hallucinating.

Startled and nauseated, he rushes to the bathroom and vomits what appear to be rose petals. West finds a bowie knife in the bathroom and cuts into his stomach, spilling a torrent of petals from his stomach. He pushes the knife in deeper and, with his hands, digs out of himself a small rodent-like creature, named in the credits as "Henry". When Kanye realizes it is connected to him by an umbilical cord, he cuts the cord with the knife. He then places the creature on a sink counter in front of him and hands it a miniature version of the bowie knife. The creature grabs the tiny knife and eyes it apprehensively before shaking its head at West, who slowly nods his head in response. West watches as the creature commits suicide, falls over, and slowly dies while gasping for air. The film cuts to black with West still looking at its corpse lying on the counter.

== Production ==
The plot is based on an idea developed by Jonze, who then approached West whom Jonze thought would be great for the role. Jonze and West spoke about working together on a music video for West's song "See You in My Nightmares" from his fourth studio album 808s & Heartbreak. They later agreed that the new video should be expanded into an experimental film. Jonze said the film was meant to illustrate the themes of loss and isolation on 808s & Heartbreak.

The short film was shot near the end of January 2009 within two days in the Foxtail nightclub in West Hollywood, California. Fonzworth Bentley, Mike Carroll, and members of the GIRL skateboard team make cameos as West's friends and other guests at the nightclub. The soundtrack to the short prominently features West's "See You in My Nightmares", "When I Said Goodbye" by Mayer Hawthorne, and Beethoven's Moonlight Sonata, which plays over the final moments of the film.

== Release ==
The film premiered at the Los Angeles Film Festival on June 24, 2009, was intended for public release through the iTunes Store on September 8, 2009, but did not premiere online until October 18, 2009, through West's blog. On October 18, We Were Once a Fairytale was leaked to the Internet and posted on West's official website, kanyeuniversecity.com. Jonze said the film was accidentally leaked from the post-production studio of a friend, and that West did not realize that it was not meant to be circulated yet. "I think he was like: 'Oh, it's out. I'll link to it,'" Jonze said. On October 19, the video was removed from the West's blog, with only a message left from West saying "SORRY I HAD TO TAKE IT DOWN : (". The video, however, can still be found on various video sharing websites and is now available through iTunes.
