= Saint Pablo Tour =

2016 concert tour by Kanye West

- North American tour by Kanye West
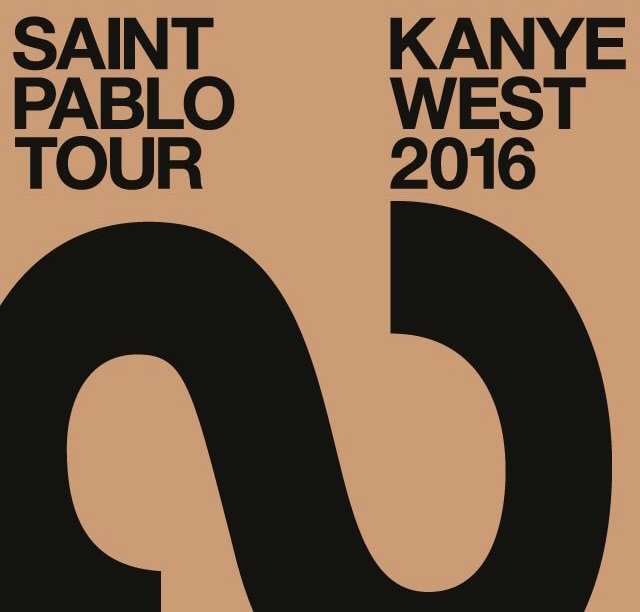
- Associated album: The Life of Pablo
- Start date: August 25, 2016
- End date: November 19, 2016
- Legs: 1
- No. of shows: 41
- Box office: $52.8 million

Kanye West concert chronology
- The Yeezus Tour (2013–14); Saint Pablo Tour (2016); Ye Live Concert Tour (2026–27)

The Saint Pablo Tour was the sixth concert tour by American rapper Kanye West which ran from August 25, 2016 to November 19, 2016 in support of West's seventh solo studio album, The Life of Pablo (2016). The tour was originally planned to run until December 31, 2016, but was canceled prematurely on November 21, 2016 due to West's hospitalization. It was the 18th highest-grossing tour of 2016 in North America. The shows played at The Forum in Inglewood, California were the most lucrative.

== History ==
=== Design ===
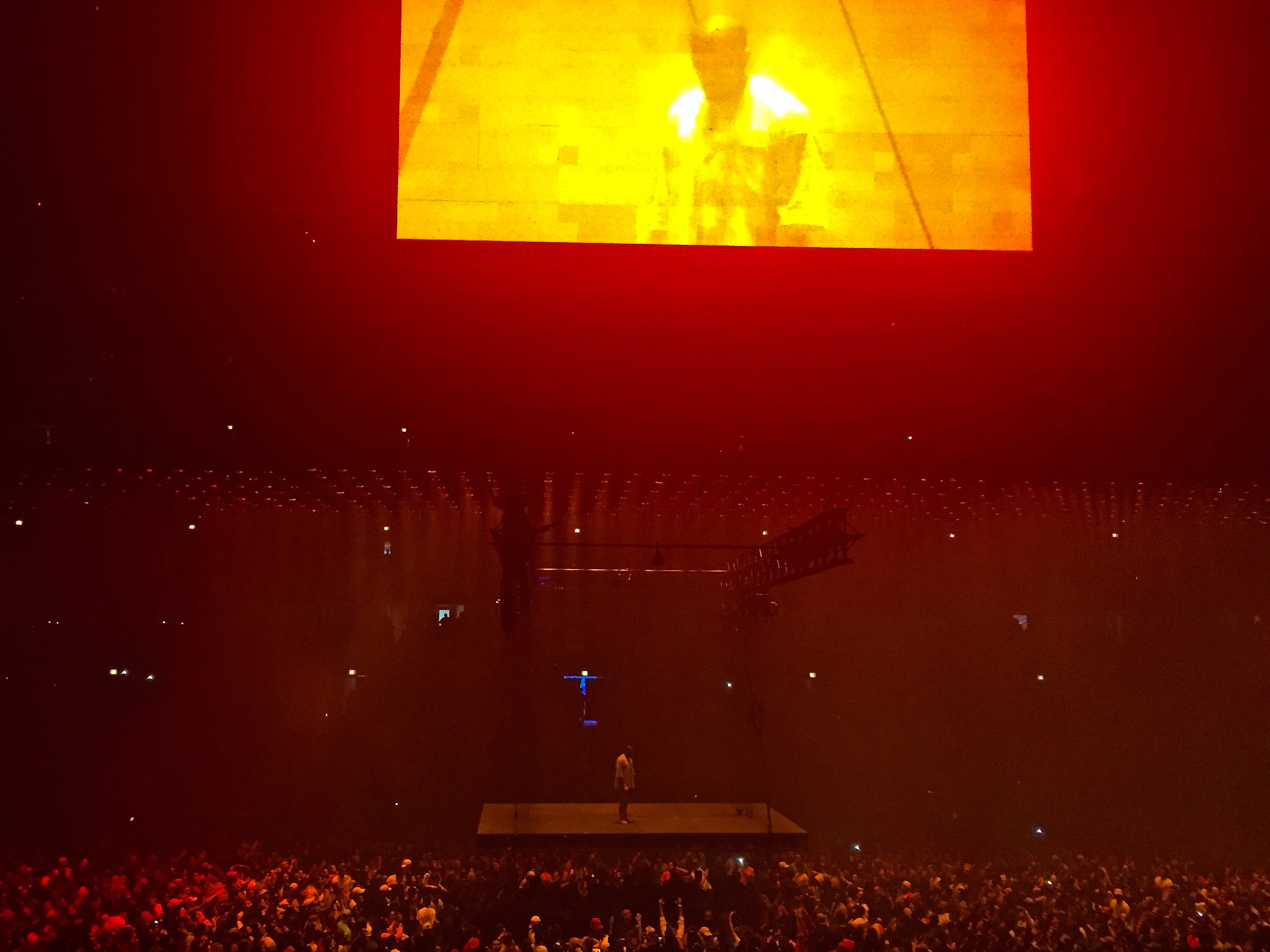
West seen on the "floating" main stage with the secondary stage shining down above him.

The design of Saint Pablo Tour featured a "first-of-its-kind floating stage" which was composed of a main stage and an auxiliary stage that had an intricate system of pulleys and tracks designed to be connected to the frame of each arena. The floating main stage had lights on the edge as well as on the bottom portion, which would occasionally shine on the audience. The second stage was composed of four rectangular portions which would move and provided ambient light for each song. The stages could then be manipulated to the needs of the tour, incorporating the audience into the experience at each concert as visitors would be able to engage with Kanye West. Each show had three sections separated by two intermissions, with uses of light increasing as the performance progresses. Some of the portions appeared to be influenced by various themes in popular culture, such as the show's intermissions which were similar to Close Encounters of the Third Kind by Steven Spielberg.

=== Tour ===
West began the Saint Pablo Tour in Indianapolis, Indiana on August 25, 2016, introducing his new stage design to the public, impressing the attending audience. On October 2, 2016, West cut his performance short at Citi Field in New York City following news of his wife Kim Kardashian being robbed at gunpoint in Paris. Two tour dates were also cancelled the following week.

Kanye's returning concert following Kim Kardashian's incident was performed in his hometown of Chicago at the United Center on October 7, 2016, where he arrived on stage an hour and a half past schedule and "made no mention of his wife or the incident, in a show in which he barely spoke to the crowd at all". In San Jose, California during his November 17 performance, West spoke about American politics and stated "If I would have voted, I would have voted for Trump", with some fans booing and throwing items on stage. In Sacramento on November 19, 2016, West performed three songs before he diverted the performance and spoke about Facebook, Jay Z, Hillary Clinton, Beyoncé, and then proceeded to walk off stage, later cancelling further dates of the tour due to stress and exhaustion while ticketholders were given a refund.

Following the cancellation, West’s company Very Good Touring sued insurers at Lloyd's of London for nearly $10 million in insurance payments. The parties resolved the dispute in February 2018, and a federal judge dismissed the lawsuit at their request. Settlement terms were not disclosed.

== Set list ==
This set list is an example of one typically performed from the Boston show onwards. Songs included in the five prior shows' setlists not included further include "FML," "Amazing," "Devil in a New Dress (Note: Only performed at the shows in Indianapolis and Buffalo.)," "30 Hours," "Gold Digger" and "All Falls Down."

1. ''Father Stretch My Hands Pt. 1"
2. "Pt. 2"
3. "Famous"
4. "Pop Style"
5. "That Part"
6. "Facts"
7. "Mercy"
8. "Don't Like.1"
9. "All Day"
10. "Black Skinhead"
11. "Niggas in Paris"
12. "Can't Tell Me Nothing"
13. "Power"
14. "Blood on the Leaves"
15. "Freestyle 4"
16. "Jesus Walks"
17. "Flashing Lights"
18. "Highlights"
19. "Feedback"
20. "Wolves"
21. "Heartless"
22. "Runaway"
23. "Only One"
24. "I Love Kanye"
25. "Waves"
26. "All of the Lights"
27. "Good Life"
28. "Stronger"
29. "Touch the Sky"
30. "Fade"
31. "Ultralight Beam"

== Tour dates ==
=== Dates performed ===
Date	City	Country	Venue	Attendance	Box office
North America
August 25, 2016	Indianapolis	United States	Bankers Life Fieldhouse	—N/a	—N/a
August 27, 2016	Buffalo	United States	First Niagara Center	11,678/ 11,678	$844,143
August 30, 2016	Toronto	Canada	Air Canada Centre	26,716 / 26,716	$2,439,870
August 31, 2016	Toronto	Canada	Air Canada Centre	26,716 / 26,716	$2,439,870
September 2, 2016	Montreal	Canada	Bell Centre	—N/a	—N/a
September 3, 2016	Boston	United States	TD Garden	16,182 / 16,495	$1,512,328
September 5, 2016	New York City	United States	Madison Square Garden	37,005 / 37,005	$4,852,888
September 6, 2016	New York City	United States	Madison Square Garden	37,005 / 37,005	$4,852,888
September 8, 2016	Washington, D.C.	United States	Verizon Center	16,838 / 16,838	$1,786,000
September 12, 2016	Atlanta	United States	Philips Arena	16,011 / 16,011	$1,358,087
September 14, 2016	Tampa	United States	Amalie Arena	14,027 / 14,027	$1,066,669
September 16, 2016	Miami	United States	American Airlines Arena	37,820 / 37,820	$3,150,183
September 17, 2016	Miami	United States	American Airlines Arena	37,820 / 37,820	$3,150,183
September 20, 2016	Houston	United States	Toyota Center	14,883 / 14,883	$1,389,472
September 21, 2016	Austin	United States	Frank Erwin Center	13,247 / 13,247	$1,243,591
September 22, 2016	Dallas	United States	American Airlines Center	16,999 / 21,192	$1,444,680
September 24, 2016	Nashville	United States	Bridgestone Arena	18,211 / 18,211	$1,070,994
September 25, 2016	Columbus	United States	Value City Arena	14,970 / 18,384	$972,855
September 27, 2016	Grand Rapids	United States	Van Andel Arena	—N/a	—N/a
September 28, 2016	Detroit	United States	Joe Louis Arena	—N/a	—N/a
September 30, 2016	University Park, PA	United States	Bryce Jordan Center	—N/a	—N/a
October 1, 2016	Cleveland	United States	Quicken Loans Arena	—N/a	—N/a
October 2, 2016 (Note: The October 2, 2016 concert in New York City is part of The Meadows Music and Arts Festival; West stopped the show short due to a family emergency.)	New York City	United States	Citi Field	—N/a	—N/a
October 7, 2016	Chicago	United States	United Center	—N/a	—N/a
October 8, 2016	Rosemont, IL	United States	Allstate Arena	—N/a	—N/a
October 10, 2016	Saint Paul, MN	United States	Xcel Energy Center	—N/a	—N/a
October 12, 2016	Winnipeg	Canada	MTS Centre	—N/a	—N/a
October 15, 2016	Edmonton	Canada	Rogers Place	—N/a	—N/a
October 17, 2016	Vancouver	Canada	Rogers Arena	—N/a	—N/a
October 19, 2016	Seattle	United States	KeyArena	—N/a	—N/a
October 22, 2016	Oakland	United States	Oracle Arena	—N/a	—N/a
October 23, 2016	Oakland	United States	Oracle Arena	—N/a	—N/a
October 25, 2016	Inglewood, CA	United States	The Forum	97,360 / 97,360	$8,292,767 (Note: The score data is combined from the shows held at The Forum from 25, 26, 27 October & 1, 2, 3 November 2016 respectively.)
October 26, 2016	Inglewood, CA	United States	The Forum	97,360 / 97,360	$8,292,767
October 27, 2016	Inglewood, CA	United States	The Forum	97,360 / 97,360	$8,292,767
October 29, 2016	Las Vegas	United States	T-Mobile Arena	18,100 / 18,100	$2,107,440
November 1, 2016	Inglewood	United States	The Forum		
November 2, 2016	Inglewood	United States	The Forum		
November 3, 2016 (Note: West abruptly stopped the show 45 minutes into the set after complaining of hoarseness in his voice and being unable to continue. He had promised those in attendance a full refund as a result.)	Inglewood	United States	The Forum		
November 17, 2016 (Note: West declares on-stage that "if I were to vote, I would have voted on Trump," earning boos from the audience.)	San Jose	United States	SAP Center	—N/a	—N/a
November 19, 2016 (Note: At the November 19 show in Sacramento, West arrived an hour and a half late after the show's start time, performed 3 songs, delivered a 17 minute diatribe, then walked off the stage. Golden 1 Center later gave refunds to everyone that attended the show.)	Sacramento	United States	Golden 1 Center	—N/a	—N/a
TOTAL				352,769 / 361,129 (97%)	$31,745,967

=== Cancelled dates ===
List of cancelled concerts, showing date, city, country, venue and reason for cancellation
Date	City	Country	Venue	Reason
October 4, 2016	Philadelphia	United States	Wells Fargo Center	Rescheduled due to a family emergency; the new dates were later cancelled with remainder of tour
October 6, 2016	Auburn Hills, MI	United States	The Palace of Auburn Hills	Rescheduled due to a family emergency; the new dates were later cancelled with remainder of tour
November 20, 2016	Inglewood, CA	United States	The Forum	Stress and exhaustion
November 22, 2016	Fresno	United States	Save Mart Center	Stress and exhaustion
November 23, 2016	Anaheim	United States	Honda Center	Stress and exhaustion
November 26, 2016	Dallas	United States	American Airlines Center	Stress and exhaustion
November 28, 2016	Denver	United States	Pepsi Center	Stress and exhaustion
December 1, 2016	San Antonio	United States	AT&T Center	Stress and exhaustion
December 2, 2016	Houston	United States	Toyota Center	Stress and exhaustion
December 4, 2016	Sunrise, FL	United States	BB&T Center	Stress and exhaustion
December 6, 2016	Orlando	United States	Amway Center	Stress and exhaustion
December 8, 2016	Atlanta	United States	Philips Arena	Stress and exhaustion
December 9, 2016	Columbia, SC	United States	Colonial Life Arena	Stress and exhaustion
December 11, 2016	Albany	United States	Times Union Center	Stress and exhaustion
December 13, 2016 (Note: Was originally to be held on October 4, 2016 but was postponed due to a family emergency.)	Philadelphia	United States	Wells Fargo Center	Stress and exhaustion
December 15, 2016	Philadelphia	United States	Wells Fargo Center	Stress and exhaustion
December 16, 2016	Newark	United States	Prudential Center	Stress and exhaustion
December 18, 2016	Toronto	Canada	Air Canada Centre	Stress and exhaustion
December 20, 2016	Louisville	United States	KFC Yum! Center	Stress and exhaustion
December 22, 2016 (Note: Was originally to be held on October 6, 2016 but was postponed due to family emergency.)	Auburn Hills, MI	United States	The Palace of Auburn Hills	Stress and exhaustion
December 27, 2016	Washington, D.C.	United States	Verizon Center	Stress and exhaustion
December 28, 2016	Boston	United States	TD Garden	Stress and exhaustion
December 30, 2016	Brooklyn	United States	Barclays Center	Stress and exhaustion
December 31, 2016	Brooklyn	United States	Barclays Center	Stress and exhaustion

== Reception ==
The architectural website ArchDaily stated:

There are few artists, if any, who do as much for the sake of art as Kanye West. ... Kanye West has transformed Stage Design and Performance Architecture, with each live performance now redefining the way we envision and experience the medium, much in the same way his idols, Steve Jobs and Walt Disney, transformed their respective fields. The Yeezus Tour was a feat in terms of design and production, but the Saint Pablo Tour is a feat in terms of engineering—and few artists can say they’ve created a transcendent experience that goes beyond what is expected of a “concert.”
