= VH1 Storytellers (Kanye West album) =

Live album by Kanye West
- Released: January 5, 2010
- Recorded: February 13, 2009
- Venue: Sony Stages (Los Angeles)
- Genre: Hip-hop
- Length: 64:34
- Labels: Roc-A-Fella; Def Jam
- Producer: Kanye West

Kanye West chronology
808s & Heartbreak (2008)	VH1 Storytellers (2010)	My Beautiful Dark Twisted Fantasy (2010)

VH1 Storytellers is the second live album by the American rapper Kanye West. It was released in CD and DVD formats on January 5, 2010, through Roc-A-Fella Records and Def Jam Recordings. After West announced an appearance for the program of the same name, he performed the set at Los Angeles' Sony Stages on February 13, 2009. The performance premiered via VH1 on February 28, with parts of West's stories cut out due to time constraints.

Nine tracks were featured on VH1 Storytellers and West's performances of three tracks were added as bonus clips on its DVD, alongside his question-and-answer session. West mostly performed tracks from his previous two albums, Graduation (2007) and 808s & Heartbreak (2008). He freestyled about the stories of the tracks, referencing subjects like musical influences, American society, and the media. The album received generally positive reviews from music critics, who often praised West's performances. Reception of West's speeches was more divided around the depth of his stories, although a few reviewers commended the honesty.

== Background and release ==
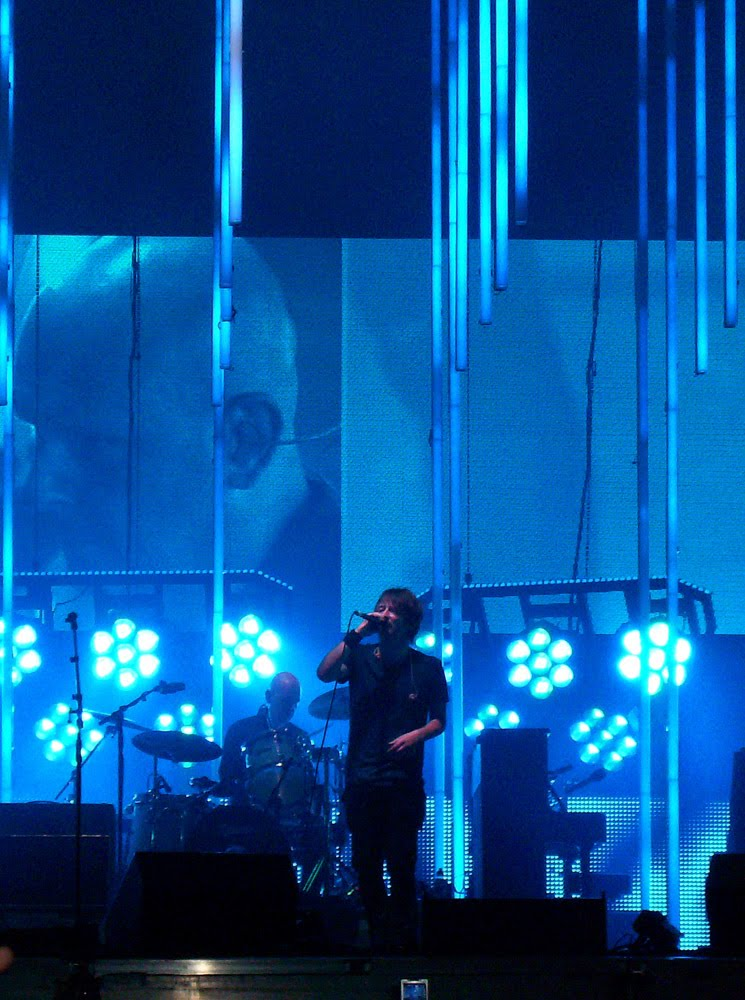
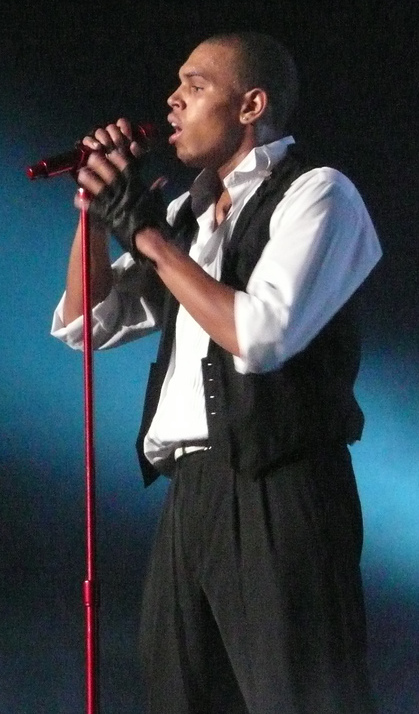
West made mentions of Thom Yorke (left) and Chris Brown (right) during the taping at Sony Stages, although these were cut out because of time constraints.

On February 3, 2009, West announced that he would film an episode in Los Angeles for the VH1 Storytellers program on February 13. This followed his mentor Jay-Z having appeared for the program a year and a half prior, and West gave away around 80 tickets to his fans through a contest on his website. Stage design was done for West's episode by Es Devlin, while lighting design was handled by Martin Phillips and John McGuire. The episode was taped at Los Angeles' Sony Stages on the scheduled date and lasted for three hours, although it was cut to 90 minutes for the premiere via VH1 on February 28, 2009. In an interview with Reuters, executive producer Bill Flanagan said that some of West's stories were cut down due to time constraints and he "tried to get the essence of his comments". West insulted English band Radiohead in the taping for lead singer Thom Yorke's alleged snobbery of him backstage at the 51st Annual Grammy Awards, taking offence as he saw the band as an inspiration. He also asked the audience to give Chris Brown "a break" after the singer's assault on Rihanna, although there was a lack of detail available regarding the incident at the time.

West delivered 14 performances for the album and 9 made the final track listing, with performances of "Street Lights", "Paranoid", and "Homecoming" included as bonus clips. His performance of "Go Hard" was cut out, while one of "Love Lockdown" was only made available online. VH1 Storytellers was released as a CD and DVD package by West's labels Roc-A-Fella and Def Jam on January 5, 2010. The DVD lasted for over 70 minutes, adding his question-and-answer session and previously unaired performances.

== Synopsis and music ==
VH1 Storytellers is a hip-hop live album. For the show, West wore a bowtie, shades, and a suit. The rapper delivered an intimate gig, appearing in a cosy setting at points. He was backed by the theatrics of an elaborate light show, featuring visual projections on the background screen and illumination from a floating square overhead. The screen occasionally shoots red beams down near West, who appears on a bare stage. A backing band supported him that included violinists wearing goalie masks, drummers, and a backing vocalist with "imposing" shoulder pads. Sparse arrangements were delivered by the live orchestration that continued for four minutes after each piece, while West often sang through Auto-Tune. West performed songs from his studio albums Graduation (2007) and 808s & Heartbreak (2008), with "Touch the Sky" from 2005's Late Registration marking the only track of his first two albums. The rapper offered the stories behind the songs after performing as he freestyled about subjects such as musical influences, American society, and the media. He also focused on himself as he discussed his career, fame, and art. During the question-and-answer session, West explained the difference between 808s & Heartbreak and his 2004 debut The College Dropout.

West started his set with a performance of "See You in My Nightmares", preceded by lamenting that other hip-hop artists do not evolve musically like him. He segued from the song into "RoboCop" and recited the stanza "You spoiled little L.A. girl / You're just an L.A. girl" at the end, mentioning Tenacious D as an influence. West then performed "Flashing Lights" and apologized to VH1 for not revealing personal information in the stories; he alluded to his mother's death. His performance of "Amazing" relied on a piano figure and he complained about media coverage in the middle of the song, apologizing for his behaviour at award shows. West identified Michael Jackson and swimmer Michael Phelps as amazing, as well as O. J. Simpson, an actor who was known for his murder trial. The rapper performed "Touch the Sky" to stripped-down instrumentation, declaring he feels pain in not being able to watch himself perform live and that he is used as a vessel by God. For West's performance of "Say You Will", spooky keyboards were added to the somber sound and he then performed "Good Life". West followed with a medley of "Heartless and "Pinocchio Story", pretending to look for his heart on the floor and calling out fellow rapper 50 Cent as he sang. He closed the set with a stripped-down performance of "Stronger", which largely omitted its Daft Punk sample.

== Critical reception ==
Professional ratings
Aggregate scores
Source	Rating
Metacritic	66/100
Review scores
Source	Rating
AllMusic	3/5 stars
The A.V. Club	C
Cokemachineglow	4/10
Consequence	C+
Entertainment Weekly	A
Pitchfork	4.9/10
PopMatters	8/10

According to the review aggregator Metacritic, VH1 Storytellers received "generally favorable reviews" based on a weighted average score of 66 out of 100 from 6 critic scores. In a highly positive review, Leah Greenblatt from Entertainment Weekly found West to be someone who is rarely boring and wrote that rather than telling stories, he lets out "his id onto the stage in rambling, free-form fragments". Greenblatt continued, describing West's songs and speeches as being delivered in "a sort of messy, testifying fervor". Writing for PopMatters, Ross Langager was often excited by West's performances on the album and opined that the key element is his "idiosyncratic take on the vaunted 'storytelling' portion of the show", with him also showing self-awareness.

Andy Kellman was less enthusiastic in AllMusic, feeling West uses the speech to go from "laying his soul bare [to] acting like an egomaniac", though Kellman concluded by calling VH1 Storytellers "a nice addition to a hardcore supporter's collection". In a mixed review, Nathan Rabin of The A.V. Club found that West's "unusually dour" presentation "undermines the back-porch, intimate, telling-stories-to-pals vibe of Storytellers". Rabin expressed the viewpoint of the stories being rambled to incompletion and ultimately dull, while he praised West for sounding "tight, accomplished, and polished to a blinding sheen" at certain points. Similarly, Scott Plagenhoef from Pitchfork observed "less storytelling and more golden age of entertainment-type stuff" from West, feeling that he "should have had a highball in his hand". However, Plagenhoef viewed West as "an entertainer and a perfectionist-- a bang-for-your-buck guy" and presumed that the attendees "got their money's worth". Providing a negative review for Cokemachineglow, Lindsay Zoladz called VH1 Storytellers an "extravagant, bombastic mess" and attributed this to West's "relentless martyr complex" being given a storytelling format. Zoladz felt that the album focuses on West's antics and shows his "crazy at its most potent", although was impressed by the lighting and "tremendous backing band".

== Track listing ==
Adapted from AllMusic.

1. "See You in My Nightmares" – 3:13
2. "RoboCop" – 6:17
3. "Flashing Lights" – 6:41
4. "Amazing" – 8:24
5. "Touch the Sky" – 9:53
6. "Say You Will" – 7:42
7. "Good Life" – 6:30
8. "Heartless / Pinocchio Story" – 11:01
9. "Stronger" – 4:53

Total length: 64:34
