= RoboCop (song) =

2008 song by Kanye West

Song by Kanye West

from the album 808s & Heartbreak
- Released: November 24, 2008
- Recorded: 2008
- Studio: Glenwood (Burbank, California); Avex Recording (Honolulu, Hawaii)
- Genre: Art pop, industrial
- Length: 4:34
- Label: Roc-A-Fella; Def Jam
- Songwriters: Kanye West; Jenny-Bea Englishman; Malik Jones; Dexter Mills; Scott Mescudi; Antony Williams; Jeff Bhasker; Faheem Najm; Jay Jenkins; Patrick Doyle
- Producer: Kanye West

"RoboCop" is a song by American rapper Kanye West from his fourth studio album, 808s & Heartbreak (2008). The song contains background vocals from Tony Williams and Jeff Bhasker. It was solely produced by West, who served as a songwriter alongside Esthero, Malik Yusef, Consequence, Kid Cudi, Williams, Bhasker, T-Pain, and Young Jeezy. Due to the embodiment of Patrick Doyle's work, a songwriting credit for him was added. The song was recorded in 2008 across numerous studios, being tweaked to perfection. Manny Marroquin explained how it was a challenge to make, confirming that multiple versions were created. An art pop number with an orchestral style, it embodies portions of "Kissing in the Rain", performed by Doyle.

In the lyrics of the song, West reflects on his break-up with Alexis Phifer. After having experienced an internet leak in October 2008, "RoboCop" was included as the seventh track on the album in November. The song received generally positive reviews from music critics, who mostly applauded the composition. Some selected it as an album highlight and reception of West's vocals was lukewarm, though a few critics disliked the structure. West recorded an accompanying music video with Amber Rose, though it was never released. West performed the song in February 2009 for his second live album, VH1 Storytellers (2010).

== Background and recording ==
West's 2007 hit single "Can't Tell Me Nothing" was passed on to him by American rapper and his Def Jam labelmate Young Jeezy, who performs ad-libs on the song. Following the success of "Can't Tell Me Nothing", Young Jeezy felt as if he deserved a feature from West and later guested him on his single "Put On" (2008). West subsequently featured the rapper on 808s & Heartbreak track "Amazing", marking the second collaboration between the two of them. Speaking of "RoboCop" in 2008, Young Jeezy referred to how people can "hear some songs and they just sound big", calling the song an example of this and saying it immediately "just sounds like a big hit". On the album's 10th anniversary in 2018, fellow rapper Consequence described the song as "so conceptual" and said it "would've probably been an easier rhyme to write". In an interview for Complex a year later, he likened West's ninth studio album Jesus Is King (2019) to 808s & Heartbreak creatively; he cited writing the song's chorus as part of his challenging involvement. "RoboCop" was produced solely by West, who co-wrote it with Esthero, Malik Yusef, Consequence, Kid Cudi, frequent collaborators Tony Williams and Jeff Bhasker, T-Pain, and Young Jeezy, while Scottish film composer Patrick Doyle also received credit since he wrote the 1998 recording "Kissing in the Rain" that the song embodies. A rough version of the song leaked online in October 2008, after West collaborator Mike Dean had confirmed earlier that month how it was supposed to receive Herbie Hancock's "magic touch" before the album's release while he was in France. West blogged that he lacked any responsibility for the unfinished version's leak, admitting he was "pretty upset about it, but that's the way life is sometimes!"

"RoboCop" draws its title from the 1987 film of the same name. An 11-piece orchestra played for the song, being conducted by Larry Gold. (Note: See credits and personnel for the roles of the entire orchestra.) It was recorded during the three week period that West worked on the album in 2008, being tweaked to perfection across different studios while he was on his Glow in the Dark Tour. West collaborator A-Trak recalled in 2015 from working with West on the song that he asks everyone for his recording approach while feeling "super confident" with his vision and being sufficiently honest about his limitations, knowing bringing "some of the greatest people into the room" will create a better product. A-Trak explained that West asked literally anyone what they think of something and reply "Okay, cool", before asking how they would do the instrument and going back to assembling; he praised West's team effort. On the 10th anniversary of 808s & Heartbreak, engineer Anthony Kilhoffer cast light on the "never-ending production decisions" for the track, which he felt evoked the mixing of West's single "Stronger" (2007). According to fellow engineer Manny Marroquin, West was not 100 percent happy with the track. Marroquin viewed the creation of the track as "challenging" since West "heard it in his head and he couldn't get it", thus three or four different versions were created. Esthero revealed a demo exists with an alternate string arrangement that she prefers to the final version, admitting she was unsure of how long they worked on the demo's production. However, Esthero could remember randomly coming out with lyrics in a room; she recalled responding to West's work being played "over and over again" by pointing out what words sounds were close to and attempting to fix sentences.

== Composition and lyrics ==
Musically, "RoboCop" is an art pop number. As it progresses, the time signature shifts. The song embodies portions of "Kissing in the Rain", written and performed by Doyle. It contains gunshots, police sirens, and crashing drums, which are backed by lush strings. The melody is slightly altered throughout by the strings, which were arranged by Gold and engineered by Jeff Chestek, who was assisted by Rick Friedrich, Montez Roberts, and John Stahl. The song has orchestral effects, featuring layered violins alongside violas. It also incorporates a cello, bass, and keyboards, the latter of which were played by Bhasker. The orchestra was added to the chorus by Ken Lewis, while Bhasker and Williams perform background vocals on the song. Auto-Tune is utilized strongly on West's voice throughout, with him performing verses, a chorus, and an interlude.

In the lyrics of "RoboCop", West reminisces on the break-up between him and his ex-fiancée Alexis Phifer. He expresses anger towards Phifer, calling her "a drama queen" and comparing her to both the antagonist from the 1990 film Misery and RoboCop's cyborg titular character. West casts doubt on ever becoming a robot on the song's interlude, alluding to him using Auto-Tune for a creative venture. At the end of the verses, he utilizes the character's "drop it" catchphrase. On the outro, West repeatedly delivers a stanza about his lack of trust in Phifer: "You spoiled little L.A. girl / You're just an L.A. girl."

== Release and reception ==
On November 24, 2008, "RoboCop" was released as the seventh track on West's fourth studio album 808s & Heartbreak. The song was met with generally positive reviews from music critics, often being praised for its composition. Writing for The A.V. Club, Nathan Rabin observed how the "infectiously goofy" song is given "a symphonic grandeur" by the "[s]oaring strings". musicOMH's Adam Conner-Simons stated the song "serves as a fascinating exercise in controlled chaos" through "lilting faux-strings, quick-shifting time signatures", and "sparkling" verses that discuss West's "psycho" ex-partner. PopMatters critic Dave Heaton opined that the song is one of "the bleakest or even meanest tracks lyrically" on the album, further labeling it a "triumphant" pop song on which the consistent feeling of heartbreak is portrayed "while lifting off in jubilant ways". Heaton also said the song "picks up from" the various "pieces" of previous track "Paranoid", elaborating that it has "a similar tenor but lighter and almost busier by nature"; he noticed the "crashing drums" are partnered with slight melody-altering "delicate strings". RapReviews writer Jesal 'Jay Soul' Padania desired that West had channeled the "cynical" song's "kinetic energy" throughout the album, which he thought would have created "real tension" in a good way. The staff of The Observer placed the song among the tracks from 808s & Heartbreak to download, noting that West "chides over [its] terrific jackhammer rhythm". Scott Plagenhoef from Pitchfork chose the song as one of the album's best songs and cited how the "cavernous production" provides West's Auto-Tuned vocals with "more of an echoing desolation than a pop sheen", as well as ranking its strings among the sonic highlights.

Steve Jones of USA Today recommended the song as one of the tracks from the album to download, an opinion that was shared by Blender's Josh Eells. For the Chicago Sun-Times, Jim DeRogatis characterized the song as an occasion where West's Auto-Tune formula is "touching and very effective" on 808s & Heartbreak. Lean Greenblatt from Entertainment Weekly wrote the song stands among the album's lighter moments, calling it a humorous ode "to an irresistible but wacked-out ladyfriend" that provides "an aural palate cleanser", focusing on West's special wordplay ability. Spin journalist Charles Aaron felt mixed about the song, writing it is the exception to the album's "strangely rushed and unfinished" feel by attempting moving "beyond a verse/chorus to a bridge", though was saddened how this resulted in "a trainwreck of the string-festooned 'Estella's Theme' from Great Expectations, thudding drums", and a clumsy interlude by West. In a negative review for The Boston Phoenix, Richard Beck saw the song as the largest example of the rather unexpected "outright failures" on 808s & Heartbreak due to its "awful chorus". Chris Richards of The Washington Post disregarded the song as the album's only dud, criticizing its "heavily orchestrated hyper-schmaltz" and West bringing "his Mannheim Steamroller for an inexplicable lap around the block".

== Canceled music video ==
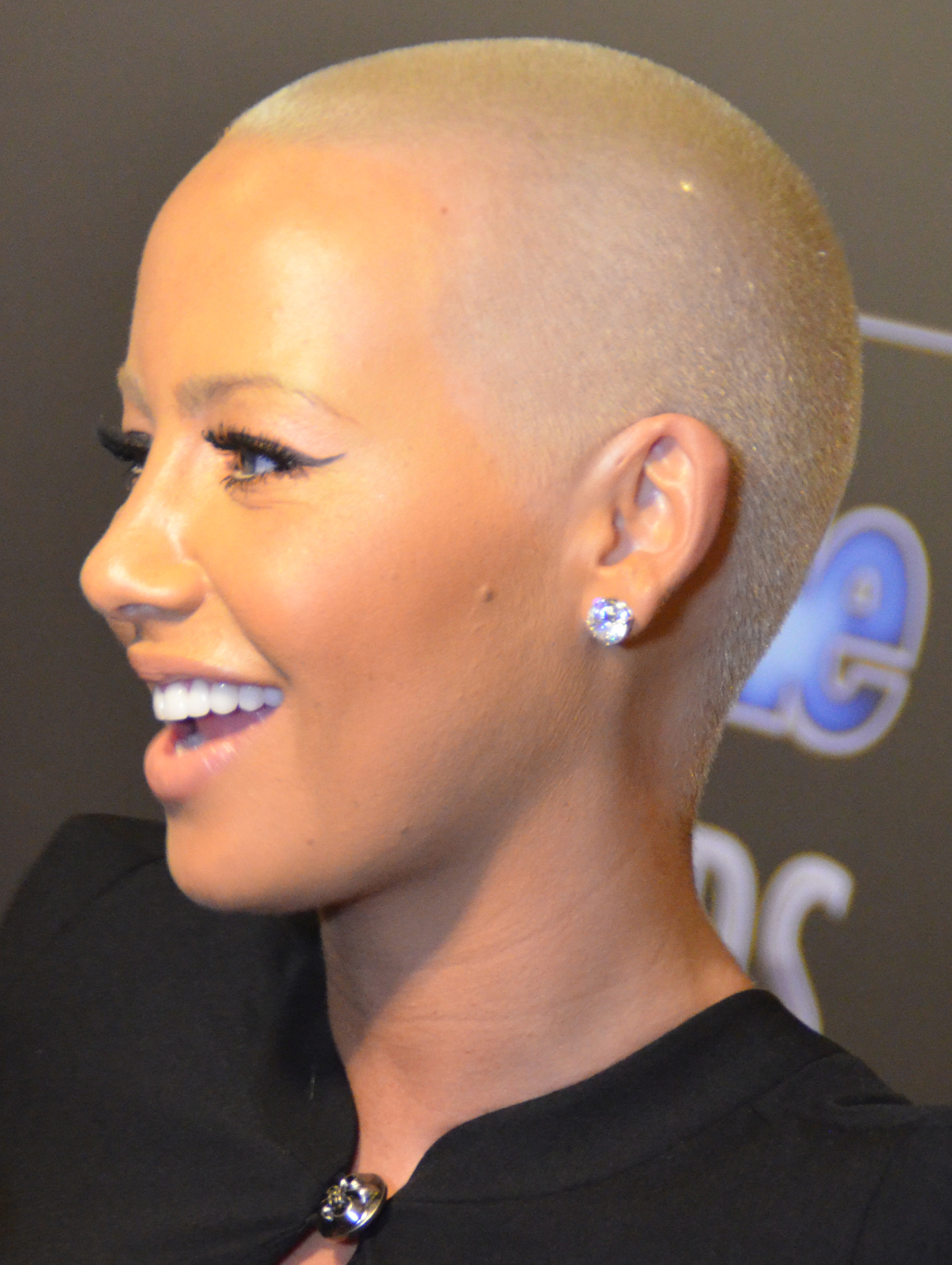
Amber Rose worked with West on a music video for the song in 2009.

On March 11, 2009, Clash reported that West was shooting a music video for the song with his then-girlfriend Amber Rose. It was recorded in Los Angeles after West had to persuade Rose to fly there for the shooting. Speaking to MTV News four months later, Rose said that she plays a robot throughout the video and appears alone for 95 percent of it. During an on-set interview, West expressed that the visual was inspired by his love for video games, characterizing making a video look equally good to a game as "the holy grail". He explained that rather than utilizing computer-generated imagery, the "intensity" should come off the screen.

The music video was directed by Hype Williams. Although the video did not have an official release, Shihan Barbee shared a 13-second stop-motion clip from it to Instagram on August 8, 2014. Accompanying the clip, Barbee posted: "Wish he had released this video. Super dope." The clip has a pink technicolor backdrop, which West stands in front while wearing a tuxedo that accompanies his faux hawk and tucking his hands in his pockets. West stands face-to-face with a nude robot that has Rose's head digitally inserted onto it with the addition of sunglasses; she makes robotic movements simultaneously with him rapping. At certain points, West makes exaggerated faces to the camera.

The full version of the music video was leaked in October 2024.

== Live performances and appearances in media ==
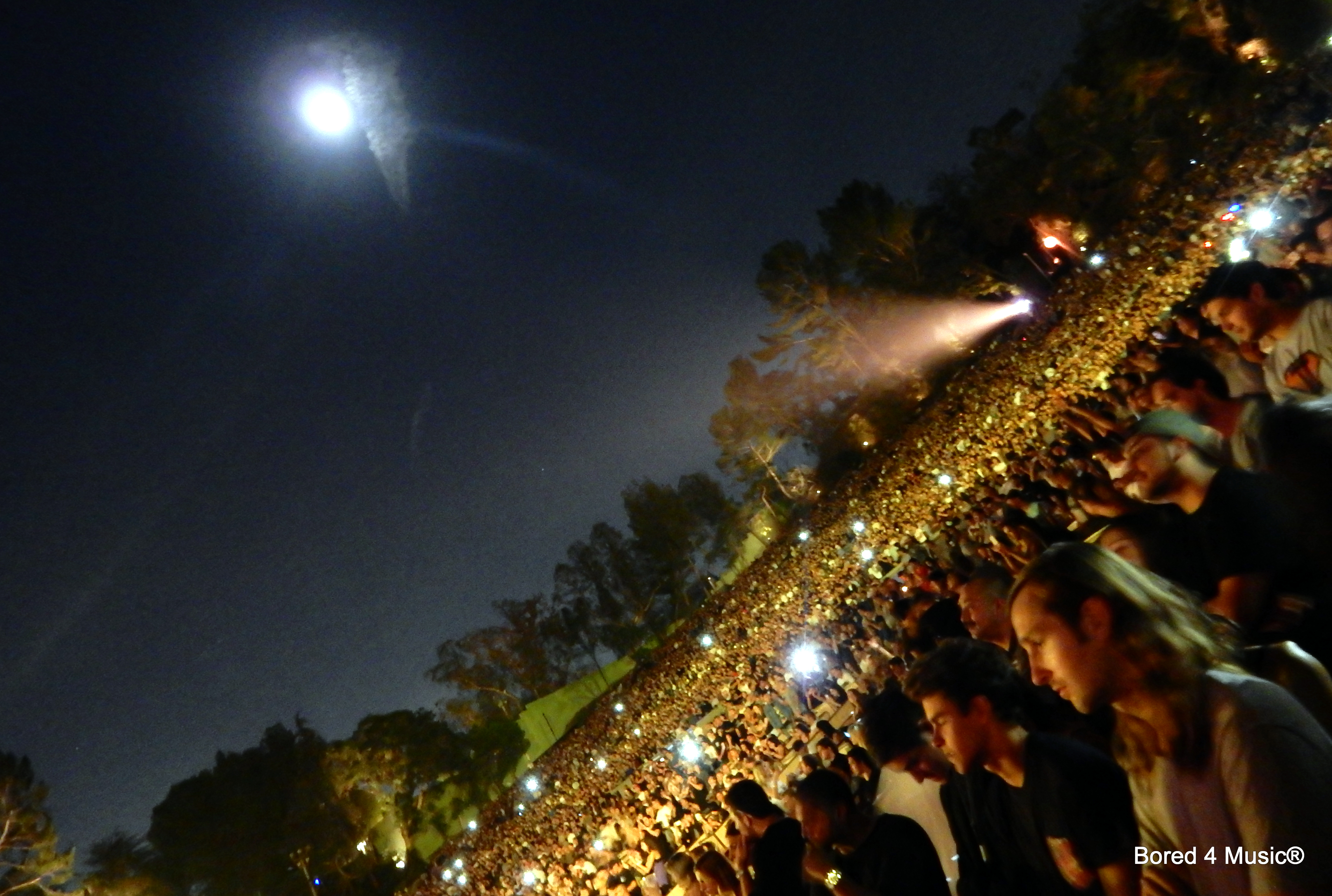
While West performed the song live at the 2015 Hollywood Bowl in Los Angeles, the crowd sang along with the "Spoiled little L.A. girl" line after he prompted them to do so.

West segued from an opening performance of fellow album track "See You in My Nightmares" for his February 2009 VH1 show into one of "RoboCop"; the show was later released as his second live album VH1 Storytellers in January 2010. He let out various thoughts over the four minutes of instrumentation following the song, mentioning his musical influences, including Tenacious D for the stanza "You spoiled little L.A. girl / You're just an L.A. girl" that he sang multiple times towards the end of the song. West also told the story behind the song, before going on about irrelevant topics. For West's two night concert of 808s & Heartbreak in its entirety at the 2015 Hollywood Bowl, he performed the song as the set's seventh number. This marked West's first performance of the song since July 2, 2009. During the performance, West rocked loose garments in white and off-white shades, while he had support from a small band and a medium-sized orchestra. The crowd sang along with the song's "Spoiled little L.A. girl" line after West encouraged them to do so; the venue itself is in Los Angeles.

West released the track "No More Parties in LA" on January 18, 2016, which sees him reference the song by rapping: "We need the turbo thots, high speed, turbo thots/Drop-drop-drop-drop it like Robocop". Speaking on Ebro in the Morning for Hot 97 in February of that year, Lil Uzi Vert listed the song as his favorite from 808s and Heartbreak. In August 2016, West's wife Kim Kardashian included "RoboCop" on a playlist of her top 28 favorite songs by him.

== Credits and personnel ==
Information taken from 808s & Heartbreak liner notes.

Recording

- Recorded at Glenwood Studios (Burbank, California) and Avex Recording Studio (Honolulu, Hawaii)

Personnel

- Kanye West – songwriter, producer
- Jeff Bhasker – songwriter, keyboards, background vocals
- Tony Williams – songwriter, background vocals
- Jenny-Bea Englishman – songwriter
- Malik Jones – songwriter
- Dexter Mills – songwriter
- Scott Mescudi – songwriter
- Faheem Najm – songwriter
- Jay Jenkins – songwriter
- Patrick Doyle – songwriter
- Andrew Dawson – recorder
- Anthony Kilhoffer – recorder
- Chad Carlisle – assistant recorder
- Isha Erskine – assistant recorder
- Gaylord Holomalia – assistant recorder
- Christian Mochizuki – assistant recorder
- Manny Marroquin – mix engineer
- Christian Plata – assistant engineer
- Erik Madrid – assistant engineer
- Jeff Chestek – string engineer
- Rick Friedrich – assistant string engineer
- Montez Roberts – assistant string engineer
- John Stahl – assistant string engineer

Additional musicians

- Larry Gold – string arrangement and conducting
- Ken Lewis – orchestra in chorus
- Olga Konopelsky – violin
- Emma Kummrow – violin
- Luigi Mazzochi – violin
- Charles Parker – violin
- Igor Szwec – violin
- Gregory Teperman – violin
- Davis Barnett – viola
- Alexandra Leem – viola
- James J. Cooper, III – cello
- Jennie Lorenzo – cello
- Miles Davis – bass
