= Amazing (Kanye West song) =

2009 song by Kanye West

Single by Kanye West featuring Young Jeezy

from the album 808s & Heartbreak
- Released: March 10, 2009
- Recorded: 2008
- Studio: Glenwood (Burbank, California); Avex Recording (Honolulu, Hawaii)
- Genre: Hip hop
- Length: 3:58
- Label: Roc-A-Fella; Def Jam
- Songwriters: Kanye West; Malik Jones; Dexter Mills; Jeff Bhasker; Jay Jenkins
- Producer: Kanye West

Kanye West singles chronology
"Go Hard" (2008)	"Amazing" (2009)	"Paranoid" (2009)

Young Jeezy singles chronology
"Never Ever" (2009)	"Amazing" (2009)	"Fed Up" (2009)

Music video
- "Amazing" on YouTube

"Amazing" is a song by American rapper Kanye West from his fourth studio album, 808s & Heartbreak (2008). The song features a guest appearance from Young Jeezy, and includes background vocals from Mr Hudson and Tony Williams. It was produced by West, while co-produced by Jeff Bhasker. The producers wrote the song alongside Malik Yusef, Consequence, Jeff Bhasker, and Young Jeezy. The song was serviced to US rhythmic contemporary and urban contemporary radio stations as the third single from the album on March 10, 2009, by Roc-A-Fella and Def Jam. A hip hop song with heavy pop influences, it features piano. Lyrically, West sings an attempt to capture part of his former bravado. The cover depicts a broken heart surrounded by a blue heart-shaped maze, a play on the song name ("A-maze-ing").

"Amazing" received generally positive reviews from music critics, most of whom complimented Young Jeezy's feature. Some praised the composition and structure, while numerous critics chose the song as an album highlight. At the 52nd Annual Grammy Awards, it was nominated for Best Rap Performance By a Duo or Group. In 2009, the song charted at number 81 on the US Billboard Hot 100 and number 42 on the Swedish Singles Chart. It has since been certified platinum in the United States by the Recording Industry Association of America (RIAA).

An accompanying music video premiered via BET's 106 & Park on April 23, 2009. The video was shot in Kauai, Hawaii, with it prominently featuring aerial shots of the Hawaiian Islands. The visual was ranked by BET as among the top 100 videos of 2009. West provided performances of "Amazing" throughout 2009, including one for his second live album, VH1 Storytellers (2010). The song was used by the National Basketball Association (NBA) in a campaign for the 2009 playoffs, before it was later featured on the respective soundtracks of the video games NBA 2K10 and NBA 2K13.

== Background and conception ==
West's 2007 hit single "Can't Tell Me Nothing" was passed on to him by American rapper and his Def Jam labelmate Young Jeezy, who performs ad-libs on the song. Following the success of "Can't Tell Me Nothing", Young Jeezy felt that West "owed him one" because of the ad-libs being used and featured him on his single "Put On" (2008). The rapper recalled that West was initially reluctant to guest on the single due to his time on hiatus, before calling him back 10 minutes later and performing his verse. "Put On" was the first record that West performed through Auto-Tune on, while "Amazing" marked the second collaboration between him and Young Jeezy. The former was nominated for the Best Rap Performance by a Duo or Group award at the 51st Annual Grammy Awards in 2009, standing as the first collaboration between the two to be nominated for a Grammy Award. Young Jeezy said of fellow album track "RoboCop", which he co-wrote, in 2008: "You know how you hear some songs and they just sound big? That's one of them. Right away, it just sounds like a big hit." In a 2019 interview for Complex, fellow rapper Consequence likened West's ninth studio album Jesus Is King from that year to 808s & Heartbreak creatively; he cited writing the chorus to "Amazing" as part of his challenging involvement. The song was produced by West and co-produced by his frequent collaborator Victor Alexander; the pair co-wrote it with Malik Yusef, Consequence, and Young Jeezy. "Amazing" was recorded during the three week period that West worked on the album in 2008.

Bhasker discussed the song's conception: "That was actually the first song [we did for the album.] I brought the beat and the music. I started the idea and [West] was like, 'That's hot.' [...] So I brought that music and he brought his editorial to it and then wrote the melody, and said we're gonna get Jeezy on it. We were searching for sort of a tribal-ish drum sounds and that just came out. It's a very simple and dark sounding piano figure."

== Composition and lyrics ==
"Amazing"
A 20-second sample of "Amazing", featuring dark and tender piano combined with bass and drums in its musical style. Alongside the instrumentation, West mutters through Auto-Tune in a low-pitched and depressed voice that he is "a problem that will never ever be solved", presenting dealing with himself as difficult.

Musically, "Amazing" is a stripped-down hip hop hype song, with influences of 1980s pop. The song combines usage of tender piano with bass and drums for its style, the former of which carries the harmonies. Keyboards are also included, which are performed by Bhasker. Throughout the song, West sings through Auto-Tune in a low-pitched and depressed voice, despite him showing arrogance. West has assistance from the grunting of background vocalists Mr Hudson and Tony Williams on the track. He performs the chorus, which features chants at every downbeat. The song goes through a beat switch for Young Jeezy's verse, which is the only rapping present and is preceded by moaning sounds. The rapper performs in a rough voice. The track includes West boasting and trying to capture some of his former bravado.

In the lyrics of the song, West boasts while trying to capture some of his former bravado, including him muttering "I'm a problem that will never ever be solved". This problem was partly created by bravado, as masculine pride has long been used as a force for the obliteration of vulnerability in rap, such as usage by DMX and the Geto Boys. On the chorus, West repeatedly sings "so amazing". West depicts a difficulty in dealing with himself on the song, showing hopelessness that he cannot "be solved" and his "rein is as far as your eyes can see". Young Jeezy's verse features him worrying about his blood pressure and the inevitability of defeat, as well as applauding West who he believes "go[es] so hard".

== Release and reception ==
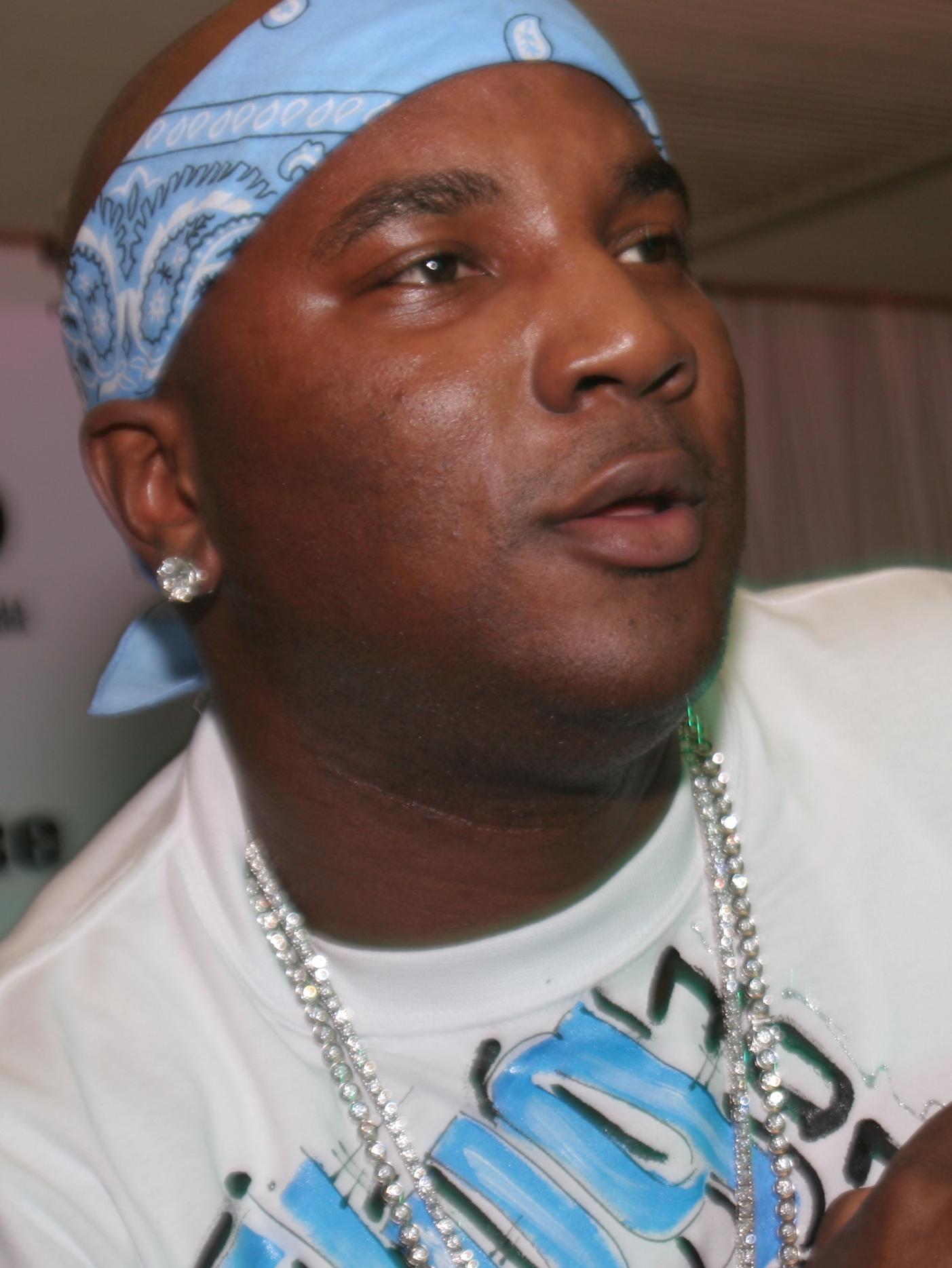
Several writers applauded Young Jeezy's feature.

On November 24, 2008, the track was released as the fourth track on West's fourth studio album 808s & Heartbreak. Five months later, "Amazing" was serviced to US rhythmic contemporary and urban contemporary radio stations as the album's third single on March 10, 2009, and had been known to be scheduled for release as a single since February. The song was met with generally positive reviews from music critics. In a positive review, Alex Macpherson of The Guardian pointed to Young Jeezy's guest appearance as being among "the isolated moments of levity" on 808s & Heartbreak that "are a relief". Writing for NPR, Oliver Wang thought "the haunting cross-section of tender pianos" and the rapper's "menace" on the song showcase the album's "fantastic raw sounds". The New York Times critic Jon Caramanica saw the "visceral" Young Jeezy collaboration as sounding like "it were recorded inside a whirring old grandfather clock, a collection of precisely moving parts neatly interlocking — classic Kanye". The staff of NME remarked that the song is a "sizzurp-addled juggernaut closer", which sees the rapper quickly producing "some much-needed gruff machismo". Spin journalist Charles Aaron noted the song's potential to be part of "a greatest-hits comp one day and be accepted as Kanyeezy standards", attributing this to Young Jeezy's "welcome bluster of sodium-deficient thug-you-can-hug". For Urb, Brandon Perkins felt the song "delicately plods along beautiful builds" up to the point that "the bottom drops out" and the rapper performs his verse with a "monstrous (and yet understated) flair". PopMatters' Dave Heaton commented that the song is "filled with unusual sounds" and noticed the "coldness" of West's voice initially sings "a purposely repetitive tune" while "balanced by choir-ish vocals and keyboard", commenting how the "lower, growling backing vocals" ultimately "turn to a Chewbacca-like grunt". He elaborated, chronicling that the background vocals combined with the beats "conveys a toughness even while the song creeps forward with gentle melancholy", going on to describe Young Jeezy's feature as perfectly chosen for "the cold atmosphere" of 808s & Heartbreak.

In Vibe, Jozen Cummings graded the song as the album's "true triumph" due to the "drums reminiscent of HBCU marching bands and haunting chants", which he said "bridges the gap" between West's love for pop and hip hop "while keeping his musical integrity intact". Cummings further observed how the moment is "so good" that "even Jeezy has to give his boy props" on his "brief, but memorable verse". Wilson McBee from Slant Magazine saw the song as taking "a ruminative piano riff, West's catchiest tune and a shuffling drumbeat evocative of a broomstick on marble to spin an eerie vision of a kingpin's braggadocio" that prominently shows "disgust and sarcasm" as "Lord Kanye surveys his minions of chipmunk-soul-producers and pink-polo-wearers" to realize "it's worth little more than peanuts". McBee also regarded Young Jeezy's "joyless, snarling addendum" that features him worrying about his blood pressure and "the inevitability of defeat" to be a suitable "thank you" for West's appearance on "Put On". The Washington Post's Chris Richards picked "Amazing" as one of the album's tracks that should be downloaded, a sentiment also held by Steve Jones of USA Today and Josh Eells of Blender. In a mixed review for No Ripcord, Cara Nash said although the song "may prove more commercially viable" than others on 808s & Heartbreak, she was disappointed in how Young Jeezy's vocals disrupt the album's "introspective flow". Scott Plagenhoef from Pitchfork was negative about the song, calling it one of 808s & Heartbreak's "low points" and blaming Young Jeezy's appearance by opining that "when the mood is broken up by outsiders or actual rapping, the results aren't pretty". The Boston Globe's James Reed criticized West's songwriting on the "shockingly shallow hook" because of "so amazing" being repeated, complaining that not even the rapper's feature adds "much life" to the song, stating he "sound[s] like he's just snuffed out his 100th cigarette of the day".

=== Accolades ===
"Amazing" was nominated for the Best Rap Performance by a Duo or Group at the 2010 Grammy Awards, which was the only nomination that 808s & Heartbreak earned West. The song ultimately lost the award to the single "Crack a Bottle" by Eminem featuring 50 Cent and Dr. Dre. At the 2009 BET Hip Hop Awards, the song was nominated for the Verizon People's Champ Award, ultimately losing to "Throw It in the Bag" by Fabolous featuring The-Dream.

== Music video ==
=== Background and synopsis ===
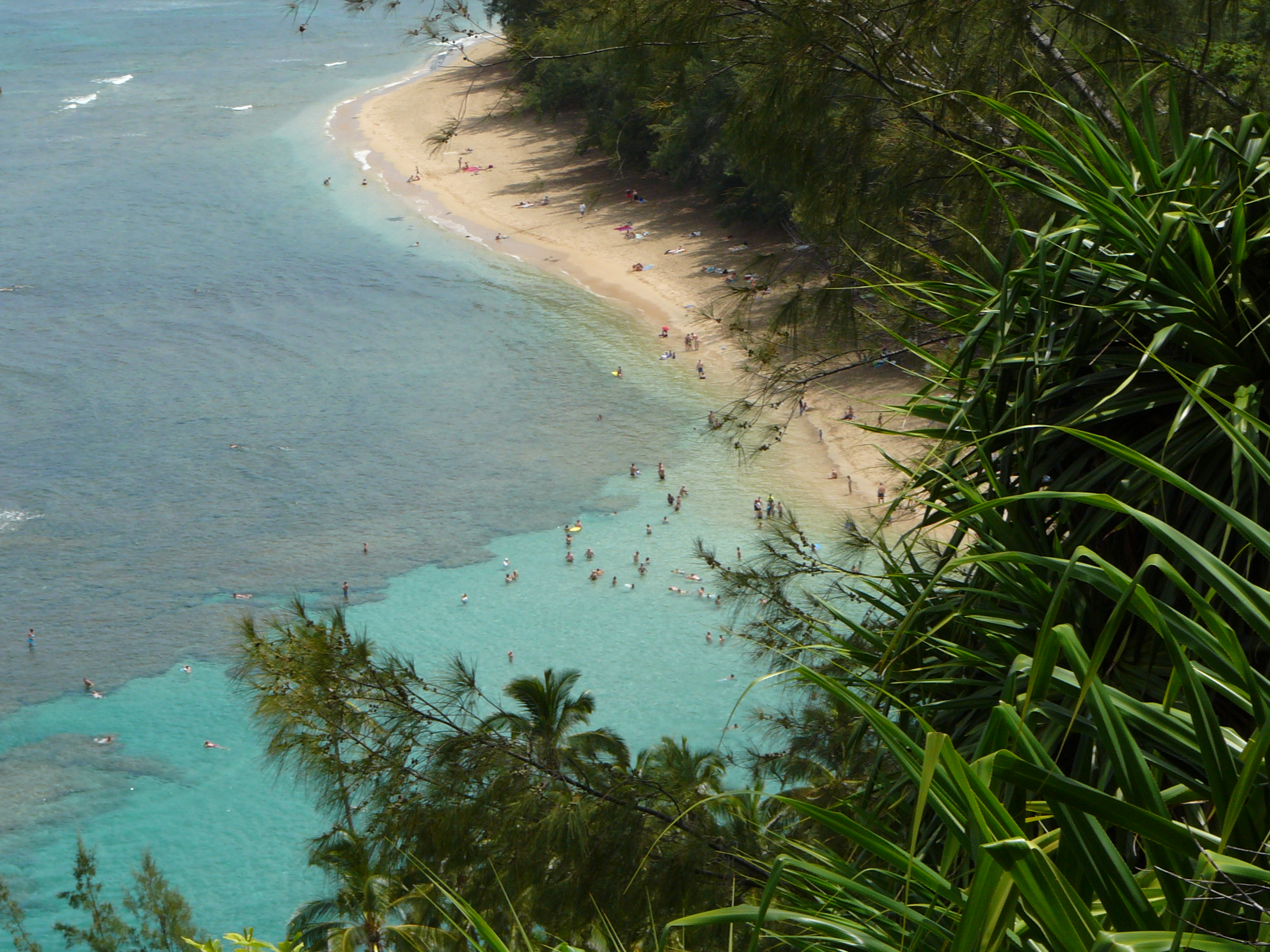
The music video was filmed in Kauai, Hawaii.

The music video for "Amazing" was filmed in Kauai, Hawaii and directed by frequent collaborator Hype Williams, who rented a helicopter with West for it; there was a high production value. West blogged about being in Hawaii on March 27, 2009, with Rap-Up reporting on April 13 that West had shot the video in the country. On the same day that the website reported him to be in Hawaii, West posted stills from the music video on his blog and wrote "AMAZING feat. YOUNG JEEZY directed by HYPE WILLIAMS coming soon. Here's some stills till then!" On April 23, 2009, the video premiered on BET's music video show 106 & Park; West had released multiple music videos for 808s & Heartbreak by this time.

The video includes a series of aerial shots of the Hawaiian Islands and sees West contemplating nature whilst feeling lonesome. Young Jeezy has a cameo in it, along with a girl wearing a bikini by the fire.

=== Reception ===
For Stereogum, Amrit Singh claimed that the "aerial shots of Hawaii are inherently amazing" and wrote of West's appearance that "seeing him contemplating nature by his lonesome has a certain poetry to it". Despite not being a fan of "Amazing" itself, shamz of Okayplayer praised the video, writing: "Hype Williams really put his foot in this video. I'm contemplating booking that flight to Hawaii as we speak." The staff of Pitchfork looked at the music video as what "has some seriously high production values". The music video ranked at number 91 on BET's Notarized: Top 100 Videos of 2009 countdown.

== Commercial performance ==
Despite not being initially released as a single, "Amazing" debuted at number 89 on the US Billboard Hot 100 following the album's release. The song later exited the Hot 100 before re-entering to peak at number 81 on the issue dated May 14, 2009, after being released as a single. It lasted for five weeks on the chart. On March 28, 2009, the song opened at number 96 on the US Hot R&B/Hip-Hop Songs chart. The song moved up four spaces to number 92 on the chart the following week, before it later peaked at number 65 on April 18. One week before achieving its peak on the Hot R&B/Hip-Hop Songs chart, the song entered the US Hot Rap Songs chart at number 22. The song further peaked at number 32 on the US Rhythmic chart issue dated April 25, 2009. "Amazing" was certified platinum by the Recording Industry Association of America (RIAA) on April 1, 2015, having amassed 1,000,000 certified units in the United States. Elsewhere in North America, the song reached number 63 on the Billboard Hot Canadian Digital Singles chart. On June 12, 2009, the song debuted on the Swedish Singles Chart at number 42.

== Live performances ==
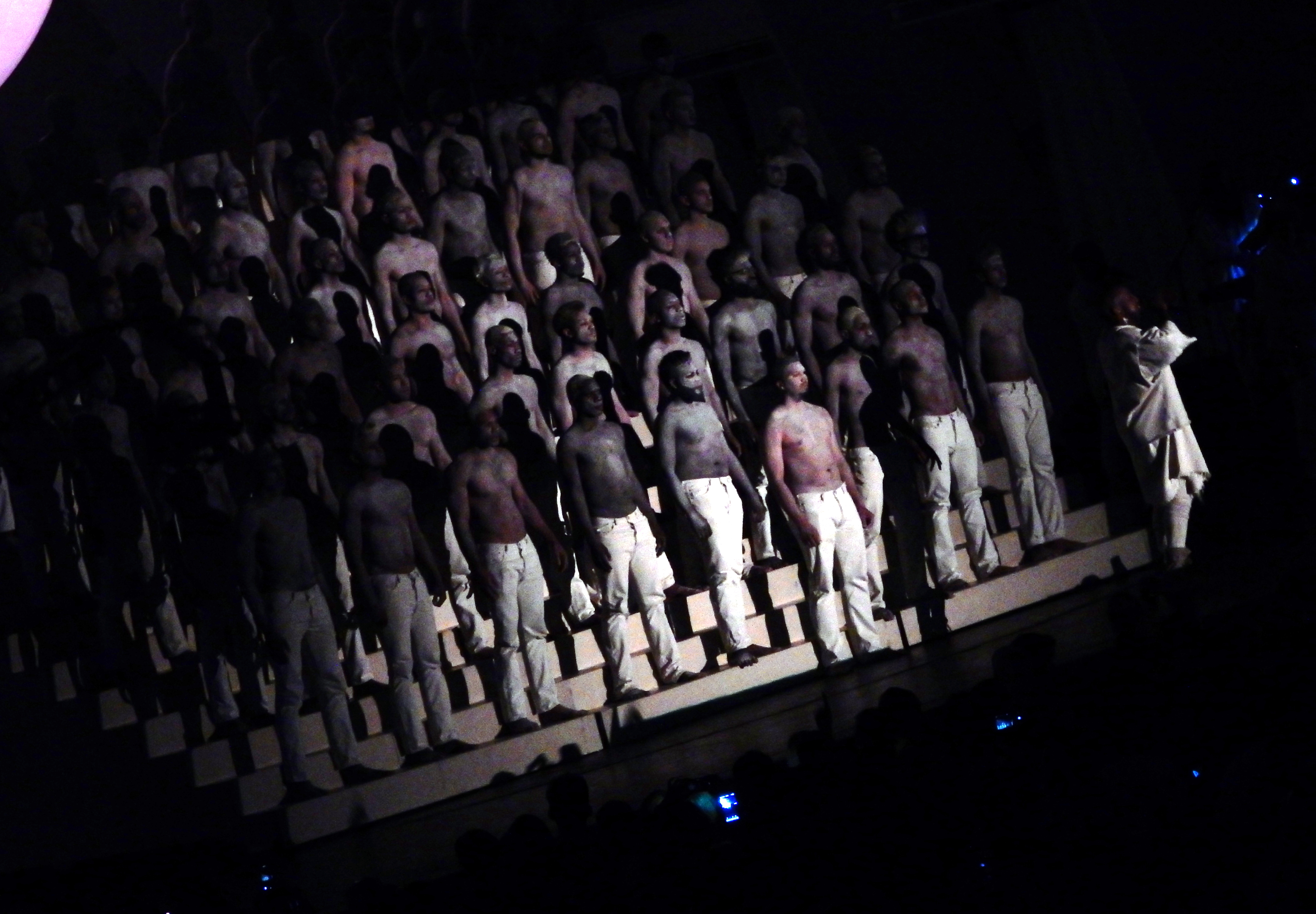
During his performance of the song at the 2015 Hollywood Bowl, West stood in front of a group of shirtless men who wore white jeans and were covered in white powder.

West and Young Jeezy first performed "Amazing" live for BET's 106 & Park on November 25, 2008, where they segued from the performance into one of "Put On". West delivered a performance of the former for his February 2009 VH1 show, which was released as his second live album VH1 Storytellers in January 2010. A piano figure and finger snaps backed him for the performance, the latter of which the audience clapped along with. West spoke about the story behind the song and in the middle of the performance, he complained about being scrutinized by the media, before issuing an apology for "acting like a bitch at award shows". He stated the song's title directly after his separate name-drops of Michael Jackson and Michael Phelps; the audience responded favorably on both occasions. However, the crowd were silent when West said "amazing" after mentioning O. J. Simpson, with West directly questioning if he was amazing or not for "what he did". West also made comments defending Chris Brown that caused controversy, though these were edited out of the broadcast.

On March 21, 2009, West opened his GOOD Music concert at Levi's/Fader Fort for South by Southwest (SXSW) by performing the song with a seven-piece band. West's outfit for the performance consisted of a gold bullet necklace, black sunglasses, and a sleeveless denim vest. While performing, he welcomed fans to his concert. For his headlining set for the 2009 Wireless Festival at Hyde Park in London, West performed the song as he rocked his customary aviator shades and black suit jacket. During West's two night concert of 808s & Heartbreak in its entirety at the 2015 Hollywood Bowl, he performed the song as the set's fourth number. This marked West's first performance of the song since July 2, 2009, with him wearing loose garments in white and off-white shades for it. Onstage bleachers rose behind him that had dozens of shirtless men with white jeans standing on them, who were covered in white powder and stood close to one another. The performance saw West pacing around the stage alongside fireworks being shot into the sky that were followed by Young Jeezy appearing to perform his verse from the song, accompanied by a piano melody. Staging glitches impacted the show, with the rapper's microphone being switched off at parts, and West stopping and restarting the music towards the end of the song while attempting to complain, "This is one of the best dress rehearsals...so please excuse..."

== In the media ==
"Amazing" was used by the National Basketball Association (NBA) during the 2009 playoffs as part of their advertisement campaign, with players such as LeBron James and Kobe Bryant being sequenced playing basketball alongside the audio. The song was used for the soundtracks of video games NBA 2K10 and NBA 2K13. UFC fighter Frank Mir has used "Amazing" as his entrance music for his fights. Kanye's daughter North West revealed in her first-ever interview on August 28, 2017 that the track is her favourite song by him, naming the reason behind this as it being "so amazing".

== Credits and personnel ==
Information taken from 808s & Heartbreak liner notes.

Recording

- Recorded at Glenwood Studios (Burbank, California) and Avex Recording Studio (Honolulu, Hawaii)

Personnel

- Kanye West – songwriter, producer
- Jeff Bhasker – songwriter, co-producer, keyboards
- Malik Jones – songwriter
- Dexter Mills – songwriter
- Jay Jenkins – songwriter
- Andrew Dawson – recorder
- Anthony Kilhoffer – recorder
- Chad Carlisle – assistant recorder
- Isha Erskine – assistant recorder
- Gaylord Holomalia – assistant recorder
- Christian Mochizuki – assistant recorder
- Manny Marroquin – mix engineer
- Christian Plata – assistant engineer
- Erik Madrid – assistant engineer
- Mr Hudson – background vocals
- Tony Williams – background vocals

== Charts ==
Chart performance for "Amazing"
Chart (2008–09)	Peak position
Hot Canadian Digital Singles (Billboard)	63
Mexico Ingles Airplay (Billboard)	32
Sweden (Sverigetopplistan)	42
US Billboard Hot 100	81
US Hot R&B/Hip-Hop Songs (Billboard)	65
US Hot Rap Songs (Billboard)	22
US Rhythmic Airplay (Billboard)	32

== Certifications ==
Certifications for "Amazing"
Region	Certification	Certified units/sales
United States (RIAA)	2× Platinum	2,000,000^{‡}
^{‡} Sales+streaming figures based on certification alone.

== Release history ==
Release dates and formats for "Amazing"
Region	Date	Format	Label(s)	Ref.
United States	March 10, 2009	Rhythmic contemporary radio	Roc-A-Fella; Def Jam	
United States	March 10, 2009	Urban contemporary radio	Roc-A-Fella; Def Jam	
