= Flashing Lights =

2007 single by Kanye West

Single by Kanye West featuring Dwele

from the album Graduation
- B-side: "Stronger" (Andrew Dawson remix)
- Released: November 20, 2007
- Recorded: 2007
- Studio: Chalice (Los Angeles); Chunk King (NYC)
- Genre: Hip-hop; electro rap; R&B
- Length: 3:57: 2:54 (video edit)
- Label: Roc-A-Fella; Def Jam
- Songwriters: Kanye West; Eric Hudson
- Producers: Kanye West; Eric Hudson

Kanye West singles chronology
"Pro Nails" (2007)	"Flashing Lights" (2007)	"Homecoming" (2008)

Dwele singles chronology
"The People" (2007)	"Flashing Lights" (2007)	"I'm Cheatin'" (2008)

Music video
- "Flashing Lights" on YouTube

"Flashing Lights" is a song by American rapper Kanye West from his third studio album, Graduation (2007). The song features a guest appearance from R&B singer Dwele and additional vocals from Australian singer Connie Mitchell. West co-wrote and co-produced the song with Eric Hudson, who had completed the production before the duo added a live string section in 2007. It was released to US rhythmic contemporary radio as the album's fourth single on November 20, 2007, by Roc-A-Fella Records and Def Jam Recordings. A hip-hop, electro rap, and R&B song with elements of numerous genres, it prominently utilizes strings and synths. Lyrically, the song features West rapping about a complicated relationship where a girl has power over him; he also compares the paparazzi to Nazis.

"Flashing Lights" was met with universal acclaim from music critics, who mostly praised the production. Some highlighted the synths in particular, while a few critics saw the song as a significant moment in hip-hop. It has since appeared on best-of lists from multiple publications, including Pitchfork's decade-end ranking for the 2000s. The song was one of the Award Winning Songs for the 2009 BMI R&B/Hip-Hop Awards. The song charted at number 29 on the US Billboard Hot 100, while reaching number 12 on the Hot R&B/Hip-Hop Songs chart. It also attained top 40 chart positions in Ireland, Turkey, and the United Kingdom, while peaking at number 54 in Canada. In the United States, the song received a sextuple platinum certification from the Recording Industry Association of America. It was also certified platinum in both Denmark and the UK by IFPI Danmark and the British Phonographic Industry, respectively.

An accompanying music video debuted on February 10, 2008. It stars model Rita G, who takes out her frustration on West by putting him in the trunk of her Ford Mustang and attacking him with a shovel. The visual received positive reviews from critics, and several praised the model's involvement. It won Best Narrative Video at the 2008 Antville Music Video Awards, and West called it his favorite video of his career in 2010. Two other music videos had been produced that West chose not to release, but they leaked online in May 2008. West performed the song on his Glow in the Dark Tour (2007–08), following a space opera storyline where he attempts to escape a planet devoid of creativity and fails. He also performed it at the Coachella and Splendour festivals in 2011. "Flashing Lights" has been used in numerous commercials, video games, and other songs. The song has been covered by Kids These Days in June 2012 and Lorde in September 2014; the latter's live performance received positive reviews from critics. The remix of the song was released in January 2008, featuring a verse from R. Kelly.

== Background ==
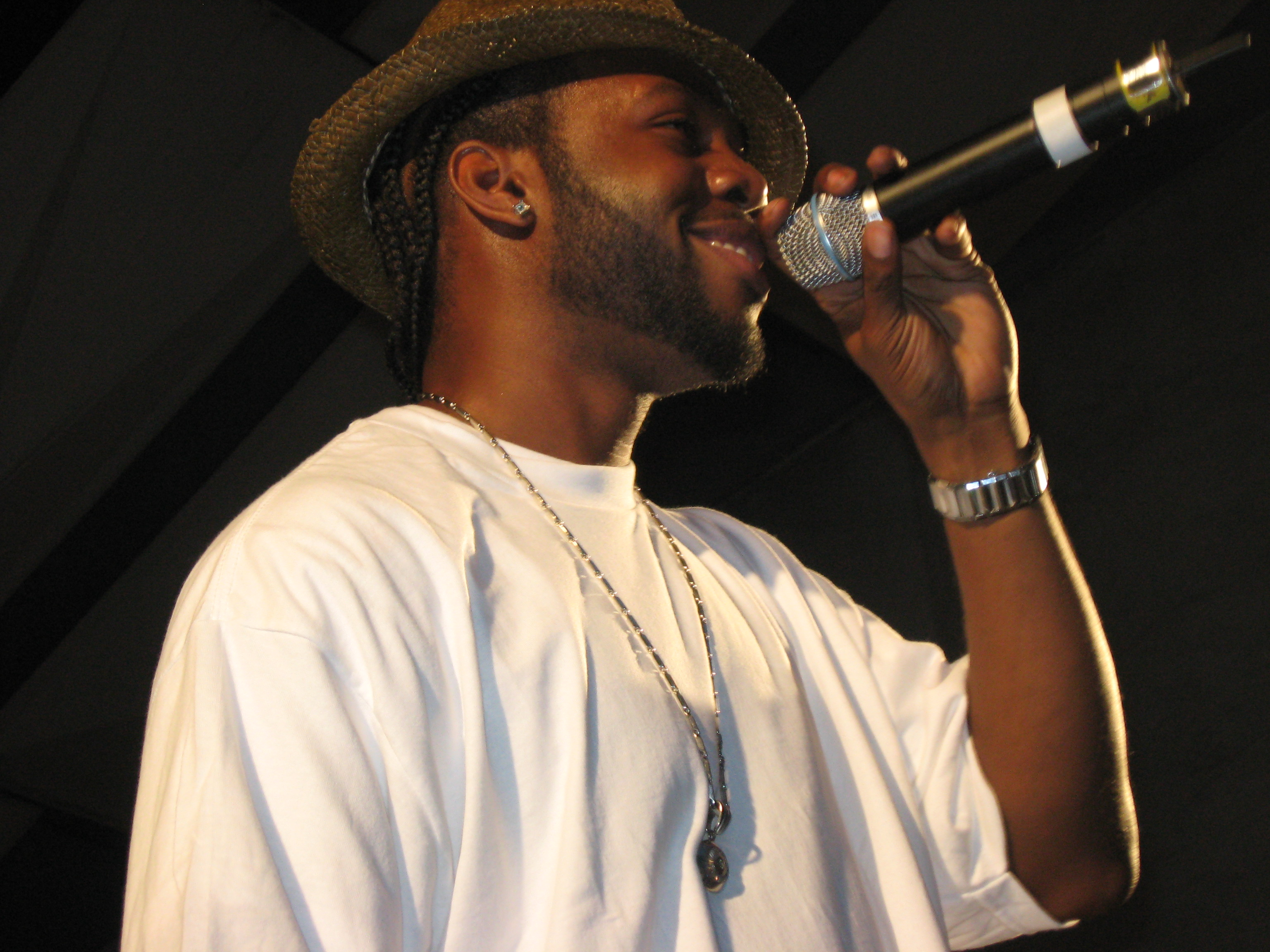
The song contains a guest appearance from Dwele, who first featured West on a 2004 remix of "Hold On".

Dwele first met West when the rapper appeared on a remix of his song "Hold On" in 2004. The two also worked on about four songs together in 2010, including West's single "Power". In June 2008, Eric Hudson, who co-wrote and produced "Flashing Lights" with West, recalled to XXL that he did not realize the song would "be as big as it was" until he listened to the "hot record" after release. Hudson felt great about the collaboration and joked that he wants to make 10 more songs like it, while he had completed the beat when he played it to West. The song's recording took place in 2007 and during the process, West added a live string section with Hudson over the synth strings. West wrote the lyrics the same night and Hudson's process began with the strings, then he used his MPC to sequence the drums and experimented with these elements alongside a loop, adding the bassline next that he saw as significant. Hudson later received more requests for collaborations from famous artists, who asked him for "the 'Flashing Lights' feel", which he tried to avoid since he did not want to duplicate his work on the song and become synonymous with a particular musical sound.

The song includes additional vocals from Connie Mitchell of Australian dance group Sneaky Sound System; the collaboration happened when West met Mitchell's bandmates Angus McDonald and Daimon Downey at a casual diner in Sydney. In need of musical inspiration, West asked McDonald for ideas, who responded by suggesting that he be introduced to Mitchell and he requested her to sing over a vocal track after they met. Mitchell thought the studio team held her to a low standard and McDonald considered the vocal track a challenging assignment, yet her vocals were included in the track. She contributed to six tracks on the album and acknowledged gaining recognition through working with West, after not having known who he was, and also became more interested in hip-hop.

"Flashing Lights" marked West's first instance of using a version of the term "light" in a song title and he continued to do so in future song titles. West references flashing lights directly on the former, similarly to how he referred to lights on the other releases. The cover art for the single was designed by Japanese artist Takashi Murakami. On the artwork, a girl is shown surrounded by flashing lights that also display the title and the names of the performing artists. Accompanying artwork for the album's other singles was also created by Murakami, alongside him overseeing the art direction of Graduation.

== Composition and lyrics ==
"Flashing Lights"
A 25-second sample of the opening verse to "Flashing Lights". The song's "stirring strings" and "jittering synths" are accompanied by "house-thump drums", orchestral instrumentation, and a chopped vocal sample intoning the song's title. West begins the verse by characterizing his lover's materialistic personality, narrating that she lacks interest in romance with a preference for shoes and cars over shooting stars.

Musically, "Flashing Lights" is a hip-hop, electro rap, and R&B song, with elements of Euro-club, French house, and pop music. The disco production was noted by numerous commentators, including Nathan Brackett of Rolling Stone, who compared it to hip-hop before the 1980s group Run-DMC. According to the sheet music on Musicnotes.com, the song is set in the time signature of common time. It is composed in the key of F♯ minor with a moderate tempo of 90 beats per minute and the vocal range spans a tenth, from C_{4} to E_{5}. The song relies on strings from the beginning, which were arranged by Larry Gold and described as moving by both Highsnobiety and Stylus Magazine. The strings are accompanied by drums and a bassline, while bright synths are included throughout. Staccato sounds and chopped-up vocal samples are incorporated, alongside the keys that are chopped too. An orchestra contributes violin, viola, and cello to the song.

In the lyrics of "Flashing Lights", West raps about a complicated relationship with a girl who holds power over him. He tells the tale of the lover's focus on materialism in the first verse, narrating how she prefers shoes and cars over shooting stars. West also acknowledges trying to bolster public opinion of him, which he links to the theme of press intrusion. He complains about being flashed by the paparazzi, asserting that he hates them more than Nazis. Following West's alleged antisemitism in November 2022, former associates of his noted in a letter to TheWrap that the context of the reference demonstrates his growing obsession with Adolf Hitler. The chorus is performed by Dwele, who questions: "But what do I know?" Afterwards, West narrates breaking up with his lover in the second verse, comparing how he felt to "Katrina with no FEMA". He fantasizes that she is on the opposite side of the glass in his memory's museum, equating her with Mona Lisa.

== Release and reception ==
West unveiled the track during a listening session for the album at Manhattan's New World Stages on August 28, 2007. On September 11, 2007, "Flashing Lights" was included as the ninth track on West's third studio album Graduation. West later shared the song as part six of the album's listening experience to his blog on April 4, 2008. The song was sent to US rhythmic contemporary radio stations as the album's fourth single on November 20, 2007, through West's labels Roc-A-Fella and Def Jam. It was later made available for digital download by the labels in various countries on January 1, 2008. Mercury released the song as a CD single in Japan on April 14, 2008, while a 12" vinyl was issued for it by West's labels in the United States on June 20.

"Flashing Lights" was met with universal acclaim from music critics, who often commended the production, particularly the synths. (Note: Reviewers include Digital Spy, PopMatters, RapReviews, and Stylus Magazine) At RapReviews, Jesal 'Jay Soul' Padania identified the song as a highlight of Graduation that prevents oblivion in its middle. Alex Fletcher of Digital Spy awarded the song four stars out of five, feeling confident that it proved "why West is the hottest property in US music at the moment" and noted how the electro and hip-hop elements are combined for "a sumptuous track that grows more intriguing with every listen". AllMusic's Andy Kellman noted that the bright synths may be "one of the most glaring deal-breakers in hip-hop history", while Stylus Magazine music reviewer Jayson Greene described the "gorgeously airy" track as "one of the most unabashedly graceful things" included on a mainstream rap record for years, with its "slithering house backbeat".

Some reviewers focused on other aspects of the production. Writing for Rolling Stone, Brackett stated that within the song, "West single-handedly takes hip-hop back to its pre-Run-DMC disco days." Mark Pytlik of Pitchfork named the song as an instant highlight that "marries a Bond-worthy coda to staccato sounds and cut-up vocal samples". In Billboard, Hillary Crosley was satisfied with the song for "reintroducing Miami Vice-esque keys". For Slant Magazine, Eric Henderson offered that it would be hard to find a campus library with enough depth to annotate the song and highlighted "the swooping drama queenery". In a less glowing review, Chet Betz of Cokemachineglow believed that it works off the production, which could have had a lot more impact due to "the glissando chop 'n key melds dazzling but suffering from a distinct lack of knock". Dorian Lynskey from The Guardian praised the strings for invoking Bernard Herrmann, yet found comparing the paparazzi to Nazis to be "simply imbecilic".

=== Accolades ===
"Flashing Lights" was listed as the 31st best song of 2007 by Stylus Magazine and received the same ranking on a list by Idolator; jharv wrote that he felt more comfortable with the disco style as a "Kanye-matchmaking hook-up between hip-hop and techno" than fellow Graduation single "Stronger". It was voted joint 70th on The Village Voice's Pazz & Jop poll for that year, earning seven mentions. The song was listed at number 13 on "The 100 Best Tracks of 2008" list by Pitchfork, whose Tom Breihan described it as "a tweak on pop conventions evocative enough that its sticky bad feelings will linger on" until the relief of having been forgotten can be held, comparing it to Flo Rida's 2007 track "Low". MTV named the song the second best hip-hop single of 2008. At the 2009 BMI R&B/Hip-Hop Awards, "Flashing Lights" was one of the Award Winning Songs.

"Flashing Lights" was cited as the 52nd best song of the 2000s decade by Pitchfork in 2009; Ryan Dombal called it "classic Kanye-- self-possessed, superfluously art-ridden, probably too clever by half" and said in his "post-everything museum, da Vinci sidles up next to a bust of Julius; a Karen O-repping blog post follows one dedicated to 10-ft. tall 'Chewing Gum Sculptures'", and French house music is combined with stadium rap. Complex named "Flashing Lights" the sixth best song of their decade, which ran from when the magazine founded in 2002 up to 2012. A year later, it was voted as West's fourth best song in a poll of Rolling Stone readers. In 2018, Complex listed the song as West's sixth best release, with writers for the magazine affirming he was correct to rap about flashing lights after continuous experiences with them on "this electronic-tinged monster". Highsnobiety crowned it as West's second best song five years later; Donov Barnett noted the full presence of "the best elements of a classic Ye song" in the strings, "archetypal bars about luxury and lust", and the hook.

== Music videos ==
=== Official music video ===
In January 2008, West announced a music video for "Flashing Lights" at the American Museum of Natural History in New York City (NYC). The official music video was unveiled before an audience of 200 guests at the Entertainment Weekly after-party for the 2008 Grammy Awards on February 10, projected on a large wall. It was intended to premiere on BET on February 13, 2008, but was subsequently pulled from schedule. At the premiere, West felt like "a brand-new artist that just signed yesterday" and expressed that every aspect of the video "is me, what I represent now". He also posted the video on his blog the same day. The video was co-directed by Spike Jonze with West himself, with Susan Linss serving as executive producer and production also contributed by Jonathan Becker.

Model Rita G stated that she was contacted to collaborate by West, who had mentioned her previously in a Playboy interview and she flew to the set of the music video. The model found the set to be sparse and only saw West with two female wardrobe stylists; he picked her outfit with accessories and envisioned her role. Shooting of the video took under four hours and Rita G mentioned continuous changes in the lead-up, expressing that all she knew was West maintained at the time when their contrast was him with "five levels of clothes on shivering, me naked". She thought it was entertaining how the video "will go over a lot of people's heads — and it's supposed to", describing West as ahead of his time in a way that others would not understand.

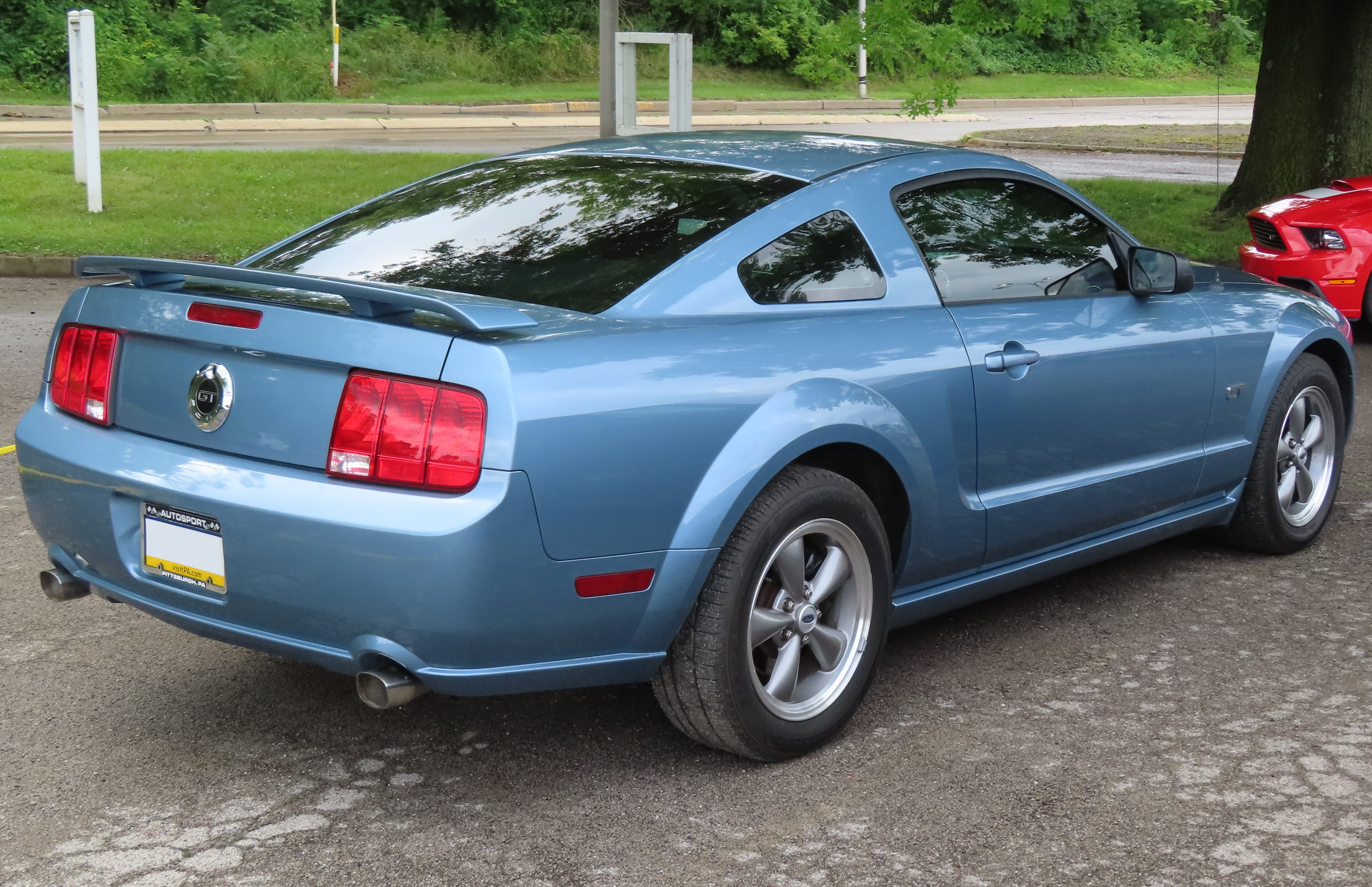
Rita G drives a damaged Ford Mustang car in the song's music video, trapping West in the trunk and assaulting him.

The music video is shown in slow motion and set in an empty Nevada desert, beginning with Rita G arriving in a damaged Ford Mustang and getting out the car. She walks a few yards then takes her fur coat off and sets it alight, leaving her in lingerie. Rita G re-approaches her car and unveils the trunk, where West is bound-and-gagged, following a storyline of her taking out her frustrations harshly on him. She behaves in a loving manner towards West and takes a shovel from the trunk, using this to attack him. Evidence is burned by Rita G and after the assault, the camera pans out as the scene abruptly cuts to the words "Flashing Lights" against a black screen, ending earlier than the song's runtime.

==== Reception and legacy ====
Simon Vozick-Levinson from Entertainment Weekly saw the music video as "yet another fantastic voyage" into West's internal darkness, finding it to be more outgoing than other popular artists' videos and "some sort of metaphoric self-punishment for the standard rap-video objectification of the female character's body". VideoStatic's Steven Gottlieb questioned if the visual was West's version of the 1953 play Waiting for Godot or a prank; he similarly believed it will both confound and enrapture, assuring to simply appreciate the story with Rita G and the rapper. noah of Idolator felt that the closure of the shovel assault is not the real ending and while this "looks gorgeous", the clip seemingly "has to be some sort of attempt to bring serialization" to music videos.

The clip was voted as the 11th best video of 2008 by readers of Rolling Stone. Pitchfork listed the visual as the 15th best music video of the 2000s decade. Slant Magazine named it the 17th best music video of the decade, with a writer noting the "glorious, slow-motion tracking shot" and that the "fetishized violence" is better than any of Quentin Tarantino's work. In 2016, Billboard identified the video as West's third best visual and Dan Weiss said in comparison to the song, the "desolate clip is appropriately barren and haunting to match". Weiss highlighted the scenes with West and Rita G, concluding the music video is both "a self-deprecating fever dream" and one of his "disturbing conflations of sex and death" that foresaw "the beautiful dark twisted fantasies to come". The music video was awarded Best Narrative Video at the 2008 Antville Music Video Awards, where it was also nominated for Best Urban Video. At the 2008 HipHopDX Awards, it received a nomination for Video of the Year. By November 19, 2015, the music video had amassed over 41 million views on YouTube.

On August 6, 2010, West named the music video as his favorite of his career. On November 19, 2015, I Can't Even Productions shared a remake of the video using footage from the 2013 video game Grand Theft Auto V, edited with Premiere and Rockstar Video Editor. It copies the original with slight alterations, including the female protagonist destroying the car with a rocket launcher.

=== Alternate music videos ===
On May 24, 2008, the second music video that was recorded leaked online. Stop motion was handled by Bill Pollock for the visual, which casts British model Charlotte Carter-Allen. She becomes overwhelmed with the lifestyle, flashing lights, and nightlife of NYC, including her having breakfast at 3 a.m. and smoking cigarettes. Carter-Allen and West make out to the Police's "Wrapped Around Your Finger" (1983), before her purse is stolen when she gets drunk. The model then travels home alone on the NYC Subway, while West looks on at her as he is surrounded by mist. On May 29, 2008, the first music video experienced a leak, set at a dinner party in a haunted house. The video resembles a murder mystery and shows West eat soup, follow a female servant's chalk line, and float upwards after being thrown from a window.

Following the releases, West clarified on his blog he did not release the two videos. He wrote that he shot the official clip with Jonze after not liking these videos, noting his Glow in the Dark Tour collaborator Sam i handled a remix of "the scary one 2 make [sic] the music fit" as he planned to share on a DVD. West insisted that rather than a rant, he was offering justification "of why yall [sic] getting those other vids" without his approval nor any release and concluded whoever did the leaks will only receive attention for them. Upon release, the first version was listed at number two on The Guardian's Viral Video Chart on May 30, 2008.

== Commercial performance ==
Prior to its release as a single, "Flashing Lights" reached number 12 on the US Billboard Bubbling Under Hot R&B/Hip-Hop Songs chart. The song debuted at number 61 on the US Hot R&B/Hip-Hop Songs for the chart week of November 10, 2007. The next week, the song moved down to number 62. It rebounded to number 47 on the chart issue dated November 24, 2007. Around a month later, on December 29, the song peaked at number 12 on the Hot R&B/Hip-Hop Songs chart. The song reached this position again on the chart issue dated February 2, 2008, remaining there for two consecutive weeks. "Flashing Lights" entered the US Hot Rap Songs chart at number 25 on the issue dated November 11, 2007, where it stayed for two weeks. By the issue dated January 26, 2008, the song had climbed up to peak at the chart's third position.

"Flashing Lights" first appeared on the US Billboard Bubbling Under Hot 100 chart at number 22 for the issue date of November 24, 2007. The next week, the song climbed 19 places in its last week on the chart. "Flashing Lights" debuted at number 75 on the Billboard Hot 100, marking the highest entry for the week of November 29, 2007. After three weeks on the chart, the song had climbed to number 50. Within two weeks, it had reached number 36. On the Hot 100 issue date of January 12, 2008, "Flashing Lights" descended to number 49. The song experienced a rebound the next week, rising 14 spaces. The song then rose further on the Hot 100, reaching number 30. "Flashing Lights" peaked at the number 29 spot on the issue date of February 2, 2008, spending a total of 20 weeks on the chart. At the end of 2008, the song was ranked as the 90th most popular release on the Hot 100. On August 22, 2023, "Flashing Lights" was awarded a sixtuple platinum certification from the Recording Industry Association of America (RIAA) for amassing 6,000,000 certified units in the US.

In Canada, the song debuted at number 88 on the Canadian Hot 100 issue dated February 23, 2008. The next week, it climbed to number 67. On March 8, 2008, "Flashing Lights" peaked at number 54 on the chart. In Europe, the song experienced its strongest performance, reaching number 11 on the Billboard Turkey Türkiye Top 20. In Ireland, the song reached number 21 on the Irish Singles Chart. It charted similarly in the UK, peaking at number 29 on the UK Singles Chart. The song lasted for 15 weeks on the chart and as of October 24, 2019, it stands as West's 28th biggest hit of all time in the UK. On November 4, 2022, "Flashing Lights" received a platinum certification from the British Phonographic Industry (BPI) for totalling 600,000 units in the country. The song was awarded the same certification by IFPI Danmark for shipments of 90,000 units in Denmark on March 20, 2024.

== Live performances ==
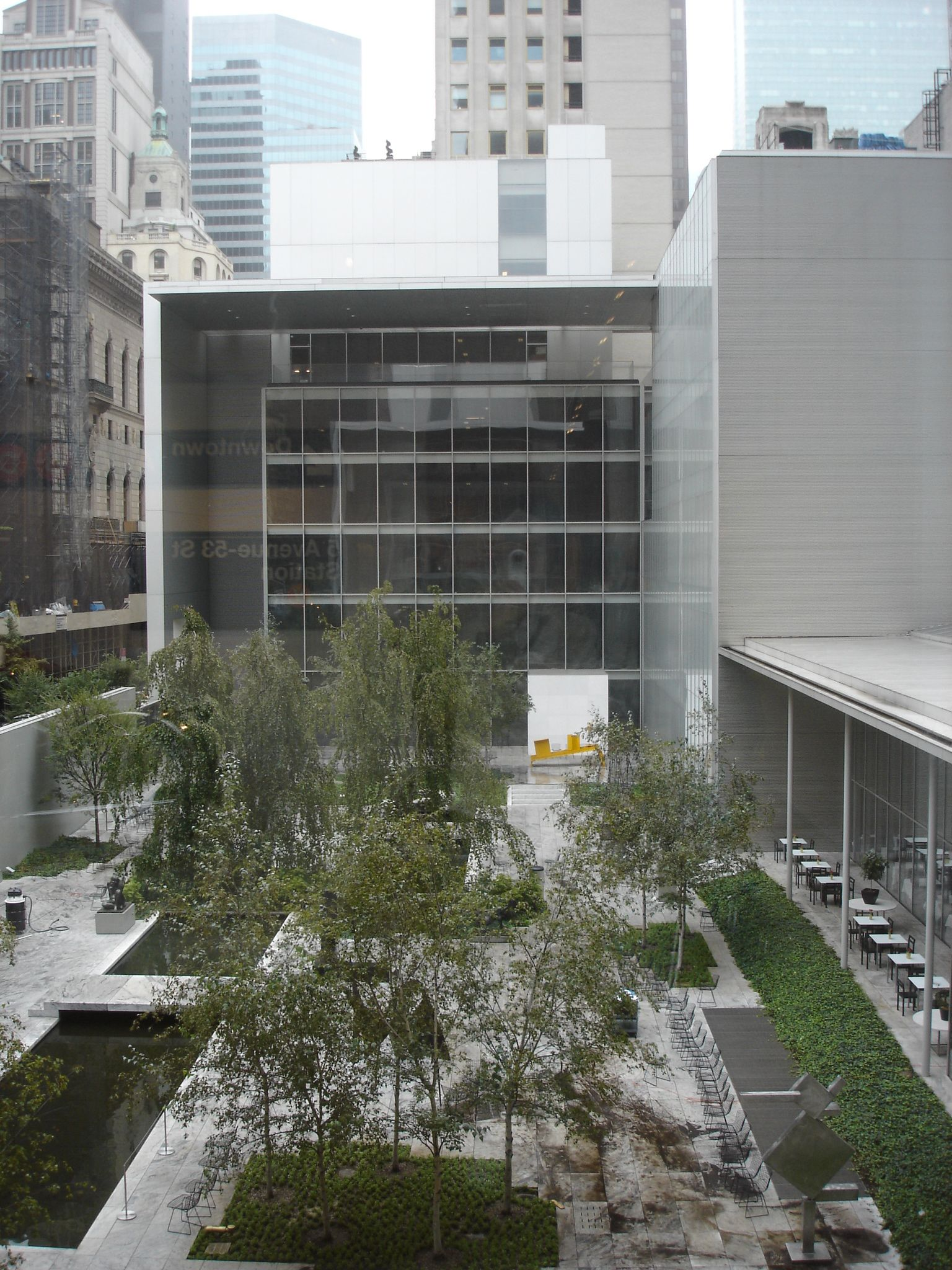
The Museum of Modern Art in New York City, where West performed a medley including the song in May 2011.

West was a surprise appearance at a concert held by Kid Sister on January 25, 2008, where he performed "Can't Tell Me Nothing," "Good Life" and "Flashing Lights". He performed "Flashing Lights" live for the opening of Murakami's exhibit at the Brooklyn Museum on April 4, accompanied by blue lights. He included "Flashing Lights" within the setlist of his Glow in the Dark Tour (2007-08). In the space opera storyline of the conceptual concert, West attempts to escape from a planet devoid of creativity with a talking computer named Jane by using the shooting stars mentioned in the song. However, the plan fails and the ship plummets from the sky, crashing back to the ground to the tune of "All Falls Down". West walked across the stage and performed the song during the final night of Lollapalooza 2008 during August, which he co-headlined in his hometown of Chicago. That same month, West played "Flashing Lights" at the Exdo Event Center in Denver for a private show held for Bono's humanitarian organization One. During his performance, he produced a freestyle that included improvised lines touching on Democratic presidential candidate Barack Obama and his late mother. West performed the song during his appearance at the Knitting Factory in NYC on September 9, 2008.

West and a backing band provided a live rendition of "Flashing Lights" in February 2009 for his live album VH1 Storytellers (2010), featuring him apologizing for initially not revealing information and then alluding to the death of his mother. "Flashing Lights" was performed while West headlined the Met Gala on May 5, 2009. West performed the song for his headlining set at the 2011 Coachella Festival. In May of this year, he performed it as part of a song medley at the annual party in the Garden for NYC's Museum of Modern Art, wearing a gray sweatshirt with a hood, a white T-shirt, light blue jeans, and black sneakers. On July 29, 2011, West performed the song for his headlining set at the Australian festival Splendour in the Grass. West delivered a faithful take on the song at the 2013 Governors Ball, with backing from a modest DJ setup. On October 19, 2013, West moved from a performance of the song into one of his 2010 single "All of the Lights" towards the end of his kickoff show on The Yeezus Tour (2013-14) in Seattle, performing from atop a mountain. For Big Boy's 92.3 FM show in Los Angeles on June 3, 2016, West rapped the song on karaoke.

West performed "Flashing Lights" from a flying stage at downtown Indianapolis' Gainbridge Fieldhouse for the Saint Pablo Tour's kickoff show on August 25, 2016. During a stop at Madison Square Garden in NYC for the tour on September 5, he transitioned from a performance of the song into one of his 2016 track "Highlights". West performed the song for the wedding of D'Estree founder Geraldine Guiotte and Tiffany & Co. Executive Vice President Alexander Arnault in Venice on October 16, 2021, with a black mask obscuring his face. On December 10, West delivered a performance of the song for a benefit concert with Drake at the Los Angeles Memorial Coliseum for Larry Hoover's jail sentence.

== Remixes ==
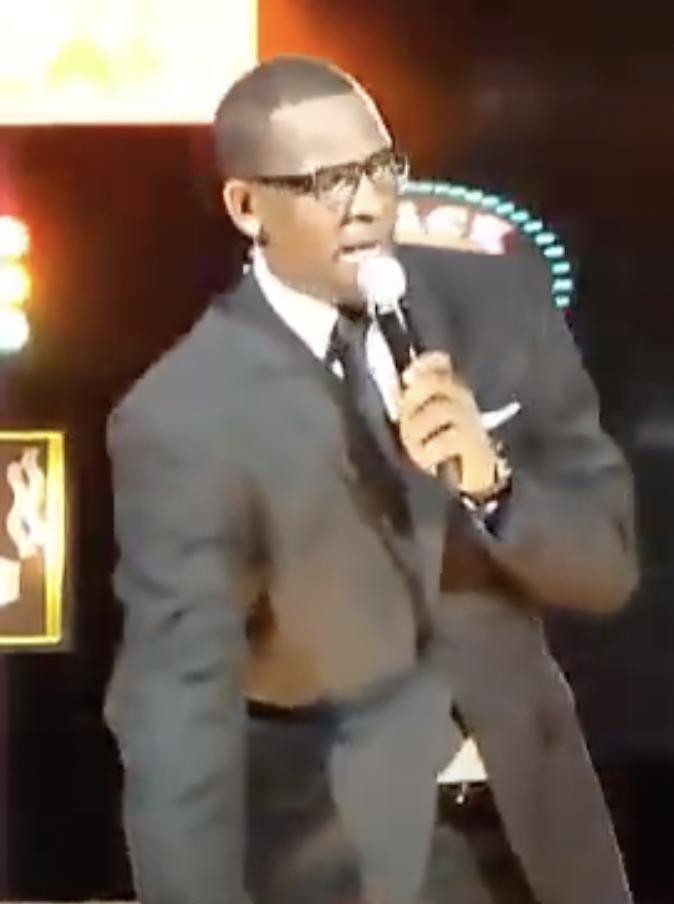
The official remix of the song features a verse from R. Kelly

In September 2007, hip-hop duo Clipse shared their remix of "Flashing Lights". On January 18, 2008, the song's official remix was released, featuring R&B singer R. Kelly. The remix features no new verses from West, only adding a verse from R. Kelly. The singer assures that any violations of the law are non-narcotic, outside of his weed usage. He also encourages, "Stand up and be accountable."

Devin of Rap-Up considered after R. Kelly's call for accountability that the singer "should take his own advice". Idolator's Jess Harvell saw R. Kelly's verse on the remix as low effort, feeling that referencing his non-narcotic behaviour is the only highlight of "a mixtape-worthy-but-little-more guest spot" in the "Romulus-transfusion" and it merely extends the song's lifespan longer. The staff of The Fader admitted to hoping that the singer will appear on remixes of songs "until the end of time". The remix was placed on MTV's "'Hood's Heavy Rotation: Bubbling Below The Radar" list for the week of January 29, 2008. On November 30, 2010, singer Charlie Wilson posted a video to YouTube of him and West working in the studio with collaborators on an alternate version of "Flashing Lights", featuring the rapper delivering lines about "running from the flashing lights".

In 2008, Canadian indie pop musician Colin Munroe remixed the song under title of "I Want Those Flashing Lights", posting a music video on YouTube. Monroe decided to record the remix after the original stood out on Graduation in a manner that brought out his creative spirit, wanting to experiment and see if he could do something different. He expressed that the experiment went overboard and he "didn't really expect it to turn into what it", yet felt positive about the attention. Munroe shot the music video with a friend from a local art school, setting out to innovate against big budget storylines. The video went viral and caught the attention of West, who posted it to his blog.

== In popular culture ==
Styles P released a freestyle over the song's instrumental on October 10, 2007. "Flashing Lights" was included on the compilation album Now That's What I Call Music 27, released on March 11, 2008. Later that year, the song was included as part of the Grand Theft Auto IV in-game radio station The Beat 102.7. On the station, DJ Mister Cee introduces it as a song that will not stop being played despite people being fed up. In January 2009, it was used in an FX advert for the sixth season of Nip/Tuck. A month later, the song was set to be included within the setlist of the turntable music video game Scratch: The Ultimate DJ, which ultimately went unreleased.

In February 2010, Gil Scott-Heron sampled the string loop from the song on both parts of his poem "On Coming from a Broken Home". Later that year, "Flashing Lights" was featured in a Yahoo! commercial. A remix of singer Beyoncé's single "Drunk in Love" that features Jay-Z was released on February 14, 2014, with a guest verse from West. The remix samples the song's titular phrase, after Beyoncé sings about flashing lights. "Flashing Lights" was used during a scene in the 2016 animated film Sing. It was played as a portrait was displayed of Charlize Theron in a 2018 J'Adore television commercial, titled: The New Absolu: The Film. In September 2021, West collaborator and British producer Hudson Mohawke named the song as his fourth favorite from West, while British rapper Tinie Tempah placed it at number three on his list. On October 7, 2022, American rapper G Herbo interpolated the song on "Flashbacks" for his album Survivor's Remorse.

== Cover versions ==
A HBCU Marching Band delivered a performance of "Flashing Lights" at the Georgia Dome Battle of the Bands on January 26, 2008, which West shared to his blog. On June 22, 2012, hip-hop band Kids These Days released a revamped cover version of the song with live instrumentation. The cover adds new lyrics, delivered by the lead rapper Vic Mensa. An accompanying music video was shared by the band on June 29, 2012, depicting a dark setting with flashing lights that change colors throughout.

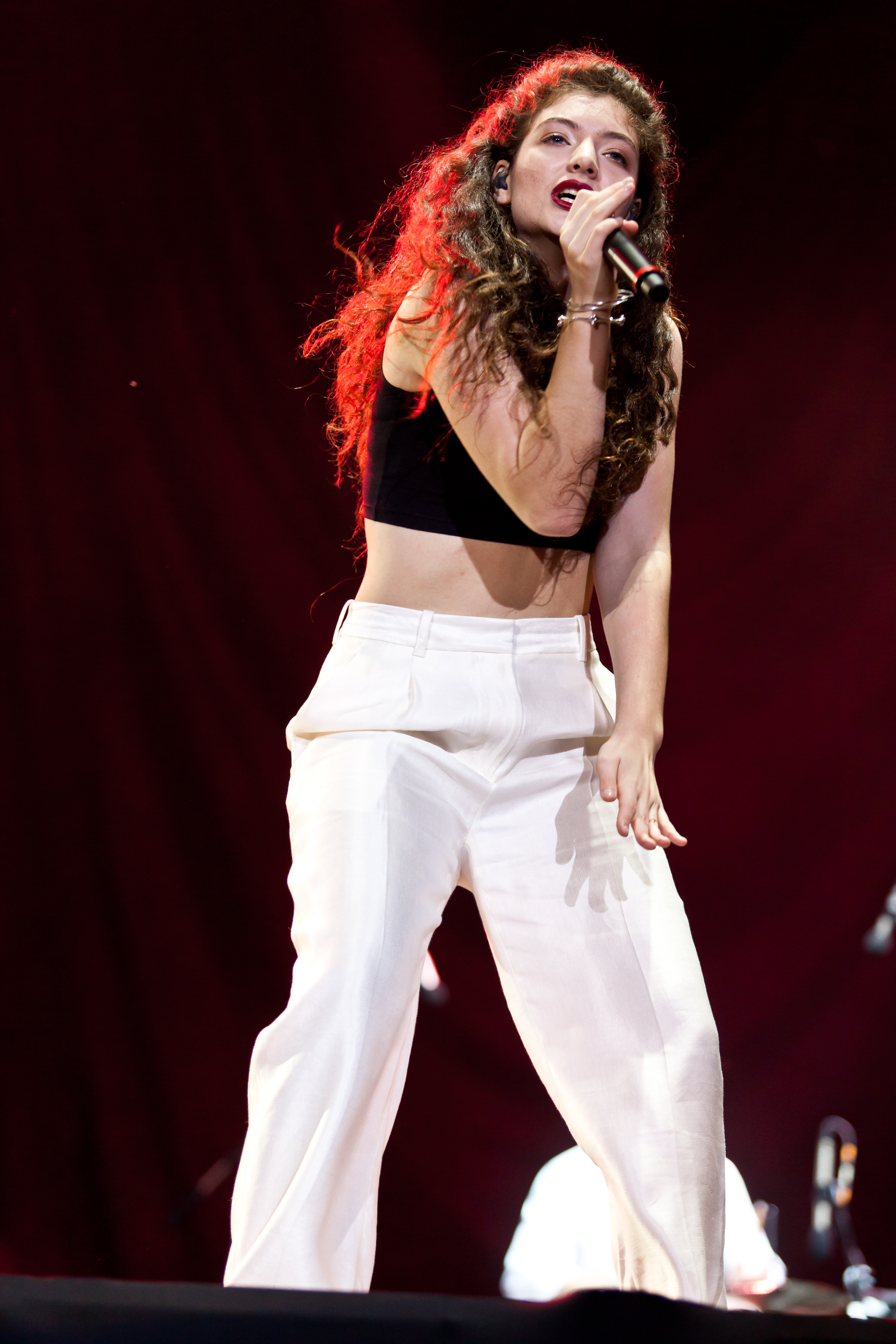
At a 2014 concert on her Pure Heroine Tour, Lorde delivered a performance of the song, which was well-received by critics, who highlighted her creativity.

On September 5, 2014, New Zealand singer-songwriter Lorde performed a short rendition of "Flashing Lights" at her first concert in Philadelphia on the Pure Heroine Tour (2013–14), which included her crooning. Lorde set a gothic theme for the performance, where she wore a full-length white hooded coat. The cover combines alt-rock, pop, and hip-hop, accompanying synths and strings. For Slate, Sharan Shetty wrote that Lorde delivered "a short, thrilling rendition". Carolyn Menyes from Music Times opined that the singer merged "her world of alt-rock, pop and hip-hop with an oddly sensual and straightforward take" on the song. On a similar note at Rolling Stone, Ryan Reed commented that Lorde made the song suit her "gothic electro-pop wheelhouse" as she delivered "her seductive croon". On a 2021 list of her best cover songs, Ali Shutler from NME said that the rendition "proved there was more to Lorde" than had been seen previously.

On February 8, 2016, French electronic collective Point Point reinterpreted the song with their ballad "F+L". The ballad begins with strings setting a darker tone, which progress to synths and elements of French house. Hip-hop elements are incorporated too and towards the end, the strings re-appear. In 2020, Italian band Studio Murena released a cover version of the song. The cover was arranged by BadBadNotGood and attracted the attention of other Italian artists.

== Track listing ==
Digital single

1. "Flashing Lights" – 3:57

UK CD single

1. "Flashing Lights" – 3:57
2. "Stronger" (Andrew Dawson remix) – 4:45

UK 12" single

1. "Flashing Lights" – 3:57
2. "Flashing Lights" (instrumental) – 3:57
3. "Stronger" (Andrew Dawson remix) – 4:45

== Credits and personnel ==
Information taken from Graduation liner notes.

Recording

- Recorded at Chalice Studios (Los Angeles, CA) and Chung King Studios (NYC)
- Mixed at Chung King Studios (NYC)

Personnel

- Kanye West – songwriter, producer
- Eric Hudson – songwriter, producer, other instruments
- Andrew Dawson – recorder, mix engineer
- Anthony Kilhoffer – recorder
- Matty Green – assistant mix engineer
- Anthony Palazzole – assistant mix engineer
- Andy Marcinkowski – assistant mix engineer
- Emma Kummrow – violin
- Igor Szwec – violin
- Gloria Justen – violin
- Olga Konopelsky – violin
- Luigi Mazzocchi – violin
- Charles Parker – violin
- Peter Nocella – viola
- Alexandra Leem – viola
- Jennie Lorenzo – cello
- Tim Ressler – bass
- Larry Gold – string arranger, conductor
- Connie Mitchell – additional vocals

== Charts ==
=== Weekly charts ===
Chart performance for "Flashing Lights"
Chart (2007–2008)	Peak position
Australia (ARIA)	82
Belgium (Ultratip Bubbling Under Flanders)	5
Belgium (Ultratip Bubbling Under Wallonia)	19
Canada Hot 100 (Billboard)	54
European Hot 100 Singles (Billboard)	84
Ireland (IRMA)	21
Turkey (Billboard Türkiye)	11
UK Singles (Official Charts)	29
UK Hip Hop/R&B (Official Charts)	6
US Billboard Hot 100	29
US Hot R&B/Hip-Hop Songs (Billboard)	12
US Hot Rap Songs (Billboard)	2
US Pop Airplay (Billboard)	31
US Pop 100 (Billboard)	40
US Rhythmic Airplay (Billboard)	8

Chart performance for "Flashing Lights"
Chart (2018)	Peak position
France Downloads (SNEP)	70

Chart performance for "Flashing Lights"
Chart (2024–2026)	Peak position
Global 200 (Billboard)	135
Greece International (IFPI)	86
Lithuania (AGATA)	54
Netherlands (Single Tip)	6
UK Hip Hop/R&B (OCC)	22

=== Year-end charts ===
2008 year-end chart performance for "Flashing Lights"
Chart (2008)	Position
UK Singles (OCC)	197
US Billboard Hot 100	90
US Hot R&B/Hip-Hop Songs (Billboard)	48
US Hot Rap Songs (Billboard)	15

== Certifications ==
Certifications for "Flashing Lights"
Region	Certification	Certified units/sales
Denmark (IFPI Danmark)	Platinum	90,000^{‡}
Germany (BVMI)	Gold	300,000^{‡}
Italy (FIMI)	Gold	50,000^{‡}
New Zealand (RMNZ)	4× Platinum	120,000^{‡}
Spain (Promusicae)	Gold	30,000^{‡}
United Kingdom (BPI)	2× Platinum	1,200,000^{‡}
United States (RIAA)	9× Platinum	9,000,000^{‡}
Streaming
Greece (IFPI Greece)	2× Platinum	4,000,000^{†}
^{‡} Sales+streaming figures based on certification alone.^{†} Streaming-only figures based on certification alone.

== Release history ==
Release dates and formats for "Flashing Lights"
Region	Date	Format	Label(s)	Ref.
United States	November 20, 2007	Rhythmic contemporary radio	Roc-A-Fella; Def Jam	
Various	January 1, 2008	Digital download	Roc-A-Fella; Def Jam	
Japan	April 14, 2008	CD single	Mercury	
United States	June 20, 2008	12" vinyl	Roc-A-Fella; Def Jam	
