= Desiigner discography =

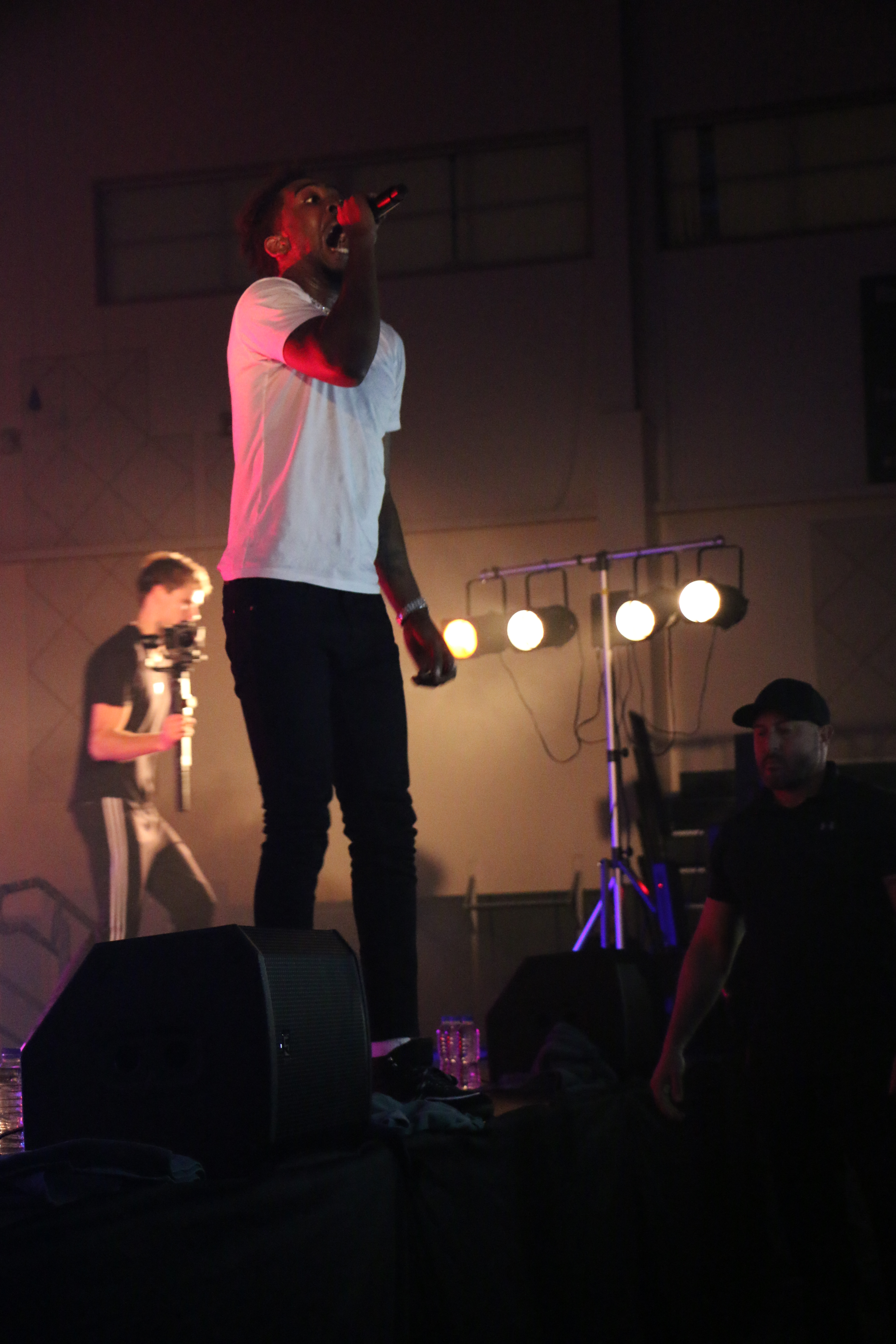
- Desiigner performing at Camp Humphreys, November 2019
- Studio albums: 1
- EPs: 3
- Singles: 37
- Music videos: 8
- Mixtapes: 1

American rapper Desiigner has released one studio album, one mixtape, three EPs, 21 singles (including 13 as a featured artist), 8 music videos (including 4 as a featured performer).

On December 15, 2015, Desiigner released his commercial debut single, titled "Panda" on SoundCloud, which later reached number one on the US Billboard Hot 100. In 2016, the Brooklyn rapper signed a recording contract with Kanye West's GOOD Music, under the aegis of Def Jam Recordings. He released an EP in 2018 titled "LOD" (acronym for Life Of Desiigner) which was his second and final project with GOOD/Def Jam.

== Studio albums ==
Studio albums, with selected details
Title	Album details
ii	Released: August 1, 2025; Label: LOD Records; Format: Digital download, streaming

== EPs ==
Extended play, with details
Title	EP details	Peak chart positions
Title	EP details	US
L.O.D.	Released: May 4, 2018; Label: GOOD, Def Jam; Formats: Digital download	161
Diamonds Forever	Released: July 31, 2020; Label: LOD Records; Formats: Digital download	—
3 the Hard Way	Released: August 13, 2021; Label: LOD Records; Formats: Digital download	—
"—" denotes a recording that did not chart or was not released in that territory.

== Mixtapes ==
List of mixtapes, with details and peak chart positions
Title	Album details	Peak chart positions			
Title	Album details	US	US R&B/HH	US Rap	CAN
New English	Released: June 26, 2016; Label: GOOD, Def Jam; Format: Digital download	22	14	8	33

== Singles ==
=== As lead artist ===
List of singles as lead artist, with selected chart positions, showing year released and album name.
Title	Year	Peak chart positions										Certifications	Album:
Title	Year	US	US R&B/HH	US Rap	AUS	CAN	DEN	FRA	NZ	SWE	UK	Certifications	Album:
"Panda"	2015	1	1	1	7	4	10	19	4	11	7	RIAA: 5× Platinum; ARIA: 5× Platinum; BPI: 2× Platinum; GLF: 3× Platinum; IFPI DEN: 2× Platinum; MC: 4× Platinum; RMNZ: 4× Platinum; SNEP: Diamond	New English
"Champions" (with Kanye West, Gucci Mane, Big Sean, 2 Chainz, Travis Scott, Yo Gotti and Quavo)	2016	71	22	15	—	73	—	—	—	—	128	RIAA: Platinum; BPI: Silver; IFPI DEN: Gold	Non-album singles
"Tiimmy Turner"	2016	34	10	6	—	38	—	174	— (Note: "Tiimmy Turner" did not enter the NZ Top 40 Singles Chart, but peaked at number seven on the NZ Heatseekers chart.)	—	136	RIAA: Platinum; BPI: Silver; IFPI DEN: Gold; RMNZ: Gold; SNEP: Gold	Non-album singles
"Outlet"	2017	— (Note: "Outlet" did not enter the Billboard Hot 100, but peaked at number five on the Bubbling Under Hot 100 Singles chart.)	48	—	—	86	—	—	—	—	—		Non-album singles
"Holy Ghost"	2017	—	—	—	—	—	—	—	—	—	—		Non-album singles
"Thank God I Got It" (featuring Mitus)	2017	—	—	—	—	—	—	—	—	—	—		Non-album singles
"Up"	2017	—	—	—	—	—	—	—	—	—	—		Non-album singles
"Liife" (featuring Gucci Mane)	2017	—	—	—	—	—	—	—	— (Note: "Liife" did not enter the NZ Top 40 Singles Chart, but peaked at number 10 on the NZ Heatseekers Singles Chart.)	—	—		Non-album singles
"Shoot"	2018	—	—	—	—	—	—	—	—	—	—		Non-album singles
"Overseas" (featuring Lil Pump)	2018	—	—	—	—	—	—	—	—	—	—		Non-album singles
"Diva"	2020	—	—	—	—	—	—	—	—	—	—		Non-album singles
"Survivor"	2020	—	—	—	—	—	—	—	—	—	—		Non-album singles
"Hate Me Now (Freestyle)"	2020	—	—	—	—	—	—	—	—	—	—		Non-album singles
"Molly"	2020	—	—	—	—	—	—	—	—	—	—		Non-album singles
"Amen"	2021	—	—	—	—	—	—	—	—	—	—		Non-album singles
"GLE"	2021	—	—	—	—	—	—	—	—	—	—		Non-album singles
"I Get That"	2021	—	—	—	—	—	—	—	—	—	—		Non-album singles
"Bakin" (with Slushii and DJ Whoo Kid)	2022	—	—	—	—	—	—	—	—	—	—		Non-album singles
"Put Her On" (with Tank God)	2022	—	—	—	—	—	—	—	—	—	—		Non-album singles
"Move How We Move"	2022	—	—	—	—	—	—	—	—	—	—		Non-album singles
"Mobb Ties" (with MVW)	2022	—	—	—	—	—	—	—	—	—	—		Non-album singles
"Jaguar"	2022	—	—	—	—	—	—	—	—	—	—		Non-album singles
"Star in the Room"	2022	—	—	—	—	—	—	—	—	—	—		Non-album singles
"My Brodie"	2022	—	—	—	—	—	—	—	—	—	—		Non-album singles
"Kilo" (with Slim Jxmmi)	2022	—	—	—	—	—	—	—	—	—	—		Non-album singles
"Bigger and Bigger"	2022	—	—	—	—	—	—	—	—	—	—		Non-album singles
"Two in One"	2023	—	—	—	—	—	—	—	—	—	—		Non-album singles
"PMR" (featuring A Boogie wit da Hoodie)	2023	—	—	—	—	—	—	—	—	—	—		Non-album singles
"Tiimmy Turner 2"	2023	—	—	—	—	—	—	—	—	—	—		Rebirth
"Mafia Water"	2023	—	—	—	—	—	—	—	—	—	—		Non-album singles
"Young N Ballin"	2023	—	—	—	—	—	—	—	—	—	—		Non-album singles
"Monster"	2023	—	—	—	—	—	—	—	—	—	—		Non-album singles
"FUKIT"	2024	—	—	—	—	—	—	—	—	—	—		Non-album singles
"Back to Biz"	2024	—	—	—	—	—	—	—	—	—	—		Non-album singles
"Rolls Truck"	2024	—	—	—	—	—	—	—	—	—	—		Non-album singles
"Drip Check"	2024	—	—	—	—	—	—	—	—	—	—		Non-album singles
"Big Dawg"	2024	—	—	—	—	—	—	—	—	—	—		Non-album singles
"Hollywood" (with Jarren Benton)	2024	—	—	—	—	—	—	—	—	—	—		Non-album singles
"In My Section"	2024	—	—	—	—	—	—	—	—	—	—		Non-album singles
"Shyio"	2024	—	—	—	—	—	—	—	—	—	—		Rebirth
"Champion"	2024	—	—	—	—	—	—	—	—	—	—		Rebirth
"World"	2024	—	—	—	—	—	—	—	—	—	—		Rebirth
"Way of Life"	2024	—	—	—	—	—	—	—	—	—	—		Non-album singles
"Love Is a Drug"	2025	—	—	—	—	—	—	—	—	—	—		Non-album singles
"—" denotes a recording that did not chart or was not released in that territory.

=== As featured artist ===
List of singles as a featured artist, with selected chart positions, showing year released and album name.
Title	Year	Peak chart positions						Certifications	Album:
Title	Year	US	AUS	CAN	FRA	IRE	UK	Certifications	Album:
"Strapped & Ready" (Rah Smooth featuring Desiigner, Money and Loopy)	2016	—	—	—	—	—	—		Non-album single
"Finesse" (Jim Jones featuring Rich Homie Quan, ASAP Ferg and Desiigner)	2016	—	—	—	—	—	—		The Kitchen
"On the Low" (Phresher featuring Desiigner)	2016	—	—	—	—	—	—		Non-album singles
"Danny DeVito" (Phresher featuring Desiigner and Rowdy Rebel)	2016	—	—	—	—	—	—		Non-album singles
"Murder Murder" (Mekado featuring Desiigner)	2016	—	—	—	—	—	—		Non-album singles
"New Beamer" (Mekado featuring Desiigner)	2016	—	—	—	—	—	—		Loopy Season
"Circles" (Pusha T featuring Ty Dolla Sign and Desiigner)	2016	—	—	—	—	—	—		Non-album singles
"The Song of the Summer" (Seven Bucks featuring Logan Paul, Desiigner and David Hasselhoff)	2017	—	—	—	—	—	—		Non-album singles
"All Around the World" (Mura Masa featuring Desiigner)	2017	—	—	—	—	—	—		Mura Masa
"Up Next" (16yrold featuring Desiigner and Ski Mask the Slump God)	2017	—	—	—	—	—	—		Non-album singles
"Durbaan Ka Ii Tuma" (Waayaha Cusub featuring Desiigner)	2017	—	—	—	—	—	—		Non-album singles
"Mic Drop (Remix)" (BTS featuring Desiigner; Steve Aoki remix)	2017	28	50	37	33	98	46	ARIA: Gold	Love Yourself 承 'Her'
"Loud" (Silk City featuring GoldLink and Desiigner)	2018	—	—	—	—	—	—		Electricity
"Drip" (Dillon Francis and Boombox Cartel featuring Desiigner)	2019	—	—	—	—	—	—		Non-album singles
"Maui" (Blac Chyna featuring Desiigner)	2021	—	—	—	—	—	—		Non-album singles
"—" denotes a recording that did not chart or was not released in that territory.

== Other charted and certified songs ==
Title	Year	Peak chart positions				Certifications	Album
Title	Year	US	US R&B /HH	UK	UK HH /R&B	Certifications	Album
"Pt. 2" (Kanye West featuring Caroline Shaw and Desiigner)	2016	54	18	70	18	RIAA: Platinum; BPI: Sliver; RMNZ: Gold	The Life of Pablo
"Freestyle 4" (Kanye West featuring Desiigner)	2016	— (Note: "Freestyle 4" did not make the Billboard Hot 100, but peaked at number 9 on the Bubbling Under Hot 100 chart.)	43	132	38	RIAA: Gold	The Life of Pablo
"The Difference" (Meek Mill featuring Quavo and Desiigner)	2016	84	35	—	—		DC4

== Guest appearances ==
List of non-single guest appearances, with other performing artists, showing year released and album name
Title	Year	Artist(s)	Album
"Pt. 2"	2016	Kanye West, Caroline Shaw	The Life of Pablo
"Freestyle 4"	2016	Kanye West	The Life of Pablo
"Back in My Ways"	2016	Young King, Mekado	—N/a
"The Difference" (Additional vocals)	2016	Meek Mill, Quavo	DC4
"Plug Callin (Remix)"	2016	Rich the Kid, Famous Dex	—N/a
"Going"	2016	Rich the Kid, Quavo	Keep Flexin
"X 4 X"	2017	Wiz Khalifa	Bong Rips
"Suicidal"	2018	Diplo	California
"Bruce Wayne"	2018	ThouxanBanFauni	—N/a
"Benzema"	2023	Arta, Smokepurpp	Tsunami
"Sky City"	2024	¥$, CyHi, 070 Shake	Vultures 2

== Music videos ==
Year	Title	Director	Artist(s)
As main performer
2016	"Panda"	Paul Geusebroek	Desiigner
2016	"Zombie Walk"	Grant Curatola	Desiigner featuring King Savage
2017	"Outlet"	Desiigner and Grant Curatola	Desiigner
2017	"Liife"	Desiigner and Shomi Patwary	Desiigner featuring Gucci Mane
2018	"Priice Tag"	Sebastian Sdagui	Desiigner
2018	"Tonka"		Desiigner
2018	"HOOD"		Desiigner
2019	"Diva"	Desiigner and Bobby Misner	Desiigner
As featured performer
2015	"On the Low"	Plain Native and Kash	Phresher featuring Desiigner
2017	"Gucci Snakes"	Hype Williams	Tyga featuring Desiigner
2017	"The Song of the Summer"	Scott Brown	Logan Paul featuring Desiigner and David Hasselhoff
2017	"All Around the World"	Yoni Lappin	Mura Masa featuring Desiigner
