= Dorrough discography =

- Studio albums: 4
- Singles: 24
- Mixtapes: 6

American rapper Dorrough, also known under the alias Dorrough Music, has released four studio albums, six mixtapes and twenty-four singles.

== Albums ==
=== Studio albums ===
List of studio albums, with selected chart positions
| Title | Album details | Peak chart positions | | | |
| Title | Album details | US | US Ind. | US R&B | US Rap |
|---|---|---|---|---|---|
| Dorrough Music | Released: August 4, 2009 (US); Labels: NGenius, Prime Time, E1; Formats: CD, digital download, streaming | 36 | 4 | 6 | 2 |
| Get Big | Released: September 7, 2010 (US); Labels: NGenius, Prime Time, E1; Formats: CD, digital download, streaming | 68 | 9 | 15 | 9 |
| Ride wit Me | Released: May 19, 2017 (US); Label: Real Talk; Formats: CD, digital download, streaming | — | — | — | — |
| Star Baby | Released: July 7, 2023 (US); Label: Music Access; Formats: Digital download, streaming | — | — | — | — |
"—" denotes a recording that did not chart.

=== Mixtapes ===
List of mixtapes
| Title | Album details |
|---|---|
| Number 23 (Gangsta Grillz) (with DJ Drama) | Released: February 17, 2010 (worldwide); Format: Digital download |
| Gangsta Grillz: Code Red (with DJ Drama) | Released: February 3, 2011; Format: Digital download |
| Gangsta Grillz: Silent Assassin (with DJ Drama) | Released: August 9, 2011; Label: E1; Format: Digital download |
| Highlights (with DJ Ill Will and DJ Rockstar) | Released: April 2, 2012 (worldwide); Format: Digital download |
| Shut the City Down (with DJ Smallz, DJ Scream and Mr. Rogers) | Released: May 24, 2013 (worldwide); Format: Digital download |
| Shut the City Down 2 (with DJ Skee and DJ Base) | Released: May 18, 2015 (worldwide); Format: Digital download |

== Singles ==
=== As lead artist ===
| Title | Year | Peak chart positions | | | | Certifications | Album |
| Title | Year | US | US R&B | US Rap | US Rhyth. | Certifications | Album |
|---|---|---|---|---|---|---|---|
| "Walk That Walk" | 2009 | — (Note: "Walk That Walk" did not enter the Billboard Hot 100, but peaked at number 20 on the Bubbling Under Hot 100 Singles chart.) | 32 | 20 | — | | Dorrough Music |
| "Ice Cream Paint Job" | 2009 | 27 | 10 | 5 | 14 | RIAA: Platinum | Dorrough Music |
| "Wired to the T" | 2009 | — | — (Note: "Wired to the T" did not enter the Hot R&B/Hip-Hop Songs chart, but peaked at number six on the Bubbling Under R&B/Hip-Hop Singles chart.) | — | — | | Dorrough Music |
| "I Want (Hood Christmas Anthem)" | 2009 | — | — | — | — | | Non-album single |
| "Number 23" | 2010 | — | — | — | — | | Number 23 (Gangsta Grillz) |
| "Hood Bitch Fetish" (featuring Yo Gotti) | 2010 | — | 92 | — | — | | Get Big |
| "Get Big" | 2010 | — (Note: "Get Big" did not enter the Billboard Hot 100, but peaked at number nine on the Bubbling Under Hot 100 Singles chart.) | 24 | 16 | 39 | | Get Big |
| "She Hot" (with Ay Bay Bay, featuring Official) | 2011 | — | 96 | — | — | | Non-album single |
| "After Party" | 2013 | — | — | — | 39 | | Shut the City Down |
| "La La La" (featuring Wiz Khalifa) | 2013 | — | — | — | — | | Non-album single |
| "Gotta Go" | 2023 | — | — | — | — | | Star Baby |
| "Obsession" (with Yung Nation) | 2023 | — | — | — | — | | Star Baby |
| "Rain Drops" (with Lil' Flip) | 2023 | — | — | — | — | | Star Baby |
| "Ball-N-Parlay" (with Z-Ro and Tum Tum) | 2023 | — | — | — | — | | Star Baby |
| "Boyz Gettin Quiet" | 2023 | — | — | — | — | | Star Baby |
| "25 Flows" | 2023 | — | — | — | — | | Star Baby |
| "Internet Girl" | 2023 | — | — | — | — | | Star Baby |
| "Hi" (Freestyle) _{(with Hashi Senjoo)} | 2025 | | | | | | Non-Album Single |
"—" denotes a recording that did not chart.

=== As featured artist ===
List of singles as a featured artist, with selected chart positions, showing year released and album name
| Title | Year | Peak chart positions | | Album |
| Title | Year | US R&B | US Rap Digital | Album |
|---|---|---|---|---|
| "Halle Berry" (SuperSTARR featuring Dorrough) | 2008 | 85 | — | Non-album single |
| "We Be Getting Money" (Juvenile featuring Shawty Lo, Dorrough and Kango Slim) | 2009 | — | — | Cocky & Confident |
| "I Stay" (A Bay Bay featuring Dorrough and Trai'D) | 2010 | 82 | — | Non-album singles |
| "The Main Event" (Chamillionaire featuring Slim Thug, Paul Wall and Dorrough) | 2010 | — | 46 | Non-album singles |
| "Smile & Wave" (Huey featuring Dorrough) | 2010 | — | — | Redemption |
| "Triple D Anthem" (Big Chief featuring Dorrough Music and Bay Bay) | 2011 | — | — | Eat Greedy, Vol. 12 |
| "Live in the Mix" (DJ Paul featuring Dorrough Music) | 2015 | — | — | Da Light Up, Da Poe Up |
"—" denotes a recording that did not chart.

== Guest appearances ==
List of non-single guest appearances, with other performing artists, showing year released and album name
| Title | Year | Other artist(s) | Album |
|---|---|---|---|
| "Ain't Chu You" | 2009 | Mike Epps, Young Dro, Nitti | Funny Bidness: Da Album |
| "Twerk" | 2009 | Juicy J, Project Pat | Cut Throat |
| "End of the Night" | 2011 | Kid Ink | Daydreamer |
| "Live Forever" | 2012 | Young Noble, June Summers, Nutt-So, Wack Deuce, New Child, Tey Martel | Outlaw Rydahz Vol. 1 |
| "I'm Doin' It" | 2012 | E-40 | The Block Brochure: Welcome to the Soil 2 |
| "Girl Scout Cookies" | 2012 | Blanco, Nipsey Hussle | Raw |
| "Chocolate Thai" | 2012 | Blanco, Nipsey Hussle, Lucky Luciano | Raw |
| "Solo" | 2012 | Waka Flocka Flame, Shawty Lo | Salute Me or Shoot Me 4 (Banned from America) |
| "Cat Daddy" (Remix) | 2012 | The Rej3ctz, Tyga, Mann, Chamillionaire | Non-album songs |
| "Yeah Doe" | 2012 | Tum-Tum, B-Hamp, Big Tuck | Non-album songs |
| "I Want" | 2012 | Trina, Slim Thug | Back 2 Business |
| "Stupid Dumb" | 2013 | DJ Mustard, Bounce | Ketchup |
| "Who Got It" | 2013 | League of Starz, Problem, Dupri | LOS.FM |
| "Lotta Money" | 2014 | Trina, Lotta Money, Slim Thug, Twista | Incredible |

== Music videos ==
=== As lead artist ===
List of music videos as a lead artist, with directors, showing year released
| Title | Year | Director(s) |
|---|---|---|
| "Walk That Walk" | 2009 | Dr. Teeth |
| "Ice Cream Paint Job" | 2009 | Dr. Teeth |
| "Wired to the T" | 2009 | Dr. Teeth |
| "Get Big" | 2010 | Dr. Teeth |
| "Get Big" (Remix) (featuring DJ Drama, Diddy, Yo Gotti, Bun B, Diamond, Shawty Lo and Maino) | 2010 | Rage |
| "Code Red" | 2011 | Juan Salas |
| "She Hot" (with Ay Bay Bay, featuring Official) | 2011 | Brian Childs |
| "Bounce Dat" (featuring Ay Bay Bay) | 2011 | Jason Kabolati |
| "That Lowend" (featuring Nipsey Hussle) | 2012 | Jeff Adair |
| "M.I.A." | 2012 | Jeff Adair |
| "After Party" | 2013 | Tha Razor |
| "Beat Up the Block" (featuring Lil Boosie) | 2015 | Jeff Adair |

=== As featured artist ===
List of music videos as a featured artist, with directors, showing year released
| Title | Year | Director(s) |
|---|---|---|
| "We Be Getting Money" (Juvenile featuring Shawty Lo, Dorrough and Kango Slim) | 2009 | Parris |
