= Afterparty =

(The) Afterparty or After Party may refer to:

- A party that takes place after another event

== Film and television ==
=== Film ===
- The After Party (film), a 2018 American film
- After Party (film), a 2024 Czech film
- The After Party: The Last Party 3, a 2011 documentary feature film

=== TV ===
- "The After Party", a 2005 episode of 8 Simple Rules
- "The After Party" (Motherland), a 2017 television episode
- The Afterparty (TV series), a 2022 American murder mystery comedy television series

== Music ==
=== Albums ===
- The After Party (album), a 2014 album by Ghost Town
- Afterparty (album), a 2008 album by Cool Kids of Death
- The Afterparty (Captain Hollywood Project album), 1996
- The Afterparty (Lykke Li album), 2026
- After Party (album), a 2016 album by Adore Delano

=== Songs ===
- "After Party" (song), a 2020 song by Don Toliver
- "After Party", a song by Desiigner from the EP L.O.D., 2018
- "After Party", a 2013 song by Dorrough
- "After Party", a 2001 song by Koffee Brown from the album Mars/Venus
- "Afterparty", a 2007 song by Freezepop from the album Future Future Future Perfect
- "Afterparty", a 2016 song by Balance and Composure from the album Light We Made

== Other uses ==
- Afterparty (video game), a 2019 video game
- After Party (book), 2025 poetry collection by Dean Browne

== See also ==
- Party (disambiguation)
