= Billboard Music Award for Top Streaming Song (Video) =

Annual American music award

This is a list of winners and nominees of the Billboard Music Award for Top Streaming Song (Video). Justin Bieber is the inaugural winner, winning in 2011. He also holds the record for the most wins in this category, with two awards.

Year	Song	Musician	Nominees
2011	"Baby"	Justin Bieber & Ludacris	Eminem featuring Rihanna – Love the Way You Lie; Eminem – Not Afraid Lady Gaga – Bad Romance Shakira featuring Freshlyground – Waka Waka (This Time for Africa)
2012	"Super Bass"	Nicki Minaj	LMFAO feat. Lauren Bennett and GoonRock – Party Rock Anthem; Adele – Someone like You; Bruno Mars – The Lazy Song; LMFAO – Sexy and I Know It
2013	"Gangnam Style"	PSY	Fun feat. Janelle Monáe – We Are Young; Carly Rae Jepsen – Call Me Maybe; Macklemore & Ryan Lewis feat. Wanz – Thrift Shop; Taylor Swift – We Are Never Ever Getting Back Together
2014	"Wrecking Ball"	Miley Cyrus	Baauer – Harlem Shake; Miley Cyrus – We Can't Stop; Macklemore & Ryan Lewis feat. Wanz – Thrift Shop; Katy Perry – Roar
2015	"Shake It Off"	Taylor Swift	Idina Menzel – Let It Go; Bobby Shmurda – Hot Boy; Taylor Swift – Blank Space; Meghan Trainor – All About That Bass
2016	"Watch Me"	Silento	Fetty Wap – Trap Queen; Wiz Khalifa feat. Charlie Puth – See You Again; Mark Ronson feat. Bruno Mars – Uptown Funk! The Weeknd – The Hills
2017	"Panda"	Desiigner	Rae Sremmurd featuring Gucci Mane – "Black Beatles"; The Chainsmokers featuring Halsey – "Closer"; Twenty One Pilots – "Heathens"; Zay Hilfigerrr & Zayion McCall – "Juju on That Beat (TZ Anthem)"
2018	"Despacito"	Luis Fonsi and Daddy Yankee featuring Justin Bieber	Cardi B – "Bodak Yellow"; Lil Pump – "Gucci Gang"; Ed Sheeran – "Shape of You"; Bruno Mars – "That's What I Like"

== Multiple awards and nominations ==
=== Wins ===
2 wins

- Justin Bieber

=== Nominations ===
3 nominations

- Taylor Swift
- Bruno Mars

2 nominations

- Miley Cyrus
- LMFAO
- Macklemore & Ryan Lewis
- Justin Bieber
- Eminem
