= Outlet (song) =

Single by Desiigner
- Released: February 10, 2017
- Recorded: 2016
- Genre: Hip hop
- Length: 4:28
- Label: GOOD; Def Jam
- Songwriters: Sidney Selby III; Anderson Hernandez; Rian Bastilo; Corey Thompson
- Producers: Vinylz; CT (co.); Mike Dean (add.)

Desiigner singles chronology
"Circles" (2016)	"Outlet" (2017)	"Holy Ghost" (2017)

Music video
- "Outlet" on YouTube

"Outlet" is a song by American rapper Desiigner. It was released on February 10, 2017, for digital download by GOOD Music and Def Jam Recordings. The song is written by Desiigner, Rian Basilio, producer Vinylz, and co-producer CT, with additional production by Mike Dean.

== Music video ==
The song's accompanying music video premiered on June 21, 2017, on Desiigner's YouTube account. The video was filmed mostly at Manchester United's Old Trafford and features a cameo appearance from Paul Pogba.

== Charts ==
Chart performance for "Outlet"
Chart (2017)	Peak position
Canada Hot 100 (Billboard)	86
US Bubbling Under Hot 100 (Billboard)	5
US Hot R&B/Hip-Hop Songs (Billboard)	48

== Certifications ==
Certifications for "Outlet"
Region	Certification	Certified units/sales
Brazil (Pro-Música Brasil)	Gold	30,000^{‡}
^{‡} Sales+streaming figures based on certification alone.
