= Cool Kids of Death =

Polish alternative rock band

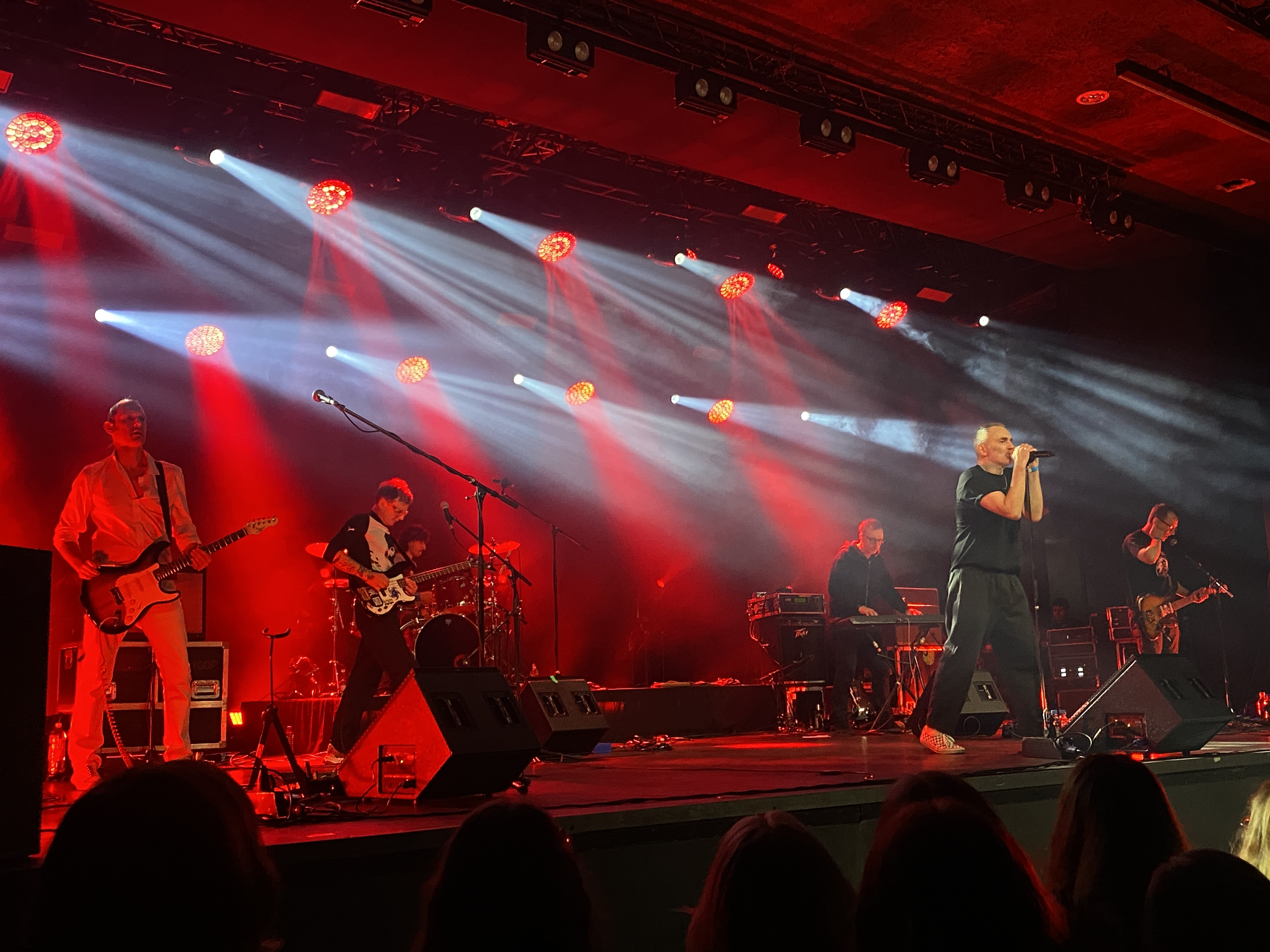
- Cool Kids Of Death (2024)

Background information
- Origin: Łódź, Poland
- Genres: alternative rock
- Years active: 2001–present
- Labels: Sissy Records, BMG Poland, Sony BMG Music Entertainment Poland, Agora SA, Sony Music Entertainment Poland
- Members: Krzysztof Ostrowski; Jakub Wandachowicz; Marcin Kowalski; Kamil Łazikowski; Wojciech Michalec; Łukasz Klaus
- Past members: Jacek Frąś

The Cool Kids of Death is a Polish alternative rock band formed in Łódź in 2001. Their name comes from a Saint Etienne song.

The band is well known in Poland due to their radical lyrics and widely expressing the "Generation Nothing" (Polish: Generacja Nic) voice –the "movement" which accused the Polish establishment of constraining the professional chances and future of young and well-educated Poles.

== Discography ==
Title	Album details	Peak chart positions
Title	Album details	POL
Cool Kids of Death	Released: June 24, 2002; Label: Sissy Records, BMG Poland; Formats: CD, CS	—
2	Released: September 1, 2003; Label: Sissy Records, BMG Poland; Formats: CD (+CD)	3
Cool Kids of Death (English edit.)	Released: April 25, 2005; Label: Sony BMG Music Entertainment Poland; Formats: CD	—
2006	Released: March 13, 2006; Label: Sony BMG Music Entertainment Poland; Formats: CD	15
Afterparty	Released: April 18, 2008; Label: Agora SA; Formats: CD	—
Plan ewakuacji	Released: October 10, 2011; Label: Sony Music Entertainment Poland; Formats: CD, digital download	38
"—" denotes a recording that did not chart or was not released in that territory.
