= Castro (song) =

Single by Yo Gotti featuring Kanye West, Big Sean, 2 Chainz and Quavo

from the album White Friday (CM9)
- Released: December 16, 2016
- Recorded: 2016
- Genre: Hip hop
- Length: 3:39
- Label: Epic; CMG; Roc Nation
- Songwriters: Mario Mims; Benjamin Diehl; Kanye West; Sean Anderson; Tauheed Epps; Quavious Marshall
- Producer: Ben Billions

Yo Gotti singles chronology
"Wait for It" (2016)	"Castro" (2016)	"Weatherman" (2016)

Kanye West singles chronology
"Tiimmy Turner (remix)" (2016)	"Castro" (2016)	"Feel Me" (2017)

Big Sean singles chronology
"Bounce Back" (2016)	"Castro" (2016)	"Moves" (2017)

2 Chainz singles chronology
"Big Amount" (2016)	"Castro" (2016)	"Throw Myself a Party" (2016)

Quavo singles chronology
"Champions" (2016)	"Castro" (2016)	"Good Drank" (2017)

"Castro" is a song by American rapper Yo Gotti featuring fellow American rappers Kanye West, Big Sean, 2 Chainz, and Quavo. It was released on December 16, 2016 as a single from Gotti's 2016 mixtape White Friday (CM9).

== Background ==
The song's title is a reference to Cuban leader Fidel Castro, who died within the same month of its release. Prior to "Castro" being released, West was with Gotti in Los Angeles when premiering his "Saint Pablo" record.

== Critical reception ==
Tom Breihan of Stereogum described the track as 'a skittery, synthetic banger' and showed disappointment in West's feature when writing: 'Does a song like this make you feel any better about Kanye West right now? It doesn't make me feel any better about Kanye West.' The FADER's Will Bundy branded it as 'a monster posse cut'.

== Commercial performance ==
"Castro" charted at number 16 on the US Billboard Bubbling Under Hot 100 on January 14, 2017, around a month after having been released as a single.

== Charts ==
Chart (2016)	Peak position
US Bubbling Under Hot 100 (Billboard)	16
US Bubbling Under R&B/Hip-Hop Singles (Billboard)	4

== Release history ==
Region	Date	Format	Label	Ref.
Various	December 16, 2016	Digital download	Epic; CMG; Roc Nation	
