= Guitar Crusher =

American singer and guitarist (1931–2020)

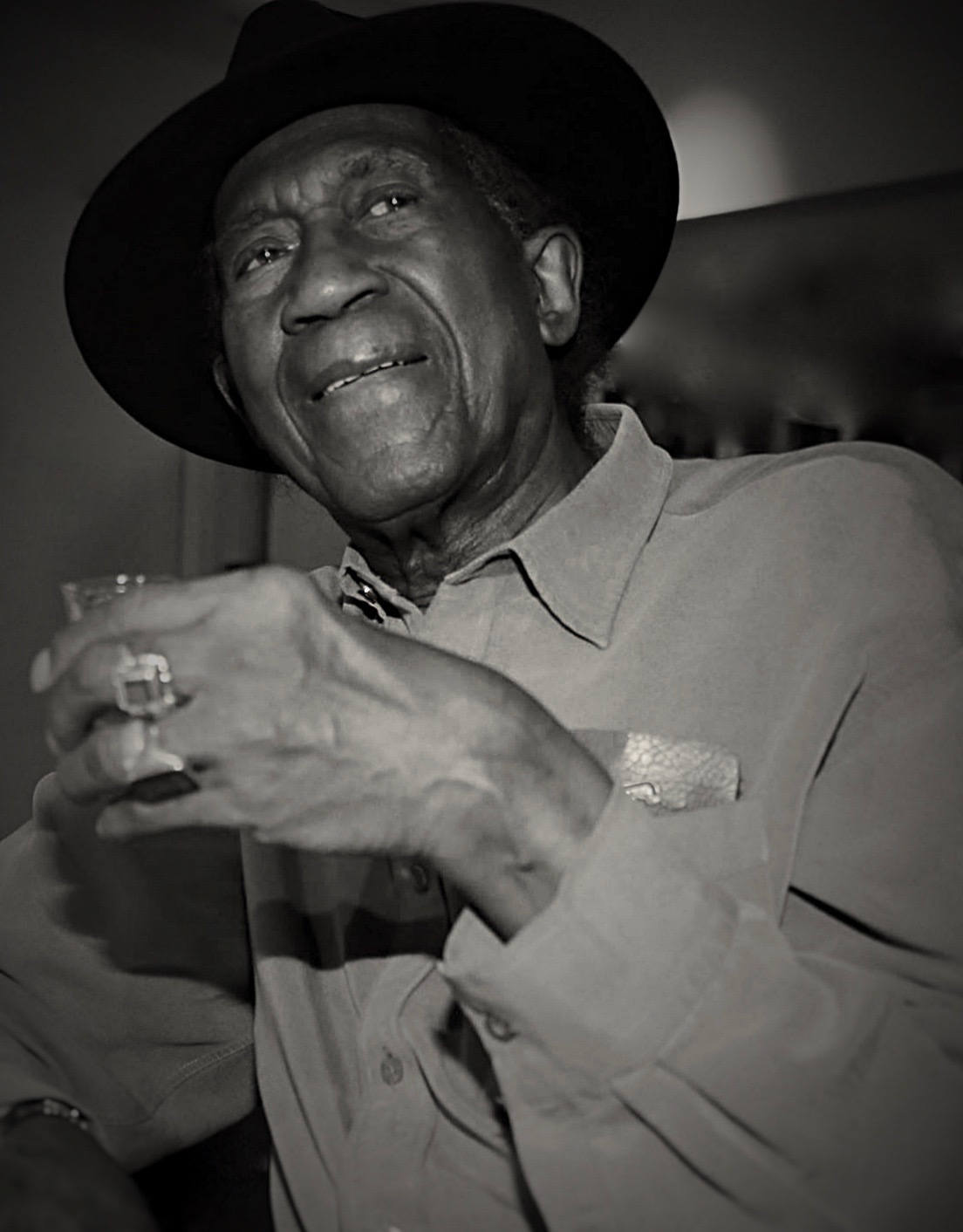

Background information
- Also known as: Guitar Crusher; Bone Crusher
- Born: Sidney Selby; July 28, 1931; Hyde County, North Carolina, United States
- Died: September 23, 2020 (aged 89)
- Genres: Blues, soul, rhythm and blues
- Occupations: Singer, songwriter, musician
- Instruments: Vocals, guitar, blues harp
- Years active: 1950–2020
- Labels: King Records, T&S Records, In-Akustik, Hotsak,
- Relatives: Desiigner (grandson)

Sidney Selby (July 28, 1931 – September 23, 2020), known as "Guitar Crusher" and formerly as "Bone Crusher", was an American blues singer and guitarist, for many years based in Berlin, Germany. Primarily a singer, billed as "The Big Voice from New York", he also played guitar and blues harmonica.

== Life and career ==
Selby was born at Lake Landing, in Hyde County, North Carolina. He sang gospel in the Mt. Pilgrim Baptist Church and on the radio as a schoolboy. At the age of 15 he went to live with his mother in New York. He started a band The Midnight Rockers and performed in colleges and clubs in the NY area. In the 1960s he recorded a number of singles on King and other labels. He also toured with artists such as Ben E. King, The Drifters and The Isley Brothers.

In 1982, he went to Berlin, Germany with New York guitarist Nick Katzman, and began to attract an audience. With the new Midnight Rockers they soon performed in clubs and on major festivals all over Europe. Their repertoire included Selby's originals, R&B standards, ballads and soul classics. On his recordings and live gigs he was backed by artists such as Katie Webster, Eb Davis, "Detroit" Gary Wiggins, Christian Rannenberg, Tyree Glenn Jr., Alvin Lee, Charles 'Honeyboy' Otis, Wild Jimmy Spruill, Benny Bailey, Calvin Owens, Marcos Coll, Thomm Jutz and Hans McMinamin and many others.

Originally known as "Bone Crusher", Selby's name changed to "Guitar Crusher" after he smashed his guitar over the head of an unruly customer in a club during his show. He was called a "living legend" by the press in Germany several times.

Selby was married to Mara von Hartz-Selby. His grandson is rapper Desiigner.

== Discography ==
=== Singles ===
- Guitar Crusher & the Houserocking Mellotones: I've Got to Know / Cuddle Up (USA 1962)
- Guitar Crusher & the Houserocking Mellotones: I Feel the Pain / I Once Loved You Baby (USA 1962)
- Guitar Crusher & the Houserocking Mellotones: Itch With Me / the Monkey (USA 1962)
- Guitar Crusher: Better Days Ahead / Weak for Your Love (USA 1963)
- Guitar Crusher: I Can't Help It / Why Oh Why (USA 1963)
- Guitar Crusher With Jimmy Spruill: Since My Baby Hit the Numbers / Hambone Blues (USA 1968)
- Guitar Crusher: I'll Catch Your Tears / Goin' Down Slow (USA 1969)

=== Albums ===
- Live at Quasimodo Berlin (CD) Sidney Selby and Orchestra Feat. Benny Bailey trumpet (Ger 1989)
- I Can Do Bad by Myself (Lp) Jack McDuff, Bruce "Bud" Revels Jr., Melvin Sparks Hassan (USA 1990)
- Blues From the Heart (CD) Originals Live + Studio Recordings (Ger 1990)
- Googa Mooga (CD) New York "Wild" Jimmy Spruill, Charles "Honeyboy" Otis, W.Bridges a.o. (Bel 1993)
- Message to Man (CD) Black Cat Bone, Feat. Alvin Lee, C.Owens ( Ger 1995)
- How I Feel (CD) Rolling Dollar, Feat. Tyree Glenn Jr. Ten.sax, T.Harris Dr. a.o. (Ger 1999)
- Sidney "Guitar Crusher" Selby (CD): Live at Yorkschlösschen – Soul Session With the Rudy Stevenson Band (Ger 1999)
- Blues With a Feeling (CD) Guitar Crusher & the Kloeber Bros. (Ger 2004)
- Blast From the Past (CD) (Ger 2009) – a Stereophonic 45 Compilation
- Cooking Live! (CD) Guitar Crusher Meets Blossbluez (Ger 2018)

==== Compilations ====
- In Our Own Way... Oldies But Goodies (Lp) (UK 1970)
- Boogie on Broadway (Lp) (198? Hol )
- Lookey Dookey (Lp) (19?? )
- Savage Kick Vol.2 – Black Rock'n'Roll (Lp) (UK 1992)
- Talking Trash! Lookey Dookey (CD) (UK 1997)
- The Blue Horizon Story 1965–1970, Vol.1 (3-cd) (1997)
- Fresh Blues, Vol.2 – The Inak Blues Connection (CD) (1998)
- Shout Bamalama (CD) (UK 1999)
- Old Town City Blues (CD) (Us 2000)
- Stompin' 4 (CD) (UK 2001)
- Rhythm & Blues Goes Rock & Roll, Vol.2 (CD) (Ger 2002)
