= Ice Cream Paint Job =

Single by Dorrough

from the album Dorrough Music
- Released: April 7, 2009
- Recorded: 2008
- Genre: Crunk
- Length: 3:59
- Label: Ngenius Ent, E1 Music
- Songwriter: Dorrough
- Producer: 2Much

Dorrough singles chronology
| "Walk That Walk" (2009) | "Ice Cream Paint Job" (2009) | "Wired to the T" (2009) |

Music video
- "Ice Cream Paint Job" on YouTube

"Ice Cream Paint Job" is a song by Dorrough from his debut album, Dorrough Music. The single peaked at number 27 on the Billboard Hot 100. It has been certified platinum by the RIAA.

== Music video ==
A video was shot for the song, which features Dorrough driving the streets of Texas, standing in front of a huge chart that reads "Periodic Table of Dallas", and making his way to a car show at which he performs the song. Cameos are made by Lil Boosie, Slim Thug, Paul Wall, Bun B, and Chamillionaire.

== Remixes and freestyles ==
- The first official remix was released on iTunes on August 11, 2009, featuring Jermaine Dupri, Soulja Boy, Jim Jones, Slim Thug, E-40, and Rich Boy.
- A megamix featuring Chalie Boy, Wreckamic, C Hen, Snoop Dogg, Nipsey Hussle, Jermaine Dupri, Soulja Boy, Jim Jones, Slim Thug, E-40 & Rich Boy was released September 1, 2009, by Dj Fletch on Dorrough's mixtape Mr. D-O Double R.
- The second official remix, called the "West Coast Remix", features Jim Jones, Soulja Boy, E-40, Snoop Dogg, and Nipsey Hussle. It was released on iTunes on September 22, 2009. This remix has two versions: the digital download single version, which has E-40's verse after Jones but doesn't feature Soulja Boy; and the main version, which has Soulja Boy's verse after Jones but doesn't feature E-40.
- E-40 and Soulja Boy Tell 'Em created a shortened, more radio-friendly remix.
- Lil Wayne performed a freestyle for his No Ceilings mixtape.
- Tyga performed a freestyle of this song on his mixtape Black Thoughts.
- A remix featuring D. Woods and Mika Means was made for D. Woods' mixtape "Independence Day, Vol. 2".
- Girl Talk's 2010 track "Oh No" from the album All Day sampled the song.

== Chart performance ==
"Ice Cream Paint Job" debuted on the Billboard Hot 100 on the week ending June 13, 2009, at number 92. Fourteen weeks later, it peaked at number 27 on the week ending September 19, 2009, and spent a total of twenty weeks on the chart after dropping off. To date, this is Dorrough's only top 40 hit on that chart.

== Charts and certifications ==
=== Weekly charts ===
| Chart (2009) | Peak position |
|---|---|
| US Billboard Hot 100 | 27 |
| US Hot R&B/Hip-Hop Songs (Billboard) | 10 |
| US Hot Rap Songs (Billboard) | 5 |
| US Pop 100 (Billboard) | 78 |
| US Rhythmic Airplay (Billboard) | 14 |

=== Year-end charts ===
| Chart (2009) | Position |
|---|---|
| US Hot R&B/Hip-Hop Songs (Billboard) | 48 |
| US Rap Songs (Billboard) | 14 |

=== Certifications ===
| Region | Certification | Certified units/sales |
|---|---|---|
| United States (RIAA) | Platinum | 1,000,000^{^} |
^{^} Shipments figures based on certification alone.
