= Father Stretch My Hands =

2016 singles by Kanye West

"Father Stretch My Hands, Pt. 1"

Single by Kanye West

from the album The Life of Pablo
- Released: June 7, 2016
- Recorded: November 11, 2013 – March 2016
- Genre: Hip hop; art pop
- Length: 2:16
- Label: GOOD; Def Jam
- Songwriters: Kanye West; Scott Mescudi; Rick Rubin; Aubrey Graham; Noah Goldstein; Leland Wayne; Cydel Young; Allen Ritter; Jerome Potter; Samuel Griesemer; Chancelor Bennett; T. L. Barrett
- Producers: Kanye West; Mike Dean; Rick Rubin; Metro Boomin

Kanye West singles chronology
"That Part" (2016)	"Father Stretch My Hands, Pt. 1" (2016)	"Champions" (2016)

"Pt. 2"

Single by Kanye West

from the album The Life of Pablo
- Released: June 7, 2016
- Recorded: 2015–2016
- Genre: Hip hop; art pop; trap
- Length: 2:10
- Label: GOOD; Def Jam
- Songwriters: Kanye West; Rick Rubin; Cydel Young; Sidney Selby III; Adnan Khan; Caroline Shaw; Pat Reynolds; T. L. Barrett
- Producers: Kanye West; Menace; Rick Rubin

Kanye West singles chronology
"That Part" (2016)	"Pt. 2" (2016)	"Champions" (2016)

"Father Stretch My Hands" is a pair of songs by American rapper Kanye West from his seventh studio album, The Life of Pablo (2016). They are split into two parts on the album: "Father Stretch My Hands, Pt. 1" and "Pt. 2". "Pt. 1" contains vocals by American rapper Kid Cudi and American R&B singer Kelly Price, alongside production from Mike Dean, Metro Boomin, and Rick Rubin, while "Pt. 2" includes vocals from American rapper Desiigner and American musician Caroline Shaw, alongside returning production from Rubin and new production from Menace. Prior to release, the latter was played by West for Desiigner when the two met.

On June 7, 2016, both parts of "Father Stretch My Hands" were sent to US rhythmic contemporary radio stations through GOOD Music and Def Jam as a two-part single, standing as the second single from The Life of Pablo. Both parts of the song sample gospel musician and preacher T. L. Barrett's track "Father I Stretch My Hands"; "Pt. 2" remixes Desiigner's song "Panda" and features a sample of a sound clip from the 1991 video game Street Fighter II. West raps about models in his "Pt. 1" verse and delivers confessions in his "Pt. 2" verse.

"Father Stretch My Hands" received widespread acclaim from music critics; "Pt. 1" was listed among the best songs of 2016 by multiple publications, including Complex and HipHopDX, R&B/Hip-Hop and Rap Song Winner at the 2017 ASCAP Rhythm & Soul Music Awards, and was among the 35 Most Performed R&B/Hip-Hop Songs at the 2017 BMI R&B/Hip-Hop Awards. Both parts of the song charted in the United States, the United Kingdom, Sweden, the Netherlands, Ireland, and Canada in 2016. "Pt. 1" and "Pt. 2" have since been certified sextuple platinum and platinum, respectively, by the Recording Industry Association of America (RIAA) in the United States, while both respective parts have been certified silver by the British Phonographic Industry (BPI) in the United Kingdom.

A reinterpretation of "Pt. 1", produced by West, was released under the title of "Father Stretch" by his gospel group Sunday Service Choir, specifically on their debut studio album, Jesus Is Born (2019). It lacks sexually explicit lyrics and includes more elements of the gospel than the original. The song received generally positive reviews from music critics. The majority of them commented on the song's development from the original, while some critics noted its appeal to certain audiences. The song peaked at number ten on the US Billboard Gospel Songs chart in 2020.

== Background ==
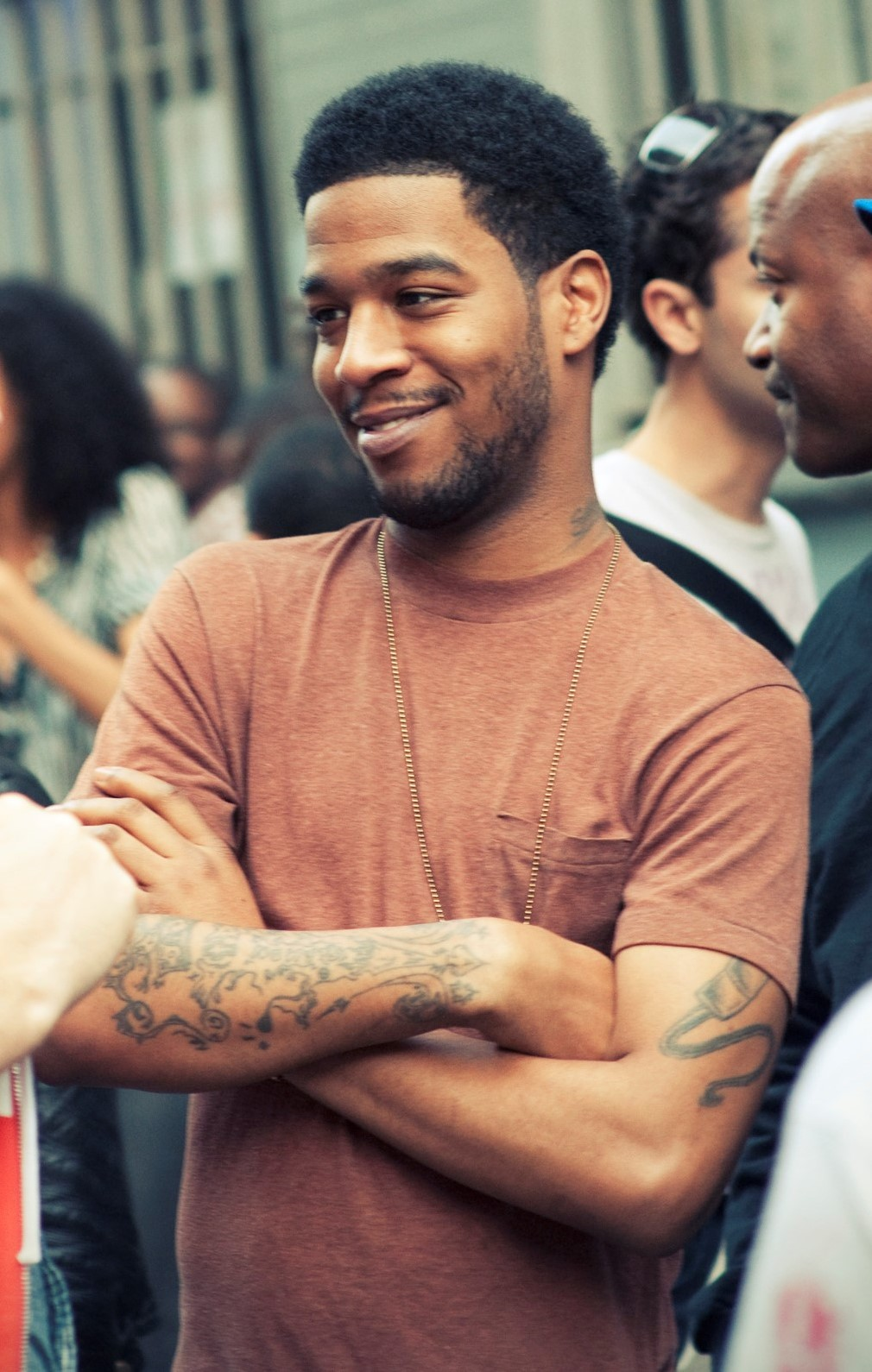
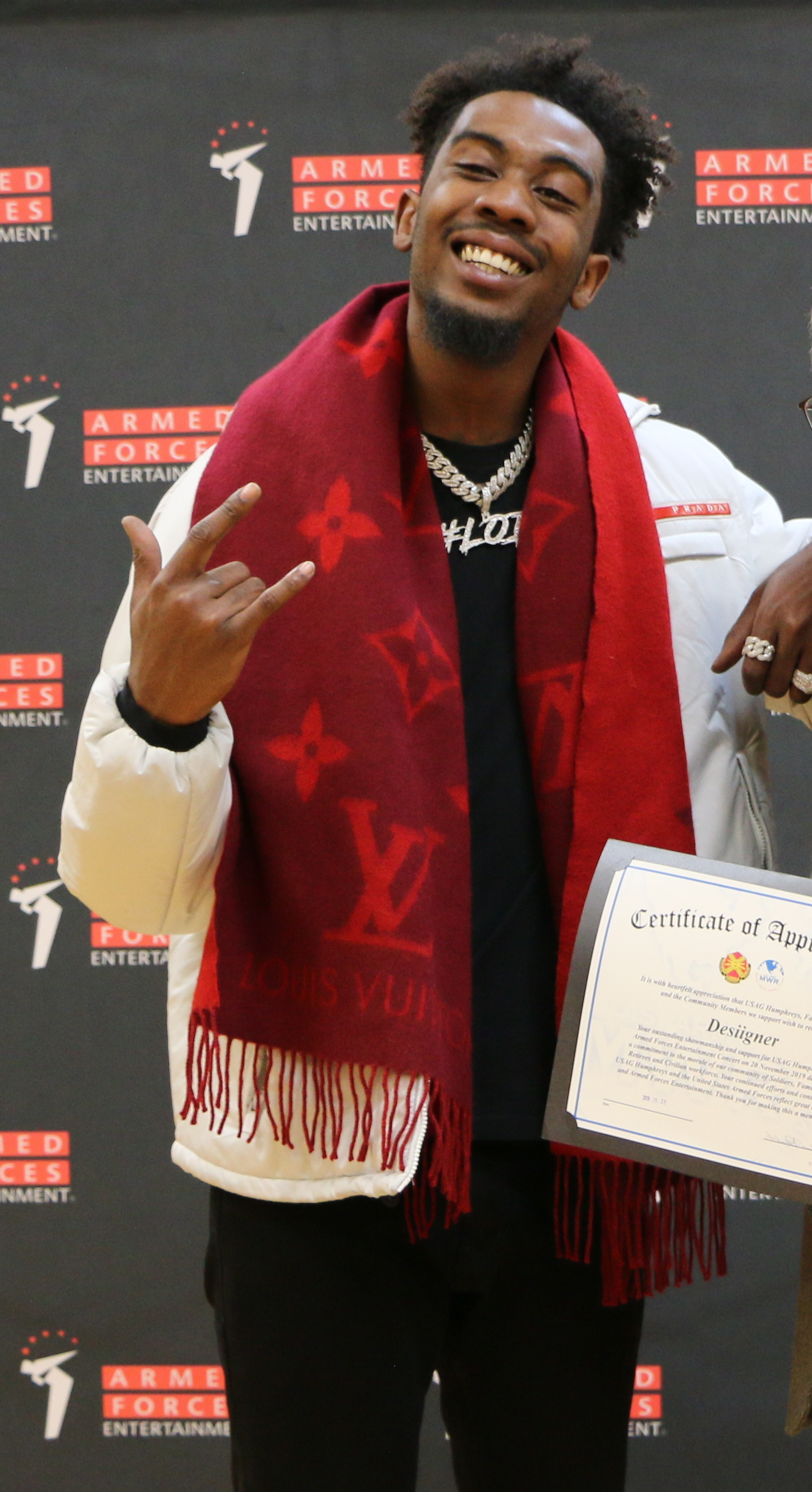
"Pt. 1" and "Pt. 2" contain vocals by Kid Cudi (left, in 2010) and Desiigner (right, in 2019), respectively.

West and Kid Cudi had collaborated on several tracks before "Pt. 1"; their first collaboration was the former's 2008 track "Welcome to Heartbreak". Desiigner met West in front of Los Angeles International Airport after West called him to arrange a meeting, and West played "Pt. 2" for Desiigner in his car. In an interview with The Fader, Desiigner said about his single "Panda" being sampled by West in the track: "He just took my song and was like, 'I love it.'" Caroline Shaw was approached backstage by West, who asked for her phone number, at a 2014 Roomful of Teeth performance of Partita for 8 Voices. Originally uninterested in a collaboration, Shaw changed her mind two weeks later after listening to West's 2008 album 808s & Heartbreak and released a remix of the album's song "Say You Will" in October 2015. In addition to "Pt. 2", Shaw recorded vocals for The Life of Pablo's "Wolves".

A one-hour remix of "Father Stretch My Hands" was shared by West at the June 26, 2016 premiere of the music video for his single, "Famous". West tweeted a picture of the song's lyrics shortly before the album was released, and said that he cried when he wrote it. Two days after the album's release, West tweeted thanks to musician Drake for helping him write "Pt. 1" and the album track "30 Hours", and simultaneously promised more music with Drake and rapper Future.

== Composition and recording ==
"Pt. 1"
A 32-second sample of "Pt. 1", relying on a sample of "Father I Stretch My Hands" by T. L. Barrett and featuring vocals from Kid Cudi.

On The Life of Pablo, "Father Stretch My Hands" is split into two parts: "Pt. 1" with vocals by Kid Cudi and Kelly Price, and "Pt. 2" with vocals by Desiigner and Caroline Shaw. It is a hip hop and art pop song; "Pt. 1" also incorporates gospel music, and "Pt. 2" moves towards trap music. "Pt. 1" heavily samples "Father I Stretch My Hands" by T. L. Barrett, and its lyrics are centered around models. "Pt. 1" segues into "Pt. 2", a soul-baring confessional dance track which begins with a sampled sound clip of the announcer of the 1991 video game Street Fighter II yelling 'Perfect!'. "Pt. 2" has a verse by West before it transitions to two verses sampled from Desiigner's song, "Panda", which is about drug-dealing and cars. After resolving into a meditative piece spoken on a vocoder by Shaw, the song ends with a snippet of T. L. Barrett's track.

"Pt. 2"
A 31-second sample of "Pt. 2", showcasing West making confessions in his verse at the beginning.

West raps in "Pt. 1", "Now, if I fuck this model/ And she just bleached her asshole/ And I get bleach on my T-shirt/ I'ma feel like an asshole"; although co-writer Chance the Rapper denied responsibility for the lyrics, he expressed respect for them and viewed West as a comedian in the studio. On an episode of BET's video series Rate The Bars, hip hop artist Rhymefest remembered leaving the studio after hearing West come up with the bleached-asshole lyrics. Rapper Kendrick Lamar was originally slated to appear on "Pt. 1", although his vocals were removed from the final version and a demo of the song surfaced on SoundCloud in March 2018 that included him rapping. At the time, West sent out a tweet instating "Me and Kendrick got 40 songs, and me and Young Thug got 40 songs."

After the release of The Life of Pablo, West announced plans to change the album during 2016 with new mixes, tweaks, and additions; Def Jam, his label, called it "a living, evolving art project." Some songs experienced greater changes than others, and both parts of "Father Stretch My Hands" received minor updates. They included new background vocals near the end of West's verse in "Pt. 1"; the production (and West's vocals) on "Pt. 2" were smoothed out and emphasized more.

== Release and reception ==
"Father Stretch My Hands" was released on February 14, 2016, as the second and third track on West's seventh studio album, The Life of Pablo, as "Father Stretch My Hands, Pt. 1" and "Pt. 2" respectively. On June 7 of that year, both parts of the song were serviced to US rhythmic contemporary radio stations through GOOD Music and Def Jam as a two-part single.

=== Critical reception ===
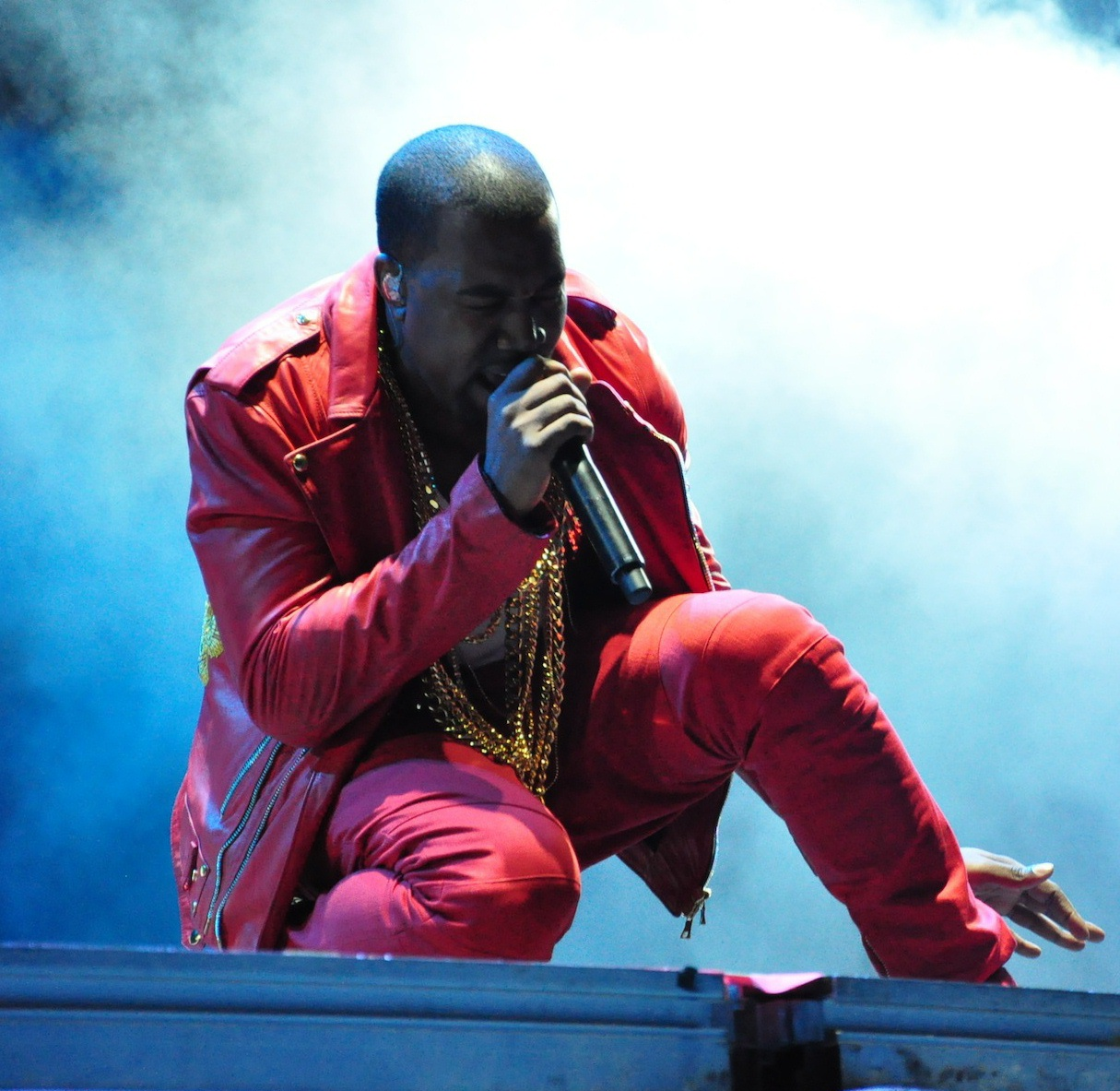
Critical appraisal was often positive towards West's verse on "Pt. 2".

"Father Stretch My Hands" was met with general acclaim from music critics. Jordan Hoffman of Vanity Fair stated that the T. L. Barrett sample is "the sort of perfect sample that makes dealing with West's enormous ego worth it: a unique, distant, strangely familiar sound re-contextualized in a modern groove." Spin's Sheldon Pearce wrote about the sample, "Kanye West tweeted that The Life of Pablo was a gospel album during one of his longer stream-of-consciousness fits and that certainly can be taken literally – the samples of the Pastor T. L. Barrett's 'Father I Stretch My Hands', sermons from Kirk Franklin." Kyle McGovern, also from Spin, pointed towards West's verse on "Pt. 2" as one of the album's "flashes of vintage 'Ye" because of its "references to his childhood and life-changing car wreck."

Alicia Adejobi from the International Business Times also praised West's rapping in the verse for him being "unapologetic about mistakes he may have made and the most notable moments in his personal life," noting the track's "incredible production from Metro Boomin." A RESPECT. staff member wrote that Kid Cudi's hook on "Pt. 1" "is one of the most amazing things I've heard in a while," and called West "the most reckless rapper alive" for the bleached-asshole lyric. The lyric was included in a January 2017 Complex list of the worst sex lyrics in rap history.

=== Accolades ===
Complex listed "Pt. 1" and "Pt. 2" as the third and 13th best songs of 2016, respectively. On The Fader's list of the 115 Best Songs Of 2016, "Pt. 1" ranked at number 19. The song was placed at number 13 on HotNewHipHop's list of the year's 50 hottest songs. It was listed at number three on HipHopDX's 50 Best Songs Of 2016, with the staff writing that "Kanye proved that saying the most nonsensical things could equate to arguably the most memorable verse of the year." The song also achieved the same ranking on the 25 best tracks of 2016 list by Dummy Mag, with Alex Morris of the magazine directing praise towards the T. L. Barrett sample and Kid Cudi's chorus. "Pt. 1" appeared on the "Award-Winning R&B/Hip-Hop Songs" and "Award-Winning Rap Songs" lists at the 2017 ASCAP Rhythm & Soul Music Awards, and was one of the 35 Most Performed R&B/Hip-Hop Songs at the 2017 BMI R&B/Hip-Hop Awards. Complex listed "Pt. 1" as the third-best collaboration between West and Kid Cudi in 2017. In 2018, Billboard named it Cudi's second best ever feature.

== Rumored music video ==
When West was on set to shoot the music video for Desiigner's single, "Panda" in May 2016, a May 11 vine posted by Luka Sabbat indicated that West was also filming a video for "Pt. 2"; a month earlier, he had shot one for The Life of Pablo track "Waves". The vine contained West, on a monitor, rapping portions of "Pt. 2" over the caption "2 times". The video had nearly 33,000 plays in 11 hours, and was deleted within 24 hours of its upload. No music video had been released or spoken of by February 2018, leading to the belief that it was a rumor.

== Commercial performance ==
=== Pt. 1 ===
"Pt. 1" charted in six countries. When The Life of Pablo was released, the song charted at number 37 on the US Billboard Hot 100 and number 14 on the US Hot R&B/Hip-Hop Songs chart before it was released as a single. "Pt. 1" debuted during the same week at number 54 on the UK Singles Chart, though was predicted by the Official Charts Company to enter at number 56 on the chart. Simultaneously with the debut, it reached number 17 on the UK Official Trending Chart. As of October 24, 2019, the song ranks as West's 27th most successful track of all time on the UK Singles Chart. The song performed similarly in Canada to the United Kingdom, charting at number 51 on the Canadian Hot 100 and spending four weeks on the chart. On the Irish Singles Chart, the track reached number 74 the week the album was released. It entered the Swedish national record chart (Sverigetopplistan) at number 79 when The Life of Pablo was released, and debuted that week at number 97 on the Dutch Top 40. "Pt. 1" was West's eighth number-one on the US Billboard R&B/Hip-Hop Airplay chart, on October 20, 2016. The song was certified platinum by the British Phonographic Industry (BPI) in 2023, for sales of 600,000 equivalent unites in the UK, and was certified six-times platinum by the Recording Industry Association of America (RIAA) for selling 6,000,000 certified units in the US on February 15, 2024.

=== Pt. 2 ===
"Pt. 2" performed similarly to "Pt. 1", also charting in six countries. It entered the US Billboard Hot 100 and the US Hot R&B/Hip-Hop Songs chart with The Life of Pablo's release, debuting at numbers 54 and 18 respectively. The song reached number 70 on the UK Singles Chart that week. As of October 26, 2019, the song stands as West's 40th most successful track of all time on the chart. The track debuted at number 60 on the Canadian Hot 100 when the album was released, spending three weeks on the chart. During the same week, it reached number 87 on the Irish Singles Chart. The track debuted at number 95 on the Sverigetopplistan chart when The Life of Pablo was released, and charted at number 100 on the Dutch Top 40 that week. "Pt. 2" was certified platinum by the RIAA for sales of 1,000,000 certified units in the US on February 1, 2018. This was nearly two years after the single's release and the song became the first track from The Life of Pablo to achieve the certification in the US. On November 8, 2019, the song was certified silver by the BPI for selling 200,000 equivalent units in the UK.

== Live performances and impact ==
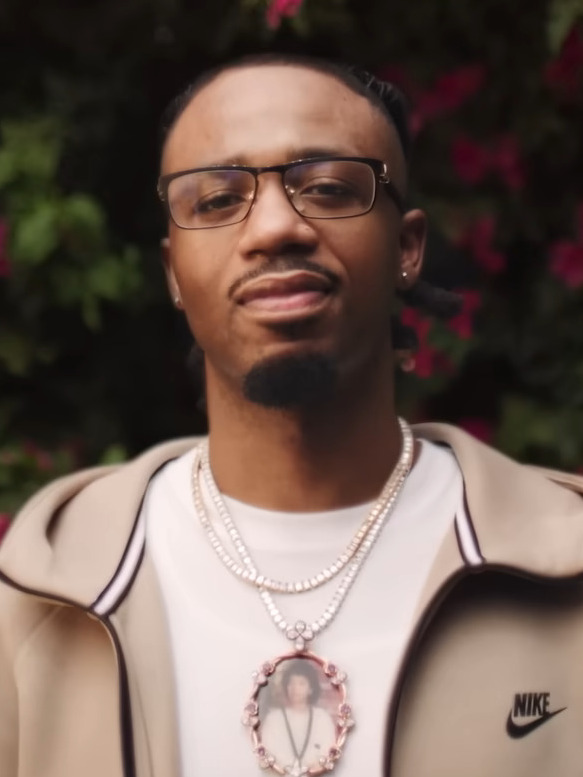
An internet meme spawned from the introduction to Metro Boomin on the song.

West first performed "Pt. 2" live at the Paradise International Music Festival in 2016. He sang a medley which included Kid Cudi's vocals from "Pt. 1" (a tribute for him, who was in rehab) over the instrumental of "Waves" on October 25, 2016, in Inglewood, California during the Saint Pablo Tour; HipHopDX shared a recording of the performance on Instagram. Chance the Rapper covered "Pt. 1" at the 2017 Governors Ball Music Festival, where he also covered the album tracks "Waves" and "Ultralight Beam". West and Kid Cudi unexpectedly performed "Pt. 1" in Los Angeles on August 17, 2018, in addition to "Ghost Town" from West's album Ye (2018). When West and Kid Cudi performed live at the 2018 Camp Flog Gnaw Carnival as Kids See Ghosts, they opened their set with "Pt. 1".

"Pt. 1" spawned a number of internet memes, including Future's tagline for producer Metro Boomin's entrance on the song: "If young Metro don't trust you I'm gon' shoot you." Due to the memes and the astounding acclaim for the production and his tagline, Metro Boomin went on to spawn several hit albums like Savage Mode, Heroes & Villains, and the double albums We Don't Trust You and We Still Don't Trust You with rapper Future while additionally curating and executively producing the soundtrack for Spider-Man: Across the Spider-Verse.

When Drake rapped "Duppy Freestyle" in May 2018, he referred to The Life of Pablo tracks "Pt. 1" and "30 Hours", and his West and Jay-Z-featuring single "Pop Style" as a poke at the rapper.

== Sunday Service Choir version ==
"Father Stretch"

Song by Sunday Service Choir

from the album Jesus Is Born
- Released: December 25, 2019
- Recorded: 2019
- Genre: Gospel
- Length: 5:52
- Label: INC
- Songwriters: As noted earlier; new lyric writers unknown

American gospel group Sunday Service Choir recorded a reinterpretation of "Pt. 1" under the title of "Father Stretch", with the reinterpretation being produced by West. "Father Stretch" was released on December 25, 2019, as the sixth track on Sunday Service Choir's debut studio album Jesus Is Born. The song brings back the beat of the original version, though it excludes the sexually explicit lyrics and includes more gospel elements. Particularly, the song has been noted for its exclusion of the original's "bleached asshole" lyrics. The refrain of the song demonstrates how far-reaching the love of God is, with the refrain comparing one's blessings to being "As countless as the stars." The comparison references the Abrahamic covenant that saw God make a promise to Abraham for as many descendants as there are stars.

=== Reception ===
"Father Stretch"
A 35-second sample of "Father Stretch", channelling the original's beat and adding more gospel elements.

"Father Stretch" was met with generally positive reviews from music critics, who mostly noted its development of "Pt. 1". The song was described by Bianca Gracie from Billboard as making the original version of it "even more captivating." Rhian Daly of NME cited the song as being among what draws fans of West into the album and called the song "perhaps obviously, radically different from what it once was," while noting the song as building on the T. L. Barrett sample. Similarly, Dean Van Nguyen from The Guardian listed the song as one of the most interesting parts of Jesus Is Born for West's fans and noted that it "develops the rap song's gospel overtures." ClashMusic's Laviea Thomas branded the song as a "distinctive" rendition of "Pt. 1". Neil Z. Yeung from AllMusic noted it for being a fresh take on the latter. In a mixed review, Daniel Bromfield from Spectrum Culture wrote that "the space on 'Father Stretch' where we expect to hear his famous bleached asshole line is gaping" and claimed that the song will only be preferred to the original by parents.

Commercially, "Father Stretch" experienced a minor reception. In the week of the album's release, the song debuted at number 20 on the US Billboard Gospel Songs chart. The song climbed ten places to number ten in its second week on the chart with 759,000 streams, becoming the highest charting track from Jesus Is Born. This gave Sunday Service Choir their first track to reach the top ten of the US Gospel Songs chart.

=== Credits and personnel ===
Credits are adapted from Tidal and may be incomplete because official liner notes for Jesus Is Born have not been released yet.

- Jason White – arranger
- Phil Cornish – arranger

== Personnel ==
Credits adapted from West's website:

=== Pt. 1 ===
- Production – Kanye West, Mike Dean #MWA for Dean's List Productions & Rick Rubin
- Co-production – Metro Boomin
- Additional production – DJDS, Allen Ritter & Noah Goldstein for Ark Productions, Inc
- Engineering – Noah Goldstein, Andrew Dawson, Anthony Kilhoffer, Mike Dean & Giandre Diaz
- Mix – Manny Marroquin at Larrabee Studios, North Hollywood, CA.
- Mix assisted – assisted by Chris Galland, Ike Schultz & Jeff Jackson
- Vocals – Kid Cudi & Kelly Price
- Keyboards & moog modular – Mike Dean

=== Pt. 2 ===
- Production – Kanye West, Menace & Rick Rubin
- Co-production – Plain Pat
- Additional production – Caroline Shaw
- Engineering – Noah Goldstein, Andrew Dawson, Anthony Kilhoffer & Mike Dean
- Mix – Manny Marroquin at Larrabee Studios, North Hollywood, CA.
- Mix assisted – assisted by Chris Galland, Ike Schultz & Jeff Jackson
- Vocals – Desiigner & Caroline Shaw

== Charts ==
=== Pt. 1 ===
==== Weekly charts ====
Chart performance for "Pt. 1"
Chart (2016)	Peak position
Canada Hot 100 (Billboard)	51
Ireland (IRMA)	74
Netherlands (Single Top 100)	97
New Zealand Heatseekers (RMNZ)	8
Sweden (Sverigetopplistan)	79
UK Singles (Official Charts)	54
UK Hip Hop/R&B (Official Charts)	10
US Billboard Hot 100	37
US Hot R&B/Hip-Hop Songs (Billboard)	14
US Rhythmic Airplay (Billboard)	10

2023–2024 chart performance for "Pt. 1"
Chart (2023–2024)	Peak position
Global 200 (Billboard)	145
Lithuania (AGATA)	78
New Zealand Catalogue Singles (RMNZ)	34
Portugal (AFP)	162

Chart performance for "Father Stretch"
Chart (2020)	Peak position
US Gospel Songs (Billboard)	10

==== Year-end charts ====
2016-year end chart performance for "Pt. 1"
Chart (2016)	Position
US Hot R&B/Hip-Hop Songs (Billboard)	39
US Rhythmic (Billboard)	46

=== Pt. 2 ===
==== Weekly charts ====
Chart performance for "Pt. 2"
Chart (2016)	Peak position
Canada Hot 100 (Billboard)	60
Ireland (IRMA)	87
Netherlands (Single Top 100)	100
Sweden (Sverigetopplistan)	95
UK Singles (Official Charts)	70
UK Hip Hop/R&B (Official Charts)	18
US Billboard Hot 100	54
US Hot R&B/Hip-Hop Songs (Billboard)	18

== Certifications ==
=== Pt. 1 ===
Certifications for "Pt. 1"
Region	Certification	Certified units/sales
Brazil (Pro-Música Brasil)	Platinum	60,000^{‡}
Denmark (IFPI Danmark)	Platinum	90,000^{‡}
France (SNEP)	Gold	100,000^{‡}
Italy (FIMI)	Gold	50,000^{‡}
New Zealand (RMNZ)	4× Platinum	120,000^{‡}
Poland (ZPAV)	Platinum	50,000^{‡}
Portugal (AFP)	Gold	5,000^{‡}
Spain (Promusicae)	Gold	30,000^{‡}
United Kingdom (BPI)	Platinum	600,000^{‡}
United States (RIAA)	7× Platinum	7,000,000^{‡}
^{‡} Sales+streaming figures based on certification alone.

=== Pt. 2 ===
Certifications for "Pt. 2"
Region	Certification	Certified units/sales
New Zealand (RMNZ)	Gold	15,000^{‡}
United Kingdom (BPI)	Silver	200,000^{‡}
United States (RIAA)	Platinum	1,000,000^{‡}
^{‡} Sales+streaming figures based on certification alone.

== Release history ==
Release dates and formats for "Father Stretch My Hands"
Region	Date	Format	Label	Ref.
United States	June 7, 2016	Rhythmic contemporary radio	GOOD; Def Jam	

== See also ==
- 2016 in hip hop music
- Panda (song)
