= Tiimmy Turner =

2016 single by Desiigner

Single by Desiigner
- Released: July 22, 2016; October 14, 2016 (Remix featuring Kanye West)
- Recorded: 2016
- Genre: Hip hop; trap
- Length: 3:59
- Label: GOOD; Def Jam
- Songwriters: Sidney Selby III; Mike Dean
- Producers: Dean; Desiigner

Desiigner singles chronology
"Champions" (2016)	"Tiimmy Turner" (2016)	"Gucci Snakes" (2016)

Kanye West singles chronology
"Ballin" (2016)	"Tiimmy Turner (remix)" (2016)	"Castro" (2016)

"Tiimmy Turner" is a song by American rapper Desiigner. It was released on July 22, 2016, for digital download by GOOD Music and Def Jam Recordings. The song was written and produced by Desiigner alongside Mike Dean. The official remix of the song, which features vocals and production from Kanye West as well as additional production from Nana Kwabena Tuffuor and Noah Goldstein, was also commercially released on October 14, 2016. The song was certified platinum by the Recording Industry Association of America (RIAA) in December 2016, for earning a million equivalent units in the United States.

"Tiimmy Turner" received critical acclaim, and was ranked at number 44 on Rolling Stone's "50 Best Songs of 2016" list.

== Background ==
Desiigner initially previewed "Tiimmy Turner" during his freestyle for XXL's "Freshmen Class of 2016". Shortly after, Desiigner shared a video of himself alongside longtime Kanye West-collaborator Mike Dean, working on the official version of the song. On July 21, 2016, Desiigner released the song on YouTube, then for digital download on the iTunes Store the next day.

== Commercial performance ==
"Tiimmy Turner" debuted at number 46 on the US Billboard Hot 100 for the chart issue dated August 13, 2016. "Tiimmy Turner" peaked at number 34 on the Hot 100, and number 38 on the Canadian Hot 100, becoming Desiigner's second top 40 entry in both countries.

== Song meaning ==
Timmy Turner is a character from the Nickelodeon animated series The Fairly OddParents, whose fairy godparents grant him wishes. In the context of this song, Timmy is a metaphor for Desiigner, the clue being the spelling of "Tiimmy" in the title. Desiigner explained in a video interview with All Def Digital:

Tiimmy Turner is me. I was referring to myself when I was saying I "was wishing for a burner." And [...] I was referring to a girl that, you know, would do anything for the fame [...] I know that my soul's in the furnace; because if I know that I wish for the burner, and she knows that she would do anything for the fame, you know you go to Hell. It's a storyline about little bit about my struggle and the pain I was feeling at the moment.

== Charts ==
=== Weekly charts ===
Chart (2016)	Peak position
Canada Hot 100 (Billboard)	38
France (SNEP)	174
New Zealand Heatseekers (Recorded Music NZ)	7
Portugal (AFP)	100
UK Singles (Official Charts)	136
US Billboard Hot 100	34
US Hot R&B/Hip-Hop Songs (Billboard)	10

=== Year-end charts ===
Chart (2016)	Position
US Billboard Hot 100	98
US Hot Rap Songs (Billboard)	20
US Hot R&B/Hip-Hop Songs (Billboard)	36

== Certifications ==
Region	Certification	Certified units/sales
Brazil (Pro-Música Brasil)	Gold	30,000^{‡}
Denmark (IFPI Danmark)	Gold	45,000^{‡}
France (SNEP)	Gold	66,666^{‡}
Italy (FIMI)	Gold	25,000^{‡}
New Zealand (RMNZ)	Gold	15,000^{‡}
United Kingdom (BPI)	Silver	200,000^{‡}
United States (RIAA)	Platinum	1,000,000^{‡}
^{‡} Sales+streaming figures based on certification alone.
