= Get Big (album) =

Studio album by Dorrough
- Released: September 7, 2010
- Recorded: 2009–10
- Genre: Hip hop
- Length: 60:38
- Label: Prime Time; NGenius; E1
- Producer: Dorrough (exec.); Nitti; Big E; Q. Smith; Ced L. Young; DJ Toomp; Mouse; Raw Smoov; Todd Hamburger; 2Much; Recka

Dorrough chronology
Dorrough Music (2009)	Get Big (2010)	Ride Wit Me (2017)

Singles from Get Big
- 1. "Hood Chick Fetish" Released: April 27, 2010; 2. "Get Big" Released: June 8, 2010

Get Big is the second studio album by American rapper Dorrough, released on September 7, 2010. The album sold 5,500 copies during its first week. The album sold 18,000 copies in the United States.

== Singles ==
- The album lead single "Hood Bitch Fetish" featuring Yo Gotti, was released on April 27, 2010.
- The album's title track and second single "Get Big", was released on June 8, 2010.

=== Promotion singles ===
- The album's promotional single "I Want (Hood Christmas Anthem)", was released on December 3, 2009.
- The album's second promotional single "Number 23", was released on January 26, 2009.

Professional ratings
Review scores
Source	Rating
Allmusic	3.5/5 stars
HipHopDX	2/5 stars
RapReviews	(6/10)
The Smoking Section	3/5 stars

== Track listing ==
No.	Title	Writer(s)	Producer(s)	Length
1.	"Sold Out"	Dorwin Dorrough, Gavin Luckett	Gavin "G-Luck" Luckett	3:33
2.	"Get Big" (featuring Nitti)	Dorrough, Chadron Moore, Tiffany Johnson	Nitti	3:45
3.	"M.I.A."	Dorrough, Elimu Tabasuri	Big E	4:02
4.	"Get 'Em Live" (featuring Jim Jones)	Dorrough, Joseph Jones II, Jessie Caldwell	Da New Kidd, T-Tum	3:57
5.	"Skit" (featuring Lil Duval)	Roland Powell		1:07
6.	"Hell of a Night"	Dorrough, Quamecia Leonard, Lequinston Smith	Q. Smith, DJ Toomp (co.), Ced L. Young (add.)	3:56
7.	"In the Morning"	Dorrough, Tomeka Gantt, Zachary Whittlesey	DJ White Chocolate, Frado (co.)	4:14
8.	"Handcuffs" (featuring Slim Thug)	Dorrough, Jeremy Allen, Stayve Thomas	Mouse	4:04
9.	"Breakfast in Bed" (featuring Ray J)	Dorrough, Willie Norwood, Jr., Dee Sonaram, Jacob Tupulo	Raw Smoov	3:32
10.	"Ahh Yeah"	Dorrough, Allen	Mouse	3:56
11.	"Hood Bitch Fetish" (featuring Yo Gotti)	Dorrough, Demetrius Davis, Mario Mimms	Ensayne Wayne, Phyngarelli "Boss of Beats"	4:25
12.	"Freaky" (featuring Tomeka Pearl)	Dorrough, Gantt, Quorey Speights	Q.Redd, Dorrough (add.)	3:49
13.	"Trouble"	Dorrough, Ryan Norris	Todd Hamburger	4:42
14.	"My Name"	Dorrough, Britney Jackson, Moore	Nitti	3:48
15.	"Si Si I Like"	Dorrough, Reuben Proctor	2Much	3:28
16.	"Way Better" (featuring Juvenile)	Dorrough, Tommy Darnell, Terius Gray	Recka, Big Korey (co.)	4:20

iTunes Store bonus tracks
No.	Title	Producer(s)	Length
17.	"Number 23"	T-Mix	3:59
18.	"Hood Chick Fetish" (Instrumental)	Ensayne Wayne, Phyngarelli "Boss of Beats"	4:24
19.	"Get Big" (Instrumental)	Nitti	3:44
