= Champions (GOOD Music song) =

2016 collaborative rap single

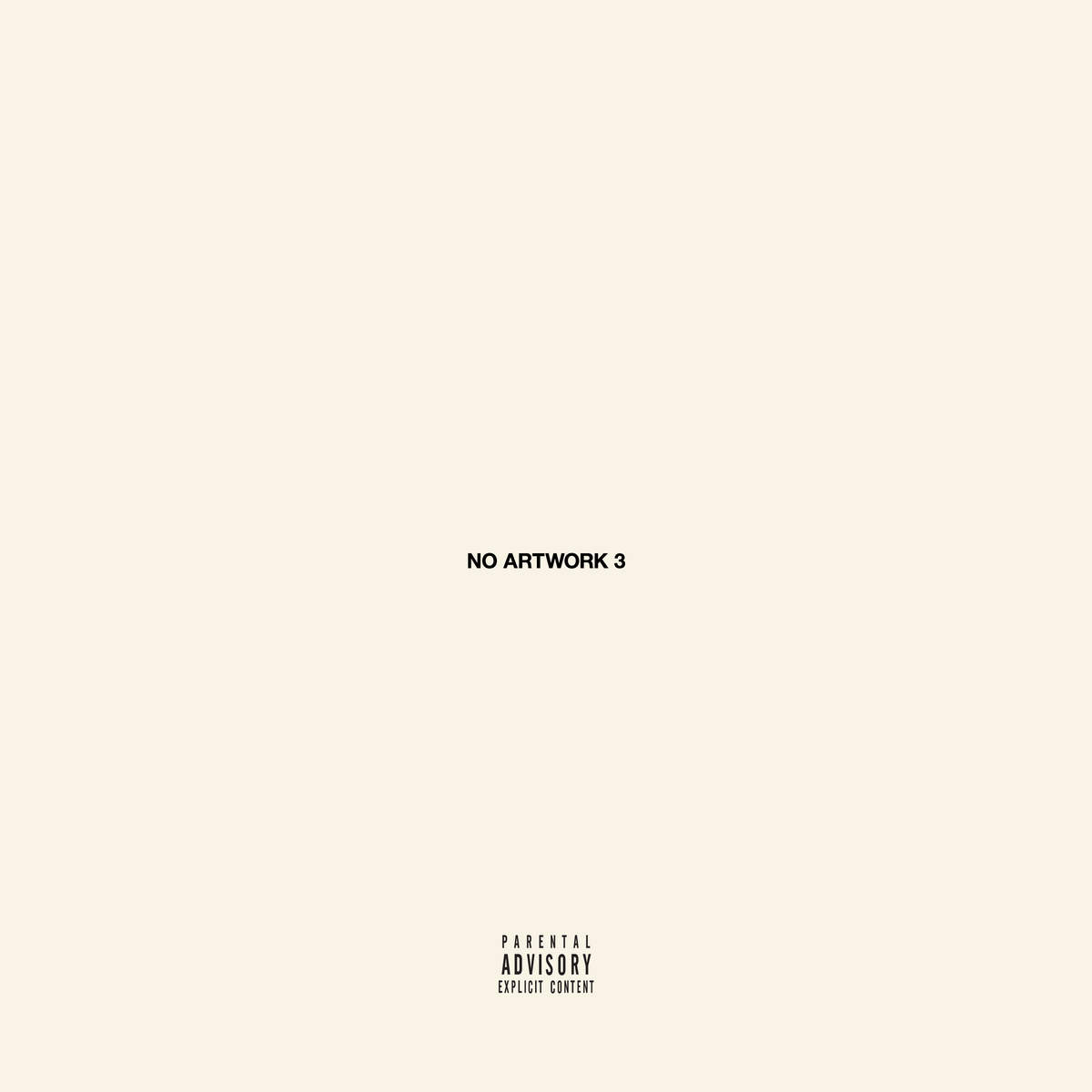

Single by Kanye West, Gucci Mane, Big Sean, 2 Chainz, Travis Scott, Yo Gotti, Quavo, and Desiigner

from the album Cruel Winter (intended)
- Released: June 7, 2016
- Recorded: 2016
- Genre: Hip hop; trap
- Length: 5:34
- Label: GOOD; Def Jam
- Songwriters: Kanye West; Radric Davis; Sean Anderson; Tauheed Epps; Jacques Webster II; Mario Mims; Quavious Marshall; Sidney Selby III; Alain Macklovitch; Lexus Lewis; Michael Dean; Noah Goldstein; Derek Watkins
- Producers: Kanye West; Mike Dean; Low Pros; Derek Watkins (co.); Charlie Heat (co.); Noah Goldstein (add.)

Kanye West singles chronology
"Father Stretch My Hands" (2016)	"Champions" (2016)	"Friends" (2016)

Gucci Mane singles chronology
"Back on Road" (2016)	"Champions" (2016)	"All My Children" (2016)

Big Sean singles chronology
"Play No Games" (2015)	"Champions" (2016)	"Holy Key" (2016)

2 Chainz singles chronology
"No Problem" (2016)	"Champions" (2016)	"Big Amount" (2016)

Travis Scott singles chronology
"Pick Up the Phone" (2016)	"Champions" (2016)	"Goosebumps" (2016)

Yo Gotti singles chronology
"Order More" (2016)	"Champions" (2016)	"Better" (2016)

Quavo singles chronology
"Pick Up the Phone" (2016)	"Champions" (2016)	"Castro" (2016)

Desiigner singles chronology
"Panda" (2015)	"Champions" (2016)	"Tiimmy Turner" (2016)

GOOD Music singles chronology
"Clique" (2012)	"Champions" (2016)

"Champions" is a song by American rappers Kanye West, Gucci Mane, Big Sean, 2 Chainz, Travis Scott, Yo Gotti, Quavo, and Desiigner. It was originally intended to be released as the lead single from the scrapped GOOD Music compilation album Cruel Winter. The song was produced by West alongside Low Pros and Mike Dean, with co-production from Derek Watkins and Charlie Heat, and additional production from Noah Goldstein. A freestyle video was released by Teyana Taylor in September 2016.

== Release ==
"Champions" was first aired on Big Boy's 92.3. Kanye West later released the song as the first single from Cruel Winter. The single was untitled at the time, with "Round and Round" and "Champions" being used as working titles. It was officially released to iTunes on June 12, 2016.

== Critical reception ==
The song was placed at number 49 on Complex's list of 2016's best songs.

== Chart performance ==
On the chart dated July 2, 2016, "Champions" entered the US Billboard Hot 100 at number 71, powered by first-week digital download sales of 31,000 copies and it debuted at number 7 on the US Hot R&B/Hip-Hop Singles Sales chart. On May 15, 2018, the song was certified platinum by the Recording Industry Association of America (RIAA) for selling over one million digital copies in the United States.

== Freestyle video ==
Teyana Taylor released a video of her freestyling over the track on September 6, 2016. The video is a stop-motion clip that sees Taylor covered in smeared gold paint and dancing militaristically in front of a gray backdrop. It marked Taylor's first video since she starred in the music video for West's single "Fade".

== Personnel ==
Credits adapted from Tidal.

- Kanye West – vocals, production
- Gucci Mane – vocals
- Big Sean – vocals
- 2 Chainz – vocals
- Travis Scott – vocals
- Yo Gotti – vocals
- Quavo – vocals, recording engineer
- Desiigner – vocals
- A-Trak – production
- Lex Luger – production
- Mike Dean – production, bass guitar, keyboards, drum programming, recording engineer, mixing
- Fonzworth Bentley – co-production
- Charlie Heat – co-production
- Noah Goldstein – additional production, recording engineer
- Finis "KY" White – recording engineer
- Maximilian Jaeger – recording engineer
- Gregg Rominiecki – recording engineer
- Thomas Goff – recording engineer
- William J. Sullivan – assistant recording engineer
- Kez Khou – mix assistance

== Charts ==
Chart performance for "Champions"
Chart (2016)	Peak position
Canada Hot 100 (Billboard)	73
UK Hip Hop/R&B (Official Charts)	24
UK Singles (Official Charts)	128
US Billboard Hot 100	71
US Hot R&B/Hip-Hop Songs (Billboard)	22

== Certifications ==
Certifications for "Champions"
Region	Certification	Certified units/sales
Denmark (IFPI Danmark)	Gold	45,000^{‡}
New Zealand (RMNZ)	Gold	15,000^{‡}
United Kingdom (BPI)	Silver	200,000^{‡}
United States (RIAA)	Platinum	1,000,000^{‡}
^{‡} Sales+streaming figures based on certification alone.
