= Afterparty (album) =

Studio album by Cool Kids of Death
- Released: 18 April 2008
- Recorded: 2007–08
- Genre: Alternative rock
- Length: 37:50
- Label: Agora SA/ Chaos Management Group
- Producer: Kamil Łazikowski, Marcin Kowalski

Cool Kids of Death chronology
2006 (2006)	Afterparty (2008)

Professional ratings
Review scores
Source	Rating
Porcys	(5.5/10)

Afterparty is the fourth album of Polish alternative rock group Cool Kids of Death. It was released on 18 April 2008. The first single from the album "Nagle zapomnieć wszystko" was released on the band's official MySpace page on March 23, 2008. The music video directed by Krzysztof Ostrowski was filmed in early April in Łódź. It was partly influenced by Arthur Brown art.

== Track listing ==
1. "Mamo, mój komputer jest zepsuty" (Jakub Wandachowicz) – 2:52 (Mom, my computer is broken)
2. "Afterparty" (Kamil Lazikowski, Wandachowicz) – 2:14
3. "Bal sobowtórów" (Marcin Kowalski, Krzysztof Ostrowski) – 3:14 (Lookalikes ball)
4. "Leżeć" (Kowalski, Lazikowski, Ostrowski) – 3:22 (Lay down)
5. "Nagle zapomnieć wszystko" (Kowalski, Wojciech Michalec, Wandachowicz) – 3:05 (To forget everything suddenly)
6. "Biec" (Kowalski, Wandachowicz) – 3:34 (To run)
7. "Bezstronny obserwator" (Kowalski, Ostrowski, Wandachowicz) – 4:21
8. "Mężczyźni bez amunicji" (Kowalski, Ostrowski) – 2:59 (Men without ammunition)
9. "Ciągle jestem sam" (Wandachowicz) – 2:43 (I'm still alone)
10. "Joy" (Kowalski, Ostrowski) – 2:47
11. "TV Panika" (Kowalski, Lazikowski, Wandachowicz) – 2:40 (TV panic)
12. "Ruin gruz" (Kowalski, Kamil Lazikowski, Jakub Wandachowicz) – 3:58 (The ruins' debris)

== Personnel ==
- Krzysztof Ostrowski – vocals
- Jakub Wandachowicz – bass
- Marcin Kowalski – guitar
- Łukasz Klaus – drums
- Kamil Łazikowski – keyboard, computer effects
- Wojciech Michalec – guitar
