= Dorrough Music =

Studio album by Dorrough
- Released: August 4, 2009
- Recorded: 2008–09
- Genre: Hip hop
- Length: 61:33
- Label: NGenius; Prime Time; E1
- Producer: 2Much; Big Korey; DJ Montay; G-Luck; Joe Blow Da CEO; Mr. Rogers; Q. Smith; Recka Beats; Todd Hamburger; Woodknock Productions

Dorrough chronology
Dorrough Music (2009)	Get Big (2010)

Singles from Dorrough Music
- 1. "Ice Cream Paint Job" Released: March 24, 2009; 2. "Walk That Walk" Released: April 7, 2009; 3. "Wired to the T" Released: October 6, 2009

Dorrough Music is the debut studio album by American rapper Dorrough. It was released on August 4, 2009, by NGenius Entertainment, Prime Time Click and E1 Music. The album was supported by the singles: "Ice Cream Paint Job", "Walk That Walk" and "Wired to the T". The album debuted at number 36 on the US Billboard 200, selling 13,000 copies in the first-week.

== Critical reception ==
Professional ratings
Review scores
Source	Rating
AllMusic	3/5 stars
HipHopDX	2.5/5 stars
RapReviews	7/10

Dorrough Music received mixed reviews from music critics. Steve 'Flash' Juon of RapReviews said he saw potential in Dorrough with his organic delivery and personal take with the listeners resembling that of fellow Texas MC Scarface. AllMusic's David Jeffries found the album filled with samey tracks compared to the first two singles, average witty lyricism and Dorrough's bland vocal delivery, concluding that "Fans who like their hip-hop Lone Star State-big will find the rough edges easy to ignore. Everyone else should focus on the singles, which are satisfying in any territory. " Mitchell Hanna of HipHopDX said that, "Despite his aptitude for success, his unmemorable and often undistinguishable style; lukewarm lyricism; and relatively low industry support, leave Dorrough with plenty of room for improvement for his sophomore album."

== Track listing ==
No.	Title	Producer(s)	Length
1.	"Boy, I Grind"	Todd Hamburger	4:13
2.	"Ice Cream Paint Job"	2Much	3:57
3.	"She Ain't Got It All" (featuring Lil' Flip)	Joe Blow Da CEO	4:09
4.	"Hood Song" (featuring Tomeka Pearl)	Woodknock Productions	4:11
5.	"Flashout" (featuring Mista Mac)	Q. Smith	3:45
6.	"Never Changed" (featuring Tomeka Pearl)	Todd Hamburger	4:29
7.	"Feel This Way"	Todd Hamburger	3:36
8.	"Piece & Chain Swangin'" (featuring Slim Thug)	DJ Montay; Big Korey	4:22
9.	"This Time You Was Wrong"	Todd Hamburger	4:20
10.	"Walk That Walk"	Mr. Rogers	3:49
11.	"Wired to the T"	2Much	3:22
12.	"Trunk Bang" (featuring Tum Tum)	Todd Hamburger	4:40
13.	"What's My Ringtone" (featuring Tomeka Pearl)	Recka Beats	4:07
14.	"A Whole Lotta" (featuring Milo)	G-Luck	4:00
15.	"Caramel Sundae" (featuring Fat B)	Q. Smith	4:27
Total length:			61:33

== Charts ==
Chart (2009)	Peak position
US Billboard 200	36
US Top R&B/Hip-Hop Albums (Billboard)	6
US Top Rap Albums (Billboard)	2
