= New English (mixtape) =

Mixtape by Desiigner
- Released: June 26, 2016
- Recorded: 2015–2016
- Genre: Hip hop; trap
- Length: 35:55
- Label: GOOD; Def Jam
- Producer: Zana Ray (exec.); Steven Victor (exec.); Mike Dean (also co-exec.); Mekado; Hal Ritson; Richard Adlam; NickFRSH; YsOnnaTrack; Richie Souf; Rico Beats; IGNORVNCE; @TheShellGod; Menace; Salman Abdi; Maaly Raw; EManOnTheTrack

Desiigner chronology
New English (2016)	L.O.D. (2018)

Singles from New English
- 1. "Panda" Released: December 15, 2015

New English is the debut mixtape by American rapper Desiigner. It was released on June 26, 2016, by GOOD Music and Def Jam Recordings. New English features guest appearances from Pusha T, King Savage and Mekado. The mixtape's lead single: "Panda" was released on December 15, 2015. In early-May 2016, that single reached the top of the US Billboard Hot 100.

== Background ==
On April 12, 2016, in an interview with Billboard, Desiigner first announced that the title of the mixtape would be called Trap History Month. However, the mixtape was formally announced on June 22, 2016, with the new title to the mixtape called New English, when he premiered it at a Tidal-sponsored listening party in New York City. Although no release date was provided at that time, Desiigner released the mixtape just four days later, exclusively through Tidal's streaming service. It was later released into the iTunes Store and Spotify later that day. The tracks were eventually uploaded to YouTube.

== Singles ==
The debut single from the mixtape, "Panda", was released on December 15, 2015. The track was produced by Menace. On May 7, 2016, that single reached the top of the US Billboard Hot 100, where it stayed for two consecutive weeks.

== Reception ==
Professional ratings
Aggregate scores
Source	Rating
Metacritic	60/100
Review scores
Source	Rating
AllMusic	3.5/5 stars
HipHopDX	3.2/5
HotNewHipHop	5.8/10
Pitchfork	4.7/10
Rhyme Junkie	8/10
Spin	5/10
XXL	6/10

The mixtape received mixed reviews from music critics. The mixtape was praised for its production but criticized for its lack of originality, unfinished nature and Desiigner's own performance on the project. Matthew Ramirez of Pitchfork said about the album, "It sounds like the last five years of hip-hop watered down."

== Commercial performance ==
In the United States, New English debuted at number 22 on the Billboard 200, with 13 million streams of its songs, which account for 56% of the 16,000 album-equivalent units according to Billboard.

== Track listing ==
No.	Title	Writer(s)	Producer(s)	Length
1.	"Intro"	Sidney Selby III		0:37
2.	"Caliber"	Selby III; Nicholas McAlmont	NickFRSH	2:03
3.	"Make It Out"	Selby III; Salman Abdi; Khalil King	EmanOnTheTrack	2:49
4.	"Shooters"	Selby III; King	Mekado	1:28
5.	"Monstas & Villains"	Selby III; Tayvon Harper	YsOnnaTrack	3:46
6.	"Interlude 1"		Hal Ritson; Richard Adlam	0:24
7.	"Talk Regardless"	Selby III; Tony Son	Richie Souf	3:08
8.	"Roll Wit Me"	Selby III; Ricardo Lamarre	Rico Beats	2:48
9.	"Interlude 2"		Ritson; Adlam	0:59
10.	"Da Day" (featuring Mekado)	Selby III; King; Jamaal Henry; Mike Dean	Mekado; Maaly Raw; Dean^{[a]}	6:45
11.	"Jet" (featuring Pusha T)	Selby III; Terrell Graham; Terrence Thornton	IGNORVNCE	3:32
12.	"Overnight"	Selby III; Dean	Dean	3:11
13.	"Zombie Walk" (featuring King Savage)	Selby III; Shawn Gilchrist	@TheShellGod	3:28
14.	"Panda"	Selby III; Adnan Khan	Menace	4:06
Total length:				35:55

Notes

- ^{^[a]} signifies a co-producer

Sample credits

- "Caliber" contains a sample of "Think (About It)" performed by Lyn Collins.

== Charts ==
Chart (2016)	Peak position
Belgian Albums (Ultratop Flanders)	148
Canadian Albums (Billboard)	33
Danish Albums (Hitlisten)	38
French Albums (SNEP)	169
US Billboard 200	22
US Top R&B/Hip-Hop Albums (Billboard)	14
