= Dorrough =

American rapper (born 1986)

Dorrough Music
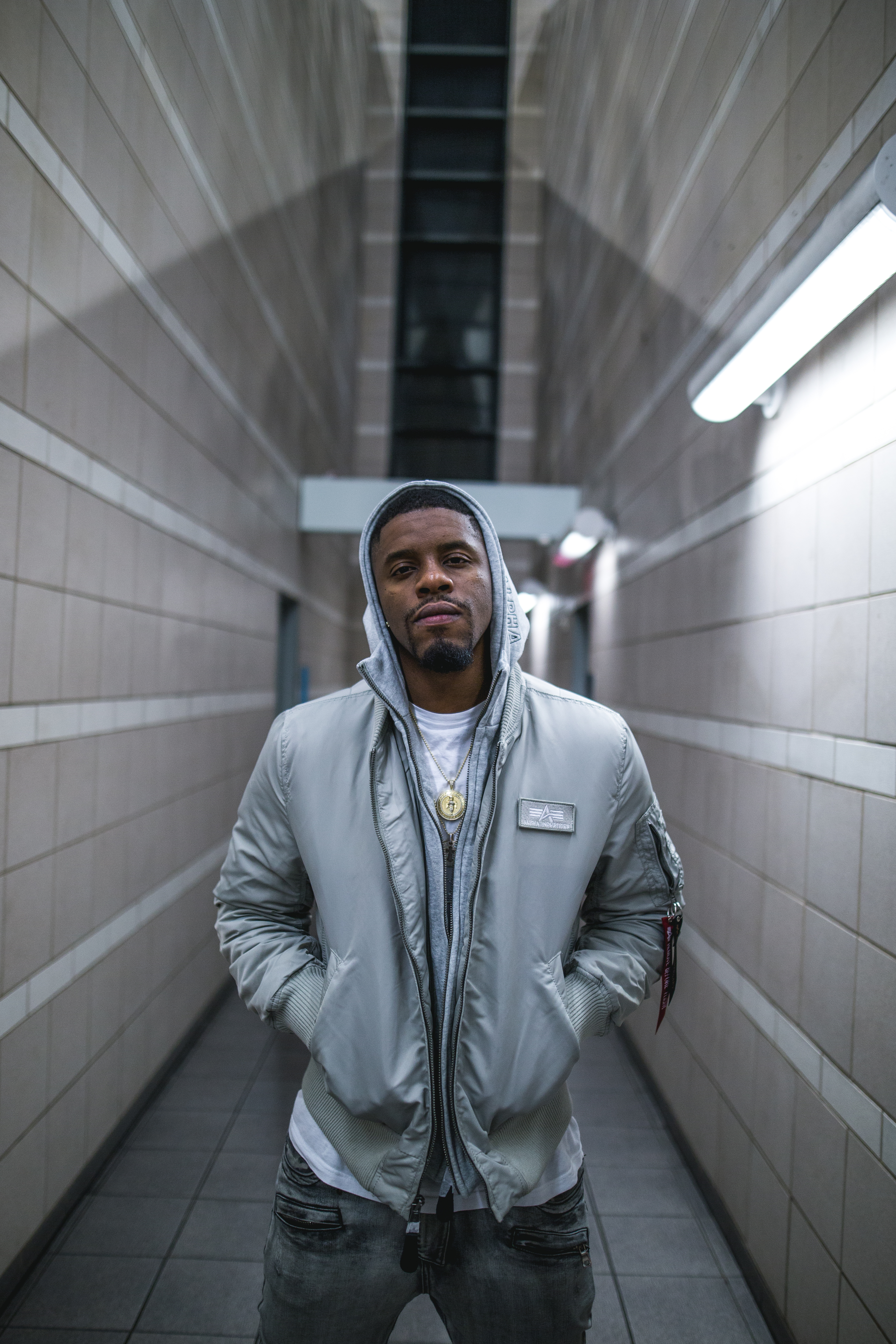
- Dorrough in 2016

Background information
- Also known as: Six 3
- Born: Dorwin Demarcus Dorrough; October 28, 1986 (age 39); Dallas, Texas, United States
- Genres: Hip hop
- Occupations: Rapper; songwriter
- Years active: 2003–present
- Labels: NGenius; Prime Time Click eOne Music

Dorwin Demarcus Dorrough (born October 28, 1986), known professionally as Dorrough Music (or simply Dorrough), is an American rapper and songwriter. His singles include "Walk That Walk", "Get Big", "Ice Cream Paint Job", and "Beat Up the Block". He has produced a series of 6 mixtapes (including three with Gangsta Grillz) and 2 studio albums. With "Ice Cream Paint Job" being his only single to reach the Billboard Hot 100 chart, he was ranked as the 48th best one-hit wonder of the 2000s decade by Rolling Stone in May 2025.

== Early life ==
Dorrough Music was born in Dallas, Texas, United States, at Baylor Hospital. Being the youngest of eleven kids, at the age of 7, he developed a strong interest in basketball and played the sport until he was 18. Although he had a love for music, it was not until high school that he developed an interest in creating and writing music, in which he started off mixing mixtapes for close friends that were rappers until he discovered his own talent as a writer and performer. He attended Lancaster High School in Lancaster, where he was captain of the basketball team and became popular from playing his music at games and selling mixtapes during school hours. He also attended Prairie View A&M University where he gained regional stardom through building a student fan base that spread throughout the south, though he did not graduate.

== Music career ==
=== 2008–2009: Dorrough Music ===
Dorrough Music started his musical career giving out mixtapes at basketball games at his high school. His first single, "Walk That Walk", reached 28 on the Hot R&B/Hip-Hop Songs chart and 12 on the Hot Rap Tracks chart. His second single, "Ice Cream Paint Job", was his first to reach the Billboard Hot 100, reaching number 27. His debut album, Dorrough Music, was released on E1 Music August 4, 2009 and the album peaked at #36 on the Billboard 200, 6 on the Top R&B/Hip-Hop Albums, and 2 on the Top Rap Albums. After the success of the second single, "Ice Cream Paint Job", a remix was recorded. On August 18, 2009, the remix was released. It featured Soulja Boy, Rich Boy, Jermaine Dupri, Jim Jones, Slim Thug and E-40.

=== 2010: Get Big ===
Dorrough Music released two promo singles for his Get Big album: "I Want (Hood Christmas Anthem)" on December 3, 2009 and "Number 23" on January 26, 2010. He also released two official singles: "Hood Bitch Fetish" featuring Yo Gotti and "Get Big". The album was released on September 7, 2010. In 2012, he was featured on a song by E-40 called "I'm Doing It", which appears as a bonus track on E-40's 16th studio album, The Block Brochure: Welcome to the Soil 2.

=== 2010: Gangsta Grillz: Number 23 ===
Dorrough Music released an 18-song mixtape with DJ Drama featuring Yo Gotti, Shawty Lo, Slim Thug, Oj Tha Juiceman, Diamond and more.

=== 2011: Gangsta Grillz: Code Red ===
Dorrough Music released a 15-song mixtape with DJ Drama with no features.

=== 2011: Gangsta Grillz: Silent Assassin ===
Dorrough Music released a 19-song mixtape with DJ Drama featuring 2 Chainz, Yo Gotti, Nipsey Hussle Jim Jones, Travis Porter, Trae The Truth, Slim Thug, Diamond and more.

=== 2012: Highlights ===
Dorrough Music released a 19-song Mixtape with DJ Ill Will featuring Nipsey Hussle, Twista, E-40, Kid Ink, YG, Yo Gotti, Ace Hood, Wale, Juvenile, Paul Wall, Bun B, Lil Duval, Yung Nation, Maino, and more.

=== 2013: Shut The City Down ===
Dorrough Music released an 18-song Mixtape with Dj Smallz, Dj Scream, & Dj Mr. Rogers featuring Juicy J, Rocko, French Montana, Kevin Gates, Kid Ink, Problem, Kirko Bangz, Chevy Woods, Z-Ro, Snow Tha Product, Waka Flocka, Shawty Lo, Trae The Truth, and more.

=== 2015: Shut The City Down 2 ===
Dorrough Music released a 14-song Mixtape with Dj Skee & Dj Base featuring Lil Boosie, Too Short, Riff Raff, Young Dolph, Chamillionaire, Beatking, Peewee Longway and more.

== Awards ==
- 2009 BET Hip Hop Awards: Nominated for Best New Artist, Video of the Year, & Viewers Choice
- 2010 Ascap Awards: Song Writers Award
- 2010 SEA Awards: Independent Artist of the Year
- 2008 PV Choice Awards: Rapper of the Year

== Discography ==
- Dorrough Music (2009)
- Get Big (2010)
- Ride wit Me (2017)
- The Jump Back (2018)
