= Desiigner =

American rapper and singer (born 1997)

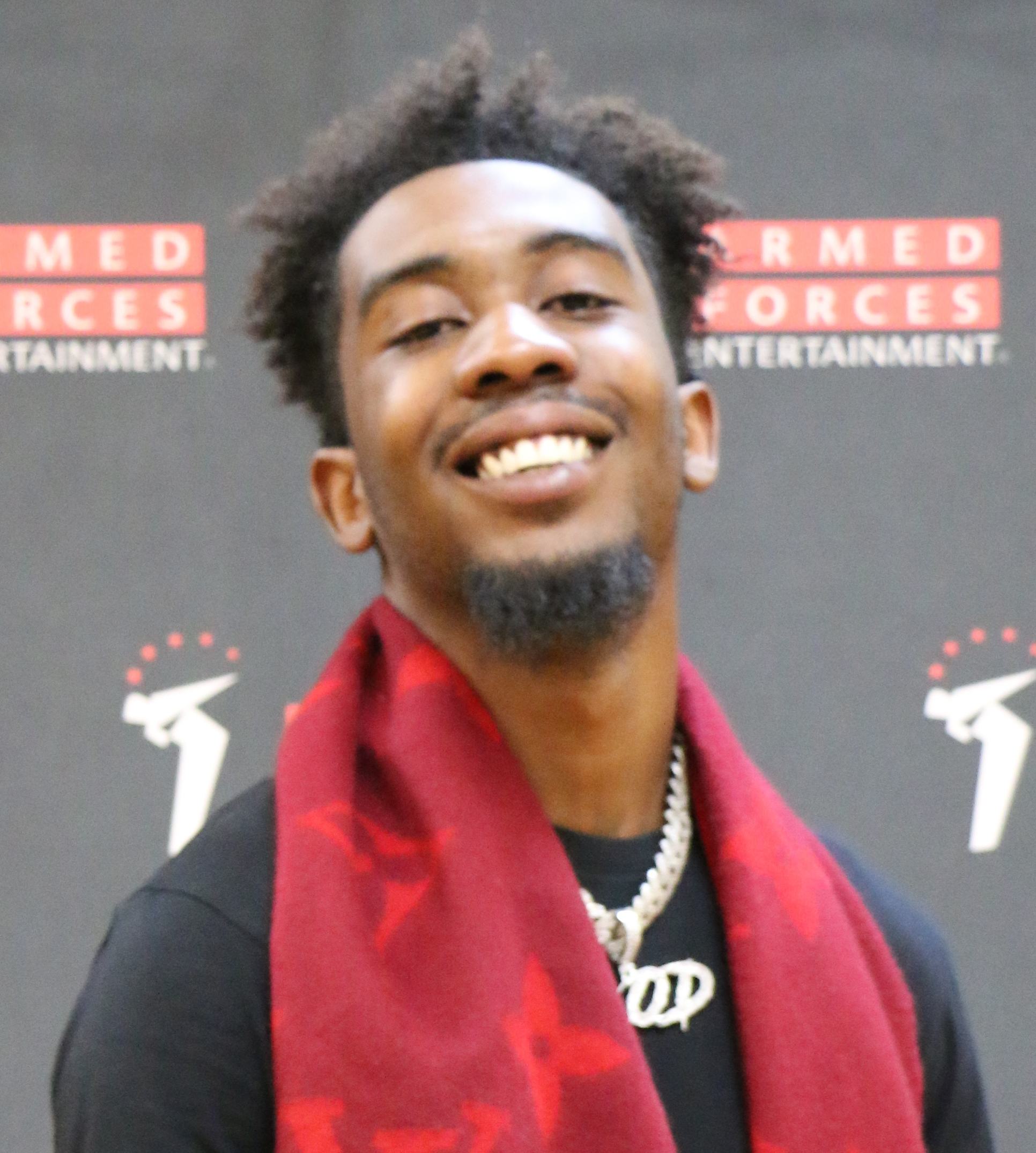
- Desiigner in 2019

Background information
- Also known as: Dezol; Designer Royel
- Born: Sidney Royel Selby III; May 3, 1997 (age 29); Brooklyn, New York City, U.S.
- Genres: East Coast hip-hop; trap; mumble rap
- Occupations: Rapper; singer; songwriter
- Works: Desiigner discography
- Years active: 2015–present
- Labels: Riveting Music; Life of Desiigner; GOOD; Def Jam
- Children: 1
- Relatives: Guitar Crusher (grandfather)

Sidney Royel Selby III (born May 3, 1997), better known by his stage name Desiigner, is an American rapper and singer. He is best known for his 2015 debut single "Panda", which topped the Billboard Hot 100. Shortly after the song gained viral status online, he signed with Kanye West's GOOD Music, an imprint of Def Jam Recordings. The track served as the lead single for his debut mixtape, New English (2016), which had modest commercial success.

His 2016 follow-up single, "Tiimmy Turner", peaked at number 34 on the Billboard Hot 100. In 2017, he was featured on the remix of South Korean boy band BTS' single "Mic Drop", which peaked at number 28 on the Hot 100. After releasing his debut EP, L.O.D., in 2018, Desiigner parted ways with both GOOD and Def Jam in 2019.

Despite having three top-40 hits in the United States, Desiigner is frequently described as a one-hit wonder.

== Early life ==
Sidney Royel Selby III was born on May 3, 1997, in Brooklyn. He is of Afro-Barbadian and African American descent, and is the grandson of blues musician Sidney "Guitar Crusher" Selby. He grew up in the Louis Armstrong housing projects in the Bedford–Stuyvesant neighborhood. He began practicing vocals at school choir and church. At the age of 14, he embarked on his musical career.

== Career ==
Desiigner embarked on his music career under his original nickname Dezolo, before he began releasing his work under the alias of Designer Royel, especially with Royel (his middle name). His sister Sierra convinced him to drop the "Royel" part and then keep the "Designer" part as his new stage name, doubling the "I"'s. On December 3, 2015, under his new pseudonym, Desiigner released his debut track, called "Zombie Walk". The song was produced by The Shell God. On December 15, 2015, Desiigner released another single, "Panda" on SoundCloud. The song released on iTunes five days later, before being re-released as his commercial debut single in February 2016. On February 11, 2016, Desiigner signed a recording contract with Kanye West's record label GOOD Music, an imprint of Def Jam Recordings. In the same month, Desiigner appeared on two songs by West — "Pt. 2" (which features an interpolation of "Panda") and "Freestyle 4" — from his seventh album The Life of Pablo. The following month, Desiigner was enlisted to perform at the South by Southwest (SXSW) music festival in 2016. In an interview with Billboard, Desiigner confirmed the release of his first upcoming mixtape, titled Trap History Month.

On May 5, 2016, producer Mike Dean announced that he would be serving as the executive producer for Desiigner's upcoming debut studio album. On May 24, Desiigner later announced that the title to his upcoming debut album would be called The Life of Desiigner. In June 2016, XXL revealed their annual "Freshmen Class" for 2016, and Desiigner was included on the list with nine other new artists. In June 2016, "Champions" was released as the lead single from the GOOD Music's ultimately shelved compilation album, Cruel Winter. Desiigner made a guest appearance on the song along with West, Gucci Mane, Big Sean, 2 Chainz, Travis Scott, Yo Gotti, and Quavo. In the same month, Desiigner made his US television debut, when he performed his single, "Panda" at the 2016 BET Awards. On June 26, 2016, Desiigner released his first full-length mixtape, titled New English on Tidal, following a live premiere of the mixtape on June 22. In July 2016, American singer Demi Lovato brought out Desiigner at their concert in New York. On July 21, 2016, Desiigner premiered his follow up single, "Tiimmy Turner", which was released as a single on iTunes the next day. The song peaked within the top 40 of the Billboard Hot 100. Desiigner appeared as a special guest on the Netflix series Bill Nye Saves the World. On November 7, 2017, it was reported that BTS would release a remix of their song "Mic Drop" featuring Desiigner and remixed by Steve Aoki. It was set to be released on November 17, 2017, but was postponed and released on November 24, 2017, instead.

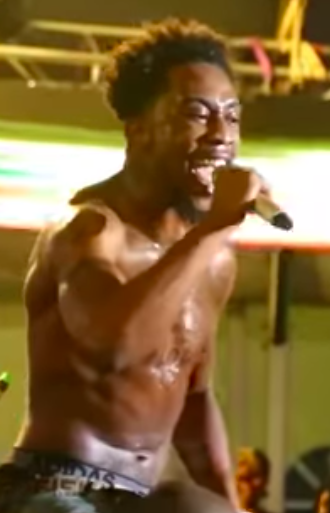
Desiigner performing in 2018

On May 3, 2018, Desiigner announced on social media that his debut extended play (EP), L.O.D., would be released at midnight on May 4, 2018. Upon release, it peaked at number 161 on the Billboard 200 and became his second and final project on a major label. The EP's namesake was utilized for his own label, LOD Records, through which he released his 2020 single, "Diva" independently.

In a 2022 interview with VladTV, Desiigner explained why he left GOOD Music in 2019, saying he was "going through a little mental thing" including his father having been comatose, and had tried to contact Kanye and his other labelmates for guidance but didn't receive any.

On the morning of November 1, 2022, Desiigner went to Instagram Live saying "I'm done rapping," after hearing the news of Migos rapper Takeoff's death from a shooting in Houston, Texas, that same morning. However, he returned to doing so on November 26 when he released the song "My Brodie", accompanied with a music video. Desiigner has remained active in the rap business since.

== Legal issues ==
On September 8, 2016, Desiigner and three other people were arrested in New York City, after a 911 caller claimed that he pulled a gun on them. Desiigner was later found in an SUV with four other people and the vehicle was searched. The police allegedly found oxycodone and guns, for which he and the other individuals received drug and weapon charges. They were all detained in custody. On September 10, 2016, his felony gun charge was dropped by prosecutors. He was cleared of the charges on September 12, 2016, when it was found that the pills were anabolic steroids belonging to his driver.

In April 2023, Desiigner was charged with indecent exposure after allegedly being caught on a Delta Air Lines flight masturbating in front of flight attendants while travelling from Tokyo to Minneapolis, Minnesota. He later posted an apology on social media for the incident and claimed he would be checking himself into a facility for mental health treatment.

In March 2026, Desiigner was arrested for domestic violence in Horry County, South Carolina. He was released on $1,500 bond. In July 2026, he was arrested in Horry County again for one count of domestic violence and two counts of property damage. He was given a $1,500 bond for one of the property damage charges and no bond for the other charges.

== Musical style ==
Desiigner's musical style is influenced by Southern hip hop, namely trap music which originated in Atlanta, Georgia. His rapping technique and vocals have been heavily compared to that of Atlanta-based rapper Future. When asked about the frequent comparisons, he told Complex: "God gave him a blessing, but he gave me a blessing too. I ain't gonna doubt the man's music. He makes beautiful music too. Music is made every day. Big ups to him, big ups to Future. I actually like Future's music. I like his music, you feel me. I'm not a hater or a critic on him, you know, I do me. God bless him, God bless me."

== Discography ==
=== Studio albums ===
- II (2025)

=== Mixtapes ===
- New English (2016)

=== EPs ===
- L.O.D. (2018)
- Diamonds Forever (2020)
- 3 the Hard Way (2021)
- Rebirth (2024)
- Be Me (2025)

== Awards and nominations ==
Year	Award	Category	Nominee	Result	Ref.
2016	Teen Choice Awards	Choice Music: R&B/Hip-Hop Song	"Panda"	Nominated	
2016	MTV Video Music Awards	Best New Artist	Himself	Nominated	
2016	MTV Video Music Awards	Best Hip Hop Video	"Panda"	Nominated	
2016	BET Hip Hop Awards	Best Hip Hop Video	"Panda"	Nominated	
2016	BET Hip Hop Awards	People's Champ Award	"Panda"	Nominated	
2016	BET Hip Hop Awards	Best New Hip Hop Artist	Himself	Nominated	
2016	MTV Video Music Awards Japan	Best Hip Hop Video	"Panda"	Nominated	
2016	American Music Awards	Video of the Year	"Panda"	Nominated	
2016	American Music Awards	Favorite Rap/Hip Hop Song	"Panda"	Nominated	
2016	WatsUp TV Africa Music Video Awards	WatsUp TV Viewers Choice Award	"Panda"	Won	
2017	Grammy Awards	Best Rap Performance	"Panda"	Nominated	
2017	iHeartRadio Music Awards	Hip-Hop Song of the Year	"Panda"	Nominated	
2017	iHeartRadio Music Awards	Hip-Hop Artist of the Year	Himself	Nominated	
2017	iHeartRadio Music Awards	Best New Hip-Hop Artist	Himself	Nominated	
2017	Billboard Music Awards	Top New Artist	Himself	Nominated	
2017	Billboard Music Awards	Top Streaming Songs Artist	Himself	Nominated	
2017	Billboard Music Awards	Top Rap Artist	Himself	Nominated	
2017	Billboard Music Awards	Top Streaming Song (Video)	"Panda"	Won	
2017	Billboard Music Awards	Top Rap Song	"Panda"	Won	
