= Panda (song) =

Single by Desiigner

from the album New English
- Released: December 15, 2015
- Recorded: 2015
- Genre: Hip hop; trap
- Length: 4:10 (album version); 3:46 (radio edit)
- Label: GOOD; Def Jam
- Songwriters: Sidney Selby III; Adnan Khan
- Producer: Menace

Desiigner singles chronology
"Panda" (2015)	"Champions" (2016)

Music video
- "Panda" on YouTube

"Panda" is the debut single by American rapper Desiigner. The song premiered in December 2015 and was released for digital download on the iTunes Store as a single, before being re-released on February 26, 2016. The song was written by Desiigner and the track's producer was Menace. "Panda" was heavily sampled by GOOD Music labelmate and founder Kanye West for "Pt. 2", a song on West's seventh studio album The Life of Pablo, and inspired a number of remixes. The single received a nomination for Best Rap Performance at the 59th Annual Grammy Awards. A music video was released on May 10, 2016. It was nominated for Best Hip Hop Video at the 2016 MTV Video Music Awards. It was Billboard magazine's number-one rap song of 2016, taking the top spot on the Billboard Year-End Hot Rap Songs of 2016 chart.

== Composition ==
"Panda" is a hip hop and trap song. The hook was written about a white BMW X6, a luxury SUV which he likens to the appearance of a panda bear. The black X6 is compared to a phantom. "I'm just putting it in a greater way of how I say and the way I live." Desiigner discovered the song's beat on YouTube, which was produced by up-and-coming Rochdale-based producer Menace. Menace has stated the track takes influence from the UK grime scene.

== Critical reception ==
Rolling Stone named "Panda" one of the 30 best songs of the first half of 2016, writing "The Future-esque rapping and menacing trap beat that underlies 'Panda''s ridiculous repetition were already making Internet waves, but a prominent sample on Kanye West's The Life of Pablo made Desiigner a fixture everywhere from car stereos to Vogue shoots." Billboard ranked "Panda" at number 24 on their "100 Best Pop Songs of 2016" list: "Visions of a black-and-white BMW X6 sparked Desiigner's breakout joyride anthem 'Panda'. The Brooklyn upstart's spazzy, high-octane bars may have required a Genius.com lyric video to decipher, but the energy was so contagious that Kanye West had to tap the melodic G.O.O.D. Music MC's smash for his own zeitgeist-capturing album." Pitchfork listed "Panda" on their ranking of the 100 best songs of 2016 at number 56.

== Commercial performance ==
"Panda" debuted at number 96 on the US Billboard Hot 100 for the chart issue dated March 12, 2016, and reached the top five in its seventh week. On its ninth week, "Panda" reached number one on the Hot 100 for the chart dated May 7, 2016, ending the nine-week reign of "Work" by Rihanna featuring Drake. The feat ended a record-setting 41-week streak of non-Americans topping the chart. It stayed at number one for two weeks, until it was replaced by "One Dance" by Drake featuring Wizkid and Kyla on the chart issue dated May 21, 2016. Desiigner was the first rapper to crown the Hot 100 with a debut chart entry since Iggy Azalea arrived with "Fancy" (featuring Charli XCX), which ruled for seven weeks beginning June 7, 2014.

At 18 years and 11 months old, Desiigner was the youngest artist to top the Hot 100 since Lorde, who was 16 years and 11 months old when "Royals" assumed the top spot (for nine weeks) on October 12, 2013. The song spent seventeen weeks in the top ten of the Hot 100 before dropping out. It also reached number one on Hot R&B/Hip-Hop Songs. Among the Hot 100's component charts, "Panda" peaked at number 2 on Digital Songs and 10 on Radio Songs, and topped Streaming Songs. As of December 2016, it has sold 1,524,000 copies in the United States. The song had the most on demand streams (audio and video combined) in the US in 2016 (791,000).

== Remixes, samples and media usage ==
"Panda" has been unofficially remixed several times by various rappers, including T-Pain, Lil Mama, Uncle Murda, Montana of 300, Dave East, Lupe Fiasco, Futuristic, Meek Mill, Lil' Kim, Cupcakke, Maino, Kash Doll, Fabolous, Joyner Lucas and Fat Trel among others.

A Spanish version was released by Cuban Latin trap artist Almighty on the Miami-based label Carbon Fiber Music. Borrowing the original version's beat, it features Farruko, owner of said label, while a subsequent remix adds Daddy Yankee and Cosculluela. Additionally, fellow Latin trap artist Anuel AA released a diss track towards Almighty, entitled "RIP Panda" and using the same beat, after being taken down from the remix.

Kanye West sampled the song for his song "Pt. 2" which appeared on his seventh studio album, The Life of Pablo (2016). In an interview with Big Boy on June 3, 2016, Kanye West announced an official "15 minute" Panda remix, featuring verses from all GOOD Music artists. However, as of 2026, the remix has not seen any release.

"Panda" was used by NBA player Shaquille O'Neal as his WrestleMania 32 entrance music.

The song is also heard in the television shows Empire, Rosewood, Black-ish, Son of Zorn, Skam, and The Last Man on Earth.

The song is also heard in the films The Secret Life of Pets 2 (in which Kevin Hart briefly covers the track) and Baywatch.

Beyoncé used the song as part of a dance break during her song "Diva" in The Formation World Tour.

== Music video ==
The song's official music video was released on May 10, 2016, through the subscription-based digital music streaming platform Tidal. The YouTube video came out on May 17 and has over half of a billion views as of 2023. The night time music video features an urban theme and close-ups of Desiigner himself, with a cameo appearance by Kanye West. Desiigner carjacks a stopped black BMW X6 and cruises the streets; he then rides shotgun as he raps with Ye driving. At the end, he watches a white X6 doing donuts.

== Charts ==
=== Weekly charts ===
Chart (2015–2016)	Peak position
Australia (ARIA)	7
Austria (Ö3 Austria Top 40)	19
Belgium (Ultratop 50 Flanders)	13
Belgium (Ultratop 50 Wallonia)	31
Canada Hot 100 (Billboard)	4
Denmark (Tracklisten)	10
Finland (Suomen virallinen lista)	10
France (SNEP)	16
Germany (GfK)	13
Hungary (Dance Top 40)	23
Hungary (Single Top 40)	6
Hungary (Stream Top 40)	11
Ireland (IRMA)	16
Italy (FIMI)	25
Lebanon (Lebanese Top 20)	16
Netherlands (Dutch Top 40)	15
Netherlands (Single Top 100)	8
New Zealand (Recorded Music NZ)	4
Norway (VG-lista)	14
Portugal (AFP)	9
Scottish Singles Sales (Official Charts)	24
South Africa Airplay (EMA)	9
Spain (Promusicae)	53
Sweden (Sverigetopplistan)	12
Switzerland (Schweizer Hitparade)	12
UK Hip Hop/R&B (Official Charts)	2
UK Singles (Official Charts)	7
US Billboard Hot 100	1
US Hot R&B/Hip-Hop Songs (Billboard)	1
US Pop Airplay (Billboard)	21
US Rhythmic Airplay (Billboard)	2

=== Year-end charts ===
Chart (2016)	Position
Australia (ARIA)	38
Austria (Ö3 Austria Top 40)	43
Belgium (Ultratop Flanders)	42
Belgium (Ultratop Wallonia)	84
Canada (Canadian Hot 100)	16
Denmark (Tracklisten)	47
France (SNEP)	15
Germany (Official German Charts)	32
Hungary (Dance Top 40)	92
Hungary (Single Top 40)	69
Italy (FIMI)	59
Netherlands (Dutch Top 40)	67
Netherlands (Single Top 100)	35
New Zealand (Recorded Music NZ)	25
Sweden (Sverigetopplistan)	34
Switzerland (Schweizer Hitparade)	26
UK Singles (OCC)	36
US Billboard Hot 100	6
US Hot R&B/Hip-Hop Songs (Billboard)	2
US Hot Rap Songs (Billboard)	1
US Rhythmic (Billboard)	8

Chart (2017)	Position
Hungary (Dance Top 40)	86

=== Decade-end charts ===
Chart (2010–2019)	Position
US Billboard Hot 100	96
US Hot R&B/Hip-Hop Songs (Billboard)	39

== Certifications ==
Region	Certification	Certified units/sales
Australia (ARIA)	5× Platinum	350,000^{‡}
Belgium (BRMA)	Platinum	20,000^{‡}
Brazil (Pro-Música Brasil)	Diamond	250,000^{‡}
Canada (Music Canada)	4× Platinum	320,000^{‡}
Denmark (IFPI Danmark)	2× Platinum	180,000^{‡}
France (SNEP)	Diamond	233,333^{‡}
Germany (BVMI)	Platinum	400,000^{‡}
Italy (FIMI)	2× Platinum	100,000^{‡}
New Zealand (RMNZ)	4× Platinum	120,000^{‡}
Poland (ZPAV)	3× Platinum	150,000^{‡}
Portugal (AFP)	Platinum	10,000^{‡}
Spain (Promusicae)	Gold	20,000^{‡}
Sweden (GLF)	3× Platinum	120,000^{‡}
United Kingdom (BPI)	2× Platinum	1,200,000^{‡}
United States (RIAA)	5× Platinum	5,000,000^{‡}
^{‡} Sales+streaming figures based on certification alone.

== See also ==
- List of Billboard Hot 100 number-one singles of 2016
- List of Billboard Hot 100 top 10 singles in 2016
