= L.O.D. (EP) =

EP by Desiigner
- Released: May 4, 2018
- Recorded: 2017–2018
- Genres: Hip-hop; trap
- Length: 18:48
- Labels: GOOD; Def Jam
- Producers: Desiigner (exec.); Mike Dean (also co-exec.); 16yrold; Andre Atkinson; DJ Relly Rell; JSDG; Kidkeva; Redda; Ronny J; Sean Garrett; Willie P

Desiigner chronology
New English (2016)	L.O.D. (2018)	Diamonds Forever (2020)

Professional ratings
Review scores
Source	Rating
Exclaim!	4/10
Pitchfork	4.6/10

L.O.D. (an acronym for Life of Desiigner) is the first extended play (EP) by American rapper Desiigner. It was released on May 4, 2018, through GOOD Music and Def Jam. The EP features production from Mike Dean, Ronny J, and Sean Garrett, among others. It serves as Desiigner's first full-length project since the release of his debut mixtape New English (2016). It is the last project released by Desiigner through GOOD Music.

== Background ==
Desiigner first announced the project as one of two albums he had produced on his Twitter in November 2017. There was no further discussion on the two albums until May 3, 2018, when he announced that the album, titled L.O.D. would be released as an EP (extended play) at midnight. Desiigner's representative confirmed to Pitchfork that L.O.D. is an EP despite it being called an album on the artwork.

== Track listing ==
Credits adapted from Tidal.

No.	Title	Writer(s)	Producer(s)	Length
1.	"Priice Tag"	Sidney Selby; Ronald Spence Jr.	Ronny J	1:50
2.	"Tonka"	Selby; Terrell Roberts; Jerry Cruz; Mike Dean	DJ Relly Rell; 16yrold; Dean^{[b]}	2:58
3.	"After Party"	Selby; Jahceim White	JSDG	2:52
4.	"Pop iiT"	Selby; Bryan Trillos; Dean	Redda; Dean^{[b]}	2:54
5.	"Destiination"	Selby; Dean; Sean Garrett; Andre Atkinson	Garrett; Atkinson; Dean^{[a]}	3:25
6.	"LA to NY"	Selby; Kevin Gill	Kidkeva	3:07
7.	"Hood"	Selby; Jahceim White; Willie Peebles; Dean	JSDG; Willie P; Dean^{[a]}	3:02
Total length:				18:48

Notes

- ^{^[a]} signifies a co-producer
- ^{^[b]} signifies an additional producer

== Personnel ==
Credits adapted from Tidal.

Musicians

- Mike Dean – additional keyboards (tracks 2, 4, 5, 7), rhodes, synth bass (track 5)
- Yasmeen Al-Mazeedi – violin (tracks 5, 7)
- Johan – string arranger (tracks 5, 7)

Technical

- Tom Kahre – recording (tracks 1, 3, 5), mixing assistance (all tracks)
- Jenna Felsenthal – recording assistance (track 1)
- Jason Pezzotti – recording (track 2)
- Marlon Adams – recording (track 2)
- Devonne Knights – recording (track 4)
- Carlos Vives – recording (track 6)
- Corey Nutile – recording (track 7)
- Gaylord Kalani – recording assistance (tracks 3, 5)
- Fahad Rahman – recording assistance (track 6)
- Ryan Potts – recording assistance (track 7)
- Mike Dean – mixing (tracks 1–7)
- Sean Solymar – mixing assistance (tracks 1–7)

== Charts ==
Chart (2018)	Peak position
US Billboard 200	161
