= The Yeezus Tour =

2013–2014 concert tour by Kanye West

- World tour by Kanye West
- Location: United States; Canada; Australia
- Associated album: Yeezus
- Start date: October 19, 2013 (United States)
- End date: September 15, 2014 (Australia)
- Legs: 3
- No. of shows: 45
- Supporting acts: Kendrick Lamar; Pusha T; Travis Scott; A Tribe Called Quest
- Box office: $31.8 million (Note: Amount grossed over the first 33 dates)

Kanye West concert chronology
- Watch the Throne Tour (2011–12); The Yeezus Tour (2013–14); Saint Pablo Tour (2016)

The Yeezus Tour was the fifth concert tour by American rapper Kanye West, in support of his sixth studio album, Yeezus (2013). Announced with a promotional poster in September 2013, it served as West's first solo concert tour since the Glow in the Dark Tour (2007–08). West shared the opening North American dates that same month and in January 2014, he revealed an additional stint across the continent. The rapper announced legs across Europe and Australia for 2014, although the European dates were cancelled. The tour was intended to combine staging, production, and West's aesthetic to showcase his creativity. Its stage design was handled by Es Devlin, the firm Family, Virgil Abloh, and John McGuire, with Devlin having worked on the likes of mountains and icebergs with West. For the imagery, such as the mountain, West was largely inspired by Alejandro Jodorowsky's cult film, The Holy Mountain (1973). West was accompanied by an opening act from Kendrick Lamar on most dates and Pusha T for some of them, while A Tribe Called Quest opened two shows and Travis Scott accompanied Pusha T on one show.

The tour began in Seattle on October 19, 2013, travelling across the United States, as well as to Canada and Australia, until the last show in Brisbane on September 15, 2014. Due to West's equipment becoming damaged after an accident with his tour truck in late October 2013, numerous tour dates in the US were cancelled and others re-scheduled to later dates. West performed the tracks from Yeezus alongside work from his earlier albums and accompanied some tracks with narratives, including delivering stream-of-conscious speeches after "Runaway". The concerts were separated into the five themes of "Fighting", "Rising", "Falling", "Searching", and "Finding", which were introduced with elements from the Bible. West followed different stages of his life in the themes, using masks to represent the personality shifts. The tour made use of a light show that included a light beam, laser beams, and an LED screen.

The Yeezus Tour received widespread acclaim from critics, who lauded its imagery and generally focused on the mountain. Some critics commended the lighting, while a few reviewers highlighted West's collection of masks. The tour scored the second-highest grossing leg of a tour in 2013, only behind Paul McCartney's Out There! Tour. It was the highest-grossing hip-hop tour of 2013, at $31.8 million from 33 shows. The tour was included as the year's most seminal concert in Corbin Reiff's 2017 book, Lighters in the Sky: The All-Time Greatest Concerts, 1960-2016. An accompanying Hype Williams–directed film was teased by West in February 2014, although it was cancelled despite negotiations with IMAX due to his personal issues after Kim Kardashian was robbed in 2016.

== Background ==
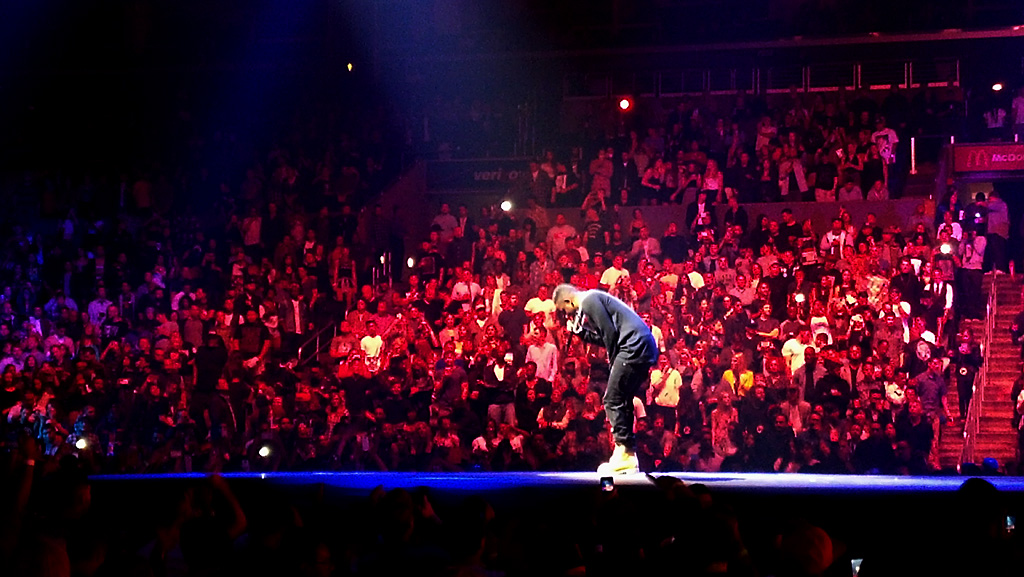
For most of the first leg, Kendrick Lamar served as the tour's opening act.

In June 2013, West's sixth studio album Yeezus was released to commercial success, reaching number one in 31 countries. Co-producer Mike Dean subsequently confirmed that a tour would be held for the album with him as a backing performer. On September 6, 2013, West announced the Yeezus Tour with a promotional poster showing the album's title and him dangling backwards using his arms. West shared 23 dates and the accompaniment of an opening act from fellow rapper Kendrick Lamar, who was scheduled for all but five dates that had a "special guest" set instead. This marked Lamar's first live appearance with a full backing band, although his label Top Dawg Entertainment wanted him to focus on recording rather than joining the tour. West's team insisted on his inclusion however, which the label allowed once a studio bus was secured for Lamar to record while touring. In spite of expectations from journalists that the rappers would have engaged in communal bonding, they spent little time around each other. Lamar mentioned that West desired for him not to seem like "just the opener", impressed with the rapper wanting his opening show to be on the same level as the headlining set. Tickets went on sale the week after West's announcement and tour dates ran from October 19–December 7, 2013, venturing across the United States and also visiting Canada. Later in September, West announced an additional six dates across North America.

The Yeezus Tour stood as West's first solo tour since the Glow in the Dark Tour from 2007–2008; he did not tour for his fifth album My Beautiful Dark Twisted Fantasy due to a lack of sponsorship in 2010. West had previously performed tracks from Yeezus live for television shows, including "Black Skinhead" on Saturday Night Live and "Blood on the Leaves" at the 2013 MTV Video Music Awards. Music programmer Alluxe handled music programming and live vocal effects for the Yeezus Tour, referring to her work as "controllerism" since she felt this represented the complete process of utilizing hardware controllers to control software. West previously worked with her on West and fellow rapper Jay-Z's track "Made in America" (2011), and their Watch the Throne Tour (2011–2012). The programmer generally strayed from talking about working with acts like these rappers, wanting people to support her music because they enjoyed it rather than because of her connections.

For the tour's show at Las Vegas' Grand Garden Arena on October 25, 2013, rapper Pusha T served as the opening act. A Tribe Called Quest opened the concerts in New York at the Barclays Center and Madison Square Garden on November 20 and 24, respectively, marking their first shows since performing in California during August. The group insisted on doing these final two concerts in their home city, although they later performed together again for a 2017 tour that ended at the English festival Bestival. On October 30, 2013, West's tour truck was involved in an accident on the way to a concert in Vancouver. The vehicle carried custom-made video screens and equipment, which was damaged beyond repair and this caused the show's cancelation since it was central to the staging. West also canceled tour dates in Denver, Columbus, Montreal, Minneapolis, and St. Louis, with Def Jam citing "routing logistics". Shows in Chicago, Toronto, and Detroit were rescheduled to later dates; the tour leg was set to run until December 23, 2013. The tour resumed at the Wells Fargo Center in Philadelphia on November 6, 2013.

On January 7, 2014, West revealed nine dates for the Yeezus Tour across the US East Coast and Canada from February 13–23. Live Nation Entertainment held a credit card-sponsored presale the following day and tickets went on sale on January 10, while a press release said the leg would be the last chance for North Americans to see the rapper's "creative concept". On February 17, 2014, Live Nation announced tour dates across Australia from May 2–10. The leg featured Pusha T as an opening act and marked West's first appearance in the country since the 2012 Big Day Out festival. On March 25, 2014, West announced a European tour leg that included the likes of Germany, Norway, and the United Kingdom from June 21–July 6. A German promoter reported three days later that the European dates had been cancelled, citing "production problems". On April 1, 2014, Live Nation issued a statement that West postponed the Australian leg until September. The statement cited "unexpected timing requirements" for working on his seventh album that had been set for release in 2014.

== Stage and design ==
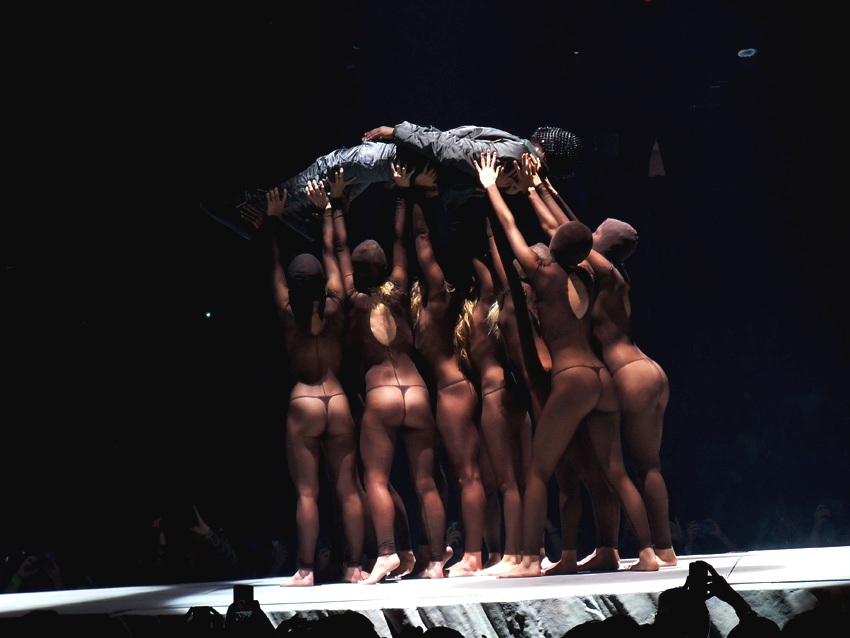
Parts of the tour were inspired by the 1973 cult film The Holy Mountain, including half-naked women carrying West out of his concerts (pictured above).

A press release for E! Online said that the Yeezus Tour would combine "state-of-the-art staging, production, and lighting design with [West's] unmatched aesthetic", creative mind, and decade-long discography of singles. Set to represent the "end of the world", the tour featured a triangular main stage that resembles a catwalk. At a show in New York on November 20, 2013, West revealed that filmmaker Alejandro Jodorowsky's 1973 cult film The Holy Mountain was an inspiration for the Yeezus Tour. Imagery was influenced by the film's mountain that is shown when the thief leaves from a cross after getting attacked with stones by boys, before a spiritual guide attempts to lead him to the Holy Mountain. The tour's 50–foot mountain appears on stage prior to West performing on the top, while explosions from fire and lava occur when the mountain breaks open; it was sometimes referred to as "Mount Yeezy". Various groups of women form circle arrangements in The Holy Mountain; women appear nude or cloaked as they surround West in mostly circular movements during the tour. Faces are covered, uncovered, and attacked by insects in the film, which West references with the various masks of himself and his dancers. The thief is carried in multiple film scenes and West is carried out by a touring crew of semi-naked women, while the character and one on the Yeezus Tour both resemble Jesus. West and Jodorowsky met each other in June 2014; he was taken aback by the rapper's pureness and deep desire to craft "a work that develops the consciousness of young people".

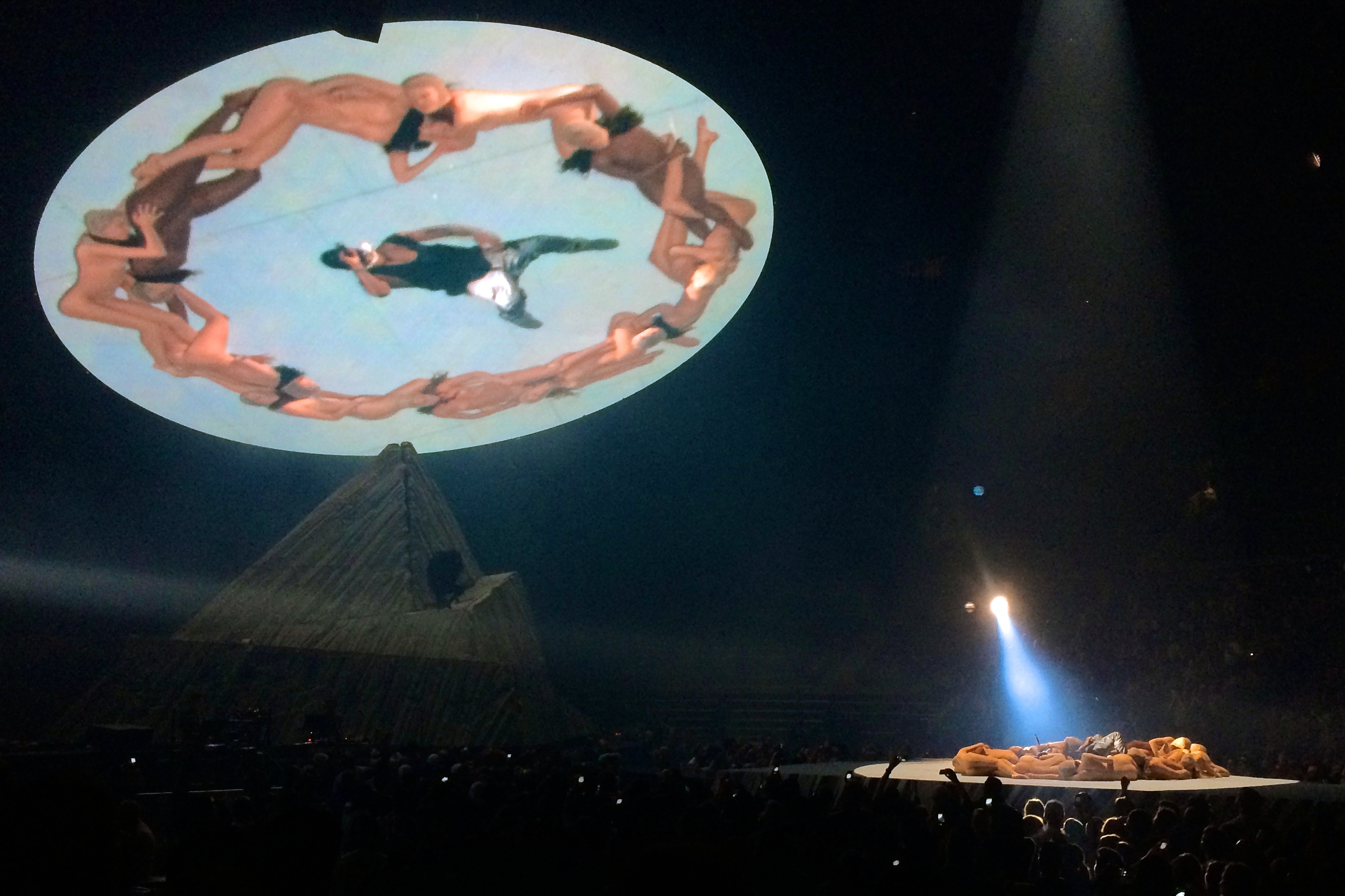
West lied down on the triangular main stage as he was encircled by an arrangement of naked women, backed by the 60–foot LED screen that was constructed for the Yeezus Tour.

The tour's stage design was handled by British designer Es Devlin, who had previously worked on the Watch the Throne Tour and West's Touch the Sky Tour (2005–06). Devlin stated that West was continuously evolving creatively and the two had talked about mountains since 2005, discussing them alongside icebergs during the Watch the Throne Tour. The rapper's concert with Jay-Z in Atlantic City was supposed to feature mountains and icebergs in 2012, which West and Devlin used as a starting point for the tour's planning. Devlin noted West's dependence on reflected light like an opera and compared pointing a light at the crowd during the concerts to pressing "the energy button". New York firm Family, Donda's since-deceased creative director Virgil Abloh, stage designer John McGuire, and architect Oana Stanescu also contributed to the design. Abloh posted behind-the-scenes photos of the Yeezus Tour and McGuire had unsuccessfully attempted to persuade West not to use a 60–foot circular LED screen, recalling the screen having to be built. Scenography and choreography were done by Italian designer Vanessa Beecroft, who worked with West on material such as a listening party for his 2008 album 808s & Heartbreak, his 2010 short film Runaway and the music video of "Only One" in 2015.

In October 2013, it was reported by The Daily Telegraph that the French fashion house Maison Margiela provided West with his clothing for the tour which consisted of 10 specified pieces, 20 ready-to-wear pieces, and a pair of trainers. They designed four face masks that were based in black silk gauze; a spokesperson explained the transparent material needed to be in black for models to see through "because white becomes opaque". The fashion house issued a statement that they were unfazed by West's public image in October 2013, focusing on working together from appreciation of his support and music. Maison Margiela was not briefed for the Yeezus Tour and only told to design in line with Beecroft's artistic direction, working closely with West since the start of the year and beginning from reinterpretations of their archives. They went through a few fittings for the garments, fabrics, textures, colours, and details, having no limits to production in their Parisian workshop. One of West's masks reinterprets Maison Margiela's signature mask from their shows; they said it was obvious for him this after he performed "in a crystal veil" for their couture collection in the fall of 2012.

== Concert synopsis ==
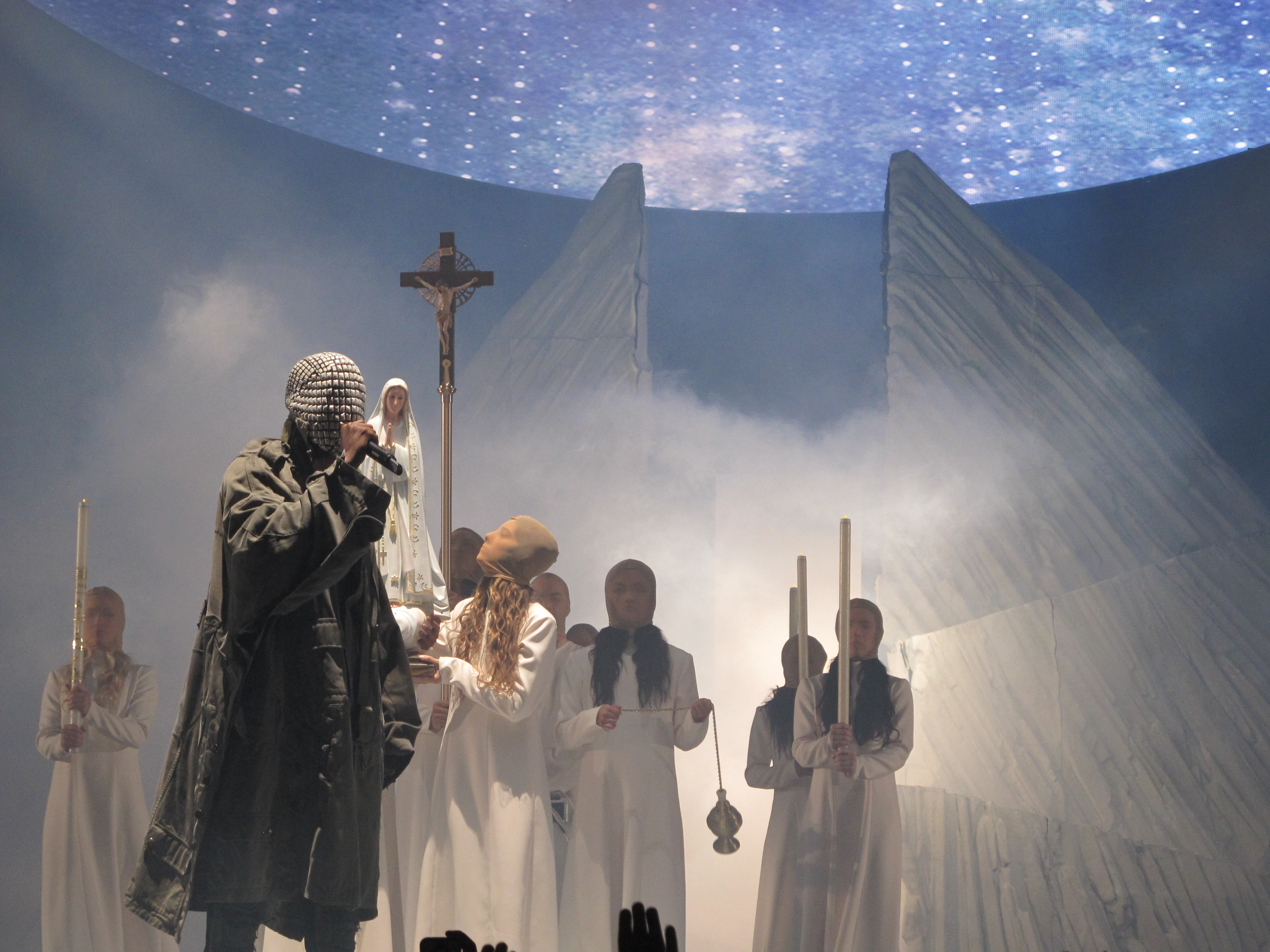
West was accompanied at the front of the tour's stage by his robe dancers, who held imagery from the Bible as a 50–foot mountain was present in the background.

The Yeezus Tour was split into five different themes; "Fighting", "Rising", "Falling", "Searching", and "Finding". The narrative combines the Bible's story of King David with Dante Alighieri's 14th-century poem Inferno, including the poem's quote "Virgil shows up to lead him to salvation"; this character has the same forename as Abloh. Each theme's name was projected in white block letters on the LED screen in front of the mountain peak, being introduced over the arena speakers as passages and symbolism from the Bible were utilized. The screen moved between images and videos from the stage, as well as images of fire and was backed by thick fog. West went against his glass ceiling as he opened with Fighting, ordering Def Jam to give him $50 million as he performed "New Slaves" and "Mercy". Rising was based on the rapper's rise to fame, power, greatness, and destiny, relishing in his triumph. West alluded to Malcolm X and M.O.P. during "Power" and "Cold", while he shouted atop a rising mountain peak for "I Am a God". The dark moment in Kanye's life of his mother Donda West's death was marked by Falling, where a regretful snowfall fell down during "Coldest Winter". Kanye West also fought inner demons that he faced as a result of his behaviour, using his celebrity status to hide the fight. During "Hold My Liquor" and "Heartless", he was stalked by a red-eyed Yeti demon that crouched from another side of the mountain. A hell–like setting appeared for "Blood on the Leaves", depicted by bursts of fire and throbbing red projections. West engaged in self-reflection as he re-evaluated his place in the world for Searching, introduced by the narrator's promise that "If you seek him, you shall find".

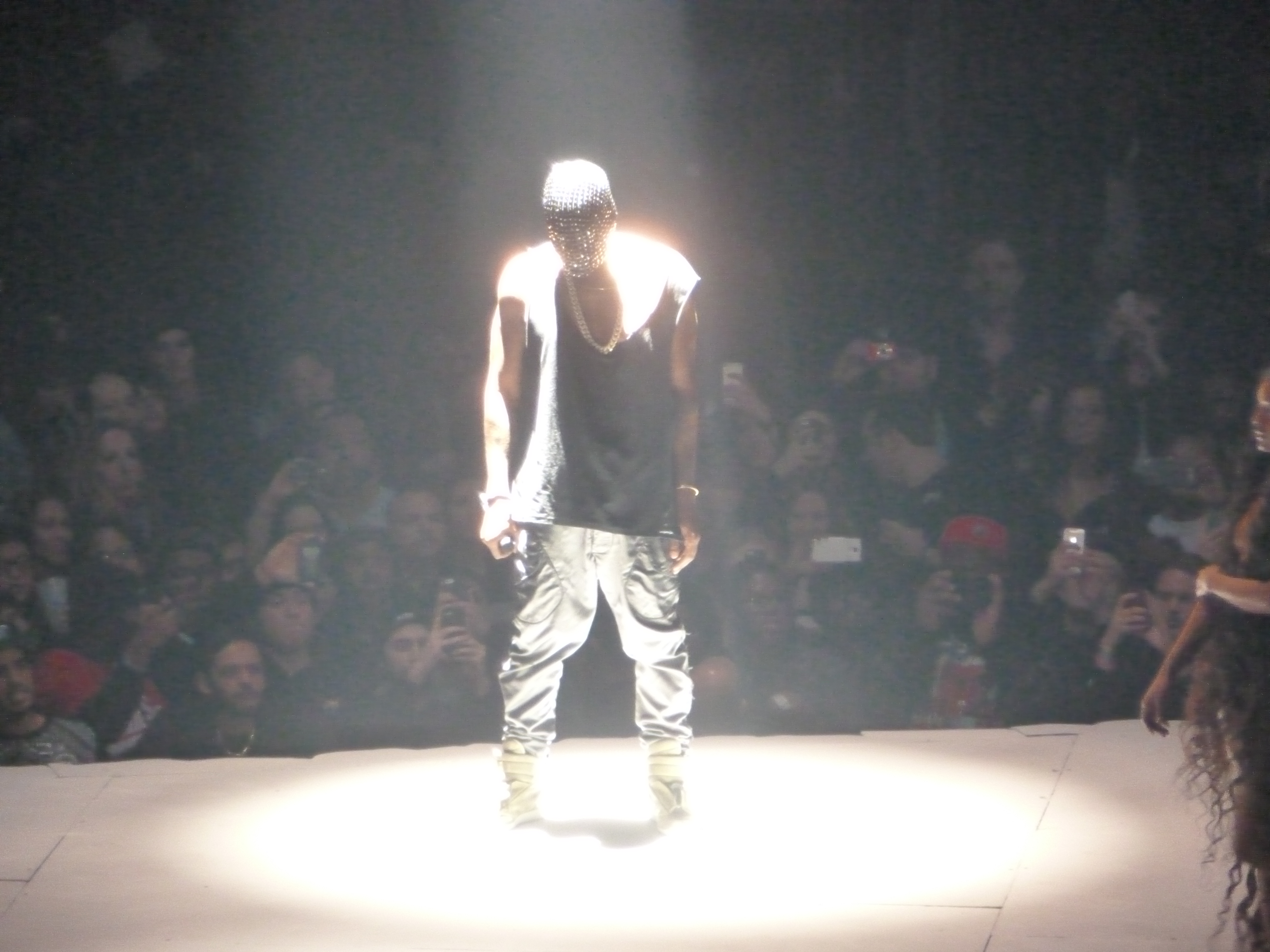
West wore a mirror mask during Searching that reflected surrounding brightness, while a singular light beam shined down at him.

West used four different face masks for the concert themes, which represented various aspects of his life. The rapper utilized a bejeweled luchador brown mask with a graffiti style for Fighting, featuring a patchwork of beading, decorative borders, and polished metals. He followed with a black mask during Rising, featuring shining studs of this color. West also rocked a black mask for Falling, covered by square white tiles. The mountain erupted with videos showing lava during the segment, as well as pyrotechnics that included sparks and red flares. The mountain cooled down before the beginning of Searching, which saw it break open for a procession of models acting as disciples carrying Frankincense and the character of Virgin Mary. West had a mirror mask for the segment, reflecting any brightness in front of him similarly to a disco ball. He delivered stream-of-conscious speeches through Auto-Tune after performing "Runaway", which were characterized as rants. West often referenced the power of corporations in the speeches, speaking against the likes of the Grammy Awards, MTV, Nike, and label executives. He self-proclaimed himself as a genius and made comparisons to figures such as inventor Nikola Tesla and Jodorowsky, as well as criticizing his media coverage and encouraging the audience to achieve their dreams. A character named White Jesus portraying Jesus appeared and removed West's mirror mask while he was kneeling during Finding, revealing the rapper's face for the first time and symbolizing him as Yeezus meeting Jesus. The character gave his blessings to West, who then performed "Jesus Walks" and declared after "All of the Lights" that "Don't nobody look stupider than me". For the closing number "Bound 2", West and a dozen robe dancers fell to their knees next to White Jesus atop the mountain as the character delivered a sermon. West and the dancers were covered in light in the ending as they looked up at White Jesus, who told the rapper that he was searching for him so he can show people "the light".

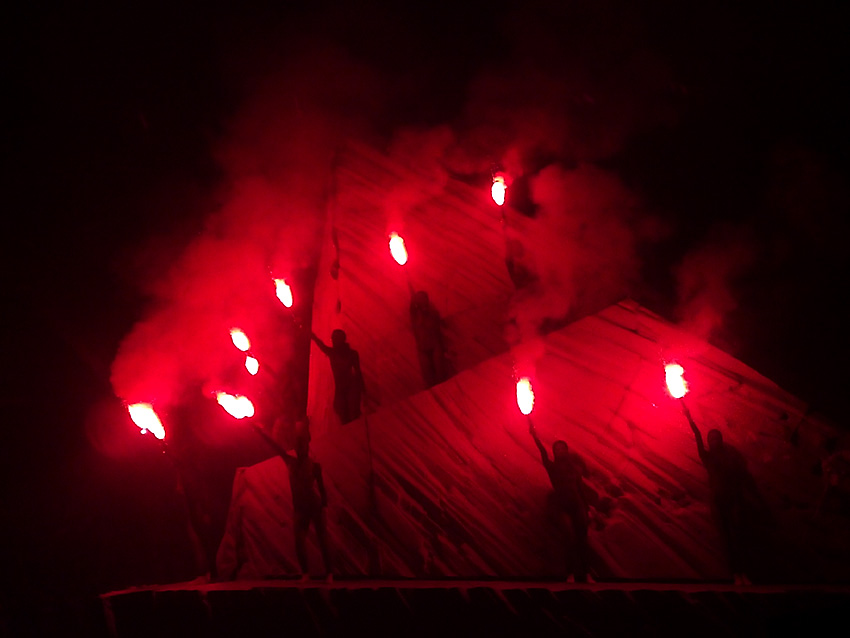
West's dancers appeared on the mountain for the ending, where they held glowsticks.

A light show was deployed for the Yeezus Tour, with West remaining in the spotlight. For the beginning, the arena lights dimmed out just before West emerged. Before the rapper appeared at certain concerts, a snippet was played of an unreleased track reportedly titled "I Am Not Here" that cut off abruptly. Rays of flashing white lights then appeared, which covered the stage throughout his performances. At points, West is illuminated by a singular light beam. Colored laser beams from the mountain shot across the venues and onto the triangular stage, depicting a pyramid. Flashes of different solos were contributed from Dean, including guitar, bass, and synths. West's dancers walked down the catwalk in single file at the beginning, appearing in white robes and nude bodysuits with matching stockings on the dancers' faces that left their hair exposed. He made a writhing throne around the dancers, who later surrounded him in a circle on the floor. Representing this scene, footage was shown on the screen of a Satanic orgy combined with a sequence from Busby Berkeley. The dancers also posed and showed appreciation for West, carrying him out in a procession and holding glowsticks atop the mountain at the ending. The mountain changed its setting during the concerts, going from being an iceberg to later splitting in half when transforming from a mountain to a volcano. For the iceberg display, it featured a zig-zagging downward path and was connected to the main stage by a crinkled walkway.

=== Special guests ===
During Lamar's opening acts, the LED screen showed footage illustrating the themes of his sophomore album Good Kid, M.A.A.D City (2012), combining slow motion shots of the city of Compton with Blood-walks. The shots included arms leaning out of Cadillac windows in the city's sun and smoke of blunts blowing out from the front of porches, which were covered with dandelions. Lamar was backed by a four-piece band that altered his beats, contributing licks and bass. He brought out fellow rapper E-40 for him to perform "Function" at a tour stop in San Jose on October 22, 2013, coinciding with the one year anniversary of Good Kid, M.A.A.D City.

For the concerts opened by A Tribe Called Quest, the group were backed by a body-painted lady representing "Bonita Applebum" on the screen, who appeared in black, red, and green. The lady showcased her 38-24-37 frame and during "Sucka Nigga", projections were cast of children throwing around a sign reading "n-word". Q-Tip wore matching leather sweatpants, which became a staple of his as a GOOD Music signee. The member also rocked a camouflage military jacket, a black sleeveless T-shirt with the title of their 1993 album Midnight Marauders, and a pair of Air Jordan 1s. Other group members Phife Dawg and Jarobi White leapt into the air with choreographed steps during tracks like "Excursions" from their 1991 album The Low End Theory, while the two walked across the stage for "Bonita Applebum". DJ Ali Shaheed Muhammad played his version of "Scenario", during which Busta Rhymes appeared to rap his verse. A Tribe Called Quest closed with "Award Tour", followed by Q-Tip expressing his appreciation and love for the audience.

== Marketing ==
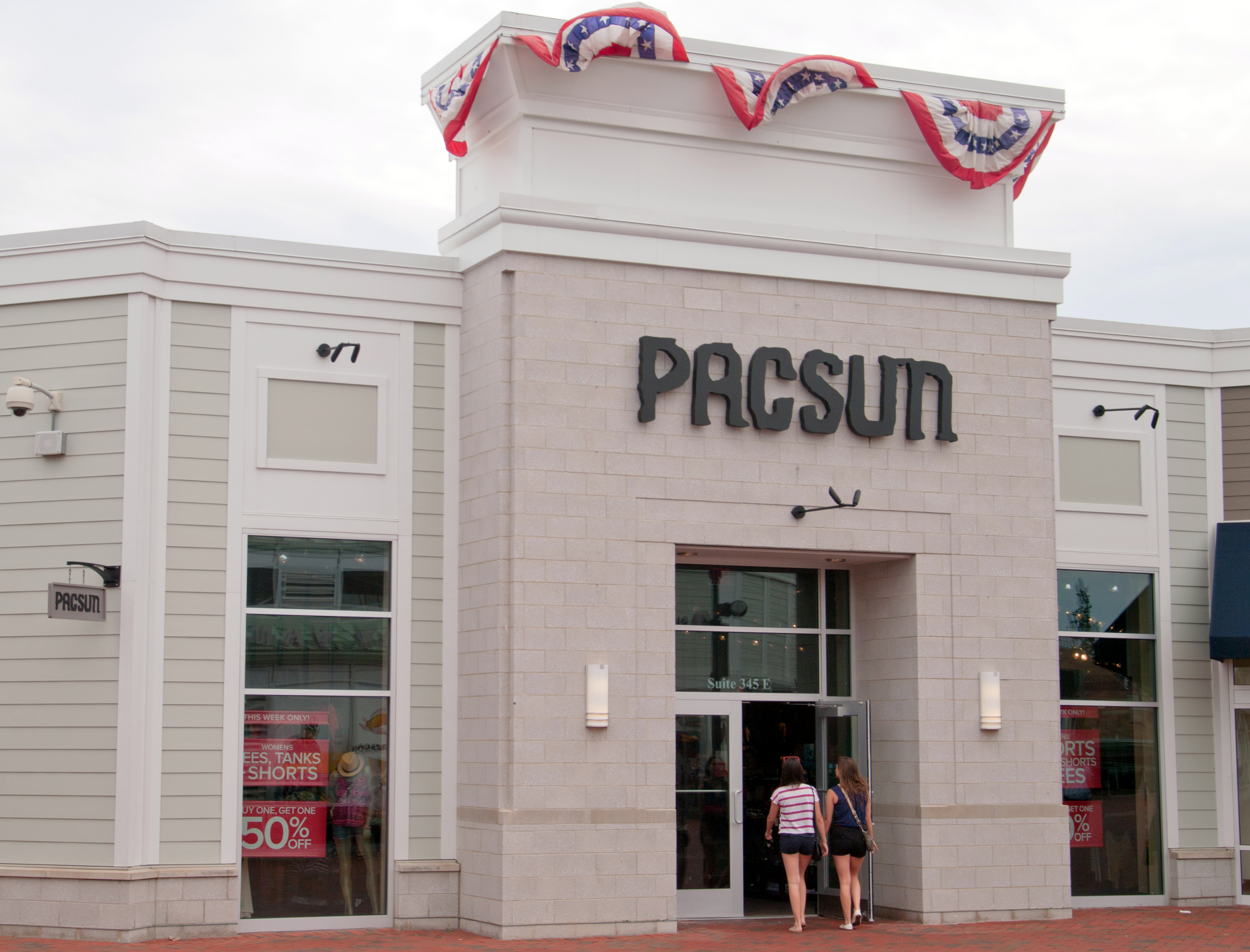
The tour's merchandise was first sold by PacSun after West secured a marketing deal with them and it was available in their stores from October 2013, one of which is pictured above.

After West failed to persuade The Gap, Inc. to sell the Yeezus Tour's merchandise at stores due to company politics, clothing brand PacSun announced they had secured a deal with him for sale both in stores and online on October 25, 2013. The merchandise invoked 1980s heavy metal bands and consisted of T-shirts, sweatshirts, tote bags, and trucker hats. In the same month of West's partnership, he made T-shirts available with the Confederate flag and opened a pop-up shop in Los Angeles for this merchandise. In spite of the flag's racist history, West explained that his usage was due to how it "represented slavery in a way" and considered any energy to be good. West also asserted that he made this symbol his flag, describing it as combining "super hood [with] super white boy approved" for his signature style. The merchandise also incorporated skeletons that wore Native American headdresses as they knelt to pray, dressed like the Grim Reaper using a scythe. It was later sold during West's appearances at festivals such as Made in America and Bonnaroo in the summer of 2014. On January 10, 2016, DJ Khaled shared new tees and hoodies for the Yeezus Tour that featured motifs of skulls, the Grim Reaper, and Playboy Bunny. Jerry Lorenzo, one of the tour's merchandise designers, revealed that he had unseen items from the production process in September 2017. His fishtail parka sold for $4,000, while items such as the tees were available for only $1.

In February 2014, West uploaded a trailer of a film for the Yeezus Tour to his website. It featured speedy shots of the tour, showing horses running in snow and West wearing his masks. Author Bret Easton Ellis revealed around the same time of the trailer that he was working with the rapper on a project, after having re-imagined a scene from American Psycho (2000) for a promotional clip of the tour. Ellis was reluctant to write for the film until he listened to an advance copy of Yeezus in the summer of 2013; he then crafted a script in "Kanye land". The film was set to be shot by director Hype Williams, who previously directed music videos for West's singles like "Gold Digger", "Stronger", and "Heartless".

In October 2023, Williams explained to Complex how after he shot the film with West in Chicago and Toronto, the two engaged in a dress rehearsal with attention to detail so intense that they lost its original meaning. West was working on The Life of Pablo at this time, therefore him and Williams instead decided to shoot videos for the album. The director and Scooter Braun spent six months negotiating with IMAX for the film's release, although it was discarded due to West's personal issues after his then-wife Kim Kardashian was robbed in Paris. Williams revealed that nobody, not even West himself, has viewed the film and it was filmed in 2014; he compared its significance to an unreleased recording from the likes of the Rolling Stones or the Beatles.

== Reception ==
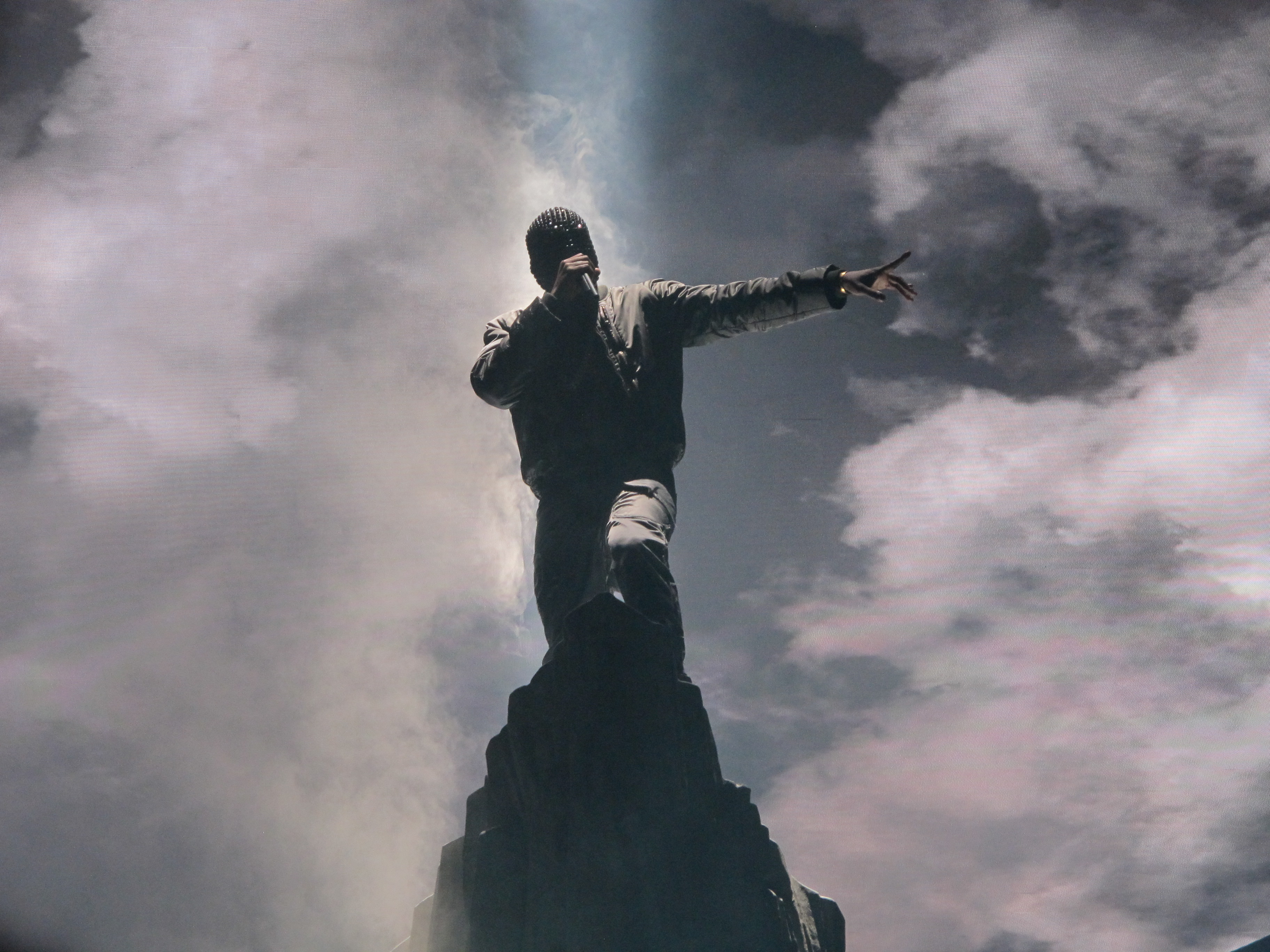
Reviewers often praised the tour's design and imagery, including the mountain and West's masks.

The Yeezus Tour was met with widespread acclaim from critics. Writing for Rolling Stone, Jonathan Ringen described the tour as "totally bonkers" for its combination of entertainment, ambitions, and West's emotion delving into "places that are dark and weird and sad". He highlighted the stage props like mountains and creatures, the musicality of West's performances, his dancers' processions, his theatrical masks, and the lighting. Ernest Baker of Vice said that the tour feels like West's "personal exaltation" and resembles a horror film to a heightened degree from the Staples Center concert's closeness to Halloween, holding this atmosphere through the night and contrasting with his "stadium status" from the Glow in the Dark Tour by focusing on himself. Baker described the Yeezus Tour as a funeral of West's frustrations in a haunted house through the backing guests of "goths [and] men in skirts", praising the stage design for its layering and the mountain. He noted that "blasphemy rules with a self-aware wink" in a way which is "creepy", rock, and punk. Baker compared West walking the path of his mountain to the angels in the video for Bone Thugs-n-Harmony's "Tha Crossroads", concluding by calling the tour "a larger than life moment" with cultural aspects and meaningful speeches from West. Forbes staff member Zack O'Malley Greenburg noted the tour as divine art from West's flourishes of fire and ice, as well as the mountain and his masks. Greenburg questioned if it is "the current mass cultural phenomenon" of art pop over Lady Gaga's 2013 album, offering that West takes "risks that few pop stars, if any, are willing to take in today's hyper-exposed" genre. He concluded that the tour is "overwrought and uncomfortable at times", yet was impressed with it going against "norms and provoking thought" in a manner straying from mainstream artists at the time. Jim Farber of the New York Daily News found that West's masks make him appear like a gladiator and he had a dramatic moment of moving his arms out to surrender to the arena's white light, highlighting the glacier-like structure and LED screen. Farber was thrilled with how the tour manages to either "startle or appall" and praised the appearance of the dancers, while he concluded that "unyielding beats, hellish textures and a brusque flow" were offered with an impact "as stunning as West's ego itself".

Complex's Foster Kamer was impressed with West's performances and the accompanying theatrics, noting that they serve the purpose of supplementing his "raw energy". Kamer glorified how only West would have the audacity to open a tour with "Mount Yeezy" and directed praise towards the lights, dancers, yeti, and the rapper's speeches. Colin McGuire from PopMatters was taken aback by the "ambitious and wildly theatrical" tour that proved West's superiority to his peers and was comparable to Abdellatif Kechiche's Blue Is the Warmest Colour (2013), while he praised West's "uncanny ability" at gaining or losing the respect of his listeners and his confidence. McGuire highlighted West's speeches after "Runaway" and how his inspiration is unique from other artists, seeing him as representative of "the parts of us that popular culture rarely allows us to reveal" with the provocative element of his focus on both religion and erotica. For The Hollywood Reporter, Jeff Weiss was compelled by the tour's themes and West's masks; he lauded the mountain, dancers, and Yeti demon, while observing the significance of the character White Jesus' appearance. Weiss saw it as "syncretistic extravaganza" and highlighted West's meticulous approach to his performances, noting that the proclamations in the rapper's speeches "strike a bizarre thunder in person" and concluding him outmatching Lamar's impressive opening set leaves the question, "What's a King to a God?"

The first leg of the Yeezus Tour stood behind singer Paul McCartney's Out There! Tour as the second highest grossing tour leg of 2013, gathering $25.2 million from 283,241 ticket sales. It was the highest-grossing hip-hop tour of the year, totaling $31.8 million from 33 shows.

In veteran critic Corbin Reiff's 2017 book Lighters in the Sky: The All-Time Greatest Concerts, 1960-2016, which ranks the most seminal concert of each year, lists the Yeezus Tour for 2013. Reiff told Business Insider at the time of publishing that the tour was one of the greatest live rap presentations ever and emphasized West's level of thought put into performing, believing anyone who knew nothing about him could watch it and "come away wowed at least". In January 2019, a list of the greatest tours of all time compiled by Vivid Seats and Consequence ranked the tour at number 68. Nina Corcoran felt that the ambitious stage design elevated West's personality and talent, focusing on the heavy usage of imagery and his speeches.

=== Wheelchair controversy ===
During the Yeezus Tour's concert at Qantas Credit Union Arena in Sydney on September 12, 2014, West insisted that he could not continue with the show and perform "Good Life" until all of the audience stood up. He offered that standing up would not be mandatory if "you got a handicap pass and you get [sic] special parking and shit", while expressing disbelief at how long he had been waiting to perform. West noticed the two wheelchair-using fans after they were brought to his attention by bodyguard Pascal Duvier and others seated nearby, accepting their exceptions and then performing "Good Life". He received negative attention across the media and Twitter over the incident, with commentators finding it inconsiderate to disabled people. A spokesperson for the organisation People with Disability Australia accused West of humiliation, citing how it could have been "a young person who's coming to terms with their disability". West delivered a five-minute rant about the incident at a tour stop in Brisbane on September 15, 2014, offering the likes of Matt Lauer, Michael Strahan, Whoopi Goldberg, and Robin Roberts to look at him from a new perspective rather than providing negative headlines. He also told the media that from his position as a married, Christian family man, they should have placed their focus on someone else instead of him.

== Set list ==
The Yeezus Tour was split into five different themes, which featured the below set lists performed by West. He also delivered "Drunk and Hot Girls", "I Wonder", "Street Lights", "Heard 'Em Say", and the instrumental of "Hey Mama" for the first concert in Seattle on October 19, 2013. At some concerts, a snippet was played of West's unreleased track "I Am Not Here".

Fighting

1. "On Sight"
2. "New Slaves"
3. "Send It Up"
4. "Mercy"

Rising

1. "Power"
2. "Cold"
3. "I Don't Like"
4. "Clique"
5. "Black Skinhead"
6. "I Am a God"
7. "Can't Tell Me Nothing"
8. "Coldest Winter"

Falling

1. "Hold My Liquor"
2. "I'm in It"
3. "Guilt Trip"
4. "Heartless"
5. "Blood on the Leaves"

Searching

1. "Lost in the World"
2. "Runaway"

Finding

1. "Stronger"
2. "Through the Wire"
3. "Jesus Walks"
4. "Diamonds from Sierra Leone"
5. "Flashing Lights"
6. "All of the Lights"
7. "Good Life"
8. "Bound 2"

== Tour dates ==
List of 2013 concerts (Note: See the following citations for Pusha T, Travis Scott, and A Tribe Called Quest's appearances on the North American leg:)
| Date (2013) | City | Country | Venue | Opening act | Attendance | Revenue |
|---|---|---|---|---|---|---|
| October 19 | Seattle | United States | KeyArena | Kendrick Lamar | — | — |
| October 22 | San Jose | United States | SAP Center | Kendrick Lamar | 10,557 / 10,557 | $670,603 |
| October 23 | Oakland | United States | Oracle Arena | Kendrick Lamar | — | — |
| October 25 | Las Vegas | United States | MGM Grand Garden Arena | Pusha T Travis Scott | 10,183 / 10,183 | $748,055 |
| October 26 | Los Angeles | United States | Staples Center | Kendrick Lamar | 28,332 / 28,332 | $2,875,505 |
| October 28 | Los Angeles | United States | Staples Center | Kendrick Lamar | 28,332 / 28,332 | $2,875,505 |
| November 16 | Philadelphia | United States | Wells Fargo Center | Kendrick Lamar | — | — |
| November 17 | Boston | United States | TD Garden | Kendrick Lamar | — | — |
| November 19 | Brooklyn | United States | Barclays Center | Kendrick Lamar | 25,062 / 25,062 | $2,349,202 |
| November 20 | Brooklyn | United States | Barclays Center | A Tribe Called Quest | 25,062 / 25,062 | $2,349,202 |
| November 21 | Washington, D.C. | United States | Verizon Center | Kendrick Lamar | — | — |
| November 23 | New York City | United States | Madison Square Garden | Kendrick Lamar | — | — |
| November 24 | New York City | United States | Madison Square Garden | A Tribe Called Quest | — | — |
| November 27 | Nashville | United States | Bridgestone Arena | Kendrick Lamar | — | — |
| November 29 | Miami | United States | American Airlines Arena | Kendrick Lamar | — | — |
| November 30 | Tampa | United States | Tampa Bay Times Forum | Kendrick Lamar | — | — |
| December 1 | Atlanta | United States | Philips Arena | Kendrick Lamar | — | — |
| December 3 | Kansas City | United States | Sprint Center | Kendrick Lamar | — | — |
| December 5 | New Orleans | United States | New Orleans Arena | Kendrick Lamar | — | — |
| December 6 | Dallas | United States | American Airlines Center | Kendrick Lamar | — | — |
| December 7 | Houston | United States | Toyota Center | Kendrick Lamar | — | — |
| December 8 | San Antonio | United States | AT&T Center | Kendrick Lamar | — | — |
| December 10 | Phoenix | United States | US Airways Center | Kendrick Lamar | — | — |
| December 13 | Anaheim | United States | Honda Center | Kendrick Lamar | 12,503 / 12,503 | $940,846 |
| December 17 | Chicago | United States | United Center | Kendrick Lamar | 30,010 / 30,010 | $2,687,476 |
| December 18 | Chicago | United States | United Center | Kendrick Lamar | 30,010 / 30,010 | $2,687,476 |
| December 19 | Auburn Hills | United States | The Palace of Auburn Hills | Kendrick Lamar | 11,228 / 11,228 | $832,947 |
| December 22 | Toronto | Canada | Air Canada Centre | Kendrick Lamar | — | — |
| December 23 | Toronto | Canada | Air Canada Centre | Kendrick Lamar | — | — |

List of 2014 concerts
| Date (2014) | City | Country | Venue | Opening act | Attendance | Revenue |
|---|---|---|---|---|---|---|
| February 13 | University Park | United States | Bryce Jordan Center | —N/a | — | — |
| February 14 | Baltimore | United States | 1st Mariner Arena | —N/a | — | — |
| February 15 | Newark | United States | Prudential Center | —N/a | — | — |
| February 17 | Montreal | Canada | Bell Centre | —N/a | 6,173 / 7,437 | $504,130 |
| February 18 | Hamilton | Canada | Copps Coliseum | —N/a | — | — |
| February 19 | Albany | United States | Times Union Center | —N/a | — | — |
| February 21 | Uncasville | United States | Mohegan Sun Arena | —N/a | — | — |
| February 22 | Atlantic City | United States | Boardwalk Hall | —N/a | 7,789 / 10,018 | $507,157 |
| February 23 | Uniondale | United States | Nassau Veterans Memorial Coliseum | —N/a | — | — |
| September 5 | Perth | Australia | Perth Arena | Pusha T | 12,902 / 12,902 | $1,421,860 |
| September 7 | Adelaide | Australia | Adelaide Entertainment Centre | Pusha T | — | — |
| September 9 | Melbourne | Australia | Rod Laver Arena | Pusha T | 22,635 / 22,635 | $2,557,370 |
| September 10 | Melbourne | Australia | Rod Laver Arena | Pusha T | 22,635 / 22,635 | $2,557,370 |
| September 12 | Sydney | Australia | Qantas Credit Union Arena | Pusha T | 22,159 / 22,159 | $2,426,320 |
| September 13 | Sydney | Australia | Qantas Credit Union Arena | Pusha T | 22,159 / 22,159 | $2,426,320 |
| September 15 | Brisbane | Australia | Brisbane Entertainment Centre | Pusha T | — | — |

== Personnel ==
Musicians (Note: Taken from Pitchfork, apart from any musicians with citations next to their titles.)

- Kanye West – vocals
- Kendrick Lamar – vocals
- Pusha T – vocals
- Travis Scott – vocals
- A Tribe Called Quest – vocals
- Mano – DJ (Note: Mano served as the DJ until he announced he departed the tour on August 13, 2014, calling fans of West gay for obsessing over his departure.)
- Mike Dean – backing performer, guitar, bass, synths

Production and staging

- Elon Rutberg – creative director
- Alluxe – programming
- Vanessa Beecroft – scenographer, choreographer
- Yemi A.D. – stage director, choreographer
- Es Devlin – stage design
- Family – stage design
- John McGuire – stage design
- Oana Stanescu – stage design
- Virgil Abloh – stage design
- Maison Margiela – stage outfits

Crew

- Pascal Duvier – bodyguard
- Wes Lang – merchandise
- Jerry Lorenzo – merchandise

== See also ==
- The Holy Mountain (1973 film)
