= Coldest Winter (song) =

2008 song by Kanye West

Song by Kanye West

from the album 808s & Heartbreak
- Released: November 24, 2008
- Recorded: 2008
- Studio: Glenwood (Burbank, California); Avex Recording (Honolulu, Hawaii)
- Genre: Electropop
- Length: 2:44
- Label: Roc-A-Fella; Def Jam
- Songwriters: Kanye West; Ernest Wilson; Roland Orzabal
- Producer: Kanye West

Music video
- "Coldest Winter" on YouTube

"Coldest Winter" is a song by American rapper Kanye West from his fourth studio album, 808s & Heartbreak (2008). The song was produced by West, with co-production from No I.D. and Jeff Bhasker. The producers served as songwriters alongside Roland Orzabal, who received a writing credit as a result of music that he wrote being interpolated. In October 2008, the song was previewed via Power 106. An electropop number, it interpolates Tears for Fears' "Memories Fade". In the lyrics, Kanye mourns the death of his mother, Donda West.

"Coldest Winter" received generally positive reviews from music critics, who often commended its composition. Some focused their praise on West's performance, while numerous critics selected the song as an album highlight. It has been ranked among winter-related best songs lists by multiple publications, including NME and The Arizona Republic. Kanye West performed the song live in 2013 during The Yeezus Tour, frequently accompanying his performances by speaking about Donda's death. An accompanying music video premiered on February 22, 2010, which is soundtracked by a revamped version. Throughout the video, a bride is chased by Grim Reaper-style characters in a forest. Critics mostly gave the visual positive reviews, some of whom appreciated its dark style. Pentatonix covered the song in October 2016, before releasing a music video for the cover two months later.

== Background and recording ==
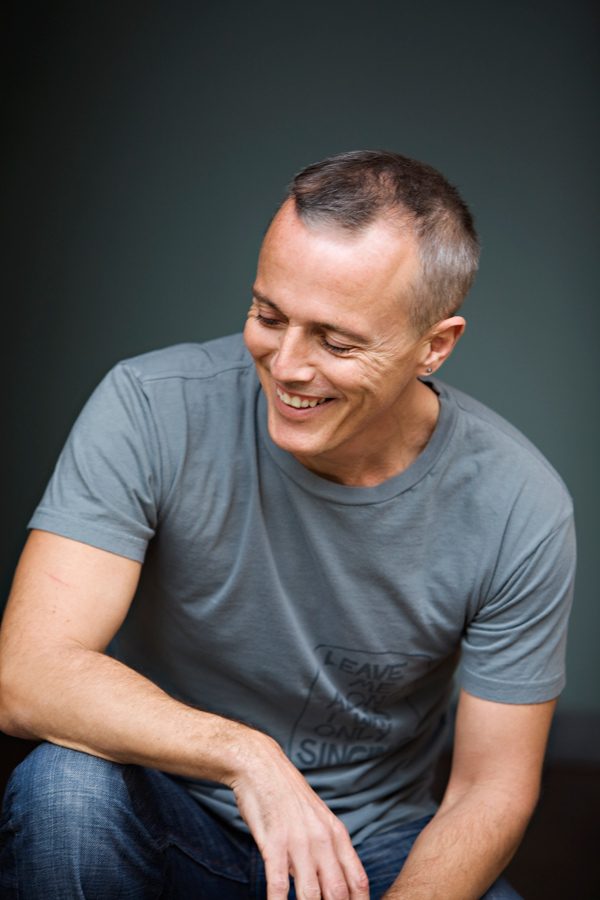
Tears for Fears member Curt Smith expressed a fondness for West's usage of the band's "Memories Fade" on the song.

Following the death of Kanye's mother Donda West, his mentor No I.D. was contacted by American rapper Malik Yusef, who told him to spend time with the artist. No I.D. initially rejected the decision due to their differing personalities, though later engaged in communication with Kanye West more after persuasion from Malik Yusef. West and No I.D. then travelled to Hawaii to work with rapper Jay-Z on his eleventh studio album The Blueprint 3 (2009), before the first of the three decided on transferring to working on 808s & Heartbreak in the state. The recording took place at Avex Recording Studio in Honolulu, Hawaii, and at Glenwood Studios in Burbank, California. West produced "Coldest Winter", while No I.D. and frequent West collaborator Jeff Bhasker served as co-producers. The producers were credited for writing the song, alongside Roland Orzabal of English pop rock band Tears for Fears, who received credit due to the interpolation of "Memories Fade".

On October 16, 2008, West premiered an excerpt of "Coldest Winter" on Power 106 in Los Angeles. No I.D. recalled to Complex in December 2011 that he sat at home in Atlanta and changed his lifestyle to what he described as "Cocaine 80s"; this is where he derived the group of the same name from. He remembered sitting around and listening to 1980s music, discovering "Memories Fade" from Tears for Fears' 1983 debut album The Hurting and instantly thinking: "That's it. Right here." No I.D. also said that he played "the whole section" to West, who proposed to change one word. However, No I.D. admitted to having "had no idea [West would] keep it as is", even though he realized the track was something special upon first listen. According to record producer 40, Canadian musician Drake "became crazily obsessed" with the melody on "Coldest Winter", which encouraged him to pay attention to the band. This ultimately led to Drake sampling fellow The Hurting track "Ideas as Opiates" on his third mixtape So Far Gone, released in 2009. Speaking to the Herald Sun in December 2017, Curt Smith of Tears for Fears saw it as "incredibly cool" and "very interesting" that West utilized work from the album despite him being of a "completely different genre" to the band. Kanye West's interest in music had been encouraged by Donda since he was young; the artist said she "always kept me around music" and "was also my first manager". West had often paid tribute to her in his tracks prior to "Coldest Winter", especially on "Hey Mama" (2005). The song was recorded during the three week period that West worked on the entirety of the album in 2008.

== Composition and lyrics ==
Musically, "Coldest Winter" is a minimalist electropop number. The production of the song is constructed around "Memories Fade" by Tears for Fears, written by Orzabal, while West delivers an interpolation of its vocal hook on the chorus. The song features tribal drums, which were created using the Roland TR-909 drum machine and appear on the chorus. It contains descending synths, mostly accompanying the verses. Keyboards are also included, contributed by Bhasker, while West utilizes Auto-Tune to sing throughout.

Lyrically, "Coldest Winter" serves as Kanye West's tribute to Donda after he became depressed following her death. A call and response is featured when West sings certain lines, such as "On lonely nights, I start to fade / Her love's a thousand miles away". West also reminisces on memories that he made in "the coldest winter". On the chorus, he repeats the couplet "Goodbye my friend / Will I ever love again?" thrice. To close out the song, West sings the couplet with the alteration of the last line to "I won't ever love again".

== Release and reception ==
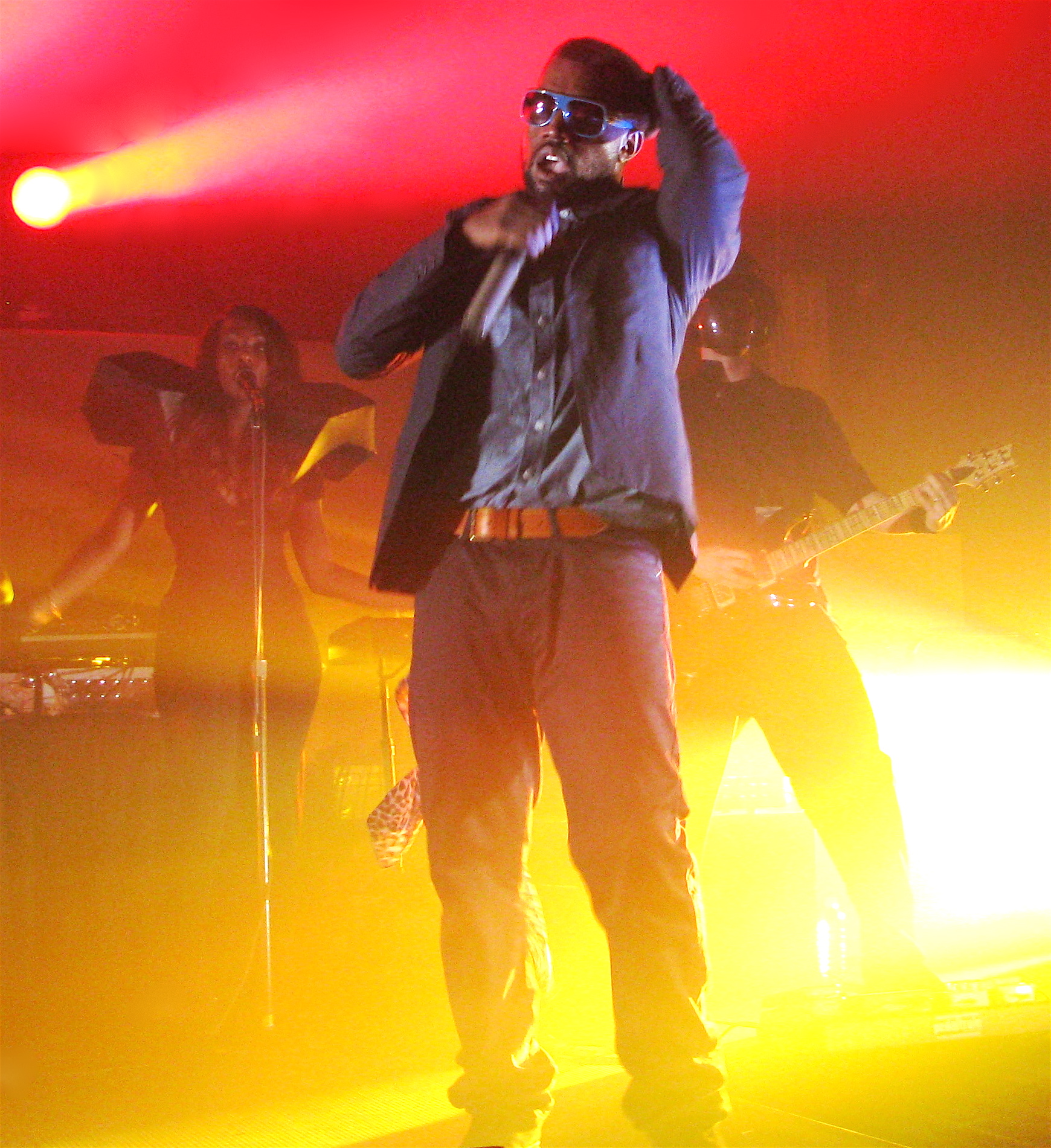
West's performance was complimented by various reviewers; they commonly highlighted his subject matter.

On November 24, 2008, "Coldest Winter" was released as the eleventh track on West's fourth studio album 808s & Heartbreak. The song was met with generally positive reviews from music critics, mostly being praised for its composition. The staff of The Observer pointed to the song as one of the album's tracks to download, alongside comparing its "frosty synths" to raw Detroit techno. Scott Plagenhoef of Pitchfork chose the song as one of the album's highlights, focusing particularly on the "909 and descending synth". Greg Kot from the Chicago Tribune detailed that on 808s & Heartbreak, West discovers "a hole in his life that keeps getting larger" until he reaches "Coldest Winter", which he dubbed as "a eulogy for his mother". Kot further remarked that West's voice "floats over tribal drums", describing the instrument as channeling "passion into a song that sounds like it's slowly bleeding to death". At The New York Times, Jon Caramanica offered that the "thunderous drums cut[ting] through an electro haze" on the song are suggestive of West's "old, oversize sound". Andy Kellman from AllMusic noticed West "longs for his departed mother" on the song, while praising its usage of "the most desolate song" from Hurting.

Writing for the Chicago Sun-Times, Jim DeRogatis favored West's level of eloquentness on the song to that of fellow album track "Pinocchio Story", specifically acclaiming his lyrical content, as well as noting it as an instance of where West's Auto-Tune usage is "touching and very effective" on the album. Cara Nash from No Ripcord saw the song as "an ode to [West's] mother" that would work perfectly as the record's closing track. RapReviews author Jesal 'Jay Soul' Padania felt the song is the only one on 808s & Heartbreak that seems real due to delving into "the death of [West's] mother", and his involvement in the death. In a review of the album at USA Today, Steve Jones recommended the song as one of the tracks to download, a selection shared by IGN's Alfred H. Leonard, III. Dave Heaton of PopMatters held a moderately positive opinion, affirming that the song's "machine-gun blast of electric fuzz and funky drums" redeem it from possibly resembling a ballad by Seal. Spin journalist Charles Aaron estimated the track nears success "as a haunting refrain, with its bursts of static and chilly '80s synths", though fails to function as a song. In a somewhat negative review for The Village Voice, Tom Breihan stated the song comes across as "designed to humanize all the bile" that it succeeds on the album, though criticized how the result is generally West "sound[ing] like he's falling apart". Breihan continued, calling the usage of Tears for Fears' material "sighing" and complaining about how "unsettling" it is to hear West utilizing breakup language.

=== Accolades ===
"Coldest Winter" was listed by NME as the seventh greatest song about snow in 2018, with Jordan Bassett commenting that West's question of "Will I ever love again?" ends up having "a happy ending" due to him bonding with his then-wife Kim Kardashian's family. The track was placed at the same position by the East Bay Times on their 2019 list of the top 25 songs for the winter season; Jim Harrington of the newspaper saw it as demonstrating West "at his heartbreaking best". On a 2021 list of the best snow songs during the winter weather, Time Out ranked the song at number nine, and the magazine's Andrew Frisicano asserted that it "is a tragic, haunting thumper". Glamour writer Anna Moeslein selected the track as one of her favorite songs about winter in 2014, while Ed Masley from The Arizona Republic named it as among the classic songs about the season the following year. In April 2020, GQ editor-in-chief Will Welch picked the song as one of the 50 greatest hits to listen to in self-quarantine during the COVID-19 pandemic.

== Music video ==
=== Background ===
A music video for "Coldest Winter" was debuted via iTunes on February 22, 2010, and shared by American director Nabil Elderkin to his Vimeo page the next day. This release marked West's return to the public eye after his outburst at the 2009 MTV Video Music Awards, which came 15 months after 808s & Heartbreak had been released. The visual was directed by Elderkin, who had previously worked with West on multiple occasions, including directing the videos for fellow album tracks "Welcome to Heartbreak" and "Paranoid". On the day of the former's release, Elderkin informed MTV that the video differed from any previous collaborations, confirming it is "pretty minimalistic", and "slow and very visual". He opened up about "want[ing] to catch the vibe of the song" without being too literal, deciding on this due to the lyrics' heavy closeness to West and how they "go much deeper than the video" through their emotion. The video treatment was written by Elderkin, who called it "a boundary-pushing effort" compared to his past work with West. He further affirmed the two tried a new style for the visual medium that challenged him more especially, as West missed the editing process and only saw the final version. Elderkin also admitted in another MTV interview that West not appearing in the video was funnily his own decision, nor did he want to put him in. The director confirmed West lacked interest in being in the visual for "Paranoid" too and had more appearances until parts were removed, further saying West was fine at the time "with putting out visuals that fit the song" no matter if he is present. Concluding, Elderkin stated that "he's in that place in his life where right now he just wants to make art", and insisted the music video is intentionally open for interpretation.

The visual features a slightly revamped version of "Coldest Winter", similarly to how a new mix of "Paranoid" was used for its music video. Elderkin defined the version as "more of a haunting one" due to being a remix of sorts, assuming that nobody has heard it before. The director recalled how West "did some really amazing sound work" to the version, revealing he was more involved in its production than that of the original. Rolling Stone's Daniel Kreps said the mix is "gloomier and more foreboding" than the original, while Stereogum writer Gabe Delahaye asserted that it shows "[t]otal beat wraith" from West, who adopts an attitude of "one beat to rule them all!"

=== Synopsis ===
A purple color palette is used for the music video, which begins with shots of a bride dressed in white and Grim Reaper-style characters interspersed by ones of a dark, winter forest. Various shots in the video depict her running through the forest, being pursued by the characters. The same actions are shown in slow motion as the video progresses, with the woman also looking in varying directions at points. She later falls over but quickly stands back up and looks around herself, before running from the Grim Reapers again. The bride continues to run away until she leaps off a cliff, being absorbed by dark forces.

=== Reception ===
The music video was met with mostly positive reception from critics. The staff of Rap-Up branded West's absence as "haunting", elaborating that the video is "equally chilling" to the gloomy song. Ryan Dombal from Pitchfork called the visual "equally bleak" to "Coldest Winter", which he saw as the "starkest track" from 808s & Heartbreak. Furthermore, he compared certain visual features to TV series Baywatch and Tim Burton's film Sleepy Hollow (1999). Reviewing for Idolator, Becky Bain branded the video "awesomely cool". She felt the depiction of West's "own mug" being replaced with "a cleavage-baring, Leona Lewis look-a-like in the spooky, surreal vid" was a smart strategy from him. Expressing a more critical sentiment, Entertainment Weekly's Simon Vozick-Levinson found the music video to be slightly "underwhelming"; he showed a preference for West to release new music instead.

== Live performances and other usage ==
West opened his appearance at Cirprian Wall Street in New York City for G-Shock's Shock the World 2009 campaign with a performance of "Coldest Winter", wearing a black face mask for the performance. For Kanye's kickoff show of The Yeezus Tour at Seattle's KeyArena on October 20, 2013, he performed "Coldest Winter" as his 11th track. Kanye transitioned into performing from sharing a story about the moment he had got off a plane and discovered Donda had died: "They told me that my mother was no longer here and I could never speak to her again." During the performance, his triangular center stage elevated and fake snow fell down. On October 26, 2013, Kanye sang the song in Auto-Tune as part of a concert at Staples Center in Los Angeles on the tour, with him lying on the edge of a fake silver mountain cliff at the stage's edge. As he performed and outstretched his arm over the cliff, the fake sky went dark and mock snow came down. Kanye also stated that he wrote the song for Donda. He performed the song as the 12th number of his concert at Barclays Center in Brooklyn, New York for the tour on November 20, 2013, while lying atop the peak of a mountain and watching lake-effect snow fall down that was made out of bubbles. At the same time, a Yeti with glowing red eyes lurked around the mountain and Kanye was surrounded by bright lights. Kanye accompanied the performance by explaining to the crowd that he wrote the song after Donda died. The artist delivered a performance of the song for The Yeezus Tour's stop at Madison Square Garden on November 24, 2013, during which he told the story of how he wrote the song after Donda's death.

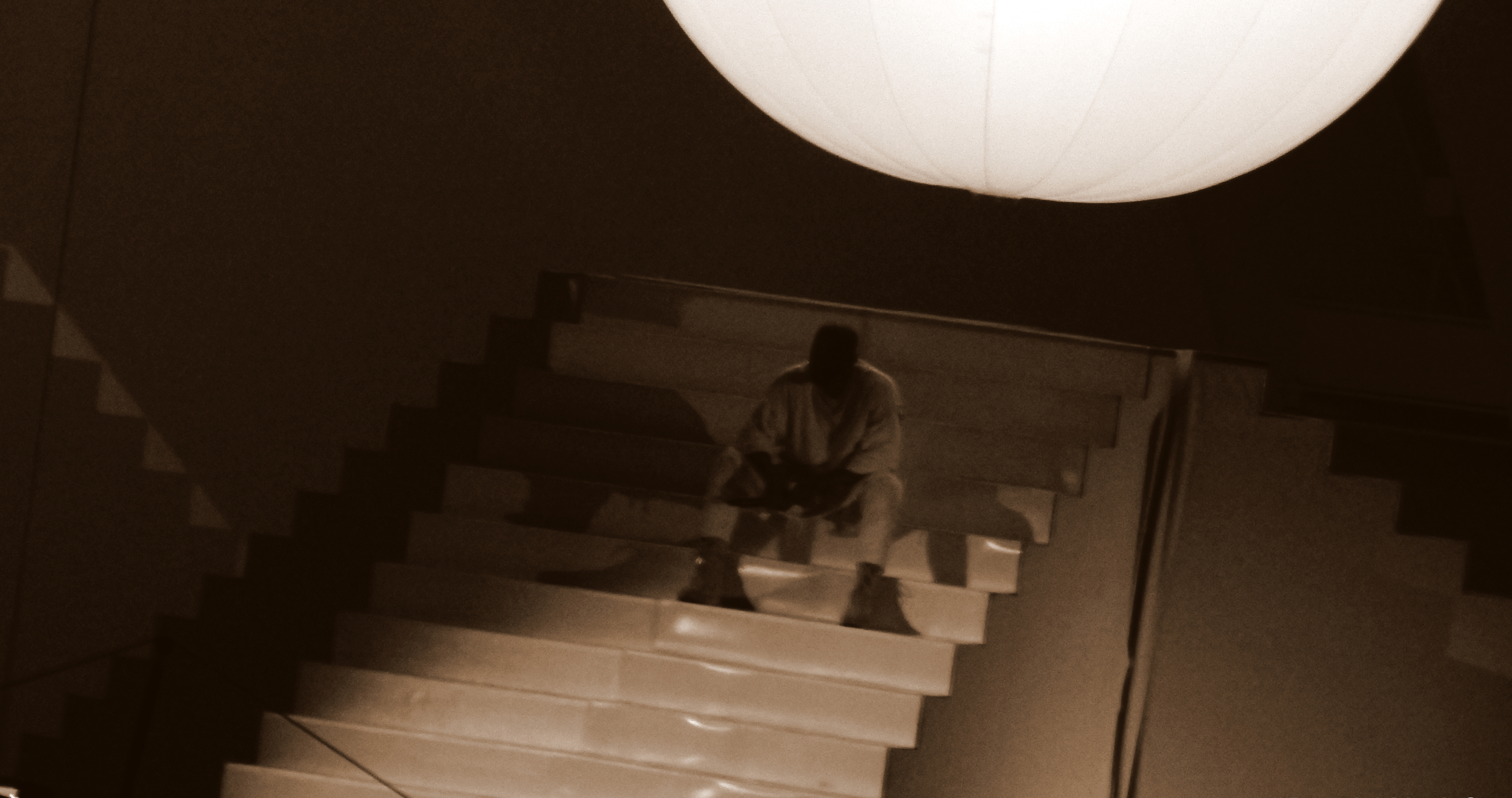
Kanye sat on a large staircase and strongly memorialized Donda West during his performance of the song at the 2015 Hollywood Bowl.

For Kanye's two night concert of 808s & Heartbreak in full at the 2015 Hollywood Bowl in September, he performed the song as the set's 11th track. He rocked loose garments in white and off-white shades while performing, being backed by a small band and a medium-sized orchestra. At the start of the performance, numerous women dressed in ivory sheaths and hijabs wheeled out a slab depicting a woman in repose to conduct her funeral. Fake snow fell from above the audience that quickly melted in the local heat, simultaneously with Kanye sitting on a large staircase and heavily memorializing Donda. Once the performance reached its closing violins, Kanye West exited the stage. "Coldest Winter" was covered by a cappella group Pentatonix for their fifth studio album A Pentatonix Christmas in October 2016, with them using their voices as instruments and delivering harmonies. Two months later, the group released an accompanying music video that sees a snowman taking a journey through love in the holidays.

== Credits and personnel ==
Information taken from 808s & Heartbreak liner notes.

Recording

- Recorded at Glenwood Studios (Burbank, California) and Avex Recording Studio (Honolulu, Hawaii)

Personnel

- Kanye West – songwriter, producer
- No I.D. – songwriter, co-producer
- Roland Orzabal – songwriter
- Jeff Bhasker – co-producer, keyboards
- Andrew Dawson – recorder
- Anthony Kilhoffer – recorder
- Chad Carlisle – assistant recorder
- Isha Erskine – assistant recorder
- Gaylord Holomalia – assistant recorder
- Christian Mochizuki – assistant recorder
- Manny Marroquin – mix engineer
- Christian Plata – assistant engineer
- Erik Madrid – assistant engineer
