= 808s & Heartbreak =

2008 studio album by Kanye West

Studio album by Kanye West
- Released: November 24, 2008
- Recorded: September–October 2008
- Studios: Avex (Honolulu); Glenwood (Burbank)
- Genres: Electropop; art pop; synth-pop
- Length: 51:58
- Labels: Roc-A-Fella; Def Jam
- Producer: Kanye West

Kanye West chronology
Graduation (2007)	808s & Heartbreak (2008)	VH1 Storytellers (2010)

Singles from 808s & Heartbreak
- 1. "Love Lockdown" Released: September 18, 2008; 2. "Heartless" Released: October 28, 2008; 3. "Amazing" Released: March 10, 2009; 4. "Paranoid" Released: March 23, 2009

808s & Heartbreak is the fourth studio album by the American rapper Kanye West. It was released through Def Jam Recordings and Roc-A-Fella Records on November 24, 2008. West recorded it between September and October 2008 at Glenwood Studios in Burbank, California and Avex Recording Studio in Honolulu, Hawaii, and produced it with assistance from No I.D., Plain Pat, Jeff Bhasker, and Mr Hudson. Guest appearances include Kid Cudi, Young Jeezy, Mr Hudson, and Lil Wayne.

West conceived 808s & Heartbreak following the death of his mother Donda in November 2007 and his breakup with his then-fiancée Alexis Phifer in April 2008. It marked a major artistic departure from his previous hip-hop records; West mostly sings instead of rapping, with vocals processed through Auto-Tune against an electronic production and minimalist sonic palette, including prominent use of minor keys and the Roland TR-808 drum machine. Lyrical themes include loss, heartache, and West's struggles with pop stardom.

808s & Heartbreak's announcement bewildered audiences, who were taken aback by its departure from West's previous work, but it debuted atop the Billboard 200 and received positive reviews, with praise for West's experimentation. It was promoted with four singles, including "Love Lockdown", which became the highest Billboard Hot 100 debut of West's career, and "Heartless", which was certified septuple platinum by the Recording Industry Association of America (RIAA). Numerous publications named 808s & Heartbreak one of the best albums of 2008, and its third single, "Amazing", was nominated for Best Rap Performance by a Duo or Group at the 52nd Grammy Awards.

Music journalists regard 808s & Heartbreak as one of West's most influential albums, as it had an immediate impact on hip-hop, pop, and R&B music; many rappers, singers, and producers adopted its stylistic and thematic elements. It has been credited with pioneering the emo rap and experimental R&B subgenres. In 2014, Rolling Stone named it one of the most groundbreaking albums, and in 2020, listed it among the 500 greatest albums. 808s & Heartbreak sold 1.7 million copies in the US by 2013; in 2026, it received a quadruple platinum certification from the RIAA.

== Background ==
808s came from suffering multitude losses at the same time—it's like losing an arm and a leg and having to find a way to keep walking through it.

— Kanye West (2008)

After the release of his third studio album Graduation in 2007, Kanye West experienced profoundly-affecting events in his personal life. On November 10, his mother Donda West died due to complications from cosmetic surgery involving an abdominoplasty and breast reduction. Months later, in April 2008, West and his fiancée Alexis Phifer ended their engagement and long-term relationship, which had begun in 2002. At the same time, West was struggling to adapt to a newfound pop stardom he had once wanted, often becoming the subject of media scrutiny. His feelings of loss, loneliness, and longing for companionship and a sense of normality inspired 808s & Heartbreak. West later said, "this album was therapeutic – it's lonely at the top."

West felt that his emotions could not be fully expressed simply through rapping, which he said had limitations. There were "melodies that were in me", he explained. "What was in me I couldn't stop." Wanting to create a pop album, West dismissed the contemporary backlash to the concept of pop music and expressed admiration for what some pop stars had accomplished in their careers. West acknowledged the criticism of the album by saying that he can't be judged on a reflection of his "heart and soul", which would be like attempting to judge a grandmother's love. The rapper later stated that he wished to present the music as a new genre called "pop art", clarifying that he was well-aware of the visual art movement of the same name and wished to present a musical equivalent. He elaborated: "Either call it 'pop' or 'pop art,' either one I'm good with".

== Recording and production ==
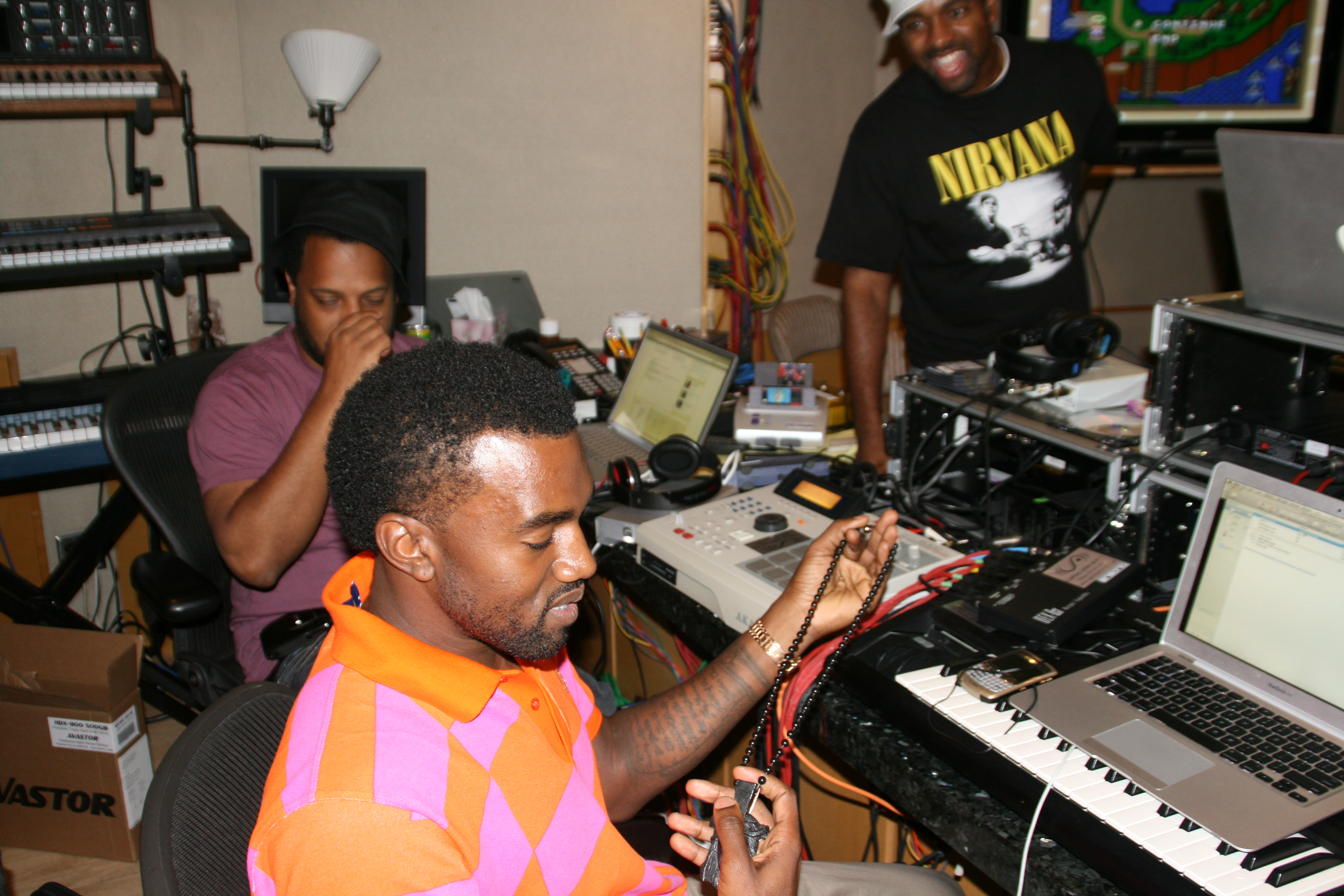
West (center) working on the album with producer and former mentor No I.D. (left)

The album was recorded over a span of approximately three weeks from September to October 2008. Recording sessions took place at Glenwood Studios in Burbank, California and at Avex Recording Studio in Honolulu, Hawaii. The 808 of the title is a reference to the Roland TR-808 drum machine, used heavily in the album. Drawing inspiration from 1980s synth-pop and electropop performers such as Phil Collins, Gary Numan, TJ Swan, and Boy George, West felt that the 808 was a resourceful instrument that could be used to evoke emotion; the concept was introduced to him by Jon Brion. West utilized the sounds created by the 808 and manipulated its pitch to produce a distorted, electronic sound, an effect he referred to as "heartbreak". He felt the characteristic of the sound was representative of his state of mind. According to West, the fact that Hawaii's area code was "808" was coincidental, as he had already developed the album's title before being informed. The realization inspired him to pursue his direction with the album, however. In terms of musical direction, West's intentions, according to Mike Dean, were to defy the typical sound of hip-hop beats, instead evoking the presence of tribal drums. Overall, West maintained a "minimal but functional" approach to producing the album.

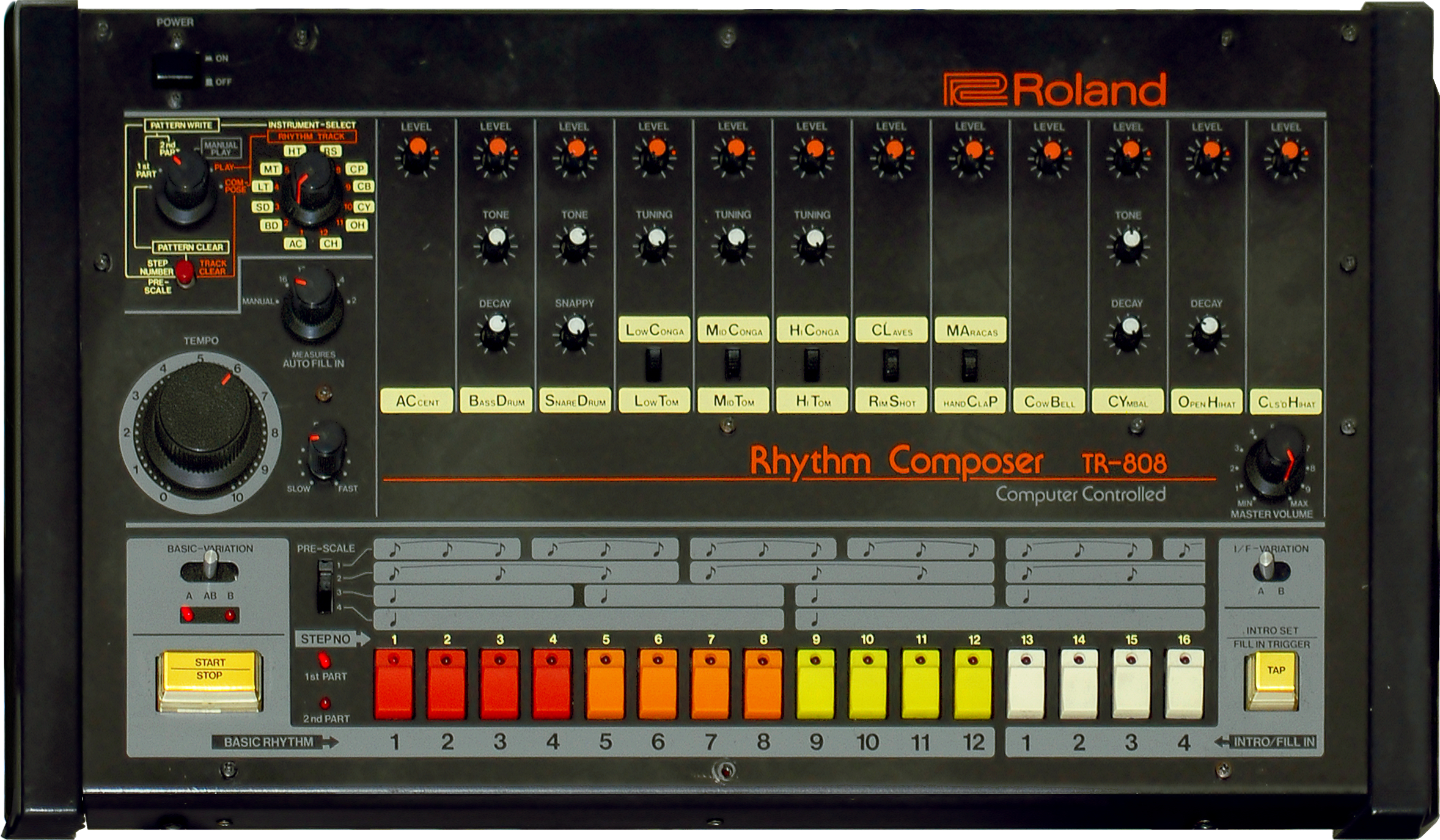
The Roland TR-808, the drum machine which served as a primary instrument on the album

West credits rapper Kid Cudi, who had signed to his GOOD Music record label, with helping create the album's stark, brooding sound. After receiving a copy of his 2008 mixtape A Kid Named Cudi, West became an avid fan, especially of the hit single "Day 'n' Nite". West surprised Kid Cudi with a phone call and asked him to fly to Hawaii to work on 808s & Heartbreak. The pair worked together in the studio while having films such as Close Encounters of the Third Kind play silently in the background. Ultimately, Kid Cudi co-wrote four songs on 808s & Heartbreak, the first being the chorus for "Heartless". West told Rolling Stone, "His writing is just so pure and natural and important. [That's] more important than where things chart." No I.D., West's collaborator and former mentor, added that tracks for the album also originated from their concurrent recording for Jay-Z's The Blueprint 3 (2009). "Matter of fact, when we did 'Heartless,' [West] just stopped and said, 'No.' I was like, 'No what?' He was like, 'No way! This is my record!'", as No I.D. recalled. "I was like, 'Come on, man. Can we just finish the guy's album?' He was like, 'Nope. I'm doing an album.'"

For his vocals on 808s & Heartbreak, West employed the voice-audio processor technology of Auto-Tune. He had experimented with it on his 2004 debut album The College Dropout, specifically the background vocals of "Jesus Walks" and "Never Let Me Down", but he had not used the technology for lead vocals until 2008. "We were working on the remixes for Lil Wayne's 'Lollipop' and Young Jeezy's 'Put On' and he fell in love with the Auto-Tune", producer Mike Dean recalled. Towards the end, West enlisted T-Pain for coaching on how to utilize the technology. In an interview with Billboard, T-Pain said that West told him he had listened to his debut album Rappa Ternt Sanga (2005) before making 808s & Heartbreak. T-Pain also claimed that West brought him in to make 808s sound more like his debut album. West stated that he loved using Auto-Tune and dismissed notions from those who did not like the technology. At a listening event, he considered it "the funnest thing to use". West went on to state that he appreciates how Auto-Tune makes it clear when he sings off-key, enabling him to "sing more perfect".

Young Jeezy contributed a rap verse on the track "Amazing" while "See You in My Nightmares" is a duet with Lil Wayne. Singer-songwriter Esthero provided the few female vocals found on the album; credited under birth name Jenny-Bea Englishman, she co-wrote three tracks. When "RoboCop" appeared on the Internet, West disclaimed responsibility and was upset that the leak had occurred as the track was an unfinished version. Mike Dean had previously stated that the track was expected to receive additional treatment by jazz musician Herbie Hancock before the album's release.

== Music and lyrics ==
"Welcome to Heartbreak"
The song's minimal, emotive, and rhythmic instrumental underscores an account of West's existential crisis.

808s & Heartbreak is a radical departure from West's previous hip-hop albums. According to The Independent, West abandoned his customary hip-hop sound in favor of sparse, drum machine-based electropop. Pitchfork's Scott Plagenhoef described the album as "an introspective, minimal electro-pop record," and 33 1/3 writer Kirk Walker Graves categorized it as avant-garde electropop. In the opinion of Rolling Stone's Brian Hiatt, the record is a "downbeat detour into depressive electro pop," while another writer for the magazine called it an "introspective, synthpop album".

The music of 808s & Heartbreak draws heavily on electronic elements, particularly virtual synthesis, the Roland TR-808 drum machine, and explicitly auto-tuned vocal tracks. Tracks on the album utilize step input drum machine and synth-bass parts. Step input sequencing, a product of vintage analogue devices limited to recording only 16 individual notes, was popular in music production during the 1980s, but also became available in digital workstations. The album's music features austere production and elements such as dense drums, lengthy strings, droning synths, and somber piano. Andy Kellman of AllMusic writes of the music, "Several tracks have almost as much in common with irrefutably bleak post-punk albums, such as New Order's Movement and The Cure's Pornography, as contemporary rap and R&B". These musical elements help convey moods of despair and dejection that reflect the album's subject matter. For The A.V. Club, Nathan Rabin described the album's music as "split[ting] the difference between the auto-tune R&B of T-Pain and the glacial electronic atmospherics of '80s new wave at its loneliest". NJ.com columnist Trist McCall wrote that the record "stripped modern art-pop down to its iconic rudiments — beats, charismatic personalities, hand-selected melodies, and computer-assisted vocals".

West's singing has been characterized as "flat" and "nearly unmelodic", which "underscores his own cyborgish detachment". His voice was compared to the fictional artificial intelligence character HAL 9000, channeling a robotic sound. Andre Grant of HipHopDX wrote that "to combat this trenchant melancholia, he poured himself into an all-autotunes R&B album" which would prove divisive in hip-hop. Canadian writer Stephen Marche viewed that West used "the shallow musical gimmickry of Auto-Tune, a program designed to eliminate individuality, and produced a hauntingly personal album". Nekesa Mumbi Moody of Associated Press described 808s & Heartbreak as uneven, citing West's experimental off-key singing.

"Paranoid"
The song describes a lover who is alienating the narrator with her distrustful thinking.

Most of West's lyrics are directed at an ex-lover. In Robert Christgau's opinion, 808s & Heartbreak is a "slow, sad-ass and self-involved ... breakup album," while Plagenhoef found it "steeped in regret, pain, and even more self-examination than a typical Kanye West album". West refers to an ex-lover's treatment of him as "the coldest story ever told" on "Heartless", and on "RoboCop", she is called a "spoiled little L.A. girl" comparable to the antagonist in the 1990 film Misery. On "Paranoid", West describes a lover who "worries about the wrong things" and is pushing him away with her distrustful ways of thinking. With the introspective "Love Lockdown", West discusses the aftermath of a failed romantic relationship.

Among other themes, existential crisis is explored on "Welcome to Heartbreak", in which West's character dispassionately recounts sitting alone on a flight, with a laughing family seated behind him. The song harbors lament over the cost of past decisions and feelings of emptiness in a life of fame and luxury. West longs for his late mother on the album's penultimate track "Coldest Winter". The track contains an interpolation of the desolate 1983 song "Memories Fade" by Tears for Fears. According to Christgau, the closing "Pinocchio Story" is "the only track here about what's really bringing [West] down: not the loss of his girlfriend but the death of his mother, during cosmetic surgery that somewhere not too deep down he's sure traces all too directly to his alienated fame".

== Marketing ==
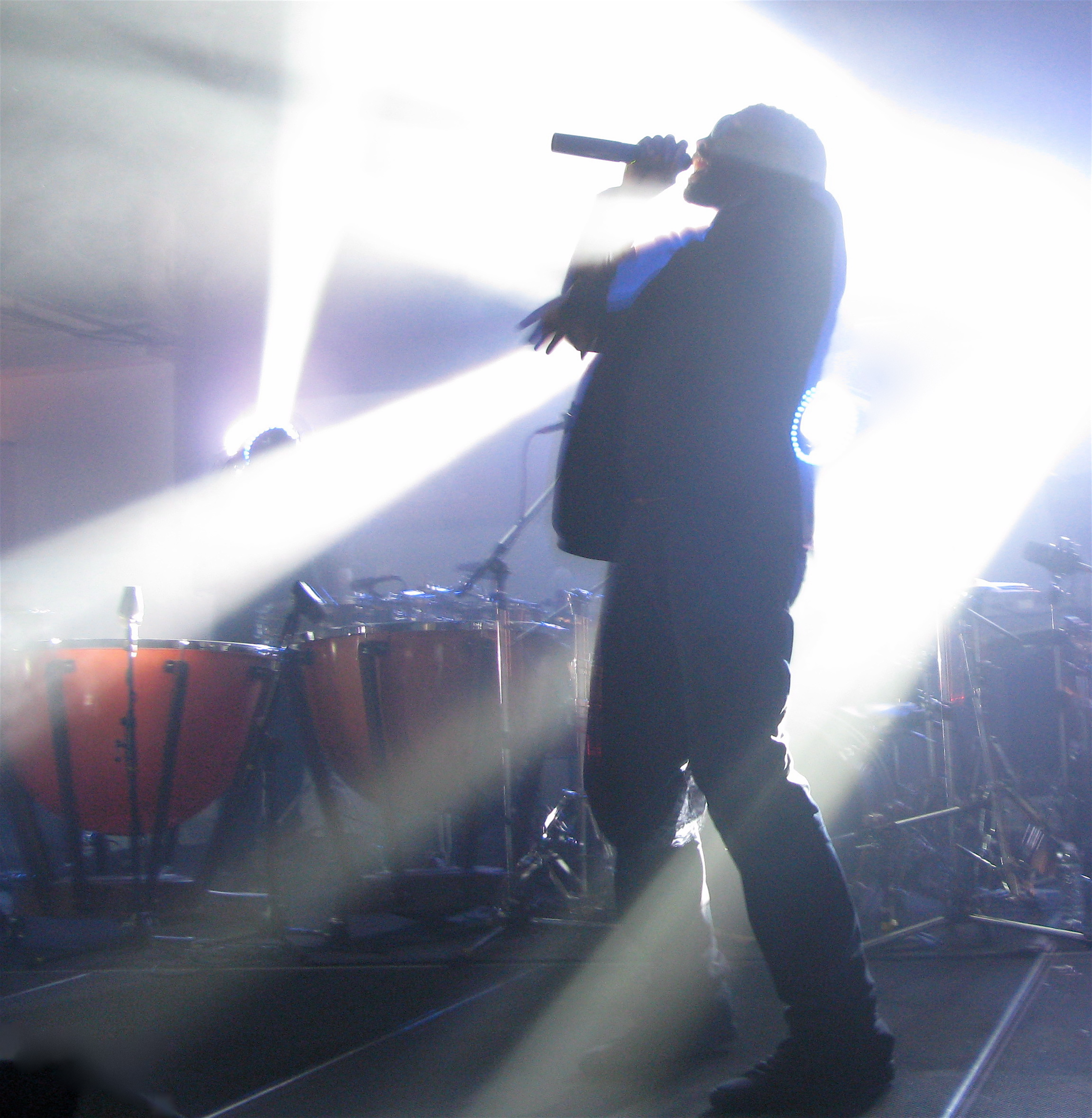
West performing at the 2008 Democratic National Convention leading up to the album's release

In August 2008, West performed at the Democratic National Convention, where he also previewed a demo of "Love Lockdown" to Dave Sirulnick, a producer for MTV. This led to West's premier of the song at the 2008 MTV Video Music Awards on September 7, performing alongside 20 taiko drummers. On the set's dark-violet stage, he appeared wearing an Afro-mullet and a gray tweed jacket tailored with a broken-heart-shaped pin that would symbolize the 808s & Heartbreak-album era in West's career, according to Rolling Stone writer Charles Holmes: "His voice wavered, his onstage confidence was clearly fragile, but the 808s epoch began nonetheless."

On September 24, 2008, West announced that he had finished the album and would be releasing it sometime in November. In his blog post, he wrote "I changed my album to November something cause I finished the album and I felt like it..I want y'all to hear it as soon as possible." West later stated that the album would be released on November 25, 2008. However, Island Def Jam, the distributing label, brought the date forward by one day to capitalize on Thanksgiving weekend. A special edition of the album was later released on December 16, featuring the album in CD and dual LP format, along with album artwork redone by Kaws, the original cover artist.

On October 16, 2008, West premiered an excerpt of "Coldest Winter" on the radio station Power 106 in Los Angeles. The track interpolates Tears for Fears' "Memories Fade". A remixed version of "Paranoid" was reported to feature pop singer Rihanna, but did not materialize. Also appearing prior to the release were "See You in My Nightmares", "Street Lights", and "Welcome to Heartbreak". A hidden track on 808s & Heartbreak, "Pinocchio Story" is a freestyle that was recorded live in Singapore. It was included as part of the album at the request of American musician Beyoncé.

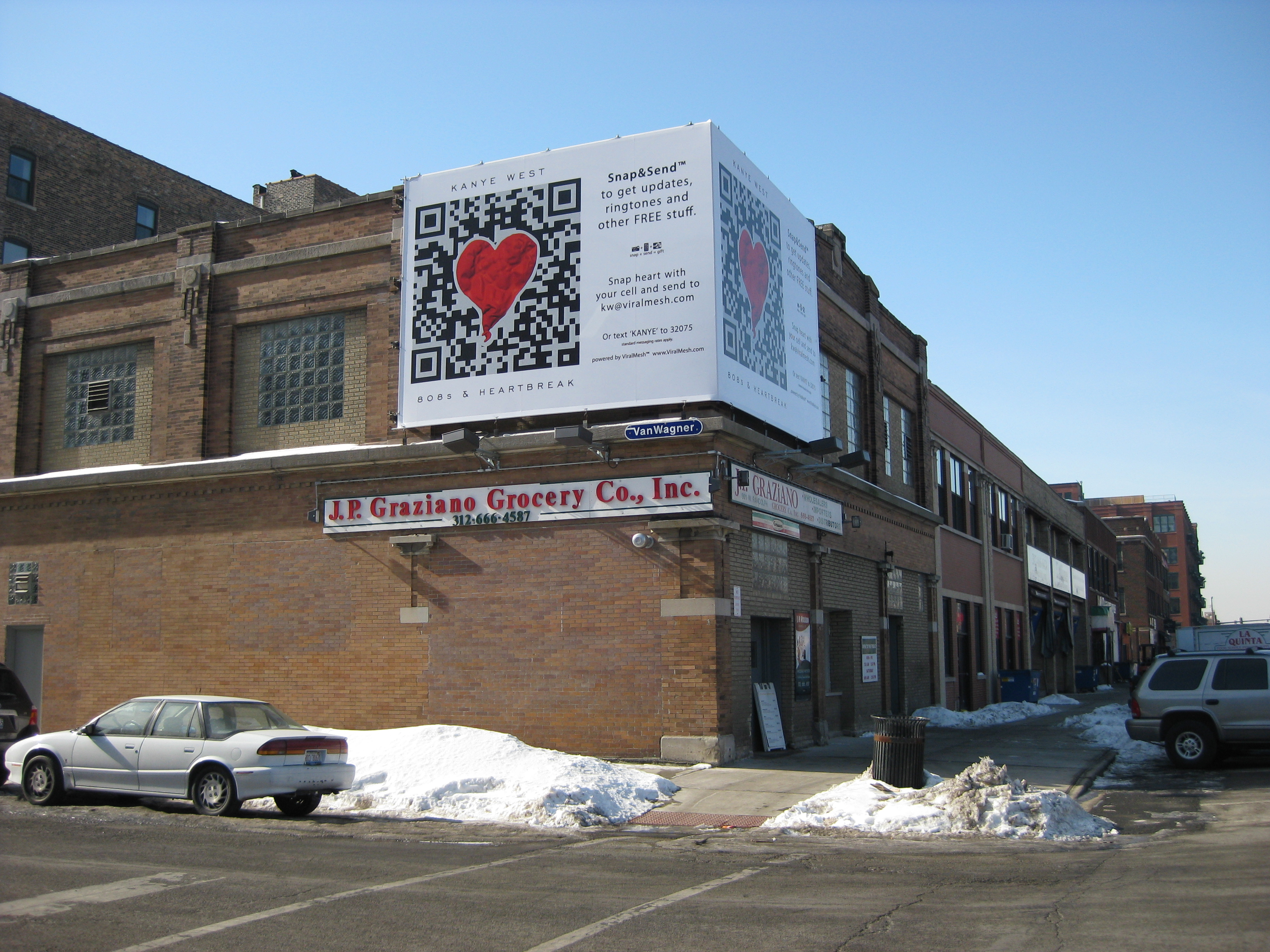
A billboard advertising the album in Chicago, 2009

On October 14, 2008, West collaborated with Italian artist Vanessa Beecroft in hosting a promotional album listening event at Ace Gallery. Over 700 guests were invited to preview the entirety of 808s & Heartbreak. Under Beecroft's guidance, the event featured approximately forty nude women wearing nothing besides wool masks who silently stood in the center of the room. The entire album played without introduction or explanation. The women were illuminated by multicolored lights that would change as the music progressed. When it came time for him to speak, West stated that he'd been a fan of Beecroft's work and strong imagery, saying that he liked the idea of nudity because "society told us to wear clothes at a certain point." Beecroft had been contacted a month prior and conceptualized and generated the installation in a week. Beecroft admitted that while he had caught her offguard, she had the opportunity to hear the album for herself and heard things that touched her own life. Attendees included Mos Def, will.i.am and Rick Ross. Five days later, promotional photos for the album by photographer Willy Vanderperre were released. The images portrayed West wearing a grey glen plaid suit, large browline glasses, and a heart-shaped pin.

The artwork for 808s & Heartbreak followed the minimalist style of the album. The cover art features a deflated heart-shaped balloon. It was photographed by Kristen Yiengst and designed by Virgil Abloh and Willo Perron, and the deluxe edition's artwork was made by pop artist Kaws. The album's artwork also includes photographs of West, taken by Willy Vanderperre, and a photograph of West kissing his mother on the cheek, taken by Danny Clinch. In 2013, Complex named it the best rap album cover of the past five years.

In October 2009, West was scheduled to embark on a tour, Fame Kills: Starring Kanye West and Lady Gaga, in promotion of 808s & Heartbreak and Lady Gaga's The Fame Monster. It was canceled on October 1, 2009, without explanation. Several songs from the album were performed by West during his live VH1 Storytellers performance, such as "Heartless", "Amazing" and "Say You Will".

== Public reaction ==
It wasn't really the traditional Kanye hip-hop album. He went out of the box, which some people loved, but for others, it took a while to grow on them.

— Jermaine Hall, Vibe editor-in-chief (2009)

Before its release, reaction to 808s & Heartbreak was mixed, ranging from anticipation to bewilderment and indifference to the album's concept. Upon the premier of "Love Lockdown" at the 2008 MTV Video Music Awards, music audiences were taken aback by the uncharacteristic production style and the presence of Auto-Tune. The negative feedback intensified when West revealed that the entire album would be primarily sung with Auto-Tune rather than rapped and would focus on themes of love and heartache.

Numerous hip-hop fans and certain rappers mocked West for becoming "sappy" while others deemed the upcoming LP as a throwaway experimental album. Comparisons were drawn to Electric Circus, an album recorded by West's labelmate and close friend Common. MTV eventually interviewed Common to share his thoughts and views on the artistic direction of the album. Common expressed both his understanding and his support for West's intentions, stating "I love it. I'mma tell you, as an artist, you wanna be free. I'mma do what I feel. You can't just cater to the audience. You gotta say, 'Hey, y'all, this is where I'm at.' For him to do an album called 808s and Heartbreak, you know that's where he is at this moment. I heard some songs, and I think it's fresh. I think the people are ready for it."

West received similar approval from Lil Wayne and Young Jeezy, both of whom contributed to the album. During an interview, when asked what music today inspires him, Wayne stated "everybody's doing their thing, but they're not exciting. Everybody is doing the same thing. That's terrible. Do I love the music that's out right now? I love it with a passion. Does it motivate me? Not one bit. That's because 808s & Heartbreak isn't out yet." Despite the approval from the rap superstars, as well as the record-breaking chart performances of the first two singles, hip-hop audiences remained indifferent towards the album, predicting it would flop. Responding to reviews, West stated that he didn't care about sales or getting good ratings, saying that it came from the heart and that's all that matters to him. When asked about the current state of hip-hop, West compared it to a high school, stating that hip-hop used to be all about being fearless and standing out, and that now it is about being afraid and fitting in. Michael Jackson was an admirer of the album, with his daughter Paris saying he played it for her "all the time." West went on to assert in October 2015 that despite many people rating his successor album My Beautiful Dark Twisted Fantasy as his best, 808s & Heartbreak is "so much stronger" in comparison.

=== Sales ===
In its first week of sales, 808s & Heartbreak reached the number one spot on the US Billboard 200 with sales of 450,000 album-equivalent units, significantly underselling Graduation in spite of an extra day of sales amidst a holiday week. The following week, the album descended three places to number four on the chart and experienced a 69% sales decline, selling 142,000 units. In the last week of 2008, 808s & Heartbreak sold 165,100 album-equivalent units, jumping six places from the eleventh spot to number five on the Billboard 200. It was reported to have sold 1,023,000 units by the end of 2008, of which 183,000 came from digital sales. The album moved up again in the first week of 2009, selling 70,000 album-equivalent units and landing at number three. On January 27, 2009, 808s & Heartbreak was certified platinum by the Recording Industry Association of America (RIAA), serving as West's fourth album to ship one million copies in the United States. As of June 14, 2013, the album has sold 1.7 million copies in the US, according to Nielsen SoundScan; 1.63 million of these copies had apparently been sold by February 24, 2010. It was later certified quadruple platinum on July 17, 2026.

808s & Heartbreak attained a peak position of number four on the Canadian Albums Chart. On July 13, 2009, the album was certified platinum by Music Canada for selling 80,000 copies. 808s & Heartbreak peaked at number 11 on the UK Albums Chart and lasted for 29 weeks on the chart. The album was certified platinum by the British Phonographic Industry (BPI) for shipments of 300,000 copies on April 14, 2017. 808s & Heartbreak also reached number 11 on the Irish Albums Chart. In 2008, the album was certified platinum by the Irish Recorded Music Association (IRMA), indicating shipments of 15,000 copies. On the ARIA Albums Chart, 808s & Heartbreak peaked at number 12, standing as West's second lowest charting album in Australia. On December 31, 2008, the album was certified gold by the Australian Recording Industry Association (ARIA) for shipments of 35,000 copies.

Despite the polarizing response to 808s & Heartbreak, its singles performed successfully on record charts. Upon its release, the lead single "Love Lockdown" debuted at number three on the US Billboard Hot 100 and became a "Hot Shot Debut". It is the highest debut of West's career, the second highest debut on the Hot 100 that year and the 10th song of the millennium to debut in the top three. Grossing over 1.3 million copies at the iTunes Store alone, the single was certified platinum by the RIAA by the end of the year. On September 23, 2020, it was certified quadruple platinum by the RIAA, for shipments of 4,000,000 units in the US. The single was also met by positive reviews from music critics, eventually culminating with being crowned "Song of the Year" by Time. The second single, "Heartless" performed similarly and became West's second consecutive "Hot Shot Debut" by debuting at number four on the Billboard Hot 100. It was certified septuple platinum by the RIAA, having shipped 7,000,000 units in the US. Due in part to the momentum produced by the album's release, certain tracks were met by chart success despite not actually being released as singles during 2008. The 10th track "See You in My Nightmares" became yet another "Hot Shot Debut", peaking at number 21 in the US and number 22 in Canada, while the fourth track "Amazing" initially charted at number 81 on the Hot 100. Following suit, "Welcome to Heartbreak" peaked at number 87 on the US Pop 100. 808s & Heartbreak and its singles helped West top the year-end Billboard 2009 charts as both the top male Billboard 200 and Hot 100 artist.

== Critical reception ==
808s & Heartbreak ratings
Aggregate scores
Source	Rating
AnyDecentMusic?	7.3/10
Metacritic	75/100
Review scores
Source	Rating
AllMusic	3.5/5 stars
The A.V. Club	B
Entertainment Weekly	A−
The Guardian	4/5 stars
The Independent	3/5 stars
MSN Music (Consumer Guide)	A−
Pitchfork	7.6/10
Rolling Stone	3.5/5 stars
The Sunday Times	5/5 stars
USA Today	4/4 stars

According to the review aggregator Metacritic, 808s & Heartbreak received "generally favorable reviews" based on a weighted average score of 75 out of 100 from 36 critic scores. Aggregator AnyDecentMusic? gave 808s & Heartbreak 7.3 out of 10, based on their assessment of the critical consensus.

Reviewing in November 2008, Chris Richards from The Washington Post called the album "an information-age masterpiece", while USA Today critic Steve Jones said, "West deftly uses the 808 drum machine and Auto-Tune vocal effect to channel his feelings of hurt, anger and doubt through his well-crafted lyrics." Dan Cairns from The Sunday Times stated, "This so should not work ... Yet 808s & Heartbreak is a triumph, recklessly departing from the commercially copper-bottomed script and venturing far beyond West's comfort zone." Rolling Stone's Jody Rosen commended West's incorporation of the Roland TR-808 drum machine and described the album as "Kanye's would-be Here, My Dear or Blood on the Tracks, a mournful song-suite that swings violently between self-pity and self-loathing." He further wrote, "Kanye can't really sing in the classic sense, but he's not trying to. T-Pain taught the world that Auto-Tune doesn't just sharpen flat notes: It's a painterly device for enhancing vocal expressiveness and upping the pathos ... Kanye's digitized vocals are the sound of a man so stupefied by grief, he's become less than human." In the Chicago Tribune, Greg Kot called it West's "most radical yet" and said while West's fans may be disappointed, "this one is for him. It remains to be seen if he goes back to making records for everybody else. For now, this is one fascinatingly perverse detour." PopMatters critic Dave Heaton was impressed by West's "song and album construction, and with the way he captures a particular feeling through unusual, evocative, carefully crafted music that's both simple and complex, cold and warm, mechanical and human, melodic and harsh". Writing for MSN Music, Robert Christgau found it "brilliant" with a unique "dark sound" and "engaging tunes", despite a second-half drop-off, and praised West's use of Auto-Tune, which he felt "both undercuts his self-importance and adds physical reality to tales of alienated fame that might otherwise be pure pity parties".

Other reviewers were more critical. In the Chicago Sun-Times, Jim DeRogatis contended that, "If West had interspersed the more mechanical tracks with some that were the exact opposite—say, simple piano interludes provided by his old collaborators John Legend or Jon Brion—he might have made a masterpiece. Instead, he's merely given us an extremely intriguing, sporadically gripping, undeniably fearless and altogether unexpected piece of his troubled soul." Andy Gill of The Independent found West's "immersion in personal misery" uncomfortable and commented that the "stylistic tropes quickly become irritating". AllMusic editor Andy Kellman stated, "no matter its commendable fearlessness, the album is a listless, bleary trudge along West's permafrost." Charles Aaron from Spin criticized the songs' musical structures, calling the album "a long processional that starts and restarts and never reaches the ceremony". West's singing was panned by Slant Magazine's Wilson McBee and Jon Caramanica from The New York Times, who singled it out as the "weakness for which this album will ultimately be remembered, some solid songs notwithstanding". Caramanica added that, "at best, it is a rough sketch for a great album, with ideas he would have typically rendered with complexity, here distilled to a few words, a few synthesizer notes, a lean drumbeat. At worst, it's clumsy and underfed, a reminder that all of that ornamentation served a purpose."

=== Rankings ===
808s & Heartbreak was named one of the 10 best albums of 2008 by a number of publications, including the Hartford Courant (number seven), Now (number four), The Observer (number eight), Vibe (no order) and Time (number six). Pitchfork named 808s & Heartbreak the twenty-first best album of 2008. Dan Leroy of LA Weekly cited it as one of the top 10 hip-hop albums of the year. Jam! named it the top album of 2008. DeRogatis included the album on his list of the year's 10 best albums and wrote, "With every listen, the poignancy of these personal tales of loss grows deeper, perfectly matched by the cold, lonely, robotic but nevertheless winning grooves that accompany them. Upon further reflection, it is a brave and daring 4-star effort that deserves to be heard by any fan of adventurous pop music." Time Out New York featured the album on its list of the "Best and Worst Albums of 2008". The magazine's writer Colin St. John cited 808s & Heartbreak as one of the worst of 2008, and editor Steve Smith named it third on his best-of list, while calling the album "the year's most misunderstood triumph".

The album was placed at eighth on The Guardian's top 50 albums of 2008 list, stating; "He has always been more complex and unpredictable than his peers, but even by Kanye West's standards, 808s & Heartbreak was an unexpected curveball. Knocked completely sideways by the 'Shakespearean tragedy' of the death of his devoted mother following plastic surgery, and the split from his fiancée, West poured out his soul, showing glimpses of a hitherto unseen humility. In a complete departure from his preceding trilogy of albums, the rapper's fourth saw him barely rapping. Instead, half singing, half talking, his voice given a cracked, ethereal feel by hip-hop's gadget du jour, the Antares Auto-Tune, West laid himself bare, questioning the fame and materialism he had always coveted against a minimal backdrop of 808s and haunting strings. It's lonely at the top." BPM named it the eighth best album of the year.

In 2009, Rolling Stone ranked it number 63 on its list of the "100 Best Album of the Decade", then in 2014 they named it one of "The 40 Most Groundbreaking Albums of All Time", in which it was only one of two albums to be released in the 21st century. Q named it the decade's 81st best record. On similar lists, Slant Magazine and PopMatters ranked it 124th and 42nd, respectively. In 2020, Rolling Stone placed 808s & Heartbreak at number 244 on the magazine's revision to "The 500 Greatest Albums of All Time" list.

=== Industry awards ===
Despite the critical accolades, 808s & Heartbreak was largely overlooked by The Recording Academy as a contender for the 52nd Grammy Awards. According to Vibe magazine editor-in-chief Jermaine Hall, while West's controversial incident at the 2009 MTV Video Music Awards and the ensuing backlash "probably hurt him", the album's stylistic shift was the primary reason for it not being nominated. West received one solo nomination, Best Rap Performance by a Duo or Group for "Amazing", and five other nominations for his guest appearances and collaborative work. The album also contended for the following industry awards:

Awards and nominations for 808s & Heartbreak
Year	Organization	Award	Result	Ref.
2009	BET Hip Hop Awards	CD of the Year	Nominated	
2009	Hungarian Music Awards	Best Foreign Dance or Pop Album	Nominated	
2009	MOBO Awards	Best Album	Nominated	
2009	NAACP Image Awards	Outstanding Album	Nominated	
2009	Soul Train Music Awards	Album of the Year	Nominated	
2009	Swiss Music Awards	Best Album Urban International	Nominated	
2009	Teen Choice Awards	Choice Music: Album – Male	Nominated	
2009	Urban Music Awards USA	Best Album	Won	

== Legacy ==
808s was the first album of that kind, you know? It was the first, like, black new wave album. I didn't realize I was new wave until [Yeezus]. Thus my connection with Peter Saville, with Raf Simons, with high-end fashion, with minor chords. I hadn't heard new wave! But I am a black new wave artist.

— West (2013)

Although West conceived 808s & Heartbreak as a melancholic pop album, it proved to have a significant effect on hip-hop music. While his decision to sing about love, loneliness, and heartache for the entirety of the album was at first heavily criticized by music audiences and the album predicted to be a flop, its subsequent critical acclaim and commercial success encouraged other mainstream rappers to take greater creative risks with their music. During the marketing of The Blueprint 3, Jay-Z said that his next studio album would be an experimental effort, stating, "... it's not gonna be a #1 album. That's where I'm at right now. I wanna make the most experimental album I ever made." Jay-Z elaborated that like West, he was unsatisfied with contemporary hip-hop, was being inspired by indie-rockers like Grizzly Bear and asserted his belief that the indie rock movement would play an important role in the continued evolution of hip-hop. The album impacted hip-hop stylistically and laid the groundwork for a new wave of hip-hop artists who generally eschewed typical rap braggadocio for intimate subject matter and introspection, including B.o.B, Kid Cudi, Childish Gambino, Frank Ocean, and Drake.

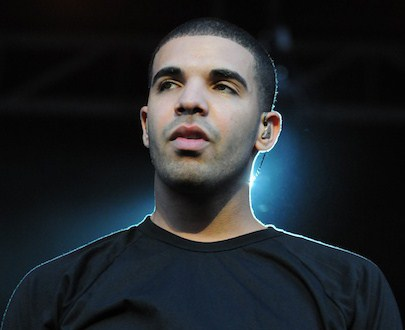
Drake (pictured in 2010) was part of the wave of rappers influenced by the album.

While not considered among West's best, 808s & Heartbreak is arguably his most influential album, according to Complex. In 2011, Jake Paine of HipHopDX dubbed the album as "our Chronic," noting West's effect on hip-hop with 808s & Heartbreak as "a sound, no different than the way Dr. Dre's synthesizer challenged the boom-bap of the early '90s." Fact described the record as an "art-pop masterpiece [which] broke the shackles of generations of one-upmanship [in hip-hop]." In Rolling Stone, journalist Matthew Trammell asserted that the record was ahead of its time and wrote in a 2012 article, "Now that popular music has finally caught up to it, 808s & Heartbreak has revealed itself to be Kanye's most vulnerable work, and perhaps his most brilliant." Drake's 2009 mixtape So Far Gone received comparisons from critics to 808s & Heartbreak. Todd Martens of the Los Angeles Times cited 808s & Heartbreak as "the template [...] for essentially the entirety of Drake's young career," and that he "shares West's love for mood and never-ending existential analysis." In a 2009 interview, Drake cited West as "the most influential person" in shaping his own sound. Similarly to So Far Gone, Drake's 2010 debut album Thank Me Later was compared to 808s & Heartbreak by critics.

808s & Heartbreak is credited with giving rise to the emo rap subgenre. According to Greg Kot, 808s & Heartbreak initiated the "wave of inward-looking sensitivity" and "emo"-inspired rappers during the late 2000s: "[It] presaged everything from the introspective hip-hop of Kid Cudi's Man on the Moon: The End of Day (2009) to the wispy crooning, plush keyboards and light mechanical beats of Bon Iver's Justin Vernon and British dub-step balladeer James Blake." For Pitchfork, Jayson Greene wrote: "The only thing more influential than the album's sound might be its tone: bitter, confused, self-pitying, defensive, and accusatory." Consequence credited it with shaping subsequent developments in "indie R&B or electropop or whatever you want to call it": "808s' is flooded with R&B and it digitizes the raw emotion and isolated feelings that [James Blake and the Weeknd] have carved their brands out of today." Craig D. Linsey from The Village Voice wrote that the album's "naked humanity ... practically set off the emo-rap/r&b boom that everyone from Drake to Frank Ocean to The Weeknd now traffic in." Marcus Scott of Giant said rappers such as B.o.B, Drake, and Kid Cudi followed West's album with similarly minded works, citing West's introspective, emotional themes and synthpop/"Vangelis-inspired" music as influences. Billboard writer Michael Saponara credits its influence on the late-2010s music of Juice Wrld, who himself admitted, "I was singing 'Street Lights' like I had shit to be sad about. Kanye is a time traveler. ... went to damn near 2015 and came back with some sauce." Lil Uzi Vert, another emo rapper, said that the album changed his life. The Pet Shop Boys hired 808s & Heartbreak recorder and mixer Andrew Dawson to produce their album Elysium (2012), based on their admiration for the "luxurious" sound of West's album.

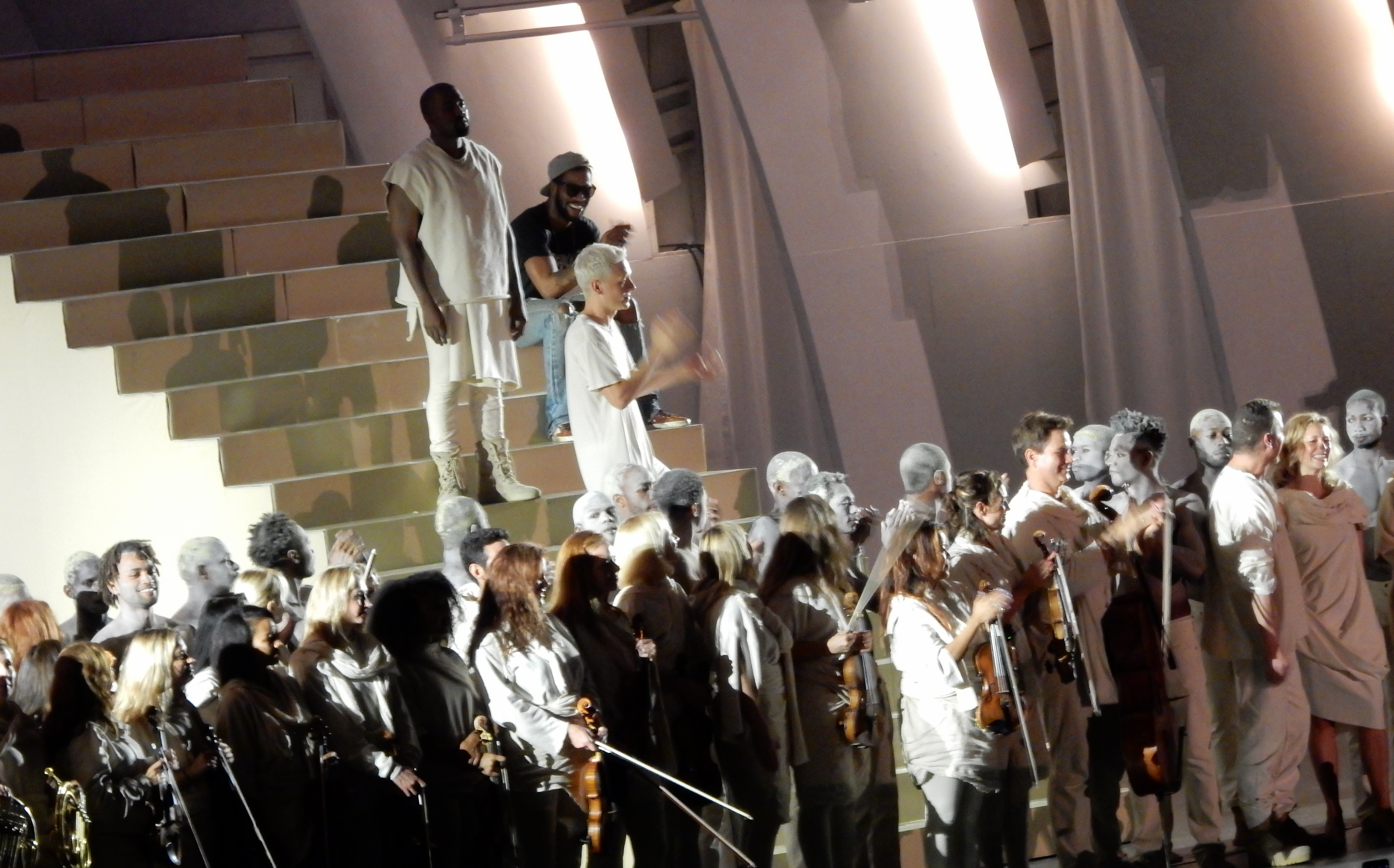
West, Kid Cudi, and Mr Hudson behind an array of other performers onstage for the album's reproduction at the Hollywood Bowl, September 2015

In the opinion of Billboard senior editor Alex Gale in 2016, the album was "the equivalent of (Bob) Dylan going electric, and you still hear that all the time, in hip-hop and outside of hip-hop." In 2014, Rolling Stone named the album as one of the 40 most groundbreaking albums of all time, noting that it "served as a new template for up-and-comers in hip-hop and R&B." Speaking with Pitchfork's Ryan Dombal that year, Tom Krell said his music project How to Dress Well "would not be possible" without West's album, which Dombal described as an "emo&B opus". On the album's 10th anniversary in 2018, The Boombox writer Bobby Olivier found its continued influence evident in the works of Post Malone and Travis Scott, as well as the commercial dominance of hip-hop in the US in general, although he said it remains West's least valued album. Olivier contended that, by "morph[ing] his shattered soul into a piece of wondrous millennial art-pop", West had "played anti-hero to his acclaimed collegiate trilogy" and begun "the demolition between rap, pop and EDM genre lines in earnest", drawing "a blueprint for hip-hop in the 2010s, where minimalism and melancholy could prove just as propulsive as boom-bap and classic gangster bravado, and where oft-maligned auto-tune could weaponize a voice and reshape it as a compelling new instrument". In a March 2024 interview, West credited "the autotune album" as having invented a style of music used by the likes of the Weeknd, Travis Scott and Drake, as well as rappers Future and Young Thug. Lil Boosie reacted to West's statement via Instagram Stories by writing that West is not influential nor relatable to him, while Kid Cudi responded by posting a screenshot of the Wikipedia page showing his influence on 808s & Heartbreak.

On September 25 and 26, 2015, West performed a re-arranged version of the album in its entirety at the Hollywood Bowl in Los Angeles. The performance involved numerous collaborators, including vocal ensemble Roomful of Teeth, orchestral performers, more than sixty dancers, rappers Kid Cudi and Young Jeezy, as well as actress Zoë Kravitz. On October 20, 2015, West released a studio version of "Say You Will" featuring vocals by American composer and violinist Caroline Shaw, from Roomful of Teeth, onto his SoundCloud account, similar to the version performed at the Hollywood Bowl.

== Track listing ==
Information is largely taken from the album's liner notes; songwriting credits for track 12 are from BMI.

808s & Heartbreak track listing
No.	Title	Writer(s)	Producer(s)	Length
1.	"Say You Will"	Kanye West; Jeff Bhasker; Jay Jenkins; Malik Jones; Benjamin McIldowie; Dexter Mills	West	6:17
2.	"Welcome to Heartbreak" (featuring Kid Cudi)	West; Bhasker; Patrick Reynolds; Scott Mescudi	West; Bhasker^{[a]}; Plain Pat^{[a]}	4:22
3.	"Heartless"	West; Ernest Wilson; Mescudi; Jones	West; No I.D.^{[a]}	3:30
4.	"Amazing" (featuring Young Jeezy)	West; Jones; Mills; Bhasker; Jenkins	West; Bhasker^{[a]}	3:58
5.	"Love Lockdown"	West; Bhasker; Jenny-Bea Englishman; Jones; LaNeah Menzies	West; Bhasker^{[a]}	4:30
6.	"Paranoid" (featuring Mr Hudson)	West; Reynolds; Mescudi; Mills; Bhasker	West; Bhasker^{[a]}; Plain Pat^{[a]}	4:37
7.	"RoboCop"	West; Englishman; Jones; Mills; Mescudi; Anthony Williams; Bhasker; Faheem Najm; Jenkins; Patrick Doyle	West	4:34
8.	"Street Lights"	West; Englishman; Williams; McIldowie	West; Mr Hudson^{[a]}	3:09
9.	"Bad News"	West; George Bass	West	3:58
10.	"See You in My Nightmares" (featuring Lil Wayne)	West; Wilson; Bhasker; Dwayne Carter	West; No I.D.^{[a]}	4:18
11.	"Coldest Winter"	West; Wilson; Roland Orzabal	West; No I.D.^{[a]}; Bhasker^{[a]}	2:44
12.	"Pinocchio Story (Freestyle Live from Singapore)" (hidden track)	West	West	6:01
Total length:				51:58

Notes

- ^{^[a]} signifies a co-producer
- "Welcome to Heartbreak" contains background vocals by Jeff Bhasker
- "Amazing" contains background vocals by Mr Hudson and Tony Williams
- "Paranoid" contains background vocals by Kid Cudi
- "RoboCop" contains background vocals by Tony Williams and Jeff Bhasker
- "Street Lights" contains background vocals by Esthero and Tony Williams

Sample credits

- "RoboCop" embodies portions of "Kissing in the Rain", written by Patrick Doyle.
- "Bad News" contains a sample of the recording "See Line Woman" as performed by Nina Simone and written by George Bass.
- "Coldest Winter" embodies an interpolation of "Memories Fade", written by Roland Orzabal.

== Personnel ==
Musicians

- Lula Almeida – drums/percussions (track 5)
- Davis Barnett – viola (tracks 1, 2, 7, 9, 10)
- Jeff Bhasker – keyboards (all tracks), background vocals (tracks 2, 7)
- James J. Cooper III – cello (tracks 1, 2, 7, 9, 10)
- Rodney Dassis – drums/percussions (track 5)
- Miles Davis – bass (tracks 1, 2, 7, 9, 10)
- Esthero – background vocals (track 8)
- Larry Gold – string arrangement and conducting (tracks 1, 2, 7, 9, 10)
- Mr Hudson – featured artist (track 6), background vocals (tracks 1, 4)
- The Kadockadee Kwire featuring Glenn Jordan, Phillip Ingram, Jim Gilstrap, Romeo Johnson, Kevin Dorsey and Will Wheaton – vocals (track 1)
- Kid Cudi – featured artist (track 2), background vocals (track 6)
- Olga Konopelsky – violin (tracks 1, 2, 7, 9, 10)
- Emma Kummrow – violin (tracks 1, 2, 7, 9, 10)
- Alexandra Leem – viola (tracks 1, 2, 7, 9, 10)
- Ken Lewis – piano (tracks 2, 3), orchestra in chorus (track 7)
- Lil Wayne – featured artist (track 10)
- Jennie Lorenzo – cello (tracks 1, 2, 7, 9, 10)
- Luigi Mazzochi – violin (tracks 1, 2, 7, 9, 10)
- Charles Parker – violin (tracks 1, 2, 7, 9, 10)
- Igor Szwec – violin (tracks 1, 2, 7, 9, 10)
- Gregory Teperman – violin (tracks 1, 2, 7, 9, 10)
- Kanye West – lead artist
- Tony Williams – background vocals (tracks 1, 4, 7, 8)
- Young Jeezy – featured artist (track 4)
- Gibi Zé Bruno – drums/percussions (track 5)

Production

- Jeff Bhasker – co-production (tracks 2, 4–6, 10)
- Chad Carlisle – recording assistance (tracks 1–4, 6–11)
- Jeff Chestek – string engineering (tracks 1, 2, 7, 9, 10)
- Andrew Dawson – recording (all tracks), mixing (track 5)
- Isha Erskine – recording assistance (tracks 1–4, 6–11)
- Rick Friedrich – string engineering assistance (tracks 1, 2, 7, 9, 10)
- Gaylord Holomalia – recording assistance (tracks 1–4, 6–11)
- Mr Hudson – co-production (track 8)
- Anthony Kilhoffer – recording (tracks 1–4, 6–11)
- Brent Kolatalo – orchestra in chorus engineering (track 7)
- Ken Lewis – orchestra in chorus engineering (track 7)
- Erik Madrid – mix assistance (tracks 1–4, 6–11)
- Vlado Meller – mastering
- Montez Roberts – string engineering assistance (tracks 1, 2, 7, 9, 10)
- Manny Marroquin – mixing (tracks 1–4, 6–11)
- Christian Mochizuki – recording assistance (tracks 1–4, 6–11)
- No I.D. – co-production (tracks 3, 10, 11)
- Plain Pat – co-production (tracks 2, 6)
- Christian Plata – mix assistance (tracks 1–4, 6–11)
- John Stahl – string engineering assistance (tracks 1, 2, 7, 9, 10)
- Kanye West – production (all tracks)

== Charts ==
=== Weekly charts ===
Weekly chart performance
Chart (2008)	Peak position
Australian Albums (ARIA)	12
Austrian Albums (Ö3 Austria)	50
Belgian Albums (Ultratop Flanders)	21
Belgian Albums (Ultratop Wallonia)	69
Canadian Albums (Billboard)	4
Dutch Albums (Album Top 100)	42
French Albums (SNEP)	52
German Albums (Offizielle Top 100)	30
Greek Albums (IFPI)	16
Irish Albums (IRMA)	11
Italian Albums (FIMI)	65
Japanese Albums (Oricon)	25
New Zealand Albums (RMNZ)	15
Norwegian Albums (VG-lista)	19
Russian Albums (Tophit)	18
Scottish Albums (Official Charts)	16
Swiss Albums (Schweizer Hitparade)	13
UK Albums (Official Charts)	11
UK R&B Albums (Official Charts)	3
US Billboard 200	1
US Top R&B/Hip-Hop Albums (Billboard)	1

Weekly chart performance
Chart (2014)	Peak position
US Vinyl Albums (Billboard)	14

Weekly chart performance
Chart (2024)	Peak position
Portuguese Albums (AFP)	81

Weekly chart performance
Chart (2026)	Peak position
Croatian International Albums (HDU)	36

=== Year-end charts ===
Year-end chart performance
Chart (2008)	Position
Australia Urban Albums (ARIA)	16
UK Albums (OCC)	131
Worldwide Charts (IFPI)	31

Year-end chart performance
Chart (2009)	Position
Australia Urban Albums (ARIA)	15
Canadian Albums (Billboard)	22
UK Albums (OCC)	125
US Billboard 200	7
US Top R&B/Hip-Hop Albums (Billboard)	5

== Certifications ==
Certifications and sales
Region	Certification	Certified units/sales
Australia (ARIA)	Gold	35,000^{^}
Canada (Music Canada)	Platinum	80,000^{^}
Denmark (IFPI Danmark)	Platinum	20,000^{‡}
Ireland (IRMA)	Platinum	15,000^{^}
New Zealand (RMNZ)	Platinum	15,000^{‡}
United Kingdom (BPI)	Platinum	300,000^{‡}
United States (RIAA)	4× Platinum	3,000,000
^{^} Shipments figures based on certification alone.^{‡} Sales+streaming figures based on certification alone.

== See also ==
- List of Billboard 200 number-one albums of 2008
- List of Billboard number-one R&B albums of 2008

== Bibliography ==
- Kanye West (2008). 808s & Heartbreak. (iTunes digital booklet). The Island Def Jam Music Group, 825 Eighth Ave., NY, NY 10019.
