= List of songs recorded by Kanye West =

Recordings by American rapper

- Category: Songs
Released songs	601
Unreleased songs	32
Total	633

This is a list of songs recorded by Kanye West, an American rapper, record producer, and songwriter. The list includes over 600 released songs on which West appears as a main artist or featured artist, as well as a selection of notable unreleased recordings. Songs are organized alphabetically and cover West's discography from his early work in the 2000s through his releases in the 2020s, including collaborations released under group names such as Kids See Ghosts and ¥$.

== Released songs ==
=== As main artist ===
Name of song, featured performers, writer(s), original release, and year of release
Song	Artist(s)	Writer(s)	Original release	Year	Ref.	Key of Songs
"24"	Kanye West	Warryn Campbell Dexter Mills; Mark Williams; Brian "AllDay" Miller; Albert Daniels; Malik Yusef; Cory Henry; Mark Mbogo; Raul Cubina; Kanye West	Donda	2021		
"30 Hours"	Kanye West	Kanye West; Aubrey Graham; Karriem Riggins; Mike Dean; Charles Arthur Russell; Cornell Haynes; Jason Epperson; Pharrell Williams; Charles Brown	The Life of Pablo	2016		
"40 Nights"	The Game and Kanye West	The Game Kanye West; Dominique Sanders Hassan Khafaff Jason Martin Skeez	The Documentary III	2026		
"4th Dimension"	Kids See Ghosts featuring Louis Prima	Kanye West; Scott Mescudi; Mike Dean; Louis Prima	Kids See Ghosts	2018		
"Addiction"	Kanye West	Kanye West; Richard Rodgers; Lorenz Hart	Late Registration	2005		
"All Day"	Kanye West featuring Theophilus London, Allan Kingdom, and Paul McCartney	Kanye West; Paul McCartney; Tyler Branch; Kendrick Duckworth; Karim Kharbouch; Ernest Brown; Cydel Young; Victor Mensah; Allan Kyariga; Mike Dean; Che Pope; Noah Goldstein; Allen Ritter; Mario Winans; Charles Njapa; Malik Yusef Jones; Patrick Reynolds; Rennard East; Noel Ellis	So Help Me God	2015		
"All Falls Down"	Kanye West featuring Syleena Johnson	Kanye West; Lauryn Hill	The College Dropout	2004		
"All Mine"	Kanye West	Kanye West; Mike Dean; Francis Starlite; Cydel Young; Dexter Mills; Malik Yusef; Jeremih Felton; Danielle Balbuena; Anthony Clemons; Uforo Ebong; Tyrone Griffin, Jr. Kenneth Pershon; Terrance Boykin; Jordan Thorpe	Ye	2018		
"All of the Lights" (Interlude)	Kanye West	Kanye West; Jeff Bhasker	My Beautiful Dark Twisted Fantasy	2010		
"All of the Lights"	Kanye West featuring Rihanna	Kanye West; Jeff Bhasker; Malik Jones; Warren Trotter	My Beautiful Dark Twisted Fantasy	2010		
"Amazing"	Kanye West featuring Young Jeezy	Kanye West; Malik Jones; Dexter Mills; Jeff Bhasker; Jay Jenkins	808s & Heartbreak	2008		Cm
"Back To Basics"	Kanye West featuring Common	Kanye West; Lonnie Lynn	Late Registration	2005		
"Bad News"	Kanye West	Kanye West; George Bass	808s & Heartbreak	2008		
"Barry Bonds"	Kanye West featuring Lil Wayne	Kanye West; Dwayne Carter, Jr. Norman Landsberg; Felix Pappalardi; John Ventura; Leslie Weinstein	Graduation	2007		
"Believe What I Say"	Kanye West	Lauryn Hill; Kanye West; Mark Myrie; Cydel Young; Isaac de Boni; Jahmal Gwin; Adam Wright; Malik Yusef; Michael Mule; Billy Walsh; Anthony Reid; Raul Cubina; Cristi Gallo	Donda	2021		
"Big Brother"	Kanye West	Kanye WestAldrin Davis	Graduation	2007		
"Bittersweet Poetry"	Kanye West featuring John Mayer	Kanye West; John Mayer	Graduation (Japanese edition)	2007		
"Black Skinhead"	Kanye West	Kanye West; Guy-Manuel de Homem-Christo; Thomas Bangalter; Malik Jones; Cydel Young; Elon Rutberg; Wasalu Muhammad Jaco; Sakiya Sandifer; Mike Dean; Derrick Watkins	Yeezus	2013		
"Blame Game"	Kanye West featuring John Legend	Kanye West; Justin Franks; Khloe Mitchell; Mike Dean; John Stephens; Richard James	My Beautiful Dark Twisted Fantasy	2010		
"Blood on the Leaves"	Kanye West	Kanye West; Ross Bichard; Elon Rutberg; Malik Jones; Decker; Tony Williams; Cydel Young; Mike Dean; Lewis Allen	Yeezus	2013		
"Bound 2"	Kanye West	Kanye West; John Stephens; Charlie Wilson; Che Pope; Elon Rutberg; Cydel Young; Malik Jones; Sakiya Sadifer; Mike Dean; Norman Whiteside; Bob Massey; Robert Dukes; Ronnie Self	Yeezus	2013		
"Breathe In Breathe Out"	Kanye West featuring Ludacris	Kanye West; Brian Miller	The College Dropout	2004		
"Bring Me Down"	Kanye West featuring Brandy	Kanye West; Brandy Norwood; Andre Williams	Late Registration	2005		
"Can't Tell Me Nothing"	Kanye West	Kanye West	Graduation	2007		Cm
"Can't Tell Me Nothing (Remix)"	Kanye West featuring Jeezy	Kanye West; Jeezy	Graduation	2007		
"Celebration"	Kanye West	Kanye West	Late Registration	2005		
"Chain Heavy"	Kanye West featuring Talib Kweli and Consequence		GOOD Fridays	2010		
"Champion"	Kanye West	Kanye West; Walter Becker; Donald Fagen	Graduation	2007		Am
"Champions"	Dame Dash, Kanye West, Beanie Sigel, Cam'ron, Young Chris and Twista		Paid in Full/Dream Team	2002		
"Champions"	Kanye West, Gucci Mane, Big Sean, 2 Chainz, Travis Scott, Yo Gotti, Quavo and Desiigner	Kanye West; Alain Macklovitch; Lexus Lewis; Mike Dean; Noah Goldstein; Radric Davis; Sean Anderson; Tauheed Epps; Jacques Webster; Mario Mims; Quavious Marshall; Sidney Selby III; Derek Watkins	Cruel Winter	2016		
"Christian Dior Denim Flow"	Kanye West featuring Pusha T, Ryan Leslie, Lloyd Banks, Kid Cudi and John Legend	Kanye West; Terrence Thornton	GOOD Fridays	2010		
"Christmas In Harlem"	Kanye West featuring Vado, Jim Jones, Cyhi the Prynce, Pusha T, Big Sean, Cam'ron, Teyana Taylor and Musiq Soulchild		GOOD Fridays	2010		
"Classic (Better Than I've Ever Been)"	Kanye West	Kanye West; Nasir Jones; William Griffin; Lawrence Parker; Biddu Appaiah; Carl Douglas	Non-album single	2007		
"Clique"	Kanye West, Jay-Z, and Big Sean	Chauncey Hollis; Sean Anderson; Kanye West; Alexander Izquierdo; Shawn Carter; James Fauntleroy II	Cruel Summer	2012		
"Closed on Sunday"	Kanye West	Kanye West; Angel Lopez; Brian Miller; Chango Farías Goméz; Federico Vindver; Gene Thornton; Rennard East; Terrence Thornton; Timothy Mosley; Victory Elyse Boyd	Jesus Is King	2019		
"Cold"	Kanye West featuring DJ Khaled	Kanye West; Chauncey Hollis; Marlon Williams; James Smith	Cruel Summer	2012		
"Coldest Winter"	Kanye West	Kanye West; Ernest Wilson; Roland Orzabal	808s & Heartbreak	2008		
"Come to Life"	Kanye West	Tyler Okonma Warryn Campbell Raul Cubina Mark Williams Jeff Bhasker Kanye West	Donda	2021		
"Crack Music"	Kanye West featuring the Game	Kanye West; Jayceon Taylor; Willard Meeks	Late Registration	2005		
"Cudi Montage"	Kids See Ghosts	Kanye West; Scott Mescudi; Mike Dean; Kurt Cobain	Kids See Ghosts	2018		
"Dark Fantasy"	Kanye West	Kanye West; Robert Diggs; Ernest Wilson; Jeff Bhasker; Mike Dean; Mike Jones; Jon Anderson; Mike Oldfield	My Beautiful Dark Twisted Fantasy	2010		F
"Devil in a New Dress"	Kanye West featuring Rick Ross	Kanye West; Roosevelt Harrell; Mike Dean; William Roberts II; Malik Jones; Carole King; Gerry Goffin	My Beautiful Dark Twisted Fantasy	2010		E
"Diamonds from Sierra Leone"	Kanye West	Kanye West; Devon Harris; Don Black; John Barry	Late Registration	2005		Bm
"Diamonds from Sierra Leone" (Remix)	Kanye West featuring Jay-Z	Kanye West; Shawn Carter; Devon Harris; Don Black; John Barry	Late Registration	2005		Bm
"Don't Like. 1"	Kanye West, Chief Keef, Pusha T, Big Sean and Jadakiss	Kanye West; Keith Cozart; Terrence Thornton; Sean Anderson; Jason Phillips; Tyree Pittman; Townsend; Barrington Levy; Paul Love	Cruel Summer	2012		
"Don't Look Down"	Kanye West featuring Lupe Fiasco, Big Sean and Mos Def		GOOD Fridays	2010		
"Donda Chant"	Kanye West	Kanye West Syleena Johnson Malik Yusef	Donda	2021		
"Drive Slow"	Kanye West featuring Paul Wall and GLC	Kanye West; Paul Slayton; Leonard Harris	Late Registration and The Peoples Champ	2005		
"Drunk and Hot Girls"	Kanye West featuring Mos Def	Kanye West; Michael Karoli; Jaki Liebezeit; Irmin Schmidt; Holger Schuering; Kenji Suzuki	Graduation	2007		
"Every Hour"	Kanye West featuring Sunday Service Choir	Kanye West; Benjamin Scholefield; Federico Vindver	Jesus Is King	2019		
"Everything I Am"	Kanye West featuring DJ Premier	Kanye West; George Clinton, Jr. Prince Phillip Mitchell; Carlton Ridenhour; Eric Sadler; Hank Shocklee	Graduation	2007		
"Everything We Need"	Kanye West featuring Ty Dolla Sign and Ant Clemons	Kanye West; Anthony Clemons; Bradford Lewis; Cydel Young; Federico Vindver; Isaac DeBoni; Jahmal Gwin; Michael Mulé; Mike Dean; Ronald Spence Jr. Tyrone William Griffin Jr. Josh Berg; Bradford Eugene Lewis; Gerard A. Powell	Jesus Is King	2019		
"Facts"	Kanye West	Kanye West; Cydel Young; Noah Goldstein; Joshua Luellen; Nicholas Smith; Aubrey Graham; Leland Wayne; Nayvadius Wilburn	—N/a	2015		
"Facts" (Charlie Heat Version)	Kanye West	Kanye West; Cydel Young; Ernest Brown; Noah Goldstein; Joshua Luellen; Nicholas Smith; Aubrey Graham; Leland Wayne; Nayvadius Wilburn	The Life of Pablo	2016		
"Fade"	Kanye West	Kanye West; Tyrone Griffin, Jr. Austin Post; Anthony Kilhoffer; Mike Dean; Ryan Vojtesak; Noah Goldstein; Benjamin Benstead; Jerome Potter; Samuel Griesemer; Norman Whitfield; Eddie Holland; Cornelius Grant; Larry Heard; Robert Owens; Louie Vega; Ronald Carroll; Barbara Tucker; Harold Matthews	The Life of Pablo	2016		
"Family Business"	Kanye West	Kanye West	The College Dropout	2004		F
"Famous"	Kanye West	Kanye West; Cydel Young; Kejuan Muchita; Noah Goldstein; Andrew Dawson; Mike Dean; Chancellor Bennett; Kasseem Dean; Ernest Brown; Ross Birchard; Pat Reynolds; Jimmy Webb; Winston Riley; Luis Enriquez Bacalov; Enzo Vita; Sergio Bardotti; Giampiero Scalamogna	The Life of Pablo	2016		
"Father Stretch My Hands Pt. 1"	Kanye West	Kanye West; Scott Mescudi; Rick Rubin; Mike Dean; Noah Goldstein; Leland Wayne; Cydel Young; Allen Ritter; Jerome Potter; Samuel Griesemer; Chancellor Bennett; T.L. Barrett	The Life of Pablo	2016		
"Feedback"	Kanye West	Kanye West; Ernest Brown; Noah Goldstein; Cydel Young; Darius Jenkins; Rachel Mills; Marcus Byrd; Chancellor Bennett; Ardalan Sarfaraz; Farid Zaland}	The Life of Pablo	2016		
"Feel the Love"	Kids See Ghosts featuring Pusha T	Kanye West; Scott Mescudi; Mike Dean; Evan Mast; Benjamin Lavin; Terrance Thornton	Kids See Ghosts	2018		
"Fire"	Kids See Ghosts featuring Pusha T	Kanye West; Scott Mescudi; Evan Mast; André Benjamin	Kids See Ghosts	2018		
"Flashing Lights"	Kanye West featuring Dwele	Kanye West; Eric Hudson	Graduation	2007		
"FML"	Kanye West	Kanye West; Abel Tesfaye; Cydel Young; Mike Dean; Andrew Dawson; Noah Goldstein; Leland Wayne; Ernest Brown; Christian Boggs; Darius Jenkins; Rachel Mills; Marcus Byrd; Ross Birchard; Jacques Webster; Lawrence Cassidy; Vincent Cassidy; Paul Wiggin	The Life of Pablo	2016		
"Follow God"	Kanye West	Kanye West; Aaron Butts; Bryant Bell; Calvin Eubanks; Curtis Eubanks; Jahmal Gwin	Jesus Is King	2019		
"FourFiveSeconds"	Rihanna, Kanye West, and Paul McCartney	Kanye West; Paul McCartney; Kirby Lauryen; Mike Dean; Tyrone Griffin, Jr. Dave Longstreth; Dallas Austin; Elon Rutberg; Noah Goldstein	So Help Me God	2015		
"Frank's Track"	Kanye West	Kanye West; Christopher Breaux; Magnus August Høiberg; Alan Stanley Soucy Brinsmead	The Life of Pablo	2016		
"Freeee (Ghost Town, Pt. 2)"	Kids See Ghosts featuring Ty Dolla Sign	Kanye West; Scott Mescudi; Mike Dean; Tyrone Griffin, Jr. Jeff Bhasker; Corin Littler	Kids See Ghosts	2018		
"Freestyle 4"	Kanye West	Kanye West; Mike Dean; Cydel Young; Sidney Selby III; Ross Birchard; Jerome Potter; Samuel Griesemer; Noah Goldstein; Caroline Shaw; Trevor Gureckis; Alison Goldfrapp; William Gregory; Robert Locke; Timothy Norfolk	The Life of Pablo	2016		
"Gemini Season"	Kanye West	Kanye West	Non-album single	2026		
"Get 'Em High"	Kanye West featuring Talib Kweli and Common	Kanye West; Talib Kweli Greene; Lonnie Lynn	The College Dropout	2004		
"Ghost Town"	Kanye West featuring PartyNextDoor	Kanye West; Mike Dean; Trade Martin; Shirley Ann Lee; Jahron Braithwaite; Francis Starlite; Cydel Young; Dexter Mills; Carole Bayer Sager; Malik Yusef; Danielle Balbuena; Noah Goldstein; Helen Jayne Culver; Kenneth Pershon; Terrance Boykin; Jordan Thorpe	Ye	2018		
"The Glory"	Kanye West	Kanye West; Norman Landsberg; Laura Nyro; Felix Pappalardi; Dante Smith; John Ventura; Leslie Weinstein	Graduation	2007		
"God Breathed"	Kanye West	Dennis Young; Salvatore Principato; Scott Hartley; Richard Fearless; Federico Vindver Fya Man; Aaron ButtsBrian Miller; E*vax; Mark Williams; Raul Cubina; Vory; Kanye West	Donda	2021		
"God Is"	Kanye West	Kanye West; Angel Lopez; Federico Vindver; Robert Fryson; Timothy Lee McKenzie; Victory Elyse Boyd; Warryn Campbell	Jesus Is King	2019		
"Gold Digger"	Kanye West featuring Jamie Foxx	Kanye West; Eric Bishop; Renald Richard; Ray Charles	Late Registration	2005		
"Gone"	Kanye West featuring Cam'ron and Consequence	Kanye West; Cameron Giles; Dexter Mills; Chuck Willis	Late Registration	2005		
"Good Friday"	Kanye West featuring Common, Pusha T, Big Sean, Kid Cudi and Charlie Wilson		GOOD Fridays	2010		
"Good Life"	Kanye West featuring T-Pain	Kanye West; Faheem Najm; James Ingram; Quincy Jones; John Stephens	Graduation	2007		
"Good Morning"	Kanye West	Kanye West; Elton John; Bernie Taupin	Graduation	2007		
"Good Night"	Kanye West featuring Al Be Back and Mos Def	Kanye West; Albert Daniels; Dante Smith	Graduation (iTunes, UK and Japanese editions)	2007		
"Gorgeous"	Kanye West featuring Kid Cudi and Raekwon	Kanye West; Ernest Wilson; Mike Dean; Malik Jones; Che Smith; Corey Woods; Scott Mescudi; Gene Clark; Roger McGuinn	My Beautiful Dark Twisted Fantasy	2010		
"Gotta Have It"	Jay-Z & Kanye West	Kanye West; Shawn Carter; Pharrell Williams; James Brown; Joseph Roach; Tony Pinckney; Fred Wesley	Watch the Throne	2011		
"Graduation Day"	Kanye West	Kanye West	The College Dropout	2004		
"Guilt Trip"	Kanye West	Kanye West; Scott Mescudi; Cydel Young; Mike Dean; Larry Griffin, Jr. Keith Elam; Kevin Hansford; Dupre Kelly; Chris Martin; Al-Terik Wardrick; Marlon Williams; Terrence Thornton; Tyree Pittman	Yeezus	2013		
"H•A•M"	Jay-Z & Kanye West	Kanye West; Shawn Carter; Lexus Lewis; Mike Dean	Watch the Throne (Deluxe edition)	2011		
"Hands On"	Kanye West featuring Fred Hammond	Kanye West; Aaron Butts; Angel Lopez; Federico Vindver; Fred Hammond; Timothy Mosley	Jesus Is King	2019		
"Heard 'Em Say"	Kanye West featuring Adam Levine	Kanye West; Gerry Goffin; Michael Masser; Adam Levine	Late Registration	2005		F
"Heavy Hitters"	Kanye West featuring GLC	Kanye West; Leonard Harris	The College Dropout	2005		
"Heartless"	Kanye West	Kanye West; Ernest Wilson; Scott Mescudi; Malik Jones	808s & Heartbreak	2008		Bbm
"Heaven and Hell"	Kanye West	Tobias Smith Kanye West	Donda	2021		
"Hell of a Life"	Kanye West	Kanye West; Mike Caren; Ernest Wilson; Mike Dean; Sylvester Stewart; Tony Joe White; Terence Butler; Anthony Iommi; John Osbourne; William Ward	My Beautiful Dark Twisted Fantasy	2010		
"Hey Mama"	Kanye West	Kanye West; Donal Leace	Late Registration	2005		
"Highlights"	Kanye West	Kanye West; Terius Nash; Noah Goldstein; Joshua Luellen; Cydel Young; Jeffrey Williams; Mike Dean; Greg Phillinganes; Tyler Bryant; Pat Reynolds	The Life of Pablo	2016		
"Hold My Liquor"	Kanye West	Kanye West; Mike Dean; Justin Vernon; Keith Cozart; Elon Rutberg; Che Smith; Malik Jones; Alejandro Ghersi; Cydel Young; Derrick Watkins	Yeezus	2013		Cm
"Homecoming"	Kanye West featuring Chris Martin	Kanye West; Warryn Campbell; Chris Martin	Graduation	2007		
"Hurricane"	Kanye West (album version) Kanye West & The Weeknd featuring Lil Baby (single version)	Abel Tesfaye; Charles Njapa; Christopher Ruelas; Daniel Seeff; Dominique Jones; Henry Walter; Jahmal Gwin; Joshua Mease; Kanye West; Khalil Abdul-Rahman; Mark Williams; Mark Mbogo; Michael Dean; Raul Cubina; Ronald Spence; Sam Barsh	Donda	2021		
"I Am a God"	Kanye West	Kanye West; Guy-Manuel de Homem-Christo; Thomas Bangalter; Ross Birchard; Justin Vernon; Malik Jones; Che Smith; Elon Rutberg; Cydel Young; Mike Dean; Derrick Watkins; Clifton Bailey; Harvel Hart; Anand Bakshi; Rahul Burman	Yeezus	2013		
"I Love It"	Kanye West & Lil Pump	Kanye West; Gazzy Garcia; Omar Pineiro	Non-album single	2018		
"I Love Kanye"	Kanye West	Kanye West	The Life of Pablo	2016		
"I Thought About Killing You"	Kanye West	Kanye West; Mike Dean; Francis Starlite; Benjamin Levin; Cydel Young; Dexter Mills; Malik Yusef; Richard Cowie; Joseph Adenuga Olaitan; Kenneth Pershon; Terrance Boykin	Ye	2018		
"I Wonder"	Kanye West	Kanye West; Labi Siffre	Graduation	2007		
"I'll Fly Away"	Kanye West	Albert E. Brumley	The College Dropout	2004		
"I'm In It"	Kanye West	Kanye West; Justin Vernon; Jeffrey Ethan Campbell; Josh Leary; Malik Jones; Cydel Young; Sakiya Sandifer; Elon Rutberg; Mike Dean; Andre Harris; Jill Scott; Vidal Davis; Carvin Haggins; Kenny Lattimore	Yeezus	2013		
"Illest Motherfucker Alive"	Jay-Z & Kanye West	Kanye West; Shawn Carter; Mike Dean; Joshua Luellen; Scott Mescudi	Watch the Throne (Deluxe edition)	2011		
"Impossible"	Kanye West featuring Twista and Keyshia Cole	Kanye West	Non-album single	2006		
"Intro" (skit)	Kanye West	Kanye West	The College Dropout	2004		
"It's Alright"	Kanye West featuring Mase and John Legend	Kanye West; Mason Betha; John Stephens	The College Dropout Video Anthology	2005		
"Jail"	Kanye West	John Moylett Dem Jointz Nikki Grier The Influence 88-Keys Mark Williams Mike Dean Raul Cubina Saul Solymar Jay-Z Kanye West	Donda	2021		E
"Jesus Is Lord"	Kanye West	Kanye West; Angel Lopez; Brian Miller; Claude Léveillée; Federico Vindver; Timothy Mosley	Jesus Is King	2019		
"Jesus Walks"	Kanye West	Kanye West; Che Smith	The College Dropout	2004		
"Jonah"	Kanye West	Kanye West Cydel Young Leonard Harris Albert Daniels Malik Yusef Mike Dean Durk Banks Wesley Glass Dexter Mills Orlando Wilder Michal Suski Tahrence Brown Javon Tavoris	Donda	2021		
"The Joy"	Jay-Z & Kanye West	Kanye West; Shawn Carter; Curtis Mayfield; Peter Phillips; Scott Mescudi; John Cameron; John Zachary	Watch the Throne (Deluxe edition)	2011		
"Junya"	Kanye West	Terrence Thornton Kanye West Cydel Young Warren Trotter Rennard East Malik Yusef Kendall Bailey Raul Cubina Dexter Mills William Walsh Jordan Carter Nasir Pemberton Mark Williams	Donda	2021		
"Kids See Ghosts"	Kids See Ghosts featuring Yasiin Bey	Kanye West; Scott Mescudi; Yasiin Bey; Andrew Dawson; Justin Vernon	Kids See Ghosts	2018		
"Last Call"	Kanye West	Kanye West; Michael Perretta	The College Dropout	2004		
"Late"	Kanye West	Kanye West	Late Registration	2005		
"Lift Off"	Jay-Z & Kanye West featuring Beyoncé	Kanye West; Shawn Carter; Beyoncé Knowles; Jeff Bhasker; Mike Dean; Peter Hernandez; Seal Samuel	Watch the Throne	2011		
"Life of the Party"	Kanye West & Andre 3000	Kanye West Frederico Vindver Raul Cubina Mark Williams Brian Miller Jahmal Gwin Dwayne Abernathy Jr Derek Watkins Malik Yusef Terence Thornton Rennard East Norma Jean Toney Paul Anastasio Jack Hansen Bruce Kirkman Andre Benjamin Anthony Khan	Donda	2021		
"Lift Yourself"	Kanye West	Kanye West; James Massie; Sidney Winters	Non-album single	2018		
"Lil Jimmy" (skit)	Kanye West	Kanye West	The College Dropout	2004		
"Looking For Trouble"	Kanye West featuring Pusha T, Cyhi the Prynce, Big Sean and J. Cole		GOOD Fridays and Friday Night Lights	2010		
"Lord Lord Lord"	Kanye West featuring Mos Def, Swizz Beatz, Raekwon and Charlie Wilson		GOOD Fridays	2010		
"Lost in the World"	Kanye West featuring Bon Iver	Kanye West; Jeff Bhasker; Manu Dibango; Justin Vernon; Gil Scott-Heron	My Beautiful Dark Twisted Fantasy	2010		
"Love Lockdown"	Kanye West	Kanye West; Jeff Bhasker; Jenny-Bea Englishman; Malik Jones; LaNeah Menzies	808s & Heartbreak	2008		
"Low Lights"	Kanye West	Kanye West; Mike Dean; Jerome Potter; Samuel Griesemer; Sandy Rivera	The Life of Pablo	2016		
"Made In America"	Jay-Z & Kanye West featuring Frank Ocean	Kanye West; Shawn Carter; Shama Joseph; Mike Dean; Christopher Breaux	Watch the Throne	2011		
"Mercy. 1"	Kanye West, Big Sean, Pusha T and 2 Chainz	Kanye West; Stephan Taft; Sean Anderson; Terrence Thornton; Tauheed Epps; James Thomas; Denzie Beagle; Winston Riley; Reggie Williams	Cruel Summer	2012		
"Monster"	Kanye West featuring Rick Ross, Jay-Z, Nicki Minaj and Bon Iver	Kanye West; Shawn Carter; Patrick Reynolds; Mike Dean; William Roberts II; Onika Maraj; Justin Vernon; Jeff Bhasker	My Beautiful Dark Twisted Fantasy	2010		
"Moon"	Kanye West	Caleb Tolliver Evan Mast Jahmal Gwin Kanye West Khalil Abdul-Rahman Malik Yusef Scott Mescudi	Donda	2021		
"The Morning"	Raekwon, Pusha T, Raekwon, Common, 2 Chainz, Cyhi the Prynce, Kid Cudi and D'banj	Kanye West; Ramon Ibanga; Jeff Bhasker; Jacques Webster; Corey Woods; Terrence Thornton; Lonnie Lynn; Tauheed Epps; Cydel Young; Andrea Martin; Alan Lerner; Frederick Loewe	Cruel Summer	2012		
"Murder to Excellence"	Jay-Z & Kanye West	Kanye West; Shawn Carter; Kasseem Dean; Larry Griffin, Jr. Scott Mescudi; Quincy Jones; Harvey Mason, Jr. Joel Rosenbaum; Caiphus Semenya; Bill Summers	Watch the Throne	2011		
"My Way Home"	Kanye West featuring Common	Kanye West; Lonnie Lynn; Gil Scott-Heron	Late Registration	2005		
"Nah Nah Nah"	Kanye West	Kanye West; Dwayne Abernathy Jr.	Donda	2020		
"Nah Nah Nah (Remix)"	Kanye West featuring DaBaby and 2 Chainz	Kanye West; Dwayne Abernathy Jr.	Donda	2020		
"Never Let Me Down"	Kanye West featuring Jay-Z and J. Ivy	Kanye West; Shawn Carter; James Richardson; Michael Bolton; Bruce Kulick	The College Dropout	2004		
"New Day"	Jay-Z & Kanye West	Kanye West; Shawn Carter; Robert Diggs; Mike Dean; Leslie Bricusse; Anthony Newley	Watch the Throne	2011		
"New God Flow. 1"	Kanye West, Pusha T and Ghostface Killah	Kanye West; Terrence Thornton; Herb Rooney; Ronald Bean; Highleigh Crizoe; Dennis Coles; G.I. Townsend; Marcos Valle	Cruel Summer	2012		
"New Slaves"	Kanye West	Kanye West; Travis Scott; Christopher Breaux; Cydel Young; Ben Bronfman; Malik Jones; Che Smith; Elon Rutberg; Sakiya Sandifer; Louis Johnson; Mike Dean; Gabor Presser; Anna Adamis	Yeezus	2013		
"The New Workout Plan"	Kanye West	Kanye West	The College Dropout	2004		
"The New Workout Plan" (Remix)	Kanye West featuring Fonzworth Bentley, Luke and Twista	Kanye West; Derek Watkins; Chad Mitchell; Jon Smith	The College Dropout Video Anthology	2005		
"Niggas in Paris"	Jay-Z & Kanye West	Kanye West; Shawn Carter; Chauncey Hollis; Mike Dean	Watch the Throne	2011		Fm
"No Child Left Behind"	Kanye West	Cashmere Brown Jahmal Gwin Mike Levy Tavoris Hollins, Jr. Kanye West	Donda	2021		
"No Church in the Wild"	Jay-Z & Kanye West featuring Frank Ocean	Kanye West; Shawn Carter; Christopher Breaux; Charles Njapa; Mike Dean; Terius Nash; Gary Wright; Phil Manzanera; James Brown; Joseph Roach	Watch the Throne	2011		
"No Mistakes"	Kanye West	Kanye West; Mike Dean; Edwin Hawkins; Cydel Young; Malik Yusef; Ricky Walters; Che Pope; Kenneth Pershon; Terrance Boykin	Ye	2018		
"No More Parties in LA"	Kanye West	Kanye West; Otis Jackson, Jr. Kendrick Duckworth; John Watson; Walter Morrison; Herbert Rooney; Ronald Bean; Highleigh Crizoe; Dennis Coles; Larry Graham; Tina Graham; Sam Dees	The Life of Pablo	2016		
"Off the Grid"	Kanye West	Kanye West Cydel Young Elias Klughammer Samuel Gloade David Ruoff Billy Walsh Raul Cubina Mark Williams Jordan Carter Maxie Ryles Eric Sloan Orlando L. Wilder Aswad Asif Tobias Smith	Donda	2021		Cm
"Ok Ok"	Kanye West	Billy Walsh Cydel Young Denzel Charles Kanye West Louis Bell Malik Yusef Matthew Samuels Miles McCollum Orlando Wilder Rennard East Tavoris Hollins Terrence Thornton Tobias Smith	Donda	2021		
"On God"	Kanye West	Kanye West; Cydel Young; Federico Vindver; Jahmal Gwin; Jordan Timothy Jenks; Michael Cerda; Dijon Isaiah McFarlane	Jesus Is King	2019		
"On Sight"	Kanye West	Kanye West; Guy-Manuel de Homem-Christo; Thomas Bangalter; Malik Jones; Che Smith; Elon Rutberg; Cydel Young; Mike Dean	Yeezus	2013		
"The One"	Kanye West, Big Sean, 2 Chainz, and Marsha Ambrosius	Kanye West; Sean Anderson; Tauheed Epps; Marsha Ambrosius; Sam Bruno; Byron Thomas; Malik Jones; James Fauntleroy II; C. Smith; Carlton Ridenhour; James Boxley; Dave Barker; Winston Riley; Ansell Collins	Cruel Summer	2012		
"Only One"	Kanye West featuring Paul McCartney	Kanye West; Paul McCartney; Kirby Lauryen; Mike Dean; Noah Goldstein	So Help Me God	2014		
"Otis"	Jay-Z & Kanye West featuring Otis Redding	Kanye West; Shawn Carter; Harry M. Woods; Jimmy Campbell; Reg Connelly; Kirk Robinson; Roy Hammond; James Brown; Joseph Roach	Watch the Throne	2011		
"Paranoid"	Kanye West featuring Mr Hudson	Kanye West; Patrick Reynolds; Scott Mescudi; Dexter Mills; Jeff Bhasker	808s & Heartbreak	2008		
"Pinocchio Story (Freestyle Live from Singapore)"	Kanye West	Kanye West	808s & Heartbreak	2008		
"Power"	Kanye West	Kanye West; Larry Griffin, Jr. Mike Dean; Jeff Bhasker; Andwele Gardner; Ken Lewis; Francois Bernheim; Jean-Pierre Lang; Boris Bergman; Robert Fripp; Michael Giles; Greg Lake; Ian McDonald; Peter Sinfield	My Beautiful Dark Twisted Fantasy	2010		Cm
"Praise God"	Kanye West	Kanye West Che Smith Anthony Khan Jacques Webster Samuel Gloade Malik Yusef Mike Dean Raul Cubina Mark Williams Hykeem Carter Aqeel Tate Eric Sloan Mark Mbogo	Donda	2021		
"Primetime"	Jay-Z & Kanye West	Kanye West; Shawn Carter; Ernest Wilson; Russell Simmons; Lawrence Smith; Maureen Reid	Watch the Throne (Deluxe edition)	2011		
"Pt. 2"	Kanye West	Kanye West; Rick Rubin; Cydel Young; Sidney Selby III; Adnan Khan; Caroline Shaw; Pat Reynolds; T.L. Barrett	The Life of Pablo	2016		
"Real Friends"	Kanye West	Kanye West; Matthew Samuels; Adam Feeney; Kejuan Muchita; Darren King; Cydel Young; Glenda "Gizzle" Proby; Tyrone Griffin, Jr. Mike Dean; Noah Goldstein; Jalil Hutchins; Lawrence Smith	The Life of Pablo	2016		
"Reborn"	Kids See Ghosts featuring Pusha T	Kanye West; Scott Mescudi; Evan Mast; Oladipo Omishore	Kids See Ghosts	2018		
"Remote Control"	Kanye West	Charles Njapa Jeffery Williams Kanye West Kevin Gomringer Malik Yusef Mark Williams Mike Dean Nasir Pemberton Raul Cubina Tim Gomringer	Donda	2021		
"Remote Control pt 2"	Kanye West	Kanye West Teddy Walton Jeffery Williams Raul Cubina Scott Mescudi Charles Njapa Nasir Pemberton Mark Williams Tim Gomringer Kevin Gomringer Cydel Young Malik Yusef El Shabazz Jones Michael Dean	Donda	2021		
"RoboCop"	Kanye West	Kanye West; Jenny-Bea Englishman; Malik Jones; Dexter Mills; Scott Mescudi; Antony von Williams; Jeff Bhasker; Faheem Najm; Jay Jenkins; Patrick Doyle	808s & Heartbreak	2008		
"Roses"	Kanye West	Kanye West; Bill Withers	Late Registration	2005		
"Runaway"	Kanye West featuring Pusha T	Kanye West; Emile Haynie; Terrence Thornton; Jeff Bhasker; Mike Dean; Malik Jones; John Branch	My Beautiful Dark Twisted Fantasy	2010		E
"Saint Pablo"	Kanye West	Kanye West; Sampha Sisay	The Life of Pablo	2016		
"Say You Will"	Kanye West	Kanye West; Consequence; Jeff Bhasker; Jay Jenkins	808s & Heartbreak	2008		
"School Spirit"	Kanye West	Kanye West; Aretha Franklin	The College Dropout	2004		
"School Spirit Skit 1"	Kanye West	Kanye West	The College Dropout	2004		
"School Spirit Skit 2"	Kanye West	Kanye West	The College Dropout	2004		
"See Me Now"	Kanye West featuring Beyoncé, Charlie Wilson and Big Sean	Kanye West; Sean Anderson; Beyoncé Knowles; Charles Wilson	My Beautiful Dark Twisted Fantasy (iTunes edition)	2010		
"See You in My Nightmares"	Kanye West featuring Lil Wayne	Kanye West; Ernest Wilson; Jeff Bhasker; Dwayne Carter	808s & Heartbreak	2008		
"Selah"	Kanye West	Kanye West; Cydel Young; Dexter Raymond Mills Jr. Federico Vindver; Gene Thornton; Jahmal Gwin; Jeffrey LaValley; Rennard East; Terrace Thornton; Evan Mast; Matthew Leon; John Boyd; Adam Wright	Jesus Is King	2019		
"Send It Up"	Kanye West	Kanye West; Louis Johnson; Guy-Manuel de Homem-Christo; Alejandro Ghersi; Mike Levy; Sakiya Sandifer; Ab Liva; Elon Rutberg; Mike Dean; Moses Davis; Colin York; Lowell Dunbar	Yeezus	2013		
"Siiiiiiiiilver Surffffeeeeer Intermission" (skit)	Kanye West	Charly Wingate; Karim Kharbouch	The Life of Pablo	2016		
"Skit #1"	Kanye West	—N/a	Late Registration	2005		
"Skit #2"	Kanye West	—N/a	Late Registration	2005		
"Skit #3"	Kanye West	—N/a	Late Registration	2005		
"Skit #4"	Kanye West	—N/a	Late Registration	2005		
"Slow Jamz"	Kanye West featuring Twista and Jamie Foxx	Kanye West; Carl Mitchell; Burt Bacharach; Hal David	The College Dropout and Kamikaze	2004		
"So Appalled"	Kanye West featuring Swizz Beatz, Jay-Z, Pusha T, Cyhi the Prynce and RZA	Kanye West; Ernest Wilson; Mike Dean; Shawn Carter; Terrence Thornton; Cydel Young; Kaseem Dean; Robert Diggs; Manfred Mann	My Beautiful Dark Twisted Fantasy	2010		
"Spaceship"	Kanye West featuring GLC and Consequence	Kanye West; Leonard Harris; Dexter Mills; Marvin Gaye; Gwen Gordy Fuqua; Sandra Greene	The College Dropout	2004		
"Street Lights"	Kanye West	Kanye West; Jenny-Bea Englishman; Antony von Williams; Benjamin McIldowie	808s & Heartbreak	2008		
"Stronger"	Kanye West	Kanye West; Thomas Banghalter; Edwin Birdsong; Guy-Manuel de Homem-Christo	Graduation	2007		D#m
"Stronger (Andrew Dawson Remix)"	Kanye West featuring Andrew Dawson	Kanye West; Thomas Banghalter; Edwin Birdsong; Guy-Manuel de Homem-Christo	Graduation	2007		
"Stronger (A-Trak Remix)"	Kanye West featuring A-Trak	Kanye West; Thomas Banghalter; Edwin Birdsong; Guy-Manuel de Homem-Christo	Graduation	2007		
"Take One for the Team"	Kanye West featuring Pusha T, Cyhi the Prynce and Keri Hilson		GOOD Fridays	2010		
"That's My Bitch"	Jay-Z & Kanye West	Kanye West; Shawn Carter; Kamaal Fareed; Jeff Bhasker; Justin Vernon; James Brown; Bobby Byrd; Ronald Lenhoff; Jeremiah Lordan	Watch the Throne	2011		
"Through the Wire"	Kanye West	Kanye West; David Foster; Tom Keane; Cynthia Weil	The College Dropout	2004		Am
"To the World"	Kanye West, Teyana Taylor and R. Kelly	Kanye West; Robert Kelly; Andrew Wansel; Warren Felder; Che Smith; Malik Jones	Cruel Summer	2012		
"Touch the Sky"	Kanye West featuring Lupe Fiasco	Kanye West; Wasalu Jaco; Justin Smith; Curtis Mayfield	Late Registration	2005		
"Two Words"	Kanye West featuring Mos Def, Freeway and the Harlem Boys Choir	Kanye West; Dante Smith; Leslie Pridgen; Lou Wilson; Ric Wilson; Carlos Wilson	The College Dropout	2004		
"Ultralight Beam"	Kanye West	Kanye West; Mike Dean; Cydel Young; Kelly Price; Terius Nash; Nico "Donnie Trumpet" Segal; Kirk Franklin; Kasseem Dean; Chancellor Bennett; Noah Goldstein; Jerome Potter; Samuel Griesemer; Derrick Watkins	The Life of Pablo	2016		
"Up From the Ashes"	Kanye West	Kanye West Sean Leon Alex Ernewein Frederico Vindver Angel Lopez Timbaland Terrence Thornton Gene Thornton Rennard East Timothy Mosley N Grier	Donda	2021		
"Us Placers"	Child Rebel Soldier (Note: Supergroup consisting of Kanye West, Lupe Fiasco, and Pharrell Williams.)	Wasalu Jaco; Kanye West; Pharrell Williams; Thom Yorke	Can't Tell Me Nothing	2007		
"Use This Gospel"	Kanye West featuring Clipse and Kenny G	Kanye West; Angel Lopez; Derek Watkins; Federico Vindver; Gene Thornton; Jahmal Gwin; Jordan Timothy Jenks; Kenneth Bruce Gorelick; Rennard East; Terrence Thornton; Timothy Mosley; Matthew Leon; Michael Suski	Jesus Is King	2019		
"Vultures"	Kanye West and Ty Dolla Sign featuring Bump J	Kanye West; Tyrone William Griffin Jr.	—N/a	2023		
"Violent Crimes"	Kanye West	Kanye West; Mike Dean; Cydel Young; Kevin Parker; Malik Yusef; 7 Aurelius; Danielle Balbuena; Tyrone Griffin, Jr. Kenneth Pershon; Irving Lorenzo; Jordan Thorpe	Ye	2018		
"Wake Up Mr. West" (skit)	Kanye West	Kanye West; Gerry Goffin; Michael Masser	Late Registration	2005		
"Wash Us In The Blood"	Kanye West featuring Travis Scott	Kanye West; Jacques Webster II; Ronald Spence, Jr. Jahmal Gwin; Michael Mule; Isaac DeBoni; Aaron Gomez; Dwayne Abernathy Jr. Israel Boyd; Aaron Butts; Mark Mbogo	Non-album single	2020		
"Water"	Kanye West featuring Ant Clemons	Kanye West; Anthony Clemons; Alexander Nelson Klein; Angel Lopez; Bruce Haack; Federico Vindver; Jahmal Gwin; Timothy Mosley; Victory Elyse Boyd	Jesus Is King	2019		
"Waves"	Kanye West	Kanye West; Chris Brown; Scott Mescudi; Cydel Young; Tony Williams; Elon Rutberg; Ross Birchard; Derrick Watkins; Mike Dean; Chancellor Bennett; Leland Wayne; Ernest Brown; Fred Brathwaithe; Robin Diggs; Kevin Ferguson; Theodore Livingston; Darryl Mason; James Whipper	The Life of Pablo	2016		
"We Can Make It Better"	Kanye West featuring Common, Q-Tip, Talib Kweli and Rhymefest	Kanye West; Lonnie Lynn; Jonathan Davis; Talib Kweli; Che Smith	Hurricane Relief: Come Together Now and Late Registration (UK, Japanese and Australian editions)	2005		
"We Don't Care"	Kanye West	Kanye West; Ross Vanelli	The College Dropout	2004		
"We Major"	Kanye West featuring Nas and Really Doe	Kanye West; Nasir Jones; Warren Trotter; Warryn Campbell; Maureen Reid; Russell Simmons; Larry Smith; Andre Williams	Late Registration	2005		
"Welcome to Heartbreak"	Kanye West featuring Kid Cudi	Kanye West; Jeff Bhasker; Patrick Reynolds; Scott Mescudi	808s & Heartbreak	2008		
"Welcome to the Jungle"	Jay-Z & Kanye West	Kanye West; Shawn Carter; Kasseem Dean; Mike Dean	Watch the Throne	2011		
"White Dress"	Kanye West	Kanye West; Robert Diggs; Mario Bennett	The Man with the Iron Fists: Original Motion Picture Soundtrack	2012		
"Who Gon Stop Me"	Jay-Z & Kanye West	Kanye West; Shawn Carter; Shama Joseph; Mike Dean; Maurice Simmonds; Joshua Kierkegaard	Watch the Throne	2011		
"Who Will Survive in America"	Kanye West	Kanye West; Jeff Bhasker; Gil Scott-Heron	My Beautiful Dark Twisted Fantasy	2010		
"Why I Love You"	Jay-Z & Kanye West featuring Mr Hudson	Kanye West; Shawn Carter; Mike Dean; Philippe Cerboneschi; Hubert Blanc-Francard; Tony Camillo; Mary Sawyer	Watch the Throne	2011		
"Wolves"	Kanye West	Kanye West; Magnus August Høiberg; Alan Stanley Soucy Brinsmead; Noah Goldstein; Elon Rutberg; Cydel Young; Ryan McDermott; Mike Dean; Kirby Lauryen; Pat Reynolds	The Life of Pablo	2016		G#m
"Workout Plan" (skit)	Kanye West	Kanye West	The College Dropout	2004		
"Wouldn't Leave"	Kanye West featuring PartyNextDoor	Kanye West; Mike Dean; Francis Starlite; Reverend W.A. Donaldson; Justin Vernon; Malik Yusef; Jeremih Felton; Jahron Braithwaite; Tyrone Griffin, Jr. Noah Goldstein; Kenneth Pershon; Terrance Boykin; Jordan Thorpe	Ye	2018		
"Wouldn't You Like to Ride?"	Common, JV, Kanye West & Malik Yusef	Malik Yusef; Lonnie Lynn; Kanye West; S Charles	Coach Carter: Music from the Motion Picture and The Great Chicago Fire: A Cold Day In Hell	2005		
"XTCY"	Kanye West	Kanye West; Andrew Dawson; David Payton	Non-album single	2018		
"Ye vs. the People"	Kanye West featuring T.I.	Kanye West; Clifford Harris; Lamont Dozier; Brian Holland; Edward Holland Jr.	Non-album single	2018		
"Yikes"	Kanye West	Kanye West; Mike Dean; James Mbarack Achieng; Cydel Young; Dexter Mills; Malik Yusef; Ayub Ogada; Aubrey Graham; Jeremih Felton; Danielle Balbuena; Jordan Jenks; Asten Harris; Kenneth Pershon; Terrance Boykin; Jordan Thorpe	Ye	2018		
"Donda"	Kanye West featuring Stalone and The World Famous Tony Williams	Donda West Raul Cubina Finatik Mark Williams BoogzDaBeast Zac Kanye West	Donda	2021		
"Keep My Spirit Alive"	Kanye West featuring Conway the Machine and Westside Gunn	Hall & Nash KRS-One Dem Jointz Rico Nichols Darius Woodley Raul Cubina Finatik Mark William BoogzDaBeast Zac Royce da 5'9" KayCyy Kanye West	Donda	2021		
"Jesus Lord"	Kanye West featuring Jay Electronica	Fya Man Rooga Larry Hoover Jr Gesaffelstein Mike Dean Jay Electronica Kanye West	Donda	2021		
"New Again"	Kanye West	Farsi Mia Wallis Raul Cubina Nizzy Mark Williams BoogzDaBeast Dem Jointz 88-Keys CyHi The Prynce Kanye West	Donda	2021		
"Tell the Vision"	Kanye West featuring Pop Smoke	Raul Cubina Finatik Mark Williams Kanye West BoogzDaBeast Zac Pop Smoke	Donda	2021		
"Lord I Need You"	Kanye West	Pusha T E*Vax Wheezy Finatik Zac SAINt JHN Kanye West	Donda	2021		
"Pure Souls"	Kanye West featuring Roddy Ricch and Shenseea	CyHi The Prynce BEAM Simon Plummer Raphael Saadiq Dizzycleanface Shenseea Fya Man Tim Friedrich Raul Cubina Mike Dean Mark Williams BoogzDaBeast Shuko Bastian Völkel Roddy Ricch Kanye West	Donda	2021		
"Jail pt 2"	Kanye West featuring DaBaby and Marilyn Manson	Sean Solymar Raul Cubina Mike Dean Mark Williams DaBaby Dem Jointz 88-Keys Marilyn Manson Kanye West	Donda	2021		E
"Ok Ok pt 2"	Kanye West featuring Rooga and Shenseea	Fya Man BEAM Simon Plummer Ab-Liva Dizzycleanface Rooga Shenseea Louis Bell Fivio Foreign Boi-1da Kanye West	Donda	2021		
"Junya pt 2"	Kanye West featuring Playboi Carti and Ty Dolla ign	Ab-Liva Ty Dolla Sign Roark Bailey Raul Cubina Digital Nas Mark Williams Kanye West Playboi Carti	Donda	2021		
"Jesus Lord pt 2"	Kanye West featuring Jay Electronica and The LOX	Fya Man Sheek Louch Gesaffelstein Mike Dean Larry Hoover Jr Swizz Beatz Jadakiss Styles P Jay Electronica Kanye West	Donda	2021		

=== As featured artist ===
Name of song, featured performers, writer(s), original release, and year of release
Song	Artist(s)	Writer(s)	Original release	Year	Ref.
"All We Got"	Chance the Rapper featuring Kanye West and Chicago Children's Choir	Chancellor Bennett; Kanye West; Nate Fox; Nico Segal; Peter Cottontale; Greg Landfair	Coloring Book	2016	
"All Your Fault"	Big Sean featuring Kanye West	Sean Anderson; Welbon Morris, Jr. Emmanuel Nickerson; Lee Stone; Nashiem Myrick; David Pack; Terius Nash; Noah Goldstein; Kanye West	Dark Sky Paradise	2015	
"Alors on Danse" (Remix)	Stromae featuring Kanye West and Gilbere Forte	Paul Haver; Kanye West	—N/a	2009	
"Alright"	Twista featuring Kanye West	Chad Mitchell; Kanye West; Jeff Bhasker; Ernest Wilson	Category F5	2009	
"Amen"	Pusha T featuring Kanye West and Young Jeezy	Terrence Thornton; Demetrius Stewart; Kanye West; Jay Wayne Jenkins	Fear of God II: Let Us Pray	2011	
"American Boy"	Estelle featuring Kanye West	William Adams; Estelle Swaray; John Stephens; Josh Lopez; Caleb Speir; Keith Harris	Shine	2008	
"Another You"	The World Famous Tony Williams featuring Kanye West	Antony Williams; Kanye West; Roosevelt Harrell	King or the Fool	2012	
"Anyone but Him"	Mr Hudson featuring Kanye West	Benjamin McIldowie; Kanye West	Straight No Chaser	2009	
"Anything"	Patti LaBelle featuring Kanye West, Consequence and Mary Mary	Gerald Haddon; Nisan Stewart; Kanye West; Dexter Mills	The Gospel According to Patti LaBelle	2006	
"Ayyy Girl"	JYJ featuring Kanye West and Malik Yusef	Kyoko Hamler; P. Phenom; Malik Yusef	The Beginning	2009	
"Back Like That" (Remix)	Ghostface Killah featuring Kanye West and Ne-Yo	Dennis Coles; Kanye West; Shaffer Smith; V Brown	More Fish	2006	
"Ballin'"	Juicy J featuring Kanye West	Jordan Houston; Kanye West; Bryan Simmons; Gamal Lewis; Eddie Holman; Michael Foster; Kevin Gomringer; Tim Gomringer	Non-album single	2016	
"Beat Goes On"	Madonna featuring Kanye West	Madonna; Pharrell Williams; Kanye West	Hard Candy	2008	
"Because of You" (Remix)	Ne-Yo featuring Kanye West	Mikkel Eriksen; Tor Erik Hermansen; Shaffer Chimere Smith	—N/a	2007	
"The Big Screen"	GLC featuring Kanye West	Leonard Harris; Kanye West	Non-album single	2009	
"Birthday Song"	2 Chainz featuring Kanye West	Tauheed Epps; Kanye West; Mike Dean; Sonny Uwaezuoke	Based on a T.R.U. Story	2012	
"Blazin'"	Nicki Minaj featuring Kanye West	Onika Maraj; Kanye West; Andrew Theilk; Keith Forsey; Steve Schiff	Pink Friday	2010	
"Blessings" (Extended version)	Big Sean featuring Drake and Kanye West	Sean Anderson; Anderson Hernandez; Quentin Miller; Aubrey Graham; Kanye West; Allen Ritter	Non-album single	2015	
"The Bounce"	Jay-Z featuring Kanye West	Shawn Carter; Timothy Mosley	The Blueprint 2: The & the Curse	2002	
"Brand New"	Rhymefest featuring Kanye West	Che Smith; Kanye West	Blue Collar	2006	
"The Brenda Song"	Abstract Mindstate featuring Kanye West	Daphne Mitchell; Greg Lewis; Kanye West	Dreams Still Inspire	2021	
"Buy U a Drank (Shawty Snappin')" (Remix)	T-Pain featuring Kanye West	Faheem Najm; Jasiel Robinson; Kanye West	Non-album single	2007	
"Can't Stop"	Theophilus London featuring Kanye West	Theophilus London; Kanye West; Charles Njapa; Club cheval Brodinski; Brittany Barber; Miri Ben-Ari; Norman Feels; James Smith	Vibes	2014	
"Castro"	Yo Gotti featuring Kanye West, Big Sean, 2 Chainz and Quavo	Mario Mims; Benjamin Diehl; Kanye West; Sean Anderson; Tauheed Epps; Quavious Marshall	White Friday (CM9)	2016	
"Confessions Part II" (Remix)	Usher featuring Shyne, Kanye West and Twista	Usher Raymond; Jermaine Dupri; Bryan-Michael Cox; Moses Levi; Kanye West; Chad Mitchell	Confessions	2004	
"Cops Shot the Kid"	Nas featuring Kanye West	Nasir Jones; Ricky Walters; Richard Pryor; Kanye West; Andrew Dawson; Che Smith	Nasir	2018	
"Dat Side"	Cyhi the Prynce featuring Kanye West	Kanye West; Cydel Young; Edward Davidi; Brandon Black; Katherine Mills; Marcus Byrd; Michael Davis; Girvan Henry	No Dope on Sundays	2017	
"Deuces" (Remix)	Chris Brown featuring Drake, Kanye West and André 3000	Chris Brown; Aubrey Graham; Kanye West; Andre Benjamin	Non-album single	2010	
"Digital Girl"	Jamie Foxx featuring Kanye West and the-Dream	Christopher Stewart; Tarius Nash; Kanye West; Faheem Najm; David Balfour	Intuition	2008	
"Digital Girl" (Single Version)	Jamie Foxx featuring Drake, Kanye West and the-Dream	Eric Bishop; Aubrey Graham; Kanye West; Terius Nash; Christopher Stewart	Intuition	2009	
"Down"	Chris Brown featuring Kanye West	Derrick Baker; Chris Brown; Kanye West	Exclusive	2007	
"Down and Out"	Cam'ron featuring Kanye West and Syleena Johnson	Cameron Giles; Kanye West; Fred Briggs	Purple Haze	2004	
"Drunk In Love" (Remix)	Beyoncé featuring Jay-Z and Kanye West	Noel Fisher; Beyoncé Knowles; Shawn Carter; Eric Proctor; Rasool Diaz; Timothy Mosley; J-Roc	Beyoncé: Platinum Edition	2014	
"E.T."	Katy Perry featuring Kanye West	Katy Perry; Lukasz Gottwald; Max Martin; Joshua Coleman; Kanye West	Teenage Dream	2011	
"Ego" (Remix)	Beyoncé featuring Kanye West	Elvis Williams; Harold Lilly; Beyoncé Knowles; Kanye West	Above and Beyoncé: Video Collection & Dance Mixes	2009	
"Erase Me"	Kid Cudi featuring Kanye West	Scott Mescudi; Kanye West; Frank Romano	Man on the Moon II: The Legend of Mr. Rager	2010	
"Everyone Nose (All the Girls Standing In the Line for the Bathroom)" (Remix)	N.E.R.D featuring Kanye West, Lupe Fiasco and Pusha T	Pharrell Williams; Chad Hugo; Kanye West; Wasalu Jaco; Terrence Thornton	Seeing Sounds (iTunes edition)	2008	
"Everything"	Nas featuring The-Dream and Kanye West	Nasir Jones; Kanye West; Mike Dean; Terius Nash; Benjamin Levin; Caroline Shaw; Magnus August Høiberg; Patrick Reynolds; Adrian Owusu; Jake Ferguson; Malcolm Catto	Nasir	2018	
"Extravaganza"	Jamie Foxx featuring Kanye West		Unpredictable	2005	
"Eyez Closed"	Snoop Dogg featuring Kanye West and John Legend	Calvin Broadus; James Bromley Spicer; Jacob Martin; John Stephens; Kanye Omari West; Russell Wendell Simmons	Doggumentary	2011	
"Feel Me"	Tyga featuring Kanye West	Michael Stevenson; Kanye West; Raul Gonzalez; Brandon Tillman; Alexander Edward	BitchImTheShit2	2017	
"Figure It Out"	French Montana featuring Kanye West and Nas	Karim Kharbouch; Erik Alcock; Khalil Abdul-Rahman; Kanye West; Nasir Jones	MC4	2016	
"Flight School"	GLC featuring Kanye West and T-Pain	Leonard Harris; Arron Butts; Faheem Najm; Kanye West	Love, Life & Loyalty	2009	
"Fly Away"	Miri Ben-Ari featuring Fabolous and Kanye West		The Hip-Hop Violinist	2005	
"Forever"	Drake featuring Kanye West, Lil Wayne and Eminem	Aubrey Graham; Kanye West; Dwayne Carter; Matthew Samuels	Music Inspired by More than a Game and Relapse: Refill	2009	
"Friends"	Francis and the Lights featuring Bon Iver and Kanye West	Aaron Lammer; Francis Farewell Starlite; BJ Burton; Rostam Batmanglij; Justin Vernon	Farewell, Starlite!	2016	
"Get By" (Remix)	Talib Kweli featuring Jay-Z, Mos Def, Kanye West and Busta Rhymes	Talib Kweli Greene; Kanye West; Shawn Carter; Dante Smith; Trevor Smith; Nina Simone	Non-album single	2003	
"Gettin' It In"	Jadakiss featuring Kanye West	Jason Phillips; Kanye West	Kiss of Death	2004	
"Glow"	Drake featuring Kanye West	Aubrey Graham; Kanye West; Shebib; Malik Jones; Sakiya Sandifer; Philip Bailey; Noah Goldstein; Maurice White; Carlo Montagnese; Majid Al-Maskati; Gabriel Garzón-Montano; Jefferies; Ilsey Juber; Louis Johnson; Cydel Young; Kenza Samir; Jordan Ullman	More Life	2017	
"Gifted"	N.A.S.A. featuring Kanye West		The Spirit of Apollo	2009	
"Glenwood"	Big Sean featuring Kanye West		Finally Famous Vol. 3: Big (Original release)	2009	
"Go Hard"	DJ Khaled featuring Kanye West and T-Pain	Khaled Khaled; Faheem Najm; Kanye West; Madonna Ciccone	We Global	2008	
"The Good, the Bad, the Ugly"	Consequence featuring Kanye West		Don't Quit Your Day Job!	2007	
"Guard Down"	Ty Dolla $ign featuring Kanye West and Diddy	Tyrone Griffin, Jr. Kanye West; Sean Combs; Chauncey Hollis; P. Jones	Free TC	2015	
"Hate"	Jay-Z featuring Kanye West	Shawn Carter; Kanye West; Jeff Bhasker	The Blueprint 3	2009	
"Higher"	Do or Die featuring Kanye West		D.O.D.	2005	
"Hold On" (Remix)	Dwele featuring Kanye West	Dwayne Bastiany; Eric Roberson; Kev Brown; Kanye West	Non-album single	2003	
"Hot Shit"	Cardi B, Kanye West & Lil Durk	Belcalis Almánzar Brytavious Chambers Durk Banks Jorden Thorpe Kanye West Marquell Jones Neville Livingston	non-album single	2022	
"Hurricane 2.0"	Thirty Seconds to Mars featuring Kanye West	Jared Leto; Kanye West	This Is War (Deluxe edition)	2011	
"Hurry"	Teyana Taylor featuring Kanye West	Kanye West; Teyana Taylor; Anthony Clemons; Uforo Ebong; Scott Carter	K.T.S.E.	2018	
"I Got a Love"	Jin featuring Kanye West		The Rest Is History	2004	
"I See Now"	Consequence featuring Kanye West and Little Brother		Take 'Em To The Cleaners	2004	
"I Still Love H.E.R."	Teriyaki Boyz featuring Kanye West		Serious Japanese	2009	
"Israel"	Al Be Back featuring Kanye West		Dying Near a Charger	2023	
"I Wish You Would"	DJ Khaled featuring Kanye West and Rick Ross	Khaled Khaled; Kanye West; William Roberts II; Hit-Boy	Kiss the Ring	2012	
"I Won"	Future featuring Kanye West	Theron Thomas; Nayvadius Wilburn; Timothy Thomas; Leland Wayne; Kanye West; Nick Seely	Honest	2014	
"I'ma Get You"	N.O.R.E. featuring Kanye West and GLC		Noreality	2007	
"In Common" (Remix)	Alicia Keys featuring Kanye West and Travis Scott	Alicia Keys; Carlo Montagnese; Taylor Parks; Billy Walsh	—N/a	2016	
"In the Mood"	Talib Kweli featuring Roy Ayers and Kanye West	Talib Kweli Greene; Kanye West; Brian Potter	Eardrum	2007	
"Is It You? (Deja Vu)" (Remix)	Made Men featuring Big Pun, Cardan and Mase		Classic Limited Edition	1999	
"It's Over"	John Legend featuring Kanye West	John Stephens; Kanye West; James Ho; Kawan Prather	Evolver	2008	
"Jesus Piece"	The Game featuring Common and Kanye West	Jayceon Taylor; Matthew Samuels; Stephen "Koz" Kozmeniuk; Brett Ryan; Kanye West; Lonnie Lynn	Jesus Piece	2012	
"Jukebox Joints"	A$AP Rocky featuring Kanye West and Joe Fox	Rakim Mayers; Kanye West; Christopher Pope; Joe Fox; Dicky Sulaksono; Warren Moore; William Robinson	At. Long. Last. A$AP	2015	
"Kanga"	6ix9ine featuring Kanye West	Daniel Hernandez; Andrew Green; Dexter Mills; Kanye West; Shane Lindstrom	Dummy Boy	2018	
"The Killing Season"	A Tribe Called Quest featuring Consequence, Talib Kweli and Kanye West	Kamaal Fareed; Jarobi White; Dexter Mills; Talib Greene	We Got It from Here... Thank You 4 Your Service	2016	
"Kinda Like a Big Deal"	Clipse featuring Kanye West	Khalil Abdul-Rahman; Pranam Injeti; Terrence Thornton; Gene Thornton; Kanye West	Til the Casket Drops	2009	
"Knock You Down"	Keri Hilson featuring Kanye West and Ne-Yo	Nate Hills; Keri Hilson; Kevin Cossom; Shaffer Smith; Marcella Araica; Kanye West	In a Perfect World...	2009	
"Like This"	DJ Clue? featuring Fabolous and Kanye West		The Professional 3	2006	
"Live Fast, Die Young"	Rick Ross featuring Kanye West	William Roberts II; Frederick Knight; Marvin Gaye; Kanye West	Teflon Don	2010	
"Love Yourself"	Mary J. Blige featuring Kanye West	Mary Blige; Kanye West|Charles Hinshaw; David D. Brown; Darhyl Camper Jr. I. Andrews	Strength of a Woman	2017	
"Lollipop" (Remix)	Lil Wayne featuring Kanye West and Static Major	Dwayne Carter; Stephen Garrett; Kanye West; Darius Harrison; Jim Jonsin; Rex Zamor	Tha Carter III (iTunes deluxe edition)	2008	
"M.P.A."	Pusha T featuring Kanye West, A$AP Rocky and the-Dream	Terrence Thornton; Kanye West; Che Pope; Mark Batson; Rakim Mayers; Terius Nash	King Push – Darkest Before Dawn: The Prelude	2015	
"Magic Man"	Malik Yusef featuring Kanye West, Common and John Legend		G.O.O.D. Morning, G.O.O.D. Night	2009	
"Make Her Say"	Kid Cudi featuring Kanye West and Common	Scott Mescudi; Kanye West; Lonnie Lynn; Stefani Germanotta; Nadir Khayat	Man On the Moon: The End of Day	2009	
"Mama"	6ix9ine featuring Nicki Minaj and Kanye West	Daniel Hernandez; Andrew Green; Dexter Mills; Kanye West; Onika Maraj; Shane Lindstrom; Rasool Diaz	Dummy Boy	2018	
"Marvin & Chardonnay"	Big Sean featuring Kanye West and Roscoe Dash	Sean Anderson; Kanye West; Jeffrey Johnson; Andrew Wansel	Finally Famous	2011	
"Maybach Music 2"	Rick Ross featuring Kanye West, T-Pain and Lil Wayne	Dwayne Carter, Jr. Kevin Crowe; Faheem Najm; Erik Ortiz; William Roberts; Dexter Wansel	Deeper Than Rap	2009	
"Mixed Personalities"	YNW Melly featuring Kanye West	Jamell Maurice Demons	We All Shine	2019	
"More"	Rhymefest featuring Kanye West		Blue Collar	2006	
"Mula"	The Game featuring Kanye West	Jayceon Taylor; Kanye West; Matthew Samuels; Rupert Thomas, Jr.	The Documentary 2	2015	
"My Baby"	Janet Jackson featuring Kanye West	Janet Jackson; Kanye West; Sean Garrett; Joni-Ayanna Portee	Damita Jo	2004	
"My City's Gone"	Francis and the Lights featuring Kanye West	Francis Starlite; Kanye West	Farewell, Starlite!	2016	
"Never Change"	Jay-Z featuring Kanye West	Shawn Carter; Kanye West; Robert Eugene Miller	The Blueprint	2001	
"No One" (Remix)	Alicia Keys featuring Kanye West	Alicia Keys; Kerry Brothers, Jr. George M. Harry; Kanye West	—N/a	2007	
"Nobody"	Chief Keef featuring Kanye West		Nobody	2014	
"One Man Can Change the World"	Big Sean featuring Kanye West and John Legend	Sean Anderson; Kanye West; John Stephens; Amaire Johnson	Dark Sky Paradise	2015	
"One Minute"	XXXTentacion featuring Kanye West and Travis Barker	Jahseh Onfroy; John Cunningham; Travis Barker; Kanye West	Skins	2018	
"Overnight Celebrity"	Twista featuring Kanye West	Chad Mitchell; Kanye West; Miri Ben-Ari; Bennett; Lenny Williams	Kamikaze	2004	
"Piss On Your Grave"	Travis Scott featuring Kanye West	Jacques Webster; Larry Price; Mike Dean; Kanye West; Ernest Brown; Noah Goldstein; Darren King	Rodeo	2015	
"Pop Style" (Extended version)	Drake featuring the Throne	Aubrey Graham; Kanye West; Shawn Carter; Adam Feeney; Matthew Samuels; Noah "40" Shebib; Rupert Thomas, Jr.	Non-album single	2016	
"Pretty Girl Rock" (Remix)	Keri Hilson featuring Kanye West	Shaffer Smith; Chuck Harmony; Ralph MacDonald; William Salter; Bill Withers; Kanye West	No Boys Allowed	2011	
"Pride N Joy"	Fat Joe featuring Kanye West, Miguel, Jadakiss, Mos Def, DJ Khaled, Busta Rhymes and Roscoe Dash	Fat Joe	Non-album single	2012	
"Pro Nails"	Kid Sister featuring Kanye West	Melisa Young; Alain Macklovitch; Kanye West; Patrick Houston; Jordan Houston; Paul Beauregard	Ultraviolet	2007	
"Promised Land"	Malik Yusef featuring Kanye West and Adam Levine		Yes We Can: Voices of a Grassroots Movement; G.O.O.D. Morning, G.O.O.D. Night	2008, 2009	
"Punch Drunk Love (The Eye)"	Common featuring Kanye West	Lonnie Lynn, Jr. Pharrell Williams; Chad Hugo; Kanye West	Universal Mind Control	2008	
"Pussy Print"	Gucci Mane featuring Kanye West	Radric Davis; Michael Williams II; Marquel Middlebrooks; Khalif Brown; Kanye West	Everybody Looking	2016	
"Put On"	Young Jeezy featuring Kanye West	Jay Jenkins; Kanye West	The Recession	2008	
"Run This Town"	Jay-Z featuring Kanye West and Rihanna	Shawn Carter; Robyn Fenty; Kanye West; Ernest Wilson; Jeff Bhasker	The Blueprint 3	2009	
"Runaway Love" (Kanye West Remix)	Justin Bieber featuring Kanye West and Raekwon	Melvin Hough II; Rivelino Wouter; Timothy Thomas; Theron Thomas; Justin Bieber; Dalvin DeGrate; Donald DeGrate; Dennis Coles; Robert Diggs; Gary Grice; Lamont Hawkins; Isaac Hayes; Jason Hunter; Russell Jones; David Porter; Clifford Smith; Corey Woods	GOOD Fridays and Never Say Never: The Remixes	2010	
"Sailing NOT Selling"	Jhené Aiko featuring Kanye West	Jhené Aiko; Kanye West	Sailing Soul(s)	2011	
"Sanctified"	Rick Ross featuring Kanye West and Big Sean	William Roberts; Sean Anderson; Kanye West; Dijon McFarlane	Mastermind	2014	
"Scape Goat (The Fix)"	D'banj featuring Kanye West	D'banj; Kanye West	DKM (D'King's Men)	2013	
"Selfish"	Slum Village featuring Kanye West and John Legend		Detroit Deli (A Taste of Detroit)	2004	
"Side 2 Side"	Three 6 Mafia featuring Kanye West and Project Pat	Jordan Houston; Paul Beauregard; Darnell Carlton; Kanye West; Patrick Houston	Most Known Unknown (Re-issue)	2005	
"Smuckers"	Tyler, the Creator featuring Lil Wayne and Kanye West	Tyler Okonma; Kanye West; Dwayne Carter, Jr. Gabriele Ducros	Cherry Bomb	2015	
"Southside"	Common featuring Kanye West	Lonnie Lynn; Kanye West; Don Covay	Finding Forever	2007	
"Start It Up"	Lloyd Banks featuring Kanye West, Fabolous, Swizz Beatz and Ryan Leslie	Christopher Lloyd; Kanye West; John Jackson; Kasseem Dean; Ryan Leslie; Carl McCormick	H.F.M. 2 (The Hunger for More 2)	2010	
"Stay Up! (Viagra)"	88-Keys featuring Kanye West	Steven Nicholas Jolley; Leslie McGregor John; A. Ingram; Tony Swain; Kanye West; Charles Njapa	The Death of Adam	2008	
"Still Dreaming"	Nas featuring Kanye West and Chrisette Michele	N. Jones; K. West; Crisette Michele Payne	Hip Hop Is Dead	2006	
"The Summer League"	Wale featuring Kanye West and Ty Dolla $ign		—N/a	2015	
"Supernova"	Mr Hudson featuring Kanye West	Benjamin McIldowie; Kanye West	Straight No Chaser	2009	
"Swagga Like Us"	T.I. & Jay-Z featuring Kanye West and Lil Wayne	Clifford Harris; Shawn Carter; Kanye West; Dwayne Carter, Jr. Mathangi Arulpragasam; Topper Headon; Mick Jones; Wesley Pentz; Paul Simonon; Joe Strummer	Paper Trail	2008	
"Take Me to the Light"	Francis and the Lights featuring Bon Iver and Kanye West	BJ Burton; Benny Blanco; Caroline Shaw; Francis Farewell Starlite; Jeff Bhasker; Justin Vernon; Kanye West; Cashmere Cat; Noah Goldstein	Take Me to the Light	2019	
"Talk About Our Love"	Brandy featuring Kanye West	Kanye West; Harold Lilly; Carlos Wilson; Louis Wilson; Ricardo A. Wilson; Claude Cave II	Afrodisiac	2004	
"Teriyaking"	Teriyaki Boyz featuring Kanye West and Big Sean		Serious Japanese	2009	
"Thank You"	Busta Rhymes featuring Q-Tip, Kanye West and Lil Wayne	Trevor Smith; Kamaal Fareed; Kanye West; Dwayne Carter; Kevin McCord	Non-album single	2013	
"That Part"	ScHoolboy Q featuring Kanye West	Quincey Hanley; Kanye West; Ronald LaTour; Daveon Jackson; Kevin Gomringer; Tim Gomringer; Mark Spears	Blank Face LP	2016	
"Therapy"	T-Pain featuring Kanye West	Faheem Najm; Kanye West; Frank Romano	Three Ringz	2008	
"This Way"	Dilated Peoples featuring Kanye West		Neighborhood Watch	2004	
"Tiimmy Turner" (Remix)	Desiigner featuring Kanye West	Sidney Selby III; Mike Dean; Kanye West	Non-album single	2016	
"Touch It"	Pusha T featuring Kanye West		Fear of God	2011	
"Walkin' on the Moon"	The-Dream featuring Kanye West	Terius Nash; Kanye West	Love vs. Money	2009	
"Watch"	Travis Scott featuring Lil Uzi Vert and Kanye West	Jacques Webster; Symere Woods; Kanye West; Jordan Jenks	Non-album single	2018	
"Welcome to the World"	T.I. featuring Kanye West and Kid Cudi	Kanye West; Clifford Harris, Jr. Scott Mescudi	No Mercy	2010	
"What Would Meek Do?"	Pusha T featuring Kanye West	Terrence Thornton; Kanye West; Jon Anderson; Christopher Squire; William Bruford	Daytona	2018	
"Wouldn't Get Far"	The Game featuring Kanye West	Jayceon Taylor; Kanye West; Marilyn McLeod; Pam Sawyer	Doctor's Advocate	2006	

== Unreleased songs ==
List of notable unreleased songs recorded by Kanye West (with known noteworthy details, album most likely recorded for, online availability, and references)
Song	Artist(s)	Note(s)	Originating album(s)	Leaked	Ref.
"12,000 Acres"	Kanye West	Recorded during sessions for Donda; Included on West's unreleased visual album Donda: With Child as a reference track by Victory Boyd	God's Country Donda	Yes	
"Alien"	Kanye West, Ant Clemons	Produced by Ronny J; Failed to make Jesus is King or Donda; Iterations/demos have been recorded by Kid Cudi, the Migos, 2 Chainz, Lil Baby, Mykki Blanco, and Sean Leon, among others.	Yandhi Jesus Is King God's Country Donda	Yes	
"Ass Shots"	Kanye West, French Montana, Cam'ron	Recorded in 2014	Yeezus 2 Cruel Winter	Yes	
"Awesome"	Kanye West, Charlie Wilson	Written by Kanye West, Hit-Boy, Roscoe Dash, and Mike Dean.; Produced by Hit-Boy and Mike Dean.; Worked on from 2011 to 2014; Featured on an episode of Keeping Up with the Kardashians that documents West and Kim Kardashian's wedding	Watch the Throne Yeezus Yeezus 2 So Help Me God	Yes	
"Bad Night/Man Up"	Kanye West, Young Thug, Tyga	Produced by Hudson Mohawke; Worked on from 2014 to 2016/2017; Alternate versions produced by DJDS and Carnage; Instrumental reworked for the 2016 video game Watch Dogs 2	Yeezus 2 So Help Me God Swish Turbo Grafx 16	Yes	
"Bianca"	Kanye West	Written by Dave Blunts and features uncredited vocals from him; Previewed on a livestream with DJ Akademiks on April 2, 2025	Cuck	Yes	
"Black Skinhead (remix)"	Kanye West, Miley Cyrus, Travis Scott	Produced by Mike Will-Made It; Chorus interpolates "Everybody Wants to Rule the World" by Tears for Fears; Travis Scott only performs ad-libs; Later renamed to "Rule the World", with a reference track by Kirby Lauryen being recorded	Yeezus 2	Yes	
"Brothers"	Kanye West, Charlie Wilson	Produced by Irv Gotti, Channel 7, and Bink; Originally intended for Love Everyone, it was reworked into "Violent Crimes" before being revisited as a potential lead single for Yandhi	Love Everyone Yandhi	Yes	
"Bulletproof"	Kanye West, Kodak Black	Written by West, Black, Jesus Bobe, and Abdallah Nawar Ahmad; Samples “Bulletproof” by La Roux; Failed to make Bully	Bully	Yes	
"Candyland"	Kanye West	Featured on early track listing for Donda 2; Also known as "Worst Mistake" or "Never Forgive Yourself / Yeah I Know"; Failed to make either version of the album	Donda 2	Yes	
"Cash to Burn"	Kanye West, Ant Clemons, Kenny G	Produced by Timbaland, BoogzDaBeast, Andy C, and Brian "AllDay" Miller; Samples "Red Light" by Greenslade; Features a verse from Styles P and saxophone by Kenny G; Failed to make Jesus is King	Yandhi Jesus Is King	Yes	
"Crack Music 2"	The Game, Kanye West	Intended to be a sequel to "Crack Music" from Late Registration, but failed to make the Game's mixtape due to sample issues.	Gangsta Grillz: Every Movie Needs a Trailer	No	
"Crash Landing"	Kanye West, Sheck Wes, KayCyy	Originally titled "Real Mannish"; Included on the Donda: With Child visual album; Earlier iterations featuring reference vocals by KayCyy and Olskool Ice-Gre of Abstract Mindstate leaked on October 20, 2026	Yandhi God's Country Donda	Yes	
"DJ Khaled's Son"	Kanye West	Recorded in 2018; Produced by Mike Dean; Infamous for its excessive use of slurs	Love Everyone	Yes	
"Everything"	Kanye West	Included on a July 2020 track listing for Donda	God's Country Donda	Yes	
"Fall Out of Heaven"	Kanye West, The-Dream, Justin Vernon	Song re-worked into "Famous" and "FML".	Thank God For Drugs Yeezus 2	Yes	
"Free My Kids"	Kanye West	Written by Dave Blunts.; Leaked in 2025 alongside the other tracks from Cuck.; Initially titled "Money and Fame".	Cuck	Yes	
"God Level"	Kanye West	Produced by Kanye West, Hudson Mohawke, Noah Goldstein, Mike Dean, and 88-Keys.; Debuted through an Adidas commercial during the 2014 FIFA World Cup.	Yeezus 2 So Help Me God	Yes	
"Hold the Line"	Kanye West	Included on a July 2020 track listing for Donda	God's Country Donda	Yes	
"I Feel Terrific"	Kanye West	Written by Kanye West, 88-Keys, Aaron Reid, Ethan Robinson, and Ronny J.; Included on a July 2020 track listing for Donda	God's Country Donda Vultures 1	Yes	
"Jealous/Don't Act Like You Care"	Kanye West, Post Malone, Justin Bieber	Produced by Frank Dukes and Louis Bell; Recorded during 2016-2017	Turbo Grafx 16	Yes	
"Let Go"	Kanye West, Ty Dolla Sign (as ¥$)	Produced by Digital Nas; Teased in April 2025 as a possible lead single to Donda 3; Originally meant for the deluxe edition of Donda	Donda (Deluxe) Vultures 2 Donda 3	Yes	
"Love Love Love"	Kanye West, Ty Dolla Sign (as ¥$)	Included on a track listing for Vultures 1 seen on a shirt worn by North West; Failed to make the album	Vultures 1	Yes	
"Mama's Boyfriend"	Kanye West	Produced by Q-Tip, DJ Premier, Jeff Bhasker, and Anthony Kilhoffer; Samples "Movin' Out (Anthony's Song)" by Billy Joel; Failed to make Good Ass Job or My Beautiful Dark Twisted Fantasy	Good Ass Job My Beautiful Dark Twisted Fantasy (Deluxe)	Yes	
"Matthew"	Kanye West, Ty Dolla Sign (as ¥$), North West	Written by Kanye West and John Beck; Played during a listening event for Vultures 2	Vultures 2	Yes	
"New Body"	Kanye West, Ty Dolla Sign, Nicki Minaj	Produced by Ronny J; Failed to make Yandhi, Jesus Is King, or Vultures 1; Multiple versions in circulation, including versions with alternative verses from each performer.; Iterations/demos have been recorded by Ant Clemons, Desiigner, 6ix9ine, and Mykki Blanco.	Yandhi Jesus Is King God's Country Donda Vultures 1 Vultures 2 Vultures 3	Yes	
"Outside"	Kanye West	Included on the tracklist for Bully posted to X, but didn't make the final album, or the deluxe.	Bully	No	
"Out of My Mind"	Kanye West	Previewed at the Yeezy Season 01 in Los Angeles on November 5th, 2026	TBA	No	
"Pussy Cost Money"	Kanye West, Ty Dolla Sign (as ¥$)	Included in a track listing for Vultures 2 posted to West's Yeezy website.; Failed to make the album.	Vultures 2	No	
"See Me Again"	Kanye West, Bon Iver, Tony Williams, Elly Jackson, John Legend	Erroneously leaked in October 2010 under the name "Never See Me Again"; Failed to make Good Ass Job, My Beautiful Dark Twisted Fantasy, or Donda; Interpolates "I Never Want To See You Again" by Quasi; Speculated by fans to be a suicide note due to the interpolation being mistaken for "Futari Dake no Ceremony" by Yukiko Okada.	Good Ass Job My Beautiful Dark Twisted Fantasy Donda	Yes	
"Skeletons"	Kanye West	Recorded in March 2018; Leaked on June 27, 2022, as a demo track; Failed to make Love Everyone; included on Astroworld (2018) by Travis Scott instead	Love Everyone	Yes	
"Skurrr" (Note: Also written as "Skurrrrrr"; misspelled as "Skmrrr" on the July 2020 track listing.)	Kanye West, KayCyy	Included on a July 2020 track listing for Donda	God's Country Donda	Yes	
"Something in the Orange"	Kanye West	Seen on an early Bully tracklist shared by engineer Josh Schuback on Instagram	Bully	No	
"Through Your Likes"	Kanye West, Shemar Pierre	Previewed at the Yeezy Season 01 in Los Angeles on November 5th, 2026	TBA	Yes	
"Uncle"	Kanye West	Leaked in 2025 alongside the other tracks from Cuck.; Following the leak, West clarified that the song was not intended for the album, stating, “UNCLE is not on CUCK and is not about my wife.”; The song reportedly is about a woman who turns to sex work after experiencing abuse.	Cuck	Yes	
"What I Would Have Said at Virgil's Funeral"	Kanye West, James Blake	Thought to have sampled "Always" by James Blake; Produced by James Blake; Previewed at a party in London	War	Yes	
"With Child"	Kanye West	Also known as "Stay On 'Em / Precious"; Produced by Dem Jointz; Featured on the Donda: With Child visual album; Samples "You're Too Precious" by James Blake	God's Country Donda	Yes	
"Wow"	Kanye West	Featured on a 2001 demo tape; Failed to make The College Dropout; Referenced on the track "Last Call"	The Prerequisite The College Dropout	Yes	
