= Awesome =

Awesome may refer to:

== Music ==
- Awesome (band), a Seattle-based American band
- Awesome (The Temptations album) 2001
- Awesome (Marc Terenzi album), 2005
- "Awesome" (song), an unreleased song by Kanye West
- "Awesome", a song by Veruca Salt from Eight Arms to Hold You
- "Awesome", a song from The Wedding Singer musical
- A'wesome, a Korean EP by Hyuna 2016

== Film and television ==
- Awesome (Chuck) or Devon Woodcomb, a fictional character from the TV series Chuck
- Awesomeness (company), a Los Angeles–based film and television studio
- Awesome TV, a Malaysian television channel

== People ==
- Awesome Kong (born 1977), female American professional wrestler
- Mike Awesome (1965–2007), male American professional wrestler

== Other ==
- Awesome (video game), a 1990 science fiction action game for the Amiga and Atari ST
- Awesome (window manager), a dynamic window manager for the X Window System
- Awesome Comics, an American comic book studio, 1997–2000
- Awesome Foundation, a philanthropic organization
- Awesome Peak, a mountain in Alaska
