= 30 Hours =

Promotional single by Kanye West

from the album The Life of Pablo
- Released: February 12, 2016
- Recorded: December 20, 2012; October 1, 2015 – April 2, 2016
- Genre: Hip hop; R&B
- Length: 5:23 (album version); 4:07 (single version)
- Label: GOOD; Def Jam
- Songwriters: Kanye West; Aubrey Graham; Karriem Riggins; Mike Dean; Arthur Russell; Cornell Haynes; Jason Epperson; Pharrell Williams; Charles L. Brown; Isaac Hayes
- Producers: West; Karriem Riggins; Dean

"30 Hours" is a song by American rapper Kanye West from his seventh studio album, The Life of Pablo (2016). It features backing vocals from André 3000. The track was released as a promotional single from the album as part of West's GOOD Fridays program.

== Composition and lyrics ==
"30 Hours" heavily samples the 1986 track "Answers Me" by Arthur Russell. The song also includes a sample of drums from the 1973 single "Joy" by Isaac Hayes.

The album version has an outro similar to that of "Last Call" from West's debut studio album The College Dropout (2004). By the time that all the changes had been made to The Life of Pablo in June 2016, the track had been crafted by West to sound like the original version.

The song interpolates Nelly singles "E.I." and "Hot in Herre".

== Release ==
Prior to the release of the song, "Real Friends" and "No More Parties in LA" had already been released for streaming as part of the GOOD Fridays program. The track was released as a promotional single just like they were, so West made it solely available for free streaming on SoundCloud instead of sites like iTunes or Amazon Music where it had to be paid for. "30 Hours" went on to be removed from SoundCloud, despite the two promotional singles "Facts" and "No More Parties in LA" still being available on the site.

The Life of Pablo was scheduled to be titled "Waves" at one point and the track was set to be a part of Act 2 on one of the track lists for the album. On the day that the song was released, West announced via Twitter that the featuring album was being mastered and set for release later on in the day, alongside promotion of the single – however, the release was delayed by two days due to Chance the Rapper fighting to keep the track "Waves" as part of it. Two days after The Life of Pablo's release, West tweeted out thanks to Drake for helping him write "30 Hours" along with "Father Stretch My Hands, Pt. 1" and also promised more music with both Drake and Future.

== Recording ==
Photography of background vocalist André 3000 in the studio alongside other rappers with West working on the album was posted on 2 Chainz's Instagram in January 2016. When André was on his way to the studio in Los Angeles, he decided to bring a random Uber passenger with him. André revealed that he was expecting to drop a guest verse on "30 Hours" and that others expected one from him, though the collaboration fell through.

== Critical reception ==
When reviewing The Life of Pablo for Rolling Stone, Rob Sheffield viewed "30 Hours" as "the most stunning track here". Gavin Haynes of NME described West's sampling of "Answers Me" in the track as where "he pulls off the most masterful of these high-low art juxtapositions".

== Commercial performance ==
Upon the release of The Life of Pablo, the song debuted at number 6 on the US Billboard Bubbling Under R&B/Hip-Hop Singles chart and remained on it for a total of two weeks. In the United Kingdom, the song debuted at 143 on the UK singles chart.

== Credits and personnel ==
Credits adapted from West's official website.

- Production – Kanye West, Karriem Riggins & Mike Dean #MWA for Dean's List Productions
- Additional production – Noah Goldstein for Ark Productions, Inc.
- Engineering – Noah Goldstein, Andrew Dawson, Anthony Kilhoffer, Mike Dean & Tom Kahre
- Mix – Manny Marroquin at Larrabee Studios, North Hollywood, CA
- Mix assisted – Chris Galland, Ike Schultz & Jeff Jackson
- Background vocals – André Benjamin
- Vocoder – Mike Dean

== Charts ==
Chart (2016)	Peak position
UK Singles (Official Charts)	143
US Bubbling Under R&B/Hip-Hop Singles (Billboard)	6

== Certifications ==
Region	Certification	Certified units/sales
United States (RIAA)	Gold	500,000^{‡}
^{‡} Sales+streaming figures based on certification alone.
