= GOOD Fridays =

Weekly music release by Kanye West

GOOD Fridays was a weekly free music release by rapper Kanye West, launched in support of his fifth studio album My Beautiful Dark Twisted Fantasy (2010), and again for his seventh studio album The Life of Pablo (2016). The original intention was to release a free new song every Friday for a few months to promote his album, and the weekly tracks generally featured various rappers from his label, GOOD Music, and other artists he usually collaborated with. All of the GOOD Friday tracks come with their own cover art. West initially announced that the free music program releases songs from August 20, 2010, to Christmas 2010. However at the beginning of November, West announced that he was extending GOOD Fridays until the end of January (although this never ended up happening).

15 tracks have been released through the program and three tracks appeared on West's album My Beautiful Dark Twisted Fantasy, those tracks being "Monster", "Devil in a New Dress" (with a new Rick Ross feature), and "So Appalled". Meanwhile, a remix to "Power", a track on the album, was released as the first song in the series, an alternate version of the remix of Justin Bieber's "Runaway Love" (previously a track on his album My World 2.0) was released on Justin Bieber's remix album, Never Say Never: The Remixes, the song "Looking for Trouble" was released as a bonus track on J. Cole's third mixtape, Friday Night Lights, "Christmas in Harlem" was released on streaming services, and "The Joy" would be released much later, as one of the deluxe tracks to Kanye and Jay-Z's collab, Watch the Throne, around a year later.

The program was relaunched in 2016 in support of The Life of Pablo; 3 tracks were released through the relaunch, with all of the tracks ("Real Friends", "No More Parties in LA", and "30 Hours") appearing on the album. West described the series as "an exercise in the power of art."

== Songs ==
=== 2010 ===
Song	Released	Notes	Album
See Me Now (featuring Beyoncé and Charlie Wilson)	August 11th, 2010	Premiered on Hot 97 radio, shortly followed with a free downloadable release on Kanye's website. Samples the song "Think About You" by Brian Russell and Brenda Russell. Later turned into track 14 from the deluxe edition of My Beautiful Dark Twisted Fantasy.	My Beautiful Dark Twisted Fantasy (Deluxe)
"Power" (remix) (featuring Jay-Z and Swizz Beatz)	August 20, 2010	Samples "The Power" by German Eurodance group Snap!.	Non-album single
"Monster" (featuring Jay-Z, Rick Ross, Nicki Minaj, and Bon Iver)	August 27, 2010	Taken off the GOOD Friday website due to being released as an official single. Peaked at position #18 on the Billboard Hot 100.	My Beautiful Dark Twisted Fantasy
"Runaway Love" (remix) (Justin Bieber featuring Kanye West and Raekwon)	August 30, 2010 (Monday)	Is the first song released which features West as a guest collaborator rather than a main guest. Contains a sample of Wu-Tang Clan's "Wu-Tang Clan Ain't Nuthing ta Fuck Wit". Was later released on Never Say Never: The Remixes, which uses the original version's beat.	Never Say Never: The Remixes
"Devil in a New Dress"	September 3, 2010	Shortened version of what appeared on My Beautiful Dark Twisted Fantasy. Produced by Bink!. Album version features Rick Ross.	My Beautiful Dark Twisted Fantasy
"G.O.O.D. Friday" (featuring Common, Pusha T, Kid Cudi, Big Sean, and Charlie Wilson)	September 10, 2010	The title track for the series that featured some of the prominent members of G.O.O.D. Music. Produced by Kanye West.	Non-album single
"Lord Lord Lord" (featuring Mos Def, Swizz Beatz, Raekwon and Charlie Wilson)	September 17, 2010	After the release of this track, Mos Def confirmed his signing with GOOD Music	Non-album single
"So Appalled" (featuring Jay-Z, Pusha T, Cyhi the Prynce, Swizz Beatz, and RZA)	September 24, 2010	The GOOD Friday release of this track is an unmastered version of what later appeared on My Beautiful Dark Twisted Fantasy.	My Beautiful Dark Twisted Fantasy
"Christian Dior Denim Flow" (featuring Kid Cudi, Pusha T, John Legend, Lloyd Banks and Ryan Leslie)	October 1, 2010	Released the week West said he would temporarily suspend the GOOD Friday series. Re-released with an extended verse by Ryan Leslie.	Non-album single
"Don't Stop!" (Child Rebel Soldier)	October 8, 2010	Originally recorded and produced in 2008. Re-released 2 days later with a different mix of the song.	Non-album single
"Take One for the Team" (featuring Keri Hilson, Pusha T, and Cyhi the Prynce)	October 15, 2010	Features keyboards from Mike Dean. Interpolates the songs "All Falls Down" and "Good Life" by Kanye West.	Non-album single
"Don't Look Down" (featuring Mos Def, Lupe Fiasco, and Big Sean)	October 22, 2010	Produced by Swizz Beatz and the Individualz.	Non-album single
"The Joy" (featuring Curtis Mayfield, Charlie Wilson, Pete Rock and Kid Cudi)	October 29, 2010	Produced by Pete Rock and Kanye West. Included as a bonus track on Watch the Throne.	Watch the Throne (Deluxe)
"Looking for Trouble" (featuring Pusha T, Cyhi the Prynce, Big Sean and J. Cole)	November 5, 2010	Also included on the J. Cole mixtape Friday Night Lights as a bonus track.	Friday Night Lights
"Chain Heavy" (featuring Talib Kweli and Consequence)	November 12, 2010	Produced by Q-Tip. Contains a sample of "Swamp Fox - Interlude No. 6" by Albino Gorilla.	Non-album single
"Christmas in Harlem" (featuring Cam'ron, Jim Jones, Vado, Cyhi the Prynce, Pusha T, Musiq Soulchild, Teyana Taylor and Big Sean)	December 17, 2010	Produced by Hit-Boy. Released officially through iTunes on December 17, 2010, with only Teyana Taylor, CyHi the Prynce and West. The final version was released the following week.	Non-album single

=== 2016 ===
Song	Released	Notes	Album
"Real Friends" (featuring Ty Dolla Sign)	January 8, 2016	The single and the return of the program were announced by Kim Kardashian via Twitter. Released officially through SoundCloud on January 8, 2016.	The Life of Pablo
"No More Parties in LA" (featuring Kendrick Lamar)	January 18, 2016	Produced by Madlib. Initially scheduled for release on January 15, the single was officially released 3 days later through SoundCloud on January 18, 2016.	The Life of Pablo
"30 Hours" (featuring André 3000)	February 12, 2016	Released officially through SoundCloud on February 12, 2016; the song was later removed from the platform.	The Life of Pablo
