= The Joy (song) =

Promotional single by Jay-Z and Kanye West featuring Curtis Mayfield

from the album Watch The Throne (Deluxe)
- Released: October 29, 2010
- Recorded: 1997; July 2010 – October 2010
- Studio: Avex (Honolulu)
- Genre: Hip-hop
- Length: 5:16
- Label: Roc-A-Fella; Def Jam
- Songwriters: Curtis Mayfield; John Cameron; John Zachery; Kanye West; Pete Phillips; Scott Mescudi; Shawn Carter
- Producers: Kanye West; Pete Rock

"The Joy" is a song by American rappers Jay-Z and Kanye West, released on October 29, 2010. The song posthumously features singer-songwriter Curtis Mayfield due to samples of his work and voice being used. It was originally released as part of West's GOOD Fridays initiative, a weekly free music giveaway started by the rapper to promote the album My Beautiful Dark Twisted Fantasy (2010); it was later re-released as a track on the deluxe edition of Jay-Z and West's collaborative album, Watch the Throne (2011).

The song features additional vocals from producer Pete Rock and American singers Kid Cudi and Charlie Wilson. Along with Curtis Mayfield, the song also makes use of samples from "Different Strokes" by Syl Johnson; the latter sued West and Jay-Z in October 2011 for their usage of his song, as they had failed to properly clear it in preparation for its monetized release.

Lyrically, the song explores multiple different themes, such as nostalgia, abortion, and the regret associated with both. Despite the heavy subject matter, the song itself is generally laid back in tone, being described as "smooth" by critics. Rock produced the song along with West, with additional production being provided by Mike Dean and Jeff Bhasker.

Though some critics criticized West's verses, the song received generally positive reviews, especially in regards to the production done by Pete Rock, which many used to draw comparisons to earlier songs by both artists. Jay-Z's verse in particular is often complimented in reviews for the song.

== Background ==
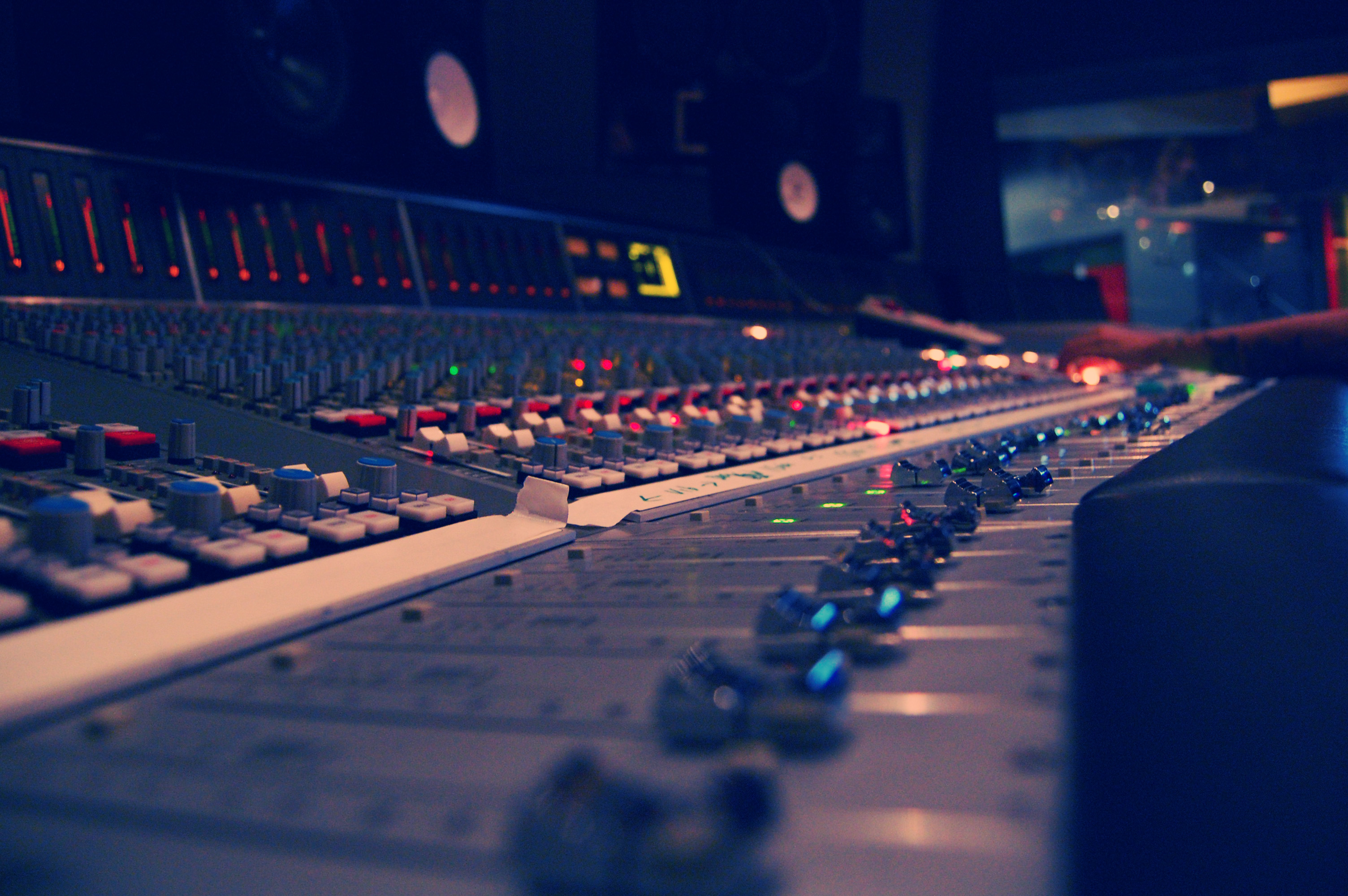
The track was recorded at Avex in Honolulu, Hawaii during sessions for West's album My Beautiful Dark Twisted Fantasy

"The Joy" was originally conceived during sessions for West's fifth studio album, My Beautiful Dark Twisted Fantasy, appearing on a leaked track listing of the album from July 2010. It was later meant to be a bonus track for the album, but was cut due to sample clearance issues. Its placement as a bonus track on Watch the Throne was announced prior to the album's release, as were the rest of the deluxe songs.

Pete Rock, who produced for the song, was unaware of Jay-Z's presence on the track until being played his verse by engineer Young Guru. Rock was shocked to learn that Jay-Z had a verse, as they had yet to release any music together in the years they had been associates; he was particularly flattered by Jay-Z's "Pete Rock let the needle drop" line.

== Composition ==
Musically. "The Joy" is a warm hip-hop track with heavy use of soul sampling, a style West is heavily associated with. Laid-back in tone, it is significantly less bombastic than most of the GOOD Fridays output. In his first verse, West describes an encounter with a woman which resulted in her pregnancy, ultimately causing her to get an abortion. However, he still feels their presence in his life, tying into the sample of Curtis Mayfield singing "the joy of children laughing around you." In his second verse, West notes the throwback nature of the songs production, but mainly commentates on his critics and those who doubt his success. The songs third verse, done by Jay-Z, focuses on his childhood, rapping about his neighborhood with a mixture of fondness and regret.

== Release and reception ==
"The Joy" was first released as the 12th promotional single of West's GOOD Fridays series on October 29, 2010. Like all of the cover art for GOOD Fridays, the cover art was directed by designer Virgil Abloh. "The Joy" was later included as the 16th and final track on the deluxe edition of West and Jay-Z's collaborative album, Watch the Throne, on August 8, 2011.

=== Critical response ===
Reviewing the GOOD Fridays release, Pitchfork's Ryan Dombal criticized the hypocrisy of West's lyrics, stating "'no electro, no metro, a little retro, ah perfecto' sounds a little revisionist from the guy who sampled Daft Punk, made "Flashing Lights" a hit, and sports tailored suits in bed." However, he compliments Rock's production, as when considering the three artists status' in hip-hop, "such hypocritical back-peddling slides under easy just because the lineage is so pure." He ends his review on a positive note, saying the song "is a unique throwback. It flattens time, flows endless." The Guardian writer Alex Peditris had a similar reaction to the songs lyrics; "There's a lovely, warm moment on 'The Joy' when an old Curtis Mayfield sample plays and [Jay-Z] notes, almost as an aside: 'This is my mama's shit, I used to hear it through the walls in the 'hood.' West, meanwhile, is still moaning about South Park taking the mick out of him and struggling with some laboured wordplay." Amrit Singh of Stereogum saw the track as proof that Jay-Z "[is] back in fighting shape herein."

Red Bull ranked the track 17th on their list of the 20 best Jay-Z songs, with writer Drew Millard find that the track "was an event in the same way that a long-overdue reunion with a family member is an event." He emphasized the differences between West and Jay-Z's lyrics, as "while Kanye's verse oscillates between goofy sex jokes and self-empowerment aphorisms, Jay treats Rock’s Curtis Mayfield flip with reverence, rapping about his childhood with a mix of nostalgia and regret." Writer Kemet High included it on XXL's list of the most essential collaborations between Jay-Z and West. Rose Lilah of HotNewHipHop listed the track on their list of the top 5 best songs from West's GOOD Fridays series, writing that "The Joy" was "one of the most oh-so-soulful records" from the collection of singles, adding that in contrast to the typical "fun-loving, banger-type sound" of GOOD Fridays tracks, "'The Joy' is a smooth, laid-back offering". "The Joy" placed third on Complex's list of the best songs from Watch the Throne. In a separate list for Complex, staff chose it as West's 23rd best verse of all time, comparing his first verse to the poem the mother by Gwendolyn Brooks.

== Lawsuit ==
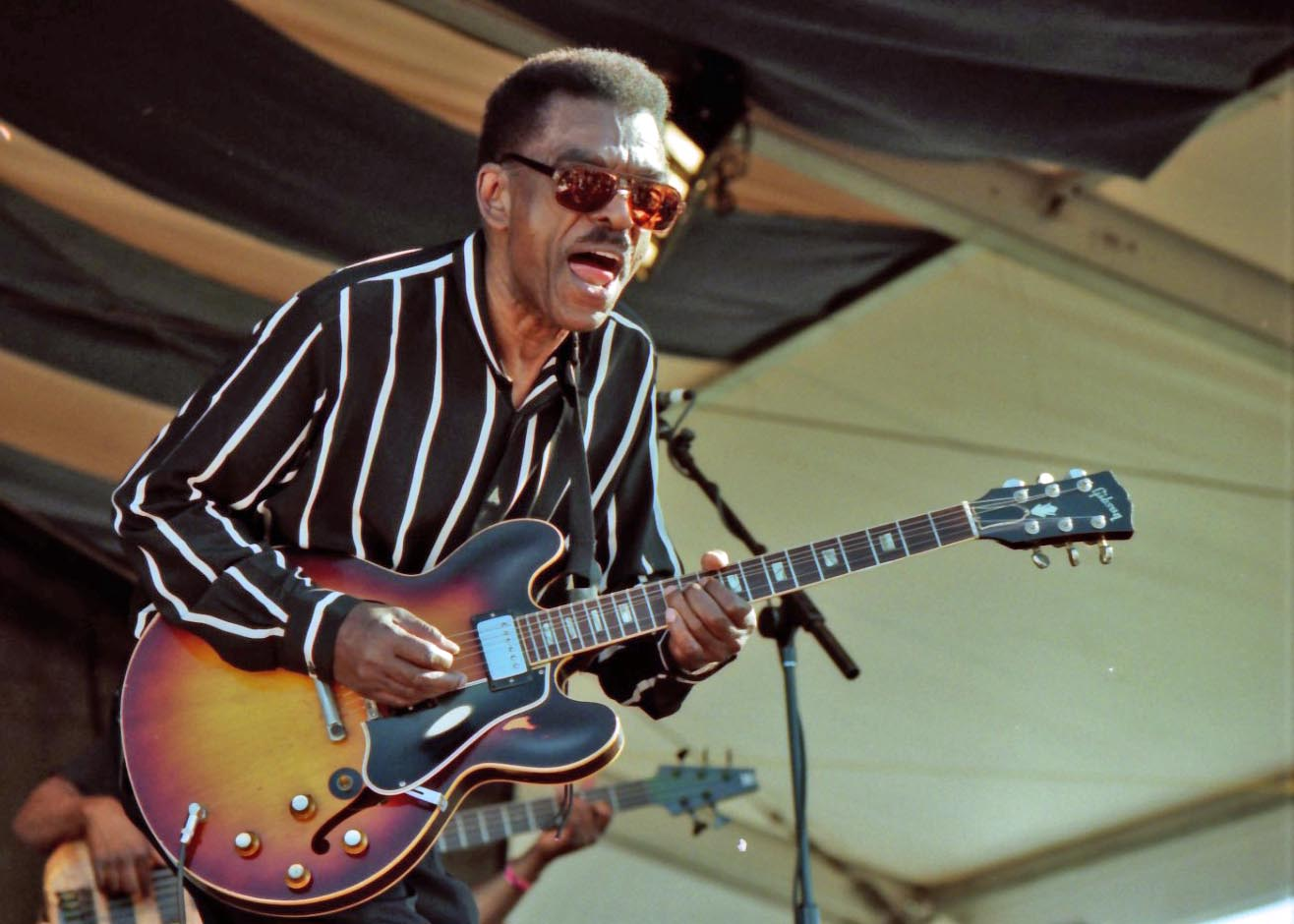
Syl Johnson, whose song "Different Strokes" is used for the song's signature grunts, was not properly credited when it released

On October 2011, Syl Johnson sued Jay-Z and West, alleging that he was not properly credited and compensated for the tracks usage of his song "Different Strokes". Johnson had previously sued over uncleared samples, including a $29 million lawsuit against Cypress Hill, which was dismissed in 2008 on technicality of the songs copyright status. Johnson's distribution label Numero Group stated that he was "nearly in tears" after finding out the song was on Watch the Throne, having previously removed it from multiple monetized websites. Numero Group had previously attempted to clear the song when it was a bonus track on My Beautiful Dark Twisted Fantasy, stating that three weeks before the album was set to release, they received an email requesting its immediately clearance. "After a little negotiating, we came to a price and a verbal agreement. (...) Paperwork to confirm all of this was to arrive for counter signature. Weeks passed. Then months. No deluxe version appeared in the market place". Numero Group repeatedly attempted to contact the business affairs department of Def Jam regarding the absence of "The Joy", but were unable to get a hold of them.

Rock, the tracks main producer, clarified he was not responsible for the sampling of "Different Strokes", posting to Twitter: "Just to clear the air about WTT, i never sampled that syl johnson record,if u sample syl u gotta show him sum respect and clear the sample."

The lawsuit was settled in May 2012 for an undisclosed amount of money.

== Credits and personnel ==
Credits are adapted from the album's liner notes.

=== Recording ===
- Recorded at Avex (Honolulu)

=== Personnel ===
- Kanye West – songwriter, production
- Jay-Z – songwriter
- Curtis Mayfield – songwriter
- John Cameron – songwriter
- John Zachary – songwriter
- Kid Cudi – songwriter, additional vocals
- Pete Rock – songwriter, production, additional vocals
- Mike Dean – keyboards, bass, additional production, mixing engineer
- Jeff Bhasker – additional production
- Charlie Wilson – additional vocals
- Anthony Kilhoffer – recording engineer
- Gaylord Holomalia – assistant engineer
- Christian Mochizuki – assistant engineer
