= Christian Dior Denim Flow =

2010 promotional single by Kanye West

Promotional single by Kanye West featuring Kid Cudi, Pusha T, John Legend, Lloyd Banks, and Ryan Leslie
- Released: October 1, 2010
- Genre: Alternative hip-hop
- Length: 7:03 (October 3 update); 6:50 (original version)
- Songwriters: Christopher Lloyd; Ryan Leslie; John Stephens; Scott Mescudi; Kanye West; Terrence Thornton
- Producers: Kanye West; Mike Dean; Ryan Leslie

"Christian Dior Denim Flow" is a song by American rapper Kanye West. The track features prominent vocals from singer Kid Cudi alongside secondary vocals from musicians Pusha T, John Legend, Lloyd Banks, and Ryan Leslie. It is an alternative hip-hop song, featuring production from West, Mike Dean, and Leslie. Dean also provides a guitar solo. The song was released as part of West's free music giveaway series, GOOD Fridays, on October 1, 2010, before being updated just two days later.

== Background and recording ==
The track was recorded in 2010 during sessions with various GOOD Music signees. In an interview with Vibe, Ryan Leslie recounted the shared studio environment in which the song was created. He described how he joined Kanye West, among other contributors, during the GOOD Fridays sessions and participated in the development of the track. According to Pusha T's manager, Steven Victor, several public figures attended a particular session for the song, including comedian Chris Rock and magician David Blaine. Blaine reportedly performed magic tricks for the crew while West was producing. Victor stated that "he was doing all types of wild magic".

=== Release ===
The song was later not set to release due to West's intent on ending the GOOD Fridays series. This came after multiple songs from his then-upcoming album My Beautiful Dark Twisted Fantasy began leaking online. However, he ultimately resumed the series and issued "Christian Dior Denim Flow" as that week's release. Two days after the original release, the song was reissued, now with an extra 13 seconds of length. This updated edition features different vocal effects and an extended Ryan Leslie verse.

== Composition and theme ==
The track features two drum samples from Blowfly's 1973 song, "Living Together Is Keeping Us Apart" and Outkast's 1993 song "Player's Ball (Extended Version)" . Musically, it's built around layered production, with a leading guitar entering after Cudi's hook and transitioning into Ryan Leslie's verse. The hook features group vocals, with Kid Cudi delivering the melody and John Legend providing additional backing vocals. The verses are done by West, Pusha T, Ryan Leslie, Lloyd Banks, and Cudi, with West also supplying a bridge.

"Christian Dior Denim Flow" has a theme revolving around high fashion and model culture. Kanye references various models in the song, specifically, Arlenis Sosa, Selita Ebanks, Jourdan Dunn, Joan Smalls, Jessica Gomes, Jessica Stam, Bar Refaeli, Esti Ginzburg, Coco Rocha, Kate Moss, Alessandra Ambrosio, Anja Rubik, Olga Kurylenko, Abbey Lee Kershaw, Irina Shayk, and Doutzen Kroes.

== Critical reception ==
"Christian Dior Denim Flow" received positive reviews from critics. Writer Alex Zidel stated on HotNewHipHop that the song holds up as one of Kanye West's best songs of all time, praising its memorability, lyrical themes, guest vocals, and overall quality. Additionally, Complex listed it as the number 1 best song from West's GOOD Fridays release series.
