= See Me Now =

Promotional single by Kanye West featuring Beyoncé, Charlie Wilson and Big Sean

from the album My Beautiful Dark Twisted Fantasy
- Released: August 11, 2010
- Recorded: 2010
- Genre: Hip hop
- Length: 6:04
- Label: Roc-A-Fella; Def Jam
- Songwriters: Brenda Russell; Brian Russell; No I.D.; Beyoncé Knowles; Kanye West
- Producers: Kanye West; Lex Luger; No I.D.

30 second sample showing Beyoncé and West's initial verses.

"See Me Now" is a song by American rapper Kanye West featuring R&B singers Beyoncé and Charlie Wilson. The album version includes a verse by Big Sean and is included on West's fifth studio album My Beautiful Dark Twisted Fantasy (2010) as an iTunes Store bonus track. It was written by West, Knowles, Wilson and Sean, while production was handled by West, Lex Luger and No I.D.

"See Me Now" received generally positive reviews from music critics. The song peaked at number two on the US Billboard Bubbling Under R&B/Hip-Hop Singles chart in 2010 and appeared at number 160 on the 2011 year-end South Korean Gaon Chart.

== Background and composition ==
"See Me Now" was produced by West, Lex Luger and No I.D. Southside was in the studio during Luger's production work on the song, which led to him being involved with West's 2011 Jay-Z collaboration "Illest Motherfucker Alive". It premiered on August 11, 2010. The song was also available on West's website, also on the same day, for a free digital download. The album version has an additional verse by Big Sean and is included on My Beautiful Dark Twisted Fantasy as an iTunes bonus track. Knowles recorded her vocals for the song at 5am.

During the bridge of the song, Knowles sings the lines, "I know one thing, my momma would be proud/And you see me looking up cause I know she's looking down right now". During the hook Wilson sings the lines "I know you see me now right now, I know you see me now right now" with a "deep" tenor.

== Critical reception ==
Professional ratings
Review scores
Source	Rating
Rolling Stone	3.5/5 stars

Christian Hoard of the Rolling Stone gave the song a rating of three and a half out of five stars, writing in his review of the song: "'I'm Socrates, but my skin more chocolaty,' shouts Kanye, who goes on to detail several feats of attention-whore behavior—cruising in Ferraris, rocking fur coats, walking into high-end restaurants with no shoes on. But the sound is remarkably warm, a gospel-style mix of heartfelt crooning (from Beyoncé and... Charlie Wilson) and plush accompaniment that's perfect for worshipping at the altar of Yeezy."

== Chart performance ==
"See Me Now" debuted and peaked at number two on the US Billboard Bubbling Under R&B/Hip-Hop Singles chart on August 28, 2010. It appeared at number 160 on the year-end South Korean Gaon Chart for 2011.

== Charts ==
=== Weekly charts ===
Chart (2010)	Peak position
US Billboard Bubbling Under R&B/Hip-Hop Singles	2

=== Year-end charts ===
Chart (2011)	Position
South Korea Gaon International Chart	160
