= Awesome (song) =

Unreleased song by Kanye West

Song by Kanye West
- Written: 2011
- Recorded: 2011–2014
- Genre: Alternative R&B; ballad
- Length: 4:35
- Songwriters: Kanye West; Chauncey Hollis Jr.; Jeffrey Lee Johnson; Michael Dean
- Producers: Hit-Boy; Mike Dean

"Awesome" is an unreleased song by American rapper Kanye West. It was recorded between 2011 and 2014 during sessions for multiple projects, including Watch the Throne (2011) and Yeezus (2013). West wrote the song with Roscoe Dash, Hit-Boy, and Mike Dean, with the latter two producing the track. Composed of synthesized horns, "Awesome" is a ballad dedicated to West's then-partner, American media personality Kim Kardashian, with West singing about the various ways he finds her "awesome". Later versions of the song feature backing vocals from American singer Charlie Wilson.

West debuted "Awesome" during his performance at the 2013 Met Gala, where he performed it alongside several songs from Yeezus. West played it at several other events from 2013–2014, and the song's studio recording was later previewed during an episode of Keeping Up with the Kardashians. In March 2015, it leaked online.

"Awesome" received generally negative reviews from music critics, with many split on West's lyricism and vocal performance. Some reviewers found his lyrics romantic, considering them a charming expression of love, while most criticized them as cheesy and panned West's use of AutoTune.

== Background and recording ==
West originally recorded "Awesome" in 2011, during sessions for he and Jay-Z's collaborative studio album, Watch the Throne (2011). In April 2012, West began dating reality television star Kim Kardashian, with whom he had already been long-time friends. West and Kardashian became engaged in October 2013, and married at Fort di Belvedere in Florence in May 2014. Their private ceremony was subject to widespread mainstream coverage, with which West took issue.

West first premiered "Awesome" live at the 2013 Met Gala alongside tracks from his then-upcoming album Yeezus (2013), though it ended up not appearing on the album after its release. Two snippets of the song were later featured in the 2014 Keeping Up with the Kardashians wedding episode documenting West and Kardashian's marriage. In the episode, it was revealed that West was excited to share "Awesome" with Kardashian when they were at a studio session. "Awesome" leaked online in March 2015, with West's frequent co-writer Malik Yusef alleging via Twitter that the song leaked due to West's laptop being stolen, which was likely while he was visiting Paris for Paris Fashion Week. Due to Yusef's post gaining traction, Def Jam issued a statement regarding both subjects, stating that West's laptop was still in his possession and that "Awesome" leaking online "was unrelated and completely coincidental." Two alternate versions of the song leaked online in October 2022.

== Composition and lyrics ==
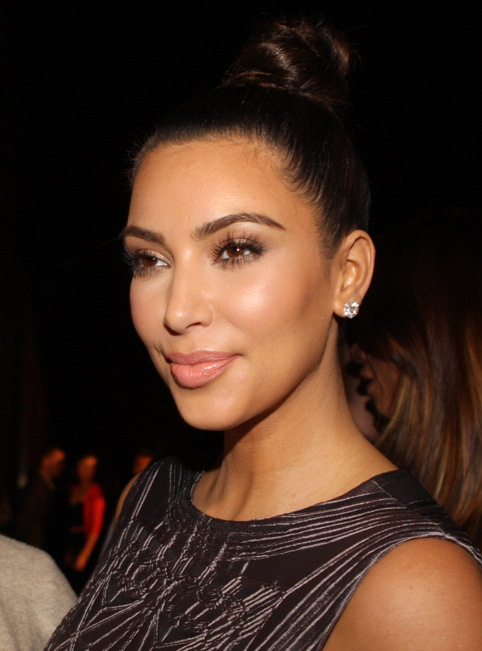
West wrote "Awesome" about his then-girlfriend, Kim Kardashian (pictured).

"Awesome" is an alternative R&B love ballad built around a slow melody, compared to those of the Halloween and Disney movies, and AutoTuned vocals from West. The song introduces itself with synthesized horn instruments, giving off a dramatic feeling. Lyrically, the song serves as a romantic tribute to his ex-wife Kim Kardashian, with West describing her as "awesome" while reflecting on their relationship. Near the end of the track, West states that he is "also awesome," shifting the song's focus from praising Kardashian to expressing confidence in himself. Later versions include backing vocals from American singer Charlie Wilson.

== Live performances ==
West debuted "Awesome" on May 6, 2013, during the Met Gala at the Metropolitan Museum of Art in New York City. The performance occurred shortly before the release of Yeezus and marked the song's first public appearance. West performed the song alongside several other then-unreleased tracks, including "I Am a God." Later that month, he performed "Awesome" again during his surprise appearances at Adult Swim's Upfront Event at the Roseland Ballroom in New York.

== Critical reception ==
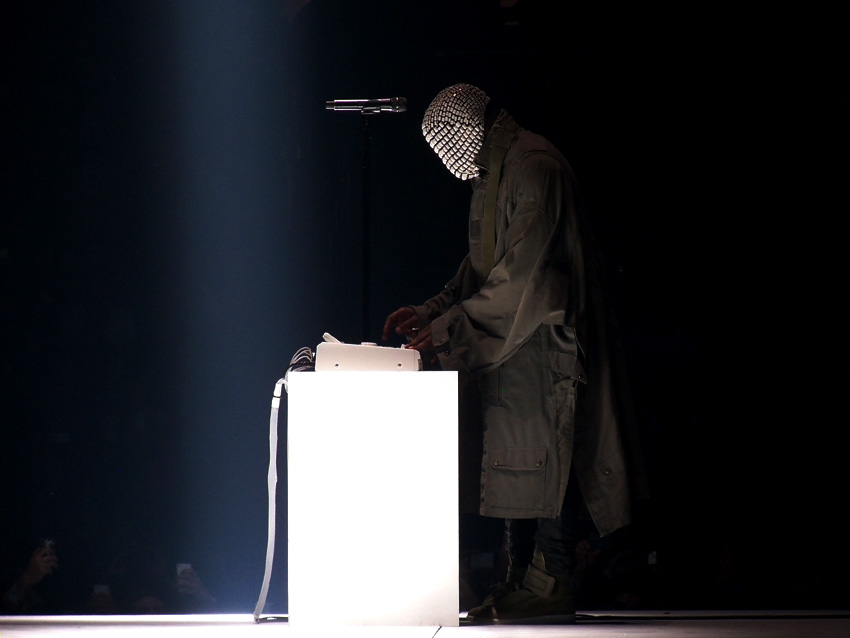
West's performance of "Awesome" divided critics, with many finding his lyrics and use of AutoTune to be unintentionally comical.

"Awesome" received generally negative reviews from music critics after it leaked, with many panning West's lyricism and usage of AutoTune. Chris DeVille of Stereogum said he "wouldn't describe it as awesome" and hoped it would not be on So Help Me God. Stuff's Nick Galvin called the song "the worst thing you'll hear today", describing it as "bizarrely corny" and comparing West's AutoTuned vocals to Stephen Hawking's speech-generating device. At VH1, Jordan Runtagh called its lyrics "hilariously heartfelt", expecting "no less from the man who brought us 'Perfect Bitch,'" another song West wrote about Kardashian in 2012.

"Awesome" was also negatively received by social media users, with Billboard's Lars Brandle noting that their criticisms "would suggest the recording is anything but awesome." Brandle himself disliked the song, stating that West "doesn't do himself any favors with a hatful of corny lyrics, and the vocals are so over-produced, all traces of Ye have been stripped out."

A few reviewers were more favorable towards the song. Rose Lilah of HotNewHipHop rated "Awesome" as "Very Hot" on the website's rating scale, writing that, "if Kanye hadn't already made his undying love for Kimmy Cakes known, it's definitely clear here." Okayplayer's Michael Gonik found it to be "a nice change of pace" from West's newly released single "All Day", opining that those who "haven't already agonized over West's relentless auto-tuning" will find the song to be "ear candy". In a retrospective review for Pitchfork, Matthew Schnipper acknowledged that most critics found the song to be "a big piece of garbage", although he personally liked how it "isn't trying to do anything other than prove the depth of West's love". Schnipper characterized the song as "charming, egotistical, odd, and actually kind of stupid—but it's that unadorned clarity of vision that makes 'Awesome' such a successful love anthem."

== Credits and personnel ==
Credits adapted from ASCAP.

- Kanye West – performer, songwriter
- Hit-Boy – songwriter, producer
- Mike Dean – songwriter, producer
- Jeffrey Lee Johnson (Roscoe Dash) – songwriter
