= Real Friends (Kanye West song) =

Promotional single by Kanye West

from the album The Life of Pablo
- Released: January 8, 2016
- Recorded: 2015
- Genre: Alternative hip hop; cloud rap
- Length: 4:11
- Label: GOOD; Def Jam
- Songwriters: West; Mike Dean; Adam Feeney; Tyrone Griffin Jr.; Jalil Hutchens; Darren King; Kejuan Muchita; Glenda Proby; Matthew Samuels; Lawrence Smith; Cydel Young; Rupert Thomas Jr.
- Producers: Boi-1da; Frank Dukes; Havoc; West; Sevn Thomas; King; Noah Goldstein; Dean

Audio sample
- file; help

"Real Friends" is a song by American rapper Kanye West, featuring vocals from American singer Ty Dolla Sign. It was released as a promotional single from West's seventh studio album, The Life of Pablo, on January 8, 2016, The song includes West rapping about his trust issues around friends and family, with Whodini's song "Friends" being directly recalled.

== Song ==
The song directly recalls the 1980s track "Friends" by hip hop group Whodini. West's lyrical content when rapping in the track is centered around the rapper's relationships with his friends and family. The lyrics: "I had a cousin that stole my laptop that I was fuckin' bitches on/Paid that nigga 250 thousand just to get it from him" were referenced by West in his Kendrick Lamar-featuring promotional single "No More Parties in LA" with the lines: "And as far as real friends, tell my cousins I love 'em/Even the one that stole the laptop, you dirty motherfucker". The song also directly borrows from Frank Dukes’ "Couches"; the sample is looped to create the instrumental track.

== Release ==
On January 8, 2016, Kim Kardashian, West's wife, announced via Twitter the release of "Real Friends", The Life of Pablo's actual first single, will initiate the return of West's GOOD Fridays program. West has previously done a weekly free music giveaway leading up to the release of his fifth studio album, My Beautiful Dark Twisted Fantasy in 2010. "Real Friends" was released the day it was announced via SoundCloud simultaneously with the album's (then titled Swish) release date and a snippet of the forthcoming GOOD Friday release, titled "No More Parties in LA", which features guest vocals from Kendrick Lamar.

== Recording ==
In March 2016, Swizz Beatz revealed via Instagram that DMX was recording his feature for a remix of "Real Friends". Joey Badass made the claim in January 2018 that he spoke to West at Coachella 2016, where West apparently told him that he inspired him to make the song.

== Critical reception ==
"Real Friends" received universal acclaim from music critics. At Pitchfork, Jonah Bromwich awarded the song the "Best New Track" tag, labeling it as "heavy, grizzled, and sad" and complimenting its production and lyrical content. Adelle Platon of Billboard called the song's beat "dreamy", and commented on the lyrical content by writing that Kanye "waxes poetic about trust issues and reflects on how he could be a better BFF and family man."

Pitchfork listed "Real Friends" on their ranking of the 100 best songs of 2016 at number 14. Red Bull named it the second best song of 2016. Genius listed the song as the thirteenth best song of 2016. Crack Magazine placed it fifth in their end of year best songs of the year list.

== Remixes ==
In January 2016, singer Erykah Badu released a remix of the track titled "Trill Friends" which was named "Best New Track" by Pitchfork. Rapper Waka Flocka Flame also released his own remix version of the song in April 2016. A minute-long verse by DMX surfaced online in December 2017 whilst he was in jail that was supposed to be on a remix by West featuring him that never was released due to DMX's legal issues.

== Commercial performance ==
"Real Friends" debuted at number 92 on the US Billboard Hot 100 upon the release of The Life of Pablo. It also charted at number 34 on the US Hot R&B/Hip-Hop Songs chart in the same week and stayed on the chart for a total of two weeks. The song performed best in the United Kingdom, reaching number 78 on the UK Singles Chart.

== Credits and personnel ==
Credits adapted from West's official website.

- Vocals – Ty Dolla Sign
- Keyboards – Mike Dean
- Production – Kanye West and Boi-1da
- Co-produced – Frank Dukes and Havoc
- Additional production – Darren King, Dean, Noah Goldstein and Sevn Thomas
- Engineering – Goldstein and Ty Dolla Sign
- Mix – Manny Marroquin at Larrabee Studios, North Hollywood, California
- Mix assisted – Chris Galland, Ike Schultz and Jeff Jackson

== Charts ==
| Chart (2016) | Peak position |
|---|---|
| Sweden Heatseeker (Sverigetopplistan) | 8 |
| UK Singles (Official Charts) | 78 |
| UK Hip Hop/R&B (Official Charts) | 21 |
| US Billboard Hot 100 | 92 |
| US Hot R&B/Hip-Hop Songs (Billboard) | 34 |

== Certifications ==
| Region | Certification | Certified units/sales |
|---|---|---|
| New Zealand (RMNZ) | Gold | 15,000^{‡} |
| United Kingdom (BPI) | Silver | 200,000^{‡} |
| United States (RIAA) | Platinum | 1,000,000^{‡} |
^{‡} Sales+streaming figures based on certification alone.
