= No More Parties in LA =

Promotional single by Kanye West featuring Kendrick Lamar

from the album The Life of Pablo
- Released: January 18, 2016
- Recorded: 2009–2016
- Genre: Hip-hop
- Length: 6:14
- Label: GOOD; Def Jam
- Songwriters: Kanye West; Otis Jackson Jr.; Kendrick Duckworth; John Watson; Walter Morrison; Herbert Rooney; Ronald Bean; Highleigh Crizoe; Dennis Coles; Larry Graham; Tina Graham; Sam Dees; Malik Jones
- Producers: Madlib; Kanye West

Audio sample
- file; help

"No More Parties in LA" (sometimes called "No More Parties in L.A.") is a song by American rapper Kanye West from his seventh studio album, The Life of Pablo (2016), featuring vocals from fellow rapper Kendrick Lamar. It was produced by West and Madlib, who began the recording in 2010. The beat was originally offered to Freddie Gibbs before being given to West and Lamar by Madlib. The song was released as the third promotional single from the album as part of West's GOOD Fridays series on January 18, 2016.

A hip-hop track, the song heavily samples Walter "Junie" Morrison's "Suzie Thundertussy". It also includes samples of Johnny "Guitar" Watson's "Give Me My Love", Larry Graham's "Stand Up and Shout About Love", and Ghostface Killah's "Mighty Healthy". In the lyrics, West reflects on Hollywood culture and the experience of fame, while Lamar recounts the beginning of a relationship. "No More Parties in LA" received universal acclaim from music critics, many of whom lauded West's verse. They often appreciated his lyricism and others complimented Lamar's verse, while a few reviewers highlighted the song's sampling. Reappraisal towards it in reviews of The Life of Pablo was also positive; critics generally praised the production.

"No More Parties in LA" was ranked as one of the best tracks of 2016 by multiple publications, including HipHopDX and Pitchfork. The song charted at number 3 and 39 on the US Billboard Bubbling Under R&B/Hip-Hop Singles chart and UK R&B Chart, respectively. It was certified gold in the United States by the Recording Industry Association of America (RIAA) in August 2018, and later platinum in May 2022. Yasiin Bey referenced the song with his freestyle "No More Parties in SA" in January 2016. A remix of the song was shared by Freddie Gibbs that same month, while Sporting Life later released his remix in February 2017.

== Background and development ==
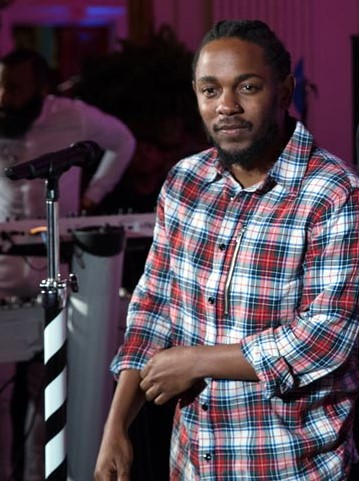
The song features vocals from Kendrick Lamar.

From 2013 to 2014, Kendrick Lamar supported West on The Yeezus Tour. He co-wrote West's single "All Day", which was released in March 2015. "No More Parties in LA" marked the first ever collaboration between Lamar and West. On February 16, 2016, shortly after the release of The Life of Pablo, West revealed that they have 40 unreleased songs together. He continued, stating that he and fellow rapper Young Thug also having 40 songs amounted to a "40/40 club!!!"

In 2010, West launched his weekly free music series GOOD Fridays for his fifth studio album My Beautiful Dark Twisted Fantasy, which was released that same year. For the album's series, 15 tracks were released. "Real Friends" was released as a promotional single on January 8, 2016, launching the return of West's GOOD Fridays series for his then-upcoming album SWISH. (Note: SWISH was eventually retitled to The Life of Pablo.) At the end of the song, a snippet of "No More Parties in LA" was included. The track was later released as part of the series.

The song samples American bassist Larry Graham's "Stand Up and Shout About Love", resulting in him, Tina Graham, and Sam Dees receiving writing credits on "No More Parties in LA". By using Larry Graham's recording, West had sampled the music of Canadian rapper Drake's uncle. Drake responded by uploading a photo to his Instagram that showed a vinyl copy of the recording's parent album One in a Million You (1980). In reference to the track, the rapper captioned the photo: "FEW MORE PARTIES IN LA." "No More Parties in LA" also samples American rapper Ghostface Killah's "Mighty Healthy", for which the rapper, Herb Rooney, Mathematics, and Highleigh Crizoe received writing credits. The sample marked the second time that West had sampled the recording, with the first being on his single "New God Flow" in 2012.

== Recording ==
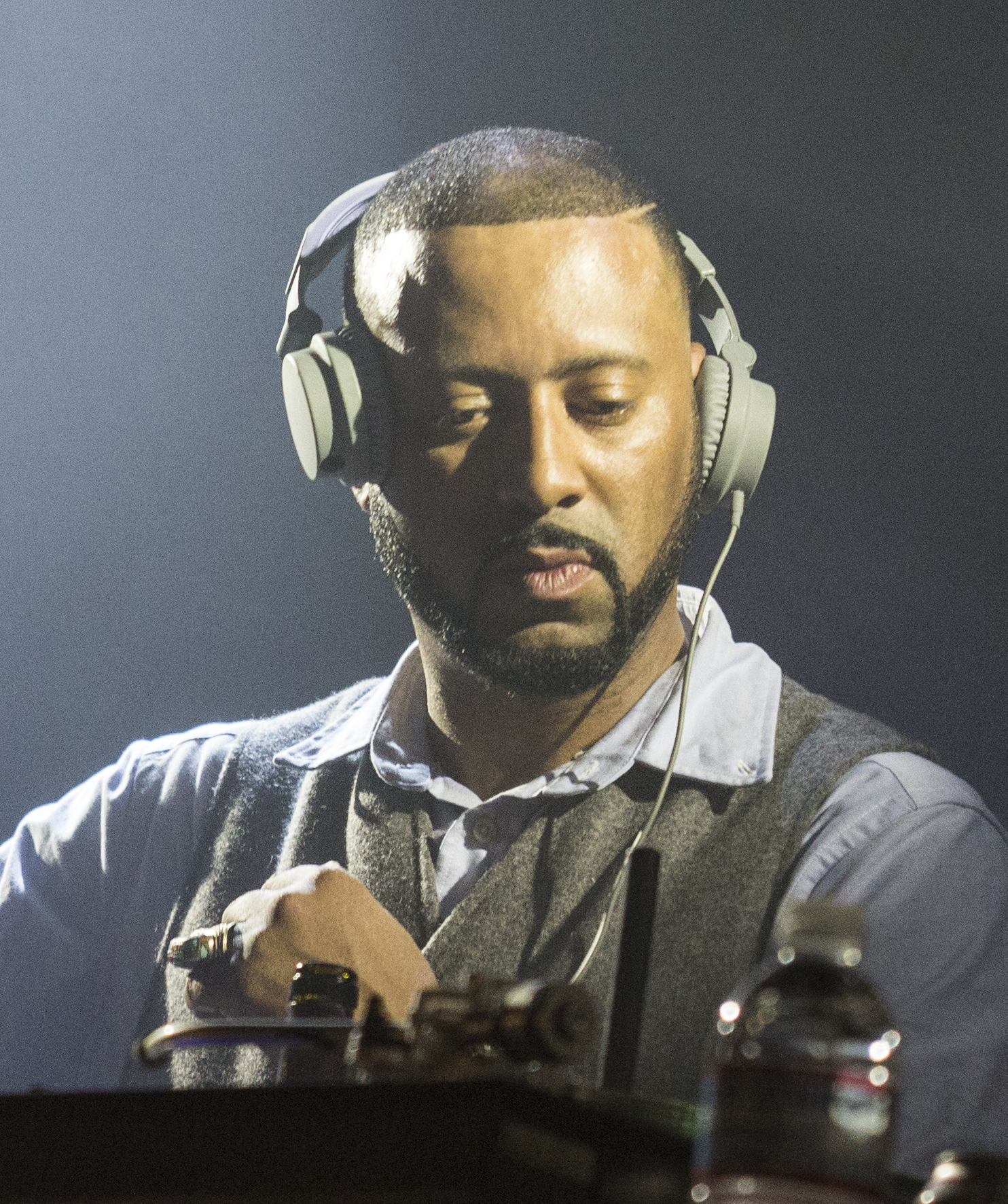
The song was produced by West and Madlib, who made the beat on his iPad and was responsible for the main backdrop, whereas the rapper crafted its intro.

West and American musician Madlib began production on the song in 2010, starting to record it during the sessions for My Beautiful Dark Twisted Fantasy, then known as Good Ass Job. In 2010, Madlib told LA Weekly he had given five beats to West. As part of a special featurette included on the DVD version of 2014 Stones Throw Records documentary Our Vinyl Weighs a Ton, West rapped lyrics that were later used for "No More Parties in LA". He originally performed the lyrics when working with Madlib, whom West spoke about collaborating with during the featurette. He recalled: "I could paint the scene of how I felt sitting there with Madlib, working on these tracks, and just hearing the textures." After West recounted collaborating with him, he said that he "might have to get some more Madlib beats for the next projects".

Explaining the contributions to the song's production with a tweet, West confirmed he put together the intro while Madlib crafted the main backdrop. West's wife Kim Kardashian revealed via Twitter that he had arrived at the studio in Italy and finished recording the track one day prior to its release, admitting her husband wrote 90 of the lines on the plane there. He worked on the final mix with record producer Noah Goldstein in the studio, who engineered the track. During an interview with the Red Bull Music Academy on May 23, 2016, Madlib revealed that he made the beat to the song on an iPad. Madlib also mentioned that when sampling a recording by a musician, he will look through the entirety of its parent album to find samples. He also admitted West "waited too long" due to various samples being ultimately used for Madlib and rapper Freddie Gibbs' second collaborative studio album Bandana (2019). However, Freddie Gibbs told Peter Rosenberg in July 2019 that the song's beat was originally intended for him but West and Lamar "just got on it before I did", after Madlib sent them the beat. Madlib explained to him that he gave around 100 beats to the two of them and they "rapped over a bunch of stuff", though the song was the only one West and Lamar decided to release.

== Composition and lyrics ==
Musically, "No More Parties in LA" is a hip-hop track, with soul elements. It was described as reminiscent of West's earlier works by numerous music journalists. According to Mojo's Bauer Xcel, the song features an abstract beat. The song is heavily based around samples of "Suzie Thundertussy", written and performed by Walter "Junie" Morrison. As well as being sampled in the song's production, the recording is utilized for vocal samples. The recording is combined with samples of the lyrics "Shake that body / Party that body" from an a capella version of "Mighty Healthy", written by Rooney, Mathematics, Crizoe, and its performer Ghostface Killah. For the song's intro, samples are used of "la-dee-da-das" from "Give Me My Love" (1977), written and performed by Johnny "Guitar" Watson. Samples of vocals from "Stand Up and Shout About Love", written by Larry and Tina Graham alongside Dees and performed by Larry Graham, are used for the song's bridge, interrupting West's rapping at the 5:32 mark. West briefly raps alongside Lamar at the start of the song, who performs the first verse and adds to the backdrop. Layers of production drop out after the verse, being followed by West performing the chorus. West raps for the song's remainder, with him contributing a 90-bar verse. The song closes with sound effects of crowd cheers from the basketball video game NBA Jam (2010).

Throughout "No More Parties in LA", West reflects on a variety of aspects of Hollywood culture and experiencing fame. Lamar chronicles the beginning of a relationship; he references American singer-songwriter Erykah Badu in one line, using her for a sexual verb. Meanwhile, West name-drops fellow artists Lauryn Hill, Cam'ron, and André 3000. West mentions a Pablo character in certain lyrics of the song that he claims to "feel like", though does not explicitly state who the character is. With the references to it, West offers an introduction of the Pablo character of The Life of Pablo. Prior to the song's bridge, he calls out his cousin for stealing his laptop, continuing the subject of his theft that the rapper previously mentioned on "Real Friends".

== Release and artwork ==
"No More Parties in LA" missed its original scheduled Friday release date of January 15, 2016. Kardashian apologized on West's behalf and explained that this was due to him not finishing the song in time because of a Yeezy Season 3 fitting in Italy. After her explanation, West subsequently announced that the song was to be released "very very extremely soon". "No More Parties in LA" was released via SoundCloud as the second promotional single for SWISH's GOOD Fridays series on Monday January 18, 2016. The song's title was often stylized as "No More Parties in L.A.". West's seventh studio album The Life of Pablo was released on February 14, 2016, including "No More Parties in LA" as the seventeenth track.

Alongside West's announcement of the song's release, he tweeted the song's cover art. Similarly to that of "Real Friends", the artwork displays a younger version of West than him in 2016. On it, West is shown at a social gathering with his family. The artwork was described by Capital Xtra as a "throwback picture".

== Critical reception ==
"No More Parties in LA" was met with universal acclaim from music critics, who mostly complimented West's verse. Matthew Ramirez of Pitchfork directed praise towards West's lyrical content, remarking that his "ability to connect to listeners" makes "the problems and lifestyles of the very, very rich" feel relatable. Ramirez continued, analyzing how the song passes "in the blink of an eye" with Lamar's "monster" verse and Madlib's "painterly" beat "reinforces how revitalized Kanye is after a spotty 2015", concluding by noting "an air of the unfiltered rawness of 'old Kanye'". NME author Leonie Cooper expressed a similar sentiment, lauding the song for being "doused with an old school soul vibe" and "vintage class", attributing both to Madlib's production while highlighting the sampling of "Stand Up and Shout About Love". Cooper preferred West's performance to Lamar's, admitting that despite the latter's "strong opening" in which he "eloquently airs some impressively mucky musings", West "shines" and she was not surprised by this due to the song being "his track first and foremost". She specifically appreciated West's smooth delivery and his lyricism, complimenting his storytelling.

David Drake from Rolling Stone commented that in comparison to West's output from the time period of his sixth studio album Yeezus (2013), the song "suggests a return to the more tasteful and on-brand Kanye" of his 2010 GOOD Friday releases, analyzing it as doing so "with its autobiographical narrative and comfort-food soul sample". Comparing West and Lamar's verses, he said "Kanye is the more effective and affecting: Kendrick is abstract" while elaborating by opining that Lamar's performance "could as easily be symbolic as personal" but West's verse "meanwhile, is packed with the kind of simultaneous relatable, everyday arrogance and self-effacement that made his earliest work resonate". Reviewing "No More Parties in LA" for DIY, Tom Connick appreciated the sampling of "Stand Up and Shout About Love", and he observed that as Lamar is "out there taking the boastful crown", West takes happiness in remaining real. In Digital Spy, Lewis Corner stated the song features West and Lamar "spitting lyrical over hard beats and a soulful, hazy backdrop", praising the sampling of "Suzie Thundertussy" in particular. Writing for Billboard, Mitchell Peters viewed the song as demonstrating West's "effortless rap skills over a smooth beat". Spin's Kyle McGovern referenced the delayed release by labeling the song "worth the wait", with him branding it as "stunning" and complimenting Lamar's "masterful" verse.

In reviews of The Life of Pablo, critical commentary towards "No More Parties in LA" was similarly positive. For The Line of Best Fit, Tom Thorogood wrote that the song's beat having the allowance "to ride out" makes for an impressive result. David Edwards from Under the Radar commented that the song "swings and spins around" the "Suzie Thundertussy" sample, describing it as "cracking the lid open on the dark, sordid underbelly of the city". AllMusic writer David Jeffries viewed the combination of Lamar's vocals, Madlib's production, and the samples of Morrison and Graham as being supportive of "a smooth, rolling soul song they never could've imagined". Xcel felt that Madlib's "suitably abstract beat" enables West and Lamar to trade verses on the song. At The Guardian, Alexis Petridis noted the "funny, smart" track for being among "wh[er]e there are great lines and verses" on the album. Reviewing The Life of Pablo for Spin, Greg Tate voiced strongly positive feelings towards West's performance on the song by calling it "the only duet-cut" on which he "displays enough oomph" for another artist not to be needed.

=== Accolades ===
Reactor 105.7 FM ranked "No More Parties in LA" as the 78th best song of 2016. The track was voted in at number 66 on The Village Voice's Pazz & Jop poll for that year with 8 mentions, being tied for the position with 9 other songs. Pitchfork named the track as the 32nd best song of 2016, with Raymond Cummings noting its potential to be "Kanye West's most urgently scatterbrained banger" while praising the performances of West and Lamar. On the Reader's Poll for the Top 50 Songs of 2016 that was conducted by the publication, "No More Parties in LA" was placed at number 16 from the readers' votes. The track was listed by HipHopDX as the 13th best song of the year. Its highest positioning was given by Treblezine, who ranked "No More Parties in LA" the seventh best song of 2016. West's verse was listed among the 20 best verses of 2016 by Complex, with Ross Scarano describing his performance as "a long verse that unwinds with the energy of Forrest Gump realizing he doesn't need those leg braces" and also noting the verse as showing him being "spiteful, funny, candid, paternal, drugged out and [...] lusty". Jack O'Keeffe from Bustle wrote in a 2016 article that if West wants to win Best Rap Performance at the 59th Annual Grammy Awards, then the song may be "his best shot" at winning the award. It was ultimately nominated in no categories whatsoever at the ceremony in 2017, which Sam Rullo of the publication viewed as a snub.

== Commercial performance ==
Following the release of The Life of Pablo, "No More Parties in LA" debuted at number three on the US Billboard Bubbling Under R&B/Hip-Hop Singles chart. The song lasted for three weeks on the chart. On August 15, 2018, "No More Parties in LA" was certified gold by the Recording Industry Association of America (RIAA) for sales of 500,000 certified units in the United States. Prior to the album's release, the song reached number 45 on the Mexico Ingles Airplay chart. It only spent one week on the chart. In the United Kingdom, the song peaked at number 133 on the UK Singles Chart. The song further reached number 39 on the UK R&B Chart.

== In popular culture ==
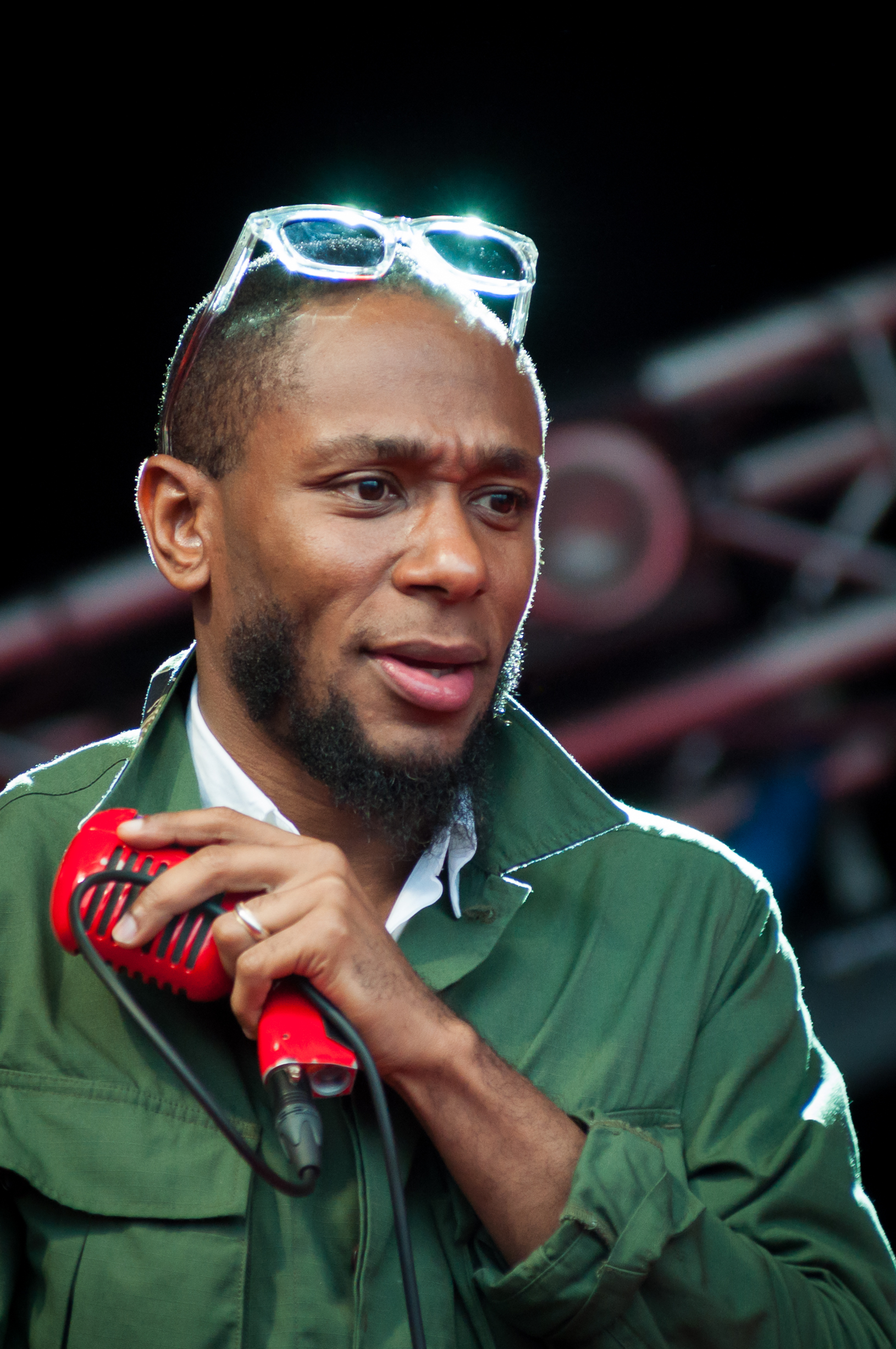
Yasiin Bey referenced the song with "No More Parties in SA", which was recorded in South Africa.

Under his real name of Yasiin Bey, fellow rapper Mos Def posted a freestyle to West's website entitled "No More Parties in SA" in reference to "No More Parties in LA" on January 20, 2016. On the freestyle, Bey raps multiple claims of innocence. The freestyle was recorded as part of a voice message, after Bey was detained at Cape Town International Airport for allegedly trying to leave South Africa with an unofficial "world passport". Bey posted the full message to West's Twitter page, calling him "a real friend". On January 27, 2016, Freddie Gibbs shared his remix of the song, titled "Cocaine Parties in L.A". Speaking of using the song's beat for the remix, Freddie Gibbs commented that he "had to show [West and Lamar] how to do it". Lyrically, the remix focuses on the drug trade.

In March 2016, West's sister-in-law Kendall Jenner named the track as her favorite song from the album. West released a sweatshirt inspired by The Life of Pablo in May 2016 that reads "LOS ANGELES" in a triangular pyramid-shaped graphic on the front, while it features "NO MORE PARTIES IN LA" in red script on the back. Erykah Badu responded to Lamar's name–drop of her in it in July 2016, tweeting a photograph of the two of them at the 2013 BET Awards and writing, "[he] ain't called me since y'all made up some s[hi]t about us being in the trailer makin' out so he missed his award." American record producer Sporting Life shared his "Golf Master" remix of the song on February 16, 2017. Morrison's sampled vocals are looped up for the remix while West's vocals are filtered down to a whisper, and it adds dreamy keys. On October 5, 2017, fellow rapper Asher Roth freestyled over the song.

== Credits and personnel ==
Credits adapted from West's official website.

Recording

- Mixed at Larrabee Studios, North Hollywood, CA

Personnel

- Kanye West – songwriter, production
- Madlib – songwriter, production
- Kendrick Lamar – songwriter, vocals
- John Watson – songwriter
- Walter Morrison – songwriter
- Herbert Rooney – songwriter
- Ronald Bean – songwriter
- Highleigh Crizoe – songwriter
- Ghostface Killah – songwriter
- Larry Graham – songwriter
- Tina Graham – songwriter
- Sam Dees – songwriter
- Malik Yusef – songwriter
- Noah Goldstein – engineer
- Andrew Dawson – engineer
- MixedByAli – engineer
- Manny Marroquin – mixer
- Chris Galland – assistant mixer
- Ike Schultz – assistant mixer
- Jeff Jackson – assistant mixer

== Charts ==
Chart performance for "No More Parties in LA"
Chart (2016)	Peak position
Mexico Ingles Airplay (Billboard)	45
UK Singles (Official Charts)	133
UK Hip Hop/R&B (Official Charts)	39
US Bubbling Under R&B/Hip-Hop Singles (Billboard)	3

== Certifications ==
Certifications for "No More Parties in LA"
Region	Certification	Certified units/sales
New Zealand (RMNZ)	Gold	15,000^{‡}
United Kingdom (BPI)	Silver	200,000^{‡}
United States (RIAA)	Platinum	1,000,000^{‡}
^{‡} Sales+streaming figures based on certification alone.
