= Jake Schreier =

American film director (born 1981)

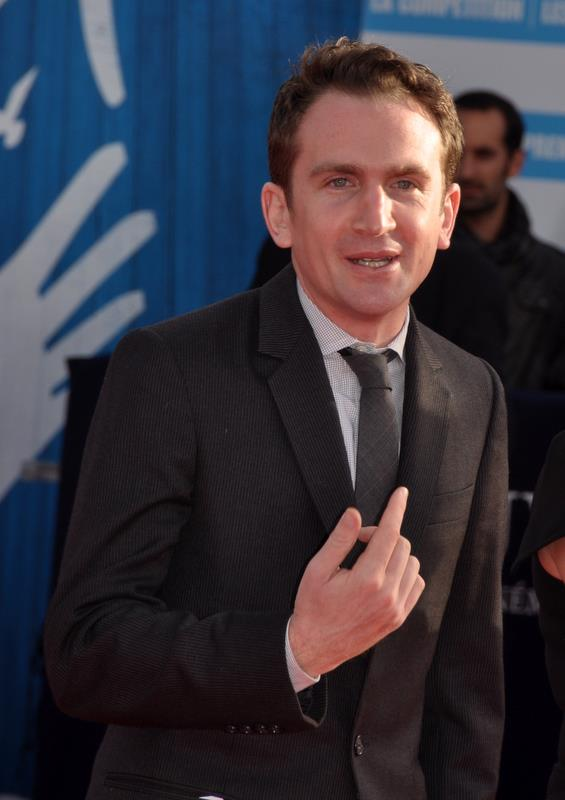
- Schreier at the Deauville American Film Festival in 2012
- Born: Jacob Stacey Schreier; September 29, 1981 (age 45); Berkeley, California, U.S.
- Education: New York University
- Occupation: Filmmaker
- Years active: 2006–present
- Known for: Robot & Frank (2012); Paper Towns (2015); Beef (2023); Thunderbolts* (2025)

Jacob Stacey Schreier (born September 29, 1981) is an American director. He was a founding member of Waverly Films, a Brooklyn-based filmmaking collective, and joined Park Pictures in 2006, releasing his first feature film Robot & Frank (2012). He also directed the John Green film adaptation Paper Towns (2015), and the Marvel Cinematic Universe films Thunderbolts* (2025) and the upcoming untitled X-Men film (2028).

== Early life ==
Schreier was born in Berkeley, California, to Jewish parents; his father is a psychiatrist for children. Schreier attended the New York University Tisch School of the Arts. After graduating, he directed music videos, including one for Francis and the Lights, a performer/songwriter with whom Schreier also played keyboard for several years. He also directed commercials for products such as Absolut Vodka and Verizon phones. Together with his friends from college, he co-founded the film collective Waverly Films and continued to collaborate on film projects for television and the web.

== Film career ==
In 2006, Schreier signed with Park Pictures, a commercial and film production company, and worked on a number of advertising campaigns and commercials; he was noted for his work and appeared in the “Best New Directors” list of Creativity Magazine and other advertising industry magazines. In 2012, he released his first feature film, Robot & Frank, based on the screenplay by his Tisch classmate and friend Christopher Ford. The film won the Alfred P. Sloan Prize at the Sundance Film Festival, for best feature film that focuses on science or technology as a theme, tying with the Kashmiri film Valley of Saints. Robot & Frank earned Schreier critical acclaim for his feature directorial debut. Los Angeles Times film critic Kenneth Turan called it "exceptionally polished for a first-time effort", and Rolling Stone gave it three out of four stars. He also directed the film adaptation of the John Green book, Paper Towns, which was released on July 24, 2015.

In 2021, frequent collaborator Chance the Rapper released Magnificent Coloring World, a concert film made from special performance footage Schreier directed in 2016. An international distribution agreement with AMC Theatres and Park Pictures for the film was made, marking the first time an individual recording artist has distributed a film exclusively through AMC.

In June 2022, Schreier was hired to direct the Marvel Studios superhero Marvel Cinematic Universe (MCU) film Thunderbolts*. The film received generally positive reviews.

In 2025, a week after the release of Thunderbolts*, Schreier became the top choice to direct an X-Men film for Marvel Studios. On July 20, 2025, Schreier was officially confirmed as the film's director.

== Filmography ==
=== Film ===
Director

- Robot & Frank (2012)
- Paper Towns (2015)
- Thunderbolts* (2025)
- Fear of Missing Out (2026 short film)

Associate producer

- Natural Selection (2011)
- Magic Valley (2011)
- First Winter (2012)

Concert film

- Chance the Rapper's Magnificent Coloring World (2021)

=== Television ===
Year	Title	Notes
2013	Alpha House	Episode "Tiggers"
2016	Shameless	Episode "NSFW"
2017–2018	I'm Dying Up Here	Episodes "The Return" and "The Mattresses"
2018–2019	Lodge 49	6 episodes
2018–2020	Kidding	6 episodes
2021	Dave	Episode "International Gander"
2021	Brand New Cherry Flavor	Episodes "Milk Bath" and "Egg"
2021	The Premise	Episode "Butt Plug"
2022	Minx	Episode "An exciting new chapter in the annals of erotica"
2023–present	Beef	8 episodes; Also executive producer
2024	Star Wars: Skeleton Crew	Episode "You Have a Lot to Learn About Pirates"

=== Music videos ===
Year	Title	Artist	Ref.
2005	"Off the Record"	My Morning Jacket	
2006	"Don't Leave Me Blue"	The Blue Van	
2008	"The Top"	Francis and the Lights	
2010	"Darling, It's Alright"	Francis and the Lights	
2013	"Like a Dream"	Francis and the Lights	
2016	"Friends"	Francis and the Lights featuring Bon Iver and Kanye West	
2016	"Trust Nobody"	Cashmere Cat featuring Selena Gomez and Tory Lanez	
2016	"See Her Out (That's Just Life)"	Francis and the Lights	
2017	"Same Drugs"	Chance the Rapper	
2017	"9 (After Coachella)"	Cashmere Cat featuring MØ and Sophie	
2017	"May I Have This Dance"	Francis and the Lights featuring Chance the Rapper	
2017	"Want You Back"	Haim	
2018	"Eastside"	Benny Blanco, Halsey and Khalid	
2018	"The Video in the Pool"	Francis and the Lights	
2018	"I Found You"	Benny Blanco and Calvin Harris	
2019	"I Found You / Nilda's Story"	Benny Blanco, Calvin Harris and Miguel	
2019	"I Can't Get Enough"	Benny Blanco, Tainy, Selena Gomez and J Balvin	
2019	"Graduation	Benny Blanco and Juice Wrld	
2019	"Emotions"	Cashmere Cat	
2019	"For Your Eyes Only"	Cashmere Cat	
2019	"Follow God"	Kanye West	
2019	"Closed on Sunday"	Kanye West	
2020	"I Know Alone"	Haim	
2020	"Don't Wanna"	Haim	
2020	"Lonely"	Justin Bieber and Benny Blanco	
2021	"Issues"	Baby Keem	
2022	"We Cry Together"	Kendrick Lamar	
2025	"Younger and Hotter Than Me"	Selena Gomez and Benny Blanco	
