= Bowersock =

Bowersock is a surname. Notable people with the surname include:

- Glen Bowersock (born 1936), American historian
- J. P. Bowersock, American record producer
- Jane Dee Hull (née Bowersock) (1935–2020), American politician
- Justin De Witt Bowersock (1842–1922), American politician
