= Ghost Town (Kanye West song) =

2018 song by Kanye West

Song by Kanye West featuring PartyNextDoor

from the album Ye
- Released: June 1, 2018
- Recorded: 2017 – June 1, 2018
- Studio: West Lake Ranch, Jackson Hole, Wyoming
- Genre: Experimental hip-hop; alternative rock
- Length: 4:31
- Label: GOOD; Def Jam
- Songwriters: Kanye West; Carole Bayer Sager; Cydel Young; Danielle Balbuena; Dexter Mills; Francis Starlite; Helen Culver; Jahron Brathwaite; Jordan Thorpe; Kenneth Pershon; Malik Jones; Mike Dean; Noah Goldstein; Shirley Ann Lee; Terrence Boykin; Trade Martin
- Producers: Kanye West; Mike Dean; Francis and the Lights; Benny Blanco

Ye track listing
- 7 tracks: 1. "I Thought About Killing You"; 2. "Yikes"; 3. "All Mine"; 4. "Wouldn't Leave"; 5. "No Mistakes"; 6. "Ghost Town"; 7. "Violent Crimes"

"Ghost Town" is a song by the American rapper Kanye West from his eighth studio album, Ye (2018). It features a guest appearance from the Canadian singer PartyNextDoor and additional vocals from the American rappers Kid Cudi and 070 Shake. West produced "Ghost Town" with assistance from Mike Dean, Francis and the Lights, Benny Blanco, and Noah Goldstein. It was recorded for West and Kid Cudi's collaborative album Kids See Ghosts (2018), but was moved to Ye shortly before its release on June 1, 2018.

A hip-hop track with rock elements, "Ghost Town" is based on samples of "Take Me for a Little While" by the Royal Jesters and "Someday" by Shirley Ann Lee, while the chorus interpolates the Dave Edmunds recording of "Take Me for a Little While". Music critics described "Ghost Town"'s tone as psychedelic. It portrays West's mind unraveling, connecting to Ye's themes of mental illness, and he gargles unfinished thoughts. PartyNextDoor and Kid Cudi sing the intro and chorus, while during the outro, 070 Shake belts about numbness.

"Ghost Town" received acclaim from critics, who considered it one of Ye's best tracks. They praised the production and 070 Shake's outro, though West's verse drew mixed responses, with some criticizing his singing ability. Multiple publications, including Consequence and NME, named "Ghost Town" one of the best songs of 2018. West and Kid Cudi released a sequel, "Freeee (Ghost Town, Pt. 2)", that features Ty Dolla Sign and interpolates the original's lyrics in Kids See Ghosts on June 8.

"Ghost Town" peaked at number 16 on the US Billboard Hot 100 and in the top 20 in New Zealand and the UK. It has been certified double platinum and platinum in the US and the UK by the Recording Industry Association of America and the British Phonographic Industry, respectively. West and Kid Cudi performed "Ghost Town" on Saturday Night Live in 2018 and at the Coachella Music Festival in 2019. BadBadNotGood and Jungle performed cover versions in 2018.

== Background and development ==
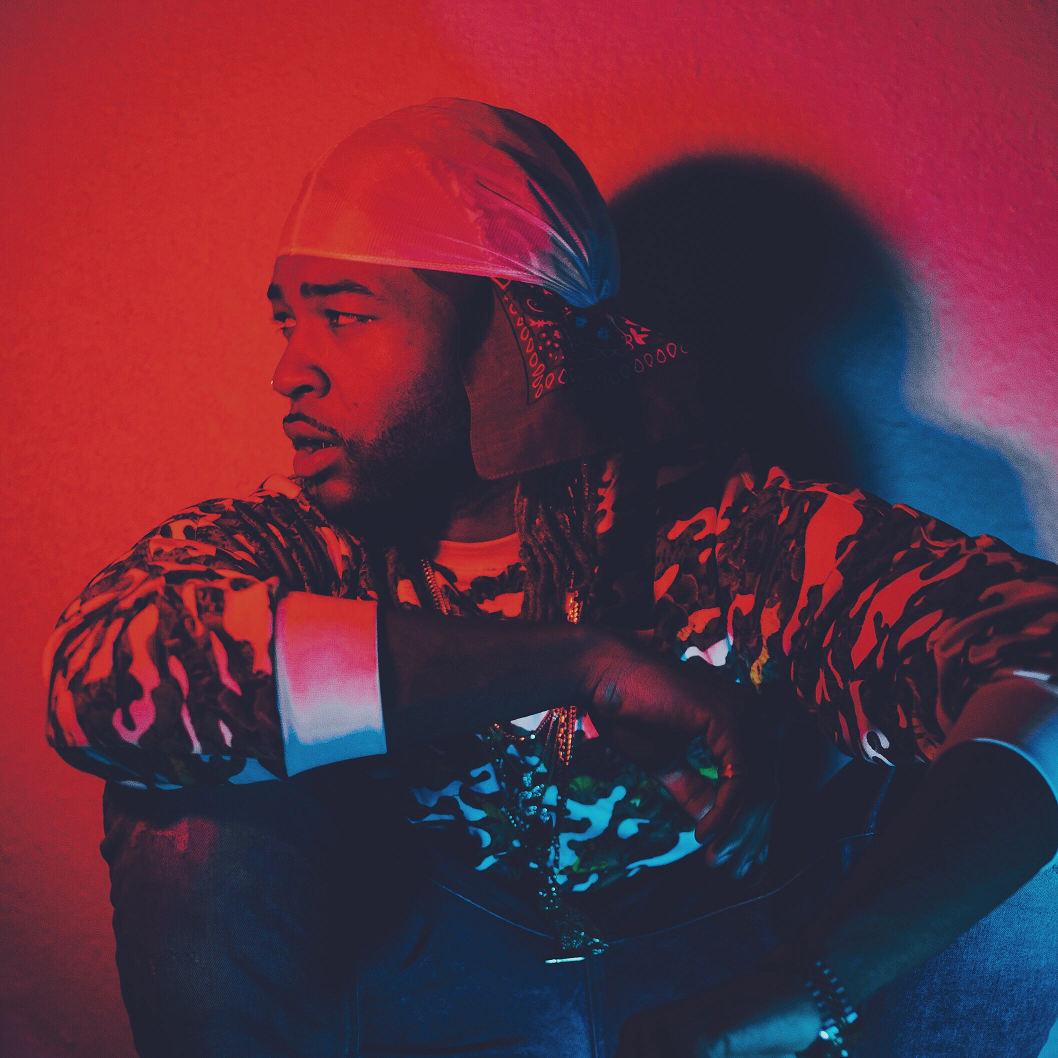
The song features vocals from PartyNextDoor, who teased a collaboration with West via Twitter.

A link was shared by West via his blog on February 7, 2009, to a cover version of his 2007 single "Can't Tell Me Nothing" by American pop project Francis and the Lights. They first collaborated on the latter's single "Friends" in 2016 alongside Bon Iver, and West has a cameo in the accompanying music video. Along with "Ghost Town", Francis and the Lights contributed production to the tracks "I Thought About Killing You" and "All Mine". He handled additional production for the former of the three, alongside Benny Blanco and Noah Goldstein, while Mike Dean co-produced it and West served as the lead producer.

In a November 2016 interview with NOW Magazine, Canadian musician PartyNextDoor cited West as someone he wanted to produce and write at the level of, while also stating that he was influenced by West when he was younger. Following the release of his third EP Colours 2 in June 2017, PartyNextDoor tweeted on July 20 of that year that he had new music on the way with West, and Apple Music simultaneously responded via Twitter. At the time, it was unknown what project the two were recording for, and PartyNextDoor had only previously contributed to West's work by co-writing "Waves" in 2016. PartyNextDoor later tweeted a picture of the two of them talking on July 22, 2017, the first photographic evidence of their collaboration. Alongside "Ghost Town", PartyNextDoor provided vocals and songwriting for Ye's track "Wouldn't Leave", though he wasn't properly credited until the album's credits were updated on streaming services on June 15, 2018.

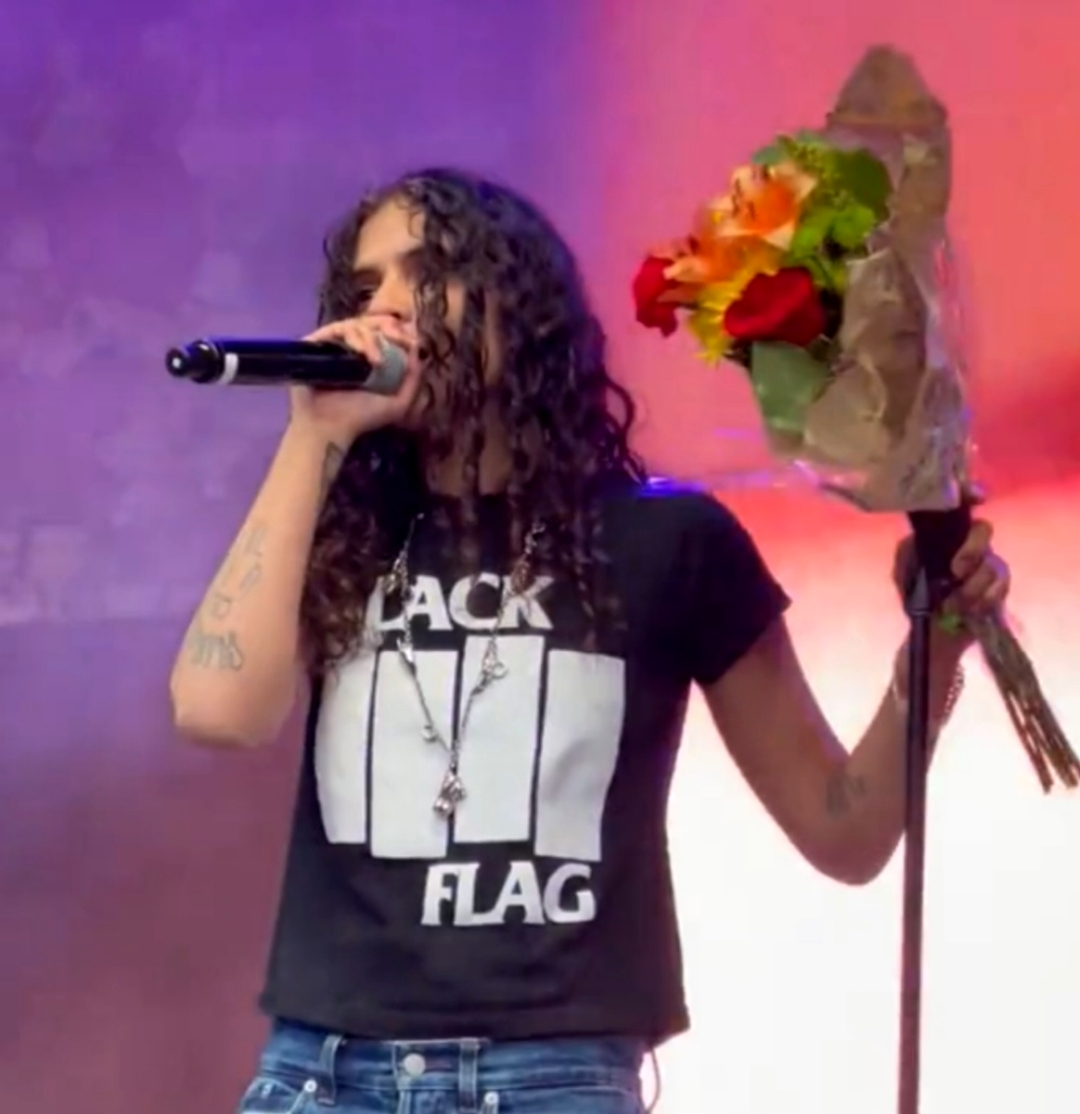
070 Shake was insistent on signing to West's label GOOD Music and when listening back to the song, she was determined to focus on the moment of her first listen.

Initially an unknown SoundCloud user, American hip-hop artist 070 Shake refused to sign with anyone other than West. 070 Shake ultimately signed to his record label GOOD Music in 2016 and recalled West advising her "to ultimately be 100 percent open when you're creating and let your mind wander," as well as to not "set any boundaries for yourself." The song and fellow album track "Violent Crimes" both include vocals from 070 Shake. In an interview with Rolling Stone, she stated that after the song, a lot of people were contacting her by phone and recalled being "like, 'How did you get my number?' and shit." When listening to the song for the first time, 070 Shake labeled the feeling "surreal" and said she placed focus on taking the whole moment in so she would not have regretted failing to take it in properly after the time, while 070 Shake opined that being on a record with West felt "crazy".

A promotional video was displayed on West's official website from the Ye listening party that was set to "Ghost Town" and "I Thought About Killing You", though the website was ultimately updated on October 22, 2019. West assembled the listening party on the night before the album's release in Jackson Hole, Wyoming, which is the same place that it was recorded by him. Kevin Parker of Tame Impala initially believed that he was credited as a co-writer on the song instead of "Violent Crimes", until he was informed that the latter was played at the listening party. Parker had allegedly sent a number of samples to West for Ye, but assumed that they hadn't made the cut after not hearing back from him. West began to come to Jackson Hole often from early 2017 onwards, months after his stay in the hospital. After he left the hospital, notes were made by West about his experiences and feelings. As part of the album's songwriting process, West gave his notes to various writers for them to help add structure to his thoughts. When discussing his songwriting process during an interview with The New York Times on June 25, 2018, West revealed that co-writer Malik Yusef was responsible for the lyrics "Sometimes I take all the shine/Talk like I drank all the wine." Before combining rap with rock, West and Kid Cudi had shown admiration for rock artists.

== Composition and lyrics ==
"Ghost Town"
A 26 second sample of the song, featuring guitar alongside an interpolation of Dave Edmunds' "Take Me for a Little While" from Kid Cudi and West gargling unfinished thoughts in a dazed tone with a reused verse melody from "Runaway".

Musically, "Ghost Town" is a hip-hop track that is often noted for its rock elements. The song includes a sample of "Take Me for a Little While", written by Trade Martin and performed by the Royal Jesters, within its leading bass, drum, and keys combination. The opening of the track features a sample of "Someday", as performed by Shirley Ann Lee. Guitars are included within the song, which some writers viewed as psychedelic. In particular, "Ghost Town" has been noted for taking rock influence from Kid Cudi's work, with a "strong presence of guitars" that Will Lavin of Joe.co.uk called "very reminiscent of a couple of tracks" from his second studio album Man on the Moon II: The Legend of Mr. Rager (2010). The Atlantic's Spencer Kornhaber commented that the song features "psychedelic, space-soul, and prog sounds." West's tone is dazed, with him using the same verse melody as that of his Pusha T-featuring single "Runaway" (2010). In the outro, laser sounds are featured.

The song presents the mind of West going through the process of unraveling, with the ongoing speculation that his mental health is often poor. Mental illness is a common theme on Ye; the song is linked to the subject matter of the album that West's mind is unraveling. PartyNextDoor sings about feeling so good that it is dangerous. West's verse in the song sees him gargling multiple half-finished thoughts as he opens up his mind. The lyrics of West's verse include a reference to the opioid painkiller fentanyl. While singing the chorus of "Ghost Town", Kid Cudi interpolates vocals from rock and roll artist Dave Edmunds' 1979 version of "Take Me for a Little While". The outro is performed by 070 Shake, featuring her singing about freedom and numbness in a manner that has been described as belting. 070 Shake explained that she used a metaphor for numbness with the line, "Put my hand on the stove, to see if I still bleed."

== Release and recording ==
"Ghost Town" was released on June 1, 2018, as the sixth and penultimate track on West's eighth studio album, Ye. However, West tweeted out an early track list of the eponymous debut studio album by Kids See Ghosts, a hip-hop duo consisting of him and Kid Cudi, on May 15 of that year, and this showed the song as originally being scheduled for release on the album. It was slated to be released as the fourth track, though the shuffling of tracks between albums recorded by West led to the song being released on Ye instead. The song's follow-up was released by Kids See Ghosts under the title "Freeee (Ghost Town, Pt. 2)" on June 8, 2018, also being led to by the shuffling.

In an interview with Pigeons & Planes, 070 Shake revealed that the song was finished hours before the album's listening party on May 31, 2018, and recalled reference tracks being recorded: "I had done a reference for it, and then I guess he forgot about it. We put that reference on another song, then Kanye did his own reference for that 'free' concept." She explained in the interview that it came close to not making the album's final cut during the recording sessions: "At the end, we were talking and asking, 'Is this the one right here?' And I kind of mentioned 'Ghost Town' and said maybe we could use something from that." 070 Shake elaborated, revealing that after listening to the reference again, West "said, 'Oh yeah, this is the one.'" She concluded, stating, "So 'Ghost Town' almost didn't make it." According to 070 Shake, she wrote the reference track after first arriving in Wyoming, and West had forgotten about it due to him being "very focused on a lot of other things, other songs and stuff [sic], and it just left his mind a little bit." Recording for Ye started after West made controversial comments about slavery in a TMZ interview earlier in May 2018 that led to the album being re-done afterward.

== Critical reception ==
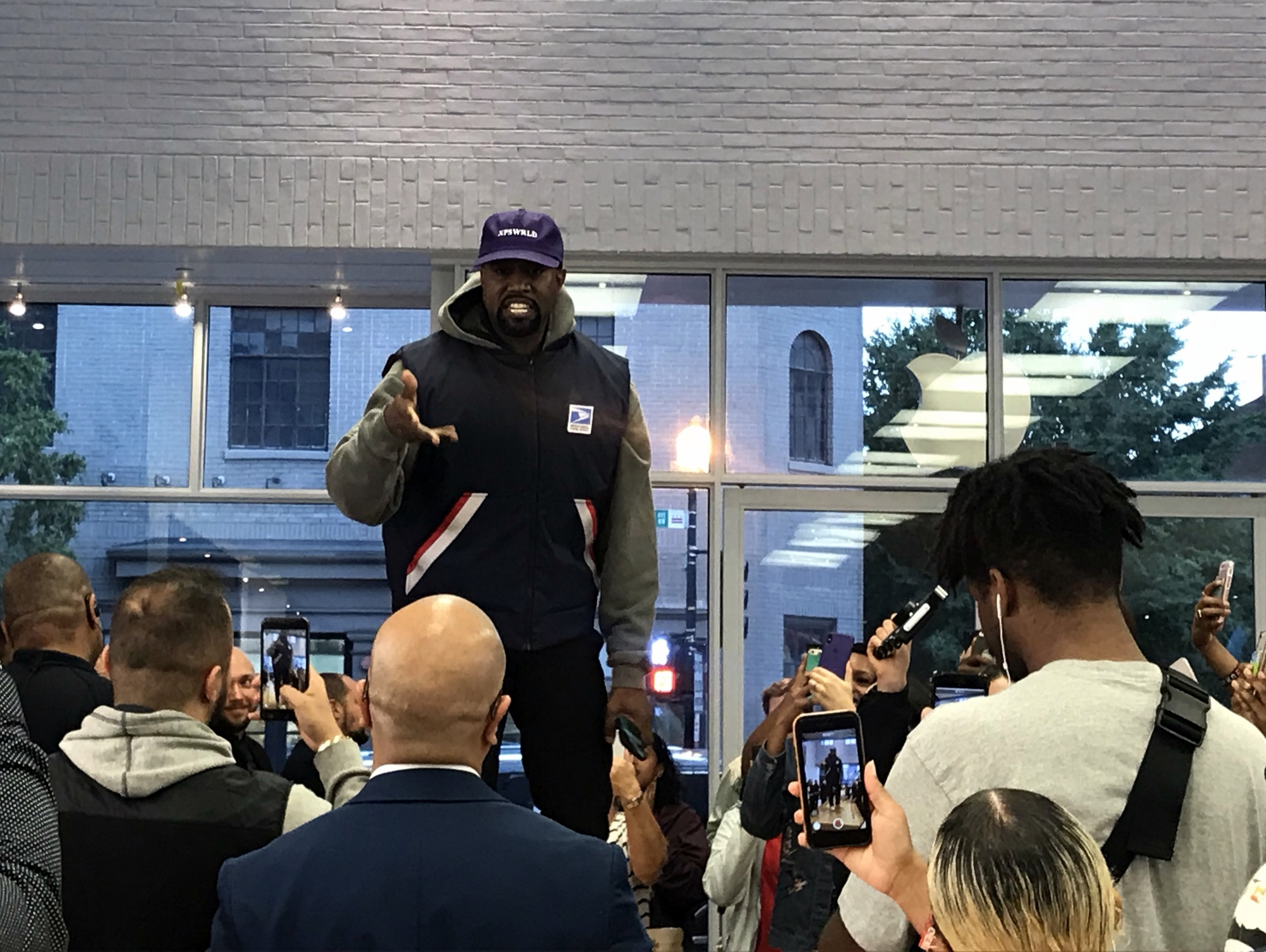
Some critics were mixed towards West's verse, with some criticizing his singing ability.

"Ghost Town" was met with acclaim from music critics, often being ranked as one of the album's highlights. Meaghan Garvey of Pitchfork pointed to the track as "ye's clear highlight," while she regarded the outro by 070 Shake and Kid Cudi's refrain as being better than West's verse, especially noting that 070 Shake's "performance is unexpectedly magnetic." Carrie Battan from The New Yorker named the track as the best song, pointing out its elements of soul and pop punk, though she viewed the track as "the finest example of hip-hop's current fascination with rock music" and praised the outro by 070 Shake for showing that her "androgynous, pubescent voice is used to create a bridge between the joyous and the morbid." Outside of "I Thought About Killing You" and "Yikes," The Independent's Christopher Hooton billed the track as the album's "only other remotely good song." Hooton continued, viewing it as being salvaged by 070 Shake "with a stunning, anthemic and sincere vocal over a crunchy guitar riff." Rob Sheffield of Rolling Stone complemented the song for being the only track on Ye that "stands on its own" and also directed praise towards 070 Shake's vocals, though concluded by writing that the song has "genuine heart – enough heart to make you wish Kanye could find a way out of his current creative trap." Douglas Greenwood from NME described the song as the album's "penultimate and perhaps strongest track" and argued that it "owes a great deal to its euphoric, rocky outro" from 070 Shake, with him viewing the outro as "a moment of real clarity on a record that's immediately impactful." Writing for Entertainment Weekly, Alex Suskind highlighted the song as one of Ye's "few bright spots," commenting that it "resembles My Beautiful Dark Twisted Fantasy opus 'Runaway'" and Suskind directed praise towards the lyrical content. Adam Rothbarth of Tiny Mix Tapes commented with praise for Kid Cudi's "purposely gnarly" refrain, West's "elegant vocal performance" and the production of the song. However, Rothbarth opined that the production "sets the perfect foundation for 070 Shake's cyclical" outro and cited the outro as one of the highlights of Ye.

Clayton Purdom from The A.V. Club stated that "Ghost Town" "holds up the entire album" and labeled the song as "a staggeringly dense sound collage that sounds like a wide-open Wyoming night sky coming alive with dreamy laser blasts." The Irish Times' Ed Power referred to the song as "gorgeous and uncomplicated." Trent Clark from HipHopDX pointed towards the "passionate cameo" from 070 Shake on the song as what "unveils a star-in-the-making." Greg Kot of the Chicago Tribune said that it shows "West telegraphing his vulnerability through shaky singing," despite concluding that 070 Shake "walks away with the song." AllMusic writer Neil Z. Yeung asserted that the song shines as one of the album's "moments of clarity" and commended the lyrical content. For the Los Angeles Times, Mikael Wood viewed West and 070 Shake's singing as "just astounding" and cited the latter's outro as "a star-making cameo," while also noting the clarity displayed by 070 Shake. Zachary Hoskins was less enthusiastic in Slant Magazine, dismissing West's verse despite naming the song as the most polished track on Ye and positively writing of the guitar, as well as Kid Cudi's vocals. In a negative review for The Line of Best Fit, Ross Horton panned the singing on the song and called it "the kind of thing that you once could, objectively, understand to be joke," with the loudness of the vocals receiving criticism from him. Similarly, Steve 'Flash' Juon of RapReviews complained that having to listen to West's singing on the song makes him "just like 'Whyyyyyyy?'" Juon insisted that his opinion of West lacking in singing ability bore no relevance to any dislike towards him, as Juon admitted that Chris Brown can sing despite not liking him either.

== Accolades ==
Vulture named "Ghost Town" as one of the best new songs for the week of June 7, 2018. Hunter Harris of the site labeled the track as "a mediocre album's best offering," though directed praise towards 070 Shake's outro. It was listed as one of the best songs from the first half of the year by Junkee, with Lauren Ziegler calling the track "a therapy session." Refinery29 named it to their list of 2018's best summer songs, published in June of that year. On uDiscoverMusic's November 2019 list of the West's best samples, the Royal Jesters sample on the track was ranked 20th. For the website, Paul Bowler wrote that the sample is where West "returns to the soulful grooves with which he made his name" and viewed it as "powering" West's performance on "Ghost Town".

The track appeared on year-end lists by multiple publications, including being listed as the fifth-best song of 2018 by Consequence. Matt Melis of the publication complimented it as the "very best" of West's 2018, and Melis described the track as being "backed by a killer, old-school sample; surrounded by friends; and delivering a liberating, back-to-basics message." Joe ranked "Ghost Town" at the same position on their list, with Dave Hanratty calling it "an exceptional song that hit the heavens with power and grace." The track was named by The Daily Beast as the seventh-best song of 2018, and Marlow Stern called it West's most impressive work from that year, while he praised 070 Shake's outro, which accordingly "soars to the stratosphere."

Year-end lists for "Ghost Town"
Publication	Accolade	Rank	Ref.
Billboard	The 100 Best Songs of 2018	62	
Billboard	The Best Songs of Kanye West's Wyoming Sessions (Note: Pusha T's Daytona, Ye, Kids See Ghosts' Kids See Ghosts, Nas' Nasir, and Teyana Taylor's K.T.S.E.)	14	
Consequence	Top 50 Songs of 2018	5	
The Daily Beast	The 20 Best Songs of 2018	7	
Highsnobiety	The 50 Best Songs of 2018	37	
Joe	The 20 Best Songs of 2018	5	
NME	The Songs of the Year 2018	36	
NPR	The 100 Best Songs of 2018	56	
Triple J	Hottest 100 of 2018	98	
The Village Voice	The Pazz & Jop Music Critics Poll 2018	42	

== Commercial performance ==
Following the release of Ye, "Ghost Town" debuted on the US Billboard Hot 100 at number 16, standing as the highest charting non-single from the album. The song entered the US Streaming Songs chart at number eight, with 29.7 million streams. On the US Hot R&B/Hip-Hop Songs chart, it opened at number 11. By debuting at number two on the US Hot R&B Songs chart, the song stood as the only track from the album to enter the charts. The next week, following the release of Kids See Ghosts, the song descended 44 places to number 60 on the Hot 100, though it was two places higher on the chart than "Freeee (Ghost Town, Pt. 2)". For 2018, "Ghost Town" ranked at number 42 on the year-end US Hot R&B Songs chart. The song was certified double platinum by the Recording Industry Association of America (RIAA) for amassing 2,000,000 certified units in the United States on July 6, 2022.

The track performed best in New Zealand, peaking at number 14 on the NZ Singles Chart. Similarly, the track debuted on the UK Singles Chart at number 17, giving West his third top 40 entry on the chart issue that fell on the date of his 41st birthday. On January 9, 2026, "Ghost Town" received a platinum certification from the British Phonographic Industry (BPI) for pushing 600,000 units in the United Kingdom. The track reached number 21 on the Canadian Hot 100. On the ARIA Singles Chart, it debuted at number 22 and came close to giving West his third top 20 entry for that week. The track also reached the top 30 in Slovakia, Greece, Ireland, and Portugal. In Estonia, the song entered at number 37 on the Singlid tipp-40. The following week, it rose five places to number 32 on the chart. The track experienced lesser performance in the Czech Republic, reaching number 42 on the country's Singles Digitál Top 100 chart.

== Live performances ==
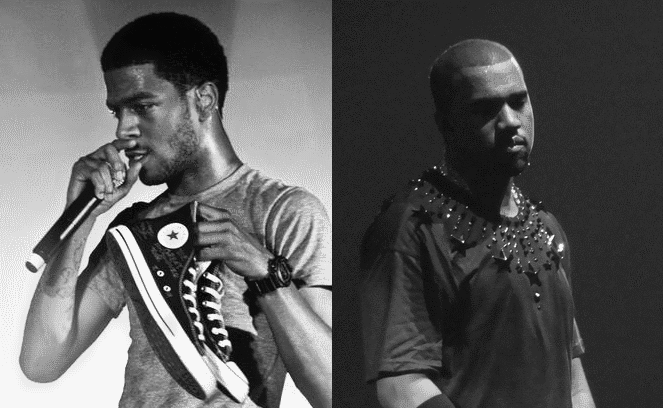
West and Kid Cudi (pictured right and left, respectively) have performed the song live together on multiple occasions.

070 Shake performed solely her part on the song live on June 22, 2018 for her set at Ladyland Fest in Brooklyn. The performance generated a positive reaction from the crowd, and they were able to recall the words to 070 Shake's part, though it marked the first time that any portion of the song had been performed live. On August 16, 2018, West and Kid Cudi delivered a performance of a rendition of it live at a surprise show in the Los Angeles nightclub Los Candiles as part of a private party in celebration of West's Yeezy Season 4 collaborator Willo Perron. A small room was covered in red lights for the performance, and the crowd joined in when the rappers shouted lyrics from the song, while this marked the first time that West had performed it live. The track was performed live by West, Kid Cudi, and 070 Shake on the outro of the 44th season premiere of Saturday Night Live in September 2018, with them being accompanied by a backing band. However, the performance was cut off around the time that 070 Shake began to deliver her part of it, and the song was followed by a speech from the West about his support of US President Donald Trump. Prior to West's appearance, SNL creator Lorne Michaels revealed in an interview on the Origins With James Andrew Miller podcast that West was booked for the show when he stepped up after singer Ariana Grande dropped out. For West and Kid Cudi's first performance, billed as Kids See Ghosts, the duo performed the song live as the closer to their set at the 2018 Camp Flog Gnaw Carnival.

West was joined by Kid Cudi and 070 Shake when leading his gospel group the Sunday Service Choir through a rendition of "Ghost Town" at their first concert on January 7, 2019. Later that month, the group collaborated with West for a rendition of the song as part of their concert. The performance began once West got up off a stool 36 minutes into the concert, with the rendition including an extended outro that saw him deliver a sermon. During the sermon, West said, "Don't it feel to know you can never be canceled. They say, 'You can't do this. You can't do that, you'll lose your career,' but I'm still here." On March 24, 2019, the Sunday Service Choir performed the song in Los Angeles for their 12th weekly concert. Kid Cudi brought out West as a surprise during the start of his weekend two set at the 2019 Coachella Music Festival, where the two performed a rendition of "Ghost Town".

On September 4, 2026, Ye and Kid Cudi performed "Ghost Town" together at Soldier Field in Chicago, during the second night of Ye's homecoming concerts. The performance marked their first live appearance together in several years.

== Appearances in media ==
Following the release of Ye, the song became a popular topic with fans of West across Twitter. Avenged Sevenfold member M. Shadows' published a list of his favorite tracks from 2018, which included "Ghost Town" on it. At a fashion show by Virgil Abloh during 2018 Paris Fashion Week, Canadian instrumental music group BadBadNotGood performed a cover version of the song. During the show, West and Kid Cudi were both in attendance. The laser sounds from the song resurfaced on singer Teyana Taylor's track "Issues/Hold On", which was produced by West and released on K.T.S.E. in June 2018. The song was covered by English soul musical collective Jungle on September 12, 2018, during a BBC Radio 1 session.

== Sequel ==
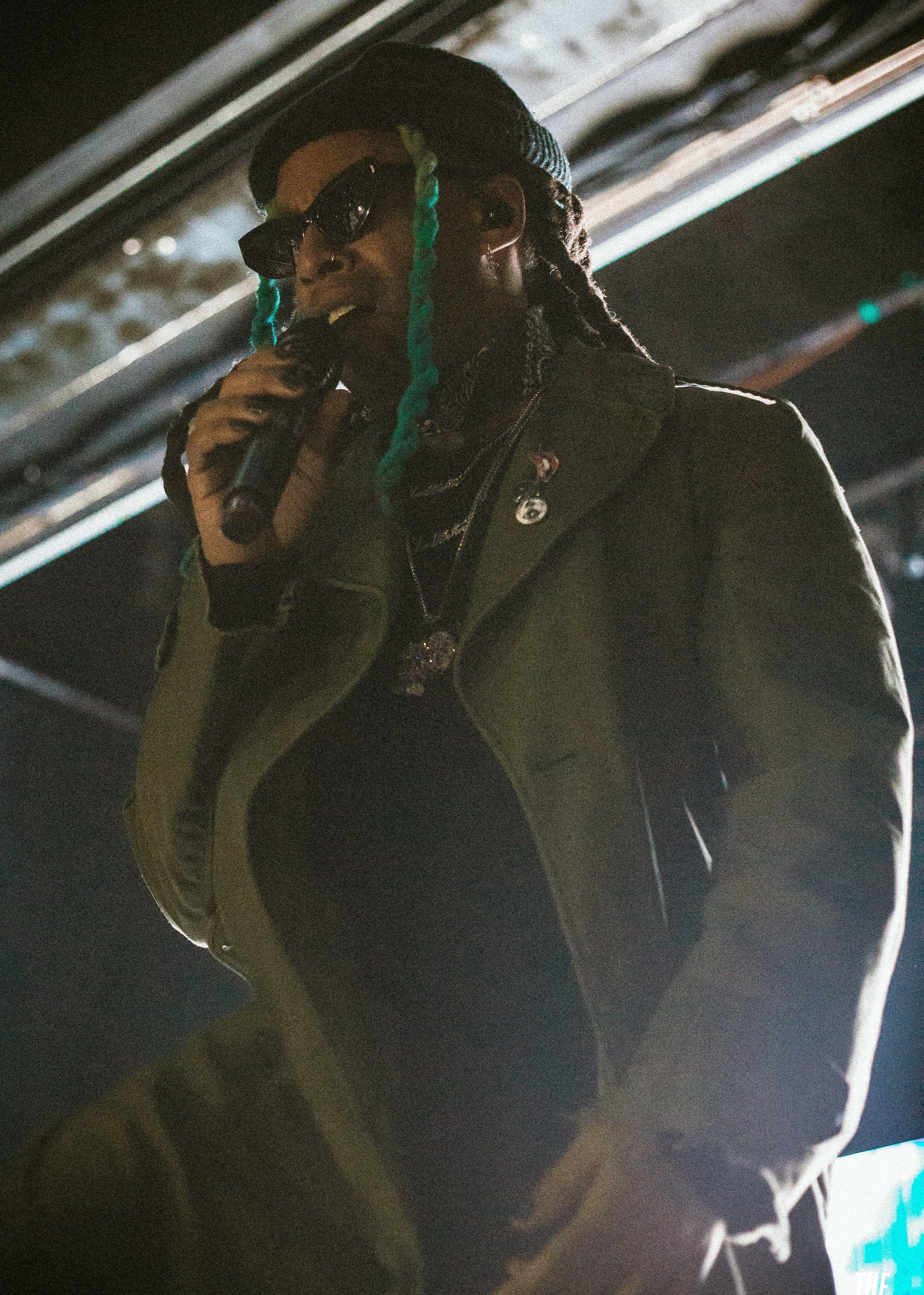
Ty Dolla Sign collaborated with Kids See Ghosts for the sequel.

On June 8, 2018, the sequel to "Ghost Town", "Freeee (Ghost Town, Pt. 2)", was released as the fourth track on Kids See Ghosts. Originally, the prequel was slated for release in this position, while the sequel had not been slated for inclusion initially. Prior to the album's release, Revolt TV writer Ralph Bristout stated that the song managed to "set up the excitement for" it. The titles of the album and the sequel, respectively, are part of a "spooky-ghost routine." The routine is continued by "Ghost Town" being titled as such, while Kids See Ghosts track "4th Dimension" is also linked to the song since they both sample Ann Lee's "Someday". Kids See Ghosts are the lead performers of the sequel, differing from the prequel, in which Kid Cudi is an additional vocalist and West is the lead performer. The sequel includes vocals from American musician Ty Dolla Sign. The song also interpolates lyrics from the prequel.

The song was less successful than the prequel on the Hot 100, debuting at number 62 on the chart. During Kid Cudi's appearance at Coachella 2019, he brought out West as a surprise. The two of them performed "Ghost Town" and the song alongside other collaborations. The staff of NME reassembled Ye and Kids See Ghosts for an edited album entitled Ye Sees Ghosts, featuring the prequel leading into the sequel.

== Credits and personnel ==
Recording

- Recorded at West Lake Ranch, Jackson Hole, Wyoming

Personnel

- Kanye West – production, songwriter
- Mike Dean – co-production, songwriter, engineering, mixing
- Noah Goldstein – additional production, songwriter, recording engineering
- Francis and the Lights – additional production
- Benny Blanco – additional production
- 070 Shake – songwriter, vocals
- PartyNextDoor – songwriter, vocals
- Carole Bayer Sager – songwriter
- Carmen Reece – songwriter
- Cydel Young – songwriter
- Dexter Mills – songwriter
- Francis Starlite – songwriter
- Jordan Thorpe – songwriter
- Kenneth Pershon – songwriter
- Malik Yusef – songwriter
- Shirley Ann Lee – songwriter
- Terrence Boykin – songwriter
- Trade Martin – songwriter
- Mike Malchicoff – engineering
- Zack Djurich – engineering
- Mauricio Iragorri – recording engineering
- Jess Jackson – mixing
- Kid Cudi – vocals

Credits adapted from Tidal.

== Charts ==
=== Weekly charts ===
Chart performance for "Ghost Town"
Chart (2018)	Peak position
Australia (ARIA)	22
Austria (Ö3 Austria Top 40)	67
Canada Hot 100 (Billboard)	21
Czech Republic Singles Digital (ČNS IFPI)	42
Estonia (Eesti Tipp-40)	32
France (SNEP)	146
Greece International Digital Singles (IFPI)	24
Hungary (Stream Top 40)	29
Ireland (IRMA)	24
Netherlands (Single Top 100)	81
New Zealand (Recorded Music NZ)	14
Portugal (AFP)	29
Slovakia Singles Digital (ČNS IFPI)	23
Sweden (Sverigetopplistan)	100
Switzerland (Schweizer Hitparade)	73
UK Singles (Official Charts)	17
UK Hip Hop/R&B (Official Charts)	23
US Billboard Hot 100	16
US Hot R&B/Hip-Hop Songs (Billboard)	11

=== Year-end charts ===
2018 year-end chart performance for "Ghost Town"
Chart (2018)	Position
US Hot R&B Songs (Billboard)	42

== Certifications ==
Certifications for "Ghost Town"
Region	Certification	Certified units/sales
Brazil (Pro-Música Brasil)	Gold	20,000^{‡}
Denmark (IFPI Danmark)	Gold	45,000^{‡}
New Zealand (RMNZ)	2× Platinum	60,000^{‡}
United Kingdom (BPI)	Platinum	600,000^{‡}
United States (RIAA)	2× Platinum	2,000,000^{‡}
^{‡} Sales+streaming figures based on certification alone.

== See also ==
- 2018 in hip hop music
