= Francis and the Lights =

American music project

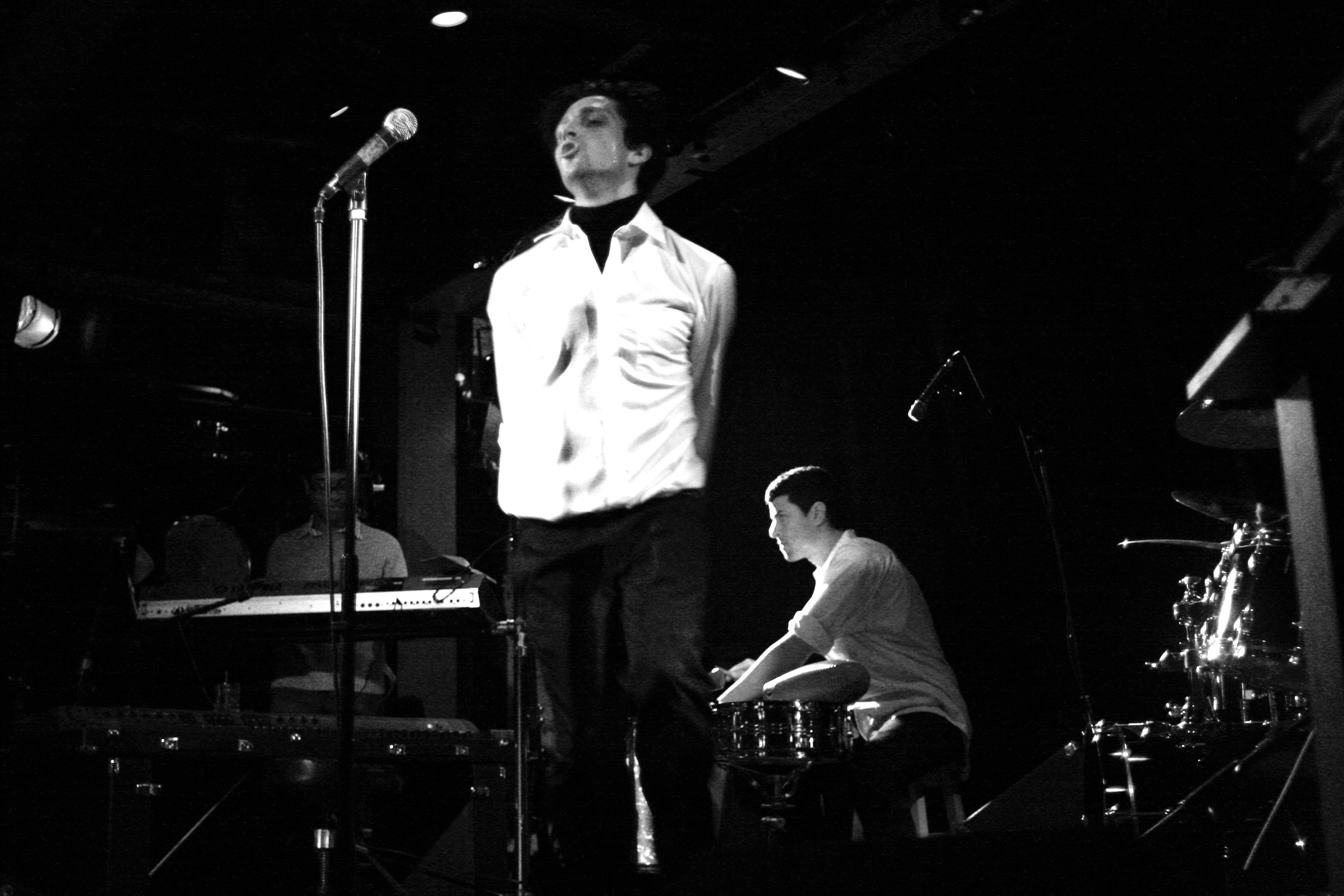
- Francis and the Lights performing in 2007

Background information
- Origin: Oakland, California, U.S.
- Genres: Electronic; alternative R&B; avant-garde
- Years active: 2007–present
- Labels: KTTF Music; GOOD; Cantora
- Members: Francis Farewell Starlite
- Website: francisandthelights.com

Francis and the Lights is an American music project created by Francis Farewell Starlite. The term "and the Lights" refers both to the lights on a stage and pixels on a computer screen. Francis Farewell Starlite (born Abe Morre Katz-Milder, June 14, 1981) is an American musician, record producer, singer, songwriter, and dancer. He is primarily a vocalist and pianist and is often credited by the Francis and the Lights name for his solo work. He is a frequent collaborator of artists and producers such as Kanye West, Justin Vernon, Cashmere Cat, Chance the Rapper, Nico Segal, Frank Ocean, and Banks.

His music is characterized by a heavy use of electronically produced beats. During live performances, his vocals are backed by pre-produced tracks with the assistance of a DJ, while Francis uses a synthesizer at times. Past performances have included a live band, as depicted in several older music videos. Francis and the Lights released his debut studio album, Farewell, Starlite!, on September 24, 2016.

== Biography ==
Francis Farewell Starlite
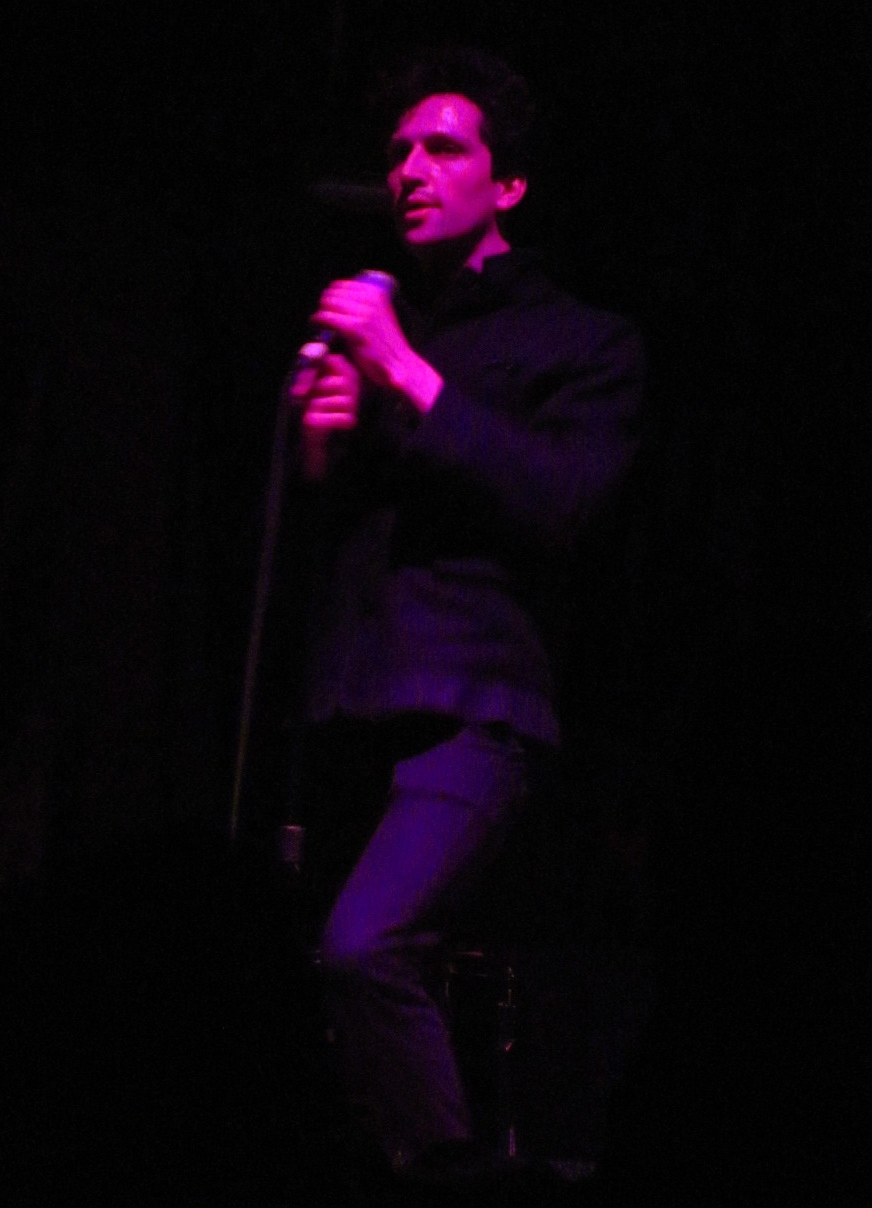
- Starlite performing in 2010

Background information
- Also known as: Francis Starlite; Frank Starlite
- Born: Abe Morre Katz-Milder; June 14, 1981 (age 45); Oakland, California, U.S.
- Genres: Alternative R&B; electronic; avant-garde
- Occupations: Musician; record producer; singer; songwriter; dancer
- Instruments: Vocals; piano; keyboards; synthesizer
- Years active: 1999–present

=== Early life and education ===
Starlite was born Abe Morre Katz-Milder on June 14, 1981, in Oakland, California. He was raised in Berkeley and attended Berkeley High School, where he befriended future collaborators and Francis and the Lights members Rene Solomon and Jake Schreier. In 1999, Starlite enrolled at Wesleyan University in Middletown, Connecticut, where he became friends with future collaborator Jake Rabinbach. Starlite ultimately dropped out in 2002. MGMT's Andrew VanWyngarden and Ben Goldwasser also attended Wesleyan at the same time.

=== Personal life ===
Starlite legally changed his name to Francis Farewell Starlite in 2004. When asked in an interview with Entertainment Weekly why he had done so, he answered:

Let me think about how I want to answer that question. Let me think for a moment. [One minute passes] It's very difficult because I'm very proud of the fact that I changed my name. It has meaning to me. I believe that people change, and that you are what you make of yourself. And that that is true. That's true ... I don't want to, I don't want to ... The problem is that I feel like when I start talking about these things, I start to say things that I wouldn't necessarily want to read myself saying. They might be too easily misinterpreted. So I think I'll just leave it at that. I'm proud of the fact that I changed my name. I am what I make of myself.

== Career ==
Starlite began traveling across the United States by train in an effort to find what direction he was going to take his life in. On one of these trips, he made the decision to focus on music. In an interview with Entertainment Weekly in 2010, he said, "I had played music and loved it my entire life, but hadn't fully committed to it. And there was a moment when I wrote down the different things I could do. And then I wrote down, 'I think I'll give the band a go.'" Shortly afterwards, Starlite returned to Oakland, where he lived and worked in a rehearsal space at Soundwave Studios and wrote songs for close to a year. He subsequently drove across the U.S. in a decommissioned postal truck to New York City, where he formed Francis and the Lights. The band rehearsed for an entire year before starting to perform through a series of invitation-only shows.

In 2007, Francis and the Lights self-released their debut EP, Striking. Their second EP, A Modern Promise, came out in August 2008.

On November 3, 2008, Starlite incorporated Francis and the Lights, LLC, as a limited liability company, as an alternative to signing a record deal. This was followed by an investment of $100,000 from the Normative Music Company, giving Francis and the Lights a valuation of $1 million. Normative's president, Jake Lodwick, a friend of Starlite and a co-founder of Vimeo, said, "Francis Starlite is an uncompromising musician and a strong leader. I believe he will bring Francis and the Lights to international stardom. The spectacular live shows, beautiful recordings, and his relentless character back me up." In late 2009, Normative Music Company shut down. Starlite and Lodwick have since collaborated on the music app Keezy.

Francis and the Lights were credited as producing the song "Karaoke" for Canadian rapper Drake, from his 2010 debut album, Thank Me Later. In 2010, they toured with Drake, MGMT, Ke$ha, La Roux, and Mark Ronson. On July 20, 2010, Francis and the Lights released their third EP, It'll Be Better, through Cantora Records. It was produced by Starlite and Jake Schreier. Schreier, once a supporting musician for Francis and the Lights, has directed most of their music videos, and they provided the score for his feature film debut, Robot & Frank (2012). A fourth EP, Like a Dream, came out in 2013. Drake quoted the 2010 Francis and the Lights track "Get in the Car" on his song "Madonna", from his 2015 mixtape If You're Reading This It's Too Late. The phrase "Big as Madonna" was later used on a shirt that was worn by Madonna during her appearance in Drake's 2015 Coachella Valley Music and Arts Festival headlining set.

Starlite works closely with Muxtape founder Justin Ouellette, who has designed several websites and HTML5 music players for Francis and the Lights releases.

In 2016, Francis and the Lights were featured on Chance the Rapper's "Summer Friends", from his third mixtape, Coloring Book. They served as the opening act on the North American tour dates of his Magnificent Coloring World Tour, which ran between September and October 2016. On May 15, 2016, Starlite released a solo piano song titled "Thank You", which was recorded on a phone in Justin Vernon's living room. On July 7, 2016, Francis and the Lights released a music video for the new song "Friends", featuring Bon Iver and Kanye West. On August 13, the band premiered their debut studio album, Farewell, Starlite!, during a performance at the Eaux Claires music festival. It was released on September 24, 2016. The same year, Francis and the Lights performed a cover of "Dear Theodosia" as a duet with Chance the Rapper on The Hamilton Mixtape. A remix of "May I Have This Dance", featuring Chance the Rapper, was released alongside a music video on May 18, 2017. Just for Us, the band's second full-length album, came out in December 2017; Sputnikmusic noted "shades of the Psychedelic Furs and Orchestral Manoeuvres in the Dark".

Francis and the Lights are credited as a producer on the 2018 Kanye West album, ye, for the tracks "I Thought About Killing You", "All Mine", and "Ghost Town". They appear uncredited on the song "I Thought About Killing You," co-written by Starlite, on a loop heard throughout the track. On Kids See Ghosts, a collaboration by West and Kid Cudi under the name Kids See Ghosts, they are also credited as a producer on the song "Feel the Love", which features rapper Pusha T.

The band's third album, Same Night Different Dream, was originally announced for release as Take Me to the Light via a Tumblr post in August 2019. It was subsequently renamed and scheduled for a November 1 issue that was eventually delayed. "Take Me to the Light", featuring Bon Iver and Kanye West, came out as the first single on August 30, 2019. As of 2026, the album has not been published.

Starlite is the inventor of a layered vocal effect he refers to as the "Prismizer". It features prominently on many of his productions, including "Close to You" by Frank Ocean and throughout Coloring Book by Chance the Rapper.

In 2024, the band's song "See Her Out (That's Just Life)" was featured on the soundtrack of the Netflix series Nobody Wants This.

== Discography ==
Studio albums

- Farewell, Starlite! (2016)
- Just for Us (2017)

EPs

- Striking (2007)
- A Modern Promise (2008)
- It'll Be Better (2010)
- Like a Dream (2013)

Soundtracks

- Robot & Frank (2012)
- Always Be My Maybe (2019)

Singles

- "LIME/WYN" (2008)
- "Eiffel Tower" / "The Things That I Would Do" (with inc.) (2011)
- "Friends" (featuring Bon Iver and Kanye West) (2016)
- "See Her Out (That's Just Life)" (2016)
- "May I Have This Dance" (remix featuring Chance the Rapper) (2017)
- "Scream So Loud (Lammer Dance Mix)" (2018)
- "Try Tho We Might To" (2018)
- "The Video in the Pool" (2018)
- "Do U Need Love?" (2019)
- "Take Me to the Light" (featuring Bon Iver and Kanye West) (2019)
- "For Days (Sike)" (with Spencer Sike) (2021)

Compilation appearances

- "Can't Tell Me Nothing" (cover of Kanye West's "Can't Tell Me Nothing"), Guilt by Association Vol. 2 (2008)
- "Dear Theodosia" (with Chance the Rapper, The Hamilton Mixtape) (2016)

Featured appearances

- "Karaoke" (Drake, Thank Me Later) (2010)
- "Something Better" (Lyrics Born, As U Were) (2010)
- "Celebration" (Das Racist, Relax) (2011)
- "Chameleon/Comedian" (Kathleen Edwards, Voyageur) (2012)
- "Wonderful Everyday: Arthur" (Chance the Rapper with the Social Experiment) (2014)
- Surf (Nico Segal & the Social Experiment) (2015)
- "Summer Friends" (Chance the Rapper featuring Jeremih) (2016)
- "Wild Love" (Cashmere Cat featuring the Weeknd, 9) (2016)
- "IT'S ALRITE 2 CRY" (Kool A.D. featuring Francis Farewell Starlite, HAVE A NICE DREAM) (2016)
- Merry Christmas Lil' Mama (Jeremih and Chance the Rapper) (2016)
- ye (Kanye West) (2018)
- "Feel the Love" (Kids See Ghosts featuring Pusha T, Kids See Ghosts) (2018)
- "Just for Us, Pt. 2" (Benny Blanco, Friends Keep Secrets) (2018)
- "Forgiven" (2 Chainz featuring Marsha Ambrosius, Rap or Go to the League) (2019)
- Intellexual (Nico Segal) (2019)
- "Look What You're Doing to Me" (Banks, III) (2019)
- "To Someone Else" (Kacy Hill) (2019)
- The Big Day (Chance the Rapper) (2019)
- "I CRY 3" (93PUNX, 93PUNX) (2019)
- "For Your Eyes Only" (Cashmere Cat, Princess Catgirl) (2019)
- "Selah" (Kanye West, Jesus Is King) (2019)
- "I Believe in You" (Kacy Hill, Is It Selfish If We Talk About Me Again) (2020)
- "Song of Trouble" (CARM featuring Sufjan Stevens, CARM) (2021)
