= DreamCrew =

Canadian film and TV production company

DreamCrew Entertainment
- Type: Private
- Industry: Production company
- Founded: 2017; 9 years ago
- Founder: Drake; Adel "Future" Nur
- Headquarters: Los Angeles, California
- Area served: Worldwide
- Parent: DreamCrew IP, LLC
- Divisions: DreamCrew Creative; DreamCrew Management
- Subsidiaries: Nocta; Better World Fragrance House; Luna Luna
- Website: dreamcrew.com

DreamCrew Entertainment is a multi-disciplinary media company co-founded by Drake and Adel "Future" Nur in 2017, based in the U.S. and works globally. The company functions as both a management company and entertainment group, housing a production company and content studio, known for the HBO television series Euphoria and the Netflix series Top Boy.

== History ==
In 2017, Drake and Adel "Future" Nur teamed up with LeBron James and Uninterrupted to produce the sports documentary The Carter Effect which discusses the impact of Vince Carter in Canada.

In 2019, Drake and Nur served as executive producers for the HBO teen drama series Euphoria and the revival of the British crime drama series Top Boy distributed by Netflix. Later in 2019, the co-founders produced the Showtime documentary Ready for War. In September 2019, DreamCrew filed a US trademark application for a design resembling Health Canada's tetrahydrocannabinol (THC) warning label.

Drake and Nur served as executive producers on the dark comedy film Spree, released on January 24, 2020. In March 2020, it was announced that Drake will executive produce the Quibi adaptational series The 48 Laws of Power alongside Nur and Jason Shrier of DreamCrew, with Anonymous Content. In 2021, DreamCrew co-produced the HBO series Chillin Island created by Josh Safdie. The series featured guest appearances from artists including Young Thug, Lil Yachty, Rosalía, Gunna, Killer Mike, Coi Leray, and Vampire Weekend, among others. In 2022, they executive produced the documentary film Black Ice.

== Divisions ==
=== DreamCrew Creative ===
DreamCrew Creative is a multi-disciplinary creative studio and is co-venture between Drake and Adel Nur. It oversees business projects such as the clothing brand Nocta and the scented candles company Better World Fragrance House. In 2022, it was announced that DreamCrew invested $100 million to revive the amusement park Luna Luna for a global tour in association with Live Nation.

== Filmography ==
=== Films ===
Year	Title	Directed by	Co-producers	Distributor
2017	The Carter Effect	Sean Menard	Uninterrupted	Netflix
2019	Ready for War	Andrew Renzi	Cedar Park Entertainment, Entertainment One, North of Now Group, Prettybird	Showtime
2020	Spree	Eugene Kotlyarenko	Forest Hill	RLJE Films
2022	Amsterdam	David O. Russell	Regency Enterprises, Keep Your Head Productions, Corazon Hayagriva Productions	20th Century Studios
2022	Black Ice	Hubert Davis	SpringHill Company, Uninterrupted Canada	Bell Media, Elevation Pictures (Canada)
2026	Fear of Missing Out	Theo Skudra, Zong Li, Liam Macrae, Jake Schreier, and Glenn Michael	—N/a	
2026	Madden	David O. Russell	Escape Artists, ShowKat, Corazon Camera	Amazon MGM Studios

=== Television ===
Year	Title	Creator	Co-producers	Network
2019–2026	Euphoria	Sam Levinson	A24, The Reasonable Bunch, Little Lamb, Tedy Productions	HBO
2019–2023	Top Boy	Ronan Bennett	SpringHill Entertainment	Netflix
2021–present	Chillin Island	Josh Safdie	Elara Pictures, Spotify	HBO
2023	Saint X	Leila Gerstein	Anonymous Content, ABC Signature	Hulu
2023	Dear Mama	Lasse Järvi	A Defiant Ones Media Group Production, An Amaru Entertainment Production, MACRO	FX
2027	Neuromancer	Graham Roland and J. D. Dillard	Anonymous Content, Skydance Television	Apple TV
