= Fear of Missing Out (film) =

- Directed by: Theo Skudra; Zong Li; Liam Macrae; Jake Schreier; Glenn Michael
- Produced by: Theo Skudra
- Starring: Drake
- Cinematography: James Arthurs
- Production company: DreamCrew
- Distributed by: YouTube
- Release date: September 15, 2026
- Running time: 59 minutes
- Country: Canada
- Language: English

Fear of Missing Out (stylized as FOMO) is a 2026 Canadian short film directed by Theo Skudra, Zong Li, Liam Macrae, Jake Schreier, and Glenn Michael. It stars Canadian rapper and singer Drake, who described Fear of Missing Out as a "not-so-short film directed and scored by the family." It was self-released on YouTube on September 15, 2026. Four songs featured in the film were released on October 2, as part of the Habibti (FOMO) deluxe edition.

== Background and rollout ==
Speculation around Fear of Missing Out began quietly in mid-2026. The phrase first appeared in Drake's promotional materials as early as July 19, 2025, when he used the caption "Fear of Missing Out" to promote a Nike and NOCTA collaboration.

On August 12, 2026, Drake posted a carousel of old family photographs on Instagram captioned "FOMO 2026." On September 3, he followed with an image resembling the back of a CD jewel case reading "Fear of Missing Out" in all capital letters, accompanied only by a film camera emoji, before later posting an Instagram Story confirming the September 15 YouTube date. The ambiguous rollout led fans and outlets to speculate about a possible new album, deluxe edition, documentary, tour announcement, or a rumored project referred to as Scary Hours 4, before Drake ultimately confirmed the project was a film.

The rollout followed shortly after Drake's simultaneous release of three albums in May 2026, Iceman, Habibti, and Maid of Honour, and came during the same period the final Iceman promotional livestream had revealed the two surprise companion albums shortly before their release. In the weeks leading up to the announcement, Drake was seen filming near a Ferris wheel at Toronto's Canadian National Exhibition while wearing an Iron Man suit, further fueling fan speculation.

== Teaser and premiere ==
On September 12, 2026, Drake shared a teaser trailer for the film on Instagram. The clip shows Drake riding a neon green speedboat across open water as a female narrator states: "What if I told you there were two versions of your life? In one, you avoid risk and withhold love. You feel like you've gone missing from yourself. You look for something you can't find. In the other version of your life, you find it." The teaser closes with a black-and-white poster card for the film.

Variety reported that the film's total scope was not fully clear from the teaser, though it noted the possibility of new Drake music given his description of the project as being "scored by the family." Billboard noted that Drake had similarly used elaborate rollout tactics in the past, citing the 25-foot ice sculpture he installed in a Toronto parking lot ahead of the Iceman release as an earlier example.

== Reception ==
Following the teaser's release, fans reacted with enthusiasm across social media.
