= Take Me to the Light =

Single by Francis and the Lights featuring Bon Iver and Kanye West

from the album Same Night Different Dream
- Released: August 30, 2019
- Genre: Synth-pop
- Length: 4:15
- Label: KTTF Music
- Songwriters: BJ Burton; Benjamin Levin; Caroline Shaw; Francis Farewell Starlite; Jeff Bhasker; Justin Vernon; Kanye West; Magnus Høiberg; Noah Goldstein
- Producers: Kanye West; BJ Burton; Benny Blanco; Cashmere Cat; Jeff Bhasker; Noah Goldstein; Francis Farewell Starlite

Francis and the Lights singles chronology
"Do u Need Love?" (2019)	"Take Me to the Light" (2019)

Bon Iver singles chronology
"Faith" (2019)	"Take Me To The Light" (2019)	"Exile" (2020)

Kanye West singles chronology
"I Love It" (2018)	"Take Me To The Light" (2019)	"Follow God" (2019)

"Take Me to the Light" is a song by American pop project Francis and the Lights featuring Bon Iver and Kanye West. It is the lead single from their forthcoming album, Same Night Different Dream. The song marks the second collaboration between all three artists following the 2016 single "Friends." It also features additional contributions from Caroline Shaw and uncredited vocals by Chance the Rapper. It was released as a single on August 30, 2019, but did not appear on most streaming services until September 3, 2019.

The song was briefly taken down from streaming services in April 2020, with a new version (featuring additional vocals by Chance the Rapper) being uploaded to Francis' website. This version was uploaded to streaming services in September 2020, removing Bon Iver and Kanye's featuring credits and renamed as "You Still Take Me To The Light".

== Track listing ==
No.	Title	Length
1.	"Take Me to the Light"	4:15
