= Ye (album) =

Studio album by Kanye West
- Released: June 1, 2018
- Recorded: 2017–May 2018
- Studios: West Lake Ranch, Jackson Hole, Wyoming
- Genre: Hip-hop
- Length: 23:41
- Labels: GOOD; Def Jam
- Producers: 7 Aurelius; Benny Blanco; Francis and the Lights; Irv Gotti; Kanye West

Kanye West chronology
The Life of Pablo (2016)	Ye (2018)	Kids See Ghosts (2018)

Singles from Ye
- 1. "Yikes" Released: June 8, 2018; 2. "All Mine" Released: July 24, 2018

Ye (/jeɪ/ YAY; stylized in all lowercase) is the eighth studio album by the American rapper Kanye West. It was released on June 1, 2018, by GOOD Music and Def Jam Recordings. West began working on it in 2017, but restarted it after a controversial interview with TMZ in May 2018, completing it over a period of two weeks. Guest appearances include Ty Dolla Sign, Kid Cudi, 070 Shake, Charlie Wilson, Jeremih, PartyNextDoor, and Nicki Minaj. (Note: PartyNextDoor is the only guest credited as a featured artist.)

Ye was the second of five 2018 albums produced by West in Jackson Hole as part of the "Wyoming Sessions", succeeding Pusha T's Daytona and preceding West and Kid Cudi's Kids See Ghosts, Nas's Nasir, and Teyana Taylor's K.T.S.E.. Ye is a hip-hop album, with music critics describing its sound as rushed and messy. Its themes and lyrics explore West's mental health. West discusses his bipolar disorder, struggles with suicidal and homicidal ideation, thoughts on women, experiences with psychedelic drugs, and fears about fatherhood.

Ye received generally favorable reviews from critics, who frequently compared it to West's previous work. They praised its subject matter and production, though the lyrical content garnered mixed responses, and some found it inconsistent. Ye was supported by two singles, "Yikes" and "All Mine", in mid-2018; both attained top 20 positions on the US Billboard Hot 100 chart. Multiple publications named Ye among 2018's best albums, though it was not nominated for the Grammy Award for Best Rap Album.

Ye was West's eighth consecutive album to debut at number one on the US Billboard 200, tying him with Eminem's record. It also topped the charts in Australia, Canada, Estonia, Ireland, and New Zealand, and attained top five positions in the Czech Republic, Denmark, Iceland, the Netherlands, Norway, Sweden, and the United Kingdom. Ye has been certified platinum and gold in the United States and the UK by the Recording Industry Association of America (RIAA) and British Phonographic Industry (BPI), respectively.

== Background and recording ==
On February 24, 2016, Kanye West tweeted that his eighth studio album would be released during the summer of that year under the title of Turbo Grafx 16, naming it after the video game console of the same name. West associate Ibn Jasper posted a photo on Instagram showing West with longtime collaborators Mike Dean, Plain Pat, and Kid Cudi in a recording studio working on the album. In March 2016, Quavo posted an image on his Instagram of him in a studio with West, with "TURBO GRAFX 16" written on the wall behind them. A number of other artists were present in the image, including Lil Yachty, Big Sean, and Tyler, the Creator. The expected release of the album in the summer of 2016 was not met, while West began his Saint Pablo Tour in August that year, in support of his seventh studio album The Life of Pablo that had been released in February. The tour ended abruptly in November, with 22 out of 41 dates being cancelled, after West, on his Sacramento stop, embarked on a rant lasting roughly 20 minutes, ending the show.

In May 2017, news began to surface that West was working on his new album "on top of a mountain in Wyoming" in seclusion. In March 2018, similar reports had emerged through various artists, including West himself, who was being spotted in Jackson Hole, Wyoming, with a release date being expected for either 2018 or 2019 at the time. A number of other artists were pictured or rumored, including Kid Cudi, Nas, King Louie, Pi'erre Bourne, ASAP Bari, Wheezy, The-Dream, Travis Scott and the World Famous Tony Williams. In April 2018, West met with Rick Rubin, who had executive produced West's previous two studio albums, Yeezus (2013) and The Life of Pablo (2016). The meeting occurred at West's office in Calabasas, following on from him recording in Wyoming, having bought a property in the latter named Monster Lake Ranch for recording and renamed it West Lake Ranch. That same month, West previewed the album for radio host Charlamagne tha God. West announced the album's planned release date of June 1, 2018, on April 19, simultaneously revealing it to include seven tracks. On April 28, 2018, West tweeted out a text conversation between him and Wes Lang. The text conversation included West showing the initial cover for the album, and an explanation of its concept, followed by him asking for help naming the album. Lang replied, "LOVE EVERYONE", to which West replied "I love that". The presented cover art showed plastic surgeon Jan Adams who performed a liposuction and mammoplasty operation on West's mother, Donda, which led to complications and eventually her death a day after. Within the texts, West explained that he wanted to "forgive and stop hating". On April 30, Adams responded to the news of the cover in the form of an open letter, asking West to "cease and desist using my photo or any image of me to promote your album or any of your work" while noting his willingness to sit down with West for a face to face conversation. West responded to the letter on his Twitter saying, "This is amazing. Thank you so much for this connection brother. I can't wait to sit with you and start healing".

West returned to Wyoming in May 2018 for the recording of then-upcoming albums, which were later referred to as the "Wyoming Sessions". Outside of his own albums, West also executive produced and provided guest vocals for all of the albums by other artists that came out of the sessions, with him having announced taking on the role of producer beforehand. American rapper Pusha T released his third studio album, Daytona, on May 25, 2018, as the first album from the recordings. West released Ye on June 1 as the second album of the sessions. Prior to referencing mental health on the album, West had mentioned it within his music in the past, especially on The Life of Pablo. On June 8, 2018, a week after Ye's release, Kids See Ghosts, the hip-hop duo consisting of West and Kid Cudi, released their eponymous studio album Kids See Ghosts. A sequel to Ye track "Ghost Town", entitled "Freeee (Ghost Town, Pt. 2)", is included on the album, with the sequel featuring vocals from American singer Ty Dolla Sign. West revealed via Twitter that the former was originally slated for release on Kids See Ghosts. On June 15, 2018, American rapper Nas released his eleventh studio album, Nasir, as the fourth album from the sessions. American singer Teyana Taylor released her second studio album, K.T.S.E., on June 23 as the fifth and final album of the "Wyoming Sessions".

In an interview conducted during the listening party for Ye, West stated that he "redid the whole album after TMZ," referring to a controversial interview with the tabloid news website in May 2018, during which he made controversial comments about slavery, and suggested that the entire album was re-recorded in a month. Referencing the recording process, West claimed that initially: "Everything was going perfect. As soon as stuff stopped going so perfectly, I was like, 'I know what to do with this energy. I know exactly what to do with this.'" On June 4, 2018, West's wife Kim Kardashian reconfirmed this and revealed that two weeks were spent re-recording Ye. Of her presence in the studio, Kardashian said: "I left to go home for, like, two days and then I come back and it was a whole new album. It's fascinating to see the process." The following day, featured artist 070 Shake said in an interview that the album was still being worked on up until the day before it came out. She elaborated, revealing that West was "very calm" while completing recording sessions in a few hours. As well as 070 Shake, the album includes guest contributions from Ty Dolla Sign, Ant Clemons, Jeremih, Kid Cudi, Charlie Wilson, Caroline Shaw and Nicki Minaj. Though all of the other contributions are guest vocals, Minaj contributed a voicemail to "Violent Crimes". Ye was updated on streaming services on November 8, 2018, with the uncredited sample of Kareem Lotfy's recording "Fr3sh" being removed from the track "I Thought About Killing You". In a 2022 interview Mike Dean echoed the sentiments; "In Wyoming, for the Ye album, we had 10 songs, I guess. And we were trying to do a seven-song album. I came in one day and he'd erased the whole board and said, 'We're starting over.' That's what happened. And we did it in like two weeks. We made seven songs and it came out pretty good."

== Music and composition ==
Writing for Rolling Stone, Brendan Klinkenberg characterized Ye as a hip-hop album, though viewed it as the opposite "of a laser-focused statement album". Lindsay Zoladz of The Ringer noted the album's rushed sound, describing it as what "has a slapdash, unfinished quality about it, like a 10-page paper written in a shaky hand on the bumpy morning bus ride to school". For The Line of Best Fit, Ross Horton similarly stated that Ye "just sounds like it hasn't been finished", specifically noting the track "Wouldn't Leave". Douglas Greenwood from NME wrote that the album "lacks the profundity of My Beautiful Dark Twisted Fantasy and the audacity of 808s or Yeezus", calling the sound "succinct and easy to swallow".

Steven Hyden compared the composition of the tracks on Ye to West's previous works in Uproxx, expressing the viewpoint that none of them stand out "as a decisive break with what he's done before". Clayton Purdom of The A.V. Club claimed that the old West is present on Ye "bringing plump, stirring soul samples". He elaborated, writing that "if you missed the new Kanye, there's plenty of abrasive, Yeezus-style abstraction, too", and noted the inclusion of multitudes on the album. Writing for The Observer, Kitty Empire viewed the work as "veering between sparse, hyper-modern styles and compositions which hark back to the soulful bent" of West's early career. Lucy Jones of The Daily Telegraph noted certain works as being reminiscent of West's third studio album Graduation (2007), viewing the piano chords and Slick Rick sample on the track "No Mistakes" as "old-school West," which she also pointed to certain vocals on "Ghost Town" as being.

== Themes and lyrics ==
Ye gives a look into the psyche of West, with the character of the artist being focused on. The album includes references to the rapper's mental health, with a large amount of it seeing him unravel his mind, and "Ghost Town" is specifically linked to the theme. The theme contrasts The Life of Pablo's delving into the darker corners of fame and family, with Ye being more uncomfortable in comparison. West's bipolar disorder and suicidal thoughts are mentioned on the album, which are in relation to the theme of mental health. According to Rapzilla magazine's Elijah Matos, the album is among the select mainstream examples of hip-hop that examines mental health similar to the younger waves of contemporary emo and Christian rap artists. Ye also includes West expressing his thoughts towards women.

The album's opener, "I Thought About Killing You", sees West confess to thoughts of both suicide and homicide. West delivers spoken word over a backing vocal within the opener for a couple of minutes until the beat changes and he switches to rapping. "Yikes" includes West referencing his experiences with psychedelic drugs, as well as his struggle with mental health. Within "All Mine", West moves "into more explicit territory" and raps about having interest in multiple dating options. West uses "Wouldn't Leave" to reference his controversial comments about slavery, and his relationship with Kardashian. "No Mistakes" includes a series of self-righteous outbursts, coming from the perspective of a multi-millionaire in West. The mind of the rapper is presented as being in the process of unravelling within "Ghost Town", which is in reference to his mental health state. West raps about fears towards fathering his daughter within "Violent Crimes".

== Release and promotion ==
On April 27, 2018, after West traveled to Wyoming and made subsequent album announcements, he announced the release of the track "Lift Yourself". That same day, the track was released on West's website, with it seeing West rap nonsensical words. West premiered a track two hours after "Lift Yourself" titled "Ye vs. the People", which features fellow rapper T.I. During an interview with The Breakfast Club in May 2018, Pusha T claimed that a version of "Lift Yourself" with actual lyrics exists and indicated that it could be released on the album. However, Ye was later released without the song included. A song titled "Extacy" was part of the original track list for Ye as the second track, though it was ultimately replaced by "Yikes" in the final release. "Extacy" was later released under the title of "XTCY" on August 11, 2018.

Ye was released for digital download and streaming worldwide on June 1, 2018, through West's labels GOOD Music and Def Jam. The album was later released as a CD in various countries by the aforementioned labels on July 20, 2018. On June 8, it was revealed that Ye was slated to be released on vinyl in the summer of 2018 and pre-orders were made available simultaneously, while the vinyl release ultimately occurred in various countries on July 27, 2018, through West's labels. This marked the first official vinyl release for an album by West since his collaborative studio album Watch the Throne with Jay-Z in 2011. However, West's previous two albums Yeezus and The Life of Pablo were heavily bootlegged on vinyl.

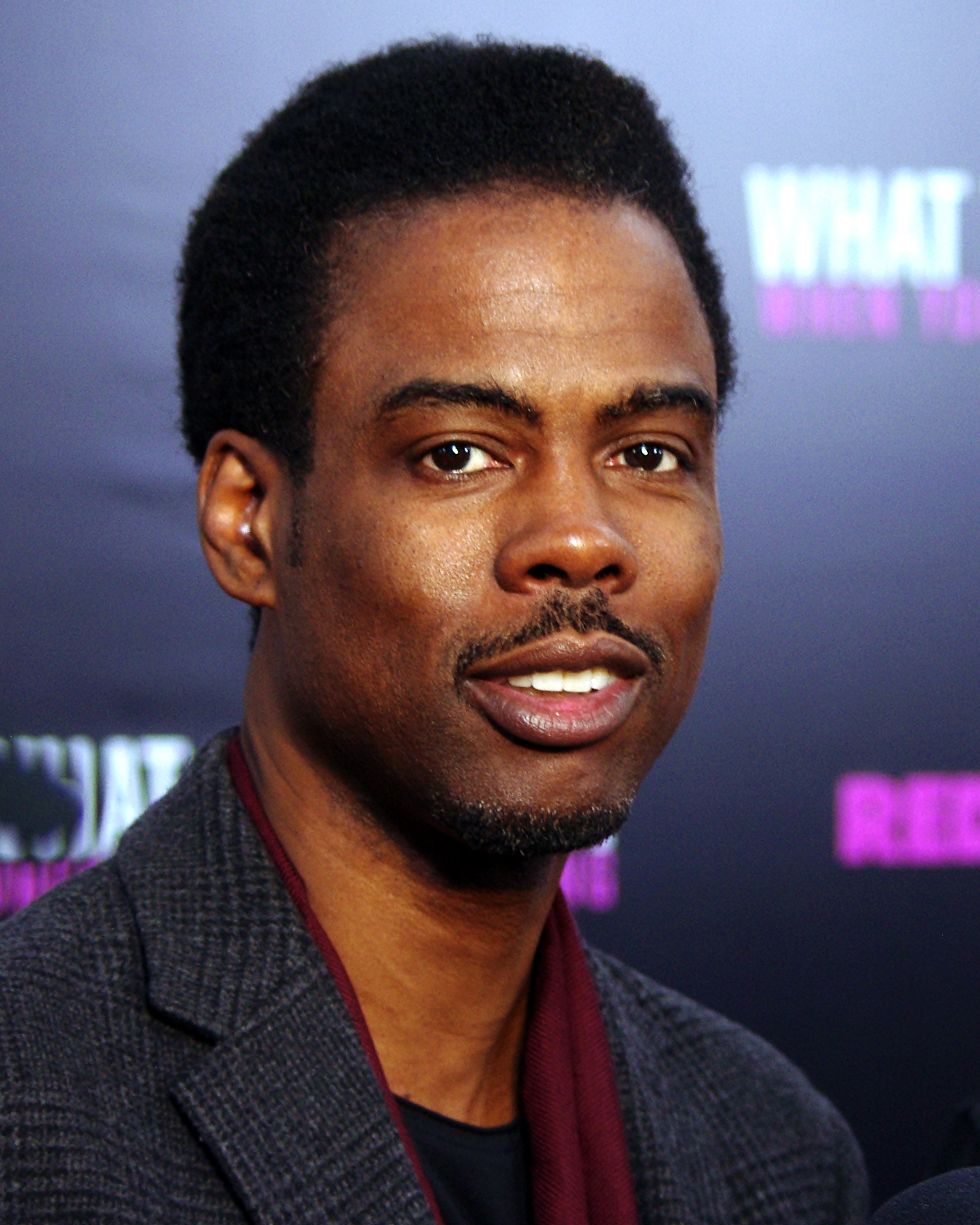
Chris Rock announced the album as being titled Ye and narrated the video of the listening party on West's website.

A two-hour listening party took place for Ye on the night of May 31, 2018, in Jackson Hole, with West broadcasting a livestream of the party through the WAV app. West invited a variety of guests and contributors to the listening party, including Ty Dolla Sign, Kid Cudi, Nas, Pusha T, Desiigner, 2 Chainz, Big Sean, and Cyhi the Prynce, among others. Members of Def Jam's staff mobilized and organized people from various locations around the world for the party, though the number of people originally planned to fly out for it was 300 until it was ultimately halved. At the location of the listening party, the album's title was announced as being Ye by American comedian Chris Rock, shortly before the party began.

=== Promotional videos ===
By June 6, 2018, West's official website had been updated to include footage from the listening party for Ye. A promotional video of the listening party was played on the website, set to the album tracks "I Thought About Killing You" and "Ghost Town". Rock provided narration for the video. West's website was later updated on October 22, 2019, in promotion of his ninth studio album Jesus Is King.

No music videos were released for Ye, but lyric videos for the tracks "All Mine" and "Violent Crimes" were officially released simultaneously on June 19, 2018. Both of the tracks were treated as singles from the album with the promotion, despite not having been released as such at the time. The videos include the lyrics being written out on the same Wyoming mountain range displayed on the artwork for Ye, while the lyrics are in the same font used for the text on the artwork.

=== Singles ===
West initially debuted Ye on June 1, 2018, without any singles. On June 8, "Yikes" was released to UK mainstream radio stations by West's labels as the lead single from the album. Three days later, it was revealed that West had to choose a lead single in the United States for promotion. Simultaneously, the song was revealed to have been selected by West for release as a single in the US. It was serviced to US radio stations through West's labels as the lead single on June 11, 2018. Prior to release as a single, the song charted at number eight on the US Billboard Hot 100, standing as West's first solo track to enter the top 10 of the Hot 100 since the single "Heartless" in 2008 and becoming his 16th top 10 single on the chart. After having been released as a single, the song made its debut at number 10 on the UK Singles Chart, standing as West's 19th top 10 single on the chart. On August 14, 2019, "Yikes" was certified platinum in the US by the Recording Industry Association of America (RIAA) for sales of 1,000,000 certified units. The song was later certified gold in the United Kingdom by the British Phonographic Industry (BPI) for selling 200,000 units.

West went on to select "All Mine" for release as the second single from Ye on July 20, 2018, which features vocals by Ty Dolla Sign and Clemons. This decision was made by West due to his labels preparing a track for such a release to block a momentum loss for the album after "Yikes" experienced a lack of success on record charts. However, the track's lyric video had been released in promotion over a month before it was selected for release as a single. On July 24, 2018, the track was sent to US rhythmic contemporary radio stations through West's labels as the second single. The track entered at number 11 on the Billboard Hot 100, prior to being released as a single. That same week, the track debuted at an identical position on the UK Singles Chart. "All Mine" was certified double platinum in the US by the RIAA for pushing 2,000,000 certified units on June 28, 2021. On March 6, 2020, the track was certified silver in the UK by the BPI for sales of 200,000 units.

Both of the singles stood as West's first entries in the top 10 of the US Hot R&B/Hip-Hop Songs chart since "All Day" reached number six in 2015. "Yikes" and "All Mine" gave West his 25th and 26th tracks to attain top 10 positions on the chart, entering at number seven and nine, respectively. Though "Yikes" charted higher than "All Mine", the latter remained on the Billboard Hot 100 longer; it spent nine weeks on the chart, while the former only remained on the Hot 100 for five weeks.

== Artwork and title ==
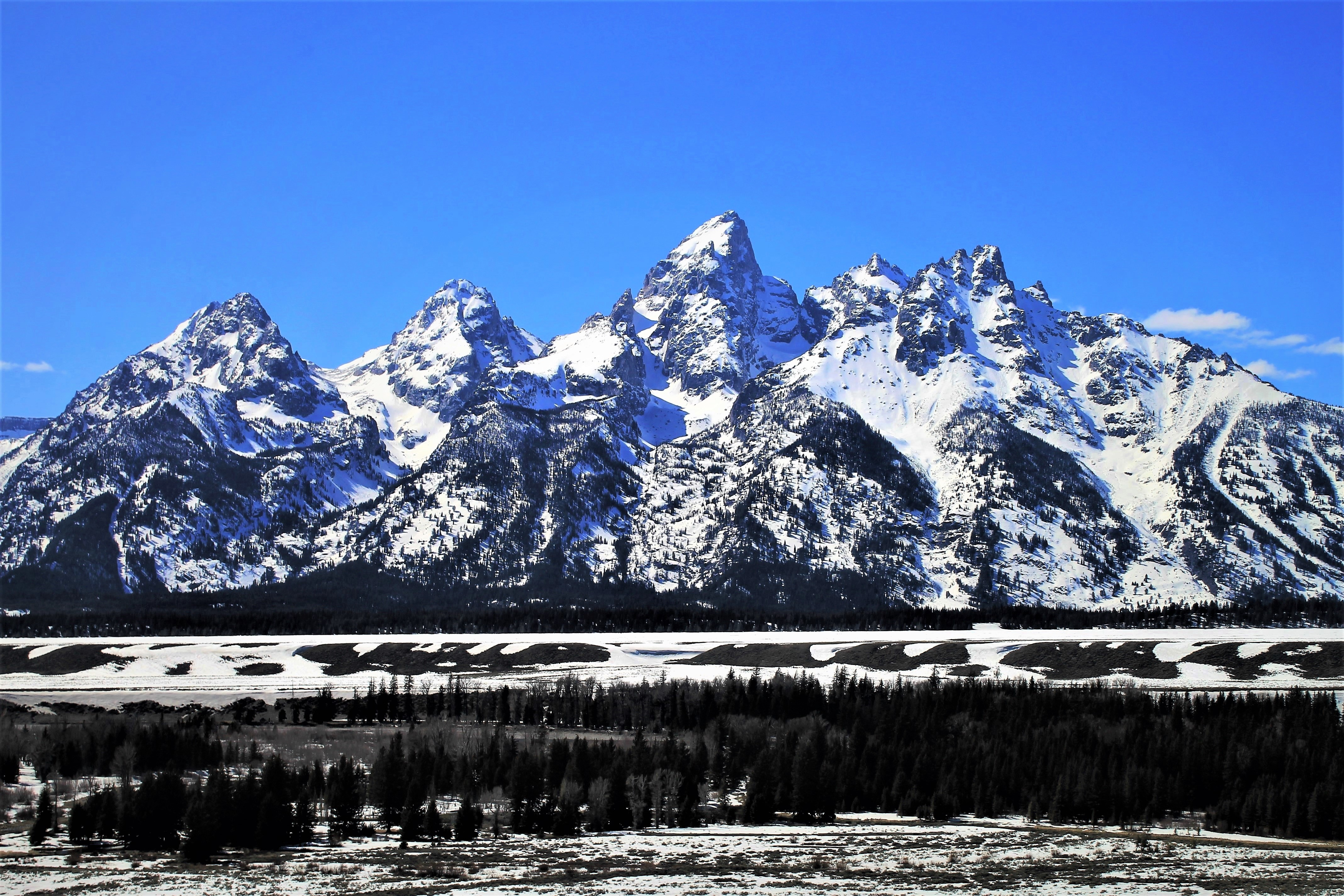
View of the Teton Range from the Jackson Hole valley, similar to the view depicted on the cover

The artwork for Ye was revealed by Kardashian to have been taken by West on his iPhone on their way to the listening party on May 31, 2018, hours before the release of the album. It features a view of the Teton Range from Jackson Hole, the mountain range where the album was recorded and produced. The mountainous terrain photographed is natural, though it is questionable whether the artwork includes a skyline or not within the area that the terrain is present on it. The text on the artwork reads: "I hate being / Bi-Polar / its [sic] awesome," which is scribbled in neon green over the mountain range. With the inclusion of the phrase on the artwork, West confirmed his bipolar disorder.

In an interview conducted with Big Boy during the listening party for the album, West explained the title, which is a diminutive of his own name commonly used in his songs, by stating:

I believe ye is the most commonly used word in the Bible, (Note: The most common word in the Bible is and, with numerous others being more popular than ye.) and in the Bible it means you. So, I'm you, I'm us, it's us. It went from Kanye, which means 'the only one,' to just Ye – just being a reflection of our good, our bad, our confused, everything.

West went on to tweet in June 2018 that without his ego, he is "just Ye", a potential point of reference for the album title.

In November 2018, N.O.R.E. reported on the podcast Drink Champs that the album was rumored to have originally been named Hitler after the Nazi dictator. In October 2022, CNN cited anonymous sources as saying that West originally suggested calling the album Hitler, alleging that West had displayed a fascination with Hitler and his rise to power, would talk about the "great things he and the Nazi Party achieved for the German people", openly read Hitler's book Mein Kampf (1925), and expressed admiration for Hitler and the Nazis' use of propaganda. Years after the album's release, West would later draw international condemnation for publicly making comments that were antisemitic and pro-Hitler.

== Critical reception ==
Ye ratings
Aggregate scores
Source	Rating
AnyDecentMusic?	6.1/10
Metacritic	64/100
Review scores
Source	Rating
AllMusic	2.5/5 stars
The A.V. Club	B
The Daily Telegraph	4/5 stars
Entertainment Weekly	C+
The Guardian	4/5 stars
The Independent	2/5 stars
NME	3/5 stars
The Observer	3/5 stars
Pitchfork	7.1/10
Rolling Stone	2.5/5 stars

According to the review aggregator Metacritic, Ye received "generally favorable reviews" based on a weighted average score of 64 out of 100 from 34 critic scores. Aggregator AnyDecentMusic? gave it 6.1 out of 10, based on their assessment of the critical consensus.

Alexis Petridis for The Guardian stated the album doesn't feel slight but opined that it is exhausting. Petridis wrote: "Substantially more focused than its predecessor, it packs a lot into 23 minutes. It is bold, risky, infuriating, compelling and a little exhausting: a vivid reflection of its author." Jones looked at Ye as "an album about Kanye's state of mind, his family, and a narration of what's been going on in his 'shaky-ass year.' The beats are great. Lyrically, it's fine. Whatever you think of his politics, his songwriting, sample-hunting and beat-making remain dynamic, surprising and ballsy." Purdom claimed that West "can still create thunderous blasts of sound on par with anyone on the planet, and Ye's best moments are reminders of that. It's a prismatic album, reflecting its creator's entire body of work—and also whatever you think about him going in." Writing for Time, Maura Johnston compared West's previous projects to the album, saying that "the one thing they've consistently focused on is contrast: light and dark, ugly and beautiful, self-aggrandizing and self-loathing." She added that it "resembles his last album, The Life of Pablo in which Ye doesn't deviate too much from the lyrical concepts of Pablo; it blends the trivial and the life-or-death, like on the darkened-club 'Yikes,' on which he declares his bipolar syndrome to be his 'superpower' and compares the U.S.-North Korea tensions to his long-simmering beef with Wiz Khalifa." Kyle Mullin from Exclaim! wrote that "if West had better delved into his emotional and psychological turmoil in Ye's lyrics, instead of getting bogged down with click-baity asides, then this LP would've been a classic."

Eric Brown was less enthusiastic in Billboard, stating: "It's tough to ignore Ye's musical stasis; known for his forward motion, on this set, West remains mired in the past," also commenting that "It's a missed opportunity in the sense that it fails to measure up to his previous work and change the conversation around him." For AllMusic, Neil Z. Yeung expressed mixed feelings, writing that the album "can feel uneven, sometimes boring, and more indulgent than usual, but it's a fascinating peek into West's psyche." Similarly, Wren Graves of Consequence believed that "on Ye, he's consolidating old skills, not testing out new ones," adding that "the lack of wow-factor, combined with the short length, makes the album feel somewhat slight." Rob Sheffield of Rolling Stone described the album as "wildly uneven" with "enough sporadic flashes of brilliance to make you hungry for much, much more." Slant Magazine's Zachary Hoskins viewed the album as what "just feels unfinished, as if he wanted to avoid another debacle like the rollout of the also-unfinished The Life of Pablo" and called it "a mix of the weakest moments from The Life of Pablo." Horton wrote negatively of the album, claiming that "there's no through-line. No concept. No consistency. There's certainly no quality control." Robert Christgau gave the album a one-star honorable mention in a capsule-review column for Vice, calling it a "half-assed attempt to make asshattery germane again."

=== Accolades ===
Ye appeared on year-end best album lists for 2018 by multiple publications. On the Pitchfork Readers' Poll: Top 50 Albums of 2018, the album was voted in at number 37. Ye was listed at number four on the website's polls for most underrated and most overrated album of the year, respectively. It was ranked at the same position on GQ Russia's list of 2018's best albums. The Edge and Jon Caramanica of The New York Times both listed the album as the seventh best of the year. Ye was ranked by NME as the 34th best album of 2018, with the staff writing that "there's plenty in this experimental, weird little album that suggests Kanye has very much still got it." 411Mania named Ye the 42nd best album of the year, with David Hayter of the website claiming that despite the "serious faults" of the album, it is an "endlessly listenable collection," calling the music "too coherent and sonically satisfying to quibble over." Ye was ranked as the 30th best hip-hop album of 2018 by Rolling Stone even though the staff viewed it as West's worst album, writing that "West, at his worst, is still making more fascinating music than almost anyone else," and the staff elaborated, calling the album "a dense and, at times, brilliant piece of music." However, in February 2023, Rolling Stone ranked Ye at number one on their list of the 50 Genuinely Horrible Albums by Brilliant Artists, writing that the "chaotic, half-baked album" "marks the beginning of the most disastrous artistic and personal collapse in the history of popular music". In August 2022, Complex ranked Ye as the worst album of his discography up to that point.

On April 25, 2018, West tweeted out: "I'm turn the Grammys into the Yammys," predicting success for himself at the 2019 Grammy Awards. West's work on Ye and other projects earned him a nomination for Producer of the Year, Non-Classical at the ceremony. However, the album wasn't nominated for Best Rap Album at the Grammys, with the lack of a nomination being viewed as a snub by multiple publications. In an article for Consequence, Lake Schatz was surprised by West being snubbed even though he called Ye "hardly the best in his catalog" and questioned "whether the lack of even a nomination has to do partially with the MC's especially divisive nature in 2018." At the 2019 Fonogram Hungarian Music Awards, the album earned a nomination for Best Foreign Rap or Hip-Hop Album of the Year.

== Commercial performance ==
Ye debuted at number one on the US Billboard 200 with 208,000 album-equivalent units, of which 85,000 were pure album sales, becoming the fifth-largest weekly units for an album in 2018. The album was West's eighth consecutive chart topper on the Billboard 200, tying him with Eminem's streak from 2000 to 2018 and English band the Beatles' streak from 1965 to 1968 as one of only three acts to accumulate eight consecutive number one albums. West also became the only other act apart from Eminem to achieve eight consecutive number one debuts, since none of the albums from the Beatles' streak debuted atop the Billboard 200. The sales surpassed the first week projections of 175,000 to 190,000 album-equivalent units and up to 80,000 pure sales. Ye recorded the second largest per-track streaming average ever, receiving 25.7 million on-demand audio streams. The seventh-largest streaming debut week ever was experienced with 120,000 streaming equivalent albums, with the streams being counted at over 180 million.

The album descended four places to number five in its second week on the Billboard 200 and dropped 65% in sales, moving 74,000 album-equivalent units. This became the second highest decrease in sales for an album's second week of 2018, standing behind the 73% decline of American musician J. Cole's fifth studio album KOD; however, the second week sales for KOD were higher than those of Ye, with 105,000 units having been pushed. The album also entered atop the US Top R&B/Hip-Hop Albums chart, giving West his eighth consecutive number one debut on the chart. In 2018, it was ranked as the 50th and 30th most popular album of the year on the Billboard 200 and Top R&B/Hip-Hop Albums charts, respectively. On September 30, 2021, Ye received a platinum certification from the RIAA for amassing 1,000,000 certified units in the US.

Ye debuted atop the ARIA Albums chart, giving West his second chart-topping album in Australia and replacing fellow rapper Post Malone's second studio album Beerbongs & Bentleys at the top position. This made West the third major hip-hop act to have an album reach the top 10 of the chart in 2018, joining J. Cole with KOD and ASAP Rocky with his third studio album Testing. A Streaming Equivalent Album Value being taken into account for the Album Chart calculations in Australia helped Ye top the ARIA Albums chart, since the value counts the streams for all tracks of albums 10 tracks or less, rather than the two most streamed tracks as done for longer albums. The album was also a chart topper on the Irish Albums Chart, giving West his first number one album in Ireland. By reaching the same position on the New Zealand Albums chart, Ye became West's second number one album in the country. The following week, it remained at the top position. The album also debuted at number one on the Canadian Albums Chart, with 16,000 total consumption units, though it reached the second highest album sales and on-demand streams of the week. This became West's sixth chart-topping album in Canada, while also standing as his first since Yeezus. In Estonia, Ye entered at number one on the Albumid tipp-40 and remained atop the chart the following week.

Ye entered at number two on the UK Albums Chart, being held off the top spot by The Greatest Showman: Original Motion Picture Soundtrack, which denied West a number one album on the issue that coincided with his 41st birthday. However, the album was the most played album of the week on streaming services, and it was reported that 80% of sales came from streams. On May 21, 2021, Ye was certified gold in the UK by the BPI for sales of 100,000 units. The album also attained the chart position of number two on both the Danish Albums Chart and Norwegian Albums Chart. Similarly, Ye reached number three on the Czech Albums, Icelandic Albums, and Netherlands' Dutch Album Top 100 charts. On the Swedish Albums chart, the album reached number five.

All seven tracks from Ye debuted in the top 40 of the Billboard Hot 100, with lead single "Yikes" charting the highest at number eight. The tracks entering the Hot 100 lead to West's total number of top 40 entries amounting to 48, placing him joint-10th with fellow rapper Jay-Z on the list for most top 40 entries on the chart, and also making West the 11th act with as many as seven simultaneous top 40 Hot 100 entries. West topped the US Billboard Artist 100 for the first time in his career, partially as a result of the entries from the album, surpassing his previous peak position of number three that was attained as a result of The Life of Pablo. The two tracks "Ghost Town" and "All Mine" charted in the top 40 of the UK Singles Chart, along with "Yikes"; the latter of the three was the highest charting from Ye at number 10.

== Track listing ==
Ye track listing
No.	Title	Writer(s)	Producer(s)	Length
1.	"I Thought About Killing You"	Kanye West; Mike Dean; Francis Farewell Starlite; Benjamin Levin; Cydel Young; Dexter Mills; Malik Yusef; Richard Cowie; Joseph Adenuga Olaitan; Kenneth Preshon; Terrence Boykin	West; Francis and the Lights; Benny Blanco; Dean^{[a]}; Andy C^{[a]}; Aaron Lammer^{[a]}	4:34
2.	"Yikes"	West; Dean; James Mbarack Achieng; Ayub Ogada; Aubrey Graham; Young; Mills; Danielle Balbuena; Jordan Jenks; Asten Harris; Yusef; Preshon; Boykin; Jordan Thorpe	West; Dean^{[c]}; Pi'erre Bourne^{[a]}; Apex Martin^{[a]}	3:08
3.	"All Mine"	West; Dean; Starlite; Young; Mills; Jeremih Felton; Balbuena; Ant Clemons; Uforo Ebong; Tyrone Griffin Jr.; Yusef; Preshon; Boykin; Thorpe	West; Dean^{[c]}; Francis and the Lights^{[a]}; Scott Carter^{[a]}	2:25
4.	"Wouldn't Leave" (featuring PartyNextDoor)	West; Dean; Reverend W.A. Donaldson; Griffin; Justin Vernon; Jahron Brathwaite; Starlite; Yusef; Noah Goldstein; Felton; Preshon; Boykin; Thorpe	West; Ty Dolla Sign^{[c]}; Dean^{[a]}; Goldstein^{[a]}	3:25
5.	"No Mistakes"	West; Dean; Edwin Hawkins; Ricky Walters; Che Pope; Young; Yusef; Preshon; Boykin	West; Pope^{[c]}; Caroline Shaw^{[c]}; Dean^{[a]}; Eric Danchick^{[a]}	2:03
6.	"Ghost Town" (featuring PartyNextDoor)	West; Dean; Trade Martin; Shirley Ann Lee; Brathwaite; Young; Mills; Balbuena; Starlite; Yusef; Carole Bayer Sager; Helen Jayne Culver; Goldstein; Preshon; Boykin; Thorpe	West; Dean^{[c]}; Francis and the Lights^{[a]}; Benny Blanco^{[a]}; Goldstein^{[a]}	4:31
7.	"Violent Crimes"	West; Balbuena; Dean; Kevin Parker; James Ireland (Note: Though Pond drummer James Ireland didn't receive credit on the song, he was confirmed to have contributed to it by a rep for Kevin Parker.); Griffin; Yusef; 7 Aurelius; Irving Lorenzo; Thorpe	West; Irv Gotti; 7 Aurelius	3:35
Total length:				23:41

Notes

- ^{^[c]} signifies a co-producer
- ^{^[a]} signifies an additional producer

Sample credits

- The original version of "I Thought About Killing You" contained an uncredited sample of "Fr3sh", performed by Kareem Lotfy.
- "Yikes" contains a sample from "Kothbiro", written by James Mbarack Achieng and Ayub Ogada, and performed by Black Savage.
- "Wouldn't Leave" contains a sample from "Baptizing Scene", performed by Reverend W.A. Donaldson.
- "No Mistakes" contains a sample from "Children (Get Together)", as performed by Edwin Hawkins Singers; and "Hey Young World", written and performed by Slick Rick.
- "Ghost Town" contains elements of "Take Me for a Little While", written by Trade Martin, as performed by the Royal Jesters; and a sample of "Someday", as performed by Shirley Ann Lee.

== Personnel ==
Credits adapted from Tidal and Qobuz.

Vocals

- Ty Dolla Sign – vocals (3, 4, 7)
- Ant Clemons – vocals (3)
- Jeremih – vocals (4)
- Kid Cudi – vocals (5, 6)
- Charlie Wilson – vocals (5)
- Caroline Shaw – vocals (5)
- 070 Shake – vocals (6, 7)
- Nicki Minaj – voice (7)

Technical

- Jess Jackson – mixer
- Mike Dean – mixer, engineer
- Mike Malchicoff – engineer
- Zack Djurich – engineer
- Andrew Dawson – engineer, programming (2, 7)
- Noah Goldstein – engineer (2, 6), recording engineer (4)
- William J. Sullivan – engineer (5)
- Mauricio Iragorri – recording engineer (6)
- Sean Solymar – assistant recording engineer (1–5)
- Mike Snell – assistant remix engineer (track 7)

== Charts ==
=== Weekly charts ===
Chart performance for Ye
Chart (2018)	Peak position
Australian Albums (ARIA)	1
Australian Urban Albums (ARIA)	1
Austrian Albums (Ö3 Austria)	12
Belgian Albums (Ultratop Flanders)	6
Belgian Albums (Ultratop Wallonia)	18
Canadian Albums (Billboard)	1
Czech Albums (ČNS IFPI)	3
Danish Albums (Hitlisten)	2
Dutch Albums (Album Top 100)	3
Estonia (Eesti Tipp-40)	1
Finnish Albums (Suomen virallinen lista)	10
French Albums (SNEP)	19
German Albums (Offizielle Top 100)	25
German Albums (Top 20 Hip Hop)	6
Icelandic Albums (Tónlistinn)	3
Irish Albums (IRMA)	1
Italian Albums (FIMI)	18
Japan Hot Albums (Billboard Japan)	47
Lithuanian Albums (AGATA)	33
New Zealand Albums (RMNZ)	1
Norwegian Albums (VG-lista)	2
Portuguese Albums (AFP)	43
Scottish Albums (Official Charts)	13
Slovak Albums (ČNS IFPI)	4
Spanish Albums (Promusicae)	59
Swedish Albums (Sverigetopplistan)	5
Swiss Albums (Schweizer Hitparade)	7
UK Albums (Official Charts)	2
UK R&B Albums (Official Charts)	1
US Billboard 200	1
US Top R&B/Hip-Hop Albums (Billboard)	1

=== Year-end charts ===
2018 year-end chart performance for Ye
Chart (2018)	Position
Australian Albums (ARIA)	58
Belgian Albums (Ultratop Flanders)	118
Canadian Albums (Billboard)	47
Danish Albums (Hitlisten)	91
Estonian Albums (Eesti Tipp-100)	52
Icelandic Albums (Tónlistinn)	31
New Zealand Albums (RMNZ)	41
US Billboard 200	50
US Top R&B/Hip-Hop Albums (Billboard)	30

2019 year-end chart performance for Ye
Chart (2019)	Position
Australian Urban Albums (ARIA)	52

2021 year-end chart performance for Ye
Chart (2021)	Position
Icelandic Albums (Tónlistinn)	82

2022 year-end chart performance for Ye
Chart (2022)	Position
Icelandic Albums (Tónlistinn)	70

2023 year-end chart performance for Ye
Chart (2023)	Position
Icelandic Albums (Tónlistinn)	65

2024 year-end chart performance for Ye
Chart (2024)	Position
Icelandic Albums (Tónlistinn)	73

== Certifications ==
Certifications and sales for Ye
Region	Certification	Certified units/sales
Denmark (IFPI Danmark)	Gold	10,000^{‡}
Italy (FIMI)	Gold	25,000^{‡}
Poland (ZPAV)	Gold	10,000^{‡}
United Kingdom (BPI)	Gold	100,000^{‡}
United States (RIAA)	Platinum	1,000,000^{‡}
^{‡} Sales+streaming figures based on certification alone.

== Release history ==
Release dates and formats for Ye
Region	Date	Label(s)	Format(s)	Ref.
Various	June 1, 2018	GOOD; Def Jam	Digital download; streaming	
Various	July 20, 2018	GOOD; Def Jam	CD	
Various	July 27, 2018	GOOD; Def Jam	Vinyl	

== See also ==
- 2018 in hip-hop
- GOOD Fridays
- List of number-one albums of 2018 (Australia)
- List of number-one albums of 2018 (Canada)
- List of number-one albums of 2018 (Ireland)
- List of UK top-ten albums in 2018
- List of UK R&B Albums Chart number ones of 2018
- List of Billboard 200 number-one albums of 2018
- List of Billboard number-one R&B/hip-hop albums of 2018
- List of number-one albums from the 2010s (New Zealand)
