= Zerobridge =

- Origin: New York City, New York, U.S.
- Genres: Alternative rock, indie rock
- Years active: 2001–2017
- Members: Mubashir Mohi-ud-Din ("Din")- songwriter, lead singer, rhythm guitar player; Mohsin Mohi-ud-Din ("Mo")- drums; J. P. Bowersock- lead guitar; Greg Eckelman- bass
- Past members: Paolo Arao; Jay Barclay; Kristin Fayne Mulroy; Kenji Shinigawa

Zerobridge was a New York-based indie alternative/rock band from 2001–2017 founded by brothers Mubashir (songwriter, lead singer, and rhythm guitarist) and Mohsin (drums) Mohi-ud-Din. The band draws its name from the actual bridge in Srinagar, the capital of Kashmir. Greg Eckelman was added to the lineup on bass in 2004. Between 2002-2011, the band went through a series of lineup changes including: Kristin Fayne Mulroy (bass, 2002-2003), Kenji Shinigawa (lead guitar, 2004), Jay Barclay (lead guitar, 2007-2009), and Paolo Arao (keyboards, 2008-2010). In 2005 Earl Slick produced the band and joined them for a series of live dates in Lower Manhattan. In 2011, noted Strokes production consultant/ guitar teacher / 'guru'/ 'sensei' J. P. Bowersock joined the lineup as producer and lead guitar player.

== No Epiphany (2001) ==
No Epiphany was Zerobridge's first self-released EP. The tracks on this recording include "No Epiphany", "Ice Candy Man", and "Bleed". "Ice Candy Man" references a main character from the novel "Cracking India" by Bapsi Sidhwa, which was later turned into the film, "Earth," directed by Deepa Mehta. “Bleed” is a 12 and a half minute instrumental which samples “Chalte, Chalte,” composed by Ghulam Muhammad for the film Pakeezah, a popular 1972 "Bollywood" film. The cover photography was taken by writer/photographer Maryam Reshi.

== Zerobridge, aka The Basement Tapes (2003) ==
Zerobridge's debut full-length album

The band's first full-length debut was self-titled and recorded at Phase Recording Studios in College Park, MD and at Spike Recording Studios in New York City from 2002 to 2003. The songs were directly inspired by Kashmir and the brothers' travels there in December 2001, a tense time in the region after 9/11 and a terrorist attack that was carried out on the Indian parliament. Songs such as "Suffering Moses" (which reappears on the 2007 EP, Havre de Grace),"Nothing Doing," and "Refugee Citizen" offer a glimpse of life in the midst of the Kashmir conflict. "Nazar" is influenced by the book, “The Tiger Ladies,” by Kashmiri author Sudha Kohl. "In Exile" is an experiment of the Ghazal, a poetic structure in Urdu, transposed into English form and influenced by famed Kashmiri poet Agha Shahid Ali, writer Salman Rushdie and professor, writer, and philosopher Edward Said. The cover photo was taken in Kashmir in 1989 by Amar Talwar, a prominent actor in India. The self titled album came to be known as The Basement Tapes. Music from The Basement Tapes was inspired by song structures and melodies from the likes of guitar based rock bands like Tom Petty and The Heartbreakers, The Beatles, and Oasis mixed with Indian instrumentation, rhythms, and samples. The song structure of "Refugee Citizen" borrows heavily from The Velvet Underground's "I'm Waiting for the Man."

== The Earl Slick Sessions (2004–2005) ==
Former John Lennon and David Bowie guitarist, Earl Slick, teamed up with the band from 2004–2005 to play live with them and record demos with the intention of securing a record deal. Earl Slick provided all the lead guitar work on these unreleased recordings in addition to production, with the mixing assistance of Mark Plati. The song "It Is What It Is" was recorded for the first time during these sessions. It was inspired by the play The South Asian Monologues, in which lead singer Din played one of the lead characters, Zain.

== Havre de Grace (2007) ==
In the fall of 2007, Zerobridge released their third EP, Havre de Grace, whose sound was more stripped down, capturing the band as a 3-piece, and reflected the music of bands like The Clash and U2. The title song takes its name from Havre de Grace, Maryland, a town near where the brothers grew up. "Havre de Grace" would go on to be included in independent films "The Messenger" (2009) and "Amira and Sam" (2015). The "Havre de Grace" video was directed by Musa Syeed, winner of the 2007 Tribeca Film Festival Best Documentary Short award and director of feature-length film "Valley of Saints" (2012), for which Din would compose the musical score.

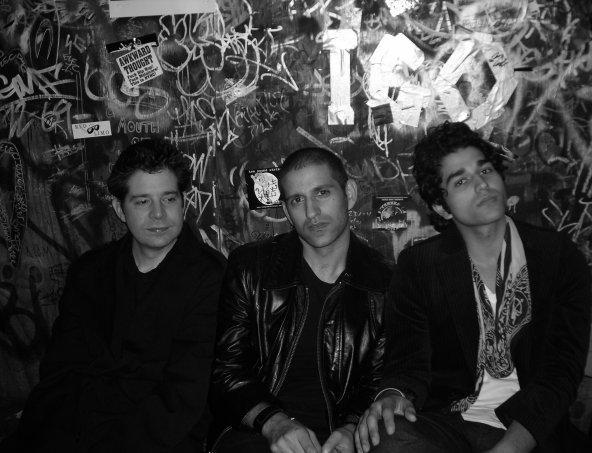
Zerobridge, backstage at CBGB, 2006

"Late Bloomer" would be included in the independent film "Slakistan." "The Shake" is a direct confrontation to Islamic extremism from a songwriter of Muslim background. "This Is My Version" was remixed from The Earl Slick Sessions and includes the rhythm guitar work of Earl Slick.

== There We Were, Now Here We Are (2009) ==
After self-releasing a single every month for the last half of 2008, the band released a six-song EP titled There We Were, Now Here We Are in 2009.

== Big Songs for Small Spaces (2015) ==
In 2011, Zerobridge added record producer J. P. Bowersock to its lineup and began recording songs in Chinatown, Manhattan over the course of four years on a minimal budget. On August 21, 2015, they released their full-length album titled Big Songs for Small Space. To promote the album in advance, the band released its lead single "Ten Years" on December 8, 2014.
