= Luna Luna (1987 exhibition) =

Art project and amusement park by André Heller

Luna Luna was an open-air museum and amusement park in Hamburg, West Germany that ran from June 4 to August 31, 1987; it was rediscovered and relaunched as a touring exhibition in 2023. Curated by Austrian artist André Heller, it was an attempt to "create a travelling terrain of modern art, that in the centuries-old principle of the fairground involves people of all ages and educational levels in playful acts". Heller commissioned around 30 contemporary artists to design the attractions, including Jean-Michel Basquiat, Keith Haring, Roy Lichtenstein, Salvador Dalí, David Hockney, Kenny Scharf, Roland Topor, Jean Tinguely, and Sonia Delaunay. After decades in storage, the works were restored and new works were commissioned for Luna Luna: Forgotten Fantasy, which embarked on a global tour in 2023 with funding from DreamCrew.

== Formation ==
In the mid-1980s, André Heller began to recruit artists for his project Luna Luna, an amusement park designed by the "most important artists of the period". Heller received a $500,000 grant from the magazine Neue Revue. Heller turned down an offer from McDonald's to buy into the project, saying "we don't want to set up a Disneyland". He collaborated with 32 artists for a project that was described by Life magazine as the "most dizzying, dazzling art show on Earth". Heller paid the artists $10,000 each, stating that the reason why all those renowned artists participated for so little money was because he told them: "Listen, you are constantly getting the greatest commissions, everyone wants your paintings or sculptures, but I am inviting you to take a trip back to your own childhood. You can design your very own amusement park, just as you think would be right today, and really without exception everyone answered by saying, sure, that's a nice pleasant challenge."

While some of the artists traveled to West Germany for the project, others sent their designs to Vienna, where a specialist team of technicians and theater painters, carpenters and architects carried out the work. There were around 30 attractions, which included a walk-in "shadow room" by Georg Baselitz, a musical "enchanted tree" by David Hockney, and boldly colored glass labyrinth by Roy Lichtenstein. Keith Haring designed a carousel, with the seats in the shape of cartoon characters, and painted the whole thing with his icons and symbols. Jean-Michel Basquiat designed a Ferris wheel composed of his various drawings, which prominently featured the rear-end of a baboon. Kenny Scharf created six comic sculptures and painted more than 100 individual pictures in a Viennese workshop, which were mounted around a brightly colored swing carousel. Other attractions included a Sonia Delaunay-designed entrance gate, Salvador Dalí's "reflective pavilion" and a hand painted circus wagon by August Walla. Each attraction had its own individual music. Philip Glass composed the music for Lichtenstein's glass labyrinth. Karajan recorded a CD with the Berlin Philharmonic for Hockney's room. Basquiat chose the album Tutu by Miles Davis.

As a tribute to Joseph Beuys, who died in January 1986, Heller had a manifesto drawn up that the artist had authorized a few years prior. Heller also contributed some works. In addition to the "wedding pavilion" and a "head-through-the-wall booth", he had a blue-red "dream station" built as a coffee house. Reportedly, Andy Warhol also wanted to take part, but other American artists objected. Warhol, who died in February 1987, was memorialized with a booth where visitors were allowed—based on Warhol's credo 15 minutes of fame—to be photographed next to life-size pictures of Albert Einstein, Marilyn Monroe or Marlene Dietrich.

== Exhibition catalog ==
In 1987, Heller released the book Luna Luna, published by Wilhelm Heyne Verlag in Munich, which features all of the attractions. For the book cover, Heller asked the participating artists to draw a moon and add a sentence they found fitting.

In 2023, the book was re-released by Phaidon in its first English translation, titled Luna Luna: The Art Amusement Park, with an updated preface by Heller.

== Exhibition venues ==
Luna Luna was initially only displayed once at the Moorweide in Hamburg from June 4 to August 31, 1987. The entry fee was 20 Deutsche Marks (children free on weekdays). The attendance was 300,000 in three months.

The exhibition had been expected to travel to the Netherlands later in 1987 and then the United States in 1988. In 1991, Luna Luna, was to be temporarily installed at Balboa Park's Inspiration Point in San Diego, California. The eighteen month-long run was to be a gift from the Stephen and Mary Birch Foundation, based in Wilmington, Delaware. Ensuing litigation due to a claimed breach of contract prevented Luna Luna from being exhibited. The entire exhibit was packed into 44 shipping containers and stored on a desert ranch in Texas.

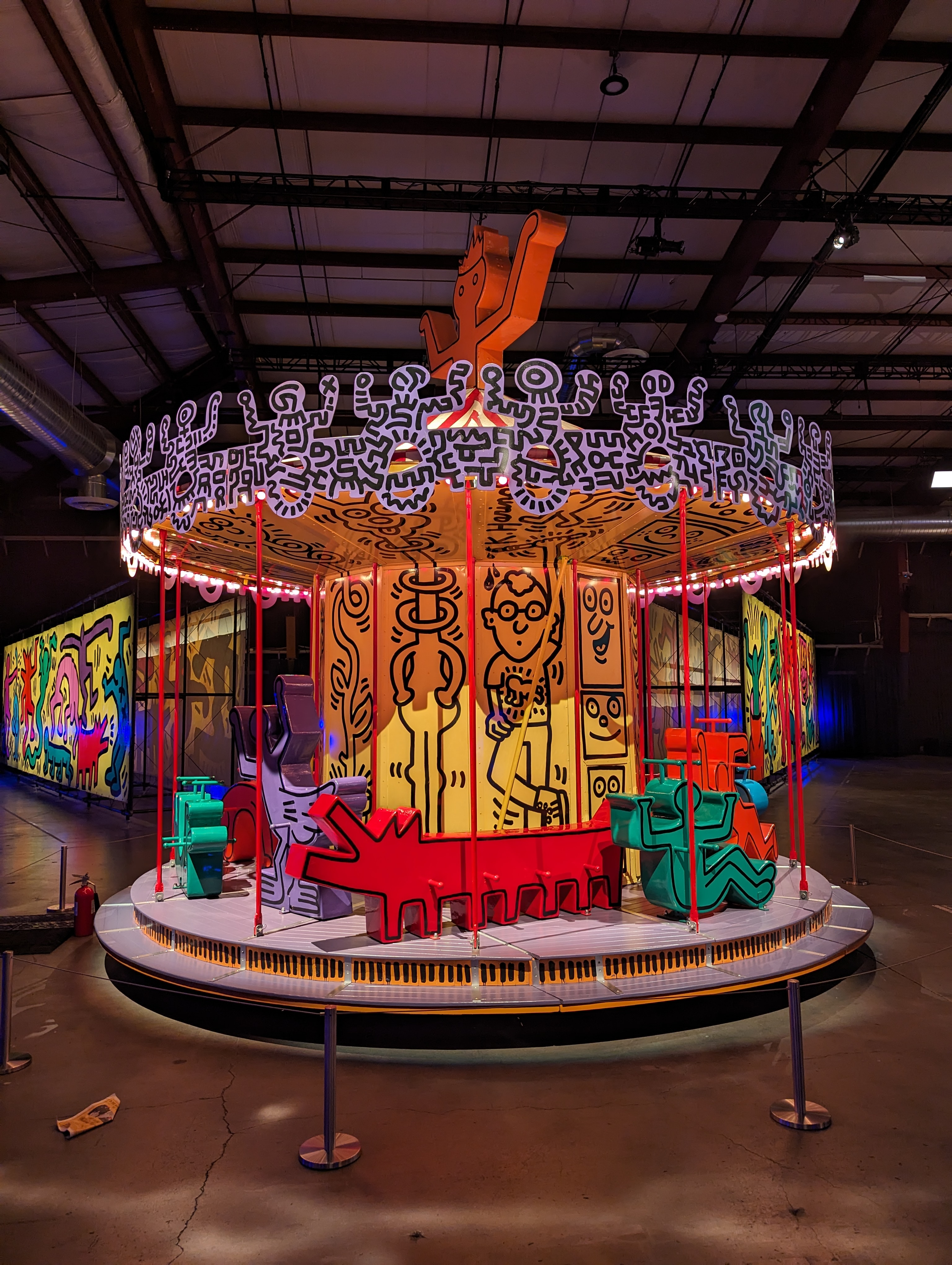
Carousel designed by Keith Haring for Luna Luna art project and amusement park.

In 2022, Luna Luna was revived for a global tour by Canadian rapper Drake and his entertainment firm DreamCrew with production assistance from Live Nation. The show, Luna Luna: Forgotten Fantasy, includes original rides, games, and attractions. About half of the 30 attractions designed by the original artists were displayed. The original rides could not be ridden due to modern safety concerns. Several of the displays available for viewing during the latest staging of the show required an additional entry fee for access.

The revived exhibition opened in December 2023 and ran through spring 2024 in the Boyle Heights neighborhood of downtown Los Angeles within a warehouse space. From November 20, 2024, through March 16, 2025, 13 displays from the exhibition were installed in The Shed at Hudson Yards in Manhattan, New York City.
