= Valley of Saints (film) =

- Directed by: Musa Syeed
- Screenplay by: Musa Syeed
- Produced by: Nicholas Bruckman
- Starring: Mohammed Afzal; Gulzar Ahmed Bhat; Neelofar Hamid
- Cinematography: Yoni Brook
- Edited by: Ray Hubley; Mary Manhardt
- Music by: Mubashir Mohi-ud-Din
- Release date: 23 January 2012 (Sundance Film Festival)
- Country: India
- Language: Kashmiri

Valley of Saints is a 2012 Indian film in Kashmiri language directed by Musa Syeed. Syeed's directorial debut is a romantic film set in Dal Lake, Srinagar, which also raises an environmental issue surrounding the lake. It won the Sundance Film Festival World Dramatic Audience Award in 2012. It tied for the Alfred P. Sloan Prize with the American film Robot & Frank.

== Plot ==
In war-torn Kashmir, a lakeside city is plunged into a military curfew. Stranded together on breathtaking Dal Lake. War and poverty force Gulzar, a young tourist boatman (shikarawala) at Dal Lake, to run away from Kashmir with his best friend. But a military crackdown derails their escape, and they become trapped in Gulzar's lake village. Waiting for conditions to change, they discover a mysterious woman, Asifa, a scientist braving the curfew to research pollution levels in the lake. As Gulzar falls for her, rivalry and jealousy threaten his boyhood friendship and their plans of escape. Gulzar must choose between a new life and a new love. The first film set in the endangered lake communities of Kashmir, Valley of Saints blends fiction and documentary to bring audiences inside this unique world.

== Development and production ==
The director of the film, Musa Syeed, grew up in US, where his father had migrated in the 1970s, after being a political prisoner in Kashmir. Sayeed visited Kashmir in 2009 and stayed for a year, living at a houseboat on Dal lake, gathering information and developing film ideas, eventually he set the film around the Dal lake, as an allegory for Kashmir.

He first cast a local boatman, Gulzar Bhat, as the film's lead, followed by Mohammed Afzal and Neelofar Hamid, who play lead roles in the film. The film was shot during uprising of 2010, where much of the area was under curfew, and crew stayed on houseboats over the lake and script was changed to include scenes of curfew and violence, minimum crew was used to avoid attention.

The film is scored by NY based indie alternative/rock band Zerobridge's Mubashir Mohi-ud-din, J. P. Bowersock, and also features songs like 'Nightingale's Lament (Gulzar Bhat)' rendering poetry of Rasul Mir, and the song 'Boulevard' penned by Makhanlal Bekas.

== Cast ==
- Mohammed Afzal as Afzal
- Gulzar Ahmed Bhat as Gulzar
- Neelofar Hamid as Asifa

== Reception and recognition ==
The film opened at 2012 Sundance Film Festival, where it won the Sundance Film Festival World Dramatic Audience Award and also the Alfred P. Sloan Prize, tied with the American film Robot & Frank.
