= Robot & Frank =

2012 film directed by Jake Schreier

- Theatrical release poster
- Directed by: Jake Schreier
- Screenplay by: Christopher D. Ford
- Produced by: Lance Acord; Sam Bisbee; Jackie Kelman-Bisbee; Galt Niederhoffer
- Starring: Frank Langella; Susan Sarandon; Peter Sarsgaard; James Marsden; Liv Tyler
- Cinematography: Matthew J. Lloyd
- Edited by: Jacob Craycroft
- Music by: Francis and the Lights
- Production companies: Stage 6 Films; Park Pictures; White Hat Entertainment; Dog Run Pictures
- Distributed by: Samuel Goldwyn Films
- Release dates: January 20, 2012 (Sundance); August 24, 2012 (United States)
- Running time: 89 minutes
- Country: United States
- Language: English
- Budget: $2.5 million
- Box office: $4.9 million

Robot & Frank is a 2012 American science fiction comedy-drama film directed by Jake Schreier (in his directorial debut) from a screenplay by Christopher D. Ford. The film stars Frank Langella, Susan Sarandon, Peter Sarsgaard, James Marsden, and Liv Tyler.

Robot & Frank was the first feature film for both Schreier and Ford, and received critical acclaim for its writing, production, and acting. It won the Alfred P. Sloan Prize at the 2012 Sundance Film Festival, tying with the Kashmiri film Valley of Saints by Musa Syeed.

The robot was created by Tony Gardner's special effects company Alterian, Inc.

== Plot ==
Set in the near future, aging ex-convict and thief Frank Weld lives alone and suffers from increasingly severe mental deterioration and dementia. Frank's son Hunter, an attorney with a family of his own, grows tired of making weekly visits to his father's home without his kids, but is reluctant to put his father into full-time care, so he purchases a robot companion, which is programmed to provide Frank with therapeutic care, including a fixed daily routine and cognition-enhancing activities like gardening.

Initially wary of the robot's presence in his life, Frank warms up to his new companion when he realizes the robot is not programmed to distinguish between legal recreational activities and criminal ones, and can assist him in lock-picking. Together, the two commit a heist in order to win the affection of the local librarian, Jennifer: they steal an antique copy of Don Quixote from the library, which is being renovated and turned into a community center in the wake of declining interest in print media.

In the meantime, Frank's daughter Madison, who is away on a philanthropic trip in Turkmenistan, learns of the robot and returns to convince her father to get rid of the machine, which she finds ethically objectionable. Frank insists on keeping the robot, and they commit one last heist, stealing jewels from Jake, the rich young developer at the head of the library renovation project. The police become involved and begin to question and monitor Frank, who maintains his innocence, feigning deathly illness so that Hunter will return to see him. In order to cover his tracks, Frank is faced with the decision of whether to wipe the memory of his robot, even as his own memory rapidly deteriorates.

Frank goes to the library where he discovers that Jennifer is his ex-wife, which he had forgotten. He then returns home where the robot convinces him to wipe its holographic memory; it argues that it is not a real person and its sole reason for existence is to help Frank, which it can best do by helping him avoid jail. Frank then moves into a full-time care facility to help him cope with his dementia. During a visit from his family, he slips Hunter a note, implying that the jewels are hidden under the tomato plants in the garden that the robot made.

== Cast ==
- Frank Langella as Frank Weld
- James Marsden as Hunter Weld
- Liv Tyler as Madison Weld
- Jeremy Strong as Jake
- Jeremy Sisto as Sheriff Rowlings
- Peter Sarsgaard as Robot (voice)
  - Rachael Ma as Robot Performer
- Susan Sarandon as Jennifer Weld
- Ana Gasteyer as Shop Lady
- Katherine Waterston as Shopgirl
- Joshua Ormond as Flattop

== Production ==
=== Development ===
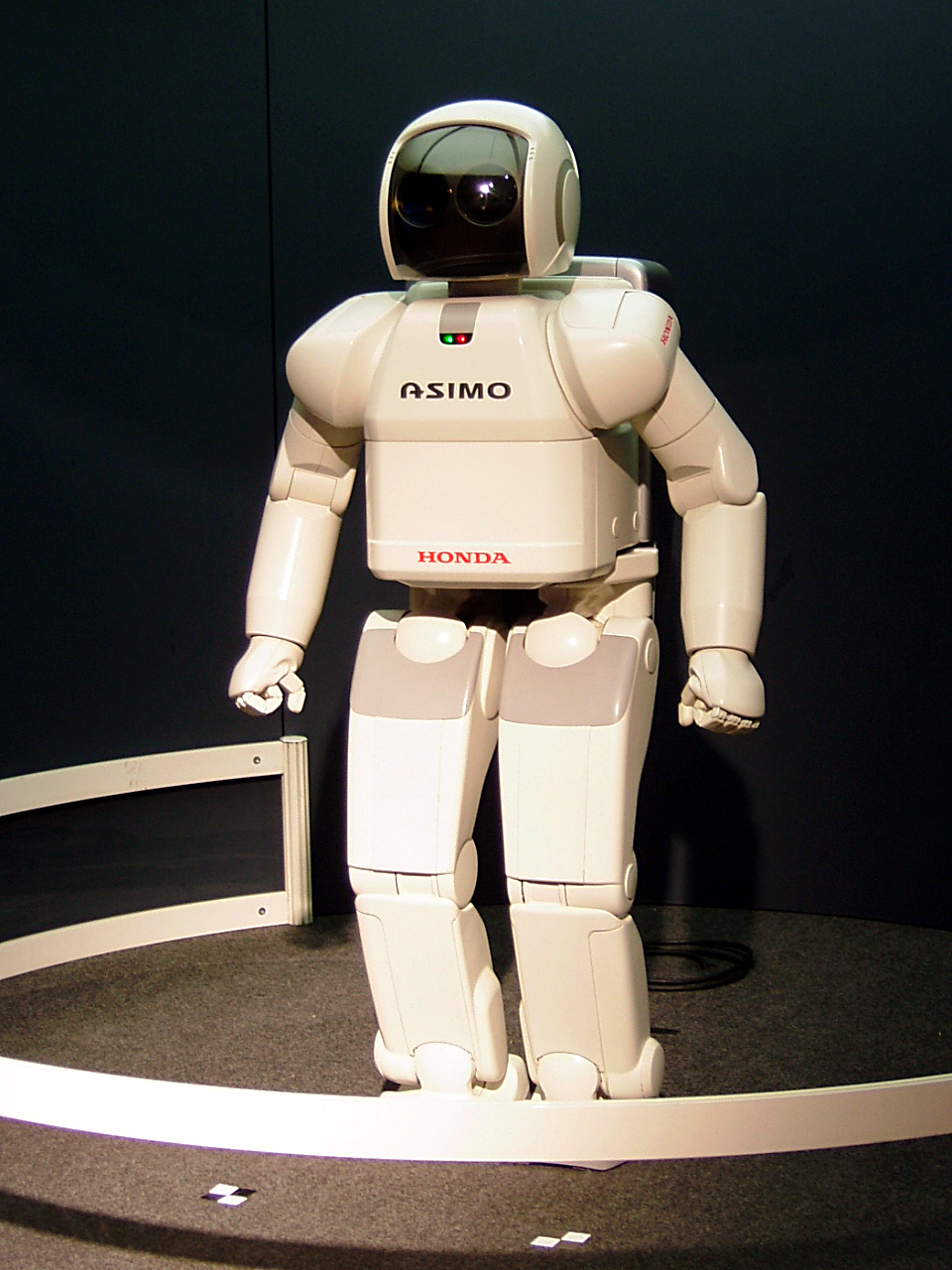
The Honda ASIMO, an example of the Japanese robotics technology that inspired the human-like design of the robot in the film

This was the first feature film for both Ford and Schreier, who were friends and classmates at the New York University Tisch School of the Arts. After graduation, Schreier directed music videos and commercials for companies like Absolut Vodka and Verizon. Around 2008, the two began discussing a feature-length project to collaborate on and chose the screenplay that had been Ford's senior thesis at Tisch, which Schreier had helped produce. This evolved into the screenplay for Robot & Frank.

Ford had originally begun conceptualizing the story for the film in 2002. He and Schreier were interested in the rapid development of technology and its impact on the daily life of ordinary people. Unlike more dystopian portrayals of the rise of technology in modern cinema, the filmmakers wanted Robot & Frank to explore the subject without any particular moral undercurrent. According to Schreier, technology is "not bad or good but it will change the way we relate to each other. There’s no stopping it."

The futuristic smartphones and tablets featured in the film were designed by Justin Ouellette of Tumblr, and the robot was created by Alterian, Inc., a Los Angeles-based effects company notable for their costume design for Daft Punk. The filmmakers wanted to emulate the style of caretaker robots made in Japan, and the design also needed to allow a human actor inside the robot suit, played by Rachael Ma.

=== Filming ===
The film was shot in 20 days on a budget of 2.5 million dollars. Filming took place in the summer in upstate New York. The library is the Rye Free Reading Room in Rye, New York.

According to Schreier, the heat caused the person inside of the robot suit, dancer Rachael Ma, so much discomfort that she had to be replaced with another actress, Dana Morgan, for two days of filming. Though Ma was initially tasked with providing Langella with the robot's lines, it became impossible for her to perform both the physical acting and lines simultaneously, and the task was given to Langella's nephew, who was a production assistant on the set.

== Reception ==
=== Critical response ===
The film received mostly positive reviews from critics. Rotten Tomatoes gives the film a score of 87% based on reviews from 137 critics. The site's consensus is "Led by a brilliant performance from star Frank Langella, Robot & Frank works as both a quirky indie drama and as a smart, thoughtful meditation on aging." On Metacritic it has a score of 67% based on reviews from 33 critics, indicating "generally favorable reviews".

The science fiction film also received positive reviews due to the film's portrayal of care robots and the uncovering of taboo topics related to care. Journal-writer Aino-Kaisa Koistinen appraises the film through "The (Care) Robot in Science Fiction: A Monster or a Tool for the Future?" and discusses how its plot and bond between the characters and robots was "...making visible the powerlessness of these old men in terms of deciding for their own care" (Koistinen, 2001, p. 104).

Kenneth Turan of the Los Angeles Times called it "charming, playful, and sly" and praised the first-time filmmakers' technical polish and choice to focus on classic themes of aging and human frailty. Turan subsequently named Robot & Frank one of 2012's best films. Peter Travers of Rolling Stone praised the "deceptive simplicity" of the film and singled out Langella's performance as "a master class in acting." Noel Murray of The A.V. Club, while critical of what he saw as a film "more concerned with telling a story and moving an audience than challenging anyone," recommended it overall as "sturdily crafted" and well-acted.

=== Awards ===
The film won the Alfred P. Sloan Prize at the 2012 Sundance Film Festival, tying with the Kashmiri film Valley of Saints.

== See also ==
- Android Kunjappan Version 5.25
- Koogle Kuttappa
- Disability robot
- Domestic robot
- Healthcare robot
- Robotics

Awards
Preceded by Another Earth	Alfred P. Sloan Prize Winner; 2012	Succeeded by Computer Chess
