= Friends (Francis and the Lights song) =

Single by Francis and the Lights featuring Bon Iver and Kanye West

from the album Farewell, Starlite!
- Released: July 7, 2016
- Length: 3:09
- Label: KTTF Music
- Songwriters: Aaron Lammer; Francis Farewell Starlite; BJ Burton; Rostam Batmanglij; Justin Vernon
- Producers: BJ Burton; Francis Farewell Starlite; Justin Vernon; Rostam Batmanglij; Aaron Lammer; Ariel Rechtshaid; Benny Blanco; Cashmere Cat; Kanye West

Francis and the Lights singles chronology
"Wonderful Everyday: Arthur" (2014)	"Friends" (2016)	"Summer Friends" (2016)

Bon Iver singles chronology
"Beth/Rest" (2012)	"Friends" (2016)	"22 (OVER S∞∞N)" / "10 d E A T h b R E a s T ⚄ ⚄" (2016)

Kanye West singles chronology
"Champions" (2016)	"Friends" (2016)	"Fade" (2016)

"Friends" is a song by American music project Francis and the Lights featuring Bon Iver and uncredited contributions from Kanye West. The song was released as a single on July 7, 2016, accompanied by a music video featuring Francis Farewell Starlite, Justin Vernon of Bon Iver and Kanye West.

The song was sampled in Chance the Rapper's song "Summer Friends" from his 2016 mixtape Coloring Book. "Friends" was sampled in "Summer Friends" before it was officially released independently as a single by Francis and the Lights.

Red Bull named it as the 15th best song of 2016.

Francis and the Lights, Vernon and West collaborated again in 2019 on the song "Take Me to the Light."

== Music video ==
A music video for "Friends" was released on July 7, 2016. The video was directed by Jake Schreier. Knowing each other since childhood, Francis and Schreier have been making single-take, minimalist performance videos since 2008. They wanted to do the next iteration of what they had been doing before. In a 2016 interview, Schreier said, "We had never done a synchronized dance in a video or really had other protagonists in the video, so that's what we wanted to add to this one."

Pitchfork named it as the 18th best music video of 2016. NPR named it as one of the best music videos of 2016.

== Track listing ==
No.	Title	Length
1.	"Friends"	3:09

== Charts ==
Chart	Peak position
UK Singles Downloads (Official Charts)	90
US Spotify Velocity (Billboard)	13
US Spotify Viral 50 (Billboard)	1
