= Just for Us =

Studio album by Francis and the Lights
- Released: December 29, 2017
- Genre: Synth-pop
- Length: 26:09
- Label: KTTF Music
- Producer: Francis Farewell Starlite

Francis and the Lights chronology
Farewell, Starlite! (2016)	Just for Us (2017)

Professional ratings
Review scores
Source	Rating
Pitchfork	6.6/10
Sputnikmusic	2.5/5 stars

Just for Us is the second studio album by American band Francis and the Lights. It was released in December 2017 under KTTF Records.

== Track listing ==
No.	Title	Length
1.	"Morning (Kardashian Theme Song)"	1:37
2.	"Just For Us"	2:58
3.	"Faithful"	2:22
4.	"Back In Time"	2:28
5.	"Tear It Up"	2:46
6.	"Scream So Loud"	2:04
7.	"I Won't Lie To You"	1:50
8.	"Breaking Up"	3:21
9.	"Never Back"	3:06
10.	"Cruise"	3:37
Total length:		26:09
