= Muxtape =

Music promotion website

Muxtape, LLC
- Company type: Private
- Website type: Music, Statistics & Community, Social network
- Available in: English
- Headquarters: Brooklyn, New York
- Key people: Justin Ouellette, Founder; Luke Crawford, CTO
- Employees: 2
- Website: muxtape.com
- Advertising: None
- Launched: March 25, 2008 (relaunched January 27, 2009)

Muxtape was a website that allowed bands to promote their music and users to discover artists. Muxtape allowed bands to upload music they owned for free streaming to fans, on the bands' profile and as an embeddable player, as well as configure profiles with images, videos, and a show calendar.

== First Iteration ==
Muxtape was created by Justin Ouellette in March 2008. Initial funding for the site was reported to be $95,000 and was provided by Jakob Lodwick, Justin's ex-Boss from Vimeo, and funding was agreed to via a contract written on a napkin. However, Justin Ouellette has since stated that the $95,000 amount concerned funding for more than just Muxtape alone.

The original version of Muxtape allowed music fans themselves to upload playlists of MP3s, based on the idea of a mixtape. This version was launched on March 25, 2008. Ouellette came up with the idea after being a disc jockey at his university's radio station. The site became unexpectedly popular immediately after launching, with 8,685 users registered in its first day and 97,748 in its first month. The site was supported by affiliate links to Amazon.com. A hallmark of the site was its very simple design. In-site searching of streamable tracks was a feature purposely absent (this feature likely contributed to the litigation brought against the Muxtape-inspired site Favtape). Ouellette explains that the important part of a mixtape, which he tried to preserve on his site, is about discovering new music instead of someone finding music they are already familiar with.

Muxtape was one in a long line of websites which permit users to create online playlists, either from user-uploaded tracks or selected from a library curated by the site. Past legal issues involving music sharing sites and programs led many observers to predict that Muxtape would eventually run into legal troubles with the music industry. However, Ouellette stated that Muxtape is different from the likes of Napster: "Its intended purpose is to introduce you to new music that you would then hopefully go and buy." He reported that he has spoken with many record labels who are excited about Muxtape's ability to bring new music to consumers. Some individuals predicted that if Muxtape were to gain significant momentum it would be unlikely to be shut down by legal pressure; it was more likely to have changes forced upon it as it became a legal licensor of the music on the site.

On August 18, 2008, Muxtape services ceased to be available, and the main page displayed the following message: "Muxtape will be unavailable for a brief period while we sort out a problem with the RIAA."

== Second iteration ==
On September 25, 2008, the Muxtape homepage began displaying a long message from the creator stating that the site's format was changing to a platform for independent artists to distribute their music. The site reappeared in preview mode on January 27, 2009; a blurb on the front page stated that "We’ve invited 12 of our favorite artists to help test, and in the coming weeks we'll begin allowing bands to sign up themselves for free." On April 21, additional bands were added and allowed to invite other bands to sign up for the service. The website continued to grow through trusted band to band invites. Ouellette originally created the site using PHP but after hiring Luke Crawford as Chief technical officer, Crawford rewrote the site and it is now powered by Ruby on Rails. The site uses Amazon AWS for storage and uses SoundManager 2 to play audio files.

As of May 2010, the Muxtape site is inactive, evidently while its creator re-envisions the site using HTML5 technologies.
