= Farewell, Starlite! =

2016 studio album by Francis and the Lights

Studio album by Francis and the Lights
- Released: September 24, 2016
- Genres: Electronic; alternative R&B; synth-pop
- Length: 32:49
- Label: KTTF Music
- Producers: Francis and the Lights (also exec.); BJ Burton; Benny Blanco; Cashmere Cat; Justin Vernon; Aaron Lammer; Kanye West; Rostam Batmanglij; Ariel Rechtshaid; Nate Fox; Jerome Hadey

Francis and the Lights chronology
Like a Dream (2013)	Farewell, Starlite! (2016)	Just for Us (2017)

Singles from Farewell, Starlite!
- 1. "Friends" Released: July 7, 2016; 2. "See Her Out (That's Just Life)" Released: September 9, 2016; 3. "May I Have This Dance (remix)" Released: May 18, 2017

Farewell, Starlite! is the debut studio album by American music project Francis and the Lights, self-released on September 24, 2016, as a free stream. It is a follow-up to the 2013 EP, Like a Dream. Music videos were created for "See Her Out", "Friends", and "May I Have This Dance (remix featuring Chance the Rapper)". The album features appearances from Bon Iver and Kanye West, as well as production by BJ Burton, Benny Blanco, Cashmere Cat, Justin Vernon, Aaron Lammer, Rostam Batmanglij, Ariel Rechtshaid, Nate Fox, and Jerome Hadey.

== Critical reception ==
Professional ratings
Review scores
Source	Rating
Consequence of Sound	C
The Guardian	4/5 stars
The Irish Times	3/5 stars
Pitchfork	6.4/10

Ben Beaumont-Thomas of The Guardian gave the album 4 stars out of 5 and called it "fleet-footed modern pop with just the right amount of whimsy." Cameron Cook of Pitchfork gave the album a 6.4 out of 10, writing, "While Farewell, Starlite! has its share of engaging moments, it's a shame that under all its technical flairs, its overall mood isn't gripping enough to do justice to its creator's vision."

The Fader named it one of the "24 Albums That Made Albums Matter Again in 2016". The A.V. Club named it one of the albums of the year.

== Track listing ==
Track list adapted from the Francis and the Lights website.

No.	Title	Writer(s)	Length
1.	"See Her Out (That's Just Life)"	Francis Farewell Starlite; Justin Vernon; BJ Burton; Aaron Lammer; Benjamin Levin; Magnus August Hoiberg; Rostam Batmanglij; Ariel Rechtshaid; Daniel Aged; Eli Kanat	3:31
2.	"Comeback"	Starlite; Vernon; Burton; Lammer; Levin; Hoiberg; Batmanglij	3:56
3.	"Cant Stay Party"	Starlite	3:05
4.	"I Want You to Shake"	Starlite; Burton; Levin; Rechtshaid; Nathaniel Fox; Nico Segal	3:14
5.	"May I Have This Dance"	Starlite; Burton; Lammer; Levin; Hoiberg; Grace Weber	2:53
6.	"My Citys Gone" (featuring Kanye West)	Starlite; Kanye West	3:54
7.	"Running Man / Gospel 0P1"	Starlite	3:20
8.	"It's Alright to Cry"	Starlite	4:08
9.	"Friends" (featuring Bon Iver)	Starlite; Vernon; Burton; Lammer; Batmanglij	3:08
10.	"Thank You"	Starlite; Vernon	1:38
Total length:			32:49
