= J. P. Bowersock =

American musician

J. P. Bowersock is an American musician, guitarist, performer, and record producer based in New York City. He has worked with many musicians, including The Strokes, Ryan Adams, RZA, Julian Casablancas and Zerobridge.
