= Yikes (Kanye West song) =

Single by Kanye West

from the album Ye
- Released: June 8, 2018
- Recorded: 2018
- Studio: West Lake Ranch, Jackson Hole, Wyoming
- Genre: Hip hop; trap
- Length: 3:08
- Label: GOOD; Def Jam
- Songwriters: Kanye West; Asten Harris; Aubrey Graham; Ayub Ogada; Cydel Young; Danielle Balbuena; Dexter Mills; James Mbarack Achieng; Jordan Jenks; Jordan Thorpe; Kenneth Pershon; Malik Jones; Mike Dean; Terrence Boykin
- Producer: Kanye West

Kanye West singles chronology
"Watch" (2018)	"Yikes" (2018)	"All Mine" (2018)

Ye track listing
- 7 tracks: 1. "I Thought About Killing You"; 2. "Yikes"; 3. "All Mine"; 4. "Wouldn't Leave"; 5. "No Mistakes"; 6. "Ghost Town"; 7. "Violent Crimes"

"Yikes" is a song by American rapper Kanye West from his eighth studio album, Ye (2018). The song includes echoing voices and a chilling bass in its composition, and was produced by West, while co-produced by Mike Dean, with additional production from Pi'erre Bourne and Apex Martin. The song was written by its producers along with eight additional songwriters, which included Aubrey Graham, known professionally as Drake, and as it samples "Kothbiro" by Black Savage, songwriting credits were added for James Mbarack Achieng and Ayub Ogada.

"Yikes" was serviced to UK mainstream radio and US radio stations as the lead single from Ye on June 8 and June 11, 2018, respectively, with both releases being through GOOD Music and Def Jam. Despite debuting the album without a single, West decided on the song being released as the lead single in the United States due to him having to choose one for promotion. An aggressive track that resembles "Wolves" by West, the song contains samples of "Kothbiro", performed by Black Savage. The lyrics of the song include West rapping about tweaking on drugs and publicity in light of his 2016 breakdown that forced him to cut his Saint Pablo Tour short, and the outro sees West deliver spoken word in reference to his bipolar disorder.

Since being released, "Yikes" has received generally positive reviews from music critics. The majority of them commended its production, with some critics drawing comparisons between the song and West's previous works, while others praised the honesty of the lyrical content. The song attained a peak position of number eight on the US Billboard Hot 100, marking the first time that West had reached the top 10 of the chart with a solo track since 2008, while it also obtained top 10 positions on the Canadian Hot 100 and the UK Singles Chart. The song charted in numerous other countries in 2018, and was certified platinum in the US by the Recording Industry Association of America (RIAA).

== Background and recording ==
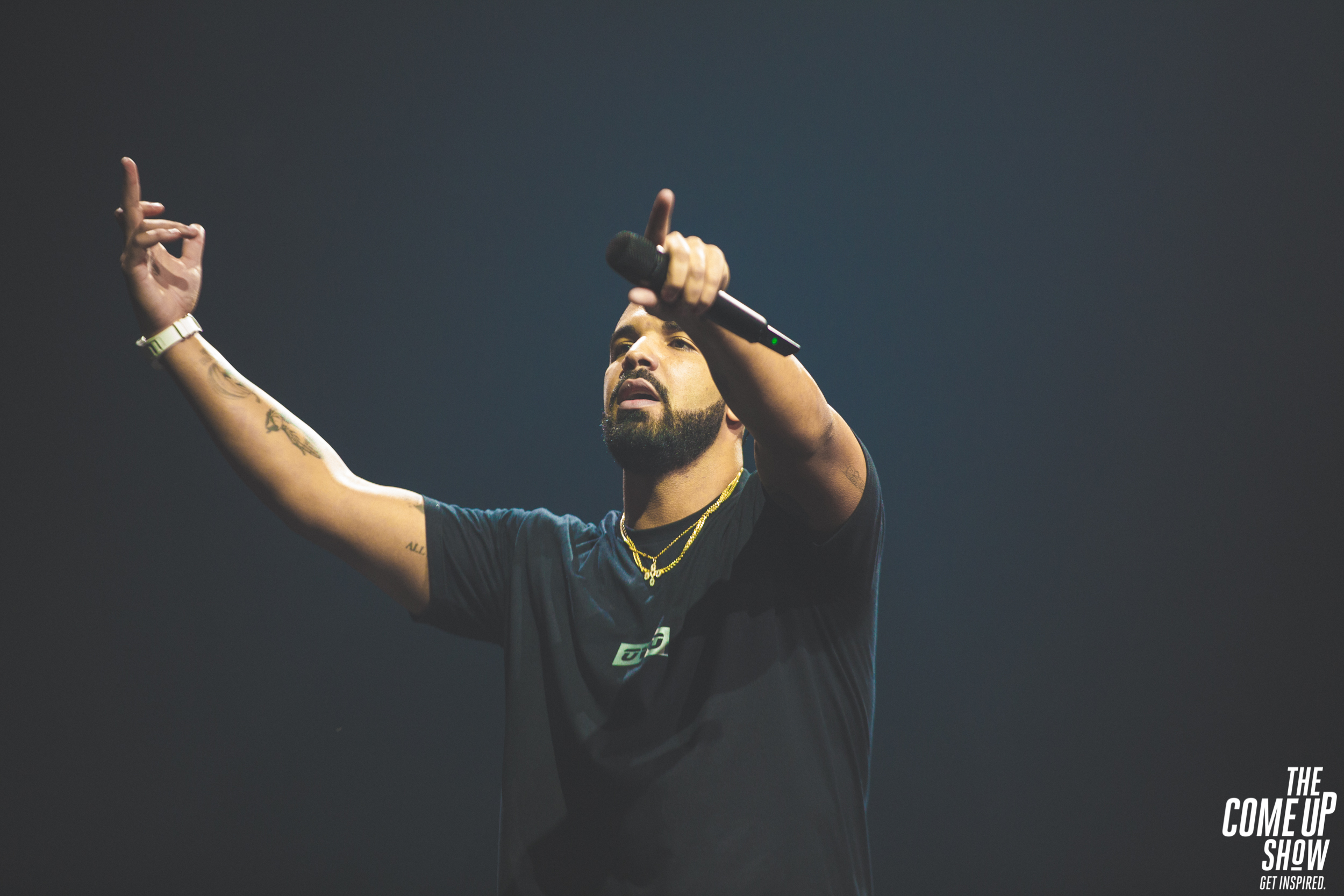
Drake had worked with West in the past and contributed to the writing of the track.

Canadian musician Drake had first worked with West for the latter's fifth studio album My Beautiful Dark Twisted Fantasy in 2010. Drake later helped write the tracks "Father Stretch My Hands, Pt. 1" and "30 Hours" for West's seventh studio album The Life of Pablo (2016), and he flew to Wyoming while West was recording for Ye. Radio host Peter Rosenberg originally reported Drake to have contributed songwriting to "Yikes", which was initially uncredited due to GOOD Music leaving Drake's credit off the album, and his contribution was revealed as writing the chorus. American producer Pi'erre Bourne also claimed that he worked on the track, apparently having been involved with the production, but the credits hadn't been updated to show his contributions days after release. The digital credits for the track were ultimately updated on June 13, 2018, to reveal a total of 11 credited writers, with the inclusion of Drake's name on the songwriting credits under his real name of Aubrey Graham, as the latter "fields questions" regarding the controversy between him and West's signee Pusha T over Drake's usage of ghostwriters. Simultaneously, Pi'erre Bourne and Apex Martin were newly credited as producers. West produced the track, with co-production from Mike Dean, and additional production from Pi'erre Bourne and Martin. Kenyan musicians Ayub Ogada and James Mbarack Achieng received writing credits due to having written "Kothbiro" (1976) by afro rock group Black Savage, the work that "Yikes" samples. The latter was also written by West, Dean, Graham, Cydel Young, Dexter Mills, Danielle Balbuena, Jordan Jenks, Asten Harris, Malik Yusef, Kenneth Pershon, Terrence Boykin, and Jordan Thorpe. During an interview with The New York Times on June 25, 2018, West revealed that Drake wrote a first verse for the track that did not make the final cut.

When questioned about receiving credit on the track due to having helped write the work sampled within it during a June 2018 phone call with The Nation, Ayub Ogada claimed that after having "done so many projects" he "cannot remember everything". Ogada elaborated, stating he "cannot remember at what moment in time I did that job" and that people use his "music to do their own projects". However, Ayub Ogada revealed that he had not been in contact with Achieng for "nearly 10 years", indicating that the two did not actively participate in the composing of the track. In response to the sampling within the track, Now-Again Records founder Eothen "Egon" Alapatt, who has knowledge that West sampled music from the label, said: "Kanye's going in there and sampling Black Savage. Who's doing that? Not many people are digging deep to find the dope moments on the Black Savage record." He also claimed that after first hearing "Kothbiro" in 2006, he "tried to track down and broker" due to thinking that "it would be an incredible sample source". However, it was 12 years later that West recorded "Yikes" during the recording sessions for Ye.

== Composition and lyrics ==
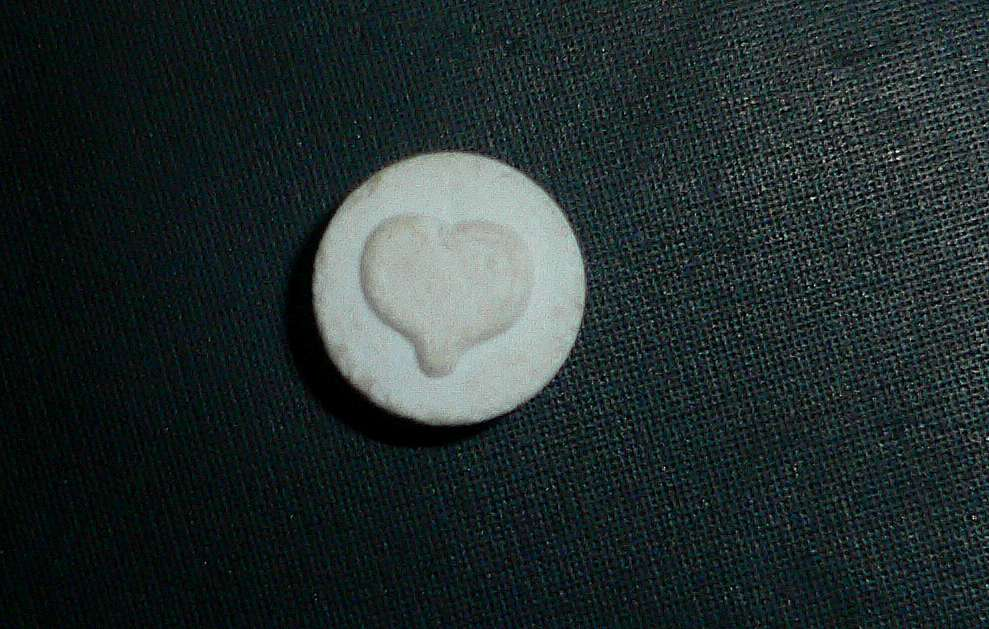
West raps about his experiences of tweaking on psychedelic drugs in the song's lyrics, such as 2C-B (pictured).

"Yikes" is an aggressive track that has a resemblance to West's The Life of Pablo track "Wolves" (2016). The song's production has been described as being "sparse, horror film-esque" and was viewed as "evoking" the track. On the other hand, the former has also been noted for its "tropical-style, meandering beat, and veering between moods". The song contains samples of the vocals parts and melodies from "Kothbiro", written by Ayub Ogada and Achieng, and performed by Black Savage. Within the song, West raps in a flow that was compared to fellow rapper Juvenile over echoing voices and a chilling bass, with the former being an ad-lib. Writing for The A.V. Club, Clayton Purdom claimed in reference to West rapping over the instrumental that "he goes into squealing, self-satisfied mania over the bleating MDMA pulse". The instrumentation of the song features a "humid bloom of the bass", as well as "drunken drums and MPC hiccups stagger upwind through that distorted drone". The song's opening has been compared to that of pop music and the chorus was pointed to as reminiscent of a stanza that "you could imagine hearing in a Linkin Park song". After the chorus, the instrumentation is chopped-up.

The lyrics feature West rapping about tweaking on drugs, with him having had apparent experiences with the psychedelic drugs 2C-B and DMT, and West embraces his prescriptions. Multiple references to #MeToo are made by West within "Yikes" and the chorus sees West rap about scaring himself. For one of the references, he claims to pray for Russell Simmons because the mogul "got #MeToo'd". West uses certain lyrics to shout-out Wiz Khalifa, Prince, Michael Jackson and Mahatma Gandhi. The outro consists of West delivering spoken word that paints his bipolar disorder as being a strength, which is in connection to West's mental health. Specifically, West proclaims that his mental illness is a "superpower".

== Release and promotion ==
"Yikes" replaced "XTCY", that was originally slated to be released under the title of "Extacy", as the second track on West's eighth studio album Ye, released on June 1, 2018. Although most people had already heard the album at the time of release, a lead single still had to be chosen from it for promotion. Henceforth, "Yikes" was sent to UK mainstream radio stations by West's labels GOOD Music and Def Jam as the lead single on June 8, 2018. On June 11 of the same month, West made the decision to release the song as the first single from Ye in the United States, as he thought it was the most appropriate track for radio. That same day, it was serviced to US radio stations through the aforementioned labels and such a release had been rumoured beforehand. The song was the focus of promotion for radio stations and streaming services, including Spotify and Apple Music; it was included on the former's Rap Caviar, among various other playlists.

It was suggested by HotNewHipHop that the track would be the first from the album to have an accompanying music video, if West did choose to release any. Though lyric videos were released for "Violent Crimes" and "All Mine" in July 2018, West hadn't put out music videos for any of the Ye tracks. Despite "Yikes" proving to not be a chart success, the song experienced continuous popularity on streaming services.

== Critical reception ==
The song has been met with general acclaim from music critics, with praise mostly going towards the production. Gaillot viewed the song's production and its resemblance to "Wolves" as an example on Ye of where West "relies on the musical flairs that once brought his fans awe". Christopher Hooton of The Independent affirmed the opening was one he hadn't heard from West since his fourth studio album 808s and Heartbreak in 2008 and he called the instrumental "a chopped-up beat that reminds" him of West's single "Famous" (2016). Hooton continued, claiming that West referencing #MeToo "perhaps isn't surprising" due to him having expressed strong honesty about "verbally abusive past relationships in previous songs, along with his promiscuity", and he compared the song to The Life of Pablo track "FML" (2016). The song was ranked by Eric Renner Brown from Billboard as the eighth best track from the five albums that West produced in 2018, (Note: Pusha T's Daytona, Ye, Kids See Ghosts' Kids See Ghosts, Nas' Nasir, and Teyana Taylor's K.T.S.E.) with him describing it as a "bleak, spiritual successor" to "FML", while directing praise towards West's personal style of lyricism and pointing out the "instrumental that conjures early Crystal Castles" as the strongest point of the song. Rodney Carmichael and Ann Powers from NPR viewed the Black Savage sample as reminding them of West's sixth studio album Yeezus (2013), calling it a "perfect sonic companion to drug-induced paranoia" and noting West employing the "obscure pop sampling of his earlier works". Lucy Jones of The Daily Telegraph praised its chorus for being similar to the music of Linkin Park, both melodically and emotionally.

Reviewing Ye for Vice, Robert Christgau named "Yikes" as one of the best tracks and said that it featured the "assiest moment", when West: "claims #MeToo for his foggy fat self, and if it's also the catchiest, fuck you if you can't take a joke - her too." The song was also listed among the album's best tracks by Wren Graves of Consequence of Sound, who praised West referencing his bipolar disorder as personal content related to his mental health. Referencing the song, Tom Breihan from Stereogum wrote that the bass, drums and the MPC stand among the "moments of true, transporting beauty on Ye". In comparison to West's April 2018 singles "Lift Yourself" and "Ye vs. the People", Rolling Stone's Rob Sheffield described the song as West having "even drearier complaints on deck". Maura Johnston of Time expressed mixed feelings, claiming that West's rapping "doesn't deviate too much from the lyrical concepts of Pablo-it blends the trivial and the life-or-death", though viewed the song as a "darkened-club" track. Meaghan Garvey was somewhat negative in Pitchfork, writing of West's rapping that "he scoffs in an anesthetized Juvenile flow", while labeling "Yikes" as aptly-named. Garvey also criticized the lyrical content, describing it as what "offers no further insight into West's beliefs because there is not much more to say" and deemed one of West's #MeToo references as being cringey.

== Commercial performance ==
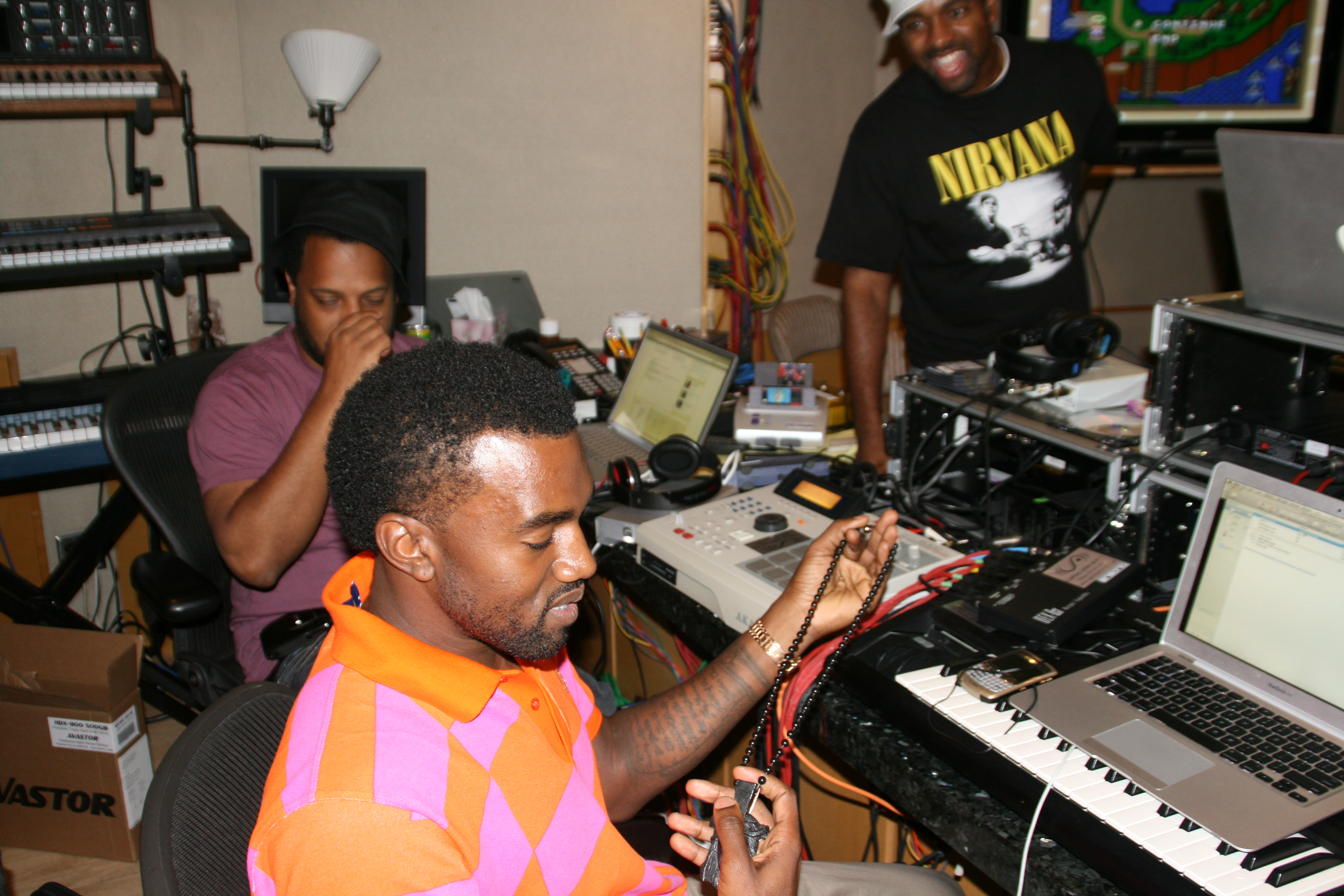
"Yikes" was West's first top 10 song in both the UK and US as a solo artist since the single "Heartless" in 2008.

The song debuted at number eight on the US Billboard Hot 100 following the release of Ye, prior to being released as a single. By doing so, it stood as the highest-charting track from the album and the only one to reach the top 10 of the Hot 100. This entry marked West's first track to debut in the top 10 of the chart since the single "Forever" that also includes Drake, Lil Wayne and Eminem entered at number eight in 2009. It also stood as West's first track to reach the top 10 of the Hot 100 since the joint single "FourFiveSeconds" with Rihanna and Paul McCartney attained a peak position of number four in 2015, and his first solo track to make its entry in the top 10 since the single "Heartless" debuted at number four in 2008. By achieving his 16th Hot 100 top 10, West became tied with Nicki Minaj for the 6th-most top 10 hits among rappers. "Yikes" entered the US Streaming Songs chart at number three with 34.2 million streams, two places behind "All Mine" with 36.3 million streams, though the song gave West his second highest debut on the chart. However, it had a higher debut on the Hot 100 than the track due to receiving more radio airplay and logging 13,000 first-week sales, in comparison to the 6,000 logged by "All Mine", which charted at number 11. The song debuted at number seven on the US Hot R&B/Hip-Hop Songs chart and gave West his 25th top 10 entry, with "Yikes" and "All Mine" simultaneously becoming West's first tracks to reach the top 10 of the chart since "All Day" in 2015. Following the release of West and Kid Cudi's eponymous debut studio album as the hip hop duo Kids See Ghosts, the song descended 32 places to number 40 in its second week on the Hot 100, 1 place below the album's highest charting track "Reborn" on the chart. The former spent five weeks on the chart in total. On August 14, 2019, "Yikes" was certified platinum by the Recording Industry Association of America (RIAA) for sales of 1,000,000 certified units in the US.

The track performed best in Canada, charting at number six on the Canadian Hot 100. After being released as a single, the track made its debut at number 10 on the UK Singles Chart, standing as the highest new entry for the chart issue that coincided with West's 41st birthday. With its debut, the track gave West his 18th top 10 single on the chart and his first since "FourFiveSeconds" reached number three in 2015, as well as West's first top 10 as a solo artist since "Heartless" reached the position of number 10 in 2008. However, the track failed to reach the top ten in New Zealand, entering at number 11 on the NZ Singles Chart. It debuted at number 13 on the Slovakia Singles Digitál Top 100. The track peaked at number 16 on the Irish Singles Chart, while attaining a similar position of number 17 on the Greece International Digital Singles chart. On the ARIA Singles Chart, the track entered at number 18, giving West his second top 20 entry in the week of Ye's release. The track attained a peak position of number 30 on the Portuguese Singles Chart, while also entering the top 40 of the Danish Hitlisten, Swiss Hitparade, Czech Republic Singles Digitál Top 100, and Hungary Single Top 40 charts. "Yikes" experienced lesser performance in Austria, charting at number 44 on the Ö3 Austria Top 40.

== Credits and personnel ==
Recording

- Recorded at West Lake Ranch, Jackson Hole, Wyoming

Personnel

- Kanye West – production, songwriter
- Mike Dean – co-production, songwriter, engineering, mixing
- Apex Martin – additional production, songwriter
- Pi'erre Bourne – additional production, songwriter
- Aubrey Graham – songwriter
- Ayub Ogada – songwriter
- Cydel Young – songwriter
- Danielle Balbuena – songwriter
- Dexter Mills – songwriter
- James Mbarack Achieng – songwriter
- Jordan Thorpe – songwriter
- Kenneth Pershon – songwriter
- Malik Yusef – songwriter
- Terrence Boykin – songwriter
- Sean Solymar – assistant recording engineering
- Andrew Dawson – engineering, programming
- Mike Malchicoff – engineering
- Noah Goldstein – engineering
- Zack Djurich – engineering
- Jess Jackson – mixing

Credits adapted from Tidal.

== Charts ==
Chart performance for "Yikes"
Chart (2018)	Peak position
Australia (ARIA)	18
Austria (Ö3 Austria Top 40)	44
Canada Hot 100 (Billboard)	6
Czech Republic Singles Digital (ČNS IFPI)	33
Denmark (Tracklisten)	32
France (SNEP)	68
Germany (GfK)	84
Greece International Digital Singles (IFPI)	17
Hungary (Single Top 40)	34
Hungary (Stream Top 40)	21
Ireland (IRMA)	16
Netherlands (Single Top 100)	77
New Zealand (Recorded Music NZ)	11
Portugal (AFP)	30
Scottish Singles Sales (Official Charts)	83
Slovakia Singles Digital (ČNS IFPI)	13
Sweden (Sverigetopplistan)	73
Switzerland (Schweizer Hitparade)	32
UK Singles (Official Charts)	10
UK Hip Hop/R&B (Official Charts)	3
US Billboard Hot 100	8
US Hot R&B/Hip-Hop Songs (Billboard)	7
US Rhythmic Airplay (Billboard)	25

== Certifications ==
Certifications for "Yikes"
Region	Certification	Certified units/sales
New Zealand (RMNZ)	Gold	15,000^{‡}
United Kingdom (BPI)	Silver	200,000^{‡}
United States (RIAA)	Platinum	1,000,000^{‡}
^{‡} Sales+streaming figures based on certification alone.

== Release history ==
Release dates and formats for "Yikes"
Region	Date	Format	Label(s)	Ref.
United Kingdom	June 8, 2018	Mainstream radio	GOOD; Def Jam	
United States	June 11, 2018	Streaming	GOOD; Def Jam	

== See also ==
- 2018 in hip hop music
- List of UK top-ten singles in 2018
- List of Billboard Hot 100 top-ten singles in 2018
