= Ecstasy =

Ecstasy most often refers to:

- Ecstasy (emotion), a trance or trance-like state in which a person transcends normal consciousness
- Religious ecstasy, a state of consciousness, visions or absolute euphoria
- Ecstasy (philosophy), to be or stand outside oneself
- Ecstasy (drug), colloquial term for MDMA in tablet form, an empathogenic drug

Ecstasy may also refer to:

== Arts and entertainment ==
=== Literature ===
- Ecstasy: Three Tales of Chemical Romance, a 1996 collection of three novellas by Irvine Welsh
- Ecstasies (book), a 1989 book by Carlo Ginzburg
- Ecstasy (comics), a super villain in the Marvel Comics Universe
- "The Ecstasy", a poem by John Donne

=== Music ===
==== Bands ====
- XTC, an English band, pronounced as X-T-C

==== Albums ====
- Ecstasy (Sami Yusuf album), 2026
- Ecstasy (Avant album), 2002
- Ecstasy (Deuter album), 1979
- Ecstasy (Kissin' Dynamite album), 2018
- Ecstasy (Lou Reed album), 2000
- Ecstasy (My Bloody Valentine album), 1987
- Ecstasy (Ohio Players album), 1973
- Ecstasy (Steve Kuhn album), 1975

==== Songs ====
- "Ecstasy" (ATB song), on his 2004 album No Silence
- "Ecstasy" (Koda Kumi song), on her 2009 album 3 Splash
- "Ecstasy" (New Order song), on their 1983 album Power, Corruption & Lies
- "Ecstasy" (Raspberries song), on their 1973 album Side 3
- "Ecstasy" (Jody Watley song), from her 1993 album Intimacy
- "Ecstacy" (song), by Suicidal-Idol in 2022
- "Ecstasy", by Bone Thugs-n-Harmony on their 2000 album BTNHResurrection
- "Ecstasy", by Eric Burdon on his 1980 album Darkness Darkness
- "Ecstasy", by Crooked Still on their 2005 album Shaken by a Low Sound
- "Ecstasy", by Danity Kane on their 2008 album Welcome to the Dollhouse
- "Ecstasy", by D-Complex, released for the 2002 music video game Dance Dance Revolution Extreme
- "Ecstasy", by Iceage on their 2013 album You're Nothing
- "Ecstasy", by jj on their 2009 album jj n° 2
- "Ecstasy", by Megadeth on their 1999 album Risk
- "Ecstasy", by Dolores O'Riordan on her 2007 debut solo album Are You Listening?
- "Ecstasy", by Doc Pomus and Phil Spector, recorded by Ben E. King in 1962
- "Ecstasy", by The Stripes in 1979
- "Ecstasy", by Jaguar Wright on her 2005 album Divorcing Neo 2 Marry Soul
- "Ecstasy", by zZz, 2003
- "Ecstasy", by Young Thug on his 2019 album So Much Fun
- "Ecstasy (Apple of My Eye)", by Strawberry Switchblade

=== Other media ===
- Ecstasy (film), a 1933 Czech film starring Hedy Lamarr and directed by Gustav Machatý
- Ecstasy (play), a 1979 play by Mike Leigh
- Ecstasy (Gill sculpture), a 1911 relief sculpture by Eric Gill
- Irvine Welsh's Ecstasy, a 2011 film based on Irvine Welsh's third novella, The Undefeated

== Other uses ==
- Carnival Ecstasy, previously known as Ecstasy, a cruise ship operated by Carnival Cruise Lines
- Ecstasy (clothing), a fashion brand based in Bangladesh

== See also ==
- "Extacy" (Kanye West song)
- Extasy Records, a record label
- Ekkstacy, Canadian singer-songwriter
- Stacy X, a Marvel Comics character
- XTC (disambiguation)
- Ekstasis (disambiguation)
