= No Mistakes =

Song by Kanye West

from the album Ye
- Released: June 1, 2018
- Recorded: 2018
- Studio: West Lake Ranch, Jackson Hole, Wyoming
- Genre: Hip hop
- Length: 2:03
- Label: GOOD; Def Jam
- Songwriters: Kanye West; Che Pope; Cydel Young; Edwin Hawkins; Kenneth Pershon; Malik Jones; Mike Dean; Ricky Walters; Terrence Boykin
- Producer: Kanye West

Ye track listing
- 7 tracks: 1. "I Thought About Killing You"; 2. "Yikes"; 3. "All Mine"; 4. "Wouldn't Leave"; 5. "No Mistakes"; 6. "Ghost Town"; 7. "Violent Crimes"

"No Mistakes" is a song by American rapper Kanye West from his eighth studio album, Ye (2018). The song features vocals from Kid Cudi, Charlie Wilson and Caroline Shaw. It was produced by West, while co-produced by Che Pope and Shaw, with additional production from Mike Dean and Eric Danchick. The producers of the song, with the exception of Danchick, wrote it alongside Cyhi the Prynce, Malik Yusef, Kenneth Pershon and Bump J. Songwriting credit was added for Slick Rick due to the song sampling his work and as it samples music by the Edwin Hawkins Singers, Edwin Hawkins was credited as a songwriter. The song contains samples of "Children Get Together", performed by the Edwin Hawkins Singers, as well as "Hey Young World", performed by Slick Rick.

In the lyrics of the song, various self-righteous outbursts are delivered by West. "No Mistakes" received generally positive reviews from music critics, who often appreciated Wilson's vocals. Some praised the song's Slick Rick sample, while critical assessment of West's verse was less positive. It charted in the top 50 of the charts for Australia, Canada, Ireland, Slovakia, and the United States in 2018. The song has since been certified gold in the US by the Recording Industry Association of America (RIAA). In June 2018, Kanye shared a video of North West singing its chorus. A version of the song with different lyrics was performed by the Sunday Service Choir during rehearsal in January of the following year.

== Background ==
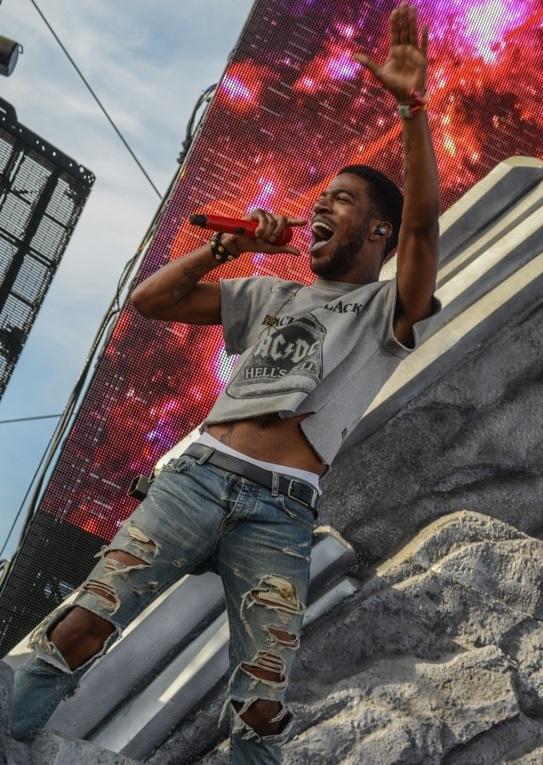
Kid Cudi contributed vocals to the song.

Kanye West and fellow rapper Kid Cudi first collaborated on the track "Welcome to Heartbreak", which features the latter and is from West's fourth studio album 808s & Heartbreak (2008). The two later experienced a troubled relationship at times, including Kid Cudi branding West as a "hater" in September 2016. In March 2018, he was spotted with West in Wyoming; Ye was recorded that year at West Lake Ranch in the state's valley Jackson Hole. Kid Cudi was one of the first attendees to arrive at the album's listening party in the valley on May 31, 2018, and contributed vocals to the track "Ghost Town" as well as "No Mistakes". American singer Charlie Wilson was previously featured on West's tracks "Good Friday" (2010) and "Bound 2" (2013), and the song includes vocals from him. In 2015, West released a remix of 808s & Heartbreak track "Say You Will" (2008), featuring American violinist and singer Caroline Shaw. The credits for Ye were updated on June 13, 2018, crediting Shaw for having contributed vocals and production to "No Mistakes". The song was produced by West and co-produced by Che Pope alongside Shaw, while additional production was handled by Mike Dean and Eric Danchick.

American rapper Slick Rick received songwriting credit because he wrote "Hey Young World" (1989), which the song samples. Due to having wrote "Children Get Together" (1971) by American gospel group the Edwin Hawkins Singers, the work that "No Mistakes" samples, the group's leader Edwin Hawkins was posthumously credited as a songwriter on the song. It was also written by West, Dean, Pope, Cyhi the Prynce, Malik Yusef, Kenneth Pershon, and Bump J. "Hey Young World" had previously been sampled by frequent West collaborator Jay-Z on the track "All Around the World", produced by No I.D., from his seventh studio album The Blueprint 2: The Gift & The Curse (2002).

== Composition and lyrics ==
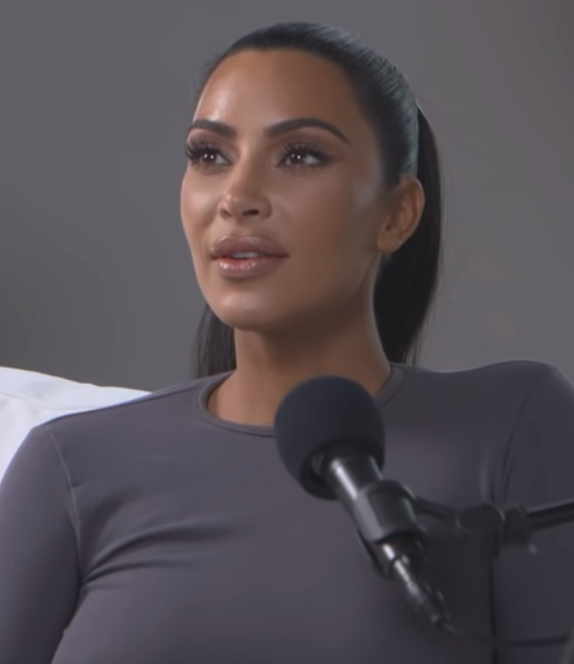
The main line of the song's chorus was described as showing West alluding to his ongoing love for Kim Kardashian.

"No Mistakes" features a sample from "Children Get Together", written by Hawkins and performed by the Edwin Hawkins Singers, which is used for the main piano portion that is played throughout. It also samples the "believe it or not" vocals from "Hey Young World", as written and performed by Slick Rick. At multiple points within the track, the vocals from the recording are looped. The recording is a hip hop sample, and the track was noted for including a tender tone.

Wilson and Kid Cudi perform the chorus of the track, featuring the two of them singing, "Make no mistake, girl, I still love you." The lyric is repeated throughout the chorus and has been interpreted as a reference to West's love for his wife Kim Kardashian despite the issues during their relationship at times. From his position as a multi-millionaire, West delivers a series of self-righteous outbursts within the track. Certain lyrics are used by West to reference the issues with money that he faced after hospitalisation in 2016.

== Release and promotion ==
On June 1, 2018, "No Mistakes" was released as the fifth track on West's eighth studio album Ye. Wilson shared a link to the song on his official website, alongside an image featuring lyrics from it. Kardashian shared a rehearsal video of West's gospel group the Sunday Service Choir to Instagram on January 13, 2019. The clip featured the group performing a reworked version of the song, with them using alternate lyrics for the chorus.

== Critical reception ==
The track was met with generally positive reviews from music critics, several of whom praised Wilson's vocals. Michelle Kim and Sheldon Pearce from Pitchfork pointed out the Slick Rick sample in praise, citing it as an example of when the album's "signature chops prove that Kanye remains among rap's most savvy samplers," and the lines "Truth told, I like you/Too bold to type you/Too rich to fight you/Calm down, you light skin!" were listed by Kim and Pearce as being among the notable "Kanye-isms" on Ye. "No Mistakes" was viewed alongside fellow album track "Yikes" by Andrew Barker of Variety as "West operating in vintage mode," with him directing praise towards the sample loops. In The Observer, Kitty Empire noted the track for featuring a "buttery first verse and chorus." One of the "moments of true, transporting beauty on Ye" was listed by Tom Breihan of Stereogum as being "Wilson's voice surging skyward on [the track], soaring above those pianos like a phoenix in flight." Writing for the Los Angeles Times, Mikael Wood called West and Wilson's singing "just astounding." Alexis Petridis of The Guardian praised West's lyricism and the track's "crashing drums," as well as its Slick Rick sample. Greg Kot from the Chicago Tribune noted "a hint of tenderness" in Wilson and Kid Cudi's "melodic refrain." Exclaim! writer Kyle Mullin commented that the track's "soaring backing vocals and strategically spliced" Slick Rick sample both "harken back to Yeezy's more soulful" era of his second studio album Late Registration (2005). AllMusic's Neil Z. Yeung stated that the song features "uplifting, old-school production," which he viewed as "recalling early-2000s Kanye."

A number of reviewers were more critical. Craig Jenkins, for Vulture, praised the song's composition, especially the "booming" chorus from Wilson, "spectral" bass and diced Slick Rick lines, but characterized it as an offbeat love song and slammed the message of West's verse. Billboard's Michael Saponara picked it as the second worst track on Ye, though praised Wilson's "soothing" chorus. Christopher Hooton of The Independent panned it as "barely even a song", characterizing its chorus as "lacklustre" and West's verse as "half-assed." In The Boston Globe, Julian Benbow branded the song "bafflingly underwhelming."

== Commercial performance ==
Following the release of Ye, "No Mistakes" debuted at number 36 on the US Billboard Hot 100. The song also entered the US Streaming Songs chart, peaking at number 17, with streams of 21.2 million. Simultaneously, it reached number 21 on the US Hot R&B/Hip-Hop Songs chart. On March 1, 2021, the song was certified gold by the Recording Industry Association of America (RIAA) for pushing 500,000 certified units in the United States.

"No Mistakes" has its best chart performance in Canada, peaking at number 27 on the Canadian Hot 100. On the Irish Singles Chart, the song reached number 38. It debuted at numbers 46 and 50 on the ARIA Singles Chart and Slovakia Singles Digitál Top 100, respectively. The song charted at number 65 on both the Greece International Digital Singles chart and Portuguese Singles Chart.

== Appearances in media ==
On the evening of June 3, 2018, Kanye tweeted out a video of his daughter North West singing the chorus of "No Mistakes". The clip features West holding a box of Yoo-hoo and wearing a night gown, and she looks directly into the camera while singing. Accompanying the video, Kanye West captioned it with a trio of heart-eyed emojis. The video gathered positive reactions from fans of West on Twitter, surpassing over a million views. Prior to sharing it, West had been joined by his family for the album's listening party in Wyoming. Users of Twitter believed that Drake was dissed in the song, which had been echoed in some reviews.

== Credits and personnel ==
Recording

- Recorded at West Lake Ranch, Jackson Hole, Wyoming

Personnel

- Kanye West – production, songwriter
- Che Pope – co-production, songwriter
- Caroline Shaw – co-production, vocals
- Mike Dean – additional production, songwriter, engineering, mixing
- Eric Danchick – additional production
- Cydel Young – songwriter
- Edwin Hawkins – songwriter
- Kenneth Pershon – songwriter
- Malik Yusef – songwriter
- Ricky Walters – songwriter
- Terrence Boykin – songwriter
- Mike Malchicoff – engineering
- Zack Djurich – engineering
- Sean Solymar – assistant recording engineering
- Jess Jackson – mixing
- Charlie Wilson – vocals
- Kid Cudi – vocals

Credits adapted from Tidal.

== Charts ==
Chart performance for "No Mistakes"
Chart (2018)	Peak position
Australia (ARIA)	46
Canada Hot 100 (Billboard)	27
France (SNEP)	195
Greece International Digital Singles (IFPI)	65
Ireland (IRMA)	38
Portugal (AFP)	65
Slovakia Singles Digital (ČNS IFPI)	50
UK Audio Streaming (Official Charts)	26
US Billboard Hot 100	36
US Hot R&B/Hip-Hop Songs (Billboard)	21

== Certifications ==
Certifications for "No Mistakes"
Region	Certification	Certified units/sales
United States (RIAA)	Gold	500,000^{‡}
^{‡} Sales+streaming figures based on certification alone.
