= Wouldn't Leave =

Song by Kanye West

from the album Ye
- Released: June 1, 2018
- Recorded: 2018
- Studio: West Lake Ranch, Jackson Hole, Wyoming
- Genre: Gospel
- Length: 3:25
- Label: GOOD; Def Jam
- Songwriters: Kanye West; Francis Starlite; Jahron Brathwaite; Jeremy Felton; Jordan Thorpe; Justin Vernon; Kenneth Pershon; Malik Jones; Mike Dean; Noah Goldstein; Reverend W.A. Donaldson; Terrence Boykin; Tyrone Griffin, Jr.
- Producer: Kanye West

Ye track listing
- 7 tracks: 1. "I Thought About Killing You"; 2. "Yikes"; 3. "All Mine"; 4. "Wouldn't Leave"; 5. "No Mistakes"; 6. "Ghost Town"; 7. "Violent Crimes"

"Wouldn't Leave" is a song by American rapper Kanye West from his eighth studio album, Ye (2018). The song includes vocals from PartyNextDoor, Ty Dolla Sign and Jeremih. It was produced by West and co-produced by Ty Dolla Sign, while additional production was handled by Mike Dean and Noah Goldstein. A minimalist track that includes gospel elements, the song contains a sample of "Baptizing Scene", performed by Reverend W.A. Donaldson. The former is a tribute to Kim Kardashian, including West addressing her reaction to his "slavery was a choice" statement. In May 2018, the song was revealed by West to be set for release on the album.

Ultimately released as the fourth track on Ye in June 2018, "Wouldn't Leave" received generally mixed reviews from music critics. The subject matter was mostly written negatively of by them, with the focus around it being commonly placed on West's performance. However, numerous critics complemented the production and a few praised the thought process behind the song. It reached number 24 on the US Billboard Hot 100 in 2018 and charted in numerous other countries, including Canada and New Zealand. The song was interpolated by August Alsina on his track of the same title in October 2018.

== Background and recording ==
"Wouldn't Leave" was produced by West, with co-production from American musician Ty Dolla Sign and additional production from Mike Dean, and Noah Goldstein. As well as Ty Dolla Sign, the song includes vocals from singers PartyNextDoor and Jeremih. Along with the song, the former of the three contributed vocals to Ye tracks "All Mine" and "Violent Crimes". On June 4, 2018, three days after the album's release, he teased a collaborative album with West. In a phone conversation with Rolling Stone on August 30 of that year, Ty Dolla Sign recalled "going off on the backgrounds, no Auto-Tune" when the two worked together.

On May 15, 2018, West shared a video of him in the studio that revealed a track list for Ye on a whiteboard, with West having recorded the album that year. The track list showed "Wouldn't Leave" set to be released on it as the third track. Justin Vernon of Bon Iver later tweeted that the song originated as a collaboration between him and American musician Phil Cook, stating Cook would have performed "piano and Jupiter synths," while he was supposed to be "on some op-1 gospel samples." West had sampled Reverend W.A. Donaldson's "Baptizing Scene" in the past on his collaborative single "Niggas in Paris" (2011), with fellow rapper Jay-Z. In a 2018 interview with TMZ, West made a controversial statement that "slavery was a choice." West was supposed to add more to his referencing of the statement within "Wouldn't Leave", though decided not to because it was "just too sensitive."

== Composition and lyrics ==
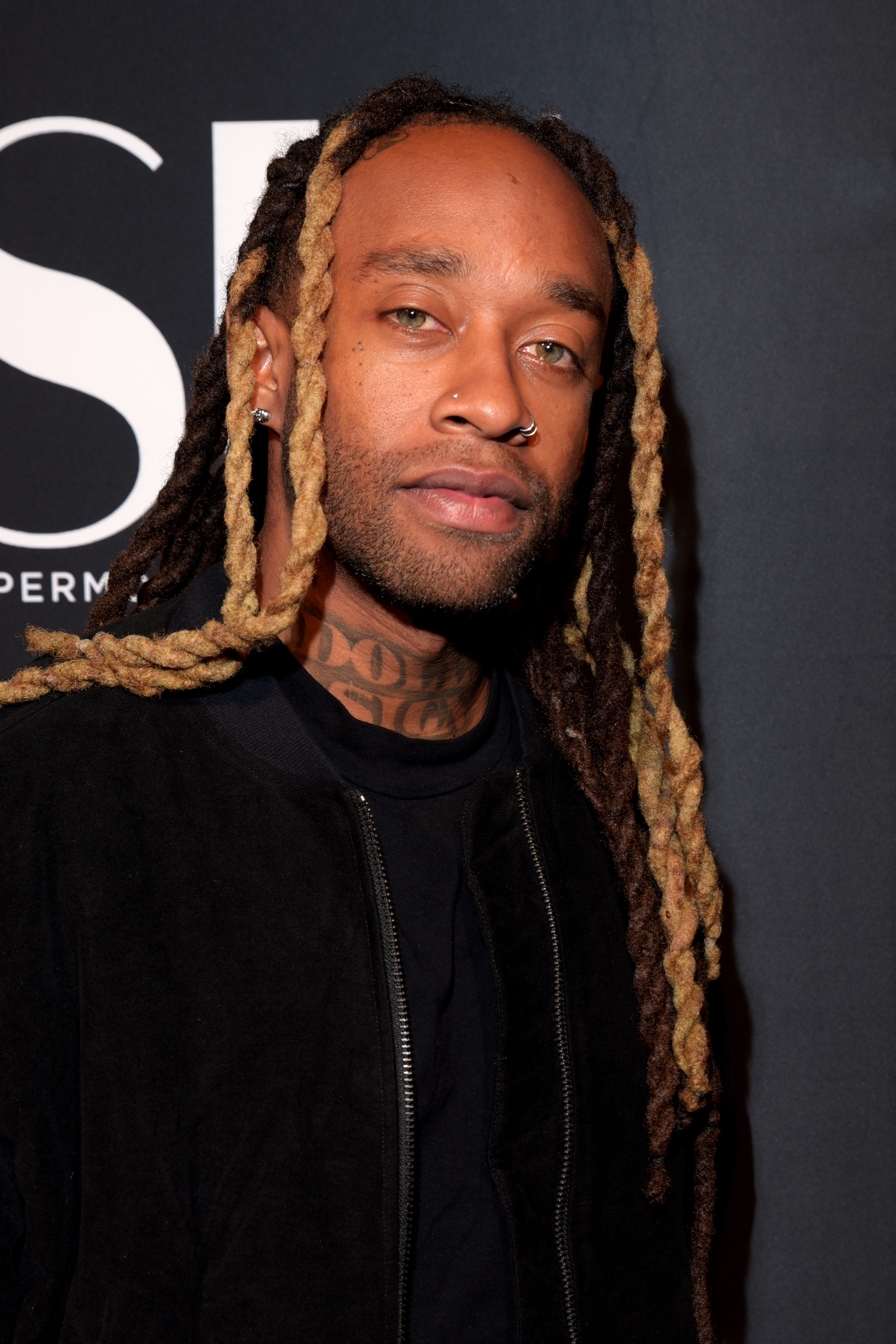
Ty Dolla Sign contributes vocals on both the final chorus and the outro.

"Musically", "Wouldn't Leave" is a gospel track that includes piano, and has been noted for having a minimalist sound. It features a sample of the recording "Baptizing Scene", as performed by Reverend W.A. Donaldson. "Wouldn't Leave" is a tribute to West's wife Kim Kardashian, who he appreciates for consistently standing by his side. The opening of the song features PartyNextDoor singing about his feelings of insecurity towards a woman. West's first verse begins after the intro and he mentions his statement about slavery, while also rapping about an aggressive encounter with Sway from 2013. The former being referenced by West continues, as he addresses how Kardashian reacted to it, though does not explain the statement itself. Despite not issuing an apology to her, West admits he can be a lot to handle and West presents himself as offering Kardashian to leave him but shows her as declining the offer. The chorus of the song is performed by PartyNextDoor.

Later within the song, West defends his behaviour, while citing his messaging style as being the problem. The public image that West presents is expressed by him as being different from the way he behaves in private, with West specifying that the two personas do not overlap. The final chorus features Ty Dolla Sign and a backing choir alongside PartyNextDoor. In the outro of the song, West thanks Kardashian for being loyal to their relationship and dedicates the outro to her as well as other women that possess similar loyalty. Ty Dolla Sign hums "keep that same energy" repeatedly during the outro.

== Release and promotion ==
On June 1, 2018, "Wouldn't Leave" was released as the fourth track on West's eighth studio album Ye, switching position from its originally slated release as the third track. At the 2018 CFDA Fashion Awards on June 4 of that year, Kardashian revealed that the song was the only one from the album that West didn't play for her properly until "the last minute." She confirmed that there was truth to West's claims of them having fought over his slavery statement, but admitted there are some things the couple do not "put on social media," though Kardashian said she's a fan of "Wouldn't Leave". Kardashian elaborated, saying that her and West, "have different views sometimes, but that's my husband, you know?" American rapper August Alsina released his single of the same title on October 2, 2018, which interpolates the song.

== Critical reception ==
The song was met with generally mixed reviews from music critics, who often panned the subject matter but praised the production. Spin's Jordan Sargent wrote that the song "feels like the moment when rays begins to peek through the storm clouds" on the album musically, though criticized it for being "a celebration of men abusing the love and compassion extended to them by their wives." Kyle Mullin from Exclaim! panned West's performance, calling his lyricism nauseating, though praised the song's "stubby, stick-in-your-eardrum beats and glistening vintage synths." The New York Times's Jon Pareles complained that West mentioning his slavery comments within the song is not done "as a historical argument, but as proof of his audacity," despite complementing the production. The staff of XXL highlighted the production for being "reminiscent of early Kanye" but panned the lyrical content due to the "lack of an explanation" of West's slavery comments from him. Writing for Entertainment Weekly, Alex Suskind praised West's songwriting, while describing the subject matter of the song as dour. Variety critic Andrew Barker called the song "ostensibly introspective" but he slammed the subject matter due to West being self-obsessed and noted that while West's referencing of his slavery comments "offers zero insight into his actual political views, it might provide a window into his thinking."

Some reviewers were less divided in their assessments of "Wouldn't Leave". In comparison to West's singles "Lift Yourself" and "Ye vs. the People" from April 2018, the song was described by Rob Sheffield of Rolling Stone as West having "even drearier complaints on deck." Jonah Bromwich from Pitchfork wrote in response to the song: "The music is an army of prayer hands, floating on a wave—please and thank you and praise you all at once—all for Kim." Bromwich explained the connection to Kardashian due to West rapping "she wouldn't leave" after having offered her "that exit." Kitty Empire of The Observer gave the song a negative review, branding it in connection to "Yikes" as being "another track with a superficially twinkly mien" on Ye. In The Independent, Christopher Hooton stated that the song "chronicles the strain Kanye's recent behaviour put on his marriage" and viewed it as paying tribute to "every damn female that stuck with they dude [when he's been an inconsiderate, unthinking asshole]."

== Commercial performance ==
In the week of Ye being released, "Wouldn't Leave" debuted on the US Billboard Hot 100 at number 24. The song also entered the US Streaming Songs chart at number 11, with 26.3 million streams, and reached number 14 on the US Hot R&B/Hip-Hop Songs chart that same week. The song descended 68 places to number 92 on the Hot 100 the following week, becoming the largest declining track from the album. On September 23, 2020, "Wouldn't Leave" was certified gold by the Recording Industry Association of America (RIAA) for selling 500,000 certified units in the United States.

The song had its best chart performance in New Zealand, reaching number 21 on the NZ Singles Chart. Similarly, it charted at number 24 on the Canadian Hot 100. On the Irish Singles Chart, the song reached number 27. "Wouldn't Leave" debuted at number 33 and 35 on the ARIA Singles Chart and Slovakia Singles Digitál Top 100, respectively. The song also reached the top 100 in Portugal, Greece, and the Czech Republic.

== Credits and personnel ==
Recording

- Recorded at West Lake Ranch, Jackson Hole, Wyoming

Personnel

- Kanye West – production, songwriter
- Ty Dolla Sign – co-production, songwriter, vocals
- Mike Dean – additional production, songwriter, engineering, mixing
- Noah Goldstein – additional production, songwriter recording engineering
- Jeremih – songwriter, vocals
- PartyNextDoor – songwriter, vocals
- Francis Starlite
- Jordan Thorpe – songwriter
- Justin Vernon – songwriter
- Kenneth Pershon – songwriter
- Malik Yusef – songwriter
- Reverend W.A. Donaldson – songwriter
- Terrence Boykin – songwriter
- Mike Malchicoff – engineering
- Zack Djurich – engineering
- Sean Solymar – assistant recording engineering
- Jess Jackson – mixing

Credits adapted from Tidal.

== Charts ==
Chart performance for "Wouldn't Leave"
Chart (2018)	Peak position
Australia (ARIA)	33
Canada Hot 100 (Billboard)	24
Czech Republic Singles Digital (ČNS IFPI)	73
France (SNEP)	153
Greece International Digital Singles (IFPI)	57
Ireland (IRMA)	27
New Zealand (Recorded Music NZ)	21
Portugal (AFP)	54
Slovakia Singles Digital (ČNS IFPI)	35
Swedish Heatseekers (Sverigetopplistan)	12
UK Hip Hop/R&B (Official Charts)	8
UK Audio Streaming (Official Charts)	13
US Billboard Hot 100	24
US Hot R&B/Hip-Hop Songs (Billboard)	14

== Certifications ==
Certifications for "Wouldn't Leave"
Region	Certification	Certified units/sales
United States (RIAA)	Gold	500,000^{‡}
^{‡} Sales+streaming figures based on certification alone.
