= All Mine (Kanye West song) =

Single by Kanye West

from the album Ye
- Released: July 24, 2018
- Recorded: May 2018
- Studio: West Lake Ranch, Jackson Hole, Wyoming
- Genre: Dirty rap; trap; R&B
- Length: 2:25
- Label: GOOD; Def Jam
- Songwriters: Kanye West; Anthony Clemons; Cydel Young; Danielle Balbuena; Dexter Mills; Francis Starlite; Jeremy Felton; Jordan Thorpe; Kenneth Pershon; Malik Jones; Mike Dean; Terrence Boykin; Tyrone Griffin, Jr.; Uforo Ebong
- Producer: Kanye West

Kanye West singles chronology
"Yikes" (2018)	"All Mine" (2018)	"XTCY" (2018)

Lyric video
- "All Mine" on YouTube

Ye track listing
- 7 tracks: 1. "I Thought About Killing You"; 2. "Yikes"; 3. "All Mine"; 4. "Wouldn't Leave"; 5. "No Mistakes"; 6. "Ghost Town"; 7. "Violent Crimes"

"All Mine" is a song by American rapper Kanye West from his eighth studio album, Ye (2018). The song features vocals from American singers Ty Dolla Sign and Ant Clemons. The song's production relies on a simplistic drum-led style and was primarily handled by West, while it was co-produced by Mike Dean and additional production was handled by Francis and the Lights and Scott Carter. West co-wrote the song alongside 13 others, with it later being revealed what lyrics co-writer Consequence was responsible for.

On July 20, 2018, West picked "All Mine" to be the second single from the album. Four days later, the song was released as a single to US rhythmic contemporary radio stations by GOOD Music and Def Jam. It features industrial sounds, alongside organ music. Throughout the song, West defends his dating preferences as well as taking a look at various dating choices and responding to criticism. Controversial lyrics are included within it in reference to Khloé Kardashian's relationship with Tristan Thompson, which she seemingly responded to via Snapchat.

"All Mine" received generally positive reviews from music critics. While most commented on its sexual nature, some critics praised the production and the song's position in West's career. It reached number 11 on the US Billboard Hot 100 in 2018 and charted in numerous other countries, including New Zealand and Australia. The song has since been certified triple platinum and platinum in the United States and Brazil by the Recording Industry Association of America and Pro-Música Brasil, respectively. A lyric video for it was released on June 19, 2018, which features visuals reminiscent of the cover art for Ye.

== Background and recording ==
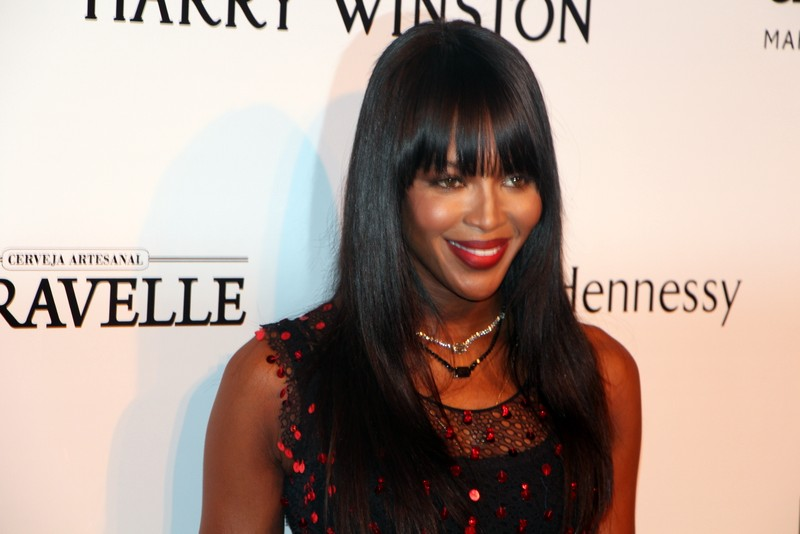
Naomi Campbell, pictured in 2015, is among the multiple celebrities mentioned by West in the track.

"All Mine" originated as a demo by American singer Jeremih, who is credited as a songwriter on the track. Jeremih collaborator Bongo ByTheWay introduced him to the relatively-unknown Ant Clemons, with Bongo ByTheWay having previously recorded 11 records in a single day with Clemons. Jeremih was invited to Wyoming by West for participation in the recording sessions for Ye in 2018 and he played the demo for West, who then performed for it. Clemons saw an increase in fame after working with West.

Along with "All Mine", Ty Dolla Sign contributed vocals on Ye tracks "Violent Crimes" and "Wouldn't Leave". On June 4, 2018, three days after the album's release, a collaborative album with West was teased by Ty Dolla Sign. He recalled "going off on the backgrounds, no Auto-Tune" when working with West in a phone conversation with Rolling Stone on August 30 of that year. American pop project Francis and the Lights had previously released a cover version of West's hit single "Can't Tell Me Nothing" (2007), which West shared a link to via his blog on February 7, 2009. The two subsequently collaborated on the 2016 single "Friends" alongside Bon Iver and the track's music video includes an appearance from West. Outside of "All Mine", Francis and the Lights has production credits on Ye tracks "I Thought About Killing You" and "Ghost Town".

The possessive pronoun "Mine" being included in the title of the song is linked to the subject matter. West had been criticized for dating options in the past, specifically when he dated American model and actress Amber Rose. "All Mine" does not stand as the only song linked to West's perspective of women on the album, as he raps about protecting them on "Violent Crimes".

== Composition and lyrics ==
"All Mine" features an unpolished beat, which includes industrial screeches. Organ music heard in a church is juxtaposed with references to celebrity icons in "All Mine", including Naomi Campbell and Stormy Daniels. The intro of the song consists of Clemons singing and Ty Dolla Sign providing various ad-libs. Falsetto vocals are featured in the intro, which are performed by Clemons. He sings the song's chorus, with the "genie in a bottle" metaphor of the lyrics "Get to rubbin' on my lamp/Get the genie out the bottle" doubling as a sexual innuendo. West defends his dating preferences whilst taking a look at various dating choices within his two verses on the song, as well as responding to critics. The first verse also sees West rap about scandals and affairs, among other forms of infidelity. In West's second verse, crashes of sound are heard every time he raps "Ay".

== Writing and production ==
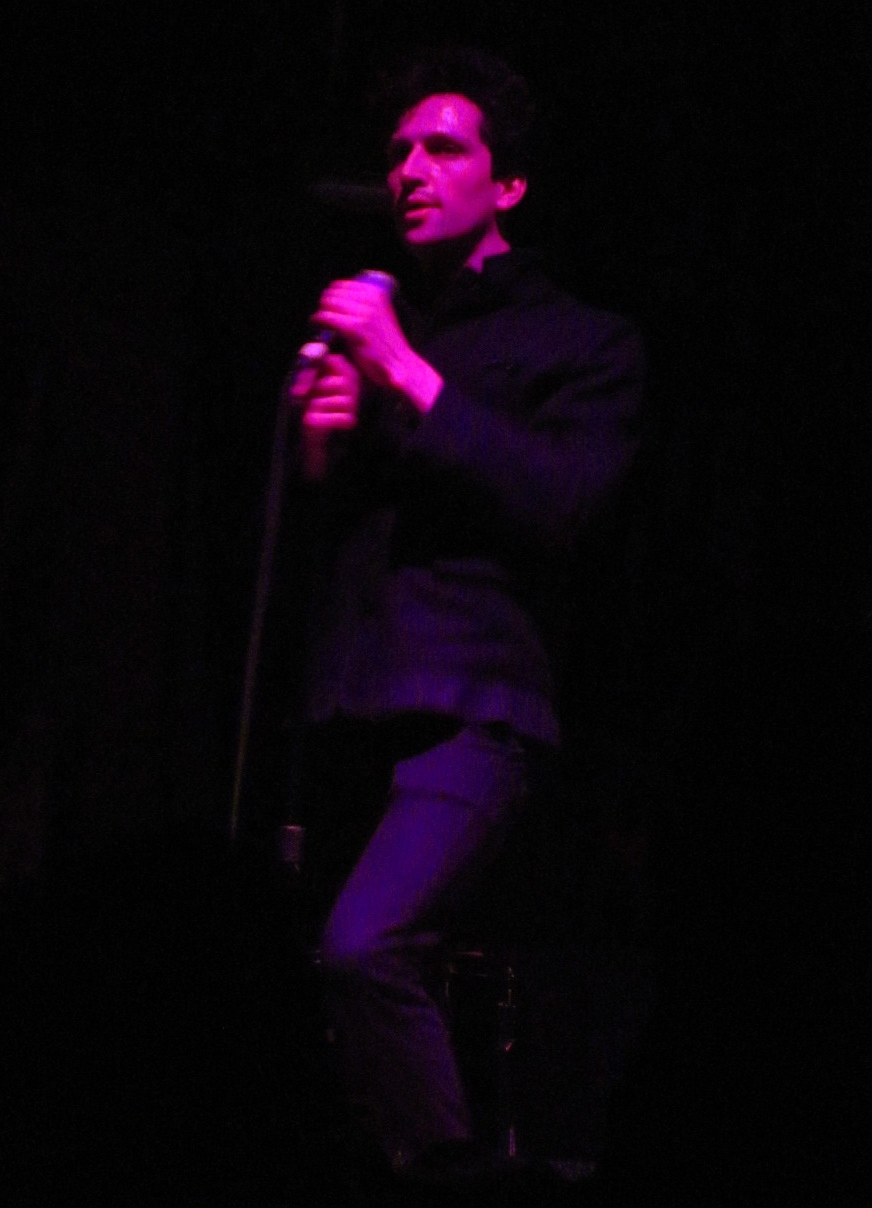
Francis and the Lights, pictured in 2010, helped write and produce the track.

"All Mine" was written by West, Mike Dean, Francis Starlite, Cyhi the Prynce, Consequence, Jeremih, 070 Shake, Clemons, Uforo Ebong, Ty Dolla Sign, Malik Yusef, Kenneth Pershon, Bump J and Pardison Fontaine. It was revealed by West in an interview with The New York Times on June 25, 2018, that co-writer Consequence, credited under his real name of Dexter Mills, was the one who came up with the lyrics "I could have Naomi Campbell/And still might want me a Stormy Daniels." A screenshot of an Instagram photo about West revealing Consequence to have wrote such content was shared to Consequence's Instagram the following month. Alongside the screenshot, Consequence added a caption featuring text about how he only writes for multi-millionaires and/or his loved ones.

West produced the track, with co-production from Dean and additional production from Francis and the Lights, and Scott Carter. Francis and the Lights contributed to both the production and writing of it. The track's production relies on a simplistic drum-led style, with it being where the harmonic progression of the album momentarily stops.

== Release and promotion ==
On June 1, 2018, "All Mine" was released as the third track on West's eighth studio album Ye. West subsequently selected the song as the second single from the album on July 20 of that year, succeeding the lead single "Yikes"; it was set to be serviced to radio stations across the United States in the next week. Despite the first single "Yikes" debuting at #8 on the Billboard Hot 100, West's record labels GOOD Music and Def Jam tried their best to make sure that Ye did not lose momentum by readying a second single to be pushed. The song was the album's top performing track on Spotify in the US at the time of being picked by West for release as a single, sitting at approximately 600,000 streams a day. Four days after being selected as a single by West, it was serviced to US rhythmic contemporary radio stations through his record labels.

A lyric video was officially released for the song on June 19, 2018, along with one for fellow album track "Violent Crimes". The lyric video features a panning view of Jackson Hole with lyrics written over it, visually resembling the official cover art for Ye and the lyrics are written in the same font that appears on the album's cover. West used simplicity for not embellishing more than he needs to. The thumbnail image for the visual was provided by Jewel Samad of Agence France-Presse (AFP). Though the lyric videos were released by West, he had not released any music videos for the album or his collaborative studio album Kids See Ghosts with Kid Cudi, as Kids See Ghosts; West's last released music video was for 2016 single "Fade".

== Critical reception ==
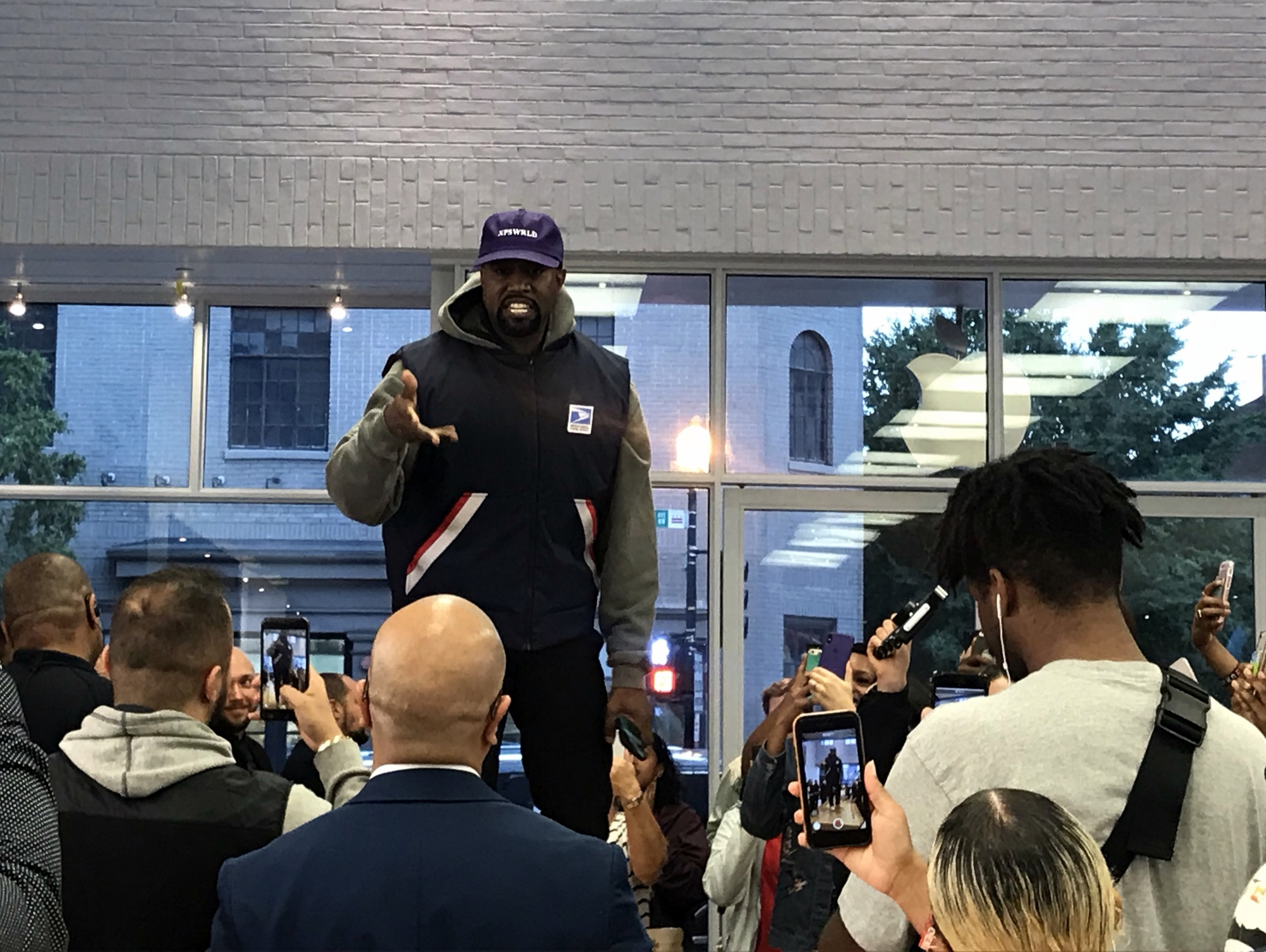
Several critics were complementary towards the position of the song in West's career.

"All Mine" was met with generally positive reviews from music critics, who often noted its sexual nature. Spencer Kornhaber of The Atlantic put forward the idea of the track as being what continues West's "career-long meltdown about monogamy." In reference to the track's position on Ye, Lucy Jones from The Daily Telegraph described it as where West "moves into more explicit territory" and viewed the beat as being "dirty and mechanical," while also writing that it "feels like Life Of Pablo or Yeezus-era Kanye." Sam Moore of Metro pointed out that the song shows West indulging "in one of his favourite pastimes: name-checking celebrities" and noted the sexual nature of West's lyricism. Consequence writer Wren Graves listed it as one of the album's essential tracks. The Independent's Christopher Hooton claimed that the song "has an irresistible bounce to it" and is where "Kanye stamps well-trodden lyrical ground." The song's lyrics "I could have Naomi Campbell/And still might want me a Stormy Daniels" were viewed by Hooton as "just an alternate" to West's lyrics "See I could have me a good girl/And still be addicted to them hood rats" from his 2010 Pusha T-featuring single "Runaway". Clayton Purdom from The A.V. Club labeled the song as a minimal collage "of organ drones, a rotating cast of sinuous hook-men, and what are apparently the best jokes about ejaculate and breast implants Kanye came up with in the past couple years." In Tiny Mix Tapes, Adam Rothbarth praised the way West "uses space and silence" in the song and also complemented its production.

However, not all reviews were positive. Andrew Barker gave the song a negative review for Variety, branding it as being an "embarrassing sex track," and Barker compared the song to West's Yeezus track "I'm In It" (2013). The Guardian's Alexis Petridis opined that the "scampering, falsetto vocals" on the song "quickly grate." For Billboard, Michael Saponara ranked it as the worst track on Ye and commented that the "sultry vocals" set the tone for the song before West's sexualized rapping.

=== Accolades ===
The track ranked as the 85th most streamed song of 2018 worldwide on Apple Music and the year's 67th most streamed in the US. It was voted by listeners of Australian radio station Triple J as the 158th most popular song of 2018. On Run The Trap's list of the Top 25 Hip-Hop Songs Of 2018, the track ranked at number 15, with Aaron Root of the site calling it where "Kanye talks about the topic of infidelity" and claiming that he "goes as far to call out many celebrities for their infidelity."

== Controversy ==
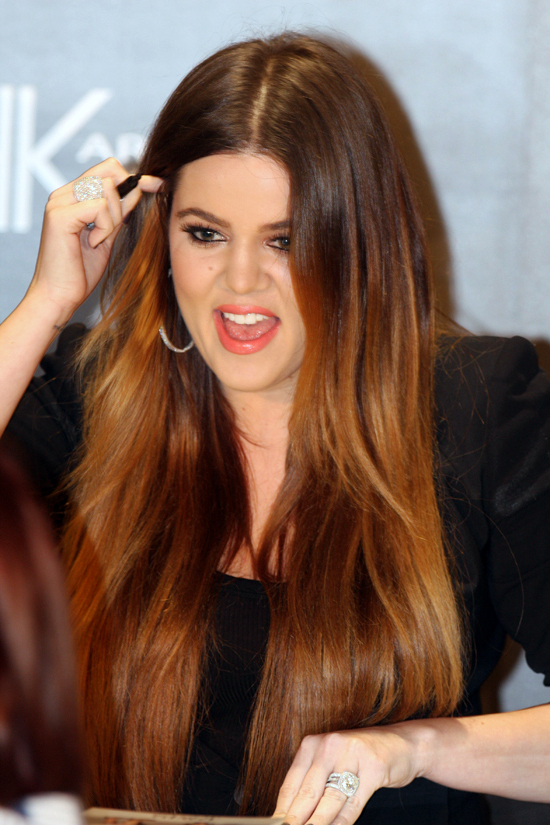
Khloé Kardashian, pictured in 2011, seemed to insult West on Snapchat after he dissed her in the song.

West raps a diss to his sister-in-law Khloé Kardashian over her decision to date Canadian basketball player Tristan Thompson in "All Mine" with the lyrics "All these thots on Christian Mingle/Almost what got Tristan single/If you don't ball like him or Kobe/Guarantee that bitch gon' leave you." Thompson was effectively excluded from family affairs by the Kardashian family, while West's wife Kim Kardashian had previously called the couple's cheating scandal "so fucked up."

One day after the release of Ye, Khloé Kardashian seemingly insulted West by sharing a Snapchat post of her working out to the track "Delicate" (2018) by his rival Taylor Swift, whom West dissed most recently in his 2016 single "Famous" by calling her "that bitch." Despite this, Kardashian had praise for the album overall, tweeting out fire emojis next to its title. Her younger half-sister Kylie Jenner rapped along with the diss to Thompson in a video posted to Jenner's Snapchat at a later date with Anastasia Karanikolaou and the video clip gathered more attention after it surfaced on Instagram.

== Commercial performance ==
Following its release as a single, "All Mine" was a commercial success, charting in a total of 20 countries worldwide in 2018. The song made its debut at number 11 on the US Billboard Hot 100 upon the release of Ye, despite not being released as a single initially, becoming the most streamed song of the week. By topping the US Streaming Songs chart, the song surpassed the entry of West's track "Gone" (2005) at number four in 2013 for the title of his highest debut on the chart, while giving West his first number one by exceeding his previous peak position of number two attained by "Bound 2" that same year. The streams were counted at 36.3 million, while 6,000 digital sales were logged. That same week, the song entered at number nine on the US Hot R&B/Hip-Hop Songs chart and marked West's 26th entry in the top 10; "All Mine" and "Yikes" became West's first top 10 singles on the chart since "All Day" in 2015. In total, the song remained on the Hot 100 for nine weeks. It ranked at number 96 on the year-end US Billboard Hot R&B/Hip-Hop Songs chart for 2018. On September 21, 2018, the track was certified platinum by the Recording Industry Association of America (RIAA) for amassing 1,000,000 certified units in the US, around two months after having been released as a single. This made it the first track from Ye to achieve the certification and the song became West's first platinum single in the US since the 2016 GOOD Music collaborative single "Champions". The former was later awarded a triple platinum certification by the RIAA for pushing 3,000,000 certified units in the country on June 14, 2023. On the NZ Singles Chart and Slovakia's Singles Digitál Top 100, the song performed best by peaking at number five on both of the charts, respectively. On the ARIA Singles Chart, the song debuted at number 12. The following week, it rose two places to number 10. The song reached number 11 on the UK Singles Chart, standing as West's second highest entry on the chart issue that fell on his 41st birthday and also gave him his third top 40 entry for that issue. On January 31, 2025, "All Mine" was certified gold by the British Phonographic Industry for sales of 400,000 units in the United Kingdom. The song also entered the top 20 of the charts in Portugal, Ireland, Greece, Estonia, and Canada. On May 13, 2022, it was awarded a gold certification by the Associação Fonográfica Portuguesa for sales of 5,000 units in Portugal.

However, the song experienced a lesser degree of success on charts in other countries. "All Mine" charted at number 23 on the Norwegian Singles Chart. It reached similar positions of numbers 25 and 26 on the Czech Republic Singles Digitál Top 100 and Danish Tracklisten chart respectively. The song also reached the top 40 of the Swedish Sverigetopplistan chart, Icelandic Singles Chart and Ö3 Austria Top 40. On the Schweizer Hitparade chart, it peaked at number 43 and charted at a similar position of number 46 on the Netherlands Single Top 100. "All Mine" reached number 75 on both the Official German Chart and French SNEP chart. The track experienced its worst performance on the FIMI Singles Chart, peaking at number 96. In 2024, "All Mine" was certified platinum by Pro-Música Brasil for pushing 40,000 certified units in Brazil, standing as one of West's three singles to receive a certification there.

== Credits and personnel ==
Recording

- Recorded at West Lake Ranch, Jackson Hole, Wyoming

Personnel

- Kanye West – production, songwriter
- Mike Dean – co-production, songwriter, engineering, mixing
- Francis and the Lights – additional production
- Scott Carter – additional production
- Ant Clemons – songwriter, vocals
- Ty Dolla Sign – songwriter, vocals
- Cydel Young – songwriter
- Danielle Balbuena – songwriter
- Dexter Mills – songwriter
- Francis Starlite – songwriter
- Jeremy Felton – songwriter
- Jordan Thorpe – songwriter
- Kenneth Pershon – songwriter
- Malik Yusef – songwriter
- Terrence Boykin – songwriter
- Uforo Ebong – songwriter
- Andrew Dawson – engineering, programming
- Mike Malchicoff – engineering
- Zack Djurich – engineering
- Sean Solymar – assistant recording engineering
- Jess Jackson – mixing

Credits adapted from Tidal.

== Charts ==
=== Weekly charts ===
Chart performance for "All Mine"
Chart (2018)	Peak position
Australia (ARIA)	10
Austria (Ö3 Austria Top 40)	36
Belgium (Ultratip Bubbling Under Flanders)	7
Belgium Urban (Ultratop Flanders)	8
Belgium (Ultratip Bubbling Under Wallonia)	31
Canada Hot 100 (Billboard)	12
Czech Republic Singles Digital (ČNS IFPI)	25
Denmark (Tracklisten)	26
Estonia (Eesti Tipp-40)	16
France (SNEP)	75
Germany (GfK)	75
Greece International Digital Singles (IFPI)	6
Hungary (Stream Top 40)	14
Iceland (Tónlistinn)	30
Ireland (IRMA)	13
Italy (FIMI)	96
Netherlands (Single Top 100)	46
New Zealand (Recorded Music NZ)	5
Norway (VG-lista)	23
Portugal (AFP)	19
Slovakia Singles Digital (ČNS IFPI)	5
Sweden (Sverigetopplistan)	30
Switzerland (Schweizer Hitparade)	43
UK Singles (Official Charts)	11
UK Hip Hop/R&B (Official Charts)	4
US Billboard Hot 100	11
US Hot R&B/Hip-Hop Songs (Billboard)	9
US Rhythmic Airplay (Billboard)	29
US Streaming Songs (Billboard)	1

=== Year-end charts ===
2018 year-end chart performance for "All Mine"
Chart (2018)	Position
Belgium Urban (Ultratop Flanders)	80
US Hot R&B/Hip-Hop Songs (Billboard)	96

== Certifications ==
Certifications for "All Mine"
Region	Certification	Certified units/sales
Brazil (Pro-Música Brasil)	Platinum	40,000^{‡}
Denmark (IFPI Danmark)	Gold	45,000^{‡}
New Zealand (RMNZ)	Platinum	30,000^{‡}
Portugal (AFP)	Gold	5,000^{‡}
United Kingdom (BPI)	Gold	400,000^{‡}
United States (RIAA)	3× Platinum	3,000,000^{‡}
^{‡} Sales+streaming figures based on certification alone.

== Release history ==
Release dates and formats for "All Mine"
Region	Date	Format	Label(s)	Ref.
United States	July 24, 2018	Rhythmic contemporary radio	GOOD; Def Jam	

== See also ==
- 2018 in hip hop music
- List of number-one Billboard Streaming Songs of 2018
- List of top 10 singles in 2018 (Australia)
