= I Thought About Killing You =

Song by Kanye West

from the album Ye
- Released: June 1, 2018
- Recorded: 2018
- Studio: West Lake Ranch, Jackson Hole, Wyoming
- Genre: Spoken word, hip hop
- Length: 4:34
- Label: GOOD; Def Jam
- Songwriters: Kanye West; Benjamin Levin; Cydel Young; Dexter Mills; Francis Starlite; Joseph Adenuga; Kenneth Pershon; Malik Jones; Mike Dean; Richard Cowie; Terrence Boykin
- Producers: Ye; Francis and the Lights; Benny Blanco

Ye track listing
- 7 tracks: 1. "I Thought About Killing You"; 2. "Yikes"; 3. "All Mine"; 4. "Wouldn't Leave"; 5. "No Mistakes"; 6. "Ghost Town"; 7. "Violent Crimes"

"I Thought About Killing You" is a song by American rapper Kanye West, released as the opening track on his eighth studio album, Ye (2018). The song was produced by West himself, Francis and the Lights, and Benny Blanco, with additional production from Mike Dean, Andy C and Aaron Lammer. The production is driven by repetitive a cappella intonations, which play in the background. The lyrical content of the song centers around West's thoughts of suicide and homicide, delivered in both rapping and spoken word. West imparted that he has had suicidal thoughts in an interview with The New York Times.

"I Thought About Killing You" received generally positive reviews from music critics, with some directing praise towards its lyrical content and the beat switch, though other critics expressed negative feelings of such content. The original version of the song contained an unlicensed sample of "Fr3sh" by Kareem Lofty. The sample was removed in November 2018 after legal action was threatened by Lofty's record label, PAN. Though not released as a single, the song peaked at number 28 on the US Billboard Hot 100, while reaching top 40 positions on the Canadian Hot 100 and Irish Singles Chart. It has received a gold certification in the United States by the Recording Industry Association of America.

== Background and recording ==
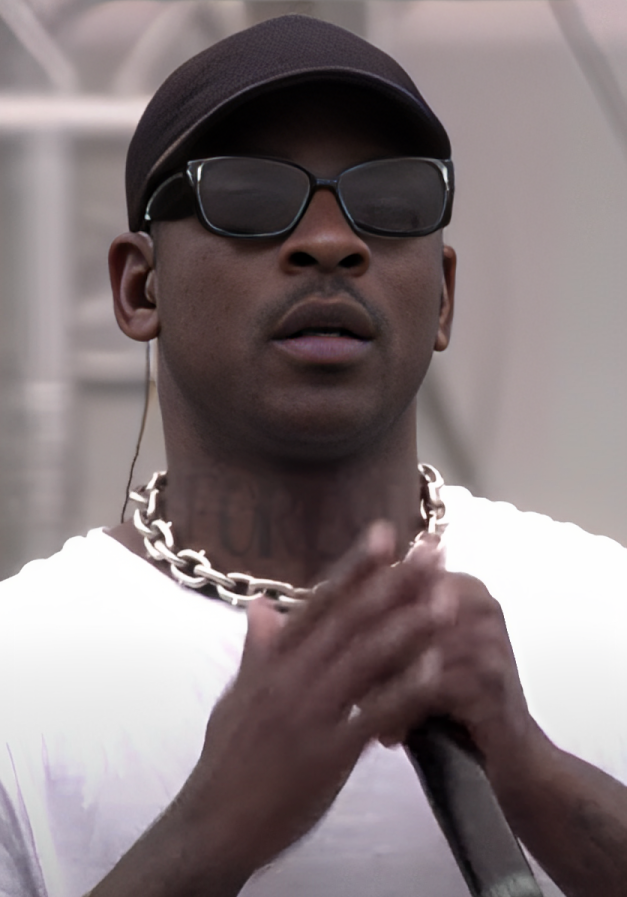
British rapper Skepta served as one of the co-writers of the song, although he did not receive credit until an update after the album's release.

West first worked with American pop project Francis and the Lights on their 2016 single "Friends" alongside Bon Iver; he appeared in the song's music video. In addition to "I Thought About Killing You", Francis and the Lights helped produce Ye tracks "All Mine" and "Ghost Town". The project produced the song with West and Benny Blanco, while additional production was handled by Mike Dean, Andy C and Aaron Lammer. British grime rapper Wiley commented on West's TMZ interview in which he suggested slavery was a choice via Twitter on May 3, 2018, claiming in one of his tweets that "Slavery was not a choice it was forced upon us. We were born into it." Despite tweeting out against his remarks, Wiley described West as "very smart." The contributions of Wiley and fellow rapper Skepta weren't revealed until the credits of Ye were updated on June 14, 2018, to show them as co-writers on "I Thought About Killing You". It stands along with "Yikes" as one of only two tracks on the album where the vocals are solely by West.

West explained that he has had contemplations of suicide during an interview with The New York Times on June 25, 2018; the album was recorded that same year. When asked to what degree song's title was literal and metaphoric, West replied, "Oh yeah, I've thought about killing myself all the time. It's always an option and [expletive]. Like Louis C.K. said, I flip through the manual. I weigh all the options. I'm just having this epiphany now because I didn't do it, but I did think it all the way through. But if I didn't think it all the way through, then it's actually maybe more of a chance of it happening." On June 14, 2018, West posted a tweet that indicated his thoughts linked to the song were about killing his ego, and West revealed that without his ego he is "Just Ye," giving potential context into why West titled his album as such. West's then-wife Kim Kardashian posted a photo to her Instagram with the caption "I thought about killing you" on August 15, though did not directly reference him.

The original version of the song contains an uncredited sample from "Fr3sh", as performed by Kareem Lotfy. Bill Kouligas, head of Lotfy's label PAN, criticized West for the unlicensed sample and indicated intent to pursue legal action, saying "It's sadly another case of an artist who capitalizes on culture without any original ideas" and calling West "the ultimate narcissist." Francis and the Lights, who produced the track with West, took responsibility for the sampling and apologized, saying that he would be "reaching out" to rectify the issue and that the sample was added "at the last minute." On November 7, 2018, an alternative version of the album on streaming services revealed the song with its sample removed and the beat revised.

On the night of the album's premiere, West said that specific lyrics had been cut from it after his controversial interview with TMZ in which he made comments about slavery. On June 7, 2018, six days after the release of Ye, the clean version of "I Thought About Killing You" had the lyric "Sorry, but I chose not to be no slave" added at approximately three minutes and 30 seconds into the song in reference to those comments. The line has not been added to the explicit version of the song.

== Composition and lyrics ==
West delivers rap and spoken word lyrics over a cappella voices intoning "I know, I know" in the song, which sees him express thoughts about killing himself and someone else. It stands along with "Yikes" as one of the occasions where West addresses his mental health on the album. The song begins with the line "The most beautiful thoughts are always besides the darkest," which is a thesis by West. At precisely two minutes and 20 seconds into the song, West begins to rap after having delivered spoken word and soft drums kick in at this point. When rapping, West mispronounces "cache" as "cash-ay" at one point, which may have been purposeful due to his history with neologisms. A lyric is left unfinished by West in one of his lines with "Mhm, I don't see no, mhm, yeah, I don't see no, mhm, mhm." The uncredited sample from "Fr3sh" by Kareem Lotfy within the original version is used for a beat switch at precisely 3:10.

== Release and promotion ==
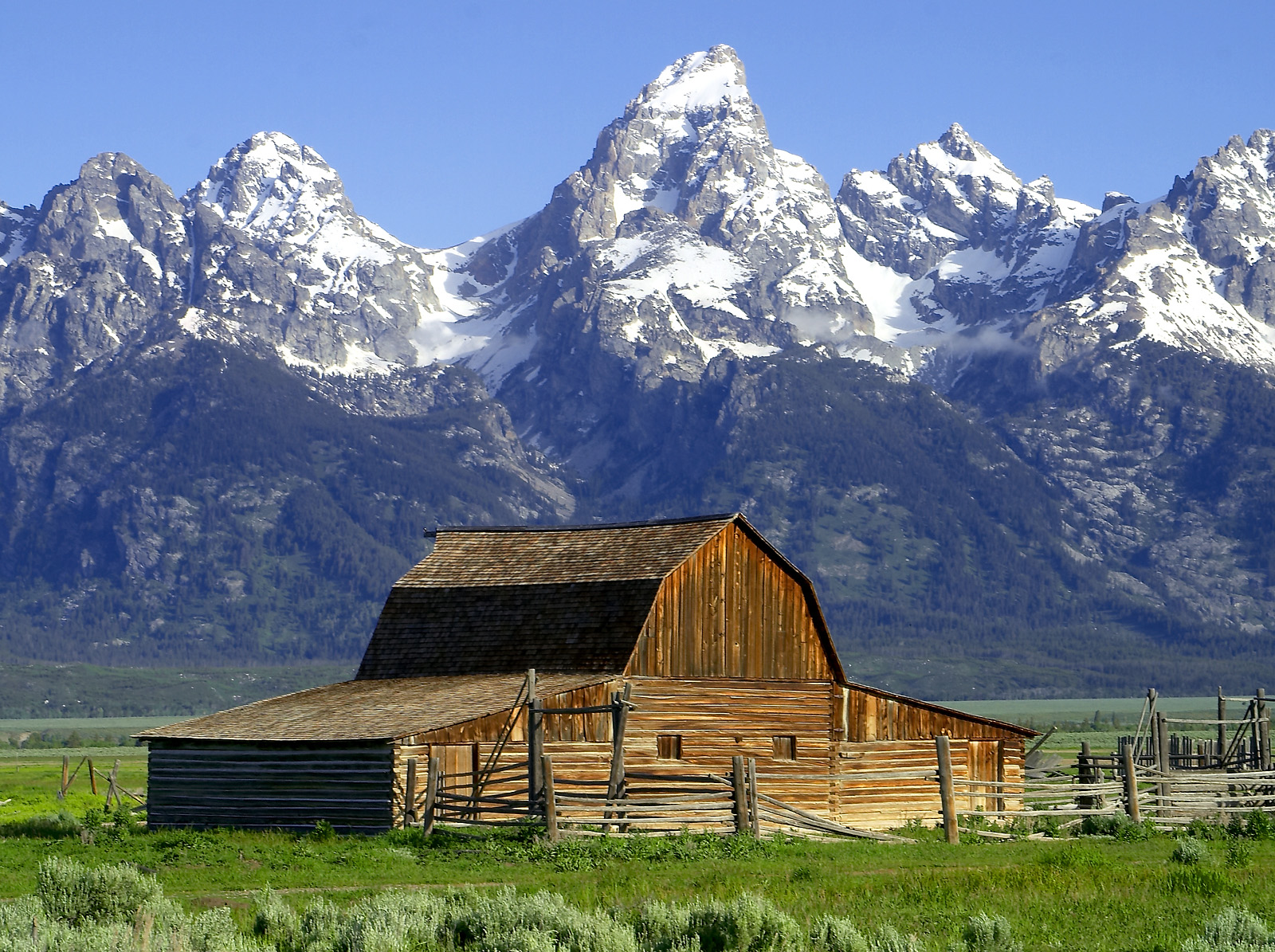
The song was played during the listening party for Ye in Jackson Hole.

"I Thought About Killing You" was released on June 1, 2018, as the first track on West's eighth studio album Ye. It stands as the longest song on the album, running for a total of 4:34. A promotional video was displayed on the official website of West from the album's listening party that included "I Thought About Killing You" and "Ghost Town" being played, though the website was later updated on October 22, 2019. The listening party was convened by West on the night before the release of Ye in Jackson Hole, Wyoming, which is the same place that West recorded the album. Co-writer Cyhi the Prynce was among the attendees at the listening party. Kid Cudi walked down the runway to the song at a fashion show of Virgil Abloh during 2018 Paris Fashion Week, where West was in attendance.

== Critical reception ==
The song was met with mixed to positive reviews from music critics, who were somewhat divided in their opinions towards West's lyricism and the beat switch. In a highly positive review, Christopher Hooton from The Independent analysed the song as something that "has shades of the Kanye genius of yore, showing the instinctive command of melody of a musical aesthete who builds momentum in a song like no other" and Hooton also praised the beat switch, noting it as being addictive. Douglas Greenwood of NME described the song's position on the album as being "a bold opener lyrically" and what is "made even darker by the fact he seems to abandons the song's style two thirds of the way through," with Greenwood viewing it as becoming a totally new track after the style is abandoned by West. Reviewing Ye for Exclaim!, Kyle Mullin viewed the song's vocal effects employed by West "that help him evoke the myriad voices that ring in a deranged mind" as being one of the "moments devoted to mental health" that truly give the album a purpose. In response to West's performance, Zachary Hoskins from Slant Magazine wrote "'Sometimes I think really bad things,' he confesses on the stark, harrowing opener 'I Thought About Killing You,' his voice dipping into an artificial chopped-and-screwed baritone. 'Really, really, really bad things.'" Courtney E. Smith of Refinery29 viewed the song as "a track punctuated by screams that deals with heavy themes of death and violence" and described it as feeling "eerie to listen to these dark thoughts next to that dark production from Mike Dean," looking at Dean's production as combining synths and dirty bass, while claiming that the gloom should be attributed "to West (think of Bey's 'Partition' verses West's 'Monster,' which encapsulate the different directions in which an artist can push Dean's signature sound)."

Alexis Petridis was more mixed in The Guardian, claiming that despite there being "something audacious about the way 'I Thought About Killing You' suddenly turns into a completely different track three-quarters of the way through, neither of its two contrasting parts are anything to write home about." The staff of XXL noted West's "series of spoken word phrases" within the track for being repetitive, while claiming that the phrases are succeeded by him "launching into a completely unrelated rap that offers no real payoff" and cited the track as an example of "waiting for moments of enlightenment or engagement that ultimately never arrive" on Ye. In reference to the lyrics "Sometimes I think bad things... Really, really, really bad things," Andrew Barker of Variety criticized the album's "emotional trajectory" for being "fairly obvious, beginning with West at his lowest" and slammed the song as "his pitch shifting ever downward to a woozy, demonic register." In Consequence of Sound, Wren Graves claimed that "some of that Life of Pablo rambling starts to creep in" when the first two minutes of the track "feel repetitive after just a few listens." Ross Horton from The Line of Best Fit characterized the track as "comically bad" and being "an interesting, sinister concept that is executed in so poorly that you begin to question where the record is going."

== Commercial performance ==
Following the release of Ye, the song made its debut on the US Billboard Hot 100 at number 28. The song received 23.4 million streams, leading to an entry at number 15 on the US Streaming Songs chart. Simultaneously, it reached number 17 on the US Hot R&B/Hip-Hop Songs chart. On September 23, 2020, "I Thought About Killing You" was certified gold by the Recording Industry Association of America (RIAA) for sales of 500,000 certified units in the United States.

In Canada, the song entered at number 28 on the Canadian Hot 100. On the Irish Singles Chart, the song debuted at number 34. It reached number 41 on the ARIA Singles Chart and charted similarly on Slovakia's Singles Digitál Top 100, reaching number 43 on the chart. The song charted at number 52 and 53 on the Greece International Digital Singles chart and Portuguese Singles Chart, respectively. It debuted at number 74 on the Czech Republic Singles Digitál Top 100. "I Thought About Killing You" entered at number 125 on the French SNEP chart, standing as the album's highest charting non-single in France.

== Credits and personnel ==
Recording

- Recorded at West Lake Ranch, Jackson Hole, Wyoming

Personnel

- Kanye West – production, songwriter
- Benny Blanco – production, songwriter
- Francis and the Lights – production
- Mike Dean – additional production, songwriter, engineering, mixing
- Andy C – additional production
- Aaron Lammer – additional production
- Cydel Young – songwriter
- Dexter Mills – songwriter
- Francis Starlite – songwriter
- Joseph Adenuga Olaitan – songwriter
- Kenneth Pershon – songwriter
- Malik Yusef – songwriter
- Richard Cowie – songwriter
- Terrence Boykin – songwriter
- Mike Malchicoff – engineering
- Zack Djurich – engineering
- Sean Solymar – assistant recording engineering
- Jess Jackson – mixing

Credits adapted from Tidal.

== Charts ==
Chart performance for "I Thought About Killing You"
Chart (2018)	Peak position
Australia (ARIA)	41
Canada Hot 100 (Billboard)	28
Czech Republic Singles Digital (ČNS IFPI)	74
France (SNEP)	125
Greece International Digital Singles (IFPI)	52
Ireland (IRMA)	34
New Zealand Heatseekers (RMNZ)	1
Portugal (AFP)	53
Slovakia Singles Digital (ČNS IFPI)	43
UK Hip Hop/R&B (Official Charts)	9
UK Audio Streaming (Official Charts)	18
US Billboard Hot 100	28
US Hot R&B/Hip-Hop Songs (Billboard)	17

== Certifications ==
Certifications for "I Thought About Killing You"
Region	Certification	Certified units/sales
United States (RIAA)	Gold	500,000^{‡}
^{‡} Sales+streaming figures based on certification alone.

== See also ==
- 2018 in hip hop music
