= Violent Crimes (song) =

Song by Kanye West

from the album Ye
- Released: June 1, 2018
- Recorded: 2018
- Studio: West Lake Ranch, Jackson Hole, Wyoming
- Genre: R&B
- Length: 3:35
- Label: GOOD; Def Jam
- Songwriters: Kanye West; Danielle Balbuena; Irving Lorenzo; James Ireland; Jordan Thorpe; Kevin Parker; Malik Jones; Marcus Vest; Mike Dean; Tyrone Griffin, Jr.
- Producers: Kanye West; Irv Gotti; 7 Aurelius

Lyric video
- "Violent Crimes" on YouTube

Ye track listing
- 7 tracks: 1. "I Thought About Killing You"; 2. "Yikes"; 3. "All Mine"; 4. "Wouldn't Leave"; 5. "No Mistakes"; 6. "Ghost Town"; 7. "Violent Crimes"

"Violent Crimes" is a song by American rapper Kanye West, released as the final track on his eighth studio album, Ye (2018). The song features vocals from Ty Dolla $ign and 070 Shake, along with a voicemail message from Nicki Minaj. It was written by West, 7 Aurelius, Irv Gotti, 070 Shake, Mike Dean, Kevin Parker, Ty Dolla $ign, Malik Yusef, and Pardison Fontaine, and produced by the former three. Fontaine was revealed by West to have contributed to most of the writing, and felt unhappy with him for revealing this information.

A verse was recorded by Chance the Rapper for the song, which was not used. "Violent Crimes" features an R&B background, and West raps about his feelings towards fathering a daughter within his verse. The song received mixed reviews from music critics, who were mostly mixed on West's rapping, while its position as the closing track also faced criticism. However, some critics, who generally placed less focus on West's verse, expressed more positive feelings, often highlighting the inclusion of the song on the album and sometimes complementing the composition. Despite the mixed critical reviews, fan reactions to the song were generally positive praising the gentle production, 070 Shake's vocals and Ye rapping on his fears for his children.

In 2018, "Violent Crimes" reached number 27 on the US Billboard Hot 100 and also attained the top 40 positions on the Canadian Hot 100, Irish Singles Chart, and ARIA Singles Chart. It was certified double platinum and platinum in the United States and the United Kingdom by the Recording Industry Association of America (RIAA) and the British Phonographic Industry (BPI), respectively. An accompanying lyric video was released on June 19, 2018, featuring visuals reminiscent of the cover art for Ye. In January 2019, the Sunday Service Choir performed the song live, led by Ye.

== Background and development ==
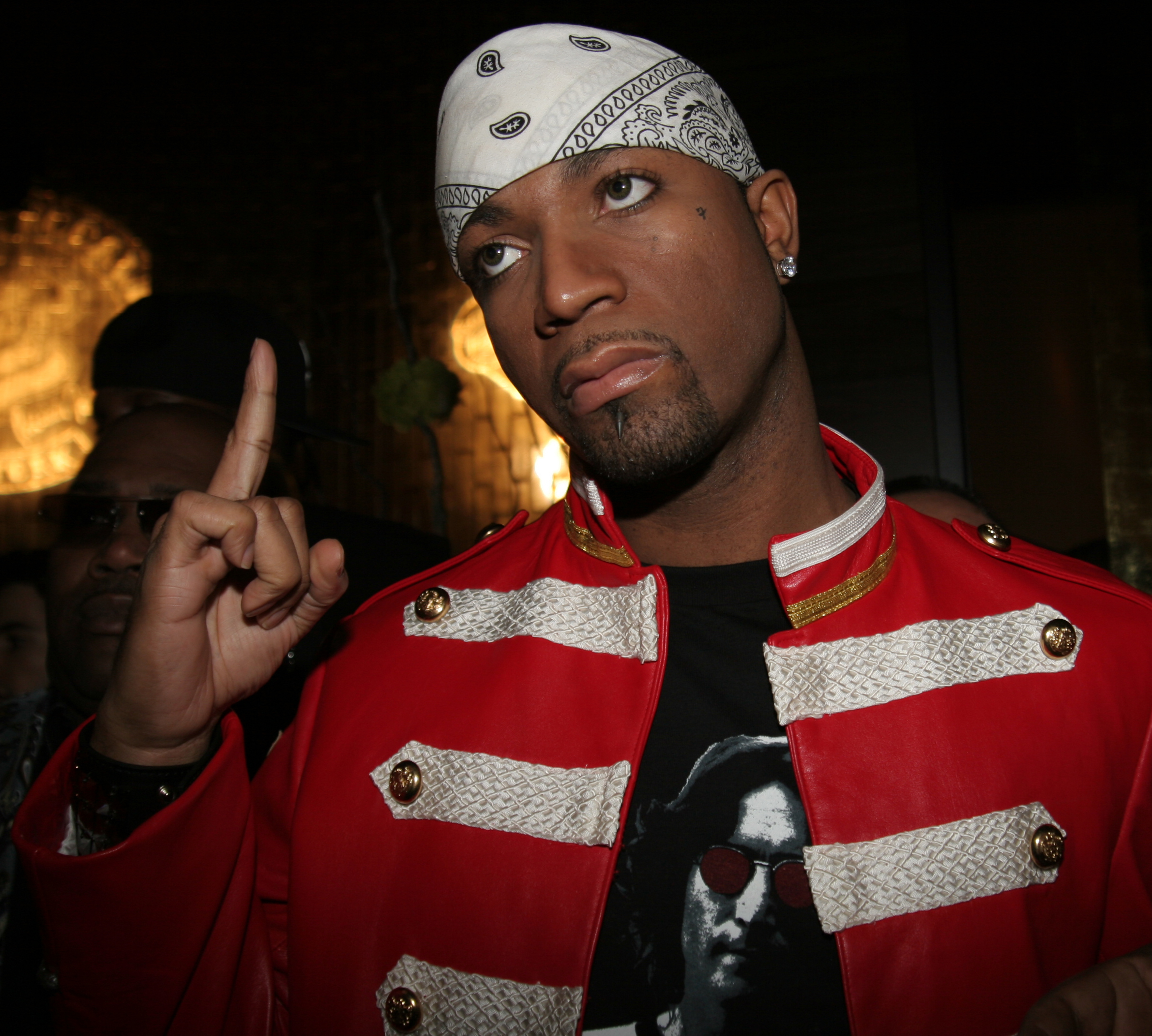
7 Aurelius originally produced the song as "Brothers" and was credited for his contributions.

Along with "Violent Crimes," Ty Dolla $ign also has vocals on the tracks "All Mine" and "Wouldn't Leave." On June 4, 2018, three days after the album's release, Ty Dolla $ign teased a joint album with West. He recalled "going off on the backgrounds, no auto-tune" when working with West in a phone conversation with Rolling Stone on August 30 of that year. 070 Shake saw an increase in popularity after appearing on the track and "Ghost Town" from the album, which was recorded in 2018. When asked in a June 2018 interview with Billboard about how she felt to be a part of the track, 070 Shake was quoted as saying:

Look, it feels good. I love being apart [sic] of [music with a message], no matter who it is. My goal is to be able to impact people in a positive way. So that just made the song that much better.

West asked his wife Kim Kardashian to get Nicki Minaj's help with figuring out how to deliver some lines on "Violent Crimes," yet he ultimately decided on including the actual voice note itself that was received from her. Nicki Minaj revealed on Queen Radio that she was initially surprised when "ye" premiered due to being unsure about how her voice note would end up being used. West had previously collaborated with Nicki Minaj multiple times, notably on his 2010 single "Monster," which features Jay-Z, Rick Ross, and Bon Iver alongside her, which he references with the lines "I hope she like Nicki, I'll make her a monster/Not havin' menages".

Co-writer Kevin Parker of Tame Impala was unaware that the track would be on the album until a friend informed him that it was being played at the listening party; Parker previously thought he was credited on "Ghost Town," not "Violent Crimes." Allegedly, Parker sent a number of samples to West for the album, though he assumed that they hadn't made the cut after not hearing back from him. Prior to co-producer 7 Aurelius receiving credit for the song, he had been inactive musically since 2012. He had originally created aspects of the song for "Brothers", which would later be previewed on the BET show Tales in June of 2019.

== Composition and lyrics ==
"Violent Crimes" is a "lullaby" that includes an R&B background. It is linked to "essentially, since he became a father to a daughter," West knowing "how to treat women better." The song begins with low-key production and long piano tones, with 070 Shake performing the intro as well as the chorus. West's verse sees him rap about thoughts about fathering a daughter from his position, expressing fears of her being victimized by men. The need for West to keep his daughter protected from "pimps," "monsters," and "players" is mentioned by him. By offering ambitions as a father, West attempts to undo his years of misogyny. Ty Dolla $ign contributes softly sung vocals to the song that appear next to those of 070 Shake, prior to Nicki Minaj's outro.

Piercing the silence as the song begins to wind down, Nicki Minaj's vocals on the outro consist of a voice recording in which she semi-speaks, paying reference to lyrics rapped by West in reference to her earlier in the song. It had been rumored for West to be shading Taylor Swift by including the voice recording, since the outro suggests that Nicki Minaj had already approved West's lyrics about her before being featured on the song. The voice recording was interpreted as shade by some because a phone conversation posted by Kardashian between West and Swift in 2016 revealed that he had Swift's approval to mention her in the single "Famous," despite Swift saying she was blindsided by it at the time. Kelli Boyle from Elite Daily described West as shading Swift "in the most blink-and-you'll-miss-it way possible."

== Writing and recording ==
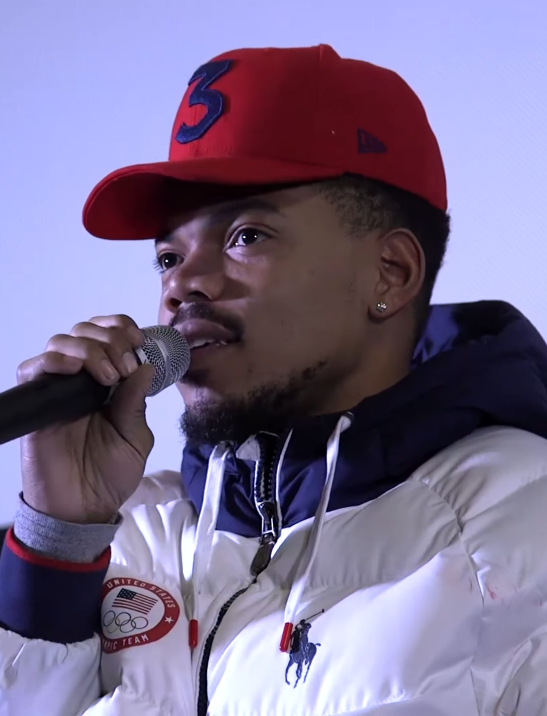
Chance the Rapper recorded a verse for the song, standing as one of his multiple contributions to Ye that were left unused.

On September 30, 2018, West took to Twitter and revealed that co-writer Pardison Fontaine, who has the real name of Jordan Thorpe, was the person held most responsible for writing the track. In West's tweet, he recalled having "changed two lines," though he gave credit to Pardison Fontaine for writing "the entire song." West had endured a similar process with fellow rapper Rhymefest for the writing of the former's single "Jesus Walks" (2004), though he was not as vocal at this time about his writing process. Due to the personal content addressed by West within "Violent Crimes," many people assumed that he wrote it, and the rapper "ended up breaking a few hearts" by revealing that he didn't.

Around two months later, in an interview with GQ, Pardison Fontaine admitted to being "pissed" that West revealed the information about songwriting when saying that nobody "needed to know I hit him about that, like, 'That's not why I do that for'". He elaborated, explaining that, due to wanting to be known as an artist, not just a writer, Pardison Fontaine only writes for people who have his respect, such as West, because he considers him his idol. The two became involved with each other after West tracked down Pardison Fontaine and brought him to Wyoming due to being a co-writer for fellow rapper Cardi B. West stated that the lyrics of hers from the song "Drip" led him to think, "That's something I would have thought of and would like to say."

Pardison Fontaine detailed that the song was inspired by his personal experience of having a daughter, looking at "the duality of the situation" as a man who can take advantage "versus seeing legitimate feelings that are there for a woman." He sang the song over the phone to his daughter's mother from Wyoming, who cried during the call. Pardison Fontaine also revealed that West associate Chance the Rapper recorded a "phenomenal" verse that did not make Ye. Chance the Rapper explained in an interview with fellow rapper Joe Budden that he felt he had wasted two weeks of his time working on the album, declaring that none of his verses or other contributions were used and that he felt affected by the sudden exclusion.

== Release and promotion ==
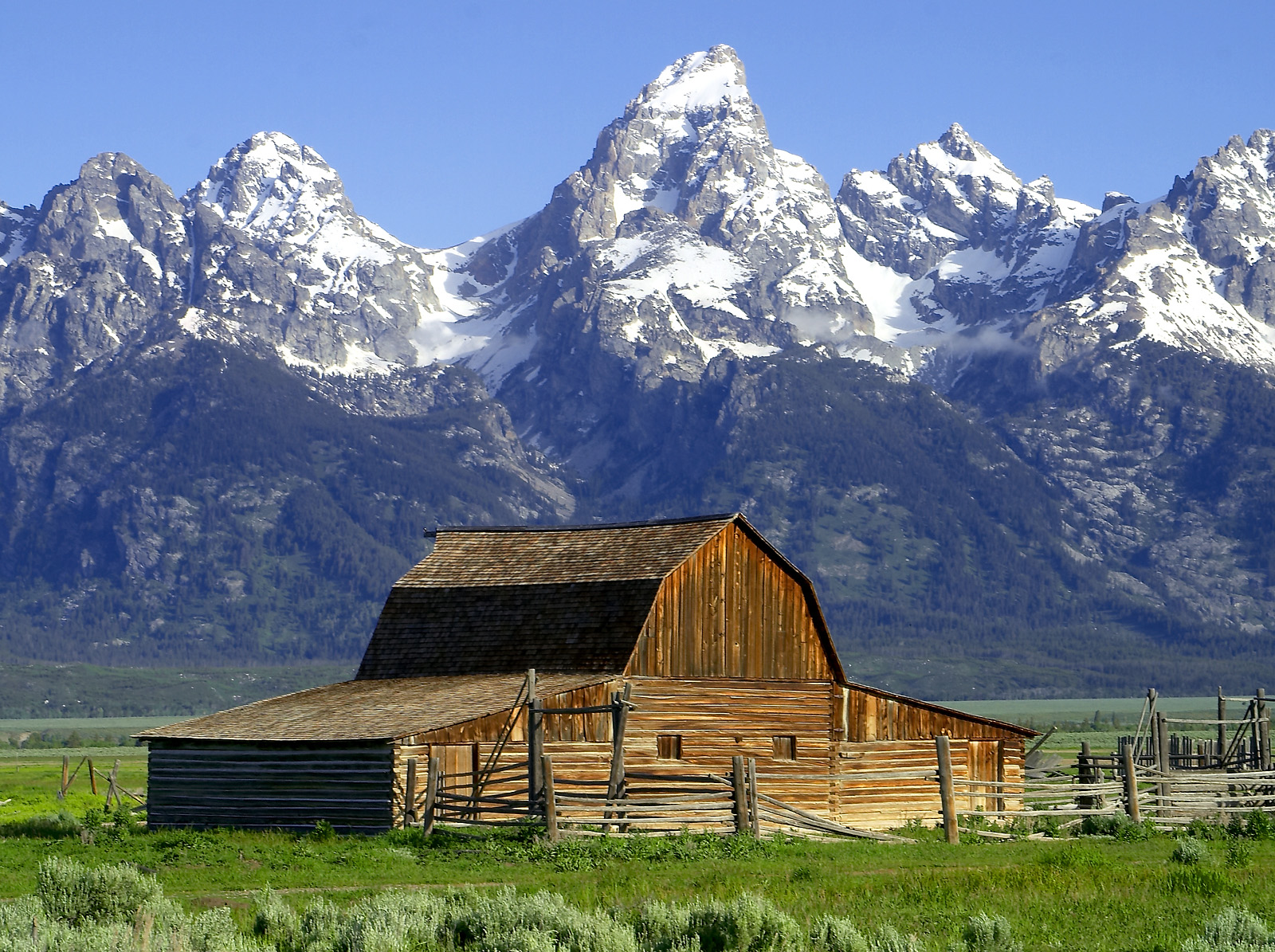
Jackson Hole, Wyoming, which is panned out from in the accompanying lyric video.

"Violent Crimes" was released on June 1, 2018, as the seventh and final track on West's eighth studio album Ye. At the album's listening party on May 31, it was the last track to be played. A lyric video was officially released for the song along with one for fellow Ye track "All Mine" on June 19, 2018. The song's lyric video features a panning view of Jackson Hole with lyrics written over it, visually resembling the official cover art for the album and the lyrics were written out in the same font used for the cover art. West used simplicity to not embellish more than he needs to. Despite not being released as a single, the song was treated as such by a video being released. Jewel Samad from Agence France-Presse (AFP) provided the thumbnail image for the visual. Though West decided on releasing the lyric videos, he had not released any music videos for Ye and his most recent music video was for 2016 single "Fade".

During the first concert of West's gospel group the Sunday Service Choir on January 6, 2019, he led the group in performing a rendition of the song. The rendition was the last song to be performed, with the performance of it beginning at 12 minutes and 19 seconds into the concert. At their second concert two weeks later, the Sunday Service Choir delivered a gospel rendition of "Violent Crimes" and were led through their performance by West again.

== Critical reception ==
The track was met with mixed to negative reviews from music critics, with West's rap verse mostly being criticized. Christopher Hooton of The Independent wrote that it "strains to be an epic closer to an album we only started 21 minutes ago". Similarly, Meaghen Garvey of Pitchfork wrote in reference to the track being the last on Ye: "the eighth Kanye West album, out with a whimper", and opined that West's illustration of fears for his daughter are "in disturbingly specific detail". Clash's Grant Brydon branded the track as seeing West "lazily praying that his daughter be stripped of her femininity to avoid objectification". Courtney E. Smith of Refinery29 slammed "Violent Crimes" for being where West "explained his total lack of understanding about the way women see the world". Rob Sheffield, in his review for Rolling Stone, looked at the song as being a very clumsy end for the album. Hannah Giorgis of The Atlantic noted the song's "Trumpian dissonance" and described it as "Phil Collins-esque", while panning the song's "voyeuristic" tone and West's lyricism. Simon Miraudo from Student Edge wrote that "it inches uncomfortably towards racial respectability politics", which he looked at as being a possible influence from American conservative Candace Owens that West is a fan of. Miraudo continued, stating that the song "calls on the regressive idea that men can only appreciate women after they've sired their own". West's performance was described by Rodney Carmichael and Ann Powers in a less negative review for NPR as what shows him "reaching out to his young daughters in love, but ultimately getting distracted by the idea that other men might hurt them". In a mixed review, the song was viewed as where "with the right software you could very easily remove West's part and have a perfectly fine song" by Jordan Sargent of Spin. In The Line of Best Fit, Ross Horton pointed to the song as doing "a little bit to redeem the record", while criticizing "the recycled wordplay" despite writing that "it appears some effort went into the jazz-backed poetry on show".

However, "Violent Crimes" was positively received by some critics who were generally not as focused on the rapping. Sam Moore, writing for Metro, characterized it as a "blissful climax" to Ye and viewed the song as continuing "good vibes" on the album. Michael Saponara of Billboard ranked it as the third best track from Ye and complemented the voice recording from Nicki Minaj. Vish Khanna from NOW Magazine named the song as the best track. Jon Pareles of The New York Times described the song as "hymnlike". Tyler, the Creator revealed when speaking to GQ in August 2018 that its chords made him cry. For IOL, Mcebo Mpungose praised West's rapping, calling his verse "a warning to his daughters that Men are Trash for most men" and viewed the opening lines of it to be relatable.

== Commercial performance ==
"Violent Crimes" managed to chart in a total of nine countries worldwide. The song performed best in the United States, entering the US Billboard Hot 100 at number 27, following the release of Ye. An entry position of number 14 was attained by the song on the US Streaming Songs chart, with 23.6 million streams being logged. On June 28, 2021, "Violent Crimes" was certified platinum by the Recording Industry Association of America (RIAA) for pushing 1,000,000 certified units in the US. By doing so, it joined "Ghost Town" as one of the two non-singles from Ye to achieve this certification in the country.

On the Canadian Hot 100, the song debuted at number 30. It also managed to reach the top 40 in Ireland and Australia, charting at number 33 and 40 on the Irish Singles Chart and the ARIA Singles Chart, respectively. The song entered at number 56 on Slovakia's Singles Digitál Top 100, while it reached a similar position of number 57 on the Portuguese Singles Chart. It debuted at number 59 on the Greece International Digital Singles chart. On January 24, 2025, "Violent Crimes" was awarded a platinum certification by the British Phonographic Industry (BPI) for shelving 600,000 units in the United Kingdom.

== Credits and personnel ==
Recording

- Recorded at West Lake Ranch, Jackson Hole, Wyoming

Personnel

- Kanye West – production, songwriter
- 7 Aurelius – production, songwriter
- Irv Gotti – production, songwriter
- Mike Dean – songwriter, engineering, mixing
- 070 Shake – songwriter, vocals
- Ty Dolla Sign – songwriter, vocals
- James Ireland – songwriter (Note: Though Pond drummer James Ireland didn't receive credit on the song, he was confirmed to have contributed to it by a rep for Kevin Parker.)
- Jordan Thorpe – songwriter
- Kevin Parker – songwriter
- Malik Yusef – songwriter
- Mike Snell – assistant remix engineer
- Andrew Dawson – engineering, programming
- Mike Malchicoff – engineering
- Zack Djurich – engineering
- Jess Jackson – mixing
- Nicki Minaj – voice

Credits adapted from Tidal.

== Charts ==
Chart performance for "Violent Crimes"
Chart (2018)	Peak position
Australia (ARIA)	40
Canada Hot 100 (Billboard)	30
Czech Republic Singles Digital (ČNS IFPI)	100
France (SNEP)	167
Greece International Digital Singles (IFPI)	59
Ireland (IRMA)	33
New Zealand Heatseekers (RMNZ)	2
Portugal (AFP)	57
Slovakia Singles Digital (ČNS IFPI)	56
UK Audio Streaming (Official Charts)	27
US Billboard Hot 100	27
US Hot R&B/Hip-Hop Songs (Billboard)	16

== Certifications ==
Certifications for "Violent Crimes"
Region	Certification	Certified units/sales
Denmark (IFPI Danmark)	Platinum	90,000^{‡}
France (SNEP)	Gold	100,000^{‡}
Italy (FIMI)	Gold	50,000^{‡}
New Zealand (RMNZ)	2× Platinum	60,000^{‡}
Poland (ZPAV)	Gold	25,000^{‡}
United Kingdom (BPI)	Platinum	600,000^{‡}
United States (RIAA)	2× Platinum	2,000,000^{‡}
^{‡} Sales+streaming figures based on certification alone.

== See also ==
- 2018 in hip hop music
- Brothers (Kanye West song)
