= XTC (disambiguation) =

XTC is an English band.

XTC may also refer to:

== Music ==
- XTC (album), a 1996 album by Anthony Hamilton
- "XTC" (Elgar), a 1930 song by Elgar
- "X-T-C", a song by Accept from Eat the Heat
- "XTC, the opening theme to the Witchblade anime series, performed by Psychic Lover
- "XTC Acid", a song by SOPHIE from Oil of Every Pearl's Un-Insides Non-Stop Remix Album

== Other uses ==
- MDMA or XTC, an empathogenic drug
- Diehl AeroNautical XTC Hydrolight, an ultralight aircraft

== See also ==
- Ecstasy (disambiguation)
- Ivans Xtc, a 2000 film by Bernard Rose
- XML Telemetric and Command Exchange (XTCE), a format for spacecraft telemetry and command meta-data
