= Shadi Al-Atallah =

Saudi Arabian artist, illustrator (born 1994)

- Born: 1994 (age 31–32); Saudi Arabia
- Education: Camberwell College of Arts (BA), Royal College of Art (MA)
- Occupations: Visual artist, illustrator
- Known for: Painting

Shadi Al-Atallah (born 1994) is a Saudi Arabian visual artist and illustrator, living in London. Al-Atallah's prounouns are they/them. They are known for paintings that are an exploration of the self and body, as well as conflicted emotional states.

== Life and career ==
Shadi Al-Atallah was born in 1994, in Saudi Arabia. Alatallah is queer, and their pronouns are they/them. They graduated in 2018 with a BA degree in illustration from Camberwell College of Arts at the University of the Arts London; and in 2021 with a MA degree in painting from the Royal College of Art.

Al-Atallah’s artistic practice centers on the human body and the moments of physiological and psychological transformation. Their works often depict fragmented, indistinct or intertwined figures, emphasizing intimacy and vulnerability. Recent projects explore the concept of holes and voids as sites of transformation, drawing on reference from mythology and religion to examine masculinity, power, and desire.

Al-Atallah has held numerous solo exhibitions, including "Cobra" at project Elizabeth West Bower Gallery, and "The Hole" at Niru Ratnam Gallery in London. Their artwork was used on the cover for American rapper Kanye West's singles, I Love It (2018), and XTCY (2018).
