= List of Billboard Streaming Songs number ones of 2018 =

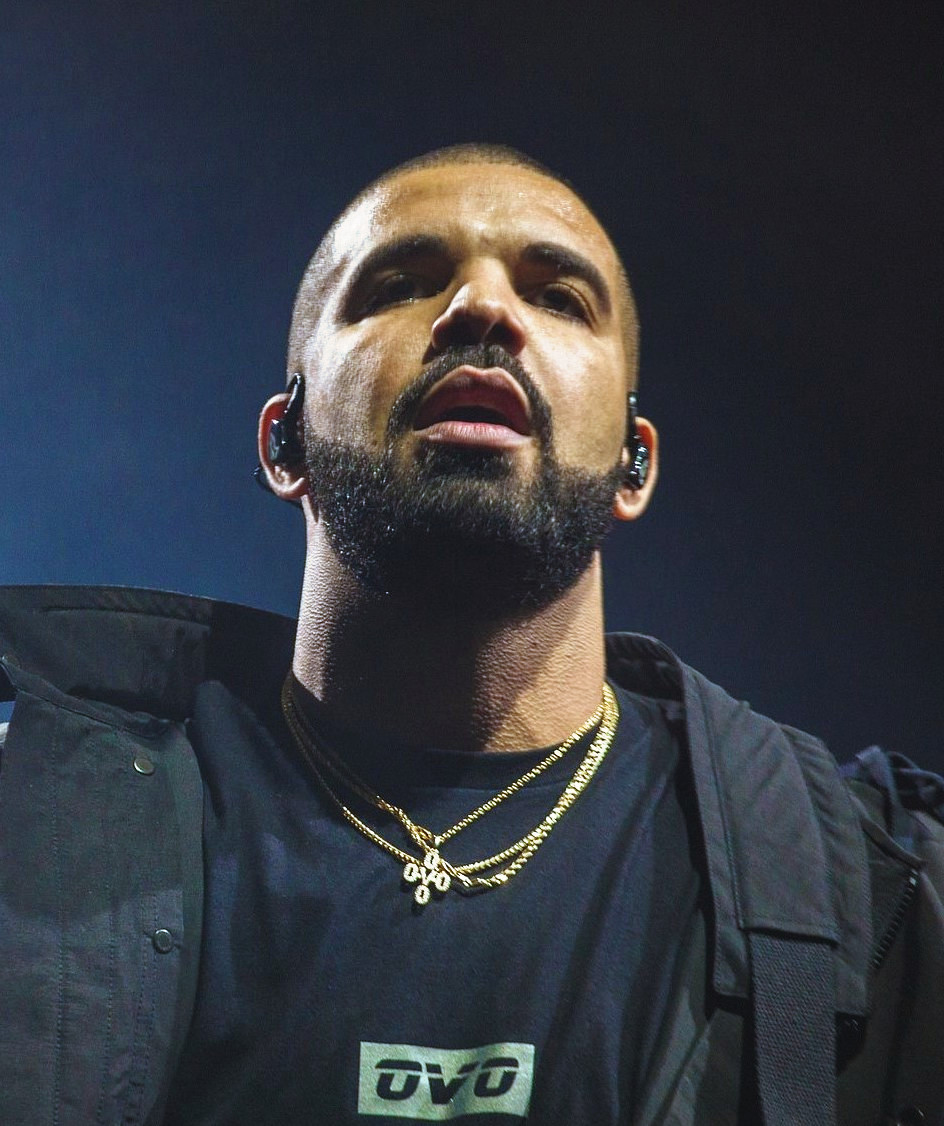
Four songs of Drake (pictured in 2016) topped the chart for a total of 22 weeks. "God's Plan", topped the charts for eleven weeks and was the most-streamed song of the year, accumulating more than 1.5 billion streams. "In My Feelings" had the highest weekly streams ever at the time, with more than 116 million and was streamed more than 1.1 billion times in 2018.

The Billboard Streaming Songs chart ranks each week's most-streamed radio songs, on-demand songs and videos on leading online music services in the United States. In 2018, 20 songs by 24 artist reached the top.

The first number one song of the year was Ed Sheeran's "Perfect" alongside Beyoncé. Post Malone's and 21 Savage's "Rockstar" spent 12 weeks atop in late 2017 and topped the chart for two more weeks in January for a total of 14 weeks. "God's Plan" by Canadian musician Drake reached the top in early February and topped the charts for 11 consecutive weeks. Furthermore, it became the second song to be ever streamed more than 100 million times within one week, since Baauer's "Harlem Shake" in early 2013. Drake replaced himself with "Nice for What" for four weeks in April and May.

Childish Gambino scored his first number one on the chart with "This is America" for three weeks in May and early June. Following the murder of XXXTentacion in Florida, his single "Sad!" became his first to top the chart for two weeks. Drake scored his third and fourth number-one hit in 2018 with "Nonstop" and "In My Feelings" for nine more weeks. Furthermore, "In My Feelings" became the most-streamed songs within a week, accumulating more than 116 million streams—13 million more than "Harlem Shake". Moreover, "In My Feelings" was the third most streamed song of the year, accumulating more than 1.1 billion streams.

Drake was the most-successful artist of the year. "God's Plan", "In My Feelings" and "Nice for What" ranked in the top ten most-streamed songs in the US for 2018. "God's Plan" concluded as the most-streamed song in 2018, with more than 1.5 billion streams.

== Chart history ==
Key
†	Indicates best-performing single of 2018

Issue date	Song	Artist(s)	Weekly streams
January 3	"Perfect"	Ed Sheeran featuring Beyoncé	43.4 million
January 6	"Rockstar"	Post Malone featuring 21 Savage	37.7 million
January 13	"Rockstar"	Post Malone featuring 21 Savage	39.4 million
January 20	"Finesse"	Bruno Mars featuring Cardi B	38.3 million
January 27	"Havana"	Camila Cabello featuring Young Thug	44.9 million
February 3	"God's Plan" †	Drake	82.4 million
February 10	"God's Plan" †	Drake	83.3 million
February 17	"God's Plan" †	Drake	79.6 million
February 24	"God's Plan" †	Drake	75.5 million
March 3	"God's Plan" †	Drake	101.7 million
March 10	"God's Plan" †	Drake	92.8 million
March 17	"God's Plan" †	Drake	81.8 million
March 24	"God's Plan" †	Drake	72.9 million
March 31	"God's Plan" †	Drake	68.5 million
April 7	"God's Plan" †	Drake	61.1 million
April 14	"God's Plan" †	Drake	52.1 million
April 21	"Nice for What"	Drake	60.4 million
April 28	"Nice for What"	Drake	59.3 million
May 5	"Nice for What"	Drake	53.6 million
May 12	"Nice for What"	Drake	48.5 million
May 19	"This Is America"	Childish Gambino	65.3 million
May 26	"This Is America"	Childish Gambino	69.6 million
June 2	"This Is America"	Childish Gambino	45.2 million
June 9	"Yes Indeed"	Lil Baby and Drake	37.6 million
June 16	"All Mine"	Kanye West	36.3 million
June 23	"Lucid Dreams"	Juice WRLD	38.8 million
June 30	"Sad!"	XXXTentacion	48.9 million
July 7	"Sad!"	XXXTentacion	47.5 million
July 14	"Nonstop"	Drake	58.6 million
July 21	"In My Feelings"	Drake	71.7 million
July 28	"In My Feelings"	Drake	116.2 million
August 4	"In My Feelings"	Drake	106.2 million
August 11	"In My Feelings"	Drake	95.4 million
August 18	"In My Feelings"	Drake	92.7 million
August 25	"In My Feelings"	Drake	71 million
September 1	"In My Feelings"	Drake	59.4 million
September 8	"In My Feelings"	Drake	50.5 million
September 15	"Lucky You"	Eminem featuring Joyner Lucas	42.2 million
September 22	"I Love It"	Kanye West and Lil Pump	46.6 million
September 29	"I Love It"	Kanye West and Lil Pump	44.8 million
October 6	"Lucid Dreams"	Juice WRLD	41.6 million
October 13	"Mona Lisa"	Lil Wayne featuring Kendrick Lamar	43 million
October 20	"Drip Too Hard"	Lil Baby and Gunna	41.3 million
October 27	"Zeze"	Kodak Black featuring Travis Scott and Offset	47.6 million
November 3	"Zeze"	Kodak Black featuring Travis Scott and Offset	42.2 million
November 10	"Zeze"	Kodak Black featuring Travis Scott and Offset	39.5 million
November 17	"Thank U, Next"	Ariana Grande	55.5 million
November 24	"Thank U, Next"	Ariana Grande	63.4 million
December 1	"Thank U, Next"	Ariana Grande	43.8 million
December 8	"Thank U, Next"	Ariana Grande	42.5 million
December 15	"Thank U, Next"	Ariana Grande	93.8 million
December 22	"Thank U, Next"	Ariana Grande	50.7 million
December 29	"Thank U, Next"	Ariana Grande	43.5 million

== See also ==
- 2018 in American music
- List of Billboard Hot 100 number-one singles of 2018
