= Ekstasis =

Ékstasis (ἔκστασις) is the Ancient Greek word for ecstasy. Ekstasis or Éxtasis may also refer to:

- Éxtasis (film), a 1996 Spanish drama film
- Ekstasis (Nicky Skopelitis album), a 1993 jazz fusion album
- Ekstasis (Julia Holter album), a 2012 art pop album
- Éxtasis (song), a 2013 pop single by Pablo Alborán from the album Tanto
- Ekstasis Magazine, a Canadian-American publication about Christian arts and media
