= Suicidal Idol =

American singer

- Also known as: gore.x.shawty; Heartfelt
- Born: Alupe Tolentino; 2003 or 2004 (age 21–22); Los Angeles, California
- Genres: Electronic
- Occupation: Singer
- Instrument: Vocals
- Years active: 2021–present
- Label: Kurate Music

Alupe Tolentino, known professionally as Suicidal Idol (stylized as SUICIDAL-IDOL), is an American musician from Los Angeles. Initially presenting a hyperpop sound, she (Note: Tolentino uses she/her and they/them pronouns. This article uses she/her for consistency.) began releasing music in 2021; "Ecstacy" unexpectedly went viral on TikTok in 2023 and appeared in the top 40 of the UK Singles Chart. She later co-headlined a North American tour with Sueco. On Idol's musical style, sources mostly described it as EDM, with "Ecstacy" combining lo-fi and club/dance elements.

== Career and musical style ==
Originally from Los Angeles, California, she initially presented an emo pop sound and became popular by her pop rap songs. In 2021, she released songs under the names Heartfelt and gorexshawty. In July 2021, she independently released her first single, "Ecstacy". In February 2022, it was re-released through Kurate Music. The song went viral on TikTok starting in July 2023, largely due to a slowed-down version of the song becoming popular on the platform. On September 27, 2023, a remix with, 6arelyhuman & Syris, was released. It peaked at number 26 on the UK Singles Chart in October 2023, and charted at number 3 on Billboard's TikTok Billboard Top 50 with 3.6 million official streams earned in the U.S. By November, the song had been used in more than 195 thousand videos on the platform. Following the song's newfound virality following a trend featuring the song, "Sticking Out Your Tongue For The Picture". The parody remix following the aforementioned trend, with noticeably absurd lyrics was uploaded on TikTok, in early October 2023 and also went viral. Suicidal Idol performed as an opening act for Snow Strippers in October 2024 and for Sueco on dates of his Attempted Lover Tour in late 2024.

== Tours ==
- Attempted Lover Tour (with Sueco)

== Discography ==
=== Singles ===
List of singles as lead artist, with title, year released, album, and chart positions shown
Title	Year	Peak chart positions									Certifications	Album
Title	Year	AUT	CAN	CH	GER	IRE	SWE	UK	US Bub.	US Dance/Elec.	Certifications	Album
"Ecstacy"	2022	17	51	42	26	36	42	26	1	3	RIAA: Gold; BPI: Silver	Non-album singles
"In My Life" (featuring Sylene XO)	2022	–	–	–	–	–	–	–	–	–		Non-album singles
"She Wnna" (featuring Kaneda7)	2022	–	–	–	–	–	–	–	–	–		Non-album singles
"Right Next 2 U" (featuring Hoshie Star)	2022	–	–	–	–	–	–	–	–	–		Non-album singles
"OMG" (featuring 6arelyhuman)	2022	–	–	–	–	–	–	–	–	–		Non-album singles
"Promantic" (featuring Ronin and Pröz)	2022	–	–	–	–	–	–	–	–	–		Non-album singles
"Try Me" (featuring Techna)	2022	–	–	–	–	–	–	–	–	–		Non-album singles
"2006" (featuring Angelmane)	2023	–	–	–	–	–	–	–	–	–		Non-album singles
"Sceneteen" (featuring Rylorie)	2023	–	–	–	–	–	–	–	–	–		Non-album singles
"Higher" (with Syris and Pixel Hood)	2023	–	–	–	–	–	–	–	–	–		Non-album singles
"Stage" (with D3R and Pixel Hood)	2023	–	–	–	–	–	–	–	–	–		Non-album singles
"Break It Down" (with Alleycat and SkypeBF)	2023	–	–	–	–	–	–	–	–	–		Non-album singles
"Spending Cash" (with SkypeBF and Pröz)	2023	–	–	–	–	–	–	–	–	–		Non-album singles
"Fab in the Club" (featuring Syris and 6arelyhuman)	2023	–	–	–	–	–	–	–	–	–		Non-album singles
"High Life" (with Hubithekid and FabFantasy)	2024	–	–	–	–	–	–	–	–	–		Non-album singles
"She With Me" (with SkypeBF and PearlBlade)	2024	–	–	–	–	–	–	–	–	–		Non-album singles
"Into U" (with Pröz and FabFantasy)	2024	–	–	–	–	–	–	–	–	–		Non-album singles
"Tell Me That U Love Me" (with Pröz)	2024	–	–	–	–	–	–	–	–	–		Non-album singles
"Over" (with Syris and SkypeBF)	2024	–	–	–	–	–	–	–	–	–		Non-album singles
"MVP" (with Hubithekid and Pröz)	2024	–	–	–	–	–	–	–	–	–		Non-album singles
