= Ecstacy (song) =

Single by Suicidal Idol
- Released: February 18, 2022
- Genre: EDM; lo-fi
- Length: 1:36
- Label: Kurate
- Songwriter: Suicidal Idol
- Producer: Buhguul

Suicidal Idol singles chronology
"Ecstacy" (2022)	"She Wnna" (2021)

Audio sample
- Suicidal-Idol – "ecstacy": file; help

Music video
- "Ecstasy" on YouTube

"Ecstacy" (stylized in all lowercase) is the debut single by American singer Suicidal Idol. It was originally released in July 2021 and later re-released on February 18, 2022. The song is a lo-fi EDM song that includes lyrics about romantic desire and has trap influences. In 2023, a slowed-down version and a parody of the song both went viral on TikTok and it peaked at number 26 on the UK Singles Chart.

== Background and composition ==
"Ecstacy" had been teased online by singer Suicidal-Idol in the months leading up to its release. It was initially released independently in July 2021, and later released to streaming platforms on February 18, 2022, through Kurate Music as Suicidal-Idol's debut single. Written and produced by Suicidal Idol and Buhguul, "Ecstacy" has distorted drums, processed vocals, synths, trap-inspired hi-hats, a four on the floor beat, and "dark" lyrics about an unhealthy romantic longing.

== Virality and reception ==
"Ecstacy" first went viral on TikTok starting in July 2023, with its lyric "Sticking out your tongue for the picture" going viral on the platform in October 2023. A slowed-down version of the song had been used in more than 267 thousand videos on the platform by December of that year, while two separate sounds using the song's original version had also been used in more than 40.7 thousand videos and 92.3 thousand videos, respectively, by that point. Videos using the song were largely emo- and goth-styled, while others gave instructions on how to mew. A parody of the song with nonsensical lyrics, featuring slang terms popular among Generation Alpha such as gyatt, rizzler, skibidi, Fanum tax, and sigma, was uploaded by TikTok user @homestucklover398 in early October 2023. It soon went viral, with more than 195 thousand videos on the platform featuring the song by mid-October. Following its virality online, "Ecstacy" peaked at number 26 on the UK Singles Chart in October 2023.

== Credits and personnel ==
Credits from Tidal and Apple Music.

- Suicidal Idol – writer, performer
- Buhguul – producer

== Charts ==
=== Weekly charts ===
Weekly chart performance for "Ecstacy"
Chart (2023)	Peak position
Austria (Ö3 Austria Top 40)	17
Canada (Canadian Hot 100)	51
Germany (GfK)	26
Ireland (IRMA)	36
Sweden (Sverigetopplistan)	71
Switzerland (Schweizer Hitparade)	42
UK Singles (Official Charts)	26
UK Dance (Official Charts)	15
UK Indie (Official Charts)	8
US Bubbling Under Hot 100 (Billboard)	1
US Hot Dance/Electronic Songs (Billboard)	3

=== Year-end charts ===
2023 year-end chart performance for "Ecstacy"
Chart (2023)	Position
US Hot Dance/Electronic Songs (Billboard)	34

2024 year-end chart performance for "Ecstacy"
Chart (2024)	Position
US Hot Dance/Electronic Songs (Billboard)	21

== Certifications and sales ==
Region	Certification	Certified units/sales
New Zealand (RMNZ)	Gold	15,000^{‡}
United Kingdom (BPI)	Silver	200,000^{‡}
United States (RIAA)	Platinum	1,000,000^{‡}
^{‡} Sales+streaming figures based on certification alone.
