= XTCY =

2018 single by Kanye West

Single by Kanye West
- Released: August 30, 2018 (Note: "XTCY" was initially shared as a free song on August 11, 2018. It was released as an official single on August 30, 2018.)
- Recorded: May–August 2018
- Genre: Experimental hip-hop; dirty rap
- Length: 2:56
- Label: GOOD; Def Jam
- Songwriters: Kanye West; Andrew Dawson; David Payton
- Producers: Kanye West; Andrew Dawson

Kanye West singles chronology
"All Mine" (2018)	"XTCY" (2018)	"I Love It" (2018)

Original cover
- Original WeTransfer cover

"XTCY" (pronounced "ecstasy") is a song by American rapper Kanye West. It was originally posted on Twitter by DJ Clark Kent on August 11, 2018, as a free download from file sharing service WeTransfer. It was later released on streaming as a single on August 30, 2018. Written and produced by West and Andrew Dawson, it has additional writing credits for David Payton due to the sampling of the song "My Bleeding Wound" by the New Year.

West's first solo release since his eighth studio album, Ye, West raps about sexual fantasies with his then sisters-in-law, which he thinks of on the spot as a result of abusing the drug ecstasy. It received generally negative reviews from music critics, who criticized the track for its lyrics. They often compared its production, songwriting quality, and vocal delivery to that of an unfinished demo.

== Background ==
On May 15, 2018, West posted an image of an unfinished track listing for his then-upcoming album Ye. which featured the alternate title "Extacy" as the second track. This version of the song was not included on Ye's tracklist when it released. "XTCY" was later reused on a June 1, 2018 track listing for Kids See Ghosts' self-titled album as an unnumbered track. Kids See Ghosts was also released without the track.

=== Artwork ===
The original artwork for "XTCY" is a photo from Kylie Jenner's 21st birthday party, taken at the Los Angeles nightclub Delilah. The artwork features West's then wife, Kim Kardashian, as well as sisters-in-law Khloé Kardashian, Kylie Jenner, Kendall Jenner and Kourtney Kardashian; the last four are the subject of the song. Kim Kardashian's dress was designed by West's fashion brand Yeezy.

The cover art for the song's official single release was painted by London-based artist Shadi Al-Atallah. To her shock, West's creative team had taken an interest in her work, emailing her to request a commission; Al-Atallah initially believed this was a scam due to West's high profile and her lack of industry connections. She created the artwork in one day, to which it was subsequently used as the cover for "XTCY". She would collaborate with West once more, designing the cover art for his next single, "I Love It".

== Composition ==
"XTCY" is a minimalist, experimental hip-hop song with overtly sexual themes. West has rapped at length about his sex life in the past, such as on the songs "I'm In It" (2013) and "All Mine" (2018). The songs echoey guitar riffs, singing, and moaning sounds are sampled from the song "My Bleeding Wound" by the New Year. West opens the track with the lines “You got sick thoughts? I got more of ‘em / You got a sister-in-law you would smash? I got four of ‘em”. This sets up the rest of the tracks theming, as he uses pornographic lyrics to describe a variety of situations he could encounter with his sisters-in-laws. Near the end of the track, West references his scatting from his 2018 single "Lift Yourself" as ad-libs.

== Promotion and release ==
DJ Clark Kent
(@DJClarkKent)
tweeted:

Sitting in the studio with my man

@kanyewest

and he said.. "Clark, let that new "XTCY"joint go!!! So.. ENJOY: NEW KANYE WEST..

August 11, 2018

DJ Clark Kent posted the song to Twitter on August 11, 2018, via download link from WeTransfer. It was West's first release since his five Wyoming Sessions albums: Daytona, Ye, Kids See Ghosts, Nasir, and K.T.S.E. It was later re-released on August 30, 2018, as a single on streaming services.

== Critical reception ==
"XTCY" received generally negative reviews from music critics. Katherine Cusumano of W Magazine wrote that the song felt more like a demo track than an actually completed work, though she noted that West is "no stranger to reworking his material in the public eye." She adds that West is as self-aware as ever, "referencing the recent responses to West’s pro-Trump remarks, [...] the critics who have proposed that the rapper might be mentally ill," but he fails to be self-aware regarding the songs actual content. Esquire's Matt Miller called "XTCY" an "objectively unpleasant" song, suggesting that listeners would "want to make sure [their] stomach is prepared" before listening. He cited the lyrics "If she suck seed, that's a success / If a girl cum, that's a fuck fest / And we gon' score 100 on this drug test" as an example of "all this nasty shit he's describing (while on ecstasy)". Writing for Vice, Shaad D'Souza expressed that the song had not changed much since its August 11 "leak", and was "still pretty bad." Andre Gee of Uproxx said that while "Kanye the producer was still his god-given, self-developed genius," "XTCY" marked a significant downgrade in both his lyrics and the delivery of them, suggesting that West should take the "stick to the beats" advice he was given before his rap career.

== Commercial performance ==
After its release as a single, "XTCY" managed to reached number 32 on the New Zealand Hot Singles chart.

== Credits and personnel ==
Credits adapted from Tidal.

- Kanye West – performance, production
- Andrew Dawson – co-production, engineering
- Mike Dean – engineering, mixing
- Mike Malchicoff – engineering
- Zack Djurich – engineering
- Sean Solymar – assistant recording engineering
- Jess Jackson – mixing

== Charts ==
Chart (2018)	Peak position
New Zealand Hot Singles (RMNZ)	32

== Release history ==
Region	Date	Format	Label	Ref.
Various	August 30, 2018	Digital download	GOOD; Def Jam	
