= Bump J =

American rapper

- Born: Terrance Michael Boykin; September 15, 1979 (age 47); Chicago, Illinois, U.S.
- Genres: Midwestern hip-hop; gangsta rap
- Occupations: Rapper; songwriter
- Labels: Atlantic; Goon Squad

Terrance Michael Boykin (born September 15, 1979), better known by his stage name Bump J, is an American rapper from Chicago, Illinois. He is best known for his guest appearance alongside Lil Durk on Kanye West and Ty Dolla Sign's 2023 single "Vultures", which peaked within the top 40 of the Billboard Hot 100.

Prior, he signed an unsuccessful recording contract with Atlantic Records to release his 2005 West-produced single "Move Around", for which he gained minor recognition. He was incarcerated from 2008 to 2017, and resumed his recording career thereafter to work with predominantly Chicago-based artists. He is credited as a co-writer on West's 2018 song "I Thought About Killing You".

== Career ==
Boykin signed a US$3 million recording contract with Atlantic Records in 2004. In 2005, he released his debut single "Move Around", which received radio play and was used in Madden NFL 06, the television series Entourage (on Season 2, Episode 7), and a McDonald's commercial. Working extensively with fellow Chicago native Kanye West, he was scheduled to release his debut studio album Nothing to Lose the following year, but parted ways with Atlantic by 2007, leaving its release in question.

In November 2008, he was arrested and charged for an armed bank robbery committed in January of the prior year. After accepting a plea deal and serving seven years of a ten year prison sentence, he was released on April 12, 2017. In 2018, he released the mixtapes I Don't Feel Rehabilitated and 606 God. Boykin also collaborated with Ty Money and Chicago rapper G Herbo on his debut album Humble Beast (2018). Alongside Lil Durk, he guest featured on the single "Vultures", the lead single from ¥$'s (Kanye West and Ty Dolla Sign) collaborative album Vultures 1, released in November 2023.

== Personal life ==
In 2020, he was managed by SAL&CO.
