= Christopher Hooton =

Christopher Hooton is a journalist, podcaster and filmmaker from London, England.

== Life and career ==
Hooton started his career in journalism at Metro, before moving to The Independent where he served as the publication's culture editor and later film & TV critic-at-large. Here, he interviewed Martin Scorsese, Matthew McConaughey, Joaquin Phoenix and other notable figures in the film industry. In 2017, he founded the film interview podcast, Kernels, which was named Best Media Podcast 2017 by The Drum. In April 2019, Hooton co-created Coffee & Flowers, a documentary podcast made with and about Ohio rock band The National, its first season going to No.1 in the Apple Podcasts music charts in 11 countries including the US, UK and Canada.

He made his directorial debut with feature film Meniscus in 2018, before writing and directing a short for Channel 4 and Vero entitled False Indigo a year later, which stars Morgane Polanski and Jack Brett Anderson, and was executive produced by Steve Bendelack.
