= Drake–Kanye West feud =

Hip-hop feud

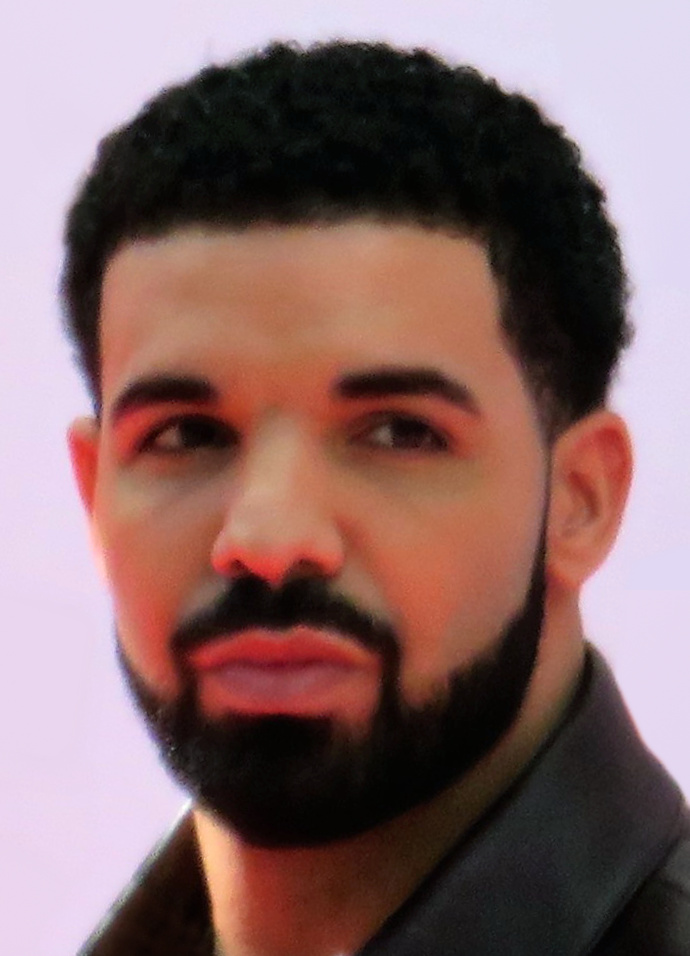
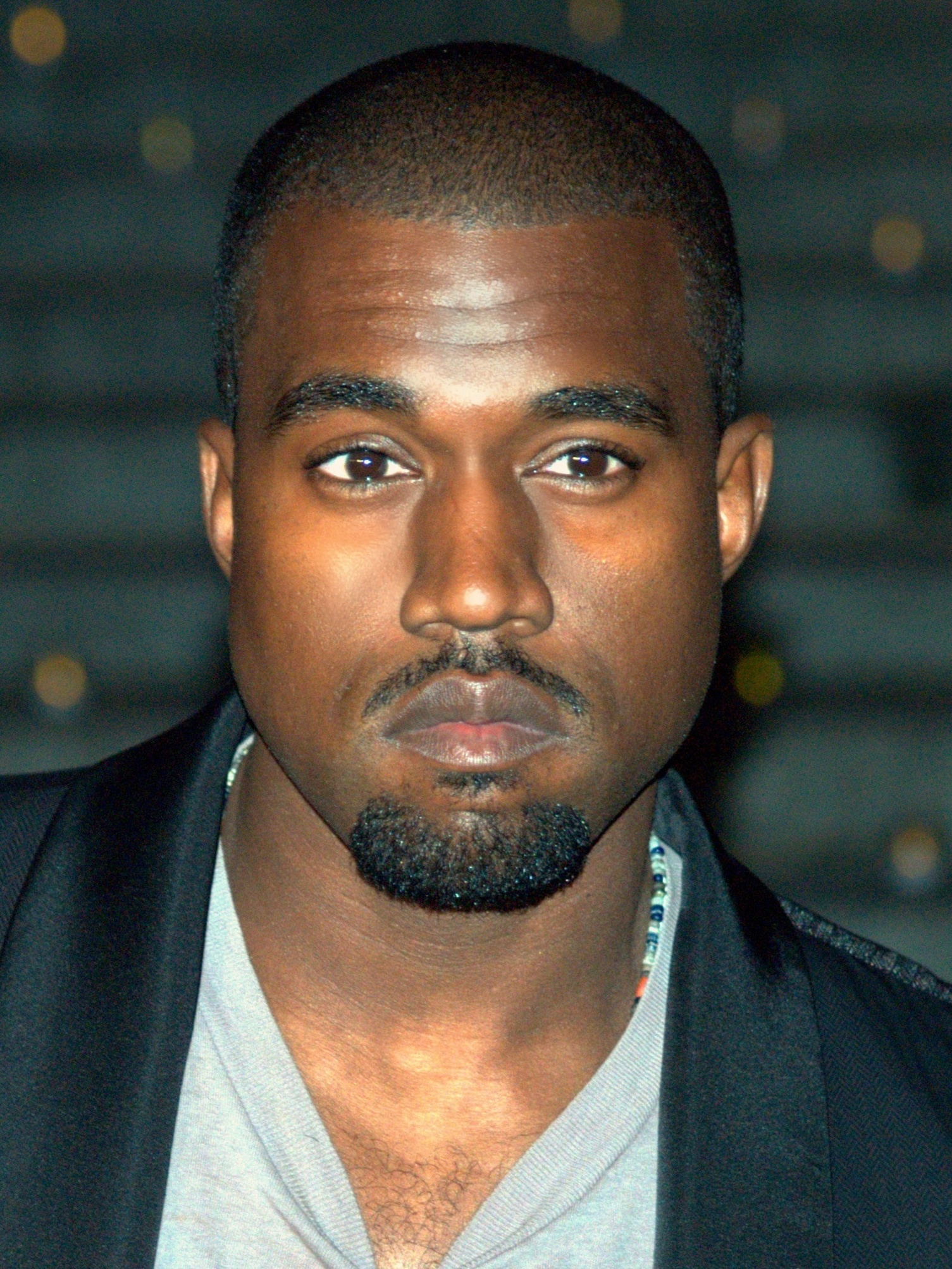
- Drake in 2017 Kanye West in 2009
- Date: September 13, 2009 – present (17 years, 2 months and 4 days)
- Medium: Diss tracks, social media
- Status: Ongoing

Parties
Drake; 21 Savage	Kanye West; Kim Kardashian; Pusha T; Meek Mill; Future; Metro Boomin

Works
"Duppy Freestyle"; "Sicko Mode"; "7AM on Bridle Path"; "Circo Loco"; "Search and Rescue"; "Red Button"; "Family Matters"	"Lift Yourself"; "No Mistakes"; "Facts (Charlie Heat Version)"; "Life of the Party"; "Like That Remix"

Canadian rapper Drake and American rapper Kanye West have been involved in an on-and-off feud stemming from 2009. The conflict has unfolded over several years and has involved public statements, social media exchanges, and musical releases.

== 2009–2017: Background ==
Drake and West had a fair share of interactions before their disputes. West directed the music video for "Best I Ever Had," Drake's 2009 debut single. West also featured in Drake's 2009 single "Forever" alongside Eminem and Lil Wayne. Furthermore, West also wrote for and produced Drake's 2010 single "Find Your Love," alongside Jeff Bhasker, No I.D. and Drake himself. During an interview with The Source, Drake revealed he wanted to be better than West and surpass him one day. In May 2011, Drake rapped in the song "I'm on One": "I'm just feeling like the throne is for the taking (watch me take it)", referencing Kanye's joint album with Jay-Z, Watch the Throne that dropped in August 2011. In 2012, Drake and West were neighbors in Hidden Hills, California. After this however, Drake and West would still be on good terms at least until 2018, as both of them featured in Big Sean's "Blessings" in 2015, and West would have features on Drake's "Pop Style" along with Jay-Z and also on "Glow" in 2016 and 2017 respectively and also produce tracks from Drake's 2016 album Views with Drake also having writing credits on tracks from West's The Life of Pablo the same year. On a promotional single for that album, West appeared to diss Drake on the song "Facts," saying "Yeezy, Yeezy, Yeezy just jumped over Jumpman," copying the cadence used on Drake's song, "Jumpman," a hit single on Drake and Future's collaborative 2015 mixtape What a Time to Be Alive. In the same song, West derided Nike, whose sub-label, Jordan Brand, had been collaborating with Drake since 2013. On August 1, 2016, West joined Drake on stage at Drake's annual OVO Fest festival and the two artists hinted at a potential joint album being in the works. Later that month, a billboard was posted in Los Angeles with West and Drake's record labels, G.O.O.D. Music and OVO Sound's respective logos, with text reading "Calabasas is the new Abu Dhabi", referencing their residential neighborhood, further teasing the album. However, the album was likely scrapped due to West voicing disdain over local radio stations continued broadcast of DJ Khaled's "For Free" single, which heavily featured Drake.

== 2018: Escalation ==
=== Pusha T–Drake feud, West involvement ===
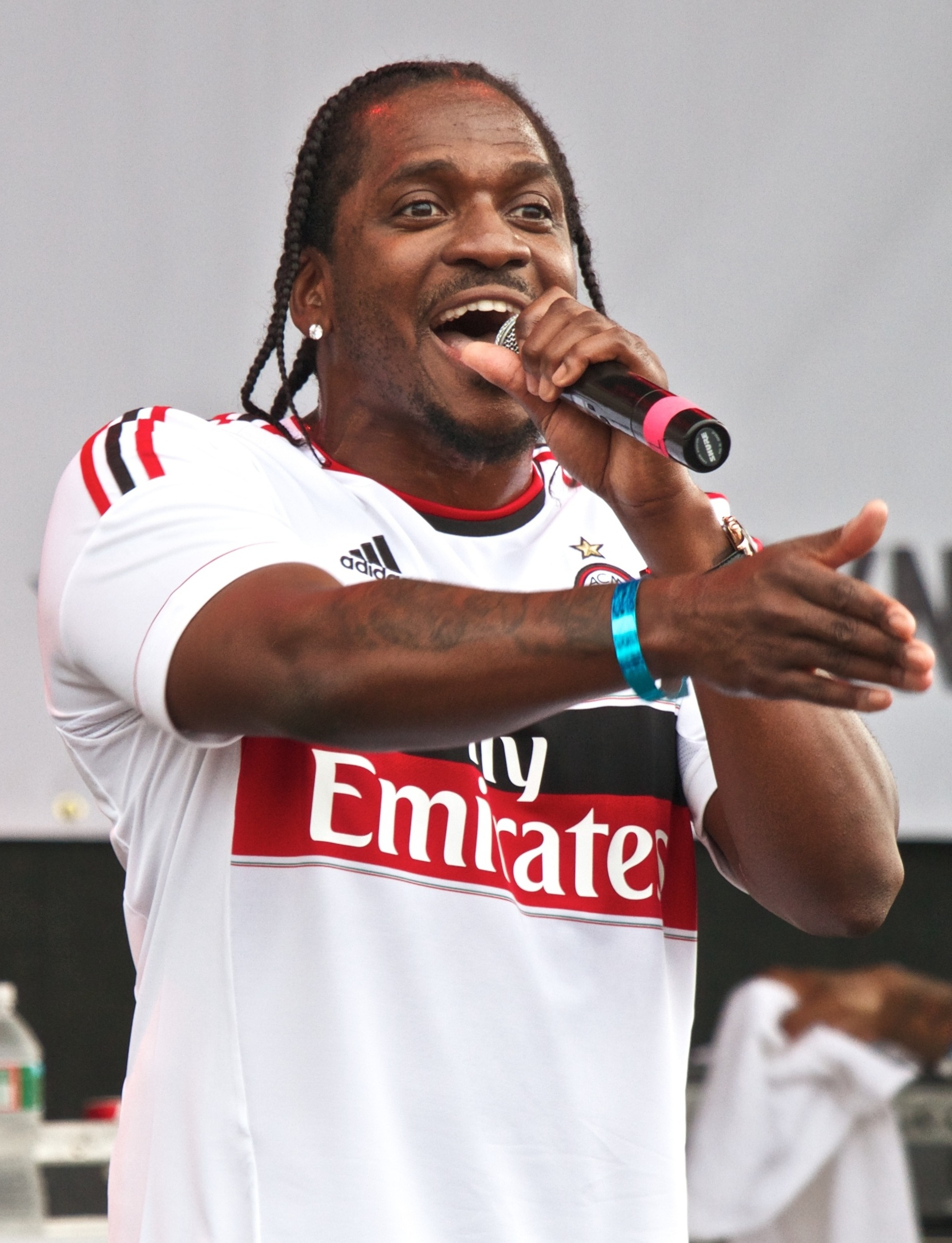
Pusha T performing in 2013

Drake and rapper Pusha T have been on bad terms since 2011. Tensions rose between the two after Pusha T released his album Daytona, which was produced by West. On the album's last track, "Infrared", Pusha T questioned Drake's lyrical abilities, suggesting that Quentin Miller had been writing for Drake behind the scenes. Drake responded to Pusha T with "Duppy Freestyle". On the track, he calls West a "leech and serpent" for resenting his former collaborator Virgil Abloh, as he left West's company Yeezy to become the creative director of Louis Vuitton. He also questioned the extravagance of Pusha-T and his brother Malice's drug dealing background. Drake ended the song by denying the ghostwriting allegations brought up by Meek Mill in their 2015 rap feud, and name dropping the wife of Pusha T.

Four days after the release of "Duppy Freestyle", Pusha T released "The Story of Adidon" over the instrumental to Jay-Z's "The Story of O.J.", mocking Drake's alleged insecurities about his race, the relationship between Drake's mother and father, Drake's longtime producer Noah "40" Shebib having multiple sclerosis, and revealing that Drake has a son with French model and former porn star Sophie Brussaux. Pusha T also revealed the scrapped Adidas collaboration with Drake titled "Adidon" was named after Drake's son, Adonis. Two days after, West released "No Mistakes" from his studio album Ye, perceived as a diss to Drake. Drake recorded a response to "The Story of Adidon", but his mentor James Prince talked him out of releasing it. Prince said the track could have devastated West's career and harmed families, which he felt would be out of character for Drake.

Drake appeared on the second episode of LeBron James' HBO show The Shop and implied that West scheduled the releases of Ye, Daytona, and other albums to interfere with the release of Scorpion and seemed to believe that West told Pusha T about his son. Later, however, Pusha T came forward and claimed Drake's producer Noah "40" Shebib was the one who revealed his disgruntled musings to a woman and the fact that the rapper has a child. The woman further divulged the information. West also apologized to Drake for dropping the albums around the same time as Scorpion claiming he had a lot going on at the time. He also denied telling Pusha T about his son.

=== "Lift Yourself" beat ===
Drake revealed during his appearance on The Shop that he was briefly invited to West's Wyoming sessions for the album that would become Ye, but instead of leaving with a collaboration, Drake revealed he loved the "Lift Yourself" beat. Drake also revealed later that he and West both had an agreement for Drake to buy the beat for $3,000,000. But instead of selling the beat, West kept it for himself and used phrases based around the words poop, scoop, and whoop. West's verse includes him saying, "Whoop-diddy-scoop / Whoop-diddy-scoop-poop", and the song abruptly ends after the verse.

In September 2018, West admitted Drake had some ill feelings towards him because he used the beat for "Lift Yourself" that Drake originally wanted. West stated that he should have given Drake an opportunity before releasing the final version and also apologized to him over their falling out, which was led to by West's usage of the beat and his role in Pusha T's feud with Drake.

=== "Sicko Mode" ===
Between December 13 and 14, 2018, West sent out a series of tweets where he called out Drake for what he labeled "sneak disses" on Travis Scott's "Sicko Mode". He followed up and urged Scott to apologize. West alleged that Drake threatened his life and the safety of his family. The following day his then-wife Kim Kardashian defended West and told Drake to stop threatening her family.

== 2021: Social media and album conflicts ==
On August 23, 2021, Drake reignited their feud by dissing West on the Trippie Redd song "Betrayal". Later on that day, West shared what seemed to be Drake's Toronto address in an Instagram post he eventually deleted. Drake referenced the address leak on the Certified Lover Boy track "7AM on Bridle Path". Drake leaked the Donda outtake "Life of the Party" featuring André 3000 during the Certified Lover Boy guest DJ mix on Sirius XM on September 4, 2021, where West originally dissed Drake by name. The released version of the track had a different verse, which rapper Tyler, the Creator, confessed to hearing before the outtake was leaked.

West and Drake released the albums Donda and Certified Lover Boy five days apart. While both albums received mixed reviews, Donda was released by West first on August 29, 2021, was the more better received album and debuted at No. 1 on the US Billboard 200 selling 309,000 units in its first week. This was surpassed by Drake's Certified Lover Boy that released on September 3, 2021, was the more commercially successful and sold 613,000 units in its first week as well as replacing Donda as No. 1 as it dropped to second.

On November 8, West uploaded a video to his Instagram of him standing next to former Rap-A-Lot Records co-founder J Prince, reading a written apology to Drake in hopes for the two to put the feud aside for a benefit concert for incarcerated reformed gangster Larry Hoover, during West's ongoing effort and call for his release. Days later, West uploaded a picture of him, Drake and J Prince, together outside of Drake's house, confirming the beef was squashed. The Free Larry Hoover Benefit Concert was announced to take place on December 9, and was held at the Los Angeles Memorial Coliseum. The two rappers were joined by West's choir, the Sunday Service Choir and was attended by 70,000 fans. The concert was livestreamed via Amazon Prime Video and Twitch, and was broadcast in IMAX theaters.

== 2022–present: Further exchanges ==
On November 4, 2022, Drake released "Circo Loco" on his collaborative album Her Loss with 21 Savage. On the song, Drake raps "linking with the opps, bitch, I did that shit for J Prince/Bitch, I did it for the mob ties", referencing back to the Free Larry Hoover Benefit Concert. West would respond to the lyric with a Tweet.

ye
(@kanyewest)
tweeted:

Enough already

I done gave this man his flowers multiple times Let's really see who are real ops are in this music Imagine all the rappers on the game

same side and everyone cleaning up each others contracts It's kingdom time Love Drake #lovespeech

November 4, 2022

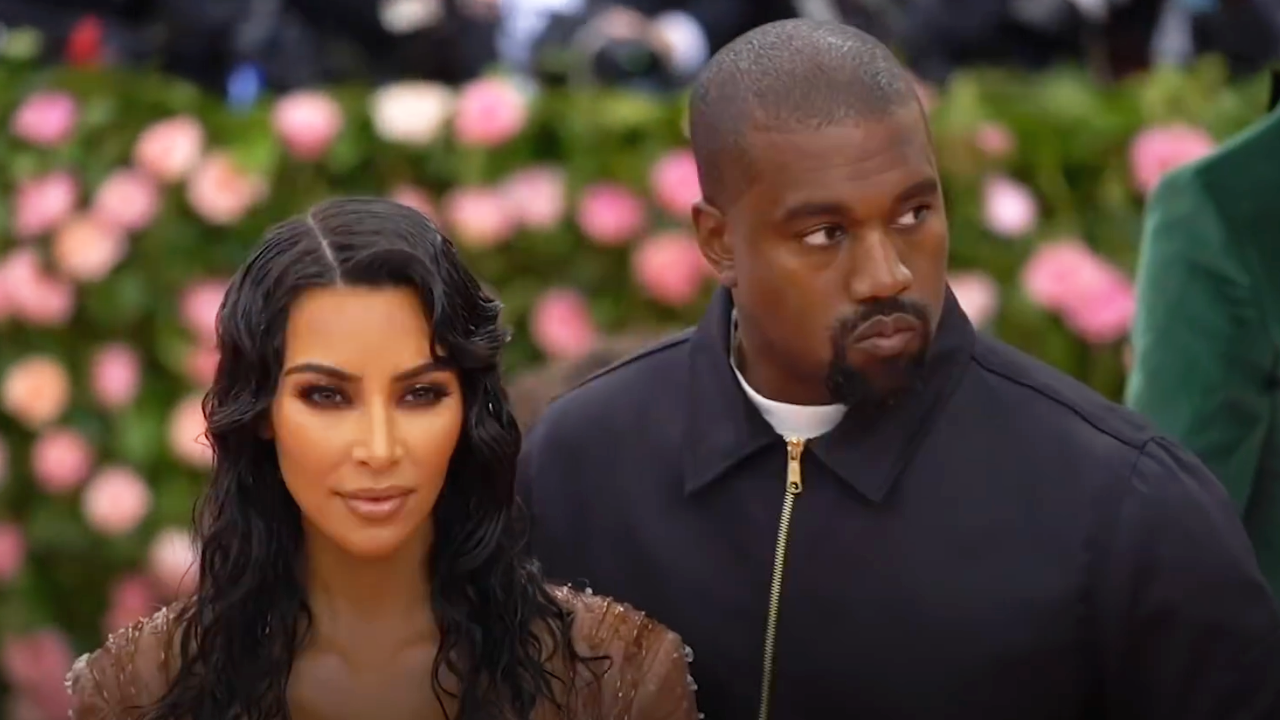
West with his then-wife Kim Kardashian at the 2019 Met Gala.

On April 7, 2023, Drake released "Search and Rescue" where Drake used an excerpt of a conversation between West's ex-wife Kim Kardashian and her mother Kris Jenner about Kim's divorce from West: "I didn't come this far, just to come this far and not be happy", Kardashian told her mother in a clip from an episode of their reality show Keeping Up with the Kardashians.

On November 17, 2023, Drake released "Red Button" as part of For All the Dogs Scary Hours Edition. Drake called out West for being false when apologizing about their recurring conflict.

On April 19, 2024, West previewed a remix of "Like That", which took aim at Drake and J. Cole, amidst the former's feud with Kendrick Lamar.

On April 6, 2025, West would preview his then-upcoming single "Heil Hitler" on a livestream with record producer Digital Nas. The version played contained an unused line where West refers to Drake as a "faggot".

However, later exchanges from Kanye in interviews appear to be more positive towards Drake. Regarding the Superbowl event, he remarked regarding Drake's standing within hip-hop during an interview with Akademiks, describing Drake as "a million times better" and "a million times more important" than Kendrick Lamar despite acknowledging a complicated personal relationship between the two artists. In another exchange, he questioned Kendrick Lamar's selection as a Super Bowl halftime performer, asking, "Why do they want somebody with no hits like Kendrick to do the Super Bowl?"

On October 31, 2026, Drake was spotted attending West's concert at Reliant Stadium in Houston, alongside Travis Scott, according to fan-shot footage. Drake and Scott were reportedly wearing the same clothes they had been photographed in at a Houston Rockets game earlier that evening. Producer Mike Dean was also in attendance near both Drake and Scott.

== See also ==
- Taylor Swift–Kanye West feud
