= Search and rescue (disambiguation) =

Search and rescue is the search for and provision of aid to people who are in distress or imminent danger.

== Television ==
- Search and Rescue (1977 TV series), a Canadian-American television series
- "Search and Rescue!", a 1989 episode of The Raccoons
- Search and Rescue (Australian TV series), a 2008 Australian documentary series
- "Search and Rescue" (Stargate Atlantis), a 2008 episode of Stargate Atlantis

== Music ==
- "Search & Rescue" (song), a 2023 single by Drake
- Search/Rescue, a band formed by members of Gatsbys American Dream and Acceptance

== See also ==
- Search and rescue dog, a dog trained for search and rescue operations
- Search and rescue horse, a horse used as transportation of mounted searchers and rescuers
- Search and Rescue Optimal Planning System, a comprehensive search and rescue system
- RAF Search and Rescue Force, an RAF organisation providing round-the-clock search and rescue operations in the UK, Cyprus and the Falkland Islands
