= List of unreleased projects by Kanye West =

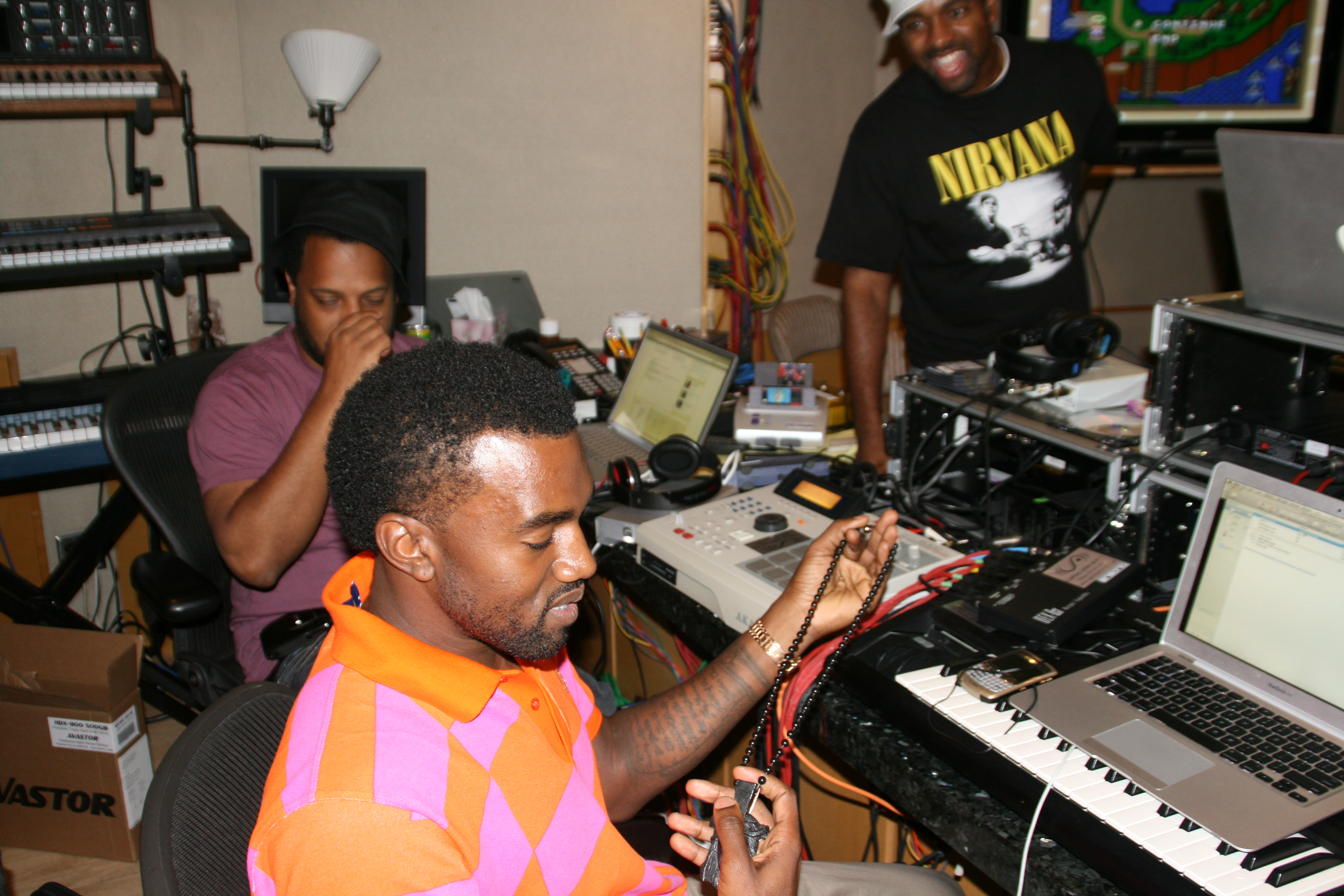
West working with No I.D. in the studio for 808s & Heartbreak, October 2008

The following is a list of unreleased Kanye West projects in rough chronological order. During his career, American rapper Kanye West has developed several projects which were never formally published. Some were officially canceled or scrapped, while others fell into development hell. The level of completion of these projects vary widely, with some never leaving pre-production and others being nearly finished.

== Music projects ==
=== World Record Holders ===
In 1996, West—alongside GLC, Timmy G, and Arrowstar—formed a Chicago rap group called the Go Getters. The group recorded a number of songs and made local radio appearances, but their debut album, World Record Holders, was never officially released. The album leaked online in 2010.

=== 1997 beat tape ===
A set of eight tracks, allegedly from an unreleased beat tape West produced in 1997, was uploaded to SoundCloud in May 2016. XXL found it to be plausible that the tape was authentic, and identified one of the beats as an early version of Infamous Syndicate's "What You Do to Me."

=== The College Dropout alternate version ===
West's original version of The College Dropout (2004) was leaked online months before release, and in response he made several changes to the album's instrumentation and mixing. The removed tracks include a song called "My Way," as well as early versions of the eventual Late Registration (2005) tracks "Hey Mama" and "Gold Digger," the former of which West described in a 2003 MTV News interview before The College Dropout's release, was made in 2000. Featured appearances from rappers Ol' Dirty Bastard and Consequence were also removed.

=== Good Ass Job ===
Original cover art for the single "Power", widely regarded as the cover art of Good Ass Job.

West initially intended to release his first four albums as a college-themed series, with Good Ass Job being the final album. Good Ass Job was foreshadowed in some of West's earlier songs; for instance, the track "Graduation Day" on The College Dropout alluded to the title with the lyric "She wants me to get a good ass job just like everybody." West also revealed this intention to MTV News in 2003, before The College Dropout's release. West adhered to this plan with Late Registration and Graduation, but after the death of his mother Donda West and his breakup with fiancée Alexis Phifer, he pivoted to an electropop project titled 808s & Heartbreak for his fourth album in 2008.

In a January 2009 interview with French magazine Elle, West changed the upcoming album's title to Winter-Spring-Summer-Fall, featuring 12 songs, with three songs for each season. That September, West received worldwide controversy and criticism for interrupting Taylor Swift during her acceptance of the award for Best Female Video during the 2009 MTV Video Music Awards, referring to "Single Ladies (Put a Ring on It)" as being "one of the best videos of all time." The incident was a turning point in the development of Good Ass Job, prompting West's decision to exile himself to Oahu, Hawaii.

Via Rap Radar in February 2010, incoming GOOD Music rapper Big Sean confirmed that the project was still under the title Good Ass Job; Billboard also corroborated the title that July. However, on October 5, 2010, West announced the title's change to My Beautiful Dark Twisted Fantasy, claiming it was always the title during the production. The same month, he confirmed to MTV News that he changed the concept because of his disdain with the skits and original ideas of Good Ass Job.

=== "RoboCop" music video ===
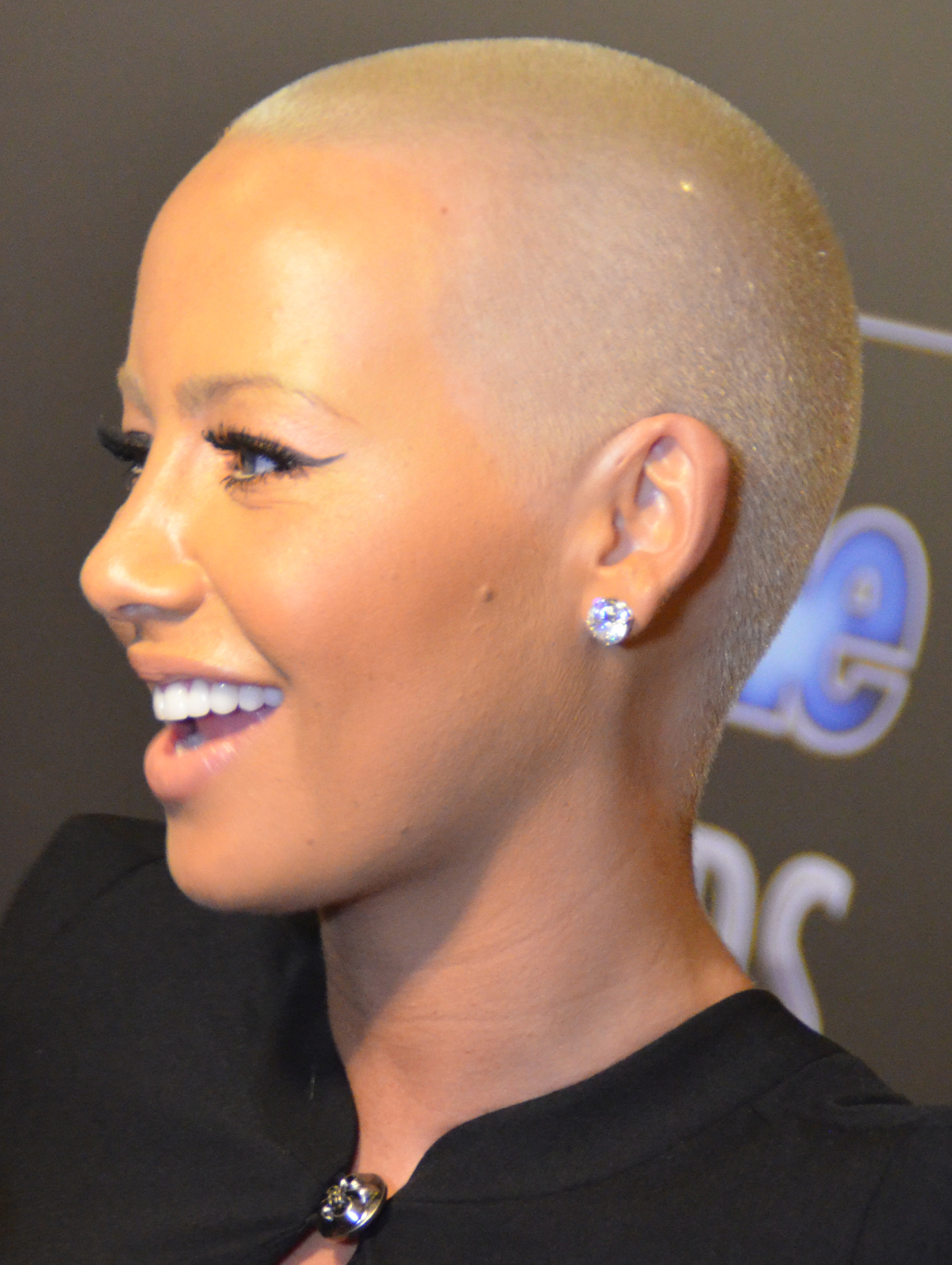
Amber Rose worked with West on a music video for the song in 2009.

On March 11, 2009, Clash reported that West was shooting a music video for the song with his then-girlfriend Amber Rose. It was recorded in Los Angeles after West had to persuade Rose to fly there for the shooting. Speaking to MTV News four months later, Rose said that she plays a robot throughout the video and appears alone for 95 percent of it. During an on-set interview, West expressed that the visual was inspired by his love for video games, characterizing making a video look equally good to a game as "the holy grail." He explained that rather than utilizing computer-generated imagery, the "intensity" should come off the screen.

The music video was directed by Hype Williams. Although the video did not experience an official release, Shihan Barbee shared a 13-second stop-motion clip from it to Instagram on August 8, 2014. Accompanying the clip, Barbee posted: "Wish he had released this video. Super dope." The clip has a pink technicolor backdrop, which West stands in front while wearing a tuxedo that accompanies his faux hawk and tucking his hands in his pockets. West stands face-to-face with a nude robot that has Rose's head digitally inserted onto it with the addition of sunglasses; she makes robotic movements simultaneously with him rapping. At certain points, West makes exaggerated faces to the camera.

The full version of the music video was leaked in October 2024.

=== Watch the Throne 2 ===
In December 2011, Jay-Z stated in an interview with MTV News that a sequel to Watch the Throne would be released after solo projects from Jay-Z and West. In May 2012, Watch the Throne co-producer Mike Dean stated in an interview that Watch the Throne 2 was being planned. Jay-Z reiterated in an August 2013 interview with Power 106 that a sequel to Watch the Throne was being planned.

On April 5, 2016, Drake released "Pop Style", featuring West and Jay-Z, as a single for Views. However, when the album released, West and Jay-Z's features were removed. West blamed the removed verses on exclusivity deals by Apple Music and Tidal. While performing in Seattle during the Saint Pablo Tour, West said that Watch the Throne 2 would not be released, blaming Jay-Z for removing West's verse from the song.

On September 8, 2018, West tweeted that Watch the Throne 2 was "coming soon." At the time, it was not clear if West and Jay-Z were in contact as West stated in a May 2018 interview that he had not been in contact with Jay-Z since the Saint Pablo Tour speech. It was reported in October 2018 that Jay-Z had severed ties with West over West's political rants in support of Donald Trump. In November 2018, Meek Mill released Championships, which features a Jay-Z guest appearance on "What's Free". Jay-Z references West on the song, rapping "No red hat, don't Michael and Prince me and Ye." Soon after the release, Jay-Z clarified on Twitter that the line was not a diss against West; West responded suggesting a Watch the Throne sequel.

In July 2021, West previewed the song "Jail", which featured Jay-Z, at a Donda listening party in Atlanta. The song sparked speculation that a Watch the Throne sequel was in development, with Jay-Z rapping: "This might be the return of The Throne." The following month, West affiliate Justin Laboy stated that Watch the Throne 2 was to release later that year. In an October 2022 Drink Champs interview, West again stated that Watch the Throne 2 was "coming soon." Earlier that year, Fivio Foreign revealed that Jay-Z was meant to record for "City of Gods", though this fell through due to West being "too impatient" to wait for Jay-Z to record, despite being adamant that he be featured.

=== Cruel Winter ===
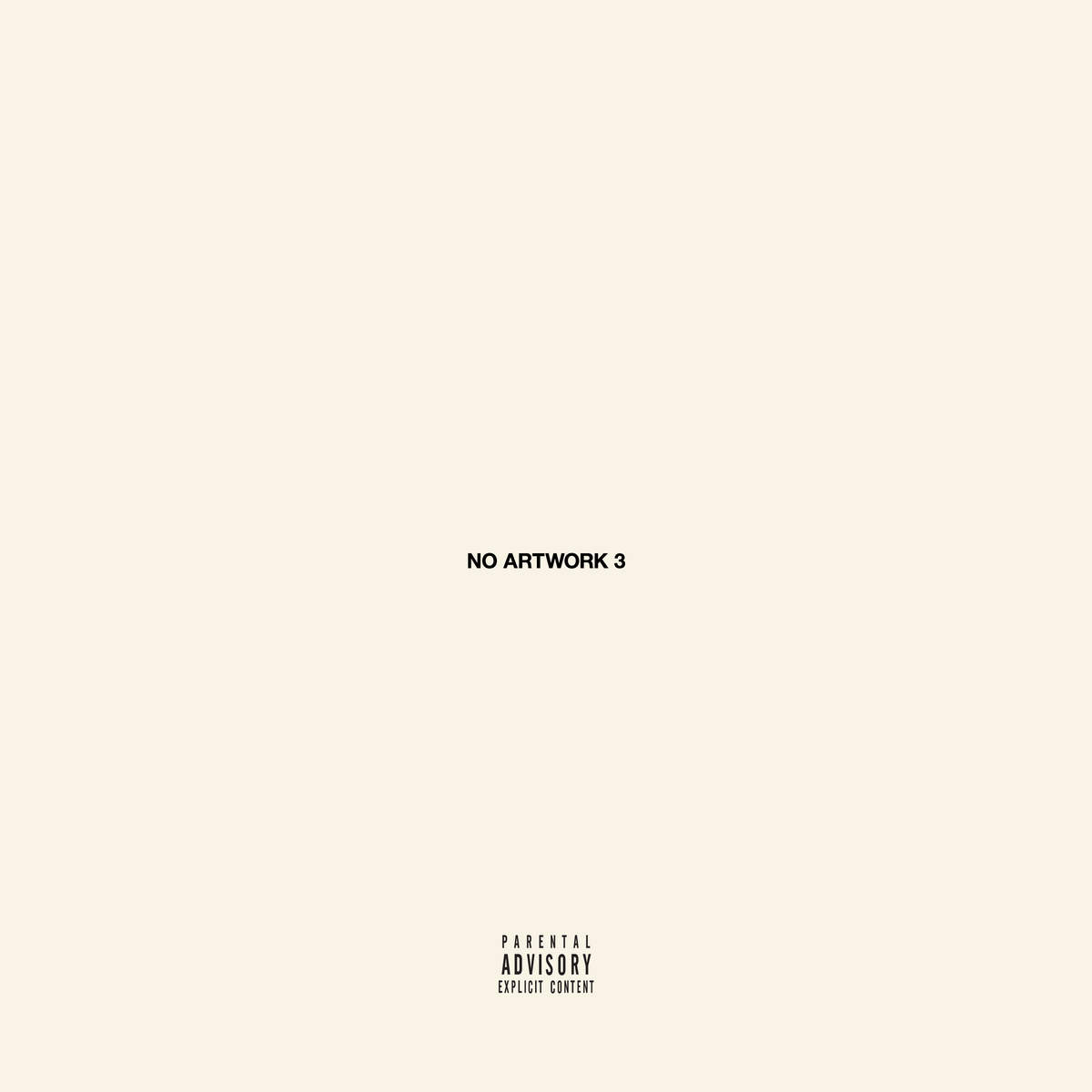
The cover art of "Champions", the intended lead single of Cruel Winter

In September 2012, American rapper Q-Tip was questioned about his lack of involvement on Cruel Summer and stated, "I know, I know, I'm sorry about that but I have to let the cat out of the bag. Kanye's probably gonna get ... if there's a Cruel Summer then there's got to be a Cruel Winter, right?" He confirmed the project to be in the works the following month, with Pusha T referring to it as a "Q-Tip/Kanye thing." Big Sean also confirmed Cruel Winter to be coming soon, and Malik Yusef, a songwriter and artist signed to the GOOD Music label, posted a photo of him and West on Instagram in the studio. Despite others confirming the project, fellow rapper Common said it was nothing more than a "rumor." In July 2013, Travis Scott stated that West may release Cruel Winter "out of nowhere"; conversely, Pusha T declared that it would not release due to the number of projects West was working on.

In October 2015, after more than two years without updates on Cruel Winter, a rumored tracklist was posted by AllHipHop. The project's ongoing development was confirmed in February 2016 by Cyhi the Prynce, who stated "there was a lot of work done for Cruel Winter." On June 3, 2016, a single titled "Champions" was released by GOOD Music as the lead single for Cruel Winter; the track includes appearances from West, Gucci Mane, Big Sean, 2 Chainz, Travis Scott, Yo Gotti, Quavo, and Desiigner. It initially aired on Big Boy's 92.3, as a yet-untitled single, before being officially released via digital download and streaming services on June 12, 2016. West also teased a 12–15 minute version of the song with the GOOD Music roster, though the idea was later abandoned. In September 2016, Scott announced his role as executive producer for Cruel Winter, and told Hot 97.3 that the album would be released next year. In March 2017, when Cyhi was asked about Cruel Winter, he said West was in "good spirits" and teased a song on the album with him and Sean he called "crazy." By November 2017, Cyhi said the album would come out right after his album. As of 2026, no more has been heard of the project.

=== Yeezus 2 ===
One of multiple concept covers created by Joe Perez for Yeezus 2.

During the development of Yeezus (2013), West collaborated with producer Rick Rubin to help finish the album five weeks before its scheduled deadline. West played Rubin multiple hours of material, as well as a track listing for the album containing sixteen tracks, later cut down to only ten. During these sessions, Rubin suggested cutting Yeezus into two ten-track albums, to which West responded that it was "exactly what I wanted to hear." When asked by Complex if this meant a sequel to the album was on the way, Rubin responded that it "might be."

Under the working title Yeezus 2, West had planned to release a sequel to Yeezus with either new material or leftovers from previous sessions. It was confirmed in December 2013 when he announced a minimalist eight-track album, saying it was done mid-way. He planned to release it by "next summer" and reportedly worked with Q-Tip and Rubin as producers. West stated his album was unnamed, stating "I haven't named my album. But I have started on it." It was speculated that American singer Miley Cyrus missed her post-VMA party to record with West, which was later confirmed when a remix for "Black Skinhead," additionally featuring Travis Scott, leaked online. The album was renamed So Help Me God as its artistic direction began to change, later going by the name Swish before finally releasing as The Life of Pablo.

=== So Help Me God ===
After the abandonment of the Yeezus 2 concept, West began planning to succeed Yeezus with an album titled So Help Me God. In a February 2015 appearance on The Breakfast Club, West stated that he had an album that was "80 percent done" that he intended for an eventual surprise release. On March 1, West announced So Help Me God as his planned title for the album. Alongside the announcement, he posted an image—speculated to be the planned album cover—of a diamond shape with lowercase "m" shapes at each vertex. The image was identified as a 13th-century monastic symbol that represented the Virgin Mary.

Prior to the announcement, West had held a listening party in September 2014 at which the album was played. He also released several singles for So Help Me God in 2014 and 2015, including "Only One", "FourFiveSeconds", and "All Day". Each of these singles featured contributions from Paul McCartney. Based on its singles, music writers predicted that So Help Me God would be a "mellow" pop album focused on family and maturity.

West has described the planned sound of So Help Me God as "cookout music that just feels good", and compared its themes to "Amazing Grace". He additionally contrasted it against Yeezus, stating that while Yeezus was "a protest of music", So Help Me God would be "embracing the music [and] embracing joy". Theophilus London, who wrote a song planned for So Help Me God, reported in March 2015 that West was continually revising the album. In May 2015, West announced that he was changing the title of his next album to Swish. West changed the album's title again in January and February 2016, briefly titling the album Waves before ultimately releasing it as The Life of Pablo. He did not disclose why he changed the album's title, but DJBooth has speculated that the poor chart performance of "All Day" led West to scrap his original plans for So Help Me God.

=== Drake collaborative studio album ===
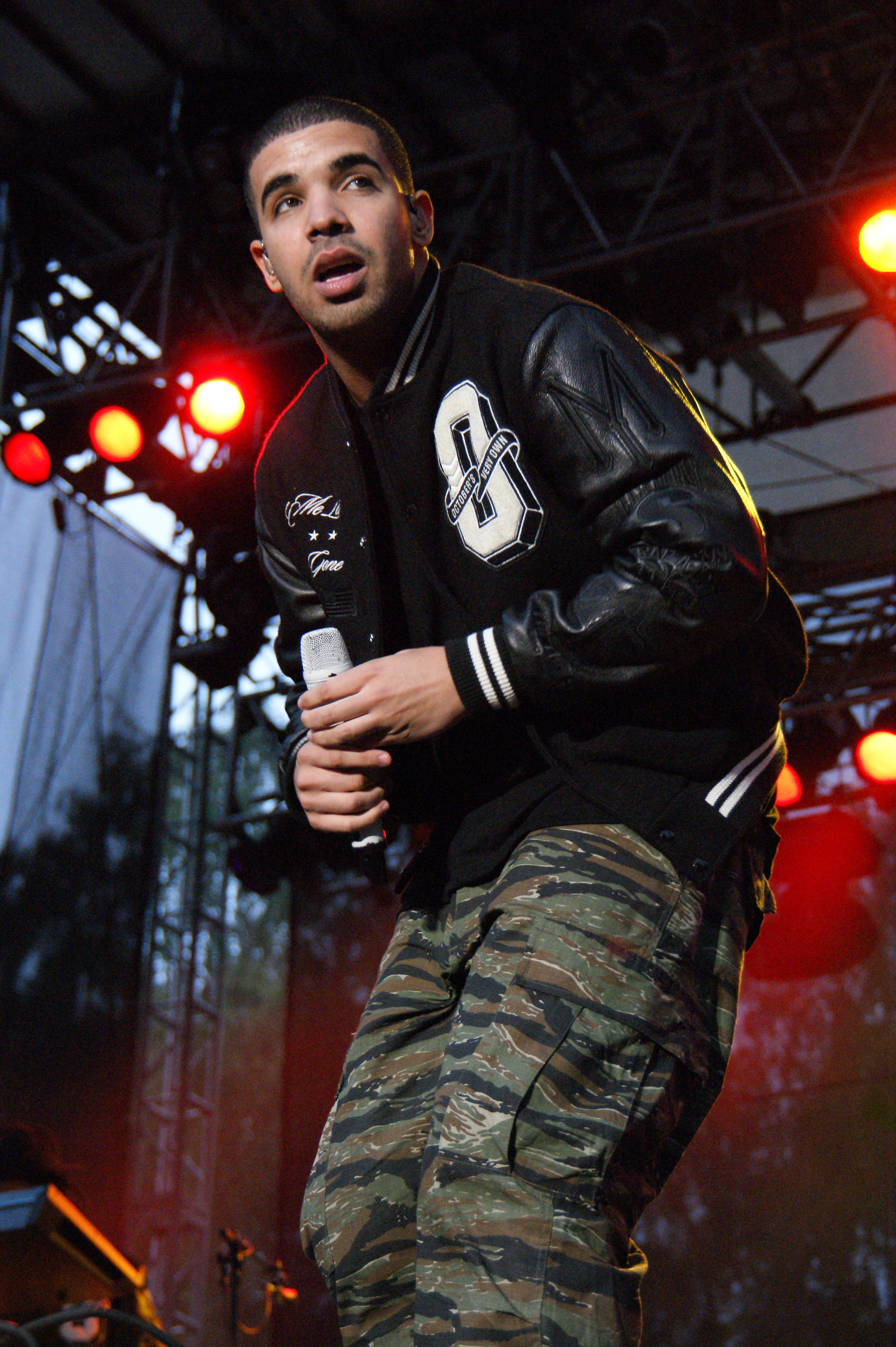
Drake and West first united on the remix to Jamie Foxx's 2009 song "Digital Girl".

In February 2015, West revealed that his song "Wolves"—which debuted at his Yeezy Season fashion show earlier that month—had been conceived out of talks with Canadian rapper Drake over an eponymous potential joint album. It was also speculated that the song supposedly had an alternate version which featured Drake and singer Björk, after screenshots surfaced of the track playing on producer Cashmere Cat's Snapchat. When The Life of Pablo released the following year, Drake was credited as a co-writer on the track "30 Hours." Upon the advent of Drake's 2016 studio album Views, West would frequently refer to an upcoming collaborative project with the artist, once at OVO Fest and again at a stop during his Saint Pablo Tour. Drake would also mention the possibility of a joint mixtape with West in an interview with Zane Lowe on his Beats 1 radio show. A green billboard with the tagline "Calabasas is the new Abu Dhabi" appeared in Los Angeles in August 2016 and featured the logos of both Drake's OVO Sound and West's GOOD Music, right before the latter's appearance at the 2016 MTV Video Music Awards. The two artists would not collaborate again until the release of Drake's 2017 commercial mixtape More Life, where West produced and appeared on the mixtape's fifth single "Glow."

All prospects of a joint album between the two artists were shattered in 2018 with the release of Pusha T's studio album Daytona, which was entirely produced by West. On the album's last track "Infrared," Pusha T sparked a days-long feud with Drake after questioning his songwriting ability. This was immediately followed by Drake responding with his song "Duppy Freestyle," where he criticized both Pusha T and West, and culminated with the release of Pusha T's diss track "The Story of Adidon." Drake and West would seemingly reconcile their differences three years later when the two put on a one-off concert for the benefit of imprisoned Chicago gangster Larry Hoover in December 2021, where both artists performed each other's songs on stage at the Los Angeles Memorial Coliseum.

During a live-streamed interview with DJ Akademiks in April 2025, West disclosed that he had previously reached out to Drake in an effort to offer him the song "Preacher Man" from his twelfth studio album Bully, but was unequivocally turned down by the artist, though maintained hope that the two would eventually work on a future album together:

You know I sent "Preacher Man" off Bully, the intro, to Drake first? ... He just, like, he said something like, "Aw man, I don't mean to spoil your dreams" or some shit. I don't know, he just did his thing and shit. I think before it's all said and done, I'll do an album with him.

West had already been defending Drake in a series of tweets during his resurgence on Twitter earlier in the year, also claiming in a previous interview with DJ Akademiks that Drake is, "a million times better than Kendrick and a million times more important," in reference to his ongoing feud with rapper Kendrick Lamar. During an April 2025 livestream, West's producer Digital Nas claimed that a collaborative album between the two was currently being worked on, though most internet users and media outlets considered this to be untrue, and neither West nor Drake have responded to the claim.

=== Rihanna's eighth studio album ===
At the 2015 Grammy Awards, West announced that he would be the executive producer of Rihanna's next album. West went on to produce Rihanna's 2015 singles "FourFiveSeconds," "American Oxygen," and "Bitch Better Have My Money," but stepped down as executive producer of the full album in January 2016, reportedly to finish recording his seventh studio album The Life of Pablo. When Rihanna released Anti later in 2016, the track listing did not include any of the three singles written and produced by West, nor did any of the songs featured on the album include any contributions from him.

=== Chiraq ===
In 2020, designer Joe Perez revealed on Instagram that West had once commissioned him for art connected to a project titled Chiraq. Little is known about the nature of the project, but Grant Rindner of GQ has noted that the timing would have coincided with Spike Lee's 2015 film Chi-Raq. West was not involved in the final version of Lee's Chi-Raq, though Pitchfork reported that he had been considered as a possible contributor to its soundtrack.

=== Turbo Grafx 16 ===
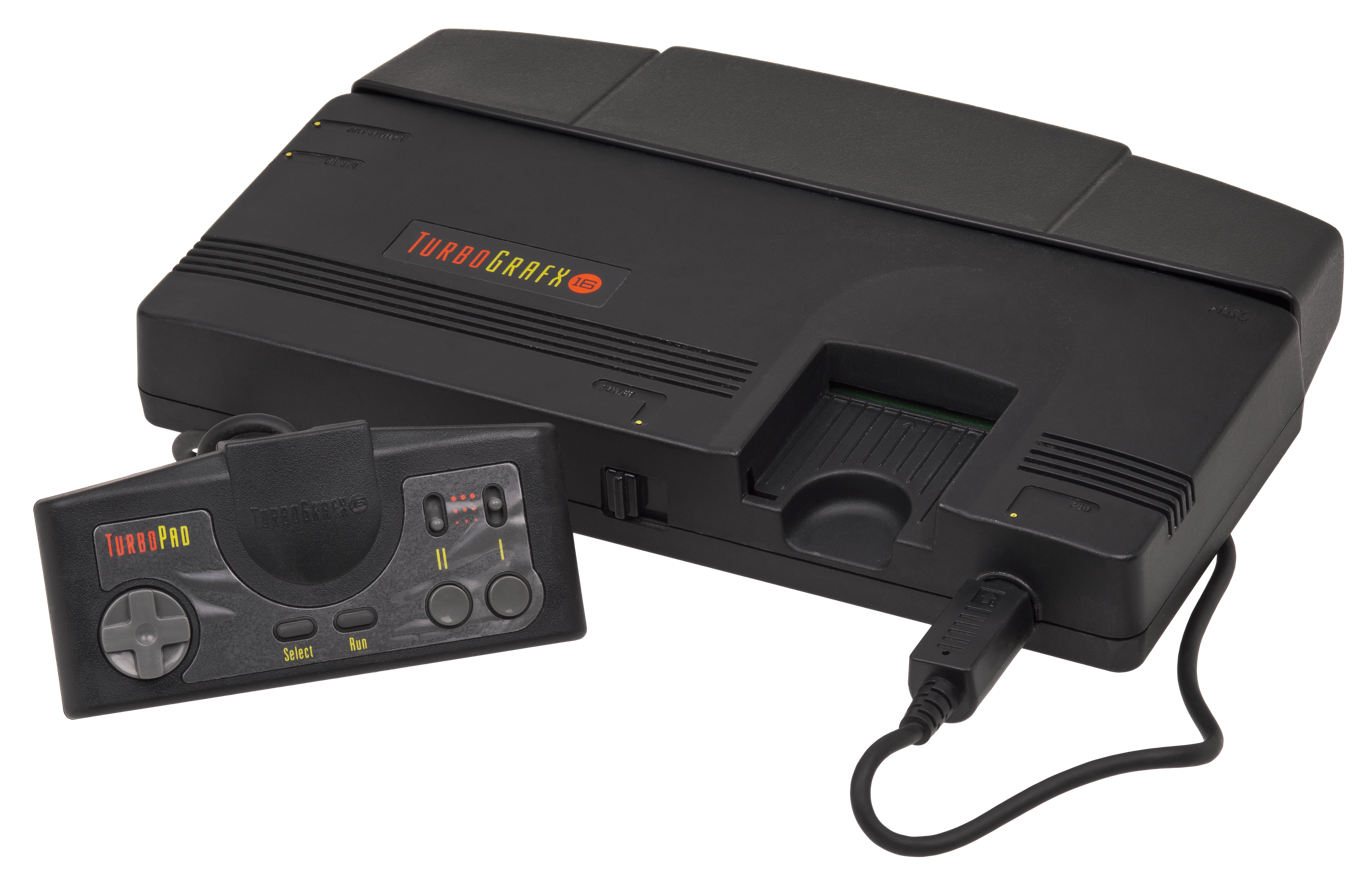
The TurboGrafx-16, the namesake of the album.

Ten days after the initial release of The Life of Pablo, West announced his eighth studio album under the name Turbo Grafx 16. The title references the video game console of the same name, which West identified as one of his favorite consoles. The same month, West associate Ibn Jasper posted a photo on Instagram showing West with longtime collaborators Mike Dean, Plain Pat, and Kid Cudi in a recording studio working on the album. During the production of the album, West worked with emerging artists Lil Yachty, Vic Mensa, Offset, and Quavo, as well as Big Sean and Tyler, the Creator. However, Turbo Grafx 16 did not release in its intended time, with West taking off on the Saint Pablo Tour during the fall of 2016. By November 2016, after West's rant on the final show and his hospitalization, the album was scrapped. Early versions of seven Turbo Grafx 16 songs were leaked online, including collaborations with artists such as Young Thug and A$AP Rocky. Jem Aswad of Variety has described the sound of the leaked tracks as "West's take on trap."

=== Love Everyone ===
In April 2018, West posted a screenshot of a text message conversation to Twitter. In the screenshot, he asked a friend for title suggestions for his upcoming album, and the friend suggested Love Everyone. In the same conversation, West expressed his intention for the album's cover to feature an image of Jan Adams, the plastic surgeon who operated on West's mother Donda shortly before her death. West explained his thinking by stating that he "want[ed] to forgive and stop hating." Adams responded to the post with an open letter, requesting that his image not be used on the album.

In May, West played Love Everyone at an interview with TMZ. Little material from the album has been heard publicly, but it is thought to have featured artists such as Bon Iver, The Weeknd, Travis Scott, The-Dream, and Ant Clemons. In an interview with Charlamagne tha God, West stated that Love Everyone would be a "therapeutic" album and described it as comparable to his track "Real Friends." At his TMZ interview, West made controversial comments about slavery. Multiple outlets have speculated that the backlash to West's remarks led him to abandon his original plans for Love Everyone and adapt the album into Ye. Travis Scott's "Skeletons" from the 2018 album Astroworld was once part of Love Everyone, with a solo demo by West leaking in 2022. One of his verses would later be recorded by Scott for the final version of the song, while other lyrics were reused by West for "Cudi Montage" from Kids See Ghosts (2018).

=== Wyoming Sessions albums ===
After his original run of albums made during sessions in Wyoming, West had planned to release multiple others in the following months. He had planned to release as many as 52 albums during the Wyoming Sessions, as he told a New York Times reporter during a listening session for Ye.

==== Bump J and Sly Polaroid EP ====
In an interview with Fake Shore Drive, Bump J was asked why he and fellow Goon Squad member Sly Polaroid had been recently pictured with West in Wyoming. In response, he revealed that he had been planning a collaborative album with Sly Polaroid produced by West, with co-production by BoogzDaBeast. Ronny J is also believed to have contributed production, as he was featured in an Instagram post West made of a studio session with him and Bump J. The last time West had done production for Bump J was on his 2006 mixtape Chicagorilla.

==== CyHi the Prynce album ====
West had previously planned a "Dr. Dre & Eminem" styled collaborative album with CyHi the Prynce, as revealed by the latter, who tweeted that his 2015 song "Elephant in the Room" was originally created for it, with West giving him the instrumental and the song's concept. West began working work on an album for Cyhi on June 11, 2018, with Cyhi tweeting that West had started putting aside multiple song ideas for him. Cyhi claimed on June 29 that two of West's next Wyoming albums were completed, but weren't released as he "[wanted] to do another one." In June 2019, he would once again claim that he and West were working on "a few albums" together, including his own album, meant to be released by the end of the summer.

=== Good Ass Job (2018 collaborative album) ===
Chance the Rapper, a fellow Chicago rapper who had previously collaborated with West on "Ultralight Beam," stated in a May 2016 interview that he and West intended to revisit and complete Good Ass Job. That September, Chance stated the album was "far from done"; it was predicted that other projects, such as Cruel Winter and a potential Drake collaboration, were likely to be higher priorities for West at the time.

On September 17, 2018, West made a surprise appearance at Chance the Rapper's Open Mike event, revealing that he and Chance were working on an album titled Good Ass Job. After the announcement, no further updates took place, and by the following year it was assumed that the album had been abandoned. Despite the scrapped idea, West has stated that his recording sessions with Chance helped West reconnect with his roots and faith in Christianity. The song "Hurricane," which originated from these sessions, is credited as the catalyst for the creation of Yandhi.

=== Yandhi ===
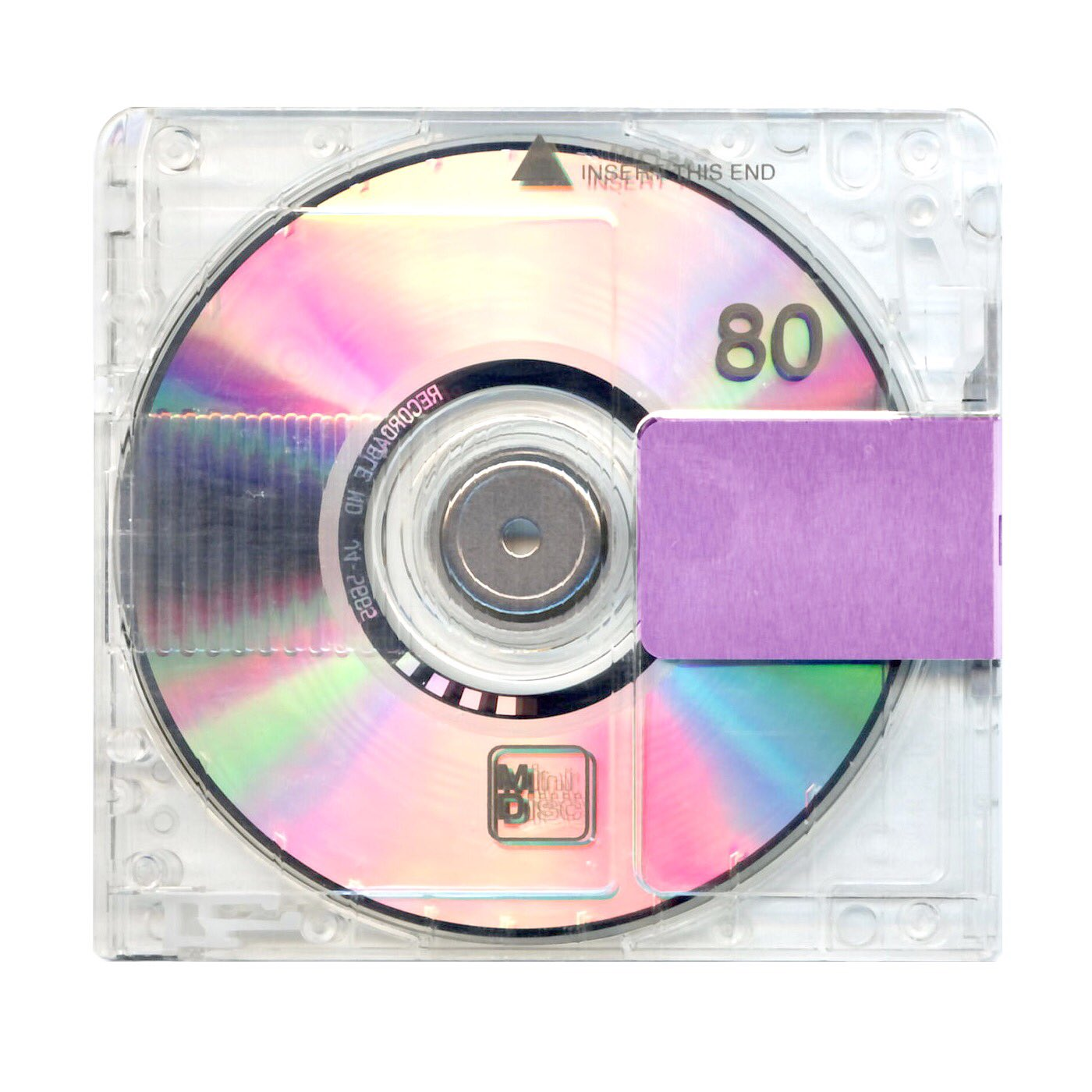
The revealed album cover for Yandhi, featuring a MiniDisc with a purple shutter, similar to that of Yeezus (2013), presumably with the physical version packed the same way.

On September 17, 2018, West announced his ninth studio album Yandhi, revealing the cover art and initial release date of September 29, 2018. The tracklist included tracks such as "We Got Love" with Teyana Taylor and American singer Lauryn Hill (originally intended for K.T.S.E.), (Note: Teyana Taylor later released "We Got Love" as a single in December 2019. The released version was co-produced by West.) "New Body" (featuring Nicki Minaj), "The Storm", "Bye Bye Baby", "Hurricane", "Alien / SpaceX", "Last Name", "Sky City", "Garden", and "Chakras". While Yandhi did not release on its initial date, West was the musical guest for the season 44 premiere of Saturday Night Live. The following day, Universal Music Publishing Group accidentally leaked that the initial version of the album was to be eight tracks long. After missing its initial date, it was rescheduled to November 23, 2018, announced by Kim Kardashian on October 1. That same day of the announcement, West visited the TMZ offices for an interview, admitting that the album was not finished yet and that he would be going to Africa in two weeks to continue recording for Yandhi. West talked about recording in Chicago and how he "felt the roots" but wanted to go further his energy by touching African soil and recording in nature.

On October 12, 2018, West arrived in Uganda and restarted work on the album in a dome-shaped studio set up in the Chobe Safari Lodge at the Murchison Falls National Park. West arrived with around 50 people and recorded for five days. He played new music, including a studio recording of the "We Got Love" remix, for a group of about 100 Ugandan school children during a charity event. In an October 21, 2018, interview, American rapper Quavo stated that his trio Migos had recorded for the album. In November 2018, following a Kids See Ghosts performance with Kid Cudi at American rapper Tyler, the Creator's Camp Flog Gnaw Carnival, West tweeted that he felt Yandhi was not finished, and that he would "announce the release date once it's done", delaying the album indefinitely.

By 2019, West went through a dramatic conversion towards born-again evangelical Christianity, including the formation of the Sunday Service Choir and a performance at Coachella on Easter Sunday, influencing the evolution of Yandhi to what was eventually released on October 19 as his ninth studio album, Jesus Is King. Several songs recorded for Yandhi would later be released by other artists, such as "Shake Dat" by Chief Keef and Mustard, originally titled "Jam 15". On May 1, 2025, West announced on a Kick livestream with Sneako and N3on that he planned to release Yandhi, saying: "We gotta release Yandhi."

=== Kids See Ghosts 2 ===
In 2019, Kid Cudi teased Kids See Ghosts 2, the sequel to Kids See Ghosts, multiple times. According to an interview with Complex, Kid Cudi assured fans that more material from him and West are coming:

There will be more Kids See Ghosts albums. Kanye already told me he wants to start working on the second one. ... With the first album, I didn't know how serious he was about making a collab album with me. He had mentioned it, but I thought it was just a good idea he had in the moment. But then he kept bringing it up and kept having me come to his house, listen to music, and work on beats, so I was like, "Wow, he's really into this." We had a discussion where he said he wanted to make a spiritual album and I told him, "Great. That's what I do. I would love to do that, something I can sink my teeth into." So there will definitely be more.

However, Kids See Ghosts 2 never came to fruition, as West and Kid Cudi began feuding in February 2022. That April, Kid Cudi announced that Pusha T's song "Rock N Roll," on which both Cudi and West were featured, would be the two artists' final collaboration. Cudi and West temporarily reconciled during a December 2023 listening session, and Cudi subsequently appeared on the Vultures 2 track "Gun to My Head." In August 2025, Cudi officially ended his affiliation with West after his controversial statements. In September 2026, Cudi performed with West live on West's Ye Live Concert Tour in Chicago, reopening speculation about the artists working together on new music.

=== Jesus Is King: The Dr. Dre Version ===
On November 18, 2019, West announced a remix version of Jesus Is King with American producer-rapper Dr. Dre. On January 16, 2020, a Dr. Dre-produced version of "Up from the Ashes" (which later appeared on Donda) leaked onto YouTube. Another track, titled "LA Monster," also leaked two months later. In June 2020, American rapper Snoop Dogg posted a video of Dr. Dre and West working on Jesus Is King: The Dr. Dre Version. Later that year, West thanked American rapper Eminem for rapping on Dr. Dre's remix of "Use This Gospel," which was officially released two years later on DJ Khaled's thirteenth studio album, God Did. However, West and Dr. Dre parted their ways and have not made updates on the remix album, with West focusing on Donda, his 2020 presidential campaign, Donda Academy, and Yeezy merchandise, while Dr. Dre had a turbulent following year, with a near-fatal brain aneurysm, his home being burglarized, and eventual divorce.

On September 25, 2023, Jesus Is King: The Dr. Dre Version finally surfaced online in leaks. The album featured guest appearances from Eminem, Snoop Dogg, Anderson .Paak, Travis Scott, Pusha T, 2 Chainz, Marsha Ambrosius, and ASAP Ferg.

=== War ===
Thumbnail of "Last Week", a YouTube video uploaded by West in October 2022, widely regarded as the cover art for War.

War was a collaborative album by West and the English musician James Blake. West previewed tracks produced with Blake at a party in London in September 2022, and a full copy of the album from October 2022 had leaked online after multiple crowdfunding campaigns (referred to as "group buys" in music circles) by December 2025. The next month, West denied collaborator Albe Back's claims to have written for War, saying that the leaked album consisted of his freestyles over Blake's instrumentals. War songs included "What I Would Have Said at Virgil's Funeral", a tribute to Virgil Abloh; "Talking", which later released as a single for ¥$'s album Vultures 1; "Through the High Wire," which Blake repurposed for his 2026 album Trying Times; and "This One Here", which West repurposed as the outro on his 2026 album Bully. Blake later requested that his writing and production credits be removed from "This One Here", citing major differences between the version he helped create and the one that released.

According to Blake, producer No I.D. was present during a recording session for the album. In 2026, Blake stated during a meet and greet with fans who brought him a fanmade War record sleeve that the album was never titled "War" during sessions, though West collaborator Fat Money had previously stated that the album's title was "War."

=== Vultures 3 ===
West announced his and Ty Dolla Sign's Vultures series of collaborative albums as a trilogy, beginning with Vultures 1 in February 2024. Vultures 2 and 3 were planned to follow in March and April. Vultures 2 experienced multiple delays and was not released until August. In January 2025, Ty Dolla Sign said it was still planned and would "rip heads off." He reaffirmed this during a March performance with Peso Pluma, despite West having sparked controversy for antisemitic rants on Twitter the preceding month. However, in April, West indicated that Vultures 3 had been canceled due to his antisemitic statements straining his relationship with Ty Dolla Sign.

=== Carti Ye ===
Prior to the release of Playboi Carti's Music (2025), he and West had been working on a collaborative album, Carti Ye. West pulled out of the project in March 2025 out of anger that his Music features were cut, which he blamed on "Jewish businesses" who "forced" Carti to take him off the album. He posted the cover art on Twitter, which features West in a Ku Klux Klan–inspired hood and Carti in a fur coat and hood, which was also featured in Carti's "2024" music video.

=== Cuck ===
On March 6, 2025, West announced that his upcoming music would feature an "antisemitic sound." On March 15, he first teased the song "WW3" on March 15 on his Twitter account, eventually releasing as a single on March 26, and a controversial music video on April 1, blending a scene from the American television miniseries Roots, clips of interracial sex, and footage of a KKK gathering. On April 2, DJ Akademiks announced that the album, initially titled WW3, would release the next day, and shared the track listing. He also previewed the song "Bianca," with West pleading with Bianca Censori to "come back" after separation. While the album missed its release date, West revealed its album cover, depicting a Klan couple wearing KKK-inspired outfits while posing in front of a stack of hay bales.

On April 21, West announced that the album's title changed to Cuck, described as representing "[his] whole style." He released the music video for its second single "Cousins" on Twitter, based on his traumatic incestuous relationship with a male cousin as a child and his recreational use of nitrous oxide. The music video consists of low quality footage drawn from home media, TV commercials, and pornography. On May 7, West announced its third single "Heil Hitler," releasing its music video the next day, featuring men draped in animal skins singing the chorus, with the outro sampling a speech by Adolf Hitler. He subsequently released the song on SoundCloud and Scrybe shortly before being deleted. An instrumental version titled "The Heil Symphony" was uploaded in its place on May 14. On May 18, 2025, the album was leaked after a $999 charity group buy for the United States Holocaust Memorial Museum via the messaging site Discord, with the album's album artwork and metadata containing derogatory messaging towards West in its media and metadata as a form of protest.

On May 22, West revealed that he was "done with antisemitism" following a FaceTime call with his children, asking God to "forgive me for the pain I've caused" and saying that he forgave those who caused him pain. On June 22, West revealed the album's new title as In a Perfect World. On November 17, "WW3," "Cousins," and "Heil Hitler," along with their alternate versions "Hallelujah" and "Hit Symphony," were removed from streaming services following his apology to Rabbi Yoshiyahu Yosef Pinto. In January 2026, West published an open letter in The Wall Street Journal in which he apologized for his antisemitic remarks and behavior, stating his outbursts stemmed from manic episodes in which he "gravitated toward the most destructive symbol I could find, the swastika," as he refused to accept his bipolar disorder diagnosis. West said he was "deeply mortified by [his] actions" and pledged to "accountability, treatment, and meaningful change."

== Other ventures ==
=== Pastelle clothing line ===
Prior to launching Adidas Yeezy in 2015, West attempted to enter into the fashion world with his original clothing line, Pastelle, as early as 2007. Daniel Beckerman, co-founder of Italian sunglass brand Retrosuperfuture, received an email from West's talent agency, informing him that West wanted to collaborate with him. Shortly after, West assembled a team of 30 designers, consultants and collaborators, to advance the fashion brand Pastelle. GOOD Music-signed musician and designer Taz Arnold praised the brand, and later joined the crew as a consultant the following year.

Kaws, who designed the album cover for 808s & Heartbreak, was hired to help craft the brand's logo, along with Kim Jones, who was Louis Vuitton's men's artistic director at the time. Pastelle was meant to appeal to both men and women with a range of color palettes, including clothing, accessories, jewelry, and footwear. However, by the fall of 2009, many contributors to the Pastelle brand learned it was brought to a stop through online sources, losing direct contact with West and others, as the brand was later scrapped.

=== A Little Inappropriate ===
In 2007, West pitched A Little Inappropriate, a comedy-drama TV series, to HBO, influenced by other HBO TV series such as Entourage and Curb Your Enthusiasm. However, the pilot was rejected by HBO, and eventually leaked in full via YouTube in June 2023.

=== Alligator Boots ===
In 2007, West envisioned the puppet-based sketch comedy TV series, Alligator Boots, which he co-created with Rhymefest. It was meant as a dirty, irreverent spoof of The Muppet Show, hosted by West. According to video director and animator Konee Rok, Kanye met with Jimmy Kimmel, who was working on Crank Yankers and a co-founder of Jackhole Productions, and suggested to Kimmel that they collaborate to create Alligator Boots. It was later pitched to Comedy Central, with a $1 million budget and shot in under five days on the Jim Henson Company Lot. During the production of Alligator Boots, West was the only human star, but came with an idea about a love interest, and decided to bring Kim Kardashian into his show, which was the first time they met. On October 16, 2024, the full pilot for Alligator Boots was leaked on YouTube.

=== Fame Kills ===
In June 2009, Kanye West announced on The View he would be touring with Lady Gaga. The tour would have supported West's fourth album 808s & Heartbreak and Gaga's The Fame Monster EP. It was scheduled to run from November 2009 to January 2010, but was canceled after public controversy regarding West's interruption of Taylor Swift's Best Female Video speech at the 2009 MTV Video Music Awards.

=== Yeezus concert film ===
In February 2014, West uploaded a trailer for a concert film based on The Yeezus Tour to his website. It featured speedy shots of the tour, showing horses running in snow and West wearing his masks. Author Bret Easton Ellis revealed around the same time of the trailer that he was working with the rapper on a project, after having re-imagined a scene from American Psycho (2000) for a promotional clip of the tour. Ellis was reluctant to write for the film until he listened to an advance copy of Yeezus in the summer of 2013; he then crafted a script in "Kanye land." The film was set to be shot by director Hype Williams, who previously directed music videos for West's singles like "Gold Digger," "Stronger," and "Heartless."

In October 2023, Williams explained to Complex how after he shot the film with West in Chicago and Toronto, the two engaged in a dress rehearsal with attention to detail so intense that they lost its original meaning. West was working on The Life of Pablo at this time, therefore he and Williams instead decided to shoot videos for the album. The director and Scooter Braun spent six months negotiating with IMAX for the film's release, although it was discarded due to West's personal issues after his then-wife Kim Kardashian was robbed in Paris. Williams revealed that nobody, not even West himself, has viewed the film and it was filmed in 2014; he compared its significance to an unreleased recording from the likes of the Rolling Stones or the Beatles.

=== Only One video game ===
In February 2015, West announced that a video game based on his mother, Donda West, was in the works. The game was named Only One after the song of the same name, and was intended for release as an iPhone app created by Los Angeles-based film and animation studio Encyclopedia Pictura. The first trailer was revealed during the Yeezy Season 3 fashion show and The Life of Pablo release party on February 11, 2016. Players controlled Donda West as she ascended to Heaven, avoiding obstacles along the way. By November 2016, the game had been canceled.

West had wanted Nintendo to develop and publish Only One, and pitched it to Nintendo's Shigeru Miyamoto at E3 2015. Miyamoto found the pitch interesting and moving, and West later met with Nintendo of America's then-president Reggie Fils-Aimé to discuss it. Fils-Aimé recounted in 2020 that Nintendo had too many ongoing projects at the time to consider Only One.

=== Kids See Ghosts (computer-animated series) ===
On June 26, 2020, a computer-animated series directed by artist Takashi Murakami was announced via social media, with Kid Cudi stating that it was "coming soon." The series chronicles the adventures of Kanye Bear, the character portrayed on West's first three album covers, and Kid Fox, a character created exclusively for the show, both acting as their cartoon personas for the artists. However, no scheduled release date was announced, and it was likely scrapped due to the group's split in 2022, and since 2025, Cudi officially ended his affiliation with West.

== With Donda ==
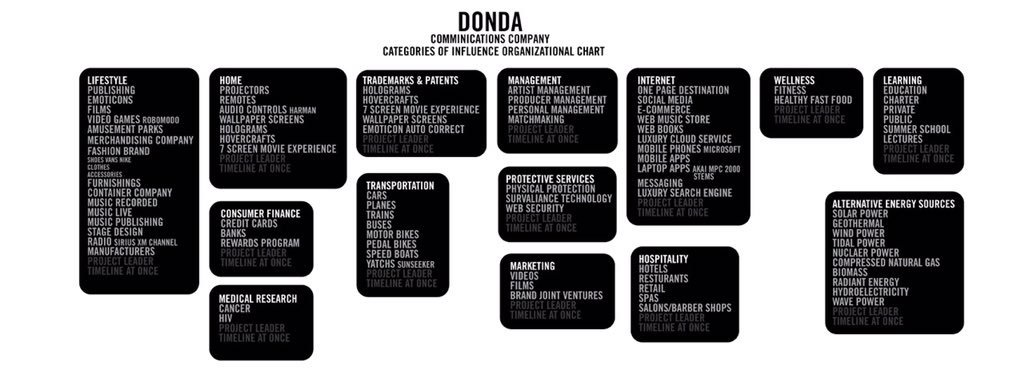
Chart of ventures planned by Donda, created by West in 2012.

West's creative content company Donda, named after his late mother, has announced or conceptualized multiple unrealized projects during its lifetime. West has continually attempted to expand the company's reach beyond music and fashion endeavors, exploring medical research, trademarking, education, and developing surveillance systems. Though most were never expanded upon beyond the initial idea, several others would begin development before being cancelled.

=== Donda cosmetics / Yeezy Beauty ===
In February 2017, TMZ obtained legal documents stating that West was planning to launch a cosmetics line called "Donda." According to the paperwork, the line would include perfumes, lotions, makeup, and other cosmetic products. West's then-family is known for their ventures into the beauty industry, as both ex-wife Kim Kardashian and ex-sister-in-law Kylie Jenner have had successful ventures.

On June 2, 2020, West filed a trademark for "Yeezy Beauty," seemingly serving the same purpose as the Donda cosmetics line. The trademark covered several different types of beauty products, with multiple types of skincare and hair products being planned. Unlike Donda cosmetics, Yeezy Beauty would also provide toothpaste, deodorant, shampoo, and bath gels.

== See also ==
- List of songs recorded by Kanye West § Unreleased songs
