= World Record Holders =

World Record Holders may refer to:

- World Record Holders, an unreleased project by Kanye West
- World Record Holders, a 2022 book by Guy Delisle
