= Lift Yourself =

2018 song by Kanye West

Single by Kanye West
- Released: April 30, 2018
- Genre: Avant-garde
- Length: 2:27
- Label: GOOD; Def Jam
- Songwriters: Kanye West; James Massie; Ben Winters
- Producers: Kanye West; Mike Dean

Kanye West singles chronology
"Glow" (2017)	"Lift Yourself" (2018)	"Ye vs. the People" (2018)

"Lift Yourself" is a song by the American rapper Kanye West. West wrote the song alongside James Massie and Ben Winters, producing it himself with additional production from Mike Dean. It was distributed by GOOD Music and Def Jam as a single on April 30 for digital download and streaming.

West released "Lift Yourself" to insult the Canadian rapper Drake, to whom he had previously offered the instrumental. It was West's first music release since his album The Life of Pablo (2016). Fans and publications have characterized "Lift Yourself" as an act of trolling; following a long buildup that samples Amnesty's "Liberty" and Dancer's "Boom Boom", West scats before the song abruptly ends.

"Lift Yourself" received mixed reviews from music critics, who disliked its lack of seriousness, though some found it humorous and praised the production. It instigated a feud between West and Drake, who was angered by West's use of the instrumental and responded with the diss track "Duppy Freestyle" in May. That month, GOOD Music's president Pusha T confirmed a version with proper lyrics exists; it has not been released.

"Lift Yourself" peaked at number two on the US Billboard Bubbling Under Hot 100 chart, while also appearing on charts in Ireland, New Zealand, and Sweden. West and the Sunday Service Choir performed it live on multiple occasions in 2019, including for a performance at the Coachella Valley Music and Arts Festival. Smokepurpp released a remix in April 2018, to which West expressed approval.

== Background and development ==
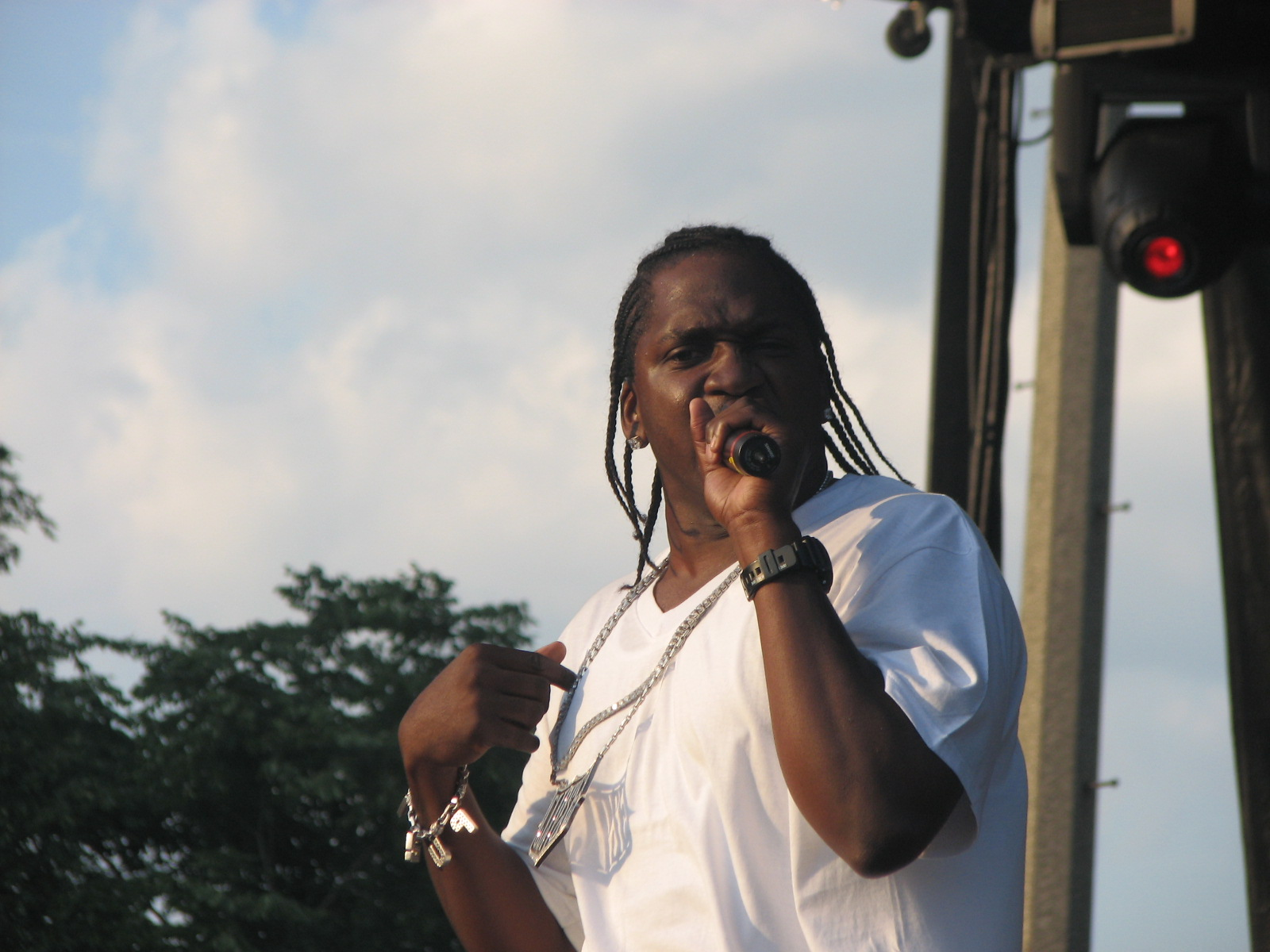
After numerous sources voiced the belief that West was trolling, Pusha T confirmed a serious version exists.

"Lift Yourself" samples the guitar and vocal demo recording "Liberty" by American funk group Amnesty, who had re-issued a number of their recordings through Now-Again Records by 2018, including the compilation album Free Your Mind: The 700 West Sessions (2007). The record label has an affiliation with Stones Throw Records, which American musician Madlib is signed to; he worked with West on the latter's seventh studio album The Life of Pablo (2016). Now-Again founder Eothen "Egon" Alapatt licensed the usage of "Liberty" for West, following on from him having previously cleared a sample of Amnesty's work for frequent West collaborator Jay-Z's song "F.U.T.W." in 2013. Alapatt admitted that he found out about the track "five hours before it went live" and recalled having to "pre-clear a song I didn't hear, and expect to work out the details later in a way that was equitable to everybody." He continued, remembering "listening to ['Lift Yourself'] that evening" and being like, "You've got to be kidding me." Alapatt stated he thought to himself that he "just said yes to an internet troll, and no one's gonna get paid, and it's gonna be a complete nightmare," but believed things turned out to be "cool" in the end. Although he found "Liberty" on a demo tape in 2001 and later released it on Free Your Mind: The 700 West Sessions, Alapatt did not recognize how great the recording was until West sampled it.

Shortly before the release of "Lift Yourself", West announced the track via Twitter. As part of the announcement, he used fire emojis to represent the track's "bars", promising to put out a song with a verse that will bring Hot 97 radio disc jockey Ebro Darden "the closure he's been seeking;" this promise was made after Darden had recently criticized West for his right-wing political views. Due to marking the first song dropped by West for a while, the April 2018 release of the track ignited excitement. However, after listening, the track sparked fans and multiple publications, including Pitchfork, Uproxx, Good Morning America, and XXL, to believe that West was trolling them. In response to the track, Darden tweeted: "We already knew you was #TrollYeWest." The track was produced by West, with additional production from Mike Dean. West co-wrote it with James Massie and Ben Winters.

GOOD Music president Pusha T revealed on May 25, 2018 that a version of "Lift Yourself" with "real other lyrics" exists and may be released on West's then-upcoming album. (Note: West's eighth studio album Ye was ultimately released on June 1, 2018 without the song included.) Pusha T continued, voicing the belief the track's beat being "so fire" demonstrates West's "level of confidence and arrogance," and recalled that during the creation of the released version, West was like, "You know what? I'mma throw this out and show them what I think of all that. It's nothing."

"Lift Yourself" instigated a feud between West and the Canadian rapper Drake. West had offered the "Lift Yourself" instrumental to Drake, who interpreted West's use of it as an insult. After Pusha T's album Daytona, produced by West and released in May 2018, included a song, "Infrared", that mocked him, Drake responded with the diss track "Duppy Freestyle". In September 2018, West admitted that Drake wanted the instrumental and was angered over how he used it, and that he should have given Drake an opportunity before releasing "Lift Yourself".

== Composition and lyrics ==
"Lift Yourself"
A 21-second snippet of "Lift Yourself", featuring a transition from a chopped and sped-up sample of Amnesty's "Liberty", which is used for the lyrics and melody, to West's performance. West starts by informing listeners that he is about to deliver a great verse, before rapping nonsense lyrics that involve variations of the words "poop," "scoop," and "whoop."

"Lift Yourself" has been described as an avant-garde track, which features scatting from West. For the first two minutes of the song, a chopped up sample of "Liberty" by Amnesty is used to construct its lyrics and melody. The sample speeds Amnesty's vocals up, being reminiscent of West's early production work with the speed alteration technique. "Lift Yourself" also includes a sample of "Boom-Boom" (1987) by Dancer. The song features drum programming, which was contributed by Benji B. After "Liberty" is sampled for roughly two minutes, "Lift Yourself" transitions into West's performance during the remainder, with him delivering it in around 30 seconds close to the end of the song.

Before West's verse starts, he assures listeners that it is going to be great, warning them to "watch this shit go." In West's verse, he utters nonsensical phrases based around the words poop, scoop, and whoop. West's verse includes him saying, "Whoopdedy-scoop, whoopdedy-whoop-scoop-poop, poop, poop," and the song abruptly ends after the verse. The editors' notes on iTunes questioned whether the song is meant as inspiration or an inside joke by West.

== Release and reception ==
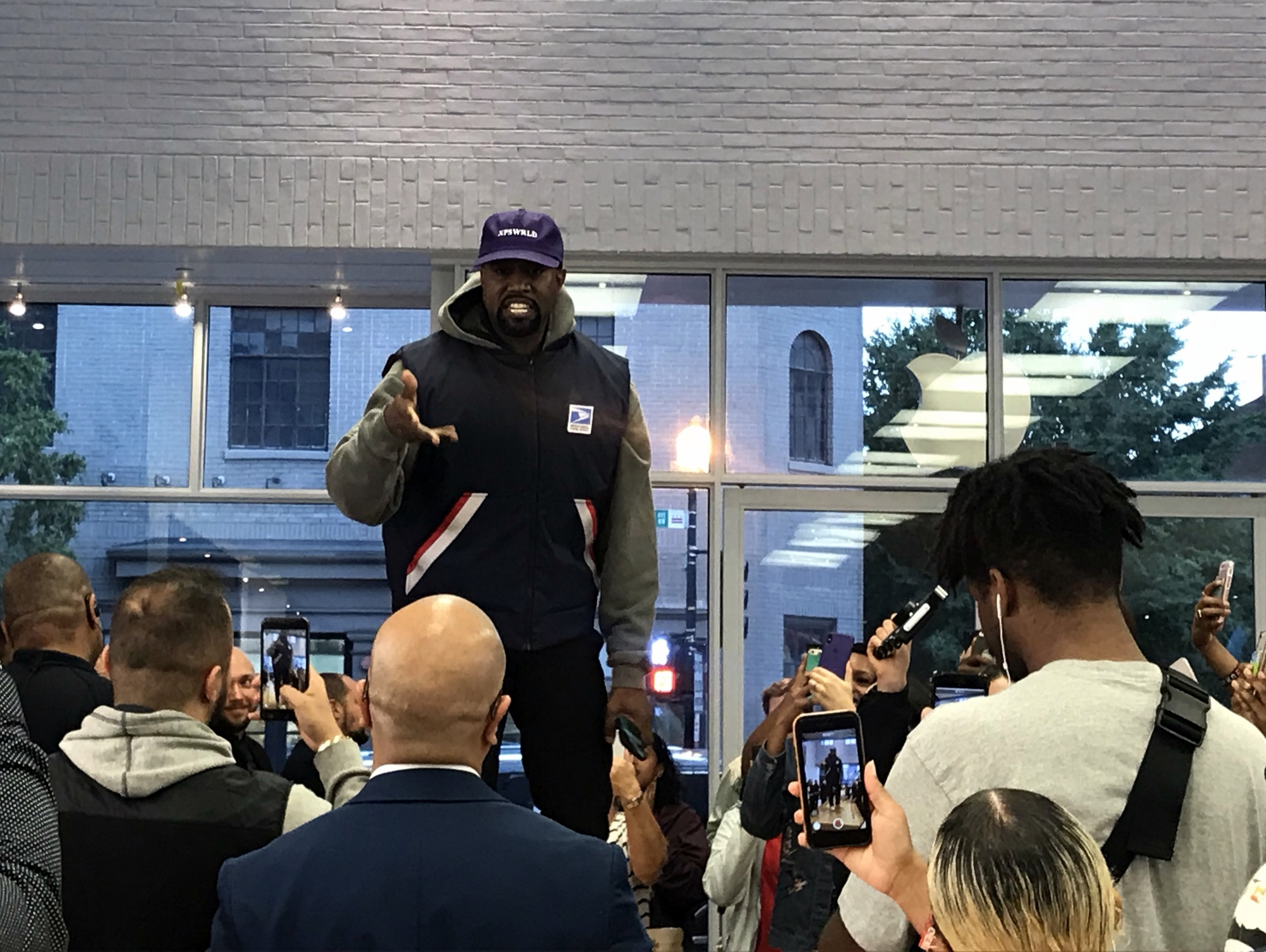
West's lyrical style on "Lift Yourself" was commonly written off by critics.

West announced the song on April 27, 2018. Once the website loaded, it played the track's MP3 file. "Lift Yourself" marked West's first piece of new music since The Life of Pablo in 2016. It was released for digital download and streaming as a single on April 30, 2018. The track was met with mixed reviews from music critics, who often criticized its lack of seriousness. Alex Young was highly negative in Consequence of Sound, saying the track is "not really a song so much as a musical poop joke," panning West's performance. Vulture's Frank Guan slammed the song as "terrible" and commented that West "inhabits a theatre of the absurd where scatological squibs count as songs and ignoring your critics constitutes a constructive dialogue with them," citing his position as being obviously stupid. The staff of Dazed analyzed that "Lift Yourself" is "not really a song" and is instead "what appears to be more ephemeral pranking," specifically writing off West's lyrical performance. Pitchfork writers Amanda Wicks and Braudie Blais-Billie noted "Lift Yourself" for being a "strange, gibberish track."

Tom Breihan of Stereogum pointed out that the song is "clearly a goof" but "sort of catchy," though praised the sped-up sample for showing West has been "digging back through his old bag of tricks" and also complimented the "echoing, cavernous, almost dancehall-esque drums." Breihan confessed that the song, along with "Ye vs. the People" and West's political nature being expressed in 2018, demonstrated West had not thought things through. Corbin Reiff from Uproxx called the song an "unapologetic" and "flatulent troll job," but highlighted the "fire" beat and concluded by pointing to "Lift Yourself" as a "massive upgrade" over "Ye vs. the People". In a positive review for Rolling Stone, Christopher R. Weingarten opined that dismissing the track "as the musical version of trollface.jpg is shortsighted and ahistorical." He elaborated by expressing certainty the lyrics "are complete and total jabberwocky" while writing that "immediately washing your hands of them ignores a long, proud, defiantly pop tradition of gibberish in popular music" and questioning, "Where would music be without nonsense?" Weingarten acknowledged the track "may be the first rap song from a major celebrity to truly embrace the aesthetics of SoundCloud rap" and viewed it as "uplifting instead of moody," as well as noting the "classic Eighties sample-chop techniques." XXL author Peter A. Berry lauded the track for West's execution of "one of the best trolls of 2018 thus far," which Berry attributed to the lyrical content.

"Lift Yourself" debuted at number five on the US Billboard Bubbling Under Hot 100 chart for the issue dated May 12, 2018, selling 4,000 copies and receiving 7.2 million streams in its first week. The song was outperformed by the debut of West's "Ye vs. the People" that week, which entered at number 85 on the US Billboard Hot 100. The following week, "Lift Yourself" rose three places on the US Bubbling Under Hot 100, peaking at number two. The song lasted for two weeks on the chart. In Sweden, "Lift Yourself" peaked at number 91 on the Sverigetopplistan chart. The song entered at number 94 on the Irish Singles Chart. It further reached number six on the New Zealand Heatseekers chart.

== Live performances and other usage ==
Kanye and the Sunday Service Choir were joined by North West in performing the song live at the Coachella Valley Music and Arts Festival in April 2019, which coincided with Easter.

West and his gospel group the Sunday Service Choir performed a rendition of "Lift Yourself" at the group's first concert on January 7, 2019, with the performance beginning at the concert's 4:11 mark. Later that month, the Sunday Service Choir delivered a rendition of the song at their second concert. For a Sunday Service concert on March 17, 2019, West and the group performed a gospel version of the song. During the performance, Kanye's daughter North West started to dance as he leant down while performing. Kanye and the Sunday Service Choir headlined the 2019 Coachella Festival on April 21, coinciding with Easter that year, and performed the song as part of their set. At one point of the performance, Kanye allowed North to deliver certain lyrics from the song, who requested her cousin Penelope Disick to join in while performing.

On April 28, 2018, rapper Smokepurpp shared his remix of "Lift Yourself" via Twitter, later releasing it on SoundCloud and his website. Similarly to Kanye West's performance on the original, Smokepurpp trolls on the remix, which includes him delivering random sounds and ad-libs. He does not make a complete bar or rhyme scheme on it, though mentions fellow rapper J. Cole. West posted the remix to Twitter on the same day as its release, explaining he did not do this "as a diss to J Cole," saying he loves him and "also love[s] where Purp took his flow." West re-used the nonsense "whoop" and "scoop" words from the song on Pusha T's track "What Would Meek Do?", which was released in May 2018 on his third studio album Daytona. The following month, West rapped "scoop" on "Freeee (Ghost Town, Pt. 2)" by Kids See Ghosts, a duo consisting of him and Kid Cudi, from the duo's eponymous debut studio album. West released "XTCY" as a single in August 2018, which features him alluding to "Lift Yourself" by performing "whoopity-scoop" ad-libs.

On May 14, 2025, rapper 1900Rugrat released a remix of "Lift Yourself" on streaming services, titled "Lift Yourself Freestyle".

== Credits and personnel ==
Credits adapted from Tidal.

- Kanye West – production, songwriter
- James Massie – songwriter
- Sidney Winters – songwriter
- Mike Dean – additional production, mastering engineer
- Andrés Osorio – assistant recording engineer
- Sean Solymar – assistant recording engineer
- Noah Goldstein – mixer, programmer, recording engineer
- Benji B – programmer

== Charts ==
Chart performance for "Lift Yourself"
Chart (2018)	Peak position
Ireland (IRMA)	94
New Zealand Heatseekers (RMNZ)	6
Sweden (Sverigetopplistan)	91
US Bubbling Under Hot 100 (Billboard)	2

== Certifications ==
Certifications for "Lift Yourself"
Region	Certification	Certified units/sales
United States (RIAA)	Gold	500,000^{‡}
^{‡} Sales+streaming figures based on certification alone.
