= Ye vs. the People =

2018 single by Kanye West and T.I.

Single by Kanye West starring T.I. as the People
- Released: April 30, 2018
- Recorded: May 2018–April 2018
- Genre: Hip hop; political hip hop
- Length: 3:22
- Label: GOOD; Def Jam
- Songwriters: Kanye West; Clifford Harris; Lamont Dozier; Brian Holland; Edward Holland Jr.
- Producer: Kanye West

Kanye West singles chronology
"Lift Yourself" (2018)	"Ye vs. the People" (2018)	"Watch" (2018)

T.I. singles chronology
"Friends" (2017)	"Ye vs. the People" (2018)	"Jefe" (2018)

"Ye vs. the People" is a song by American rapper Kanye West. It stars a guest appearance from fellow rapper T.I., with him being credited as the People. The song was solely produced by West, who co-wrote it with T.I., and due to the work of the Four Tops being sampled, Lamont Dozier, Brian Holland, and Eddie Holland were credited as songwriters. Following a conversation West had about his support of Donald Trump with T.I. in the studio, the rappers recorded the song in April 2018. On April 27, 2018, it premiered via Power 106. The song was released for digital download and streaming as a standalone single by GOOD Music and Def Jam three days later. T.I. stated in July 2018 that he never believed West would release the song. A hip hop track, it contains a sample of the Four Tops' "7 Rooms of Gloom".

The song sees West and T.I. engaging in a debate, with the rappers expressing their contrasting views on Trump. "Ye vs. the People" received mixed reviews from music critics, who were somewhat divided in their opinions towards the political nature of it. While they were often ambivalent about the performance of West that discusses politics, critical commentary around T.I.'s appearance was moderately positive and a few reviewers criticized the former's thought process for the song. It debuted at number 85 on the US Billboard Hot 100 in 2018, standing as the first time a track with T.I. as a performer reached the Hot 100 since 2014.

== Background and recording ==
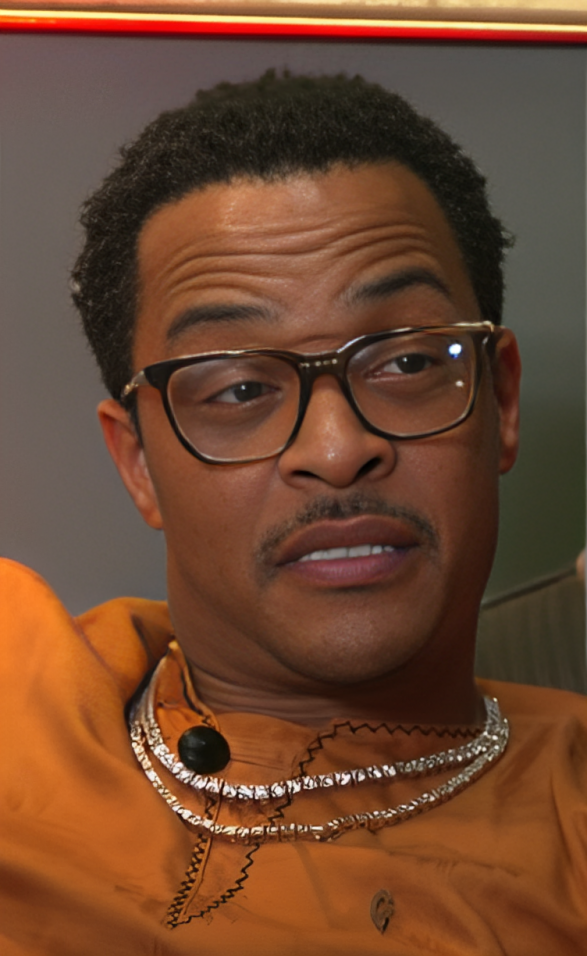
Before the two of them recorded the song, T.I. (pictured in 2020) spoke to West about the latter's Donald Trump support.

West and T.I. had worked together on several tracks before "Ye vs. the People", including the collaborative single "Swagga Like Us" (2008). On April 27, 2018, T.I. shared a post to his Instagram Story about collaborating with West. T.I. recalled in the post that he had spent the previous day "wit Kanye... Long term work in progress, No Doubt." He continued, expressing optimism that something from their discussion "gon STICK...I refuse to just give up on him." Concluding the post, T.I. asserted: "The Old Ye' TOO IMPORTANT!!!"

On May 1, 2018, West shared edited behind-the-scenes footage of him and T.I. in the studio to the former's website. The footage shows the recording of the song in April 2018. T.I. says to West about the consequences of 2017-2021 US president Donald Trump's policies and rhetoric that when lives are lost, "as artists that gives us an obligation to stand up against all of that kind of shit." West explains to him that he put a Make America Great Again (MAGA) hat on to force "an evolution" due to knowing "so much more in the past three days because I'm getting this energy, positive or negative," in agreement or disagreement with Trump. T.I. responds by telling West the intentions of the rapper are pure from his knowledge but the direction he took to get there is "a bit unorthodox and kind of, some people would say, thoughtless," to which West replies that wearing a MAGA hat is "like a fight for equality." West informs T.I. he does not agree with half of "the shit Trump does," which leads to T.I. pressuring him to explain what Trump does that he is in agreement with. According to West, he agrees with Trump's "ability to do what no one said you could do" because doing "the impossible is the most inspiring thing to me." After their discussion, the two begin to record "Ye vs. the People" in the footage, with the song being based on the debate they had earlier. The rappers are shown individually sitting down to record their respective parts, though West gives T.I. numerous tips such as instructing him where to come in on the song with his counter points.

T.I. later reminisced on his discussion with West in July 2018, assuring that the two highly respect each other while saying he thought "the conversation was had with a high level of respect and admiration on both sides, and we just wanted to share our views." He explained by stating he "wanted to pick" West's brain and "get his thoughts" to grasp "a better understanding of where he was coming from and what he was attempting to say," but T.I. admitted he desired for West to do the same for him "and we did that successfully over a five-hour period." According to T.I., they decided to record "Ye vs. the People" at the end of the period for detailing the conversation's highlights even though the rapper revealed he "never thought" West would release the song due to "the blatant honesty," as T.I. wanted to say things he "felt people walking the streets would say" and "give [the song] a very organic feel." The song credits T.I. as starring under the moniker of the People, with him representing the many who questioned West's support of Trump. Hours after sharing "Lift Yourself", West premiered the song on April 27, 2018. A radio rip of it was made available at the time, before the song's single release three days later. The song's production was solely handled by West, who wrote it alongside T.I., Lamont Dozier, and Brian and Eddie Holland; the latter of the three wrote the Four Tops' "7 Rooms of Gloom" (1967), which the song samples.

== Composition and lyrics ==
"Ye vs. the People"
A 19-second snippet of "Ye vs. the People", featuring a sample of the Four Tops' "7 Rooms of Gloom" alongside West rapping against T.I.'s criticism of his Trump support by mentioning issues that differentiate from it.

Musically, "Ye vs. the People" is a hip hop track. The song features a sample of "7 Rooms of Gloom" by the Four Tops, which its instrumentation is built around. For the beginning of the song, the sample is used. Multiple outlets described "Ye vs. the People" as a debate between West and T.I.; the rappers take turns to perform throughout the song.

In the lyrics of the song, West defends his support of Trump while T.I. criticizes him over the support. West also expresses frustration over the pressure on African-Americans to be Democrats. West begins by rapping that U.S. president Barack Obama "was heaven-sent" but Trump's victory proves the rapper "could be president," which closely places together Democratic superstition and Independent possibility. T.I. suggests West's right-wing political views are bigger than his own "selfish agenda," also complaining to him about Trump's lack of a response to police brutality in the US. West boasts about wearing a MAGA hat, claiming that doing so added empathy to the campaign slogan. In response, T.I. expresses disappointment in West for having worn "a dusty ass hat to represent the same views as white supremacy." At the end of the song, West offers an invitation to further debate.

== Release and reception ==
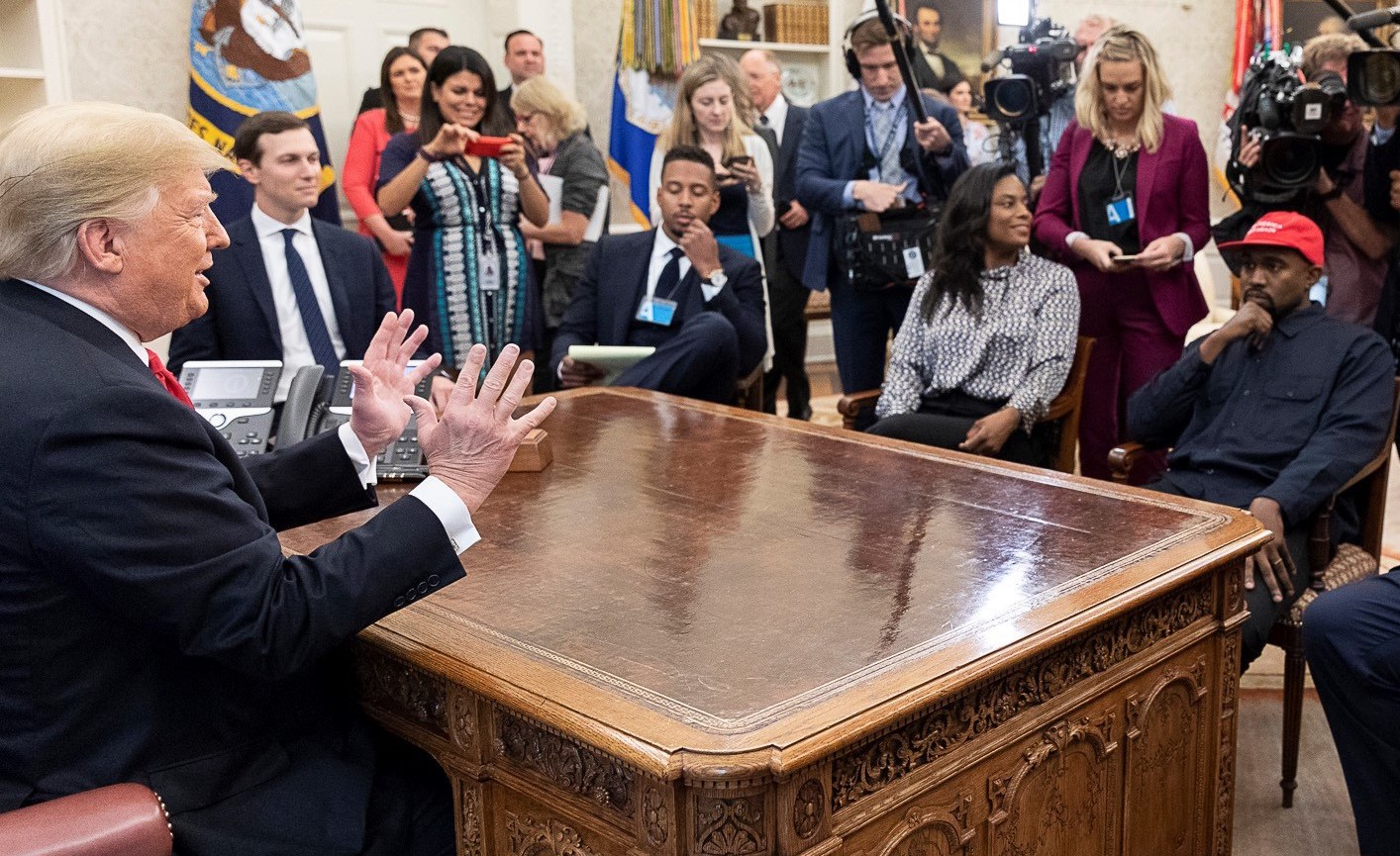
Numerous critics had divided opinions of West's vocals, particularly placing emphasis on the expression of his Trump support.

West premiered the song by playing it on a loop for Los Angeles radio station Power 106 on April 27, 2018. While the song was played, the DJs often refrained "POWER 106." During West's appearance on the radio station, he announced the song's release as a single. On April 30, 2018, "Ye vs. the People" was released for digital download and streaming as a single by West's record labels GOOD Music and Def Jam. At the time, it was not known if the song was set for release on West's then-upcoming eighth studio album. (Note: West's eighth studio album Ye was ultimately released on June 1, 2018 without the song included.)

"Ye vs. the People" was met with mixed reviews from music critics, who were generally split in their feelings towards its political nature. The staff from Variety labeled the song "a point-for-point debate" that features West putting across "some of his most coherent, if still highly debatable and naive, arguments about his pro-Trump stance to date" and gave credit to him for allowing "T.I. plenty of room to make his case as well." Writing for National Review, Armond White commented that the song "mops up" Kendrick Lamar's "litany of immiserated ghetto complaints by using hip-hop" for revival of African-American discourse alongside stating West "urges his widened audience to rethink the current controversy" with his "exploration of musical styles and public address." White explained that West presents "his case while advancing political discussion," which he viewed numerous hip hop albums by other artists as failing to do and praised him for actually presenting a conversation while viewing the song as lacking similarities to propaganda. Despite opining that "T.I. does not rap at West's level," White complemented how his voice "has that Southern drawl that legions of white pop critics and culture vultures swear by as the only genuine Negro voice." Sam Moore of NME described the song as "far superior" to "Lift Yourself" and highlighted the "excellently-crafted" sample-driven instrumental, as well as opining that the "plain-talking" from T.I. "clearly wins the day" on the song.

In a review for Vulture, Frank Guan panned the "terrible" song despite calling West's response to T.I.'s criticism of his Trump support "more substantive, or at least less blatantly trolling" than his response to Ebro Darden's similar concerns on "Lift Yourself" and admitted that he "sees fresh angles" where "others see walls." Stereogum critic Tom Breihan derided the song by pointing out it is "slapdash, thrown-together" and an attempt at commenting on West's Trump support that is "rushed and ill-thought-out" to the same extent as a bad Saturday Night Live (SNL) cold open. He asserted that the beat is "pretty good, but it's not enough" while writing off the "terrible" mastering, though he praised T.I.'s rapping against West for using "straight-faced logic to roast the shit out of him" and panned how all West does "is splutter the same inane, meaningless bullshit he's been saying on Twitter," dismissing him as "rapping for circles." Breihan concluded that the song, as well as "Lift Yourself" and West's political nature being showcased in 2018, demonstrated West had not thought things through. Corbin Reiff from Uproxx slammed the song as "a groan-inducing duet" between West and T.I. while noting it for being "downright cringe-worthy in almost every respect" and even worse than "Lift Yourself", as well as criticizing West's "ignorance" in his "thoughts and ideas" presented against T.I. Reiff continued, expressing a dislike for the rappers' flow but praising how T.I. at least "comes in with concrete and cogent ideas."

== Commercial performance ==
"Ye vs. the People" entered the US Billboard Hot 100 at number 85 for the chart issue dated May 8, 2018. It stood as West's first entry on the Hot 100 since he was featured on Drake's single "Glow" in April 2017 and marked T.I.'s first entry since his single "About the Money" in November 2014. The song outperformed the simultaneous debut of West's "Lift Yourself", which opened at number five on the US Bubbling Under Hot 100. "Ye vs. the People" received 7.4 million streams and 12,000 downloads in its first week, debuting at number 32 on the US Digital Song Sales chart. It further reached number eight on the US R&B/Hip-Hop Digital Song Sales chart. On the New Zealand Heatseekers chart, the song charted at number three.

== Track listing ==
Digital download / streaming

1. "Ye vs. the People (starring T.I. as the People)" – 3:22

== Credits and personnel ==
Credits adapted from Tidal.

- Kanye West – producer, songwriter
- T.I. – songwriter, additional vocals, participant
- Brian Holland – songwriter
- Edward Holland Jr. – songwriter
- Lamont Dozier – songwriter
- Mike Dean – mastering engineer, mixer
- Noah Goldstein – recording engineer
- Andrés Osorio – assistant recording engineer
- Mike Snell – assistant recording engineer
- Sean Solymar – assistant recording engineer

== Charts ==
Chart performance for "Ye vs. the People"
Chart (2018)	Peak position
New Zealand Heatseekers (RMNZ)	3
US Billboard Hot 100	85
US R&B/Hip-Hop Digital Song Sales (Billboard)	8

== Release history ==
Release dates and formats for "Ye vs. the People"
Region	Date	Format(s)	Label(s)	Ref.
Various	April 30, 2018	Digital download; streaming	GOOD; Def Jam	

== See also ==
- Donald Trump in popular culture
