= Shake Dat =

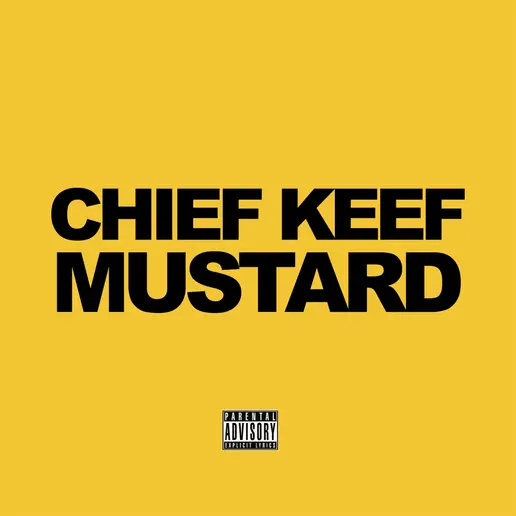

Single by Chief Keef and Mustard
- Released: August 15, 2025
- Recorded: December 2018
- Genre: Southern hip-hop
- Length: 1:40
- Label: 10 Summers Records; 43B
- Songwriters: Keith Cozart; Dijon McFarlane; Michael Crooms; Shahrukh Khan
- Producers: Mustard; Mr. Collipark; Glyttryp

"Shake Dat" (originally "Jam 15") is a song by American rapper Chief Keef and American record producer Mustard. Originally recorded with Kanye West for his cancelled album Yandhi, the song was officially released on August 15, 2025, after going viral on TikTok. It samples "Whistle While You Twurk" by the Ying Yang Twins.

== Background and release ==
"Shake Dat" was originally recorded during a session for Kanye West's unreleased studio album, Yandhi. Simply titled "Jam 15", it featured verses from both Chief Keef and West, as well as additional production from Timbaland. After going viral on TikTok, the song was officially released on August 15, 2025.

== Critical reception ==
"Shake Dat" received generally positive reception. Zachary Horvath of HotNewHipHop complimented its sample of "Whistle While You Twurk" as "addictive", calling it "a track made for the strip clubs." Stereogum's Tom Breihan wrote that it's "very short but very fun", noting that although the beat seems unchanged from the original Ying Yang Twins song, he likes it regardless. At Vibe, Breezy Brown opined: "Built for the viral era but grounded in early-2000s Southern rap roots, 'Shake Dat' stands out as one of the week’s most fun, replay-worthy drops." XXL named it one of the best releases of the week.

== Personnel ==
Credits adapted from Tidal.

- Chief Keef – vocals, songwriter
- Mustard – songwriter, production, engineer, mixer
- Mr. Collipark – songwriter, production
- Glyttryp – songwriter, production
