= 7AM on Bridle Path =

2021 song by Drake

Song by Drake

from the album Certified Lover Boy
- Released: September 3, 2021
- Length: 3:59
- Label: OVO; Republic
- Songwriters: Aubrey Graham; Ronald LaTour, Jr.; Dylan Cleary-Krell; David Duodu; Maneesh Bidaye
- Producers: Cardo; Dez Wright

"7AM on Bridle Path" is a song by Canadian rapper Drake from his sixth studio album Certified Lover Boy (2021). It was produced by Cardo and Dez Wright. The song takes aim at American rapper Kanye West.

== Background and composition ==
The song is named after Bridle Path, Toronto, where Drake's multi-million dollar home is located and which is a reference to Kanye West leaking the address online. Over "wavy" production, through the use of puns and boasting and rapping one long verse, Drake focuses on the disrespect he receives from the media, touching on gossip, jealousy, and the hypocrisy of the accusations that he uses ghostwriters. Although not mentioning him by name, Drake's criticisms are particularly directed toward West: he refers to West's music declining in quality with a reference to social media influencer Justin Laboy, who uses a catchphrase of "respectfully" and was often mentioned in the rollout of West's album Donda ("You over there in denial, we not neck and neck / It's been a lot of years since we seen you comin' correct / Man, fuck a 'Respectfully,' I just want my respect / They tried to label me mean, I say what I mean / People that could've stayed on the team / They played in between"). Later, Drake alludes to West posting his Toronto address on Instagram: "You know the fourth level of jealousy is called media / Isn't that an ironic revelation? / Give that address to your driver, make it your destination / 'Stead of just a post out of desperation / This me reachin' the deepest state of my meditation/While you over there tryna impress the nation / Mind's runnin' wild with the speculation." He then addresses the short-lived reconciliations during their feud: "Why the fuck we peacemakin', doin' the explanations / If we just gon' be right back in that bitch without hesitation?"

== Critical reception ==
The song received generally positive reviews. Nathan Evans of Clash commented on the song, "He definitely sounds at home, unleashing his best verses in a while". Writing for The Line of Best Fit, William Rosebury considered it a "peak-Drake on track" from Certified Lover Boy. Gary Suarez of Entertainment Weekly called it an "impressive standout". Sam Moore of The Independent wrote, "Simultaneously solipsistic and self-effacing, he reminds us on this track of a past greatness, one that has been on the wane since 2013's Nothing Was the Same."

== Charts ==
Chart performance for "7AM on Bridle Path"
Chart (2021)	Peak position
Australia (ARIA)	28
Canada Hot 100 (Billboard)	10
France (SNEP)	108
Global 200 (Billboard)	16
South Africa (TOSAC)	12
Sweden Heatseeker (Sverigetopplistan)	9
UK Audio Streaming (OCC)	24
US Billboard Hot 100	16
US Hot R&B/Hip-Hop Songs (Billboard)	13
