= Search and Rescue Optimal Planning System =

Search-and-rescue planning system

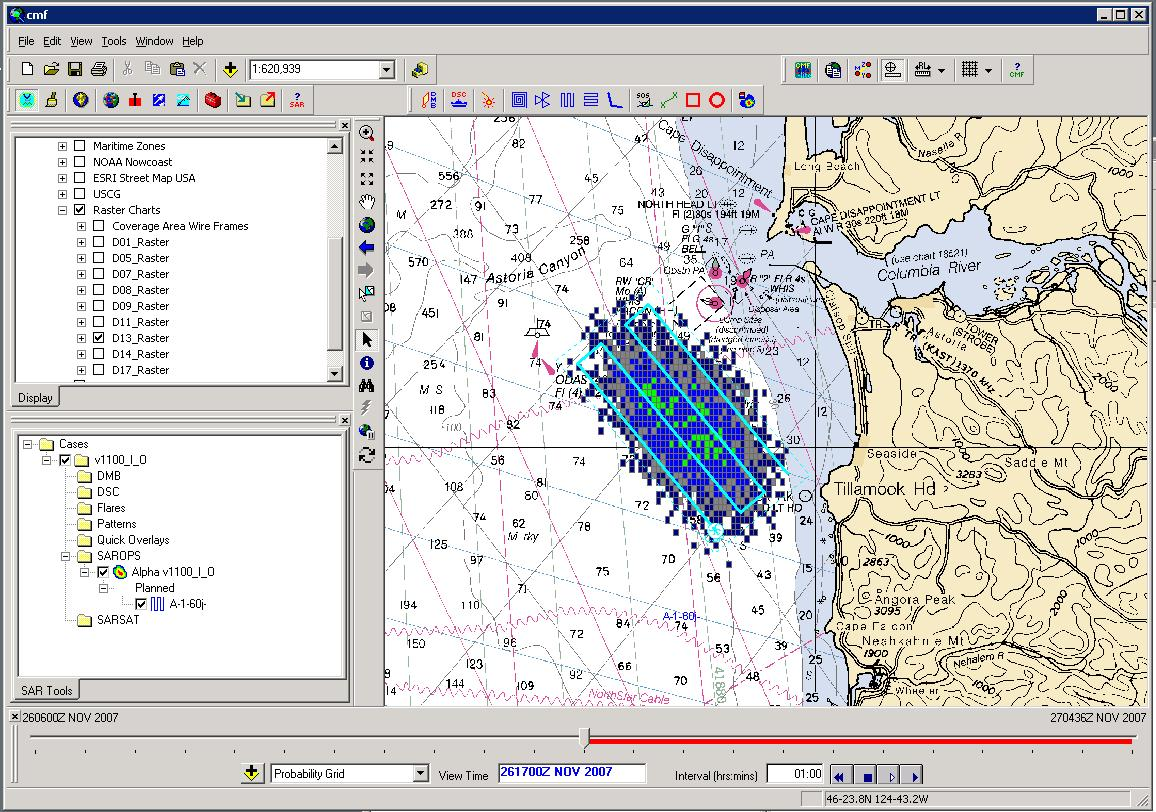
SAROPS output

Search and Rescue Optimal Planning System (SAROPS) is a comprehensive search and rescue (SAR) planning system used by the United States Coast Guard in the planning and execution of almost all SAR cases in and around the United States and the Caribbean. SAROPS has three main components: The graphical user interface (GUI), the Environmental Data Server (EDS) and the Simulator (SIM). Using the Commercial Joint Mapping Tool Kit's (C/JMTK) government licensing of the Geographic Information System (GIS) SAROPS can be used in both a coastal and oceanic environment. Built into the simulator is the ability to access global and regional wind and current data sets making SAROPS the most comprehensive and powerful tool available for maritime SAR planners.

== Historical search planning tools ==
Prior to SAROPS, SAR controllers in the U.S. Coast Guard used the Computer Assisted Search Planning (CASP) and Joint Automated Work Sheets (JAWS), which used dated search planning techniques and algorithms. More specifically, CASP was based on old computing technology and JAWS was taken directly from pen and pencil techniques for shorter durations of drift in coastal environments. Environmental data consisted of low-resolution (1-degree latitude/longitude grid) wind and current information that was applied every 12 hours. For most areas, CASP used monthly-averaged current values while JAWS used one wind and current value during the SAR case. Neither system was capable of accessing timely high-resolution wind nor current model output, which was a significant disadvantage since one of the main components that determine the accuracy of the drift solution is the presence of precise and accurate wind and current information for the given area of interest.

== Motivation for the development of SAROPS ==
The U.S. Coast Guard uses a systematic approach for search and rescue operations. There are five SAR stages for any case: Awareness, Initial Actions, Planning, Operations and Conclusions. Upon becoming aware of a case from a "MAYDAY" call or other form of communication, SAR controllers work to gather data about the case and more often than not, there are many uncertainties in the initial report. The controller, then, must develop a search area based upon the information, estimate resource availability and capability, promulgate the search plan and deploy the resources. While the assets are conducting a search, the controller begins the process again by gathering additional information, developing a subsequent search, deploying resources and evaluating previous searches. This process continues until the survivors are found and rescued or proper authorities suspend the SAR case. Consequently, there is a need for a tool that is fast, simple, minimizes data entry, minimizes potential for error, can access high-resolution environmental data, and create search action plans that maximize the probability of success. Furthermore, the National Search and Rescue Plan of the United States (2007), challenges search and rescue communities in the following passage:

Recognizing the critical importance of reduced response time in successful rescue and similar efforts, a continual focus will be maintained on developing and implementing means to reduce the time required for:

a. Receiving alerts and information associated with distress situations;
b. Planning and coordinating operations;
c. Facility transits and searches;
d. Rescues; and

e. Providing immediate assistance, such as medical assistance, as appropriate.

If this is not motivation enough, a USCG rotary-wing aircraft costs $9–14K per hour and a USCG cutter costs $3–15K per hour to operate. Reducing the time an aircraft is airborne or a cutter is in a search area can considerably reduce taxpayer costs as well as save lives and property. The U.S. Coast Guard contracted Northrop Grumman Corporation, Applied Science Associates (ASA), and Metron Inc., to develop a comprehensive system that included the latest graphical divergence parameters, Leeway divergence parameters, and Monte Carlo methods to improve the probability of success of search cases. SAROPS meets and exceeds these expectations by minimize planning and response time frames.

== SAROPS components ==
SAROPS is made up of the graphical user interface (GUI), the Environmental Data Server (EDS) and the Simulator (SIM).

=== Graphical user interface (GUI) ===
The graphical user interface uses the Environmental Systems Research Institute (ESRI) Geographic Information System (ArcGIS) and has been altered to include U.S. Coast Guard specific applications such as the SAR Tools Extension and SAROPS Extension. The applications have a wizard-based interface and work within the ArcGIS layered environment. Vector and raster charts are available for display as well as search plans, search patterns, search area environmental data, and probability maps. Finally, the GUI provides reports on all search operations.

=== Environmental Data Server (EDS) ===
The Environmental Data Server (EDS) collects and stores environmental information for use within SAROPS. Local SAROPS servers around the United States request environmental information from the EDS based upon the area of interest. Different environmental products are cataloged on the server ranging from observational systems to modeling products. Observations include sea surface temperature, air temperature, visibility, wave height, global/region tides and currents to name a few. High-resolution model output from operational forecast models like the hybrid coordinate ocean model (HYCOM) and Global NRL Coastal Ocean (NCOM) provide temporally and spatially varying wind and current information. Lastly, the EDS is capable of providing objective analysis tools and aggregation. The list of available products is always changing as researchers in the Navy, local universities and research centers continually improve the accuracy and reliability of products and make them available on a consistent basis.

=== SAROPS Simulator (SIM) ===
==== Definitions ====
- Probability of Containment (POC): The likelihood of the search object being contained within the boundaries of some area. It is possible to achieve 100% POC by making the area larger and larger until all possible locations are covered.
- Probability of Detection (POD): The likelihood of detecting an object or recognizing the search object. Different aircraft, environmental conditions and search object types can give a different probability of detection. Generally, the probability of detection decreases with increasing distance from the search object.
- Probability of Success (POS): The likelihood that a search object will be found. POS depends upon the POC and the POD. POS = POC x POD

==== Simulator Wizard ====
The simulator wizard makes use of multiple pages of scenario descriptions that are entered by the user in order to compute the possible distress positions and times, subsequent search object drift trajectories, and the effect of completed searches on the search object probabilities. The simulator captures uncertainty in positions, time environmental inputs and leeway parameters. Upon receiving all of the information pertinent to the case, the simulator, using Markov's Monte Carlo method, simulates the drift of up to 10,000 particles for each scenario. For every 20 minutes of drift, the simulator accounts for changes in water current, wind leeway and leeway divergence. The simulator displays the results as a probability density map that can be animated over the drift duration. Figure 1 depicts this type of map. The ensemble trajectory model, random walk and random flight model governing equations are fully explained in Breivik and Allen (2008) and Spaulding, et al. (2005) that is located within O'Donnell, et al. (2005). In short, the goal of the simulator is to maximize the probability of success.

==== Optimal Planning Wizard ====
The optimal planning wizard takes the probability map information as well as another set of user inputs such as the type of resources, on scene conditions and sweep width values to develop search areas that maximize the POS. The search areas can be adjusted by the SAR controller to further maximize POS. Armed with the best possible fit given available resources, the SAR controller can then transmit the search pattern to the search assets. If the search object is not found on the first search, the optimal planning wizard will account for previous unsuccessful searches when recommending subsequent searches.

== Applications outside of search and rescue ==
SAROPS may be expanded to include other applications outside of search and rescue. These applications may include but are not limited to the projection of fisheries stocks and oil spill projections.

== Real world use ==
SAROPS was used in the response to the Deepwater Horizon explosion and assisted in the ultimate recovery of 115 persons.
