= The Story of O.J. =

Song by Jay-Z

from the album 4:44
- Released: June 30, 2017
- Genre: Conscious hip-hop
- Length: 3:52
- Label: Roc Nation; Universal
- Songwriters: Shawn Carter; Dion Wilson; Nina Simone; Gene Redd; Jimmy Crosby
- Producers: No I.D.; Jay-Z (co.)

Music video
- "The Story of O.J." on YouTube

"The Story of O.J." is a song by American rapper Jay-Z from his thirteenth studio album 4:44. It was produced by Jay-Z and No I.D. Following the release of the album, the song charted in multiple regions, entering and peaking at number 23 on the US Billboard Hot 100, as well as charting at number 88 on the UK Singles Chart. It received three nominations at the 60th Annual Grammy Awards: Record of the Year, Best Rap Song, and Best Music Video. The song features samples from Nina Simone's song "Four Women". The song's instrumental was used by American rapper Pusha T in his 2018 diss track against Canadian rapper and singer Drake. American rapper YoungBoy Never Broke Again also remixed the song in 2020.

== Music video ==
The music video for "The Story of O.J." premiered on July 5, 2017 on Jay-Z's Vevo account on YouTube. It was directed by Jay-Z and Mark Romanek.

The video uses a style similar to the Censored Eleven cartoons, depicting several well-known stereotypes associated with African Americans. Among other things, the video touches on African American culture, various roles within the black community, and how the black community is affected by money. O. J. Simpson (the song's namesake) is featured saying the line, "I'm not black, I'm O.J.," a reference to the idea that wealth, notoriety, and fame can transcend race. Rolling Stone declared it the best music video of 2017 and placed it at #35 on their list of 150 Best Rap Music Videos of All Time.

== Controversy ==
One of the song's lyrics "You wanna know what's more important than throwin' away money at a strip club? Credit. You ever wonder why Jewish people own all the property in America? This how they did it" caused backlash as many have called it antisemitic to suggest Jews own all the property in America and they did it by "credit." Hadley Freeman penned an article in The Guardian stating that the song "repeats a racist trope about Jewish people" and that "it can’t just be laughed off as a compliment."

Talent manager Guy Oseary and producer Russell Simmons defended Jay-Z, with Oseary argued the lyric was a "way to showcase a community of people that are thought to have made wise business decisions." An Anti-Defamation League representative told Rolling Stone that they do not believe Jay-Z’s intent was to promote antisemitism but that they were "concerned that this lyric could feed into preconceived notions about Jews and alleged Jewish ‘control’ of the banks and finance.” Jay-Z said on the Rap Radar podcast referring to the imagery in the video in relation to the controversial lyric: "It’s hard for me to take that serious, because I exaggerated every black image in the world. [...] Of course I know Jewish people don’t own all the property in the world. I mean, I own things! It was an exaggeration [...] In the context of the song, I’m trying to say, you guys did it right!"

== Awards ==
Year	Ceremony	Award	Result
2018	60th Grammy Awards	Record of the Year	Nominated
2018	60th Grammy Awards	Best Rap Song	Nominated
2018	60th Grammy Awards	Best Music Video	Nominated

== Personnel ==
- Steve Wyreman – guitar, bass, celeste, CS-80, electric piano
- Gimel "Young Guru" Keaton – recording
- Jimmy Douglass – mixing
- Dave Kutch – mastering

== Charts ==
=== Weekly charts ===
Chart (2017)	Peak position
Canada Hot 100 (Billboard)	53
France (SNEP)	103
UK Singles (OCC)	88
UK Hip Hop/R&B (OCC)	27
US Billboard Hot 100	23
US Hot R&B/Hip-Hop Songs (Billboard)	10

== Certifications ==
Region	Certification	Certified units/sales
United States (RIAA)	Platinum	1,000,000^{‡}
^{‡} Sales+streaming figures based on certification alone.

== Samples ==
- Nina Simone - Four Women (Sample appears at 0:00, 0:11, and 1:10)
- Funk, Inc. - Kool Is Back (Sample appears at 1:46)
