= The Story of Adidon =

2018 diss track by Pusha T

- The cover features Drake in blackface in a picture taken in 2007.

Promotional single by Pusha T
- Released: May 29, 2018
- Recorded: May 25-28, 2018
- Genre: Hip-hop
- Length: 3:09
- Lyricist: Terrence Thornton
- Producer: No I.D.

"The Story of Adidon" is a diss track by the American rapper Pusha T released amidst his and fellow GOOD Music label mate Ye's highly publicized feud with the Canadian rapper Drake. It was released on May 29, 2018, on SoundCloud, as a response to Drake's "Duppy Freestyle".

"The Story of Adidon" reuses the instrumental from Jay-Z's "The Story of O.J.", which was produced by No I.D. and samples "Four Women" by Nina Simone. In "The Story of Adidon", Pusha T revealed the existence of Drake's son, Adonis; he accuses Drake of hiding his son from the public while exploiting black culture for commercial gain. The cover art features a 2007 image of Drake in blackface.

"The Story of Adidon" received acclaim from critics, who praised Pusha T's lyricism and fearlessness. Several publications named it one of the best songs of 2018, and it is regarded as one of the greatest diss tracks of all time. Drake confirmed his fatherhood on the album Scorpion in June 2018. He did not respond to "The Story of Adidon" and conceded that he lost his feud with Pusha T in 2019.

== Background ==
On May 25, 2018, Pusha T released his third studio album, Daytona, produced by Kanye West. The album's last track, "Infrared," contained alleged references to Drake and ghostwriting. Drake responded by releasing the diss track "Duppy Freestyle" a few hours later, in which he insulted Pusha T and West. The song garnered significant media attention. Pusha T first responded that day on Twitter. "The Story of Adidon" was released four days later. Drake believed that West told Pusha T about his fatherhood, which served as the basis for "The Story of Adidon". However, Pusha T denied this, saying he instead learned of it from the OVO Sound producer 40.

== Composition ==
In the diss track, Pusha T raps over the instrumental of Jay-Z's 2017 song "The Story of O.J." from his 13th studio album 4:44, which itself features samples from Nina Simone's song "Four Women". Pusha T revealed Drake had a child named Adonis with French former pornstar Sophie Brussaux. Pusha T also attacks Drake's alleged insecurities regarding his race, and mocks 40 for looking frail due to his multiple sclerosis. The track was titled "The Story of Adidon" after Drake's rumored upcoming Adidas line, which would have publicly revealed Drake's son Adonis, who would have been used heavily in promotion and advertising. "Adidon" is a portmanteau of Adidas and Adonis.

After a month of speculation, Drake confirmed he had a son with Brussaux in lyrics from his fifth album Scorpion. He did not respond to "The Story of Adidon" and conceded that he lost his feud with Pusha T in December 2019.

== Artwork ==
The cover features a 2007 photograph of Drake in blackface, originally taken by David Leyes during a photo shoot that year. Drake commented on the cover, saying that "the photo represents how African Americans were once wrongfully portrayed in entertainment," and how these frustrations had not changed since.

== Critical reception ==
The track received critical acclaim despite its controversy. Pitchfork deemed "The Story of Adidon" as Best New Track that week and listed it as the 31st best song of 2018.

"The Story of Adidon" was named song of the year by Noisey. Complex listed it fifth in its songs of the year list, and praised the first verse as the best rap verse of 2018. The Tampa Bay Times ranked "The Story of Adidon" at number 10 on their "50 Best Songs of 2018" list, while Pitchfork described it as "at once a three-dimensional chess move and vicious sucker punch." Doreen St. Felix of The New Yorker wrote that Pusha T's lyrics are "like a horror-movie psychiatrist, excavating a patient only to use deep-set pathologies against him."

=== All-time lists ===
Name of publisher, name of listicle, year(s) listed, and placement result
Publisher	Listicle	Year(s)	Result	Ref.
Billboard	The 15 Most Scathing Hip-Hop Diss Songs of All Time	2024	2nd	
Complex	The 50 Best Hip-Hop Diss Songs of All Time	2024	7th	
The Ringer	The Greatest Diss Tracks of All Time, Ranked	2024	5th	
HipHopDX	100 Greatest Diss Songs in Hip Hop History: Ranked	2024	6th	

== See also ==
- List of diss tracks
- Drake–Kanye West feud
- Drake–Kendrick Lamar feud
