= Duppy Freestyle =

2018 song by Drake

Song by Drake
- Released: May 25, 2018
- Recorded: May 25, 2018
- Genre: Hip hop
- Length: 3:08
- Label: Self-released
- Lyricist: Aubrey Graham
- Producer: Boi-1da

"Duppy Freestyle" is a song by Canadian rapper Drake. Released on May 25, 2018, the song is a diss track aimed at American rappers Pusha T and Kanye West. The song was produced by Boi-1da and Jahaan Sweet.

== Background ==
On the final track of Pusha-T's 2018 album Daytona, "Infrared", Pusha-T perpetuates allegations of ghostwriting which have been leveled against Drake. In response to the track, Drake released a song on the same day of the album's release called Duppy Freestyle. Drake posted on Instagram a few hours after the release of this song, sending subliminals to Pusha-T with a photo of a bill OVO had sent to G.O.O.D Music and Def Jam for $100,000 captioned “You’re welcome”. The satirical reason behind the bill was “promotional assistance and career reviving". The song garnered significant media attention, as well as a response from Pusha-T on Twitter. Pusha-T responded to the track by releasing a response track titled "The Story of Adidon" four days later.

== Synopsis ==
See also: Drake–Kanye West feud

“Duppy Freestyle” takes shots at G.O.O.D Music artists Pusha T and Kanye West. The word “duppy” is Jamaican patois for an evil spirit or ghost, which effectively means that Drake is using the title of the song to call Pusha-T a malevolent spirit. During the song, Drake implies that he ghostwrote music for Kanye West in Wyoming, while calling him a "leech and serpent" for resenting his former collaborator Virgil Abloh, as he left Kanye's company Yeezy to become Creative Director of Louis Vuitton. He also questioned the extent and extravagance of Pusha-T and his brother Malice's drug dealing background. Drake ended the song by denying the ghostwriting allegations brought up by Meek Mill in their 2015 rap beef, and name dropping the wife of Pusha-T.

The music sampled is Táta Vega’s Motown song entitled “Ever So Lovingly”.

== Release and reception ==
Matthew Schnipper from Pitchfork said, "He lets loose a big old exasperated sigh... then he proceeds to dismantle Pusha with glorious pettiness." Aron A. from HotNewHipHop rated the song "Very Hot", and went on to say, "...this song is fire and the two emcees are delivering an incredible moment in hip hop with their back and forth." Max Grobe from Highsnobiety said, "Following the major digs on Pusha T's track "Infrared", Drake swiftly dropped a reactionary diss track on SoundCloud, and Toronto's finest has not held back at all."

== See also ==
- List of diss tracks
