= Search & Rescue (song) =

2023 single by Drake

Single by Drake
- Released: April 7, 2023
- Recorded: 2022
- Studio: The Chapel (Toronto); Sanctuary (Nassau)
- Genre: R&B; hip hop
- Length: 4:32
- Label: OVO; Republic
- Songwriters: Aubrey Graham; Benjamin Saint-Fort; Patrick Saint-Fort; Jeremiah Raisen; Wesley Curtis; Miles McCollum; Noah Shebib
- Producers: Bnyx; BeautifulMvn; SadPony; Curtis

Drake singles chronology
"Spin Bout U" (2023)	"Search & Rescue" (2023)	"Who Told You" (2023)

Visualizer
- "Search & Rescue" on YouTube

"Search & Rescue" is a song by Canadian rapper Drake. It was released through OVO Sound and Republic Records as a single on April 7, 2023. Drake wrote the song with producers Bnyx and BeautifulMvn, SadPony, and Wesley Curtis, and co-producers Lil Yachty and 40.

The song received attention for sampling a quote from Kim Kardashian in a 2021 episode of Keeping Up with the Kardashians, in which she discussed her divorce from Kanye West. The song debuted and peaked at number two on the Billboard Hot 100 on the week of April 22, 2023.

== Background ==
Drake posted a preview of the then-titled "Rescue Me" on his Instagram on March 25, 2023. On March 31, the full track premiered on The Fry Yiy Show, part of his SiriusXM radio station "Sound 42". On April 6, the rapper announced the song release and posted the artwork. It depicts a headshot of Drake and Too Hot to Handle star Sabrina Zima wearing black motorcycle helmets.

On March 26, 2023, a day after Drake posted a preview of the song, rapper Lil Durk posted an Instagram story saying "@champagnepapi if you reading this it ain't too late". It would later be revealed that this post was in reference to Lil Durk's verse on the song, as a version featuring him would leak online on June 11, 2023. The early version omits Drake's second verse for a verse from Lil Durk. Lil Durk also provides adlibs throughout the song.

== Composition ==
Over a rhythmic and "laidback" keyboard loop, Drake expresses his desire for a woman to save him from his current lifestyle. The rapper also recites what he is looking for in a partner, including "ambition, patience, honesty, and trust".

The song marks the first and second collaboration between Drake and producers BNYX and Sadpony respectively, the latter following "Jumbotron Shit Poppin", taken from Her Loss (2022). The New York Times described Drake's performance as "hovering above a morbid, anxious piano figure".

The track most notably gained attraction for sampling a dialogue between Kim Kardashian and Kris Jenner, taken from the 2021 season finale of Keeping Up with the Kardashians that sees the former talking about the divorce from Kanye West.

== Chart performance and impact ==
In the United States, "Search and Rescue" debuted and peaked at number two on the Billboard Hot 100 on the week of April 22, 2023. The song was blocked from the top spot on the chart by Morgan Wallen's "Last Night".

In August 2023, Kim Kardashian attended a Drake concert in Los Angeles, where she 're-created' the dialogue sampled in the song by yelling the sampled quote “I didn’t come this far, just to come this far and not be happy, remember that!”

The song was ultimately not included as part of the rapper's For All the Dogs album released in 2023.

== Critical response ==
In a review for Complex, writer Jordan Rose gave a critical review of the song. Rose argued that pre-release interest surrounding the inclusion of the Kardashian quote—coupled with early and ultimately false speculation that Kardashian was the woman pictured on the cover—overshadowed the song itself. While praising the song's production ("It’s well-produced, thanks to Philadelphia beatmaker BNYX") in line with other "ominous beat selections" made by the rapper, he argued the song "doesn't land because of its weak verses and all the weird trolling in between".

== Charts ==
=== Weekly charts ===
Weekly chart performance for "Search & Rescue"
Chart (2023)	Peak position
Australia (ARIA)	8
Australia Hip Hop/R&B (ARIA)	4
Austria (Ö3 Austria Top 40)	30
Canada Hot 100 (Billboard)	4
Denmark (Tracklisten)	40
France (SNEP)	118
Germany (GfK)	49
Global 200 (Billboard)	2
Ireland (IRMA)	6
Latvia (LaIPA)	7
Lithuania (AGATA)	16
Luxembourg (Billboard)	7
MENA (IFPI)	8
Netherlands (Single Top 100)	40
New Zealand (Recorded Music NZ)	11
Norway (VG-lista)	31
Portugal (AFP)	37
South Africa (TOSAC)	2
Sweden (Sverigetopplistan)	53
Switzerland (Schweizer Hitparade)	13
UK Singles (OCC)	5
UK Hip Hop/R&B (OCC)	4
US Billboard Hot 100	2
US Hot R&B/Hip-Hop Songs (Billboard)	1
US Rhythmic Airplay (Billboard)	1

=== Year-end charts ===
Year-end chart performance for "Search & Rescue"
Chart (2023)	Position
Canada (Canadian Hot 100)	46
Global 200 (Billboard)	148
US Billboard Hot 100	45
US Hot R&B/Hip-Hop Songs (Billboard)	15
US Rhythmic (Billboard)	17

== Certifications ==
Certifications for "Search & Rescue"
Region	Certification	Certified units/sales
Australia (ARIA)	Platinum	70,000^{‡}
Brazil (Pro-Música Brasil)	Gold	20,000^{‡}
^{‡} Sales+streaming figures based on certification alone.
