= Kid Cudi filmography =

Kid Cudi film discography
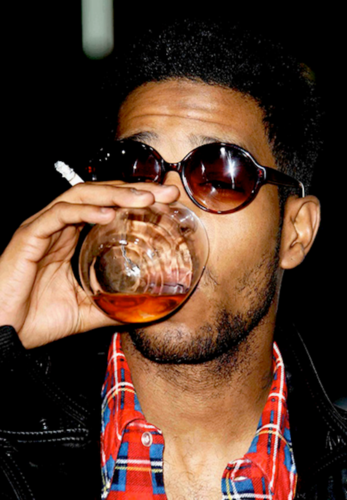
- Kid Cudi at The Hunger Games premiere in March 2012
- Music videos: 38
- Television: 21
- Films: 23

Kid Cudi is an American actor, producer, film composer, music video director and musician.

Having initially majored in film at the University of Toledo, before dropping out to pursue a career in music, Cudi would venture into acting in 2009, when he was cast in the HBO series How to Make It in America. Cudi would continue to hone his acting skills, starring alongside fellow American rapper Cage, in Maniac (2011), a short horror film directed by American actor Shia LaBeouf. Cudi went on to appear in several feature films, including Goodbye World (2013), Need for Speed (2014), Entourage (2015), Bill & Ted Face the Music (2020), and Don't Look Up (2021). In addition, he has made appearances on television shows such as One Tree Hill, The Cleveland Show, Brooklyn Nine-Nine, and Westworld. In 2015, he was the bandleader on the IFC series Comedy Bang! Bang! and in 2020 starred in the TV drama We Are Who We Are.

In 2020, Cudi launched production company Mad Solar, which went on to produce A Man Named Scott (2021), a documentary storying Cudi's musical career, as well as Cudi's Netflix animated special Entergalactic (2022), which Cudi co-created alongside fellow American producer Kenya Barris. In 2021, Cudi was credited as an executive producer on the award-winning film Malcolm & Marie. Mad Solar would also produce the critically acclaimed horror X (2022), which Cudi starred in, and its prequel Pearl (2022) and sequel MaXXXine (2024).

In March 2022, Cudi revealed he would be making his feature directorial debut with the Netflix film, Teddy, a project he’s also written and in which he’ll star. Cudi announced the news in a social media post, noting that he’d been working on the project since 2013. Fellow American musicians Jay-Z and Jeymes Samuel would serve as executives on the film, which was also produced by Bron Studios and Cudi's Mad Solar banner. Mad Solar is also set to produce a film adaptation of the coming-of-age campus novel Real Life, with Cudi set to star.

== Film ==
Key
| † | Denotes productions that have not yet been released |

Kid Cudi's film credits
| Year | Title | Role | Notes | Ref(s) |
|---|---|---|---|---|
| 2010 | The Journey of Mr. Rager | Himself | Mini-documentary; packaged alongside the deluxe edition of Man on the Moon II | |
| 2011 | Maniac | Twisted Killer | Short film; also screenwriter, composer | |
| 2012 | Cruel Summer | Rafi | Short film | |
| 2013 | Goodbye World | Lev Berkowitz | | |
| 2013 | Tacoma | Yanni | | |
| 2014 | Need for Speed | Sergeant Benny "Maverick" Jackson | Feature film debut | |
| 2014 | The Ever After | Scott | | |
| 2014 | Two Night Stand | Cedric | | |
| 2015 | Entourage | Allen | | |
| 2015 | Meadowland | Jason | | |
| 2015 | James White | Nick | Also composer | |
| 2017 | Vincent N Roxxy | Suga | | |
| 2017 | Killing Hasselhoff | Himself | | |
| 2018 | The After Party | William | Also composer | |
| 2019 | Drunk Parents | Scottie Tow Driver | | |
| 2019 | Jexi | Himself | | |
| 2020 | Bill & Ted Face the Music | Himself | | |
| 2021 | Malcolm & Marie | —N/a | Executive producer | |
| 2021 | Crisis | Ben Walker | | |
| 2021 | A Man Named Scott | Himself | Documentary film | |
| 2021 | Don't Look Up | DJ Chello | | |
| 2022 | X | Jackson Hollis | Also executive producer | |
| 2022 | Pearl | —N/a | Executive producer | |
| 2023 | House Party | Himself | | |
| 2023 | Parachute | Justin | | |
| 2023 | Crater | Michael Channing | | |
| 2023 | Trolls Band Together | Clay (voice) | | |
| 2023 | Silent Night | Dennis Vassel | | |
| 2024 | MaXXXine | —N/a | Executive producer | |
| 2024 | Trap | The Thinker | | |
| 2025 | Neverland | Vampire | Also writer | |
| 2025 | Happy Gilmore 2 | FBI agent | | |
| 2026 | Pathetic Fallacy | Asher | Also executive producer and additional composer | |
| 2027 | Doe † | Doe | Post-production; also director, writer and executive producer | |
| TBA | Slime † | Glenn (voice) | In production | |
| TBA | Wrong Number † | Ibn | In production; also director, writer and executive producer | |
| TBA | Jean † | Jean-Michel Basquiat | In production; also director and writer | |

== Television ==
Kid Cudi's television credits
| Year | Title | Role | Notes | Ref(s) | |
|---|---|---|---|---|---|
| 2010 | One Tree Hill | Himself | Notes | Ref(s) | Episode: "Lists, Plans"; performed "Erase Me" |
| 2010–2011 | How to Make It in America | Domingo Dean | Main cast; 16 episodes | | |
| 2013 | The Cleveland Show | Devon (voice) | Episode: "Brownsized" | | |
| 2013 | Brooklyn Nine-Nine | Dustin Whitman | Episode: "48 Hours" | | |
| 2014 | Scorpion | Peyton Temple | Episode: "Risky Business" | | |
| 2015 | Comedy Bang! Bang! | Himself | Co-host/bandleader; 21 episodes | | |
| 2019 | Creepshow | Doc Kessler | Episode: "Bad Wolf Down" | | |
| 2020 | Westworld | Francis | Three episodes | | |
| 2020 | We Are Who We Are | Richard Poythress | Main cast, miniseries | | |
| 2022 | Entergalactic | Jabari (voice) | Television special; Also executive producer, screenwriter, and composer | | |
| 2023 | Young Love | Stephen (voice) | Animated series | | |
| 2024 | Knuckles | Agent Mason | Miniseries | | |

=== Celebrity/musical guest ===
Kid Cudi's television credits
| Year | Title | Notes | Ref(s) | |
|---|---|---|---|---|
| 2009 | Dogg After Dark | Notes | Ref(s) | Celebrity guest; performed "Day n Nite" |
| 2009 | 106 & Park | Celebrity guest; performed a cappella version of "Soundtrack 2 My Life" | | |
| 2009 | Last Call with Carson Daly | Musical guest; performed "Dat New New", "Sky Might Fall" and "Day n Nite" | | |
| 2009 | It's On with Alexa Chung | Two episodes; musical guest; performed "Make Her Say" and "Day n Nite" | | |
| 2009 | Late Show with David Letterman | Musical guest; performed "Pursuit of Happiness" | | |
| 2010 | Late Night with Jimmy Fallon | Musical guest; performed "Maniac" | | |
| 2010 | Conan | November 28 episode; performed "REVOFEV" | | |
| 2011 | Conan | Episode: "The Day the Proofradar Quit" | | |
| 2013 | Jimmy Kimmel Live! | Musical guest, performed "Immortal" | | |
| 2014 | The Arsenio Hall Show | Musical guest, performed "Internal Bleeding" | | |
| 2014 | Chelsea Lately | Celebrity guest | | |
| 2014 | Henry Danger | Trevor (guest role) | Not shown | |
| 2016 | Talking Dead | Episode: "Knots Untie" | | |
| 2017 | The Tonight Show Starring Jimmy Fallon | Musical guest; performed "Kitchen" | | |
| 2018 | Saturday Night Live | Cameo appearance, musical guest; performed "Ghost Town" with Kanye West and 070 Shake | | |
| 2018 | Red Table Talk | Episode: "Confronting Mental Illness" | | |
| 2021 | Saturday Night Live | Musical guest; performed "Tequila Shots" and "Sad People" | | |
| 2021 | 2021 NFL draft | Narrator | | |
| 2021 | Prime Day Show | Musical | | |
| 2021 | The Shop: Uninterrupted | Episode 10; Celebrity guest | | |
| 2021 | Songwriter's Roundtable | Celebrity guest | | |
| 2021 | The Voice | Musical guest; performed "Just Look Up" with Ariana Grande | | |
| 2021 | The Tonight Show Starring Jimmy Fallon | Celebrity guest | | |
| 2022 | Late Night with Seth Meyers | Celebrity guest | | |
| 2022 | 2022 Kids' Choice Awards | Performed a medley of "Stars in the Sky" and "Pursuit of Happiness" | | |
| 2022 | The Tonight Show Starring Jimmy Fallon | Celebrity/musical guest; performed "Willing to Trust" alongside Ty Dolla Sign | | |

== Music videos ==
=== As lead artist ===
List of music videos as lead artist, showing year released and directors
| Title | Year | Director(s) |
|---|---|---|
| "Heaven at Nite" | 2009 | Va$htie |
| "Day 'n' Nite" (Crookers Remix) (version 1) | 2009 | —N/a |
| "Day 'n' Nite" | 2009 | So Me |
| "Day 'n' Nite" (Crookers Remix) (version 2) | 2009 | BBGun |
| "Make Her Say" (featuring Kanye West and Common) | 2009 | Nez Khammal |
| "Pursuit of Happiness" (version 1) (featuring MGMT and Ratatat) | 2009 | Brody Baker |
| "Cudderisback" | 2010 | Jason Goldwatch |
| "Pursuit of Happiness" (version 2) (featuring MGMT and Ratatat) | 2010 | Megaforce |
| "All Summer" (with Rostam Batmanglij and Bethany Cosentino) | 2010 | Psyop |
| "Soundtrack 2 My Life" | 2010 | Jason Goldwatch |
| "Erase Me" (featuring Kanye West) | 2010 | Jason Goldwatch |
| "Mojo So Dope" | 2010 | Jason Goldwatch |
| "Marijuana" | 2011 | Shia LaBeouf |
| "No One Believes Me" | 2011 | Craig Gillespie |
| "Mr. Rager" | 2011 | Jérémie Rozan |
| "Just What I Am" (featuring King Chip) | 2012 | Kid Cudi |
| "King Wizard" | 2012 | Kid Cudi |
| "Frequency" | 2016 | Kid Cudi |
| "Surfin'" | 2016 | Kid Cudi |
| "She Knows This" | 2020 | Nabil Elderkin |
| "Heaven on Earth" | 2020 | Nabil Elderkin |
| "Solo Dolo, Pt. III" | 2021 | Jason Goldwatch |
| "Want It Bad" (with Nigo) | 2022 | Harrison Boyce |
| "Stars in the Sky" | 2022 | William Lebeda |
| "Talk About Me" (with Dot da Genius, JID and Denzel Curry) | 2022 | Cole Bennett |
| "Guitar in My Room" (with Lil Durk and Lyrical Lemonade) | 2023 | Cole Bennett |
| "Ill What I Bleed" | 2023 | Kid Cudi, Jason Goldwatch |
| "Superboy" | 2024 | Kid Cudi, Jason Goldwatch |
| "Grave" | 2025 | Samuel Bayer |

=== As featured artist ===
List of music videos as featured artist, showing year released and directors
| Title | Year | Director(s) |
|---|---|---|
| "Welcome to Heartbreak" (Kanye West featuring Kid Cudi) | 2009 | Nabil Elderkin |
| "She Came Along" (Sharam featuring Kid Cudi) | 2009 | Sharam |
| "Buggin Out '09" (Consequence featuring Kid Cudi) | 2009 | Rik Cordero |
| "Did It Again" (Remix) (Shakira featuring Kid Cudi) | 2009 | Sophie Muller |
| "Memories" (David Guetta featuring Kid Cudi) | 2010 | Keith Schofield |
| "Symphonies" (Remix) (Dan Black featuring Kid Cudi) | 2010 | Chic & Artistic |
| "That Tree" (Snoop Dogg featuring Kid Cudi) | 2010 | Erick Peyton, VisualCreatures |
| "All of the Lights" (Kanye West featuring Rihanna and Kid Cudi) | 2010 | Hype Williams |
| "Run" (The Knux featuring Kid Cudi) | 2011 | BBGun |
| "Cudi the Kid" (Steve Aoki featuring Kid Cudi and Travis Barker) | 2012 | Jam Sutton |
| "Old School Caddy" (Hit-Boy featuring Kid Cudi) | 2012 | Topshelf Junior |
| "Dangerous" (Schoolboy Q featuring Kid Cudi) | 2019 | Alexandre Moors |
| "M3tamorphosis" (Playboi Carti featuring Kid Cudi) | 2020 | Nico Ballesteros |
| "Moon Man" (Young Thug featuring Strick and Kid Cudi) | 2021 | Zachary Bailey |

=== Cameo appearances ===
List of cameo appearances in music videos, showing year released and directors
| Title | Year | Director(s) |
|---|---|---|
| "T.O.N.Y." (Solange Knowles) | 2009 | Va$htie |
| "I Gotta Feeling" (The Black Eyed Peas) | 2009 | Ben Mor |
| "My Last" (Big Sean featuring Chris Brown) | 2011 | Taj Stansberry |
| "Mercy" (Kanye West, Big Sean, Pusha T and 2 Chainz) | 2012 | Nabil Elderkin |
| "Arya" (Nigo and ASAP Rocky) | 2022 | Awge |

== See also ==
- Kid Cudi's acting career
- Kid Cudi discography
- Mad Solar
