= Passion, Pain & Demon Slayin' =

Studio album by Kid Cudi
- Released: December 16, 2016
- Studios: Ameraycan (North Hollywood) (Note: Except track 5); Capitol (Hollywood) (Note: Strings on tracks 7, 10 and 14–16); Chalice (Los Angeles) (Note: Tracks 1, 5, 9 and 19); Conway (Hollywood) (Note: Track 19); EastWest (Hollywood) (Note: Track 9)
- Genre: Hip hop
- Length: 86:52
- Labels: Wicked Awesome; Republic
- Producers: Anthony Kilhoffer; Dot da Genius; Idle; J Gramm; Kid Cudi; Mike Dean; Mike Will Made It; Plain Pat; Pharrell Williams

Kid Cudi chronology
Speedin' Bullet 2 Heaven (2015)	Passion, Pain & Demon Slayin' (2016)	Kids See Ghosts (2018)

Singles from Passion, Pain & Demon Slayin'
- 1. "Frequency" Released: September 30, 2016; 2. "Surfin'" Released: September 30, 2016

Passion, Pain & Demon Slayin' is the sixth studio album by American rapper Kid Cudi. The album was released on December 16, 2016, through Wicked Awesome Records and Republic Records. It succeeds Cudi's alternative rock album Speedin' Bullet 2 Heaven (2015). The album features guest appearances from André 3000 (under his real name André Benjamin), Pharrell Williams, Travis Scott and Willow Smith. The production on the album was handled by Cudi himself, alongside Plain Pat, Mike Dean, Dot da Genius, Anthony Kilhoffer, Mike Will Made It and Pharrell Williams, among others.

Passion, Pain & Demon Slayin' was supported by two singles: "Frequency" and "Surfin'". The album received generally positive reviews from critics, debuting at number 11 on the US Billboard 200, moving 49,000 units in its first week.

== Background ==
On May 11, 2016, amidst rumors that he was planning to release Man on the Moon III, Cudi revealed the title of his sixth solo album would be Passion, Pain & Demon Slayin', through Instagram. On June 1, 2016, Cudi announced that he would release two albums in 2016, one for the summer and one set for fall. In September 2016, Cudi revealed Passion, Pain & Demon Slayin' would be a double disc album. On September 26, Cudi unveiled the album's track-listing, which revealed that similar to his Man on the Moon album series, the Passion, Pain & Demon Slayin' track-list is split into acts. In October 2016, in the weeks leading up to the album's release, Cudi revealed on his Facebook page that he had checked himself into rehabilitation for depression and suicidal urges. In December 2022, Cudi would later reveal Passion, Pain & Demon Slayin' was originally going to be released as Man on the Moon III, but opted not to because he wanted to "be in a better place" when he ultimately released the final installment of his trilogy.

== Recording and production ==
On May 1, 2016, American drummer Travis Barker of Blink-182, revealed he's had recording sessions with Cudi and Atlanta-based rapper André 3000. On June 1, 2016, Cudi revealed on Twitter that Houston-based rapper Travis Scott, was the only featured artist on the album at the moment; Cudi also previewed a video of them in the studio with a new song in the background, via Snapchat. It was also confirmed on June 3, that Cudi's longtime producer Dot da Genius, would also be involved with the album, after Cudi posted a video of them in the studio on Snapchat. On June 9, Cudi released a video of child actress and singer Willow Smith, singing in a recording booth, with the caption "Passion, Pain & Demon Slayin'". On June 29, Cudi teased a Pharrell Williams collaboration, when he tweeted: "Got some magic from Pharrell lastnite. New collabs, new energy, new frequency."

== Release and promotion ==
Kid Cudi
(@KidCudi)
tweeted:

You will have this album this month in your hearts and your hands. New chapter, new energy, new levels.

September 6, 2016

After releasing an alternative rock solo album, where he sang and played instruments throughout the album, Kid Cudi returned to rapping on March 25, 2016, with the song "The Frequency". The song, which was produced by Cudi's longtime collaborators Mike Dean and Plain Pat, was called a "return to form" for Kid Cudi. On April 15, 2016, Cudi released a song titled "All In", produced by Atlanta-based multi-platinum producer, Mike Will Made It. On April 22, 2016, Kid Cudi announced he would be releasing a new studio album, set for a summer release. In May, a few hours following the announcement of the album's title, Cudi released a snippet of a song from the album, produced by himself and Mike Dean, which he shared via Instagram.

On June 24, 2016, Kid Cudi released a song, titled "Goodbye". The song, produced by Cudi and Dot da Genius (collectively known as WZRD), samples dialogue by Tupac Shakur from the 1992 film Juice, as well as vocals by English rock band Pink Floyd from their 1979 song "Goodbye Cruel World". On August 15, 2016, Cudi announced he had completed working on the album and would soon be unveiling the release date. In August 2016, while performing at the Trillectro Music Festival, Cudi debuted a new song produced by Pharrell Williams. In September 2016, Cudi revealed the album would be a double disc album and that he had plans to release the album that month.

On September 26, 2016, Cudi revealed the album's track-listing via his Twitter account. Later that day, Cudi announced the album's release date and unveiled the cover art. Hours before the album's release, Cudi revealed the album had been postponed "due to some minor sample clearance issues still being finalized" and announced he would be officially releasing two singles, "Frequency" and "Surfin'" featuring Pharrell Williams, due to the delay. On December 1, 2016, the album was made available for pre-order on the iTunes Store, with "Baptized in Fire" featuring Travis Scott, as the "instant gratification track".

On March 1, 2017, Kid Cudi performed the song "Kitchen", with a string orchestra, live on The Tonight Show Starring Jimmy Fallon. On August 15, 2017, Cudi announced a national concert tour by the name of Passion, Pain & Demon Slayin' Tour; with the first date on September 30 in Philadelphia, Pennsylvania.

=== Singles ===
On September 30, 2016, Kid Cudi released "Frequency" and "Surfin'" featuring Pharrell Williams, via digital distribution. The music video for "Frequency", which was directed by Kid Cudi himself, was released on October 13, 2016. The music video for "Surfin'", also directed by Cudi, later followed on October 31, 2016, featuring cameo appearances from Jaden Smith, Willow Smith, King Chip, ASAP Nast and ASAP Rocky, among others.

== Critical reception ==
Passion, Pain & Demon Slayin' ratings
Aggregate scores
Source	Rating
AnyDecentMusic?	6.6/10
Metacritic	70/100
Review scores
Source	Rating
AllMusic	4/5 stars
Consequence	C+
Drowned in Sound	7/10
Exclaim!	8/10
HipHopDX	3.8/5
The Observer	3/5 stars
Pitchfork	6.7/10
PopMatters	6/10
USA Today	2.5/4 stars
XXL	3/5

Passion, Pain & Demon Slayin' was met with generally positive reviews. At Metacritic, which assigns a normalized rating out of 100 to reviews from professional publications, the album received an average score of 70, based on 11 reviews. Aggregator AnyDecentMusic? gave it 6.6 out of 10, based on their assessment of the critical consensus.

Neil Yeung of AllMusic commented that Passion, Pain & Demon Slayin' "breathes gravitas into the Kid Cudi discography, realigning his trajectory and hinting at hope, possibility, and, most importantly, recovery". Chris Mench of Complex stated that Cudi has managed to "recapture the heart of his music, mixing confessional raps with cosmic hums and unique production. It's not perfect, but it finally feels like we have the Cudi we fell in love with when we first heard him". Matthew Strauss of Pitchfork, while noting the long length and redundancy, commented that "Cudi is as focused as he's been since 2010's Man on the Moon II: The Legend of Mr. Rager", as well as praising the production. Kellan Miller of Drowned in Sound said, "It is definitely a record that demands repeated attention, as a cursory listen will not unveil all its hidden gems. It's instantly accessible than his previous records [sic], but when Cudi is on his game he reaps unignorable rewards". Anya Zoledziowski of Exclaim! said, "Not only is Passion, Pain & Demon Slayin' loaded with hits, but it also draws attention to Cudi's renewed sense of self. Cudi has finally slayed his demons, and he sounds all the better for it".

Alex Bell of HipHopDX said, "Weighing in at 19 tracks and 86 minutes, PP&DS sprawls to a fault, but it sticks true to its branding". Karas Lamb of Consequence said, "Passion, Pain & Demon Slayin' seems concerned with little more than keeping up appearances. Hopefully, the high points of the album are a proper barometer, and Kid Cudi's next destination is a sight better than this". Bernadette McNulty of The Observer said, "Pharrell Williams and André 3000 add support on this hefty but intriguingly experimental 19-track marathon, while Willow Smith adds weirdness to Mescudi's trademark humming on the dub hip-hop of "Rose Golden"". Tanner Smith of PopMatters said, "The consistent sound here isn't so much redundant as repetitive; it builds a world in a way that too few records do. It's not a particularly deep work—and it's certainly not as important as its maker implies. But if there is a deeper truth to be found, it's going to be in the album's texture which conjures a beautiful night where the streets are wet, and you might be sad, but not sad enough to go to bed just yet". Chris Gibbons of XXL said, "The album's biggest issue is its length. ... While the project is lengthy, it's just good to hear Kid Cudi sound like himself". XXL ranked Passion, Pain & Demon Slayin' among the best 50 hip hop projects of 2016.

== Commercial performance ==
In the United States, Passion, Pain & Demon Slayin' debuted at number 11 on the Billboard 200, with 49,000 album-equivalent units. It was the second best-selling digital album of the week, selling 24,000 digital copies. The album was also streamed 35 million times in the first week.

== Track listing ==
Act 1: Tuned
No.	Title	Writer(s)	Producer(s)	Length
1.	"Frequency"	Scott Mescudi; Patrick Reynolds; Mike Dean	Kid Cudi; Plain Pat; Dean	4:58
2.	"Swim in the Light"	Mescudi; Dean	Kid Cudi; Dean	4:29
3.	"Releaser"	Mescudi; Reynolds; Dean	Kid Cudi; Plain Pat; Dean	5:27
4.	"By Design" (featuring André Benjamin)	Mescudi; André Benjamin; Pharrell Williams; Reynolds	Williams; Plain Pat^{[a]}	4:17
5.	"All In"	Mescudi; Michael Williams II; Asheton Hogan	Mike Will Made It	4:10

Act 2: Prophecy
No.	Title	Writer(s)	Producer(s)	Length
6.	"ILLusions"	Mescudi; Dean	Dean	4:16
7.	"Rose Golden" (featuring Willow Smith)	Mescudi; Reynolds; Dean	Kid Cudi; Plain Pat; Dean	4:37
8.	"Baptized in Fire" (featuring Travis Scott)	Mescudi; Jacques Webster II; Dean; Reynolds; Mort Garson	Kid Cudi; Plain Pat; Dean	4:45
9.	"Flight at First Sight / Advanced" (featuring Pharrell Williams)	Mescudi; Williams	Williams	3:56
10.	"Does It"	Mescudi; André Patrick, Jr.; Anthony Kilhoffer	Kid Cudi; Idle; Kilhoffer	4:22

Act 3: Niveaux de l'Amour
No.	Title	Writer(s)	Producer(s)	Length
11.	"Dance 4 Eternity"	Mescudi; Reynolds	Kid Cudi; Plain Pat	4:43
12.	"Distant Fantasies"	Mescudi; Reynolds	Kid Cudi; Plain Pat	4:47
13.	"Wounds"	Mescudi; Julian Gramma; Kilhoffer	Kid Cudi; J Gramm; Kilhoffer	4:03
14.	"Mature Nature"	Mescudi; Reynolds	Kid Cudi; Plain Pat	3:55
15.	"Kitchen"	Mescudi; Reynolds; Oladipo Omishore	Kid Cudi; Dot da Genius; Plain Pat	4:28

Act 4: It's Bright and Heaven Is Warm
No.	Title	Writer(s)	Producer(s)	Length
16.	"Cosmic Warrior"	Mescudi; Omishore	Dot da Genius	4:00
17.	"The Guide" (featuring André Benjamin)	Mescudi; Benjamin; Omishore; Reynolds	Kid Cudi; Dot da Genius; Plain Pat	5:06
18.	"The Commander"	Mescudi; Reynolds; Dean	Kid Cudi; Plain Pat; Dean	4:16
19.	"Surfin'" (featuring Pharrell Williams)	Mescudi; Williams	Williams	6:15
Total length:				86:52

Notes

- ^{^[a]} signifies an additional producer
- "Releaser" features additional vocals by Vanessa Vasquez and background vocals by Kacy Hill
- "Kitchen" features background vocals by Jaden Smith

Sample credits

- "Baptized in Fire" contains elements of "Déjà Vu", as performed by Ataraxia and written by Mort Garson.
- "Flight at First Sight / Advanced" contains elements of "Campbell Soup Gospel! God is Mmmmmm Gooood!", as performed by Leslie Davis.
- "Distant Fantasies" contains elements of "Electronic Fields 27", as performed by Gerhard Trede Selection.

== Personnel ==
Credits adapted from the album's liner notes.

Musicians

- Danny Pravder – piano (3, 10)
- Alison Bjorkedal – harp (7, 10, 16)
- James A. McMillen – orchestration and arrangement (7, 10, 14–16), horn section orchestration and arrangement (19)
- Steven Velez – orchestration and arrangement (7, 10, 14–16), horn section orchestration and arrangement (19), horn section conducting (19), solo cello (3, 10)
- Idle Kid – programming (10)
- Dot da Genius – keyboards (11)
- Matthew Byas – additional drums (11)
- J Gramm – programming (13)
- Anthony Kilhoffer – programming (13)
- Mike Dean – additional keyboards (18)
- Brent Paschke – electric guitar (19)
- Dan Fornero – trumpets (19)
- Rob Schraer – trumpets (19)
- Alex Iles – trombone (19)
- Steve Trapani – bass trombone (19)
- Doug Tornquist – tuba (19)

Technical

- Tom Coyne – mastering
- Randy Merrill – mastering
- Anthony Kilhoffer – mixing (1–3, 5–8, 10–17), mix engineering (3, 6–8, 10, 11, 13, 14, 16, 17), recording (1, 3–19)
- Mick Guzauski – mixing (4, 9, 19)
- Thomas Cullison – mixing (18), recording (9, 19)
- Tom Kahre – recording (2, 3, 11), mix engineering (7)
- Mike Larson – recording (4, 9, 19)
- Adam Michalak – strings recording (7, 10, 14–16)
- David Kim – recording assistance (9, 19)
- Will Delaney – recording assistance (9)
- Keith Parry – recording assistance (9)
- Ben Sedano – recording assistance (19)
- Eric Eylands – recording assistance (19)

Artwork

- Ryan Rogers – design
- Pamela Littky – photography

== Charts ==
Chart performance for Passion, Pain & Demon Slayin'
Chart (2016–2017)	Peak position
Australian Albums (ARIA)	88
Canadian Albums (Billboard)	24
French Albums (SNEP)	119
New Zealand Heatseeker Albums (RMNZ)	1
UK R&B Albums (Official Charts)	24
US Billboard 200	11
US Top R&B/Hip-Hop Albums (Billboard)	5

== Release history ==
Release dates and formats for Passion, Pain & Demon Slayin'
Country	Date	Label(s)	Format(s)	Ref.
United States	December 16, 2016	Wicked Awesome; Republic	CD; digital download; streaming	
