= Kid Cudi =

American rapper (born 1984)

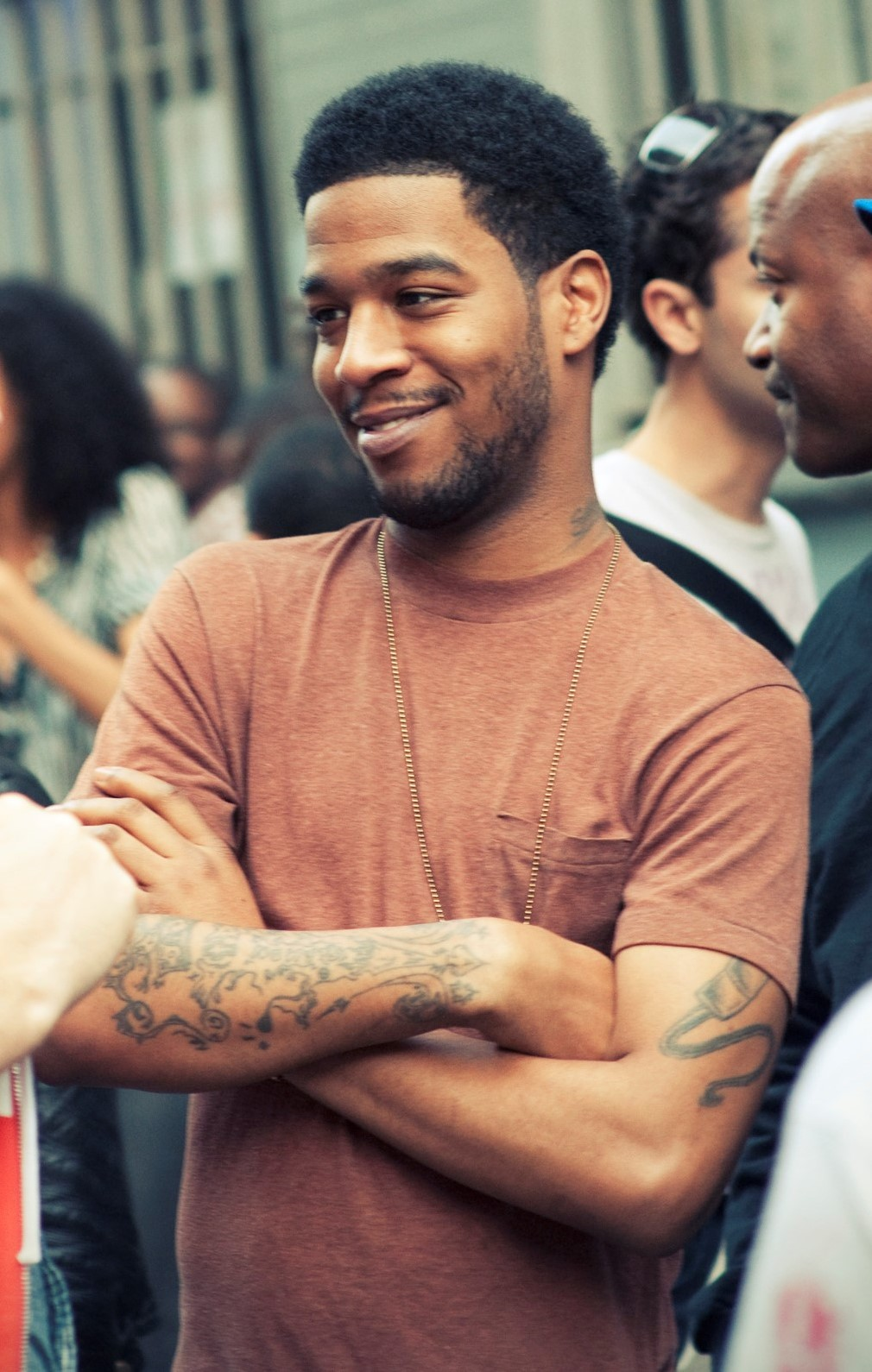
- Cudi in 2010
- Born: Scott Ramon Seguro Mescudi; January 30, 1984 (age 42); Cleveland, Ohio, U.S.
- Other names: Scotty Ramon; Mr. Rager
- Education: University of Toledo (no degree)
- Occupations: Rapper; singer; songwriter; record producer; actor; fashion designer
- Years active: 2003–present
- Agent: Dennis Cummings
- Works: Discography; filmography; production; songs recorded; videography
- Title: Founder of Wicked Awesome Records and MOTR; Co-founder of Mad Solar; Co-founder and CCO of Encore Music Technologies
- Spouse: Lola Abecassis Sartore (m. 2025)
- Children: 1
- Awards: Full list
- Musical career
- Genres: Midwestern hip-hop; R&B; alternative hip-hop; pop rap; alternative rock; trip hop; neo-psychedelia
- Labels: Wicked Awesome; Republic; Dream On; GOOD; Fool's Gold; Universal Motown
- Member of: WZRD; The Scotts
- Formerly of: Kids See Ghosts
- Website: kidcudi.com

Scott Ramon Seguro Mescudi (/ˈmɛskʌdi/ MES-kuh-dee; born January 30, 1984), also known by his stage name Kid Cudi (/ˈkʌdi/ KUHD-ee; formerly stylized as KiD CuDi), is an American rapper, singer, songwriter, record producer, actor, and fashion designer. Born and raised in Cleveland, Cudi moved to New York City in pursuit of a musical career, where he first gained recognition for his song "Day 'n' Nite". Initially self-published on his MySpace page, the song became a hit online and led Cudi to work with producers Plain Pat and Emile Haynie to record his first full-length project, a mixtape titled A Kid Named Cudi (2008). Its release helped Cudi rise to prominence and establish a fanbase, catching the attention of rapper Kanye West—who signed Cudi to his GOOD Music label by late 2008.

With "Day 'n' Nite" issued as its lead single, his debut studio album, Man on the Moon: The End of Day (2009), was released to critical and commercial success. It received quadruple platinum certification by the Recording Industry Association of America (RIAA) and spawned two hit singles: "Make Her Say" (featuring Kanye West and Common) and the diamond-certified "Pursuit of Happiness" (featuring MGMT and Ratatat). His second album, Man on the Moon II: The Legend of Mr. Rager (2010), was met with continued success; it received platinum certification and spawned the singles "Erase Me" (featuring Kanye West) and "Mr. Rager". Cudi formed the rock band WZRD with long-time collaborator and producer Dot da Genius; their eponymous debut album (2012) debuted atop the Billboard Top Rock Albums chart.

His self-produced third album, Indicud (2013) peaked at number two on the Billboard 200, was led by the platinum-certified single "Just What I Am" (featuring King Chip), and served as his final release with GOOD Music. It was followed by the tepidly-received experimental albums, Satellite Flight: The Journey to Mother Moon (2014) and Speedin' Bullet 2 Heaven (2015). His sixth album, Passion, Pain & Demon Slayin' (2016) saw an improvement in critical reception and was supported by the single "Surfin'" (featuring Pharrell Williams). Cudi formed the duo Kids See Ghosts with former label boss West in 2018; they released a self-titled collaborative album in June of that year, which was met with critical acclaim. His 2020 single, "The Scotts" (with Travis Scott), became his first song to peak atop the Billboard Hot 100, foreseeing the release of his seventh album, Man on the Moon III: The Chosen (2020) to commercial resurgence and critical praise. Cudi released his eighth album, Entergalactic (2022) to coincide with his adult animated TV special Entergalactic; both of which were critically praised. His ninth and tenth albums, the trap-inspired Insano (2024) and Insano (Nitro Mega) (2024), followed thereafter. In August 2025, he released the pop album Free.

Outside of recording, Cudi has launched his own vanity labels: the now-defunct Dream On, and his label imprint since 2011, Wicked Awesome Records. Cudi ventured into acting with the HBO series How to Make It in America in 2010, and has appeared in the films Goodbye World (2013), Need for Speed (2014), Entourage (2015), Bill & Ted Face the Music (2020), Don't Look Up (2021), and X (2022). In 2015, he starred as a bandleader in the IFC series Comedy Bang! Bang!. He played a dramatic role in the HBO mini-series We Are Who We Are in 2020. That same year, he launched the production company Mad Solar; its first release was the documentary A Man Named Scott (2021), which chronicled Cudi's career and upbringing. In fashion and modeling, Cudi has partnered with Giuseppe Zanotti, Virgil Abloh, Bape, Coach, Adidas, Calvin Klein, and Levi's on campaigns before launching his own clothing line in 2022.

Cudi has been recognized as an influence on contemporary hip-hop and alternative acts. His lyrics are often autobiographical, describing childhood experiences of depression, loneliness and alienation; his struggle with drugs into adulthood and themes of spirituality, heartbreak, dissipation and celebration. Much of his impact stems from his ability to display vulnerability and address mental health. He is noted for his experimental nature, combining psychedelia, R&B, electronica, synthpop, dance, house, punk and indie rock in his music. Cudi has sold over 22 million units domestically and won two Grammy Awards. He has worked with artists spanning numerous genres, including Jay-Z, The Weeknd, Drake, Eminem, Kendrick Lamar, David Guetta, Shakira, Ariana Grande, and Michael Bolton.

== Early life ==
Kid Cudi was born as Scott Ramon Seguro Mescudi in Cleveland, Ohio, on January 30, 1984. He grew up in Shaker Heights and Solon. He has two older brothers, Domingo and Dean, and an older sister, Maisha. His mother, Elsie Harriet (née Banks), is an African-American school choir teacher at Roxboro Middle School in Cleveland Heights. His father, Lindberg Styles Mescudi, was a house painter, substitute teacher, and World War II Air Force veteran of African-American and Mexican descent.

When Cudi was 11 years old, his father died of cancer; his death had a significant effect on Cudi's personality and music. Cudi attended Shaker Heights High School for two years before transferring to Solon High School. He was expelled from Solon for threatening to punch the principal, but later earned his GED. He studied film at the University of Toledo, but dropped out after a year. His subsequent plan to join the Navy did not pan out because of his juvenile police record.

== Musical career ==
=== 2003–2008: Beginnings in New York City and A Kid Named Cudi ===
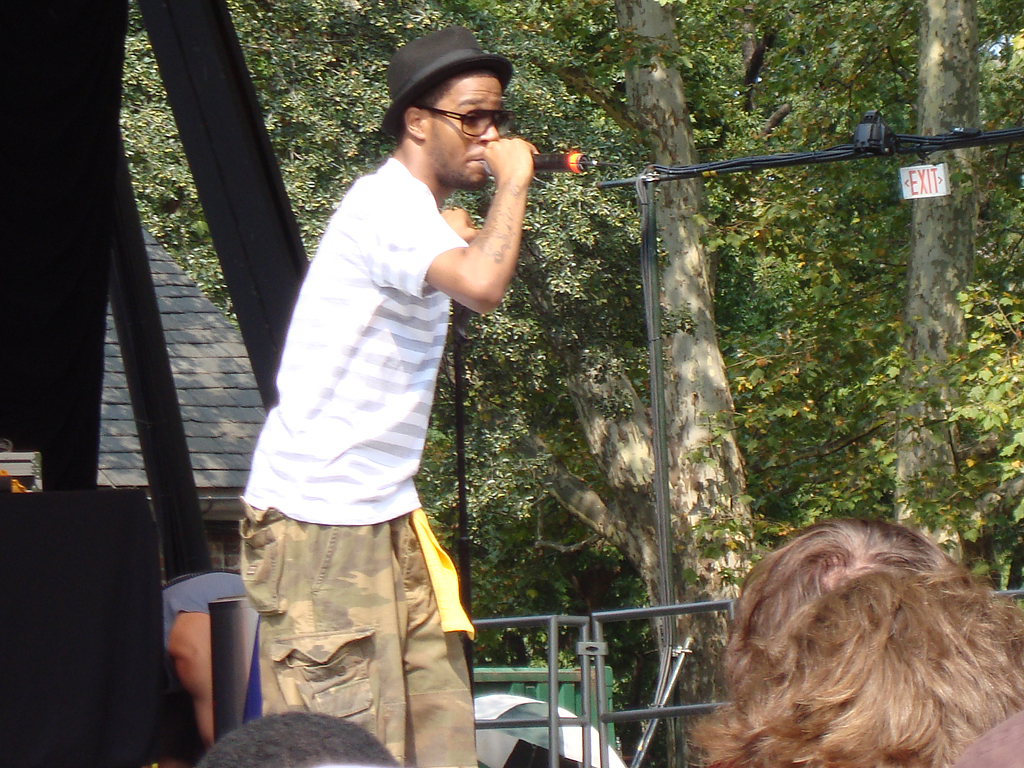
Kid Cudi performing at Summerstage in New York City in July 2008

Cudi first began rapping in 2003, towards the end of his time in high school, and was inspired by alternative hip-hop groups such as the Pharcyde and A Tribe Called Quest. He later moved to New York City to pursue a music career. After leaving Cleveland in 2005 with $500 and a demo tape, he moved in with his uncle, accomplished jazz drummer Kalil Madi, in the South Bronx. He worked at a couple of Manhattan clothing stores, before eventually sharing an apartment with friend and collaborator Dot da Genius in Brooklyn.

In 2006, Cudi ran into his future mentor, rapper and producer Kanye West, in a Virgin Megastore. He recounted in a 2009 SPIN interview, "I was looking at CDs, saw the gleam of a Jesus piece in the right side of my eye, looked up, and it was Kanye West." He introduced himself and offered West some of his music. Cudi later ran into West again while working at the BAPE store in New York, and recalled: "I remember Kanye coming in one time and I was helping him get a couple things. I forgot to take a sensor off of one of the jackets he bought and I had to run out the store to catch him before he left. Pretty funny me chasing after him in SoHo."

In 2007, Kid Cudi's song "Day 'n' Nite", began being featured on several music blogs, after having initially uploaded the song to his MySpace page. This early work caught the attention of West via his then-manager Plain Pat, subsequently leading West to sign Cudi to his GOOD Music imprint later that year. In July 2008, Kid Cudi released his first mixtape, A Kid Named Cudi (executive produced by Plain Pat and Emile Haynie), in collaboration with New York street-wear brand 10.Deep as a free download.

Kanye West first called upon Cudi to reference hooks for American rapper and mogul Jay-Z, and while in the studio Cudi and West went from working on The Blueprint 3 (2009) to West's R&B-esque 808s & Heartbreak (2008). Cudi's assistance on the latter includes co-writing credits or vocals on "Heartless", "Welcome to Heartbreak", "Paranoid", and "RoboCop". Kid Cudi was a prominent songwriter and featured artist on 808s & Heartbreak, with "Paranoid" and "Heartless" being released as singles, while "Welcome to Heartbreak" charted as an album cut and peaked at number 87 on the Pop 100.

Kid Cudi's first television appearance was at the 2008 MTV Video Music Awards, alongside Travis Barker and DJ AM. Cudi was promoted as an artist to watch for in media such as Rolling Stone, Vibe, The Source, XXL and BBC News's 2009 Sound of poll. MTV News reported on Cudi on a series of reports titled "MCs To Watch In 2009".

=== 2009–2010: Man on the Moon and Man on the Moon II ===
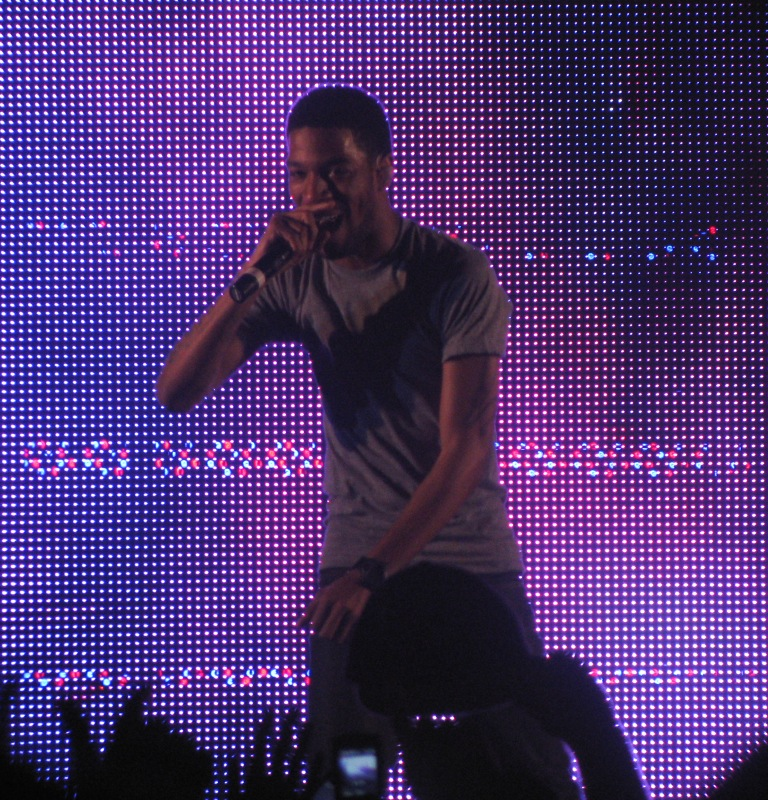
Cudi performing on MTV in August 2009

In late 2008, Cudi was revealed to be included in XXL's 2009 annual Freshman Class. He was featured on the cover alongside fellow up-and-coming rappers Asher Roth, Wale, B.o.B, Charles Hamilton, Cory Gunz, Blu, Mickey Factz, Ace Hood and Curren$y. On February 17, 2009, he appeared on Snoop Dogg's MTV talk show Dogg After Dark, performing "Day 'n' Nite" at the end of the show. Two days later on February 19, 2009, Cudi appeared on BET's 106 & Park, alongside Kanye West to debut the music video of "Day 'n' Nite". On February 25, 2009, Cudi self-leaked a teaser trailer for the upcoming Transformers: Revenge of the Fallen film, using his song "Sky Might Fall" in the background; later he posted that he made the trailer himself and was in talks to possibly making it official.

In February 2009, Kid Cudi also made a cameo appearance next to Solange in the video for her song "T.O.N.Y.". On March 16, 2009, Kid Cudi performed on mtvU's Spring Break special, and the following day he performed three songs on NBC's Last Call with Carson Daly. Cudi teamed up with partner and record producer Emile Haynie, to produce an exclusive single titled "Switchin Lanes", for the video game Midnight Club: Los Angeles, part of its "South Central Premium Upgrade" downloadable content (DLC), which came out March 19, 2009, for the PlayStation 3 and March 27, 2009, for the Xbox 360. He has also appeared as a musical guest on the Late Show with David Letterman and Jimmy Kimmel Live! In June 2009, he made a cameo in Black Eyed Peas' video for "I Gotta Feeling", alongside David Guetta, where the two met for the first time and subsequently recorded their international hit "Memories". In 2009, he had also been on two magazine covers, Complex (August/September 2009) and URB (August 2009).

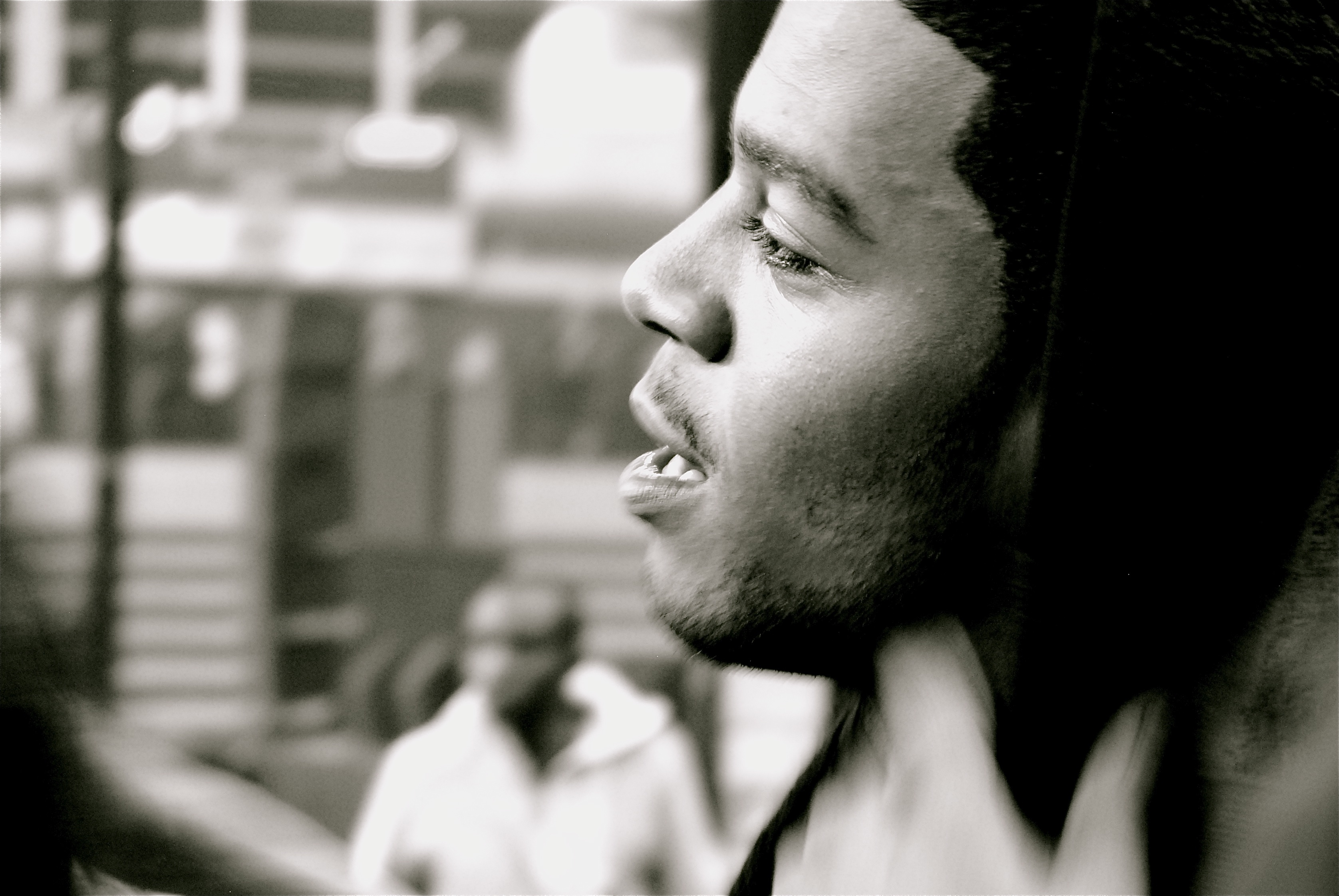
Cudi performing in September 2009

He revealed information about his future plans via his blog, saying that a possible collaborative album with Chip tha Ripper could be followed with a collaborative project with electronic rock duo Ratatat. On May 5, 2009 Iranian-American progressive house DJ Sharam, released "She Came Along", the lead single from his debut studio album, Get Wild (2009). The song, featuring Cudi, charted for 15 weeks on the Bulgarian Singles Top 40. It entered the chart on position 40 on week 30/2009, and its last appearance was on week 44/2009. It peaked at number 11, where it stayed for one week.

During the summer of 2009, Cudi joined fellow up-and-coming rappers Asher Roth and B.o.B, for 'The Great Hangover' concert tour. In late 2009, Kid Cudi was featured on the highly anticipated Jay-Z album The Blueprint 3, on the song "Already Home". On September 14, 2009, BET premiered their Rising Icons profile of Kid Cudi. During the 30 minute show Cudi performed "CuDi Zone", "Mr. Solo Dolo", "Day 'n' Nite" and "Make Her Say". Cudi also discussed his childhood, his move to New York to begin his career as an artist and more.

Cudi's debut album Man on the Moon: The End of Day, was released on Universal Motown Records on September 15, 2009 and sold 104,419 copies in the first week and charted at number four. The album's lead single "Day 'n' Nite", Kid Cudi's greatest commercial success thus far, charted well in both the U.S. and in Europe. The second single released was "Make Her Say" (originally titled "I Poke Her Face"), which features a sample from Lady Gaga's hit single "Poker Face" and performances by Kanye West and Common. Common was also featured throughout the album, as the narrator.

In September 2009, Cudi co-headlined 50 Cent's "50 Fest" concert, along with fellow American rapper Wale. In a late 2009 interview, Cudi announced that the follow-up to his debut album would be a compilation album entitled Cudder and the Revolution of Evolution, which would have many collaborations. He stated he had already recorded songs with Snoop Dogg, Travis Barker, Clipse, Cage and Pharrell, and would also like to work with Drake, Green Day, Kings of Leon, Robin Thicke, the Killers and the Postal Service on the album. It was also rumored that Man on the Moon: The End of Day was followed up by a sequel titled Man on the Moon: The Ghost in the Machine and that the Man on the Moon series would be a trilogy. Kid Cudi was nominated for three 2010 Grammy Awards, for his singles "Day 'n' Nite" and "Make Her Say".

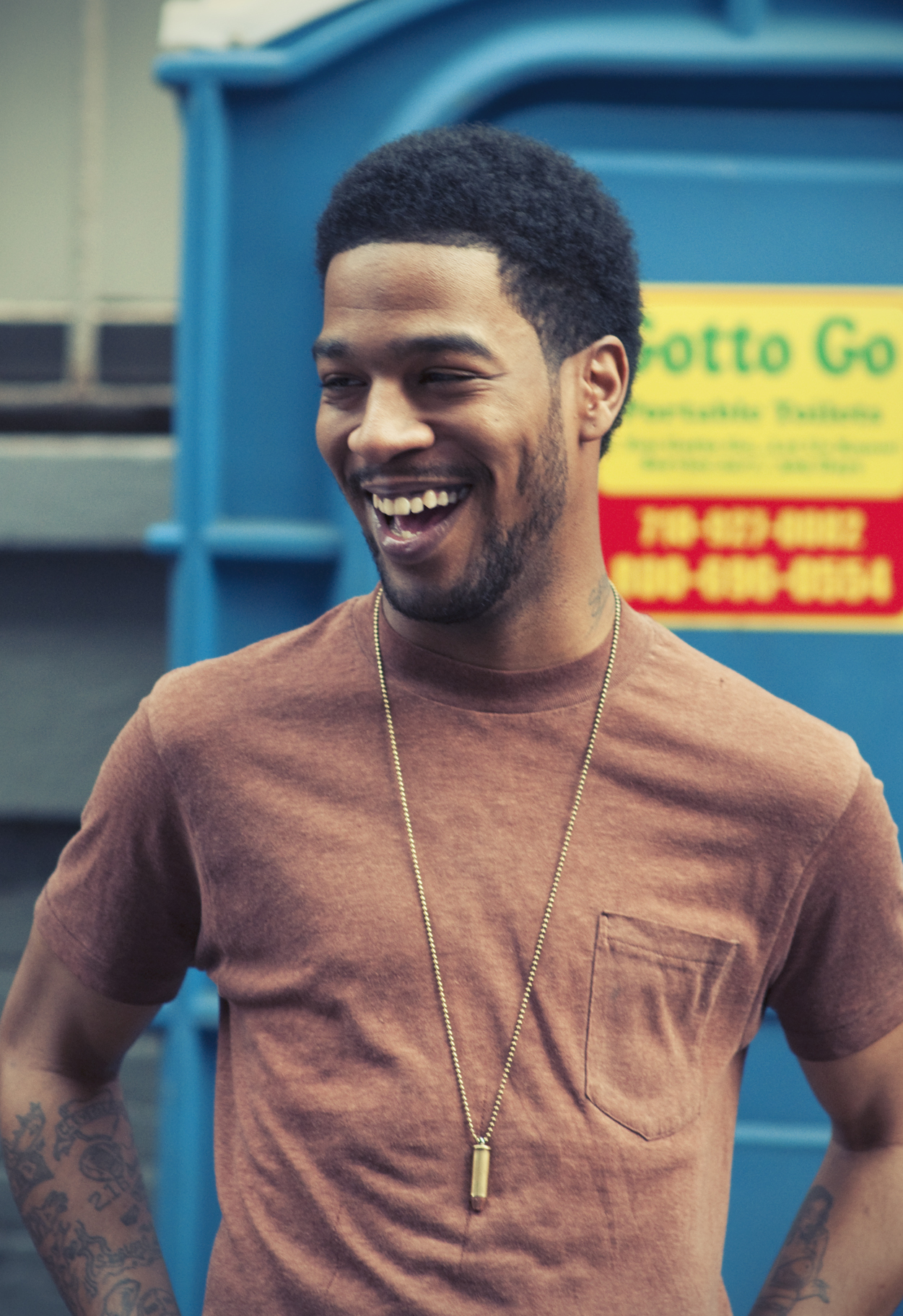
Cudi in April 2010

In January 2010, Cudi released Man on the Moon: The End of Day's third and final single "Pursuit of Happiness", which was eventually certified platinum by the RIAA. In 2010, Cudi was featured on Snoop Dogg's re-release of Malice n Wonderland, titled More Malice, on the lead single "That Tree". Cudi later teamed up with independent artist Johnny Polygon, to remix Polygon's "The Riot Song", which appears on his mixtape Rebel Without Applause (2010). He was also invited to be a vocalist for the remake of the charity single "We Are the World" for its 25th anniversary to benefit Haiti after the earthquake.

On April 20, 2010, Kid Cudi announced that the name of his second album would not be Cudder and the Revolution of Evolution, but a direct sequel to his first, titled Man on the Moon II: The Legend of Mr. Rager.

On June 11, 2010, Kid Cudi was arrested in the Chelsea neighborhood of the Manhattan borough in New York City and charged with felony criminal mischief and possession of a controlled substance. Despite his arrest, he was released and made it to Manchester, Tennessee in time to play at Bonnaroo.

In May 2010, American shoe company Converse, launched "You're It", a campaign which highlighted 23 artists from around the world in a series of web shorts. In his clip, Cudi returned Cleveland, Ohio. In June 2010, Converse teamed up Cudi, alongside Vampire Weekend's Rostam Batmanglij and Best Coast's Bethany Cosentino, to produce the song titled "All Summer". In addition to collaborating on the track, each of the artists also participated in the creation of the music video, which was released later that summer.

The lead single from Cudi's second studio album, titled "Erase Me", features Kanye West and was produced by Jim Jonsin. The song debuted on a Cleveland radio station June 30, 2010, and was officially released to Rhythm/Crossover radio on August 17, 2010. The title-track "Mr. Rager", was released as the album's second single, shortly before the album's release. The album, released November 9, 2010, debuted at number three on the US Billboard 200 chart, with first-week sales of 169,000 copies. In its second week it crossed the 200,000 sales mark.

In 2010, Kid Cudi appeared on several songs for his mentor Kanye West's weekly free music giveaway GOOD Fridays; namely "Good Friday", "Christian Dior Denim Flow" and "The Joy", the latter of which later became a bonus track on the Jay-Z and Kanye West collaborative album Watch the Throne (2011).

=== 2011–2012: New direction with WZRD and Wicked Awesome ===
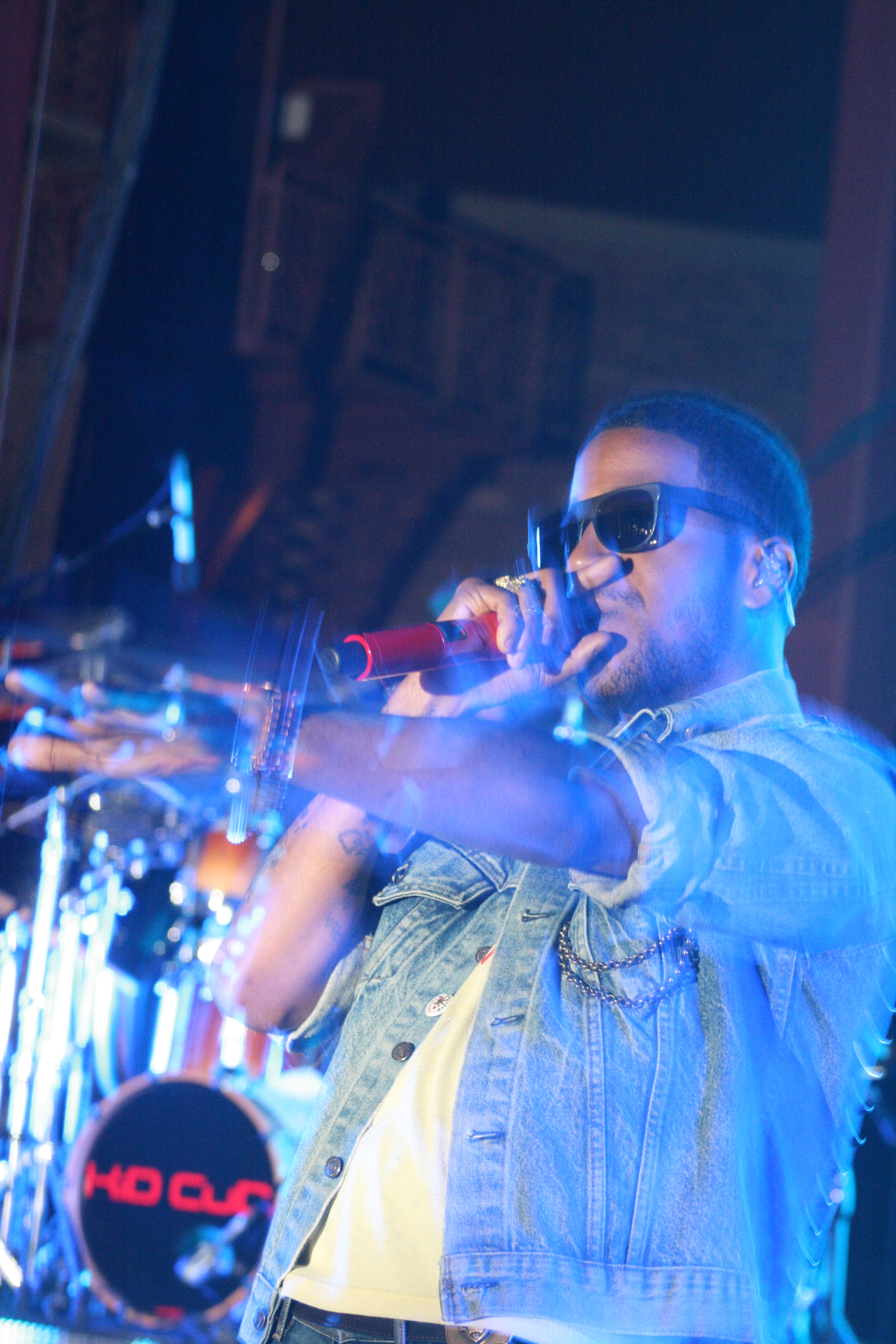
Cudi performing at the 2011 Global Dance Festival at Red Rocks Amphitheatre in Colorado

In October 2010, Cudi had announced that he would be forming a rock band with frequent collaborator Dot da Genius, tentatively called Wizard. In early 2011, he announced that he would be releasing a mixtape titled A Man Named Scott, reminiscent of his A Kid Named Cudi title, prior to the rock album. On February 26, 2011, Cudi took to his Twitter account to announce that Dream On, the record label he launched in 2009 with partners Patrick "Plain Pat" Reynolds and producer Emile Haynie, has been dissolved. However, in an interview with Complex Magazine Cudi explained they were all still on good terms: "I wanted to try something new, and I wanted to take control of things myself. Those are still my guys, Pat and Emile, and I'm still going to work with them in the future. When we start working on Man on the Moon III I'll be calling them up to see if they want to be a part of it. I know Emile is definitely down. We had an issue, but we're men and we were able to figure it out and move forward. There's no hard feelings."

In March 2011, Cudi announced that a music video for "Marijuana" would be released in the spring, followed by a music video for "Mr. Rager" in the summer, then he would release a short film, directed by Shia LaBeouf, inspired by his song "Maniac", with Cage, in October 2011. In April 2011, while performing at New York City's Roseland Ballroom Kid Cudi announced he was launching his own record label. The new label, which he will be releasing his third studio album on is called Wicked Awesome Records. He also renamed his band on the same occasion to 2 Be Continuum, renaming it from the original Wizard. Kid Cudi explained his reasoning saying: "I needed something more original, something different, but it's still wizardry at its finest." In 2011, Cudi landed a songwriting placement on English singer Natalia Kills' debut album Perfectionist, for the song "Free".

On August 12, 2011, Kid Cudi released the music video for "No One Believes Me", directed by Fright Night director Craig Gillespie. The song, produced by Dot da Genius, features Cudi singing and contains elements of rock music. On August 21, Cudi announced that he would no longer be releasing the A Man Named Scott mixtape, so that he can focus on his rock project and his third solo album Man on the Moon III. Kid Cudi released the music video for his second album's title-track "Mr. Rager", on September 8, 2011. The video received all-positive reviews from critics and fans alike.

Despite saying he will not do many more features for other artists in Complex magazine's October/November 2011 cover story, Cudi appeared on Bryan Greenberg's second album We Don't Have Forever (2011), Travis Barker's solo debut Give the Drummer Some (2011), the Knux's Eraser (2011), and Wale's Ambition (2011), respectively. On October 30, 2011, Cudi released Maniac, a short horror film co-starring fellow American rapper Cage and directed by American actor Shia LaBeouf, through his blog. On November 13, 2011, a previously unreleased demo tape Cudi had recorded from 2002 to 2003, under the pseudonym Kid Mesc, titled Rap Hard, leaked online. On Twitter, Cudi wrote "I actually never wanted anyone to hear those songs ever, but its cool. Ha"

On November 18, 2011, Cudi renamed his band for the second time to WZRD (pronounced: w-z-r-d). He also announced that the upcoming rock project would be released on his 28th birthday, January 30, 2012. In late 2011, Cudi was mentioned in a viral video by vlogger Ben Breedlove, about his near death experiences. After Breedlove's death on December 26, 2011, Cudi commented on his thoughts about inspiring the young kid. "I am so sad about Ben Breedlove", Kid Cudi wrote on his Tumblr blog. "I watched the video he left for the world to see, and him seeing me in detail, in his vision really warmed my heart. I broke down, I am to tears because I hate how life is so unfair. This has really touched my heart in a way I cant describe, this is why I do what I do. Why I write my life, and why I love you all so much. Life is really fucked up sometimes, but I know Ben is at Peace, and I hope he gets a chance to sit and talk with my Dad. We love you Ben. Forever. Thank you for loving me. To Ben's family, you raised a real hero, he's definitely mine. You have my love."

In January 2012, Cudi appeared on two songs from Chip tha Ripper's mixtape Tell Ya Friends, "Ride 4 You" which also featured Far East Movement and "GloryUs", which credited the duo as they are collectively known, The Almighty GloryUs. This led to speculation that a long-awaited project from the two was underway. On January 31, Cudi announced through his Twitter feed that he had completed WZRD and that his next album was the collaborative effort with Chip tha Ripper. In 2012, Cudi was featured on the soundtrack to the film The Hunger Games, crafting an original song for the film titled "The Ruler and the Killer". Referring to "The Ruler and the Killer", Cudi wrote on his Twitter feed: "I could not have done it without my producing partners on the project for the film, The legendary and Godly T Bone Burnett and Greg Wells!"

While working on the band's self-titled debut, Cudi claimed he had writer's block for almost five months because of his new sobriety; something that had never happened to him for such an extended period of time. According to Cudi, bands that inspired the album include Electric Light Orchestra, Jimi Hendrix, Nirvana and Pink Floyd. The album includes a song titled "Where Did You Sleep Last Night?", a cover of the same titled song by Nirvana, who in turn were inspired by blues guitar legend Lead Belly's rendition of the traditional folk song. Following WZRD's release on February 28, 2012, the album debuted at number three on the US Billboard 200 chart, with first-week sales of 66,000 physical and digital copies in the United States. The album also debuted on the Top Rock Albums and Top Alternative Albums at number one, and at number nine on the Canadian Albums Chart respectively.

=== 2012–2013: Indicud and departure from GOOD Music ===
In April 2012, in Geneseo, New York, Cudi performed before a sold-out crowd and premiered a hip-hop song, his first since 2010. During his set, he performed a new record, tentatively titled "The Leader of the Delinquents", which he did a cappella. On April 25, 2012 Cudi was officially back to rapping with the release of "Dennis, Hook Me Up with Some More of That Whiskey!". The song, the first ever solely produced by Cudi himself, samples his 2010 song "Ghost!". In June 2012, Cudi was seen in the music video for "Mercy", the lead single from GOOD Music's compilation album Cruel Summer, in which he, along with other GOOD Music recording artists were featured on. Cudi was ultimately featured on two songs from the compilation, "The Morning" and a solo track originally meant for Man on the Moon II (2010), titled "Creepers", produced by Dan Black.

In the summer of 2012, Cudi announced the title of his third studio album to be, Indicud when he tweeted: "My new album is entitled indicud, it will be my version of The Chronic 2001, some songs i'll produce, others i'll feat &/or play songwriter". On June 8, 2012, Cudi announced Indicud, will be a double-disc album. On August 12, Kid Cudi released the lead single from Indicud, a song titled "Just What I Am", featuring his friend and longtime collaborator King Chip (formerly Chip tha Ripper). The album was announced to be released in early 2013 with Cudi focusing on scoring movies, followed by the third installment of the Man on the Moon series.

Cudi then added that Indicud "will feature more uptempos and that it will consist of at most 17 new songs." The music video for "Just What I Am", which marked Cudi's directorial debut, premiered November 6, 2012 on VEVO and was shot in Los Angeles with fans invited to participate in the video's shoot. On November 7, he revealed the album's second official single's title to be "Immortal", and that it again was produced by himself like the two previous releases, "Just What I Am" and "King Wizard". He claimed the song "will make you feel amazing in the heart and soul." The song was officially released via iTunes on March 14, 2013.

On March 14, 2013 Kid Cudi performed at MySpace's South by Southwest (SXSW) secret show in Austin, Texas and after performing his many hits, he previewed a new verse from Indicud. He also revealed that the album would feature 18 tracks, while officially confirming ASAP Rocky and Michael Bolton as featured guests. On March 16, Cudi announced that he would release the album's tracklist and cover art on April 2. Three days later, Kid Cudi announced via Twitter that the album had officially been completed and turned in to his label, Universal Republic. On March 26, the album's cover art and tracklist was unveiled by Walmart and later Complex. Later that day, Cudi appeared on Jimmy Kimmel Live! and performed the album's lead singles; "Just What I Am" and "Immortal", as well as premiering "Mad Solar", which he performed a cappella.

On April 2, 2013, Kid Cudi announced on Power 106, that he was no longer under Kanye West's GOOD Music imprint. Cudi revealed he left the label on good terms, with him saying West respected his decision and will always be "big brother". Cudi's decision to move forward without West, was his desire to focus on his own imprint, Wicked Awesome Records and his friend, fellow rapper King Chip. After Indicud leaked online in its entirety on April 9, 2013, Kid Cudi decided to push the album's release date up to April 16. The album debuted at number two on the chart by moving 140,000 copies. In late 2013, Kid Cudi toured in support of Indicud on The Cud Life Tour 2013. The tour was announced on July 15 with tickets going on sale the following day. Supporting acts on the tour included fellow American rappers Big Sean, Tyler, The Creator and Logic.

=== 2013–2014: Satellite Flight: The Journey to Mother Moon ===
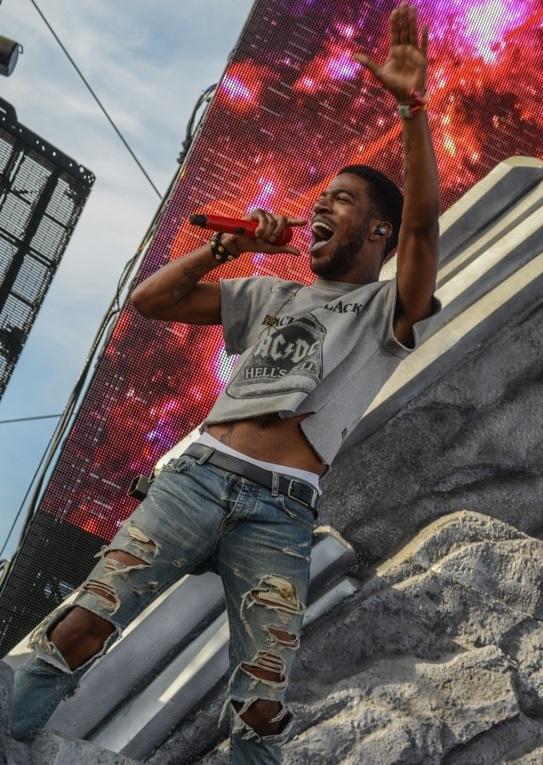
Cudi performing at Coachella in Indio, California, in April 2014

While on tour, on October 16, 2013 Kid Cudi announced he would be releasing an extended play (EP), sometime in the next three months. Cudi also revealed he would be producing it alongside Dot da Genius and that frequent collaborator King Chip, would appear on the EP. He then called the EP a prelude to his fourth album Man on the Moon III, which he announced would be released in 2015. On October 19, 2013, Cudi revealed "Going to the Ceremony", a song he had released via online audio distribution platform SoundCloud, earlier in July, would be included in the EP. Cudi revealed a remix of his hit single "Day 'n' Nite, which was briefly previewed on the intro of his 2008 breakout mixtape A Kid Named Cudi, would also appear on the EP.

On November 25, 2013, via his Twitter, Cudi revealed the title of the EP to be Satellite Flight: The Journey to Mother Moon. On December 16, 2013, Kid Cudi once again utilized SoundCloud to release "Satellite Flight", the EP's title-track. On January 27, 2014, Kid Cudi revealed on Twitter that Satellite Flight: Journey to Mother Moon would no longer be an EP, but a full-length album instead. In a February 2014 interview with MTV News, Cudi discussed the EP's transition to a full-fledged album and called the project his best work yet: "I'm really excited because it's my best work, and it's a surprise. People weren't really expecting it. I've never done two albums within a year of each other."

On February 25, 2014, with only few hours' notice from Cudi, Satellite Flight: The Journey to Mother Moon was released exclusively to digital retailers. The album debuted at number four on the Billboard 200 chart, with first-week sales of 87,000 digital copies in the United States. On March 4, 2014 Cudi appeared on Chelsea Lately, where he was interviewed by Oscar-nominated actress Gabourey Sidibe, to promote Satellite Flight and the 2014 film Need for Speed. On March 12, 2014, Cudi released a song titled "Hero", a collaboration with American singer-songwriter Skylar Grey, recorded for the soundtrack to Need for Speed. On March 15, 2014, Cudi appeared on The Arsenio Hall Show, where he promoted the album, discussed the state of hip-hop, suicidal thoughts, Need for Speed, and performed the song "Internal Bleeding", from the album.

In April 2014, Cudi appeared on the cover of the inaugural issue of Fat Man magazine. On April 24, 2014, while being honored as a mental health advocate by Didi Hirsch Mental Health Services, at the Beverly Hilton in Los Angeles, Cudi offered a special performance during their annual Erasing the Stigma Leadership Awards. On May 2, 2014, it was announced Cudi would headline Chicago's North Coast Music Festival, along with West Coast rapper Snoop Dogg. On May 11, 2014 Cudi revealed he would be writing and directing a short film for the Satellite Flight album cut "Balmain Jeans": "Developing a short film for "Balmain Jeans", a story about a spontaneous electric connection between two strangers."

=== 2015–2016: Speedin' Bullet 2 Heaven ===
In a January 2015 interview, at the Sundance Film Festival, Kid Cudi expressed the possibility of releasing another album before the release of Man on the Moon III: "I'm always making music. The beauty in that is that I have a lot of material. And I'm actually thinking that it would be good to release something in the meantime, before Man on the Moon III comes out. Another Kid Cudi album, it's just kind of along the lines of what I did with Indicud or Satellite Flight, which is just its own standalone thing but still a Kid Cudi album. The Man on the Moon III album is something that's gonna take some time but I know the fans are gonna be patient and I really appreciate that guys, thank you for your patience. But Man on the Moon III is coming, there may be an album before that just to tide you over."

On March 3, 2015, Cudi officially released his first song since his album Satellite Flight, was put on the market. The song, which is titled "Love", was originally recorded for Satellite Flight, and samples Ratatat's "Sunblocks" and has been received with positive reviews. On April 4, 2015, Cudi announced via Twitter that he would be releasing a new album titled Speedin' Bullet 2 Heaven. On August 1, 2015, Cudi released "Confused!", the lead single from his fifth album. On October 27, 2015, Cudi announced the new album will be released on December 4, 2015. He also leaked two songs off the project, "Wedding Tux" and "Judgemental Cunt". In November 2015 Cudi announced an Especial Tour, that will bring the rapper to various theaters all across the United States. On December 1, 2015, Cudi announced the cancellation of his Especial Tour, due to various reasons, such as production and personal issues. To make up for postponing the concert tour, Cudi released the album's title-track as the second single.

=== 2016–2018: Passion, Pain & Demon Slayin' and Kids See Ghosts ===
In March 2016, Kid Cudi performed at McDowell Mountain Music Festival in Phoenix, Arizona. In an early April 2016 interview with Billboard, when asked about Man on the Moon III, Cudi responded with: "I came up with Man on the Moon when I was a young man. People change their vibe! We can follow the same template and do the five-act split. Sonically, I'm still going to be where I'm at. Honestly, I was ready to live up to the obligation and do Man on the Moon III. I haven't been dicking around. I was planning on doing it after Speedin' Bullet. But the Speedin' Bullet response tore me up. It made me realize what's most important. I'm getting back on the bike again and doing what I do best: me." On April 22, 2016, Kid Cudi announced he would be releasing a new studio album, slated for a summer unveiling.

On May 11, 2016, amidst rumors that he was set to release Man on the Moon III, Cudi revealed the title of his sixth solo album would be Passion, Pain & Demon Slayin', through online mobile video-sharing and social networking service Instagram. On June 1, 2016, Cudi announced that he had two upcoming albums. One set to be released in the summer, while the other would be released in the fall. He added that one of them was complete. On September 26, 2016, Kid Cudi unveiled the track-list for Passion, Pain & Demon Slayin' via Twitter, which revealed guest spots from Travis Scott, André 3000, Pharrell Williams and Willow Smith.

Although there was a discrepancy between him and Kanye West, West later made an offer of peace and a song featuring him and Cudi subsequently surfaced online. Passion, Pain & Demon Slayin' was announced to be issued first via digital distribution on December 16, 2016, with the physical release on December 23. Cudi has also shared the song "Baptized in Fire", which features Travis Scott (with whom Cudi collaborated extensively with on 2016's Birds in the Trap Sing McKnight). On March 1, 2017, Kid Cudi performed the song "Kitchen", with a string orchestra, live on The Tonight Show Starring Jimmy Fallon. On August 15, 2017, Cudi announced a national concert tour by the name of Passion, Pain & Demon Slayin' Tour; with the first date on September 30 in Philadelphia, Pennsylvania.

In 2018 Cudi and Kanye West formed a duo known as Kids See Ghosts, and produced an album titled Kids See Ghosts, which was released on June 8, 2018. On October 23, 2018, in response to a fan on Twitter, Cudi revealed he had begun working on his seventh solo album. Although he said he would be taking his time to create his forthcoming LP, Cudi projected a 2019 release.

=== 2019–2022: Man on the Moon III and Entergalactic ===
In July 2019, Kid Cudi announced his next album would be titled Entergalactic, which he revealed would soundtrack an upcoming Netflix "adult-focused animated music series" co-created by himself and Kenya Barris.

On April 14, 2020, Kid Cudi released "Leader of the Delinquents" as a single via Republic Records. The song, which Cudi had first performed in 2012, was later released in a limited edition pressing of the track on 7" vinyl, 12" picture disc, and cassette.

On April 24, 2020, Cudi collaborated with Travis Scott under the collective name the Scotts, to release a song titled "The Scotts". It was hinted that the duo would be releasing more music in the future. The song debuted atop the Billboard Hot 100 chart, becoming Cudi's first number-one hit single in the US.

Later on April 24, Cudi also revealed that he was still working on new music for a future WZRD release, joking that "we take a decade off between albums." On July 9, 2020, Cudi's daughter Vada, announced via social media that he would be releasing a song with multiple Grammy Award-winning artist Eminem, called "The Adventures of Moon Man & Slim Shady" the coming Friday. The song was released on July 10, 2020 and also saw success as a hit, as it debuted in the Top 40 of the Billboard Hot 100.

On October 26, Cudi released a teaser video on his official Twitter account for Man on the Moon III, the final installment in his Man on the Moon series, after a decade between releases. The album title and release date were not shared with the video; however, on December 7, Cudi announced the album would be titled Man on the Moon III: The Chosen, with a release date of December 11, 2020. The concept album's theme follows Cudi overcoming his darkness, but fighting to win his soul back from his alter-ego "Mr. Rager".

Man on the Moon III: The Chosen, received mostly positive reviews from music critics, who praised Cudi's songwriting and generally favored the latter two acts, though some found it derivative of Cudi's earlier albums. It debuted at number two on the Billboard 200, earning 144,000 album-equivalent units of which 15,000 were pure sales, marking Cudi's fifth top 10 album in the US.

Although Entergalactic was originally set for a 2020 release, it was pushed back due to Cudi releasing his long-awaited Man on the Moon III album instead. In January 2021, when asked by a fan on Twitter why Entergalatic's new release date says 2022 on Netflix, Cudi responded, "[Because] that's when it drops. I just gave y'all an album y'all gotta chill and be patient fr [sic] man I'm not doin an album every year."

Cudi was the sole musical guest on Saturday Night Live in April 2021, having previously featured alongside Kanye West and 070 Shake in "Ghost Town" in 2018. He played "Tequila Shots" and "Sad People" with both performances in tribute to Nirvana frontman Kurt Cobain. "Sad People" showcased Cudi in a floral dress designed by Virgil Abloh in a nod to Cobain.

In June 2021, Amazon enlisted Kid Cudi for Prime Day Show; a three-part musical event also featuring Billie Eilish and H.E.R. Cudi's performance included a mission to establish a new community on the moon, while performing with the International Space Orchestra, a new group composed of space scientists from NASA Ames Research Center, the SETI Institute and the International Space University.

A Man Named Scott, a documentary film directed by Robert Alexander, was announced in October 2021 via Prime Video. The film was produced by Mad Solar, Complex Networks and Film 45, set for release in November 2021, and billed as a look at Cudi's journey "over a decade of creative choices, struggles, and breakthroughs."

During his headlining performance at the Rolling Loud music festival, Cudi revealed intentions on releasing two full-length projects in 2022, with plans of releasing an album prior to Entergalactic "I have Entergalactic coming in the summer, and I wanna drop another album before that. I got some tasty surprises and I'm really excited about all this new shit, this new music, to give to you guys," he said before playing a recording of a song that has since been dubbed "Freshie". "That's why I'm teasing this shit now because it's coming out soon."

On December 3, 2021, a collaboration between Cudi and American pop singer Ariana Grande, titled "Just Look Up" was released in promotion for the black comedy film Don't Look Up, in which they both star in. That month, Man on the Moon III: The Chosen broke the record for biggest vinyl sales week for both a male artist and a rap album in Nielsen history.

On April 9, 2022, Cudi performed a medley of "Stars in the Sky" (the lead single for the soundtrack to the film Sonic the Hedgehog 2) and "Pursuit of Happiness" at the Kids' Choice Awards for the first time. On June 24, 2022, a collaboration between Dot da Genius, JID, Denzel Curry, and Cudi, titled "Talk About Me", was released, along with a music video directed by Cole Bennett. In June, Cudi announced his first arena tour with To the Moon World Tour, set to begin in Vancouver on August 16, 2022 and conclude in Milan on November 22, 2022.

On July 4, 2022, Cudi announced a compilation album, The Boy Who Flew to the Moon, Vol. 1, to be released on July 8, along with the re-release of his debut mixtape A Kid Named Cudi on July 15. The compilation features "Love", a bonus track which was previously unofficially released due to sample clearance issues. On July 6, American fast food chain McDonald's, announced the line-up for their 2022 Camp McDonald's virtual experience, led by headliner Kid Cudi. The virtual camp took place over four weeks only available through the McDonald's app.

Upon Entergalactic's release on September 30, the album debuted at number 13 on the US Billboard 200 chart, earning 22,480 album-equivalent units (including 1,791 copies in pure album sales) in its first week. Its visual component Entergalactic received an average rating of 8.20/10 on the review aggregator website Rotten Tomatoes, with 96% of 28 critics' reviews being positive.

In October 2022, on an episode of Hot Ones, Cudi revealed that he didn't know how much longer he would continue making music and that he had an alternative career path in mind. The rapper said he was "kinda nearing the end on all things Kid Cudi". He quoted other rappers including Snoop Dogg, Jay-Z, Eminem and more, saying he didn't think he would have the same longevity at these artists. On November 6, Cudi announced on Twitter he only has one more album left on his recording contract with Republic. He revealed it would not be released in 2023 and that he does not know what he will continue to do following the release.

Kid Cudi's 2010 single "Pursuit of Happiness" was certified diamond (10 million units) by the RIAA in December 2022.

=== 2023–present: Insano and Free ===
Kid Cudi (left) performing alongside Kanye West during his Chicago concert

On February 27, 2023, Cudi announced his last contractual album with Republic Records would be released in late 2023; adding that the rollout for the album would begin mid-year, with singles to be released. Insano would be released on January 11, 2024. Only a month later, Cudi would release a follow-up titled Insano (Nitro Mega) on February 23, 2024. On August 22, 2025, he released the pop album Free. On September 4, 2026, Cudi appeared as a guest performer during the second night of Kanye West's Ye Live in Chicago concert. Following the performance, Cudi took to X to defend their reunion, explaining how West apologized to him after their strained relationship. The rappers performed together again at the AT&T Stadium in Dallas on November 7, 2026.

== Acting career ==
=== 2010–2019: Early venture and minor roles ===
In 2010, Kid Cudi made a guest appearance on American television drama One Tree Hill, starring as himself and performing his Man on the Moon II single "Erase Me", during the episode. In 2010, Kid Cudi also began starring in the HBO comedy series How to Make It in America, as part of the main cast, being credited by his birth name Scott Mescudi, until its cancellation after two seasons. On October 31, 2010, Kid Cudi released a short film, directed by Shia LaBeouf, in which he and fellow American rapper Cage, star as French-speaking serial killers. The short film, titled Maniac, was inspired by Cudi's song "Maniac" from his 2010 album Man on the Moon II, and is an homage to the 1992 Belgian black comedy crime mockumentary, Man Bites Dog. In May 2012, Kanye West premiered a short film he directed, titled Cruel Summer, at the Cannes Film Festival. According to MTV, Kid Cudi is the lead character, playing a "car thief who falls for a blind Arabian princess". The film was shown on seven different screens that turned on and off, giving various angles of each shot.

In October 2012, it was announced Cudi would star in an indie romantic comedy titled Two Night Stand, alongside Analeigh Tipton and Miles Teller. Also in 2012, it was revealed Cudi would star in an indie thriller film titled Tacoma, alongside Patricia Clarkson. In 2013, Cudi guest starred in the animated TV series The Cleveland Show, voicing a character named Devon, in the Season 4 episode "Brownsized". In 2013, he also guest starred on the FOX comedy series Brooklyn Nine-Nine, where he played a criminal named Dustin Whitman. In 2013, it was revealed Cudi would then star in Goodbye World, alongside Adrian Grenier.

In January 2013, Cudi was cast in the film adaptation of Need for Speed. Need for Speed, which is Cudi's feature film debut, was released by Touchstone Pictures on March 14, 2014. In June 2013, it was revealed Cudi would appear in Mark Webber's film The Ever After, alongside Teresa Palmer and Melissa Leo. On November 10, 2014, Cudi guest starred on the CBS American television series Scorpion, as Peyton Temple, a musical prodigy who created a controversial algorithm that generates the perfect hit pop song, who later helps Scorpion investigate the murder of his friend who was a music industry blogger. In February 2014, it was announced Cudi would appear in Entourage (2015), the film adaptation of the popular HBO series Entourage.

On April 11, 2014, it was announced Cudi would star in a film titled James White, alongside Christopher Abbott and Cynthia Nixon. In addition to starring in the film, it was revealed Cudi would also be curating the film's score as well. In January 2015, Cudi revealed he played a homosexual character in James White: "This was way different than anything else I've ever done. It was dope to do that. I felt like I had a responsibility to present a different walk in life from that world." Although his character's sexuality is not outwardly discussed during the film, the original script included a coming-out scene and a kiss between Cudi and a male friend, played by David Call: "I didn't flinch. I'm secure with mine," Cudi told an audience after the film's premiere. "I'm an artist—it's all about playing characters that are intriguing and stimulating."

Also in January 2015, Cudi revealed he had just finished filming a movie titled Vincent-N-Roxxy, alongside Zoe Kravitz and Emile Hirsch. When speaking on Vincent-N-Roxxy, Cudi said: "this movie that I have coming out soon that's my first villain role. It's very violent and very disturbing [...] I play kind of like a drug lord." Cudi took over the mic duties for Reggie Watts, on IFC's television series, Comedy Bang! Bang! on July 10, 2015. As the in-house disc jockey, Cudi crafted original music for the show and appeared in several skits throughout season four. The December 10 Christmas edition of Comedy Bang! Bang!, marked the season finale and Cudi's final episode as bandleader.

In July 2016, it was announced Cudi would join the cast of FOX's Empire, debuting in the third season of the series as "an independent musician who is a rival to Hakeem (Bryshere "Yazz" Gray) both in the studio and in life." Cudi later left the project due to creative differences. In 2017, Cudi appeared in the comedy film Killing Hasselhoff.

In 2019, Cudi had small roles in Drunk Parents, directed by Fred Wolf, and Jexi directed by Jon Lucas and Scott Moore, the latter of which he played himself. That year he also had a recurring role in sci-fi western and dystopian series Westworld.

=== 2020–present: Recognition and directorial debut ===
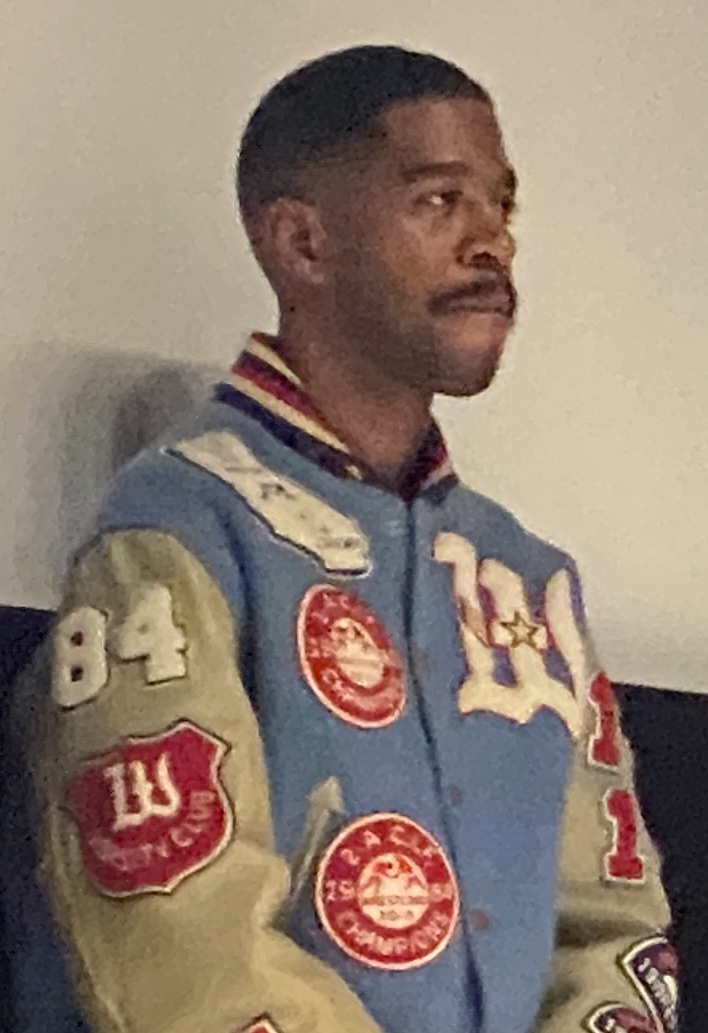
Cudi at the premiere of X in 2022

In 2020, he co-starred in Bill & Ted Face the Music, directed by Dean Parisot, opposite Keanu Reeves and Alex Winter. In 2020, Cudi also starred in We Are Who We Are, an eight-episode miniseries for HBO directed by Luca Guadagnino, alongside Chloë Sevigny. In January 2021, Cudi revealed he would potentially be partnering with TV producer and fellow American rapper 50 Cent, for an upcoming series. In 2021, Cudi served as an executive producer on the award-winning drama film Malcolm & Marie.

In early 2021, Kid Cudi appeared in Crisis, directed by Nicholas Jarecki. In late 2021, Cudi appeared in the ensemble cast of Don't Look Up, where he also performed an original song for the film alongside fellow American singer Ariana Grande. Cudi starred in Ti West's slasher film X, released in March 2022 to critical acclaim. Soon after, it was announced that Cudi was cast in his X co-star Brittany Snow's directorial debut, September 17. In 2023, Cudi starred in Disney's sci-fi film Crater.

Later in March, Cudi revealed he would be making his feature directorial debut with the Netflix film, Teddy, a project he's also written and in which he'll star. Cudi announced the news in a social media post, noting that he'd been working on the project since 2013. Musicians Jay-Z and Jeymes Samuel will serve as executive producers, while being co-produced by Bron Studios and Cudi's Mad Solar banner.

In April 2022, Cudi was cast in the John Woo-directed action-thriller Silent Night, starring alongside Joel Kinnaman. Moreover, as announced in 2019, Cudi starred in his own animated TV special, Entergalactic, at Netflix, a companion piece to his Entergalactic, release on September 30, 2022, in which he co-produced with Kenya Barris, and wrote alongside Ian Edelman and Maurice Williams. In June 2022, the voice cast was announced; Cudi stars alongside Timothée Chalamet, Macaulay Culkin, Laura Harrier, Jessica Williams, and more. In April 2023, it was announced that Cudi was cast in the Knuckles show.

In October 2026, Cudi announced an upcoming biographical drama film titled JEAN, based on the life of legendary American artist Jean-Michel Basquiat. In addition to directing the project, Mescudi wrote the screenplay and is set to star as the titular artist. Described by Mescudi as a "love letter" to Basquiat, the 1980s, and New York City, the film is scheduled to begin production in 2027.

== Artistry ==
=== Musical style ===
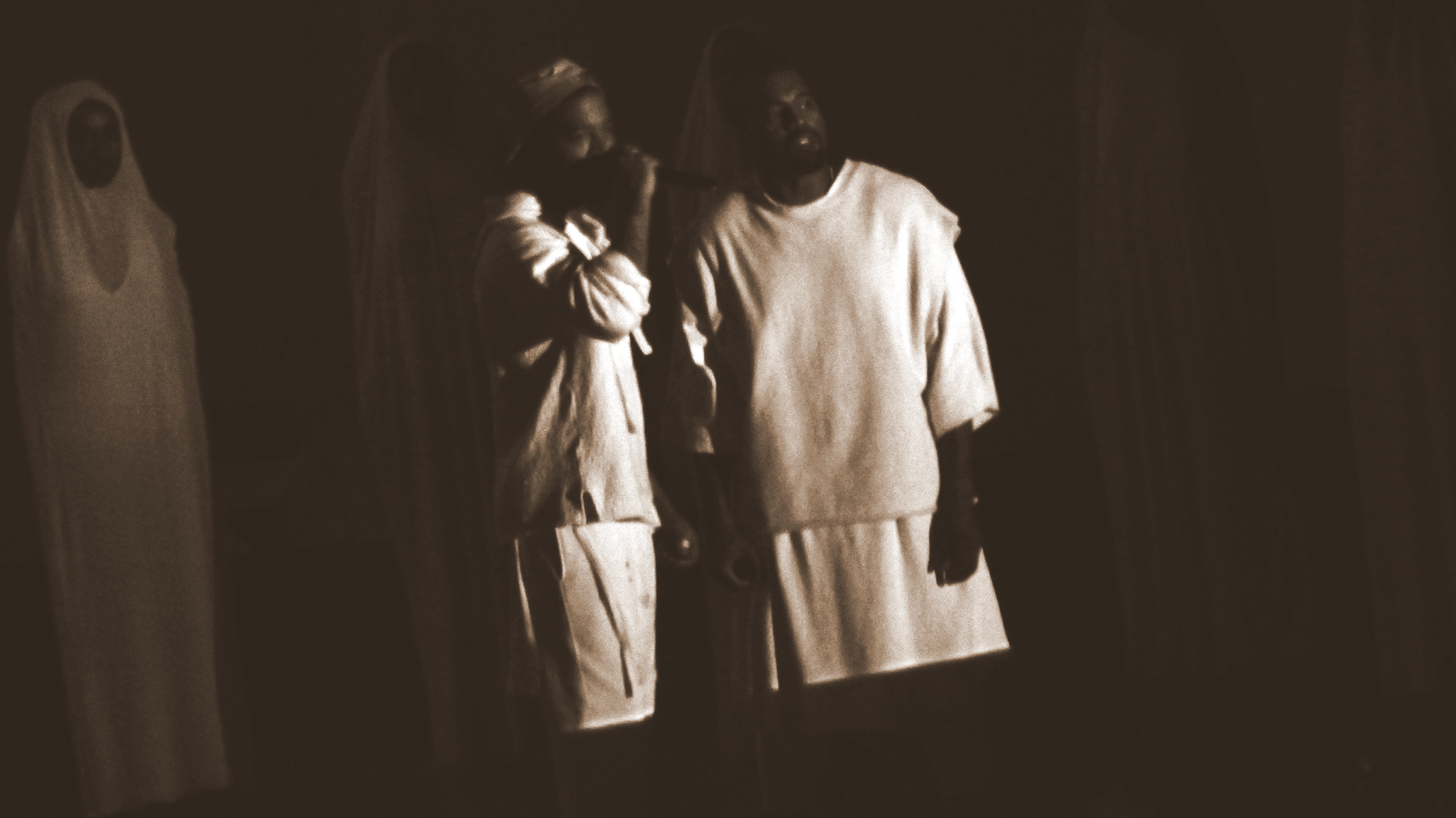
Kanye West and Cudi performing 808s & Heartbreak at the Hollywood Bowl in September 2015

Cudi's musical style has been described as "an atmospheric take on melodic rap, with a dollop of charming, off-key singing". He has also been called "introspective, with the ability to lay his insecurities on record and expose his fallibility." In 2015, Kris Ex of Billboard, wrote "he's always been an emotional artist, dealing with expansive and nebulous feelings in acute and often destructive ways." Kid Cudi's sound is what inspired and led Kanye West to create his cathartic 808s & Heartbreak (2008), with West later stating that he and Cudi were "the originators of the style, kinda like what Alexander McQueen is to fashion.... Everything else is just Zara and H&M." West also complimented Cudi by saying, "His writing is just so pure and natural and important." In March 2014, Cudi talked about wanting to provide guidance for young listeners with his music: "my mission statement since day one [...] all I wanted to do was help kids not feel alone, and stop committing suicide."

"Day 'n' Nite"
The debut single contains confessional, narrative lyrics. Cudi melodically raps introspective rhymes over syncopated drums and spacey, hypnotic synths.

"Going to the Ceremony"
"Going to the Ceremony" is a mediation on addiction. The song is infused with arena rock, being driven by guitar riffs. Kid Cudi's flat singing features winding melodies punctuated by humming.

"Speedin Bullet 2 Heaven"
A simplistic tone poem, the moody track crawls menacingly with a psychedelic loop, chugging acoustic guitar and low-end breakbeats. The song harbors a meditative quality, with Cudi softly singing about manic depression.

In a 2013 article for The BoomBox, the author wrote: "On [A Kid Named Cudi], Cudi raps and croons over samples and interpolations of Gnarls Barkley, Paul Simon, Band of Horses, J Dilla, Nosaj Thing, N.E.R.D. and Outkast. He melded indie rock, electronica and dubstep seamlessly with hip-hop without pandering or reaching. Before Drake broke through with 2009's So Far Gone, rapping and singing over Swedish indie poppers Lykke Li and Peter Bjorn and John, Cudi tweaked with multi-genre covers and seamless transitions between singing and rapping." In a 2009 interview with HipHopDX, when speaking on his debut album Cudi stated: "Well one thing I wanted to do was combine sounds that really bring out intense moods."

His music has also been described as trip hop. Furthermore, he is known for harmonizing and humming in his music, which helps formulate his signature sound. On 2012's WZRD and 2015's Speedin' Bullet 2 Heaven, Cudi incorporated the use of screamed vocals, and can be heard yodeling on his 2016 album Passion, Pain & Demon Slayin'. Throughout the years he has also incorporated elements of psychedelia, R&B, electronica, synthpop, punk and grunge, in his music.

Cudi was gifted a guitar by his manager in 2011, encouraging Cudi to learn. Cudi taught himself how to play the guitar and used the instrument in his rock music throughout his career. Cudi is also a self-taught music producer. In 2021, Cudi appeared on American TV talk show The Shop, where he spoke on his writing and recording process. Cudi mentioned for his early albums he would sit down and write entire verses. However, while working on Kids See Ghosts and Man on the Moon III, he adopted Kanye West's writing process. Instead of writing to a beat, he records a reference track for himself, where he freestyles and hums his way through the beat to get a melody, and fills in the lyrics as they come to him. In 2021, during Songwriter's Roundtable for The Hollywood Reporter, Cudi called his music "space punk rock".

=== Stage presence ===
During his 2013 Cud Life concert tour, Cudi donned a custom made astronaut-esque suit that was designed by noted Hollywood costume designer Jose Hernandez. Officially dubbed the "Satellite Academy Space Suit", Joe La Puma of Complex explained, "It's more than just an interesting clothing choice; the suit represents a transition in his mind-state back to the highly anticipated Man on the Moon III."

=== Influences ===
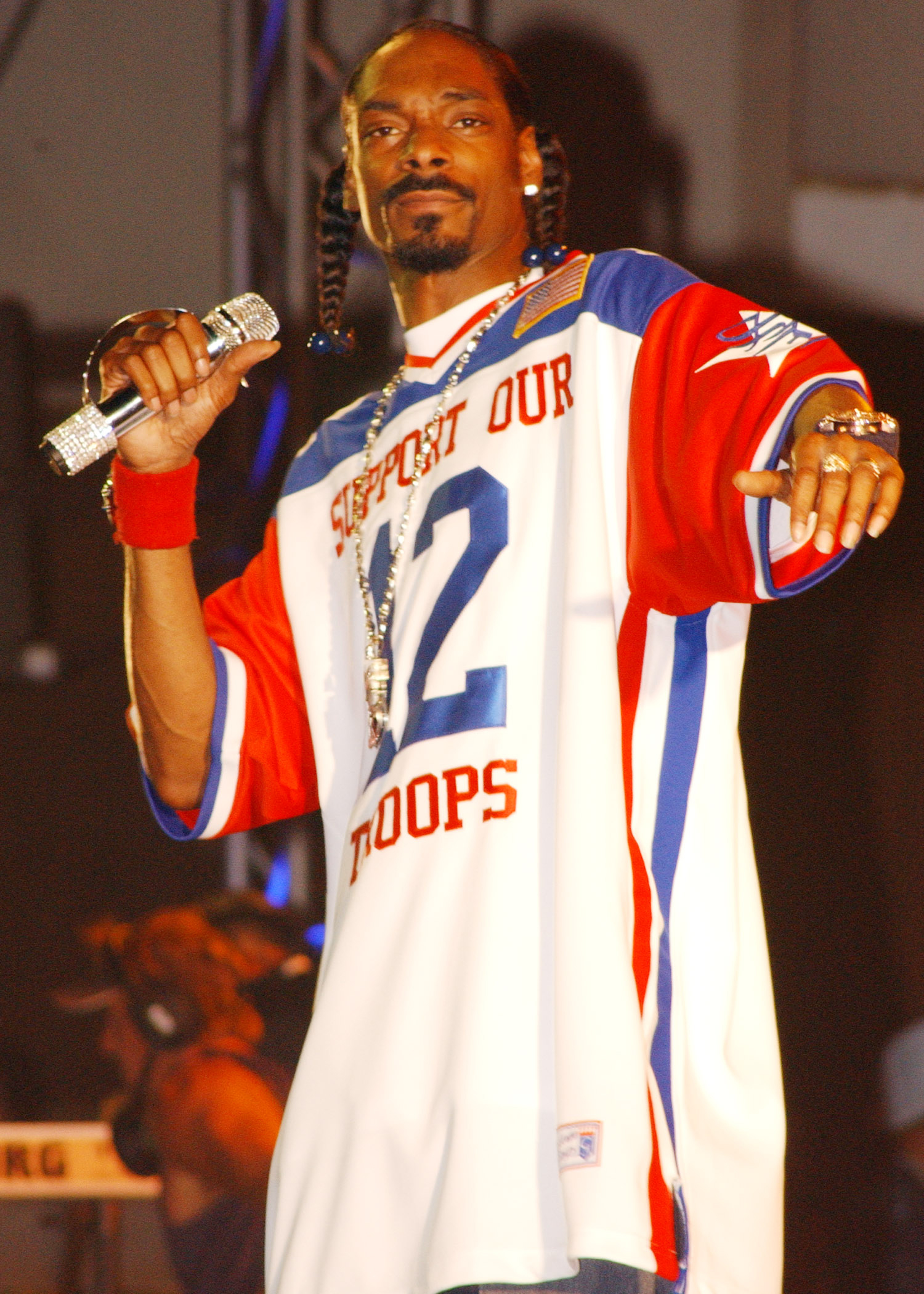
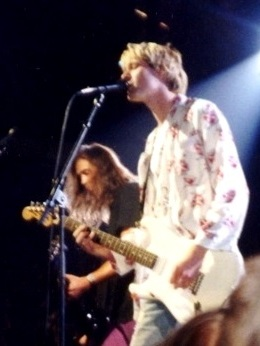
Cudi was inspired by a wide variety of artists, including rapper Snoop Dogg (left) and musician Kurt Cobain (right).

Cudi's earliest influences include alternative hip-hop groups such as the Pharcyde, A Tribe Called Quest and Bone Thugs-n-Harmony. Cudi also cites rappers such as the Notorious B.I.G., Tupac, Jay-Z, Snoop Dogg, Run-DMC, Kurtis Blow, LL Cool J, Salt-N-Pepa, Queen Latifah, Kid 'n Play, N.W.A, Naughty by Nature, Onyx and Public Enemy, as his hip-hop influences while growing up. Speaking to Complex in 2012, Cudi named Doggystyle (1993) as one of his favorite albums of all time, revealing, "Snoop Dogg is my favorite rapper ever [...] It was the first time I was introduced to the man and I thought he was the coolest motherfucker alive. His whole cadence, his delivery, his swag—it was real. It was something that I never heard before."

Kid Cudi has also credited fellow Ohio native Camu Tao, as an influence. He has also been inspired by the sounds of the O'Jays, Ratatat, MGMT and the Postal Service. In 2010, he began experimenting with rock music; rock acts that inspired Cudi include the Electric Light Orchestra, Jimi Hendrix, Nirvana, the Pixies and Pink Floyd. Kid Cudi also credits English singer-songwriter David Bowie as a "huge inspiration". Production wise, Cudi has named Dr. Dre, Swizz Beatz, Timbaland and Kanye West, as his top four favorite producers; also naming Emile Haynie and Plain Pat, calling them "geniuses" for seeing his potential before he was even completely aware of it.

== Other ventures ==
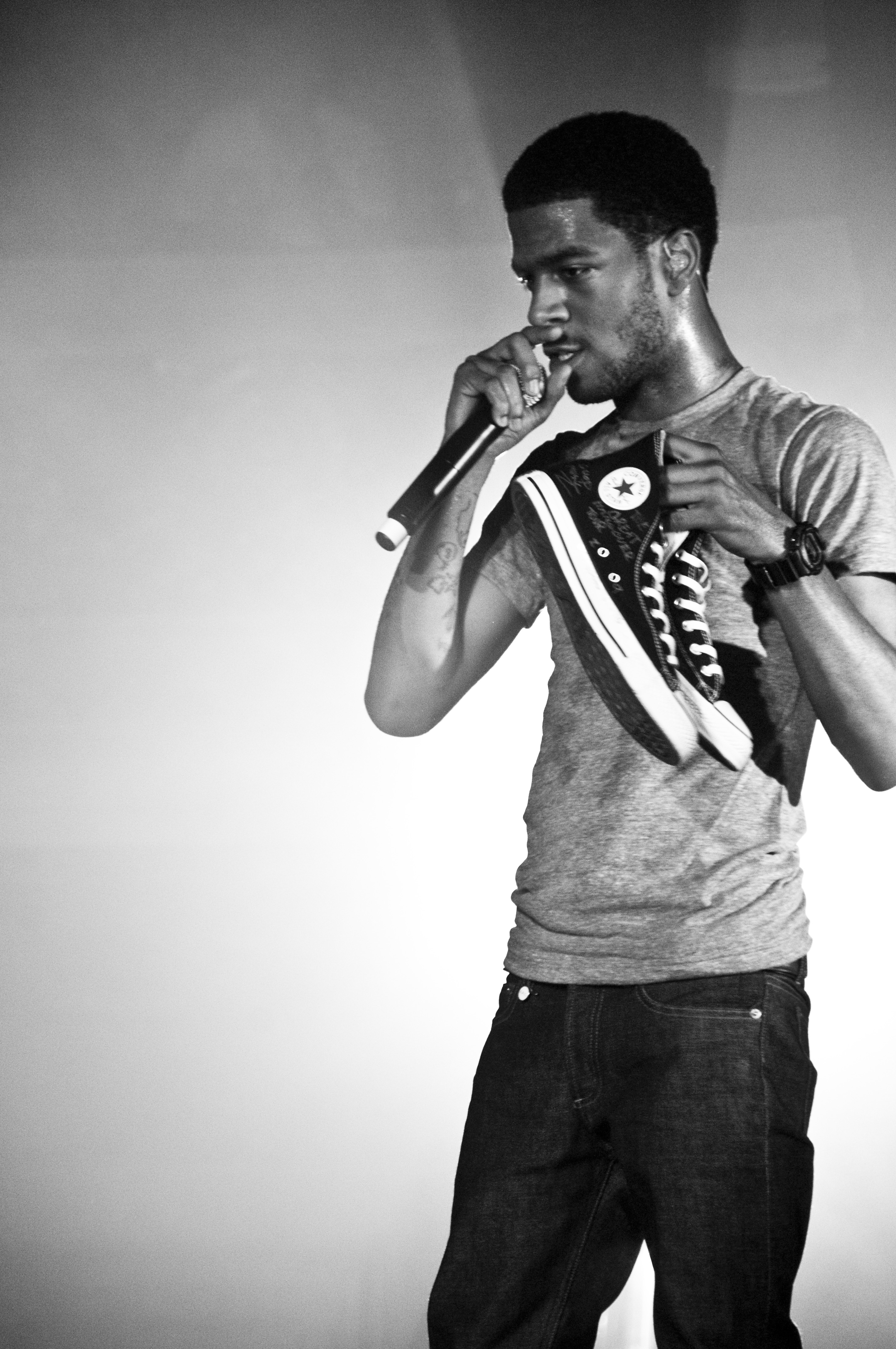
Cudi performing in San Francisco in July 2009

=== Fashion ===
In September 2009, Japanese clothing company BAPE printed Cudi's likeness on T-shirts. In 2021, Cudi and BAPE collaborated on a series 20 pieces logos and other things.

In February 2011, Kid Cudi announced a collaboration with Parisian brand Surface to Air. In the fall of 2011, he released a leather jacket collection in collaboration with the fashion label.

In August 2014, Giuseppe Zanotti designed an exclusive sneaker inspired by Kid Cudi's style.

In February 2019, Kid Cudi partnered with French fashion brand A.P.C. The capsule collection included denim, sneakers, and t-shirts.

Kid Cudi announced a partnership with Adidas in March 2019. On December 10, 2020, Cudi unveiled his Adidas sneakers. They are the self-named VADAWAM 326's that were released on December 17, 2020.

On May 20, 2020, Kid Cudi announced he was partnering with American designer Virgil Abloh, to release an exclusive "Leader of the Delinquents" t-shirt. The design on the black and white "PULLING STRINGS" t-shirt features Kid Cudi puppeteering a smaller version of himself, hence the name of the t-shirt release. The art is meant to reference Cudi's infamous TMZ moment from 2012, in which he posed like the puppet on the shirt. "Leader of the Delinquents" is written across the back of the t-shirt in text reminiscent of Jean-Michel Basquiat's handwriting.

Just hours before releasing his long-awaited Man on the Moon III album, Cudi rolled out a small batch of merchandise in support of the album. The range was made in collaboration with Cactus Plant Flea Market, and consists of short- and long-sleeve T-shirts, pullover hoodies, and sweatpants—all of which feature graphics that reference MOTM3 tracks.

In April 2021, Kid Cudi performed on Saturday Night Live wearing a floral-print sundress, created by Virgil Abloh. On April 11, Cudi confirmed that he would have an upcoming collection with Italian luxury fashion label Off-White, with the floral dress serving as one of the pieces.

In late April 2021, it was revealed Kid Cudi had teamed up with the NFL to release a limited-edition Starter jacket commemorating the 2021 NFL draft, which took place in Cudi's hometown of Cleveland.

In June 2023, Cudi collaborated with American art collective MSCHF to release sneakers, which Cudi previewed during his headlining performance at Lyrical Lemonade's Summer Smash Festival in Chicago.

==== MOTR ====
On January 26, 2021, Kid Cudi announced on Twitter that he would be starting his own clothing line and the first pieces would be available sometime in 2021. In February 2022, Cudi launched his very own clothing line called MOTR, pronounced "motor" and an acronym for "Members of the RAGE". The clothing line is described as a fusion of "90s grunge with the soul of hip hop and elements from a distant future." Its UFO logo was co-designed by Cudi and Japanese fashion designer Nigo, while the retro-inspired website was designed by Cudi himself. The first piece that was issued was a t-shirt created in collaboration with Nigo's Human Made. Created for NBA All-Star Weekend, the shirt comes in white and features the MOTR logo in Cleveland Cavaliers colors and the Earth replaced with a basketball. On September 21, 2022, Cudi announced that his MOTR fashion line, will debut at Paris Fashion Week 2023. He also revealed the line is all-unisex pieces, produced "in Italy and parts of Europe"; additionally the line will also feature sneakers. After launching the line in Paris, Vogue wrote "hip-hop culture, retro-inflected futurism, Japanese street fashion and a general embrace of grunge are all brewing in his extroverted, Gen Z-leaning lineup." On July 27, 2023, Cudi launched MOTR at the London department store, Selfridges. At the release, he spoke with Highsnobiety about how the brand came together. Cudi says the late Virgil Abloh and his Off-White brand served as an inspiration for the effort.

=== Modeling ===
In 2010, Cudi modeled for a campaign run by American fashion house Calvin Klein. In January 2015, Coach, Inc. announced Kid Cudi as the new face of their brand, along with actress Chloë Grace Moretz, to front its Spring campaign. In September 2021, Cudi partnered with Cadillac, for the campaign for their 2023 Lyriq. In January 2022, Cudi modeled for the Levi Strauss & Co. campaign titled "The Number That Changed Everything". In March 2022, Cudi was featured in a jewelry-focused campaign from French fashion house Louis Vuitton. The LV Volt campaign sees Cudi, Alicia Vikander and Jin Chen, modeling a range of pieces from the unisex collection. In August 2023, American fashion house Calvin Klein officially launched its Fall 2023 campaign, adding Kid Cudi as one of their new ambassador features. Modeling for Calvin Klein, Cudi posted a picture of himself posing in front of a Manhattan billboard on Twitter, with the caption: "I always walked past this billboard and dreamed of being up there one day. This is unreal. I remember I mentioned I realllly wanted this billboard at the shoot and they told me, 'we'll see.' Thank u @calvinklein for makin another dream of mine come true."

=== Dream On ===
Dream On
- Parent company: Universal Music Group
- Founded: 2009
- Founder: Kid Cudi; Patrick Reynolds; Emile Haynie
- Defunct: 2011
- Distributor: Universal Motown
- Country of origin: United States

Dream On was an American record label founded in 2009, by Cudi alongside his managers at the time, Patrick Reynolds and Emile Haynie. In February 2011, Cudi announced the label had been dissolved. The label released the first two installments of Cudi's Man on the Moon series.

=== Wicked Awesome Records ===
Wicked Awesome Records
- Parent company: Universal Music Group
- Founded: 2011
- Founder: Kid Cudi
- Status: Active
- Distributors: Republic; Def Jam (Kids See Ghosts)
- Country of origin: United States

Wicked Awesome Records is an American record label founded by Cudi in 2011. It is distributed by Republic Records. In a 2013 interview, Cudi said "Wicked Awesome was there officially when I did WZRD. That was the first project that I did on Wicked Awesome and it was an outlet for me to just branch out on my own, and creatively and business-wise take things to a different space for me. Wicked Awesome..where do I see it going? Right now it's just the music but who knows? Wicked Awesome is maybe gunna be beyond music it could be movies, it could be a lot of things, producing T.V. shows. Just the name I think is really dope it has a ring to it." Cudi continued, explaining the motivation behind his label. "The whole motivation is just bringing authenticity back to the forefront. Bringing real content, bringing real emotion [...] Wicked Awesome is about being a real human being, making real music, talking about real things that people deal with on a day-to-day basis." In January 2021, Cudi tweeted that he is prepared to sign artists and producers.

=== Mad Solar ===
Mad Solar
- Founded: 2020
- Founder: Kid Cudi; Dennis Cummings; Karina Manashil
- Key people: Kid Cudi; Dennis Cummings; Karina Manashil
- Parent: Bron Studios

On November 17, 2020, it was revealed Cudi teamed with Dennis Cummings and Karina Manashil to found production and music management company Mad Solar, with the backing of Bron Studios, which provides corporate back office and production support, including financing, marketing, and sales. In a statement Cudi said, "Beyond excited to be launching my production company Mad Solar and partnering with Bron, whose creative vision and storytelling has transformed the industry." Mad Solar has produced the Netflix animated special Entergalactic, which Cudi co-created alongside Kenya Barris. Additionally, Mad Solar teamed with A24 and Bron Studios on the horror film X. Written and directed by Ti West, X stars Mia Goth, Cudi and Jenna Ortega. Cudi served as an executive producer on the film, which began production in early 2021.

=== Encore Music Technologies ===
In October 2020, it was announced Cudi teamed with screenwriter Ian Edelman and startup veteran Jonathan Gray to launch Encore Music Technologies, a mobile-based platform to help artists monetize their connections with fans. Earlier in 2020, Encore closed a $2 million seed round led by global investment firm Battery Ventures.

In 2022, it was revealed Encore Studio was backed by $9 million funding led by Battery Ventures along with investments from 468 Capital, Parade Ventures, Nomad Ventures, Moving Capital, Kayak Ventures, and Gaingels.

=== Memoir ===
In September 2022, Cudi revealed that he had begun working on his memoir. It was released in August 2025. The book debuted at number four on the Publishers Weekly Bestseller List selling 8,028 units in its first week.

=== Comic ===
During New York Comic Con 2023, it was revealed that Cudi would be teaming up with writer Kyle Higgins to make his comic writing debut with the series Moon Man. Cudi and Higgins write the series, with art and colors being provided by Marco Locati and Igor Monti respectively. A collaboration between Cudi's Mad Solar and Higgins' Black Market Narrative and published by Image Comics, the series revolves around Ramon Townsend, an astronaut from Cleveland who, following a mission that almost killed him and his crew, begins to develop abilities and becomes the world's first superhero. The series was anticipated to launch in January 2024 and to be accompanied by a mixtape composed by Cudi.

Cudi and Higgins debuted the first issue of Moon Man on January 31, 2024. The comic series launched to immediate commercial success, with Image Comics reporting that the first issue had sold out to high demand and outpaced distributor supply, thus prompting an urgent reprint. The second issue was released on April 17, 2024, and the third issue followed on July 10, 2024. On the same day that the third issue released, Cudi also released "Dreams I See", a single intended to support the issue's launch.

== Public image ==
Kid Cudi has been described by the media as a visionary, and a fashion icon. In his early career, Kid Cudi received criticism in the hip-hop community for wearing skinny jeans, before they became trendy after being worn by mainstream rappers, such as Lil Wayne and Kanye West. Cudi made headlines when he wore a kilt to a 2010 New Year's Eve party in Miami. In April 2012, he made headlines again in a now-infamous moment when he gave TMZ paparazzi the finger, claiming they have never "posted anything to make him look good".

In 2014, Cudi made headlines when he performed in a crop top at the annual Coachella Valley Music and Arts Festival. In April 2021, he appeared as the sole musical guest on Saturday Night Live, where he performed "Tequila Shots" and "Sad People". Both performances were in tribute to Nirvana's late frontman Kurt Cobain; however, it was his performance of "Sad People" that made headlines because Cudi wore a dress as a statement against social norms much like his idol Cobain had done.

In September 2021, Cudi made headlines twice; first arriving at New York Fashion Week with electric blue hair, a Nirvana long-sleeve tee and a floor-length black skirt. A few days later, Cudi showed up to the Met Gala wearing fluorescent green hair and dark eye makeup. At the Gala, Cudi was in head-to-toe Louis Vuitton (LV), with a blue sweater, another floor-length skirt and blue-and-green LV sneakers.

On November 10, 2021, Kid Cudi posed for photos at the CFDA Fashion Awards in a custom bridal gown, standing hand-in-hand with its designer, ERL's Eli Russell Linnetz, lace-gloved fingers interlocked, both wearing American Gothic expressions. On the red carpet, Linnetz lifted Cudi's veil. "Be yourself, be free, baby, yeah," Cudi said into a microphone, with a grin; he'd paired the dress with a white tux jacket, crystal-covered sneakers, grungy eyeliner, an icy Black Jesus pendant, and Manic Panic-pink hair. The dress was another homage to Kurt Cobain.

== Personal life ==
=== Drug use ===
In a January 2013 interview, Cudi revealed that he had stopped smoking cannabis in 2011, both for the sake of his child and due to frustration with constantly being associated with the drug and stoner culture.

In a March 2013 interview, Cudi talked about how his initial sudden and unexpected fame drove him to alcohol and drugs:

For me, I just got to this point, and especially up until recently, I gave up liquor, I don't drink anymore, it's been five and a half months I've been sober. The booze was a new thing for me, I didn't realize I was an alcoholic all these years. I had a problem, I think with any addiction you have to be ready to make the choice, whether it's cigarettes or anything. You have to just commit and you just have to stick with it. I stopped everything cold turkey. When I had my cocaine problem I stopped cold turkey, I didn't go to rehab. I don't believe in these things. Some people need the extra help, not me. I wasn't a drug addict before this crap, I wasn't doing cocaine, I wasn't getting wasted every night because I didn't want to be alone. I wasn't this dark person before the madness, I was a whole other dude. I don't even think I smoked weed as much 'cause we couldn't afford it. You just have to make the choice and decide the person you wanna be and stick with it. You get to a certain age where the people around you are not gonna be on that rollercoaster all day long ready for you to go up, ready for you to go down, and stick with you through all the madness. People want you to be one person and stick with it and I chose to be clean and be sober and get my life together. For myself, for my health, for my daughter, for my family.

Despite this period of sobriety, in 2022 Cudi tweeted about going to rehab and relapsing with cocaine in 2016:

I was in rehab when the "Frequency" video came out. I shot it, then went on a 2 week cocaine run. Edited the video sneaking into the bathroom to do bumps. Then, I woke up one day and said, "Ima die if things dont change". So, I made sure things changed.

=== Mental health ===
In a 2013 interview, Cudi revealed he had suffered an addiction to anti-depressant medication, which had been prescribed to help him deal with an "emotional breakdown" after a failed relationship. Cudi has been open about his addiction to pharmaceuticals in his music, namely the songs "Dr. Pill" and "The Nothing". In a 2014 interview, Cudi spoke on his struggles with depression and suicidal ideation: "I've dealt with suicide for the past five years. There wasn't a week or a day that didn't go by where I was just like, 'You know, I wanna check out.' I know what that feels like, I know it comes from loneliness, I know it comes from not having self-worth, not loving yourself."

In a July 2016 interview, Kid Cudi revealed he suffered from survivor guilt: "I didn't like that I had money and success and I had made it. Everybody I had ever met in my life, good people, weren't able to experience the same, and I wasn't able to truly enjoy my success. Even though I worked hard for it, it bothered me that I had just had so much and my friends didn't."

In October 2016, Cudi revealed on his Facebook page that he had checked himself into rehabilitation for depression and suicidal urges. In an August 2022 interview with Esquire, Cudi spoke on how two weeks after being admitted to rehab in 2016, he had suffered a stroke, revealing the incident forced him to spend the next few months in physical rehabilitation.

=== Family ===
On March 26, 2010, Cudi's daughter, Vada Wamwene Mescudi, was born. Throughout 2012, Cudi was in a custody battle over his daughter. Reports surfaced that Cudi gave up custody after his child's mother accused him of being an absentee father, as well as having violent tendencies and a "long history of consistent drug and alcohol abuse." These claims were disputed by Cudi and his attorney in a statement, which noted: "Cudi did not give up custody but reached an amicable agreement with the mother; that 'both parents are fit and proper persons to have custody of their child,' as stated in the final custody judgment; results came back negative for drugs in a drug test voluntarily taken by Cudi; and that the court acknowledged Cudi attempted to establish a relationship and visit his child since her birth and "voluntarily provided financial support, including child support, rent and other monthly payments, for his daughter since her birth until the time that a child support order was entered as part of the normal course of the case." Details of the official custody agreement remain private. Cudi has since purchased a property in Chicago to be close to his daughter.

=== Relationships ===
In 2009, Cudi began dating entertainment attorney Jamie Baratta. They were in an on-again, off-again relationship, and were a prominent couple in the music industry. They ultimately broke up in 2012, but not before Cudi dedicated a song to her titled "Teleport 2 Me, Jamie", which he recorded as a member of the alternative rock duo, WZRD. In 2020, Cudi wrote "Sept. 16", a song titled after the birthdate of his girlfriend at the time, costume designer and actress Raquel Deriane, to whom the song is dedicated.

According to a 2023 lawsuit filed by Cassie Ventura against her former partner Sean Combs, Ventura dated Cudi in or around 2012, resulting in Combs threatening Ventura that he would "blow up [Cudi's] car." Cudi confirmed that soon after this threat, his car had exploded.

In 2024, Cudi announced via Instagram that he was engaged to designer Lola Abecassis Sartore. The two were married on June 28, 2025, in Èze, France.

=== Religious beliefs ===
In a January 2013 interview, Cudi said that he believes in God but does not follow an organized religion. He considers himself spiritual but not religious.

=== Political views ===
Cudi expressed solidarity with Palestine during the Gaza war. In November 2023, he signed an open letter calling for a ceasefire and an end to Israel's blockade of the Gaza Strip. He called Israel's offensive in Gaza a genocide.

== Philanthropy ==
On April 8, 2014, Didi Hirsch Mental Health Services announced that it would recognize mental health advocates Kid Cudi, Ronda Rousey and Natasha Tracy, during its annual Erasing the Stigma Leadership Awards on April 24, at the Beverly Hilton in Los Angeles. Committed to helping depressed and suicidal youth through the power of music, Cudi joined Didi Hirsch's Erasing the Stigma Efforts as a Mental Health Ambassador.

On February 7, 2015, Kid Cudi partnered with TED to give a TED Talk at his former school, Shaker Heights High School, to help inspire the students with his story, for the school's independently organized "TEDxSHHS" conference.

Kid Cudi has also been a volunteer for Musicians on Call (MOC), a charity with the mission of bringing live and recorded music to the bedsides of patients in healthcare facilities. In December 2015, Cudi arranged a dance party for the teenage participants of the Children's Hospital At Montefiore's (CHAM) B-N-Fit program, in the Bronx. Kid Cudi also hosted a group of young patients and their families from CHAM, at his sold-out Roseland Ballroom shows in April 2016.

In June 2016, 49 celebrities, including Kid Cudi, honored the 49 victims killed in the Orlando nightclub shooting in a video tribute.

In 2019, Kid Cudi teamed up with delivery service Postmates to deliver $10,000 worth of Popeyes takeout to the Coachella Valley Rescue Mission. Hundreds in need at the Indio shelter were presented with Popeyes' chicken, biscuits, mashed potatoes, and fries the evening before Cudi's second set at Coachella.

In June 2022, at an event organized by Tory Burch, Brent Saunders, and Anna Wintour, supporting the New York-Presbyterian Hospital's Youth Anxiety Center, Cudi led the conversation on youth anxiety, depression, and the importance of self-care and treatment.

== Impact and legacy ==
A number of publications have noted Kid Cudi's impact on contemporary hip-hop music since his mainstream debut in 2009. Luke Hinz of HotNewHipHop said "Cudi has inspired a generation of young artists to be unafraid to explore a wide array of emotions, and many have sought to adapt elements of Cudi's music into their own. Never caring to fit into the conventional boundaries of music, Cudi became a voice for those who felt unrepresented and alone."

In a 2015 article titled "KiD CuDi – A Forgotten Influence on Psychedelic Introspection in Hip-Hop", the author wrote "Cudi helped bring about a new era of electronic, psychedelic driven production. And his dark, drug-riddled approach to introspection has already taken hold in the up-and-comers in the hip-hop world." Uproxx stated, "Compared to modern icons like Drake, West, and Wayne, Cudi doesn't have a boatload of sales, or a room full of accolades, but his weighty impact is reflected in adulation from the people, which is the intangible, everlasting achievement that most artists live for. He's one of the first artists to be unabashed about his depressive ruminations and did so in a melodically intriguing manner that progressed alternative rock aesthetics into the hip-hop world one cadence at a time."

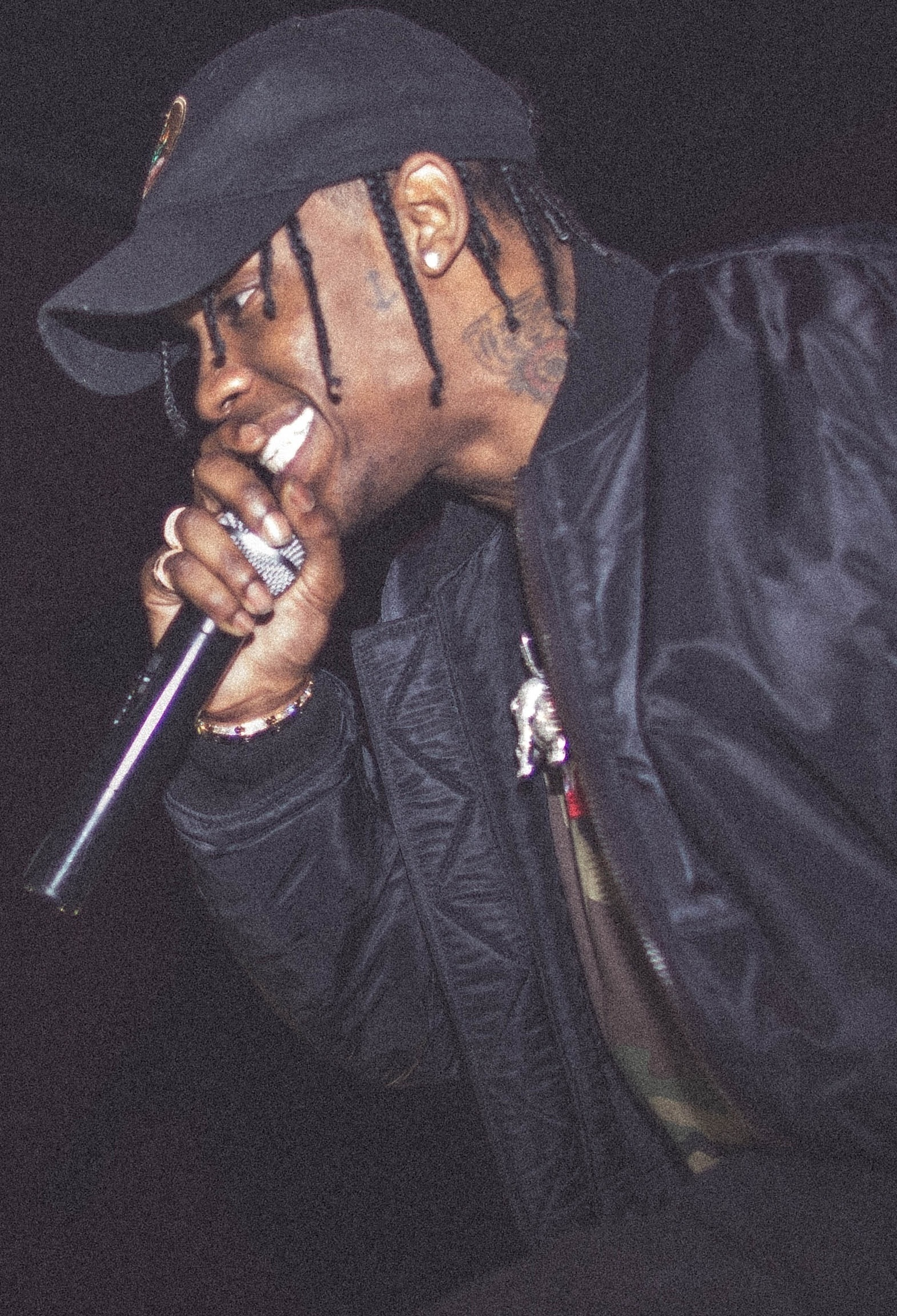
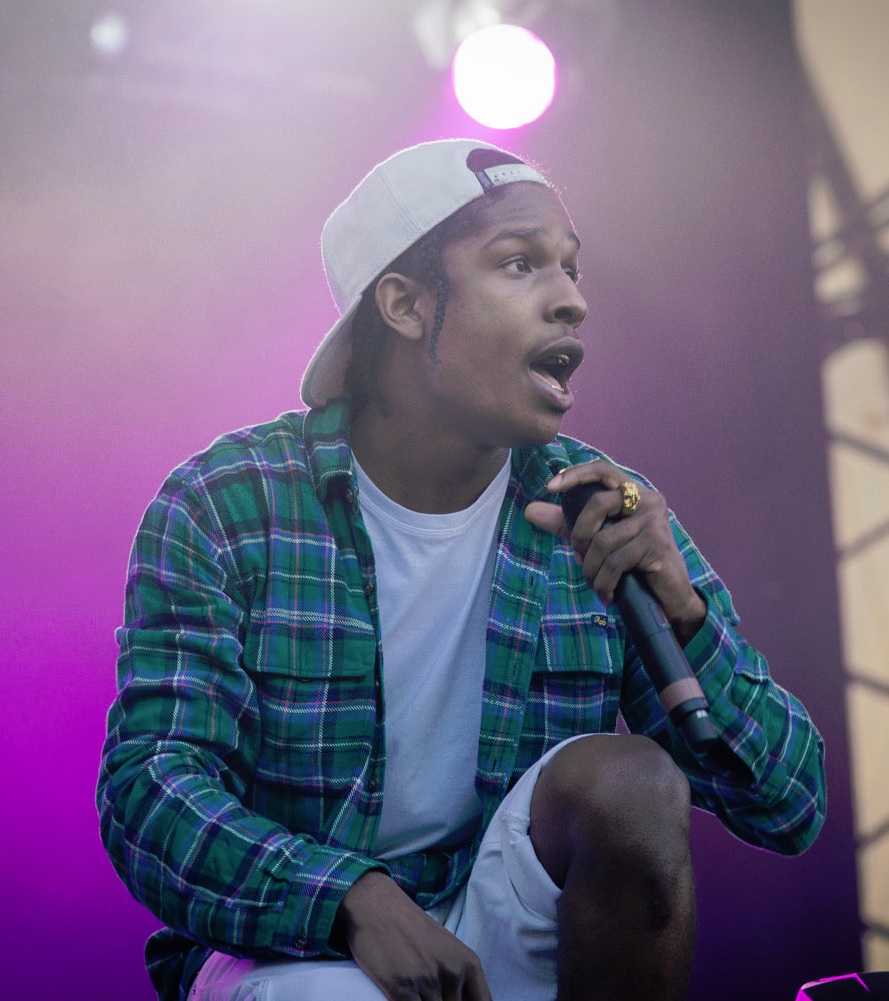
American rappers Travis Scott (left) and ASAP Rocky (right) both cite Kid Cudi as a major influence.

Eric Diep of Complex said "Cudi is an omnipresent figure in pop culture who has inspired many. He's a voice for young creatives who don't fit in. He's a therapeutic light for people who need a helping hand. He's a fashion icon. He's more than a cool cameo in television and movies, but a full-fledged actor." Revolt writer Preezy Brown noted "His knack for displaying vulnerability and addressing bouts with mental health has made him an inspiration for a long list of artists including Juice Wrld, Logic, Lil Yachty, and other leaders of the new school."

Paul Thompson of Rolling Stone wrote Cudi has "dozens of stylistic children". Several artists have gone on to credit Kid Cudi as influence or inspiration, such as rappers Kanye West, Travis Scott, Kendrick Lamar, Schoolboy Q, Chance the Rapper, Childish Gambino, Logic, ASAP Rocky, ASAP Nast, Allan Kingdom, Kyle, Isaiah Rashad, Raury, Key!, Denzel Curry, Kevin Abstract, Saba, Baby Keem and Jaden Smith, as well as singers Willow Smith, Jhene Aiko, Lissie and Tinashe, among others.

In 2009, Canadian recording artist Drake shared his admiration for Cudi on Twitter with a picture of him holding both his and Cudi's respective projects, stating "We are rarely proud when we are alone. But to have another artist who pushes me and inspires me is a blessing."

In a 2010 interview with Billboard, Kanye West called Cudi his "personal favorite artist in the world right now. His whole take on the game is just unfiltered, uncensored artistry." In 2016, Kanye West called Cudi "the most influential artist of the past 10 years".

West Coast hip-hop duo Audio Push have also praised Cudi, in 2016, saying "The thing I love about Cudi is he's unapologetically real. He birthed so much of, not even the new generation of artists, but a lot of [your] favorite artists wouldn't be [your] favorite artists if it wasn't for Cudi." In November 2016, Atlanta-based rapper OG Maco, who has cited Cudi as a major influence on several occasions, released an EP titled For Scott, as a tribute to Kid Cudi.

In October 2018, American musician and high-profile producer Pharrell Williams, spoke on his collaborations with Cudi in an interview with Complex, saying: "He's so inspiring, and I'm only as good as my collaborations anyway. I love the stuff that we did. Love, love [...] So to me, Cudi is a GOAT. His melodies and his concepts—he's a timeless alien." In another interview with Complex, Williams also stated "When they say Cudi is the [greatest of all time], they're talking about the consistency of his convictions and how that's played out into the choices that he makes, the taste that he has, and the tone that he takes with everything that he does. That's my idea of Cudi."

American comedian and actor Pete Davidson, who called Cudi "the best musician that's ever lived" in a 2019 interview on The Tonight Show Starring Jimmy Fallon, has also shared his own struggles with his mental health and claims Cudi's music has saved his life. Houston-based rapper Travis Scott, whose stage name is derived from Cudi's first name, has also claimed Cudi's music saved his life and has a tattoo of the word "rager" in honor of Cudi. American musician 070 Shake shared with Pigeons & Planes, "All my life I grew up listening to [...] Kid Cudi. I've cried to their music. They've definitely changed my life, and saved me from a lot of stuff." Brockhampton's Kevin Abstract has said "I love how he incorporated melody into his raps," Kevin explained. "A kid like me would say, like, Kid Cudi saved my life."

American rapper Logic, who has interpolated Kid Cudi's music in his own, has also spoke about how Cudi's music inspired him to open up about mental health in his own music. "He was the dude that was like, 'It's okay to be sad. It's okay to talk about these things, and go through these things.'" In a 2019 interview, then-up-and-coming rapper Baby Keem, cited Cudi as a major influence: "I was inspired by Cudi's cadences and shit like that. Kid Cudi's one of my favorite artists."

In an interview with New York City radio station Hot 97, Jaden Smith spoke on Cudi's influence on him: "Cudi would always say things that just would, like, change my life [...] I thought it was just me and my brother for a while. Then I got older and started going to festivals and then I realized, oh man, everybody has felt that from Cudi. Everybody says that Cudi saved their life. [...] Everybody had that same experience listening to Cudi. If someone listened to Cudi, you knew something about them. You could tell certain things about them."

American-French actor Timothée Chalamet considers Kid Cudi to be one of his biggest inspirations. Chalamet would later star alongside Cudi in Entergalactic, the documentary A Man Named Scott, and as members of the ensemble cast of Don't Look Up. In a Esquire interview, Cudi revealed he met 17-year-old Chalamet at a concert in Montreal and later become friends with him after a phone call. In 2022, Cudi stated that he considers Chalamet and Jaden Smith as "the little brothers I wish I had."

== Discography ==
Studio albums

- Man on the Moon: The End of Day (2009)
- Man on the Moon II: The Legend of Mr. Rager (2010)
- Indicud (2013)
- Satellite Flight: The Journey to Mother Moon (2014)
- Speedin' Bullet 2 Heaven (2015)
- Passion, Pain & Demon Slayin' (2016)
- Man on the Moon III: The Chosen (2020)
- Entergalactic (2022)
- Insano (2024)
- Insano (Nitro Mega) (2024)
- Free (2025)

Collaborative albums

- WZRD (with Dot da Genius, as WZRD) (2012)
- Kids See Ghosts (with Kanye West, as Kids See Ghosts) (2018)

== Filmography ==
Kid Cudi has appeared in several feature films and television shows. He is often credited by his birth name Scott Mescudi.

== Concert tours ==
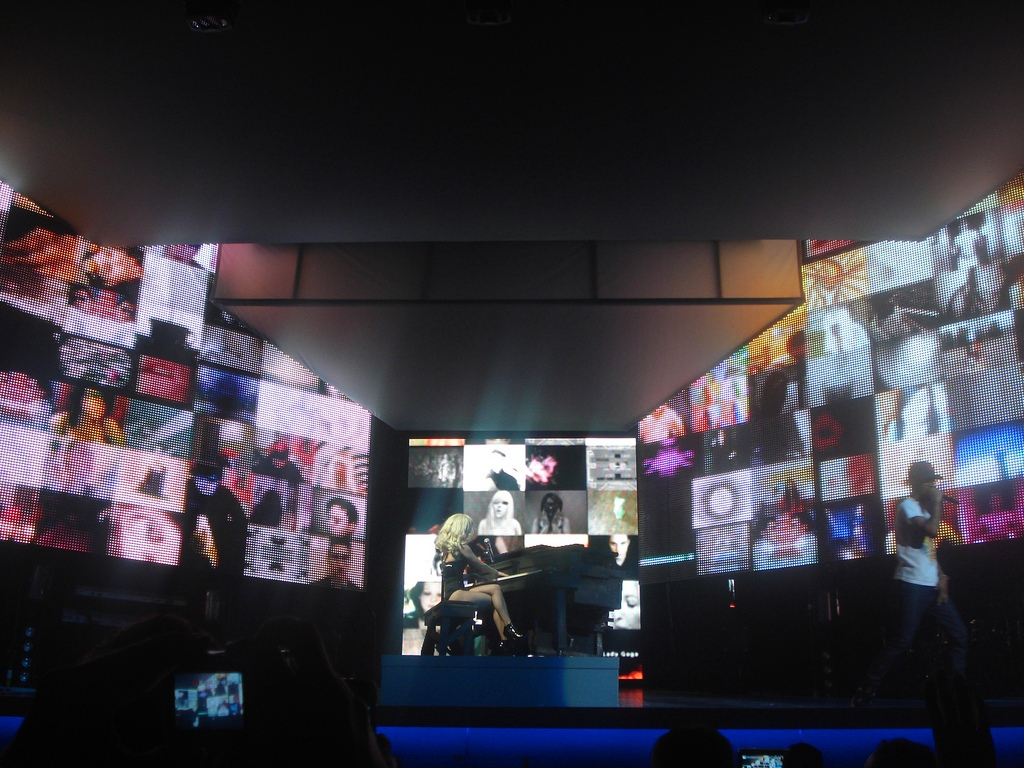
Lady Gaga and Cudi performing a piano version of "Poker Face" and "Make Her Say" on The Monster Ball Tour in November 2009

Headlining

- The Great Hangover Tour (with Asher Roth and B.o.B) (2009)
- The Cud Life Tour (2011, 2013)
- The Especial Tour (2016)
- Passion, Pain & Demon Slayin' Tour (2017)
- To the Moon World Tour (2022)
- The Rebel Ragers Tour (with M.I.A. and Big Boi) (2026) (Note: M.I.A was removed from the tour on May 4, 2026 after she made "offensive remarks" during a performance.)

Supporting

- Glow in the Dark Tour (with Kanye West) (2008)
- The Monster Ball Tour (with Lady Gaga) (2009)

== See also ==
- Kids See Ghosts
- WZRD
- List of artists who reached number one in the United States
- List of American Grammy Award winners and nominees
- List of neo-psychedelia artists
- List of alternative hip-hop artists
