= Baptized in Fire =

Song by Kid Cudi

Promotional single by Kid Cudi featuring Travis Scott

from the album Passion, Pain & Demon Slayin'
- Released: December 2, 2016
- Recorded: 2016
- Genre: Trap
- Length: 4:45
- Label: Republic; Wicked Awesome
- Songwriters: Scott Mescudi; Jacques Webster II; Michael Dean; Patrick Reynolds; Mort Garson
- Producers: Mike Dean; Plain Pat; Kid Cudi

"Baptized in Fire" is a song by American rapper Kid Cudi featuring fellow American rapper Travis Scott. It was released on December 1, 2016, as a promotional single from the former's sixth studio album, Passion, Pain & Demon Slayin' (2016). The song, which contains a sample of "Deja Vu" by Mort Garson, was produced by Mike Dean, Plain Pat and Kid Cudi. The song marked the third collaboration between Cudi and Scott, following the tracks "Way Back" and "Through the Late Night" from Scott’s album, Birds in the Trap Sing McKnight, also released in 2016.

== Release and promotion ==
On December 1, 2016, the album was made available for pre-order on the iTunes Store, with "Baptized in Fire" as the "instant gratification track". It was released to Google Play the following day.

== Critical reception ==
Adrian Marcano from Inverse named it as the fourth best song from the album and wrote that it "goes extra hard with a deep bassy twang that we hear on a lot of records that Travis is on". Noisey wrote: "The brooding track finds both artists showcasing their signature, crawling harmonies".

== Charts ==
Chart (2016)	Peak position
US Bubbling Under Hot 100 (Billboard)	3
US Hot R&B/Hip-Hop Songs (Billboard)	47

== Release history ==
Country	Date	Format	Label
United States	December 2, 2016	Digital download; streaming	Republic; Wicked Awesome
