= A Man Named Scott =

- Promotional poster
- Directed by: Robert Alexander
- Produced by: Christopher Noviello; Brandon Riley
- Starring: Kid Cudi
- Cinematography: Nathan Salter
- Edited by: Freddie DeLaVega; Joseph Volpe
- Music by: Nathan Matthew David
- Production companies: Mad Solar; Film 45
- Distributed by: Amazon Studios
- Release date: November 5, 2021
- Running time: 95 minutes
- Country: United States
- Language: English

A Man Named Scott is a 2021 documentary film centered on American musician and actor Scott Mescudi, better known as Kid Cudi. Directed by Robert Alexander, it was released on Amazon Prime Video on November 5, 2021. The title of the film, which is reminiscent of Cudi's 2008 breakout mixtape A Kid Named Cudi, is borrowed from his scrapped 2011 mixtape of the same name.

== Summary ==
The film follows the career of Kid Cudi (born Scott Mescudi), beginning with the release of his influential 2009 debut album Man on the Moon: The End of Day, which featured songs that dealt with depression, anxiety and loneliness. The film explores his creative process over the past decade, as well as his struggles and breakthroughs.

== Cast ==
- Scott Mescudi
- Kanye West
- Timothée Chalamet
- Shia LaBeouf
- Willow Smith
- Jaden Smith
- Lil Yachty
- Pharrell Williams
- ASAP Rocky
- Schoolboy Q
- Polo G

== Production ==
Robert Alexander directed the film,, while Nathan Matthew David composed the score.

== Release ==
The promotional trailer for the film was released on October 26, 2021. The film was released on Prime Video on November 5, 2021.

== Reception ==
Chris Azzopardi of The New York Times wrote, "This film about Kid Cudi is that rare musician-focused documentary, one as sensitive, fully formed and noble in its intentions as the artist himself."

Jude Dry of IndieWire wrote that the film "rightfully highlights Cudi's contribution to culture as an emotional truth teller," but added that it "lacks the artistic vision of Cudi's musical talents, despite its best efforts."

Lovia Gyarkye of The Hollywood Reporter commented on how the film's ending would “start to feel like forced attempts at profundity, as if Cudi's testimony alone hasn't always been enough.”
