= Surfin' (Kid Cudi song) =

2016 single by Kid Cudi featuring Pharrell Williams

Single by Kid Cudi featuring Pharrell Williams

from the album Passion, Pain & Demon Slayin'
- Released: September 30, 2016
- Recorded: 2016
- Genre: Pop rap
- Length: 3:58 (single version); 6:15 (album version)
- Label: Republic; Wicked Awesome
- Songwriters: Scott Mescudi; Pharrell Williams
- Producer: Pharrell Williams

Kid Cudi singles chronology
"Frequency" (2016)	"Surfin'" (2016)	"Leader of the Delinquents" (2020)

Pharrell Williams singles chronology
"Safari" (2016)	"Surfin'" (2016)	"Heatstroke" (2017)

Music video
- "Surfin'" on YouTube

"Surfin'" is a song by American rapper Kid Cudi. It was released on September 30, 2016, as the lead single from his sixth studio album, Passion, Pain & Demon Slayin'. The song was written alongside Pharrell Williams, who also makes a vocal appearance on the extended outro of the album version of the song. The song was later included on Cudi's first greatest hits album The Boy Who Flew to the Moon, Vol. 1 (2022).

== Release and composition ==
The song was released alongside "Frequency", for download as dual singles on September 30, 2016. "Surfin'" runs for a duration of three minutes and 58 seconds. The album version of the song runs for a length of six minutes and 15 seconds. Vulture.com called Pharrell's production "sunny, upbeat electronic brass". The song bears elements of African drums, with a styling of sea shanties. After five minutes of rapping between a chorus with A-A rhyme scheme, Cudi closes out the track and the album with 15 seconds of a capella yodeling.

== Music video ==
The music video for the song, directed by Cudi himself, premiered on October 31, 2016, via his Vevo. The video features cameo appearances from King Chip, Jaden and Willow Smith, A$AP Nast and A$AP Rocky, and others.

== In other media ==
In 2017, "Surfin'" was featured in a television advertisement issued by Adidas. The song was also featured in season three of HBO's series Ballers. It was also featured in the 2017 video games NBA Live Mobile and NBA Live 18 The One. The song was also featured in the TV series Inhumans. The instrumental was also used in the TV series How to Get Away with Murder.

== Charts ==
Chart (2016)	Peak position
Australia (ARIA)	77
