= Frequency (Kid Cudi song) =

2016 promotional single by Kid Cudi

Single by Kid Cudi

from the album Passion, Pain & Demon Slayin'
- Released: September 30, 2016
- Recorded: 2016
- Genre: Hip hop; progressive rap
- Length: 4:58
- Label: Republic; Wicked Awesome
- Songwriters: Scott Mescudi; Michael Dean; Patrick Reynolds
- Producers: Mike Dean; Plain Pat; Kid Cudi

Kid Cudi singles chronology
"Confused!" (2015)	"Frequency" (2016)	"Surfin'" (2016)

"Frequency" (previously titled "The Frequency") is a song recorded by American rapper Kid Cudi. It was released on September 30, 2016, as the first single from his sixth studio album, Passion, Pain & Demon Slayin' (2016). The song was written and produced by Mike Dean, Plain Pat and Kid Cudi.

== Release and composition ==
"Frequency" originally premiered on Cudi's SoundCloud account on March 25, 2016, but was released for digital download on September 30, 2016. It is the first offering from his sixth studio album, Passion, Pain & Demon Slayin', which was released on December 16, 2016. "Frequency" runs for a duration of four minutes and fifty-eight seconds. It was described as "a low-key hip-hop ballad" by Rolling Stone reviewer Elias Leight.

== Critical reception ==
Ryan Middleton of Music Times gave the song a positive review, saying "it has the spacey, stoner sound that fans loved from the Cudi on his first couple of albums". Fuse's Tyler Lauletta wrote that "the song is a return to form for Cudi, with shout-outs to women and psychedelic drugs in his signature sultry tone". Chico from Respect. wrote that Cudi "hums, sings and even lyrically dances all over this one, like we always knew he could". C. Vernon Coleman II of XXL wrote; "The dreamy production is highlighted by odd sound effects and spaced out chords".

== Music video ==
The music video for the song, directed by Cudi himself, premiered on October 12, 2016, via his Vevo channel. The five-minute video features Cudi performing the song shirtless in a dark jungle. It also shows him having a threesome in a mushroom cave. Peter A. Berry of XXL wrote that the video is "simultaneously dark and colorful, much like the music Cudi’s provided for fans over the last eight years". The Boombox's Jacinta Howard called the video "dark and artistic", while Rap-Up called it "dark and smoky". Elisabeth Brier from Uproxx wrote; "It’s a sort of R-rated Wonderland. That’s perhaps the best way to describe the world depicted in Kid Cudi‘s new music video for "Frequency"." Pigeons & Planes named it as one of the best music videos released in October 2016.
