= Insano =

Insano may refer to:

- Insano (Kid Cudi album), 2024
  - Insano (Nitro Mega), 2024
- Insano (waterslide)
