= Speedin' Bullet 2 Heaven =

Studio album by Kid Cudi
- Released: December 4, 2015
- Studios: Chalice (Los Angeles); Conway (Los Angeles); Henson (Los Angeles); Red Barn (Big Sur)
- Genres: Alternative rock; grunge; indie rock; punk rock; lo-fi
- Length: 91:22
- Labels: Republic; Wicked Awesome
- Producers: Kid Cudi; Plain Pat

Kid Cudi chronology
Satellite Flight: The Journey to Mother Moon (2014)	Speedin' Bullet 2 Heaven (2015)	Passion, Pain & Demon Slayin' (2016)

Singles from Speedin' Bullet 2 Heaven
- 1. "Confused!" Released: August 1, 2015; 2. "Speedin' Bullet 2 Heaven" Released: December 2, 2015

Speedin' Bullet 2 Heaven is the fifth studio album by the American musician Kid Cudi, released on December 4, 2015, through Republic Records and Cudi's Wicked Awesome Records imprint. Announced in April 2015 and completed in October of that year, it was primarily produced by Cudi, with Plain Pat co-producing four of its tracks. It was released as a 26-track double album, consisting of the main album ("Side A") and 8 bonus tracks of demos and outtakes ("Side B").

An alternative rock, grunge, indie rock, punk rock and lo-fi album, Speedin' Bullet 2 Heaven marked a departure from the hip-hop sound of Cudi's previous albums, with music critics drawing comparisons to Nirvana and Cudi's previous rock music project WZRD. Its tracks are interspersed by four skits featuring Mike Judge voicing the titular characters of his animated sitcom, Beavis and Butt-Head. Lyrically, the album explores themes of mental health, depression, alienation, self-harm, anger, and suicidal thoughts. Cudi would later call the period surrounding the writing and recording of Speedin' Bullet 2 Heaven one of his darkest times, stating that he was struggling with cocaine addiction and suicidal thoughts and had planned for it to be his final album.

Speedin' Bullet 2 Heaven was promoted by two official singles, "Confused!" and the title track. Cudi was due to embark on the Especial Tour from November to December 2015; following its first show, he cancelled and later rescheduled the tour dates to January to March 2016. The album debuted at number 36 on the US Billboard 200 chart with first week sales of 19,000 album-equivalent units, falling below those of his previous albums. It also received mixed reviews from critics, who criticized its songwriting and performances. Due to its poor reception, Cudi delayed his plans to release the third installment of his Man on the Moon trilogy in favour of his next album, Passion, Pain & Demon Slayin' (2016).

== Background and recording ==
In October 2013, Kid Cudi announced that he would be releasing the long-awaited third and final part of his Man on the Moon series in 2015, with an extended play (EP) due to follow as a "prelude" between his third album Indicud (2013) and the album. By January 2014, Cudi had expanded the EP into an album, which he surprise released the following month as Satellite Flight: The Journey to Mother Moon. In January 2015, he hinted at the possibility of releasing another album before Man on the Moon III in an interview with Billboard at the Sundance Film Festival. On April 4, 2015, Cudi announced on Twitter that his next album, titled Speedin' Bullet 2 Heaven, would be "coming really really soon". Later that month, he confirmed the album would not be a surprise release.

On April 10, 2015, the American drummer Travis Barker revealed he was in the studio with Kid Cudi and praised his upcoming album. On May 25, 2015, Cudi announced that Speedin' Bullet 2 Heaven would have no guest features. On July 4, 2015, Cudi reported the album to be "98% finished" and said that its first single would be released by the end of the month. He also stated that it would "consist of all guitar and bass", though later clarified that drums and electric guitar would appear on most of its tracks. A week after tweeting that he was finalizing the album's tracklisting, Cudi confirmed the album's release date on October 27, 2015.

Speedin' Bullet 2 Heaven was recorded at Chalice, Conway and Henson Recording Studios in Los Angeles, and Red Barn Recording Studios in Big Sur. Cudi produced the entire album himself and performed all of its bass and guitar parts; he said that the album contained no "synths or electronic sounds" and that the only other person involved in its production was Plain Pat. Cudi avoided using click tracks and quantization, and recorded everything using two-inch tape "for a richer and warmer sound quality". Dennis Cummings, Cudi's manager, was given an executive producer credit.

== Composition ==
=== Overview ===
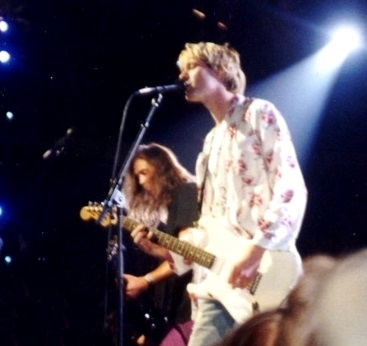
Music critics compared Speedin' Bullet 2 Heaven to Nirvana (pictured); Kid Cudi also credited the documentary film Kurt Cobain: Montage of Heck (2015) with inspiring the album.

Speedin' Bullet 2 Heaven is a 26-track double album, with its first disc ("Side A") containing the main, 18-track album and the second ("Side B") containing 8 bonus tracks of demos and outtakes. Musically, the album marked a departure from the hip-hop sound of Cudi's previous albums. Music critics predominately described it as alternative rock, grunge, indie rock, punk rock and lo-fi. Cudi described the album as "alternative". Cudi employs singing, groaning, and crooning throughout the album, and applies Auto-Tune to his vocals on "Melting". According to Chris Mench of Complex, its songs lack traditional structures and "end up feeling more like unfiltered bursts of emotion". Kris Ex of Billboard writes that Cudi "differentiates things raging up and down emotional scales, mores than musical ones [sic]." Its tracks are interspersed by four skits featuring Mike Judge voicing the titular characters of his animated sitcom, Beavis and Butt-Head.

Adam Isaac Kintoff of The Source and HotNewHipHop's Maxwell Cavaseno compared Speedin' Bullet 2 Heaven's direction to WZRD, Cudi's previous rock music project with Dot da Genius, and its 2012 debut album. Ex viewed the album as more of a stylistic "hard left turn" for Cudi than a departure in light of this. Matthew Ramirez of Pitchfork considered it to be a more "unfiltered and unpolished" album compared to WZRD, a sentiment also shared by David Jefferies of AllMusic, who described its production as "minimal". Mench and Chris Tart, also of HotNewHipHop, compared the album to the American rock band Nirvana. In discussing the album, Cavaseno mentioned Cudi's past admiration for the band's frontman Kurt Cobain, whom is given a shout out on "Man in the Night". In 2024, Cudi credited the Brett Morgen documentary film Kurt Cobain: Montage of Heck (2015) with inspiring Speedin' Bullet 2 Heaven and "[expanding his] mind as an artist." Darryl Sterdan of the Toronto Sun also viewed the album as Cudi's "answer to Montage of Heck".

I was the darkest—I was darker than Man on the Moon II. I felt like I was living the right way, but I still felt empty inside. People look up to me, but I'm not a happy person. So a lot of the time, I felt like a fraud, and that's what drove me to the dark side of what I was dealing with.

— Kid Cudi discussing Speedin' Bullet 2 Heaven in A Man Named Scott (2021)

Lyrically, Speedin' Bullet 2 Heaven explores themes of mental health, depression, alienation, self-harm, anger, and suicidal thoughts. Prior to its release, Cudi dedicated the album to "everyone strugglin with mental disorder all around the world." Compared to those from his earlier albums, which "focused on escape on terrestrial terms", Ex described its themes as "more internal—the flight is more about Cudi breaking free from his mortal coil than anything around him." Mench writes that the lyrics illustrate Cudi's personal struggles "in alarming sonic clarity" and that the album often "feels like Cudi forcefully exorcizing the demons from his head". Cudi would later call the period surrounding the writing and recording of Speedin' Bullet 2 Heaven one of his darkest times, more than that of Man on the Moon II: The Legend of Mr. Rager (2010), and described the album as a "cry for help". In his eponymous 2025 memoir, Cudi stated that he was struggling with suicidal thoughts and cocaine addiction during the album's production and had planned for it to be his last: "There's a song at the end of Speedin' Bullet where I say goodbye [...] I was going to kill myself at the end of that album, or before it came out, or during that cycle. I was not planning to live that year [(2015)]. Not many people around me expected me to either."

=== Songs ===
"Confused!"
The album's lead single sees sees Cudi "pondering huge questions" and desiring inner peace over post-punk guitar and clicking percussion.

"Handle with Care"
"Handle with Care" is an acoustic number that sees Cudi warning women against dating him.

"Speedin Bullet 2 Heaven"
On the album's title track, Cudi softly sings about manic depression over a "nostalgic" breakbeat.

Speedin' Bullet 2 Heaven opens with "Edge of the Earth/Post Mortem Boredom", which Mench describes as a "folksy, mesmerizing tune". "Confused!" sees Cudi "pondering huge questions" and desiring inner peace over post-punk guitar and clicking percussion. Cudi likened the song to "smiling with a knife to my wrist" due to the dissonance of its melody and lyrics. Featuring an "aggressive guitar riff", "Man in the Night" recalls the "lofi, mid-tempo guitar-driven" sound of The Velvet Underground. On "Screwed", Cudi croons over "carefully plucked" guitar chords, per Mench. Troy L. Smith of Cleveland.com highlighted the song's "punk and grunge tendencies". "Fade 2 Red" centers around a looping, droning riff and "shout-sing[ing]" vocals from Cudi, whose lyrics Adam Kivel of Consequence described as "mashed together with unrhymed lines about dealing with idiots." "Adventures", which Ex described as a "drug trip ode", is among the few tracks on Speedin' Bullet 2 Heaven to display hip-hop influences. Cavaseno compared the song's mix of rock, hip-hop and electronica to the early demo works of TV on the Radio. Cudi said "The Nothing" is about "addiction, [and] the hauntings of it. Calling us." Cavaseno and Tart respectively compared the song's music to Sebadoh and the Deftones. It features stream-of-consciousness lyrics that reference the nursery rhyme "Mary, Mary Quite Contrary". "Handle with Care" is an acoustic number that sees Cudi warning women against dating him. Over a "despondent" melody, he confesses that his "delicate heart" is "essential to his capacity to love and at the same time a liability in terms of his behavior", according to The Hollywood Reporter's Lovia Gyarkye.

"Judgemental Cunt" features a "classic stoner stomp" and sees Cudi break his voice while screaming. Kivel described the song as "a middle finger to the people hating on him", though Smith and Ramirez saw its lyrics as self-critical. Tart viewed "Séance Chaos" and "Angered Kids" as worshipping the hardcore punk of Bad Brains. Jefferies described "Fairy Tale Remains" as sounding like "Death Grips [attempting] to make a My Bloody Valentine album" without "the chops". "Wedding Tux" is an acoustic song featuring a "warm" and "entrancing" two-chord pattern. Cudi's lyrics describe how he is treated like "rotting meat" by his girlfriend and his memories are being eaten by maggots. Tart compared its "absolutely miserable" vibes to those of Elliott Smith. On the album's title track, Cudi softly sings about manic depression over a "nostalgic" breakbeat, per Ramirez. Mench compared the song and "Insides Out" to Cudi's earlier songs "All Along" and "Mr. Rager". The title track also appears as an acoustic demo at the end of "Side B". Mench described "Embers" as "a fever-dream of quiet existentialism". Kivel compared the "groaning-over-acoustic-guitar" song "The Return of Chip Douglas" to a joke warm-up by Gordon Gano at a Violent Femmes rehearsal.

== Release and promotion ==
On May 12, 2015, Cudi posted a low-quality preview of a song via his Twitter account, which he quickly deleted. On August 1, 2015, he released "Confused!" as the lead single from Speedin' Bullet 2 Heaven. According to Alex Siber of Complex, initial reactions to the song on social media were varied, with comments on Twitter and Facebook "suggest[ing] disappointment". On September 29, 2015, he revealed that it would be released as a double album. On October 3, 2015, following delays related to iTunes and his record label, Cudi released two new songs, "Wedding Tux" and "Judgmental Cunt", on his SoundCloud page. On November 13, 2015, Cudi revealed the track listing to the album's first disc (Side A). Four days later, he unveiled its cover art.

Cudi was due to embark on a concert tour of the United States, the Especial Tour, from November 30 to December 22, 2015. Following its first show in Denver, Cudi cancelled the rest of the tour for various reasons, such as production and personal issues. He wrote: "I got a lot I'm dealing with at this time in my personal life too and in order for the shows to be the best experience possible as well as keeping my sanity intact, I need to regroup. I have to." To make up for postponing the concert tour, Cudi released the album's title track as the second single the following day. On January 5, 2016, he released an acoustic version of "Confused!". The Especial Tour dates were later rescheduled to January 31 to March 12, 2016.

Speedin' Bullet 2 Heaven was first released through digital music platforms on December 4, 2015, with its physical release arriving on December 18. The album sold 19,365 album equivalent units in its first week, 14,210 of which were from pure album sales, to debut at number 36 on the US Billboard 200 chart. It was Kid Cudi's first album to not chart within the top 10, and its sales and chart positions fell below those of his previous albums. Mench said it was the "first true flop of his career". The album was reissued on cassette in 2016, and on vinyl in 2025.

== Critical reception ==
Speedin' Bullet 2 Heaven ratings
Aggregate scores
Source	Rating
Metacritic	44/100
Review scores
Source	Rating
AllMusic	2.5/5 stars
Billboard	4/5 stars
Cleveland.com	C−
Complex	2.5/5 stars
Consequence	D+
HipHopDX	2/5
HotNewHipHop	68%
The Needle Drop	0/10
Pitchfork	4.0/10
Toronto Sun	3.5/5

Publications described the critical consensus of Speedin' Bullet 2 Heaven as mixed, negative, or polarizing. (Note: Reception: Mixed: Negative: Polarizing:) On the review aggregator website Metacritic, the album holds a score of 44 out of 100, based on reviews from five critics, which indicates "mixed or average reviews".

Smith of Cleveland.com called the album "a poor man's Yeezus – a baffling case of experimentation without any of the sonic depth." Kivel of Consequence criticized its formulaic songwriting, "ultra-repetitive guitar riffs" and skits, though he commended the "passion and intensity" at which its ideas were presented. Although he found it sonically "strong", Jason Bisnof of HipHopDX felt that the album was lacking in identity and believed many of its songs were "repetitive and better suited for a singer and a voice more typical to [rock music]." Bisnof also deemed it creatively inferior to Cudi's first two albums, Man on the Moon: The End of Day (2009) and Man on the Moon II: The Legend of Mr. Rager, stating: "For many artists or rock groups this would show pieces of strong artistry, but for the man behind two of the best albums of the last decade, it seems like yet another identity crisis on wax".

Jeffries of AllMusic felt that Speedin' Bullet 2 Heaven would only appeal to Kid Cudi's hardcore fanbase, whilst "outsiders" would perceive the album as "sloppy and confused". Cavaseno of HotNewHipHop anticipated that the varying quality of Cudi's musicianship, its length, "raw" songs, and skits, would make the album a difficult listen for both listeners and fans. Ramirez of Pitchfork called the album dated and self-indulgent and compared it to "a comedian bombing onstage trying to will it into performance art". Anthony Fantano of The Needle Drop gave the album a zero out of ten, calling it "the musical equivalent to just a mile of hot coal walking" and the worst album he had reviewed in 2015. Fantano's review led to the album becoming the subject of memes.

Vice's Adam Downer considered Speedin' Bullet 2 Heaven to be a work of "so bad it's good" art, comparing it to Tommy Wiseau's 2003 film The Room. In a review for Complex, Mench thought it was messier and more challenging than Cudi's previous work but felt it had "admirably unique" qualities. Ex of Billboard found the album "uncomfortably internal" but nevertheless "a pleasurable listen"; he overall felt on the album, Cudi is "more exposed than ever, and perhaps all the better for it". The album was praised by several of Cudi's peers, including Erykah Badu, Kanye West, and André 3000. ASAP Rocky later named it his favorite Kid Cudi album, stating: "Sometimes you make your dopest shit in the darkest place."

In 2018, Gus Fisher of HotNewHipHop suggested that the negative reception to Speedin' Bullet 2 Heaven was a "glaring [example] of the music media immediately shutting down Black artists for stepping outside of the confines of what is deemed as 'Black music.' " The following year, Cyclone Wehrer of The Music viewed the album as being worthy of reassessment, praising it as "rudimentary, but spirited" and claiming Cudi "rejuvenated rap-rock". In 2021, Jordan Darville of The Fader said that despite the criticism Cudi received for transitioning from hip-hop to grunge with the album, "one could argue that it paved the way for young Black artists to embrace the genre." XXL offered a less favorable reassessment in a 2022 listicle covering "Hip-Hop Albums That Didn't Live Up to the Hype", in which it described the album's songs as lacking "enough oomph to make them remarkable" and remarked that although "Day-one Cudi fans would argue that [the album] wasn't nearly as bad as people make it out to be", fans that "[knew] the full extent of his artistic talent […] would say otherwise." In 2024, Mosi Reeves of Rolling Stone dismissed the album as "bland, Afropunk-baiting alt-rock".

== Aftermath ==
In an April 2016 interview with Billboard, Cudi said that he would no longer be releasing Man on the Moon III after Speedin' Bullet 2 Heaven. He said that the response to the album "tore [him] up" and that its poor commercial performance led him to "[question his] fan base and if I even have one at all"; at the same time, he considered it to be "the best thing to happen" to him in 2015. The following month, Cudi claimed that the album was ahead of its time and believed its impact would be seen in at least five years. In 2016, Cudi released his sixth album, Passion, Pain & Demon Slayin', which Uproxx described as a "musical mea culpa" for Speedin' Bullet 2 Heaven. Cudi later revealed that the album was intended to be Man on the Moon III but wanted to "be in a better place" when he ultimately released the final installment of his trilogy, which arrived in 2020. In 2022, "Confused!" and "Speedin' Bullet 2 Heaven" were included in Cudi's first greatest hits compilation, The Boy Who Flew to the Moon, Vol. 1. Cudi's 2025 single "Neverland" was described by HipHopDX and Uproxx as recalling Speedin' Bullet 2 Heaven; the former considered it to be one of his "most experimental songs" since the album.

== Track listing ==
All songs are written by Scott Mescudi; all songs are produced by Mescudi, except where noted.

Side A
No.	Title	Producer(s)	Length
1.	"Edge of the Earth/Post Mortem Boredom"		4:43
2.	"Confused!"		3:56
3.	"Man in the Night"		3:50
4.	"Screwed"		2:27
5.	"Fade 2 Red"		2:57
6.	"Adventures"	Scott Mescudi; Patrick Reynolds	6:10
7.	"The Nothing"		3:30
8.	"Amen"	Mescudi; Reynolds	3:04
9.	"Handle with Care"		3:45
10.	"Judgemental Cunt"		3:05
11.	"Séance Chaos"		1:53
12.	"Fairy Tale Remains"		3:06
13.	"Wedding Tux"		2:32
14.	"Angered Kids"	Mescudi; Reynolds	3:31
15.	"Red Sabbath"		4:38
16.	"Fuchsia Butterflies"		2:45
17.	"Speedin' Bullet 2 Heaven"	Mescudi; Reynolds	4:34
18.	"Embers"		3:00
Total length:			63:26

Side B
No.	Title	Length
1.	"Anomaly" (Rehearsal Demo)	4:34
2.	"The Return of Chip Douglas" (Demo)	4:15
3.	"Trauma"	2:44
4.	"Wait!" (Rehearsal Demo)	1:58
5.	"Insides Out"	3:07
6.	"Speedin' Bullet 2 Heaven" (Acoustic Demo)	3:24
7.	"Worth"	5:17
8.	"Melting"	2:37
Total length:		27:56

Notes

- All Beavis and Butt-Head interludes written by Scott Mescudi and Mike Judge.
- "Confused!", "Amen", "Wait!" and "Melting" are stylized in all caps.

== Personnel ==
Credits for Speedin' Bullet 2 Heaven adapted from liner notes.

- Scott Mescudi – vocals, guitars, bass, production, executive producer, art direction, creative art
- Oladipo Omishore – bass (B4)
- Mike Moore – live drums (A2, A3, A5, A8, A11, A12, A14, B1, B4)

Production

- Patrick Reynolds – production (A6, A8, A14, A17)
- Dennis Cummings – executive producer
- Iain Findlay – engineer (A3–5, A9, A15, A18, B3–6), mixing (A18, B3, B4, B8)
- Anthony Kilhoffer – engineer (A1, A2, A6–8, A10–14, A16, A17, B1, B2, B7, B8) mixing (A1–17, B1, B2, B5–7)
- Gavin Lurssen – mastering

Studios

- Chalice Recording Studios – recording (A3, A5, A9, A15, A18, B4, B5, B7), mixing (A2, A5, A6, A8, A10, B7)
- Conway Recording Studios – recording (A1, A2, A10, A13), mixing (A1, A3)
- Henson Recording Studios – recording (A4, A8, A11, A12, A14, A16, A17, B1–3, B6, B8), mixing (A4, A7, A9, A11–18, B1–6, B8)
- Red Barn Recording Studios – recording (A1, A2, A6, A10)

Artwork

- Sandy Brummels – creative art
- Vada Mescudi – City Heart sculpture, Daddy portrait
- Kyledidthis – art direction

== Charts ==
Chart performance for Speedin' Bullet 2 Heaven
Chart (2015)	Peak position
US Billboard 200	36
US Top Rock Albums (Billboard)	5
US Top Alternative Albums (Billboard)	3

== Release history ==
Release dates and formats for Speedin' Bullet 2 Heaven
Region	Date	Label(s)	Format(s)	Ref.
Various	December 4, 2015	Digital download; streaming	Republic; Wicked Awesome	
United States	December 18, 2015	2×CD	Republic; Wicked Awesome	
United States	March 2016	CS	Republic; Wicked Awesome	
United States	June 6, 2025	2×LP	Republic; Wicked Awesome	
