= Confused! =

Single by Kid Cudi

from the album Speedin' Bullet 2 Heaven
- Released: August 1, 2015
- Recorded: 2015
- Studio: Conway (Los Angeles); Red Barn (Big Sur)
- Genre: Grunge
- Length: 3:56
- Label: Wicked Awesome; Republic
- Songwriter: Scott Mescudi
- Producer: Kid Cudi

Kid Cudi singles chronology
"Girls" (2013)	"Confused!" (2015)	"Frequency" (2016)

"Confused!" (stylized in all caps) is a song written and recorded by American musician Kid Cudi, taken from his fifth studio album Speedin' Bullet 2 Heaven (2015). The song was officially released on August 1, 2015 as the album's lead single. The song features production, guitar and bass from Cudi.

== Background and release ==
On April 4, 2015, Cudi announced via Twitter that he would soon be releasing a new album titled Speedin' Bullet 2 Heaven, prior to Man on the Moon III. When speaking on the album in early July 2015, Cudi stated: "This album is 100% the purest form of my artistic self". He also added: "I've ripped my heart out and carved it into tiny pieces of musical madness". On August 6, 2015, Cudi dedicated the album to "everyone struggling with mental disorder all around the world." On July 4, Cudi gave an update on the project, which he announced would be entirely self-produced (with some assistance from Plain Pat), as well as hinting towards a rock album, when he revealed there would be a complete absence of electronic sounds, as the instrumentals will consist entirely of his own guitar and bass playing.

On July 4, 2015, Cudi announced a single for the album would be released "before the end of the month." The single, titled "Confused!", was released on August 1, 2015. On September 29, 2015, Cudi released the cover art for "Confused", which he designed himself. On October 2, 2015, Cudi released two new songs, "Wedding Tux" and "Judgmental Cunt". The songs were originally supposed to be released on iTunes, in a single pack, along with "Confused", however the iTunes release failed to materialize, forcing Cudi to release it via his official SoundCloud page.

On January 5, 2016, Cudi released an acoustic version of the song via his official SoundCloud account, which he recorded in one take. The original song was later included on Cudi's first greatest hits album The Boy Who Flew to the Moon, Vol. 1 (2022).

== Critical reception ==
"Confused!"
The album's lead single contains confessional, stream-of-consciousness songwriting. Cudi intones ponderous rhymes over post-punk guitar and clicking percussion.

Upon release, Dean Van Nguyen of NME wrote "Featuring a heavy, grunge-like guitar riff, the track continues Cudi’s recent move away from his alt-hip-hop origins towards a more rock-orientated sound," referring to his 2012 collaborative effort WZRD, which was also a departure from his previous work. David Jeffries of AllMusic noted "For outsiders, ‘Confused!’ is the track to pick, as it sticks in the head with the ‘Who am I? Who are we?/All I want is to feel complete’ chorus, and then resonates with ‘I hate the drugs but I love the numb.’"

B.R. of the Urban Daily wrote "‘Confused!’ still finds Kid Cudi in his rock star lane, pushing his sobered, dry vocals over a simplistic chord progression. He’s still straying away from hip-hop, but this single is far more accessible than his work on Satellite Flight. ‘Confused’ is a personal track, too: ‘I hate the drugs but I love the numb/ I hate the gun but I want the sun.’" Brennan Carley of Spin wrote "It's much in line with the sound the rapper's been carving out the past couple of years – drawling singing atop melancholic, head-in-hands melodies – but he sounds totally on his game here."

== Live performances ==
Kid Cudi provided a live rendition of "Confused!" on August 1, 2015 during his set at the Lollapalooza music festival.

== Release history ==
Country	Date	Format	Label
United States	August 1, 2015	Digital download	Republic Records
