= Girls (Kid Cudi song) =

2013 single by Kid Cudi

Single by Kid Cudi featuring Too Short

from the album Indicud
- Released: April 2, 2013
- Recorded: 2012
- Genre: Alternative hip hop; synth-pop
- Length: 4:27
- Label: Wicked Awesome; GOOD Music; Republic
- Songwriters: Scott Mescudi; Todd Shaw; Dion Norman; D. Ordogne; Carl Brown; Shelly Goodhope; Tanesa Tavin; Daniel Brattain; Veronica Mendez; Darrell Mitchell; Albert Cota; Chantel Roquemore; Michael Monagan
- Producer: Scott Mescudi

Kid Cudi singles chronology
"Immortal" (2013)	"Girls" (2013)	"Confused!" (2015)

Too Short singles chronology
"First Date" (2012)	"Girls" (2013)	"Loyal" (2013)

"Girls" is a song by American hip hop recording artist Kid Cudi, released on April 2, 2013, as the fourth single from his third studio album Indicud (2013). The song, which includes production by Cudi himself, features a guest appearance from fellow American rapper Too $hort. The song has since peaked at #3 on the Billboard Bubbling Under Hot 100 Singles.

== Background ==
On April 2, 2013, "Girls" was released for digital download via the iTunes Store, as the album's fourth single. The song features a guest verse from American dirty rap legend Too Short. Additionally, the song was produced by Cudi himself, much like the bulk of Indicud. The song would later be released to Rhythm/Crossover radio on April 9, 2013. "Girls" contains an interpolation of "Pretty Girls", written by The Kids of Widney High (Carl Brown, Shelly Goodhope, Tanesa Tavin, Daniel Brattain, Veronica Mendez, Darrell Mitchell, Albert Cota, Chantel Roquemore and Michael Monagan). The song also contains a sample of "Bitches (Reply)", as performed by Dion "DJ Jimi" Norman.

== Charts ==
Chart (2013)	Peak position
US Bubbling Under Hot 100 Singles (Billboard)	3
US Hot R&B/Hip-Hop Songs (Billboard)	37

== Release history ==
Country	Date	Format	Label
United States	April 2, 2013	Digital download	GOOD Music, Republic
United States	April 9, 2013	Rhythmic contemporary radio	GOOD Music, Republic
