= Immortal (Kid Cudi song) =

2013 single by Kid Cudi

Single by Kid Cudi

from the album Indicud
- Released: March 14, 2013
- Recorded: 2012
- Genre: Trip hop; alternative hip hop; rap rock
- Length: 5:02
- Label: GOOD Music; Universal Republic
- Songwriters: Scott Mescudi; Andrew VanWyngarden; Ben Goldwasser
- Producer: Kid Cudi

Kid Cudi singles chronology
| "King Wizard" (2012) | "Immortal" (2013) | "Girls" (2013) |

Audio sample
- "Immortal": file; help

Music video
- "Immortal" on YouTube

"Immortal" is a song by American hip hop recording artist Kid Cudi, released on March 14, 2013, as the third official single from his third studio album Indicud (2013). The song, produced by Cudi himself, samples "Congratulations", as performed by MGMT, with whom Cudi had collaborated on his 2010 single "Pursuit of Happiness". On March 26, 2013, Cudi appeared on Jimmy Kimmel Live! and performed "Immortal", as well as "Just What I Am", on the late-night talk show.

== Background ==
On October 29, 2012, Cudi announced he would be releasing the album's third single at the end of November. On November 7, he revealed the upcoming single's title to be "Immortal", and that it again was produced by himself like the two previous releases, "Just What I Am" and "King Wizard". He claimed the song "will make you feel amazing in the heart and soul." However, on November 30, he revealed "Immortal" would not be released until 2013. "Immortal" was ultimately premiered on March 1, 2013, via SoundCloud. The song was produced by Cudi, with the main sample being a track from one of his favorite bands, MGMT's "Congratulations". He reversed the song, sped it up, and produced over it. The song was officially released via iTunes on March 14, 2013.

The song also contains a quote from American actor Adam Sandler in his 1995 film Billy Madison: "That’s one of my favorite movies, man. From my childhood, straight up. I love Adam Sandler. Throughout the album I wanted to include clips from some of my favorite movies to kind of narrate the album a bit and liven it up and give it some personality." Cudi claimed the quote, which is "I am the smartest man alive!", expressed his feelings best when he had completed the song:

"That’s how I felt when I finished the song. 'Oh my God. It’s so good!' [Laughs] So there had to be a way that I could express myself. So I had to find some of my favorite quotes from my favorite movies. I put on Billy Madison and just watched that. There were so many lines that I picked that were great. But “I’m the smartest man alive!” resonated with me. And Adam Sandler is like a god to me. He’s so amazing. I just wanted to pay homage through song and let him know, like, 'You’re the shit!'"

== Charts ==
| Chart (2013) | Peak position |
|---|---|
| US Hot R&B/Hip-Hop Songs (Billboard) | 48 |

== Release history ==
| Country | Date | Format | Label |
|---|---|---|---|
| United States | March 14, 2013 | Digital download | Universal Republic |
