= KOWH =

KOWH may refer to:

- KTTE, a defunct radio station (90.1 FM) formerly licensed to serve Humboldt, Nebraska, United States, which held the call sign KOWH from 2014 to 2016
- KFXL-TV, a television station (channel 51) licensed to serve Lincoln, Nebraska, which held the call sign KOWH in 2006
- KCRO, a radio station (660 AM) licensed to serve Omaha, Nebraska, which held the call sign KOWH until 1979
- The Kids of Widney High, a group of special education singer/songwriters from Widney HS in Los Angeles
