= At the Party =

At the Party may refer to:

- "At the Party" (Kid Cudi song), 2023
- "At the Party" (Soulhead song), 2004
