= Insano (album) =

Studio album by Kid Cudi
- Released: January 12, 2024
- Recorded: 2021–2023
- Studios: Crosby recording Studios; EastWest Studios; Moon Man's Landing; Rue Boyer; Sarm Studios
- Genres: Hip-hop; trap
- Length: 64:00
- Labels: Wicked Awesome; Republic
- Producers: Kid Cudi; Anthony Kilhoffer; Bluskxy; Bnyx; C-Gutta; Cathedral; Census; Clams Casino; Cubeatz; Days of 1993; Dot da Genius; FnZ; Honorable C.N.O.T.E.; J Gramm; Jean-Baptiste; John Cunningham; Jonnywood; Justin Raisen; Keanu Beats; Lastnight; Lil CC; Lil Yachty; Luke; Karl Rubin; Keyon Christ; Kid Jupiter; Mike Zombie; Patrick Wimberly; Pharrell Williams; Plain Pat; Sadpony; Take a Daytrip; Thats Not It; theycallmeparker; Tom Levesque; WondaGurl; Wynne Bennett

Kid Cudi chronology
Entergalactic (2022)	Insano (2024)	Insano (Nitro Mega) (2024)

Alternate covers
- All four alternate covers

Singles from Insano
- 1. "Porsche Topless" Released: June 2, 2023; 2. "At the Party" Released: November 3, 2023

Insano (stylized in all caps) is the ninth studio album by American rapper Kid Cudi. It was released on January 12, 2024, via Wicked Awesome Records and Republic Records. Kid Cudi had initially announced this would be his last contractual album with Republic, the major-label he had been with since his commercial debut album, Man on the Moon: The End of Day (2009). The album follows his 2022 effort Entergalactic, which was accompanied by its visual component, an award-winning TV special of the same name.

The album, which features guest appearances from fellow American rappers Travis Scott, ASAP Rocky, Lil Yachty, Pharrell Williams, XXXTentacion, Lil Wayne, and Young Thug, also includes American hip hop disc jockey DJ Drama, narrating the album in a similar way to his famed Gangsta Grillz mixtape series. Production was handled by a variety of record producers, such as Cudi, Lil Yachty, and Williams themselves, alongside Plain Pat, Dot da Genius, Bnyx, Keyon Christ, and Mike Zombie, among others.

A hip hop and trap record, Insano was preceded by two singles, "Porsche Topless" and "At the Party", as well as two promotional singles, "Most Ain't Dennis" and "Ill What I Bleed". The album was followed by a sequel, titled Insano (Nitro Mega), released on February 23, 2024.

== Background ==
In September 2022, during an interview with Zane Lowe for Apple Music, Cudi implied that he's looking to pursue other ventures at least for the time being, "The Kid Cudi stuff, I think I want to put it on the back burner and chill out with that. I think, I want to be done with it. I think, closing the chapter on Kid Cudi." His desire to move on from releasing albums and touring was something that led to Entergalactic (2022), which he wanted to take a different approach with because he was "bored" of putting out more traditional releases. Cudi continued to tell Zane, "I've said a lot and I have other desires, I have other things I want to do. And I do not see me never making music, I'll always fuck around in the studio, or make something here and there. But, as far as getting in the studio and working on an album, and then going and touring it, I just don't have it in me."

In October 2022, during an episode of Hot Ones, Kid Cudi continued to hint at retiring from music when he revealed that he didn't know how much longer he would continue making albums. He continued to say he was "kinda nearing the end on all things Kid Cudi." He quoted other rappers, including Snoop Dogg, Jay-Z, Eminem and more, saying he didn't think he would have the same longevity as these artists. When mentioning alternate career paths Cudi said "I was thinking about this [...] wacky idea I had years ago. It would be cool to one day be a kindergarten teacher. Just do that for a couple years." On November 6, Cudi announced on Twitter he only has one more album left on his recording contract with Republic, revealing that he does not know what he will continue to do following the release.

On March 8, 2023, Cudi took to Instagram Live to continue to give updates regarding the album: "I've never made a project this powerful before in my life. And you know, sitting and listening to these mixes, I just know that this shit is going to move you. Y'all are going to fuck with this shit in such a major way, and I'm so fuckin' excited. I just want to get on here and let y'all know that I'm not gonna let y'all down. This is gonna be the album of the year right now. I'm not playing, this is not a fuckin' joke. Tell everybody you fuckin' know."

Kid Cudi
(@KidCudi)
tweeted:

If you need something to motivate u, to lift u up, Insano got u. Pure superhero music to soundtrack your life. Guaranteed.

May 7, 2023

On May 7, 2023, during an Instagram Live stream, Cudi revealed despite previous statements, he would not be retiring from music yet, and confirmed this would not be his last album. In the same stream, Cudi noted this album is "probably the first album I've ever made where I've been truly 100% happy".

On August 14, Cudi posted a video on Instagram to give an update on the album, where he said "I feel very very fucking confident that y'all gonna love this shit. I need y'all to understand that for years I've been kind of making my music and staying to myself and just being my creative weird self. Now I'm competing. Now I'm entering the race. 15 years, I've been doing this shit a long time."

== Recording and production ==
In an interview with Apple Music's Zane Lowe, Kid Cudi explained how watching fellow American rapper Kendrick Lamar perform in Paris on The Big Steppers Tour helped him realize what type of sonic direction he wanted to take for the follow-up to Entergalactic (2022). He told Lowe, "I took that inspiration, got to the studio and said, 'Let's fucking get to work. We need to make something with some energy. I'm happy, I'm in a better place in my life. I've never made an album in this type of mode before. Let's see what comes out of that.'" He went on to add, "So the album was truly designed for arenas, for the live show."

On May 20, 2021, Cudi previewed a song from an album he was working on via his Instagram story, unveiling a snippet of a song tentatively titled "Wow". During his 2021 headlining performance at the Rolling Loud music festival, Cudi revealed intentions on releasing two full-length projects in 2022, with plans of releasing an album prior to Entergalactic "I have Entergalactic coming in the summer, and I wanna drop another album before that. I got some tasty surprises and I'm really excited about all this new shit, this new music, to give to you guys," he said before playing a recording of a song that has since been dubbed "Freshie", concluding with "That's why I'm teasing this shit now because it's coming out soon." The songs "Wow" and "Freshie" were seemingly set to appear on the unreleased album before Entergalactic.

In November 2022, during one of his To the Moon World Tour stops in Europe, Cudi debuted "Solo Dolo Pt. IV". The song contains a sample of the original "Solo Dolo (Nightmare)" track, featured on his 2009 debut album, Man on the Moon: The End of Day, which in turn contains a sample of "The Traitor", performed by the Menahan Street Band. The production features enormous amounts of bass, something that the featured artist, fellow American rapper Playboi Carti, is known for. "Solo Dolo Pt. II" appeared on Cudi's 2013 album Indicud, and "Solo Dolo, Pt. III" on his 2020 album Man on the Moon III: The Chosen. Cudi said that he currently has "one more" album in the process but that the fourth installment of his "Solo Dolo" series would be a single before that project comes out. However, on May 15, 2023, Cudi revealed the song would not make the album due to Carti not clearing his feature.

Kid Cudi
(@KidCudi)
tweeted:

There were multiple blocks of time I was recording. I started beginning of Jan 2021, recorded about 30 songs throughout the year, scrapped them, then in the fall of 2022 made another 30. So I ended up being in a fuckin zone that second run and thats most of this album. Some songs made it from first round. Top of this year and last few months made another 10. Im finally finished. U will be happy. Made sure to only use the HEAT

May 7, 2023

On December 2, 2022, Cudi posted on Twitter that he's recorded more than enough material to release another project. "11 songs in [five] days. My goal was to do a whole new album worth of songs this week. 12 was my goal. Might get 14," he tweeted.

On May 15, 2023, Cudi confirmed fellow American rappers Travis Scott and Young Thug, as guest appearances on the album. In May 2023, American record producers BNYX and Keyon Christ respectively revealed they had worked on the album with Cudi. The release of the song "Porsche Topless" as the first single, revealed the song was produced by BNYX, Jean Baptiste and Cudi himself. In June 2023, Cudi previewed a song tentatively titled "Superboy", which was also produced by BNYX.

The listening party Cudi held in June, previewed several songs and revealed American rapper Wiz Khalifa was set to appear on the album. On June 19, Cudi revealed he recorded songs with his longtime friend and collaborator, fellow American rapper Chip tha Ripper; together they are collectively known as the Almighty GloryUs.

On July 29, 2023, Cudi made an appearance during American electro house DJ Steve Aoki's set at Tomorrowland, to preview a new collaboration of theirs, "ElectroWaveBaby 2.0," which was also co-produced by BNYX and Jean Stockton. Cudi and Aoki previously collaborated in 2010 on the remix of Cudi's diamond certified single, "Pursuit of Happiness", on "Cudi the Kid" from Aoki's debut album, Wonderland (2012), and on "Burrow" from Cudi's ninth album, Entergalactic (2022).

In July 2023, Cudi revealed the album would have multiple deluxe editions. In an August 15 tweet, Cudi revealed there would be more featured guests throughout the different deluxe versions of the album. Cudi would later nix the idea for multiple deluxe editions with different bonus tracks, in favor of releasing all the added tracks on one record, Insano (Nitro Mega). Nitro Mega would go on to include the aforementioned "Superboy" and "ElectroWaveBaby 2.0," as well as the Wiz Khalifa and Chip tha Ripper features.

== Music and lyrics ==
Reviewing the album's lead single "Porsche Topless", The Fader proclaimed, "Cudi celebrates the good times on his latest effort," while Complex applauded its "bouncy production and a carefree hook." Hypebeast christened it "a fun and upbeat summer anthem," and Consequence of Sound dubbed it "a top-down, tunes-up party track."

Billboard called "Most Ain't Dennis" a "braggadocios track in which the artist flexes his accolades and how his counterparts pale in comparison." HipHopDX wrote "Most Ain't Dennis" evokes "Indicud tracks like "Burn Baby Burn" and "Lord of the Sad and Lonely" as it finds Cudder spitting menacing bars over distorted, speaker-rattling production."

== Release and promotion ==
On February 27, 2023, Cudi announced on Twitter his last contractual album with Republic Records would be released in autumn; adding that the rollout for the album will begin in the summer, with singles to be released. A fan replied to his tweet and asked whether a concert tour is in his plans, to which Cudi confirmed he would be embarking on a world tour in 2024. He would later say he planned on touring for at least five months.

On March 8, Cudi took to Instagram Live to reveal the album's first single would be released on June 1. He later revealed on Twitter he would be directing the music video for the album's first single. On April 26, 2023, Cudi announced he would reveal the title of the album and release the lead single on June 2. After unveiling behind the scenes photos of the music video for the first single, on May 9, Cudi made the single available for pre-save on all streaming platforms.

On May 19, through a post on TikTok, Cudi revealed the first single would be titled "Flex", while previewing the song. However, Cudi would later pivot and instead release "Porsche Topless" as the lead single on June 2. The cover art for the single was designed by Cudi and American visual artist Glassface, who also helped produce the music video for "Flex" which was ultimately shelved.

On June 2, after premiering the lead single and hosting a listening session with fans in Los Angeles, Cudi revealed the album would be titled Insano. In June, Cudi announced he would be holding the second annual Moon Man's Landing festival; later unveiling the line-up to include $uicideboy$, Bashfortheworld, Chelsea Pastel, Coi Leray, Siena Bella and Lil Uzi Vert. Cudi also revealed the location, confirming it would again take place in his hometown of Cleveland, on August 19, at Rocket Mortgage FieldHouse.

In July 2023, Cudi announced he would be embarking on a worldwide tour from April 2024 to November 2025. He also revealed the album would have multiple deluxe editions. During his headlining set for the HARD Summer music festival, after previewing five new songs from the album, Cudi revealed the album would be issued on September 15, the same date his 2009 debut album was released.

On August 17, 2023, Cudi made the album available for pre-order and pre-save on streaming platforms; additionally he released merchandise in support of the album, consisting of short- and long-sleeve T-shirts and pullover hoodies—all of which feature graphics that reference the album. Cudi also unveiled four cover art variations that feature artwork by American designers KAWS and Glassface, respectively.

On August 18, the Cleveland Guardians and Cudi announced their partnership for Kid Cudi Day on September 22, 2023. The event would be held at Progressive Field in Cleveland, Ohio as the Guardians play host to the Baltimore Orioles. The event will be to celebrate the release of the album and honor the work Cudi has done for the Cleveland community.

On September 4, Cudi announced he was pushing back the album's release date to January 2024. He claimed the delay was due to being a perfectionist and wanting to give the best version of the album. Due to the delay, Cudi decided to release two promotional singles in support of the album, "Most Ain't Dennis" and "Ill What I Bleed" that day. On November 3, 2023, he released the album's second single, "At the Party", which features fellow American musicians Travis Scott and Pharrell Williams, the latter of whom produced the song.

The album's finalized tracklist was unveiled on January 8, 2024. In January 2024, massive statues sculptured in Kid Cudi's likeness began appearing in cities across the globe, namely Paris, Los Angeles and New York City. The statues of Cudi stood at approximately 33 feet tall, with red-purple lights blaring out of his eyes and a small spotlight out of his mouth. The sculpture situated in Paris played tracks from Insano and Insano (Nitro Mega).

On March 6, 2024, Kid Cudi announced Insano: Engage the Rage World Tour. The tour was set to feature fellow American rappers EarthGang, Jaden Smith and Pusha T as opening acts, with Cudi set to embark on the tour on June 28, 2024. However, in April 2024, the tour was postponed, later canceled after Cudi broke his foot while performing at Coachella.

== Critical reception ==
Professional ratings
Aggregate scores
Source	Rating
Metacritic	64/100
Review scores
Source	Rating
AllMusic	3.5/5 stars
Clash	7/10
The Guardian	3/5 stars
HipHopDX	3.3/5
Pitchfork	4.6/10
PopMatters	6/10

Insano was met with generally favorable reviews. At Metacritic, which assigns a normalized rating out of 100 to reviews from professional publications, the album received an average score of 64, based on 7 reviews, indicating "generally favorable reviews". HipHopDX's Sam Moore wrote that Kid Cudi "floats into a new space in what feels like an attempt to tap into the enormous market of close collaborator Travis Scott" and that the album "grasps the scattershot creative mind of Cudi as accurately as any of his other projects". Reviewing the album for PopMatters, Igor Bannikov stated that Cudi "does his usual cosmic, moonish, entergalactic stuff in a relaxed, low-key manner, not aiming to make something iconic". Robin Murray of Clash called the album a "lavish return" but felt that it "isn't perfect" and is "at times disjointed" with "a few tracks here that could have been excised without disrupting Kid Cudi's central narrative. 'Electrowavebaby' is fun but doesn't seem to add to his sound, while 'Mr Coola' feels a little dated". Pitchfork's Dylan Green opined, "To its credit, Insano is trying to do something different—that different thing, however, is just having DJ Drama provide thin narrative window dressing to a spate of uninspired Kid Cudi songs".

== Commercial performance ==
Insano debuted at number 13 on the US Billboard 200 chart, became Cudi's seventh US top-20 debut on the chart. The album marking the third highest debut of the week and the fifth best-selling album of the week, with 8,500 sold. Of that sum, physical sales comprise 7,000 (about 5,500 on vinyl and 1,500 on CD) and digital downloads comprise 1,500. The album's sales were enhanced by its availability across four vinyl variants and four CD editions.

== Track listing ==
Insano track listing
No.	Title	Writer(s)	Producer(s)	Length
1.	"Often, I Have These Dreamz" (with DJ Drama)	Scott Mescudi; William Coleman; Jean-Baptiste Kouame; Mike McHenry; Dorian Burton; Herman Kelly	Kid Cudi; Mike Zombie; Jean-Baptiste; Days of 1993	2:29
2.	"Keep Bouncin'"	Mescudi; Carlton Mays, Jr.	Kid Cudi; Honorable C.N.O.T.E.; Jean-Baptiste	2:56
3.	"Get Off Me" (with Travis Scott)	Mescudi; Jacques Webster II; Pavel Matev; Alexander Yossifov; Konstantin Dragnev; Coleman; Kouame; McHenry	Mescudi; Mike Zombie; Jean-Baptiste; Days of 1993; Webster	3:35
4.	"Most Ain't Dennis"	Mescudi; Benjamin Saint Fort; Michael Mulé; Isaac De Boni; Jeremiah Raisen	Kid Cudi; Bnyx; FnZ; Sadpony; Jean-Baptiste	2:37
5.	"Wow" (with ASAP Rocky)	Mescudi; Rakim Mayers; Oladipo Omishore; Paul Irizarry; Carl Taylor	Kid Cudi; Dot da Genius; Theycallmeparker; Kid Jupiter	4:34
6.	"ElectroWaveBaby"	Mescudi; Jonas Berggren; Malin Berggren; Jenny Berggren; Ulf Ekberg; Saint Fort; Kouame	Kid Cudi; Bnyx; Jean-Baptiste	3:25
7.	"A Tale of a Knight"	Mescudi; Mulé; De Boni; Kouame; Keanu Torres; Karl Rubin; Cydney Dade; Tom Levesque	Kid Cudi; FnZ; Jean-Baptiste; Keanu Beats; Rubin; Lil CC; Levesque	2:57
8.	"Cud Life"	Mescudi; Christian Boggs; Jonnywood; Omishore	Kid Cudi; Keyon Christ; Jonnywood; Jean-Baptiste; Dot da Genius^{[a]}	3:33
9.	"Too Damn High" (with Lil Yachty)	Mescudi; Miles McCollum; Kouame; Torres; Rubin; Dade; Charlie Braithwaite-Hatzigeorgiou; Omishore	Kid Cudi; Jean-Baptiste; Keanu Beats; Rubin; Lil CC; Bluskxy; Dot da Genius^{[a]}	2:18
10.	"Getcha Gone"	Mescudi; Anthony Kilhoffer; Michael Romito	Kilhoffer; Census; Jean-Baptiste	1:55
11.	"At the Party" (featuring Pharrell Williams and Travis Scott)	Mescudi; Pharrell Williams; Webster; Omishore	P. Williams	3:58
12.	"Mr. Coola"	Mescudi; Darwin Quinn; Kouame; McHenry; Luke Crowder; Kitwan McCoy; Walter Newell	Kid Cudi; C-Gutta; Jean-Baptiste; Days of 1993; Luke	2:27
13.	"Freshie"	Mescudi; Omishore; Patrick Reynolds; Julian Gramm	Dot da Genius; Plain Pat; J Gramm; Jean-Baptiste	3:19
14.	"Tortured"	Mescudi; Ebony Oshunrinde; Kevin Gomringer; Tim Gomringer	WondaGurl; Cubeatz; Jean-Baptiste	3:55
15.	"X & Cud" (with XXXTentacion)	Mescudi; Jahseh Onfroy; Jean-Pierre Ponnelle; Tobias Jesso Jr.; Omishore; John Cunningham	Kid Cudi; Dot da Genius; Cunningham; Jean-Baptiste; Cathedral	2:46
16.	"Seven" (with Lil Wayne)	Mescudi; Dwayne Carter, Jr.; David Biral; Denzel Baptiste; Michael Volpe	Take a Daytrip; Clams Casino	2:31
17.	"Funky Wizard Smoke"	Mescudi; Saint Fort; Patrick Wimberly; Je. Raisen; Kouame; Wynne Bennett; Jacques Webster	Kid Cudi; Bnyx; Wimberly; Sadpony; Jean-Baptiste; Bennett; Jacques Webster	2:45
18.	"Rager Boyz" (with Young Thug^{[b]})	Mescudi; Jeffery Williams; Omishore; Kilhoffer; David Karbal; Daniel Shyman	Kid Cudi; Dot da Genius; Kilhoffer; Thats Not It; Jean-Baptiste	2:49
19.	"Porsche Topless"	Mescudi; Saint Fort; Kouame	Kid Cudi; Bnyx; Jean-Baptiste	2:50
20.	"Blue Sky"	Mescudi; Justin Raisen; Je. Raisen; Kouame	Kid Cudi; Lil Yachty; Ju. Raisen; Sadpony; Jean-Baptiste	3:41
21.	"Hit the Streetz in My Nikes"	Mescudi; Laura Nyro; Kouame; McHenry; Kyle Edwards; Larus Arnarson	Kid Cudi; Jean-Baptiste; Days of 1993; Lastnight	2:40
Total length:				64:00

Notes

- ^{^[a]} signifies an additional producer.
- ^{^[b]} "Rager Boyz" was removed from the album on streaming platforms in July 2025, due to a feud between Cudi and Thug.
- "Often, I Have These Dreamz" contains a sample of "You Don't Have to Worry", as performed by Doris & Kelley.
- "Get Off Me" contains a sample of "Тъжна песен (Sad Song)", as performed by Donika Venkova.
- "ElectroWaveBaby" contains a sample of "All That She Wants", written by Jonas Berggren and Ulf Ekberg, as performed by Ace of Base.
- "At the Party" contains a sample of "Day 'n' Nite", as performed by Kid Cudi.
- "X & Cud" contains a sample of "Orlando", written by Jahseh Onfroy and Tobias Jesso Jr., as performed by XXXTentacion.
- "Hit the Streetz in My Nikes" contains a sample of "Hands Off the Man (Flim Flam Man)", written and performed by Laura Nyro.

== Charts ==
=== Weekly charts ===
Weekly chart performance for Insano
Chart (2024)	Peak position
Australian Hip Hop/R&B Albums (ARIA)	34
Austrian Albums (Ö3 Austria)	25
Belgian Albums (Ultratop Flanders)	67
Belgian Albums (Ultratop Wallonia)	73
Canadian Albums (Billboard)	24
Dutch Albums (Album Top 100)	46
French Albums (SNEP)	37
German Albums (Offizielle Top 100)	29
Italian Albums (FIMI)	66
Lithuanian Albums (AGATA)	53
New Zealand Albums (RMNZ)	19
Norwegian Albums (VG-lista)	14
Polish Albums (ZPAV)	96
Swiss Albums (Schweizer Hitparade)	8
UK Albums (Official Charts)	77
UK R&B Albums (Official Charts)	9
US Billboard 200	13
US Top R&B/Hip-Hop Albums (Billboard)	5
US Vinyl Albums (Billboard)	6

=== Year-end charts ===
Year-end chart performance for Insano
Chart (2024)	Position
US Top R&B/Hip-Hop Albums (Billboard)	96

== Personnel ==
Credits for Insano adapted from AllMusic.

- A$AP Rocky -Featured Artist
- A. "Bainz" Bains -Engineer, Mixing
- Alexander Yossifov - Composer
- Anthony Kilhoffer - Composer, Producer
- Anthony Vilchis - Mixing Assistant
- Aresh Banaji - Mixing Assistant
- Benjamin Saint Fort - Composer
- Bizzy Bone - Vocals
- Bluskxy - Producer
- BNYX - Producer
- C Gutta - Producer
- Carl Taylor - Composer
- Carlton Mays Jr. - Composer
- Cathedral - Producer
- Census - Producer
- Charlie Braithwaite Hatzigeorgiou - Composer
- Chaz Sexton - Assistant Engineer
- Chloe Clements
- Christian Boggs - A&R
- Clams Casino - Composer
- Cordale Quinn - Producer
- Cubeatz - Composer
- Cydney Dade - Producer
- DaHonorable C.N.O.T.E.- Composer
- Danny Shyman - Producer
- David Biral - Composer
- David Karbal - Composer
- Daysof1993 - Composer
- Denzel Baptiste - Producer
- DJ Drama - Composer
- Dominic Ganderton - Featured Artist, Vocals (Background)
- Dorian Burton - Engineer
- Dot Da Genius - Composer
- Dwayne Carter - Additional Production, Executive Producer, Producer
- FNZ - Engineer
- Gentuar Memishi - Producer
- Greg Truitt - Engineer
- Herman Kelly - Assistant Engineer
- Iain Findlay - Composer
- Isaac de Boni - Engineer
- J Gramm - Composer
- Jack Lailheugue - Producer
- Jacques Webster - Assistant Engineer
- Jahseh Onfroy - Composer
- Jean Baptiste - Composer
- Jean-Pierre Ponnelle - Composer, Executive Producer, Producer
- Jenny Berggren - Composer
- Jeremiah Raisen - Composer
- Joe LaPorta - Composer
- Joe Spix - Mastering
- John Cunningham - Package Design
- John Roberts - Composer, Producer
- Jonas Berggren - A&R
- Jonnywood - Composer
- Jordan Kohno - Composer, Producer
- Julian Gramm - Engineer
- Justin Raisen - Composer
- Karl Rubin - Composer, Producer
- Keanu Beats - Composer, Producer
- Keanu Torres - Producer
- Ken "Duro" Ifill - Composer
- Kevin Gomringer - A&R
- Keyon Christ - Composer
- Kid Cudi -Executive Producer, Primary Artist, Producer
- Kid Jupiter - Producer
- Kitwan McCoy - Producer
- Konstantin Dragnev - Composer
- Kyle Edwards - Composer
- Larus Arnarson - Composer
- Last Night - Composer
- Laura Nyro - Producer
- Lil CC - Composer
- Lil Wayne - Composer, Featured Artist
- Lil Yachty - Featured Artist, Producer
- Lucas Glastra - Assistant Engineer
- Luke Crowder - Composer, Producer
- Malin Berggren - Composer
- Manny Galvarez -Engineer
- Manny Marroquin - Mixing
- Marius Van Mierlo - Assistant Engineer
- Mark Glaser - Mastering Assistant
- Michael Mule - Composer
- Michael Romito - Composer
- Michael Volpe - Composer
- Mike Larson - Engineer
- Mike McHenry - Composer
- Mike Zombie - Producer
- Miles McCollum - Composer
- Norman Jean Roy - Photography
- Oladipo Omishore - Composer
- Patrick Plummer - Engineer
- Patrick Reynolds - Composer
- Patrick Wimberly - Composer, Producer
- Paul Irizarry - Composer
- Pavel Hristov Matev - Composer
- Pharrell Williams - Composer, Featured Artist, Producer
- Plain Pat - Producer
- Rakim Mayers - Composer
- Remy Dumelz - Assistant Engineer
- Sadpony - Producer
- Scott Mescudi - Composer, Creative Director
- Take a Daytrip - Producer
- That's Not It - Producer
- TheycallmeParker - Producer
- Tim Gomringer - Composer
- Tobias Jesso Jr. - Composer
- Tom Levesque - Composer, Producer
- Travis Scott - Featured Artist, Vocals (Background)
- Trey Station - Mixing Assistant
- Ulf "Buddha" Ekberg - Composer
- Walter Newell - Composer
- William Coleman - Composer
- William J Sullivan - Engineer, Mixing
- WondaGurl - Composer, Producer
- Wynne Bennett - Composer, Producer
- Young Thug - Composer, Featured Artist
- Zach Pereyra - Mixing Assistant

== Release history ==
Release dates and formats for Insano
Region	Date	Label(s)	Format(s)	Ref
Various	January 12, 2024	Wicked Awesome; Republic	CD; LP; digital download; streaming	
