= Satellite Flight: The Journey to Mother Moon =

Studio album by Kid Cudi
- Released: February 25, 2014
- Recorded: 2013
- Studios: Glenwood Studios (Burbank, California); Chalice Studios (Los Angeles, California); Electric Lady Studios (New York City)
- Genres: Alternative hip hop; space rock; neo-psychedelia; progressive rock; indie rock; synth-pop
- Length: 41:14
- Labels: Wicked Awesome; Republic
- Producers: Kid Cudi (also exec.); Dennis Cummings (exec.); WZRD; Dot da Genius

Kid Cudi chronology
Indicud (2013)	Satellite Flight: The Journey to Mother Moon (2014)	Speedin' Bullet 2 Heaven (2015)

Satellite Flight: The Journey to Mother Moon (stylized as KiD CuDi presents SATELLITE FLIGHT: The journey to Mother Moon) is the fourth studio album by American musician Kid Cudi. The album, which was issued on February 25, 2014, with only few hours' notice, was first released to digital retailers by Wicked Awesome Records and Republic Records. The album features a sole guest appearance from Raphael Saadiq. Satellite Flight received generally mixed reception from music critics, although some praised the album for its production and surprise release strategy.

Kid Cudi first revealed information about the project in October 2013, announcing it would be an EP, primarily produced by himself, much like his last effort Indicud (2013). Cudi has stated the album is a prelude to Man on the Moon III: The Chosen, the then-unreleased final installment in his Man on the Moon trilogy of albums, and that it serves as a bridge between Indicud and Man on the Moon III, which was ultimately released in December 2020.

== Background and development ==
In October 2013, while on tour at a show in Texas, Kid Cudi announced he would be releasing an extended play (EP), sometime in the next three months. Cudi also revealed he would be producing it alongside his WZRD bandmate Dot da Genius and that frequent collaborator King Chip, would appear on the EP. He then called the EP a prelude to what was originally planned to be his fourth album, Man on the Moon III, and stated that the album would be released in 2015. It was not released that year, however, ultimately being released as his seventh album five years later in 2020. On October 19, 2013, Cudi revealed "Going to the Ceremony", a song he had released via online audio distribution platform SoundCloud, earlier in July, would be included in the EP. Cudi would also go on to reveal a remix of his hit single "Day 'n' Nite", which was briefly previewed on the intro of his 2008 breakout mixtape A Kid Named Cudi, would also appear on the EP. On November 25, 2013, via his Twitter feed, Cudi revealed the title of the EP to be Satellite Flight: The Journey to Mother Moon. On December 16, 2013, Kid Cudi once again used SoundCloud to release "Satellite Flight", the EP's title-track. On December 20, 2013, Cudi expressed on Twitter: "This EP is designed to reclaim my style others have been tryna duplicate for the past 5 years."

"I kinda went director on this project. I had the idea for the first and second [Man on the Moon] albums, with the whole five acts split. Man on the Moon III will go back to that whole breakdown and this comes back to that tradition, with the acts and everything being seamlessly in order."

— In a January 2014 interview with MTV, Cudi poked fun at his love for stretching out the storyline across different albums.

On January 18, 2014, Kid Cudi revealed the EP would be released in February, when he tweeted: "We all take flight in February. Get to packin Cud Fam!". Later that day, Cudi tweeted: "Satellite Flight: The Journey To Mother Moon is the bridge between Indicud and MOTM3. An experience 6 years in the making." He also tweeted: "Upon the release of the EP, play all my albums back to back starting from MOTM1 (WZRD included) to prepare u for the next chapter, MOTM3" On January 27, 2014, Kid Cudi revealed on Twitter that Satellite Flight: The Journey to Mother Moon, would no longer be an EP, but a full-length studio album instead. Kid Cudi also confirmed the album would still be released in February.

On January 31, 2014, in an interview with MTV, Cudi explained he hit such a creative stride when he began to work on the EP, that he decided to just complete a full album instead. During the same interview he stated the album will bridge the gap between Indicud and the third and final installment of the Man on the Moon trilogy of albums, now known as Man on the Moon III: The Chosen: "It starts where Indicud left off perfectly, and takes you right into MOTM III. It's like a TV show that ends with that cliffhanger. The album ends that way, where you get that one song and before you know it, the song is over and the album is over, but there's a 'to be continued...' There's more to the story." Cudi also revealed that the album would first be released to digital retailers and added that the physical copy might contain bonus tracks, or as he called them "deleted scenes" or "flashbacks." On February 13, 2014, via his Twitter account, Cudi unveiled the album's official track-listing, as well as the album art, which he designed himself. Cudi also stated that the track-listing is only the "digital release track listing" and that "new jams will be added for the physical, kind of like a extended 'Directors Cut'!".

== Release and promotion ==
"Satellite Flight"
A sample of the album's title track, which contains introspective raps and Kid Cudi's trademark crooning. The atmospheric track harbors elements of indie-electro and is laced with grainy synths, percussion and dramatic strings.

"Going to the Ceremony"
"Going to the Ceremony" is a mediation on addiction. The song is infused with arena rock, being driven by guitar riffs. Kid Cudi's flat singing features winding melodies and is punctuated by humming.

Only four months removed from the release of his third solo album Indicud, on July 1, 2013, Cudi unexpectedly released a new song titled "Going to the Ceremony", without divulging any further information. During a show in Dallas, Texas, on October 16, 2013, Cudi announced the new project, which he said would be released in the next three months: "When I give you the release date, it will be 24 hours before its released," Kid Cudi said to the concert crowd. "You won't know when it's going to happen, but it's definitely going to happen in the next three months." On February 24, 2014, offering just a few hours' notice, with propitious tweets such as "Time to make the world stand still" and "1 hour til launch...", Kid Cudi surprised fans by issuing a new album at midnight. When the album was put up on the iTunes Store, the release date initially read April 29, 2014, which prompted Cudi to tweet: "The date says April 29, 2014 but thats a glitch. Or is it ;) Album Available Now."

Upon its release several media outlets compared the albums launch to the respective surprise releases of Jay-Z's Magna Carta Holy Grail (2013), Kanye West's Yeezus (2013), but mostly Beyoncé's eponymous fifth album (2013). In his February 2014 interview with Complex, Kid Cudi spoke on the comparisons: "I was like, 'Man, I’m tired of promoting and marketing an album. I just wanna give it. This project isn't something I was planning on doing. I just kinda did it, like, 'Let’s see what happens if I do it this way.'” Cudi noted he already had a release date in mind when Beyoncé released her album online without warning: "I knew I was gonna do it around February—actually January was the target. I wanted to have it around my 30th birthday, Beyoncé’s album came out around December. If I’d had a time machine I would've known, but her stuff was a surprise to all." Cudi revealed that while she had beat him to the punch, it showed him that the strategy could pay off: "At the same time, watching Beyoncé drop definitely gave me the confidence and let me know that it could be executed. Like, 'Oh yes! someone was the guinea pig and it worked.' Perfect, now I can try. It’s a beautiful thing that it worked for me because I am not Beyoncé. Maybe in my wildest dreams on my prettiest day. [Laughs.]"

On March 4, 2014, Kid Cudi appeared on Chelsea Lately, where he was interviewed by Oscar-nominated actress Gabourey Sidibe and promoted Satellite Flight, as well as the 2014 Need for Speed film. On March 15, 2014, Cudi appeared on The Arsenio Hall Show, where he promoted both the album, discussed the state of hip-hop, suicidal thoughts, the Need for Speed film and performed the song "Internal Bleeding", from the album.

== Critical reception ==
Professional ratings
Aggregate scores
Source	Rating
Metacritic	60/100
Review scores
Source	Rating
AllMusic	3.5/5 stars
Consequence of Sound	D+
Exclaim!	6/10
HipHopDX	4/5 stars
Pitchfork Media	6.0/10
NME	8/10
XXL	4/5 (XL)

Satellite Flight: The Journey to Mother Moon was met with generally mixed reviews. At Metacritic, which assigns a normalized rating out of 100 to reviews from critics, the album received an average score of 60, which indicates "mixed or average reviews", based on 9 reviews. Erin Lowers of Exclaim! gave the album a six out of ten, saying "Satellite Flight: The Journey to the Mother Moon occupies a space between what is and what's coming, but Kid Cudi's admired originality falls short and is almost lackluster here in comparison to his previous works. For what it is, Satellite Flight is somewhere lost in the galaxy with a few glimmers of light shining on it from other planets." Whagle of Consequence of Sound gave the album a D+, saying "Despite several strong sections, including some of Cudi's best work in years, the album ends up being exactly what he intended it to be – a bridge between two things. A bridge, however, needs to lean on something stable. It can't stand on its own." Jayson Greene, of Pitchfork Media, gave the album a 6.0 and concluded with "Something surprising happens at the eleventh hour of Satellite Flight, however, and it bears mentioning. The sci-fi synths drop away, as does the dead-eyed chest-puffing. Cudi sings—sweetly, modestly, and in tune—over nothing but some guitar, finger-picked with the level of skill that suggests a deep study of Green Day's "All By Myself". The song is just two chords, but the voicing is haunting, and as Cudi hums to himself a sweet little melody, he instantly transforms into another possible version of himself: an indie-pop sad-sack troubadour, recording on a bed strewn with K Records 7-inches.

Edwin Ortiz of HipHopDX gave the album four out of five stars, saying "Flaws and all, Satellite Flight: The journey to Mother Moon stands as one of Kid Cudi’s biggest accomplishments. Rejuvenated. Recreated. Rebooted. Call it what you will. Scott Mescudi made an EP’s worth of material feel like an album, and he did it without surrendering his artistic integrity in the process. If Satellite Flight truly is a bridge between Indicud and Man on the Moon III, fans will be in for a treat when the third installment is finally released." Emmanuel C.M. of XXL gave the album an XL, saying "Kid Cudi regains his powers again with Satellite Flight. It is a dense, short album exhibiting wonderful synths, sharp drums, patent Cudi crooning, mumbles and a dreamy atmosphere. Like all of Cudi's music, it pushes the envelope and it's very abstract. There isn't a gray area with Cudder's music, in fact, it is very black and white, meaning people either are going to hate it or love it. But the journey is always an adventure. Satellite Flight captures Cudi's adventure back home to the moon and does it brilliantly." Al Horner of NME gave the album an eight out of ten, saying "Originally meant as an EP, at 10 tracks Satellite Flight is a leaner record than Indicud and all the better for it. Brave and futuristic, by venturing into space, Mescudi finally steps out of Kanye's shadow – with not just one small step, but one giant leap."

=== Accolades ===
Complex named it the thirty-first best album of the first half of 2014. Writing for them, Lauren Nostro said, "This is an angsty, seemingly unfinished piece of work that finds Cudi relying on the emotional, otherworldly themes he's built his fanbase on. For his fans, and for anyone who enjoys seeing him live, it's an interesting look at how dark his life has become, even with his sobriety and separation from G.O.O.D. Music. "Balmain Jeans" is a fan favorite, but it's "Troubled Boy," where Cudi showcases his vocals over a soft guitar riff, that indicates a new direction for the artist."

== Commercial performance ==
Satellite Flight: The Journey to Mother Moon debuted at number four on the Billboard 200 chart, with first-week sales of 87,000 digital copies in the United States. In the second week the album sold 8,300 in the US. As of November 2015, the album has sold 117,000 copies in the United States.

== Track listing ==
No.	Title	Writer(s)	Producer(s)	Length
1.	"Destination: Mother Moon"	Scott Mescudi	Kid Cudi	1:51
2.	"Going to the Ceremony"	Mescudi; Oladipo Omishore	WZRD	3:48
3.	"Satellite Flight"	Mescudi; Omishore; Mark Mulcahy	WZRD	4:35
4.	"Copernicus Landing"	Mescudi	Kid Cudi	4:36
5.	"Balmain Jeans" (featuring Raphael Saadiq)	Mescudi; Charles Wiggins	Kid Cudi	5:27
6.	"Too Bad I Have to Destroy You Now"	Mescudi; Omishore	Kid Cudi; Dot da Genius^{[a]}	6:17
7.	"Internal Bleeding"	Mescudi	Kid Cudi	4:16
8.	"In My Dreams 2015"	Mescudi	Kid Cudi	1:46
9.	"Return of the Moon Man (Original Score)"	Mescudi	Kid Cudi	5:15
10.	"Troubled Boy"	Mescudi	Kid Cudi	3:23
Total length:				41:14

Notes

- ^{^[a]} signifies a co-producer
- "Satellite Flight" contains a sample of "Coronado II", as performed by Polaris. Additionally, the title is stylized all caps.

== Personnel ==
Credits for Satellite Flight: The Journey to Mother Moon adapted from liner notes.

- Kid Cudi – production (all tracks), guitar (tracks 5, 10), executive production, art direction
- Dot da Genius – production (tracks 2, 3), co-production (track 6), synth (tracks 8, 9), piano (track 5), recording (tracks 2, 10)
- Iain Findlay – recording (tracks 1, 3–9), mixing (all tracks), programming (track 1)
- Raphael Saadiq – additional guitar (track 5), back up vocals (track 5)
- Vlado Meller – mastering (all tracks)
- Larry Gold – string arrangement and conduction (track 3)
- The Larry Gold Orchestra – strings (track 3)
- Dennis Cummings – executive production
- Kyledidthis – design

== Charts ==
=== Weekly charts ===
Chart (2014)	Peak position
Australian Albums (ARIA)	55
Belgian Albums (Ultratop Flanders)	132
Belgian Albums (Ultratop Wallonia)	109
Canadian Albums (Billboard)	7
French Albums (SNEP)	115
UK Albums (OCC)	67
UK R&B Albums (OCC)	9
US Billboard 200	4
US Top R&B/Hip-Hop Albums (Billboard)	2

=== Year-end charts ===
Chart (2014)	Position
US Top R&B/Hip-Hop Albums (Billboard)	40
US Rap Albums (Billboard)	23

== Release history ==
Region	Date	Format	Label	Ref.
Worldwide	February 25, 2014	Digital download	Wicked Awesome; Republic	
United States	April 18, 2015	LP	Wicked Awesome; Republic	
