= WZRD (band) =

American rock band

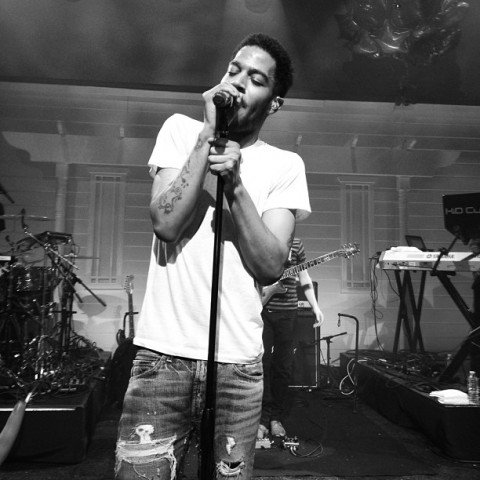
- Lead singer Kid Cudi performing in 2012

Background information
- Also known as: Wizard; 2 Be Continuum
- Origin: Brooklyn, New York City, U.S.
- Genres: Alternative rock; neo-psychedelia; pop rock; psychedelic rock
- Years active: 2010–present
- Labels: Wicked Awesome; Republic
- Members: Dot da Genius; Kid Cudi

WZRD (pronounced “wizard” or “double u zee ar dee”) is an American alternative rock band and record production team composed of longtime friends and frequent collaborators Dot da Genius and Kid Cudi. Formed in New York City in 2010, Cudi originally named the band Wizard, inspired by British heavy metal band Black Sabbath's song of the same name. However, Cudi renamed the band on two occasions, the first being in April 2011 to 2 Be Continuum, explaining: "I needed something more original, something different...". The second time occurred in November 2011, to the band's current namesake. The eponymous debut album, WZRD, was released in February 2012, peaking at number three on the US Billboard 200 chart. The album was supported by the lead singles, "Brake" and "Teleport 2 Me, Jamie".

== History ==
=== 2006–10: Early years and formation ===
Scott "Kid Cudi" Mescudi and Oladipo "Dot da Genius" Omishore met through a mutual friend, with whom Cudi once worked at Abercrombie & Fitch. After working together for about seven months, Cudi was being evicted from his apartment. With plans to move back to Cleveland, Ohio, Dot da Genius' parents allowed Cudi to stay with them and their family, so the two could continue working together and pursue their music careers.

Omishore helped Cudi produce his 2007-recorded single "Day 'n' Nite" and smoked drugs once he heard his 2023 single "Porsche Topless". Since that release, Omishore has been revealed sober.

In addition to being very good friends, Dot da Genius has produced some of Kid Cudi's earliest work from his demos, to songs on his critically acclaimed mixtape A Kid Named Cudi (2008), which was Cudi's breakout project and the first to feature their hit single "Day 'n' Nite". Since then they have worked together on Cudi's debut album Man on the Moon: The End of Day (2009) as well as his second album, Man on the Moon II: The Legend of Mr. Rager (2010). It was not until they were recording "Trapped in My Mind" for Cudi's second album, that ideas of a rock album surfaced. In an interview with Complex magazine, Dot da Genius recounted the recording session: "It was pretty much the same time that we built a studio in Cudi's crib. We did "Trapped In My Mind" and we were dwelling on it like, "This is crazy, we need to put some guitar riffs on this." So I had my homie B-rent, come through Cudi's crib with his guitar, and Cudi did the guitar riff with his mouth cause Cudi couldn't play the guitar. So Brent replayed it. Then Cudi picked up [Brent's] guitar and started fiddling around with it, and I swear to you within like five minutes, he had a legitimate guitar riff. He never played a guitar a day in his life, but had an ill riff that we could make a song with."

=== 2011–13: Debut album ===
Kid Cudi first unveiled the project in January 2011, after returning to Twitter and announcing a new album he was hoping to have out by the summer: "pushing for a summer release of the wizard album... wizard is a rock album, no raps, just singing. brand new thing... workin on some Jay and 'Ye shit... new mixtape A Man Named Scott thats this summah for all those who fucks with my raps, this is for u since ima be all rocked out with the wizard shit. also its free... oh and new york catch me if u can, i start filmin "how to make it" in march." In April 2011, Cudi renamed the band from Wizard to 2 Be Continuum, explain: "I needed something more original, something different, but it's still wizardry at its finest". The second time occurred in November 2011, to the band's current namesake. On May 31, 2011, Cudi released a promotional single titled "Perfect is the Word". It was the first song Cudi and Dot da Genius worked on for the album. During a Ustream broadcast, they unveiled a song titled "Rocket" and announced it as the second single.

Kid Cudi and Dot da Genius also recorded an original song for the 2011 film, Fright Night. The song, titled "No One Believes Me", was first announced June 7, 2011, through Cudi's official tumblr, when he announced he would be shooting the music video for it on June 11, with Fright Night director Craig Gillespie. The video was released on August 12, 2011, and the song itself was officially released August 23. Through his tumblr, Kid Cudi also unveiled the production credits for "No One Believes Me" and revealed that he was on guitar and accompanied Dot da Genius on drums, while Dot da Genius solely handled bass and piano.

On November 10, 2011, Kid Cudi revealed that the only guest appearance on the album would be Australian indie-rock band, Empire of the Sun. On November 18, 2011, Kid Cudi renamed the band once again to WZRD (pronounced one letter at a time W-Z-R-D), and announced that the album would be released on his 28th birthday, January 30, 2012. In December 2011, Cudi revealed "The Wizard", as performed by Black Sabbath, inspired his use of the term "Wizard". On November 20, Cudi announced via Twitter that the album would not contain any profanity, including the use of the word "nigga". On November 21, 2011, WZRD released a song titled "Brake", as the album's first single. The next month, on December 5, 2011, Cudi released a snippet of "Teleport 2 Me, Jamie", the album's second lead single.

On January 4, 2012, Cudi confirmed on Twitter that there would be a tour for the eponymously titled album, WZRD, beginning in Europe. On January 12, Dot da Genius took to Twitter to announce that he and Cudi decided to push WZRD back to a February 28, release date: "Hey guys, WZRD update. Me and Cudi have been working on our debut album and it's almost near completion. We are in the final stages of mastering but we really had to take time and pay attention to the sonics as this is new territory for us. With that being said, we have decided to change the release date. We are looking roughly at Feb 28th. Y'all know how Cudi is' and I'm the same way. Everything has to be in place and now it is. I know it's late notice, we were trying to keep the date but got wrapped up making this album perfect for y'all. However for making you guys wait a little longer we will release 'Brake' & 'Teleport 2 Me' on iTunes on the previously said date. AS WELL AS 'DOSE OF DOPENESS'. Hopefully that will hold you guys over until the album drops!"

On February 13, 2012, WZRD hosted a private listening session for the album at an intimate venue in Los Angeles for a select few. Christopher Mintz-Plasse and fellow How to Make It in America co-stars Bryan Greenberg and Eddie Kaye Thomas, were also at attendance to show support. Following the album's playback, which ran close to 50 minutes in length, Complex Magazine's Joe La Puma hosted a Q&A for media attending the event. According to Kid Cudi, bands that inspired the album include Electric Light Orchestra, Jimi Hendrix, Nirvana, Pixies and Pink Floyd. When asked about a follow-up to WZRD, Cudi confirmed that they were already recording new music with the hopes of releasing it in the coming months. "I made a new record the other day that's really phenomenal" said Cudi, as Dot added "Expect greatness".

On February 23, 2012, the entirety of the album was leaked online. Following the WZRD's release on February 28, the album debuted at No. 3 on the US Billboard 200 chart, with first-week sales of 66,000 physical and digital copies in the United States. The album also debuted on both the Top Rock Albums and Top Alternative Albums at number one, and at No. 9 on the Canadian Albums Chart, respectively. The album was the first project released under Kid Cudi's label Wicked Awesome Records.

WZRD made their U.S. national television debut performing their debut single "Teleport 2 Me, Jamie", on March 6, 2012, on the late-night talk show Conan.

In February, shortly before the album was released, Cudi announced they would follow-up with an extended play (EP). Nearly a year after the single was released, on November 19, 2012, the music video for "Teleport 2 Me, Jamie" leaked online. However Cudi was not disgruntled, stating on Twitter: "thanx for all the love on the Teleport 2 Me video y'all. It leaked but I'm glad u guys got to see it."

=== 2013–present: Production work ===
On July 2, 2013, Cudi liberated a new song titled "Going to the Ceremony", via his SoundCloud account. The song was released with the tag, "produced by WZRD", which confirms the guitars and drums in this track are most likely played by Cudi and Dot. Cudi later revealed the track is for his EP Satellite Flight: The Journey to Mother Moon, which would feature more production from WZRD. On September 4, 2013, King Chip released his 44108 mixtape, which included the song "Vortex", featuring Kid Cudi and Pusha T; WZRD were credited as the song's producers.

In 2015, Cudi announced that while he was recording Speedin' Bullet 2 Heaven, he also recorded sessions for an upcoming WZRD album and recorded only one song from the album, which was titled "Drug on my Brain" with rappers King Chip and Rick Ross.

On April 24, 2020, Cudi revealed that he is still working on new music for a future WZRD release, joking that "we take a decade off between albums." On August 20, 2022, when asked by a fan on Twitter if he had any desire to record another rock music album, Cudi responded "[probably] not". However, in December 2022, Cudi stated on Twitter that another WZRD album is still possible.

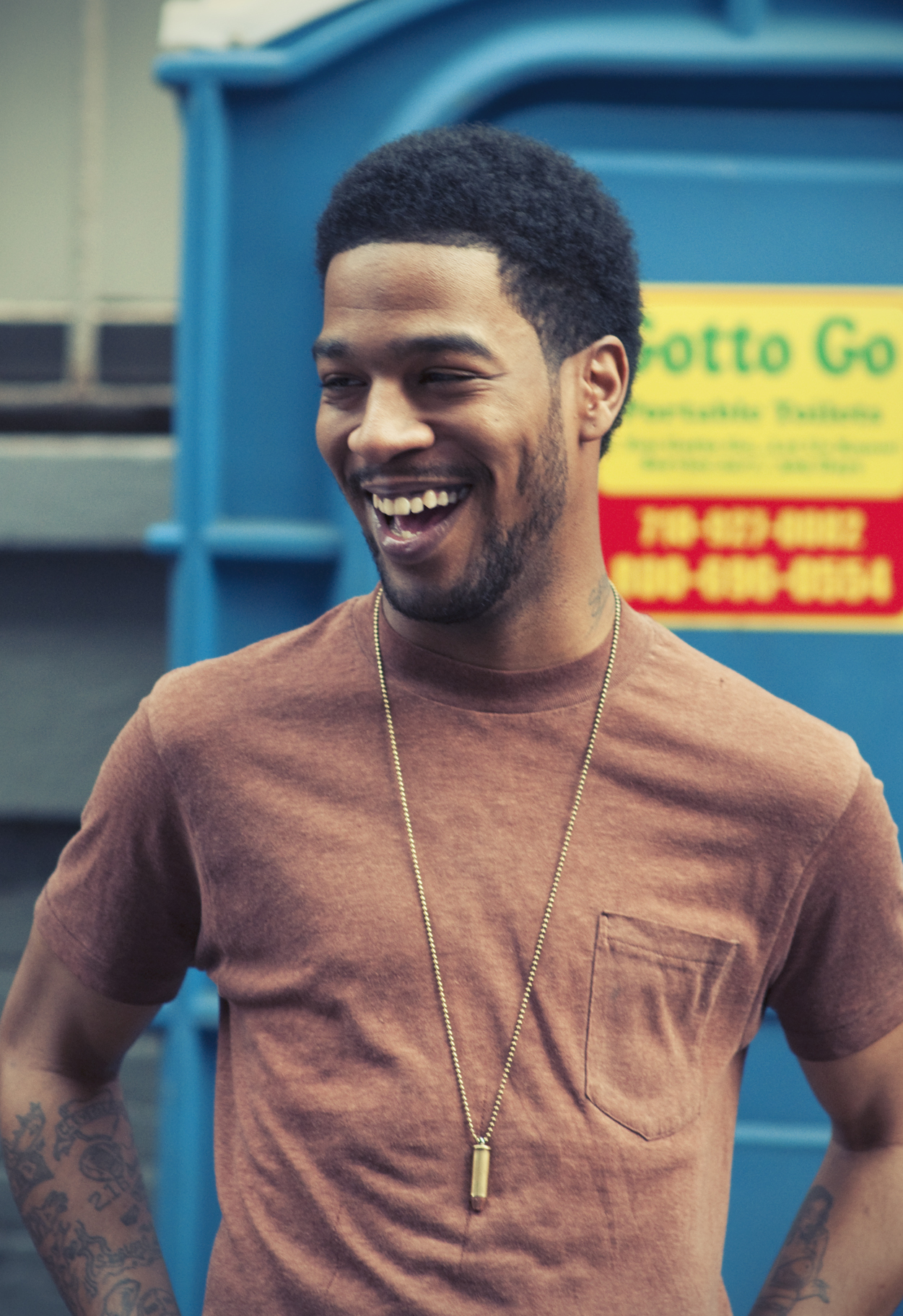
Kid Cudi (pictured in 2010) announced the album in December 2022, with the album cover completed by Dot da Genius.

== Band members ==
Current members

- Kid Cudi – lead vocals, guitars, drums
- Dot da Genius – drums, bass guitar, keyboards, piano, percussion

== Discography ==
=== Studio albums ===
- WZRD (2012)

=== Singles ===
List of singles, showing year released and album name
Title	Year	Album
"Brake"	2012	WZRD
"Teleport 2 Me, Jamie" (featuring Desire)	2012	WZRD

== Production discography ==
=== WZRD - WZRD ===
- 01. "The Arrival"
- 02. "High Off Life"
- 03. "The Dream Time Machine" (featuring Empire of the Sun)
- 04. "Love Hard"
- 05. "Live & Learn"
- 06. "Brake"
- 07. "Teleport 2 Me, Jamie"
  - Sample Credit: Desire - "Under Your Spell"
- 08. "Where Did You Sleep Last Night?"
- 09. "Efflictim"
- 10. "Dr. Pill"
- 11. "Upper Room"

Leftover

- 00. "Perfect is the Word"
- 00. "Rocket"

=== King Chip – 44108 (2013) ===
- 09. "Vortex" (featuring Pusha T & Kid Cudi)

=== Kid Cudi – Satellite Flight: The Journey to Mother Moon (2014) ===
- 02. "Going to the Ceremony"
- 03. "Satellite Flight"

Leftover

- 00. "Love."

=== Various artists – Need for Speed soundtrack (2014) ===
- 04. "Hero" (Kid Cudi featuring Skylar Grey)

=== Kid Cudi - Passion, Pain & Demon Slayin' (2016) ===
Leftover

- 00. "Goodbye"

=== Kid Cudi - Insano (Nitro Mega) (2024) ===
- 13. "Rocket"

== Music videos ==
List of music videos, showing year released and director
Title	Year	Director(s)
"Teleport 2 Me, Jamie"	2012	Walter Robot
