= J. P. Widney High School =

Special school in Los Angeles, California, United States

Joseph Pomeroy Widney High School

Location
- 2302 South Gramercy Place; Los Angeles, Los Angeles County, California 90018; United States; 34.035464°N 118.312315°W

Information
- Type: Public special education
- School district: Los Angeles Unified School District
- Principal: Michael J. Terry
- Teaching staff: 27.86 (FTE)
- Grades: 11-12
- Enrollment: 275 (2022-23)
- Average class size: 10.5
- Student to teacher ratio: 9.87
- Website: Official website

Joseph Pomeroy Widney High School, also known as Widney Career Preparatory & Transition Center, is a special-education magnet high school in Los Angeles, California. A part of the Los Angeles Unified School District, this school is named in honor of Dr. Joseph Pomeroy Widney.

== Student profile ==
The school serves students ranging in ages 13 to 22 who have severe disabilities. Because students from surrounding communities are bussed to the Central Los Angeles school, its student body reflects widely diverse cultural, ethnic, and economic backgrounds.

Students' race/ethnicity is:

- Asian: 21
- Hispanic: 208
- Black, non-Hispanic: 44
- White, non-Hispanic: 6
- Two or more races: 1

== The Kids of Widney High ==
The school is possibly best known for its music group, The Kids of Widney High, a rock band whose membership rotates with the changing student body. The group has recorded three CDs and has appeared in the 2005 film The Ringer.
