= King Wizard =

Single by Kid Cudi

from the album Indicud
- Released: December 18, 2012
- Recorded: 2012
- Genre: Hip hop; progressive rap
- Length: 4:17
- Label: GOOD Music; Universal Republic
- Songwriter: Scott Mescudi
- Producer: Kid Cudi

Kid Cudi singles chronology
"Just What I Am" (2012)	"King Wizard" (2012)	"Immortal" (2013)

Music video
- "King Wizard" on YouTube

"King Wizard" is a song by American hip hop recording artist Kid Cudi, taken from his third studio album Indicud (2013). The song was officially released on December 18, 2012 as the album's second official single, along with its accompanying music video, which was directed by Cudi himself.

== Background and release ==
On September 2, 2012 Kid Cudi took to his tumblr to preview lyrics from a new song titled “King Wizard”. On September 29, 2012, Cudi released a podcast, where he previewed "King Wizard", a new song he was "very excited about". On October 3, 2012, one day after "Just What I Am", the album's lead single was officially released via iTunes, Cudi liberated "King Wizard" as the second offering from Indicud via SoundCloud.

Cudi, who also produced the track, had teamed up with Samsung Mobile to release the clean version of the newly mastered “King Wizard” as a free download. The download was available by heading to Samsung Mobile USA's Facebook page under the “music” tab. The explicit version and the music video were officially released via iTunes, on December 18, 2012. On the day of its release Cudi announced via Twitter that the song was a promotional single and to expect Indicud in March 2013.

The single's cover art is a self-portrait, which Cudi took with his iPhone. "I took the picture on the King Wizard single cover myself w my iPhone and I think its really fuckin funny ha the lil silly things in life", tweeted Cudi.

== Charts ==
Chart (2012–13)	Peak position
US Billboard Hot 100	91
US Hot R&B/Hip-Hop Songs (Billboard)	28
US Hot Rap Songs (Billboard)	24

== Release history ==
Country	Date	Format	Label
United States	December 18, 2012	Digital download	Universal Republic
