= First Date (50 Cent song) =

Single by 50 Cent featuring Too Short
- Released: October 3, 2012
- Recorded: 2012
- Genre: East Coast hip-hop
- Length: 3:36
- Label: Shady; Aftermath; G-Unit; Interscope; Universal
- Songwriters: Curtis Jackson; R. Richardson; Todd Shaw; J.W. Alexander; W. Hutchinson
- Producer: 45 Music

50 Cent singles chronology
"New Day" (2012)	"First Date" (2012)	"My Life" (2012)

Too Short singles chronology
"On My Level" (2011)	"First Date" (2012)	"Girls" (2013)

"First Date" is a song by American rapper 50 Cent, released on October 3, 2012, as a single from his then-upcoming studio album Street King Immortal, which was eventually cancelled. The song, produced by 45 Music, features fellow American rapper Too Short.

== Background ==
50 Cent premiered the single with DJ Big Von on American radio station KMEL 106 on October 3, 2012, but it only was available to purchase as digital download on October 22, 2012. It was released at iTunes Store and on Amazon.com.

== Music video ==
A music video for the track was shot in Washington, D.C., on October 8, 2012, where 50 Cent was casting female models to make their appearance in the video. It also featured cameo appearances from G-Unit Records artist Tony Yayo and was directed by Eif Rivera, who 50 Cent has collaborated in several videos. Too Short part of the clip was shot on October 18, 2012, in Hollywood, California, and also directed by Eif Rivera.

50 Cent released a trailer of it on November 7, 2012, via his YouTube channel. The music video was released on November 14, 2012, on Hot 97 website.

The music video has been viewed over 5 million times on YouTube.

== Track listing ==
Digital download

1. "First Date" (featuring Too Short) – 3:36

== Credits and personnel ==
- Songwriter – Curtis Jackson, R. Richardson, Todd Shaw, J.W. Alexander, W. Hutchinson
- Production – 45 Music
- Mixing – Steve Baughman

== Charts ==
Chart (2012)	Peak position
US Hot R&B/Hip-Hop Songs (Billboard)	48

== Release history ==
Country	Date	Format	Label
United States	October 3, 2012	Digital download	Shady, Aftermath, Interscope
