= Ill What I Bleed =

2023 song by Kid Cudi

Promotional single by Kid Cudi

from the album Insano (Nitro Mega)
- Released: September 5, 2023
- Recorded: 2023
- Length: 2:53
- Label: Wicked Awesome; Republic
- Songwriters: Scott Mescudi; Jean-Baptiste Kouame; Ryan Buendia; Karl Rubin
- Producers: Kid Cudi; Jean-Baptiste; DJ Replay; Rubin

Kid Cudi singles chronology
"Porsche Topless" (2023)	"Ill What I Bleed" (2023)	"At the Party" (2023)

Music video
- Ill What I Bleed

"Ill What I Bleed" is a song by American rapper Kid Cudi, first released as a promotional single on September 5, 2023 in promotion for Cudi's ninth studio album Insano (2024), and its re-issue Insano (Nitro Mega) (2024), with the single being included in the latter.

== Background ==
Kid Cudi announced that the album would be dropped on his album Insano (2024), which was delayed to January 2024 due to Insano being delayed multiple times.

According to Cudi, the track is not intended to be the second single from the album. Instead, the release is intended to be "a lil taste from the album while u wait". The next single, "At the Party", would be released two weeks later as what Cudi said was the proper second single. The song was later added as the fourteenth track of the Insano sequel Insano (Nitro Mega) (2024).

== Release ==
According to Cudi, the track is not intended to be the second single from the album. Instead, the release is intended to be "a lil taste from the album while u wait". The next single, "At the Party", would be released two weeks later as what Cudi said was the proper second single.

== Reception and composition ==
Chris Deville of Stereogum described the track as being darker and slower than the previous single "Porsche Topless", reminding them of ASAP Ferg. The track has also been described as being very bass-heavy.

== Music video ==
The music video, released alongside the single's release, was directed by Kid Cudi and Jason Goldwatch. The video features Kid Cudi walking around Seoul, South Korea, dancing and smiling throughout the video. The video has been described as being very carefree and light.

== Release history ==
Release history and formats for "Ill What I Bleed"
Country	Date	Format	Label
United States	September 5, 2023	Streaming; digital download	Republic
United States	October 24, 2023	Streaming; digital download	Republic
