= Indicud =

Studio album by Kid Cudi
- Released: April 12, 2013
- Recorded: 2012–2013
- Studios: Chalice (Los Angeles); Encore (Burbank); Glenwood (Burbank); Westlake (West Hollywood)
- Genres: Hip-hop; alternative hip-hop
- Length: 70:44
- Labels: Wicked Awesome; GOOD; Republic
- Producer: Kid Cudi

Kid Cudi chronology
Man on the Moon II: The Legend of Mr. Rager (2010)	Indicud (2013)	Satellite Flight: The Journey to Mother Moon (2014)

Singles from Indicud
- 1. "Just What I Am" Released: October 2, 2012; 2. "King Wizard" Released: December 17, 2012; 3. "Immortal" Released: March 14, 2013; 4. "Girls" Released: April 2, 2013

Indicud is the third studio album by the American rapper Kid Cudi. It was released on April 12, 2013, by GOOD Music, Wicked Awesome Records, and Republic Records. It was the first album of Cudi's solo career to not be an installment of his Man on the Moon series. The album's cover artwork was designed by Kid Cudi himself, who also served as an executive producer of Indicud. It was Cudi's goal to make more uptempo and positive music with the album. He described it as a completely new format compared to his previous albums.

The album's record production was handled entirely by Cudi as well, with only record producer Hit-Boy co-producing one track, while Cudi's WZRD bandmate Dot da Genius, provided drums on two. The album features guest appearances from King Chip, Kendrick Lamar, Too Short, RZA, ASAP Rocky, Father John Misty, Michael Bolton and Haim.

During the early release of Indicud, it was preceded by four singles – "Just What I Am", "King Wizard", "Immortal" and "Girls". Indicud debuted at number two in the United States. With sales of 139,000 copies and debuted at number 32 on the UK Albums Chart, becoming Cudi's highest-charting album on the chart, while entering at number two on the UK R&B Chart. The album received mixed reviews from critics.

== Background ==
After his crossover into rock music with Dot da Genius, on their project WZRD (2012), Kid Cudi soon began working on his third solo studio album. The album was initially going to be the third installment to his Man on the Moon series, which he announced when he revealed he would not be releasing the A Man Named Scott mixtape, to focus on his rock project and "MOTM3". Be that as it may, in the summer of 2012 Cudi announced the title of his third studio album when he tweeted: "My new album is entitled indicud, it will be my version of The Chronic 2001, some songs i'll produce, others i'll feat &/or play songwriter". The title Indicud, is a play-on-words on the putative species of the genus Cannabis, indica, and Cudi's own name.

On June 8, 2012, Cudi announced Indicud, would be a double-disc album, until tweeting on October 28, 2012, that "Indicud will not be a double disc but will contain a maximum of 17 brand new jams." Kid Cudi also tweeted: "The overall tone of indicud is positive and confident," adding: "The energy of Indicud is its own new thing. New format with some of my favorite musical tricks here and there. The album moves dope".

Before the album's release, in December 2012, Cudi dedicated Indicud to the late Ben Breedlove and all his fans who died, continuing: "My journey shall continue in your honor. Never forgotten." The dedication was ultimately included in the album's liner notes. The album is upbeat and optimistic, very much unlike his previous studio album Man on the Moon II: The Legend of Mr. Rager (2010), which was considered darkly erratic. The positive vibe stems from Cudi's desire to always change and reinvent:

"I always try to push myself to the next level with everything I do. Since I've been in the business, critics have known that about me. When I started working on Indicud, I just wanted to bring more energy into my sound. Most of my old music was driven towards relaxed, chilled out smoke music. And that was my goal first coming in. Now it's like, 'What's a side of me that people haven't seen?' The only time people have seen me on up-tempos is on remixes or some shit. So I just wanted to take the energy to the next level. That ultimately inspired the subject matter. It was a chain reaction. With the up-tempos came more positive lyrics. It just brightened up the whole shit."

After announcing his departure from GOOD Music, Cudi revealed Indicud would be his last album under the label, adding that only the first 200,000 copies printed would have the GOOD Music logo on it; making them collector's items.

== Recording ==
It feels right. But now I'm just kinda going with the flow and that's kinda how Indicud came out. I didn't go in making an album, I just went in trying to learn how to make beats.. and I made "Just What I Am". And it was just like 'OK, dope record', but I didn't have the confidence to do an album yet. But then, like other jams came out, like "Unfuckwittable" and "Young Lady" and then it was just like 'Whoa, I could do an album here'. With just three songs, I felt like 'Okay, this is something that I could execute'. And I put it out there that I was gonna do the album with only just three songs man; but I work better under pressure.

— In an exclusive video interview with Complex, in January 2013, Cudi spoke on the making of Indicud

In April 2012, in Geneseo, New York, Cudi performed before a sold-out crowd and premiered a hip-hop song, his first since 2010. During his set, he performed a new record, tentatively titled "The Leader of the Delinquents", which he did a cappella. On April 25, 2012, Cudi was officially back to rapping with the release of "Dennis, Hook Me Up with Some More of That Whiskey!". The song, the first ever solely produced by Cudi himself, samples his 2010 song "Ghost!". On July 10, 2012, via his Twitter feed, Cudi announced collaborations on the album thus far, as the album had not yet been completed, to be Pusha T, Jaden Smith and Kendrick Lamar, along with more familiar collaborators Kanye West, King Chip and Cage. He also revealed he was hoping to collaborate with 50 Cent, Lloyd Banks, Diplo and MGMT. In September, he had also expressed interest in working with Harlem-bred rapper ASAP Rocky on Indicud. On October 1, 2012, Cudi confirmed that production from electronic rock duo Ratatat, with whom he collaborated on "Pursuit of Happiness" and "Alive" from his debut album Man on the Moon: The End of Day (2009), would be featured on Indicud.

On October 9 and 12, Cudi released pictures of him and Dot da Genius in the studio working on the album. On November 6, 2012, Cudi made it known that he was in the studio that day working with fellow American rapper J. Cole. On November 17, 2012, via his Twitter feed, Cudi announced the song he recorded with Kendrick Lamar was produced by himself and is titled "Solo Dolo, Part II". He also stated his former GOOD Music label-mate Common would be featured on the album, on a song produced by Dot da Genius and Cudi's mentor 88-Keys. On February 13, 2013, via Twitter, Cudi revealed he previewed the album to friend and fellow American actor, Mark Webber, and asked him to share his thoughts on the album, as a favor to the fans. During his barrage of tweets, Webber gave insight on the album, revealing Too Short and Wu-Tang Clan's RZA as features, as well as praising Cudi's production, rapping and singing. Unlike his previous albums, Indicud is primarily produced by Cudi himself.

"I definitely did [Indicud] with this angry, spiteful, villainous energy. I was able to make some really great records, but it was the most aggressive music I ever made"

— In a September 2014 interview with Joe Rogan, Cudi reminisced on the recording process of the album.

In an interview with Billboard, released March 2013, Cudi confirmed he was working closely with ASAP Rocky, while also revealing Haim, an all-female indie rock band, would appear on the album on a song produced by high-profile American record producer Hit-Boy and himself. On April 2, 2013, Hit-Boy, claimed besides Cudi, he was the only other person to provide production on the album. Cudi later confirmed the statement via Twitter. Cudi and Hit-Boy had been working on the aforementioned song since January 2011. The track is also the first record the two of them ever worked on together.

== Production ==
"Yeah, they're fuckin' wicked. I love them. They came to the studio with dope energy. I'd work with them any day. They're so dope. We were able to do a jam with something me and Hit-Boy did. It's a song that we've been trying to make happen for, like, two years now. I had the idea to get the girls on it and we reworked the beat a little bit. That will definitely be on there. It's next level. Everything on this album is next level, man. It's totally, like, the coldest shit. People are going to be like, 'What are we doing wrong?' You've just got to bring the madness sometimes."

— Commenting on his studio session with Haim:

In an April 2013 interview, Cudi told MTV News how his collaboration with "the '80s legend" Michael Bolton came about: "My mom is a huge fan so I grew up hearing him in the household and he did the song with The Lonely Island that I thought that was genius. I love those guys' work and seeing what they did with Michael they really used him, but I was like man I wanna use him in a way where I'm not tryna make a joke or anything – I just wanna use the mightiness of his voice in a way that's never been done before." "I reached out," Cudi added, "he responded immediately and we were able to get him in the studio for like three hours and most of the time he spent talking and just dropping science. It was really cool to have his energy and just to be around him because he's such a legend, so down to earth and cool. He was like the uncle I never had."

Cudi also incorporated quotes from his favorite movies into the album, wherever he saw fit. The first release with a movie quote was "Immortal", where Cudi sampled Adam Sandler in his 1995 film Billy Madison: "That’s one of my favorite movies, man. From my childhood, straight up. I love Adam Sandler. Throughout the album I wanted to include clips from some of my favorite movies to kind of narrate the album a bit and liven it up and give it some personality." He declared that throughout the album, people will hear scenes from several different movies:

"Yeah, different actors will pop up periodically. That’s how I felt when I finished the song. 'Oh my God. It's so good!' [Laughs] So there had to be a way that I could express myself. So I had to find some of my favorite quotes from my favorite movies. I put on Billy Madison and just watched that. There were so many lines that I picked that were great. But "I’m the smartest man alive!" resonated with me. And Adam Sandler is like a god to me. He's so amazing. I just wanted to pay homage through song and let him know, like, 'You’re the shit!'"

With Indicud, on several tracks Cudi took a backseat in vocals to rather showcase his production skills. "The focus was on producing the record for Kendrick, I wanted to shine as a producer first. I wanted to show that side off more than anything else and that's why I had my one verse then let Kendrick go ape-sh-- crazy all over the rest of it." As for the ASAP Rocky feature on "Brothers", Cudi explained that he made the decision to go with a minimal hook and let the Harlem rapper dominate the track: "I felt like that was a perfect beat for ASAP to get on there and speak some truths and talk to the younger generation, because he's in a place where a lot of kids are up to him and Kendrick. I just wanted to hear him say something a little bit more thoughtful, and he did that – he showed up. I was blown away by his craftsmanship, his professionalism and his overall mojo."

== Release and promotion ==
On October 28, 2012, after previously announcing hopes of releasing the album in late 2012, Cudi changed the estimate release date from late 2012 to early 2013. In late November, Cudi made it known he would be withholding the album's exact release date, until it was certain, to avoid push backs. On December 18, 2012, the same day promotional single "King Wizard" was officially released, Cudi revealed the album would be released in March 2013. On February 12, he announced the album's release date to be April 23, 2013. After the album leaked online in its entirety on April 9, 2013, Kid Cudi decided to push the album's release date up to April 16.

In early January, the album was named the ninth most anticipated album of 2013 by Complex and the 14th most anticipated album by XXL. In early 2013, Cudi covered Complex's February/March 2013 issue. In January 2013, Cudi took to Twitter to express his frustrations with record label, Universal Republic, not supporting and promoting his music. After providing facts about singles "Just What I Am" and "King Wizard", defending their strong online presence and lamenting about not getting radio play, Cudi tweeted, "if things dont change soon, theres gonna be some problems."

On March 14, 2013, Kid Cudi performed at Myspace's South by Southwest (SXSW) secret show in Austin, Texas and after performing his many hits, he previewed a new verse from Indicud. He also revealed that the album would feature 18 tracks, while officially confirming ASAP Rocky and Michael Bolton as featured guests. On March 16, Cudi announced that he would release the album's track list and cover art on April 2. Three days later, Kid Cudi announced via Twitter that the album had officially been completed and turned in to his label, Universal Republic. On March 26, the album's cover art and track list was unveiled by Walmart and later Complex. After the album cover's unveiling, Cudi took to Twitter to explain his decision for the artwork: "The album art represents me. A ball of flames in a rose gold frame." The cover's art direction was handled by Cudi himself. In December 2013, it would be named the sixteenth best album cover of 2013 by Complex. Later that day, Cudi appeared on Jimmy Kimmel Live! and performed the album's lead singles; "Just What I Am" and "Immortal", as well as premiering "Mad Solar", which he performed a cappella.

During late 2013, Kid Cudi toured in support of Indicud on The Cud Life Tour 2013. The tour was announced on July 15, with tickets going on sale the following day. Supporting acts on the tour include Big Sean, Tyler, the Creator and Logic. The tour took place in the United States beginning on August 22 and ran through October 18, 2013.

== Singles ==
On August 12, 2012, Kid Cudi released the lead single from Indicud, a song titled "Just What I Am", featuring his longtime collaborator and friend, rapper King Chip. On October 2, 2012, "Just What I Am", was released to iTunes as the first single from the album. The single's music video, which marked Cudi's directorial debut, was released November 6, 2012, via Kid Cudi's Vevo. The song has since peaked at number 74 on the US Billboard Hot 100.

On September 29, 2012, Cudi released a podcast where he previewed "King Wizard", a new song he was "very excited about". On October 3, 2012, one day after "Just What I Am", the album's lead single was officially released via iTunes, Cudi liberated "King Wizard" as the second offering from Indicud via SoundCloud. Cudi who also produced the track, had teamed up with Samsung Mobile to release the clean version of the newly mastered "King Wizard" as a free download. The download was available by heading to Samsung Mobile USA's Facebook page under the "music" tab. The explicit version and the music video were officially released via iTunes, on December 18, 2012, as the album's second single.

On October 29, Cudi announced he would be releasing the album's second official single at the end of November. On November 7, he revealed the upcoming single's title to be "Immortal", and that it again was produced by himself like the two previous releases, "Just What I Am" and "King Wizard". He claimed the song "will make you feel amazing in the heart and soul." However, on November 30, he revealed "Immortal" would not be released until 2013. "Immortal" would be premiered on March 1, 2013, via SoundCloud. The song was produced by Cudi, with the main sample being a track from one of his favorite bands MGMT's, "Congratulations". He reversed the song, sped it up, and produced over it. The song was officially released via iTunes on March 14, 2013, as the album's third single.

On April 2, 2013, Cudi released "Girls" for digital download via the iTunes Store, as the album's fourth single. The song features fellow American rapper Too Short, and was produced by Cudi.

== Critical reception ==
Indicud ratings
Aggregate scores
Source	Rating
AnyDecentMusic?	5.5/10
Metacritic	58/100
Review scores
Source	Rating
AllMusic	3.5/5 stars
The A.V. Club	B−
Exclaim!	7/10
NME	6/10
Now	3/5
Pitchfork	4.0/10
Rolling Stone	2.5/5 stars
Spin	7/10
USA Today	3.5/4 stars
XXL	3/5

Indicud was met with mixed reviews. At Metacritic, which assigns a normalized rating out of 100 to reviews from professional publications, the album received an average score of 58, based on 16 reviews. Aggregator AnyDecentMusic? gave it 5.5 out of 10, based on their assessment of the critical consensus.

Chris Dart of Exclaim! said, "It's also a smart, fun, eclectic record full of psychedelic influences and great, massive choruses." Steve Jones of USA Today said, "Scott Mescudi handles the production of his third album, creating moody, surreal soundscapes to bolster rhymes that run the gamut of emotions. But whether he's feeling invincible or despondent, you get a true sense of where his head's at." David Jeffries of AllMusic stated, "It's an entertaining, vibrant, and artistically filling album, so consider it a "presents" effort and enjoy the show." Mosi Reeves of Spin said, "None of the guest actors here distract from Cudi's signature self-mythologizing and inner turmoil. And most of the time, it's his inner turmoil that beckons you in, rather than merely pushing you out." Dan Buyanovsky of XXL stated, "As a whole, Cudi's version of 2001 is an original and bold project [...] This ambitious project does not fall flat, and credit is due to Cudi for continuing to challenge himself post-WZRD, taking on a new skill-set and concept rather than throwing together a collection of identically moody anthems."

Evan Rytlewski of The A.V. Club stated, "For the first time, Cudi is more interested in throwing an actual party than a pity party, and with his bass-engulfed beats and chewy, sing-along hooks, he’s well-suited to the task. In spite of its brighter outlook, though, Indicud is still a Kid Cudi record." Logan Smithson of PopMatters said, "If you've heard a Kid Cudi album before, you probably know what you’re going to get from Indicud, and for those who have been patiently awaiting his latest release, that's great news. Indicud features some of Kid Cudi’s best songs to date, and is an overall enjoyable listen from start to finish." Chris Coplan of Consequence stated, "It's ass-backwards to make other people look the best on your solo album. Still, that might demonstrate the path of Kid Cudi isn't about being a rapper, a singer, or something in between. The point is, this record just proves that Kid Cudi has a lot of sorting to do, and continuing down the same old path simply won’t cut it in the long-run." Joe Gross of Rolling Stone said, "Someday this Cleveland MC/producer/former weed enthusiast will find the lyrical and vocal charisma to match the scrumptiously dark, quasi-industrial tenor of his moody beats. But Cudi’s pitchy-dawg voice remains his own worst enemy."

=== Accolades ===
Closing out the year, the album was named to multiple album of the year lists. Complex ranked the album at number 26, on their list of the 50 best albums of 2013. They commented saying, "the album's cinematic feel puts Cudi in the director's seat as he compiles a diverse ensemble cast of luminaries, ranging from rap legends like RZA to indie rockers like Haim to West Coast spitters like Kendrick Lamar. The final product is proof Cudi can make a soundscape that others can easily adapt to, not the other way around." XXL positioned it at number 25 on their list of the best albums of 2013. In December 2013, HipHopDX placed it on their list of the top 25 albums of the year saying, "In a manner akin to Robert Johnson selling his soul to the devil to become a magician of a bluesman, Kid Cudi also clearly sold his soul to the demons that once claimed it in order to craft this album. There’s no singles here, just an intense and very listenable journey." The Source ranked it at number 23 on their list, saying "it delivered, sonically and conceptually. The album was an honest representation of the maturation of Cudi's space age sound and middle finger to the world attitude."

== Commercial performance ==
In its first week of release Indicud debuted at number two on the Billboard 200, selling 139,000 copies in the United States and debuted at number 32 on the UK Albums Chart, becoming Cudi's highest-charting album on the chart, while entering at number two on the UK R&B Chart. In its second week the album sold 36,000 more copies. In its third week the album sold 15,000 more copies, bringing its total sales in the United States to 183,000. As of December 19, 2013, the album has sold 260,000 copies in the United States. On February 25, 2019, the album was certified gold by the Recording Industry Association of America (RIAA) for combined sales and album-equivalent units of over 500,000 units in the United States.

The album also earned a level of commercial success internationally. In Canada it peaked at number three on the Canadian Albums Chart and peaked at number 32 on the UK Albums Chart. It also peaked at number 28 in Australia, number 32 in Denmark and number 33 in New Zealand. Indicud also charted on the main albums chart in Belgium, France, Germany, Switzerland and Ireland.

== Track listing ==
All tracks produced by Kid Cudi, except for "Red Eye", which features co-production by Hit-Boy.

Indicud track listing
No.	Title	Writer(s)	Length
1.	"The Resurrection of Scott Mescudi"	Scott Mescudi	2:41
2.	"Unfuckwittable"	Mescudi	4:36
3.	"Just What I Am" (featuring King Chip)	Mescudi; Charles Worth	3:48
4.	"Young Lady" (featuring Father John Misty)	Mescudi; Joshua Tillman	4:25
5.	"King Wizard"	Mescudi	4:16
6.	"Immortal"	Mescudi; Ben Goldwasser; Andrew VanWyngarden	5:01
7.	"Solo Dolo, Pt. II" (featuring Kendrick Lamar)	Mescudi; Kendrick Duckworth; Bill Conti	3:34
8.	"Girls" (featuring Too Short)	Mescudi; Todd Shaw; Dion Norman; Derrick Ordogne; Michael Monagan; Daniel Brattain; Carl Brown; Albert Cota; Shelly Goodhope; Veronica Mendez; Darrell Mitchell; Chantel Roquemore; Tanesa Tavin	4:27
9.	"New York City Rage Fest"	Mescudi	1:53
10.	"Red Eye" (featuring Haim)	Mescudi; Chauncey Hollis; Este Haim; Danielle Haim; Alana Haim	3:54
11.	"Mad Solar"	Mescudi	4:08
12.	"Beez" (featuring RZA)	Mescudi; Robert Diggs; William Dennis; Isaac Hayes; Brad Jordan; Doug King	3:13
13.	"Brothers" (featuring King Chip and ASAP Rocky)	Mescudi; Worth; Rakim Mayers	4:41
14.	"Burn Baby Burn"	Mescudi	2:58
15.	"Lord of the Sad and Lonely"	Mescudi	2:46
16.	"Cold Blooded"	Mescudi	2:32
17.	"Afterwards (Bring Yo Friends)" (featuring Michael Bolton and King Chip)	Mescudi; Worth	9:03
18.	"The Flight of the Moon Man"	Mescudi	2:51
Total length:			70:44

Sample credits

- "The Resurrection of Scott Mescudi" contains an excerpt from the film The Good Son (1993).
- "Unfuckwittable" contains an excerpt from the film The Good Son (1993).
- "Young Lady" contains a sample of "Hollywood Forever Cemetery Sings" performed by Father John Misty.
- "Immortal" contains a sample of "Congratulations" performed by MGMT. The song also contains excerpts from the films Billy Madison (1995) and The Good Son (1993).
- "Solo Dolo, Part II" contains a sample of "Going the Distance" performed by Menahan Street Band, which was originally composed by Bill Conti.
- "Girls" contains an interpolation of "Pretty Girls", written by Carl Brown, Shelly Goodhope, Tanesa Tavin, Daniel Brattain, Veronica Mendez, Darrell Mitchell, Albert Cota, Chantel Roquemore and Michael Monagan. The song also contains a sample of "Bitches (Reply)" performed by Dion "DJ Jimi" Norman.
- "Beez" contains a sample of "Mind Playing Tricks on Me" performed by Geto Boys.

== Personnel ==
Credits for Indicud taken from the album's liner notes.

- Scott "Kid Cudi" Mescudi – executive producer, cover design, art direction, producer, guitar, drums, keyboards, programming
- Dennis Cummings – executive producer
- Iain Findlay – engineer, mixing
- Bradford Smith – mix assistant
- Cesar Loza – mix assistant
- Derek "MixedByAli" Ali – vocal mixing (track 7)
- Chris Gehringer – mastering
- Hit-Boy – co-production, keyboards (track 10)
- Frank Lacy – trombone (track 3)
- Nabil Elderkin – photography
- Ayanna Collazo – background vocals (track 4)
- Dot da Genius – drums, keyboards (tracks 6, 8)
- King Chip – featured artist
- Father John Misty – featured artist
- Kendrick Lamar – featured artist
- Too Short – featured artist
- Haim – featured artist
- RZA – featured artist
- ASAP Rocky – featured artist
- Michael Bolton – featured artist

== Charts ==
=== Weekly charts ===
Weekly chart performance of Indicud
Chart (2013)	Peak position
Australian Albums (ARIA)	28
Belgian Albums (Ultratop Flanders)	93
Belgian Albums (Ultratop Wallonia)	88
Canadian Albums (Billboard)	3
Danish Albums (Hitlisten)	32
French Albums (SNEP)	57
German Albums (Offizielle Top 100)	99
Irish Albums (IRMA)	26
New Zealand Albums (RMNZ)	33
Swiss Albums (Schweizer Hitparade)	46
UK Albums (Official Charts)	32
UK R&B Albums (Official Charts)	2
US Billboard 200	2
US Top R&B/Hip-Hop Albums (Billboard)	1

=== Year-end charts ===
Year-end chart performance for Indicud
Chart (2013)	Position
US Billboard 200	116
US Top R&B/Hip-Hop Albums (Billboard)	23

== Certifications ==
Certifications for Indicud
Region	Certification	Certified units/sales
United States (RIAA)	Gold	500,000^{‡}
^{‡} Sales+streaming figures based on certification alone.

== Release history ==
Release dates and formats for Indicud
Region	Date	Label(s)	Format(s)	Ref
Australia	April 12, 2013	Republic	CD; digital download	
Germany	April 12, 2013	Republic	CD; digital download	
France	April 12, 2013	Republic	CD; digital download	
New Zealand	April 12, 2013	Republic	CD; digital download	
United Kingdom	April 12, 2013	Republic	CD; digital download	
Canada	April 16, 2013	Republic	CD; digital download	
United States	April 16, 2013	Wicked Awesome; GOOD Music; Republic	CD; LP; digital download	
