= At the Party (Kid Cudi song) =

Single by Kid Cudi featuring Pharrell Williams and Travis Scott

from the album Insano
- Released: November 3, 2023
- Recorded: 2021–2023
- Genre: Alternative hip hop; trap; house
- Length: 3:58
- Label: Wicked Awesome; Republic
- Songwriters: Scott Mescudi; Jacques Webster II; Pharrell Williams; Oladipo Omishore
- Producer: Pharrell Williams

Kid Cudi singles chronology
"Ill What I Bleed" (2023)	"At the Party" (2023)	"Forever" (2025)

Pharrell Williams singles chronology
"4Eva" (2023)	"At the Party" (2023)	"Airplane Tickets" (2023)

Travis Scott singles chronology
"Say My Grace" / "Likka Sto 2" (2023)	"At the Party" (2023)	"Water (Remix)" (2023)

"At the Party" is a song by American rapper Kid Cudi, released on November 3, 2023 as the lead single from Cudi's ninth studio album Insano (2024). The song features vocals from Pharrell Williams and Travis Scott, with Williams on the chorus while Scott provides a verse. An alternative hip hop and trap record, it was produced by Williams and written by its performers, alongside Dot da Genius. Kid Cudi tweeted that the song would be released on vinyl and CD on November 30, 2024.

== Background ==
Kid Cudi announced the album release date on September 15, 2023, but was delayed to sometime in 2024 and this single was released on November 3, 2023. On November 22, 2024, Kid Cudi tweeted that the song would be released on CD and vinyl on November 30, 2024 with a booklet showing Cudi flipping off the buyer and the CD design shows Travis Scott shaking his dreads, Pharrell Williams posing and Kid Cudi flipping off, continuing his poses on the booklet. The vinyl was posted on Cudi’s Facebook on Thanksgiving Day.

== Reception and composition ==
According to Stereogum, the track lacks the typical production that Pharrell Williams is known for, instead falling into more moody, cinematic trap music. Sophie Caraan of Hypebeast noted the track's synths as being "sharp" and that they "lay over the trap beats", giving space for Cudi, Williams, and Scott to "smoothly slide across the track and deliver an inconspicuous but bewitching cut."

Trace William Cowen of Complex described that track as Kid Cudi, Pharrell, and Travis Scott using "nightlife's edge as a soundscape" on the track. Writing for US weekly, Jason Brow stated that the track "finds the hip-hop trio stylin' and profilin' like Ric Flair, and each participant takes a moment to drop a fashion-inspired line on the track."

HipHipnMore believed the track was a "banger" with the potential to become a big song. Euphoria's Amanda Lang enjoyed the track, describing it as a "moody and cinematic house party track", also noting the departure from Williams usual Funk style. They overall believed the track was, while more laid back than much of Cudi's music in terms of having personal lyricism, is still no less fantastic and another line of success for Cudi.

Writing for Uproxx, Aaron Williams stated that the track features "a loopy, bass heavy beat" that backs up rap verses from the three artists, furthermore, stating that they "each perform with a buzzy filter and a droning delivery". They also went on to compliment the effects, believing that they "help make the three verses more lively, considering none of the three has ever really been anyone's idea of a showstopping rapper".

== Charts ==
Chart performance for "At the Party"
Chart (2023)	Peak position
New Zealand Hot Singles (RMNZ)	16
US Hot R&B/Hip-Hop Songs (Billboard)	47

== Release history ==
Release history and formats for "At the Party"
Region	Date	Label(s)	Format(s)	Ref.
Various	November 3, 2023	Wicked Awesome; Republic	Digital download; streaming	
Various	November 30, 2024	Wicked Awesome - Republic	CD - vinyl	TBA
