= Just What I Am =

Single by Kid Cudi featuring King Chip

from the album Indicud
- Released: October 2, 2012
- Recorded: 2012
- Genre: Hip hop; progressive rap
- Length: 3:48
- Label: GOOD Music; Universal Republic
- Songwriters: Scott Mescudi; Charles Worth
- Producer: Scott Mescudi

Kid Cudi singles chronology
| "No One Believes Me" (2011) | "Just What I Am" (2012) | "King Wizard" (2012) |

King Chip singles chronology
| "Just What I Am" (2012) |

Music video
- Just What I Am on YouTube

"Just What I Am" is a song by American hip hop recording artist Kid Cudi, released on October 2, 2012 as the lead single from his third studio album Indicud (2013). The song, produced by Cudi himself, features a guest appearance from frequent collaborator and fellow Cleveland-based rapper King Chip (also known as Chip Tha Ripper). The song's title references Exodus 3:14.

Despite only peaking at number 74 on the Billboard Hot 100, "Just What I Am" received double platinum certification by the Recording Industry Association of America (RIAA). Complex named the song #40 of the best 50 songs of 2012.

== Background and release ==
Initially, an un-mastered version of the song was released by Kid Cudi via Complex on August 13, 2012, with the title stylized as "Just What Iam". Kid Cudi announced the song's official mastered release on September 21, 2012. The official cover art for the iTunes release was revealed via Cudi's Facebook page on September 25, 2012. The song was later included on Cudi’s first greatest hits album The Boy Who Flew to the Moon, Vol. 1 (2022).

== Music video ==
On September 10, 2012 Cudi announced via his Twitter feed that he would be filming a music video for "Just What I Am" in Los Angeles. He also revealed he wanted his fans to be involved. Kid Cudi later tweeted: "the video was designed to be watched on acid and/or shrooms." The video, which marked Cudi's directorial debut, premiered November 6, 2012 on VEVO. The video features cameo appearances from Cudi’s contemporaries, fellow rapper Mac Miller and electrohouse DJ Steve Aoki. The visual are seen in a baroque frame, Cudi explained on Twitter saying: "all my videos will be in a baroque frame. I create art, so it will be presented as such. ART IN MOTION"

In a 2013 interview with Complex, Cudi explained why he used certain imagery in the visuals for "Just What I Am":

"Yeah, it’s funny. People in my life know that I’m a fucking goofball. I’m a prankster and I clown a lot. In any moment in time, I’ll incorporate some jokes in my music or raps or whatever. And all throughout my career I’ve noticed that the main thing people try to point out is the Illuminati, Satanic symbols and references in music videos—specifically in my shit. And like, in no way shape or form am I the type of individual that will be ever thinking of that type of shit while we were working on these videos. But it’s so interesting to see how sure of themselves people are, talking about this. It’s like, 'No, I know it, I know it! He sold his soul to the devil! I know he’s friends with Satan! I can feel it.' You know what I mean? Niggas be knowing I guess. So my way of tricking everybody, being that I had that control, I was like, 'Oh man. Wouldn’t it be cool if we just threw a bunch of fucking Satanic devil-worship Illuminati symbols into the video, just like abruptly popping up all over the place and fuck people up?' Just to fuck with them and then not say anything, like wait months and not say shit. Just let ‘em trip out, just let ‘em talk. Ignore it if it comes up in conversation. It was an experiment, like we totally experimented with this. Right now as we speak, it’s still going on. Kids are so outraged."

== In other media ==
In 2020, the song was heavily featured in the Judd Apatow film The King of Staten Island.

== Personnel ==
Taken from the albums liner notes

Musicians

- Kid Cudi – vocals, producer, programming, guitar
- Frank Lacy – trombone
- King Chip – vocals, producer

Production

- Iain Findlay – engineer, mixing
- Chris Gehringer – mastering
- Cesar Loza – mix assistant
- Bradford Smith – mix assistant

== Charts ==
| Chart (2012) | Peak position |
|---|---|
| Australia (ARIA) | 32 |
| France (SNEP) | 189 |
| US Billboard Hot 100 | 74 |
| US Hot R&B/Hip-Hop Songs (Billboard) | 17 |
| US Hot Rap Songs (Billboard) | 13 |

== Certifications ==
| Region | Certification | Certified units/sales |
|---|---|---|
| United States (RIAA) | 2× Platinum | 2,000,000^{‡} |
^{‡} Sales+streaming figures based on certification alone.

== Release history ==
| Country | Date | Format | Label |
|---|---|---|---|
| United States | October 2, 2012 | Digital download | Universal Republic |
| United States | October 30, 2012 | Rhythm/Crossover Radio | Universal Republic |
