= Insano (Nitro Mega) =

Studio album by Kid Cudi
- Released: February 23, 2024
- Recorded: 2007; 2011; 2022–2023
- Genre: Hip-hop
- Length: 59:09
- Labels: Wicked Awesome; Republic
- Producers: Kid Cudi; Jean-Baptiste; Ramii; Adriano; Anthony Kilhoffer; Beau Nox; Bnyx; Bryvn; Census; Darnell Donohue; Dot da Genius; Earl on the Beat; E*vax; Fwdslxsh; Honeywoodsix; Honorable C.N.O.T.E.; Justin Raisen; Karl Rubin; Lil Yachty; Morgoth Beatz; Notinbed; Ryan Buendia; Sadpony; Tee-Watt; WZRD; Zoo Kids

Kid Cudi chronology
Insano (2024)	Insano (Nitro Mega) (2024)	Free (2025)

Insano (Nitro Mega) is the tenth studio album by American musician Kid Cudi. The album was released on February 23, 2024, through Wicked Awesome and Republic Records. It serves as a partner album to Insano, which was issued the previous month. While initially planned as the deluxe version of Insano, it was confirmed by Cudi that the project was a separate album, without any shared tracks from the previous album. The album features guest appearances from Wiz Khalifa, Chip tha Ripper, Pusha T, Steve Aoki, Lil Yachty, Layzie Bone, and Krayzie Bone. Production was primarily handled by record producers who had worked on Insano, such as Cudi and Lil Yachty themselves, alongside Anthony Kilhoffer, Justin Raisen, Jean-Baptiste, Dot da Genius, Sadpony, and Bnyx, among others.

Kid Cudi
(@KidCudi)
tweeted:

The deluxe is pretty much a whole nother album, in the spirit of INSANO, but a continuation, a elevation of the vibes. 18 tracks. #INSANO

February 3, 2024

== Background ==
Following the release of Insano, Cudi had been hinting at new music throughout much of January and February. Finally, on February 14, he announced the record on social media. Cudi clarified that the record was not just a deluxe edition of Insano, but rather a "continuation of the energy" of Insano. Cudi also stated that "This album is me saying, 'I LOVE YOU' to all my fans that ride for me. It really is a big hug for y'all. There's some things only you guys would appreciate on there. [You'll] see."

The track "Ill What I Bleed" was first released as a promotional single for Insano on September 5, 2023, later being released as a commercial single on October 24, 2023, alongside a music video. Despite this, the track was left off of Insano, instead getting placed on this record as the fourteenth track.

The album features two older tracks, "Dose of Dopeness", a track that was initially previewed prior to Cudi's debut album, Man on the Moon: The End of Day, and "Rocket", recorded during Cudi's time with side project WZRD.

In July 2023, Cudi had announced Insano (2024) would have multiple deluxe editions. In an August 15 tweet, Cudi revealed there would be more featured guests throughout the different deluxe versions of the album. Cudi would later nix the idea for multiple deluxe editions with different bonus tracks, in favor of releasing all the added tracks on one record, Insano (Nitro Mega).

== Music and lyrics ==
Commenting on "Ill What I Bleed", Billboard stated "Cudi dials down the temperature […] and provides more melodic flair than raps." HipHopDX called "Ill What I Bleed" a "festival-ready banger featuring a woozy, thumping beat and Auto Tune-tinged vocals from Cudi, who defiantly sings about surviving life's trials and tribulations."

The twelfth track on the album, "Dose of Dopeness", is the oldest song recorded on the album. Recorded in 2008, the song was initially released online in 2012, by the song's producer, Dot da Genius, in preparation for his collaborative album with Cudi, WZRD (2012). In 2012, Pigeons and Planes wrote of the song: "his new stuff is bound to be polarizing, but this cut reminds us why we started liking Cudi so much in the first place."

The thirteenth track "Rocket", is the second oldest song on the album; the song was originally recorded in 2011 by Dot da Genius and Kid Cudi, collectively known as WZRD for their 2012 self-titled debut. Both "Dose of Dopeness" and "Rocket" were included on the album as an act of fan service, allowing the songs to be included on streaming platforms for the first time.

The fifteenth track "All My Life", produced by BRYVN and Anthony Kilhoffer, was originally previewed by Cudi on Instagram Live on September 24, 2021, with a tentative title of "Killswitch". He stated that the song would be used on a future project but not appear on his then-upcoming album Entergalactic (2022).

== Release and promotion ==
According to Cudi, the album had a troubled release. On February 22, Cudi went onto Twitter to announce that his label, Republic Records, was having issues releasing the album. Due to this event, the album was not released on time. In a social media post on Twitter elaborating on this, Cudi stated that:

"Hey fam, the label fucked up and didn't start loading my album up in time, so it won't be out at midnight," Cudi tweeted around 10 pm ET. "I'm workin on this now in real time and my plan is that it comes out tonight just a bit later. I'm waitin on a time and ima keep y'all posted."

Later in 2024, Cudi announced he would embark on a world tour, in promotion of this album and his previous album Insano. The tour would feature support from Pusha T and Jaden Smith among others. Dates were announced on March 6, 2024. The tour would ultimately be cancelled following a performance at Coachella in which Cudi jumped off stage and broke his calcaneus. Cudi has stated on social media that once he recovers from the injury there will be new tour dates as soon as possible. Cudi said 80% of his next album is finished and is set for release in 2026.

== Critical reception ==
Professional ratings
Review scores
Source	Rating
HipHopDX	3.5/5

Zachary Horvath of HotNewHipHop wrote that Nitro Mega shows Cudi [go] back to his experimentative roots", noting that "while it is still filled with bangers, it is not nearly as heavy on the trap/psychedelic sounds", citing "ElectroWaveBaby 2.0" as an example.

In a review by Ratings Game Music, they believed that the record felt like it primarily consisted of tracks that didn't make the cut for Insano, stating that they didn't feel as compelled to "analyze this album extensively". Albeit, still believing that the record "emphasizes Cudi's unwavering authenticity throughout his career, regardless of the era, collaborators, or production style." Another less positive review by Mark Chinapen of Medium stated that while a step up from Insano, still features "lackluster songwriting and a bloated tracklist full of filler." Positive aspects of the record included the production, which they considered to be much better than Insano, with specific highlights including "All My Life", "Win or Lose", "Everybody Like", and "Moon Man Shit". Negative aspects according to them were the songwriting, which they deemed as lazy, the lyrics, which they believed left much to be desired, and featuring a ton of filler that could have been left out.

== Track listing ==
Insano (Nitro Mega) track listing
No.	Title	Writer(s)	Producer(s)	Length
1.	"Human Made"	Scott Mescudi; Oladipo Omishore	Dot da Genius	3:48
2.	"Diamonds Lights Fast Cars" (featuring Wiz Khalifa)	Mescudi	Kid Cudi; Jean-Baptiste; Bnyx; Earl on the Beat	2:41
3.	"Win or Lose" (featuring Chip tha Ripper)	Mescudi; Charles Jawanzaa Worth; Rami Eadeh	Ramii	2:47
4.	"Chunky"	Mescudi; Eadeh	Ramii	2:55
5.	"Babe and I"	Mescudi; Jean-Baptiste Kouame; Darnell Jamar Donohue	Kid Cudi; Jean-Baptiste; Donohue	2:28
6.	"Willis" (featuring Chip tha Ripper)	Mescudi; Worth; Eadeh	Ramii; Tee-WaTT	4:04
7.	"Crash Test Cudi"	Mescudi; Eadeh; Benjamin Saint Fort	Ramii	2:45
8.	"Everybody Like" (featuring Pusha T)	Mescudi; Terrence LeVarr Thornton; Evan Peter Mast	E*vax	3:12
9.	"ElectroWaveBaby 2.0"	Mescudi; Jean-Baptiste Kouame; Saint Fort; Jonas Petter Berggren; Ulf Gunnar Ekberg; Malin Sofia Katarina Berggren; Jenny Cecilia Petrén	Kid Cudi; Jean-Baptiste; Steve Aoki; Bnyx	3:37
10.	"Animate" (featuring Chip tha Ripper)	Mescudi; Worth; Eadeh	Notinbed; Ramii	2:54
11.	"Round n Round" (featuring Lil Yachty)	Mescudi; Miles Parks McCollum; Sacha Paul Katz; William Paul Winter Clarke	Kid Cudi; Jean-Baptiste; Zoo Kids; Adriano; Fwdslxsh; Honeywoodsix	3:46
12.	"Dose of Dopeness" (recorded 2007)	Mescudi; Omishore	Dot da Genius	3:34
13.	"Rocket" (recorded 2011)	Mescudi; Omishore	WZRD	2:28
14.	"Ill What I Bleed"	Mescudi; Kouame; Ryan Buendia	Kid Cudi; Jean-Baptiste; Buendia; Karl Rubin	2:52
15.	"All My Life"	Mescudi; Michael Romito; Bryan Yepes; Michael Montoya; Anthony Kilhoffer	Morgoth Beatz; BRYVN; Census; Kilhoffer	4:03
16.	"I Just Wanna Get" (featuring Layzie Bone, Krayzie Bone, Chip tha Ripper and Steve Aoki)	Mescudi; Worth; Steven Howse; Anthony Henderson; Saint Fort; Mark Schick; Pablo Bowman; Christian Beau Anastasiou Astrop	Kid Cudi; Jean-Baptiste; Bnyx; Beau Nox	3:00
17.	"Moon Man Shit"	Mescudi	Honorable C.N.O.T.E.	3:08
18.	"Superboy"	Mescudi; Kouame; McCollum; Saint Fort; Justin Louis Raisen; Jeremiah Raisen	Kid Cudi; Jean-Baptiste; Lil Yachty; Justin Raisen; Bnyx; Sadpony	5:07
Total length:				59:09

Notes

- "Human Made" contains a sample of "One More Hour" as performed by Tame Impala and The Waterboy.
- "Win or Lose" contains a sample of "Enjoy The Silence" as performed by Depeche Mode.
- "Chunky" contains a sample of "Roche" as performed by Sébastien Tellier.
- "Crash Test Cudi" contains a sample of "Mmm Mmm Mmm Mmm" as performed by Crash Test Dummies.
- "ElectroWaveBaby 2.0" contains a sample of "All That She Wants" as performed by Ace of Base.
- "Dose of Dopeness" contains a sample of "Just Once" performed by Quincy Jones.

== Release history ==
Release history and formats for Insano (Nitro Mega)
Region	Date	Label(s)	Format(s)	Ref
Various	February 23, 2024	Wicked Awesome; Republic	Digital download; streaming	
