= The Kids of Widney High =

American music group

- Origin: Los Angeles, California, United States
- Genres: Ska punk, rock, outsider music
- Years active: 1988–present
- Labels: Rounder Records, Ipecac Recordings, Moonman Records
- Website: kidsofwidneyhigh.com

The Kids of Widney High is an American music group composed of students with mental disabilities from the special education J. P. Widney High School in Los Angeles, California, United States.

== History ==
The band consists of students with physical and cognitive disabilities on vocals, with the instruments played by non-disabled teachers and friends. The group originally began as a song-writing class in 1988 taught by Michael Monagan, and has evolved since into two groups, one made up of graduates that performs in local clubs and the other a group of current Widney students in the songwriting class.

The group gained a cult following, primarily thanks to their frequent live performances at larger Los Angeles venues like The Knitting Factory and Amoeba Music, as well as smaller venues such as Chain Reaction in Anaheim and The Smell in downtown LA. As a result, the group often plays at a number of ska and pop punk shows, including a stint on the Vans Warped Tour. The group has also opened for The Melvins, Fantômas, and Mr. Bungle, and have been included on several editions of the Kevin and Bean's KROQ Christmas Albums. The group's first CD, Special Music from Special Kids, was on Rounder Records in 1989. Their second CD, Let's Get Busy, was on Mike Patton's Ipecac Records label in 1999. The group's third CD, Act Your Age, was released on Moonman Records in 2003. Moonman also released a live CD, Live at the Key Club, in 2007. Such notable musicians as Kurt Cobain, Smokey Robinson, Jackson Browne, Marilyn Manson, The Kings of Nuthin' and Adam Horovitz have all cited themselves as fans of the band.

In 2005, the Kids of Widney High were featured in The Ringer, a comedy wherein Johnny Knoxville's character pretends to be developmentally disabled in order to fix the Special Olympics and gain financially through betting on it. The group is seen performing "Pretty Girls" (which was also written by several members of the group) at a dance, and again towards the end of the film singing a version of the popular 1960s song, "Respect" in which the lyrics have been rewritten so that it becomes an anthem for those with disabilities.

The Kid Cudi song "Girls" from his 2013 album Indicud contains an interpolation of "Pretty Girls". In addition, their songs have been covered by such groups as The Aquabats and Osaka Popstar.

They are chronicled in the feature-length documentary Act Your Age: The Kids of Widney High Story directed by Mathew Klickstein and Jesse Alba. Starting in November, 2020, a remastered tenth anniversary edition of the film began streaming on Troma's streaming service Troma Now. Klickstein also authored The Kids of Widney Junior High Take Over the World!, released in September 2020 by Schiffer Publishing. Thanks in part to direct promotion by Mayim Bialik, the book quickly became a bestseller on Amazon.

== Discography ==
- Special Music from Special Kids (1989) Rounder Records
- Let's Get Busy (1999) Ipecac Records
- Act Your Age (2003) Moonman Records
- Live at the Key Club (2007) Moonman Records
