= Porsche Topless =

Single by Kid Cudi

from the album Insano
- Released: June 2, 2023
- Recorded: 2021–2023
- Length: 2:50
- Label: Republic; Wicked Awesome
- Songwriters: Scott Mescudi; Benjamin Saint Fort; Jean-Baptiste Kouame
- Producers: Kid Cudi; Bnyx; Jean-Baptiste

Kid Cudi singles chronology
"Willing to Trust" (2022)	"Porsche Topless" (2023)	"Ill What I Bleed" (2023)

Lyric video
- Porsche Topless

"Porsche Topless" is a song by American musician Kid Cudi. It was first released on June 2, 2023, as the lead single for Cudi’s ninth solo album Insano (2024). The song was issued through Cudi's Wicked Awesome Records, an imprint of Republic Records.

The track was produced by American music producer Bnyx, who gained prominence producing Canadian rapper Drake's 2023 hit single "Search & Rescue". Production on the song was also handled by Jean-Baptitste and Kid Cudi.

== Background and release ==
In May 2023, Kid Cudi announced that a new track titled "Flex" would be released, playing a snippet of the track out of anticipation. However, after a lukewarm reception of the track, Kid Cudi announced that he would instead be releasing a new track on June 2, 2023, which was "Porsche Topless".

Upon release, streaming service Apple Music provided several incorrect lyrics for the track, which Kid Cudi requested to be fixed on Twitter, accusing them of coming up with lyrics. This would be fixed following his complaint.

== Composition ==
The track has been described as being a summer anthem with bouncy production and a "carefree hook". It has also been stated as being built around a descending chord progression and melodic synth refrain, overall being a very upbeat party track. Kid Cudi described the track, stating "Imagine ur floating high up in the bright blue sky on a nice warm summers day."

Lyrically, it has been stated they are about the act of being grateful and celebrating life.

== Reception ==
Alexander Cole of HotNewHipHop praised the track, highlighting the synth-heavy production, also stating that Kid Cudi did "a goob job navigating it".

== Release history ==
Release history and formats for "Porsche Topless"
Country	Date	Format	Label
United States	June 2, 2023	Streaming; digital download	Republic
