= WZRD (album) =

Studio album by WZRD
- Released: February 28, 2012
- Recorded: 2011–2012
- Studio: Scott's Crib (New York City); The Brewery Recordings (Brooklyn, New York); Wildman`s Tour Bus
- Genre: Alternative rock
- Length: 47:12
- Label: Wicked Awesome; GOOD; Universal Republic
- Producer: Dot da Genius; Kid Cudi

Singles from WZRD
- 1. "Brake" Released: January 31, 2012; 2. "Teleport 2 Me, Jamie" Released: January 31, 2012

WZRD (/dʌbəlju-zi-ɑːr-diː/) is the only studio album by American alternative rock duo WZRD, composed of musicians Dot da Genius and Kid Cudi. It was released on February 28, 2012, via Universal Republic Records and GOOD Music, also in conjunction with Cudi's then-newly founded label imprint, Wicked Awesome Records. The album was supported by the lead singles "Brake" and "Teleport 2 Me, Jamie".

The album, which was produced entirely by the duo themselves, debuted at number three on the Billboard 200 chart, with first-week sales of 66,000 physical and digital copies in the United States. The album also debuted at number one on the Top Rock Albums and Top Alternative Albums charts.

== Background ==
WZRD's lead singer Kid Cudi, first unveiled the project in January 2011 after returning to Twitter announcing a new album he was hoping to have out by the summer: "pushing for a summer release of the wizard album… wizard is a rock album, no raps, just singing. brand new thing… workin on some Jay and 'Ye shit… new mixtape A Man Named Scott thats this summah for all those who fucks with my raps, this is for u since ima be all rocked out with the wizard shit. also its free… oh and new york catch me if u can, i start filmin "how to make it" in march."

On May 31, 2011, Cudi released the first offering from his rock band, a song titled "Perfect Is the Word". It was the first song Kid Cudi and Dot da Genius worked on for the album. During a Ustream broadcast they revealed a song titled "Rocket" and announced it will serve as the second single. Although "Rocket" would fail to make the final cut for the album, the song was later officially released in 2024, on Cudi's tenth solo album Insano (Nitro Mega). On November 10, 2011, Kid Cudi revealed that the only guest appearance on the album would be Australian indie-rock band Empire of the Sun. On November 18, 2011, Kid Cudi renamed the band once again to 'WZRD', and announced that the album would be released on his 28th birthday, January 30, 2012. On November 20 Kid Cudi announced via Twitter that his upcoming album will not contain any profanity including the use of the word nigga. Kid Cudi released "Brake", the first offering from the album on November 21, 2011. On December 5, 2011, Kid Cudi released a snippet of "Teleport 2 Me, Jamie", the album's lead single.

On January 4, 2012, Cudi confirmed on Twitter that there will be a tour for the band in 2012, beginning in Europe. On January 12, Dot da Genius took to Twitter to announce that he and Cudi decided to push back WZRD to a February 28 release date: "Hey guys, WZRD update. Me and Cudi have been working on our debut album and it’s almost near completion. We are in the final stages of mastering but we really had to take time and pay attention to the sonics as this is new territory for us. With that being said, we have decided to change the release date. We are looking roughly at Feb 28th. Y’all know how Cudi is’ and I'm the same way. Everything has to be in place and now it is. I know it's late notice, we were trying to keep the date but got wrapped up making this album perfect for y’all. However, for making you guys wait a little longer we will release ‘Brake‘ & ‘Teleport 2 Me‘ on iTunes on the previously said date. Hopefully that will hold you guys over until the album drops!"

According to Kid Cudi, bands that inspired the album include Electric Light Orchestra, Jimi Hendrix, Nirvana, Pixies and Pink Floyd. On February 23, the entirety of the album was leaked online.

The album's cover art was designed by American fashion designer Virgil Abloh. The album was the first to be released under Wicked Awesome Records, a new imprint Kid Cudi had announced in April 2011, in conjunction with Kanye West's G.O.O.D. Music label and Universal Republic.

== Composition ==
=== Recording and production ===
At a private listening session in Los Angeles, Dot da Genius acknowledged that he originally wanted to record the album in the best possible studio they could be in, but Cudi interjected saying he believed the album needed a raw and gritty feel which led to recording on the tour bus and at his home. "I could have spent tons of money hiring the best people to do everything, but that's not what I’m about". The album features no profanity, however Kid Cudi didn't originally intend to record the album in that manner: "I didn’t write this album with the goal of not cursing. It just happened. When you have important things to say you don’t need to swear," Cudi informed the crowd. Although the album will not receive an explicit warning, Best Buy posed a challenge as they did try to claim it contained cursing because of the word "pussies" in the song "Upper Room". "Pussies is a word used when talking about multiple cats," Cudi told the crowd, "My daughter watches Puss in Boots, it’s not a swear word". Cudi said he had writer's block for almost 5 months because of his new sobriety, something that had never happened to him for such an extended period of time.

On working with Australian rock band Empire of the Sun, Cudi recalled "We made this record with Empire of the Sun. Ordered a bunch of dope vintage keyboards, they came over. [We were] jamming for hours. How they work is just so crazy. It’s so different from how we work and so inspirational. They ended up taking ‘The Dream Time Machine’ to another realm. Dot had the core of what the record was already done…, but we both knew something was missing. Luke [Steele] and Nick [Littlemore], they added a lot of the background ambiance, those chants and trippy sounds." Sean F. Martin, formerly of American metalcore band Hatebreed, was the guitarist on "Where Did You Sleep Last Night".

=== Music and lyrics ===
The album begins with "The Arrival", an instrumental track, where Cudi and Dot da Genius showcase their skills. "Dream Time Machine" features supporting vocals from Australian indie-rock band Empire of the Sun, as Cudi previously announced they were to be featured on the album. "Teleport 2 Me, Jamie", an ode to Cudi's then-girlfriend, features a sample from American synthpop act Desire's "Under Your Spell" (previously included on the soundtrack to the 2011 film Drive), serves as the album's lead single and was released via digital distribution on January 31, 2012. The album's eighth track "Where Did You Sleep Last Night?", is a cover of the same titled song by American rock band and grunge pioneers Nirvana, who in turn were inspired by blues guitar legend Lead Belly's rendition of the traditional folk song. Completing the album is "Upper Room", said to be the most uplifting track on the album. The last song added to the track list however, was "Dr. Pill", where Cudi touched on antidepressants: "I took a trip on antidepressant lane for a little bit. After the WZRD song “Dr. Pill" everyone thought I was talking about molly or ecstasy. But I'm talking about prescription meds. I had just gotten a shrink. I was having an emotional breakdown with this breakup. I kept trying different pills for five months. It fucked me up. They weren't working. It was every side effect on the bottle. I couldn't fuck."

== Reception ==
=== Critical response ===
Professional ratings
Aggregate scores
Source	Rating
Metacritic	50/100
Review scores
Source	Rating
AllMusic	3/5 stars
Consequence of Sound	2/5 stars
DJ Booth	2.9/5
HipHopDX	3.88/5
Now	2/5 stars
Rolling Stone	2/5 stars

WZRD received generally mixed reviews from music critics. At Metacritic, which assigns a weighted mean rating out of 100 to reviews from mainstream critics, the album received an average score of 50, based on 10 reviews. HotNewHipHop suggested that the reception to the album was a "glaring [example] of the music media immediately shutting down Black artists for stepping outside of the confines of what is deemed as ‘Black music.’"

=== Commercial performance ===
The album debuted at number three on the Billboard 200, with first-week sales of 66,000 physical and digital copies in the United States. The album also debuted on the Top Rock Albums and Top Alternative Albums at number one, and at number nine on the Canadian Albums Chart, respectively. The album to date has sold 84,000 copies in the United States.

== Controversy ==
Kid Cudi, who has had label issues in the past, was less than pleased with the support he received from his label Universal Republic, for WZRD. He claimed the album was under shipped and rushed by his major label in hopes that Kid Cudi would move on to Man on the Moon III, which led Cudi to let out his frustrations on online social networking service, Twitter:

"Ok so just a heads up, my weak ass label only shipped 55k physicals cuz they treated this like some indie side project tax right off. So i apologize on behalf of my weak ass major label. And I apologize for the lack of promo, again, my weak ass major label. They tried to rush me thru this so i can just give em another MOTM, but guess what? Fuck that, next album is WZRD. MOTM3 on hold til 2014. who mad??? not me and @DotDaGenius : ) So its def gonna be tough to find one in the stores guys, I’m sorry about that. I gotta go out and find one too, becuz my weak ass label never even gave us a copy of our own album. FAIL!!! Im lettin Universal Republic have it, fuck it. What they gon’ do, spank me?? hahahaha AND Teleport 2 Me, Jamie aint on the radio!!!! like helloooooooooo????? HIT HIT HIT!!!"

== Track listing ==
All tracks are written by WZRD, except where noted.

No.	Title	Length
1.	"The Arrival"	2:51
2.	"High Off Life"	5:13
3.	"The Dream Time Machine"	4:47
4.	"Love Hard"	4:37
5.	"Live & Learn"	4:34
6.	"Brake"	5:04
7.	"Teleport 2 Me, Jamie" (with John Padgett featuring Desire)	3:58
8.	"Where Did You Sleep Last Night?"	4:13
9.	"Efflictim"	4:27
10.	"Dr. Pill"	4:12
11.	"Upper Room" (with Jack Bruce and Pete Brown)	3:12
Total length:		47:12

Notes

- "The Dream Time Machine" features background vocals by Empire of the Sun.

Sample credits

- "Teleport 2 Me, Jamie" contains a sample of "Under Your Spell", as performed by Desire.
- "Upper Room" contains a sample of "White Room", as performed by Cream.

== Personnel ==
Credits for WZRD adapted from AllMusic.

- Virgil Abloh – cover design
- Jennifer Beal – producer
- P. Brown – composer
- J. Bruce – composer
- Sandy Brummels – director
- Chris Gehringer – mastering
- Dot da Genius – bass, drums, keyboards, mixing, percussion
- Larry Gold – conductor, string arrangements
- Noah Goldstein – audio engineer, mixing
- Kid Cudi – drums, guitar, keyboards, percussion
- Kyledidthis – design, photography
- Pamela Littky – photography
- Nick Littlemore – sound design
- Sean F. Martin – guitar
- Scott Mescudi – executive producer
- O. Omishore – composer, engineer
- Oladipo O. Omishore – executive producer
- John Padgett – composer
- Michael Riley – engineer
- Luke Steele – sound design
- Howie Weinberg – mastering
- WZRD – art direction, design, producer
- Billy Zarro – marketing, product manager

== Charts ==
=== Weekly charts ===
Chart (2012)	Peak position
Canadian Albums (Billboard)	9
US Billboard 200	3
US Top Alternative Albums (Billboard)	1
US Top Rock Albums (Billboard)	1

=== Year-end charts ===
Chart (2012)	Position
US Top Rock Albums (Billboard)	72
