= Kid Cudi discography =

Hip hop recording artist discography

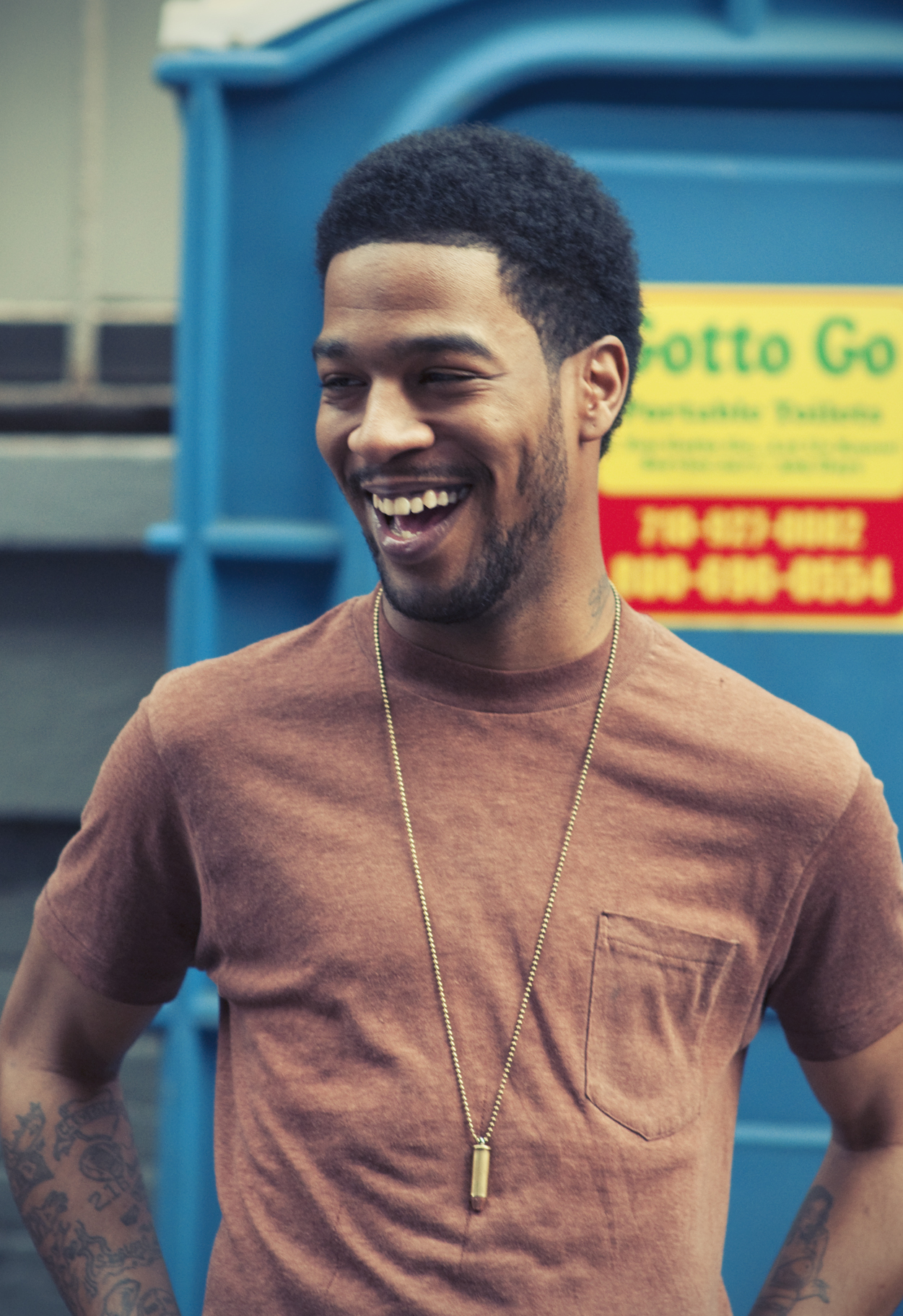
- Kid Cudi in 2010
- Studio albums: 11
- Extended plays: 4
- Compilation albums: 1
- Singles: 51
- Mixtapes: 2
- Promotional singles: 9

The discography of American musician Kid Cudi consists of eleven solo studio albums, two collaborative albums one compilation album, one box set, four extended plays (EPs), two mixtapes, 51 singles (including 16 as a featured artist), nine promotional singles and 32 music videos, the details of which are included in his videography.

Cudi was born and raised in Ohio, and his lyrics frequently explore his introspection inspired by perceived hardships of growing up as a somewhat alienated struggling artist. Cudi began his musical career sometime during 2003, and left his hometown of Cleveland to fully embark on a musical career in New York City. In November 2007, he released the song "Day 'n' Nite", which garnered minor recognition on sites such as MySpace and various underground music blogs. It soon caught the attention of Plain Pat the following year, the then-manager of high-profile rapper Kanye West—whom Cudi originally met two years prior. West signed the artist to his label GOOD Music in a joint venture with Universal Motown Records, and the label would re-issue "Day 'n' Nite" as his debut single.

Cudi's debut album, Man on the Moon: The End of Day was released in September 2009 to critical acclaim and commercial success. The album was included on Rolling Stone's 500 Greatest Albums of All Time, received quadruple platinum certification from the RIAA, three Grammy Award nominations, and is often lauded as his signature project.

Aside from his solo career, Cudi is a member of WZRD, a rock band and production team he formed with longtime friend and collaborator Dot da Genius. Additionally, Cudi is also one half of the hip hop duos Kids See Ghosts and The Scotts, alongside fellow American rappers Kanye West and Travis Scott, respectively. As of June 2020, Kid Cudi has sold a combined 22 million records in the US, according to the Recording Industry Association of America (RIAA).

== Albums ==
=== Studio albums ===
List of studio albums, with selected chart positions and certifications
Title	Album details	Peak chart positions										Sales	Certifications
Title	Album details	US	US R&B	US Rap	AUS	CAN	FRA	GER	SWI	UK	UK R&B	Sales	Certifications
Man on the Moon: The End of Day	Released: September 15, 2009; Label: Dream On, GOOD, Universal Motown; Formats: CD, LP, digital download	4	5	4	85	11	56	90	56	119	8	US: 835,025	RIAA: 4× Platinum; BPI: Gold
Man on the Moon II: The Legend of Mr. Rager	Released: November 9, 2010; Label: Dream On, GOOD, Universal Motown; Formats: CD, LP, digital download	3	1	1	65	5	77	64	36	88	12	US: 353,000	RIAA: Platinum
Indicud	Released: April 16, 2013; Label: Wicked Awesome, GOOD, Republic; Formats: CD, LP, digital download	2	1	1	28	3	57	99	46	32	2	US: 280,000	RIAA: Gold
Satellite Flight: The Journey to Mother Moon	Released: February 25, 2014; Label: Wicked Awesome, Republic; Formats: LP, digital download	4	2	2	55	7	115	—	—	67	9	US: 125,000	
Speedin' Bullet 2 Heaven	Released: December 4, 2015; Label: Wicked Awesome, Republic; Formats: Cassette, CD, digital download	36	—	—	—	—	—	—	—	—	—	US: 30,000	
Passion, Pain & Demon Slayin'	Released: December 16, 2016; Label: Wicked Awesome, Republic; Format: CD, LP, digital download, streaming	11	5	4	88	24	119	—	—	—	24	US: 49,000	
Man on the Moon III: The Chosen	Released: December 11, 2020; Label: Wicked Awesome, Republic; Format: CD, LP, digital download, streaming	2	1	1	25	2	42	—	18	26	22		
Entergalactic	Released: September 30, 2022; Label: Wicked Awesome, Republic; Format: CD, LP, digital download, streaming	13	7	—	94	20	73	—	38	95	—		
Insano	Released: January 12, 2024; Label: Wicked Awesome, Republic; Format: CD, LP, digital download, streaming	13	5	4	—	24	37	29	8	77	—		
Insano (Nitro Mega)	Released: February 23, 2024; Label: Wicked Awesome, Republic; Format: LP, digital download, streaming	—	—	—	—	—	—	—	—	—	—		
Free	Released: August 22, 2025; Label: Republic, Wicked Awesome; Format: LP, digital download, streaming	192	—	—	—	—	180	—	—	—	—		
"—" denotes a recording that did not chart or was not released in that territory.

=== Collaborative albums ===
List of collaborative studio albums, with selected chart positions
Title	Album details	Peak chart positions							Sales	Certifications
Title	Album details	US	US R&B	AUS	CAN	NZ	UK	UK R&B	Sales	Certifications
WZRD (with Dot da Genius, as WZRD)	Released: February 28, 2012; Label: Wicked Awesome, GOOD, Universal Republic; Format: CD, LP, digital download	3	—	—	9	—	—	—	US: 100,000	
Kids See Ghosts (with Kanye West as Kids See Ghosts)	Released: June 8, 2018; Label: Wicked Awesome, GOOD, Def Jam; Format: CD, LP, digital download, streaming	2	1	4	3	3	7	2	US: 142,000	RIAA: Gold; BPI: Silver

=== Compilation albums ===
List of compilations with selected details
Title	Album details	Peak chart positions			Certifications
Title	Album details	US	US R&B	CAN	Certifications
The Boy Who Flew to the Moon, Vol. 1	Released: July 8, 2022 (US); Label: Wicked Awesome, Republic; Format: CD, LP, digital download, streaming	83	36	51	BPI: Silver

=== Box sets ===
List of box sets with selected details
Title	Box set details
Man on the Moon: Trilogy	Released: November 4, 2022 (US); Label: Wicked Awesome, Republic; Format: 6xLP

== EPs ==
List of extended plays with selected details
Title	EP details
Day 'n' Nite (with Crookers)	Released: February 12, 2008 (US); Label: Fool's Gold; Format: CD, LP, digital download
Pursuit of Happiness	Released: February 7, 2010 (UK); Label: Island, Dream On, GOOD, Universal Motown; Format: CD, LP, digital download
Prime Day Show x Kid Cudi	Released: June 17, 2021 (US); Label: Wicked Awesome, Republic; Format: Digital download, streaming
Have U Bn 2 Heaven @ Nite?	Released: March 20, 2026; Label: Self-released; Format: Digital download, streaming

== Mixtapes ==
List of mixtapes with selected details
Title	Mixtape details
A Kid Named Cudi	Released: July 17, 2008 (US); Label: 10.Deep, Fool's Gold; Format: CD, LP, digital download

== Singles ==
=== As lead artist ===
List of singles as lead artist, with selected chart positions and certifications, showing year released and album name
Title	Year	Peak chart positions										Certifications	Album
Title	Year	US	US R&B/HH	US Rap	AUS	CAN	FRA	GER	NZ	SWE	UK	Certifications	Album
"Day 'n' Nite" (solo or remix vs. Crookers)	2008	3	5	—	15	10	8	13	11	31	2	RIAA: Diamond; ARIA: Gold; BPI: 2× Platinum; BVMI: 3× Gold; RMNZ: 4× Platinum	Man on the Moon: The End of Day
"Make Her Say" (featuring Kanye West and Common)	2009	43	39	11	62	78	—	85	35	—	67	RIAA: Platinum	Man on the Moon: The End of Day
"Pursuit of Happiness" (featuring MGMT and Ratatat)	2010	59	—	—	41	76	2	51	—	39	64	RIAA: 12× Platinum; ARIA: Platinum; BPI: 2× Platinum; BVMI: Gold; RMNZ: 5× Platinum	Man on the Moon: The End of Day
"We Are the World 25 for Haiti" (as part of Artists for Haiti)	2010	2	—	—	18	7	—	—	8	5	50		Non-album single
"Erase Me" (featuring Kanye West)	2010	22	— (Note: "Erase Me" did not enter the Hot R&B/Hip-Hop Songs chart, but peaked at number one on the Bubbling Under R&B/Hip-Hop Singles chart, which acts as an extension to the R&B/Hip-Hop Songs chart.)	—	50	12	—	—	22	53	58	RIAA: 2× Platinum; BPI: Silver; RMNZ: Platinum	Man on the Moon II: The Legend of Mr. Rager
"Mr. Rager"	2010	77	—	—	—	—	—	—	—	—	—	BPI: Silver; RMNZ: 2× Platinum	Man on the Moon II: The Legend of Mr. Rager
"No One Believes Me"	2011	—	—	—	—	—	—	—	—	—	—		Fright Night: Music from and Inspired by the Motion Picture
"Just What I Am" (featuring King Chip)	2012	74	17	13	32	—	189	—	—	—	—	RIAA: 2× Platinum; RMNZ: Gold	Indicud
"King Wizard"	2012	91	28	24	—	—	—	—	—	—	—		Indicud
"Immortal"	2013	—	48	—	—	—	—	—	—	—	—		Indicud
"Girls" (featuring Too Short)	2013	— (Note: "Girls" did not enter the Billboard Hot 100, but peaked at number three on the Bubbling Under Hot 100 chart, which acts as an extension to the Hot 100.)	37	—	—	—	—	—	—	—	—		Indicud
"Confused!"	2015	—	—	—	—	—	—	—	—	—	—		Speedin' Bullet 2 Heaven
"Speedin' Bullet 2 Heaven"	2015	—	—	—	—	—	—	—	—	—	—		Speedin' Bullet 2 Heaven
"Frequency"	2016	—	—	—	—	—	—	—	—	—	—		Passion, Pain & Demon Slayin'
"Surfin'" (featuring Pharrell Williams)	2016	—	—	—	77	—	—	—	—	—	—		Passion, Pain & Demon Slayin'
"Leader of the Delinquents"	2020	—	—	—	—	—	—	—	— (Note: "Leader of the Delinquents" did not enter the NZ Top 40 Singles Chart, but peaked at number 32 on the NZ Hot Singles Chart.)	—	—		Non-album singles
"The Scotts" (with Travis Scott as The Scotts)	2020	1	1	1	4	1	2	8	2	8	11	RIAA: 3× Platinum; ARIA: Gold; BPI: Silver; MC: 2× Platinum; RMNZ: Platinum; SNEP: Platinum	Non-album singles
"The Adventures of Moon Man & Slim Shady" (with Eminem)	2020	22	15	13	90	20	—	—	— (Note: "The Adventures of Moon Man & Slim Shady" did not chart on the NZ Top 40 Singles chart, but did chart at number five on the NZ Hot Singles chart.)	—	44		Non-album singles
"Want It Bad" (with Nigo)	2022	—	—	—	—	—	—	—	— (Note: "Want It Bad" did not enter the NZ Top 40 Singles Chart, but peaked at number 20 on the NZ Hot Singles Chart.)	—	—		I Know Nigo
"Stars in the Sky"	2022	—	—	—	—	—	—	—	—	—	—		Sonic the Hedgehog 2 (Music from the Motion Picture)
"Do What I Want"	2022	—	—	—	—	—	—	—	— (Note: "Do What I Want" did not enter the NZ Top 40 Singles Chart, but peaked at number 21 on the NZ Hot Singles Chart.)	—	—		Entergalactic
"Talk About Me" (with Dot da Genius, Denzel Curry and JID)	2022	—	—	—	—	—	—	—	—	—	—		Non-album single
"Willing to Trust" (with Ty Dolla Sign)	2022	—	—	—	—	—	—	—	— (Note: "Willing to Trust" did not enter the NZ Top 40 Singles Chart, but peaked at number 27 on the NZ Hot Singles Chart.)	—	—		Entergalactic
"Porsche Topless"	2023	—	—	—	—	—	—	—	—	—	—		Insano
"Guitar in My Room" (with Lyrical Lemonade and Lil Durk)	2023	—	—	—	—	—	—	—	—	—	—		All Is Yellow
"Heaven's Galaxy"	2023	—	—	—	—	—	—	—	—	—	—		Non-album single
"At the Party" (featuring Pharrell Williams and Travis Scott)	2023	—	47	—	—	—	—	—	— (Note: "At the Party" did not enter the NZ Top 40 Singles Chart, but peaked at number 16 on the NZ Hot Singles Chart.)	—	—		Insano
"Black Ops" (with Denzel Curry)	2024	—	—	—	—	—	—	—	—	—	—		Non-album singles
"Dreams I See"	2024	—	—	—	—	—	—	—	—	—	—		Non-album singles
"Don't Worry" (featuring Chip Tha Ripper)	2024	—	—	—	—	—	—	—	—	—	—		Non-album singles
"The Moon Man Survives"	2024	—	—	—	—	—	—	—	—	—	—		Non-album singles
"Forever" (with Dom Dolla)	2025	—	—	—	—	—	—	—	— (Note: "Forever" did not enter the NZ Top 40 Singles Chart, but peaked at number 4 on the NZ Hot Singles Chart.)	—	—		Non-album singles
"Neverland"	2025	—	—	—	—	—	—	—	—	—	—		Free
"Grave"	2025	—	—	—	—	—	—	—	—	—	—		Free
"Mr. Miracle"	2025	—	—	—	—	—	—	—	—	—	—		Free
"Once"	2025	—	—	—	—	—	—	—	—	—	—		Non-album single
"—" denotes a recording that did not chart or was not released in that territory.

=== As featured artist ===
List of singles as featured artist, with selected chart positions and certifications, showing year released and album name
Title	Year	Peak chart positions										Certifications	Album
Title	Year	US	US R&B	US Rap	AUS	CAN	FRA	GER	NZ	SWE	UK	Certifications	Album
"Welcome to the World" (Kevin Rudolf featuring Kid Cudi)	2009	58	—	—	42	56	—	—	—	—	77		In the City
"Rollin'" (Jackie Chain featuring Kid Cudi)	2009	—	—	—	—	—	—	—	—	—	—		The New Deal
"She Came Along" (Sharam featuring Kid Cudi)	2009	—	—	—	—	—	—	—	—	—	—		Get Wild
"Can't Stop Me" (Chip tha Ripper and The Almighty Gloryus featuring Kid Cudi)	2009	—	—	—	—	—	—	—	—	—	—		Can't Stop Me
"Memories" (David Guetta featuring Kid Cudi)	2010	46	—	—	3	18	5	6	4	14	15	RIAA: Platinum; ARIA: 2× Platinum; BPI: 2× Platinum; BVMI: 3× Platinum; IFPI SWE: 2× Platinum; RMNZ: 5× Platinum; SNEP: Gold	One Love
"That Tree" (Snoop Dogg featuring Kid Cudi)	2010	—	—	—	—	—	—	—	—	—	—		More Malice
"Symphonies" (Remix) (Dan Black featuring Kid Cudi)	2010	—	—	—	—	—	—	—	—	—	—		UN
"All of the Lights" (Kanye West featuring Rihanna, Kid Cudi and Fergie)	2010	18	2	2	24	53	—	13	13	46	15	RIAA: 7× Platinum; ARIA: 2× Platinum; RMNZ: Gold; BPI: 2× Platinum	My Beautiful Dark Twisted Fantasy
"Run" (The Knux featuring Kid Cudi)	2011	—	—	—	—	—	—	—	—	—	—		Eraser
"Focused" (Wale featuring Kid Cudi)	2011	97	—	—	—	—	—	—	—	—	—		Ambition
"Ask About Me" (Chip tha Ripper featuring Kid Cudi)	2011	—	—	—	—	—	—	—	—	—	—		Ask About Me
"Cudi the Kid" (Steve Aoki featuring Kid Cudi and Travis Barker)	2012	—	—	—	—	—	—	—	—	—	—		Wonderland
"GloryUs" (Chip tha Ripper featuring Kid Cudi)	2012	—	—	—	—	—	—	—	—	—	—		Tell Ya Friends
"Satellites" (Tassho Pearce featuring Kid Cudi)	2014	—	—	—	—	—	—	—	—	—	—		G.O.O.D. Company
"Father Stretch My Hands, Pt. 1" (Kanye West featuring Kelly Price and Kid Cudi)	2016	37	14	9	—	51	—	74	— (Note: "Father Stretch My Hands, Pt. 1" did not enter the NZ Top 40 Singles Chart, but peaked at number eight on the NZ Heatseeker Singles Chart.)	—	54	RIAA: 6× Platinum; BPI: Silver; IFPI Denmark: Gold	The Life of Pablo
"Fast Life" (LaKeith Stanfield featuring Kid Cudi)	2025	—	—	—	—	—	—	—	—	—	—		Non-album single
"Everywhere I Go (Remind Me)" (Bnyx featuring Kid Cudi & Röyksopp)	2026	—	—	—	—	—	—	—	—	—	—		Non-album single
"—" denotes a recording that did not chart or was not released in that territory.

=== Promotional singles ===
List of promotional singles, with selected chart positions, showing year released and album name
Title	Year	Peak chart positions							Album
Title	Year	US	US R&B	CAN	FRA	IRL	NZ Hot	UK	Album
"Did It Again (Remix)" (Shakira featuring Kid Cudi)	2009	—	—	—	—	17	—	26	She Wolf
"Whatever U Want (G.O.O.D. Music Has Arrived Remix)" (Consequence featuring Kanye West, Common, Kid Cudi and Big Sean)	2010	—	—	—	—	—	—	—	Movies on Demand
"REVOFEV"	2010	—	—	—	—	—	—	—	Man on the Moon II: The Legend of Mr. Rager
"All Summer" (with Rostam Batmanglij and Bethany Cosentino)	2010	—	—	—	—	—	—	—	Non-album single
"Going to the Ceremony"	2013	—	—	—	—	—	—	—	Satellite Flight: The Journey to Mother Moon
"Love"	2015	— (Note: "Love" did not enter the Billboard Hot 100, but peaked at number one on the Bubbling Under Hot 100 chart, which acts as an extension to the Hot 100.)	—	—	—	—	7	—	The Boy Who Flew to the Moon, Vol. 1
"Wedding Tux"	2015	—	—	—	—	—	—	—	Speedin' Bullet 2 Heaven
"Judgmental Cunt"	2015	—	—	—	—	—	—	—	Speedin' Bullet 2 Heaven
"Baptized in Fire" (featuring Travis Scott)	2016	— (Note: "Baptized in Fire" did not enter the Billboard Hot 100, but peaked at number three on the Bubbling Under Hot 100 Singles chart.)	47	—	—	—	—	—	Passion, Pain & Demon Slayin'
"She Knows This"	2020	49	9	59	142	74	7	—	Man on the Moon III: The Chosen
"Heaven on Earth"	2020	85	24	81	—	—	—	—	Man on the Moon III: The Chosen
"Transparent Soul (Remix)" (Willow featuring Kid Cudi and Travis Barker)	2021	—	—	—	—	—	—	—	non-album single
"Just Look Up" (with Ariana Grande)	2021	—	—	—	—	—	7	—	Don't Look Up
"Most Ain't Dennis"	2023	—	—	—	—	—	—	—	Insano
"Ill What I Bleed"	2023	—	—	—	—	—	—	—	Insano (Nitro Mega)
"It Takes Two" (with Camila Cabello, Anna Kendrick, Justin Timberlake, Eric André, Daveed Diggs and Kid Cudi)	2023	—	—	—	—	—	—	—	Trolls Band Together
"—" denotes a recording that did not chart or was not released in that territory.

== Other charted and certified songs ==
List of songs, with selected chart positions and certifications, showing year released and album name
Title	Year	Peak chart positions								Certifications	Album
Title	Year	US	US R&B/HH	AUS	CAN	FRA	IRL	NZ Hot	UK	Certifications	Album
"Maui Wowie"	2008	71	15	—	50	—	—	—	—		A Kid Named Cudi
"Welcome to Heartbreak" (Kanye West featuring Kid Cudi)	2008	—	—	—	—	—	—	—	112	RIAA: Gold	808s & Heartbreak
"Soundtrack 2 My Life"	2009	— (Note: "Soundtrack 2 My Life" did not enter the Billboard Hot 100, but peaked at number five on the Bubbling Under Hot 100 Singles chart, which acts as an extension to the Hot 100.)	—	—	—	—	—	—	—	RIAA: 3× Platinum; RMNZ: Gold	Man on the Moon: The End of Day
"Cudi Zone"	2009	—	—	—	—	—	—	—	—	RIAA: Platinum	Man on the Moon: The End of Day
"Up Up & Away"	2009	—	—	—	—	—	—	—	—	RIAA: 2× Platinum	Man on the Moon: The End of Day
"Marijuana"	2010	54	—	—	68	—	—	—	—	RIAA: Gold	Man on the Moon II: The Legend of Mr. Rager
"Scott Mescudi vs. the World" (featuring Cee Lo Green)	2010	92	—	—	88	—	—	—	—		Man on the Moon II: The Legend of Mr. Rager
"Gorgeous" (Kanye West featuring Kid Cudi and Raekwon)	2010	— (Note: "Gorgeous" did not enter the Billboard Hot 100, but peaked at number 23 on the Bubbling Under Hot 100 Singles chart, which acts as an extension to the Hot 100.)	40	—	—	—	—	—	—	RIAA: Platinum; RMNZ: Gold	My Beautiful Dark Twisted Fantasy
"Welcome to the World" (T.I. featuring Kanye West and Kid Cudi)	2010	— (Note: "Welcome to the World" did not enter the Billboard Hot 100, but peaked at number 17 on the Bubbling Under Hot 100 Singles chart, which acts as an extension to the Hot 100.)	—	—	—	—	—	—	—		No Mercy
"The Morning" (with Raekwon, Pusha T, Common, 2 Chainz, Cyhi the Prynce, D'banj and Kanye West)	2012	— (Note: "The Morning" did not enter the Billboard Hot 100, but peaked at number 19 on the Bubbling Under Hot 100 Singles chart, which acts as an extension to the Hot 100.)	49	—	—	—	—	—	—		Cruel Summer
"Creepers"	2012	—	— (Note: "Creepers" did not enter the Hot R&B/Hip-Hop Songs chart, but peaked at number five on the Bubbling Under R&B/Hip-Hop Singles chart, which acts as an extension to the R&B/Hip-Hop Songs chart.)	—	—	—	—	—	—		Cruel Summer
"Unfuckwittable"	2013	—	— (Note: "Unfuckwittable" did not enter the Hot R&B/Hip-Hop Songs chart, but peaked at number eight on the Bubbling Under R&B/Hip-Hop Singles chart, which acts as an extension to the R&B/Hip-Hop Songs chart.)	—	—	—	—	—	—		Indicud
"Solo Dolo, Pt. II" (featuring Kendrick Lamar)	2013	—	— (Note: "Solo Dolo, Part II" did not enter the Hot R&B/Hip-Hop Songs chart, but peaked at number one on the Bubbling Under R&B/Hip-Hop Singles chart, which acts as an extension to the R&B/Hip-Hop Songs chart.)	—	—	—	—	—	—		Indicud
"Brothers" (featuring King Chip and ASAP Rocky)	2013	—	47	—	—	—	—	—	—		Indicud
"Through the Late Night" (Travis Scott featuring Kid Cudi)	2016	— (Note: "Through the Late Night" did not enter the Billboard Hot 100, but peaked at number seven on the Bubbling Under Hot 100 Singles chart.)	43	—	—	—	—	—	—	RIAA: 2× Platinum; ARIA: Gold; MC: Platinum	Birds in the Trap Sing McKnight
"Feel the Love" (with Kanye West as Kids See Ghosts featuring Pusha T)	2018	47	24	57	35	185	50	—	47	RIAA: Gold	Kids See Ghosts
"Fire" (with Kanye West as Kids See Ghosts)	2018	67	32	69	49	—	58	—	—	RIAA: Gold	Kids See Ghosts
"4th Dimension" (with Kanye West as Kids See Ghosts featuring Louis Prima)	2018	42	21	46	27	—	49	1	46	RIAA: Platinum	Kids See Ghosts
"Freeee (Ghost Town, Pt. 2)" (with Kanye West as Kids See Ghosts featuring Ty Dolla Sign)	2018	62	30	72	58	—	66	—	—		Kids See Ghosts
"Reborn" (with Kanye West as Kids See Ghosts)	2018	39	18	55	30	165	48	2	48	RIAA: Platinum	Kids See Ghosts
"Kids See Ghosts" (with Kanye West as Kids See Ghosts featuring Yasiin Bey)	2018	73	37	84	53	—	64	—	—	RIAA: Gold	Kids See Ghosts
"Cudi Montage" (with Kanye West as Kids See Ghosts)	2018	69	34	89	61	—	67	—	—	RIAA: Gold	Kids See Ghosts
"Stop Trying to Be God" (Travis Scott featuring Kid Cudi, Philip Bailey, James Blake, and Stevie Wonder)	2018	27	18	87	19	—	—	—	70	RIAA: Platinum; ARIA: Gold; MC: Platinum; BPI: Silver	Astroworld
"Beautiful Trip"	2020	100	32	—	96	—	—	—	—		Man on the Moon III: The Chosen
"Tequila Shots"	2020	41	7	—	52	95	51	6	86	RIAA: Platinum; RMNZ: Gold	Man on the Moon III: The Chosen
"Another Day"	2020	64	16	—	70	171	—	9	—		Man on the Moon III: The Chosen
"Dive"	2020	80	22	—	80	—	—	—	—		Man on the Moon III: The Chosen
"Damaged"	2020	91	28	—	87	—	—	—	—		Man on the Moon III: The Chosen
"Show Out" (with Skepta and Pop Smoke)	2020	54	12	—	42	78	29	5	37	BPI: Silver; RMNZ: Gold	Man on the Moon III: The Chosen
"Solo Dolo, Pt. III"	2020	78	21	—	75	—	—	—	—		Man on the Moon III: The Chosen
"Sad People"	2020	90	27	—	83	—	—	—	—		Man on the Moon III: The Chosen
"Elsie's Baby Boy (Flashback)"	2020	— (Note: "Elsie's Baby Boy (Flashback)" did not enter the Billboard Hot 100, but peaked at number four on the Bubbling Under Hot 100 chart, which acts as an extension to the Hot 100.)	39	—	—	—	—	—	—		Man on the Moon III: The Chosen
"Sept. 16"	2020	— (Note: "Sept. 16" did not enter the Billboard Hot 100, but peaked at number three on the Bubbling Under Hot 100 chart, which acts as an extension to the Hot 100.)	37	—	—	—	—	—	—		Man on the Moon III: The Chosen
"The Void"	2020	— (Note: "The Void" did not enter the Billboard Hot 100, but peaked at number one on the Bubbling Under Hot 100 chart, which acts as an extension to the Hot 100.)	33	—	—	—	—	—	—		Man on the Moon III: The Chosen
"Lovin' Me" (featuring Phoebe Bridgers)	2020	— (Note: "Lovin' Me" did not enter the Billboard Hot 100, but peaked at number five on the Bubbling Under Hot 100 chart, which acts as an extension to the Hot 100.)	40	—	—	—	—	—	—		Man on the Moon III: The Chosen
"The Pale Moonlight"	2020	— (Note: "The Pale Moonlight" did not enter the Billboard Hot 100, but peaked at number eight on the Bubbling Under Hot 100 chart, which acts as an extension to the Hot 100.)	44	—	—	—	—	—	—		Man on the Moon III: The Chosen
"Rockstar Knights" (with Trippie Redd)	2020	— (Note: "Rockstar Knights" did not enter the Billboard Hot 100, but peaked at number two on the Bubbling Under Hot 100 chart, which acts as an extension to the Hot 100.)	35	97	—	—	—	—	—		Man on the Moon III: The Chosen
"4 Da Kidz"	2020	— (Note: "4 Da Kidz" did not enter the Billboard Hot 100, but peaked at number 10 on the Bubbling Under Hot 100 chart, which acts as an extension to the Hot 100.)	47	—	—	—	—	—	—		Man on the Moon III: The Chosen
"Lord I Know"	2020	— (Note: "Lord I Know" did not enter the Billboard Hot 100, but peaked at number 13 on the Bubbling Under Hot 100 chart, which acts as an extension to the Hot 100.)	50	—	—	—	—	—	—		Man on the Moon III: The Chosen
"M3tamorphosis" (Playboi Carti featuring Kid Cudi)	2020	99	37	—	90	—	—	—	—		Whole Lotta Red
"Moon" (Kanye West featuring Don Toliver and Kid Cudi)	2021	17	7	—	21	—	—	—	—	MC: Gold; RIAA: Platinum	Donda
"IMY2" (Drake featuring Kid Cudi)	2021	22	16	—	37	—	—	—	—		Certified Lover Boy
"Rock n Roll" (Pusha T featuring Kanye West and Kid Cudi)	2022	78	25	—	67	—	—	11	98		It's Almost Dry
"New Mode"	2022	—	—	—	—	—	—	30	—		Entergalactic
"Somewhere to Fly" (with Don Toliver)	2022	—	—	—	—	—	—	39	—		Entergalactic
"Looove" (Travis Scott featuring Kid Cudi)	2023	49	23	73	40	107	—	—	—		Utopia
"Get Off Me" (with Travis Scott)	2024	— (Note: "Get Off Me" did not enter the Billboard Hot 100, but peaked at number three on the Bubbling Under Hot 100 chart, which acts as an extension to the Hot 100.)	48	—	—	—	—	11	—		Insano
"Wow" (with ASAP Rocky)	2024	—	—	—	—	—	—	18	—		Insano
"ElectroWaveBaby"	2024	—	—	—	—	—	—	19	—		Insano
"X & Cud" (with XXXTentacion)	2024	—	—	—	—	—	—	25	—		Insano
"—" denotes a recording that did not chart or was not released in that territory.

== Guest appearances ==
Key
†	Indicates soundtrack

List of non-single guest appearances, with other performing artists, showing year released and album name
Title	Year	Other artist(s)	Album
"Wasting My Minutes"	2008	88-Keys	Adam's Case Files
"Embrace the Martian"	2008	Crookers	Tons of Friends
"Find a Way" (Game & Switch Mix)/"Lunar Camel"	2008	Santigold	Top Ranking: A Diplo Dub
"Intro"	2008	DJ E-V	SpinFest: The Mixtape 2008
"Interlude"	2008	DJ E-V	SpinFest: The Mixtape 2008
"Outro"	2008	DJ E-V	SpinFest: The Mixtape 2008
"Me + My Sneakers"	2008	A-Trak	Running Man: Nike+ Original Run
"Ho' Is Short for Honey"	2008	88-Keys	The Death of Adam
"Welcome to Heartbreak"	2008	Kanye West	808s & Heartbreak
"Therapy"	2009	The Alchemist, Evidence, Blu, Talib Kweli	Chemical Warfare
"Take Em High"	2009	K. Sparks & Pajozo	Popular Demand
"Buggin' Out '09"	2009	J.Period, Q-Tip, Consequence	The [Abstract] Best Vol. 1
"Sky High"	2009	The Kickdrums	Smash the System
"Boom Boom Style" (Zuper Blahq Megamix)	2009	The Black Eyed Peas	Invasion of Boom Boom Pow – Megamix E.P.
"Don't Trust Me" (Benny Blanco Remix)	2009	3OH!3	Want
"Switchin' Lanes"	2009	none	The South Central EP (Music from Midnight Club: Los Angeles South Central)
"Everything Is Broken"	2009	Mr Hudson	Straight No Chaser
"Already Home"	2009	Jay-Z	The Blueprint 3
"Elevatas"	2009	Robin Thicke	Sex Therapy: The Session
"Do My Do"	2009	Mickey Factz	—N/a
"Floatin' in the Sky"	2009	N.O.R.E.	—N/a
"Girls, Sounds & Colors"	2009	Rich Hil	Hippies Most Wanted Vol. 2
"Trippy"	2009	Rich Hil	—N/a
"Riot Song" (Remix)	2010	Johnny Polygon	Rebel Without Applause
"Ur Killin' Me"	2010	Cam'ron, Vado	Boss of All Bosses 2.5
"All Talk"	2010	Chip tha Ripper, Christian Bale	Independence Day
"Won't You Tell Me"	2010	Rich Hil	—N/a
"EPS"	2010	Rich Hil	Limosa Nostra Act 1
"Dangerous"	2010	Rich Hil	—N/a
"On the Spot"	2010	DJ Green Lantern	Invasion Radio 2K10
"GOOD Friday"	2010	Kanye West, Big Sean, Pusha T, Common, Charlie Wilson	GOOD Fridays releases
"Christian Dior Denim Flow"	2010	Kanye West, John Legend, Pusha T, Lloyd Banks, Ryan Leslie	GOOD Fridays releases
"The Joy"	2010	Kanye West, Pete Rock, Charlie Wilson, Curtis Mayfield, Jay-Z	GOOD Fridays releases
"Gorgeous"	2010	Kanye West, Raekwon	My Beautiful Dark Twisted Fantasy
"Welcome to the World"	2010	T.I., Kanye West	No Mercy
"You Can Run"	2011	Bryan Greenberg	We Don't Have Forever
"Cool Head"	2011	Travis Barker	Give the Drummer Some
"Don't Kick the Chair"	2011	Dia Frampton	Red
"On My Own"	2011	Consequence	Curb Certified
"Ride 4 You"	2012	Chip tha Ripper, Far East Movement	Tell Ya Friends
"The Ruler and the Killer"	2012	none	The Hunger Games: Songs from District 12 and Beyond
"Old School Caddy"	2012	Hit-Boy	HITStory
"Pursuit of Happiness (Steve Aoki Remix)"	2012	none	Project X (Original Motion Picture Soundtrack)
"Like It or Love It"	2012	Kreayshawn	Somethin' 'Bout Kreay
"The Morning"	2012	Raekwon, Pusha T, Common, 2 Chainz, Cyhi the Prynce, D'banj	Cruel Summer
"Creepers"	2012	none	Cruel Summer
"She Hates Me"	2012	Big Boi	Vicious Lies and Dangerous Rumors
"First Chain"	2013	Big Sean, Nas	Hall of Fame
"Vortex"	2013	King Chip, Pusha T	44108
"Guilt Trip"	2013	Kanye West	Yeezus
"Hero"	2014	Skylar Grey	Need for Speed: Original Motion Picture Soundtrack
"Scorn"	2014	Audio Push, Hit-Boy, Kent M$ney	We the Plug
"Waves"	2016	Kanye West, Chris Brown	The Life of Pablo
"Through the Late Night"	2016	Travis Scott	Birds in the Trap Sing McKnight
"The Rage"	2018	none	Rampage – Original Motion Picture Soundtrack
"ASAP Forever" (Remix)	2018	ASAP Rocky, T.I., Moby	Testing
"No Mistakes"	2018	Kanye West, Charlie Wilson, Caroline Shaw	Ye
"Ghost Town"	2018	Kanye West, PartyNextDoor, 070 Shake	Ye
"Stop Trying to Be God"	2018	Travis Scott, Philip Bailey, James Blake, Stevie Wonder	Astroworld
"Lost"	2018	Quavo	Quavo Huncho
"Dangerous"	2019	Schoolboy Q	Crash Talk
"On My Own"	2019	Jaden Smith	ERYS
"Privilege" (Remix)	2019	The Weeknd	—N/a
"A Sweeter Place"	2020	Selena Gomez	Rare
"Temptations"	2020	Ty Dolla Sign	Featuring Ty Dolla Sign
"M3tamorphosis"	2020	Playboi Carti	Whole Lotta Red
"Moon Man"	2021	YSL Records, Young Thug, Strick	Slime Language 2 / Strick Land
"8-Ball"	2021	Pop Smoke	Faith
"Peace of Mind"	2021	Skepta, Teezee	All In
"Moon"	2021	Kanye West, Don Toliver	Donda
"Remote Control, Pt. 2"	2021	Kanye West, Young Thug	Donda
"IMY2"	2021	Drake	Certified Lover Boy
"Guns Go Bang"	2021	Jay-Z	The Harder They Fall (The Motion Picture Soundtrack)
"Rock n Roll"	2022	Pusha T, Kanye West	It's Almost Dry
"Company"	2022	Lil Nas X	—N/a
"Summertime"	2023	Skrillex	Don't Get Too Close
"Looove"	2023	Travis Scott	Utopia
"All My Life"	2023	1017 ALYX 9SM	Compilation V1
"Perfect"	2023	Justin Timberlake, Eric André, Daveed Diggs, Troye Sivan	Trolls Band Together (soundtrack)
"Better Place (Family Harmony)"	2023	Justin Timberlake, Eric André, Daveed Diggs, Troye Sivan, Camila Cabello, Anna Kendrick	Trolls Band Together (soundtrack)
"Better Place (Reunion)"	2023	NSYNC, Eric André, Daveed Diggs, Troy Sivan	Trolls Band Together (soundtrack)
"Family"	2023	Justin Timberlake, Eric André, Daveed Diggs, Anna Kendrick, Camila Cabello, Troy Sivan	Trolls Band Together (soundtrack)
"Warlords"	2024	Childish Gambino	—N/a
"Godqueen"	2024	Jeymes Samuel	The Book of Clarence (soundtrack)
"Divine"	2024	Saleka	Lady Raven
"Gun to My Head"	2024	¥$	Vultures 2 (Digital Deluxe)
"Not Ordinary"	2026	Illenium	Odyssey
"No More Ghosts"	2026	Yeat	ADL

== Production discography ==
List of production (songwriting and arrangement) and sole songwriting credits (excluding guest appearances, interpolations, and samples)
Track(s)	Year	Credit	Artist(s)	Album
5. "Heartless"	2008	Songwriter	Kanye West	808s & Heartbreak
6. "Paranoid"	2008	Additional vocals, songwriter	Kanye West	808s & Heartbreak
8. "RoboCop"	2008	Songwriter	Kanye West	808s & Heartbreak
7. "Day 'n' Nite"	2009	Producer (with Dot da Genius)	Kid Cudi	Man on the Moon: The End of Day
8. "Sky Might Fall"	2009	Producer (with Kanye West)	Kid Cudi	Man on the Moon: The End of Day
5. "Marijuana"	2010	Producer (with Dot da Genius and Mike Dean)	Kid Cudi	Man on the Moon II: The Legend of Mr. Rager
17. "Trapped in My Mind"	2010	Producer (with Dot da Genius)	Kid Cudi	Man on the Moon II: The Legend of Mr. Rager
7. "You Be Killin Em"	2010	Co-producer (with Ryan Leslie)	Fabolous	There Is No Competition 2: The Grieving Music EP
9. "Cool Head"; (featuring Kid Cudi)	2011	Co-producer (with Travis Barker and Edit)	Travis Barker	Give the Drummer Some
1. "No One Believes Me"	2011	Co-producer (with Dot da Genius)	Kid Cudi	Various artists – Music from and Inspired by the Motion Picture Fright Night
3. "Free"; (featuring will.i.am)	2011	Songwriter	Natalia Kills	Perfectionist
10. "Murder to Excellence"	2011	Backing vocals, songwriter	JAY-Z, Kanye West	Watch The Throne
13. "Illest Motherfucker Alive"	2011	Backing vocals, songwriter	JAY-Z, Kanye West	Watch The Throne
16. "The Joy"	2011	Backing vocals, songwriter	JAY-Z, Kanye West	Watch The Throne
6. "Like It or Love It"; (featuring Kid Cudi)	2012	Co-producer (with Free School)	Kreayshawn	Somethin' 'Bout Kreay
All tracks	2013	Producer	Kid Cudi	Indicud
8. "Guilt Trip"	2013	Songwriter, additional vocals	Kanye West	Yeezus
Tracks 1, 4–10	2014	Producer	Kid Cudi	Satellite Flight: The Journey to Mother Moon
All tracks	2015	Producer	Kid Cudi	Speedin' Bullet 2 Heaven
Tracks 1–3, 7–15, 17–18	2016	Producer	Kid Cudi	Passion, Pain & Demon Slayin'
19. "Lost"; (featuring Kid Cudi)	2018	Producer (with Quavo and Joseph DaVinci)	Quavo	Quavo Huncho
Tracks 2, 4–7	2018	Producer	Kids See Ghosts	Kids See Ghosts
13. "A Sweeter Place"; (featuring Kid Cudi)	2020	Producer (with Dot da Genius, Mike Dean, Plain Pat and Ian Kirkpatrick)	Selena Gomez	Rare
All tracks	2020	Producer	Kid Cudi	Man on the Moon III: The Chosen

== See also ==
- List of songs recorded by Kid Cudi
- Kid Cudi videography
- Kids See Ghosts discography
- Kid Cudi production discography
- WZRD discography
- List of awards and nominations received by Kid Cudi
