= To the Moon World Tour =

2022 concert tour by Kid Cudi

- Tour by Kid Cudi
- Location: Asia; Europe; North America
- Associated album: Man on the Moon III: The Chosen
- Start date: August 16, 2022
- End date: November 22, 2022
- Legs: 3
- No. of shows: 26
- Supporting acts: Denzel Curry; 070 Shake; Strick; JP the Wavy; Monjola; Knucks
- Website: www.kidcudi.com/tour

Kid Cudi concert chronology
- Passion, Pain & Demon Slayin' Tour (2017); To the Moon World Tour (2022)

The To the Moon World Tour was the fifth concert tour by American rapper Kid Cudi. The excursion, which was his first tour in five years, also served as his first arena tour. The tour began in Portland on August 18, 2022 and concluded in Milan on November 22, 2022. The tour dates included 26 cities, on three continents.

== Background ==
On December 11, 2020, Kid Cudi released his seventh solo album, the long awaited Man on the Moon III: The Chosen. On September 25, 2021, Cudi revealed he was preparing for an upcoming concert tour in promotion for Man on the Moon III, when he wrote on Twitter that he's "been bookin venues for months." Cudi ultimately announced his first arena tour in June 2022, with To the Moon World Tour. On July 4, 2022, Kid Cudi took to Twitter to announce the release of his first "best-of" album, along with the reissue of his debut mixtape A Kid Named Cudi on July 15 to digital streaming platforms (DSP). He revealed the compilation, titled The Boy Who Flew to the Moon, Vol. 1, would be released on July 8. Following the release of both projects, Cudi revealed on Twitter he would be performing songs from his debut mixtape, as well as "Love", the bonus track from his greatest hits compilation. American musicians Don Toliver, Denzel Curry, 070 Shake, and Strick, were scheduled as the opening acts for the North American leg, however, on August 12, Toliver announced he would not be able to fulfill his duties on the tour due to "production/logistical issues."

=== Moon Man's Landing ===
Moon Man's Landing was a one-day music festival that took place on Saturday, September 17, 2022. The event was held at the West Bank Flats in Cudi’s hometown of Cleveland, Ohio. The line-up for the festival includes musicians such as Don Toliver, Playboi Carti, Haim, Bone Thugs-n-Harmony, Pusha T, Jaden and Chip tha Ripper, among others. Following the success, Cudi confirmed he would continue the festival annually.

== Set list ==
This set list is representative of the first show in Portland, performed on August 18, 2022. It does not represent all concerts for the duration of the tour.

Set list

1. "Down & Out"
2. "Tequila Shots"
3. "She Knows This"
4. "Dive"
5. "Just What I Am" (featuring King Chip)
6. "T.G.I.F." (featuring King Chip)
7. "Ghost!"
8. "Solo Dolo, Pt. III"
9. "By Design"
10. "Man on the Moon (The Anthem)"
11. "Mr. Rager"
12. "The Void"
13. "Memories"
14. "Pursuit of Happiness" (Steve Aoki Remix)

Encore

1. "The Prayer"
2. "Love."

== Tour dates ==
List of concerts, showing date, city, country, venue, and opening acts
Date	City	Country	Venue	Opening acts
Leg 1 – North America
August 18, 2022	Portland	United States	Veterans Memorial Coliseum	Denzel Curry; Strick
August 19, 2022	Seattle	United States	Climate Pledge Arena	Denzel Curry; Strick
August 21, 2022	Oakland	United States	Oakland Arena	Denzel Curry; Strick
August 23, 2022	San Diego	United States	Pechanga Arena	Denzel Curry; Strick
August 24, 2022	Inglewood	United States	Kia Forum	Denzel Curry; Strick
August 25, 2022	Phoenix	United States	Footprint Center	070 Shake; Strick
August 27, 2022	Denver	United States	Ball Arena	070 Shake; Strick
August 30, 2022	Dallas	United States	American Airlines Center	070 Shake; Strick
August 31, 2022	Austin	United States	Moody Center	070 Shake; Strick
September 1, 2022	Houston	United States	Toyota Center	070 Shake; Strick
September 4, 2022	Miami	United States	FTX Arena	Denzel Curry; 070 Shake; Strick
September 6, 2022	Atlanta	United States	State Farm Arena	070 Shake; Strick
September 8, 2022	Washington, D.C.	United States	Capital One Arena	070 Shake; Strick
September 9, 2022	Philadelphia	United States	Wells Fargo Center	070 Shake; Strick
September 10, 2022	Boston	United States	TD Garden	070 Shake; Strick
September 12, 2022	Brooklyn	United States	Barclays Center	070 Shake; Strick
September 14, 2022	Toronto	Canada	Scotiabank Arena	070 Shake; Strick
September 16, 2022	Chicago	United States	United Center	070 Shake; Strick
September 17, 2022	Cleveland (Note: The concert of September 17, 2022 at West Bank Flats in Cleveland is part of Moon Man's Landing festival.)	United States	West Bank Flats	—N/a
Leg 2 – Asia
October 17, 2022	Kōtō	Japan	Toyosu PIT	JP The Wavy
Leg 3 – Europe
November 12, 2022	Berlin	Germany	Verti Music Hall	Monjola
November 13, 2022	Amsterdam	The Netherlands	AFAS Live	Monjola
November 15, 2022	London	England	The O2	Knucks
November 17, 2022	Brussels	Belgium	Palais 12	Monjola
November 20, 2022	Paris	France	Zénith Paris	Monjola
November 22, 2022	Milan	Italy	Fabrique	Monjola

=== Cancelled show ===
Date	City	Country	Venue	Reason
September 23, 2022	Vancouver	Canada	Rogers Arena	Unforeseen circumstances

== See also ==
- List of songs recorded by Kid Cudi
