= Love (Kid Cudi song) =

Promotional single by Kid Cudi

from the album The Boy Who Flew to the Moon, Vol. 1
- Released: March 3, 2015
- Recorded: 2013
- Length: 5:28
- Label: Wicked Awesome; Republic
- Songwriters: Scott Mescudi; Oladipo Omishore; Evan Mast; Mike Stroud
- Producers: Kid Cudi; Dot da Genius

Official audio
- "Love" on YouTube

"Love" (stylized as "love.") is a song by American musician Kid Cudi. Originally recorded in 2013 for his fourth solo album Satellite Flight: The Journey to Mother Moon (2014), the song failed to make the final cut for the album, however Cudi would release the song on March 3, 2015 as a promotional recording via his verified SoundCloud page. Although Kid Cudi had declared that due to copyright issues the song would never be released officially, it was ultimately released in 2022, re-mastered and included as a bonus track on his first greatest hits compilation The Boy Who Flew to the Moon, Vol. 1, issued on July 8.

== Background and release ==
On March 3, 2015, Kid Cudi released "Love", his first song since his surprise album Satellite Flight: The Journey to Mother Moon was put on the market in February 2014. The song was originally recorded for Satellite Flight and was built around a sample of "Sunblocks" by American electronic rock duo Ratatat. Cudi previously sampled Ratatat for "Heaven at Nite" from his breakout mixtape A Kid Named Cudi (2008), and later collaborated with the duo on "Pursuit of Happiness" and "Alive" from his commercial debut album Man on the Moon: The End of Day (2009).

Cudi released the song via his official SoundCloud account with a statement that read:

"Something I made during the SF sessions. produced by me, keys by Dot. Sample is from one of my favorite Ratatat jams "Sunblocks". And love to Evan and Mike for allowing me to release it.. For you. Hope it brings you some peace if you have a lonely heart out there. byeeeee :)"

The song’s positive reception led many a fan requesting Cudi on social media to release the song via digital streaming platforms (DSP); on January 7, 2022, Cudi would finally reveal why the song had been officially unreleased, citing sample clearance issues—specifically Ratatat refusing to clear the sample used from their 2010 song "Sunblocks", taken from their fourth album LP4. However, on July 8, 2022, Cudi's first greatest hits album The Boy Who Flew to the Moon, Vol. 1 featured a re-mastered version of "Love" as the only bonus track, and in an act of fan service was finally made available on DSPs and for digital download.

== Music and lyrics ==
The song's lyrics describe love being the cure to loneliness. Andy James of DJBooth.net noted "Cudi's hook is a necessary reminder that this pain isn't permanent, that rebirth is possible." Carlo Affatigato of Auralcrave wrote "'love.' is an optimistic song about the way we have to fight our pain and chase our inner peace. The track is strictly related to Kid Cudi's personal story: he dealt with depression and drug addiction, and the healing path was a process that required a lot of personal growth."

The music heavily samples the song "Sunblocks", composed by Evan Mast and Mike Stroud of Ratatat. Produced by Cudi himself, the song features additional production from Cudi's WZRD bandmate, Dot da Genius. Alex Hudson of Exclaim! wrote “the track begins with a chilled-out groove before swelling with wailing guitars (or are those synths?) and then bursting dramatically into a melodic, uplifting refrain.”

== Composition ==
The track runs at 139 BPM and is in the key of F major.

== Critical reception ==
Upon its initial release in 2015, "Love" went on to receive positive reviews from fans and critics alike. Zach Frydenlund of Complex praised the song's inspirational message: "the emotional and uplifting song features Cudi pouring his heart out while encouraging his listeners to stay positive and don't get down on themselves with the lyrics, 'Don't be so down, come on young homie, you'll be ok, you'll find real love.'" Misha Sesar of The Fader wrote "the song has a heartwarming melody that borrows Ratatat's soothing tones from their 2010 song "Sunblocks" paired with Cudi's soft dreaming vocals. It's a feel-good song that Cudi breathes his soul into it, singing, 'hopeful is all I know.' And after listening to this, hopeful is truly all I feel."

Camille Augustin of Vibe called the song empowering. Kevin Montes of TheYoungFolks called the song beautiful. Armon Sadler of Uproxx wrote "the song captures the introspective and optimistic nature commonplace to much of his content."

In 2017, Craig Lee of Medium.com, dedicated an article to the song concluding with “‘Love.’ can be the track to save a life and breathe fresh energy into a dimmed spirit. Cudi’s discography is too vast to even begin to tell you how much he’s helped youth to adults. ‘Love.’ is just the tip of the iceberg.”

In 2018, Andy James of DJBooth.net dedicated an article to the song, stating "[the song]'s opening verse—simple yet soul-stirring, like most of his best work—is an all-too-familiar reflection of the 'pool of emotions' that threatens to drown a lonely, depressed heart. Unlike most lonely songs that nurse a newly-broken heart or alleviate the anguish of unrequited love, 'love.' speaks specifically to an empty heart, the kind hollowed out by self-loathing, social anxiety and suicidal thoughts."

In 2022, Carlo Affatigato of Auralcrave also wrote an article dedicated to "Love", calling the song "a beautiful track full of harmony, with lyrics expressing an important meaning".

== Credits and personnel ==
- Scott Mescudi – vocals, production, songwriting, composition
- Oladipo Omishore – production, songwriting, composition
- Evan Mast – songwriting, composition
- Mike Stroud – songwriting, composition
- Iain Findlay – mixing engineering
- Joe LaPorta – master engineering

== Charts ==
Chart performance for "Love"
Chart (2022)	Peak position
New Zealand Hot Singles (RMNZ)	7
US Bubbling Under Hot 100 (Billboard)	1

== Release history ==
Release history and formats for "Love"
Region	Date	Format	Label
Various	March 3, 2015	SoundCloud	Self-released
Various	July 8, 2022	Digital download; streaming	Republic; Wicked Awesome
