= Moon Man's Landing =

American music festival

- Poster for Moon Man's Landing 2022
- Genre: Hip hop; alternative; indie
- Locations: West Bank Flats, Cleveland, Ohio
- Years active: 2022
- Founders: Kid Cudi
- Website: https://moonmanslanding.com/

Moon Man's Landing was an American music festival curated by musician and actor Kid Cudi, planned to be annual but only held in 2022.

== History ==
The first Moon Man's Landing event was initially held as a one-day music festival that took place on Saturday, September 17, 2022, as one of the tour dates for Cudi’s To the Moon World Tour. The event was held at the West Bank Flats in Cudi’s hometown of Cleveland, Ohio. The line-up for the festival included musicians such as Don Toliver, Playboi Carti, Haim, Bone Thugs-n-Harmony, Pusha T, Jaden and Chip tha Ripper, among others.

On June 2, 2023, Cudi announced he would return to Cleveland for the second annual festival. On June 14, Cudi unveiled the line-up for the second festival which included $uicideboy$, Bashfortheworld, Chelsea Pastel, Coi Leray, Siena Bella and Lil Uzi Vert. Cudi also revealed the location, confirming it would again take place in his hometown of Cleveland, on August 19, at Rocket Mortgage FieldHouse. On June 19, Cudi canceled the 2023 festival due to the city not approving it, but announced a planned return for 2024 hopefully with some of the same lineup performers in an outdoor venue.

However, as of June 2026, another edition of the festival has not been announced.

== Lineups ==
Date	Lineup
2022
September 17	Kid Cudi, Don Toliver, Playboi Carti, Haim, Bone Thugs-n-Harmony, Pusha T, Jaden, 070 Shake, Strick, Dominic Fike, Chip tha Ripper
2023 (canceled)
August 19	Kid Cudi, $uicideboy$, Bashfortheworld, Chelsea Pastel, Coi Leray, Siena Bella, Lil Uzi Vert
