= The Boy Who Flew to the Moon, Vol. 1 =

Greatest hits album by Kid Cudi
- Released: July 8, 2022
- Recorded: 2007–2020
- Genres: Hip hop; alternative hip hop; alternative rock; neo-psychedelia
- Length: 81:13
- Labels: Republic; Wicked Awesome

Kid Cudi chronology
Man on the Moon III: The Chosen (2020)	The Boy Who Flew to the Moon, Vol. 1 (2022)	Entergalactic (2022)

The Boy Who Flew to the Moon, Vol. 1 is the first greatest hits album by American musician Kid Cudi. It was released on July 8, 2022, by Republic Records and Cudi's Wicked Awesome imprint. The compilation includes tracks from seven of his previous studio albums: Man on the Moon: The End of Day (2009), Man on the Moon II: The Legend of Mr. Rager (2010), Indicud (2013), Satellite Flight: The Journey to Mother Moon (2014), Speedin' Bullet 2 Heaven (2015), Passion, Pain & Demon Slayin' (2016) and Man on the Moon III: The Chosen (2020). Also included are songs from his rock band, WZRD's eponymously titled debut album (2012). The album concludes with a re-mastered version of his 2015 non-album song "Love", as a bonus track. The Boy Who Flew to the Moon, Vol. 1 anthologizes songs by Cudi since his major-label debut, including those released during his joint deal with Kanye West's GOOD Music and major-label Republic.

== Background and promotion ==
Kid Cudi
(@KidCudi)
tweeted:

"This album is made for the fans new and old. If ur not too familiar, this is a perfect way to dip ur toe into the vibes. Welcome to all new fans!".

July 7, 2022

In June 2022, Cudi announced his first arena tour with To the Moon World Tour, set to begin in Vancouver on August 16, 2022, and conclude in Milan on November 22, 2022. On July 4, 2022, Kid Cudi took to Twitter to announce the release of his first "best-of" album, along with the re-issue of his debut mixtape A Kid Named Cudi on July 15 to digital streaming platforms (DSP). He revealed the compilation would be released on July 8. On July 5, Cudi unveiled the compilation's album cover, which features Cudi on a New York City rooftop wearing black Gucci x The North Face overalls. The following day, July 6, he revealed the track listing. Later that day he announced plans to release volume two of the collection at the end of 2022.

== Content ==
The Boy Who Flew to the Moon, Vol. 1 consists of 18 tracks spanning 14 years of music from Kid Cudi's career, including collaborative work with André 3000, Pharrell Williams, MGMT and other artists. Three tracks come from Man on the Moon III: The Chosen, the most to be featured from one album. "Day 'n' Nite", Cudi's breakout single represents the oldest material on the compilation, having originally been recorded in 2007 for his debut mixtape A Kid Named Cudi (2008). The second track on the compilation, "Pursuit of Happiness", appeared on Cudi's 2009 major-label debut album Man on the Moon: The End of Day. The compilation also features "The Dream Time Machine" and "Upper Room", album cuts taken from WZRD, the debut album of Cudi and Dot da Genius’ collective side project, alternative rock band WZRD. Also included are "Confused!" and "Speedin' Bullet 2 Heaven" the lead singles from Cudi’s punk rock/grunge-inspired fifth album Speedin' Bullet 2 Heaven. The song "Love", which appears as the bonus track, contains a sample of "Sunblocks" as performed by American electronic rock duo Ratatat and was originally recorded in 2013 during the Satellite Flight: The Journey to Mother Moon sessions, however had been officially unreleased due to sample clearance issues.

== Critical reception ==
Professional ratings
Review scores
Source	Rating
AllMusic	4.5/5 stars

Neil Yeung of AllMusic gave it a 4 and half out of 5, writing “packaged together, this compilation provides a fascinating peek into both Cudi's evolution and artistic scope, presenting a figure that maybe doesn't get enough credit for the creative leaps he's taken and the inspiration that he's provided to contemporaries and up-and-coming artists alike.”

== Track listing ==
The Boy Who Flew to the Moon, Vol. 1 track listing
No.	Title	Writer(s)	Producer(s)	Length
1.	"Day 'n' Nite (Nightmare)"	Scott Mescudi; Oladipo Omishore	Dot da Genius; Kid Cudi^{[a]}	3:41
2.	"Pursuit of Happiness (Nightmare)" (featuring MGMT and Ratatat)	Mescudi; Evan Mast; Mike Stroud	Ratatat	4:55
3.	"Ghost!"	Mescudi; Emile Haynie; Rusty Evans; V. Pike; T. Randazzo	Haynie	4:49
4.	"Mr. Rager"	Mescudi; Haynie	Haynie	4:54
5.	"The Dream Time Machine" (with WZRD)	Mescudi; Omishore	WZRD	4:47
6.	"Upper Room" (with WZRD)	Mescudi; Omishore	WZRD	3:12
7.	"Just What I Am" (featuring King Chip)	Mescudi; Charles Worth	Kid Cudi	3:48
8.	"Unfuckwittable"	Mescudi	Kid Cudi	4:35
9.	"Balmain Jeans" (featuring Raphael Saadiq)	Mescudi; Charles Wiggins	Kid Cudi	5:27
10.	"Too Bad I Have to Destroy You Now"	Mescudi; Omishore	Kid Cudi; Dot da Genius^{[a]}	6:17
11.	"Confused!"	Mescudi	Kid Cudi	3:56
12.	"Speedin' Bullet 2 Heaven"	Mescudi; Patrick Reynolds	Kid Cudi; Plain Pat^{[a]}	4:34
13.	"By Design" (featuring André 3000)	Mescudi; André Benjamin; Pharrell Williams; Reynolds	Williams; Plain Pat^{[a]}	4:17
14.	"Surfin'" (featuring Pharrell Williams)	Mescudi; Williams	Williams	6:15
15.	"Tequila Shots"	Mescudi; Omishore; David Biral; Denzel Baptiste	Dot da Genius; Take a Daytrip; Kid Cudi	3:13
16.	"Sad People"	Mescudi; Omishore; Biral; Baptiste	Dot da Genius; Take a Daytrip; Kid Cudi; Dennis Cummings	2:56
17.	"Sept. 16"	Mescudi; Omishore; Haynie; Reynolds; Finneas O'Connell	Dot da Genius; Haynie; Plain Pat; Kid Cudi; Cummings; Finneas^{[b]}	4:09
18.	"Love" (bonus track)	Mescudi; Omishore; Mast; Stroud	Kid Cudi; Dot da Genius^{[b]}	5:28
19.	"Maui Wowie" (added later on)	Mescudi; John Stephens; Kanye West	Kid Cudi; Plain Pat	2:23
Total length:				83:36

Notes

- ^{^[a]} signifies a co-producer
- ^{^[b]} signifies an additional producer

== Charts ==
Chart performance for The Boy Who Flew to the Moon, Vol. 1
Chart (2022)	Peak position
Canadian Albums (Billboard)	51
US Billboard 200	83
US Top R&B/Hip-Hop Albums (Billboard)	36

== Certifications ==
Certifications for "The Boy Who Flew To The Moon (Vol.1)"
Region	Certification	Certified units/sales
Brazil (Pro-Música Brasil)	Gold	20,000^{‡}
United Kingdom (BPI)	Silver	60,000^{‡}
^{‡} Sales+streaming figures based on certification alone.

== Personnel ==
Credits for The Boy Who Flew to the Moon, Vol. 1 adapted from AllMusic.

- Denzel Baptiste – composer
- André Benjamin – composer, primary artist
- David Biral – composer
- John Stephens – composer
- Peter Brown – composer
- John Bruce – composer
- King Chip – primary artist
- Thomas Cullison – recording
- Dennis Cummings – executive producer, producer
- Emile – producer
- Rusty Evans – composer
- Iain Findlay – mixing, recording
- Daniel Fornero – trumpet
- Chris Gehringer – mastering engineer
- Dot Da Genius – drums, executive producer, guitar (bass), keyboards, mixing, percussion, piano, producer, recording
- Noah Goldstein – mixing, recording
- Mick Guzauski – mixing
- Emile Haynie – composer, producer, recording
- Ken "Duro" Ifill – A&R
- Alex Iles – trombone
- Kid Cudi – drums, executive producer, guitar, keyboards, percussion, Primary Artist, Producer, Programmer, Programming
- Anthony Kilhoffer – mixing, recording
- Anthony Kronfle – recording
- Joe LaPorta – mastering engineer
- Mike Larson – recording
- Nick Littlemore – engineer
- Cesar Loza Assistant – engineer
- Erik Madrid – mixing assistant
- Manny Marroquin – mixing
- Evan Mast – composer, recording
- Jim McMillen – horn arrangements
- Vlado Meller – mastering engineer
- Scott Mescudi – composer, executive producer, producer
- MGMT – primary artist
- Christian Mochizuki – recording
- Mike Moore – drums, programming
- Finneas O'Connell – composer, producer
- Oladipo Omishore – composer, executive producer, producer, recording
- Brent Paschke – guitar (Electric)
- Victoria Pike – composer
- Plain Pat – producer
- Christian Plata – mixing assistant
- Teddy Randazzo - Composer
- Ratatat – Primary Artist, Producer
- Patrick Reynolds – composer, producer
- Raphael Saadiq – guitar, Primary Artist, Vocals (Background)
- Mark Santangelo – Mastering Engineer
- Robert Schaer – Trumpet
- Bradford Smith – mixing assistant
- Luke Steelen – engineer
- Mike Stroud – composer
- William J Sullivan – engineer
- Take a Daytrip – producer
- Doug Tornquist – Tuba
- Steve Trapani – Trombone (Bass)
- Mike Steven Velez – mixing engineer
- Ryan West – recording
- Charles Wiggins – composer
- Pharrell Williams – composer, Primary Artist, Producer
- Charles Worth – composer
- WZRD – Primary Artist, Producer

== Release history ==
Release history for The Boy Who Flew to the Moon, Vol. 1
Region	Date	Format	Label	Ref.
Various	July 8, 2022	Digital download; streaming	Wicked Awesome; Republic	
Various	TBA	CD; LP; cassette	Wicked Awesome; Republic	

== See also ==
- List of songs recorded by Kid Cudi
