= Cactus Plant Flea Market =

US clothing brand

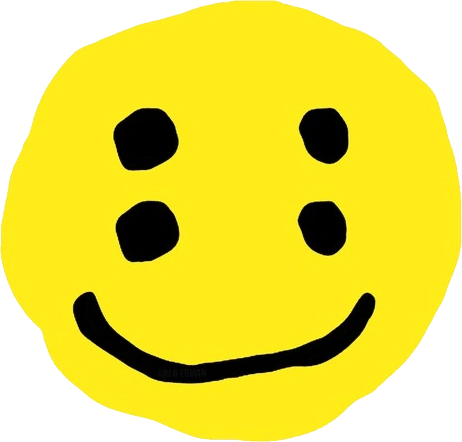

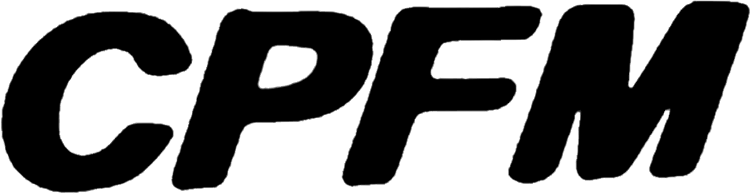
- Industry: Clothing industry
- Founded: 2014; 12 years ago
- Founder: Cynthia Lu
- Headquarters: New York City, U.S.
- Products: Clothing, shoes, accessories
- Website: cactusplantfleamarket.com

Cactus Plant Flea Market (CPFM) is an American design and fashion brand, known for depictions of faces with four eyes. Established by fashion designer Cynthia Lu in 2015, it has collaborated with Nike, Kid Cudi, and created toys for an adult-version of the McDonald's Happy Meal in 2022. Cynthia Lu started the brand inside of her apartment in Brooklyn, NY. Lu initially developed concepts for the brand in 2012, when she began a job with the P.R office of the apparel company "Billionaire Girls Club", which is owned by Pharrell Williams. The name of the brand could be a nod towards her nickname, which is Cactus or Plant.

== Collaborations ==
Cactus Plant Flea Market has created limited edition merchandise for Kid Cudi for his Man on the Moon III: The Chosen album, as well as for his collaboration with Kanye West, Kids See Ghosts.

In October 2022, the brand designed figurines of the McDonaldland characters for a McDonald's limited edition adult version of the Happy Meal entitled the Cactus Plant Flea Market box. The characters featured (Birdie, Grimace, the Hamburglar, and CPFM's Cactus Buddy) were given four eyes, as it is a common identifier of the brand, dubbed "double vision".

That same month, CPFM and Nike released the Flea 1 Overgrown Dunks, shoes intentionally designed with materials to feel mossy. Although initial opinions of the shoes were of shock and surprise, the model was still highly sought-after and sold out quickly. On October the following year, they released the Flea 2, a shoe with a detachable Nike "swoosh" and tire tread appearance.

On December 5, 2024, clothing brand Uniqlo announced a collaboration with CPFM to create a line of SpongeBob SquarePants themed shirts, hoodies and accessories for their UT sub-brand. The collab officially released on December 12, 2024.
