= Soundtrack 2 My Life =

Song by Kid Cudi

from the album Man on the Moon: The End of Day
- Released: September 15, 2009
- Recorded: 2009
- Genre: Alternative hip hop
- Length: 3:56
- Label: Dream On; GOOD; Universal Motown
- Songwriters: Matt Byrne; Emile Haynie; Scott Mescudi
- Producer: Haynie

"Soundtrack 2 My Life" is a song by American recording artist Kid Cudi, taken from his debut studio album Man on the Moon: The End of Day (2009). The lyrics were written by Cudi, while the music was written by American record producer Emile Haynie. The song's music video, directed by Jason Goldwatch, was released in 2010.

== Background ==
On February 19, 2009, Cudi made his national television debut when he appeared on BET's 106 & Park, alongside fellow American rapper Kanye West to debut the music video of "Day 'n' Nite". During the episode, Cudi rapped a verse, a cappella, which would ultimately become the first verse of "Soundtrack 2 My Life".

In a 2009 interview with DJBooth.net, Cudi explained his opening lines on the song: "I wrote that song from an ignorant standpoint, man – I wanted to have ignorance be the undertone of the whole song. And it really is to show what one thinks when his back is up against the wall. It's really to flip Jay's line and kind of use it in my favor. It worked – it's the only way I could've explained the situation."

== Music video ==
The video was directed by Cudi himself. It shows Cudi performing and various clips of Cudi being drunk and silly. The video was first posted to SoundCloud in 2008.

== Content ==
"Soundtrack 2 My Life" is the vibrant opening to Cudi's dreamland, as he raps about the work ethic of his mother, the death of his father, and the subsequent depression that came to consume him. It's a prelude of what's to come: the pain, the loss, the feelings of insignificance, and the boundless introspection. His lyrics on the track contain various musical and popular culture references, including those to the song "99 Problems", rapper Jay-Z, mentor Kanye West, the 80s sitcom Charles in Charge, the Pink Floyd album The Dark Side of the Moon, and the movie The Sixth Sense.

== Commercial performance ==
Upon the release of the featuring album, "Soundtrack 2 My Life" peaked at number five on the US Billboard Bubbling Under Hot 100. On March 13, 2019, the song was certified double platinum by the RIAA, for sales of over two million copies in the United States.

== In other media ==
The song was the theme song to MTV's World of Jenks.

== Charts ==
Chart (2009)	Peak position
US Bubbling Under Hot 100 (Billboard)	5

== Certifications ==
Region	Certification	Certified units/sales
United States (RIAA)	3× Platinum	3,000,000^{‡}
^{‡} Sales+streaming figures based on certification alone.
