= Show Out (Kid Cudi, Skepta and Pop Smoke song) =

Song by Kid Cudi, Skepta and Pop Smoke

from the album Man on the Moon III: The Chosen
- Released: December 11, 2020
- Genre: Drill
- Length: 2:54
- Label: Wicked Awesome; Republic
- Songwriters: Scott Mescudi; Joseph Adenuga; Bashar Jackson; Oladipo Omishore; Patrick Reynolds; Christopher Justice; Everett Romano
- Producers: Dot da Genius; Plain Pat; Gravez; Kid Cudi; Dennis Cummings; Heavy Mellow (co.)

"Show Out" is a song recorded by rappers Kid Cudi, Skepta and Pop Smoke. It was released on December 11, 2020, from Kid Cudi's seventh studio album Man on the Moon III: The Chosen. The song was produced by Dot da Genius, Plain Pat, Gravez, Cudi and Dennis Cummings, with co-production from Heavy Mellow.

== Background ==
In an interview with Zane Lowe, Kid Cudi spoke about how the collaboration on the song came about:

It was powerful because like I talked to Steven Victor about this and he said, when [Pop Smoke] first recorded this song, […] Steven had thought of me on it. The reason why I kind of got this record, Dot Da Genius and Plain Pat had worked with Pop, like before he blew up at the Brewery in New York, at Dot's studio. And they had this record, they just never did anything with it. It was just something that Dot had on tuck, you know?

And I was chilling with them one day because Dot's working on our album and he was like, "Yo, I got this record. I'm going to play it for you. Let me know what you think." He plays this shit. And I'm like, "I need this. Like I need this, man." I was like, "Nobody's ever heard me on anything like this. Skepta sounds amazing. Pop Smoke sounds amazing. Like this would be so unexpected. I think I can be on this and I could hold it down and like do my thing." And this is also another way I can, you know, showcase these bars.

In a January 2021 interview, Dot da Genius revealed the song was intended for an album of his own.

== Composition ==
"Show Out" is a drill song, featuring a "distortion-heavy instrumental and the relentless flows that Cudi zings back and forth" with Pop Smoke and Skepta.

== Critical reception ==
The song received generally mixed to positive reviews from critics. Wongo Okon of Uproxx wrote, "Despite it fitting right in Pop's lane, Cudi and Skepta get comfortable with ease on the song, proving for a satisfactory collaboration from the trio." Ellie Spina gave the song a "Very Hottttt" rating on HotNewHipHop and called it a "hard-hitting, hauntingly hyped up banger featuring not one, but two of rap's finest". Will Lavin of NME praised the song, writing, "Venturing into new territory, Cudi's drill excursion is more about letting off steam than it is about indulging toxic energy. He proclaims that he 'ain't no bitch', his bravado running rampant over the whirring baseline and menacing hi-hats, standing triumphant with a crew whom Skepta claims carry 'guns same size as Kevin Hart'."

Alphonse Pierre of Pitchfork gave a negative review of the song, specifically criticizing the manner Cudi shows his influence from rapper Travis Scott: "Pop Smoke's verse sounds as if it was never meant to be used, the drill-influenced beat is like when fast fashion steals runway designs, and Cudi's spirituality is shallow." In a Rolling Stone review of Man on the Moon III, Danny Schwartz considered it the worst song from the album and wrote that the song "attempts to graft Scott's style onto contemporary drill a la 'GATTI,' except with a knock-off 808Melo beat."

== Charts ==
Chart (2020)	Peak position
Canada Hot 100 (Billboard)	42
France (SNEP)	78
Global 200 (Billboard)	41
Ireland (IRMA)	29
New Zealand Hot Singles (RMNZ)	5
Portugal (AFP)	95
Switzerland (Schweizer Hitparade)	43
UK Singles (OCC)	37
US Billboard Hot 100	54
US Hot R&B/Hip-Hop Songs (Billboard)	12

== Certifications ==
Certifications for "Show Out"
Region	Certification	Certified units/sales
New Zealand (RMNZ)	Gold	15,000^{‡}
^{‡} Sales+streaming figures based on certification alone.
