= Man on the Moon III: The Chosen =

Studio album by Kid Cudi
- Released: December 11, 2020
- Recorded: 2020
- Studios: EastWest, Los Angeles, California
- Genres: Hip-hop; cloud rap; psychedelia; pop rap; trap
- Length: 58:24
- Labels: Wicked Awesome; Republic
- Producers: 18YOMAN; Aaron Bow; Anthony Kilhoffer; Charlie Handsome; Dennis Cummings; Dot da Genius; DST the Danger; E*vax; Emile Haynie; Finneas; FnZ; Gravez; J Gramm; Kid Cudi; Mike Dean; Nosaj Thing; Plain Pat; Ramii; Take a Daytrip; Teddy Walton; William Sullivan; WondaGurl

Kid Cudi chronology
Kids See Ghosts (2018)	Man on the Moon III: The Chosen (2020)	The Boy Who Flew to the Moon, Vol. 1 (2022)

Man on the Moon III: The Chosen is the seventh studio album by American musician Kid Cudi, released on December 11, 2020, by Wicked Awesome Records and Republic Records. It is the final installment of Cudi's Man on the Moon trilogy of albums (which includes 2009's Man on the Moon: The End of Day and 2010's Man on the Moon II: The Legend of Mr. Rager).

The 18-track album was produced mainly by Cudi himself and Dot da Genius, along with Plain Pat, Emile Haynie and Mike Dean, all of whom contributed to the previous two Man on the Moon albums. Guest vocals on the album are contributed by Phoebe Bridgers, Pop Smoke, Skepta and Trippie Redd.

Thematically, Man on the Moon III is a concept album that finds Cudi in an internal struggle against his evil alter ego, Mr. Rager, in hopes to win back his peace and happiness. As with the previous two installments in the trilogy, the album is divided into separate acts.

Man on the Moon III: The Chosen received mostly positive reviews from music critics, who praised Cudi's songwriting and generally favored the latter two acts, though some found it derivative of Cudi's earlier albums. It debuted at number two on the Billboard 200, earning 144,000 album-equivalent units of which 15,000 were pure sales, marking Cudi's fifth top 10 album in the US.

== Background and conception ==
Kid Cudi released the first edition of his Man on the Moon series in 2009; with the subtitle The End of Day, the album detailed the struggles of Cudi's loneliness in his formative years, as well as dealing with the death of his father at an early age. The album, which included the worldwide hit single "Day 'n' Nite", was divided into five acts and featured narration from Cudi's then-GOOD Music label-mate and fellow American rapper Common. The next year he released the sequel, the follow-up to his critically acclaimed seminal debut; with the subtitle The Legend of Mr. Rager, Cudi took an even darker approach, creating an alter ego by the name of Mr. Rager and chronicling how his initial sudden and unexpected rise to fame drove him to alcohol and drugs.

In 2014, Cudi released Satellite Flight: The Journey to Mother Moon, which he called a prelude to Man on the Moon III. In 2015, following the release of Speedin' Bullet 2 Heaven, which had lukewarm reception much to Cudi's dismay, Cudi took to Twitter to address the response "News Flash: motm3 doesn't exist. Its just a title. It will be nothing like any of my previous work just like all my releases. My first 2 albums were meant to be untopped. I didn't even think Id live to make another record after motm 2... My point is, u cant top timeless. And that was what we aim for everytime."

However, in a 2016 interview with Billboard, Cudi announced Man on the Moon III would never exist: "Guys, you have to realize: I came up with Man on the Moon when I was a young man. People change their vibe! We can follow the same template and do the five-act split. Sonically, I'm still going to be where I'm at. Honestly, I was ready to live up to the obligation and do Man on the Moon III. I haven't been dicking around. I was planning on doing it after Speedin' Bullet. But the Speedin' Bullet response tore me up. It made me realize what's most important. I'm getting back on the bike again and doing what I do best: me."

Kid Cudi
(@KidCudi)
tweeted:

"MOTM3 was inspired by my life. As all my other albums. The sound of the album is my own fusion of everything Ive done thus far and some new ideas. I sound like no one else. When u hear a Cudi record, u know."

July 3, 2021

In 2016, Cudi reunited with Emile Haynie and Plain Pat, both of whom are former business partners of Cudi and helped formulate his signature sound, to produce Passion, Pain & Demon Slayin', which followed the same format as the Man on the Moon projects. The significance in the release is it marks the first time all three had collaborated since Man on the Moon II (2010) and the disestablishment of their record label, Dream On. In December 2022, Cudi would later reveal Passion, Pain & Demon Slayin' was originally going to be released as Man on the Moon III, but opted not to because he wanted to "be in a better place" when he ultimately released the final installment of his trilogy.

In a December 2020 interview with Zane Lowe for Apple Music, Cudi detailed how he went from working on Entergalactic (his Netflix-series soundtrack album) and The Scotts (his collaborative single with Houston-based rapper Travis Scott), to ultimately working on the final installment of his trilogy.

== Recording and production ==
Kid Cudi
(@KidCudi)
tweeted:

"I can't/won't make MOTM3 w/o Pat, Emile & A Trak in the studio. We started together, we finish this together. It's time I assemble the team".
"We all had a vision we shared for this story. I can't create the magic yall want with out their energy and genius to bounce off of".

January 20, 2015

The album features production from Cudi's longtime collaborators Dot da Genius, Emile Haynie, Plain Pat and Mike Dean, all of whom helped shape the sound for the first two installments of the Man on the Moon series. Added to Cudi's team of producers was up-and-coming production duo Take a Daytrip, whose production is featured prominently throughout the album; the duo had previously produced Cudi's first number one single on the US Billboard Hot 100 chart, "The Scotts", alongside Dot da Genius.

After achieving his first number one single in the US with "The Scotts", Cudi celebrated with the song's producers, Dot da Genius and Take a Daytrip. While celebrating and drinking shots of tequila, they began recording a song ultimately titled "Tequila Shots". Cudi subsequently went on to record two more songs with the producers, namely "Another Day" and "She Knows This", which went on to lay the foundation for Man on the Moon III. Cudi explained to Apple Music that he had been in a good place working on his animated series Entergalactic and on The Scotts, but he kept coming up with cuts that didn't fit either of those projects. After those three songs, he was saying to himself, "Whoa, this shit really feels like a Man on the Moon. It sounds like you pick right back up where we left off 10 years ago."

Kid Cudi
(@KidCudi)
tweeted:

"Just wanna clear this up. If anyone inspired me w this album it was myself. I mentioned Trav cuz that was a moment for me that meant something. If anyone really pushed me to rap on this album it would be Dot, my girl Rocky, Dennis, my engineer Bill, my sister Maisha n Chip."

December 9, 2020

In an interview for Apple Music, Cudi explained that he was encouraged by his protégé, Houston-based rapper Travis Scott to be more lyrical and made a concerted effort to showcase his skill set as a rapper on this album, since he feels he is overlooked in that aspect of his artistry. In a January 2021 interview with Complex, Dot da Genius spoke on the creation of several tracks on the album: "'Solo Dolo III' was a beat me and Plain Pat did initially during the Entergalactic sessions that Cudi never recorded to. But he was inspired to during the Man on the Moon III sessions."

Kid Cudi
(@KidCudi)
tweeted:

"I recorded all of motm 3 at my house."

May 8, 2021

When speaking on the song "Show Out", his collaboration with the posthumous Brooklyn rapper Pop Smoke and London-based rapper Skepta, Cudi said "It was powerful because like I talked to Steven Victor (Pop Smoke's manager) about this and he said, when [Pop Smoke] first recorded this song, he had thought of me on it. Steven had thought of me on it. The reason why I kind of got this record, Dot da Genius and Plain Pat had worked with Pop, like before he blew up at the Brewery in New York, at Dot's studio. And they had this record, they just never did anything with it. It was just something that Dot had on tuck, you know?" Cudi went on to reveal that once Dot da Genius played him the record, he was compelled by it: "And I was chilling with them one day because Dot's working on our album and he was like, 'Yo, I got this record. I'm going to play it for you. Let me know what you think'. He plays this shit. And I'm like, 'I need this. Like I need this, man'. I was like, 'Nobody's ever heard me on anything like this. Skepta sounds amazing. Pop Smoke sounds amazing. Like this would be so unexpected. I think I can be on this and I could hold it down and like do my thing'. And this is also another way I can, you know, showcase these bars." Dot da Genius later revealed the song was originally intended for his own album.

Cudi also revealed for this album, he decided to incorporate ad-libs, but was hesitant to do it in the traditional way. "I decided to sprinkle in some ad-libs, something I've never really done before," he explains. "I was able to do it in my own little way, so it remains authentic and doesn't sound like I'm doing ad-libs like everybody else." In 2021, Cudi appeared on American TV talk show The Shop, where he spoke on his writing and recording process. Cudi mentioned for his early albums he would sit down and write entire verses. However, while working on Man on the Moon III, he adopted Kanye West's writing process. Instead of writing to a beat, he records a reference track for himself, where he freestyles and hums his way through the beat to get a melody, and fills in the lyrics as they come to him.

== Music and lyrics ==
"Beautiful Trip", the album's intro, comprises instrumentation, backing vocals, and a sample of a voice counting down: "3,2,1." It interpolates sounds from "In My Dreams", the first track on Man on the Moon: The End of Day. The synths at the beginning are also the same as those on "Scott Mescudi vs. the World", the opening song of Man on the Moon II: The Legend of Mr. Rager. On the second album cut, "Tequila Shots", Cudi lays out his inner demons and mental health journey. Charles Holmes of The Ringer wrote "["Tequila Shots"] sounds like a surge of cosmic energy. The tempo is fast, the drums are intense, and the song doesn't relent [...] with rhymes about 'demons creepin'' and 'serenity,' but 'Tequila Shots' refuses to be anything besides a banger." Holmes also wrote "songs like 'Another Day' and 'She Knows This,' Cudi layers his verses with ad-libs, and his vocals sound more distorted and robotic than ever." "Show Out" is a drill song, featuring a "distortion-heavy instrumental and the relentless flows that Cudi zings back and forth" with Pop Smoke and Skepta.

== Artwork ==
In the last 10 years, Scott Mescudi has been through hell and back. After feeling like his world was over, he found hope and overcame the darkness that was plaguing his life. But happiness isn't forever. What he thought was peace turns into a nightmare. He finds himself lost dealing with the same pain he had not felt in years. In one night, he must face himself again and fight to win back his soul from the evil Mr. Rager.

— the synopsis on the album's back cover.

The cover art depicts Cudi staring directly at the listener, in contrast to the artwork of the previous installments in the trilogy, which feature Cudi looking downwards; the right side of Cudi's face is composed of a "psychedelic/prismatic explosion of bones and sinew", with a moon and a falling moon man obscuring his eye. It was designed by illustrator Sam Spratt, who was hired due to Cudi liking his artwork for Logic's album No Pressure. Spratt stated that the artwork was meant to capture Cudi's feelings, while still being "something that would stand out in a Spotify gallery and steer the algorithm", calling it a "glorified piece of marketing".

== Release and promotion ==
The continuation of Kid Cudi's Man on the Moon trilogy was first teased in his July 2020 collaboration with fellow American rapper Eminem, "The Adventures of Moon Man & Slim Shady", in which Cudi raps on the outro, "The trilogy continues". Cudi officially confirmed Man on the Moon III in October 2020, releasing a trailer with the caption, "The trilogy continues... soon". In November, he tweeted, "The music is coming. I promise". On December 7, 2020, he released a cinematic trailer, revealing the title, release date, tracklist, and the cover art, designed by Sam Spratt.

The songs "She Knows This" and "Heaven on Earth" were released as promotional singles, with accompanying two part music videos. The music video for "Heaven on Earth" picks up where the video for "She Knows This" left off. Both videos were filmed cinematically and were directed by high-profile music video director Nabil Elderkin. The videos were a part of YouTube Music's Artist Spotlight series.

Just hours before releasing the long-awaited album, Cudi rolled out a small batch of merchandise in support of the album. The range was made in collaboration with Cactus Plant Flea Market, and consists of short- and long-sleeve T-shirts, pullover hoodies, and sweatpants—all of which feature graphics that reference MOTM3 tracks. On December 20, 2020, Cudi revealed he would be releasing a deluxe edition of the album, dubbed The Cudder Cut. However, in May 2021, Cudi opted not to issue a deluxe edition of the album, in order to focus on new material.

In April 2021, Kid Cudi was the sole musical guest on Saturday Night Live, where he performed Man on the Moon III album cuts "Tequila Shots" and "Sad People"; both performances were in tribute to Nirvana's late frontman Kurt Cobain. His performance of "Sad People", made headlines as Cudi wore a dress as a statement against social norms much like his idol Cobain had done.

In June 2021, Kid Cudi partnered with Amazon, to perform on their Prime Day Show event, which included three new alternate versions of songs from the album, namely "Tequila Shots", "Sad People" and "4 Da Kidz". The alternate versions of the songs were included on an extended play (EP) titled Prime Day Show x Kid Cudi, issued exclusively on Amazon Music, on June 17, 2021.

On September 25, 2021, Cudi revealed he was preparing for an upcoming concert tour in promotion for Man on the Moon III, when he wrote on Twitter that he's "been bookin venues for months." Cudi ultimately announced his first arena tour in June 2022, with To the Moon World Tour, set to begin in Vancouver on August 16, 2022, and conclude in Milan on November 22, 2022.

== Critical reception ==
Man on the Moon III: The Chosen ratings
Aggregate scores
Source	Rating
AnyDecentMusic?	6.9/10
Metacritic	71/100
Review scores
Source	Rating
AllMusic	3.5/5 stars
Clash	9/10
Consequence	B+
Exclaim!	8/10
The Line of Best Fit	8/10
Loud and Quiet	6/10
NME	4/5 stars
Pitchfork	4.9/10
Rolling Stone	2.5/5 stars
Sputnikmusic	3.6/5

Man on the Moon III: The Chosen was met with generally positive reviews. At Metacritic, which assigns a normalized rating out of 100 to reviews from professional publications, the album received an average score of 71, based on 10 reviews, indicating "generally favorable reviews". Aggregator AnyDecentMusic? gave it 6.9 out of 10, based on their assessment of the critical consensus.

Critics have generally found the first half of the album to be weaker. Riley Wallace of Exclaim! stated, "Cudi sparkles in the first two acts. ... While satisfying, the most endearing and powerful standout moments appear in the third and fourth acts". For The Line of Best Fit, Luke Ballance complimented the guest appearances and the album's progression beyond Act II, concluding: "While it might take a few listens to make sense of the album's seemingly muddled introduction, one thing is clear: by the end of this hour-long journey, Cudi has reached his destination." Skye Butchard of Loud and Quiet wrote that "Cudi finds his feet again on the back half of the project, allowing himself to wander into trippy and introspective songwriting". Some were also dismissive of the album's concept; Butchart found it to be "flimsy, there to give greater a sense of weight to what are largely formulaic pop rap songs", and Alphonse Pierre of Pitchfork opined it was placed to "make the album seem more important". For Danny Schwartz of Rolling Stone, it has a more "half-baked" narrative compared to Man on the Moon II, which he said to contribute to the album's "faux-epic scope".

In a positive review, Mason Meyers of Clash dubbed Man on the Moon III: The Chosen as Cudi's "best solo album to date", praising the production and modern influences. Writing for Variety, A. D. Amorosi praised the album, stating that "The album generally finds his deep-breathing, sing-song-y baritone nestled almost exclusively in ambient synth-hop. Ultimately, this nearly single-sourced sound is more consistent, and easier on the ears. ... But it's when Cudi is by himself – lonely and punching through the darkness – that his somnolent, bittersweet reveries are at their tastiest". Will Lavin of NME said, "Kid Cudi gives us every part of himself, laying out his insecurities and inner demons in the hope that it might help someone else, his words etched into a vivid backdrop of intoxicating melodies and palatial riffs. No one does mood music quite like Cudi". Rowan5215 from Sputnikmusic enjoyed the album, saying, "This is a fun, sometimes moving project, extremely consistent and concise by the standards we apply to Kid Cudi since around 2013". Fred Thomas of AllMusic wrote, "Man on the Moon, Vol 3: The Chosen represents both a return to form for Cudi as much as a distillation of his most successful experiments with genre and delivery".

Some critics found the album to be unoriginal. Danny Schwartz of Rolling Stone stated, "We've seen it all before. Kid Cudi's ability to be an avatar for people's struggles with mental illness has always been central to his appeal. His music might still be relatable, but it has never sounded so cliché". Writing for Pitchfork, Alphonse Pierre found the album underwhelming, and commented that its second half is too reminiscent of Cudi's past works, naming his "lifeless hums" and "half-assed singing" as clichés. He wrote that "[Cudi's] stories about how struggles with depression and loneliness affected his relationships were detailed enough to be personal but also vague enough to be easily applied to anyone's life. That's not the reality anymore, and Cudi doesn't appear to realize it".

== Commercial performance ==
Man on the Moon III: The Chosen debuted at number two on the US Billboard 200 with 144,000 album-equivalent units (including 15,000 pure album sales) in its first week. This became Cudi's fifth top 10 album. The album also accumulated a total of 167.45 million on-demand streams of the set's songs in the week ending December 17, 2020.

With 18 simultaneous placements on the Hot R&B/Hip-Hop Songs chart, Cudi became the fifth artist to post at least that many entries on the chart in a single week. His company includes Drake, who has claimed 10 separate weeks with 18-plus entries, Lil Uzi Vert and the Weeknd, each with two such weeks, and Lil Wayne and Pop Smoke, who have managed the feat once apiece.

The album also produced nine chart entries on the Billboard Hot 100 chart of December 26, 2020 with "Tequila Shots" the highest entry at number 41, as well as the intro "Beautiful Trip" at number 100. At 37 seconds long, "Beautiful Trip" is a shorter Hot 100 track than the 45-second long "PPAP (Pen-Pineapple-Apple-Pen)" by Japanese comedian Pikotaro. It was the Guinness World Records holder for the shortest song to chart in the history of the Hot 100, until an even shorter 34-second "Steve's Lava Chicken" by Jack Black charted in 2025.

In December 2021, Man on the Moon III: The Chosen broke the record for the biggest vinyl sales week for both a male artist and a rap album in Nielsen history, with 41,500 in vinyl units sold.

== Track listing ==
Act I: Return 2 Madness
No.	Title	Writer(s)	Producer(s)	Length
1.	"Beautiful Trip"	Scott Mescudi; Emile Haynie; Oladipo Omishore; Patrick Reynolds; Finneas O'Connell	Kid Cudi; Haynie; Dot da Genius; Plain Pat; Finneas; Dennis Cummings	0:37
2.	"Tequila Shots"	Mescudi; Omishore; David Biral; Denzel Baptiste	Dot da Genius; Take a Daytrip; Kid Cudi	3:13
3.	"Another Day"	Mescudi; Omishore; Jason Chung; Biral; Baptiste	Dot da Genius; Take a Daytrip; Nosaj Thing; Kid Cudi; Cummings	3:19
4.	"She Knows This"	Mescudi; Omishore; Julian Gramma; Michael Mule; Isaac de Boni	Dot da Genius; J Gramm; FnZ; Kid Cudi; Cummings	3:36
5.	"Dive"	Mescudi; Anthony Kilhoffer; Travis Walton; Aaron Booe; Kevin Parker^{[d]}	Kilhoffer; Teddy Walton; Aaron Bow; Dot da Genius; Kid Cudi; Cummings	2:28

Act II: The Rager, The Menace
No.	Title	Writer(s)	Producer(s)	Length
6.	"Damaged"	Mescudi; Omishore; Biral; Baptiste; Michael Dean	Dot da Genius; Take a Daytrip; Mike Dean; Kid Cudi; Cummings	2:30
7.	"Heaven on Earth"	Mescudi; Kilhoffer; Destin Omambo	Kilhoffer; DST the Danger; Dot da Genius; Kid Cudi; Cummings	3:21
8.	"Show Out" (with Skepta and Pop Smoke)	Mescudi; Joseph Adenuga; Bashar Jackson; Omishore; Reynolds; Christopher Justice; Everett Romano	Dot da Genius; Plain Pat; Gravez; Kid Cudi; Cummings; Heavy Mellow^{[a]}	2:54
9.	"Solo Dolo, Pt. III"	Mescudi; Omishore; Reynolds; Nicholas Britell^{[e]}; Rafeal Brown	Kid Cudi; Dot da Genius; Plain Pat; Cummings; Audio Anthem^{[c]}	4:02

Act III: Heart of Rose Gold
No.	Title	Writer(s)	Producer(s)	Length
10.	"Sad People"	Mescudi; Omishore; Biral; Baptiste	Dot da Genius; Take a Daytrip; Kid Cudi; Cummings	2:56
11.	"Elsie's Baby Boy (Flashback)"	Mescudi; Evan Mast; Omishore; Romano; Alan Price^{[f]}	Kid Cudi; E*vax; Cummings; Dot da Genius^{[b]}; Heavy Mellow^{[b]}	3:39
12.	"Sept. 16"	Mescudi; Omishore; Haynie; Reynolds; O'Connell	Dot da Genius; Haynie; Plain Pat; Kid Cudi; Cummings; Finneas^{[b]}	4:09
13.	"The Void"	Mescudi; Dean	Kid Cudi; Dot da Genius; Cummings; Mike Dean^{[a]}	5:25
14.	"Lovin' Me" (featuring Phoebe Bridgers)	Mescudi; Phoebe Bridgers; Ryan Vojtesak; Omishore; William Sullivan; Rami Eadeh	Charlie Handsome; Dot da Genius; Sullivan; Ramii; Kid Cudi; Cummings	2:45

Act IV: Powers
No.	Title	Writer(s)	Producer(s)	Length
15.	"The Pale Moonlight"	Mescudi; Omishore; Eadeh; Mast	E*vax; Dot da Genius; Ramii; Kid Cudi; Cummings	2:56
16.	"Rockstar Knights" (with Trippie Redd)	Mescudi; Michael White II; Omishore; Ebony Oshunrinde; Biral; Baptiste; Julius Alexander-Brown; Dean	Dot da Genius; WondaGurl; Take a Daytrip; Kid Cudi; Cummings; Mike Dean^{[a]}; Jenius^{[c]}	3:51
17.	"4 Da Kidz"	Mescudi; Omishore; Biral; Baptiste; Oshunrinde; Dean	Dot da Genius; WondaGurl; Take a Daytrip; Kid Cudi; Cummings; Mike Dean^{[a]}; Len20^{[b]}; 18YOMAN^{[b]}	3:04
18.	"Lord I Know"	Mescudi; Omishore; Biral; Baptiste; Vincent Goodyer; Dean	Dot da Genius; Take a Daytrip; 18YOMAN; Kid Cudi; Cummings; Mike Dean^{[a]}; Len20^{[b]}	3:32
Total length:				58:24

Notes

- ^{^[a]} signifies a co-producer
- ^{^[b]} signifies an additional producer
- ^{^[c]} signifies an uncredited co-producer

Sample credits

- "She Knows This" contains an audio clip from the film Scott Pilgrim vs. the World (2010).
- ^{^[d]} "Dive" contains a sample of "Love/Paranoia", written by Kevin Parker, and performed by Tame Impala.
- ^{^[e]} "Solo Dolo, Pt. III" contains a portion of "Tetrachord – War and Fate", written by Nicholas Britell, from the film The King (2019).
- ^{^[f]} "Elsie's Baby Boy (Flashback)" contains an interpolation of "The House of the Rising Sun", written by Alan Price.
- "The Void" contains a sample of "Time", written by Mauricio Rebolledo and Aksel Schaufler, performed by The Panchanga Boys.
- "4 Da Kidz" contains footage from the film Cast Away (2000).

== Personnel ==
Credits adapted from the album's liner notes, Tidal and Pitchfork.

Musicians

- Kid Cudi – vocals
- William J. Sullivan – programming (track 4)
- Mike Dean – keyboards (tracks 6, 13, and 16–18), synthesizer (tracks 6, 13, and 16–18)
- Skepta – vocals (track 8)
- Pop Smoke – vocals (track 8)
- Phoebe Bridgers – vocals (track 14)
- Trippie Redd – vocals (track 16)

Technical

- Joe LaPorta – mastering
- Manny Marroquin – mixing (all tracks), immersive mixing (track 15)
- Chris Galland – mixing (tracks 9, 14, and 15)
- Jeremie Inhaber – mixing (tracks 9, 14, and 15), immersive mixing (track 9)
- Zach Pereyra – mixing (tracks 9, 14, and 15)
- Chris Kahn – recording assistance (track 9)
- William J. Sullivan – engineering (all tracks), programming (track 4)
- Joshua Faulkner – engineering (track 8)
- Max McAllister – engineering (track 8)
- Parker – engineering (track 8)
- Iain Findlay – engineering (tracks 11 and 13)
- Dot da Genius – engineering (tracks 15 and 16)
- Igor Mamet – engineering (track 16)

== Charts ==
=== Weekly charts ===
Weekly chart performance of Man on the Moon III: The Chosen
Chart (2020)	Peak position
Australian Albums (ARIA)	25
Austrian Albums (Ö3 Austria)	43
Belgian Albums (Ultratop Flanders)	23
Belgian Albums (Ultratop Wallonia)	37
Canadian Albums (Billboard)	2
Danish Albums (Hitlisten)	6
Dutch Albums (Album Top 100)	14
Finnish Albums (Suomen virallinen lista)	24
French Albums (SNEP)	42
Irish Albums (Official Charts)	17
Italian Albums (FIMI)	57
New Zealand Albums (RMNZ)	7
Norwegian Albums (VG-lista)	6
Swedish Albums (Sverigetopplistan)	23
Swiss Albums (Schweizer Hitparade)	18
UK Albums (Official Charts)	26
UK R&B Albums (Official Charts)	22
US Billboard 200	2
US Top R&B/Hip-Hop Albums (Billboard)	1

=== Year-end charts ===
Year-end chart performance for Man on the Moon III: The Chosen
Chart (2021)	Position
US Billboard 200	123
US Top R&B/Hip-Hop Albums (Billboard)	54

== Release history ==
Release dates and formats for Man on the Moon III: The Chosen
Region	Date	Label(s)	Format(s)	Ref
Various	December 11, 2020	Wicked Awesome; Republic	Digital download; streaming	
Various	June 18, 2021	Wicked Awesome; Republic	CD	
Various	December 17, 2021	Wicked Awesome; Republic	LP	
