= Through the Late Night =

Song by Travis Scott featuring Kid Cudi

Song by Travis Scott featuring Kid Cudi

from the album Birds in the Trap Sing McKnight
- Released: September 2, 2016
- Recorded: 2016
- Studio: Record Plant (Los Angeles)
- Genre: Hip hop; trap
- Length: 4:46
- Label: Grand Hustle; Epic
- Songwriters: Jacques Webster II; Scott Mescudi; Oladipo Omishore; Ronald LaTour; Kevin Gomringer; Tim Gomringer
- Producers: Cardo; Cubeatz

"Through the Late Night" (stylized in all lowercase) is a song by American rapper Travis Scott featuring fellow American rapper Kid Cudi. The first of several collaborations between the two rappers, it was released on September 2, 2016, as a track from the scott's second studio album Birds in the Trap Sing McKnight.

== Composition ==
The song features humming in the chorus from Kid Cudi, who sings the refrain, "Sleep through day, then we play all through the late night". It finds the rappers singing about partying late at night, with references to drugs, namely lysergic acid diethylamide. Travis Scott also interpolates Cudi's "Day 'n' Nite" in his verse.

== Critical reception ==
The song was met with generally favorable reviews. Kid Cudi's humming was particularly praised; Preezy Brown of XXL added that his "lyrical ability is on display here" as well. Critics commented that Travis Scott had unclear lyrics in the song. However, regarding one of Scott's lines, Matthew Strauss of Pitchfork wrote that "Because he does not provide great detail or context as to why he's in dire need of salvation, it comes off as both grandiose and vacuous, which, at best, is just really fun to listen to."

== Charts ==
Chart (2016)	Peak position
US Bubbling Under Hot 100 (Billboard)	7
US Hot R&B/Hip-Hop Songs (Billboard)	43

== Certifications ==
Region	Certification	Certified units/sales
Australia (ARIA)	Gold	35,000^{‡}
Canada (Music Canada)	Platinum	80,000^{‡}
New Zealand (RMNZ)	Gold	15,000^{‡}
United States (RIAA)	2× Platinum	2,000,000^{‡}
^{‡} Sales+streaming figures based on certification alone.
