= Pursuit of Happiness (song) =

2009 single by Kid Cudi

"Pursuit of Happiness (Nightmare)"

Single by Kid Cudi featuring MGMT and Ratatat

from the album Man on the Moon: The End of Day
- Released: January 25, 2010
- Recorded: 2009
- Genre: Neo-psychedelia; alternative hip hop; pop-rap; psychedelic pop; electronic rock; rap rock
- Length: 4:55 (album version); 4:03 (radio edit); 6:13 (Steve Aoki Remix); 6:20 (acoustic version)
- Label: Dream On; GOOD; Universal Motown
- Songwriters: Scott Mescudi; Evan Mast; Mike Stroud
- Producer: Ratatat

Kid Cudi singles chronology
"Make Her Say" (2009)	"Pursuit of Happiness (Nightmare)" (2010)	"Memories" (2010)

MGMT singles chronology
"Kids" (2009)	"Pursuit of Happiness" (2010)	"Flash Delirium" (2010)

Ratatat singles chronology
"Mirando" (2009)	"Pursuit of Happiness" (2010)	"Party with Children" (2010)

Music video
- Slow party version on YouTube

Music video
- Megaforce version on YouTube

Audio sample
- "Pursuit of Happiness": file; help

"Pursuit of Happiness" is a song by American musician Kid Cudi, respectively featuring production and vocals from American electronic rock duo Ratatat and American neo-psychedelic act MGMT. The song was officially released on September 15, 2009, as the third single from Cudi's debut album, Man on the Moon: The End of Day (2009).

The meaning of the song is often misconstrued with being about the positive side of a carefree lifestyle, when in reality it tells a dark tale of drinking and driving as well as the regret and pain associated with drug abuse and how it leads to escapism.

The song was certified diamond by the Recording Industry Association of America (RIAA) in December 2022 for reaching 10 million sales in the United States.

== Background and release ==
On the album, the track is titled "Pursuit of Happiness (Nightmare)", following the album's dream sequence. The final version of the song was premiered on September 4, 2009, on the DJ Semtex BBC Radio 1 show.

In 2021, Kid Cudi released an acoustic version of the song, which originally premiered on Amazon’s Prime Day Show. The song was included on an extended play (EP) titled Prime Day Show x Kid Cudi, issued exclusively on Amazon Music, on June 17, 2021.

The original song was later included on Cudi’s first greatest hits album The Boy Who Flew to the Moon, Vol. 1 (2022).

== Music and lyrics ==
Luke Hinz of HotNewHipHop wrote "'Pursuit of Happiness' is a melancholic return to self-examination from the perspective of an addict looking for their next hit. The happiness of the track is fleeting, confined within the limits of each high; it's a glimpse into a search that seemingly will never come to an end. Cudi understands that the happiness of each addiction is only temporary and ultimately unsatisfactory, yet he can't manage to break free of the cycle that always seems to end in failure."

== Steve Aoki remix ==
Upon the song's release, American electro house DJ Steve Aoki, produced a remix of "Pursuit of Happiness", which went on to become as popular as the original and became a staple at Aoki's concerts. Steve Aoki released his remix on December 5, 2009. In 2012, the remix was heavily featured in the trailers for the comedy film Project X and was later included on the film's soundtrack. On May 1, 2012, an "Extended Steve Aoki Remix" was released via digital distribution, such as iTunes and Amazon.com. Also in May 2012, Kid Cudi received a nomination for Best Song from a Movie at the MTV Movie Awards, for the Steve Aoki remix to "Pursuit of Happiness", being used in Project X.

== Reception ==
Emma Silvers of SF Weekly called the song a "self-aware 2009 party anthem—or chronicle of a person's thinking as they veer into a drunk and drugged out downward spiral, depending on how you spin it—is a pretty lonely song to begin with."

== Chart performance ==
"Pursuit of Happiness" debuted and peaked on the Billboard Hot 100 at number 59 on the week ending October 3, 2009. The following week, it fell 41 spots to number 100. The song re-entered at number 95 on the week ending January 8, 2011. As of March 2013, it sold over 2,000,000 downloads since its release. The song originally peaked at number 137 on the UK Singles Chart, but it re-entered the chart in 2012 attaining a new peak of 72 and entered for the first time on the Irish Singles Chart, peaking at 24. In 2012, it has also charted for the first time in Austria, Belgium (Wallonia), France, Germany, Netherlands, Sweden and Switzerland.

== Music videos ==
The first music video released, directed by Brody Baker and produced by Josh Hartnett, displays Kid Cudi at a party. While everyone is having a good time, the whole party goes into a slow-motion state. Ratatat does not appear in the video, however MGMT member Ben Goldwasser does make an appearance. Other cameo appearances include Cudi's then GOOD Music label-mate Consequence, actor Jake Hoffman along with fellow rappers Johnny Polygon and Drake.

The second music video released, directed by Megaforce, shows Kid Cudi waking up and interacting with a swiveling couch, and a party scene. The members of Ratatat are featured.

== Covers and influence ==
In February 2010, Los Angeles–based electro-pop folk trio Barbara, released a cover version of the song. In early 2010, Australian alternative rock band Cloud Control, covered "Pursuit of Happiness", on multiple occasions throughout their concert tours, which received high praise.

In 2010, American folk-rock singer Lissie, began covering the song live in concert. Her cover earned praise from Kid Cudi, who posted the video on his official website, commenting that Lissie did a "great job" and that it was "just really beautiful and extremely flattering." She included the cover on her extended play/cover album, Covered Up with Flowers (2011). In 2012, Los Angeles–based rapper Schoolboy Q, sampled Lissie's cover version, for his song "Hands on the Wheel", taken from his album Habits & Contradictions (2012). In June 2014, Kid Cudi and Lissie performed the song together for the very first time at Le Divan du Monde in Paris, France.

In 2013, American rock band Nebraska Jones, also released a cover of "Pursuit of Happiness". In 2014, San Francisco–based indie dream pop musician Katie Day, released a cover version of "Pursuit of Happiness", where she played all the parts solo, supporting her melancholy sing-song with thick layers of drums, synth, piano, and eventually strings (each via keyboard).

In September 2017, American rapper KYLE, covered "Pursuit of Happiness", saying he chose to cover the song because it's one of his favorites and it helped him through a dark part of his life: "That song just got me just through a lot of tough times. I think Kid Cudi has this special gift to make music that can pick somebody off from a super dark place and put them in this happy, awesome, positive Pikachu filled place. And I always aspire to do the same thing. It almost taught me like why even I became a rapper in the first place."

== Live performances ==
The song made its US television debut on the Late Show with David Letterman on September 11, 2009. Cudi later performed the song on September 23, 2009, on Jimmy Kimmel Live. On April 9, 2022, Cudi performed a medley of "Stars in the Sky" (the lead single for the soundtrack to the film Sonic the Hedgehog 2) and "Pursuit of Happiness" at the 35th Annual Kids' Choice Awards for the first time.

== In other media ==
In 2012, the remix produced by Steve Aoki was featured in the trailers for the comedy film Project X and was later included on the film's soundtrack.

In 2013, American singer Lissie's cover version of the song was featured in Matt Johnson's debut film The Dirties.

In 2016, Lissie's cover was used for Nike's Unlimited Pursuit campaign, featuring American athletes Serena Williams and Simone Biles.

The Steve Aoki remix was featured in the Philadelphia Flyers goal song during the 2017-2018 season.

In 2020, the original song was heavily featured in a trailer for the Judd Apatow film The King of Staten Island, and was also included in the film.

In 2021, the song was used as part of the Montreal Canadiens pregame show as part of the playoff's montage.

That same year, Google UK featured the song's instrumental in the TV and YouTube ads for their new Pixel 6 smartphone.

In 2023, Apple TV's Shrinking, utilized "Pursuit of Happiness" for the show's official teaser.

The Toronto Maple Leafs currently use the Steve Aoki remix as their goal song, having done so since the 2023–24 season. However, this was dropped after one game due to complaints about lyrics relating to drunk driving.

== Track listing ==
- Digital download
1. Pursuit of Happiness (featuring MGMT & Ratatat) – 3:21
- CD Single (United Kingdom)
1. Pursuit of Happiness (featuring MGMT & Ratatat) – 3:21
- Digital download (Remix)
1. Pursuit of Happiness (Extended Steve Aoki Remix) (featuring MGMT & Ratatat) – 6:13
- International EP
1. Pursuit of Happiness (Nightmare) (featuring MGMT & Ratatat) – 4:55
2. Pursuit of Happiness (Benny Benassi Remix) [Extended] (featuring MGMT & Ratatat) – 5:28
3. Pursuit of Happiness (Steve Aoki Remix) [Extended] (featuring MGMT & Ratatat) – 6:13
4. Pursuit of Happiness (Sandy Vee Remix) [Extended] (featuring MGMT & Ratatat) – 5:26

== Personnel ==
- Kid Cudi - vocals
- Evan Mast - vocals
- Mike Stroud - guitar, vocals
- Andrew VanWyngarden - vocals, synthesizers, bass guitar, drums
- Ben Goldwasser - vocals, keyboards, synthesizers, piano
- Larry Gold - strings

== Charts ==
=== Weekly charts ===
Chart (2010–14)	Peak position
Australia (ARIA)	41
Austria (Ö3 Austria Top 40)	66
Belgium (Ultratop 50 Flanders)	9
Belgium (Ultratop 50 Wallonia)	3
Canada (Canadian Hot 100)	76
France (SNEP)	2
French Airplay (Nielsen Soundscan)	1
French Club 40 (SNEP)	1
Germany (GfK)	51
Ireland (IRMA)	24
Netherlands (Single Top 100)	49
Sweden (Sverigetopplistan)	39
Switzerland (Schweizer Hitparade)	50
UK Singles (Official Charts Company)	64
UK Hip Hop/R&B (Official Charts)	3
US Billboard Hot 100	59

Chart (2022)	Peak position
Global 200 (Billboard)	143

=== Year-end charts ===
Chart (2012)	Position
Belgium (Ultratop Flanders)	73
Belgium (Ultratop Wallonia)	23
France (SNEP)	18

Chart (2013)	Position
France (SNEP)	147

== Certifications ==
Region	Certification	Certified units/sales
Australia (ARIA)	Platinum	70,000^{^}
Belgium (BRMA)	Gold	15,000^{*}
Brazil (Pro-Música Brasil)	Platinum	60,000^{‡}
Denmark (IFPI Danmark)	Platinum	90,000^{‡}
Germany (BVMI)	Platinum	300,000^{‡}
Italy (FIMI)	Gold	25,000^{‡}
New Zealand (RMNZ)	5× Platinum	150,000^{‡}
Spain (Promusicae)	Gold	30,000^{‡}
United Kingdom (BPI)	2× Platinum	1,200,000^{‡}
United States (RIAA)	12× Platinum	12,000,000^{‡}
^{*} Sales figures based on certification alone.^{^} Shipments figures based on certification alone.^{‡} Sales+streaming figures based on certification alone.

== See also ==
- List of best-selling singles in the United States
- List of songs recorded by Kid Cudi
