= Strick (rapper) =

American rapper and singer

- Born: Tauren O'lander Strickland; Lumberton, North Carolina, U.S.
- Origin: Atlanta, Georgia, U.S.
- Genres: Hip hop; trap
- Occupations: Rapper; songwriter
- Years active: 2016–present
- Labels: YSL; 300

Tauren O'lander Strickland, known professionally as Strick, is a Grammy-nominated American rapper and songwriter who signed with Young Thug's YSL Records, 300 Entertainment, and Atlantic Records in 2018, and has been credited with songwriting work for other rappers.

== Early life and career ==
Strick was born in Lumberton, North Carolina, but raised, grew up and lived in Atlanta, Georgia. He enlisted in the United States Air Force after studying at High Point University and Emory University. In 2016, he began working closely with hip hop producer TM88. That year, Strick co-wrote four songs on TM88, Wiz Khalifa, and Juicy J's collaborative album Rude Awakening, "Ballin" by Juicy J, and "Coordinate" by Travis Scott, the latter of which appeared on Scott's second album Birds in the Trap Sing McKnight.

In 2017, Strick released the single "100 Degrees" featuring Young Thug. That same year, he released the mixtape risk=reward. The followup mixtape, risk=reward 2, was released in 2018. That same year, he featured on Young Thug's song "STS" from the Young Stoner Life Records album Slime Language. He officially signed to YSL Records/300 Entertainment in October 2018. In January 2019, he released the extended play (EP), See You When I Land. In June, he released the compilation album The Machine, Vol. 1. In July 2020, he released the single "Yacht Club" with Young Thug and Ty Dolla $ign, which became the lead single for his debut studio album, Strick Land (2021). Released in November of the following year, the album was to showcase a bright future in the wake of the COVID-19 pandemic.

In the summer of 2022, Strick accompanied American musician Kid Cudi on his To the Moon World Tour as an opening act.

== Discography ==
=== Albums ===
- Strick Land (2021)
- All Time High (2024)
- Lucky Stars (2026)

=== Mixtapes ===
- Risk=Reward (2017)
- Risk=Reward 2 (2018)
- See You When I Land (2019)
- The Machine Vol. 1 (2019)
- The Machine Vol. 2 (2019)
- The Machine Vol. 3 (2022)
- Machine On (2026)

=== EPs ===
- Pairadice (2018)
- REVENGERS (with Billyracxx) (2019)
- 2Late 2Apologize (2022)

== Songwriting credits ==
Credits adapted from BMI.

Title	Year	Artist(s)	Album	Credits	Written with
"I See It I Want It"	2016	TGOD Mafia	TGOD Mafia: Rude Awakening	Co-writer	Jordan Houston, Cameron Thomaz, Bryan Simmons, Jerami Davis, Kevin Gomringer, Tim Gomringer
"Bossed Up"	2016	TGOD Mafia	TGOD Mafia: Rude Awakening	Co-writer	Houston, Thomaz, Simmons, Davis, K. Gomringer, T. Gomringer
"She in Love"	2016	TGOD Mafia	TGOD Mafia: Rude Awakening	Co-writer	Houston, Thomaz, Simmons, Davis, K. Gomringer, T. Gomringer
"Stay the Same"	2016	TGOD Mafia	TGOD Mafia: Rude Awakening	Co-writer	Houston, Thomaz, Simmons, Davis, K. Gomringer, T. Gomringer
"Cell Ready"	2016	TGOD Mafia	TGOD Mafia: Rude Awakening	Co-writer	Houston, Thomaz, Simmons, K. Gomringer, T. Gomringer
"Mansion"	2016	Juicy J	Lit in Ceylon	Co-writer	Houston, Simmons, K. Gomringer, T. Gomringer
"Blue Bentley"	2016	Juicy J	Lit in Ceylon	Co-writer	Houston, Simmons, K. Gomringer, T. Gomringer
"Spazz"	2016	Dreezy	No Hard Feelings	Co-writer	Seandrea Sledge, Simmons, K. Gomringer, T. Gomringer
"Coordinate" (featuring Blac Youngsta)	2016	Travis Scott	Birds in the Trap Sing McKnight	Co-writer	Jacques Webster, Sammie Benson, Simmons, Kevin Gomringer, Tim Gomringer
"Rara" (featuring Lil Uzi Vert)	2016	Travis Scott	Non-album single	Co-writer	Webster, Simmons, K. Gomringer, T. Gomringer
"Lotto"	2016	Juicy J	Must Be Nice	Co-writer	Houston, Simmons, K. Gomringer, T. Gomringer
"Whatcha Gone Do"	2016	Juicy J	Must Be Nice	Co-writer	Houston, Simmons, K. Gomringer, T. Gomringer
"Panties" (featuring Jeremih)	2016	Juicy J	Must Be Nice	Co-writer	Houston, Simmons, K. Gomringer, T. Gomringer
"Floodgate"	2024	Nelly Furtado	7	Co-writer	Nelly Furtado, Isaac De Boni, Michael Mulé, Aaron Booe, Travis Walton, Ryland Kelly

== Concert tours ==
Headlining

Supporting

- Kid Cudi – To The Moon Tour (2022)
