= Tequila Shots =

2020 song by Kid Cudi

Song by Kid Cudi

from the album Man on the Moon III: The Chosen
- Released: December 11, 2020
- Recorded: 2020
- Genre: Pop-trap
- Length: 3:13 (original); 3:57 (Prime Day Show version)
- Label: Wicked Awesome; Republic
- Songwriters: Scott Mescudi; Oladipo Omishore; David Biral; Denzel Baptiste
- Producers: Dot da Genius; Take a Daytrip; Kid Cudi

"Tequila Shots" is a song by American rapper Kid Cudi, released on December 11, 2020 as part of his seventh studio album Man on the Moon III: The Chosen. The song was produced by Dot da Genius, Take a Daytrip and Cudi himself. In June 2022, the song reached platinum status, selling over 1 million units in the US. The song was later included on Cudi’s first greatest hits album The Boy Who Flew to the Moon, Vol. 1 (2022).

== Background ==
In an interview with Zane Lowe, Kid Cudi stated that "Tequila Shots" was the first song he made for Man on the Moon III which he finished before even deciding to make the album. He said of the song, "it sounds like such an introduction, it sounds like you pick right back up where we left off ten years ago", referring to the 2010 release of Man on the Moon II: The Legend of Mr. Rager.

The song was created on the day that Kid Cudi's collaboration with fellow American rapper Travis Scott, titled "The Scotts", reached the peak of the Billboard Hot 100 chart, marking Cudi's first number-one hit single in the US. Its title derived from Cudi, Dot da Genius and Take a Daytrip drinking shots of tequila in celebration.

== Composition ==
The song features "warped synths and distorted organs", as well as humming from Cudi. It has been described as reminiscent of his early music in style. Kid Cudi sings about facing internal conflicts relating to mental health which he thought had already been dealt with, and being ready to manage them.

== Critical reception ==
The song received generally positive reviews from critics. Aron A. of HotNewHipHop wrote that it "brings Cudi's long-time collaborator Dot Da Genius into the fold alongside Take A Daytrip for an exhilarating and psychedelic blast-off". Alphonse Pierre of Pitchfork called it the best song from Man on the Moon III.

== Live performances ==
Kid Cudi performed the song on Saturday Night Live on April 10, 2021.

== Other versions ==
In 2021, Kid Cudi released an alternate version of the song, which originally premiered on Amazon’s Prime Day Show. The alternate version was included on an extended play (EP) titled Prime Day Show x Kid Cudi, issued exclusively on Amazon Music, on June 17, 2021.

== Charts ==
Chart performance for "Tequila Shots"
| Chart (2020) | Peak position |
|---|---|
| Canada Hot 100 (Billboard) | 52 |
| France (SNEP) | 95 |
| Global 200 (Billboard) | 37 |
| Ireland (IRMA) | 51 |
| New Zealand Hot Singles (RMNZ) | 6 |
| Portugal (AFP) | 146 |
| Switzerland (Schweizer Hitparade) | 73 |
| UK Singles (OCC) | 86 |
| US Billboard Hot 100 | 41 |
| US Hot R&B/Hip-Hop Songs (Billboard) | 7 |

== Certifications ==
Certifications for "Tequila Shots"
| Region | Certification | Certified units/sales |
|---|---|---|
| United States (RIAA) | Platinum | 1,000,000^{‡} |
^{‡} Sales+streaming figures based on certification alone.
