= Maui Wowie =

2008 song by Kid Cudi

Song by Kid Cudi

from the album A Kid Named Cudi
- Released: July 17, 2008
- Recorded: 2007–2008
- Genre: Electro-hop; alternative hip hop
- Length: 2:24
- Label: 10.Deep; Fool's Gold
- Songwriters: Scott Mescudi; John Stephens; Kanye West; Jeremy Hannah; Andre Wallace; Tony Castillo; Rick Shobin
- Producers: Kid Cudi; Plain Pat

"Maui Wowie" is a song by American rapper Kid Cudi from his debut mixtape A Kid Named Cudi (2008). Produced by Cudi and Plain Pat, it contains a sample of "I'm So High" by Grind Mode and interpolation of "Let's Get Lifted" by John Legend. The song is a tribute to a cannabis strain from Hawaii, which it is named after. It gained renewed popularity in the fall of 2025 when it went viral on the video-sharing app TikTok.

== TikTok virality ==
On September 5, 2025, a TikTok user posted a video of himself hanging from a crosswalk sign while lip-syncing lyrics from the song's chorus: "Goin' back to Honolulu just to get that / That Maui Wowie, that Maui Wowie". The clip ignited a trend of people singing these lyrics as they are dangling from street signs, traffic lights, and infrastructure. The song significantly increased in streaming as a result, and entered Spotify's daily songs chart at number 98 and the Viral 50 in October. Kid Cudi showed appreciation and also participated in the trend, with a video of himself hanging from a traffic light. The challenge has led to warnings about the dangers of this activity from TikTok authorities and the Land Transport Authority of Singapore, the latter stating "Fun's fun, but our road infrastructure isn't a playground. It helps facilitate travel and keeps everyone safe. Please don't use them as props for social media. Let's keep our roads safe." In November 2025, Darren Espanto made a cover of it.

== Charts ==
Chart performance for "Maui Wowie"
Chart (2025)	Peak position
Australia On Replay Singles (ARIA)	13
Canada Hot 100 (Billboard)	50
Global 200 (Billboard)	156
Latvia Streaming (LaIPA)	19
Lithuania (AGATA)	18
Philippines Hot 100 (Billboard Philippines)	71
Poland (Polish Streaming Top 100)	95
Switzerland (Schweizer Hitparade)	97
UK Hip Hop/R&B (Official Charts)	15
US Billboard Hot 100	71
US Hot R&B/Hip-Hop Songs (Billboard)	15
