= List of songs recorded by Kid Cudi =

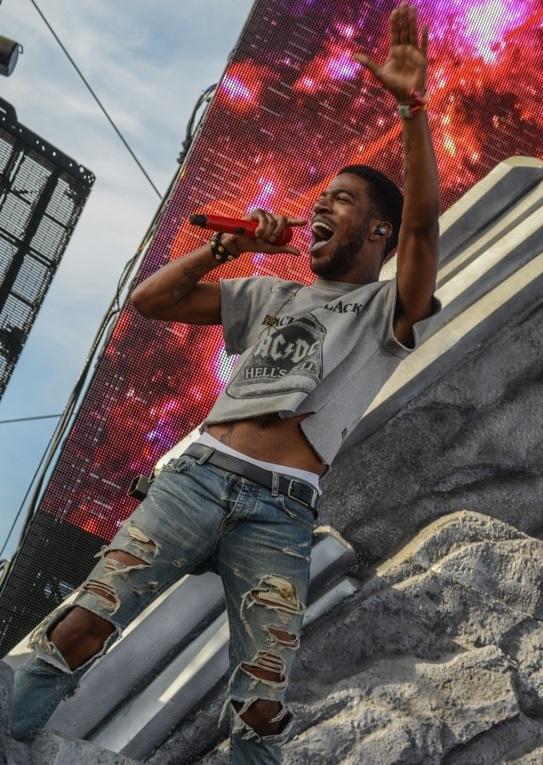
Kid Cudi performing at the Coachella Valley Music and Arts Festival in 2014 in Indio, California

American rapper Kid Cudi has recorded material for 10 studio albums (including two collaborative albums), three extended plays (EPs), in addition to one mixtape, and has been featured on songs on other artists' respective albums. After gaining major recognition with his debut single "Day n Nite" and his breakout mixtape A Kid Named Cudi, he went on to sign a record deal with GOOD Music, and subsequently began working on his major-label debut, Man on the Moon: The End of Day.

== Non-album songs ==
Non-album songs recorded by Kid Cudi
Song	Artist(s)	Note(s)	Originating album	Ref.
"All Summer"	Kid Cudi, Rostam Batmanglij, Bethany Cosentino	Produced by Rostam Batmanglij; American shoe company Converse released the song as a promotional single for their "Three Artists. One Song." campaign.; Also released in a limited edition 7-inch vinyl format	—N/a	
"Daps & Pounds"	Kid Cudi	Produced by The Jungle Club; Released in celebration of 420, on April 20, 2009	Man on the Moon: The End of Day	
"Dat New 'New'"	Kid Cudi	Produced by Dot da Genius; B-side of "Day n Nite"	A Kid Named Cudi	
"Dennis, Hook Me Up with Some More of This Whiskey!"	Kid Cudi	Produced by Kid Cudi; Cudi reversed the instrumental from his own song "Ghost!", and added new drums and guitar.	—N/a	
"Goodbye"	Kid Cudi	Produced by Cudi and Dot da Genius, collectively known as WZRD; Samples dialogue by Tupac Shakur from the 1992 film Juice, as well as vocals by English rock band Pink Floyd from their 1979 song "Goodbye Cruel World"	Passion, Pain & Demon Slayin'	
"JFKPSA"	Kid Cudi	Produced by Kid Cudi; Contains vocal samples of John F. Kennedy	Speedin' Bullet 2 Heaven	
"Leader of the Delinquents"	Kid Cudi	Produced by Dot da Genius and Arkateqq; Cudi was first performing the song at his concert shows in 2012; later released the song in 2020 as a stand-alone single	Indicud	
"Perfect Is the Word"	WZRD (Note: Rock band composed of Kid Cudi and Dot da Genius)	Produced by WZRD; Originally meant to be the first single from their debut album, when they were still calling themselves 2 Be Continuum	WZRD	
"The Scotts"	The Scotts (Note: Hip hop duo composed of Kid Cudi and Travis Scott)	Produced by Take a Daytrip, Dot da Genius and Plain Pat; Debut single from The Scotts, originally meant to be the first single from their debut album	The Scotts	

== Freestyle songs ==
Freestyle songs recorded by Kid Cudi
Song	Artist(s)	Note(s)	Original song	Ref.
"'09 Freestyle"	Kid Cudi		"Drop" by Rich Boy	
"Angels"	Kid Cudi		"Angels" by Diddy – Dirty Money	
"The Biggest Grinder"	Kid Cudi		"The Boss" by Rick Ross	
"Buggin Out '09"	Kid Cudi, Consequence		"Buggin' Out" by A Tribe Called Quest	
"Can I Be"	Kid Cudi		"Someone Great" by LCD Soundsystem	
"Cuditastic"	Kid Cudi		"Players" by Slum Village / "Fantastic" by Slum Village	
"Cudderisback"	Kid Cudi		"Ottoman" by Vampire Weekend	
"DJ Enuff Freestyle"	Kid Cudi, Asher Roth		"Tried by 12" by East Flatbush Project	
"Excuse My Mood"	Kid Cudi		"Kinda Like a Big Deal" by Clipse featuring Kanye West	
"Fine China"	Kid Cudi		"Fine China" by Chris Brown	
"Higher Up"	Kid Cudi		"Imagine" by Snoop Dogg featuring Dr. Dre and D'Angelo	
"Hip Hop Hooray"	Kid Cudi		"Hip Hop Hooray" by Naughty by Nature	
"Hottest in the Hood"	Kid Cudi		"Hottest in the Hood" by Red Café	
"London Girls"	Kid Cudi	Alternately known as "Done Pimpin"	"Addiction" by Ryan Leslie	
"Love Stoned"	Kid Cudi		"LoveStoned" by Justin Timberlake	
"Pion"	Kid Cudi			
"Paper Planes"	Kid Cudi		"Paper Planes" by M.I.A.	
"Who's Real"	Kid Cudi		"Who's Real" by OJ da Juiceman	

== Unreleased songs ==
Unreleased songs recorded by Kid Cudi
Song	Artist(s)	Note(s)	Originating album	Leak	Ref.
"Alien"	Kanye West, Kid Cudi	Failed to make Jesus Is King or Donda; Produced by Ronald Spence Jr.; Iterations/demos have been recorded by Ant Clemons, the Migos, 2 Chainz, Lil Baby, Mykki Blanco, and Sean Leon among others.	Jesus is King	Yes	
"All Life Long"	Juice Wrld, Kid Cudi	Produced by Take a Daytrip; Alternately known as "Good Time"; The original version of the track, sans Cudi, was previewed on Juice Wrld's social media via Instagram Live on June 12, 2019; Cudi's feature was added at a later date and leaked on July 12, 2020.	Legends Never Die	Yes	
"Angels and Demons"	Kid Cudi	Originally meant to feature hip hop duo Clipse; Failed to make Man on the Moon: The End of Day due to leak; Leaked among several other demos for Man on the Moon: The End of Day	Man on the Moon: The Guardians	Yes	
"Bigger Than You"	Kid Cudi	Produced by Emile Haynie; Alternately known as "Do It Alone"; Failed to make Man on the Moon: The End of Day due to leak; Leaked among several other demos for Man on the Moon: The End of Day	Man on the Moon: The Guardians	Yes	
"Call Me Moon Man"	Kid Cudi	Failed to make Man on the Moon: The End of Day due to leak; Leaked among several other demos for Man on the Moon: The End of Day	Man on the Moon: The Guardians	Yes	
"Can't Look in My Eyes"	Kid Cudi, Kanye West	Produced by Kid Cudi and Dot da Genius; Ultimately released as "Too Bad I Have to Destroy You Now", sans Kanye West; Unreleased due to sample clearance issues.; The production samples Daft Punk’s song “Son of Flynn” from the soundtrack to the 2010 film Tron: Legacy. It also samples vocals from Michael Jackson’s “You Rock My World”.	Satellite Flight: The Journey to Mother Moon	Yes	
"Capcom"	Kid Cudi	Produced by Chad Hugo; Recorded in 2010, leaked in 2011; Demo track for an unreleased Street Fighter soundtrack curated by Chad Hugo and Kenna	A Man Named Scott	Yes	
"Chillen While We Sippin"	The Almighty GloryUs (Note: Hip hop duo composed of Kid Cudi and King Chip)	Produced by Blended Babies and Chuck Inglish; Recorded in 2010, leaked by producers in 2014	The Almighty GloryUs	Yes	
"Come Around"	Kid Cudi	Failed to make Man on the Moon: The End of Day due to leak; Leaked among several other demos for Man on the Moon: The End of Day	Man on the Moon: The Guardians	Yes	
"Company"	Lil Nas X, Kid Cudi	Leaked in June 2022	Montero (Deluxe)	Yes	
"Crusin (In the Evening)"	Kid Cudi, In-Doe	Alternately known as "N the Evening"	Cudder: The Revolution of Evolution	Yes	
"Day 'n' Nite (Remix)"	Kid Cudi	Recorded the day after he recorded the original in 2007	Satellite Flight: The Journey to Mother Moon	No	
"Deep Sleep (Love Connection Part II)"	Kid Cudi		Man on the Moon II: Ghost in the Machine	No	
"Did You Get It"	Kid Cudi		Man on the Moon II: Ghost in the Machine	Yes	
"Erase Me (Steve Aoki Remix)"	Kid Cudi		Bill & Ted Face the Music: The Original Motion Picture Soundtrack	No	
"Floatin' in the Sky"	N.O.R.E, Kid Cudi	Leaked in 2009	S.O.R.E.	Yes	
"Follow Me"	Kid Cudi	Failed to make Man on the Moon: The End of Day due to leak; Leaked among several other demos for Man on the Moon: The End of Day	Man on the Moon: The Guardians	Yes	
"Get Ya Mind Correct"	Kid Mesc	Recorded sometime between 2002 and 2003	Rap Hard	Yes	
"Groovin'"	Kid Cudi	Originally meant for Cudder: The Revolution of Evolution before it was scrapped for Man on the Moon II: The Legend of Mr. Rager	Cudder: The Revolution of Evolution	No	
"Highs n Lows"	Kid Cudi	Produced by Dot da Genius; Alternately known as "I Be"; Failed to make Man on the Moon: The End of Day due to leak; Leaked among several other demos for Man on the Moon: The End of Day	Man on the Moon: The Guardians	Yes	
"I Do My Thing"	Kid Cudi, Snoop Dogg	Produced by Watts & Ringo; Originally meant for Cudder: The Revolution of Evolution before it was scrapped for Man on the Moon II: The Legend of Mr. Rager	Cudder: The Revolution of Evolution	Yes	
"I Get It In"	Kid Cudi	Leak from Man on the Moon: The Guardians	Man on the Moon: The Guardians	Yes	
"I Hear Them Calling"	Kid Cudi	Reference track for Eminem; Production often miscredited to Eminem; Leaked among several other demos for Man on the Moon: The End of Day		Yes	
"I'm Not Your Average"	Kid Mesc	Recorded sometime between 2002 and 2003	Rap Hard	Yes	
"I'm That"	Kid Mesc	Recorded sometime between 2002 and 2003	Rap Hard	Yes	
"Know Why"	Kid Cudi	Produced by Dot da Genius; Rumored to be recorded in 2008; leaked in 2010; Alternately known as "The Message"		Yes	
"Leanin' in Cleveland"	Kid Cudi	Leaked in 2014	The Almighty GloryUs	Yes	
"Mr. K.I.D."	Kid Mesc	Recorded sometime between 2002 and 2003	Rap Hard	Yes	
"Never Come Down"	Kid Cudi	Failed to make Man on the Moon: The End of Day due to leak; Leaked among several other demos for Man on the Moon: The End of Day	Man on the Moon: The Guardians	Yes	
"Party All the Time"	Kid Mesc	Recorded sometime between 2002 and 2003	Rap Hard	Yes	
"Pimpin’"	Kid Mesc	Recorded sometime between 2002 and 2003	Rap Hard	Yes	
"Pissy Pamper (Remix)"	Young Nudy, Pi'erre Bourne, Playboi Carti, Kid Cudi	Unreleased due to sample clearance issues	Sli'merre	No	
"Pushing Niggas"	Kid Mesc	Recorded sometime between 2002 and 2003	Rap Hard	Yes	
"Rain"	Kid Mesc	Recorded sometime between 2002 and 2003	Rap Hard	Yes	
"Rolling Stone"	Don Toliver, Kid Cudi		Love Sick	Yes	
"Shed a Little Light"	Kid Mesc	Recorded sometime between 2002 and 2003.	Rap Hard	Yes	
"Solo Dolo Pt. IV"	Kid Cudi, Playboi Carti	In November 2022, during one of his To the Moon World Tour stops in Europe, Cudi debuted “Solo Dolo Pt. IV”.; The song contains a sample of the original "Solo Dolo (Nightmare)" track, featured on his 2009 debut album, Man on the Moon: The End of Day.; Failed to make final tracklisting due to Playboi Carti not clearing his feature.	Insano	No	
"Spontaneously Combust"	Kid Mesc	Recorded sometime between 2002 and 2003	Rap Hard	Yes	
"Starz"	Lil Nas X, Kid Cudi	Ultimately released as "Stars in the Sky", sans Lil Nas X	Montero (Deluxe)	Yes	
"Sunrise"	Kid Cudi	Produced by Kid Cudi and Plain Pat; The track contains a sample of Norah Jones’s 2004 single "Sunrise" throughout.	Passion, Pain & Demon Slayin'	Yes	
"Super Boo"	Kid Cudi	Failed to make Man on the Moon: The End of Day due to leak	Man on the Moon: The Guardians	Yes	
"That Girl"	Kid Cudi	Failed to make Man on the Moon: The End of Day due to leak; Leaked among several other demos for Man on the Moon: The End of Day	Man on the Moon: The Guardians	Yes	
"Warlords"	Childish Gambino, Kid Cudi	"Warlords" was first recorded by Childish Gambino around August 23, 2018, during the sessions for Almanac, the original version of his fourth studio album before that idea was scrapped and the album eventually evolved into 3.15.20.; Leaked in February 2023	3.15.20	Yes	
"Who I Am"	Kid Cudi	Failed to make Man on the Moon: The End of Day due to leak; Leaked among several other demos for Man on the Moon: The End of Day	Man on the Moon: The Guardians	Yes	
"Wild'n Cuz I'm Young (Remix)"	Kid Cudi, Kanye West, Jay-Z	The version with Kanye West leaked in August 2010	Man on the Moon II: The Legend of Mr. Rager	No	
