= List of PAN dating software =

PAN dating software is computer software to encourage conversation with others on a similar wireless network.

- Bawadu
- BlackPeopleMeet
- Live Radar
- MobiLuck
- Nokia Sensor
- Proxy Dating

== See also ==
- Lovegety
- Toothing
