= LP3 (Ratatat album) =

Studio album by Ratatat
- Released: July 8, 2008
- Recorded: 2008
- Studio: Old Soul Studios in New York City
- Genre: Experimental rock; neo-psychedelia; electronica; electronic rock; art rock
- Length: 42:24
- Label: XL Recordings
- Producer: Evan Mast, Mike Stroud

Ratatat chronology
Ratatat Remixes Vol. 2 (2007)	LP3 (2008)	LP4 (2010)

Singles from LP3
- 1. "Shiller" Released: May 6, 2008; 2. "Shempi" Released: September 23, 2008; 3. "Mirando" Released: February 3, 2009

Professional ratings
Aggregate scores
Source	Rating
Metacritic	71/100
Review scores
Source	Rating
AbsolutePunk.net	(84%) link
AllMusic	link
Drowned in Sound	(7/10) link
Entertainment Weekly	(A)
Pitchfork Media	(7.2/10) link
PopMatters	(6/10) link
The Skinny	link
Spin	link

LP3 is the third studio album (or third LP) by Ratatat, released on July 8, 2008. It contains the single "Shiller" originally released on 7" vinyl. The duo experimented with different genres as well as synthesizer patches, percussion instruments, sound effects, and samples. Unlike the albums Ratatat and Classics, LP3 was recorded in a few weeks.

== Track listing ==
No.	Title	Length
1.	"Shiller"	4:18
2.	"Falcon Jab"	3:55
3.	"Mi Viejo"	2:40
4.	"Mirando"	3:52
5.	"Flynn"	1:56
6.	"Bird Priest"	3:07
7.	"Shempi"	3:58
8.	"Imperials"	3:34
9.	"Dura"	3:08
10.	"Bruleé"	3:43
11.	"Mumtaz Khan"	2:38
12.	"Gipsy Threat"	1:38
13.	"Black Heroes"	4:06

iTunes Store bonus track

14. "Mirando" (Yacht Remix) – 2:51

Amazon MP3 bonus track

14. "Shempi" (E*Rock Remix) – 5:15

Japanese bonus tracks

14. "Shempi" (E*Rock Remix) – 5:15
15. "Shempi" (Zongamin Remix) – 3:49
16. "Falcon Jab" (Copy Remix) – 5:26
17. "Mirando" (Animal Collective Remix) – 9:57
18. "Mirando" (Yacht Remix) – 2:51

== Charts ==
=== Weekly charts ===
Chart (2008)	Peak position
US Billboard 200	82
US Top Dance/Electronic Albums (Billboard)	2

=== Year-end charts ===
Chart (2008)	Position
US Top Dance/Electronic Albums (Billboard)	25
