= Melodica in music =

Musical instrument in which the user blows air through a reeded keyboard

The melodica is an uncommon musical instrument in which the user blows air through a reeded keyboard. With its distinctive sound, the melodica has been used both for novelty purposes and as an instrument favored by certain performers.

== Musicians by country ==
=== Australia ===
- The animated series Bluey uses a melodica in its theme song.
- Benny Davis, keyboardist and vocalist for the Australian comedy band The Axis of Awesome, is commonly seen with a melodica.
- Ollie McGill of the Australian band The Cat Empire often plays melodica along with his keyboard.

=== Canada ===
- The New Pornographers feature melodica on "The Bleeding Heart Show" from the album Twin Cinema.
- Played by Torngat's Pietro Amato.
- A.C. Newman uses the melodica on songs from his album The Slow Wonder.

=== Finland ===
- Miikka Huttunen of Alamaailman Vasarat uses the melodica in some of the band's songs.

=== Great Britain ===
Groups

- Bark Psychosis feature melodica on the song "Absent Friend" from the album Hex
- In live shows & on the original recording Bauhaus frontman Peter Murphy plays a melodica on the song "She's in Parties".
- Belle and Sebastian's song "Electronic Renaissance" from the album Tigermilk features a melodica solo.
- British rock band Clinic features a melodica frequently both live and on record.
- Franz Ferdinand used a melodica in their song "40".
- Jon King of the British post-punk band Gang of Four frequently played a melodica in their earlier records.
- The Go! Team's song "Huddle Formation" features one throughout.
- The melodica is also featured in the song "Cash Machine" by British band Hard-Fi, played by singer songwriter Richard Archer, which opens the group's debut album Stars of CCTV.
- Joy Division use it on their Closer song "Decades", and also on a demo version of "In A Lonely Place" (later redone by New Order).
- British Rock Band Keane used a melodica for the bridge in their b-side "Fly to Me", a fan favorite.
- Damon Albarn uses a melodica with both The Good, the Bad & the Queen and Gorillaz, featured prominently on the singles "Clint Eastwood" and "Tomorrow Comes Today" from the self-titled debut album by the latter.
- The Kinks use a melodica played by Nicky Hopkins on their hit single "Sunny Afternoon".
- The Magic Numbers have a full-time melodica player, Angela Gannon (although she also provides backing and occasional lead vocals, and does not play melodica on every song).
- Raul Emilio Reyes plays melodica in Melodica, Melody & Me, in 2010 released Piece Me Back Together/ Plunge on Everybody's Stalking, in 2011 released Come Outside/ Ode to Victor Jara
- New Order's opening to "Love Vigilantes" (From Low-life) features a prominent melodica solo, as well as "Truth", (From Movement), "Hurt" (the b-side to "Temptation"), "Your Silent Face" (From Power, Corruption & Lies), "Angel Dust" (From Brotherhood), "Fine Time" (From Technique) and "Run Wild" (From Get Ready).
- The band Oasis uses a melodica in the song "Champagne Supernova".
- The Alan Price Rhythm & Blues Combo, on "Pretty Thing" (from the 1963 EP I Just Wanna Make Love to You). Price plays in much the same way a blues musician would play the harmonica.
- Franny Griffiths of Space played melodica on some of Space's songs, such as "Hell's Barbecue" and "Spiders".
- James Lascelles, the current keyboard player of Steve Harley and Cockney Rebel uses a melodica on "Stranger Comes To Town", "The Lighthouse", and the improvisation section at the end of the band's 1975 hit "The Best Years Of Our Lives" when they are played during Steve Harley's live shows, both as a rock band, and as a 3-man acoustic set.
- Strawberry Switchblade use a melodica in their song "Being Cold".
- Supertramp's John Helliwell used a melodica on the song "From Now On" on Even in the Quietest Moments and bandmate Rick Davies used it on "It's Raining Again" on ...Famous Last Words...
- British band Will and the People use melodica for numerous songs, most notably during acoustic sets when they perform their single "Lion In The Morning Sun".
- Dave McCabe of the Zutons plays melodica on the instrumental "Zuton Karmun".

Solo Artists

- The melodica, played by Harry Maslin, is featured on the 1975 hit song "Golden Years" by David Bowie.
- Alison Goldfrapp, the lead of the electronica duo Goldfrapp, plays the melodica on "Paper Bag" and "U.K. Girls (Physical)" from their debut album Felt Mountain.
- On The Desert Sessions 9 & 10, PJ Harvey plays the melodica during the song, "Holey Dime".
- Joe Jackson has played the melodica on many of his albums.
- John Lennon can be seen and heard playing the introductory notes to "Strawberry Fields Forever" on a melodica in a hotel room in the film The Beatles: The First U.S. Visit which was filmed in February 1964, two years before the song was properly written and three before it was released, the song eventually instead used a Mellotron.
- Children's television presenter Alan Taylor often played the melodica on the magazine programme Tinker and Taylor.

=== Iceland ===
- The Icelandic musical group múm are well known for both recording with and using melodicas live, sometimes with the entire band playing them on stage in unison.

=== Jamaica ===
- Augustus Pablo popularized the use of the melodica in reggae music. Multiple album covers feature Pablo playing the instrument.
- Peter Tosh played Melodica on many Wailers recordings such as "Sun Is Shining" and "Memphis", and also played on numerous sessions for other reggae artists, many of which are collected on his Arise Black Man compilation.

=== Japan ===
- The Tokyo Ska Paradise Orchestra songs "Ska Me Crazy", "the PIRATES", "Skarada", and others feature a melodica prominently.
- Japanese Jazz Pianist Kokubu Hiroko plays pianica in her album Heaven and Beyond.

=== Mexico ===
- Emmanuel del Real Díaz from Café Tacuba often plays a melodica.

=== Netherlands ===
- Clan of Xymox uses melodica in the song "Imagination" from the album Twist of Shadows.
- Thijs van Leer of Focus regularly plays melodica at their concerts.

=== South Korea ===
- The Korean musicians Yozoh and Yeongene play melodica.

=== Spain ===
- Mario Fueyo, a versatile Asturian musician also known as Dark la eMe, plays a melodica in one song at concerts of the band Dixebra.

=== United States ===
Groups

- Orleans uses the melodica on "Dance With Me".
- Vacation Eyes by the Jonas Brothers features a melodica solo performed on the album by Clyde Lawrence, and in live performances usually by the band's longtime keyboardist Michael Wooten.
- At The Drive In used the melodica in the track Enfilade from their breakthrough album Relationship of Command.
- Serj Tankian plays one in the Axis of Justice song "Jeffrey Are You Listening?".
- Ben Folds Five used a Melodica on the song "Smoke" both live and in the studio; Folds also played the melodica during live shows to perform the clarinet parts of "Steven's Last Night in Town." Both songs are found on their 1997 album Whatever and Ever Amen.
- Big D and the Kids Table uses the melodica on songs from the album Strictly Rude.
- BLACKstreet's 1997 hit "Don't leave me" from their album Another Level features a melodica solo.
- The band The Builders and the Butchers uses a melodica in their song "Short Way Home".
- Cake's Vincent DiFiore played the instrument on "End of the Movie", from 2004's Pressure Chief and used it in their music video for "The Distance".
- Combustible Edison use a melodica as principal instrument in the song "Alright, Already", from the album Schizophonic.
- In live shows, The Decemberists have been known to bring a melodica out on occasion, in particular for The Tain.
- The Eels use a melodica in the song "The Bride of Theme From Blinking Lights" on the similarly titled 2005 CD Blinking Lights and Other Revelations. Bandmember The Chet can be seen playing it on the Eels with Strings: Live at Town Hall DVD.
- The band Faith No More uses this instrument as well. It is played by Mike Patton, the vocalist, during the songs "Midnight Cowboy" and "This Guy's in Love with You". Patton has also used the melodica in his band Fantomas to play the intro to the cover version of the theme to The Godfather in both a live setting and on the album The Director's Cut.
- The band Foxing uses the melodica in the songs "Redwoods" and "Indica" from their 2015 album Dealer.
- The San Francisco indie rock band, Girls, use the melodica in their song "Lust For Life" on their album titled Album. It is used during the outro of the song.
- Musical comedy duo member Chris Hardwick (of MTV's Singled Out fame) plays the melodica on Hard 'n Phirm's debut album Horses and Grasses.
- Shehan Nattar plays a Hohner 32 melodica frequently on the Original Motion Picture Soundtrack, an instrumental rock album by the Heavenly Oceans.
- Punk Band Hed PE is known for using a melodica played by frontman Jared Gomes
- The Hooters take their name from "the hooter", a nickname for the melodica that is present in so many of their songs.
- The Indigo Girls use a melodica frequently, including in their song "Dead Man's Hill" off the Swamp Ophelia album.
- The Jack's Mannequin song "La La Lie" contains a brief melodica lead during the bridge of the song.
- When live in concert, Jars of Clay uses a melodica for a cover of the Gerry Rafferty song "Baker Street", in which Dan Haseltine uses the melodica in lieu of the original saxophone for the chorus of the song.
- Jump, Little Children made use of the melodica on their early albums The Licorice Tea Demos and Magazine. It is played by Matthew Bivins on numerous songs.
- Tim Convy of the band Ludo plays a melodica in the song "Streetlights", from the album You're Awful, I Love You. He also uses it for acoustic sets and during live performances.
- Man Man incorporates several melodicas into their live show.
- Punk band Parquet Courts has used a melodica in recordings and live performances.
- Jazz pianist John Medeski often plays a melodica during encores in performances with jazz trio Medeski, Martin & Wood.
- The band My favorite frequently uses the Melodica.
- The Pietasters use a melodica on the song "Crying Over You," from their 1999 album Awesome Mix Tape vol. 6
- During Primus' live shows in 2003 during the song "Sathington Waltz", a friend of the band named Adam Gates would appear on stage and play a melodica in a George Bush mask. He would also appear during the last song of the Sailing the Seas of Cheese set on the song "Los Bastardos", playing one of Les Claypool's basses while Claypool himself would play drums.
- Ratatat use a melodica on their song "Grape Juice City" from their LP4 album.
- Red Hot Chili Peppers song "On Mercury" from their 2002 album, By the Way, contains a melodica throughout.
- The rock band R.E.M. included bass melodica, performed by lead vocalist Michael Stipe, on their song "Endgame" from the album Out of Time.
- A member of The Residents played melodica on the "Demons Dance Alone" tour.
- The Rudiments use the melodica on songs from their album Circle Our Empire.
- Say Anything used a melodica on the song "I Want To Know Your Plans" from their album ...Is a Real Boy
- Smoosh has introduced the melodica to their keyboard line-up in their song "In the Fall".
- The Society of Rockets feature the melodica prominently on their song, "The Flood". The band's previous incarnation, The Shimmer Kids Underpop Association, utilized the melodica frequently, most notably on "The Hangman's Come-On".
- The melodica is featured heavily in the music of Stay Human, played by bandleader Jon Batiste
- Steely Dan (Donald Fagen) on "Babylon Sisters" and "Hey Nineteen" from Gaucho, also on "Peg" from the album Aja.
- Kyle Hollingsworth of The String Cheese Incident often uses a melodica in a number of songs and very randomly, due to the improvisational nature of the band.
- Umphrey's McGee use it on "Liquid" both on their album Safety In Numbers and their live show.
- Bernie Worrell played melodica on multiple recordings in Bootsy Collins's discography.

Solo Artists

- Korean-American artist Clara Chung plays a melodica in her song "Offbeat", the lead single on her first album, Art in My Heart.
- Jazz drummer Jack DeJohnette doubled on melodica on his debut recording as leader, The DeJohnette Complex from 1968. He also plays melodica on other albums, including Special Edition from 1980 with alto saxophonist Arthur Blythe, tenor saxophonist David Murray and cellist Peter Warren.
- Donald Fagen on "Mary Shut The Garden Door" from his solo album Morph the Cat; as well as "IGY" from The Nightfly
- A sample of a melodica is on John Frusciante's (Red Hot Chili Peppers Ex-guitarist) album Curtains. It is played near the end of "A Name".
- Jack Johnson uses the melodica on his song "If I Could" on the album In Between Dreams, on "No Good With Faces" on the album "To the Sea" and on his rendition of the song "Escape (The Pina Colada Song)"
- In the Cyndi Lauper video for "Money Changes Everything", the keyboard player plays a melodica.
- YouTube hit Julia Nunes uses the melodica to add complexity to many of her original songs and covers.
- Billy Preston can be seen to use a melodica on his Midnight Special performance of "Will It Go Round in Circles".
- Steve Reich composed Melodica (1966) for melodica and tape.
- Esperanza Spalding's 2010 Chamber Music Society features melodica played by Leo Genovese.
- Grammy-winning salsa jazz singer-songwriter Alexa Weber Morales plays a melodica intro and solo on her song "When the Night is Cool" on her 2011 album "I Wanna Work For You".

==== Puerto Rico ====
- Calle 13's popular music video "No hay nadie como tú" (2009) has a Melodica in the intro of the song, and it shows the player at 3:02.

== Other uses ==
- Christoph Rayburn composed the first concerto for Melodica and orchestra in 2025.
- In Turkey, Melodicas are used on music class in first grade school.
- In the PDQ Bach oratorio "Oedipus Tex", a melodica is used as the continuo instrument.
- British musician Damon Albarn has frequently used the melodica, most notably on the movie soundtrack 101 Reykjavík, on the Mali Music collaboration project and with animated band Gorillaz. In their self-titled debut album the instrument heavily features in the popular singles "Clint Eastwood", "Latin Simone (Que Pasa Contigo?)", "Man Research (Clapper)", and "Tomorrow Comes Today". It has also been noted that Gorillaz vocalist 2D is a "melodica maniac". Albarn's other uses of the melodica can be found on Blur's 1999 album 13, with the instrument playing Mellow Song's main hook, and his solo album Democrazy. This may be why the melodica is listed as one of Gorillaz cartoon singer 2D's interests on MTV Cribs.
- Jazz pianist Herbie Hancock used a melodica in the recording of the soundtrack for the film Blow-Up.
- Pianist Erich Overhultz plays a Suzuki melodica on "Gus", an original instrumental from his 2006 CD Music, Miscellany, and the Miracle of Life. He played the same instrument with the Magic City Rhythm Kings on their 1984 reggae gospel release "He Loves He Lives".
- The 2004 hit manga/anime/live-action Nodame Cantabile used several Yamaha melodicas in an ensemble arrangement of Gershwin's "Rhapsody in Blue," with the orchestra using blue P-32D 32-key models. While Nodame used the P-32DP (pink P-32D) version of the Yamaha melodica in the anime version, the live drama adaptation performed by the Nodame Orchestra (which was supervised by the Tokyo Metropolitan Symphony Orchestra) features her using the P-37D 37-key model. Chiaki referred to the melodicas as "Pianica."
- A melodica is used in the theme of the American mockumentary The Office.
- American multi-instrumentalist James Howard Young has transcribed and performed several Bach orchestral works for overdubbed melodicas including soprano, alto, and bass.
- Pocket Penguin uses a melodica in combination with classical guitar.
- Kirby's Epic Yarn uses a melodica in some of its tracks, such as "Green Greens".
- The anime/manga Your Lie in April features Kaori Miyazono, one of its central characters, playing a Yamaha Pianica P-32D often (similar to the ones used by the Nodame Orchestra).
