= Copy (musician) =

American electronic music artist

Copy
Name	Marius Libman
City	Portland, Oregon
Record Label	Audio Dregs
Releases
Mobius Beard (2006)
Hair Guitar (2007)
Hard Dream (2010)
Chalice Agenda (2015)
Other Links
MySpace	Facebook
COPY	SoundCloud

Copy, real name Marius Libman, is an electronic music artist on the Audio Dregs record label. He has released four full-length albums, along with three "DJ Copy" remix CDs. Copy was chosen as the winner of Willamette Week's "Best New Band" award for 2006, which showcases the top new artists in Copy's native Portland, Oregon.

== Bootleg Remix CDs ==
In 2006, Copy released his first remix CD under the 'DJ Copy' moniker – it featured 6 remixes of R&B/pop artists including Mariah Carey and Mary J. Blige. The disc was called "The Diva Mixtape" and was not released digitally. The next year, DJ Copy released another remix CD – this time of rap group Bone Thugs-N-Harmony. The disc was titled "Bone Thugs-N-Harmony-N-Copy", and featured 6 remixes of songs by the group including "Ecstasy" and "Tha Crossroads". The disc came with CD order of Hair Guitar from Audio Dregs. In the same frame of time that Hard Dream was produced, Copy created a remix CD of R. Kelly songs called "The Pied Piper of Electro". It came free with a preorder of the Hard Dream CD from Audio Dregs. Regarding the R. Kelly CD, Libman said in an interview with Willamette Week that he "grew up listening to a lot of hip-hop and R&B, but it's never really come to the forefront of [his] music until now".

=== Hard Dream ===
Copy's first two albums were released in close succession (2006 and 2007), and he didn't release much music until 2010 (according to the Willamette Week's Local Cut, he was doing a lot of DJing around Portland), when Hard Dream (to be released on Audio Dregs) was released on September 21. Before the album was released, a track from the album, called "Breakfast" was released for download and reviewed by XLR8R and Local Cut, a local Portland music journal. An interview was also conducted by Disco Workout, a music blog, and two more songs were made available for listening. Libman stated in that Disco Workout review that Hard Dream was intended to have a "sort of darker, moodier tone" than previous albums.

== Albums ==
Copy has released four albums on Audio Dregs, and one album on Gold Robot Records. All are produced in an electronic style. Copy calls his music "Electro Disco Pop", and it features many different varieties of software or otherwise synthesizers, commonly layered, along with electronically sequenced drum beats. During his live shows, Copy plays a keytar and sometimes features a live drummer.

=== Mobius Beard ===
Released March 21, 2006.

==== Track list ====
1. A Slight But Delicious Warble (5:10)
2. Just Expect (3:44)
3. Like A Turtle (5:23)
4. Backward (3:55)
5. Calling You Back (3:13)
6. It's A Little Too Late (4:49)
7. Afro Oven (4:18)
8. Plagiarhythm (4:08)
9. Tailored Pants (5:30)
10. Thanks For The Pen (3:48)
11. The Wheel (3:16)

=== Hair Guitar ===
Released April 24, 2007.

==== Track list ====
1. Fist (4:36)
2. This is Promotional (3:29)
3. Assassinator (6:06)
4. Zipper Problems (3:56)
5. Could You Like Her? (3:51)
6. See You Around Maybe (4:11)
7. Actual (4:17)
8. You Can Not Believe It
9. Remembering Florida (4:17)
10. Closet Face (5:18)

=== Hard Dream ===
Released September 21, 2010.

==== Track list ====
1. One Less Time (8:06)
2. Shoots (3:12)
3. Breakfast (5:14)
4. Something (4:26)
5. I Can Smell It (3:22)
6. Real Scared (3:11)
7. It Could Have Been More (5:06)
8. I Didn't Know (3:28)
9. On One Condition (4:43)
10. Stay Away From It (4:39)
11. She Sings Like an American Car (iTunes Bonus Track) (5:34)

=== Chalice Agenda ===
Released May 5, 2015.

==== Track list ====
1. Contraction (3:01)
2. Fan Fiction (4:10)
3. Hard To Care (5:49)
4. Kelvins (3:11)
5. Multiples (3:21)
6. Opportuned (3:18)
7. Perish (3:31)
8. Plantation Vibe (3:12)
9. Tell Me Something New (3:11)
10. To Me (3:57)
11. Why Does It? (3:31)

=== Chosen Atmospheric Pieces ===
Released November 11, 2016.

==== Track list ====
1. Sequel (3:26)
2. Night Terror (4:13)
3. Another Dollar (3:34)
4. August One (3:17)
5. Rose (4:53)
6. A Thing or Two (3:09)
7. We're All Going to Die (4:01)
8. Insideout (3:51)
9. You're An Odd One (3:00)
10. Axel Take 2 (4:04)
11. S is for Cyanide (4:54)

=== Other Releases ===
Copy remixed Ratatat's song "Falcon Jab" for the Japanese release of their album LP3. He also released a two-track LP for The Journal of Popular Noise. Copy's full discography can be viewed on his website or at Discogs. He has been featured on Music (For Robots) and released a song ("Has Your Life Changed") on their second compilation of music they've written about. His track "Playered" was on the BBC's One Life Left compilation Music to Play Games By.

In July 2011, Copy created a SoundCloud page and released two previously unreleased tracks.

== Reviews ==
- Willamette Week (on Hard Dream)
- Dusted Magazine
- Tiny Mix Tapes
- PopMatters
- Music For Robots
- Willamette Week
- Disco Workout
- XLR8R
- Local Cut
