= Magnifique (album) =

Studio album by Ratatat
- Released: July 17, 2015
- Recorded: 2011–2015
- Genres: Electronic rock; neo-psychedelia; electronica; post-rock
- Length: 44:47
- Label: Because Music
- Producers: Evan Mast, Mike Stroud

Ratatat chronology
LP4 (2010)	Magnifique (2015)

Singles from Magnifique
- 1. "Cream on Chrome" Released: April 11, 2015; 2. "Abrasive" Released: June 16, 2015; 3. "Nightclub Amnesia" Released: July 3, 2015

Magnifique is the fifth studio album by Ratatat, released on July 17, 2015. Ratatat began touring in early 2015 with limited stops in the midwestern US and the Coachella music festival where new songs were debuted.

== Background ==
On April 12, 2015, the band released "Cream on Chrome", the first single from the album. On June 16, 2015, "Abrasive" was released as the second single. The album features a cover of the 1971 Springwater single "I Will Return" and cover artwork collage sketches by Evan Mast and Mike Stroud.

== Critical reception ==
Professional ratings
Aggregate scores
Source	Rating
Metacritic	70/100
Review scores
Source	Rating
AllMusic	4/5 stars
The A.V. Club	B+
Clash	(8/10)
Consequence of Sound	B+
Entertainment Weekly	B+
Exclaim!	(8/10)
God Is in the TV	3.5/5 stars
The Guardian	3/5 stars
Pitchfork	(5/10)
PopMatters	(7/10)

Magnifique was met with "generally favorable" reviews from critics. At Metacritic, which assigns a weighted average rating out of 100 to reviews from mainstream publications, this release received an average score of 70, based on 22 reviews.

== Track listing ==
No.	Title	Length
1.	"Intro"	1:01
2.	"Cream on Chrome"	4:15
3.	"Magnifique"	2:51
4.	"Abrasive"	4:16
5.	"Countach"	2:32
6.	"Drift"	3:23
7.	"Pricks of Brightness"	3:08
8.	"Nightclub Amnesia"	6:17
9.	"Cold Fingers"	2:00
10.	"Supreme"	3:00
11.	"Rome"	5:32
12.	"Primetime"	1:58
13.	"I Will Return"	3:59
14.	"Outro"	0:35

== Charts ==
=== Weekly charts ===
Weekly chart performance for Magnifique
Chart (2015)	Peak position
Australian Albums (ARIA)	29
Belgian Albums (Ultratop Flanders)	198
Belgian Albums (Ultratop Wallonia)	89
French Albums (SNEP)	36
UK Dance Albums (Official Charts)	29
UK Independent Albums (Official Charts)	40
US Billboard 200	36
US Independent Albums (Billboard)	6
US Top Dance Albums (Billboard)	1

=== Year-end charts ===
Year-end chart performance for Magnifique
Chart (2015)	Position
US Top Dance/Electronic Albums (Billboard)	22
