= Ratatat Remixes Vol. 2 =

Compilation album (mixtape) by Ratatat
- Released: 2007
- Genre: Hip hop
- Length: 53:35
- Label: Self-released
- Producer: Evan Mast, Mike Stroud

Ratatat chronology
Classics (2006)	Ratatat Remixes Vol. 2 (2007)	LP3 (2008)

Professional ratings
Review scores
Source	Rating
Prefix	(7.0/10)

Ratatat Remixes Vol. 2 is the second self-released remix album by the Brooklyn indie electronic/alternative rock duo Ratatat. It includes performances from hip-hop artists U.G.K., Notorious B.I.G., Jay-Z, Kanye West, Memphis Bleek, and Z-Ro.

== Background ==
Several of the tracks feature beats from the 9 Beats set of leaked demos as their backing music:

- Memphis Bleek's Alright uses beat #1
- Young Buck's Shorty Wanna Ride uses beat #2
- Notorious B.I.G.'s Dead Wrong uses beat #3
- Young Buck, The Game & Ludacris's Stomp uses beat #4
- Slim Thug, Bun B, and T.I.'s 3 Kings uses beat #6

== Track listing ==
1. Young Buck, The Game & Ludacris – "Stomp" – 5:06
2. Notorious B.I.G. – "Party & Bullshit" – 3:55
3. Jay-Z & Notorious B.I.G. – "Allure" – 4:23
4. Z-Ro, Devin the Dude & Juvenile – "The Mule" – 3:55
5. Young Buck – "Shorty Wanna Ride" – 3:50
6. Beanie Sigel & Jay-Z – "Glock Nines" – 4:07
7. Despot – "Freestyle" – 1:38
8. Memphis Bleek – "Alright" – 4:12
9. Slim Thug, T.I. & Bun-B – "Three Kings" – 4:54
10. Young Jeezy & Bun-B – "Over Here" – 4:30
11. Kanye West – "Diamonds" – 3:36
12. Beans – "Freestyle" – 2:23
13. Notorious B.I.G. – "Dead Wrong" – 3:10
14. Saigon & U.G.K. – "We Gon' Ride" – 3:56
