= Ratatat Remixes Vol. 1 =

2004 remix album by Ratatat

Compilation album (mixtape) by Ratatat
- Released: 2004
- Genre: Hip hop
- Label: Self-Released
- Producers: Evan Mast, Mike Stroud

Ratatat chronology
Ratatat (2004)	Ratatat Remixes Vol. 1 (2004)	Classics (2006)

Professional ratings
Review scores
Source	Rating
Glide	positive
Pitchfork	(7/10)
Rolling Stone	positive

Ratatat Remixes Vol. 1 is a self-released remix album by the Brooklyn indie electronic rock duo Ratatat. It includes songs from hip-hop artists Missy Elliott, Kanye West, Raekwon and Ghostface Killah, among others. In an interview with Glide Magazine, Ratatat member Mike Stroud acknowledged both the marked departure from their instrumental first album Ratatat and perceived dichotomous nature of their sound by saying, "Especially with remixes, we approach it a bit differently than our other music. It's something we originally did for fun, that's now part of what we are."

== Track listing ==
1. Ratatat/Brooklyn Zoo – "Intro"
2. Beanie Sigel & Dirt McGirt – "When You Hear That"
3. Missy Elliott – "Hot" (WEA/Elektra)
4. Raekwon – "Smith Bros."
5. Kanye West – "Get Em High" (Def Jam)
6. G-Unit – "Stunt 101" (Interscope)
7. Dizzee Rascal – "Fix Up" (XL)
8. Method Man & Buddha Monk of Brooklyn Zoo – "PLO Style"
9. Lazer Life of Brooklyn Zoo – "Freestyle"
10. Raekwon & Ghostface Killah – "Cutting It Up"
11. L.O.X. – "Dirty Ryders"
12. Jay-Z – "Sunshine" (Roc-A-Fella)
13. Missy Elliott – "Wake Up" (WEA/Elektra)
14. Ghostface Killah & Jadakiss – "Run" (Def Jam)
