= Seventeen Years =

Seventeen Years may refer to:

- Seventeen Years (film), a 1999 Chinese film
- Seventeen Years (song), a song by Ratatat
