= Scantlebury =

Scantlebury is an English surname originating from the West Country, and most likely from Devon and Cornwall.

The Oxford Dictionary of Surnames gives the origin of Scantlebury as:

"English (West Country) of unknown origin perhaps a habitation name from Kentisbury or Kentisbeare both found in Devon with an added "S". Both villages can be found in the Domesday Book. Kentisbury in South Devon near Cullompton is spelt Chentesberie in the Domesday Book, Kentelesbere in 1240 and Kentesbyire in 1252 in Fleet Fines. Kentisbury in North Devon spelt Chentesberie in the Domesday Book Kentelesberi in 1260 and Kentelesberi in 1275."

Recorded variations and spellings of Scantlebury include Skentbewe (1561), Skentelbewe (1690), Skentlebury (1649), Skantilbew (1575), Skentlebewe (1612), Scentilbewy (1601), Scantlebewe (1622), Skentelbury (1785), and Scantlebury (1809).

The earliest parish record of a Scantlebury was the marriage of Thomas, son of John Skantilbew, and Mary, daughter of Andrew Pale, in the parish church of Lanreath in Cornwall.

The following extracts from the parish register of East Greenwich, Kent, record the births of seven children to the same Scantlebury family, although each child had its surname spelt differently:

- "29 June 1789 Cantelbury Jane, daughter of Walter and Sarah"
- "18 October 1790 Canterbury Elizabeth, daughter of Walter and Sarah"
- "20 May 1793 Scantelbury William son of Walter and Sarah"
- "11 August 1794 Scantelbury Charles son of Walter and Sarah"
- "6 August 1795 Scanterberry Ann daughter of Walter and Sarah"
- "17 September 1798 Scanterburry John son of Walter and Sarah"
- "13 October 1802 Scantalbury Richard son of Walter and Sarah"

Walter's occupation was given as "Collegeman", he was a resident at the Greenwich Naval Hospital, and originally from Cornwall.

== People ==
- Ann Scantlebury, British radio personality
- Glen Scantlebury (born 1955), American film director and screenwriter
- Jeremy Scantlebury, New Zealand sailor
- Lilian Avis Scantlebury (1894–1964), Australian Red Cross worker
- Neil Sebastian Scantlebury (born 1965), Barbadian priest
- Pat Scantlebury (1917–1991), Panamanian baseball player
- Peter Scantlebury (born 1963), British basketball player and coach
- Roger Scantlebury (born 1936), British computer scientist, who developed packet-switching in the late 1960s at the NPL in north-east Surrey
- Velma Scantlebury (born 1955), American transplant surgeon
- Vera Scantlebury Brown (1889–1946), Australian pediatrician
- Victor Scantlebury (1945–2020), Anglican bishop

== See also ==
- Scantlebury Skate Park
