= Lovegety =

Proximity matchmaking device

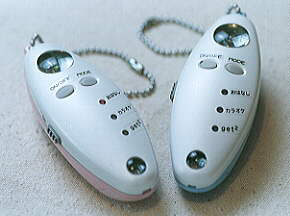
- Lovegety devices
- Type: Proximity matchmaking device
- Inception: February 1998
- Manufacturer: Erfolg Co., Ltd.

Lovegety was a proximity matchmaking device introduced in Feb. 1998 in Japan by Erfolg Co., Ltd., which allowed users to find potential dates that matched their personal preferences in the vicinity. Over 1,300,000 of these units were sold in Japan for the price of 2,980 yen per unit.

It was the first proximity dating device, and "the first commercial attempt to move introduction systems away from the desktop and into reality". As such, it was an important precursor for other location-based social networking applications such as Nokia's Bluetooth-based Nokia Sensor, and more recent geolocation-based social applications such as StreetSpark.

There were three modes users could pre-select on the Lovegety device which reflected the mood they were currently in and hence what kind of partner they were looking for. These included “let’s just chat”, “let’s go sing some karaoke” and “get2” or "looking for love" modes. The devices could be set to interact with each other when a potential mate was within close proximity (15 feet) or to simply notify a user of others who are currently set to the same mood.

== See also ==
- Online dating
- StreetPass
- Toothing
