= Rex Records =

Rex Records may refer to:

- Rex Records (1912), a United States-based company
- Rex Records (1933), a United Kingdom-based company selling through Marks & Spencer department stores
- Rex Records (1957), a United States-based company in Holyoke, Massachusetts
- Rex Records (1965), a United Kingdom-based company established to serve the Irish market
- Rex Records (2001), a United Kingdom-based company

== See also ==
- R.E.X. Records
