= Ste Curran =

British journalist

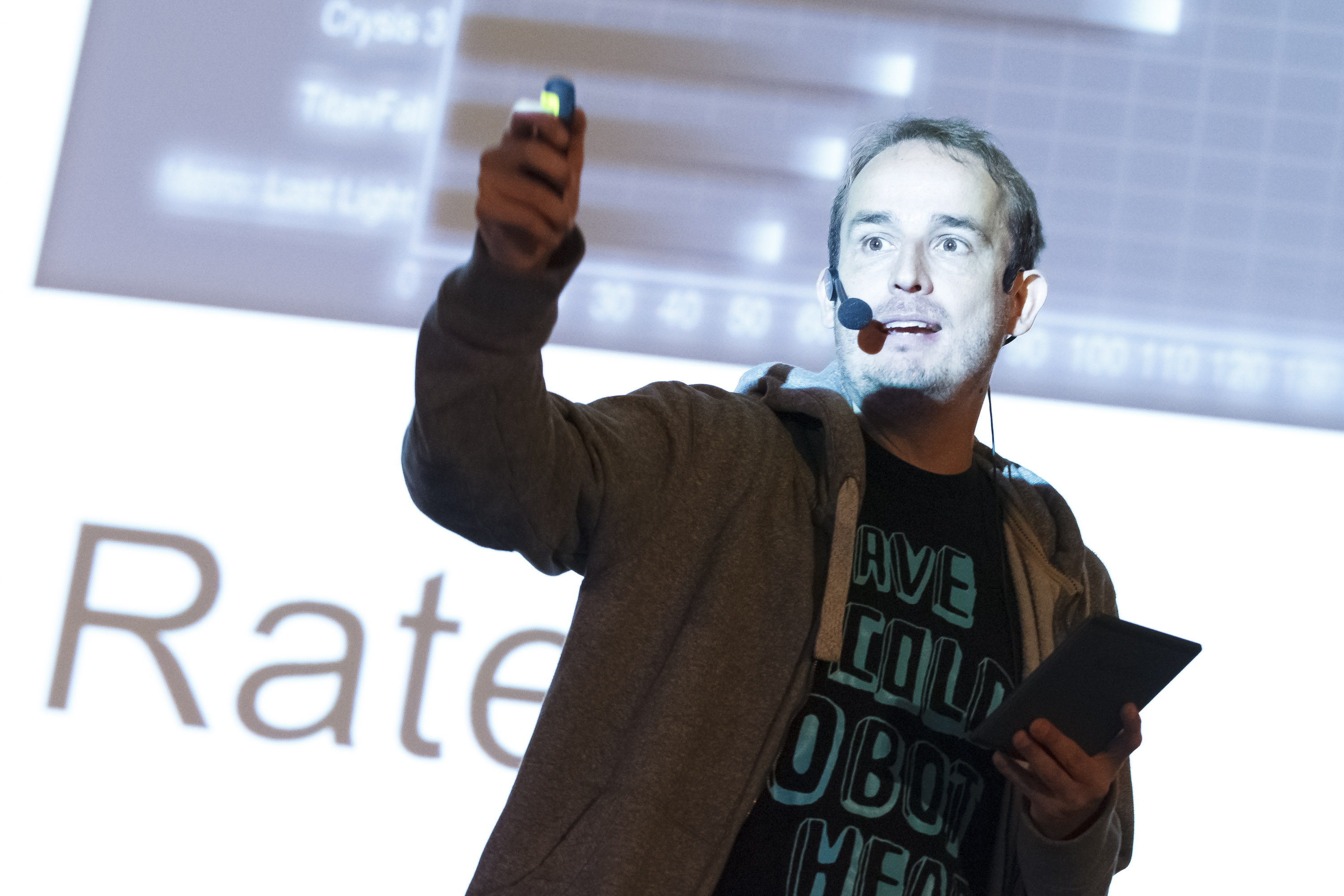
Curran at Game Developers Conference Europe 2014

Stephen Curran is a British video game journalist, presenter, author, tutor and game designer.

He was an editor at Edge magazine, also as one of the contributors writing under the name RedEye. The RedEye articles have been cited as one of "Ten unmissable examples of New Games Journalism" by Guardian Unlimited.

Curran's published books include Game Plan: Great Designs That Changed the Face of Computer Gaming (2004), The Art of Producing Games (2005), The Complete Guide to Game Development, Art & Design (2005) and Game On: The 50 Greatest Video Games of All Time (2006); the latter three were written with David McCarthy and Simon Byron.

He currently presents the Resonance FM gaming radio show, One Life Left.

Curran is credited with writing the script to Sega's PSP title, Crush, with British video game journalist Simon Parkin.

In 2004, Curran fabricated a fad called "Toothing", in which users of bluetooth cellphones were supposed to send suggestive anonymous solicitations to others within range. He registered a forum, filling it with posts from fictional users, and linked it to Gizmodo, a gadget blog. BBC, Reuters and Wired news desks all fell for the hoax.

Curran was a speaker at the Nordic Game Conference and Career Expo in 2008.

Curran recently started a blog called 'Consumer Writes' (a play on 'consumer rights'), in which he writes 'overwritten objections' - bizarre and unusual complaint letters to various companies in the hope of getting free stuff.
