= Rex Records (1912) =

- Parent company: Rex Talking Machine Corporation
- Founded: 1912
- Defunct: 1919
- Country of origin: United States
- Location: Wilmington, Delaware

Rex Records was a United States–based record label owned by the Rex Talking Machine Corporation of Wilmington, Delaware. The company was in business from 1912 through 1919. They issued vertical cut double-sided ten- and 12-inch diameter disc records compatible with the Pathé Records system. They were bought out by Okeh Records. For further details and references see mainspringress.com. That article cites "1918 issues of 'Talking Machine World'" as a specific source for remarks about Rex Records.

== See also ==
- List of record labels
- Rex Records (disambiguation)
