= Melodica Men =

YouTube channel created by Joe Buono and Tristan Clarke

- Born: Joe Buono Tristan Clarke

YouTube information
- Channel: Melodica Men
- Years active: 2016–2020
- Genres: Music; comedy
- Subscribers: 500 thousand
- Views: 91 million
- Last updated: 2 May 2023

Melodica Men is a YouTube channel created by Joe Buono and Tristan Clarke, who perform an eclectic mix of music as melodica duets.

== History ==
Their first viral hit was a performance of Igor Stravinsky's Rite of Spring in September 2016, gaining 1.5 million views in a single day. Their repertoire includes Bizet, Tchaikovsky and Gershwin as well as music from Star Wars and Queen. They have performed as soloists with the Jacksonville and Atlanta Symphonies and have appeared on ABC's The Gong Show and NBC's America's Got Talent.

Commentary about the channel notes the pair's musicianship and versatility. Clarke, an alumnus of the Juilliard School, is principal trumpet with the Jacksonville Symphony and Buono, also a brass player, who has masters' degrees from Peabody Conservatory, is a teacher and composer. They have developed their own model of Melodica, the MM37.

On 23 August 2020, an update was sent to Melodica Men Patreons, stating that the two would be focusing on touring performances with orchestras as well as music education activities, and that no further videos were likely.
