= Rex Records (2001) =

Rex Records label formed in 2001

The most recent record label to use the name Rex Records was started in 2001 as an off-shot of XL Recordings. Overall, it was an experiment releasing demo recordings from more left field artists. The label was the original home of Australian artists The Avalanches and The Vines, and has also released the single Seventeen Years by Ratatat.

== See also ==
- List of record labels
- Rex Records (disambiguation)
