= LP4 (album) =

Studio album by Ratatat
- Released: June 8, 2010
- Recorded: 2008–2010
- Studios: Old Soul Studios in New York City; Glassworks Studios in Manhattan
- Genres: Electronica; art rock; experimental hip hop; neo-psychedelia; instrumental hip hop; post-rock
- Length: 42:43
- Label: XL
- Producers: Evan Mast, Mike Stroud

Ratatat chronology
LP3 (2008)	LP4 (2010)	Magnifique (2015)

Singles from LP4
- 1. "Party with Children" Released: 2010; 2. "Drugs" Released: 2010

LP4 (or LP4: Let Your Bird Eat Its Beak) is the fourth studio album by Ratatat, released on June 8, 2010. The name comes from the acronym for long play (LP), as it is their fourth album. It is similarly titled to their third release, LP3. A majority of the tracks are from the same studio session as their previous album.

== Background ==
The album largely features material produced during the session of Ratatat's previous album LP3, recorded at Old Soul Studios in New York City. Evan Mast of the duo stated, "A lot of the sounds and palettes are similar, but I think the songs change pretty drastically." Ratatat had purchased several Middle Eastern percussion instruments, which are featured in LP4. The album also features a string quartet, whereas previous Ratatat albums had used a Mellotron. The string sections were recorded at Glassworks Studios in Manhattan. Music videos were produced for the tracks "Drugs", "Mahalo" "Neckbrace", and "Party With Children". The album contains numerous spoken word samples, including a line from Werner Herzog's 1977 film Stroszek segueing "Bilar" and "Drugs".

== Reception ==
Professional ratings
Aggregate scores
Source	Rating
Metacritic	68/100
Review scores
Source	Rating
AllMusic	4/5 stars
The Music Cycle	5/5 stars
Pitchfork Media	(5.2/10)
SPIN Magazine	3.5/5 stars

The album debuted on the Billboard 200 at #66 selling 6,700 copies in its first week.

== Track listing ==
1. "Bilar" – 4:14
2. "Drugs" – 4:55
3. "Neckbrace" – 4:06
4. "We Can't Be Stopped" – 2:10
5. "Bob Gandhi" – 4:01
6. "Mandy" – 3:42
7. "Mahalo" – 2:02
8. "Party with Children" – 2:58
9. "Sunblocks" – 3:42
10. "Bare Feast" – 2:38
11. "Grape Juice City" – 3:56
12. "Alps" – 4:21

iTunes pre-order bonus track

13. "Biddang" – 3:21

== Charts ==
=== Weekly charts ===
Weekly chart performance for LP4
Chart (2010)	Peak position
Canadian Albums (Nielsen SoundScan)	72
Greek Albums (IFPI)	23
UK Dance Albums (Official Charts)	33
US Billboard 200	65
US Independent Albums (Billboard)	7
US Top Dance Albums (Billboard)	3

=== Year-end charts ===
Year-end chart performance for LP4
Chart (2010)	Position
US Dance/Electronic Albums (Billboard)	24
