= Classics (Ratatat album) =

Studio album by Ratatat
- Released: August 22, 2006
- Recorded: November 2003 – March 2006
- Genres: Indie rock; electronica; neo-psychedelia; experimental rock
- Length: 42:31
- Label: XL
- Producers: Evan Mast, Mike Stroud

Ratatat chronology
Ratatat Remixes Vol. 1 (2004)	Classics (2006)	Ratatat Remixes Vol. 2 (2007)

Singles from Classics
- 1. "Wildcat" Released: July 25, 2006; 2. "Lex" Released: October 30, 2006; 3. "Loud Pipes" Released: 2007

Professional ratings
Aggregate scores
Source	Rating
Metacritic	69/100
Review scores
Source	Rating
AllMusic	4/5 stars
Pitchfork	6.0/10

Classics is the second album from Ratatat, released on August 22, 2006. As with their first album, Classics is almost entirely instrumental, with the only exception being a large cat-like sound sample used in "Wildcat" and the "Woo!" exclamation in the climax of "Nostrand".

During a September 15, 2006 interview on radio station KEXP, the band revealed that part of the album was recorded in upstate New York in a house owned by Björk.

This album produced three singles: "Lex", "Wildcat", and "Loud Pipes".

The track "Tropicana" was featured in the 2007 film Knocked Up and "Loud Pipes" was featured in the video game MLB 07: The Show.

The track "Nostrand" was featured in a music video called "Typolution".

== Track listing ==
No.	Title	Length
1.	"Montanita"	5:02
2.	"Lex"	4:30
3.	"Gettysburg"	5:28
4.	"Wildcat"	4:21
5.	"Tropicana"	4:37
6.	"Loud Pipes"	3:47
7.	"Kennedy"	3:35
8.	"Swisha"	3:50
9.	"Nostrand"	3:05
10.	"Tacobel Canon"	4:29
11.	"Truman" (iTunes Store album only)	3:30
