= Ann Scantlebury =

Ann Scantlebury is a radio show presenter and actress.

Scantlebury currently co-presents the video game radio show One Life Left, on Resonance FM. For this role, she was listed in trade magazine MCV as one of 2009's "rising stars" of the UK games industry.

Her theatre roles include the Queen Mary Theatre Company's play Speaker's Corner, during the 2006 Edinburgh Festival. In 2009 she was awarded the Silver World Medal in the Best Drama Special category at the New York Festivals Radio Programming and Promotion Awards for her radio drama "And Then She Was Gone".
