= One Life Left =

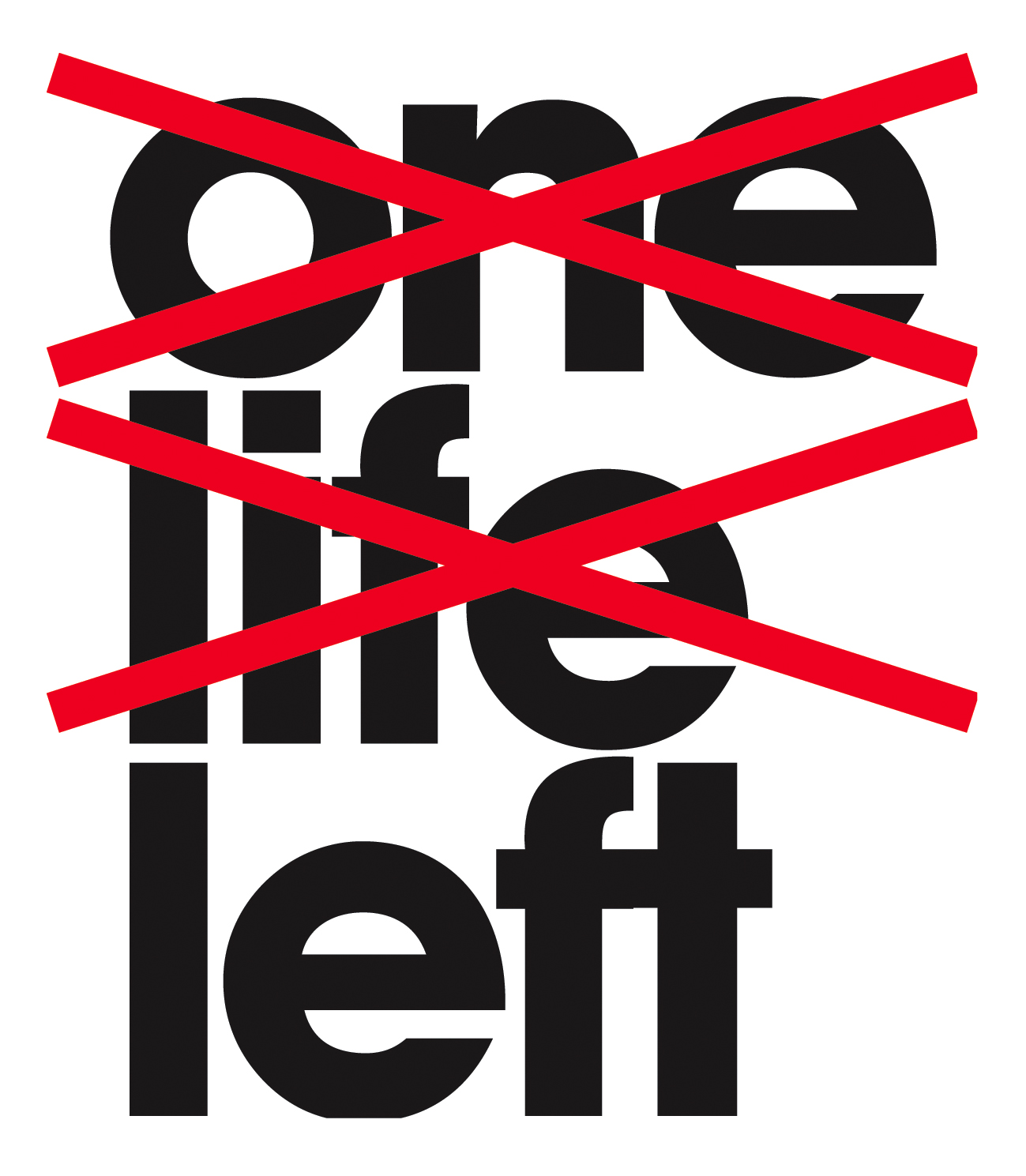
- Other names: OLL
- Genre: Video gaming
- Running time: 60 minutes
- Country of origin: United Kingdom
- Home station: Resonance FM
- Hosted by: Ste Curran; Simon Byron; Ann Scantlebury
- Original release: 2006 – present
- No. of series: 8
- No. of episodes: 545 (as of 5th June 2024)
- Website: http://www.onelifeleft.com/
- Podcast: http://onelifeleft.libsyn.com/rss

One Life Left is Europe's first and only dedicated videogame FM radio show. It is presented by Ste Curran, Simon Byron and Ann Scantlebury. Earlier host Robert Howells stopped appearing on the show, to be later replaced by Simon. It includes news, reviews, features, competitions and a weekly studio guest. One Life Left is broadcast on Resonance FM, a London community radio station at 19:00 every Monday, and is available as a podcast.

== Guests and features ==
One Life Left is presented in a magazine style, with guests and features. Guests have included industry figures such as Jon Hare, Charles Cecil, Paul Rose and comedian and presenter Joe Cornish. Features range from comedy sketches (for example, Craig 'The Rage' McClelland's video game poetry and Ms. Snac-Man's "gaming recipes") to views from the industry (for example, Derek Williams' Free Market Economy, from the perspective of a market stall owner) and game reviews (for example Talia Reviews Nintendo Games Because They Are For Kids). The show briefly featured a segment by Ariel Angelotti during her tenure at Q Games, which highlighted Japanese development culture and popular Japanese phrases.

Since 2009, the show has featured contributions from "Dr. Avatar" who presents an Accident & Emergency segment highlighting the misfortune of classic video game characters. Other additions to the complement of features have been Science Officer's Log which parodies the gaming trope of recorded audio logs, and Lonely Hearts by Cara Ellison which involves the generation of dating website profiles for famous game characters.

One Life Left has also recorded from the Develop Conference and Expo. In 2010, they hosted One Laugh Left as part of Nottingham Gamecity 5. This was billed as a night of stand up comedy about video gaming and included turns from each of the three presenters.

== Critical reaction ==
The video games website Kotaku considered One Life Left to be "a sweet blend of light-hearted discussion, music, interviews and ridiculous features", pointing out its uniqueness in gaming and in radio. Guardian Unlimited's Aleks Krotoski and Keith Stuart have both commented on the quality of the show's podcasts.

One Life Left was nominated for the "Best Games Podcast" category both the 2007 and 2008 Games Media Awards, and in 2009, won the GMA "Best Podcast/Broadcast" award.

One Life Left was considered one of the ten best podcasts by thelondonpaper.

== Music to Play Games By ==
In December 2008, One Life Left released Music to Play Games By, a compilation CD of music inspired by video games. It was arranged by Simon Parkin and produced by Andrew Smillie. The album covers various videogame themes and styles, and has been described as "chip-indie". Kotaku considered the album to be an excellent collection of "chiptunes, remixes, even normal songs that are just written about games."

== Maraoke: Modded Karaoke ==
One Life Left also operates a karaoke show called Maraoke (short for Modded Karaoke), hosted by Curran, in which the lyrics to popular songs are adjusted to be about video games. The show is hosted at gaming conventions all across Europe, with the occasional standalone gig being hosted in London. The show was originally called Marioke before changing its name in 2019 to avoid potential legal trouble with Nintendo. Maraoke was featured on The Yogscast's Christmas charity live stream, Jingle Jam, in 2023 and 2024.
