= Ratatat =

American electronic rock duo

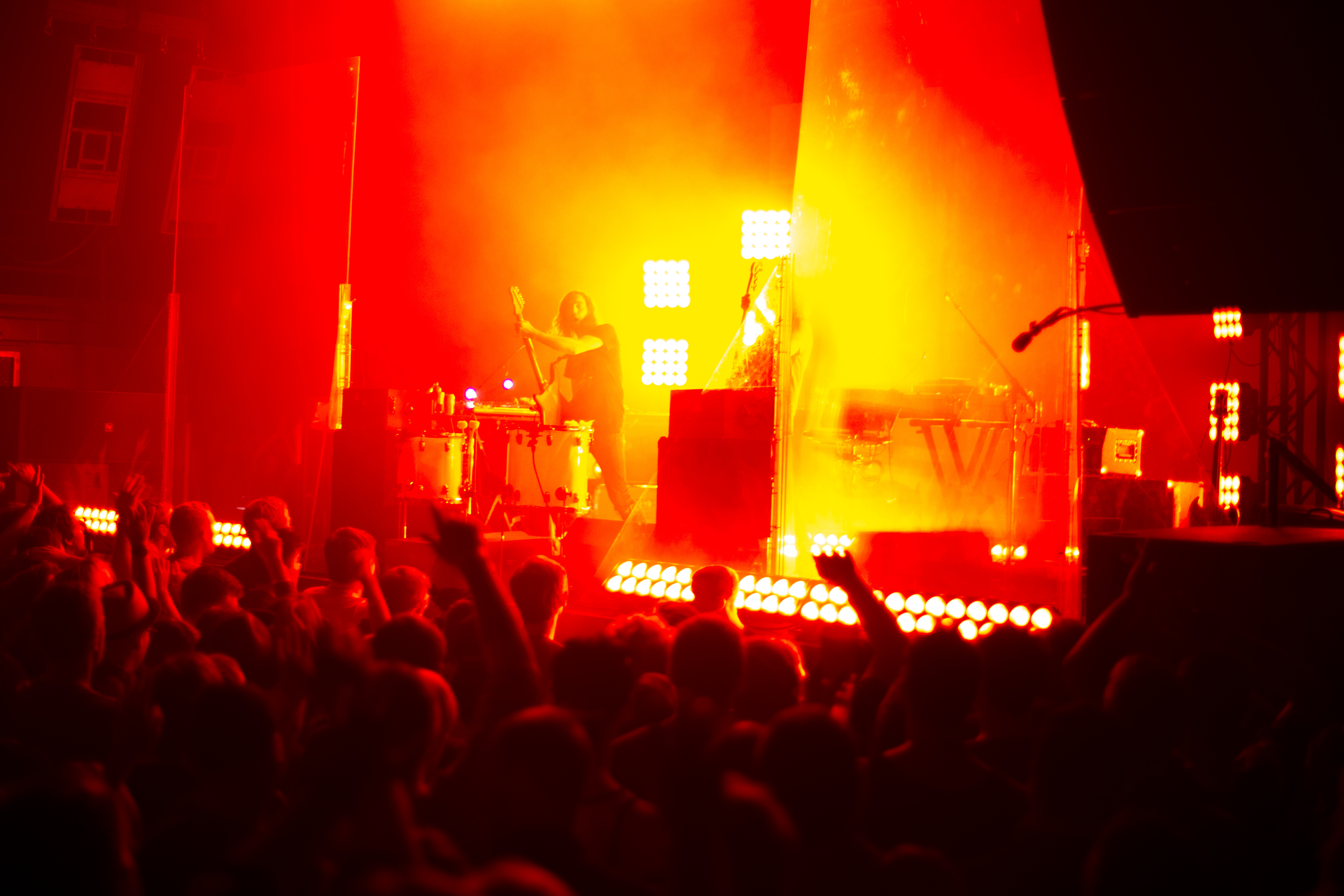
- Ratatat performing in 2014 at First Avenue in Minneapolis, MN

Background information
- Origin: Brooklyn, New York, U.S.
- Genre: Electronic rock
- Years active: 2001–present
- Labels: XL; Rex; Audio Dregs
- Spinoffs: Kunzite
- Members: Evan Mast; Mike Stroud
- Website: www.ratatatmusic.com

Ratatat (/ˈrætətæt/ RAT-ə-tat) is an American electronic rock duo consisting of Mike Stroud (guitar, melodica, synthesizers, percussion) and producer Evan Mast (bass, synthesizers, percussion).

== History ==
=== Beginnings (2001–2005) ===
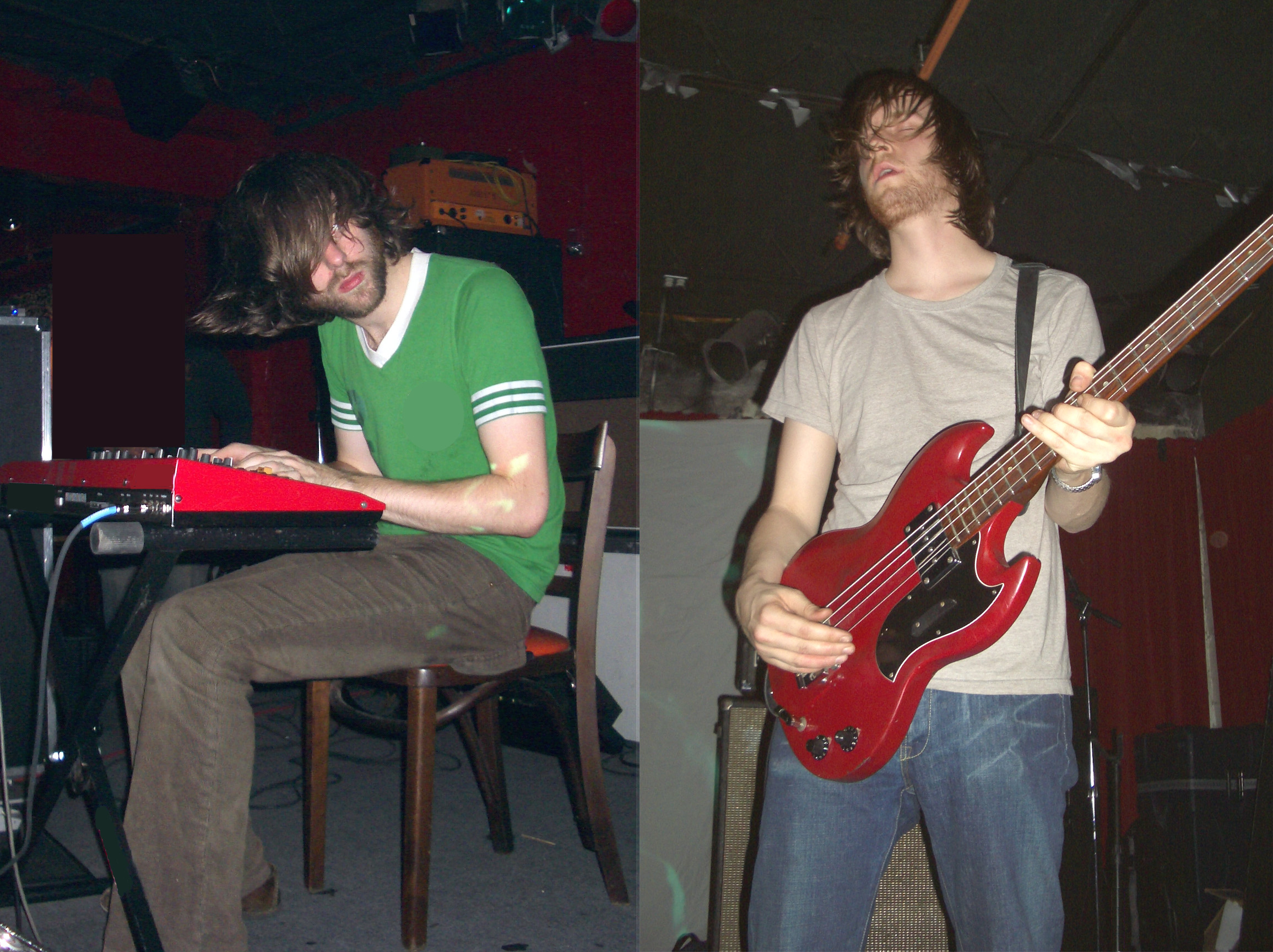
Ratatat performing in 2004

Evan Mast and Mike Stroud first met as students at Skidmore College. They started working together in 2001, recording several songs under the name "Cherry". Stroud had previously toured with Dashboard Confessional in 2000.

Ratatat debuted in 2003 with the release of the single "Seventeen Years" on Mast's and his brother Eric's (E*Rock) record label Audio Dregs in the US and Rex Records in the UK. Mike Stroud had been a touring member of Ben Kweller's band, but he "had enough" by 2003 and, after two years of touring, left the band after appearing on their second album, On My Way (released in 2004). Having signed for XL Recordings, Ratatat released their self-titled debut album, Ratatat and the single "Germany to Germany". The album was written and recorded in Mast's Crown Heights, Brooklyn apartment on his laptop. It is entirely instrumental with the exception of vocal excerpts at the beginning and end of select tracks.

In the following year, Ratatat supported the band Interpol on their tour. Also in 2004, Ratatat released Ratatat Remixes Vol. 1 in co-operation with Audio Dregs, a compilation of remixed tracks by other artists, thereby garnering the attention of Rolling Stone.

=== Second album, Classics (2006–2008) ===
On August 22, 2006, Ratatat released their second album entitled Classics on XL Recordings.

On October 6, 2006, Ratatat became the first band to perform a public show inside the Guggenheim Museum in New York City.

On October 10, 2006, a new demo album from Ratatat titled 9 Beats was leaked online. This set of tracks does not appear on any official discography listings. 9 Beats was not an official album, the tracks consist of short instrumental electronic musical pieces and demos for their next mixtape. In 2007, this release was followed by their second volume of remixed tracks, Ratatat Remixes Vol. 2.

=== Third album, LP3 (2008–2009) ===
Leading up to the release of Ratatat's third album LP3 on July 8, 2008, their official website showed the videos of the first three singles. "Shiller", "Shempi" and then "Mirando" have all been released on 7" or 12" singles. "Shiller", the first to be released, featured a special B-side, the track "Mahalo" which was later also included on the fourth album, LP4.

In 2008, it was rumored that they would be signed by Star Trak Entertainment as the understudies of The Neptunes.

Ratatat contributed two songs to Man on the Moon: The End of Day, the debut album by alternative rapper Kid Cudi released September 15, 2009: "Alive (Nightmare)" and "Pursuit of Happiness", the latter of which also featured MGMT. Cudi and Ratatat performed "Pursuit of Happiness" together on Late Show with David Letterman on September 11, 2009.

=== Fourth album, LP4 (2010–2014) ===
According to Mike Stroud in an interview with Paste Magazine released on August 4, 2009, "most of [LP4] was recorded during the same studio sessions that yielded LP3". Ratatat's fourth album, LP4, was released on June 8, 2010, via XL Recordings.

In 2010, Ratatat supported Vampire Weekend on their UK tour at The Brighton Centre and Alexandra Palace. Meanwhile, their song Neckbrace was used in the ski film "The Way I See It" by Matchstick Productions. In 2011, their track "Mirando" was used in Prada's SS2011 ad campaign.

In August 2011, Ratatat was featured in the song "Red Alert" on CSS's new album La Liberación.

On September 29, 2012, Kid Cudi confirmed that Ratatat would be featured and producing on his upcoming third studio album Indicud, however the collaboration didn't make the final cut after Kid Cudi decided to produce the whole album by himself, with the exception of an additional production by Hit-Boy on the track "Red Eye" featuring Haim.

In May 2013, they entered the Austrian Singlecharts after the Austrian network provider A1 used "Loud Pipes" for a radio advertisement.

=== Fifth album, Magnifique (2015–present) ===
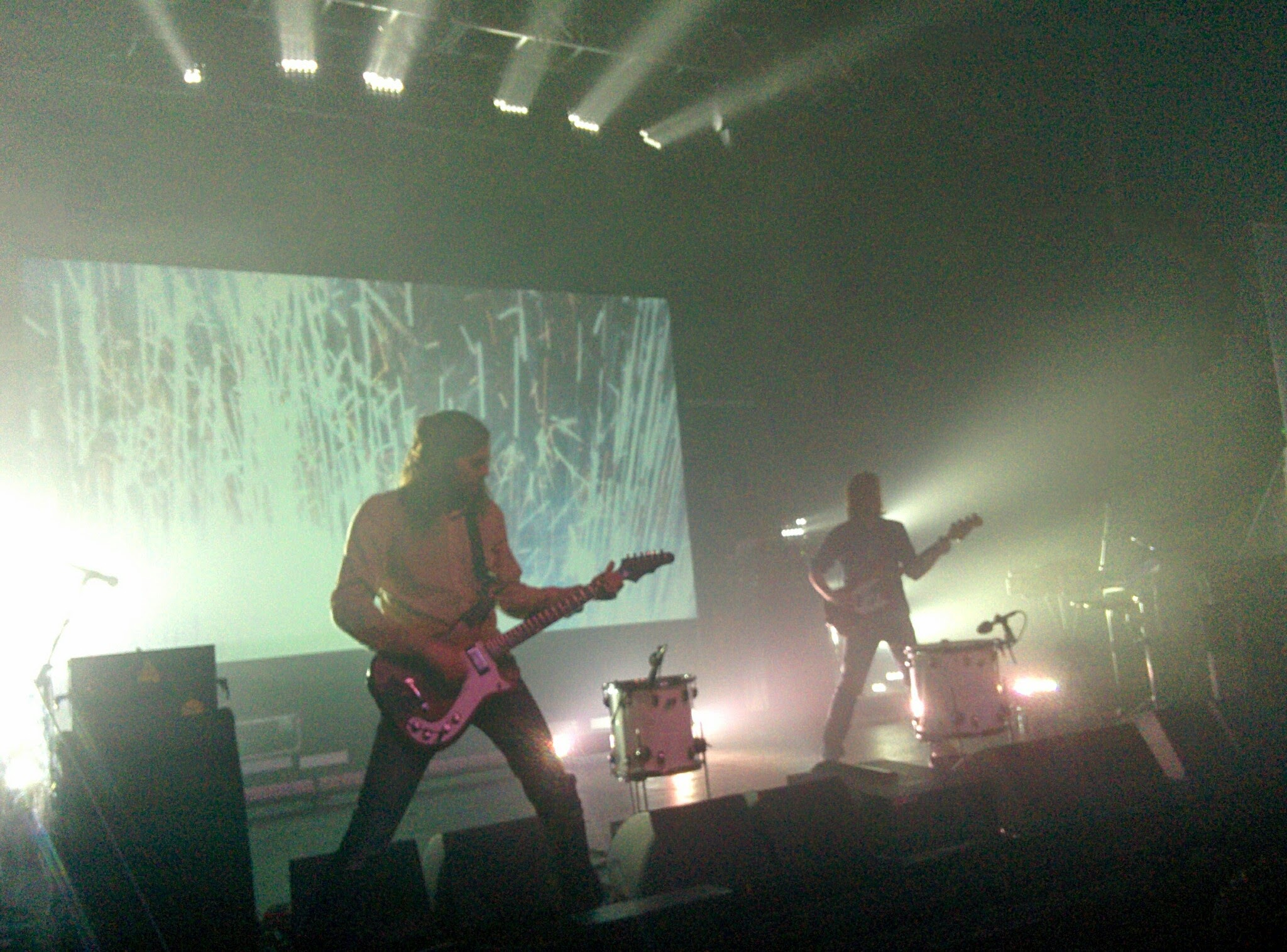
Ratatat at the Fox Theater in Pomona, promoting Magnifique, on April 15, 2015.

The band played Coachella Festival and Governor's Ball Music Festival in 2015. They debuted their new song "Cream On Chrome" just a few hours before their night-ending Coachella set on April 11, 2015. The band also played a concert in Pomona, California on April 15, 2015, and at Primavera Sound in Barcelona in May.

In May 2015, the band announced that their fifth album, Magnifique, would be released on July 17, 2015, and feature a cover of the 1971 Springwater single "I Will Return".

The first single from the album, "Cream on Chrome", was voted number 52 in the Triple J Hottest 100 of 2015, held in January 2016. This is their second appearance on the annual countdown run by the Australian radio station, after featuring on Kid Cudi's "Pursuit of Happiness", which polled 33rd in the 2009 countdown.

== Live performances ==
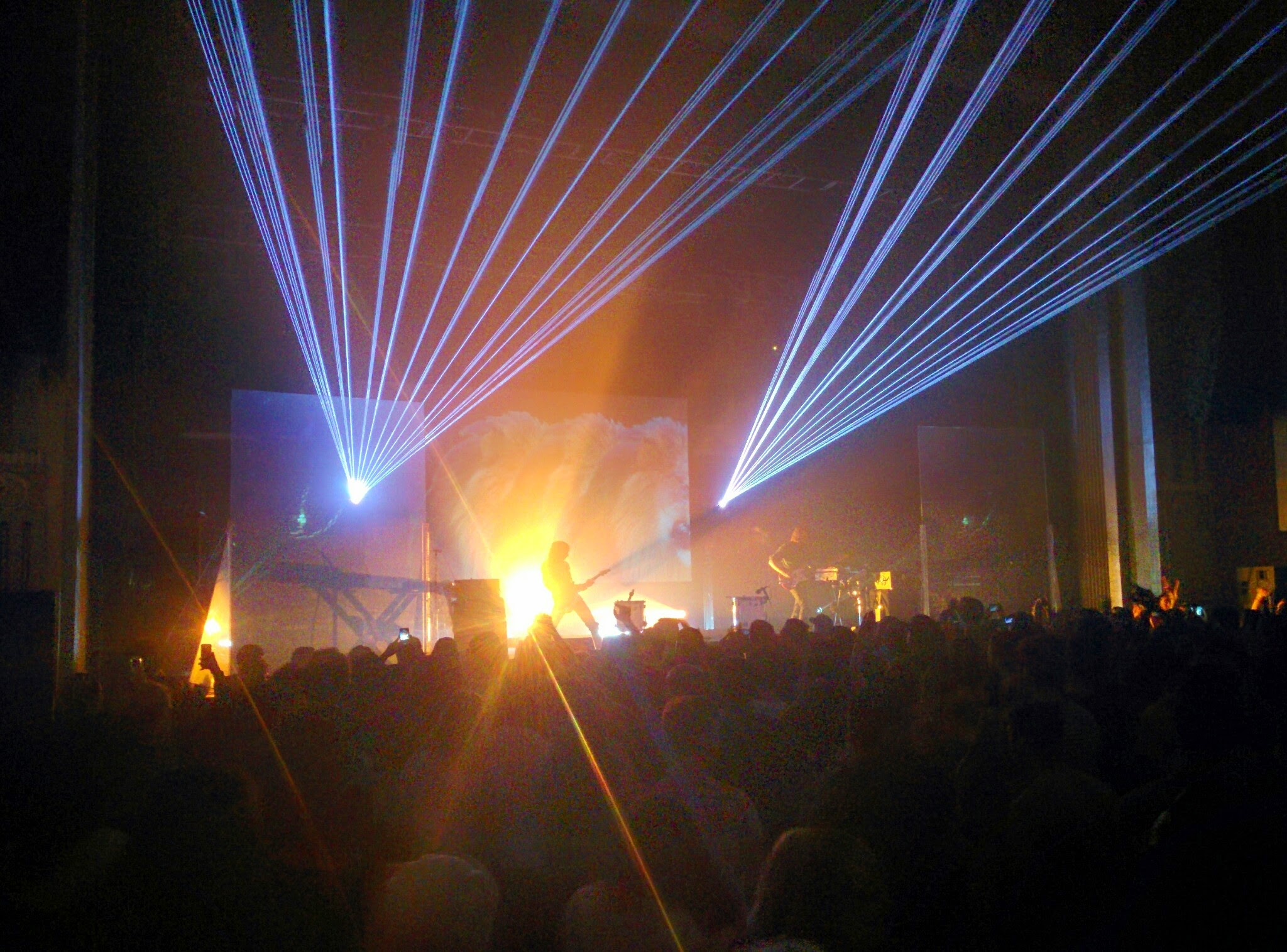
A laser light show as part of a live Ratatat performance in 2015.

Ratatat's live performances bear strong similarities to the performances of the psychedelic rock bands out of San Francisco in the 1960s, with energetic light shows, swirling colors projected onto a screen, and clips of movies thrown in. Evan Mast creates and edits the videos that are projected on the screen. Many of them are included on their YouTube account.

Ratatat has toured with acts such as Björk, Daft Punk, Vampire Weekend, Mouse on Mars, Franz Ferdinand, CSS, the Faint, Super Furry Animals, Clinic, Panther, and the Killers.

== Discography ==
=== Studio albums ===
List of albums, with selected chart positions
Title	Album details	Peak chart positions									
Title	Album details	US	US Dance	US Indie	AUS	BEL (FL)	BEL (WA)	CAN	FRA	UK Dance	UK Indie
Ratatat	Released: April 20, 2004; Label: XL	—	—	—	—	—	—	—	—	—	—
Classics	Released: August 22, 2006; Label: XL	— (Note: Classics did not enter the US Billboard 200, but peaked at number 30 on the Top Heatseekers Albums Chart.)	—	34	—	—	—	—	—	—	—
LP3	Released: July 8, 2008; Label: XL	82	2	9	—	—	—	—	—	—	—
LP4	Released: June 8, 2010; Label: XL	65	3	7	—	—	—	—	—	33	—
Magnifique	Released: July 17, 2015; Label: XL (US), Because (EU)	36	1	6	29	198	89	16	36	29	40
"—" denotes a recording that did not chart or was not released in that territory.

=== Remix albums ===
List of remix albums
Title	Album details
Ratatat Remixes Vol. 1	Released: 2004; Label: Self-released
Ratatat Remixes Vol. 2	Released: 2007; Label: Self-released

=== Singles ===
==== As lead artist ====
Single	Year	Peak chart positions						Certifications	Album
Single	Year	US Sales	US Dance	AUT	FRA	MEX Air.	UK Indie	Certifications	Album
"Seventeen Years"	2003	—	—	—	—	—	—		Ratatat
"Cherry"	2004	—	—	—	—	—	—		Ratatat
"Wildcat"	2006	—	—	—	—	—	—		Classics
"Lex"	2006	—	—	—	—	—	—		Classics
"Loud Pipes"	2007	—	—	72	—	—	—	RIAA: Gold	Classics
"Shiller"	2008	—	—	—	—	—	47		LP3
"Shempi"	2008	—	—	—	—	—	—		LP3
"Mirando"	2009	45	—	—	—	—	—		LP3
"Party with Children"	2010	—	—	—	—	25	—		LP4
"Drugs"	2010	—	—	—	—	—	—		LP4
"Cream on Chrome"	2015	—	38	—	63	—	—		Magnifique
"Abrasive"	2015	—	—	—	200	—	—		Magnifique
"Nightclub Amnesia"	2015	—	—	—	—	—	—		Magnifique
"—" denotes a recording that did not chart or was not released in that territory.

==== As featured artist ====
Single	Year	Peak chart positions										Certifications	Album
Single	Year	US	AUS	AUT	BEL (FL)	BEL (WA)	CAN	FRA	IRL	SWI	UK	Certifications	Album
"Look Alive" (Despot featuring Ratatat)	2009	—	—	—	—	—	—	—	—	—	—		Definitive Jux Presents IV
"Pursuit of Happiness" (Kid Cudi featuring Ratatat and MGMT)	2009	59	41	46	9	3	76	2	24	39	64	RIAA: Diamond; ARIA: Platinum; BEA: Gold; BPI: 2× Platinum; BVMI: Gold	Man on the Moon: The End of Day
"Alive (Nightmare)" (Kid Cudi featuring Ratatat)	2009	—	—	—	—	—	—	—	—	—	—		Man on the Moon: The End of Day
"Red Alert" (CSS featuring Ratatat)	2011	—	—	—	—	—	—	—	—	—	—		La Liberación
"—" denotes a recording that did not chart or was not released in that territory.

=== Remixes ===
Year	Artist	Title
2005	Shout Out Louds	"The Comeback" (Big Slippa Remix by Ratatat)
2006	The Knife	"We Share Our Mothers' Health" (Ratatat Remix)
2006	Biz Markie	"Vapors" (Remix by Ratatat)
2007	Television Personalities	"You Kept Me Waiting Too Long" (Ratatat Remix)
2008	Björk	"Wanderlust" (Ratatat Remix)
2008	The Notorious B.I.G.	"Party and Bullshit" (Ratatat Remix)
