= Melodica =

Free-reed instrument

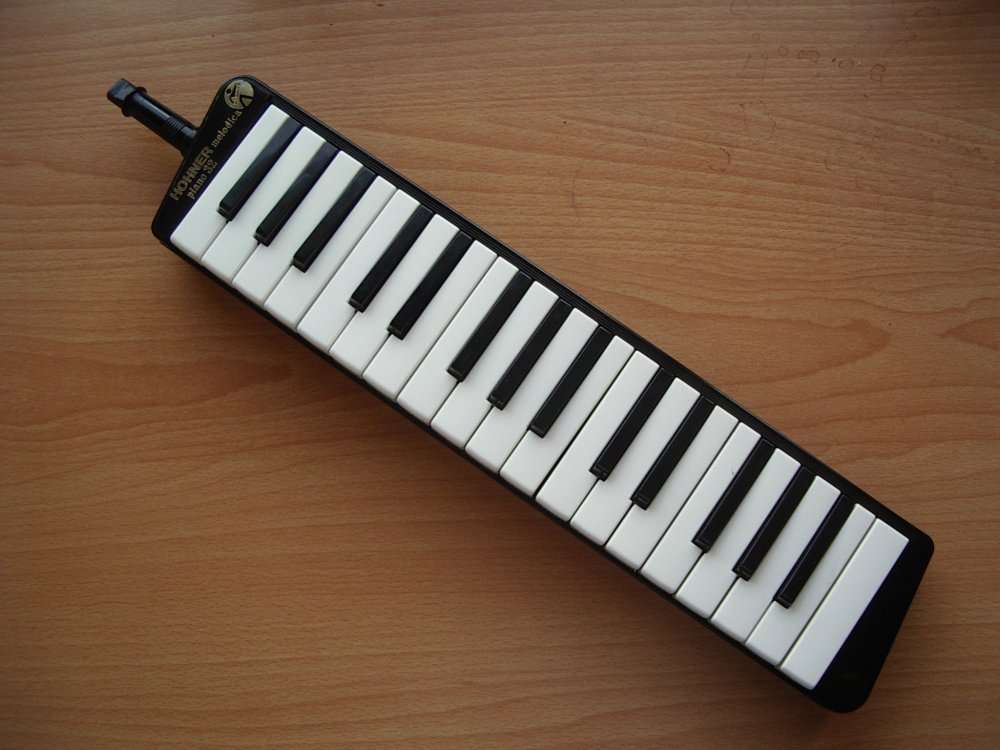
- Hohner melodica

Keyboard instrument
- Classification: Wind; free reed aerophone
- Hornbostel–Sachs classification: 412.132 (Free-reed aerophone)
- Developed: 1950s

Playing range
- Usually 2 or 3 octaves

Related instruments
- accordion, harmonica, pump organ, yu

The melodica is a handheld free reed instrument similar in sound to a pump organ, harmonica, or an accordion. It features a musical keyboard on top, and is played by blowing air through a mouthpiece that fits into a hole in the side of the instrument. The keyboard usually covers two or three octaves. Melodicas are small, lightweight, and portable, and many are designed for children to play. They are popular in music education programs, especially in Asia. The modern form of the instrument was invented by Hohner in the late 1950s, though similar instruments have been known in Italy since the 19th century.

== Description ==
The mouthpiece can be a short rigid or semi-flexible plastic piece or a long flexible plastic tube (designed to allow the player to either hold the keyboard so the keys can be seen or lay the keyboard horizontally on a flat surface for two-handed playing). A foot pump can also be used as an alternative to breathing into the instrument. Melodica keyboards typically ascend from a low F note. Keyboards often have 32 or 37 keys, though instruments may have as few as 13 or as many as 45 keys. Larger models include the Hammond Pro 44 or the Ballone Burini Eolina P45, with 44 and 45 keys respectively.

As a free reed instrument, the melodica produces sound by pushing air past individual reeds corresponding to each playable note. When a key is pressed, it opens a valve blocking its corresponding reed, allowing air to pass through it. The sound of each vibrating reed reverberates in the shell of the instrument, which may be made of plastic, timber or metal. Players can control the instrument's volume with air pressure. Unlike most wind instruments, the melodica can play multiple notes simultaneously, limited only by the amount of air available. An external microphone can be used to amplify the instrument or record its sound. Hammond's Pro-44 melodion and Pro 24-B bass melodion each have built-in dynamic microphones which can be connected to a PA system or recording device via a single TRS 1/4" jack output. As early as 1968, Hohner sold a "Professional" model of its Melodica with a built-in pickup.

Melodicas range in price from under US$20 for a simple, plastic instrument to several thousand dollars for a rare, custom-made or antique model.

== Use ==
The melodica was first used as a serious musical instrument in the 1960s by composers such as Steve Reich, in his piece titled Melodica (1966). Brazilian multi-instrumentalist Hermeto Pascoal developed a technique consisting of singing while playing the melodica, resulting in a wide tonal and harmonic palette. Jamaican dub and reggae musician Augustus Pablo popularized it in the 1970s, and his son Addis Pablo takes after him in the same genres. The American musician Jon Batiste was often seen playing a melodica on The Late Show with Stephen Colbert. Funk keyboardist Bernie Worrell played melodica on multiple recordings in Bootsy Collins's discography. The instrument is also associated with the Inti Raymi festival in Otavalo, Ecuador.

== Types ==
Solo melodica
Clavietta melodica playing Irish traditional music, "Rakes of Kildare", played by Troy Banarzi

Melodicas are classified primarily by the range of the instrument. Melodicas with different ranges have slightly different shapes.

- Soprano and alto melodicas are higher-pitched and thinner sounding than tenors. Some are designed to be played with both hands at once: the left hand plays the black keys, and the right hand plays the white keys. Others are played like the tenor melodica.
- Tenor melodicas are a lower-pitched type of melodica. The left hand holds a handle on the bottom, and the right hand plays the keyboard. Tenor melodicas can be played with two hands by inserting a tube into the mouthpiece hole and placing the melodica on a flat surface.
- Bass melodicas include the Hohner Melodica-Basso (discontinued), the Suzuki B-24 Bass Melodion and the Hammond Bass Melodion BB-24.
- The Accordina aka 'Chromatic Button Melodica', generally made of metal, uses the same mechanism and reeds as a traditional melodica. The keyboard is replaced with a button arrangement similar to a chromatic button accordion's keyboard.

== Alternative names ==
The melodica is known by various names, often at the whim of the manufacturer. Melodion (Suzuki), Triola (Seydel), Melodika (Apollo), Melodia (Diana), Pianica (Yamaha), Melodihorn (Samick), Melodyhorn (Angel), Diamonica (Bontempi), Pianetta (Guerrini), face piano, and Clavietta (Borel/Beuscher) are just some of the variants. When a recording technician unfamiliar with the melodica called it a "hooter", the band the Hooters took that as their name.

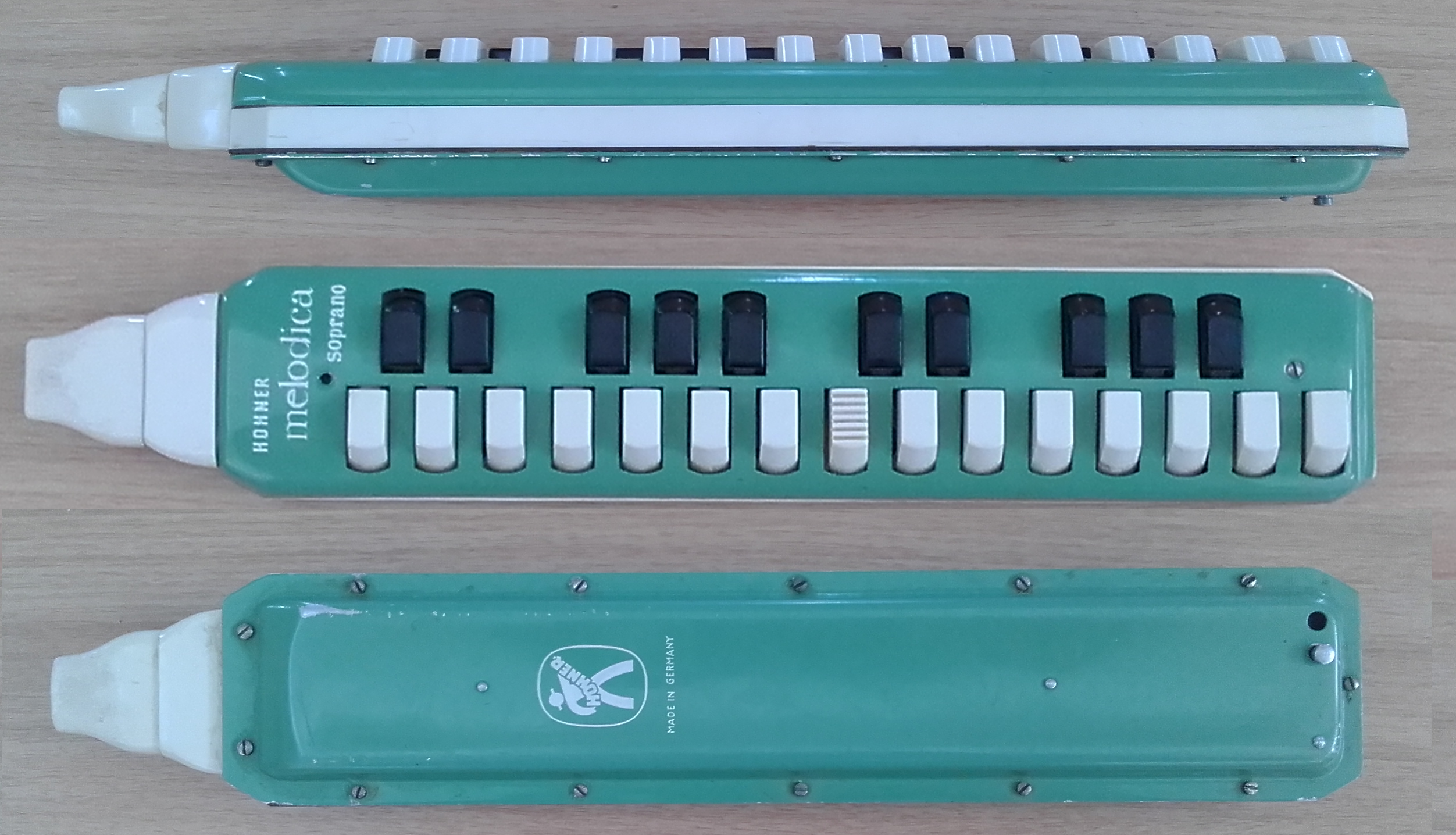
Hohner Melodica Soprano: right side, keyboard and bottom views

== Gallery ==
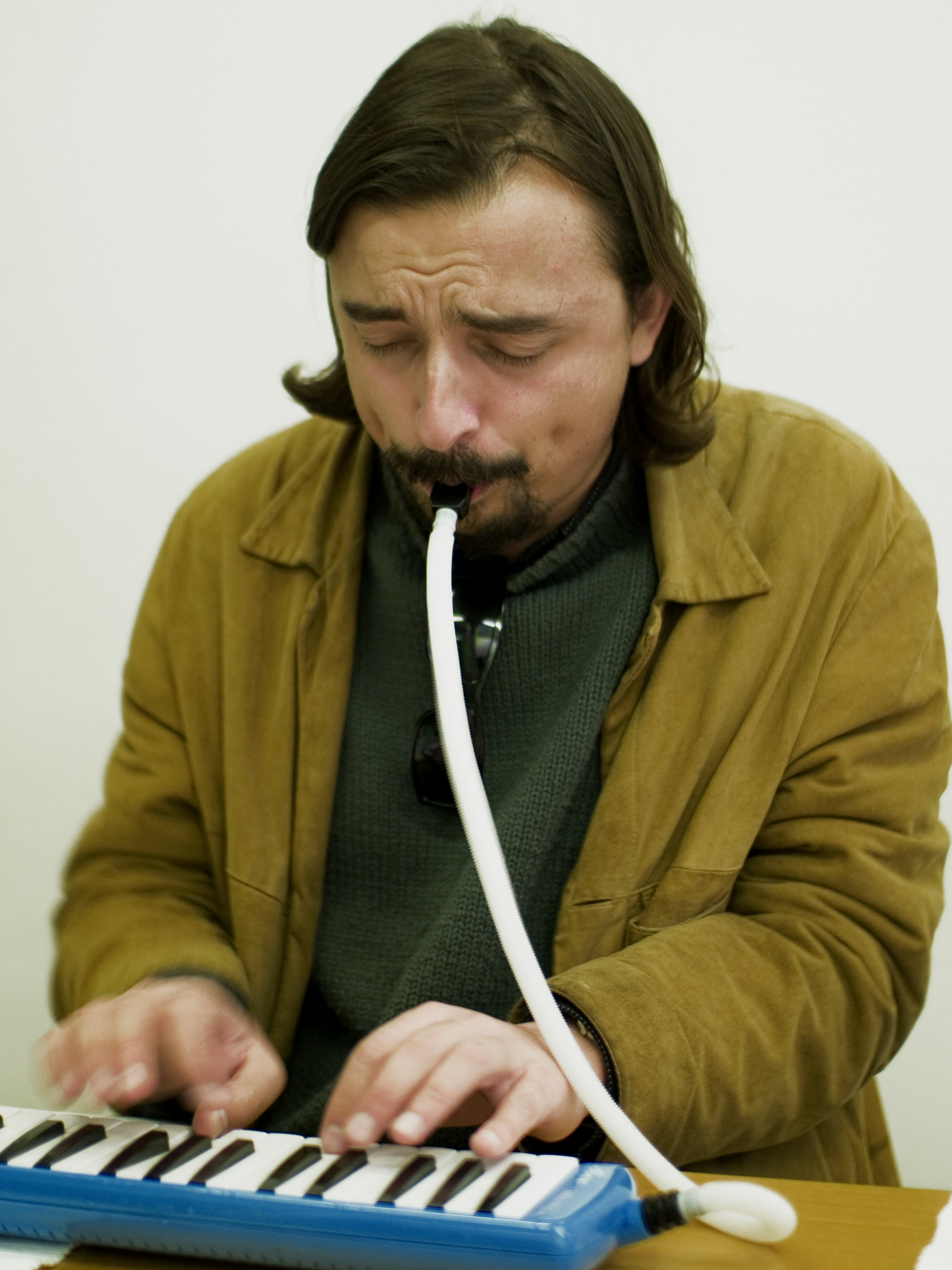
Played horizontally, with two hands and an air tube

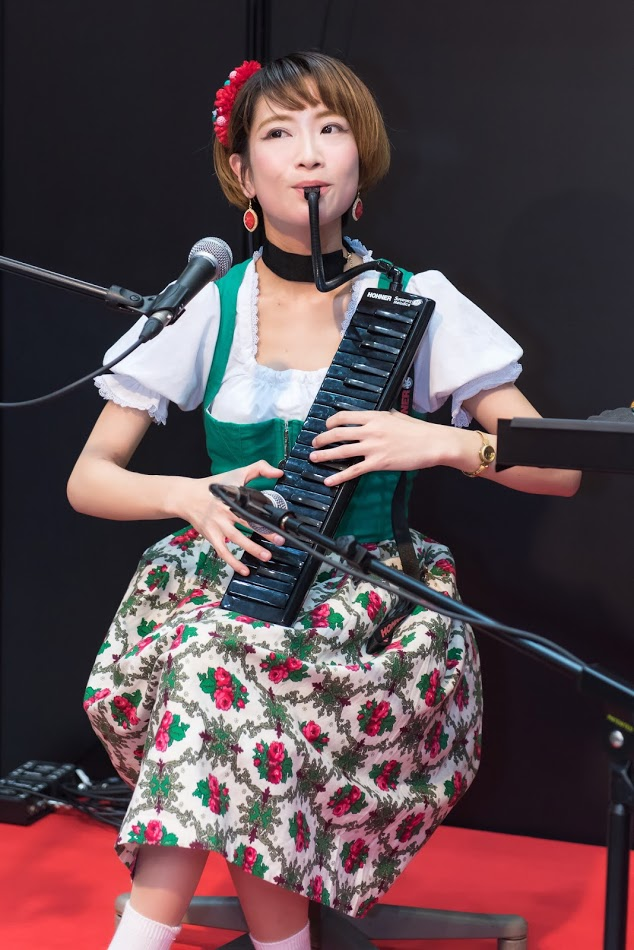
Played vertically, with two hands and an air tube

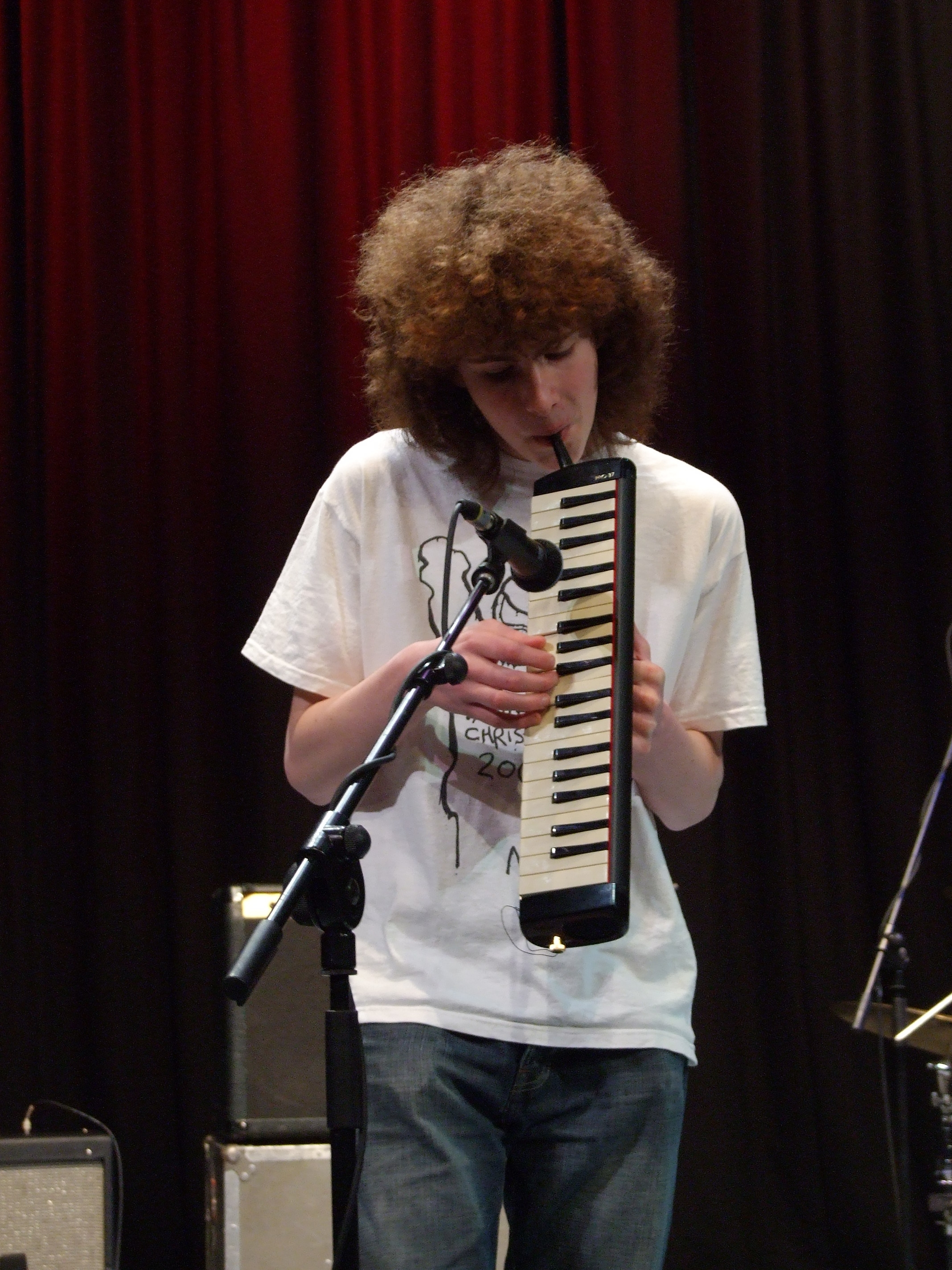
Melodica being played vertically, with one hand and without air tube

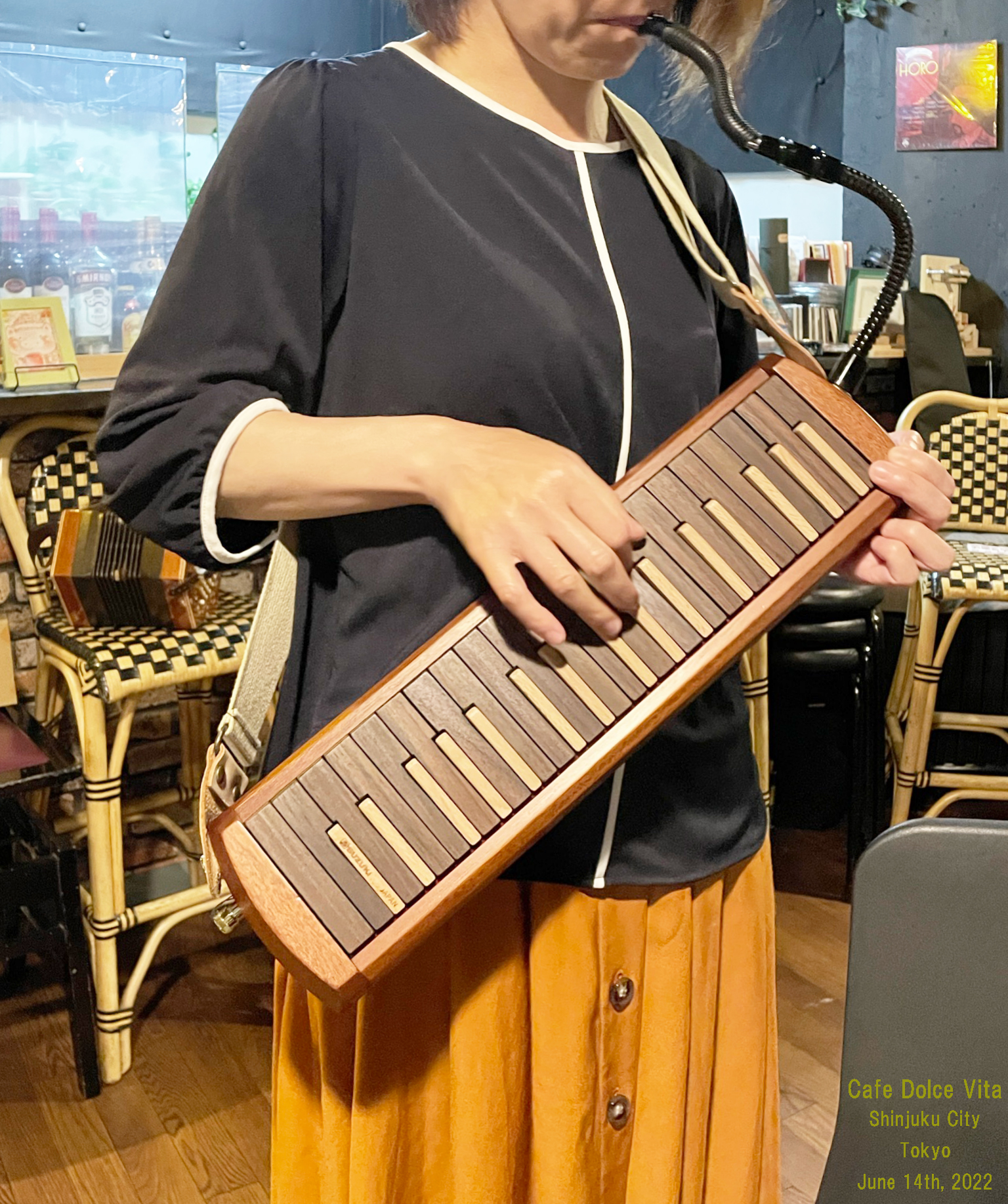
Wooden melodica; Suzuki Wood Melodion W-37

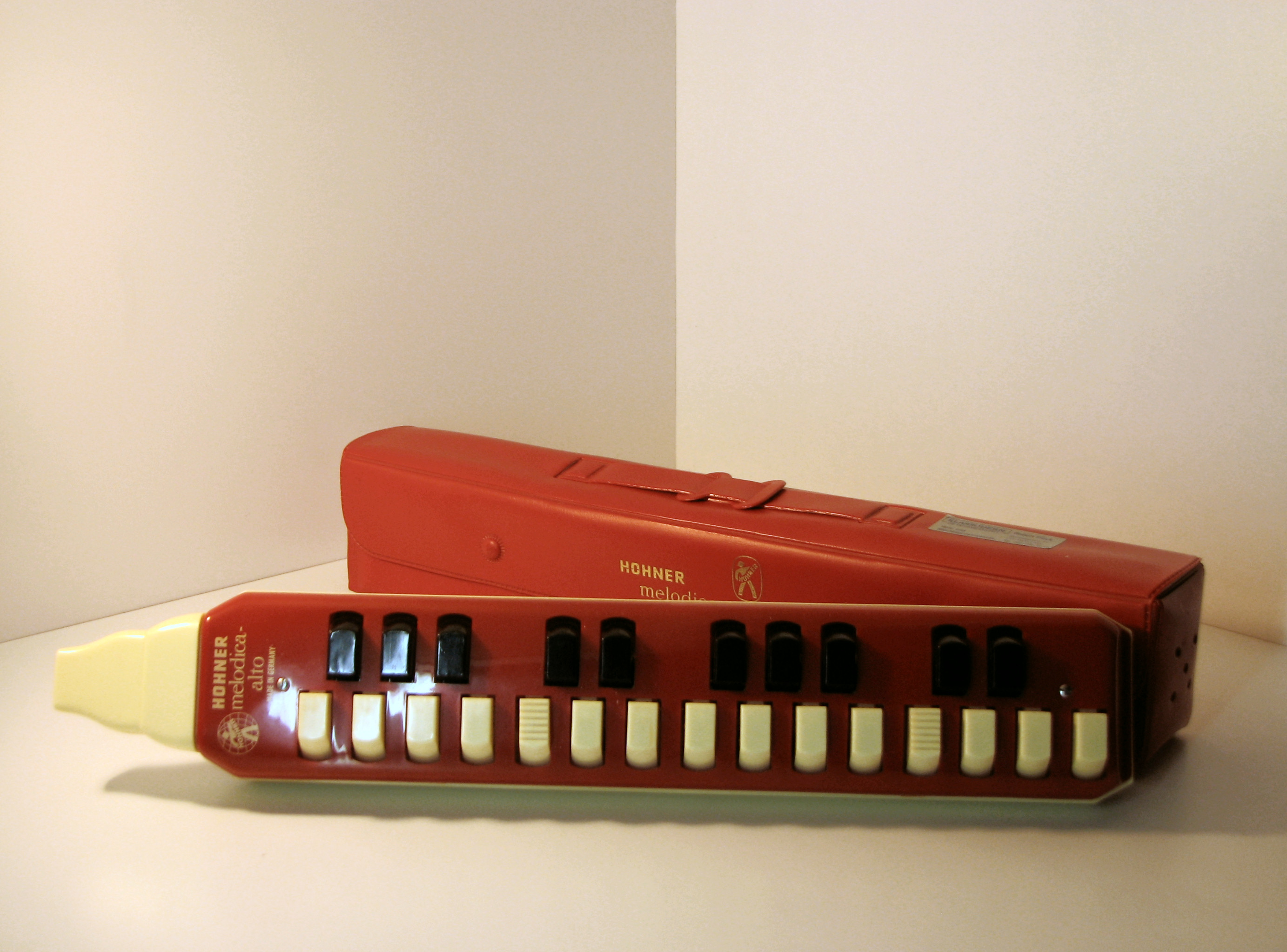
Hohner alto melodica

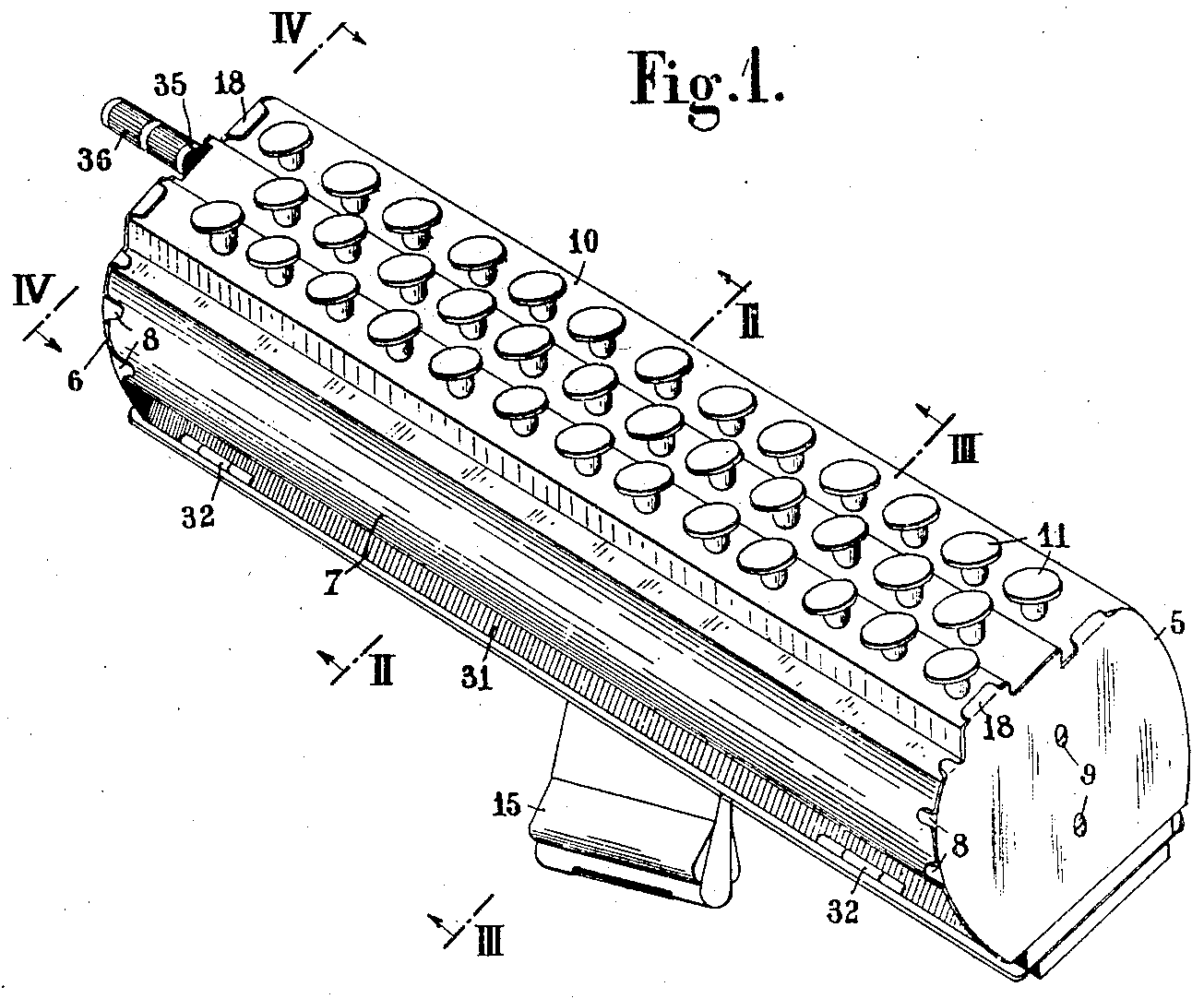
Patent drawing for accordina

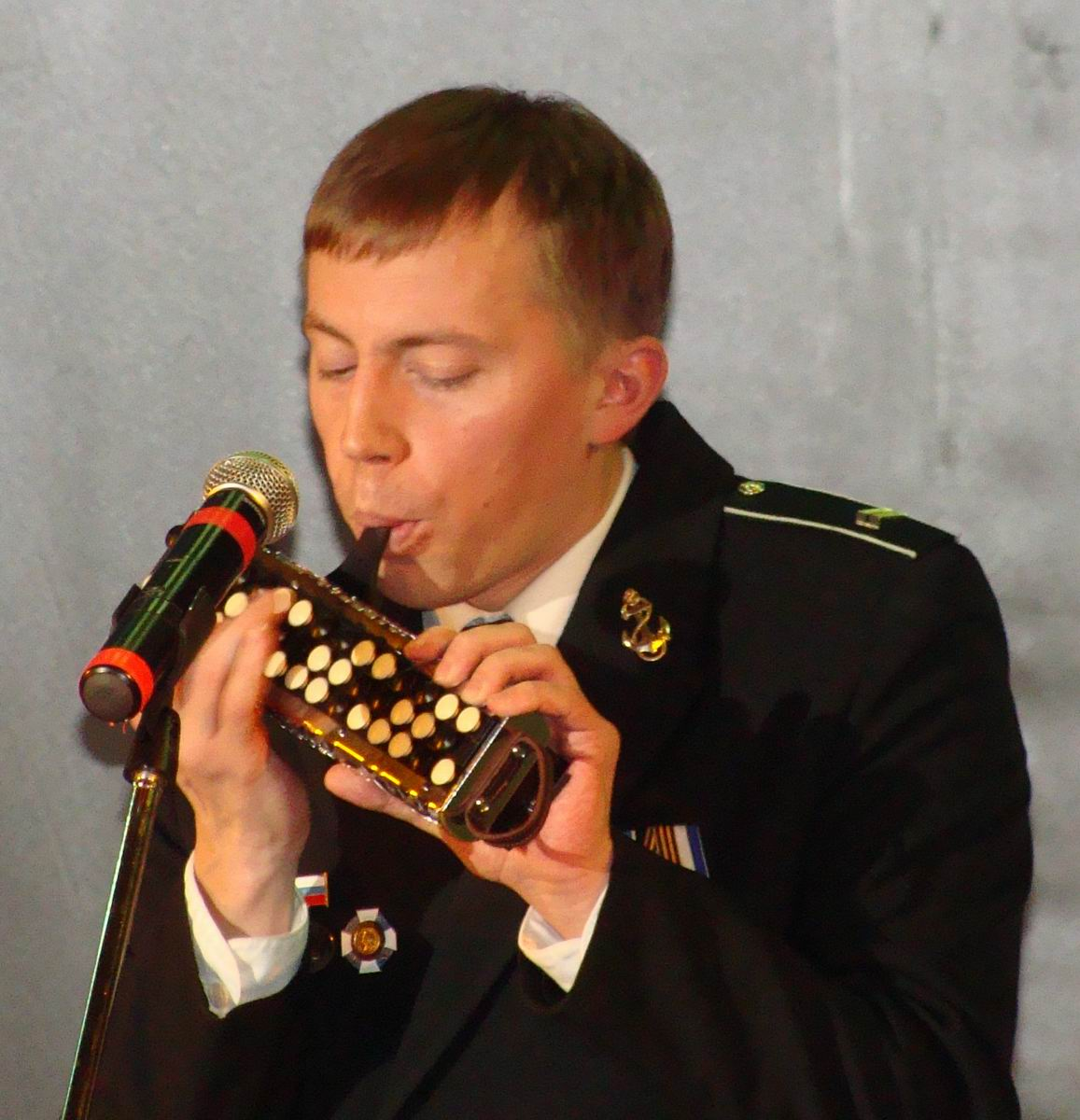
Accordina being played

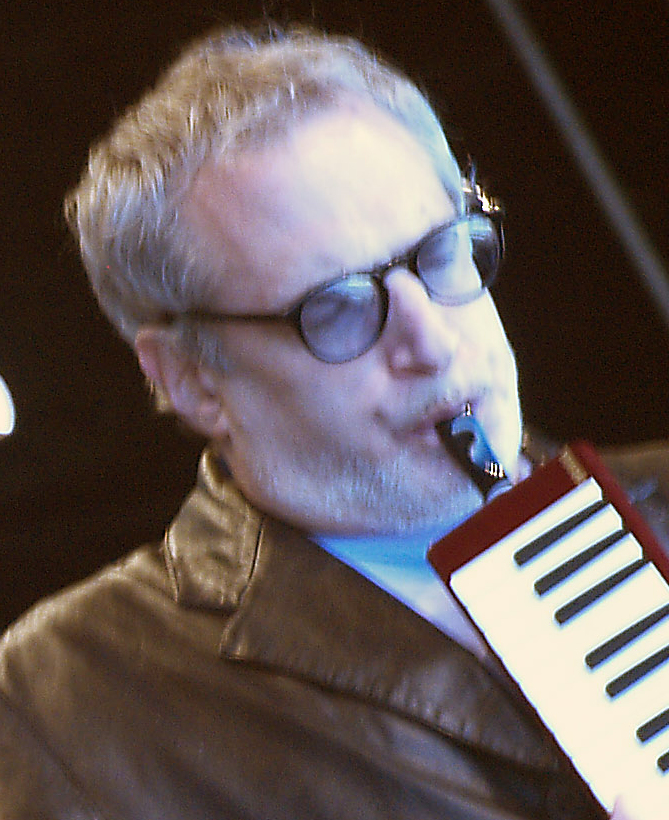
Donald Fagen with a Yamaha Pianica in 2007

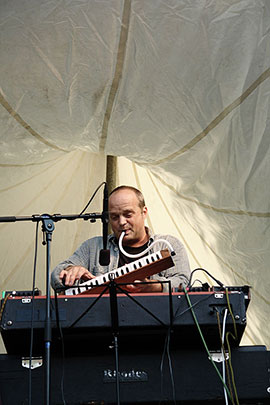
John Medeski

== See also ==
- Accordion
- Claviola
- Couesnophone
- Harmonica
- Melodica in music
- Melodica Men
- Pump organ
