= Nokia Sensor =

Mobile phone software package

Nokia Sensor was a software package available on some mobile handsets manufactured by Nokia. It was an application of Bluetooth communication technology. Nokia Sensor allows users to detect other users who are in the vicinity and; to exchange messages and client defined profiles with them. It was released in 2005.

== Social Spontaneity ==
Nokia Sensor is designed to promote spontaneous communication between users in sociable settings such as bars, nightclubs and railway platforms, business functions etc. Bluetooth wireless technology is used to detect the presence of other suitably enabled mobile phones located within a radius of 10 meters.

== User Folio ==
On detection, the Nokia Sensor users are alerted and may view each other's personal pages (folios). The content of a folio is defined in advance by the Nokia Sensor user and may contain information such as: a digital photo of the user; a username; a short personal description (job, pastimes).

The folio also contains a 'guestbook' where other users may post and read textual entries.

== Free Messaging ==
Bluetooth Wireless Technology allows communication between mobile devices without the need for a network operator, therefore the messages are free of charge.
