= Toothing =

2004 Bluetooth hoax

Toothing was originally a hoax claim that Bluetooth-enabled mobile phones or PDAs were being used to arrange random sexual encounters, perpetrated as a prank on the media who reported it. The hoax was created by Ste Curran, then Editor at Large at the gaming magazine Edge, and ex-journalist Simon Byron. They based it on the two concepts, namely dogging and bluejacking, that were popular at the time. The creators started a forum in March 2004 where they wrote fake news articles about toothing with other members and then sent them off to well-known Internet-based news services. The point of the hoax was to "highlight how journalists are happy to believe something is true without necessarily checking the facts". Dozens of news organizations, including BBC News, Wired News, and The Independent thought the toothing story was real and printed it. On April 4, 2005, Curran and Byron admitted that the whole thing was a hoax. There have, however, been real Bluetooth dating devices since.

== Conception ==
Devised by Swedish telecommunication company Ericsson, Bluetooth is an open Wireless protocol for exchanging data over short distances from mobile devices such as mobile phones, laptops, and personal computers. Originally, Bluetooth was only intended for wireless exchanging of files between these devices, but it was later discovered that it could also be used for sexual intentions. The hoax concept of toothing started around March 2004 in the form of a forum designed by Ste Curran, then Editor at Large at games magazine Edge, and ex-journalist Simon Byron. Toothing was conceived as a merger of the two concepts dogging with bluejacking, both of which were frequently mentioned in the UK media around that time. Byron said he and Curran were "idly messaging about the Stan Collymore dogging scandal, and how this stupid sexual buzzword had (apparently) come from nowhere," when they came up with the concept. "We wondered if we could create our own. We wonder a lot of things, and rarely push them past concept, because we’re as collectively creative as we are frustratingly idle. This particularly concept was simple enough to outstrip the temptations of grinning, saying 'Yeah!', and wandering off to see what was on [television]." Several newspapers have also compared toothing to dogging.

In toothing, a Bluetooth device is used to find other Bluetooth enabled devices within a close distance (on trains or buses, for example), and then send the expression "toothing?" as an initial greeting, letting the person with the enabled Bluetooth device know you are looking for sex. If sending of text messages via Bluetooth is not possible, the Bluetooth name of the mobile phone can be set to "toothing?" or something else to indicate interest. The pair of hoaxers wrote fake news articles on the forum about toothing and sent them off well-known Internet-based news services. Byron said he had to write "Penthouse-letters-page style sexual adventure stories" for articles and interviews with the media. The point with hoax was, according to Byron, to "highlight how journalists are happy to believe something is true without necessarily checking the facts."

== Spread in media ==
The concept of toothing quickly reached a large audience, even in countries outside of the UK. Curran and Byron said they kept a record from the start of all their mentions in the media, "but there were soon too many to record in full." They agreed to do an interview with The Daily Telegraph and "many papers read that and followed up, broadsheet and tabloid, regional, national, all over the planet." One of the hoaxers made an appearance on BBC Radio 5 Live, and a member of the Parliament of the United Kingdom reportedly declared his interest in toothing as a way of meeting women. The couple also received offers to license official toothing merchandise such as sex lines, websites, and mobile-phone software. Dozens of news organizations, including BBC, Wired News, Infosyncworld, and The Independent fell for the story and printed it. The Guardian also printed the story, but the article's author suspected it to be an April Fools' Day prank. The BBC wrote in their article:

One practitioner is Jon, a "Toother" living near London.

"One morning I received an anonymous text message via bluetooth," he told BBC News.

"I didn't understand what had happened, but that evening I did some research and worked out how to send my own."

The pair started to exchange messages on a train station platform; messages which got gradually more flirty.

"Eventually she asked me if I fancied a quickie in the toilets at the station we were travelling to.

"It happened, but I never saw her again."

Since that day Jon - who claims to have had Toothing success five times - has set up a website dedicated to the practice but he admits it takes a degree of perseverance.

== Aftermath ==
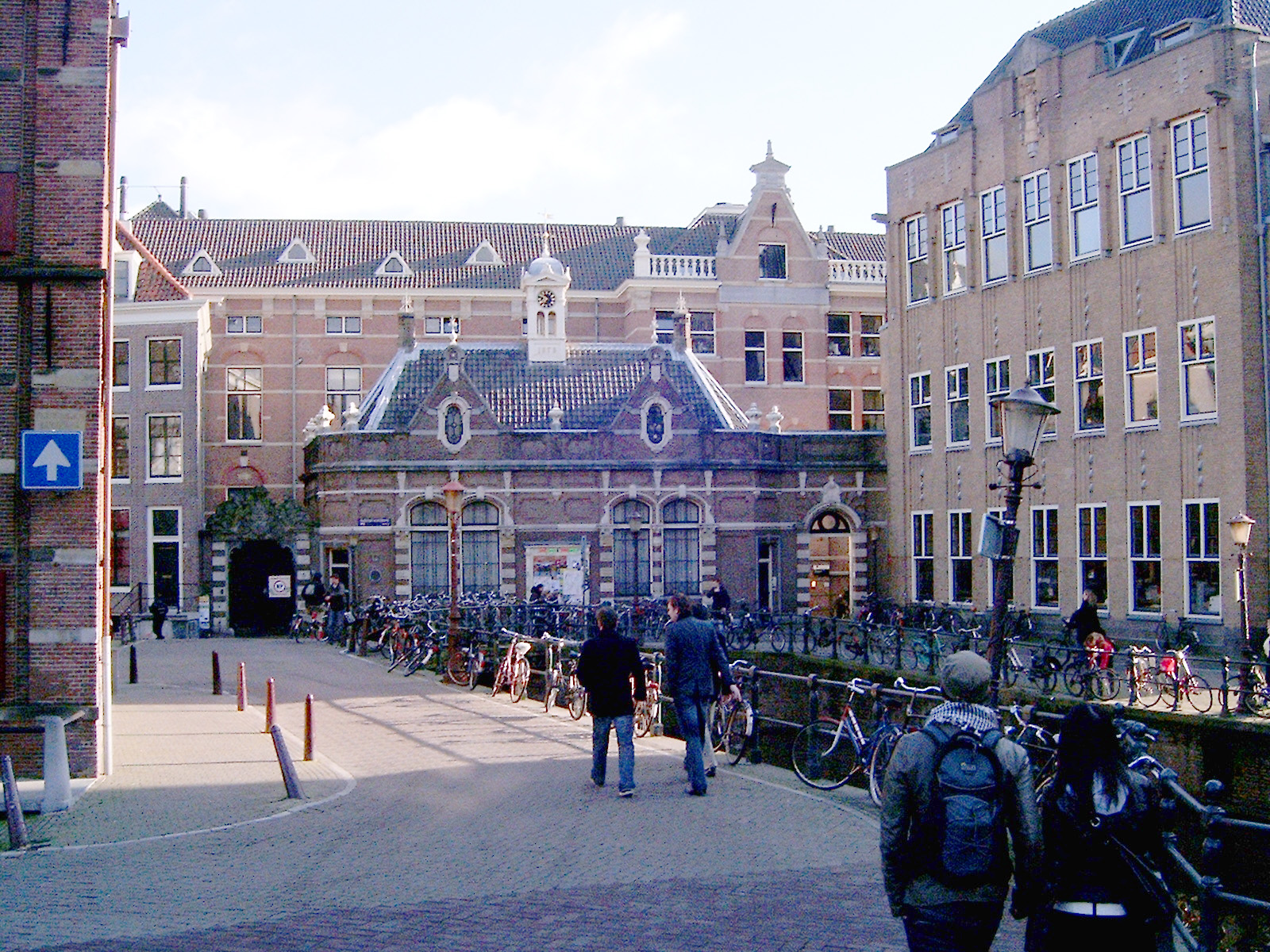
The toothing hoax has been studied by a sociologist at University of Amsterdam (pictured).

On April 4, 2005, the creators of the forum admitted that the whole thing was a hoax. Though the concept of toothing is possible, the hoaxers never intended for it to turn into something real. The couple said: "It's like going into a crowded nightclub, throwing a brick at the dance floor with a love letter attached, and hoping that the person it hits will agree to sleep with you." When announcing the hoax, Curran and Byron reassured that toothing was nothing more than a practical joke gone too far and despite all the articles in newspapers and tabloids, "no one has ever ever, ever toothed." Shanna Petersen, a sexologist, disagreed with the hoaxers' statement that no-one has ever toothed: "It's simple, doesn't take a lot of guts and rejection is nowhere as personal. Of course it's popular. Show people a new way through which they have a chance to have more sex and they'll do it. No matter how much effort goes into it or how meager the results." Multiple forums were in fact created throughout Europe, Asia and America within months of the original post of toothing. People signed up to the forums looking for good locations in their area to tooth, and to share their toothing stories with other members. There have later been real Bluetooth dating devices to hit the market.

University of Bath psychologist Linda Blair said the practice of toothing is down to the human need to take risks: "I think we protect ourselves too much in modern society, and risk is a human need. We need motivation. In some ways this is a tame way of picking people up, it's almost a natural follow up from randomly picking people's names out of the phone book. It's voluntary at all stages, and has choice. As long as that's there and it's legal, then people should be able to do what they want." Sue Peters of the Terrence Higgins Trust worried that anonymous sex made possible by toothing would cause an increase of sexually transmitted diseases such as chlamydia in the United Kingdom. University of Amsterdam sociologist Albert Benschop researched the hoax. He said toothing is "the next logical step" in dating and that the "old game is just adapting to new times". Benschop added that toothing is "just like picking up people in bars but without the silly time-consuming conventions of decorum that people are obliged to keep to these days. This is much more direct. You both know what you want." He also sees it as a way for people "to satisfy their need for intimacy. As long as it helps people out of loneliness and gives them more to enjoy in life, I think it's a very good development."

The term "toothing" was included in the 2006 version of The New Partridge Dictionary of Slang and Unconventional English. It was described as an "anonymous casual sexual activity with any partner arranged over Bluetooth radio technology enabled mobile phones." In addition, toothing is listed in the Sex Slang dictionary, authored by Tom Dalzell and Terry Victor, with an explanation similar to the one in the New Partridge Dictionary. Toothing was referenced in an episode of the American television series CSI: Miami, called "Killer Date", that aired in the United States on April 18, 2005.

== See also ==
- Gel bracelet
- Grindr
