= Ratatat (album) =

Studio album by Ratatat
- Released: April 20, 2004
- Recorded: July 2001 – May 2003; Evan Mast's apartment, Crown Heights, Brooklyn
- Genres: Electronica; instrumental hip hop; electronic rock; experimental rock; neo-psychedelia
- Length: 45:25
- Label: XL Recordings
- Producers: Evan Mast, Mike Stroud

Ratatat chronology
Ratatat (2004)	Ratatat Remixes Vol. 1 (2004)

Singles from Ratatat
- 1. "Seventeen Years" Released: 2003; 2. "Cherry" Released: October 4, 2004

Ratatat is the debut album from the Brooklyn-based electronic duo of the same name. It was recorded between July 2001 and May 2003 in bassist Evan Mast's Crown Heights, Brooklyn apartment and mixed in June 2003 before its release on April 20, 2004.

The album is essentially instrumental, although it has occasional voice excerpts (referred to in the liner notes as "spoken interludes") by local MC and rapper Young Churf. The track "Spanish Armada" contains a French horn played by Michal Emanovsky. Other tracks of note are "Germany to Germany", later released as a single; and "Cherry", a homage to Ratatat's original name.

The most well known song on the album is "Seventeen Years". It was featured in a television advertisement titled "Accessorize" for the Hummer H2 in 2004, in the British television show Soccer AM as the original background music for The Crossbar Challenge segment, and in Level One Productions's ski movie Shanghai Six. It was also played during Rob's party in the 2008 monster movie Cloverfield as well as Keith Hufnagel's part in the DVS skateboard video Skate More. The song "Bustelo" was used in several Jaguar commercials in mid-2006.

== Critical reception ==
Professional ratings
Aggregate scores
Source	Rating
Metacritic	72/100
Review scores
Source	Rating
AllMusic	3.5/5 stars
Cokemachineglow	75%
Gigwise	2/5 stars
Pitchfork	(8.4/10)
Tiny Mix Tapes	3.5/5 stars

Ratatat was met with "generally favorable" reviews from critics. At Metacritic, which assigns a weighted average rating out of 100 to reviews from mainstream publications, this release received an average score of 72, based on 14 reviews.

== Track listing ==
1. "Seventeen Years" – 4:26
2. "El Pico" – 4:41
3. "Crips" – 3:47
4. "Desert Eagle" – 4:25
5. "Everest" – 4:10
6. "Bustelo" – 2:27
7. "Breaking Away" – 4:19
8. "Lapland" – 4:56
9. "Germany to Germany" – 3:38
10. "Spanish Armada" – 2:58
11. "Cherry" – 5:58
