= E*vax =

American musical artist

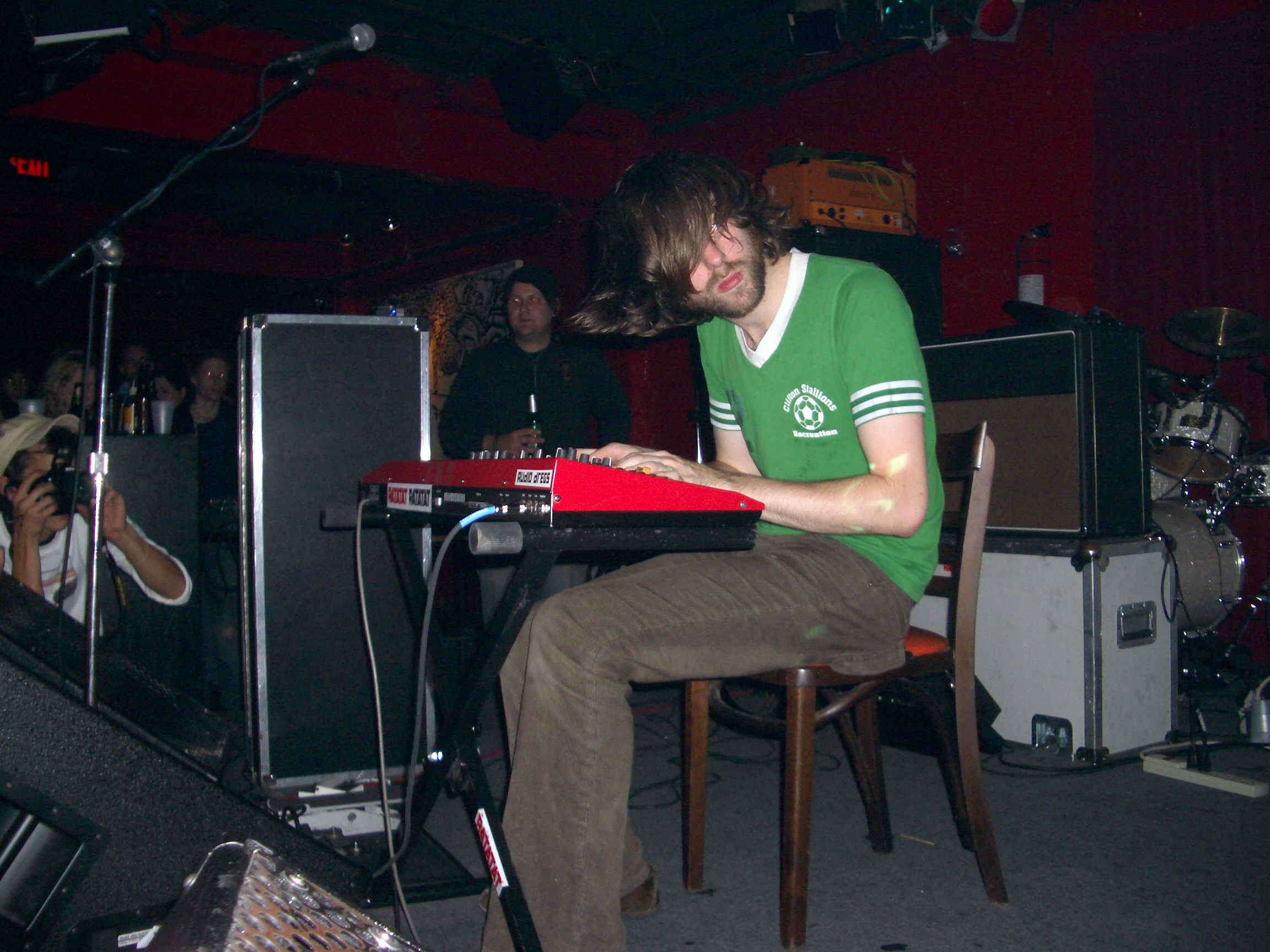
- E.Vax performing at the Grog Shop in 2004

Background information
- Born: Evan Peter Mast
- Origin: Cleveland, Ohio, U.S.
- Genres: Electronic; rock; hip house
- Occupations: Disc jockey; record producer; songwriter
- Years active: 2001–present
- Labels: XL; Rex; Audio Dregs; Because
- Member of: Ratatat

Evan Peter Mast, also known by his stage name E*vax or E.Vax, is an American EDM record producer and DJ. He is one-half of the New York–based electronic rock band Ratatat, alongside Mike Stroud.

== Career ==
Mast met his Ratatat bandmate Mike Stroud when they were both students at Skidmore College. They released their self-titled debut album in 2004, followed by four more studio albums.

Mast has released 7-inch singles on Static Caravan Recordings and Mold Recordings, along with an EP in collaboration with musician Craig Wedren, best known as the lead vocalist and guitarist of the band Shudder to Think. Mast also recorded a track titled "The Mule" for the HBO series Silicon Valley.

Mast has written and produced hip-hop music as E*vax. His first credit was on the track "Look Alive" performed by rapper Despot featuring Mast's own band Ratatat from the record label Definitive Jux compilation album Definitive Jux Presents IV, released in 2009. Some years later he produced the track "$100 Bill" performed by rapper Jay-Z, the opening track from Music from Baz Luhrmann's Film The Great Gatsby, released in 2013. He again collaborated with Despot in 2015, producing "House of Bricks", the lead single from the rapper's debut studio album We're All Excited. In 2018, Mast worked together with Kanye West during the latter's Wyoming Sessions, which led him to write and produce on Kids See Ghosts's self-titled debut studio album for the tracks "Feel the Love", "Fire" and "Reborn"; as well as the Nas track "Adam and Eve" from the rapper's twelfth studio album Nasir, and also a track from Teyana Taylor's second studio album K.T.S.E. titled "Rose in Harlem". The next year he co-produced "Selah", the second track from West's ninth studio album Jesus Is King, while he once again collaborated with Teyana Taylor, producing her single "We Got Love" from her third studio album The Album (2020).

As E.Vax, he released a self-titled album on September 17, 2021, which included the singles "Rabindra" and "Karst".

On June 26, 2026, he released his third studio album as E.Vax, Just Like Fire, on Because Music.

== Audio Dregs ==
E*vax and his brother E*rock operate their independent record label Audio Dregs. His first album, Parking Lot Music, was released on 4 April 2001. Mast's music uses everyday sounds to create simple electronic beats.

=== Artists ===
- O.Lamm
- Lullatone
- Melodium
- Kinn
- Plants
- Yuichiro Fujimoto
- Semuin
- Strategy
- Global Goon
- Ratatat
- E*Vax
- E*Rock
- F.S. Blumm
- Lineland
- Harald "Sack" Ziegler
- Inkblot
- Dim Dim
- The Sensualists
- The Grace Period
- Carpet Musics
- Supersprite
- Mumbleboy
- Copy

== Discography ==
=== Studio albums ===
Album	Date	Label
Parking Lot Music	April 4, 2001	Audio Dregs
E.Vax	September 17, 2021	Because Music
Just Like Fire	June 26, 2026	Because Music

=== Extended plays ===
EP	Date	Label
Glacial Sports	1998	Audio Dregs
Foiled	2000	Static Caravan
Cross Country Ski/Clear Red Water	2000	Static Caravan
B. Fleischmann/E*Vax Split	2000	Audio Dregs
Zealectronic Beige	2003	Zealectronic
Day Ditty (with Craig Wedren)	2007	Mold Recordings

=== Production and songwriting credits ===
- Despot – "Look Alive" (featuring Ratatat) – Definitive Jux Presents IV (2009)
- Kid Cudi – "Pursuit of Happiness" (featuring MGMT & Ratatat) and "Alive (Nightmare)" from Man on the Moon: The End of Day (2009)
- Jay-Z – "$100 Bill" from The Great Gatsby: Music from Baz Luhrmann's Film (2013)
- Despot – "House of Bricks" – We're All Excited (2015)
- E*vax – "The Mule" from Silicon Valley (Music from the HBO Original Series) (2017)
- Kids See Ghosts – "Feel the Love" (featuring Pusha T), "Fire" and "Reborn" from Kids See Ghosts (2018)
- Nas – "Adam and Eve" (featuring The-Dream) from Nasir (2018)
- Teyana Taylor – "Rose in Harlem" from K.T.S.E. (2018)
- Kanye West – "Selah" from Jesus Is King (2019)
- Teyana Taylor – "We Got Love" from The Album (2020)
- Kid Cudi – "Elsie's Baby Boy (Flashback)" and "The Pale Moonlight" from Man on the Moon III: The Chosen (2020)
- Kanye West – "God Breathed", "Moon", "Jail", "Jail pt. 2", "Lord I Need You" and "Never Abandon Your Family" from Donda (2021)
- Vory – "Daylight" (featuring Kanye West) from Lost Souls (2022)
- Kid Cudi – "Willing to Trust" (featuring Ty Dolla $ign) and "Livin' My Truth" from Entergalactic (2022)
- Tainy – "11 y Once" (with E.Vax & Sech) from Data (2023)
- Travis Scott – "Sirens" from Utopia (2023)
- Kid Cudi – "Everybody Like" (featuring Pusha T) from Insano (Nitro Mega) (2024)
- ¥$ – "530" from Vultures 2 (2024)
