= Reborn (song) =

2018 song by Kids See Ghosts

Song by Kids See Ghosts

from the album Kids See Ghosts
- Released: June 8, 2018
- Studio: West Lake Ranch, Jackson Hole, Wyoming
- Length: 5:24
- Label: GOOD; Def Jam
- Songwriters: Kanye West; Scott Mescudi; Evan Mast; Oladipo Omishore
- Producers: Kid Cudi; Dot da Genius

Kids See Ghosts track listing
- 7 tracks: 1. "Feel the Love"; 2. "Fire"; 3. "4th Dimension"; 4. "Freeee (Ghost Town, Pt. 2)"; 5. "Reborn"; 6. "Kids See Ghosts"; 7. "Cudi Montage"

"Reborn" is a song by American hip-hop duo Kids See Ghosts, composed of the rappers Kid Cudi and Kanye West, from their eponymous debut studio album (2018). The song was produced by the latter of the two members and Dot da Genius, while co-produced by Plain Pat and Evan Mast, with additional production from Benny Blanco. The lead producers wrote it alongside West and Mast. Prior to release, Kid Cudi had posted about being reborn. Dot da Genius recorded with the duo in 2018; he recalled West as unifying him and Cudi's musical interests.

According to Kid Cudi, the song is supposed to sound as if it continues questions he asked in the past. An anthemic track, "Reborn" relies on varying lullaby style chords. Lyrically, its message is about being reborn from mental illness; Kids See Ghosts address the personal issues they have overcome. The song was met with universal acclaim from music critics, who were often appreciative of the duo's lyricism. Some selected the song as a standout on the album, while other critics complimented Kid Cudi's vocals and West's verse. It was named as one of the best songs of 2018 by multiple publications, such as Okayplayer and Vice.

In the United States, "Reborn" reached number 39 on the Billboard Hot 100 and number 18 on the Hot R&B/Hip-Hop Songs chart. It was a top 50 hit in six other countries, including Canada and Greece. The song has been certified platinum in the US by the Recording Industry Association of America (RIAA). West and the Sunday Service Choir performed a rendition of it at the group's first concert in January 2019, and Kids See Ghosts performed the song live at the Coachella Valley Music and Arts Festival later that year. Nicole Millar delivered an indie pop cover version of the song for Triple J's Like a Version in April 2019.

== Background and recording ==
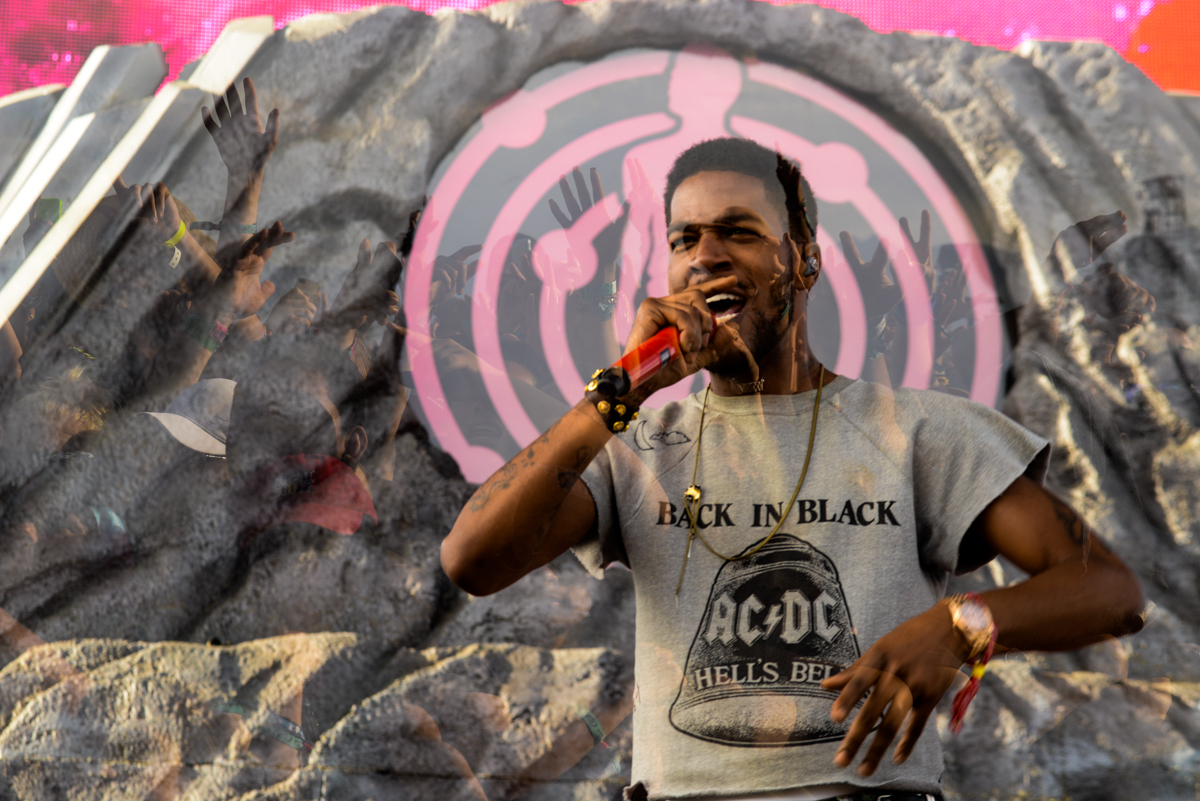
Kid Cudi first alluded to "Reborn" in a Facebook post from 2016, focused on his depressive and suicidal thoughts.

On April 19, 2018, Kanye West announced a collaborative album with Kid Cudi. The album was revealed as being titled Kids See Ghosts by West, with him setting its release date as June 8, 2018. Kid Cudi had been featured on a number of tracks by West prior to the announcement, including "Welcome to Heartbreak" (2008) and "Gorgeous" (2010). West released his eighth studio album Ye on June 1, 2018, with vocals from Kid Cudi included on the tracks "No Mistakes" and "Ghost Town". After helping produce the former of the two tracks in Wyoming, American record producer Dot da Genius served as a producer for the Kids See Ghosts songs "Reborn" and "Cudi Montage" while he spent time in the state during 2018. The producer was a college student at the time when he first met Kid Cudi in 2007, reminiscing in a 2018 interview on how he was new to production when the rapper "came by my studio setup in my parents' living room". Despite Dot da Genius asserting their "immediate vibe" continued from the meeting onwards, he admitted West "was a very big unifier in our interests as musicians" while painting him as "on another level" the two took notice of. Commenting on recording with Kids See Ghosts in Wyoming, Dot da Genius explained that he simply "tried to make everything as epic sounding as possible" and lauded the duo as "two of the best". From his perspective, anything mediocre will not work for them "and they will definitely let you know"; he also recounted that the album is "a blessing to be a part of, and I know the music will help people". The song was produced by Kid Cudi and Dot da Genius, with co-production from Plain Pat and Evan Mast, while Benny Blanco served as an additional producer. It stands along with "Cudi Montage" as one of the two tracks on Kids See Ghosts that West did not contribute any production to. The lead producers co-wrote the song with West and Mast. With a length of 5 minutes and 24 seconds (5:24), "Reborn" stands as the longest song on the album.

On October 4, 2016, Kid Cudi shared a Facebook post revealing that he checked himself into rehab "for depression and suicidal urges". The rapper confessed to having felt ashamed while saying he is not "at peace" and hasn't been "since you've known me", asserting that if he had not gone to rehab, he "would've done something" to himself. Close to the post's conclusion, Kid Cudi wrote, "I'll be back, stronger, better. Reborn." He went on to explain in a July 2018 Billboard cover story that the song is intended "to sound like a continuation" of questions asked in his past work, representing where things are "at now" for Kids See Ghosts and where it "go[es] from here". Kid Cudi said of the reasoning behind this that he does not think "people got that record" from him and opened up about it not "ha[ving] been said that I'm good, that I'm OK", admitting he wasn't "good" in the past. The member revealed he had thoughts around how to "let the world know" and that he felt great about West deciding to use the song, "because it was perfect for both -- we are both reborn after what we went through. I couldn't have made a song like 'Reborn' until now, because I didn't feel reborn yet." Kid Cudi also spoke of how Kids See Ghosts "knew" the track was one of the songs they wanted to use while recording for the album in Wyoming.

Detailing the song's recording in an October 2018 interview with GQ, the member recalls himself having had the hook immediately and taking a while to write any verses due to it being "so good" that following up felt like a challenge. Referring to working at his house with Dot da Genius, Kid Cudi states the idea for the song kind of "came to us", crediting the producer's input for making it better. He explains also that Mast helped with "some stuff" at the end of "Reborn", whereas Plain Pat "added some stuff to the drums", and fondly remembers the song as "one of the first ones that [the duo] had on the album". The member cites West as having gone "crazy for it" and himself as having been "really happy that he liked that joint" due to "rooting for it", specifically expressing admiration for the melodies and the hook. Prior to referencing mental illness on the song, West had struggled with it for 10 years.

== Composition and lyrics ==
"Reborn"
A 29-second sample of "Reborn", featuring West rapping over drums and the piano that drives the song's staccato beat. West raps about his bipolar disorder and the surrounding controversies, as well as his antisocial tendencies. This is followed by Kid Cudi performing a mantra on the chorus, where he chants in a gentle, harmonic tone and vows for him and West to abandon their past mistakes and "keep movin' forward".

Musically, "Reborn" is an anthemic track. A number of music journalists viewed it as a sequel to Kid Cudi's 2009 single "Pursuit of Happiness". The song has a staccato beat, which is driven by piano. It is reliant on lullaby-like chords, with the song including chord changes. Drums are heavily featured, as well as melodies that Kid Cudi contributes. In the eyes of Ludovic Hunter-Tilney from the Financial Times, the song has a "clanking landscape". The intro features plinking piano keys, alongside humming from Kid Cudi. The chorus is a mantra, performed by the member repeatedly. It sees him chanting in a gentle, harmonic tone. After the chorus, West delivers the first verse of the song. Kid Cudi goes on to perform the second verse, for which he mostly sings and partially croons. The song features a beat switch contributed by Mast towards the end, accompanied by an organ.

The song is a mission statement that conveys a message of experiencing rebirth from mental illness, with Kids See Ghosts addressing personal issues that have been overcome by them. On the song's chorus, Kid Cudi offers determination for him and West to leave their mistakes behind in the past and move forward. West's verse sees him alluding to his bipolar disorder and the resulting controversies, as well as acknowledging his antisocial tendencies and opioid addiction. At one point, the member casually criticizes his opponents as like Mario and asserts that "it's all a game". Kid Cudi uses his verse to go over his struggles with depression and drug dependency, while also addressing going through rehab. The song's outro sees him repeating, "Keep moving forward/Keep moving forward."

== Release and promotion ==
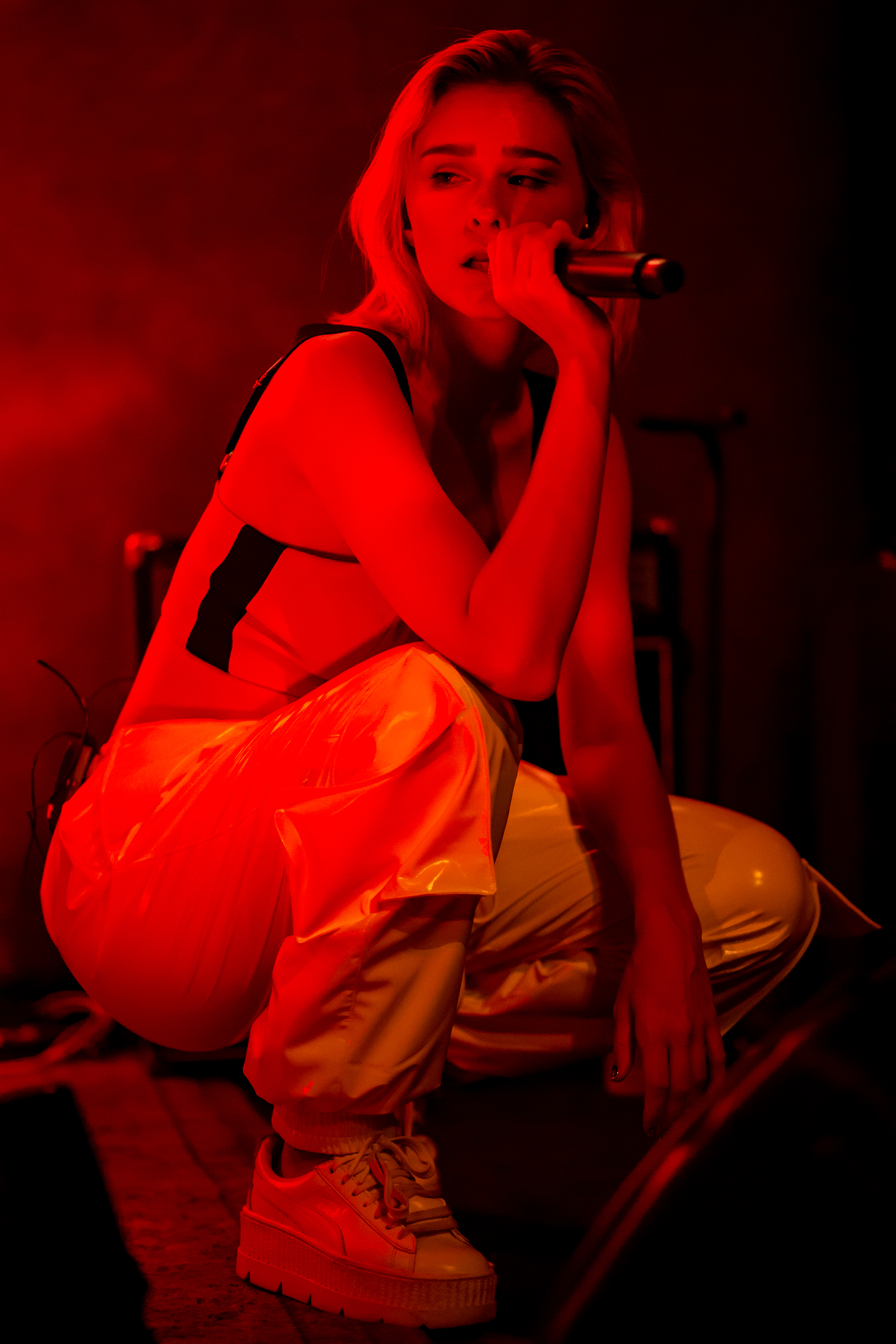
Nicole Millar covered the song in April 2019 for Like a Version, with her cover including an alternate build and drop.

On June 8, 2018, "Reborn" was included as the fifth track on Kids See Ghosts' eponymous debut studio album, switching position from its originally slated release as the seventh and final track. On the day it was released, multiple tracks from the album were mislabeled on streaming services as the result of a technical error, including "Reborn" being falsely labeled as the first track on the album, "Feel the Love". American comedian Pete Davidson shared a blurry picture of him and his then-girlfriend Ariana Grande at the listening party for Kids See Ghosts on June 8, 2018, which he captioned with the song's title alongside varied emojis. The couple went on to get matching tattoos that read "Reborn" in tribute to the song.

For the first concert that they were billed as Kids See Ghosts, the duo performed the song at the 2018 Camp Flog Gnaw Carnival. Though "Reborn" was the sixth track of the set, it was the fifth track they performed that was released under the Kids See Ghosts moniker. For the performance, the backing visuals of pulsating bright colors that were present for the previous song transformed into the Kids See Ghosts cover art. While performing, West forgot several of the lyrics to his verse. West's wife Kim Kardashian shared rehearsal footage of his gospel group the Sunday Service Choir via her Instagram Story on January 6, 2019; the footage included Kids See Ghosts joining the group to perform the song. Later that day, the Sunday Service Choir performed a rendition of the song with West during their first concert. It was the second track to be performed, beginning at around one and a half minutes into the concert, at which Kid Cudi was an attendee. At one point of the performance, a large number of group members replicated his hums from the hook. For his weekend two set at the 2019 Coachella Music Festival, Kid Cudi brought out West as a surprise, with them performing a rendition of the song from the Sahara Tent. Accompanied by an entourage of instrumentalists and back up singers, Canadian-Australian musician Nicole Millar delivered an indie pop cover version of "Reborn" on April 12, 2019, for Australian radio station Triple J's weekly segment Like a Version. An alternative build and drop were included in the cover, though the hook was similar to that of the original. The original songwriters received credit as the song's composers.

== Critical reception ==
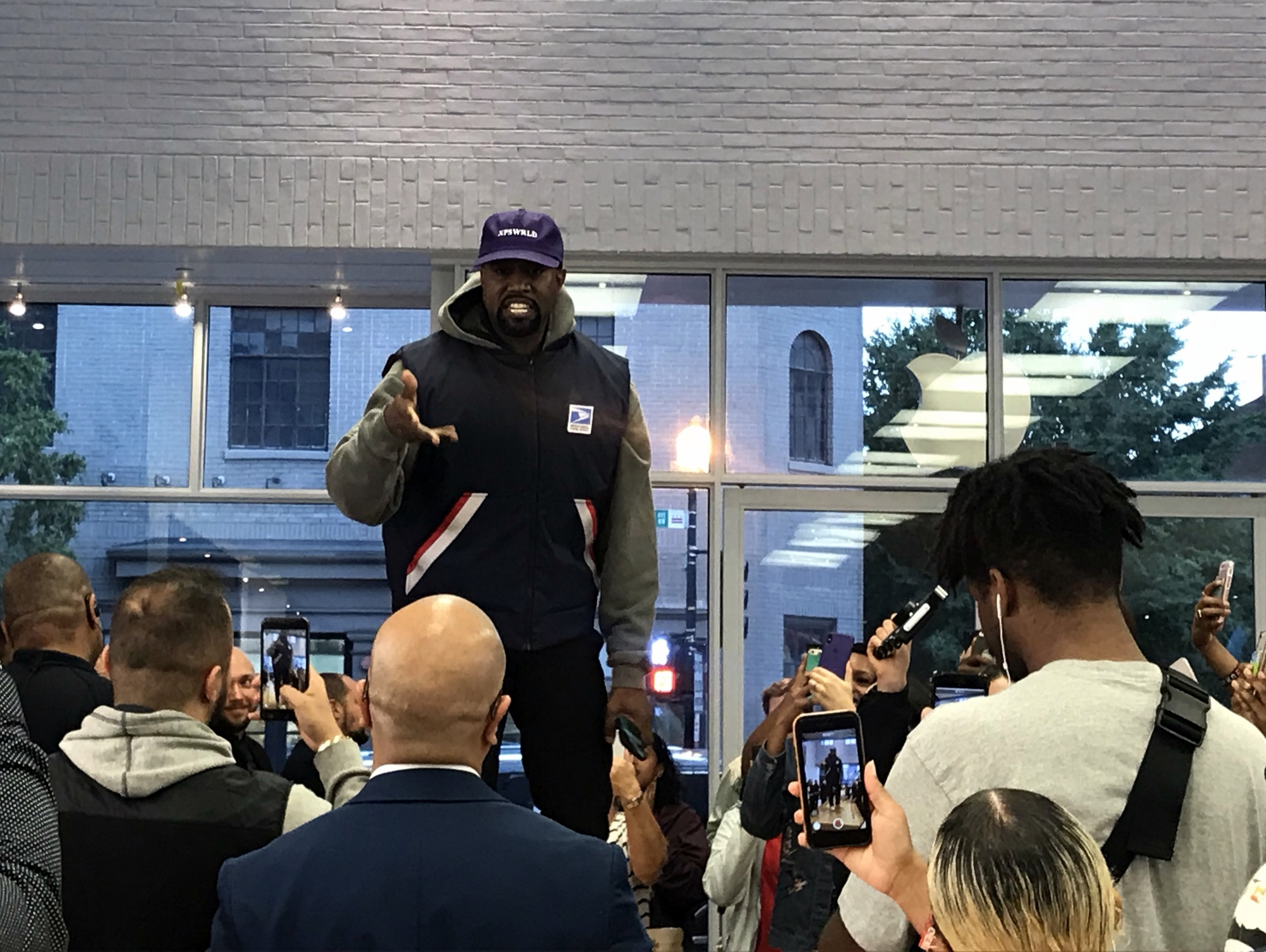
West's verse on the song garnered strong responses from numerous reviewers, some of whom viewed it as a step-up from his previous offerings.

The song was acclaimed by music critics, with many praising the lyrical content. Russell Dean Stone of Highsnobiety singled out the "liberating" track as "an anthemic standout" on the album, noticing it is "about healing and coming through dark times", with the latter being where hope is non-existent that the times will "end with stepping into the light and taking a deep breath". Dean Stone further wrote that the chanting on the song is "uplifting", alongside admiring the "staggering beauty" of the organ. Cam Wolf of GQ pointed to "Reborn" as the best song on the album; he observed that the dichotomy between Kids See Ghosts and Ye "feels most striking" on the song because of West going over "a lot of the same themes" in a more understandable manner, going on to appreciate Kid Cudi's verse and note the chorus "really pulls the track together". Jayson Greene of Pitchfork, in a review of Kids See Ghosts, described the song as "the most unhurried and atmospheric music of [the album's] chaotic cycle", specifically calling West's verse one of his best in years and writing that it is preceded by a lengthy "spacious breath of a drum track", as well as valuing the calmness and coolness of Kid Cudi's presence. Writing for The Line of Best Fit, Eoin Donnelly considered the song to provide proper coverage of Kids See Ghosts' "travails", stating it is "clearly ordained as the emotional centrepiece of KSG" while applauding the duo's "iconic" display of vulnerability. NME critic Jordan Bassett made the observation that the staccato beat of "Reborn" is "brilliant" and "brittle", and said the song sees Kids See Ghosts "looking back over the vast distance they've travelled so far".

Marty Sartini Garner of The A.V. Club labeled the song "a clear-eyed mission statement" that features Kid Cudi utilizing a "soft but assured" voice, being taken aback by his gentleness and stating it "rubs off" in the form of West being "more direct than he has been" since the track "Real Friends" (2016). Andreas Hale of Billboard hailed the song as the "spiritual successor" to "Pursuit of Happiness", attributing the resemblance to the former of the two members' "captivating" hook, West's "strong" lyrical performance and "the magnetic production". For Exclaim, Riley Wallace asserted that Kids See Ghosts appear to shed "the demons, shackles and negativity" they are "plagu[ed]" by so the duo can move forward "with a clear state of mind", adding praise of the intro. HipHopDX's Narsimha Chintaluri dubbed the track "the album's moving centerpiece", opining that Kid Cudi's performance leads to feeling "as warm and vulnerable and seen as the best of his early work" and additionally noting the "exactness" of West's performance, before lauding it as "his most militant and focused turnout in ages". Christoper R. Weingarten from Rolling Stone shed a more negative light on the song, deeming it overly repetitive and making a comparison to the YouTube video that looped the chorus of rapper Post Malone's "Rockstar" (2017) "over and over again".

=== Accolades ===
On June 20, 2018, Business Insider named "Reborn" as the best song of the year up to that date. Eric Renner Brown of Billboard ranked the song as the fourth best from the five albums produced by West in 2018. (Note: Pusha T's Daytona, West's Ye, Kids See Ghosts, Nas' Nasir, and Teyana Taylor's K.T.S.E.) It was ranked by Joe as the second best song of the year, with Dave Hanratty of the website calling the track "the pick" of Kids See Ghosts and noting that Kid Cudi particularly "takes flight on a patient, looping confessional" full of "positivity and determination" against "underlying demons". Okayplayer selected it as the fourth best song of 2018 and for the publication, Elijah Watson complimented the opening keys as well as seeing the track as "redemptive and optimistic" enough to be "a shining light among the darkness" the rap scene was dominated by that year. The track was chosen as the 19th best song of 2018 by screenagers.pl, while Vice ranked it as the year's 20th best song. Complex listed the track as the 43rd best song of 2018; the magazine's Edwin Ortiz said Kids See Ghosts move "an extra step" towards establishing "new perspectives on maneuvering through hardships" with it. Even though he was impressed by West's verse due to the lyrics, Ortiz viewed it as inferior to Kid Cudi's "hook of the year contender" and "sobering realization" that represents change beginning from within, finishing his comments by expressing the feeling the song is "as therapeutic as it is inspirational". On an unsorted list, the GQ staff picked "Reborn" as one of their favorite songs of 2018. The listeners of Triple J voted the song as the 196th most popular of the year. In May 2020, Complex placed the song on their unordered list of rap's most motivational songs.

== Commercial performance ==
Upon the release of Kids See Ghosts, "Reborn" debuted at number 39 on the US Billboard Hot 100, making it the highest charting track from the album and the only one to reach the top 40 of the chart. The song further peaked at number 18 on the US Hot R&B/Hip-Hop Songs chart. On January 4, 2019, the song was certified gold by the Recording Industry Association of America (RIAA) for pushing 500,000 certified units in the United States, becoming the album's first track to achieve the certification. "Reborn" later received a platinum certification from the RIAA for reaching 1,000,000 certified units in the country.

In Canada, the song attained its highest chart position by reaching number 30 on the Canadian Hot 100. Elsewhere, "Reborn" entered Australia's ARIA Singles Chart at number 55. In Europe, the song experienced modest success. It peaked at number 35 on the Singlid tipp-40, becoming the only track from Kids See Ghosts to chart in Estonia. The song performed similarly in Greece, entering at number 37 on the Greece International Digital Singles chart and standing as the album's best performing track on the chart. "Reborn" further peaked within the top 60 in Slovakia, Ireland, the United Kingdom, and Portugal.

== Credits and personnel ==
Recording

- Recorded at West Lake Ranch, Jackson Hole, Wyoming

Personnel

- Kid Cudi – songwriter, production
- Dot da Genius – songwriter, production
- Evan Mast – songwriter, co-production
- Kanye West – songwriter
- Plain Pat – co-production
- Benny Blanco – additional production
- Andrew Dawson – engineer, mixer
- Zack Djurich – engineer
- Mike Malchicoff – engineer
- William J. Sullivan – engineer
- Thomas Cullison – engineer
- Noah Goldstein – engineer
- Jenna Felsenthal – assistant engineer
- Mike Dean – mixer
- Jess Jackson – mixer
- Sean Solymar – assistant mixer

Information taken from the Kids See Ghosts liner notes and Tidal.

== Charts ==
Chart performance for "Reborn"
Chart (2018)	Peak position
Australia (ARIA)	55
Canada (Canadian Hot 100)	30
Czech Republic Singles Digital (ČNS IFPI)	90
Estonia (Eesti Tipp-40)	35
France (SNEP)	165
Greece International Digital Singles (IFPI)	37
Ireland (IRMA)	48
New Zealand Heatseekers (RMNZ)	2
Portugal (AFP)	56
Slovakia Singles Digital (ČNS IFPI)	44
Swedish Heatseekers (Sverigetopplistan)	1
Switzerland (Schweizer Hitparade)	99
UK Singles (Official Charts)	48
UK Hip Hop/R&B (Official Charts)	27
US Billboard Hot 100	39
US Hot R&B/Hip-Hop Songs (Billboard)	18

== Certifications ==
Certifications and sales for "Reborn"
Region	Certification	Certified units/sales
United Kingdom (BPI)	Silver	200,000^{‡}
United States (RIAA)	Platinum	1,000,000^{‡}
^{‡} Sales+streaming figures based on certification alone.
