= Freeee (Ghost Town, Pt. 2) =

2018 song by Kids See Ghosts

Song by Kids See Ghosts featuring Ty Dolla Sign

from the album Kids See Ghosts
- Released: June 8, 2018
- Studio: West Lake Ranch, Jackson Hole, Wyoming
- Genre: Rap rock; psychedelic rock; psychedelia
- Length: 3:26
- Label: GOOD; Def Jam
- Songwriters: Kanye West; Scott Mescudi; Tyrone Griffin, Jr.; Mike Dean; Jeff Bhasker; Corin Littler
- Producers: Kanye West; Kid Cudi

Kids See Ghosts track listing
- 7 tracks: 1. "Feel the Love"; 2. "Fire"; 3. "4th Dimension"; 4. "Freeee (Ghost Town, Pt. 2)"; 5. "Reborn"; 6. "Kids See Ghosts"; 7. "Cudi Montage"

"Freeee (Ghost Town, Pt. 2)" is a song by American hip hop duo Kids See Ghosts, composed of the rappers Kanye West and Kid Cudi, from their first album Kids See Ghosts (2018). The song features a guest appearance from American musician Ty Dolla Sign. It is the sequel to West's song "Ghost Town" from his eighth studio album, Ye (2018). The first song "Ghost Town” was sung by West, PartyNextDoor and Kid Cudi. produced by West and Kid Cudi, with co-production from Mike Dean, Jeff Bhasker, and BoogzDaBeast, while additional production was handled by Andrew Dawson, Andy C, and Russell "Love" Crews. Apart from BoogzDaBeast, the lead and co-producers wrote the song alongside Ty Dolla Sign and Corin Littler, who has the stage name of Mr. Chop and received songwriting credit due to his work being sampled.

A rap rock number with psychedelic elements, "Freeee (Ghost Town, Pt. 2)" samples "Stark" by Mr. Chop and an excerpt of a speech by Marcus Garvey. In the lyrics, Kids See Ghosts demonstrate recovering from mental illness and represent liberation. The song received universal acclaim from music critics, who generally expressed highly positive opinions of the composition. Some praised the vocals, while other critics appreciated the song's creativity. It was submitted for the 61st Annual Grammy Awards, though ultimately failed to receive any nominations at the ceremony.

"Freeee (Ghost Town, Pt. 2)" charted at number 62 on the US Billboard Hot 100, while it reached number 58 on the Canadian Hot 100. The duo and Ty Dolla Sign performed the song at the Coachella Valley Music and Arts Festival in 2019. Ronald Oslin Bobb-Semple issued a lawsuit over the song in March 2019, pressing the accusation of exploiting "The Spirit of Marcus Garvey (Garvey speaks to an all-Black audience)" without permission or payment. Kids See Ghosts and their co-defendants responded three months later, arguing fair use and that there was nothing wrong with the duo's actions, later reaching a settlement with Bobb-Semple in January 2020.

== Background and development ==
On April 19, 2018, Kanye West announced a collaborative album with Kid Cudi. The album was revealed as being titled Kids See Ghosts by West, with him setting its release date as June 8, 2018. Kid Cudi had been featured on a number of tracks by West prior to the announcement, including "Welcome to Heartbreak" (2008) and "Gorgeous" (2010). West released his eighth studio album Ye on June 1, 2018, with vocals from Kid Cudi included on the tracks "No Mistakes" and "Ghost Town". The album also features additional vocals from Ty Dolla Sign on "All Mine", "Wouldn't Leave" and "Violent Crimes". On June 4, 2018, the musician teased a joint album with West. The rapper had expressed a desire to collaborate on an album four days previously, calling himself and Ty Dolla Sign "one of the best combinations ever" while affirming that he is simply "trying to go week after week and improve on the craft". West elaborated, naming the collaborator among "the strongest artists we have living" and admitting that "anything I can do to support, get around, produce, take my hands and chop up I'm with it". Ty Dolla Sign later recalled "going off on the backgrounds, no Auto-Tune" when working with West in a phone conversation with Rolling Stone on August 30, 2018. West went on to contribute a feature to his single "Ego Death", released in July 2020.

"Freeee (Ghost Town, Pt. 2)" serves as the sequel to "Ghost Town", but credits Kids See Ghosts as the lead performers and Ty Dolla Sign as a featured artist. This differs from the prequel crediting West as the lead artist and Kid Cudi, PartyNextDoor, and 070 Shake as additional vocalists. The titles of Kids See Ghosts and the track, respectively, are part of a "spooky-ghost routine" that is continued from "Ghost Town"; the album also includes a song of the same name. "Freeee (Ghost Town, Pt. 2)" includes an interpolation of lyrics from the song. Fellow album track "4th Dimension" also shows continuity of the prequel, with both of the tracks sampling gospel singer Shirley Ann Lee's "Someday". Prior to combining rap and rock, both members of Kids See Ghosts had shown admiration for guitar artists. The genres had previously been compared by West in an interview with BBC Radio 1 host Zane Lowe, during which he said of rappers: "We the new rock stars and I'm the biggest of all of them!" West rapped nonsense words on his single "Lift Yourself" in April 2018, before he re-used the song's "whoop! Scoop!" phrases on GOOD Music president Pusha T's "What Would Meek Do?" the following month. "Freeee (Ghost Town, Pt. 2)" was produced by West and Kid Cudi, while co-produced by Mike Dean, Jeff Bhasker, and BoogzDaBeast, with additional production being handled by Andrew Dawson alongside Andy C and Russell "Love" Crews. The lead producers and co-producers, with the exception of BoogzDaBeast, co-wrote the track with Ty Dolla Sign and Corin Littler; the latter of the two is known under the stage name of Mr. Chop and was credited as a songwriter due to his recording "Stark" (2008) being sampled. The sampling of Mr. Chop stood among West's numerous samples taken from the record label Now-Again Records in the Summer of 2018.

== Composition and lyrics ==
"Freeee (Ghost Town, Pt. 2)"
A 19-second snippet of "Freeee (Ghost Town, Pt. 2)", featuring West and Ty Dolla Sign trading vocals alongside drums and an electric guitar riff that is added from the chopped up sample of Mr. Chop's "Stark". The lyrical content addresses liberation, while the word "free" is stretched out vocally with excess e's for echoing the title of the song and it also has reverberation added.

Musically, "Freeee (Ghost Town, Pt. 2)" is a rap rock number, with psychedelic elements. The song is built around a chopped up sample of "Stark", written and performed by Mr. Chop. An electric guitar riff is taken from the recording. For the intro of the song, an excerpt from a speech by black nationalist Marcus Garvey is sampled alongside "Stark". According to Spin's Zoe Camp, Garvey's proclamation "lays the track's liberating themes bare". Drums are heavily featured, which are distorted. The song also includes percussion, a cello, and an acoustic guitar; the latter of the three was played by Zack Djurich. It contains voice modulation, as well as off-key cries. West and Kid Cudi trade turns to perform for the chorus, which includes the former of the two yelling. They are followed by Ty Dolla Sign and a gospel choir, with him harmonizing as the song's beat drops out.

In the lyrics of "Freeee (Ghost Town, Pt. 2)", Kids See Ghosts demonstrate the recovery from mental illness and showcase liberation. On the chorus, a message of it being acceptable to not feel okay is conveyed. "Nothing hurts me anymore / Guess what, baby? I feel freeeee", proclaim both members of Kids See Ghosts separately, interpolating 070 Shake's lyrics "And nothing hurts any more / I feel kind of free" from "Ghost Town", as well as representing freedom in a triumphant moment. The word "free" is stretched out vocally through extra e's being used to echo the song title, with reverberation being applied to it. West re-uses the nonsensical "Scoop!" phrase from "Lift Yourself", shouting it on the song.

== Release and promotion ==
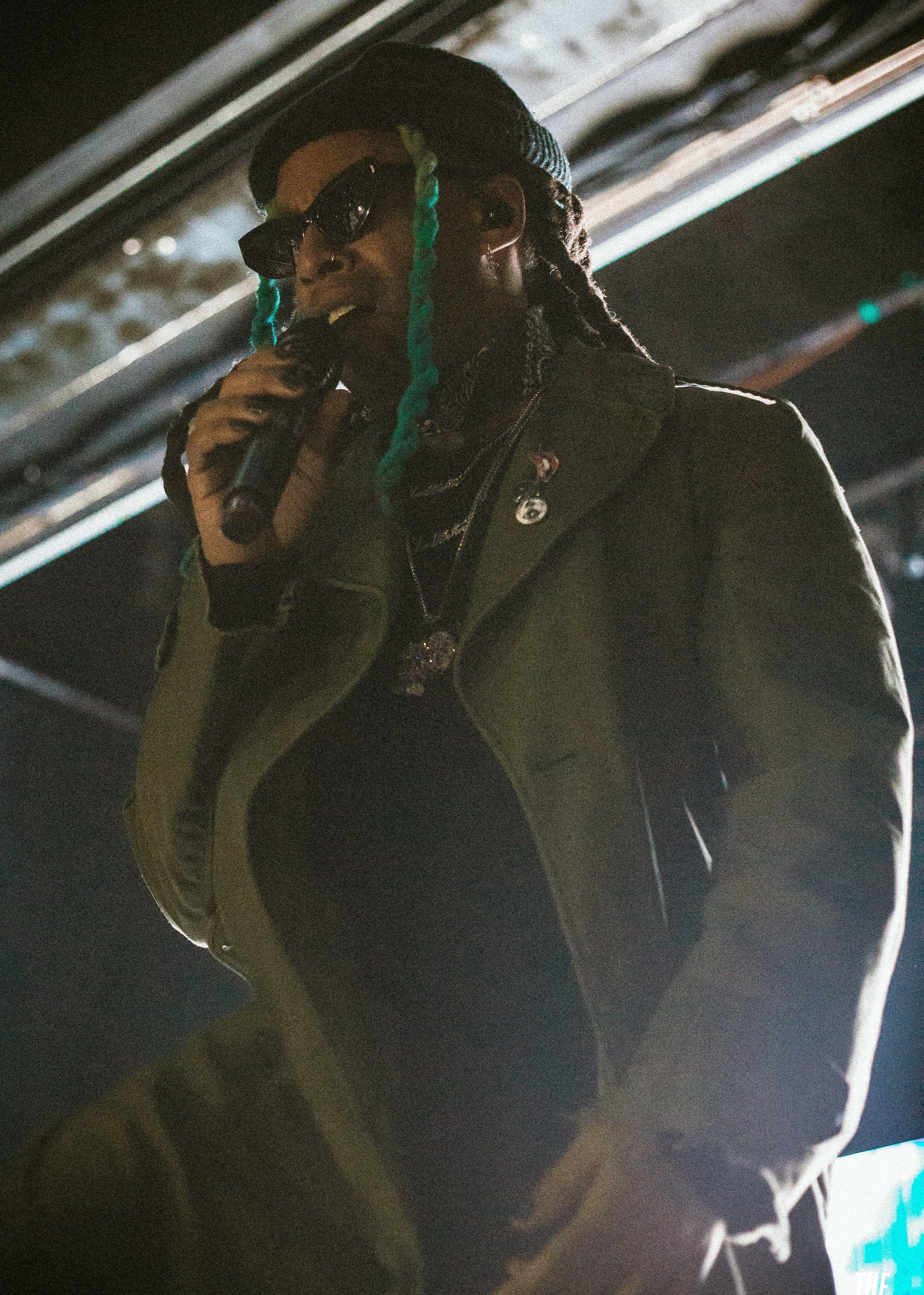
Ty Dolla Sign accompanied Kids See Ghosts for their performance of the song at the Coachella Valley Music and Arts Festival in 2019.

"Freeee (Ghost Town, Pt. 2)" replaced "Ghost Town" as the fourth track on Kids See Ghosts' eponymous debut studio album, released on June 8, 2018. On the day of the album's release, multiple tracks were mislabeled on streaming services as the result of a technical error, though "Freeee (Ghost Town, Pt. 2)" was the exception to the error. As part of their first show billed as Kids See Ghosts, the duo delivered a performance of the song at the 2018 Camp Flog Gnaw Carnival. The song was the fifth track of their set, though it was the fourth track that they released under the Kids See Ghosts moniker to be performed. The duo were backed by visuals that featured pulsating bright colors for their performance inside a transparent box, and rapper Tyler, the Creator sang along with the line "I feel freeeee" while in the crowd. Kids See Ghosts went on to perform "Ghost Town" as the closer to their set, during which the crowd sang along with the line "I feel kinda free." For Kid Cudi's weekend two set at the 2019 Coachella Music Festival, he brought out West at the Sahara Tent as a surprise. They were joined by Ty Dolla Sign to perform a rendition of "Freeee (Ghost Town, Pt. 2)", with Kid Cudi taking running jumps across the stage at multiple points. After the performance, Kids See Ghosts delivered a rendition of "Ghost Town".

== Critical reception ==
The song was met with universal acclaim from music critics, with strong praise for the composition. Jack Hamilton of Slate categorized the song as the "most fun and exuberant track" on Kids See Ghosts, labeling it heavily comparable to English musician David Bowie's work because of the "booming walls of vocals, gnashing distortion, and thundering drums". Christopher R. Weingarten of Rolling Stone expressed certainty in "Freeee (Ghost Town, Pt. 2)" being "fantastic", hailing it as "gorgeously arranged" like tracks on West's fifth studio album My Beautiful Dark Twisted Fantasy (2010) "with a more spontaneous feel". Writing for Entertainment Weekly, Chuck Arnold voiced a similar viewpoint; he remarked that the song "is the [same] type of wide-screen soundscape" as the album's tracks, while also stating there is "a liberating rush" from being able to feel "demons being kicked to the curb". Spencer Kornhaber from The Atlantic commented how the song and "Ghost Town" are "a duo" that he considered to be the standout tracks of their respective albums, noticing the songs "roil with peeling guitar, off-key yowls, and drunken drumming". Kornhaber further praised the song for building on "a crunchy funk-rock tune from [...] Mr. Chop", alongside highlighting Ty Dolla Sign's performance and West's vocals that differ from his.

NPR's Sidney Madden wrote Mr. Chop's sampled "soaring electric guitar riff" backs the "declarations of freedom" from West and Kid Cudi on "Freeee (Ghost Town, Pt. 2)" that "erupt into an all-out rebel yell", as well as commenting how the sample resembles "fuzzed-out psychedelic rock of the '70s". At Pitchfork, Jayson Greene said that while "a buzzing cello pecks at its tendons and the distorted drums smash into bone" on the song, the listener is left with contemplation of "the scary sort of freedom West prizes". He elaborated, noting it is "the freedom of mania" where you allow your mind to "gallop off its leash in as many directions at once" and that the song can give anyone with experience of this type of freedom "a pang of recognition in this exhilaration". For The Guardian, Dean Van Nguyen assured the song is the "undoubted centrepiece" of Kids See Ghosts, analyzing that it is "an acid-laced trip into bohemian spiritualism". Van Nguyen admitted that with rap rock crossovers being generally "execrable", he cannot envision West making the song "without Cudi in the booth to summon the spirit of flower power". NME critic Jordan Bassett picked the "defiant" interpolation of "Ghost Town" on the chorus as a stand out on the album.

For Exclaim!, Riley Wallace stated the song fully shows West and Kid Cudi on "their journeys to bettering themselves" via "the power of positivity" as "the two notoriously creative, controversial and often elusive artists" seem to shed "the demons, shackles and negativity" that troubles them. He continued, analyzing that the duo move forward "with a clear state of mind", and noticing their "childlike innocence and fearlessness". In The A.V. Club, Marty Sartini Garner called the song a "barbaric yawp" that continues "Ghost Town" and "aims to blast through any ambiguities", noting both members of Kids See Ghosts "sound as big and bold and alive as they ever have". He went on to highlight the beat's "brash power" for coming across "like an exclamation point at the end of a very long and digressive sentence", though was unhappy with the intention of it being "seen as a statement" due to it feeling "hard to shake the idea that you're joining in a dubious celebration" because West is unclear about what he's free from.

=== Accolades ===
NME ranked "Freeee (Ghost Town, Pt. 2)" as the 20th best song of 2018, with the publication's Dan Stubbs hailing it as a "standout track" from West's Wyoming Sessions. (Note: Pusha T's Daytona, West's Ye, Kids See Ghosts, Nas' Nasir, and Teyana Taylor's K.T.S.E.) He further called the track "an empowering blast of booming vocals, thunderous drums" and West's "liberal shouts" of "Scoop!", arguing that the use of the catchphrase may be West's "most admirable contribution to 2018's cultural melee". It was listed as the 98th best song of 2018 by Spin, while also being named by The Guardian music journalist Harriet Gibsone as one of the best tracks of the year. In July 2020, Cool Accidents placed Ty Dolla Sign's appearance among his 11 best guest features. On October 25, 2018, it was reported that West's team had submitted the song for consideration in the categories of Best Rock Song and Best Rock Performance at the 61st Annual Grammy Awards. According to TMZ, the song had already gone through the screening process for the categories at the time and "since been sent out on the first round ballot to voters", with the submissions awaiting enough support to be nominated. However, the song was ultimately nominated in neither of the categories at the ceremony.

== Commercial performance ==
Upon the release of Kids See Ghosts, "Freeee (Ghost Town, Pt. 2)" entered the US Billboard Hot 100 at number 62. Simultaneously, the song debuted at number 30 on the US Hot R&B/Hip-Hop Songs chart. In Canada, it peaked at number 58 on the Canadian Hot 100. Elsewhere, the song reached number 72 in Australia on the ARIA Singles Chart. It further charted at numbers 66 and 72 on the Irish Singles Chart and Singles Digitál Top 100 in Ireland and Slovakia, respectively.

== Controversy ==
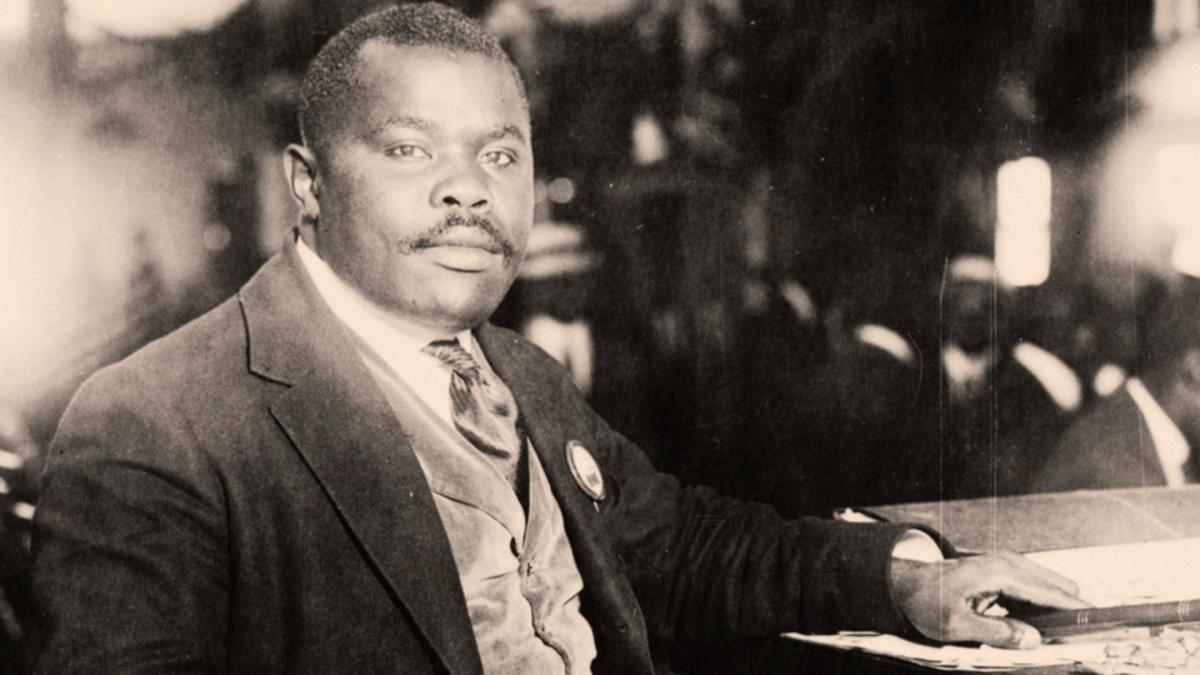
Ronald Oslin Bobb-Semple launched a lawsuit over the song's sampling of a Marcus Garvey speech.

On March 7, 2019, Ronald Oslin Bobb-Semple sued the duo, Ty Dolla Sign, and record labels Def Jam and Universal Music for the song's alleged sampling of his recording "The Spirit of Marcus Garvey (Garvey speaks to an all-Black audience)" (2002). Court documents obtained by The Blast and TMZ saw him accuse them of exploitation of "the actual voice, words and performance" with lack of authorization or monetary compensation and state that he hadn't been given any of the profit made from "Freeee (Ghost Town, Pt. 2)". Bobb-Semple further noted Kids See Ghosts and Ty Dolla Sign had received "substantial profits", and that he wanted a "fair cut". The damages sought by Bobb-Semple were reportedly unspecified and a warning was sent out to Kids See Ghosts, Ty Dolla Sign, and the record labels to prevent them from still profiting off his work. At the time, neither of the two artists had issued any comments about his lawsuit.

Kids See Ghosts went on to file a legal response to the lawsuit on June 4, 2019, with various co-defendants for their response, including Ty Dolla Sign, Def Jam, Universal Music, and West's record label GOOD Music. Bobb-Semple's infringement claim was denied by the defendants, with them asserting that the usage of the sample does actually classify as fair use despite not having obtained authorization to use it. They continued, arguing that even if copyright infringement was present, Kids See Ghosts' actions were "innocent and non-willful", and pointed out Bobb-Semple not having provided any facts to support the duo's "alleged willfulness". Kids See Ghosts made the accusation of Bobb-Semple's original complaint being "barred by the First Amendment to the United States Constitution" and characterized him as misusing copyright. West demanded for the case to be thrown out of court. It has been shown by West that he is not opposed to giving credit where it is due, with him having reached out to the estate of Louis Prima to clear a sample for "4th Dimension". In January 2020, the parties reached a settlement regarding the lawsuit.

== Credits and personnel ==
Recording

- Recorded at West Lake Ranch, Jackson Hole, Wyoming.

Personnel

- Kanye West – songwriter, production
- Kid Cudi – songwriter, production
- Mike Dean – songwriter, co-production, mixer
- Jeff Bhasker – songwriter, co-production
- Ty Dolla Sign – songwriter, featured artist
- Corbin Littler – songwriter
- BoogzDaBeast – co-production
- Andrew Dawson – additional production, engineer
- Andy C – additional production
- Russel "Love" Crews – additional production
- Zack Djurich – engineer, acoustic guitar
- Mike Malchicoff – engineer
- William J. Sullivan – engineer
- Nicolo Aglietti – engineer, Fender Jaguar electric guitar, sound effects and dubbing, production
- Jenna Felsenthal – assistant engineer
- Jess Jackson – mixer
- Sean Solymar – assistant mixer

Information taken from the Kids See Ghosts liner notes and Tidal.

== Charts ==
Chart performance for "Freeee (Ghost Town, Pt. 2)"
Chart (2018)	Peak position
Australia (ARIA)	72
Canada (Canadian Hot 100)	58
Ireland (IRMA)	66
Slovakia Singles Digital (ČNS IFPI)	86
UK Audio Streaming (Official Charts)	78
US Billboard Hot 100	62
US Hot R&B/Hip-Hop Songs (Billboard)	30

== See also ==
- Lift Yourself
