= Cudi Montage =

2018 song by Kids See Ghosts

Song by Kids See Ghosts

from the album Kids See Ghosts
- Released: June 8, 2018
- Recorded: 2017 – June 2018
- Studio: West Lake Ranch, Jackson Hole, Wyoming
- Genre: Electro-gospel
- Length: 3:17
- Label: GOOD; Def Jam
- Songwriters: Kanye West; Scott Mescudi; Mike Dean; Kurt Cobain
- Producers: Kid Cudi; Dot da Genius

Kids See Ghosts track listing
- 7 tracks: 1. "Feel the Love"; 2. "Fire"; 3. "4th Dimension"; 4. "Freeee (Ghost Town, Pt. 2)"; 5. "Reborn"; 6. "Kids See Ghosts"; 7. "Cudi Montage"

"Cudi Montage" is a song by American hip hop duo Kids See Ghosts, composed of Kanye West and Kid Cudi, released as the final track on their eponymous debut studio album (2018). The song was produced by Kid Cudi and Dot da Genius, with co-production from Mike Dean. The song also features vocals from Mr Hudson. Dot da Genius recorded with Kids See Ghosts in 2018, and he recalled West as unifying him and Kid Cudi's musical interests. An electro-gospel track with rock influences, the song samples Kurt Cobain's unreleased track "Burn the Rain". In the lyrics of the song, Kids See Ghosts pledge to not repeat past mistakes. Lyrics of the song are reused from the demo version of Travis Scott's song "Skeletons", which features West and was recorded during the Ye sessions.

The song received universal acclaim from music critics, who mostly complimented West's vocal performance. They were often appreciative of his lyricism, while some critics praised the sample of "Burn the Rain" and a few named "Cudi Montage" one of the highlights of Kids See Ghosts. The song reached number 69 on the US Billboard Hot 100 and also appeared on the charts in Australia, Canada, and Ireland. It has been certified gold in the United States by the Recording Industry Association of America (RIAA). Kids See Ghosts performed it live at the Camp Flog Gnaw Carnival in 2018, with West forgetting certain lyrics while performing.

== Background and development ==
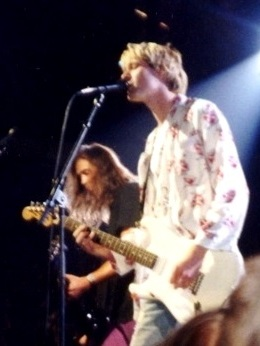
The song posthumously samples "Burn the Rain" by Kurt Cobain (front), whose work Kid Cudi thought to sample and approval was received from his family members.

On April 19, 2018, Kanye West announced a collaborative album with Kid Cudi. The album was revealed as being titled Kids See Ghosts by West, with him proposing the release date of June 8, 2018. Kid Cudi had been featured on numerous tracks by West prior to the announcement, including "Welcome to Heartbreak" (2008) and "Gorgeous" (2010). West released his eighth studio album Ye on June 1, 2018, with vocals from Kid Cudi included on the tracks "No Mistakes" and "Ghost Town". After contributing production to the former of the two tracks in Wyoming, American record producer Dot da Genius helped produce the Kids See Ghosts songs "Cudi Montage" and "Reborn" while he was in the state during 2018. The producer was studying at college when he first met Kid Cudi in 2007, recalling in a 2018 interview that he was getting into production at the time and the rapper "came by my studio setup in my parents' living room". Though Dot da Genius said their "immediate vibe" continued from the meeting onwards, he admitted West "was a very big unifier in our interests as musicians" while viewing him as "on another level and we both took notice". Speaking of recording with Kids See Ghosts in Wyoming, Dot da Genius explained that he "just tried to make everything as epic sounding as possible" and lauded the duo as "two of the best". According to him, anything mediocre will not work for the two "and they will definitely let you know"; he also recounted that Kids See Ghosts is "a blessing to be a part of, and I know the music will help people". The song was produced by Kid Cudi and Dot da Genius, while co-produced by Mike Dean. It stands along with "Reborn" as one of the two tracks on Kids See Ghosts to not feature production from West.

"Cudi Montage" posthumously samples Nirvana frontman Kurt Cobain's home recording "Burn the Rain" from the 1990s, which was officially released in 2015 as part of the compilation album Montage of Heck: The Home Recordings. Kid Cudi said in a July 2018 Billboard cover story that although the sample was the one on Kids See Ghosts he was most worried about, Kurt's widow Courtney Love and his daughter Frances Bean Cobain were "really cool and they cleared it". The rapper asserted he "love[s] them both for that" and that Love informed him she doesn't "clear shit for just anybody", which he heavily recognized while expressing strong gratitude. In an October 2018 GQ interview, Kid Cudi believes that Kids See Ghosts were working on the song while touring when he came up with the idea of sampling Kurt Cobain and remembers himself "sitting with this idea for the longest", but not knowing "if it would be any good". The member confesses to being unsure if the idea would work until he presented it to Dot da Genius in a way, following this by telling him how he wanted to chop up the Cobain sample, before his engineer William J. Sullivan deployed the technique. Kid Cudi recalls that after this, "we added drums to it, and then it just kind of, came out like that", describing the idea as "a beautiful marriage". He elaborates, "Everything came together and to have Kanye on it, really just takes it to another level." Kid Cudi does state West was uncertain due to having more material on his laptop while he believed in the "one joint"; the former of the two cites Nirvana as an influence, especially Cobain.

The song sampling Cobain's material does not mark the only time a posthumous artist is sampled on the album, as the track "4th Dimension" samples the work of Louis Prima; contrary to "Cudi Montage", he is credited as a featured artist on the track. Similarly to West and Kid Cudi, Cobain had struggled with mental illness during his lifetime. Kid Cudi had shown his admiration of Cobain in 2011, making a visit to the musician's unofficial memorial at Viretta Park in Seattle, Washington. West had also acknowledged Cobain in the past, once comparing himself to the musician.

== Composition and lyrics ==
"Cudi Montage"
A 19-second snippet of "Cudi Montage", featuring West rapping about different types of violence within black communities in his verse alongside a chopped up sample of the guitar riff from Cobain's home recording "Burn the Rain". West finishes the verse by referencing Alice Johnson, who was freed from jail in 2018 after serving 21 years when Kim Kardashian was successful in lobbying for her release. Kardashian met with Donald Trump to organize the release, and West expresses hope in the lyrics that Johnson "will inspire men".

Musically, "Cudi Montage" is an electro-gospel track, with rock influences. It contains a chopped-up sample of the guitar riff from "Burn the Rain" throughout, written and performed by Cobain, with the sample including guitar strums. Michelle Kim of Pitchfork described the use of the sample as "pointed", due to Kids See Ghosts largely dealing with overcoming depression. She explained this is because Cobain died from suicide, adding that "it's also an especially fitting pairing for Kid Cudi, who [...] has embraced his inner angsty rock star since long before such influences were de rigueur in rap". The sample is utilized at the start of the song heavily, becoming less prominent as the chorus approaches. First drums, then synths are added alongside the sample as the guitar gradually fades, being used to "soften the song". Bass is also laid over the guitar riff. The chorus of the song is performed by Kid Cudi, and it is powered by synths. West delivers his verse after Kid Cudi's chorus, with the verse lasting until around two minutes into the song.

Lyrically, the track is a pledge from Kids See Ghosts to avoid repeating past mistakes, with both of the members looking towards faith for overcoming life's struggles. In Kid Cudi's verse, he delivers remarks on the process of his fractured mind being restructured. West uses his verse to rap about cycles of violence in black communities and the pain of loss as he comes to realization with the effects of police brutality, incarceration, and mass shootings on the black community, concluding with a reference to Alice Johnson, an African-American woman jailed for life over a non-violent drug offence and whose sentence was ended in 2018 after 21 years by US president Donald Trump at the suggestion of the rapper's wife Kim Kardashian. For the chorus, Kid Cudi repeatedly sings "stay strong" and "save me, Lord". During the outro of the song, a call and response sees West sing "Lord shine your light on me, save me please", with Kid Cudi and a backing vocalist responding by imploring to "stay strong" as the latter of the two rappers hums.

== Release and promotion ==
"Cudi Montage" was released on June 8, 2018, as the seventh and final track on Kids See Ghosts' eponymous debut studio album. The song switched from its originally slated position as the fifth track, which West revealed on May 15, 2018, when he shared an initial track list for the album. On the day of the album's release, multiple tracks were labeled incorrectly on streaming services because of a technical error, which included "Cudi Montage" being mislabeled as the third track on Kids See Ghosts, "4th Dimension". During their first show billed as Kids See Ghosts, the duo performed the song live at the 2018 Camp Flog Gnaw Carnival. The song was the eighth track of their set, though it was the last track that they released as Kids See Ghosts to be performed. While performing his verse from the song, West forgot several lyrics.

== Reception ==
"Cudi Montage" was met with universal acclaim from music critics, with general praise for West's verse. Israel Daramola of Spin considered the song a "melancholy finale" to Kids See Ghosts, highlighting the "quavering vulnerability" of the duo's vocal performances while also complimenting the sample of Cobain's "Burn the Rain" for being among what "makes the album work as brilliantly as it does". Multiple critics say that Kanye’s repeatedly said chorus “Shining light on me” sounds similar to New Orleans based rapper Lil Wayne. Eoin Donnelly, writing for The Line of Best Fit, honored West's performance on the track as "one of his best verses in years", feeling that the verse provides "a glimpse of something resembling the 'old Kanye'" and believing the older version of West "uses the power of his voice for the good of his community". Pitchfork editor Jayson Greene wrote that with its empathy, the song "relocates a precious, nearly vanished quantity of Kanye's music" and called West's verse one of his "most sustained efforts to imagine someone else's life" since his performance on the single "All of the Lights" (2010). The Guardian's Dean Van Nguyen wrote that West's lyricism "lays out a brutal cycle of violence and the pain of loss" while highlighting his "palpable" spirit for being reminiscent of when West "decried the capitalist grind" on "Spaceship" from his debut studio album The College Dropout (2004), and "called out" US president George W. Bush live on television. In a review of the album for Billboard, Eric Diep picked the song as one of the highlights and specifically praised Kid Cudi's "soaring" hook as well as West's lyrical style, commending the latter's reflectiveness.

Jack Hamilton from Slate decided the song is Kids See Ghosts' "prettiest and most affecting moment", analyzing that the "Burn the Rain" sample "gradually recedes as Cudi moves from his opening verse to the chorus", which he said features "cavernous, incantatory repetition". Hamilton further wrote that West's verse is "a murky but heartfelt rumination on violence" and called the remainder of the song after his performance "gorgeous, a soaring mass of voices and textures and chord changes that seem to move within their own incontestable logic". NME's Jordan Bassett glorified the call-and-response between the line "Lord shine your light on me" and the "Stay strong" vocals as the "stand-out moment" on the album, alongside directing praise towards the song's "calming wash of synth". At The A.V. Club, Marty Sartini Garner described the song as sampling "the detuned gloom" of "Burn the Rain" and made the observation that the sample is patiently overwhelmed "with daybreaking synths and a bright harmony vocal", finishing by liking the song being "a perfect capstone to a complex record". Entertainment Weekly reviewer Chuck Arnold stated Kid Cudi "offers encouragement to himself and others to 'stay strong'", and explained that despite it being "eerie" for Cobain to be sampled on the song after he "died by suicide", the sampling "leaves us with a message that, powerful in its simplicity, is as exceptional as the music".

After the release of Kids See Ghosts, "Cudi Montage" debuted at number 69 on the US Billboard Hot 100. Simultaneously, it entered the US Hot R&B/Hip-Hop Songs chart at number 34. On July 9, 2021, "Cudi Montage" was certified gold by the Recording Industry Association of America (RIAA) for pushing 500,000 certified units in the United States. Elsewhere in North America, the song reached number 61 on the Canadian Hot 100. In Australia, the song charted at number 89 on the ARIA Singles Chart. It further reached number 67 on the Irish Singles Chart.

== Credits and personnel ==
Recording

- Recorded at West Lake Ranch, Jackson Hole, Wyoming

Personnel

- Kid Cudi – songwriter, production
- Mike Dean – songwriter, co-production, mixer
- Kanye West – songwriter
- Kurt Cobain – songwriter
- Dot da Genius – production
- Zack Djurich – engineer
- Mike Malchicoff – engineer
- William J. Sullivan – engineer
- Noah Goldstein – engineer
- Jenna Felsenthal – assistant engineer
- Jess Jackson – mixer
- Sean Solymar – assistant mixer

Information taken from the Kids See Ghosts liner notes and Tidal.

== Charts ==
Chart performance for "Cudi Montage"
Chart (2018)	Peak position
Australia (ARIA)	89
Canada (Canadian Hot 100)	61
Ireland (IRMA)	67
UK Audio Streaming (Official Charts)	85
US Billboard Hot 100	69
US Hot R&B/Hip-Hop Songs (Billboard)	34

== Certifications ==
Certifications and sales for "Cudi Montage"
Region	Certification	Certified units/sales
United States (RIAA)	Gold	500,000^{‡}
^{‡} Sales+streaming figures based on certification alone.
