= Fire (Kids See Ghosts song) =

2018 song by Kids See Ghosts

Song by Kids See Ghosts

from the album Kids See Ghosts
- Released: June 8, 2018
- Studio: West Lake Ranch, Jackson Hole, Wyoming
- Genre: Rock
- Length: 2:21
- Label: GOOD; Def Jam
- Songwriters: Kanye West; Scott Mescudi; Evan Mast; André Benjamin
- Producers: Kanye West; Kid Cudi; BoogzDaBeast; André 3000

Kids See Ghosts track listing
- 7 tracks: 1. "Feel the Love"; 2. "Fire"; 3. "4th Dimension"; 4. "Freeee (Ghost Town, Pt. 2)"; 5. "Reborn"; 6. "Kids See Ghosts"; 7. "Cudi Montage"

"Fire" is a song by American hip hop duo Kids See Ghosts, composed of the rappers Kanye West and Kid Cudi, from their only studio album (2018). West, Kid Cudi, BoogzDaBeast, and André 3000 produced the song, while additional production was handled by Evan Mast. Written by the producers with the exception of BoogzDaBeast, it is a rock-influenced track that includes a sample of Napoleon XIV's "They're Coming to Take Me Away, Ha-Haaa!". In the lyrics, Kids See Ghosts refuse to let haunting demons define them.

"Fire" received generally positive reviews from music critics, with several of them praising the production. Some were complementary towards the lyrical content, while numerous critics positively compared the song to Kid Cudi's earlier works. It peaked at number 67 on the US Billboard Hot 100, alongside reaching the charts in Australia, Canada, Ireland, and Slovakia. In 2018, Kids See Ghosts performed the song at the Camp Flog Gnaw Carnival.

== Background ==
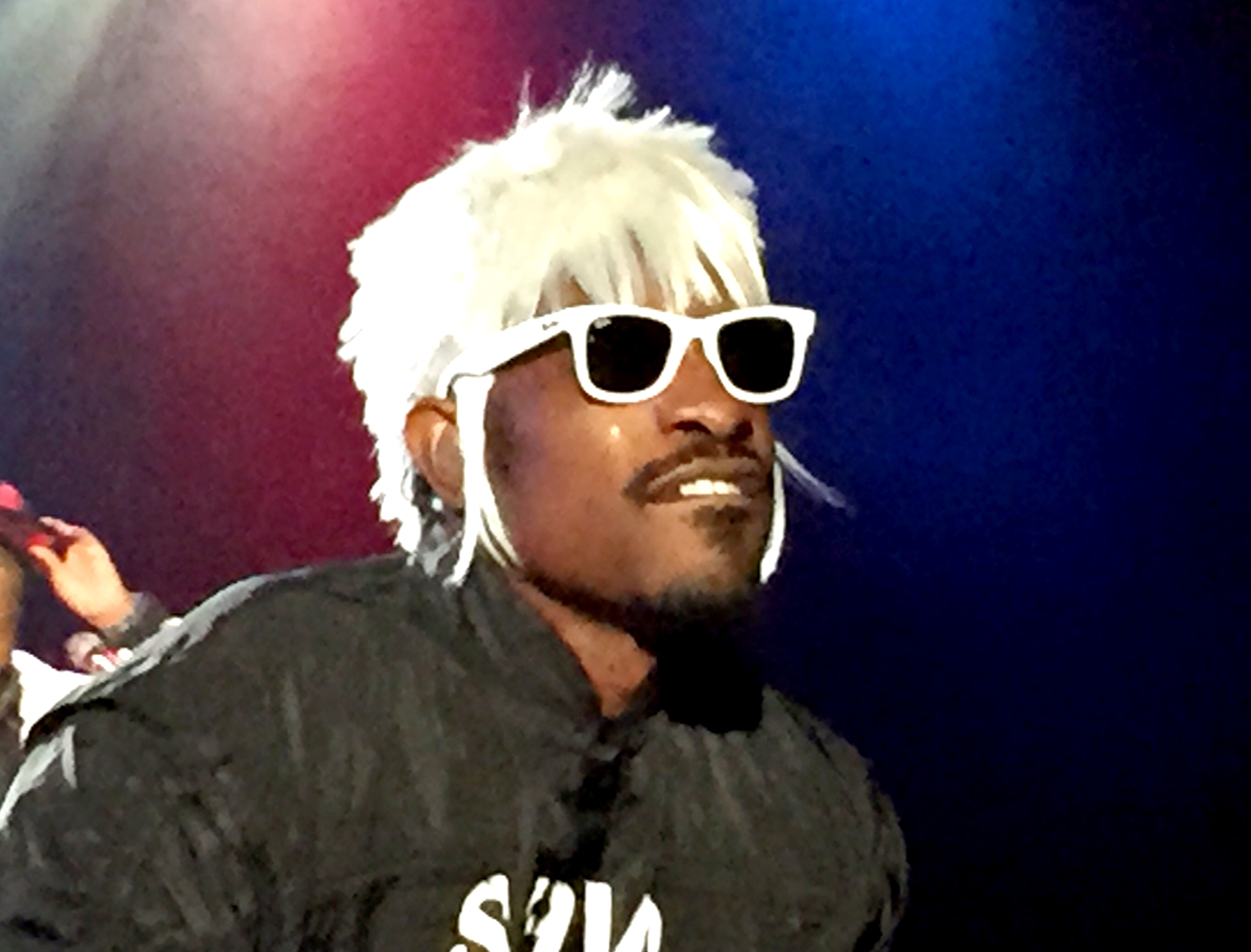
After having worked with both members of Kids See Ghosts separately in the past, American rapper André 3000 contributed to the song's writing and production.

On April 19, 2018, Kanye West announced a collaborative album with Kid Cudi under the title of Kids See Ghosts, with him setting the release date of June 8, 2018 for it. Kid Cudi had been featured on a number of tracks by West prior to the announcement, including "Welcome to Heartbreak" (2008) and "Gorgeous" (2010). West released his eighth studio album Ye on June 1, 2018, with the tracks "No Mistakes" and "Ghost Town" including vocals from Kid Cudi.

"Fire" was produced by West, Kid Cudi, BoogzDaBeast, and André 3000, with additional production from Evan Mast. With the exception of BoogzDaBeast, the producers wrote the song. Prior to working with Kids See Ghosts on the song, André 3000 provided vocals for "30 Hours" from West's seventh studio album The Life of Pablo in 2016. That same year, André 3000 was featured on the tracks "By Design" and "The Guide" from Kid Cudi's sixth studio album Passion, Pain & Demon Slayin'. BoogzDaBeast contributed production to the compilation album Cruel Summer (2012), which was released under West and Kid Cudi's record label GOOD Music. "Fire" was recorded at West Lake Ranch in Jackson Hole, Wyoming, with it being engineered by Zack Djurich, Mike Malchicoff, and William J. Sullivan. The song was mixed by Mike Dean and Jess Jackson, while Sean Solymar assisted in the mix.

== Composition and lyrics ==
Musically, "Fire" was described in press reviews as a rock influenced track. The song contains a sample of "They're Coming to Take Me Away, Ha-Haaa!" (1966) by Napoleon XIV. From the recording, the drums and a rhythmic excerpt are sampled. The song combines the drums with a guitar, the latter of which is looped at the beginning, and a tambourine is played throughout. After the loop, Kid Cudi hums. West raps first on the song with an angry flow, being followed by Kid Cudi.

Lyrically, "Fire" sees Kids See Ghosts refuse to let themselves be defined by the demons that haunt them. West also uses the lyrics to lash out at his haters. Kid Cudi's performance has a spiritual message, starting with him rapping: "It's so many days I prayed to God." He also dismisses judgement and raps reflectively. For the song's outro, Kid Cudi offers, "Heaven lift me up."

== Release and promotion ==
"Fire" was released on June 8, 2018, as the second track on Kids See Ghosts' eponymous debut studio album. The song was not included on the track list originally shared by West on May 15 of that year, though the position of the second track was initially set to be taken up by "Kids See Ghosts". On the day of the album's release, multiple tracks were mislabeled on streaming services as a result of a technical error, including "Fire" being mislabeled as the sixth track on Kids See Ghosts, "Kids See Ghosts". For their first show billed as Kids See Ghosts, the duo performed the song at the 2018 Camp Flog Gnaw Carnival. Though it was the third track of their set, the song stood as the second track to be performed that was released by them under the moniker of Kids See Ghosts. For the performance, Kids See Ghosts were inside a transparent box, which they danced inside. As the duo performed, jets of flame shot up from the stage below that illuminated the box.

== Reception ==
"Fire" was met with generally positive reviews from music critics, who mostly praised the production. Writing for AllMusic, Neil Z. Yeung called the production of the song a "Gorillaz-esque stomp." Vulture's Craig Jenkins wrote that the song sees West "blasting rails and lashing out at haters," stating his performance is followed by Kid Cudi offering "an earnest invocation." Jenkins elaborated, pointing out how "music that can turn from bliss to rage on a dime" aids "good-cop, bad-cop approach" on the song and concluded by branding it "a devilish drum-and-guitar stomp" that sounds like "Revofev" from Kid Cudi's second studio album Man on the Moon II: The Legend of Mr. Rager (2010) "descending into a riot." On a similar note, Micah Peters of The Ringer analyzed that the song's production "recalls the same one horse town on Mars vibes" of "Revofev" and the rapper's collaboration "She Came Along" with Sharam. Stereogum critic Tom Breihan noted that the song is an example of Kid Cudi speaking "in self-improvement aphorisms" on Kids See Ghosts, while asserting he "uses the bluesy croak in his voice to its maximum effect." Breihan continued, opining that the song sounds like a version of West's single "Black Skinhead" (2013) with Kid Cudi "rapping over the martial lockstep drums from Napoleon XIV's 'They're Coming to Take Me Away, Ha-Haaa!'." Chuck Arnold from Entertainment Weekly cited the lyrical content as giving him hope that Kids See Ghosts "have rid themselves of enough ghosts to bust out more of" the type of artistry demonstrated on the album. In a less enthusiastic review for musicOMH, Ben Devlin noted that the song's "proggy beat" shows the rock influence of Kid Cudi's recent projects. He criticized the song for "[stumbling] into a verse that ends before it really begins" and "[breaking] into a completely unrelated outro" following one chorus, while complaining that it "deserved more" with "production as nice as it is" and adding "such a scattershot approach seems to be West's new modus operandi." Billboard writer Eric Renner Brown criticized "Fire" for not going "anywhere interesting" despite calling it "solid, hinting at the longstanding rock aspirations Cudi explored on 2012's WZRD and 2015's Speedin' Bullet 2 Heaven," with him deriding how "the bland, brief verses" lead to the song sounding "more like a rough draft than a finished product."

Following the release of Kids See Ghosts, "Fire" opened at number 67 on the US Billboard Hot 100. Simultaneously, the track charted at number 32 on the US Hot R&B/Hip-Hop Songs chart. It performed best in Canada, entering the Canadian Hot 100 at number 49. In Australia, the song debuted at number 69 on the ARIA Singles Chart. The track reached number 58 and 83 on the Irish Singles Chart and Slovakia's Singles Digitál Top 100, respectively. "Fire" further charted at number 36 on the UK R&B Chart.

== Credits and personnel ==
Recording

- Recorded at West Lake Ranch, Jackson Hole, Wyoming

Personnel

- Kanye West – songwriter, production
- Kid Cudi – songwriter, production
- André 3000 – songwriter, production
- Evan Mast – songwriter, additional production
- BoogzDaBeast – production
- Zack Djurich – engineer
- Mike Malchicoff – engineer
- William J. Sullivan – engineer
- Jenna Felsenthal – assistant engineer
- Mike Dean – mixer
- Jess Jackson – mixer
- Sean Solymar – assistant mixer

Information taken from the Kids See Ghosts liner notes and Tidal.

== Charts ==
Chart performance for "Fire"
Chart (2018)	Peak position
Australia (ARIA)	69
Canada (Canadian Hot 100)	49
Ireland (IRMA)	58
Slovakia Singles Digital (ČNS IFPI)	83
UK Hip Hop/R&B (OCC)	36
UK Audio Streaming (OCC)	77
US Billboard Hot 100	67
US Hot R&B/Hip-Hop Songs (Billboard)	32
