= 4th Dimension (song) =

2018 song by Kids See Ghosts

Song by Kids See Ghosts featuring Louis Prima

from the album Kids See Ghosts
- Released: June 8, 2018
- Recorded: August 2017–2018
- Studio: West Lake Ranch, Jackson Hole, Wyoming
- Genre: Hip-hop
- Length: 2:33
- Label: GOOD; Def Jam
- Songwriters: Kanye West; Scott Mescudi; Mike Dean; Louis Prima
- Producer: Kanye West

Kids See Ghosts track listing
- 7 tracks: 1. "Feel the Love"; 2. "Fire"; 3. "4th Dimension"; 4. "Freeee (Ghost Town, Pt. 2)"; 5. "Reborn"; 6. "Kids See Ghosts"; 7. "Cudi Montage"

"4th Dimension" is a song by American hip-hop duo Kids See Ghosts, composed of the rappers Kanye West and Kid Cudi, from their first album Kids See Ghosts (2018). The song features Louis Prima who was credited as a co-writer due to his work being sampled prominently. The song was produced by West, with additional production from Mike Dean and Noah Goldstein. The song samples Prima's "What Will Santa Claus Say (When He Finds Everybody Swingin')" and Shirley Ann Lee's "Someday". Lyrically, the song features Kids See Ghosts presenting their thoughts to stop themselves from becoming worried.

The song received widespread acclaim from music critics who praised the sampling of "What Will Santa Claus Say (When He Finds Everybody Swingin')". Some commended the production, while a few critics cited "4th Dimension" as being among Kids See Ghosts' highlights. In 2018, the song debuted at number 42 on the US Billboard Hot 100, marking the first time a track with Prima appeared on the Hot 100 in 57 years, and thus breaking Bobby Helms' record of 54 years between chart appearances. The song reached the top 50 in Australia, Canada, Ireland, and the United Kingdom. It has since been certified gold in the United States by the Recording Industry Association of America (RIAA).

On June 26, 2020, "4th Dimension" was used as the soundtrack for a preview of Kids See Ghosts' Takashi Murakami–directed animated show of the same name. The clip features the characters Kanye Bear and Kid Fox, who are voiced by West and Kid Cudi, respectively. In the clip, the characters are sucked into a different dimension, where they successfully manage to escape a cemetery. Kids See Ghosts performed the song live at the 2018 Camp Flog Gnaw Carnival.

== Background and development ==
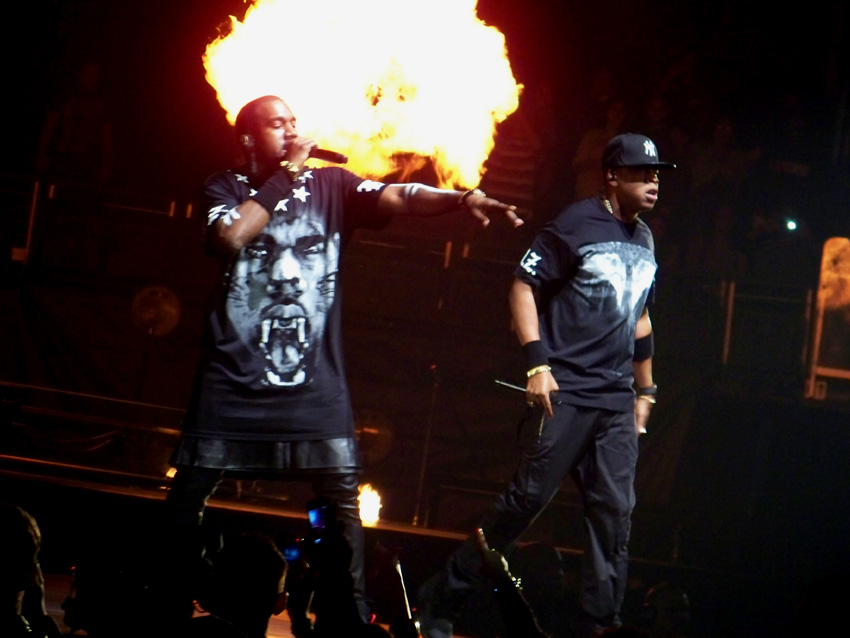
The song marked the third time West had credited a featured artist posthumously, following "The Joy" and "Otis" from his collaborative album Watch the Throne with Jay-Z in 2011.

On April 19, 2018, West announced a collaborative album with Kid Cudi. The album was revealed as being titled Kids See Ghosts by West, who proposed the release date of June 8, 2018 for it. Kid Cudi had been featured on numerous tracks by West before the announcement, including "Welcome to Heartbreak" (2008) and "Gorgeous" (2010). West released his eighth studio album Ye on June 1, 2018, with vocals from Kid Cudi included on the tracks "No Mistakes" and "Ghost Town". In a July 2018 cover story for Billboard, the latter of the two rappers recalled how Kids See Ghosts "knew" that "4th Dimension" was one of the songs they wanted to use while recording for their self-titled album in Wyoming.

Due to the holiday recording "What Will Santa Claus Say? (When He Finds Everybody Swingin')" (1936) by American singer Louis Prima being posthumously sampled on "4th Dimension", Prima was credited as a featured artist. As sole songwriter for the earlier song, Prima received songwriting credit on the modern work using his sample. "4th Dimension" was also written by West, Kid Cudi, and Mike Dean. The song sampling Prima's work does not mark the only track on the album to sample a posthumous artist, with "Cudi Montage" sampling a guitar riff from singer-songwriter Kurt Cobain. Prima's guest appearance on "4th Dimension" was the third time West provided credit for a featured artist posthumously, after he had previously credited posthumous features to singer-songwriters Curtis Mayfield and Otis Redding on the Jay-Z collaborations "The Joy" and "Otis" in 2010 and 2011, respectively. The staff of Complex reached out to the Gia Maione Prima Foundation's attorney Anthony Sylvester in June 2018 to find out how Prima became featured, which Sylvester explained by saying:

"It all happened very quickly, within the last week. Kanye and his people were gracious with sharing the recording with us, and acknowledging the contribution of Louis Prima to the song. They were very, very receptive to the idea that, for all intents and purposes, Louis was featured. I don't know if they had it in their minds before, or if it was simply something that we thought on our side. I didn't really expect [the idea of Louis being a featured artist] to go anywhere. And then the next day, there it was. It really speaks to the graciousness of Kanye and his people, I must say."

Sylvester elaborated as he recalled that West and his people told him "what their plans were" and "how excited they were," with him feeling "equally excited" after becoming aware of their plans and he admitted "a lot of good things" happened very quickly. He revealed that he was surprised they wanted to sample a holiday song, not remembering any sample requests for "What Will Santa Claus Say? (When He Finds Everybody Swingin')" ever before and Sylvester confirmed his "jaw dropped." According to Sylvester, it was him who approved the sample and he assumed "royalties are paid" to the foundation as a result of Prima receiving a writing credit as a writer while expressing the feeling that the sample request "won't be the last now." "4th Dimension" was produced by West, with additional production being handled by Dean alongside Noah Goldstein. Prior to sampling gospel singer Shirley Ann Lee's "Someday" on the song, West had sampled the recording for "Ghost Town", with the sample showing continuity of the track. The connection between the track and Kids See Ghosts is also evident from the album being titled as such, as well as it featuring the sequel "Freeee (Ghost Town, Pt. 2)". Originally, "Ghost Town" was slated for release as the fourth track on the album. (Note: The position of the fourth track on Kids See Ghosts was ultimately taken up by "Freeee (Ghost Town, Pt. 2)".)

== Composition and lyrics ==
Musically, "4th Dimension" is a hip-hop song. The beat was compared by Michael Cyrs from The 405 to Kid Cudi's debut studio album Man on the Moon: The End of Day (2009), while Spectrum Culture's Dylan Montanari viewed it as reminiscent of West's 2010 single "Power". The song contains a chopped up sample of "What Will Santa Claus Say (When He Finds Everybody Swingin')", written and performed by Prima. At the start of the song, a portion of the sample is used. After the beginning, the remainder is built around the sample, which is accompanied by "thumping" drums. Prima's vocals are looped, with his voice being accompanied by backing singers' vocals from the recording. For the song's chorus, the sample is used. In the middle of the song, cackling vocals appear. The beat switches when Kid Cudi's verse starts, being in time with his vocals. For the song's outro, a sample of the spoken word section from "Someday" by Lee is used. The section sampled includes Lee's producer mentioning that no song should have a length of more than three minutes, which Sidney Madden of NPR interpreted as a nod to the "all killer no filler" seven-song structure deployed by West for the five albums produced by him in the summer of 2018. (Note: Pusha T's Daytona, Kanye West's Ye, Kids See Ghosts, Nas' Nasir, and Teyana Taylor's K.T.S.E.)

In the lyrics of the song, Kids See Ghosts prevent their feelings from worrying them by presenting the random thoughts they have on the mind. The song represents bipolar disorder, as its quips heavily contrast other tracks on the album that see the duo destroying their internal monologues. Numerous references are made on the song, which include Kid Cudi name-dropping former wrestler Ric Flair and West rapping about Lacoste clothing. Fellow rappers Master P and Rick Ross are referenced by West, with him asserting that he is like a mix of the rappers. West's verse sees him detailing a sexual encounter and he mentions accidental anal sex, recalling being told that he was "in the wrong hole." In Kid Cudi's verse, he references his personal struggles in the years leading up to 2018 and asserts that "4th Dimension" is "the theme song."

== Release and promotion ==
"4th Dimension" was released as the third track on Kids See Ghosts' eponymous debut studio album on June 8, 2018; it had previously been revealed by West to be slated for release from this position. On the day of the album's release, a technical error cause multiple tracks to be mislabeled on streaming services, with the song being incorrectly labeled as the seventh and final track on Kids See Ghosts, "Cudi Montage". "4th Dimension" was played at the album's listening party in Santa Clarita, California on June 8, 2018, with a clip of the preview being shared the same day via Twitter. During their first performance dubbed as Kids See Ghosts, the duo performed the song at the 2018 Camp Flog Gnaw Carnival. The song was the fourth track of their set, but was the third track performed that they released under the moniker of Kids See Ghosts.

On June 26, 2020, Def Jam shared a preview of Kids See Ghosts' CGI animated show of the same name, with the clip using the song as its soundtrack. The show's sound design is handled by William J. Sullivan and Kid Cudi, while it is directed by Japanese contemporary artist Takashi Murakami, who also designed the album's cover art. He had previously worked with West for the rapper's third studio album Graduation (2007), providing the accompanying artwork and directing an animated music video for the track "Good Morning". Murakami recalled that Kid Cudi initially wanted to have the character of a dog for the show, though he was convinced to star as a fox character instead after West spoke against the dog character. Though no release date was announced at the time of the preview's release, Kid Cudi tweeted that the show is "coming soon."

For the clip, West and Kid Cudi voice the grunting of their characters Kanye Bear and Kid Fox, respectively, the former of which is based on West's "Dropout Bear" artwork mascot for his first three studio albums The College Dropout (2004), Late Registration (2005), and Graduation. The clip opens with the characters getting off a school bus, subsequently cycling around the neighbourhood on their bikes. While pedaling the bikes, they are chased by a scary-looking dark orb that appears in the sky. After the orb has followed them, Kanye Bear and Kid Fox are sucked into another dimension. The two rapidly move through a cemetery that they are attempting to escape, while a tree woman transforms into a flying machine of sorts. Kanye Bear wears flying Yeezy Sneakers, which he uses to save him and Kid Fox from peril in the dimension. At the end of the clip, the tree woman picks the two up and drops them off in front of a mysterious kingdom.

== Critical reception ==
The song met with widespread acclaim from music critics, who generally praised the sample of Prima's "What Will Santa Claus Say (When He Finds Everybody Swingin')". AllMusic editor Neil Z. Yeung cited the song as one of the highlights of Kids See Ghosts, calling it "as exciting and vital as anything West produced in his early-2000s golden years." He explained, describing the song as sampling "What Will Santa Claus Say (When He Finds Everybody Swingin')" alongside the album's "best flow," which he said "is a thrill" at the point "the hard beat clicks into step with Cudi's verse." The A.V. Club's Marty Sartini Garner branded "4th Dimension" a "twisted bop" and commented that the backing vocals of the "What Will Santa Claus Say (When He Finds Everybody Swingin')" sample "roll into the thump of Kanye and Mike Dean's beat," while viewing Prima's voice as "rich with delight" and comparing the sample to West's single "Jesus Walks" (2004). Writing in his Expert Witness column for Vice, Robert Christgau named the sample of the recording among the best moments on the album due to it being an example of when Kids See Ghosts "fool around like male bonders should." Arnold Chuck from Entertainment Weekly honored the "sonic exploration" from the sample of "What Will Santa Claus Say (When He Finds Everybody Swingin')" at the beginning of the song, which he said is followed by "some freaky horror hip-hop that is as dope as it is disturbing." PopMatters' Christopher Thiessen pointed out the song's sampling of "What Will Santa Claus Say (When He Finds Everybody Swingin')" for showing West's "ability to over and over drop the unexpected and the experimental."

Michelle Kim of Pitchfork highlighted the song's closing sample of Lee's "Someday" for functioning "similarly to the outro" on Ye track "Violent Crimes", noting that "Nicki Minaj leaves Kanye a voicemail with a few crucial bars for the song about protecting North West" and opining Kanye "presents a woman's voice as a guiding force within his music" with both outros. Kim also liked the song's sample of "What Will Santa Claus Say (When He Finds Everybody Swingin')", analyzing that Kanye West "somehow manages to turn that festive holiday tune about literal sleighs into a haunting loop of chanting voices." Christopher R. Weingarten from Rolling Stone lauded the song as "nothing short of fantastic," writing that after West had "already made Ray Charles, Otis Redding and Michael Jackson sound brand new" on his singles "Gold Digger" (2005), "Otis", and "Good Life" (2007), respectively, "he manages to do the same" with the sample of "What Will Santa Claus Say (When He Finds Everybody Swingin')". He continued, stating the sample is transformed "into an unsettling, funky Greek chorus to West and Cudi's old-fashioned rap boasts," as well as asserting that the "Someday" sample recontextualizes Lee's voice "to almost work like a Dogme 95-style vision for West's output in the Soundcloud era." For Consequence of Sound, Karas Lamb selected the song as one of the essential tracks on Kids See Ghosts. Cyrs wrote that West is "as youthful as ever" on the song and cited the cackling vocals as proof of the album being "a fun house of sound, lucidity, and exploration."

== Commercial performance ==
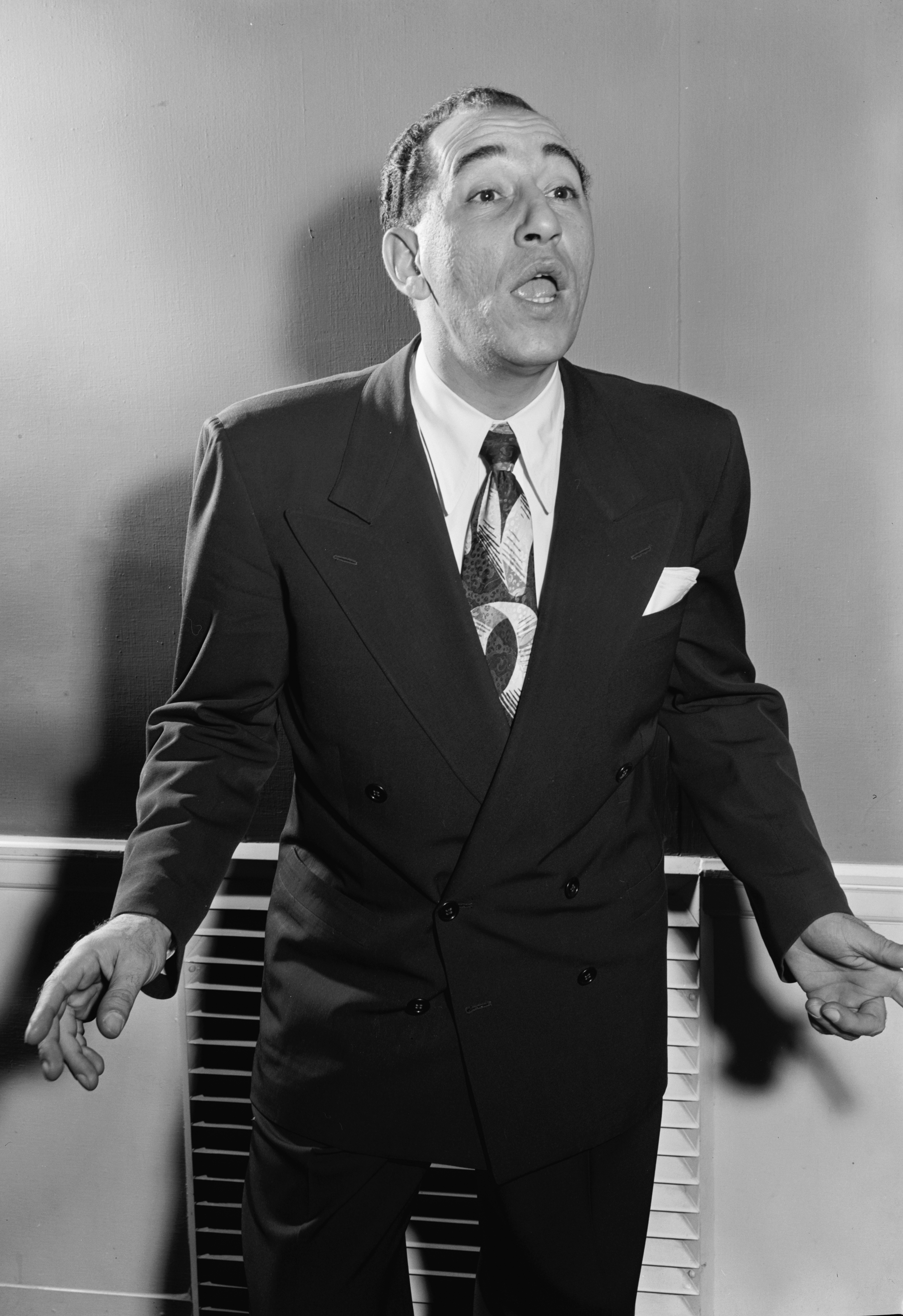
The song's debut at number 42 on the US Billboard Hot 100 marked Louis Prima's first release to chart in 57 years, breaking Bobby Helms' record of 54 years between chart appearances.

Upon the release of the album, "4th Dimension" reached number 42 on the US Billboard Hot 100. The debut marked the first song with Prima included to chart on the Hot 100 since his track "Wonderland by Night" appeared on the issue dated February 13, 1961. This set a record of 57 years, four months and two weeks for the longest break between Hot 100 appearances, surpassing the record previously held by Bobby Helms of 54 years, two months and three weeks as a result of his single "Jingle Bell Rock" (1957) re-charting. That same week, the song debuted at number 21 on the US Hot R&B/Hip-Hop Songs chart. On February 25, 2020, "4th Dimension" was certified gold by the Recording Industry Association of America (RIAA) for pushing 500,000 certified units in the United States.

Elsewhere, the song reached number 27 on the Canadian Hot 100. In Australia, it entered the ARIA Singles Chart at number 46. The song charted identically in the United Kingdom on the UK Singles Chart. "4th Dimension" experienced similar performance in Ireland, peaking at number 49 on the Irish Singles Chart.

== Credits and personnel ==
Recording

- Recorded at West Lake Ranch, Jackson Hole, Wyoming

Personnel

- Kanye West – songwriter, production
- Mike Dean – songwriter, additional production, mixer
- Louis Prima – songwriter, featured artist
- Kid Cudi – songwriter
- Noah Goldstein – additional production, engineer
- Plain Pat – additional programmer
- BoogzDaBeast – additional programmer
- Zack Djurich – engineer
- Mike Malchicoff – engineer
- William J. Sullivan – engineer
- Jenna Felsenthal – assistant engineer
- Jess Jackson – mixer
- Sean Solymar – assistant mixer

Information taken from the Kids See Ghosts liner notes and Tidal.

== Charts ==
Chart performance for "4th Dimension"
Chart (2018)	Peak position
Australia (ARIA)	46
Canada (Canadian Hot 100)	27
Ireland (IRMA)	49
New Zealand Heatseekers (RMNZ)	1
Portugal (AFP)	100
Slovakia Singles Digital (ČNS IFPI)	67
Swedish Heatseekers (Sverigetopplistan)	20
UK Singles (Official Charts)	46
UK Hip Hop/R&B (Official Charts)	25
US Billboard Hot 100	42
US Hot R&B/Hip-Hop Songs (Billboard)	32

== Certifications ==
Certifications and sales for "4th Dimension"
Region	Certification	Certified units/sales
United States (RIAA)	Gold	500,000^{‡}
^{‡} Sales+streaming figures based on certification alone.
