= Kids See Ghosts (disambiguation) =

Kids See Ghosts was an American hip hop supergroup composed of musicians Kanye West and Kid Cudi.

- Kids See Ghosts (album), their eponymous 2018 album
  - "Kids See Ghosts" (song), the album's title track
