= Feel the Love (Kids See Ghosts song) =

2018 song by Kids See Ghosts

Song by Kids See Ghosts featuring Pusha T

from the album Kids See Ghosts
- Released: June 8, 2018
- Recorded: 2017 – June 2018
- Studio: West Lake Ranch, Jackson Hole, Wyoming
- Genre: Industrial
- Length: 2:45
- Label: GOOD; Def Jam
- Songwriters: Kanye West; Scott Mescudi; Mike Dean; Evan Mast; Benjamin Levin; Terrence Thornton
- Producer: Kanye West

Kids See Ghosts track listing
- 7 tracks: 1. "Feel the Love"; 2. "Fire"; 3. "4th Dimension"; 4. "Freeee (Ghost Town, Pt. 2)"; 5. "Reborn"; 6. "Kids See Ghosts"; 7. "Cudi Montage"

"Feel the Love" is a song by the American hip hop duo Kids See Ghosts, composed by the rappers Kanye West and Kid Cudi, and released as the opening track on their first studio album Kids See Ghosts (2018). The song includes a feature from GOOD Music president Pusha T. It was produced by West and co-produced by Mike Dean and Benny Blanco, with additional production by Plain Pat, Evan Mast, Justin Vernon, Francis and the Lights, Cashmere Cat and Noah Goldstein. Recording of the song was finished less than 10 hours before the album's release, with Pusha T's vocals being recorded during this time period. An industrial song, it features drums and synthesizers. It includes West scat singing in a manner that was compared to his performance on "Lift Yourself", while Pusha T raps the only verse and Kid Cudi sings a chorus about love.

"Feel the Love" received generally positive reviews from music critics, who mostly praised the performance of West. A number of them highlighted his energy, while some critics complimented Kid Cudi's vocals. The song reached number 47 on the US Billboard Hot 100 and also charted in the top 50 in Canada and Ireland. The song was later certified gold in the United States by the Recording Industry Association of America (RIAA). Kids See Ghosts performed it at the Coachella Valley Music and Arts Festival in 2019. The song was used in a 2018 Xbox advertisement, which was part of the Jump in campaign. A mashup that includes the song and "Frequency 75" by DJ Snake was used for the trailer of F9 (2021).

== Background and recording ==
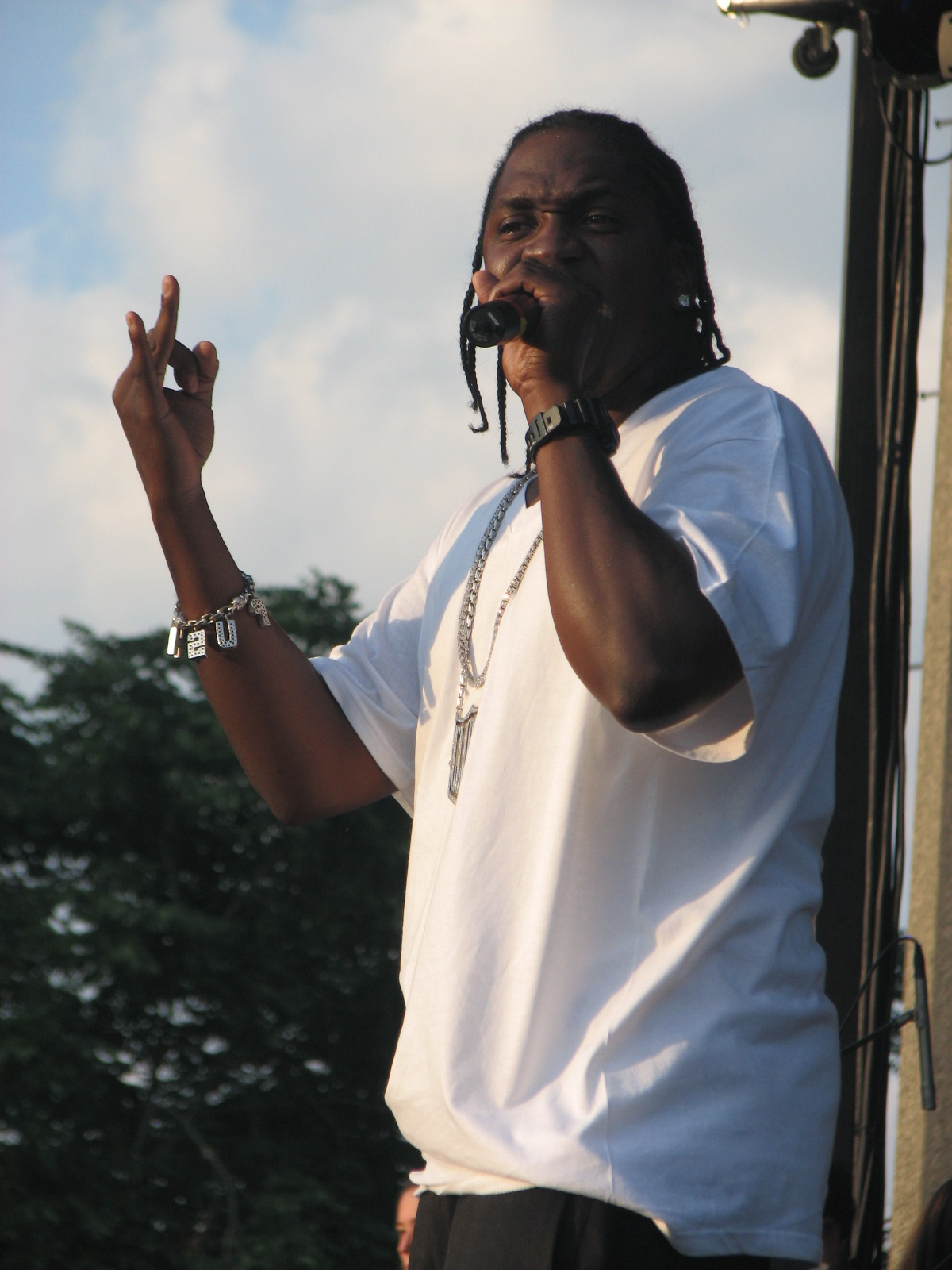
The song features a verse from Pusha T, which he recorded hours before the release of the album.

On April 19, 2018, Kanye West announced a collaborative album with Kid Cudi. The album was revealed as being titled Kids See Ghosts by West, with him proposing the release date of June 8, 2018. Kid Cudi had been featured on numerous tracks by West before the announcement, including "Welcome to Heartbreak" (2008) and "Gorgeous" (2010). West released his eighth studio album, Ye, on June 1, 2018, with vocals by Kid Cudi included on the tracks "No Mistakes" and "Ghost Town". In May 2018, Pusha T released his third studio album Daytona. The album features West on the track "What Would Meek Do?", which includes him alluding to lyrics from his April 2018 single "Lift Yourself". Pusha T attended the listening party for Ye in May 2018. Around seven or eight hours before the release of Kids See Ghosts on June 8, 2018, Pusha T was on a flight to Montreal. Pusha T was contacted by West during the flight, who said to him: "Yo, I need a verse. Can you go to the studio right now?" For his initial response, Pusha T told West that he "can't" and West replied by informing him, "I need you to go to the studio right now." A studio was booked and Pusha T ended up arriving to record his verse.

Coming before any verses from Kids See Ghosts, Pusha T's appearance stands as the album's first verse. A couple of weeks before the song was released, West had been putting forward an ideology on Twitter that "love is all you need." West titling the song "Feel the Love" continues the opinion of feeling love being present in his music, though Ye had been retitled from LOVE EVERYONE. The song was produced by West, with co-production from Mike Dean and Benny Blanco, and additional production was handled by Plain Pat, Evan Mast, Justin Vernon, Francis and the Lights, Cashmere Cat, and Noah Goldstein.

== Composition and lyrics ==
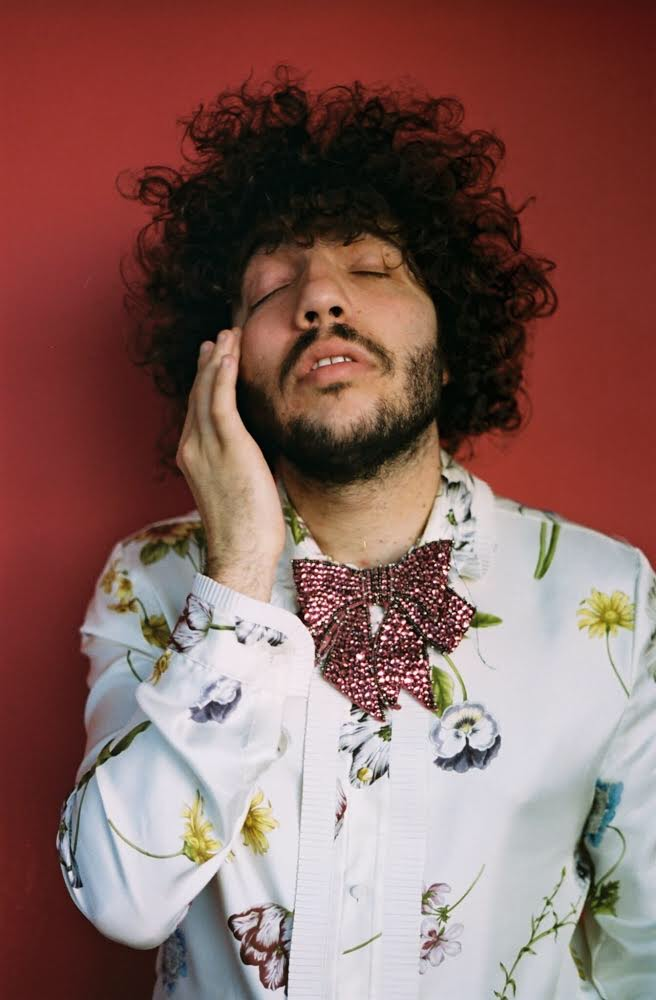
Co-producer Benny Blanco contributed the "ka-ka-ka-ka" drums to the song.

Musically, "Feel the Love" is an industrial track. The song features snare beat scatting that makes a "ka-ka-ka-ka" sound, with the drums having been contributed by Benny Blanco. Keys are contained within the song, which appear at the beginning of it and were labeled as "plinking." The song also includes synthesizers, and its production received comparisons to West's sixth studio album Yeezus (2013).

"Feel the Love" is the only track on the album that includes no references to religion. Pusha T has the only full verse on the track, which includes him boasting. The sentiment expressed by Pusha T on the Daytona track "Infrared" is repeated with the line "I am not to be compared to you rappers, Eazy-Duz-It", which references the late rapper Eazy-E's 1988 debut studio album. Pusha T's verse also features him assuring that "the details is [sic] ironed out." West contributes gun noises to the song, which last for nearly two minutes. The noises made by him follow the long tradition of using sound instead of words in popular music, which the likes of Lady Gaga, Led Zeppelin, Ray Charles and Louis Armstrong have taken part in. West's performance features scatting from him and was described as reminiscent of his nonsensical performance on "Lift Yourself", while some writers compared West's vocals to the music of fictional rapper Big Shaq. For the pre-chorus of the song, West shouts the line "Where the chorus?" Kid Cudi sings that he can "still feel the love" on the chorus, with him finding joy as well as purpose.

== Release and promotion ==
On June 8, 2018, "Feel the Love" was released as the first track on Kids See Ghosts' eponymous debut studio album. West had previously shared a track list on May 15 of that year, which showed the song slated to be released as the opener. On the day of the album's release, multiple tracks were mislabeled on streaming services due to a technical error, including "Feel the Love" being mislabeled as the third track on Kids See Ghosts, "4th Dimension". American comedian Pete Davidson posted a blurry photograph of him and his then-girlfriend Ariana Grande eating cotton candy together at the album's listening party in Santa Clarita, California on June 8, 2018, captioning the photo "feel the love" in reference to the song.

For their first performance billed as Kids See Ghosts, the duo performed the song at the 2018 Camp Flog Gnaw Carnival. While it was the second track of their set, the song was the first track to be performed that was released by them under the Kids See Ghosts moniker. During Kid Cudi's weekend two set at the 2019 Coachella Festival, West joined him at the Sahara Tent in a surprise appearance. The duo came out of a cavernous set that resembles Mars, before delivering a performance of the track.

== Critical reception ==
"Feel the Love" was met with generally positive reviews from music critics, many of whom praised West's vocals. Writing for The Guardian, Dean Van Nguyen noted the track for "unleashing sinister keys," while pointing out the "typically barbed verse from Pusha and a manic impression of a gun from Kanye that rivals Big Shaq's ridiculous rasps." In his Expert Witness Vice column, Robert Christgau praised how Kids See Ghosts "fool around like male bonders should" with the track's "vocal rat-a-tats." Jamie Lawlor from Drowned in Sound said that Pusha T delivers "a reptilian guest verse," and highlighted that "West and Cudi engage in a two-player run-and-gun, Cudi on lead vocals as West screams onomatopoeias in tandem with ballistic drum breaks," with him describing West's "choice of wordless yowling" as "fitting of his current thesis of free thought and creation." At The 405, Michael Cyrs commented that West "enters with a vocal solo, treating the microphone like a snare drum in a furious future scat." Cyrs elaborated, admitting that West's scatting "makes the following choruses from Cudi sound angelic in the wake of Ye's manic vocalizations" and he compared the song to the artifact Pandora's box.

Entertainment Weekly's Chuck Arnold wrote that the song includes Kid Cudi singing "in a cathartic wail" and viewed him as "finding both joy and purpose in that survivor cry," while also opining that it features "frenzied vocal gibberish reminiscent of German musician George Kranz's '80s dance hit 'Din Daa Daa'," which he thought was very similar to the performance of an exorcism. Christopher R. Weingarten was less enthusiastic in Rolling Stone, commenting that "the phrase 'feel the love'" is sung by Kid Cudi "in the distended yowl of Young Thug or D.R.A.M. 17 times," and he noted West adding "catchy gibberish" with the "Waka Flocka Flame-style gunshots." Weingarten continued, labeling "the rhythmic sophistication behind [West's] Ba-ba-ba-ba-ba-ba-bas in 'Feel the Love'" as "pretty brave and fairly smart," though concluded by comparing the result to music artists making new wave records in the 1980s and wrote that it is "cool, catchy, contemporary, but not exactly why we're here." In a more negative review for XXL, Julian Kimble complained that the song "could've done without Kanye's aggressive scatting."

== Commercial performance ==
Following the release of Kids See Ghosts, the track charted at number 47 on the US Billboard Hot 100. That same week, it entered the US Hot R&B/Hip-Hop Songs chart at number 24. On May 5, 2020, "Feel the Love" was certified gold by the Recording Industry Association of America (RIAA) for sales of 500,000 certified units in the United States. The song performed best in Canada, peaking at number 35 on the Canadian Hot 100.

In Australia, the song charted at number 57 on the ARIA Singles Chart. On the UK Singles Chart, it reached number 47. Similarly, the song peaked at number 50 on the Irish Singles Chart. The song was less successful in Slovakia, entering the country's Singles Digitál Top 100 chart at number 58.

== Usage in media ==
In October 2018, "Feel the Love" was used in an Xbox advertisement that was released for the brand's Jump in campaign. Alongside the song, the advert features film footage of a woman performing a parachute jump out of a helicopter that is mixed with clips of characters diving from the sky in video games. A mashup of the song with French record producer DJ Snake's Carte Blanche track "Frequency 75" was used as the soundtrack of the trailer for upcoming American action film F9 (2021). On January 31, 2020, the trailer was shared, showing John Cena portray the roles of a new villain and the brother of Dominic Toretto, while it also sees the return of Fast & Furious franchise director Justin Lin and demonstrates that Sung Kang's Han character is still alive.

== Credits and personnel ==
Recording

- Recorded at West Lake Ranch, Jackson Hole, Wyoming

Personnel

- Kanye West – songwriter, production
- Benny Blanco – songwriter, co-production
- Mike Dean – songwriter, co-production, mixer
- Evan Mast – songwriter, additional production
- Pusha T – songwriter, featured artist
- Kid Cudi – songwriter
- Noah Goldstein – additional production, engineer
- Plain Pat – additional production
- Justin Vernon – additional production
- Francis and the Lights – additional production
- Cashmere Cat – additional production
- Andrew Dawson – engineer, mixer
- Zack Djurich – engineer
- Tom Kahre – engineer
- Mike Malchicoff – engineer
- William J. Sullivan – engineer
- Jenna Felsenthal – assistant engineer
- Jess Jackson – mixer
- Sean Solymar – assistant mixer

Information taken from the Kids See Ghosts liner notes and Tidal.

== Charts ==
Chart performance for "Feel the Love"
Chart (2018)	Peak position
Australia (ARIA)	57
Canada (Canadian Hot 100)	35
France (SNEP)	185
Greece International Digital Singles (IFPI)	100
Ireland (IRMA)	50
Portugal (AFP)	82
Slovakia Singles Digital (ČNS IFPI)	58
Swedish Heatseekers (Sverigetopplistan)	19
UK Singles (Official Charts)	47
UK Hip Hop/R&B (Official Charts)	26
US Billboard Hot 100	48
US Hot R&B/Hip-Hop Songs (Billboard)	24

== Certifications ==
Certifications and sales for "Feel the Love"
Region	Certification	Certified units/sales
United States (RIAA)	Gold	500,000^{‡}
^{‡} Sales+streaming figures based on certification alone.

== See also ==
- Lift Yourself
