= Kids See Ghosts (song) =

2018 song by Kids See Ghosts featuring Yasiin Bey

Song by Kids See Ghosts featuring Yasiin Bey

from the album Kids See Ghosts
- Released: June 8, 2018
- Studio: West Lake Ranch, Jackson Hole, Wyoming
- Genre: experimental hip hop
- Length: 4:05
- Label: GOOD; Def Jam
- Songwriters: Kanye West; Scott Mescudi; Yasiin Bey; Andrew Dawson; Justin Vernon
- Producers: Kanye West; Kid Cudi; Plain Pat

Kids See Ghosts track listing
- 7 tracks: 1. "Feel the Love"; 2. "Fire"; 3. "4th Dimension"; 4. "Freeee (Ghost Town, Pt. 2)"; 5. "Reborn"; 6. "Kids See Ghosts"; 7. "Cudi Montage"

"Kids See Ghosts" is a song by American hip hop duo Kids See Ghosts, composed of Kanye West and Kid Cudi, from their first album Kids See Ghosts (2018). The song features a guest appearance from Mos Def, who received credit under his real name of Yasiin Bey. It was produced by West, Kid Cudi, and Plain Pat, while additional production was handled by Andrew Dawson, Justin Vernon and Noah Goldstein. Apart from Plain Pat and Goldstein, the producers wrote the song alongside Bey. Making heavy use of synthesizers, the song draws inspiration from ambient music. Lyrically, the song reflects on the difficulties of fame and success.

The song received widespread acclaim from music critics, who generally complimented Bey's vocals. They often highlighted the presence of his feature on the album, while some critics praised the lyrical content of "Kids See Ghosts" and a few appreciated the duo's chemistry. It reached number 73 on the US Billboard Hot 100, while further appearing at number 53 on the Canadian Hot 100. The song was performed live by Kids See Ghosts at the 2018 Camp Flog Gnaw Carnival. In June 2018, Tyler, the Creator shared his remix of the song, titled "Crust in Their Eyes". It was recorded that same month and features him rapping personal lyrics over the original. The remix received positive reviews from critics, mostly being praised for Tyler, the Creator's rapping; a number of them placed emphasis on his lyricism.

== Background ==
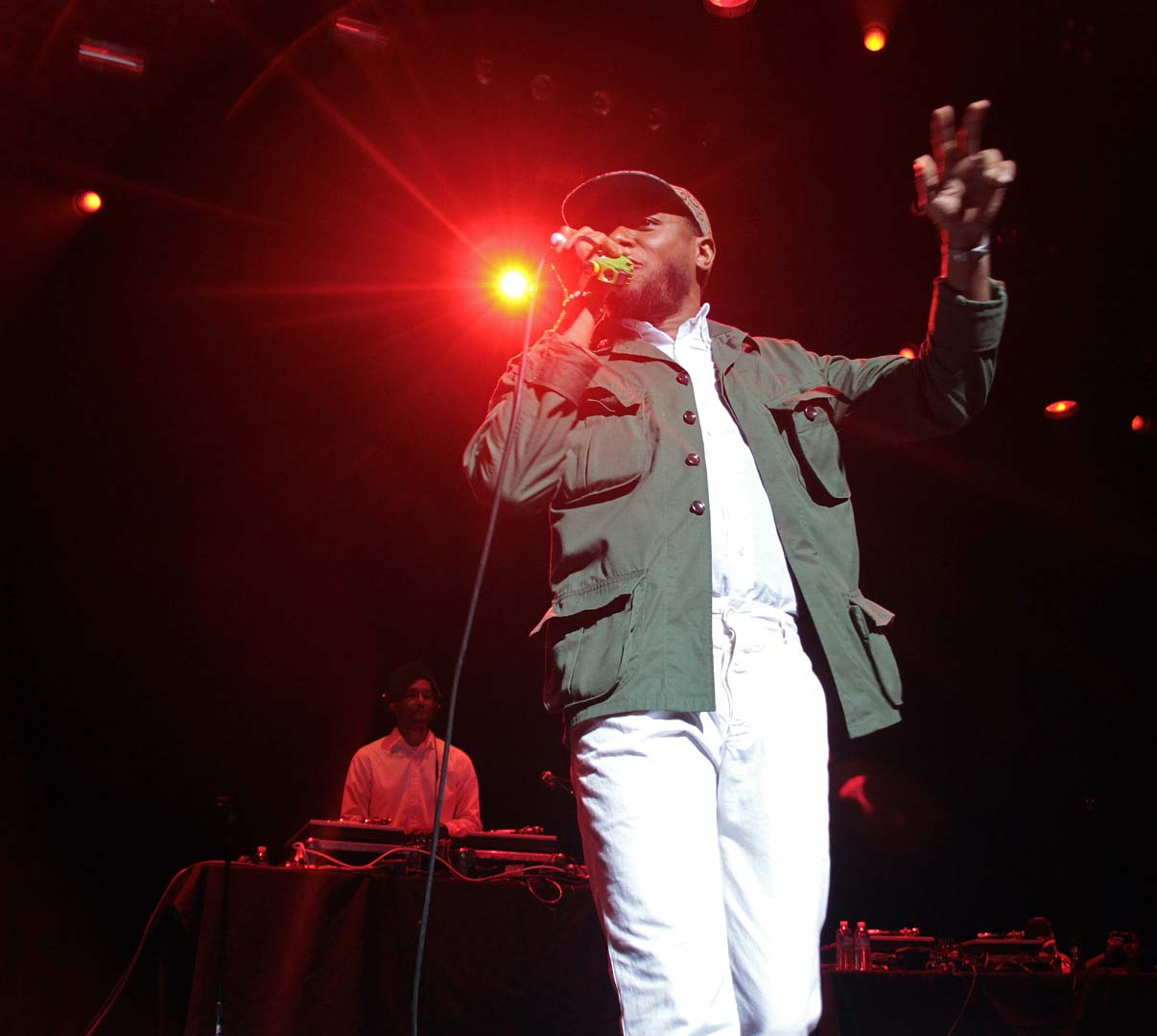
The song features vocals from Yasiin Bey.

On April 19, 2018, Kanye West announced a collaborative album with Kid Cudi. The album was revealed as being titled Kids See Ghosts by West, with him proposing the release date of June 8, 2018, for it, and he later announced that the album was set to include a song of the same name. Kid Cudi had been featured on a number of tracks by West prior to the announcement of Kids See Ghosts, such as "Welcome to Heartbreak" (2008) and "Gorgeous" (2010). West released his eighth studio album Ye on June 1, 2018, with vocals from Kid Cudi included on the tracks "No Mistakes" and "Ghost Town".

"Kids See Ghosts" includes a feature from rapper Mos Def, who was credited as Yasiin Bey, which is his real name. He had collaborated with West since the start of the latter's career, with him contributing a feature to "Two Words" from West's debut studio album The College Dropout (2004). In January 2018, fellow rapper Talib Kweli teased that West and Bey were working together with an Instagram photo. The picture shows West and Bey sat at a table alongside stand-up comedian Dave Chappelle, with the three of them writing notes. However, it was not known at the time if West and Bey were working on material together. The song was produced by West, Kid Cudi, and Plain Pat, with additional production from Andrew Dawson, Justin Vernon and Noah Goldstein. The producers, excluding Plain Pat and Goldstein, co-wrote it with Bey.

== Composition and lyrics ==
Musically, "Kids See Ghosts" is an ambient influenced song. According to The Guardian's Dean Van Nguyen, it has a rumbling beat. The song heavily features synths alongside hand drums that softly pitter-patter, accompanying the verses from Kids See Ghosts. It contains chilling sounds as well as clicking percussion and a bassline, with the latter of the three appearing during the bridge. The song includes a jungle groove. Bey performs both the bridge and the hook of the song, and his vocals are covered in electronics. Kid Cudi contributes a verse, which is accompanied by humming from him. During West's verse, he raps enthusiastically.

In the lyrics of "Kids See Ghosts", the duo of the same name rap reflectively about the difficulties of fame and success. The lyrics feature respective references to religion from West and Kid Cudi. For the hook, Bey declares, "Kids see ghosts sometimes/Spirit, moving around, just moving around." In Kid Cudi's verse, he alludes to his private mental health battle while commenting on struggling to find happiness. West's performance sees him actively attempting to live up to his own legacy, as well as rapping about the public fight for his soul. On the bridge of the song, Bey recites a brief mission statement.

== Release and promotion ==
On June 8, 2018, "Kids See Ghosts" was released as the sixth and penultimate track on Kids See Ghosts' eponymous debut studio album. The song switched position from the track list tweeted by West on May 15, 2018, that showed it as originally being slated for release as the second track. However, on the day of its release, multiple tracks from the album were mislabeled on streaming services due to a technical error, with "Kids See Ghosts" being incorrectly labeled as the album's second track, "Fire". For the first show that they were billed as Kids See Ghosts, the duo delivered a performance of the song at the 2018 Camp Flog Gnaw Carnival. "Kids See Ghosts" was the seventh track of their set, while it was the penultimate track to be performed that was released by them under the moniker of Kids See Ghosts.

== Critical reception ==
"Kids See Ghosts" was met with widespread acclaim from music critics, with Bey's performance mostly garnering praise. Narsimha Chintaluri from HipHopDX asserted that Bey "grabs a hypnotic hook" on the song. The staff of XXL wrote that with the title track's lyrical style alongside "the context of Kids See Ghosts", the former's "driving force" is "youthful energy" and liked how Bey "takes command of the song's creeping bassline". They continued, voicing the belief that the song completes the album's "strongest sequence" while Bey contributes to forming "a strong supporting cast that aids the Kids See Ghosts narrative", along with the other featured artists. On a similar note, Exclaim! writer Riley Wallace cited Bey's appearance as one of the features that help make the album "feel like more of a larger collective" as West and Kid Cudi "feel like lead singers". Ben Devlin from musicOMH listed the feature as evidence Kids See Ghosts' guest appearances "are well-picked and serve their respective tracks in contrasting ways"; he called Bey's presence "very unassuming" on the title track and described his lyrics as "enigmatic".

Nguyen considered Bey's voice to be "swathe[d]" in "gentle electronics" and noticed that the "spiritual hums" from Kid Cudi "match the rumbling beat" of the song, with him being complimentary of how West is able to "artfully fold the orchestration into the voices of his collaborators" and demonstrate his "almighty" musical ear has come back. He further made consideration that the song can be "viewed primarily as an exercise in highlighting all of Cudi's strengths" as "the more outlandish proclivities" are erased, remarking West "is frequently pulled into Cudi's lane" rather than the other way round. While Robert Christgau pointed to Bey's "envisioning" as the album's "closest brush with wisdom" in his Expert Witness column at Vice, he also named the song's "nursery rhyme in waiting" one of the best parts of Kids See Ghosts due to it being an example of how the duo of the same name "fool around like male bonders should". Reviewing for Entertainment Weekly, Chuck Arnold commented that the song "spins a jungle groove" by presenting a confrontation of "the monsters that lurk in our heads". In Rolling Stone, Christopher R. Weingarten praised Kid Cudi's lyricism. For Highsnobiety, Russel Dean Stone wrote that the atmosphere of the album is "fully embodied" on the song.

=== Accolades ===
On June 8, 2018, Pitchfork named "Kids See Ghosts" the best new track. The magazine's writer Sheldon Pearce complimented Kids See Ghosts' chemistry, noting that they do "bridge the gap between Cudi's stoner hymnals and the cursed, self-flagellating ego trips of Kanye's ye" while acclaiming the duo's rapping and the "gentle rush" of the song's music. The track was listed by Eric Renner Brown from Billboard as the 19th best song from the five albums produced by West in 2018, with him questioning that it "could be West's most lyrically limber moment" out of the recording sessions for the albums. (Note: Pusha T's Daytona, West's Ye, Kids See Ghosts, Nas' Nasir, and Teyana Taylor's K.T.S.E.) On the Pitchfork Readers' Poll for the top 50 songs of 2018, the track was voted in at number 14.

== Commercial performance ==
Upon the release of Kids See Ghosts, the title track opened at number 73 on the US Billboard Hot 100. The track simultaneously entered the US Hot R&B/Hip-Hop Songs chart at number 37. It was most successful in Canada, peaking at number 53 on the Canadian Hot 100. In Australia, the track reached number 84 on the ARIA Singles Chart. Elsewhere, "Kids See Ghosts" debuted at number 64 on the Irish Singles Chart. The track further charted at number 39 on the UK R&B Chart.

== Tyler, the Creator remix ==
=== Background and composition ===
American rapper Tyler, the Creator released a remix of "Kids See Ghosts" entitled "Crust in Their Eyes" to his SoundCloud on June 15, 2018. The title comes from a line in the remix. Tyler, the Creator had remixed West's music in the past, sharing a freestyle over "Freestyle 4" under the title of "What the Fuck Right Now" in the same year as the original's release on West's seventh studio album The Life of Pablo (2016). The previous year, Tyler, the Creator featured West on the track "Smuckers" from his third studio album Cherry Bomb. He tweeted of "Kids See Ghosts" that "i like this song a lot and wrote to it the same hour i heard it", also revealing a friend sent the instrumental to him and he "recorded it that night". Tyler, the Creator posted another tweet, in which he recalled West "sent me that beat same night" and expressed strongly positive feelings of West's verse while also praising Bey's performance on the original. The remix's cover art was created by French contemporary photographer Matthieu Venot.

On "Crust in Their Eyes", Tyler, the Creator raps over the original, while Bey's hook is kept. After the hook, the rapper's performance begins. The remix features personal lyrics from Tyler, the Creator, and includes references to Twitter cancellations. He begins by mentioning calling his sister and admitting to not telling her that he loves her enough. At one point, Tyler, the Creator calls out people who feel assured they are "woke but got crust in their eyes."

=== Critical reception ===
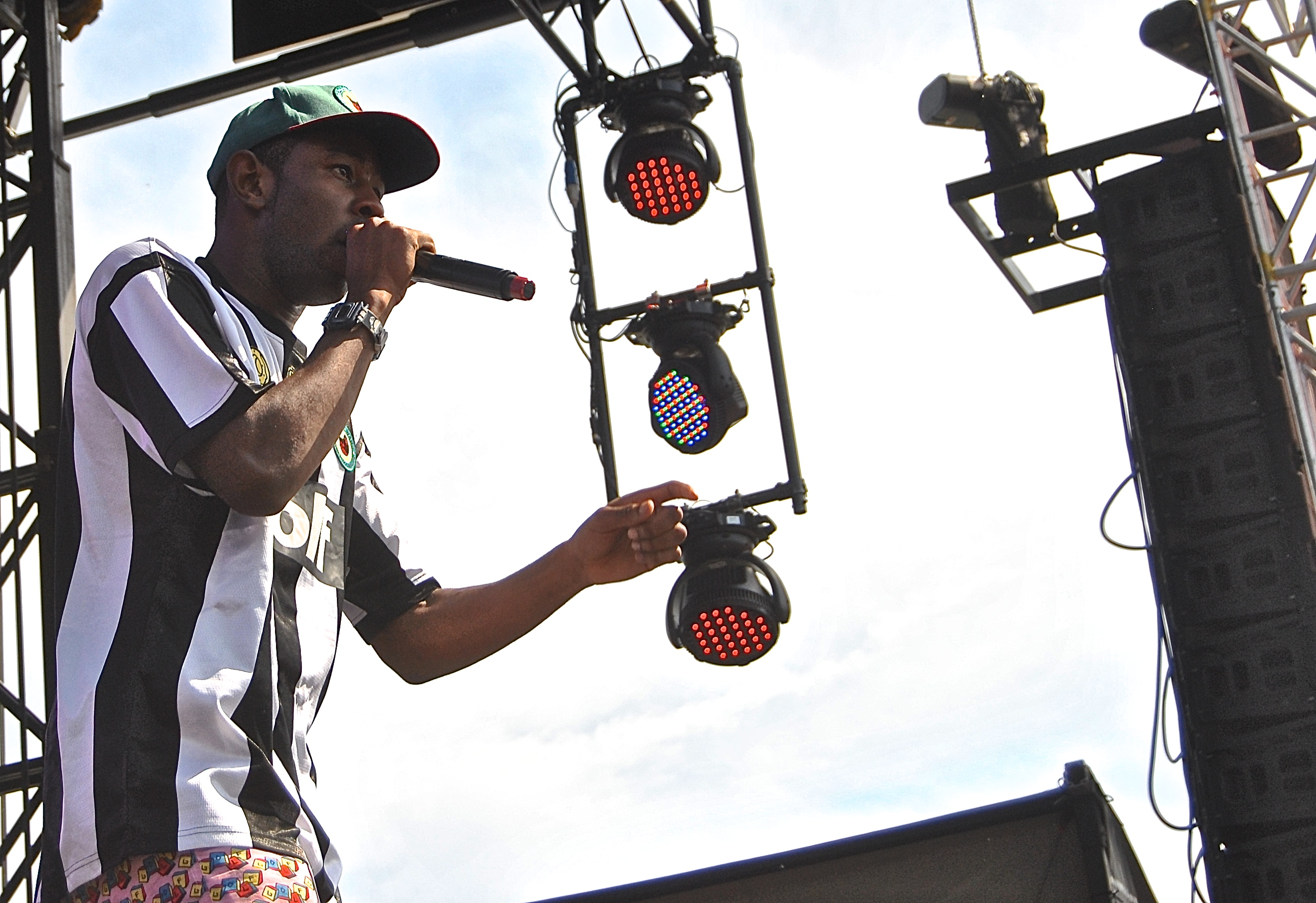
Several critics were complementary towards Tyler, the Creator's performance on the remix.

"Crust in Their Eyes" was received with positive reviews from music critics. In a review for Consequence of Sound, Ben Kaye expressed positive feelings of the lyrical content. Grace Fleisher from Dancing Astronaut asserted that Tyler, the Creator puts himself forward "as characteristically clever and collected" on the remix, and concluded by saying he does "his peers' work considerable justice". HotNewHipHop writer Mitch Findlay stated that the rapper delivers "mixtape-ready bars" on the remix, citing his lyrics as "conjuring images of The Simpsons legend Squeaky Voiced Teen". Despite being disappointed in the remix ending "before it truly blossoms", Findlay enjoyed how it highlights the "rapper" side of Tyler, the Creator's artistry. For This Song Is Sick, Jake Nixon wrote that the "fire" remix "does not disappoint" and features an "amazing verse" from Tyler, the Creator, who "sounds incredible over the production" in his opinion. Phil Witmer of Vice regarded the remix as "particularly affectionate" due to Tyler, the Creator's past connections to West.

== Credits and personnel ==
Recording

- Recorded at West Lake Ranch, Jackson Hole, Wyoming

Personnel

- Kanye West – songwriter, production
- Kid Cudi – songwriter, production
- Andrew Dawson – songwriter, additional production, engineer
- Justin Vernon – songwriter, additional production
- Yasiin Bey – songwriter, featured artist
- Plain Pat – production
- Noah Goldstein – additional production, engineer
- Zack Djurich – engineer
- Mike Malchicoff – engineer
- William J. Sullivan – engineer
- Jenna Felsenthal – assistant engineer
- Mike Dean – mixer
- Jess Jackson – mixer
- Sean Solymar – assistant mixer

Information taken from the Kids See Ghosts liner notes and Tidal.

== Charts ==
Chart performance for "Kids See Ghosts"
Chart (2018)	Peak position
Australia (ARIA)	84
Canada (Canadian Hot 100)	53
Ireland (IRMA)	64
UK Hip Hop/R&B (Official Charts)	39
UK Audio Streaming (Official Charts)	79
US Billboard Hot 100	73
US Hot R&B/Hip-Hop Songs (Billboard)	37

== Certifications ==
Certifications and sales for "Kids See Ghosts"
Region	Certification	Certified units/sales
United States (RIAA)	Gold	500,000^{‡}
^{‡} Sales+streaming figures based on certification alone.
