= Jayson Greene =

American writer and editor

Jayson Greene (born 1981 or 1982) is an American author, music critic and editor. He has served as a senior editor of online music magazine Pitchfork and is the author of Once More We Saw Stars and UnWorld.

Once More We Saw Stars is a memoir about the death of his two-year-old daughter in 2015. The book, released May 14, 2019, received a starred review from Publishers Weekly and was named to lists of most-anticipated books of 2019 by Entertainment Weekly, the Observer, New York magazine's Vulture, Elle, Oprah Magazine and Bustle.

Reviewing Once More We Saw Stars for The New York Times, Alex Witchel praised the book as "a revelation of lightness and agility. That [Greene] managed to keep his facility for language during a period where it often disappears is a miracle. He has created a narrative of grief and acceptance that is compulsively readable and never self-indulgent." Rolling Stone gave it four of five stars, noting that the story which "might be too bleak to face" instead is "an intensely moving, life-affirming story about a young couple moving through the darkest depths of grief together, making it up as they go along."
