= Gorgeous (Kanye West song) =

2010 song by Kanye West

Song by Kanye West featuring Kid Cudi and Raekwon

from the album My Beautiful Dark Twisted Fantasy
- Released: November 22, 2010
- Recorded: 2010
- Genre: Rap rock
- Length: 5:57
- Label: Roc-A-Fella; Def Jam
- Songwriters: Kanye West; Ernest Wilson; Mike Dean; Malik Jones; Che Smith; Corey Woods; Scott Mescudi; Gene Clark; Roger McGuinn
- Producers: Kanye West; No I.D.; Mike Dean

"Gorgeous" is a song by American hip hop recording artist Kanye West from his fifth studio album, My Beautiful Dark Twisted Fantasy (2010). The track features a hook provided by Kid Cudi, a recording artist formerly signed to West's label GOOD Music, and a rap verse provided by the Wu-Tang Clan member Raekwon. The song was written by West, Cudi, Raekwon, No I.D., Mike Dean and Rhymefest, and was produced by West, No I.D. and Dean. It contains elements of Enoch Light and the Glittering Guitars' cover version of The Turtles' song "You Showed Me".

"Gorgeous" received mostly positive reviews from music critics, who generally praised the intricacy of the production, the quality of the guest features and the rock music-inspired aesthetic of the song. Several critics cited West's verses as a highlight of the track, complimenting his lyricism and delivery. Before its release, West premiered an a cappella version of the song in the form of a freestyle rap on Funkmaster Flex's Hot 97 radio show. Despite not being released as a single, the song appeared on the Billboard Bubbling Under Hot 100 Singles chart. Cudi and West performed the song live at SXSW, and West performed the track at the Lollapalooza musical festival. "Gorgeous" was also utilized in West's short film Runaway.

== Background ==
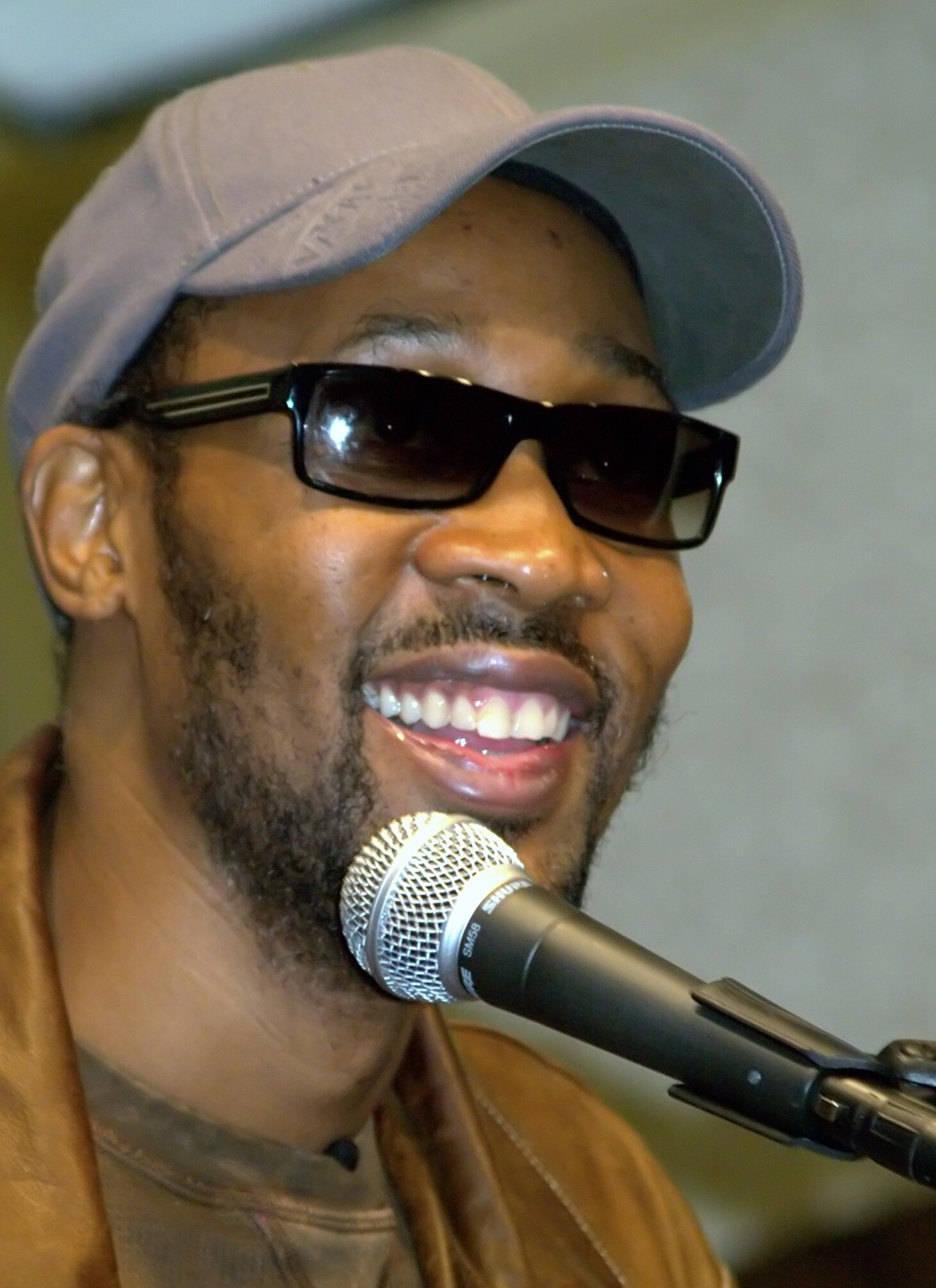
According to RZA, West embodied the mentality of the Wu-Tang Clan and advised Raekwon to collaborate with him.

The majority of My Beautiful Dark Twisted Fantasy was recorded in Oahu, Hawaii, including "Gorgeous". Following several media controversies, West decided to record his next album in a reclusive manner only working with artists he considered himself familiar with. The song features rapper and occasional singer Kid Cudi, a performer West once described as his favorite artist. The two had previously collaborated on West's fourth album 808s & Heartbreak, an album that served as a big influence on Cudi. As a friend of West, Cudi was invited to Hawaii to listen to recording sessions of the album. One day when Cudi was hanging around the studio, he overheard the composition of "Gorgeous", which he was overwhelmed by. He asked immediately to be featured on the track. While a majority of the artists who worked on the album passed their time playing games of basketball, Cudi smoked marijuana and worked-out on a treadmill in preparation of the recording of his lines. On the recording of the song, Cudi mused;

“Gorgeous was one of those records that, as soon as I heard the beat, I was like, ‘Man, this is the one. This is that 'This Can’t Be Life' Kanye beat. This is that classic ‘[Kan]Ye beat. I want to be on this.’ I came up to him, and I was like, ‘Man, are you working on this record? Are you working on this beat?’ He goes, ‘Yeah … do you got an idea for it?’ I was like, ‘Yeah, I might.’ I didn’t. I was lying like a motherfucker. I was like, ‘Yeah, man, I want to get on this joint.’”

Cudi commented that the way the song was recorded was similar to the way prior collaborations between the two were recorded; West will bounce ideas off of other writers and gauge their reaction before going forward with any of his own ideas. In an interview with MTV Cudi commented, "that's always our collab formula, and that's just how 'Gorgeous' came about. He just kind of told me what he was trying to say, I threw out some words, we rearranged words, and we came out with a bunch of different options before we come up with the hook."

It was announced that Raekwon of the Wu-Tang Clan would also be featured on the song, who West had invited to Hawaii. Raekwon initially had no interest in working with West musically, and originally only went to Hawaii to share some insight with him. According to the rapper, a lot of artists in the music industry refuse to be honest and give genuine advice because they don't want to help their competition, comparing the mentality to a group of crabs in a barrel. One of the reasons for Raekwon's desire to give West advice was because the frontman of the Wu-Tang Clan, RZA, spoke positively of West. RZA stated that West embodied the mentality of the Wu-Tang Clan, and praised his skills as a producer. RZA was a part of the recording sessions for the album in Hawaii, and contributed to the production of songs "Dark Fantasy" and "So Appalled". Eventually after being impressed by West himself, Raekwon decided to collaborate with West on several tracks, including "Gorgeous". Raekwon described West as a hard worker, and stated that the "first thing I can tell you about Kanye West is that he's a hard worker. When you look at him, you can tell that he still has that whole hip-hop thing in his bones."

== Composition ==
"Gorgeous"
A 30 second sample of "Gorgeous" which features Kanye West rapping about various social issues, with a notable guitar riff in the background.

"Gorgeous" is a bluesy, rock-driven song that features West's thoughts on social injustice. Other topics such as sexual exploitation and social disillusionment are expressed throughout the track. The song opens with a melodic electric guitar chord, erupting into the hook provided by Kid Cudi. The guitar riff is derived from an instrumental cover of The Turtles's 1968 song "You Showed Me" performed by the group Enoch Light and The Glittering Guitars, and the hook is an interpolation of the original Turtles song's chorus melody. The production style found within the song is noticeably more subdued than average West compositions, quietly playing alongside the lush guitar playing. West muses about social issues and comments on his past critics, rapping at a modest pace over the guitar-driven production. Jon Caramanica of The New York Times commented on West's lyrical presentation on the track and compared him to rapper Jay-Z, writing "on 'Gorgeous' he sneers at the competition, 'you blowing up? / that’s good / fantastic', maybe the iciest blow-off since 'Jay-Z’s You got a little dough? That’s cool with me.'" Sputnikmusic's Channing Freeman felt that the song was "broodingly slow" and that it was "driven by piano chords and a questing electric guitar." Dan Vidal of URB commented on the intricacy of the lyrics:

"On 'Gorgeous,' he treats his distorted vocals as if they were another instrument to be blended seamlessly into the mix alongside the muted electric guitar-riff. He spits: Penitentiary chances, the devil dances / and eventually answers to the call of autumn / all them fallin’, for the love of ballin’ / get caught with 30 rocks, the cop look like Alec Baldwin. This track is an excellent microcosm of the album because it exemplifies the pinnacle of Ye’s visionary talent.”

. MTV highlighted the lyrics; "but this pimp is at the top of Mount Olympus / Ready for the world's games / This is my Olympics / We make 'em say 'ho' cause the game is so pimpish / Choke a 'South Park' writer with a fish stick." The last line is a reference to the South Park episode "Fishsticks" which parodied West. While he enjoyed the episode, it reportedly hurt his feelings.

== Reception ==
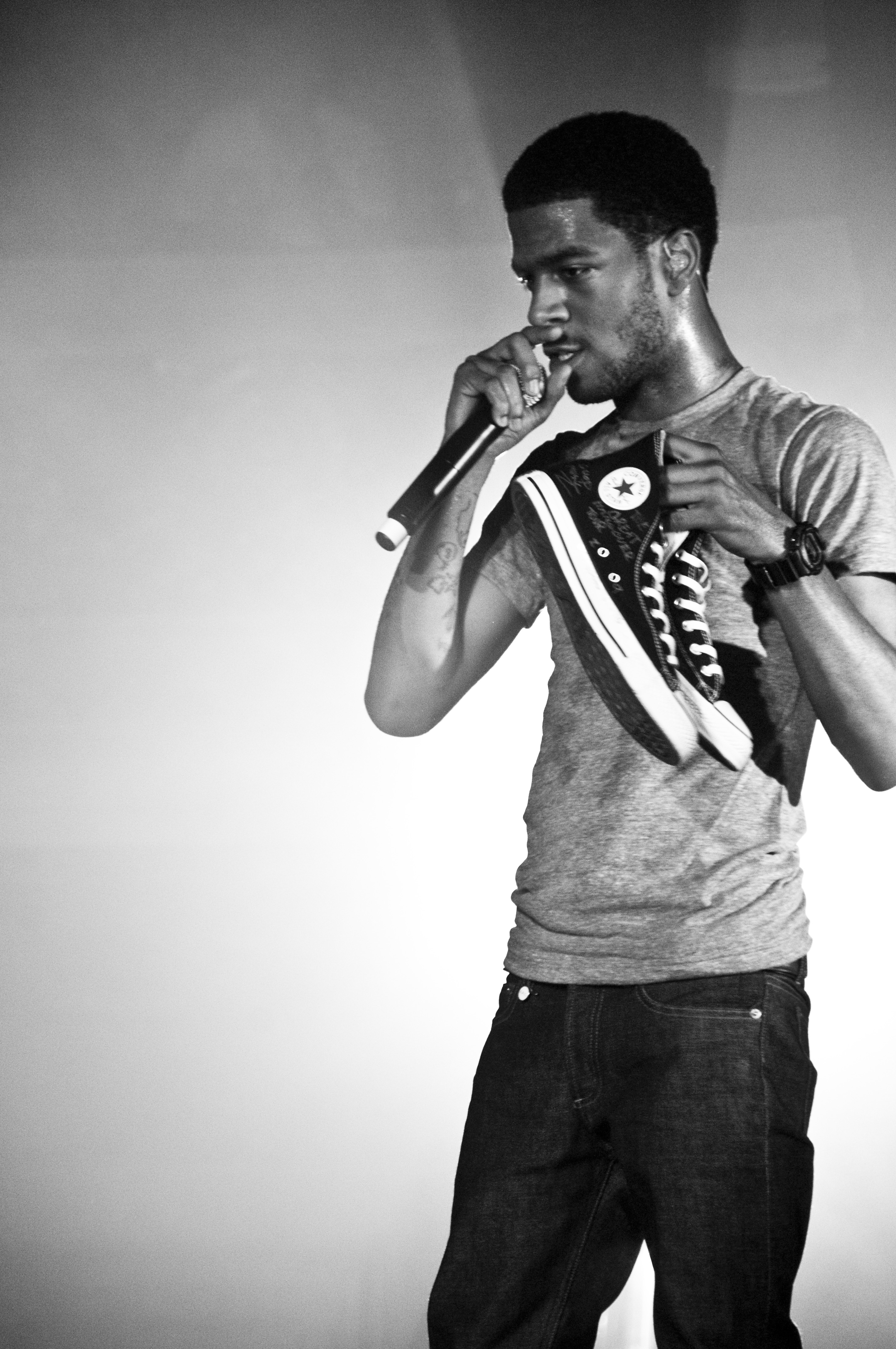
Kid Cudi's appearance on the song was questioned by David Amidon of PopMatters, who felt he brought little to the song.

The song attracted widespread praise by music critics, many of whom ranked it among West's best songs. Pitchfork Media's Ryan Dombal compared elements of the song to the rock band the Strokes, and stated that it contained some of the best lyrics ever written by West. Dan Vidal of URB largely praised the track, writing that it was an excellent song overall, though wrote that "in my personal opinion, I don’t really think Kid Cudi can sing; and I’m not sure why his generally off-key caterwauling is appealing to people, but here it’s hypnotically on point – matching perfectly with the track’s imposing tone." MTV wrote that the song featured West at his most boastful lyrically, musing that "while his lyrics are razor sharp, the production here is softer, resulting in a melodic finger wag to his naysayers rather than searing jabs." David Amidon of PopMatters praised the performance by West on the song but felt that neither guest appearance ultimately left much of an impression. On the other hand, Sputnikmusic's Channing Freeman felt that both Cudi and Raekwon fit perfectly on the guitar-driven track.

Rolling Stone writer Rob Sheffield wrote "nobody else is making music this daring and weird" and described the song as "spooky space funk". The Washington Post's Chris Richards stated "West's moment of post-Beatles anxiety comes during 'Gorgeous,' a song that moans and groans with a dark urgency that permeates this album." Entertainment Weekly's Simon Vozick-Levinson described the song as "narcissistic" and noted West's insults of his critics in the song. Alex Denney of NME praised West's sense of humor on the song and praised the guitar work. Andrew Martin of Prefix Magazine called West's first verse on the song a "bilious rant about racial inequality". AbsolutePunk's Drew Beringer stated that West sounded angry on the song, and viewed that it contained some of his best lyrics. Andrew Barber of Complex stated that the track had several quotable lines, and commented that West was a "frontrunner" for hip-hop's best producers and rappers combinations. Barber called Cudi's hook excellent, and mused that the "guitar riff on the beat will stay stuck in your head for days." Beats Per Minute writer Arika Dean commented, "The song serves as a meditation on what it means to be a different color in a country that’s grown more diverse, but also more scared and more hateful."

The song charted at 23 on the Bubbling Under Hot 100 Singles chart as reported by Billboard, however it only spent one week on the chart. The song also appeared on the South Korean Gaon Chart at 86. In 2018, Billboard placed it third on its list of "Kid Cudi's 10 Best Features".

== Promotion ==
The song was also featured during the third scene of Runaway, a 35-minute music video directed by West set to music from My Beautiful Dark Twisted Fantasy. The song plays during the scene where Selita Ebanks' character inspects around the garden, interacting with the animals and plants, while Kanye watches her from inside. Cudi and West performed the song together at the SXSW musical festival. During the 2011 Lollapalooza festival in Chile, "Gorgeous" was featured on the setlist. West also performed an a cappella version of the song during a concert in New York City. A case of pre-release promotion was exhibited when West, performed a freestyle of the song on Hot 97. The lyrics from the freestyle later became "Gorgeous". West performed the freestyle alongside Pusha T, a rapper signed to his GOOD Music Label. In Ice-T's 2012 movie Something from Nothing: The Art of Rap, West rapped his verses from the song as a cappella.

== Commercial performance ==
The song charted at 23 on the US Billboard Bubbling Under Hot 100 Singles chart upon the release of My Beautiful Dark Twisted Fantasy, however it only spent one week on that chart. The song also charted on the South Korean Gaon Chart, at number 86, and charted at number 38 on the R&B/Hip-Hop Digital Song Sales chart. On August 10, 2018, the song was certified Gold in the United States by the Recording Industry Association of America (RIAA) for equivalent sales of 1,000,000 units in the country. The song was additionally certified Silver by the British Phonographic Industry (BPI) for equivalent sales of 200,000 units in the United Kingdom.

== Personnel ==
- Produced By: Kanye West, No I.D, Mike Dean
- Recorded By: Andrew Dawson, Mike Dean, Noah Goldstein, Phil Joly, Anthony Kilhoffer, Christian Mochizuki at Avex Recording Studio Honolulu, Hi; Electric Lady Studios, NYC
- Mix Engineers: Pete Bischoff, Phil Joly, Anthony Kilhoffer, Christian Mochizuki
- Guitars: Mike Dean, Lenny Kravitz & Ken Lewis
- Bass & Organ: Ken Lewis
- Keyboards: Brent Kolatalo
- Drum Programming: Brent Kolatalo
- Cello: Chris "Hitchcock" Chorney
- Backing Vocals: Tony Williams

== Charts ==
Chart (2010)	Peak Position
South Korea International Singles (Gaon)	86
US Bubbling Under Hot 100 (Billboard)	23
US R&B/Hip-Hop Digital Song Sales (Billboard)	38

== Certifications ==
Region	Certification	Certified units/sales
Denmark (IFPI Danmark)	Gold	45,000^{‡}
New Zealand (RMNZ)	Gold	15,000^{‡}
United Kingdom (BPI)	Silver	200,000^{‡}
United States (RIAA)	Platinum	1,000,000^{‡}
^{‡} Sales+streaming figures based on certification alone.
