= List of awards and nominations received by Kid Cudi =

Kid Cudi awards and nominations
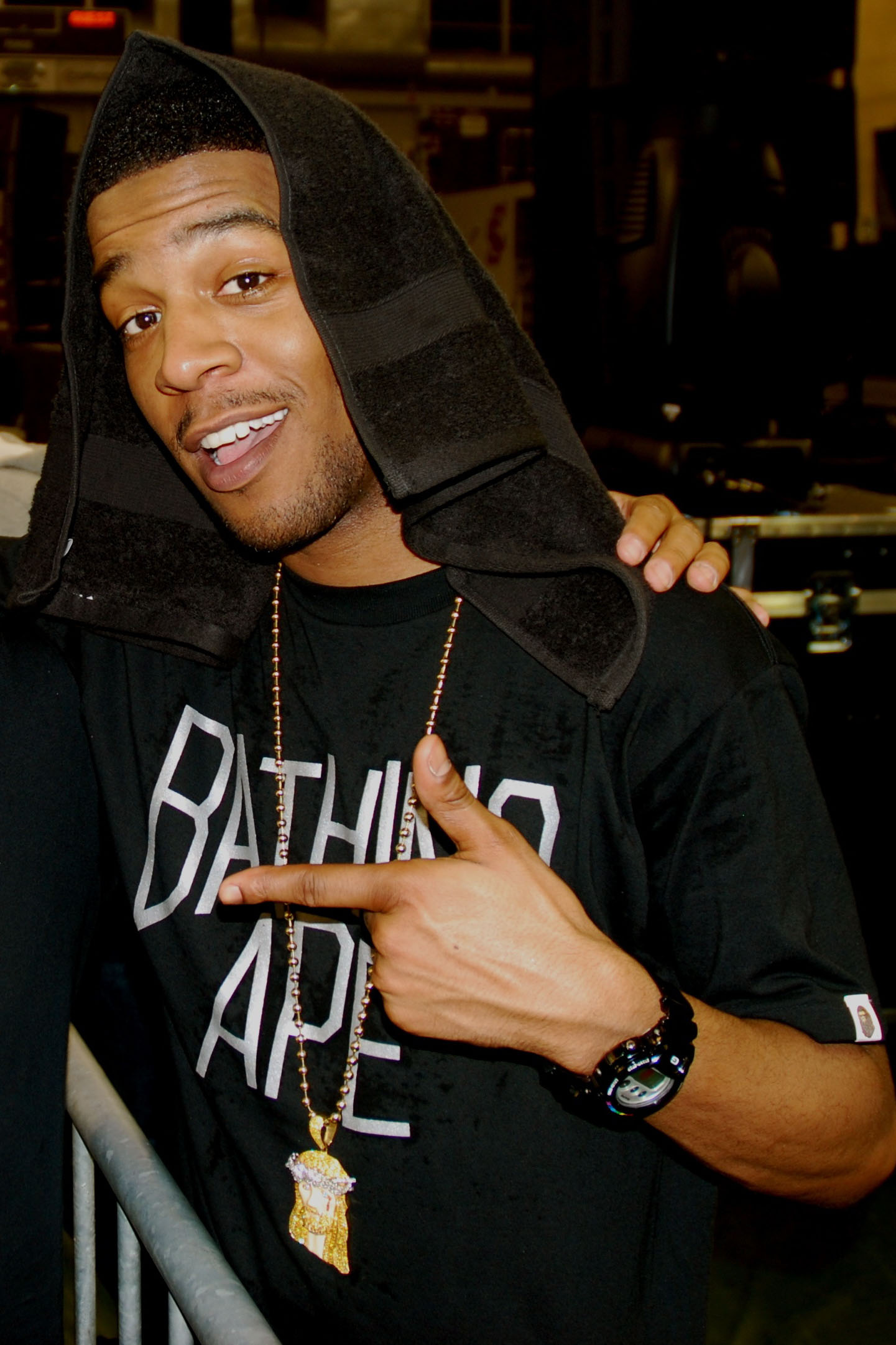
- Kid Cudi at Santa Clara University in September 2009
Awards and nominations
Award	Wins	Nominations

Totals (Note: Certain award groups do not simply award one winner. They acknowledge several different recipients, have runners-up, and have third place. Since this is a specific recognition and is different from losing an award, runner-up mentions are considered wins in this award tally. For simplification and to avoid errors, each award in this list has been presumed to have had a prior nomination.)
- Wins: 11
- Nominations: 43
African-American Film Critics Association	1	1
American Music Awards	0	1
BET Awards	0	1
BET Hip Hop Awards	0	7
Beatport Music Awards	1	1
Black Reel Awards	0	1
Critics' Choice Celebration of Black Cinema Awards	1	1
Critics' Choice Movie Awards	0	3
Grammy Awards	2	6
Hollywood Music in Media Awards	1	2
MTV Movie & TV Awards	0	2
MTV Video Music Awards	0	6
mtvU Woodie Awards	0	1
NAACP Image Awards	2	3
Screen Actors Guild Awards	0	1
Society of Composers and Lyricists Awards	1	1
Teen Choice Awards	0	1
Urban Music Awards	1	2

Kid Cudi (born Scott Ramon Seguro Mescudi) is a Grammy Award winning American recording artist from Shaker Heights, Ohio. After the release of his breakout mixtape A Kid Named Cudi in July 2008, he soon became the protégé of fellow rapper and music producer Kanye West. He released two studio albums on the Dream On, GOOD Music and Universal Motown record labels: Man on the Moon: The End of Day (2009) and Man on the Moon II: The Legend of Mr. Rager (2010). In February 2011, Cudi announced the dissolvement of Dream On, and would subsequently launch a new imprint, Wicked Awesome Records.

Kid Cudi earned his first three Grammy Award nominations in 2010, two for his single "Day 'n' Nite" and one for the collaboration "Make Her Say." In 2012, he won two Grammy Awards for "All of the Lights," a collaboration with Kanye West, Rihanna and Fergie. The release of Cudi's debut album and its lead single "Day 'n' Nite, led to several more honors, including an MTV Video Music Award (VMA). During 2010, Cudi won a Beatport Music Award, as well as an Urban Music Award. In 2011, he was nominated for an additional four VMAs, which he shared with West and Rihanna, and has been nominated for a total of twenty accolades.

In 2021, Cudi appeared in the film Don't Look Up, directed and written by Adam McKay, playing the character DJ Chello. For his role in the film, as well as for his contributions to the film's song, "Just Look Up", written and performed by Cudi and Ariana Grande, he has received numerous nominations, including a Critics Choice Award and a Screen Actors Guild Award.

== African-American Film Critics Association ==
The African-American Film Critics Association (AAFCA) is an annual awards show created by Dick Clark in 1973. Kid Cudi has won one award from one nomination.

Year	Nominated work	Award	Result
2022	"Guns Go Bang" (with Jeymes Samuel and Jay-Z)	Best Music	Won

== American Music Awards ==
The American Music Awards are an annual awards show created by Dick Clark in 1973. Kid Cudi received one nomination.

Year	Nominated work	Award	Result
2009	Kid Cudi	New Artist of the Year	Nominated

== BET ==
=== BET Awards ===
Established in 2001 by the Black Entertainment Television (BET) network to celebrate African Americans and other minorities in music, acting, sports, and other fields of entertainment, the awards are presented annually and broadcast live on BET. Cudi has been nominated once.

Year	Nominated work	Award	Result
2009	Kid Cudi	BET Award for Best New Artist	Nominated

=== BET Hip Hop Awards ===
The BET Hip Hop Awards for hip-hop performers, producers, and music video directors were established in 2006 and are hosted by the BET Hip-Hop network. Cudi has received one award from seven nominations.

Year	Nominated work	Award	Result
2009	Day 'n' Nite	BET Hip Hop Award for Track of the Year	Nominated
2009	Day 'n' Nite	BET Hip Hop Award for Best Hip Hop Video	Won
2009	Kid Cudi	BET Hip Hop Award for Rookie of the Year	Nominated
2009	Kid Cudi	BET Hip Hop Award for Made-You-Look	Nominated
2009	Kid Cudi	Artist of the Year	Nominated
2011	"All of the Lights" (Kanye West featuring Kid Cudi and Rihanna)	Best Hip-Hop Video	Nominated
2011	"All of the Lights" (Kanye West featuring Kid Cudi and Rihanna)	Verizon People's Champ Award (Viewers’ Choice)	Nominated

== Beatport Music Awards ==
With its nominees based solely on Beatport sales data, The Beatport Music Awards aim to recognize electronic music talent. Cudi has won one award from one nomination.

Year	Nominated work	Award	Result
2009	"Day 'n' Nite (Crookers Remix)"	Best Indie Dance / Nu Disco Track	Won

== Black Reel Awards ==
The Black Reel Awards, or BRAs, is an annual American awards ceremony hosted by the Foundation for the Augmentation of African-Americans in Film (FAAAF) to recognize excellence of African Americans, as well as the cinematic achievements of the African diaspora, in the global film industry, as assessed by the foundation's voting membership. Kid Cudi has received one nomination.

Year	Nominated work	Award	Result
2022	"Guns Go Bang" (with Jeymes Samuel and Jay-Z)	Outstanding Original Song	Nominated

=== Black Reel TV Awards ===
The Black Reel TV Awards (TV BRA) is an annual American awards ceremony presented by the Foundation for the Augmentation of African-Americans in Film (FAAAF) to recognize artistic and technical merit of African-Americans and the African diaspora in the television industry.

Year	Nominated work	Award	Result
2023	"Angel"	Outstanding Original Song	Nominated

== CCA ==
=== Critics' Choice Celebration of Black Cinema Awards ===
The Celebration of Black Cinema and Television is an annual ceremony presented by the Canadian American Critics Choice Association (CCA) to honor the cinematic achievements of African American artists. From the event Kid Cudi has won one award.

Year	Nominated work	Award	Result
2022	Scott Mescudi – Entergalactic	Groundbreaker Award	Won

=== Critics' Choice Movie Awards ===
The Critics' Choice Movie Awards is an awards show presented annually by the American-Canadian Critics Choice Association (CCA) to honor the finest in cinematic achievement. Kid Cudi has been nominated three times.

Year	Nominated work	Award	Result
2022	"Just Look Up" (with Ariana Grande)	Best Song	Nominated
2022	"Guns Go Bang" (with Jay-Z)	Best Song	Nominated
2022	Cast of Don't Look Up	Best Acting Ensemble	Nominated

== Grammy Awards ==
The Grammy Awards are awarded annually by the National Academy of Recording Arts and Sciences of the United States. Cudi has been nominated six times and has won twice.

Year	Nominated work	Award	Result
2010	"Day 'n' Nite"	Best Rap Solo Performance	Nominated
2010	"Day 'n' Nite"	Best Rap Song	Nominated
2010	"Make Her Say" (featuring Common and Kanye West)	Best Rap Performance By A Duo Or Group	Nominated
2012	"All of the Lights" (with Kanye West, Rihanna and Fergie)	Best Rap/Sung Collaboration	Won
2012	"All of the Lights" (with Kanye West, Rihanna and Fergie)	Best Rap Song	Won
2022	Donda (as featured artist and songwriter)	Album of the Year	Nominated

== Hollywood Music in Media Awards ==
The Hollywood Music in Media Awards (HMMA) is an award organization honoring original music (Song and Score) in all forms visual media including film, TV, video games, trailers, commercial advertisements, documentaries, music videos and special programs. Cudi has received one award from two nominations.

Year	Nominated work	Award	Result
2021	"Just Look Up" (with Ariana Grande)	Best Original Song	Nominated
2022	"Willing to Trust" (with Ty Dolla Sign)	Original Song – TV Movie Streamed	Won

== MTV ==
=== MTV Movie & TV Awards ===
The MTV Movie & TV Awards (formerly the MTV Movie Awards) is a film and television awards show presented annually on MTV. The first MTV Movie Awards were presented in 1992. The ceremony was renamed the MTV Movie & TV Awards for its 26th edition in 2017 to also honor work in television as well as film.

Year	Nominated work	Award	Result
2012	"Pursuit of Happiness (Steve Aoki remix)"	Best Song from a Movie	Nominated
2022	"Just Look Up" (with Ariana Grande)	Best Song	Nominated

=== MTV Video Music Awards ===
The MTV Video Music Awards (VMA) were established in 1984 by MTV to celebrate the top music videos of the year. Cudi has been nominated six times.

Year	Nominated work	Award	Result
2009	"Day 'n' Nite"	MTV Video Music Award for Best New Artist	Nominated
2010	"Pursuit of Happiness" (featuring MGMT and Ratatat)	MTV Video Music Award for Best Hip-Hop Video	Nominated
2011	"All of the Lights" (Kanye West featuring Kid Cudi and Rihanna)	MTV Video Music Award for Best Collaboration	Nominated
2011	"All of the Lights" (Kanye West featuring Kid Cudi and Rihanna)	MTV Video Music Award for Best Editing	Nominated
2011	"All of the Lights" (Kanye West featuring Kid Cudi and Rihanna)	MTV Video Music Award for Best Hip-Hop Video	Nominated
2011	"All of the Lights" (Kanye West featuring Kid Cudi and Rihanna)	MTV Video Music Award for Best Male Video	Nominated

=== MTVU Woodie Awards ===
A division of Viacom's MTV Networks, the channel MTVU has hosted its own awards show named mtvU Woodie Awards since 2006. He has been nominated once.

Year	Nominated work	Award	Result
2009	"Day 'n' Nite	Best Video Woodie	Nominated

== NAACP Image Awards ==
The NAACP Image Awards is an annual awards ceremony presented by the U.S.-based National Association for the Advancement of Colored People (NAACP) to honor outstanding performances in film, television, theatre, music, and literature.

Year	Nominee / work	Award	Result
2022	The Harder They Fall Soundtrack (as featured artist and songwriter)	Outstanding Soundtrack/Compilation Album	Won
2023	Scott Mescudi, Ian Edelman, Maurice Williams – Entergalactic	Outstanding Writing in a Television Movie or Special	Won
2023	Entergalactic	Outstanding Soundtrack/Compilation Album	Nominated

== Primetime Emmy ==
Year	Nominated work	Award	Result
2023	Entergalactic	Outstanding Animated Program	Nominated

== Screen Actors Guild Awards ==
The Screen Actors Guild Awards (also known as SAG Awards) are accolades given by the Screen Actors Guild-American Federation of Television and Radio Artists (SAG-AFTRA). The award was founded in 1952 to recognize outstanding performances in movie and prime time television.

Year	Nominated work	Award	Result
2022	Don't Look Up	Outstanding Performance by a Cast in a Motion Picture	Nominated

== Society of Composers & Lyricists Awards ==
The Society of Composers & Lyricists is an organization founded in 1983 to represent composers and lyricists working in visual media, such as television and film. Since 2020, the Society of Composers & Lyricists has presented annual awards for music in film, television, and other media. Kid Cudi has received one award.

Year	Nominated work	Award	Result
2022	"Just Look Up" (with Ariana Grande)	Outstanding Original Song for a Comedy or Musical Visual Media Production	Won

== Teen Choice Awards ==
Presented annually by Fox Broadcasting Company since 1999, the Teen Choice Awards honors the year's biggest achievements in fields such as movies, music, television and fashion and is viewer-voted. The rapper has received a single nomination.

Year	Nominated work	Award	Result
2009	Kid Cudi	Choice Music: Breakout Artist	Nominated

== Urban Music Awards ==
The British Urban Music Awards were launched in 2003 to recognize the achievement of urban artists, producers, nightclubs, DJs, radio stations, and record labels. Cudi has won one award from two nominations.

Year	Nominated work	Award	Result
2009	Kid Cudi	Urban Music Award for Best Male Act 2009	Nominated
2009	"Day 'n' Nite"	Urban Award for Best Single 2009	Won
