= Dot da Genius production discography =

The following list is a discography of production by Dot da Genius, an American hip hop record producer from Brooklyn, New York. It includes a list of songs produced, co-produced and remixed by year, artist, album and title.

== Singles produced ==
List of singles produced, with selected chart positions and certifications, showing year released and album name
Title	Year	Peak chart positions										Certifications	Album
Title	Year	US	US R&B	US Rap	AUS	CAN	FRA	GER	NZ	SWE	UK	Certifications	Album
"Day 'n' Nite" (Kid Cudi)	2008	3	5	—	15	10	8	13	11	31	2	RIAA: Diamond; ARIA: Gold; BPI: Gold; RIANZ: Gold	Man on the Moon: The End of Day
"No One Believes Me" (Kid Cudi)	2011	—	—	—	—	—	—	—	—	—	—		Fright Night soundtrack
"Good Die Young" (Elley Duhé)	2019	—	—	—	—	—	—	—	—	—	—		non-album single
"Panini" (Lil Nas X)	2019	5	2	15	8	93	18	26	14	43	21	RIAA: 7× Platinum; ARIA: 2× Platinum; MC: 4× Platinum; RMNZ: Gold	7
"Leader of the Delinquents" (Kid Cudi)	2020	—	—	—	—	—	—	—	—	—	—		non-album single
"The Scotts" (Kid Cudi and Travis Scott as The Scotts)	2020	1	1	1	4	1	2	8	2	8	11	RIAA: Platinum; ARIA: Gold; BPI: Silver; FIMI: Gold; RMNZ: Gold; ZPAV: Platinum	The Scotts
"The Adventures of Moon Man & Slim Shady" (Kid Cudi and Eminem)	2020	22	15	13	90	20	—	—	— (Note: "The Adventures of Moon Man & Slim Shady" did not chart on the NZ Top 40 Singles chart, but did chart at number five on the NZ Hot Singles chart.)	—	44		non-album single
"Stars in the Sky" (Kid Cudi)	2022	—	—	—	—	—	—	—	—	—	—		Sonic the Hedgehog 2 (Music from the Motion Picture)
"—" denotes a recording that did not chart or was not released in that territory.

== 2008 ==
=== Kid Cudi - A Kid Named Cudi ===
- 07. "Day 'n' Nite"
- 16. "Cleveland is the Reason"

Leftover

- 00. "Dat New New"

== 2009 ==
=== Mickey Factz ===
- 00. "Who's Hotter"

=== Kid Cudi - Man on the Moon: The End of Day ===
- 07. "Day 'n' Nite (Nightmare)"

Leftover

- 00. "Highs 'n' Lows"
  - Sample Credit: Bob Dylan - "Lay Lady Lay"
- 00. "Know Why"
- 00. "Dose of Dopeness"

== 2010 ==
=== Fabri Fibra - Controcultura ===
- 10. "Insensibile" (featuring Dargen D'Amico)
- 17. "In Alto" (featuring Simona Barbieri)

=== Kid Cudi - Man on the Moon II: The Legend of Mr. Rager ===
- 05. "Marijuana" (co-produced with Kid Cudi & Mike Dean)
- 17. "Trapped in My Mind" (co-produced with Kid Cudi)
- 18. "Maybe" (iTunes Bonus Track)

== 2011 ==
=== Various artists - Music from and Inspired by the Motion Picture Fright Night ===
- 01. "No One Believes Me" (performed by Kid Cudi) (co-produced with Kid Cudi)

== 2012 ==
=== Chip tha Ripper - Tell Ya Friends ===
- 20. "Ride 4 U" (featuring Kid Cudi & Far East Movement)

=== Rilgood - JFK ===
- 13. "Banga" (Bonus Track)

=== Micahfonecheck - August Rush ===
- 04. "Broke Broke"

=== D-WHY - Don't Flatter Yourself ===
- 15. "So Committed"

=== Mr. MFN eXquire - Power & Passion ===
- 01. "Cari Zalioni"

== 2013 ==
=== Fabri Fibra - Guerra e Pace ===
- 09. "La Solitudine Dei Numeri Uno" (produced with Woodro Skillson)
- 13. "Nemico Pubblico" (produced with Woodro Skillson)
- 16. "Alta Vendita" (produced with Woodro Skillson)

=== Kid Cudi - Indicud ===
- 06. "Immortal" (provided drums & strings)
- 08. "Girls" (featuring Too Short) (provided drums & synths)

=== Rockie Fresh - The Birthday Tape ===
- 05. "Rollin'" (featuring Gunplay)

=== King Chip - 44108 ===
- 10. "Police in the Trunk" (produced with Rami)

=== Mr. MFN eXquire - Kismet: Blue Edition ===
- 25. "Untitled" (featuring Chance the Rapper)

=== Rilgood - Kingdom ===
- 03. "Young Kings" (produced with Woodro Skillson)

=== Various artists - Saint Heron ===
- 11. "Drinking and Driving" (performed by Jhené Aiko)

== 2014 ==
=== Kid Cudi - Satellite Flight: The Journey to Mother Moon ===
- 06. "Too Bad I Have to Destroy You Now" (co-produced with Kid Cudi)

=== Jhené Aiko - Souled Out ===
- 01. "Limbo Limbo Limbo" (additional production from Woodro Skillson)
- 07. "Wading"

=== Various artists - LA Leakers & LRG Presents: Leaks of the Industry '14 ===
- 02. "Everything I Am" (Logic featuring Hit-Boy and Audio Push)

== 2015 ==
=== Fabri Fibra - Squallor ===
- 08. "Cosa Avevi Capito?"

=== Audio Push - Good Vibe Tribe ===
- 06. "Normally" (co-produced with Hit-Boy)

== 2016 ==
=== Travis Scott - Birds in the Trap Sing McKnight ===
- 4. "Through the Late Night" (featuring Kid Cudi)

=== Jesse Boykins III - Bartholomew ===
- 11. "Vegetables" (featuring Willow and Syd)

=== 6LACK - Free 6LACK ===
- 11. "Alone / EA6" (produced with Singawd, 6LACK and Rabitsch)

=== Kid Cudi - Passion, Pain & Demon Slayin' ===
- 15. "Kitchen" (produced with Plain Pat)
- 16. "Cosmic Warrior"
- 17. "The Guide" (featuring André 3000)

== 2017 ==
=== Talib Kweli and Styles P - The Seven ===
- 05. "Teleprompters" (featuring Common and Little Vic) (co-produced with 88-Keys)

=== Jhené Aiko - Trip ===
- 01. "LSD"
- 08. "New Balance" (produced with LeJKeys)
- 12. "Nobody" (co-production)
- 14. "Bad Trip (Interlude)"
- 21. "Ascension" (featuring Brandy) (co-production)
- 23. "Hello Ego" (featuring Chris Brown)
- 24. "Clear My Mind"

== 2018 ==
=== Andrew Lockington - Rampage – Original Motion Picture Soundtrack ===
- 24. "The Rage" (performed by Kid Cudi) (co-production)

=== Kids See Ghosts - Kids See Ghosts ===
- 05. "Reborn" (co-production)
- 07. "Cudi Montage" (co-production)

=== Nas - Nasir ===
- 01. "Not for Radio" (featuring Puff Daddy and 070 Shake) (co-production)
- 04. "Bonjour" (featuring The World Famous Tony Williams) (co-production)

=== Various artists - Rampage – Original Motion Picture Soundtrack ===
- 24. "The Rage" (performed by Kid Cudi) (co-produced by Ben Billions and Infamous)

=== Various artists - The Sound of Electronica, Vol. 13 ===
- 12. "Shirak"

== 2019 ==
=== Elley Duhé ===
- 00. "Good Die Young" (produced with Rami)

=== Lil Nas X - 7 ===
- 02. "Panini" (produced with Take a Daytrip)

== 2020 ==
=== Kid Cudi - Man on the Moon III: The Chosen ===
- 01. "Beautiful Trip" (co-production)
- 02. "Tequila Shots" (co-production)
- 03. "Another Day" (co-production)
- 04. "She Knows This" (co-production)
- 05. "Dive" (co-production)
- 06. "Damaged" (co-production)
- 07. "Heaven on Earth" (co-production)
- 08. "Show Out" (featuring Skepta and Pop Smoke) (co-production)
- 09. "Mr. Solo Dolo III" (co-production)
- 10. "Sad People" (co-production)
- 11. "Elsie's Baby Boy (Flashback)" (co-production)
- 12. "Sept. 16" (co-production)
- 13. "The Void" (co-production)
- 14. "Lovin' Me" (featuring Phoebe Bridgers) (co-production)
- 15. "The Pale Moonlight" (co-production)
- 16. "Rockstar Knights" (featuring Trippie Redd) (co-production)
- 17. "4 Da Kidz" (co-production)
- 18. "Lord I Know" (co-production)

== 2022 ==
=== Denzel Curry - Melt My Eyez See Your Future ===
- 03. "Worst Comes to Worst" (produced with Naz)
- 14. "The Ills" (produced with Noah Goldstein)

== See also ==
- WZRD production discography
