= Entergalactic (album) =

2022 studio album by Kid Cudi

Studio album / Soundtrack by Kid Cudi
- Released: September 30, 2022
- Recorded: 2019
- Genres: Alternative R&B; alternative hip-hop
- Length: 45:40
- Labels: Wicked Awesome; Republic
- Producers: Kid Cudi; Dot da Genius; E. Vax; Gazzo; Hot Sugar; Jean-Baptiste; Plain Pat; Ramii; Roy Lenzo; Skrillex; Steve Aoki; Take a Daytrip; Teo Halm; William J. Sullivan; WondaGurl

Kid Cudi chronology
| The Boy Who Flew to the Moon, Vol. 1 (2022) | Entergalactic (2022) | Insano (2024) |

Singles from Entergalactic
- 1. "Do What I Want" Released: June 10, 2022; 2. "Willing to Trust" Released: September 23, 2022

Entergalactic is the eighth studio album by American musician Kid Cudi. The album was issued on September 30, 2022, by Republic Records and Cudi's Wicked Awesome imprint. The album was released alongside its visual component, an adult animated special of the same name, starring Cudi, exclusively on Netflix. This album features guest vocals from Ty Dolla Sign, 2 Chainz, Steve Aoki and Don Toliver.

The album was initially announced in a 2019 press release, revealing an animated music series created by Cudi, alongside American film producer Kenya Barris, for Netflix, with the album and the series to be released the same day. The dual projects would later be delayed into 2022 in favor of Cudi focusing on the release of Man on the Moon III: The Chosen (2020).

The album includes production from high-profile record producers such as Dot da Genius, Plain Pat, Gazzo, Hot Sugar, Jean-Baptiste, Skrillex, Steve Aoki, WondaGurl and Take a Daytrip, among others. Additionally the album features guest appearances from Ty Dolla Sign, 2 Chainz, Steve Aoki and Don Toliver. Entergalactic was preceded by two singles in support of the album, "Do What I Want" and "Willing to Trust".

== Background ==
In 2009, Cudi released his debut studio album Man on the Moon: The End of Day, to critical acclaim. The album included a song titled "Enter Galactic (Love Connection Part I)", a "trippy disco anthem" that was inspired by when he and a female friend ate psilocybin mushrooms and listened to music by The Postal Service together. In late 2009, Cudi began performing a song titled "Deep Sleep (Love Connection Part II)", which serves as a sequel to the original song, however it was never officially released. In July 2019, Kid Cudi announced a full-length project with the title reminiscent of the 2009 album cut, Entergalactic, which he revealed would soundtrack an upcoming Netflix "adult-focused animated music series" co-created by himself and Black-ish creator Kenya Barris.

Kid Cudi
(@KidCudi)
tweeted:

Entergalactic is a fantasy. It's what I wish I had. I live a very lonely life, but I have hope I'll find someone someday.

July 28, 2019

In Complex's September 2019 cover story, Cudi shared more details on what to expect from the album. Cudi told Complex's Karizza Sanchez he "needed to do something different" this time around with his music, which led to the decision to create a project that would narrate the first season of his Netflix show. "A lot of the songs aren't really from the Scott perspective; they're from the perspective of the character," he explained. Cudi added: "A lot of the songs are about love and relationships. I'm not in a relationship right now, so it's purely written from my imagination and writing as this character." This new approach brought excitement back to the music-making process for Cudi, who had considered taking five years off from music. Cudi went on to say, "I had this idea for the show, and then it was like, 'how can we incorporate the music? How can we have the music be a part of the show?' I initially wanted to make a visual album, but I was like, that's been done before. How can we give it a little twist? How can we do something different? That's how I came up with the idea for the show, Entergalactic. I'm trying my hardest to still introduce new sounds and push the envelope, sonically. So it's still gonna be like everything that people love about Kid Cudi music. The only difference is that it's gonna be told from a different perspective. Some songs, not all songs."

Edwin Ortiz of Complex wrote, "along with the different perspective, fans can expect Entergalactic to highlight Cudi's rap abilities and thoughts on love." Reiterating what Cudi had said, "I have some songs where I'm just rapping—it's just Cudi having fun again, and I think people miss that side of me. I used to do that a lot on my mixtape, so getting back into that was fun, and I think people are gonna be into it. I think this [album] is my perspective on love, and people haven't really heard that. I'm not somebody who makes R&B music, and I'm not somebody who makes lovey-dovey songs like that. I've just never really had much luck in relationships, so I've never had anything to write from. And if I did write about my relationships, it would've been all disasters, so I needed something to inspire me to get me there, to wanna write about relationships, and this show did it for me."

In a November 2019 interview, when speaking on the dual projects, Kenya Barris said, "The idea of there's never been an album and a series dropped at the same time, so each song will have a 30-minute narrative that kind of explains what that song is about and it's a love story . . . It's a youthful love story told through Cudi's music." When speaking on working with Cudi, Barris said, he is someone who "created his own lane" by giving voice to issues often left ignored by other artists at the time of his ascension. Barris added, "He was one of the first rappers to sort of start talking about mental illness, his sort of depression ... We started talking and he's a huge fan of animation and that notion of animation lasts forever." While the music component of Entergalactic is an "amazing album" of "bangers", the series portion aims to give each track a full backstory.

In September 2022, Cudi revealed the album is dedicated to his deceased friend, American fashion designer Virgil Abloh, detailing how the album's release date is also the birth date of Abloh.

== Recording and production ==
Entergalactic is an alternative R&B album that was recorded in 2019. In a July 2019 interview with Kerwin Frost, American drummer Travis Barker revealed he had produced a track for Cudi saying "it has a Nirvana sample but it's on some Cudi rap shit." In a November 2019 interview, American TV producer Kenya Barris said that Cudi fans can expect Dot da Genius, Ty Dolla Sign, and Gucci Mane to appear on the album. In a December 2020 interview with Zane Lowe for Apple Music, Cudi detailed how he went from working on Entergalactic and The Scotts (his collaborative album with Houston-based rapper Travis Scott) to ultimately working on the final installment of his Man on the Moon trilogy.

In September 2021, Cudi took to Twitter to thank the team that helped bring the project to fruition, and reassured fans they would not be disappointed: "Wait til y'all hear and see Entergalactic. U have no idea. I really wanna thank Kenya Barris, Mike Moon, Elizabeth Porter and the whole team for believing in my vision and helping bring it to life. Everything about this show is next level. Ull see."

On January 24, 2022, Cudi took to Twitter to write "ENTERGALACTIC is the greatest piece of art Ive ever made. I am so sooo fuckin proud of this show. U have no idea what ur in for. 3 years in the making. Id say watch the show first then consume the album." He also confirmed the album would be released on the same day as the show, while revealing his favorite part about the whole creation process. "The voice acting was the most fun", he said. "the music too but Ive always wanted to do more voice acting and idk it was like another dream come true foreal."

Kid Cudi
(@KidCudi)
tweeted:

Entergalactic is a Kid Cudi album. Not a sountrack. Please, dont think this is not as important or as big as MOTM3. This is another beautiful solo effort I think U all will enjoy. I need yall all to come out on Sept 30th and support.

September 15, 2022

Shortly after revealing the first single's release date, Cudi divulged information about how "Do What I Want" fits into his collaborative history with production duo Take a Daytrip, revealing the single was the first song he had ever created with Daytrip (prior to his number-one single "The Scotts") and he subsequently began heavily collaborating with them for Man on the Moon III: The Chosen, thereafter.

In an August 2022 interview with Esquire, Cudi revealed he recorded the music first—"a suite of songs on the beauty of being freed by love"—and worked backward to storyboard the narrative before hiring a writing team to script it. As a project, Entergalactic started with three songs, but then the developing film elements began to shape the later songs and vice versa.

== Release and promotion ==
Kid Cudi
(@KidCudi)
tweeted:

Entergalactic will be something you've never experienced. I promise it'll be a fun ride. Lot of good friends involved. Great songs too! The cast is coming together. I know a year from now seems like forever but it'll be here before u know it!

July 22, 2019

In April 2020, Cudi previewed a song titled "Do What I Want", which he said would be included on Entergalactic. Cudi shared the preview during a Thursday night Instagram Live session with Black AF stars Rashida Jones and Kenya Barris, the latter of whom serves as an executive producer on the series that will coincide with the album.

Although the album was originally set for a 2020 release, it was pushed back due to Cudi releasing his long-awaited Man on the Moon III: The Chosen album instead. In January 2021, when asked by a fan on Twitter why Entergalactic's new release date says 2022 on Netflix, Cudi responded, "[Because] that's when it drops. I just gave y'all an album y'all gotta chill and be patient fr [sic] man I'm not doin[g] an album every year."

On May 17, 2021, Kid Cudi reiterated both the Netflix show and Entergalactic would arrive sometime next year in a tweet that read, "Entergalactic album and show droppin 2022 end of summer!! Recorded the first season and couldn't be more hyped for yall to see. Ur gonna be blown away. Next level shit only. Changing the game as always." Later on May 20, Cudi previewed a song from the album on his Instagram story, unveiling a snippet of a song tentatively titled "Wild".

In September 2021, Cudi released a short trailer in promotion for the Netflix series, which revealed the music would be produced by his longtime collaborators Dot da Genius and Plain Pat. On September 11, Cudi teamed up with Richie Akiva, who Forbes dubbed "The King of New York Nightlife", to host "a new late night experience" called Entergalactic. The event was held during New York Fashion Week and among the guests were Travis Scott, ASAP Rocky, Chance the Rapper, French Montana, Joey Badass, Kehlani and Vic Mensa, among others.

During his 2021 headlining performance at the Rolling Loud music festival, Cudi revealed intentions on releasing two full-length projects in 2022, with plans of releasing an album prior to Entergalactic "I have Entergalactic coming in the summer, and I wanna drop another album before that. I got some tasty surprises and I'm really excited about all this new shit, this new music, to give to you guys," he said before playing a recording of a song that has since been dubbed "Freshie", concluding with "That's why I'm teasing this shit now because it's coming out soon." The songs "Wild" and "Freshie" were seemingly set to appear on the unreleased album before Entergalactic.

On April 24, 2022, Cudi took to Twitter to write "Entergalactic is gonna be something really fucking special. Minds will melt. This cast?? The MUSIC?? Listen. U heard it here first. Remember this tweet. Stay tuned for more news in June!" On June 10, 2022, Cudi released the album's lead single, titled "Do What I Want".

On July 12, Cudi revealed on Twitter that the official trailer for the show would premiere in August featuring two new songs, with one of the songs set to be released as the second single. On September 12, Netflix unveiled a new trailer for Entergalactic. On September 16, Cudi announced "Willing to Trust", included in the trailer, as the album's second single, featuring vocals from fellow American singer Ty Dolla Sign.

In September 2022, Cudi starred in an advertisement for Bose, alongside American football player Joe Burrow, with the Entergalactic album cut "Burrow" playing throughout the commercial. On September 28, 2022, Cudi appeared on The Tonight Show Starring Jimmy Fallon, where he was interviewed to promote the album and performed the single "Willing to Trust" alongside Ty Dolla Sign. Upon the project's release, Cudi partnered with Staple and Netflix to release promotional merchandise. The collection features t-shirts, jackets, and beanies, also including a disposable camera and a skate deck. When announcing the album, Cudi also revealed his role as Jabari in the upcoming film he announced when the album was announced.

== Critical reception ==
Professional ratings
Aggregate scores
| Source | Rating |
|---|---|
| Metacritic | 75/100 |
Review scores
| Source | Rating |
| AllMusic | 4/5 stars |
| Complex | (favorable) |
| HipHopDX | 3.7/5 |
| HotNewHipHop | (favorable) |
| Pitchfork | 6.5/10 |
| Rolling Stone | 7.0/10 |
| Vulture | (favorable) |

Entergalactic was met with generally positive reviews from music critics. At Metacritic, which assigns a normalized rating out of 100 to reviews from professional publications, the album received an average score of 75, based on four reviews, indicating "generally favorable reviews". Neil Yeung of AllMusic gave it a 4 out of 5 rating, writing "paired with the highly stylized animation and outer space scene-scapes that pull viewers in and out of modern-day Manhattan, Entergalactic is one of Cudi's most engaging listens, boosted by a balanced blend of hedonist club anthems ('Can't Believe It' with 2 Chainz, 'Do What I Want'), ethereal instrumentals ('Entergalactic Theme'), and lovelorn yearnings ('Angel', 'Ignite the Love')." Mark Braboy of Rolling Stone wrote "Entergalactic continues in the same sonic vein as his 2020 effort, Man on the Moon III: The Chosen, with creamy, dreamy production via longtime collaborator Dot da Genius. This time out, though, the sad, melodramatic tone of Cudi's previous work has been replaced with focused lyrics about falling in love and what it's like to finally open your heart after having it broken so many times."

Joshua Robinson of HotNewHipHop concluded with "for his eighth studio album, Kid Cudi has delivered yet another strong non-MOTM effort, and while he can definitely be commended for releasing an album and dropping a Netflix show on the same day, what's really important to point out is that Entergalactic stands on its own as an LP, with most of its best songs being unassisted solo tracks." Jaelani Williams of Complex noted "Guests on Entergalactic enhance the album's affectionate nature, most notably being Ty Dolla Sign who flawlessly harmonizes with Cudi on 'Willing to Trust'. On solo tracks, including standouts 'New Mode', 'Do What I Want', and 'Ignite the Love', Cudi is at his most energetic and spacey, giving fans Man on the Moon nostalgia."

=== Accolades ===
| Award | Date of ceremony | Category | Recipient(s) | Result | Ref. |
|---|---|---|---|---|---|
| Hollywood Music in Media Awards | November 16, 2022 | Original Song – TV Movie Streamed | "Willing to Trust" written by Kid Cudi, Ty Dolla Sign, Dot da Genius, Evan Mast, Rami Eadeh and Lenzo | Won | |
| NAACP Image Awards | February 22, 2023 | Outstanding Soundtrack/Compilation Album | Entergalactic by Kid Cudi | Nominated | |
| Black Reel TV Awards | June 15, 2023 | Outstanding Original Song | "Angel" written by Kid Cudi, Jean Baptiste, Sadpony and Justin Raisen | Nominated | |

== Commercial performance ==
Entergalactic debuted at number 13 on the US Billboard 200 chart, earning 22,500 album-equivalent units in its first week. This became Cudi's seventh US top-20 debut on the chart. By December 2022, the album had sold 124,000 units.

== Track listing ==
Entergalactic track listing
| No. | Title | Writer(s) | Producer(s) | Length |
|---|---|---|---|---|
| 1. | "Entergalactic Theme" | Oladipo Omishore; William J. Sullivan | Dot da Genius; Kid Cudi; Sullivan | 1:30 |
| 2. | "New Mode" | Scott Mescudi; Omishore | Dot da Genius; Kid Cudi | 3:56 |
| 3. | "Do What I Want" | Mescudi; Omishore; David Biral; Denzel Baptiste; Levi Carter; Roy Lenzo; Russ Chell | Take a Daytrip; Chell; Carter^{[a]}; Lenzo^{[a]} | 2:52 |
| 4. | "Angel" | Mescudi; Jean-Baptiste Kouame; Jeremiah Raisen; Justin Raisen | Dot da Genius; Jean-Baptiste; Raisen; Kid Cudi; Sadpony | 2:26 |
| 5. | "Ignite the Love" | Mescudi; Carlton McDowell; Rex Masamune Kudo | McDowell; Dot da Genius; Heavy Mellow; Kid Cudi; Kudo; Skrillex | 2:42 |
| 6. | "In Love" | Mescudi; Omishore | Dot da Genius; Kid Cudi | 3:38 |
| 7. | "Willing to Trust" (with Ty Dolla Sign) | Mescudi; Omishore; Evan Mast; Rami Eadeh; Lenzo; Tyrone Griffin Jr. | Dot da Genius; E. Vax; Kid Cudi; Ramii | 4:42 |
| 8. | "Can't Believe It" (featuring 2 Chainz) | Mescudi; Omishore; Tauheed Epps; Nick Koenig; Patrick Reynolds | Dot da Genius; Hot Sugar; Kid Cudi; Plain Pat | 2:52 |
| 9. | "Livin' My Truth" | Mescudi; Omishore; Al Green^{[d]}; Vincent Goodyer; Mast | Dot da Genius; Kid Cudi; E. Vax^{[a]}; 18YOMAN^{[a]} | 2:13 |
| 10. | "Maybe So" | Mescudi; Teo Halm; Mid-Air Thief^{[e]} | Dot da Genius; Kid Cudi; Halm | 3:40 |
| 11. | "Can't Shake Her" (with Ty Dolla Sign) | Mescudi; Omishore; Griffin | Dot da Genius; Kid Cudi | 2:56 |
| 12. | "She's Lookin' for Me" | Mescudi; Omishore; Sullivan; Eadeh | Dot da Genius; Kid Cudi; Ramii; Sullivan | 3:35 |
| 13. | "My Drug" | Mescudi; Sullivan; Jarrett Goodly; Margaux Whitney | Dot da Genius; Kid Cudi; Sensei Buenos; Sullivan; Yuli | 2:11 |
| 14. | "Somewhere to Fly" (with Don Toliver) | Mescudi; Ashtyn Watson; Caleb Toliver; Ebony Oshunrinde; Makonnen Sheran; Gary Hill; David Cunningham; Valentin Blavatnik^{[f]} | Dot da Genius; Kid Cudi; Lucy Clubhouse; WondaGurl | 2:56 |
| 15. | "Burrow" (with Don Toliver, Steve Aoki and Dot da Genius) (bonus track) | Mescudi; Toliver; Omishore; Michael Gazzo; Steve Aoki | Dot da Genius; Gazzo; Kid Cudi; Aoki; Derek "206derek" Anderson^{[v]} | 3:31 |
| Total length: | | | | 45:40 |

Note

- ^{^[a]} indicates an additional producer
- ^{^[v]} indicates a vocal producer

Sample credits

- ^{^[d]} "Livin' My Truth" contains an interpolation of "Simply Beautiful", written and performed by Al Green.
- ^{^[e]} "Maybe So" contains a sample of "Crumbling Together", written and performed by Mid-Air Thief.
- ^{^[f]} "Somewhere to Fly" contains a sample of "Tonight", as performed by iLoveMakonnen and written by Makonnen Sheran, Gary Hill, David Cunningham and Valentin Blavatnik.

== Personnel ==
Credits adapted from the liner notes of Entergalactic.

- Kid Cudi – vocals, executive production
- Dot da Genius – executive production
- Joe LaPorta – mastering
- William J. Sullivan – mixing (all tracks), engineering (1–13)
- Finis "KY" White – mixing (8)
- Andrés Osorio – engineering (3, 6, 15)
- Nolan Presley – engineering (8)
- Steve Velez – engineering, programming, string arrangement (10)
- Iain Findlay – engineering (14)
- Derek "206derek" Anderson – vocal mixing (15)
- Patrik Ehrenblad-Plummer – additional engineering (3)
- Chris Kahn – engineering assistance (1–4, 6–8, 10, 11)
- Taylor Jackson – engineering assistance (5)
- Jim McMillen – engineering assistance (10)
- Pharrell Williams – background vocals (6)
- Ken "Duro" Ifill – A&R
- Chloe Clements – A&R coordinator
- Fletcher Moules – art direction and design
- Michał Sawtyruk – cover paintings

== Charts ==
Chart performance for Entergalactic
| Chart (2022) | Peak position |
|---|---|
| Australian Albums (ARIA) | 94 |
| Belgian Albums (Ultratop Flanders) | 86 |
| Belgian Albums (Ultratop Wallonia) | 92 |
| Canadian Albums (Billboard) | 20 |
| Dutch Albums (Album Top 100) | 87 |
| French Albums (SNEP) | 73 |
| Lithuanian Albums (AGATA) | 88 |
| New Zealand Albums (RMNZ) | 37 |
| Norwegian Albums (VG-lista) | 40 |
| Swiss Albums (Schweizer Hitparade) | 38 |
| UK Albums (Official Charts) | 95 |
| US Billboard 200 | 13 |
| US Top R&B/Hip-Hop Albums (Billboard) | 7 |

== Release history ==
Release dates and formats for Entergalactic
| Region | Date | Label(s) | Format(s) | Ref |
|---|---|---|---|---|
| Various | September 30, 2022 | Wicked Awesome; Republic | Digital download; streaming | |
| Various | November 18, 2022 | Wicked Awesome; Republic | CD | |
| Various | January 13, 2023 | Wicked Awesome; Republic | LP | |

== See also ==
- Entergalactic (TV special)
- Entergalactic (Original Score)
