= No One Believes Me =

Single by Kid Cudi

from the album Music from and Inspired by the Motion Picture Fright Night
- Released: August 23, 2011
- Recorded: 2011
- Genre: Alternative rock; space rock
- Length: 5:02
- Label: Wicked Awesome; GOOD; Universal Republic
- Songwriters: Scott Mescudi; Oladipo Omishore
- Producers: Dot da Genius; Kid Cudi

Kid Cudi singles chronology
"All of the Lights" (2010)	"No One Believes Me" (2011)	"Just What I Am" (2012)

Music video
- "No One Believes Me" on YouTube

"No One Believes Me" is a song by American musician Kid Cudi, written and produced alongside his fellow WZRD bandmate Dot da Genius, for the 2011 horror film Fright Night. The song was released on August 23, 2011 for digital download. Kid Cudi and Dot da Genius wrote the track staying true to the original Fright Night (1985) but also to "stand on its own, separate from the soundtrack".

== Background ==
The song features Kid Cudi on guitar, as well as him accompanying Dot da Genius on drums, while Dot da Genius solely handled bass and piano. The duo wrote the track after being contacted to provide a song to the 2011 remake of Fright Night. "I kind of wrote it to the original Fright Night and I wanted to stay true to the plot and story," said Cudi. "We were inspired to create the song for the movie, which is something I've never done before. It was a challenge. I didn't want it to be a cheesy, cliché type of record. I wanted it to be something people could play and absorb and enjoy without thinking this is for the Fright Night movie."

== Music video ==
Craig Gillespie, the director of Fright Night remake, also directed the music video for the song. In the video, Kid Cudi plays a vampire who walks through the streets of a suburban neighborhood as he experiences terrible events take place for the residents. He slowly becomes guilt ridden especially after entering a home with a family that has already been bitten in their sleep, presumably by him. The video ends with daybreak coming and Kid Cudi exiting the house and allowing himself to immediately get incinerated by the sunlight. In an interview with MTV, Kid Cudi explained that his character in the video is tired of being a vampire, and is not really affected by the tragic events that occur in the video. The music video, which features dialog from the film Fright Night, was released August 12, 2011.

== Release history ==
List of release dates, showing region, release format, and label
Country	Date	Format	Label	Ref
United States	August 23, 2011	Digital download	Universal Republic	
