= A Kid Named Cudi =

Mixtape by Kid Cudi
- Released: July 17, 2008
- Recorded: 2007–2008
- Genre: Alternative hip hop
- Length: 49:35
- Labels: 10.Deep; Fool's Gold
- Producers: Crookers; Dot da Genius; Emile; The Kickdrums; Nosaj Thing; Plain Pat; Ratatat

Kid Cudi chronology
A Kid Named Cudi (2008)	Man on the Moon: The End of Day (2009)

Alternate cover
- 2022 reissue cover

Singles from A Kid Named Cudi
- 1. "Day 'n' Nite" Released: February 5, 2008

A Kid Named Cudi is the debut mixtape by American rapper Kid Cudi, released on July 17, 2008, by New York City streetwear brand 10.Deep, in conjunction with independent record label Fool's Gold Records. The mixtape features guest appearances from Chip Tha Ripper and Wale. Considered his breakout project, the mixtape marked Cudi's first official release, issued prior to his debut album Man on the Moon: The End of Day (2009).

Production was handled by Plain Pat and Emile; samples range from Outkast to Paul Simon and N.E.R.D to Band of Horses. The mixtape allowed a new progression of Kid Cudi with the release catching the ear of Kanye West, founder of GOOD Music, whom Cudi would ultimately be signed to later that year. Notably, the album contains the song "Day 'n' Nite", Kid Cudi's commercial debut single, which reached number three on the US Billboard Hot 100 chart.

The mixtape received favorable reviews from music critics, and is also largely credited with establishing Cudi's fan base. Cudi reissued a re-mastered version of A Kid Named Cudi, 14 years after its original release, on July 15, 2022, via Republic Records. The mixtape was reissued following Cudi's first greatest hits album The Boy Who Flew to the Moon, Vol. 1 (2022) and prior to his eighth solo album Entergalactic (2022), also preceding his 2022 global concert tour To the Moon.

== Background ==
In 2005, Kid Cudi moved from his hometown Shaker Heights, Cleveland, Ohio to New York City in pursuit of a career in music. Upon moving to NYC, Cudi stayed with his uncle, accomplished jazz drummer Kalil Madi, in the South Bronx. While working different Manhattan retail jobs to support himself, he would go on to make several connections in the music industry, the first being American record executive Plain Pat at a Def Jam meeting. He would later be kicked out by his uncle and forced to find a new place; the parents of Dot da Genius, a new frequent collaborator of Cudi, allowed him to stay with their family in Brooklyn, as long as he kept creating music with their son. The following connection Cudi made was through a friend of Plain Pat, a high-profile hip hop producer by the name of Emile Haynie, who discovered Cudi through social media site MySpace, where Cudi had uploaded the Dot da Genius-produced track "Day 'n' Nite".

In 2007, Cudi would meet American disc jockey A-Trak, who would go on to sign Cudi to officially release "Day 'n' Nite" as a single, through his label imprint Fool's Gold Records. As "Day 'n' Nite" would climb major music charts, the three would work towards creating Cudi's first full-length release. With its production overseen by Plain Pat and Emile Haynie, Cudi's debut mixtape would be released on July 17, 2008, by NYC streetwear brand 10.Deep, in conjunction with indie record label Fool's Gold. The mixtape would serve as the catalyst for Cudi to sign to GOOD Music, the label imprint of American rapper Kanye West. Plain Pat, who was West's A&R at the time, had previously introduced him to Cudi's music. He would officially sign with GOOD Music after West called upon Cudi to help work on his fourth album 808s & Heartbreak (2008), where Cudi impressed West, ultimately contributing vocals to two songs ("Welcome to Heartbreak" and "Paranoid") and co-writing two more ("Heartless" and "RoboCop").

== Promotion ==
On February 5, 2008, Fool's Gold Records released "Day 'n' Nite" as a single via digital distribution and 12-inch vinyl. An electro-house remix produced by Italian duo Crookers and an abundance of rappers recording their own verses over the original production, helped Cudi gain major recognition.

In April 2008, Cudi released a music video for a song titled "Heaven at Nite". Directed by American filmmaker Vashtie Kola, it features Cudi in a party scene throughout the video. When speaking on the record, Cudi said "the 'Heaven at Nite' is in the sense of nightlife being heaven; going out and drowning your sorrows and trying to lighten up your spirits. But at the same time, you can see it in somebody's face that their mind is on something completely different." On May 12, 2008, Cudi released a trailer for the mixtape, which garnered considerable attention on hip hop blog sites.

== Critical reception ==
Upon its release the mixtape received favorable reviews from music critics, and is also largely credited with establishing Cudi's fan base. Guido Stern of Rapreviews wrote "Kid Cudi is creating the biggest buzz out of Cleveland since Bone Thugs", concluding with "We've already learned from Lil Wayne and Kanye West that the public is willing to embrace the martian—if accordingly entertaining. Fortunately, Kid Cudi isn't short in that respect, and will no doubt only improve upon his stellar debut given proper management and artistic liberation." Pinpoint Music wrote "A Kid Named Cudi blends styles, beats and even genres. From a Mims-esque 'This Is Why I'm Hot' beat in the single 'Day ‘N’ Night', to the slowed down tracks 'Man on the Moon' and '50 Ways to Make a Record' that will remind you of something by Gym Class Heroes. Heavy-hitting tracks 'T.G.I.F.' and 'Cleveland Is the Reason' finish the mixtape strong with clear influences from Mr. West on both tracks."

Ian A. of Teen Ink wrote "His work has changed my persona on rap music greatly. Everyone out there who thinks rap is stupid, just listen to some of Kid Cudi's music and hopefully you will change your mind." In a 2013 article for The BoomBox, the author wrote: "On [A Kid Named Cudi], Cudi raps and croons over samples and interpolations of Gnarls Barkley, Paul Simon, Band of Horses, J Dilla, Nosaj Thing, N.E.R.D. and Outkast. He melded indie rock, electronica and dubstep seamlessly with hip-hop without pandering or reaching. Before Drake broke through with 2009’s So Far Gone, rapping and singing over Swedish indie poppers Lykke Li and Peter Bjorn and John, Cudi tweaked with multi-genre covers and seamless transitions between singing and rapping."

== 2022 reissue ==
=== Background ===
In 2021, Cudi revealed plans to upload the mixtape on to streaming services in the US. The early 2020s saw popular mixtapes from the late 2000s be reissued on platforms such as Spotify and Apple Music, including Cudi's Republic Records label-mates Lil Wayne with No Ceilings (2009) and Nicki Minaj with Beam Me Up Scotty (2009). In January 2022, Cudi gave an update on the process citing sample clearance issues. On March 9, 2022, during a performance on Encore, the virtual concert app Cudi launched earlier in February, Cudi announced that the mixtape would be coming to streaming platforms “very soon” and would also receive a vinyl release.

=== Release ===
On July 4, 2022, Cudi announced that the mixtape would be officially issued to streaming services on July 15, just two days shy of the 14th anniversary of its original release. Cudi also revealed that he recorded a new intro, and all songs have been remastered. On July 10, Cudi revealed the re-issue would feature new cover art. Cudi unveiled the new album cover the following day, detailing how "this photo was taken by Mel D. Cole on 9.22.08 in NYC. Right before my life changed forever."

The mixtape was commercially re-released and made available on streaming services for the first time, on the announced date of July 15, with "50 Ways to Make a Record" being the only track omitted from the reissue. Cudi revealed that the track could not be cleared for an official release.

== Track listing ==
A Kid Named Cudi track listing
No.	Title	Writer(s)	Producer(s)	Length
1.	"Intro"		Plain Pat; Emile	0:50
2.	"Down & Out"	Scott Mescudi; André Benjamin; Antwan Patton	OutKast	4:09
3.	"Is There Any Love?" (featuring Wale)	Mescudi; Emile Haynie; Trevor Dandy; Mark Hasselbach; Paul Zaza; Olubowale Akintimehin	Emile	3:31
4.	"CuDi Get"	Mescudi; Jim Leva; Neville Holder	J Dilla	2:20
5.	"Man on the Moon (The Anthem)"	Mescudi; Jason Chung	Nosaj Thing	3:27
6.	"The Prayer"	Mescudi; Benjamin Bridwell; Patrick Reynolds; Christopher Early; Howard Simmons; Montay Humphrey; Tramar Dillard; Faheem Najm; Korey Roberson; Timothy Meinig	Plain Pat	3:39
7.	"Day 'n' Nite"	Mescudi; Oladipo Omishore	Dot da Genius	2:48
8.	"Embrace the Martian"	Mescudi; Francesco Barbaglia; Andrea Fratangelo	Crookers	3:26
9.	"Maui Wowie"	Mescudi; John Stephens; Kanye West; Jeremy Hannah; Andre Wallace; Tony Castillo; Rick Shobin	Grind Mode	2:24
10.	"50 Ways to Make a Record"	Mescudi; Paul Simon	Plain Pat; Emile	2:55
11.	"Whenever"	Mescudi; Benjamin; Robert Kelly	André 3000	2:04
12.	"Pillow Talk"	Mescudi; Bernard Jackson; David Townsend; David Conley	Bernard Jackson	3:24
13.	"Save My Soul (The CuDi Confession)"	Mescudi; Brian Burton; Thomas Callaway; Francesco De Masi	Danger Mouse	2:03
14.	"T.G.I.F." (featuring Chip tha Ripper)	Mescudi; Charles Worth; Alex Fitts; Matt Pentilla	The Kickdrums	2:23
15.	"CuDi Spazzin'"	Mescudi; Pharrell Williams; Chad Hugo	The Neptunes	3:06
16.	"Cleveland Is the Reason"	Mescudi; Omishore; Benjamin; Patton	Dot da Genius	3:46
17.	"Heaven at Nite"	Mescudi; Evan Mast; Michael Stroud	Ratatat	3:17

Notes

- "Intro" differs from the original on the 2022 reissue.
- "Maui Wowie" features additional vocals by John Legend on the 2022 reissue.
- "50 Ways to Make a Record" is omitted from the 2022 reissue.

Sample credits

- "Down & Out" samples "Chonkyfire" as performed by Outkast.
- "Is There Any Love?" samples "Is there Any Love?" as performed by Trevor Dandy.
- "Cudi Get" samples "Wild" as performed by J Dilla, which in turn contains samples of "Cum on Feel the Noize" by Neil Innes & Son.
- "Man on the Moon (The Anthem)" samples "Aquarium" as performed by Nosaj Thing.
- "The Prayer" samples "The Funeral" as performed by Band of Horses.
- "The Prayer" contains an interpolation of "Low" written by Tramar Dillard and Faheem Najm.
- "Maui Wowie" samples "I'm So High" as performed by Grind Mode.
- "Maui Wowie" contains an interpolation of "Let's Get Lifted" written by John Stephens, Kanye West and Rick Shobin.
- "50 Ways to Make a Record" samples "50 Ways to Leave Your Lover" as performed by Paul Simon.
- "Whenever" samples "Pink & Blue" as performed by Outkast.
- "Pillow Talk" samples "Happy" as performed by Surface.
- "Save My Soul (The Cudi Confession)" samples "Who's Gonna Save My Soul" as performed by Gnarls Barkley.
- "Cudi Spazzin'" samples "Spaz" as performed by N.E.R.D.
- "Heaven at Nite" samples "Tacobel Canon" as performed by Ratatat.

== Personnel ==
Credits for A Kid Named Cudi adapted from AllMusic.

- Chip tha Ripper – featured artist
- Crookers – producer
- Dot da Genius – engineer, mixing, producer
- Emile Haynie – engineer, executive producer, keyboards, producer, synthesizer
- The Kickdrums – producer
- Kid Cudi – vocals, art direction, design, director, executive producer
- Patrick "Plain Pat" Reynolds – executive producer
- Wale – featured artist

Credits for A Kid Named Cudi (re-release) adapted from AllMusic.

- Olubowale Akintimehin – composer
- Francesco Barbaglia – composer
- André Benjamin – composer
- Ben Bridwell – composer
- Brian Burton – composer
- Thomas Callaway – composer
- Tony Castillo – composer
- Chip tha Ripper – primary artist, vocals
- Jason Chung – composer
- David Conley – composer
- Crookers – primary artist, producer
- Trevor Dandy – composer
- Francesco De Masi – composer
- Tramar Dillard – composer
- Chris Early – composer
- Alex Fitts – composer
- Andrea Fratangelo – composer
- Chris Gehringer – mastering engineer
- Dot Da Genius – mixing, producer, programming, recording
- Jeremy Hannah – composer
- Gabriel Mark Hasselbach – composer
- Emile Haynie – composer, mixing, producer, programming, recording
- Neville Holder – composer
- Montay Humphrey "DJ Montay" – composer
- Ken "Duro" Ifill – A&R
- Bernard Jackson – composer
- Robert Kelly – composer
- The Kickdrums – producer, programming
- Kid Cudi – executive producer, primary artist, producer, sound design, vocals
- James Lea – composer
- John Legend – vocals
- Evan Mast – composer
- Tim Meinig – composer
- Scott Mescudi – composer
- Bryan Montesano – A&R
- Faheed Rasheem Najm – composer
- Oladipo Omishore – composer
- Antwan Patton – composer
- Matt Penttila – composer
- Plain Pat – executive producer, producer
- Patrick Reynolds – composer
- Korey Roberson – composer
- Rick Shobin – composer
- Howard Simmons – composer
- John Stephens – composer
- Michael Stroud – composer
- William J Sullivan – mixing, recording, sound design, vocals
- Edward Townsend – composer
- Wale – primary artist
- Andre Wallace – composer
- Kanye West – composer
- Pharrell Williams – composer
- Charles Worth – composer
- Paul Zaza – composer

== Release history ==
Release dates and formats for A Kid Named Cudi
Region	Date	Format(s)	Version	Label(s)	Ref
Various	July 17, 2008	CD; Free download	Original	10.Deep; Fool's Gold	
Various	July 15, 2022	Digital download; streaming	2022 reissue	Wicked Awesome; Republic	
Various	TBA	LP	2022 reissue	Wicked Awesome; Republic	

== See also ==
- List of songs recorded by Kid Cudi
