= Talk About Me =

2022 song by Dot da Genius, JID, Denzel Curry, and Kid Cudi

Single by Dot da Genius, JID, Denzel Curry, and Kid Cudi
- Released: June 24, 2022
- Recorded: 2019–2022
- Genre: Hip-hop
- Length: 3:05
- Label: HeadBanga Muzik Group
- Songwriters: Oladipo Omishore; Destin Route; Denzel Curry; Scott Mescudi
- Producer: Dot da Genius

Dot da Genius singles chronology
"Fettuccine" (2018)	"Talk About Me" (2022)

JID singles chronology
"Surround Sound" (2022)	"Talk About Me" (2022)	"Dance Now" (2022)

Denzel Curry singles chronology
"Troubles" (2022)	"Talk About Me" (2022)	"Get Lit Or Die Tryin'" (2022)

Kid Cudi singles chronology
"Stars in the Sky" (2022)	"Talk About Me" (2022)	"Willing to Trust" (2022)

"Talk About Me" is a song by American record producer Dot da Genius and American rappers JID, Denzel Curry, and Kid Cudi. It was released on June 24, 2022, through Dot da Genius' HeadBanga Muzik Group imprint. It was accompanied by a music video directed by Cole Bennett for Lyrical Lemonade.

== Background and release ==
Dot da Genius and Kid Cudi have been collaborators for over fifteen years (as of 2022). Dot and Denzel Curry have collaborated on the latter's album, Melt My Eyez See Your Future; Curry and JID have also collaborated multiple times before. "Talk About Me" is Cudi's first collaboration with both Curry and JID.

Work on the song began three years before the release, in 2019. The song's music was written by Dot da Genius, while the lyrics were written by the rappers.

The song was intended to be the lead single from Dot's upcoming debut album, though the album did not release. It was announced by Cudi on June 22, 2022, in a video he posted to Twitter. It was released on June 24 through Dot's record label, HeadBanga Muzik Group.

== Music video ==
A music video directed by Cole Bennett premiered alongside the single on June 24, 2022, on Lyrical Lemonade's official YouTube channel. It features computer-generated graphics and depicts all four of the artists in a black-and-white aesthetic, with Dot taking on the role of a "mad genius" observing the rappers from behind surveillance cameras. The video received positive feedback: Tom Breihan of Stereogum called it "slick and energetic", praising "kingmaking director Cole Bennett".

== Critical reception ==
"Talk About Me" received positive feedback. Hypebeast named it one of the best songs released in that week; Consequence did the same, adding that "Based on [this song] alone, Dot da Genius' debut effort deserves plenty of anticipation." Tom Breihan of Stereogum called all of the verses "great". Armon Sadler of Uproxx wrote: "It makes sense that, as [the rappers] say in the song's hook, everybody on the block is talking about them."
