= Day 'n' Nite =

2008 single by Kid Cudi

Single by Kid Cudi

from the album A Kid Named Cudi and Man on the Moon: The End of Day
- B-side: "Dat New 'New'"; Remixes
- Released: February 5, 2008
- Recorded: October 2007
- Studio: Headbanga (Brooklyn, New York)
- Genre: Hip hop; pop
- Length: 2:48 (mixtape version); 3:41 (album version); 3:06 (video/radio edt); 2:43 (single version)
- Label: GOOD; Fool's Gold; Universal Motown; Data
- Songwriters: Scott Mescudi; Oladipo Omishore
- Producers: Dot da Genius; Kid Cudi

Kid Cudi singles chronology
"Day 'n' Nite" (2008)	"Welcome to the World" (2009)

Audio sample
- "Day 'n' Nite": file; help

Music video
- "Day 'n' Nite" on YouTube

"Day 'n' Nite" is the debut single by American rapper Kid Cudi. The song was written and produced by Cudi alongside his longtime collaborator and friend, Brooklyn-based producer Dot da Genius. It was issued as Cudi's commercial debut single on February 5, 2008, but had initially been released on Cudi's MySpace page and later featured on several music blogs in November 2007.

The single, which was included on his breakout mixtape A Kid Named Cudi (2008), also serves as the lead single from his debut studio album Man on the Moon: The End of Day (2009). The song has since been certified diamond (10× platinum) in the United States. The song peaked at number three on the US Billboard Hot 100. It also reached the top 10 in Belgium, Canada, France, the Netherlands, and the United Kingdom. The song was ranked at number 15 on the "Best 25 Songs of 2009" list by Rolling Stone and also ranked at number seven on Complex's "100 Best Songs of The Complex Decade".

== Background ==
As a young man, Cudi moved from his hometown of Cleveland, Ohio, to New York City, to pursue a music career. Upon his arrival, he stayed with his uncle, accomplished drummer Kalil Madi. His uncle later kicked him out, which subsequently led to Cudi writing "Day 'n' Nite":

"My uncle that I lived with passed in 2006. We were actually beefing because he forced me out the house when I didn’t have another situation set up, so I was bitter. I never apologized for it, and that kills me. That’s why I wrote "Day 'n' Nite." If he wasn’t there to let me stay with him those first few months, there would be no Kid Cudi. It fucked me up watching him go, but it was like, "I have to fulfill this destiny now for sure." Things were moving but they weren’t solidified yet. I had "Day ’n’ Nite," we were just getting started, and I was like, "This shit has got to pop off." I wasn’t taking no for an answer."

On Cudi's debut album Man on the Moon: The End of Day, the song is listed as "Day 'n' Nite (Nightmare)", following the album's dream sequence. In 2012, in an interview with Complex, Kid Cudi revealed that the 1991 single "Mind Playing Tricks on Me" by the Geto Boys also inspired him to write and record "Day 'n' Nite", saying: "My Mind Playing Tricks On Me is my favorite song in the world. I love it so much I wanted to make my own version of it. And then 'Day 'N' Nite' came out of it."

In January 2014, Cudi announced he had recorded a remix of the song the day after he made the original in 2007. He revealed a snippet of the remix was briefly previewed on the intro of his 2008 breakout mixtape A Kid Named Cudi. The remix was slated to appear on 2014's Satellite Flight: The Journey to Mother Moon, however it failed to make the cut and was ultimately unreleased.

== Release ==
The single was released February 5, 2008, as a digital download. It was released prior to Kid Cudi's signing to the GOOD Music label. The song initially appeared on Cudi's first official project, a mixtape titled A Kid Named Cudi, released in July 2008, in collaboration with New York street-wear brand 10.Deep as a free download. The mixtape caught the attention of Kanye West, whose then-manager Plain Pat, had introduced Cudi's music to him, subsequently leading West to sign Cudi to his GOOD Music imprint later that year.

== Music videos ==
There were three music videos filmed for "Day 'n' Nite". The first, a pop art style video, was directed by the French director So Me, who previously worked on music videos with a similar style such as Justice's "D.A.N.C.E." and Kanye West's "Good Life". The pop art music video was produced by Imetrages and also features a brief cameo appearance from Travis Barker. It features Cudi walking around Los Angeles, doing a variety of mundane activities such as getting a slice of pizza, grocery shopping, or visiting a bar, but the overlay of graphic colors on top of the actual video disguises or transforms the daily scene into one of fantasy. These fantasized versions of reality reference the film The Wizard of Oz and later manifest Cudi's desire to perform music; ultimately they play on the song's theme of the "lonely stoner" whose quotidian existence transforms because of his ability to "free his mind." The video features interior and exterior shots of Los Angeles bar, The Smogcutter (located on Virgil) and the somewhat iconic video game arcade, "Family Arcade" (located on Vermont in Hollywood). The music video ranked at number 10 on BET's Notarized: Top 100 Videos of 2009 countdown. It has received over 260 million views on YouTube.

The second version was made specifically for the "Crookers Remix" of the song. It features Cudi as an employee at a typical British corner shop called "Day 'n' Nite", with a reference that he smoked marijuana after his manager left him with the keys. Throughout the video, Cudi has several hallucinations, such as women taking off their clothes, or dancing for him. A minor joke in the beginning is the manager character mispronouncing the name Budi (Cudi's character), a reference to the popular media confusion regarding the pronunciation of "Cudi", as many people pronounced it "Kid Cooty" when he first emerged. Curiously, all products are British and pricing on the shelves is in pounds Sterling but pricing on labels behind the till are in Dollars. The manager also has an English accent while the police woman is in an American police uniform. The video was released without Cudi's permission and he expressed displeasure with it. He issued an explanation on his blog, asking that all bloggers remove the video from their blogs.

The music video was filmed in an old 24 hour Londis shop on Lordship Lane in East Dulwich, South London. The shop is now a Superdrug store.

The third video that was released (also for The Crookers remix) was actually shot before the others in 2008, by New York directing duo, BBGUN. The video was made before Cudi was signed with Universal Motown on a budget of $250. It was BBGUN's directorial debut and was premiered on Pitchfork on September 9, 2009.

== Covers and influence ==
The song is parodied on American singer "Weird Al" Yankovic's thirteenth album Alpocalypse, in his signature polka medley series, "Polka Face". "Day 'n' Nite" has been covered by American alternative rock band Sugar Ray, live in concert and have recorded their version for RAWsession. The song was also covered by American experimental punk rock band ChainGang. British electropop singer-songwriter Little Boots, recorded her rendition and uploaded it to YouTube. It was also interpolated by American rapper Travis Scott on his track, “Through the Late Night”, which features Cudi. In 2022, British rock band Coldplay covered the song and officially released it through Spotify Singles. Also in 2022, Canadian soul band Chiiild, released a cover of the song exclusively through Amazon Music, as part of their Black History Month rollout. In 2023, American alternative rock band SUNVOLUME covered the song.

=== Crookers remix ===
"Day 'n' Nite (Remix)"
- UK single cover

Single by Kid Cudi vs. Crookers
- Released: January 12, 2009
- Genre: Electro house
- Length: 4:42; 2:42 (radio edit)
- Label: Fool's Gold; Data
- Songwriter: Scott Mescudi
- Producer: Crookers

US single cover

Audio sample
- "Day 'n' Nite (Remix)": file; help

"Day 'n' Nite" was remixed by Italian production duo Crookers. The remix was first published as a free download by Fool's Gold Records in March 2008, and released commercially in the United States in August 2008. It was released in the United Kingdom in January 2009 through Data Records, debuting and peaking at number two on the UK Singles Chart for two weeks, behind Lady Gaga's "Just Dance". The remix also charted throughout Europe, reaching the top ten in Belgium, the Netherlands and France. In Australia, the remix and the original charted separately, with the remix reaching number 15 while the original reached number 40. The remix had been selected by BBC Radio 1 Xtra presenter MistaJam as his weekly "Jam Hot" record in April 2008, and was song of the week on Belgian radio station Studio Brussel in December 2008. The Crookers remix is often played during his concerts, as a continuation of the original version. At the Beatport Music Awards of 2009, with nominees selected by unit sales on Beatport within 2008, the Crookers remix won the category "Best Indie Dance / Nu Disco Track".

== In other media ==
In 2022, the song was featured in the trailer for American television miniseries Moon Knight.

The song was also featured in the video games NBA Live 09, Watch Dogs and Fortnite Festival.

The Crookers remix of the song was featured in the soundtrack for the 2008 video game Midnight Club: Los Angeles, and its PSP port Midnight Club: L.A. Remix.

== Formats and track listings ==
US
No.	Title	Length
1.	"Day 'n' Nite"	3:42
2.	"Day 'n' Nite" (instrumental)	3:43
3.	"Day 'n' Nite" (Jokers of the Scene Extended Remix)	7:21
4.	"Dat New "New""	4:14
5.	"Dat New "New"" (Clean)	4:14
6.	"Dat New "New"" (instrumental)	3:49

UK
No.	Title	Length
1.	"Day 'n' Nite" (Radio Edit)	2:42
2.	"Day 'n' Nite" (Club Mix)	4:41
3.	"Day 'n' Nite" (Original Hip Hop Mix)	3:41
4.	"Day 'n' Nite" (Mobin Master Remix)	7:17
5.	"Day 'n' Nite" (Bimbo Jones Vocal Mix)	8:11
6.	"Day 'n' Nite" (Agent X Remix)	5:10
7.	"Day 'n' Nite" (TC Remix)	4:05

UK CD 1
No.	Title	Length
1.	"Day 'n' Nite" (Radio Edit)	2:43
2.	"Day 'n' Nite" (Mobin Master Edit)	3:10

UK CD 2
No.	Title	Length
1.	"Day 'n' Nite" (Radio Edit)	2:43
2.	"Day 'n' Nite" (Club Mix)	4:41
3.	"Day 'n' Nite" (Mobin Master Remix)	7:18
4.	"Day 'n' Nite" (Bimbo Jones Vocal Mix)	8:11
5.	"Day 'n' Nite" (D.O.N.S. Remix)	7:32
6.	"Day 'n' Nite" (Agent X Remix)	5:11
7.	"Day 'n' Nite" (TC Remix)	4:06
8.	"Day 'n' Nite" (music video)	3:05

UK 12-inch vinyl
No.	Title	Length
1.	"Day 'n' Nite" (Club Mix)	4:41
2.	"Day 'n' Nite" (Mobin Master Remix)	7:18
3.	"Day 'n' Nite" (Bimbo Jones Vocal Mix)	8:11
4.	"Day 'n' Nite" (D.O.N.S. Remix)	7:32

US 12-inch vinyl
No.	Title	Length
1.	"Day 'n' Nite" (main)
2.	"Day 'n' Nite" (instrumental)
3.	"Day 'n' Nite" (Jokers of the Scene Remix)
4.	"Dat New "New"" (dirty)
5.	"Dat New "New"" (clean)
6.	"Dat New "New"" (instrumental)

== Charts ==
=== Weekly charts ===
Weekly chart performance for "Day 'n' Nite"
Chart (2008–2009)	Peak position
Australia (ARIA) Crookers remix	15
Australia (ARIA) Original	40
Austria (Ö3 Austria Top 40)	19
Belgium (Ultratop 50 Flanders)	2
Belgium (Ultratop 50 Wallonia)	3
Canada Hot 100 (Billboard)	10
CIS Airplay (TopHit)	62
Denmark (Tracklisten)	11
Europe (European Hot 100 Singles)	8
Finland (Suomen virallinen lista)	18
France (SNEP)	8
Germany (GfK)	13
Hungary (Rádiós Top 40)	18
Hungary (Dance Top 40)	8
Ireland (IRMA)	13
Netherlands (Dutch Top 40)	4
Netherlands (Single Top 100)	4
New Zealand (Recorded Music NZ)	11
Russia Airplay (TopHit) Crookers Remix	55
Scottish Singles Sales (Official Charts)	5
Sweden (Sverigetopplistan)	31
Switzerland (Schweizer Hitparade)	18
UK Singles (Official Charts)	2
UK Dance (Official Charts)	1
US Billboard Hot 100	3
US Dance Club Songs (Billboard)	42
US Dance Airplay (Billboard)	2
US Hot R&B/Hip-Hop Songs (Billboard)	5
US Pop Airplay (Billboard)	16
US Rhythmic Airplay (Billboard)	1

=== Year-end charts ===
Year-end chart performance for "Day 'n' Nite"
Chart (2009)	Position
Australia (ARIA) Crookers Remix	84
Austria (Ö3 Austria Top 40) Crookers Remix	59
Belgium (Ultratop 50 Flanders) Crookers Remix	10
Belgium (Ultratop 50 Wallonia)	17
Brazil (Crowley) Crookers Remix	69
Canada (Canadian Hot 100)	62
CIS (Tophit) Crookers Remix	188
France (SNEP) Crookers Remix	38
Hungary (Dance Top 40)	24
Hungary (Rádiós Top 40)	77
Netherlands (Dutch Top 40) Crookers Remix	58
Netherlands (Single Top 100) Crookers Remix	88
Russia Airplay (TopHit) Crookers Remix	153
Switzerland (Schweizer Hitparade) Crookers Remix	50
UK Singles (Official Charts Company)	33
US Billboard Hot 100	28
US Dance/Mix Show Airplay (Billboard)	8
US Hot R&B/Hip-Hop Songs (Billboard)	59
US Rhythmic (Billboard)	6

== Certifications ==
Certifications for "Day 'n' Nite"
Region	Certification	Certified units/sales
Brazil (Pro-Música Brasil)	Gold	30,000^{‡}
Denmark (IFPI Danmark)	Platinum	90,000^{‡}
New Zealand (RMNZ)	4× Platinum	120,000^{‡}
United States (RIAA)	Diamond	10,000,000^{‡}
^{‡} Sales+streaming figures based on certification alone.

Certifications for "Day 'n' Nite" (Remix)
Region	Certification	Certified units/sales
Australia (ARIA)	Gold	35,000^{^}
Belgium (BRMA)	Gold	
Germany (BVMI)	3× Gold	450,000^{‡}
Italy (FIMI)	Gold	35,000^{‡}
United Kingdom (BPI)	2× Platinum	1,200,000^{‡}
^{^} Shipments figures based on certification alone.^{‡} Sales+streaming figures based on certification alone.

== Accolades ==
=== BET Hip Hop Awards ===
BET Hip Hop Award accolades for "Day 'n' Nite"
Year	Award	Result
2009	BET Hip Hop Award for Track of the Year	Nominated
2009	BET Hip Hop Award for Best Hip Hop Video	Nominated

=== Beatport Music Awards ===
Beatport Music Award accolades for "Day 'n' Nite"
Year	Award	Result
2009	Beatport Music Awards for Best Indie Dance / Nu Disco track (Crookers Remix)	Won

=== MTV Video Music Awards ===
MTV Video Music Award accolades for "Day 'n' Nite"
Year	Award	Result
2009	MTV Video Music Award for Best New Artist	Nominated

=== Grammy Awards ===
Grammy Award accolades for Day 'n' Nite"
Year	Award	Result
2010	Grammy Award for Best Rap Solo Performance	Nominated
2010	Grammy Award for Best Rap Song	Nominated

== Release history ==
Region	Date	Format(s)	Version(s)	Label	Ref.
United States	February 5, 2008	Digital download	Original; Instrumental; Jokers of the Scene remix	Fool's Gold	
United States	February 2008	12-inch vinyl	Original; Instrumental; Jokers of the Scene remix	Fool's Gold	
Worldwide	March 2008	Free digital download	Crookers remix	Fool's Gold	
United States	August 5, 2008	Digital download	Crookers remix	Fool's Gold	
United Kingdom	January 11, 2009	Digital download	Various	Data	
United Kingdom	January 12, 2009	CD single	Crookers remix (radio edit); Mobin Master edit	Data	
United Kingdom	January 12, 2009	CD single	Various	Data	
France	February 9, 2009	Digital download	Various	Happy Music	
France	February 20, 2009	Digital download	Various	Happy Music	
Germany	March 13, 2009	Digital download	Various	Ministry of Sound	
United States	March 20, 2009	Digital download	Original	Universal Motown	
United States	March 20, 2009	Digital download	Crookers remix	Universal Motown	
Australia	June 15, 2009	CD single	Crookers remix; Original; Instrumental	Universal Motown	
