= Entergalactic (TV special) =

2022 animated feature film

- Promotional poster
- Genre: Musical; Romantic comedy-drama; Adult animation
- Created by: Scott Mescudi; Kenya Barris
- Based on: Entergalactic by Kid Cudi
- Written by: Ian Edelman; Maurice Williams
- Story by: Scott Mescudi
- Directed by: Fletcher Moules
- Voices of: Scott Mescudi; Jessica Williams; Ty Dolla Sign; Timothée Chalamet
- Music by: Kid Cudi; Dot da Genius; Plain Pat
- Countries of origin: United Kingdom; United States
- Original language: English

Production
- Executive producers: Kenya Barris; Scott Mescudi; Karina Manashil; Maurice Williams; Ian Edelman; Fletcher Moules; Dennis Cummings
- Producers: Michael Penketh; Mike Moon
- Editor: Carole Kravetz Aykanian
- Running time: 92 minutes
- Production companies: Khalabo Ink Society; Mad Solar Productions; DNEG Animation; Netflix Animation Studios

Original release
- Network: Netflix
- Release: September 30, 2022

Entergalactic (stylized in all caps) is a 2022 adult animated musical romantic comedy film created by American musician and actor Kid Cudi, that serves as a visual companion piece to the album of the same name. Initially announced as a television series, in August 2022, Entergalactic was then redeveloped as a feature film. The film premiered on September 30, 2022, exclusively on Netflix, simultaneously with the album.

Directed by Fletcher Moules, it is based on the album, which Cudi recorded before storyboarding the television film. Alongside Cudi, it stars the voices of Jessica Williams, Timothée Chalamet, Ty Dolla Sign, Laura Harrier, Vanessa Hudgens, Christopher Abbott, 070 Shake, Teyana Taylor, Jaden Smith, Keith David, Arturo Castro, and Macaulay Culkin.

Entergalactic uses an art style inspired by that of Spider-Man: Into the Spider-Verse (2018) and When Harry Met Sally... (1989). Billed as a "television event", it received critical acclaim for its animation, visual style, music, and story. Entergalactic is dedicated to Cudi's deceased friend, American fashion designer Virgil Abloh, who served as a costume designer on the project before his death, with the release date coinciding with Abloh's birth date.

== Plot ==
Jabari is a graffiti artist living in New York City who moves into a new apartment in Manhattan after his character, Mr. Rager, is picked up for a comic book series. Around this time, he reconnects with his ex-girlfriend Carmen. The two spend a night together, but Jabari tells her he isn't interested in getting back into a relationship.

Not long after moving in, Jabari meets his neighbor Meadow, a photographer preparing for an exhibition. They first meet when Jabari complains about noise coming from her apartment. Meadow later invites him to lunch to make up for it, and the two begin spending more time together. They eventually start dating.

Things become complicated when Meadow finds messages from Carmen on Jabari's phone, including a picture of Carmen wearing his hoodie. Meadow believes he has been cheating on her, but Jabari had only visited Carmen to help her get rid of a rat and left his hoodie behind by accident. He tries to explain what happened, but Meadow decides they should spend some time apart.

While they are separated, Jabari continues working on his comic book and Meadow focuses on her upcoming exhibition. Both still have feelings for each other. Jabari attends Meadow's exhibition but leaves before they have a chance to talk.

After the exhibition, Meadow finds a piece of Jabari's artwork pointing her toward the restaurant where they first had lunch together. She goes there and meets Jabari, and the two kiss and get back together.

== Voice cast ==
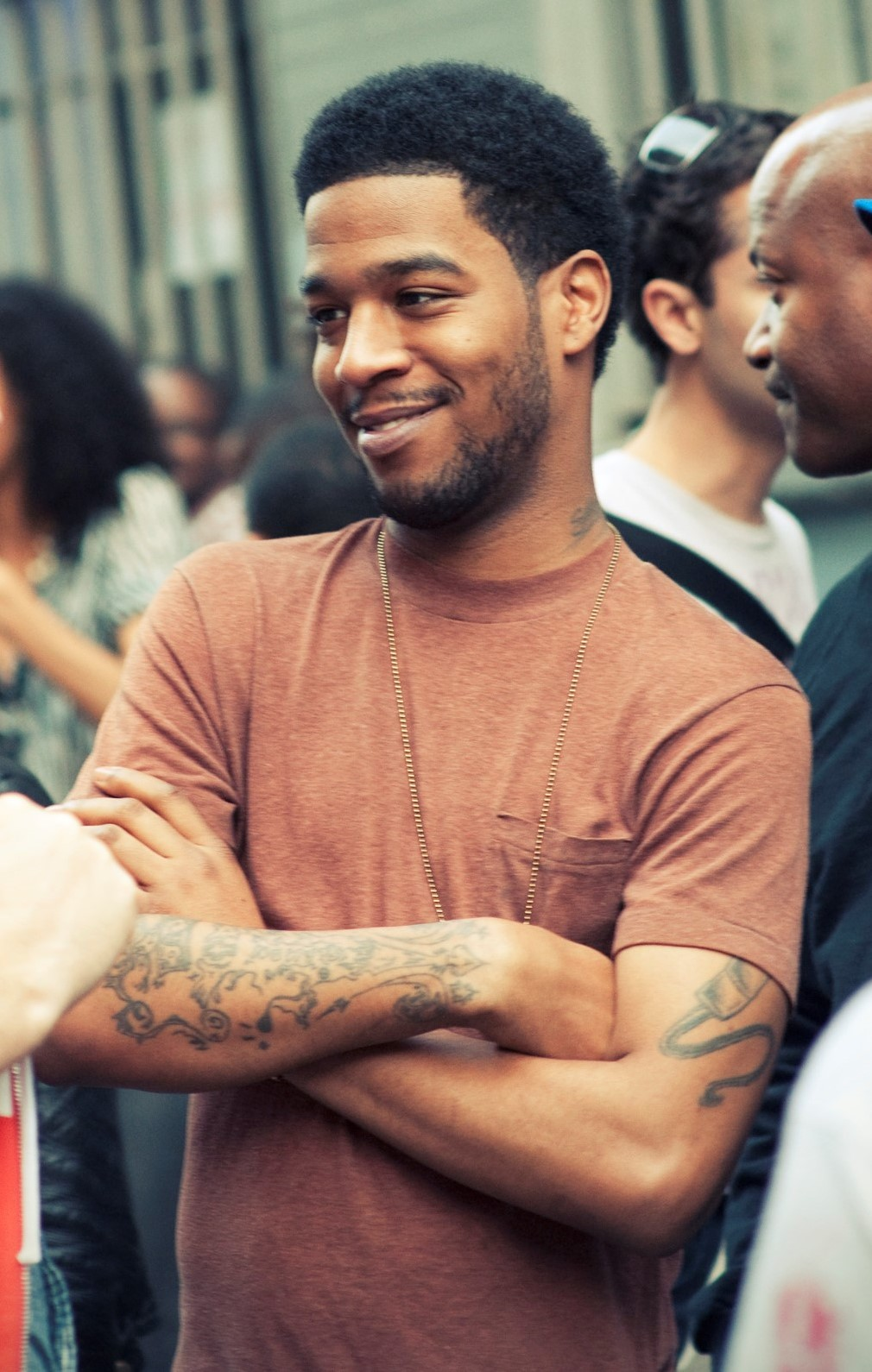
Kid Cudi in 2010

- Scott Mescudi as Jabari
- Jessica Williams as Meadow Watson, Jabari's love interest
- Laura Harrier as Carmen, Jabari's ex-girlfriend
- Ty Dolla Sign as Ky, Jabari's friend
- Timothée Chalamet as Jimmy, Jabari's friend and drug dealer
- Vanessa Hudgens as Karina, Meadow's pregnant best friend
- Christopher Abbott as Reed, an art dealer and Meadow's friend
- Keith David as Mr. Rager
- Arturo Castro as Len, Jabari's co-worker
- Jaden Smith as Jordan, a local skater
- 070 Shake as Nadia
- Macaulay Culkin as Downtown Pat, a local skater
- Maisha Mescudi as Ellie, Jabari's older sister
- Francesca Reale as Sydnie
- Teyana Taylor as boxing instructor
- Luis Guzmán as huge mover
- Bill Lobley as Oleg / New Yorker / taxi driver

== Production ==
=== Development ===
On July 23, 2019, Netflix announced that Kid Cudi and Ian Edelman would write and produce what was originally going to be an animated music TV series adaptation of Cudi's album Entergalactic. Cudi had previously collaborated with Edelman in 2010, on the HBO series How to Make It in America and Cudi starred as William in the 2018 film The After Party, which Edelman directed. Cudi serves as an executive producer alongside Kenya Barris, through their respective production companies Mad Solar Productions and Khalabo Ink Society.

Kid Cudi originally planned for Entergalactic to be a live-action series, before Kenya Barris convinced him to make it an animated series. In a November 2019 interview, when speaking on the dual projects, Barris said, "The idea of there's never been an album and a series dropped at the same time, so each song will have a 30-minute narrative that kind of explains what that song is about and it's a love story . . . It's a youthful love story told through Cudi's music."

In September 2021, Cudi took to Twitter to thank the team that helped bring the project to fruition, and reassured fans they wouldn't be disappointed: "Wait til y'all hear and see Entergalactic. [You] have no idea. I really wanna thank Kenya Barris, Mike Moon, Elizabeth Porter and the whole team for believing in my vision and helping bring it to life. Everything about this show is next level. Ull [sic] see."

In an August 2022 interview with Esquire, Cudi revealed he recorded the music first—"a suite of songs on the beauty of being freed by love"—and worked backward to storyboard the narrative before hiring a writing team to script it.

On August 25, 2022, it was announced in a press release Entergalactic would instead be released as a television special. On October 1, Cudi clarified on Twitter: "Its a series but done in a very unique way broken up into chapters not episodes designed for binging! So, it feels like a movie [because] its an hour and a half and can be seen in one sitting but this is a series. Hope that makes sense. The goal is for more seasons."

=== Casting ===
In July 2019, Cudi was cast in the series. In June 2022, Jessica Williams, Timothée Chalamet, Ty Dolla Sign, Laura Harrier, Vanessa Hudgens, Christopher Abbott, 070 Shake, Teyana Taylor, Jaden Smith, Keith David, Arturo Castro, and Macaulay Culkin were revealed to be the rest of the cast. On June 8, Cudi revealed his real-life older sister, Maisha, would voice his on-screen older sister Ellie, among other voices.

=== Animation, design, and influences ===
The animation was handled and drawn by DNEG Animation in London, which also co-produced the film. A 3D map of New York was downloaded and rebuilt in the pipeline. Influences for the film's design were I Lost My Body (2019) and When Harry Met Sally... (1989).

== Music ==
Entergalactic (Original Score)

Film score by Dot da Genius and Plain Pat
- Released: October 14, 2022
- Genre: Film score
- Length: 37:00
- Label: Netflix Music
- Producers: Dot da Genius and Plain Pat

Kid Cudi's eighth solo album Entergalactic doubles as a soundtrack for the TV special. The album consists of original songs performed by Cudi, of which the TV special is based on. The special has two soundtracks: a film score and Kid Cudi’s eighth studio album.

Additionally, a film score composed entirely by American record producers Dot da Genius and Plain Pat, was released on October 14, 2022, by Netflix Music, LLC.

Other songs featured in the TV special include "By Design" by Kid Cudi featuring André 3000, "Inside My Love" by Minnie Riperton, "In My Bed (So So Def Mix)" by Dru Hill and "Feudal Castle" by Derek Fiechter and Brandon Fiechter.

Entergalactic (Original Score)
- All music composed by Dot da Genius and Plain Pat, except where noted.

Entergalactic (Original Score) track listing
| No. | Title | Length |
|---|---|---|
| 1. | "Afternoon & Murakami" | 2:15 |
| 2. | "The Nomad Bar" | 2:09 |
| 3. | "Ky Vision" | 2:29 |
| 4. | "Jimmy's Vision" | 1:49 |
| 5. | "Chinatown Night" (Oladipo Omishore) | 1:49 |
| 6. | "Las Lap" | 2:52 |
| 7. | "Waverly Inn" (Omishore) | 2:27 |
| 8. | "Carmen's Instagram" | 2:17 |
| 9. | "Presentation 2" (Omishore) | 1:11 |
| 10. | "Getting Ready" | 1:19 |
| 11. | "Vagina Party" | 3:09 |
| 12. | "Loft Party" | 1:57 |
| 13. | "Meadow's Show" (Omishore) | 2:44 |
| 14. | "DPP" | 2:12 |
| 15. | "Nightmare" | 1:53 |
| 16. | "Ky's Flashback" | 1:20 |
| 17. | "Stush Ad" (Omishore) | 1:53 |
| 18. | "Presentation 2 Complete" (Omishore) | 1:03 |
| Total length: | | 37:00 |

== Themes ==
Entergalactic deals with black love, creative identity, and emotional futurity through the lives and relationship of Jabari and Meadow. Both work in New York City where Jabari is a street artist and comic book creator for Cosmic Comics and Meadow is a photographer. They meet while living in the same apartment building and begin a relationship that focuses on mutual care. The film highlights Jabari’s vibrant imagination and affection for Meadow to reimagine black masculinity. This portrayal of black love focuses on emotional vulnerability and creativity over stereotypical romantic comedies that reduce black men to physical traits and overlook their emotional complexity.

The film contributes to the Afrofuturism genre as it combines an imagined reality and focus on urban life and the black experience. Graffiti and city streets blend with outer-space imagery and music moves the story into dream sequences that create a futuristic feel. Changes in color and space depict how characters experience different surroundings and emotions. This animated world imagines possibilities for black futures through everyday experiences of intimacy, artistic expression, and imagination.

== Release ==
On September 15, 2021, Cudi revealed that the series, and the album, is set to premiere in 2022. In September 2021, Cudi released a short trailer in promotion for the Netflix series, which revealed the music would be produced by his longtime collaborators Dot da Genius and Plain Pat.

On April 24, 2022, Cudi wrote on Twitter: "Entergalactic is gonna be something really fucking special. Minds will melt. This cast?? The MUSIC?? Listen. [You] heard it here first. Remember this tweet. Stay tuned for more news in June!" On June 8, Netflix unveiled the "first look" at Entergalactic, in a trailer that also revealed the cast.

On June 10, the first original song created for the series, titled "Do What I Want", was issued on streaming platforms as the album's first official single. On July 12, Cudi revealed on Twitter, the official trailer for the show will premiere in August, featuring two new songs, with one of the songs set to be released as the second single. On September 12, Netflix unveiled a new trailer for Entergalactic, which included the aforementioned single, "Willing to Trust".

== Reception ==
=== Critical response ===
On the review aggregator website Rotten Tomatoes, 97% of 30 critics' reviews are positive, with an average rating of 8.40/10. Metacritic, which uses a weighted average, assigned the film a score of 77 out of 100, based on 10 critic reviews, indicating "generally favorable" reviews.

Rendy Jones of Paste wrote, "Entergalactic is as sweet a romantic comedy as it is an ethereal animated odyssey. It's a stylish, colorful love letter to animation and the simplicity of Black love in the modern age. It feels like the lovechild between When Harry Met Sally and Spider-Verse for a Black demographic, who deserve stories like this no matter what medium they're presented in." Chase Hutchinson of Collider wrote, "A rare gem of an animated work, Kid Cudi guides us on a sublime journey that explores the bond between two people drawn together by love."

Justin Charity of The Ringer wrote, "It's saucy and cute, which is to say, it's a sharp attitude adjustment for such a dreary rapper and refreshingly effective as such. Netflix's Entergalactic is a feature-length promotional complement to his latest album, but it's also a creative breakthrough in its own right." Rachel Ho of Exclaim! gave it a 8/10 rating, stating that "the story of Jabari and Meadow may be one we all know very well, but it's the world of Entergalactic that captures the imagination, sonically and visually."

Joshua Alston of Variety concluded with "what's available of Entergalactic is frequently intoxicating. Director Fletcher Moules doesn't miss a single opportunity to add beautifully animated flourishes to the script written by Mescudi, Ian Edelman, and Maurice Williams. There are sublime musical numbers, for lack of a better term, that let Mescudi's music breathe and crank the visuals to 11. But the shifts between Entergalactic's spacy elements and its grounded moments aren't always smooth, another consequence of the series-to-special evolution. There's much to love about Mescudi's love story, except the fact that there isn't more of it to love."

=== Accolades ===
| Award | Date of ceremony | Category | Recipient(s) | Result | Ref. |
|---|---|---|---|---|---|
| Hollywood Music in Media Awards | November 16, 2022 | Original Song – TV Movie Streamed | "Willing to Trust" written by Kid Cudi, Ty Dolla Sign, Dot da Genius, Evan Mast, Rami Eadeh and Lenzo | Won | |
| Critics Choice Celebration of Black Cinema and Television | December 5, 2022 | Groundbreaker Award | Scott Mescudi for Entergalactic | Won | |
| NAACP Image Awards | February 22, 2023 | Outstanding Writing in a Television Movie or Special | Scott Mescudi, Ian Edelman, Maurice Williams | Won | |
| NAACP Image Awards | February 22, 2023 | Outstanding Soundtrack/Compilation Album | Entergalactic | Nominated | |
| Annie Awards | February 25, 2023 | Outstanding Achievement for Character Animation in an Animated Television / Broadcast Production | Aziz Kocanaogullari | Nominated | |
| Annie Awards | February 25, 2023 | Outstanding Achievement for Character Design in an Animated Television / Broadcast Production | Meybis Ruiz Cruz | Nominated | |
| Black Reel Television Awards | June 15, 2023 | Outstanding Television Movie or Limited Series | Entergalactic | Nominated | |
| Black Reel Television Awards | June 15, 2023 | Outstanding Musical Score | Dot Da Genius and Plain Pat | Nominated | |
| Black Reel Television Awards | June 15, 2023 | Outstanding Original Song | "Angel" written by Kid Cudi, Jean Baptiste, Sadpony and Justin Raisen | Nominated | |
| Primetime Emmy Awards | January 10, 2024 | Outstanding Animated Program | Entergalactic | Nominated | |
| Primetime Emmy Awards | January 10, 2024 | Outstanding Individual Achievement in Animation | Meybis Ruiz Cruz | Won | |

== Future ==
On October 1, 2022, Kid Cudi revealed via Twitter that while Entergalactic was "like a movie", its purpose was closer to that of a television pilot, revealing that he intended to produce "more seasons" ("hour and a half"-long films) making up an Entergalactic series, per the project's original announcement as being a television series. In December 2022, Cudi revealed that although Entergalactic is a standalone special, he is working on a new animated project. In July 2025, Cudi explained that he "asked [Netflix] multiple times about doing another season", but regardless of its critical acclaim and Emmy success, "they weren't into it" because "it didn't stream the way they expected".
