= Trevor Dandy =

- Born: Jamaica
- Origin: Toronto, Canada
- Genres: gospel, funk
- Instrument: vocals
- Years active: 1970s-present

Trevor Dandy is a Jamaican-born Canadian gospel and funk musician active in the 1970s.

== Career ==
Born in Jamaica, Dandy emigrated to Toronto in the 1960s. His 1970 album Don't Cry Little Tree was produced by Paul Zaza's custom label Zaza Productions.

The song Is There Any Love from Don't Cry Little Tree. was re-issued as a single-sided single by Chicago record label The Numero Group in 2010 in a limited pressing of 200 copies. The song has been sampled by Kid Cudi ("Is There Any Love"), Monsters of Folk ("Dear God"), The Roots ("Dear God 2.0") Ghostface Killah ("Drama"), Common ("Kingdom"), and B. Dolan ("Marvin").

In 2017, Dandy released the album "Sing Hallelujah".

== Discography ==
Albums

- Don't Cry Little Tree (1970)
- Sing Hallelujah (2017)

Singles

- Is There Any Love (1970; reissued in 2010)
