= Man on the Moon: The End of Day =

Studio album by Kid Cudi
- Released: September 15, 2009
- Recorded: 2007–2009
- Studios: Avex (Honolulu); The Broski Room (New York City); Chung King (New York City); Jim Henson (Hollywood); Record Plant (Hollywood)
- Genres: Alternative hip-hop; psychedelia; progressive rap
- Length: 58:33
- Labels: Dream On; GOOD; Universal Motown
- Producers: Crada; Dot da Genius; Emile Haynie; Free School; Jeff Bhasker; Kanye West; The Kickdrums; Matt Friedman; Plain Pat; Ratatat

Kid Cudi chronology
A Kid Named Cudi (2008)	Man on the Moon: The End of Day (2009)	Man on the Moon II: The Legend of Mr. Rager (2010)

Deluxe edition cover

Singles from Man on the Moon: The End of Day
- 1. "Day 'n' Nite" Released: February 5, 2008; 2. "Make Her Say" Released: June 9, 2009; 3. "Pursuit of Happiness" Released: January 25, 2010

Man on the Moon: The End of Day is the debut studio album by the American rapper Kid Cudi. It was released on September 15, 2009, through Dream On, GOOD Music, and Universal Motown Records. A concept album narrated by fellow rapper and GOOD Music labelmate Common, it follows the release of his first full-length project A Kid Named Cudi (2008), and is the first installment of the Man on the Moon trilogy. Production was handled by several high-profile record producers, including Kanye West, Emile Haynie, Plain Pat, and Jeff Bhasker, as well as contributions from Dot da Genius, Free School and the Kickdrums, among others.

Man on the Moon: The End of Day spawned three singles—"Day 'n' Nite", "Make Her Say" and "Pursuit of Happiness"—that attained chart success and multiplatinum to diamond-certifications by the Recording Industry Association of America (RIAA). To further promote the album, he toured with Asher Roth and Lady Gaga, respectively. The album received generally positive reviews from critics, who praised its composition and unique approach to the hip-hop genre. Along with being included on several lists for best albums of that year, Man on the Moon: The End of Day received three Grammy Awards nominations.

The album debuted at number four on the Billboard 200, selling 104,000 copies in its first week of release in the United States. It received quadruple platinum certification by the RIAA. Outside of the US, the album was less commercially successful, generally peaking outside of the top 50 positions of album charts. In 2020, Rolling Stone ranked it number 459 on its list of "The 500 Greatest Albums of All Time".

== Background ==
According to AllMusic, soon after it was announced that Kid Cudi would release this album it became "deep in the category of 'much anticipated'". Prior to the album being picked up by the likes of Universal Motown and GOOD Music, he had previously worked with mentor and fellow rapper Kanye West on his 2008 record 808s & Heartbreak, co-writing four hits for it. He said that without those song successes Man on the Moon: The End of Day would not have been picked up by any major labels. Cudi, who became West's protege and collaborator, hoped Man on the Moon: The End of Day would show people that he had his own voice and set him apart. The record was originally titled Man on the Moon: The Guardians, but its subtitle was later changed to The End of Day. Performance artist Andy Kaufman partly inspired the new title. He planned for this record to be the first in a trilogy, with the next edition being entitled The Ghost and the Machine.

Before the success of "Day 'n' Nite", the rapper had said that he would never try to mix politics or jocular things in with his lyrical content. After realizing the power of his voice he then decided to make important and unique songs, focusing on the message, rather than just creating inane music. He said his mode of operation at that time "was just, 'Hey, I'm making these cool sounding songs and I have little messages in them'", but still had himself in it. Although Cudi had a message in every track, he chose to avoid using dense lyrics, explaining that he did not want to write material that he would not actually say or use in real life, adding that being true to yourself entirely was meaningful to him. "I don't speak like a fucking nerdy guy; I speak like a regular dude", he remarked.

He wrote "Day 'n' Nite" after the death of his uncle. The two were not on speaking terms after his uncle forced him out of his home before Cudi could find another living situation. A bitter Cudi never apologized to him before his death, which he now regrets. Other songs on the album expand upon themes discussed in that single. Back in 2007, Drake, who was one of Cudi's first supporters, had shown interest in doing an official remix of the song with him. However, Cudi chose against it since he was not interested in working with people who are in the "same creative realm" as him and because he was in the midst of creating his own works. Beginning in the fourth grade, and getting more tense after his father's death when he was 11, Cudi began dreaming of his own death (which usually was an automobile accident). He channeled these things into his material. Speaking to BlackBook in May 2009, Cudi said of the album and its content:

Each song is a message. All the hooks are stadium-worthy, crowd sing-along, powerful joints that I can't wait for people to hear in stadium magnitude. My album definitely needs to be heard loudly, but it's also a great album if you're smoking and you need to go to sleep. So far I have the lineup of how I want the first seven tracks on my album and if I play the first seven from the beginning to the end, I'm zoned out and it's the best trip ever. You need to be high to appreciate the instrumentation and how everything is put together on the album—but you don't have to be high just to enjoy it in general.

== Recording and production ==
Cudi recorded the album from 2007 to 2009. Man on the Moon: The End of Day was recorded in sessions at Avex Recording Studio in Honolulu, Hawaii, with additional recording at The Broski Room, Chung King in New York City, and the Jim Henson and Record Plant in Hollywood, California. On January 13, 2009, American R&B producer Ryan Leslie posted on his blog that he was in the studio with Cudi and posted a 2-minute video of them working on a song. Later, Cudi spoke to Pitchfork about the production of the album; producers he mentioned that were working on the album include Ratatat, Ryan Leslie, 88-Keys, and The Alchemist. Rap-Up confirmed that he was in the studio with American musicians Travis Barker and will.i.am. Months later, American rapper Pusha T spoke of how he and his brother Malice (of Clipse) had recorded an unreleased song together called "Angels & Demons". On Cudi's official blog, he announced three features for the album, the artists were Kanye West, Common, and Snoop Dogg. News also broke out that MGMT was also set to appear on the album, with Common set to narrate throughout.

In an interview with Joe La Puma from Complex, executive producer Emile Haynie explained the album process and the relationship he had with Cudi prior to the album:

You know what, I heard "Day 'N' Nite" on Cudi's Myspace and was blown away by the record. It didn't even have that many plays on MySpace yet. I don't know how I stumbled across it, but I stumbled across it and heard it. The second I heard it I was like, "Holy shit!" I looked around on his page and saw [Plain] Pat on his top friends list. Me and Pat have had a long relationship, we've always kind of worked together with him being an A&R and me as a producer. So, I hit Pat up and was just like, yo there's this cat with this song that has you as one of his top friends and this song is just like the illest song ever. Obviously he had started to work with Cudi, and was like, "Yeah, yeah that's my guy we should get up." I said bring him by the studio, because I think some of the new beats I got are pretty well-suited for him, we should do some shit.

Later he said:

We didn't get up until a few months after that. I think Pat was doing the Graduation album with Kanye at the time and I was doing this album out in England. Then I think Pat might have hit me up and brought Cudi to the studio. On that first day we cut "Bigger Than You." I remember I was playing them mad beats, and he liked the beats but it was the sort of thing where you're playing an artist mad beats and they're like, yeah that's good, that's good, but you know when somebody really wants something, things get done. The artist hears something and they're like, I'm getting in the booth or I'm writing right now. When you're in the studio that either happens or it doesn't. That wasn't happening and I was just like, fuck it, let's just make something from scratch. And that kinda just sent the tone for how we did everything. The way we did "Bigger Than You," that very first record, it was a sample and we were just listening to records and he was just like, "Yo that's crazy" and we built it up. That's kinda how we did everything from then on.

On the final tracklisting, the guest appearances contained Kanye West, Common, Billy Cravens, Ratatat, MGMT, and Chip tha Ripper. Cudi commented on his Twitter about Cravens that "the world will never know…he wants to keep his identity private…", also gave news that the Clipse and Snoop Dogg records won't be on the album, but will still be made available to fans in some capacity.

== Music and lyrics ==
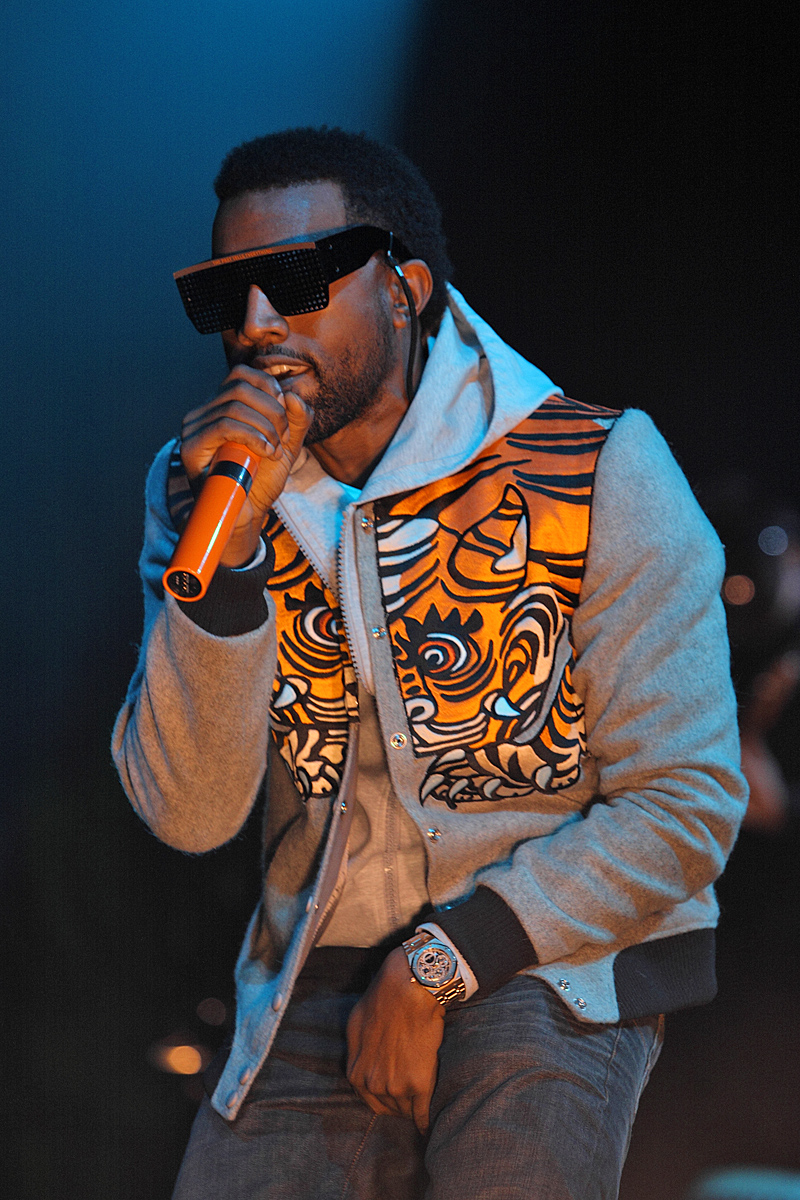
Kanye West executively produced the album, co-wrote two songs and was featured on "Make Her Say".

Man on the Moon: The End of Day has an outer space, futuristic aesthetic akin to 808s & Heartbreak. Primarily a genre-bending album, it has a spacey, atmospheric production that fuses psychedelic, indie pop, rhythm and blues, electronica, and rock styles. The music is typified by synthetic textures, infectious melodies, sparse arrangements, experimental structures, and lush beats. The album's elements contain shuddering keyboards, brooding synths, syncopated drums, sinister strings, and light pianos.

The album received positive comparisons in production to West's 2008 album. Jeff Giles of Pop Dose stated "It's basically a slightly more sonically expansive cousin, only Cudi doesn't have to rely on Auto-Tune shenanigans to get his point across." Aaron Williams of Uproxx said that "The ideas that Kanye gave him the early space to explore on that project ultimately culminated in similar, more fully fleshed-out concepts." HotNewHipHop writer Luke Hinz commented "The abstract nature of his music isn't condescending or isolating; instead, it is deeply personal and genuine in its focus. It is the embodiment of everything that makes him so unique." Cudi's vocals on the album features soulful crooning, off-key singing, humming, baritone vocals, poetic cadence, and an unhurried nasal flow.

Lyrically, Man on the Moon has dark, introspective themes of depression, anxiety, and loneliness. It also touches on family issues, alcoholism, sex, paranoia, and fame. A concept album, Man on the Moon: The End of Day is an autobiographical track series of moody dark material that is separated into five acts that all surround "Day 'n' Nite" with an arcane account. One reviewer summed up the story to be: "[a] lonely guy sits in his room and dreams of success. He uses drugs to calm his fears and fend off night terrors. He eventually gets recognized as the star he always knew he was, and lives the superstar life… or maybe he's still dreaming about that stage of his life, and we're just witnessing what his dreams sound like." According to Cudi, more lively songs had to be added so that listeners did not feel like they were listening to a "slit-your-wrists album". It was observed by a reviewer that on Man on the Moon: The End of Day, Cudi neither raps nor sings, instead he goes "puzzling through some third way: a sort of loose, hazily melodic talking." Musical collaborators included Kanye West, Ratatat and MGMT, among others, and the record is narrated by Common.

The album's first two songs are a one-two introduction to the rapper and what he is up to. There is a gloomy interior monologue about success, the lack of it, and Cudi's inner conflicts, where he welcomes listeners by saying they are in his dreams. "Soundtrack 2 My Life" is the vibrant opening to Cudi's dreamland, as he raps about the work ethic of his mother, the death of his father, and the subsequent depression that came to consume him. It's a prelude of what's to come: the pain, the loss, the feelings of insignificance, and the boundless introspection. His lyrics on the track contain various musical and popular culture references, including those to the song "99 Problems", rapper Jay-Z, mentor Kanye West, the 80s sitcom Charles in Charge, the Pink Floyd album The Dark Side of the Moon, and the movie The Sixth Sense. The third track "Simple As", which is part of the second half of the introduction, has an outer-space style, which is due in part to the Orchestral Manoeuvres in the Dark group sample, and showcases the rapper's readiness to experiment.

Following the opening three-track introduction, there is another three-song section of Man on the Moon: The End of Day where Cudi is confined in his solitary world. Like his current state, the music is appropriately obscure. This chapter of the album is the marijuana section, while in next part the rapper is on psychedelics. References to both drugs are abundant throughout the record, but the latter's part carry "the blind-to-the-world quality of the former." They are internal tracks, where Cudi's mind's state of being is the subject at hand. "Solo Dolo" incorporates a sample of the Menahan Street Band's "The Traitor". Its lyrics are a look into Cudi's darkest nightmares: being alone and unable to escape due to poor decisions. Characterized by eerie strings, it's a vivid, horror-esque examination of a particularly bleak chapter of his life. "My World" features a sample of "All What I Have" by Le Système Crapoutchik, the lyrics deals with his insecurity being overcome by his success and drive to be the man.

"Day 'n' Nite" is the album's turning point, where it transitions from the drab theme of loneliness to vitality. "Sky Might Fall", which is produced by his mentor West, details how Cudi is able to deal with problems and continues on his search for happiness. Among the brighter songs are "Enter Galactic (Love Connection Part 1)", a "trippy disco anthem" that is inspired by when he and a female friend ate shrooms and listened to music by The Postal Service together. "Alive" revolves around how Cudi truly finds himself during the night and seems to turn into a truer version of himself. "Make Her Say" includes a sample of pop singer Lady Gaga's 2009 smash hit "Poker Face" and features verses from West and Common. It takes Gaga's naughty, mischievous central hook and turns it around to be an unrefined oral sex reference that makes it a "hyper-catchy, forward-looking single." He channels André 3000 in "Cudi Zone". "Pursuit of Happiness" is a melancholic return to self-examination from the perspective of an addict looking for their next hit. The happiness of the track is fleeting, confined within the limits of each high; it's a glimpse into a search that seemingly will never come to an end. Cudi understands that the happiness of each addiction is only temporary and ultimately unsatisfactory, yet he can't manage to break free of the cycle that always seems to end in failure. The album's closer is "Up Up and Away", a drug escapist anthem on which Cudi sets his sights on the "happy thoughts" that allow him to fly like Peter Pan. He is "perfectly at peace," and content to "move along a bit higher" in an effort to further elude the troubling thoughts that race through his mind. His realization that people are going to judge him regardless and that he may as well do whatever he pleases is a hopeful conclusion; it also seems to hint that the emotional rollercoaster voyage that he has dreamed of is only beginning. Unlike other music's common theme of drugs being used as an escape from the unpleasant realities, this however, is about breaking free from the rough reality of someone's own mind and heart.

== Promotion ==
=== Singles ===
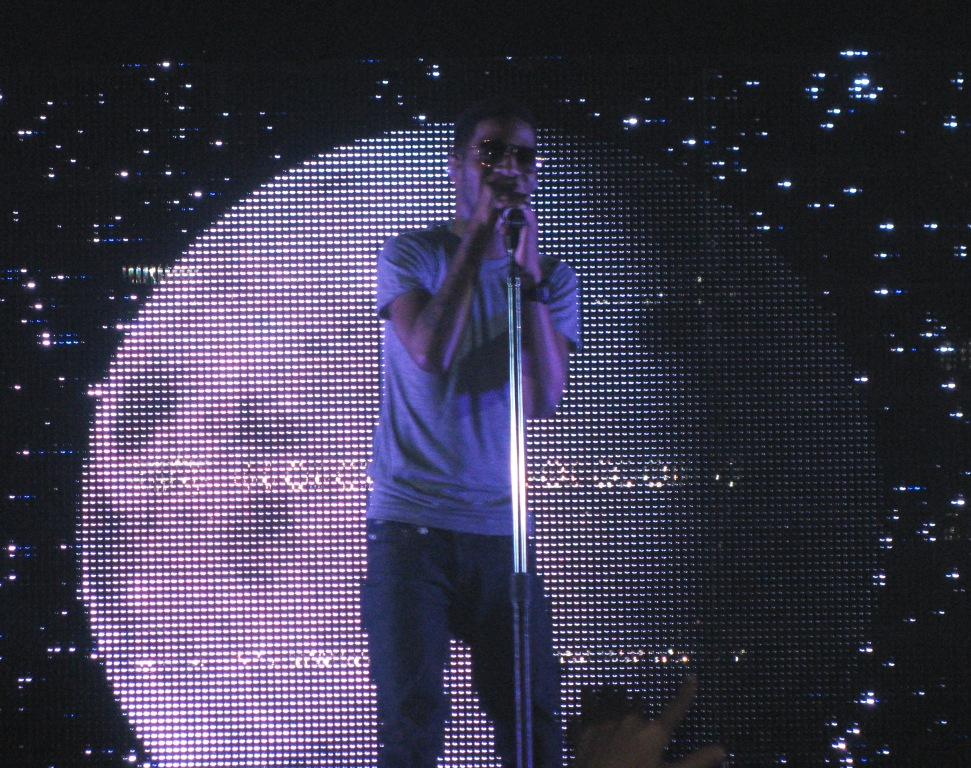
Cudi performing songs from Man on the Moon: The End of Day in August 2009.

The first track from the album to be released as a single was "Day 'n' Nite" which was a commercial success, when it debuted at number 88 and peaked at number five on the US Billboard Hot 100, becoming Cudi's highest charting song on that chart. Reaching its highest peak at number two on both the United Kingdom and Belgium charts, "Day 'n' Nite" also found its peak positions within the top ten on the French singles charts, as well as charting in the top twenty positions on Irish, German and Australian charts. It was certified platinum by the Recording Industry Association of America (RIAA) for paid digital downloads of more than one million copies in the United States in July 2009. Although Cudi was grateful for the opportunity to make a video for "Day 'n' Nite" and enjoyed the overall concept for it, he was disappointed that a majority of his ideas were ignored and cut out of the video. When he saw the video for the first time, he claims he provided feedback for it, but was ignored. The rapper than decided to make another video for the track, which was directed by French artist and director So Me.

Despite Cudi announcing plans to release "Sky Might Fall", as Man on the Moon: The End of Day's second single, "Make Her Say" was instead chosen. Compared to its previous single, "Make Her Say" was less successful on the music charts, with its highest peak position being at number 18 on the Belgium Singles Chart. The music video for the track was directed by Nez Khammal and utilizes a split screen effect to create the illusion that the three artists (Cudi, Kanye West and Common) were all filmed in the same location. In reality, they had shot their individual scenes on opposite coasts of the United States; Common and Cudi were filmed in New York City while West was filmed in Los Angeles. The third and last single to be released from Man on the Moon: The End of Day was "Pursuit of Happiness" on January 25, 2010. "Pursuit of Happiness" managed to chart at number 59 on the Billboard Hot 100, with its highest peak position being at number 41 on the Australian Singles Chart.

=== Touring ===
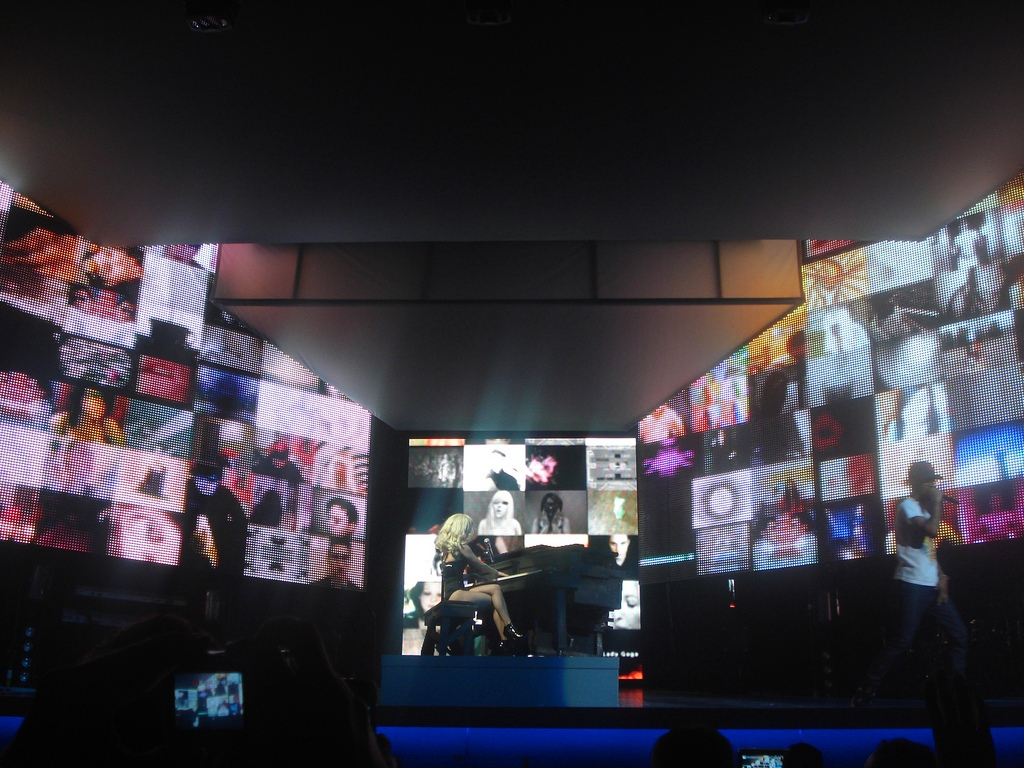
Cudi (right) performing with Gaga (center) on her The Monster Ball Tour in November 2009.

Initially Cudi stated that he would "lay low until his album drops to avoid unnecessary hype." Despite this statement, he went on a tour with rapper Asher Roth between July and August 2009. He performed all of the album's singles at Maryland's The Ulalume Music Festival in October 2009. In 2009, the rapper also toured with singer Lady Gaga as an opening act during the first leg of her The Monster Ball Tour in North America, where he performed the track "Make Her Say". Less than a month later, and after an altercation with an audience member in Vancouver, it was announced that due to time conflicts, Cudi chose to leave the tour. An official statement from him read, "Kid Cudi has decided to take an early leave of absence from Lady Gaga's Monster Ball tour, in order to balance his schedule surrounding the recording of his next album and acting commitments. Cudi does not want to disappoint his fans and will move forward with his individual show dates in December and throughout the month of January." However, in Complex's October / November issue the rapper claimed that he was kicked off of the tour, commenting "she's going to kick me off the tour because she didn't want that type of negative energy at her shows? Word? I never did nothing to that girl".

== Critical reception ==
Man on the Moon: The End of Day ratings
Aggregate scores
Source	Rating
AnyDecentMusic?	6.5/10
Metacritic	71/100
Review scores
Source	Rating
AllMusic	4/5 stars
The A.V. Club	B
Chicago Tribune	3.5/4 stars
Entertainment Weekly	A−
Los Angeles Times	3/4 stars
Pitchfork	4.1/10
PopMatters	7/10
Q	4/5 stars
Rolling Stone	3/5 stars
Slant Magazine	3/5 stars

Man on the Moon: The End of Day was met with generally positive reviews. At Metacritic, which assigns a normalized rating out of 100 to reviews from professional publications, the album received an average score of 71, based on 15 reviews. Aggregator AnyDecentMusic? gave it 6.5 out of 10, based on their assessment of the critical consensus.

The Boston Globe praised the experimental quality of the album: "It's spacey, adventurous, and ridiculously intriguing if only because it's so different". Complimenting Cudi's "introspective persona, ear for melody, and eclectic taste in beats," Entertainment Weekly music reviewer Simon Vozick-Levinson called him "a hyped upstart who really does represent a promising new phase in the genre's evolution." David Jeffries of AllMusic called it "a soul searcher [that] may require more patience than your everyday debut", but "perfects the futuristic bleak-beat hip-hop Kanye purposed a year earlier, and rewards the listener with every tripped-out return." Greg Kot, writing in the Chicago Tribune, believed that the album had the potential to turn heads as well as "bum-rush the charts." Slant Magazine's Paul Schrodt wrote that the album attempts to be "both a bigger pop platform and indie credibility", and felt that Cudi's verses "are too good to ignore" so long as the listener does not take them too seriously. Ann Power of the Los Angeles Times called Man on the Moon a "standout release" in spite of "Cudi's voice". Billboard magazine's Michael Menachem said that the album is "anything but a traditional hip-hop recording" and that Cudi's "delivery is confident in a poetic and artful way". David Bevan of The A.V. Club said that, despite its filler, Cudi's "thick layer of open, intense self-loathing is a clever way of unifying Man on the Moon as pure mood piece, a stream-of-consciousness pop voyage that's more Phil Collins than rap."

In a mixed review, Jody Rosen of Rolling Stone was impressed by its music, but found Cudi's raps "pedestrian". Ian Cohen of Pitchfork gave the album a negative review, finding it frustrating that the album felt like a failed opportunity rather than a "non-starter". He further wrote that Cudi largely smears his verses with a "flat warble" that is salvaged by Auto-Tune, which he remarked would be "numbing enough on its own" had it not been for the frequent "terrifyingly underwritten lyric to jolt you into sharp pangs of embarrassment." In a largely mixed review, Jon Caramanica of The New York Times expressed his astonishment at the emotional honesty embedded into Cudi's songwriting but felt his restrained vocal performance diminished his presence on the album, writing, that the album "is a colossal, and mystifying, missed opportunity, misguided if it is in fact guided at all." Citing the tracks "Solo Dolo" and on "Cudi Zone" as Cudi's most "appealingly creepy" and intricate vocal performance, on his general view of the album, Caramanica wrote that the rest of the album lacks that liveliness and drive, reducing Cudi to a "gaseous nonentity".

=== Accolades ===
Man on the Moon: The End of Day was named Entertainment Weekly's Best Hip Hop Album of 2009 and called one of the year's best debut albums. Due to his "key track", "Day 'n' Nite", Cudi was also one of their five breakout stars of the year. Calling it a "wonderfully weird album", MTV's James Montgomery listed Man on the Moon: The End of Day as being the nineteenth of twenty best albums of 2009. Montgomery wrote that the album's collaborations, Commons narration of it and its detailed storytelling as some of the reasons for its inclusion on his list. The album was also Complex's Best Album of 2009. Prior to its official release as a single, "Pursuit of Happiness" was listed as being number 15 on Montgomery's list of "Best Songs of 2009", and "Day 'n' Nite" was ranked in at number 15 on the list of "Best 25 Songs of 2009" by Rolling Stone. Two singles from Man on the Moon: The End of Day were nominated for awards at the 2010 Grammy Awards. "Day 'n' Nite" was nominated for Best Rap Song and Best Rap Solo Performance, while "Make Her Say" was also nominated for Best Rap Performance by a Duo or Group category. The lead single was also nominated for two BET Hip Hop Awards and one Urban Music Award. The "Crookers Remix" of "Day 'n' Night" earned Cudi his first and only Beatport Music Award. In October 2013, Complex named it the fifth best hip hop album of the last five years. In 2020, Rolling Stone ranked Man on the Moon: The End of Day as the 459th album on their "500 Greatest Albums of All Time".

== Commercial performance ==
In the week ending on September 23, 2009, Man on the Moon: The End of Day debuted at number four on the US Billboard 200, selling 104,000 copies in its first week of release, charting behind Jay-Z's The Blueprint 3, Whitney Houston's I Look to You and Muse's The Resistance. On the 2009 year-end chart for Billboard 200, the album was listed at number 157. It failed to rise above its positions on those charts and would later be outperformed by his next studio album, Man on the Moon II: The Legend of Mr. Rager (2010). Man on the Moon: The End of Day also peaked on the US Top R&B/Hip-Hop Albums top ten positions.

In the French Album Charts, Man on the Moon: The End of Day debuted at number 56, and again did not rise above this position. After charting on the chart for five consecutive weeks, it fell out of the top two-hundred positions by October 2009. The album also found its peak at number 56 again on the Swiss Album Charts. In Australia, on the week commencing September 28, 2009, the album reached its peak of 85 on the ARIA Charts. As of April 22, 2016, the album has sold 860,000 copies in the United States. On December 15, 2022, Man on the Moon: The End of Day was certified four-times platinum by the Recording Industry Association of America (RIAA) for combined sales, streaming and track-sales equivalent of four million units.

== Legacy and influence ==
Man on the Moon: The End of Day's influence continues to be felt both in hip hop and in pop culture. Numerous publications have cited Man on the Moon: The End of Day as having a significant influence on subsequent hip hop music, and has been described as a "classic". Travis Scott, Kyle, Logic, Isaiah Rashad, Raury and Lil Yachty have all cited Kid Cudi and the album as influential to their music. Travis Scott's 2013 mixtape Owl Pharaoh has been compared to Man on the Moon: The End of Day and considered to have been stylistically influenced by the album.

== Track listing ==
Act I: The End of Day
No.	Title	Writer(s)	Producer(s)	Length
1.	"In My Dreams (Cudder Anthem)"	Scott Mescudi; Emile Haynie	Haynie	3:19
2.	"Soundtrack 2 My Life"	Mescudi	Haynie	3:56
3.	"Simple As..."	Mescudi; Patrick Reynolds; Andy McCluskey; Paul Humphreys	Plain Pat	2:31

Act II: Rise of the Night Terrors
No.	Title	Writer(s)	Producer(s)	Length
4.	"Solo Dolo (Nightmare)"	Mescudi; Thomas Brenneck; Dave Guy; Leon Michels	Haynie	4:26
5.	"Heart of a Lion (Kid Cudi Theme Music)"	Mescudi; Jean Baptiste; Michael McHenry	Free School	4:21
6.	"My World" (featuring Billy Cravens)	Mescudi; Reynolds; Jeff Bhasker; Claude Puterflam; Christian Padovan; Gerard Kawczynski	Plain Pat; Bhasker	4:03

Act III: Taking a Trip
No.	Title	Writer(s)	Producer(s)	Length
7.	"Day 'n' Nite (Nightmare)"	Mescudi; Oladipo Omishore	Dot da Genius; Kid Cudi^{[a]}	3:41
8.	"Sky Might Fall"	Mescudi; Kanye West	West; Kid Cudi^{[a]}	3:41
9.	"Enter Galactic (Love Connection Part I)"	Mescudi; Matt Friedman	Friedman	4:20

Act IV: Stuck
No.	Title	Writer(s)	Producer(s)	Length
10.	"Alive (Nightmare)" (featuring Ratatat)	Mescudi; Evan Mast; Mike Stroud	Ratatat	4:07
11.	"Cudi Zone"	Mescudi; Haynie	Haynie	4:19
12.	"Make Her Say" (featuring Kanye West and Common)	Mescudi; West; Lonnie Lynn; Stefani Germanotta; Nadir Khayat; Rasheed Faheem; Nathan Walker; Breyon Prescott; Christopher Henderson; Brandon Melancon; James Brown; John Conte, Jr.; Terius Nash; Jamie Foxx	West	3:36
13.	"Pursuit of Happiness (Nightmare)" (featuring MGMT and Ratatat)	Mescudi; Mast; Stroud	Ratatat	4:55

Act V: A New Beginning
No.	Title	Writer(s)	Producer(s)	Length
14.	"Hyyerr" (featuring Chip tha Ripper)	Mescudi; Christian Kalla; Charles Worth; Kenneth Gamble; Leon Huff	Crada	3:32
15.	"Up Up & Away"	Mescudi; Baptiste; Michael McHenry; Alain Whyte	Free School	3:47
Total length:				58:29

Deluxe edition (bonus tracks)
No.	Title	Writer(s)	Producer	Length
16.	"Man on the Moon (The Anthem)"	Mescudi; Nosaj Thing	Haynie	3:27
17.	"T.G.I.F." (featuring Chip tha Ripper)	Mescudi; Worth; Alex Fitts; Matt Pentilla	The Kickdrums	2:23
18.	"Is There Any Love?" (featuring Wale)	Mescudi; Haynie; Trevor Dandy; Mark Hasselbach; Paul Zaza; Olubowale Akintimehin	Haynie	3:31

United Kingdom bonus track
No.	Title	Writer(s)	Producer(s)	Length
16.	"Day 'n' Nite" (Crookers Remix)	Mescudi; Omishore	Dot da Genius; Kid Cudi^{[a]}	4:41

Notes

- ^{^[a]} signifies a co-producer
- "In My Dreams (Cudder Anthem)", "Simple As...", "Enter Galactic (Love Connection Part I)" and "Up Up & Away" feature narration by Common
- "Heart of a Lion (Kid Cudi Theme Music)" features background vocals by Jeff Bhasker
- "Day 'n' Nite (Nightmare)" features background vocals by L.E.X.; and on iTunes the song is only titled as "Day 'n' Nite"

Sample credits

- "In My Dreams (Cudder Anthem)" contains a sample of "Biceps", performed by Garnegy and Maties.
- "Simple As..." contains a sample of "ABC (Auto-Industry)", performed by Orchestral Manoeuvres in the Dark.
- "Solo Dolo (Nightmare)" contains a sample of "The Traitor", performed by the Menahan Street Band.
- "Heart of a Lion (Kid Cudi Theme Music)" contains an interpolation of "You Make Me Feel Brand New", performed by The Stylistics.
- "My World" contains a sample of "All What I Have", performed by Le Système Crapoutchik.
- "Make Her Say" contains an interpolation of "Poker Face" (Piano & Voice Version), performed by Lady Gaga; and contains a sample of "Let's Ride", performed by Q-Tip.
- "Hyyerr" contains a sample of "Early Morning Love", performed by Lou Rawls.
- "Man on the Moon (The Anthem)" contains a sample of "Aquarium", performed by Nosaj Thing.

== Personnel ==
Credits for Man on the Moon: The End of Day adapted from AllMusic.

- Jeff Bhasker – keyboards, producer, background vocals
- Common – narrator
- Andrew Dawson – engineer
- Matthew Friedman – producer
- Dot da Genius – engineer, mixing, producer
- Larry Gold – conductor, string arrangements, strings
- Ben Goldwasser – vocals
- Emile Haynie – engineer, executive producer, producer
- Kid Cudi – executive producer, producer
- Anthony Kilhoffer – engineer
- L.E.X. – vocals
- Erik Madrid – assistant
- Manny Marroquin – mixing
- Vlado Meller – mastering
- The Larry Gold Orchestra – strings
- Anthony Palazzole – assistant
- Christian Plata – assistant
- Ratatat – engineer, producer
- Patrick "Plain Pat" Reynolds – executive producer, producer
- Sylvia Rhone – executive producer
- Scott Sandler – art direction, design
- Bill Sienkiewicz – illustrations
- Andrew VanWyngarden – vocals
- Kanye West – executive producer, producer
- Crada – producer
- Ryan West – engineer
- Alain Whyte – guitar

== Charts ==
=== Weekly charts ===
Chart performance for Man on the Moon: The End of Day
Chart (2009–2016)	Peak position
Australian Albums (ARIA)	85
Canadian Albums (Billboard)	11
French Albums (SNEP)	56
German Albums (Offizielle Top 100)	90
Swiss Albums (Schweizer Hitparade)	56
UK R&B Albums (Official Charts)	15
US Billboard 200	4
US Top R&B/Hip-Hop Albums (Billboard)	5

=== Year-end charts ===
2009 year-end chart performance for Man on the Moon: The End of Day
Chart (2009)	Position
US Billboard 200	157
US Top R&B/Hip-Hop Albums (Billboard)	74

2010 year-end chart performance for Man on the Moon: The End of Day
Chart (2010)	Position
US Billboard 200	127
US Top R&B/Hip-Hop Albums (Billboard)	33

2011 year-end chart performance for Man on the Moon: The End of Day
Chart (2011)	Position
US Top R&B/Hip-Hop Albums (Billboard)	70

2020 year-end chart performance for Man on the Moon: The End of Day
Chart (2020)	Position
US Billboard 200	186

2021 year-end chart performance for Man on the Moon: The End of Day
Chart (2021)	Position
US Billboard 200	106

2022 year-end chart performance for Man on the Moon: The End of Day
Chart (2022)	Position
US Billboard 200	90
US Top R&B/Hip-Hop Albums (Billboard)	76

2023 year-end chart performance for Man on the Moon: The End of Day
Chart (2023)	Position
US Billboard 200	143

== Certifications ==
Certifications for Man on the Moon: The End of Day
Region	Certification	Certified units/sales
Denmark (IFPI Danmark)	Gold	10,000^{‡}
United Kingdom (BPI)	Gold	100,000^{‡}
United States (RIAA)	4× Platinum	4,000,000^{‡}
^{‡} Sales+streaming figures based on certification alone.
