= Plain Pat =

American songwriter

- Born: Patrick Reynolds
- Origin: United States
- Genre: Hip hop
- Occupations: Talent manager; record producer; songwriter; record executive; disc jockey
- Years active: 2001–present
- Label: Dream On (former)

Patrick Reynolds, known professionally as Plain Pat, is an American record producer, talent manager, record executive and disc jockey (DJ). He is perhaps best known for his work with American rapper Kid Cudi, having been credited on eight of his ten studio albums. His other credits include Drake, Kanye West, Alicia Keys, Mary J. Blige, Lupe Fiasco, Ghostface Killah, The Roots, Lloyd, Young Gunz, Ashanti, Ludacris, Freeway, Ja Rule, N.O.R.E. and the Mutton Birds, among others.

Plain Pat has co-produced several commercially successful albums. He has been credited on Thank Me Later, Element of Freedom, Stronger with Each Tear, 808's and Heartbreak, Man on the Moon II: The Legend of Mr. Rager, Man on the Moon: The End of Day, A Kid Named Cudi, Graduation, and The Life of Pablo, among others. Furthermore, he has served as A&R on the following: More Fish, Game Theory, Fishscale, The College Dropout, Southside, Tough Luv, Fefe Dobson, Ashanti's Christmas, Chicken-N-Beer, Chapter II, Philadelphia Freeway, Last Temptation, God's Favorite, Tical 0: The Prequel and Flock: The Best of the Mutton Birds.

== Career and ventures ==
In 2007, Plain Pat mixed and hosted Kanye West's mixtape Can't Tell Me Nothing. In 2007, Pat, alongside fellow American music producer Emile Haynie, began co-managing up-and-coming musician Kid Cudi. In 2008, Plain Pat and Haynie produced Kid Cudi’s breakout mixtape A Kid Named Cudi. In 2009, Plain Pat, Haynie and Cudi, launched their record label imprint, Dream On, in partnership with Kanye West's GOOD Music and Universal Motown. Cudi announced in February 2011 however, that the label had been dissolved. Cudi stated to Complex magazine that they were still on good terms: "I wanted to try something new, and I wanted to take control of things myself.[...] There’s no hard feelings." The label released Kid Cudi's albums, Man on the Moon: The End of Day (2009) and Man on the Moon II: The Legend of Mr. Rager (2010). In 2010, Plain Pat also worked on My Beautiful Dark Twisted Fantasy with Kanye West. In 2015, Plain Pat and Kid Cudi reunited with Speedin' Bullet 2 Heaven. Plain Pat also contributed to Kanye West's The Life of Pablo in 2016, as well as the Kid Cudi and Kanye West collaborative project Kids See Ghosts in 2018.

== Legacy ==
In a 2021 interview, American producer Dot da Genius spoke on Plain Pat: “I just have to go on record and say Plain Pat is a very elusive, mythical figure in our industry. He's done so many legendary things and his taste level... You want to get Plain Pat to like your music, because then you know you got something.”

In February 2022, Kanye West posted a photo of Plain Pat on his Instagram, and captioned it: "Even though we didn’t see this person in the doc Plain Pat is one the most important people in my career. He was the first person who worked at Def Jam who not only saw my potential but invested his time to ensure our success. He also discovered Kid Cudi and he invented drums like Swagger like us and the game changing bleep snare on Say You Will. This person has never lied to me and is the least industry person I know. He has never clouted up. If you can count your real friends on one hand I only have 4 fingers left."

== Discography ==
=== Soundtrack albums ===
List of soundtracks, with selected information
Title	Album details
Entergalactic (Original Score) (with Dot da Genius)	Released: October 14, 2022; Label: Netflix Music, LLC; Formats: CD, digital download

== Filmography ==
- A Man Named Scott (2021) - Himself

== Awards and nominations ==
=== Black Reel Television Awards ===
Year	Nominated work	Award	Result
2023	Entergalactic	Outstanding Musical Score	Nominated
