= Dot da Genius =

American record producer and audio engineer

- Born: Oladipo Omishore; July 17, 1986 (age 39); New York City, New York, U.S.
- Origin: Brooklyn, New York, U.S.
- Genres: Hip hop; alternative rock
- Occupations: Record producer; audio engineer; disc jockey
- Years active: 2001–present
- Labels: Wicked Awesome; GOOD; Universal Republic; HeadBanga
- Member of: WZRD
- Spouse: Jhené Aiko (m. 2014; div. 2017)

Oladipo Omishore (born July 17, 1986), known professionally as Dot da Genius, is an American record producer and audio engineer. He first gained recognition for his production on Kid Cudi's 2008 single "Day 'n' Nite"; the two would later form the rock band WZRD in 2010.

In entrepreneurial pursuits, Omishore has launched the multi-media company HeadBanga Muzik Group. Outside of his work with Cudi, he has worked with prominent music industry artists, including Nas, Kanye West, Eminem, Denzel Curry, Lil Nas X, JID, 6LACK, and Jhené Aiko, among others.

== Life and career ==
=== 1986–2005: Early life ===
Omishore is from the Brooklyn borough of New York City. He is of Nigerian heritage, of the Yoruba tribe. His parents always encouraged his interest in music, and at the age of seven, his father sent him to the Brooklyn Music School for piano lessons, where he studied with Tom Coote. Omishore preferred playing the guitar, but learning how to play a keyboard instrument was very beneficial later in life when he started producing. He attended Polytechnic Institute of New York University in New York, where he studied electrical engineering, was a member of the university basketball team, and graduated in 2008.

=== 2006–2009: Career beginnings and producing for Kid Cudi ===
Omishore began his career in sound-mixing in 2003 at New York University by using Image-Line's FL Studio program. In 2004, Omishore created a studio in his basement with equipment bought by his parents and would later call it "Head Banga Muzik Studios." After gaining attention for his production, he decided to change locations to the Brewery Recording Studio. In May 2009, Omishore partnered up with Andrew Krivonos, owner of Brewery Recording Studio, and helped move the studio to North Brooklyn in a new facility.

Omishore and Kid Cudi met in 2006, and they lived together for two years. Both artists found a genuine liking for one another, and chose to work with each other on several music productions. "Day N' Nite" turned out to be the biggest hit production that both of them worked on together, with Omishore providing the beats and Cudi rapping and singing over the music. He produced the song in Head Banga Muzik Studios, and used several different methods of mixing and synthesizing the beats on this track. The song took a total of two days to complete, from the instrumental being made to the track's final arrangements. No edits were made after that two-day process ended. It was finished in 2007 and became popular two years later, in 2009. "Day N' Nite" reached the top three in the United States and the United Kingdom. It was released under the labels GOOD Music, Fool's Gold Records, Universal Motown Records, and Data Records. It is featured on the album Man on the Moon: The End of Day.

=== 2010–2018: WZRD ===
WZRD is Omishore and Kid Cudi's collaboration alternative rock band. Kid Cudi focuses on the vocals, while Omishore is responsible for the production. Their self-titled album was later released in February 2012. Together, they produced a self-made album titled WZRD. Much of their inspiration behind the album came from their love for Nirvana, The Pixies, and Pink Floyd. They recorded much of the album in either their tour bus while they were on the road, or Cudi's basement studio in Hollywood Hills. This album contained absolutely no profanity, including the "n word" that many rappers loosely use. The album was first released on February 28, 2012. It reportedly sold 70,499 copies in its opening week. Although Cudi finds the marketing and promotion of the album weak by Universal Music Group, it landed the number three spot on the album sales chart. Universal Music Group also allegedly under-shipped copies of the album. While "Rocket" was released prior to the release of WZRD, it was not featured on the album.

=== 2018–present: Solo debut album ===
In 2018, Omishore and Woodro Skillson announced the signing of James Japan to their label, HeadBanga Muzik Group.

In 2019, Omishore co-produced the hit single Panini by Lil Nas X along with producer duo Take A Daytrip. The single peaked at number 5 on the Billboard Hot 100.

In 2020, Omishore scored his first number-one hit single on the Billboard Hot 100, when "The Scotts," a collaborative effort between Cudi and his protege Travis Scott, debuted at the top spot in the US chart.

On June 24, 2022, Omishore released "Talk About Me", the lead single from his upcoming solo debut album. The song features vocals from American rappers Kid Cudi, Denzel Curry, and JID. In July 2022, Complex interviewed Omishore on his upcoming debut album.

== Artistry ==
Omishore is a self-taught music producer and engineer.

Among Omishore’s favorite albums of all time are Pink Floyd's The Dark Side of the Moon, Dr. Dre's The Chronic, Outkast's ATLiens, and Coldplay's Viva la Vida or Death and All His Friends.

== Personal life ==
Omishore has one daughter, from a previous relationship. In September 2014, American singer-songwriter Jhené Aiko, revealed she and Omishore were in a relationship. The two revealed their marriage in March 2016. On August 9, 2016, Jhené Aiko filed for divorce citing irreconcilable differences. The divorce was finalized in October 2017.

== Discography ==
=== Soundtrack albums ===
List of soundtracks, with selected information
Title	Album details
Entergalactic (Original Score) (with Plain Pat)	Released: October 14, 2022; Label: Netflix Music; Formats: CD, digital download

=== Singles ===
List of singles as lead artist, with selected chart positions, showing year released and album name
Title	Year	Album
"Fettuccine" (featuring Tunji Ige, Fat Tony and Price)	2018	Non-album singles
"Talk About Me" (with Kid Cudi, Denzel Curry and JID)	2022	Non-album singles

=== Guest appearances ===
List of non-single guest appearances, with other performing artists, showing year released and album name
Title	Year	Other artist(s)	Album
"Burrow"	2022	Kid Cudi, Don Toliver, Steve Aoki	Entergalactic

== Awards and nominations ==
=== BET Hip Hop Awards ===
Year	Nominated work	Award	Result
2009	Day 'n' Nite	BET Hip Hop Award for Track of the Year	Nominated
2009	Day 'n' Nite	BET Hip Hop Award for Best Hip Hop Video	Nominated

=== Black Reel Television Awards ===
Year	Nominated work	Award	Result
2023	Entergalactic	Outstanding Musical Score	Nominated

=== Grammy Awards ===
Year	Nominated work	Award	Result
2010	"Day 'n' Nite"	Grammy Award for Best Rap Solo Performance	Nominated
2010	"Day 'n' Nite"	Grammy Award for Best Rap Song	Nominated
2019	“Panini”	Best Rap/Sung Performance	Nominated

=== MTV Video Music Awards ===
Year	Nominated work	Award	Result
2009	"Day 'n' Nite"	MTV Video Music Award for Best New Artist	Nominated

=== mtvU Woodie Awards ===
Year	Nominated work	Award	Result
2009	"Day 'n' Nite	Best Video Woodie	Nominated

== Filmography ==
- A Man Named Scott (2021) - Himself
- 1992 (2024) - Himself - Executive producer
