= Mr. Rager =

Single by Kid Cudi

from the album Man on the Moon II: The Legend of Mr. Rager
- Released: October 25, 2010
- Recorded: 2010
- Genre: Art pop
- Length: 4:56 (original); 6:41 (Prime Day Show version)
- Label: GOOD Music; Universal Motown
- Songwriters: Scott Mescudi; Emile Haynie; Timmy Thomas
- Producers: Emile; Jeff Bhasker; No I.D.

Kid Cudi singles chronology
"Erase Me" (2010)	"Mr. Rager" (2010)	"All of the Lights" (2010)

Music video
- "Mr. Rager" on YouTube

"Mr. Rager" is a song recorded by American rapper Kid Cudi, taken from his second studio album, Man on the Moon II: The Legend of Mr. Rager (2010). The song was officially released via digital download, on October 25, 2010, as the album's second single. The semi-autobiographical lyrics were written by Cudi, while the composition was written by his frequent collaborator, Emile Haynie, who also served as the song's producer. It is one of Cudi’s biggest songs.

In 2021, Kid Cudi released an alternate version of the song, which originally premiered on Amazon's Prime Day Show. The alternate version was included on an extended play (EP) titled Prime Day Show x Kid Cudi, issued exclusively on Amazon Music, on June 17, 2021. The original song was later included on Cudi's first greatest hits album The Boy Who Flew to the Moon, Vol. 1 (2022).

== Background ==
Cudi took his persona of playing the part of a brooding loner several steps forward on his second studio album Man on the Moon II: The Legend of Mr. Rager (2010). His second effort contains a five-part narrative following a character who attempts to act like the hip-hop star he has since become. Hence, he plunges into a world of bravado and after-parties, with their never-ending supply of drugs and women. In an interview with Complex magazine, Cudi shed light on the title track's meaning. He explained "Mr. Rager" is about being tired with reality and looking for thrills and excitement by any means. Cudi said, "It's just kind of how I was feeling at that point. I was just so angry. Doing coke revived me, and knowing I was so close to death every time intrigued me. I liked the thought of it." On October 20, 2010, Complex released a video, filmed while they were shooting Cudi's cover story, on where Cudi continued explaining the concept of "Mr. Rager". He elaborated, "The whole 'Mr. Rager' thing is not really like a split personality, it is i. However, it's just kinda talking about a certain mind state I was in, a very destructive mind state, where I wasn't thinking clearly.

Kid Cudi
(@KidCudi)
tweeted:

Mr Rager was about almost overdosing one time. "When will the fantasy end"? (Life) "When will the heaven begin?" (Death)

October 9, 2013

"Mr. Rager" is a song with a meaning that is close to Kid Cudi. His character embodies a battle between instinct and impulse, both good and bad, still coming to terms with. The song's lyrics are about Cudi's battle with drugs, with lines referencing about almost overdosing one time. Cudi acknowledged using cocaine during a Converse show back in July 2010, said he was going to be around until he was "old as fuck" and apologized to his fans for letting them down. Cudi said, "Every time I snap. I'm sitting there making songs like 'Heart of a Lion' and talking about getting through anything, and rising up, and I'm up here snapping and letting people break my shell. I have to practice what I preach. I get strength, and the kids use it." Cudi conceded that death was a recurring theme for him. He imparted, "...but I'm at a different point in my life, and I don't even like talking about that. I've been thinking positive and keeping my mind out of the clouds. You can't take things so seriously, but I gambled for a long time. Shit was intense, it was a journey."

The concept of Mr. Rager was again revisited on Cudi's seventh album, Man on the Moon III: The Chosen (2020). In 2022, it was used as a plot point in his animated Entergalactic feature film; as a result, the character is referenced in its accompanying album as well.

== Recording ==
The recording sessions for "Mr. Rager" took place at Nightbird Studios at The Sunset Marquis, California and Avex Studios in Honolulu, Hawaii. The track was mixed at Larrabee Studios in Los Angeles, California. The song as well as its studio album, Man on the Moon II: The Legend of Mr. Rager musically and thematically expands on what Cudi had previously built, but with a closer look into his life. The record experiments with crossover music, boasting flashes of rock guitars alongside marching production. Alongside guitar, the track features low bass, electro flourishes and ticking percussion. Regarding the song, Cudi stated, [The track] is very important to me… it made me switch the whole theme on my album. It was time to show off another side of me — a side that's more aggressive." Both the writing and recording of "Mr. Rager" was influenced by Cudi's former addiction to cocaine. He made his first attempted to record the title track around 2010. However, he could not hit the high notes. so he decide to quit and try the song again months later.

== Composition ==
"Mr. Rager" is an arena anthem tinged with rock guitars that runs for four minutes and fifty-six seconds. The lyrics were written by Cudi while the music was written by Emile Haynie. The ghostly, hypnotic musical arrangement is driven by a teasing, descending guitar riff. An epic slow-jam, it has a glimmery, ticking background underscored with low bass and guitar. They are anthemic in nature, with Cudi intoning lines in a sing-a-long manner. The track features a repeated hook, with Cudi wailing: "Mr. Raaggggeeerrrrrrrrrrrr."

The song's lyrics address death, escapism and the quest for excitement. "Mr. Rager" acts a dark, foreboding theme song in which Cudi imagines himself an anti-heroic role model telling kids about his adventures. From the perspective of his errant title character, he softly about envy of the birds just "singin', flyin' around." Mr. Rager is a tall imposing figure who, upon being released from worldly restrictions, sets off on a cryptic journey. Upon asking their enigmatic anti-hero: "Mr. Rager, tell me some of your stories," a warped voice mysteriously replies, "I'm off on an adventure," to which Cudi pleads, "Can we tag along?" Cudi sings to himself, pleading, "Tell me where you're going…when will the fantasy end?" His lyrics ambivalently allude to rapture and death, singing, "I'm on my way to heaven."

== Critical reception ==
Rolling Stone writers Steve Appleford, Matt Diehl and Gavin Edwards called the song an "infectious hit" and found it emotional. Simon Vozick-Levinson for Entertainment Weekly cites "Mr. Rager" as one of the best songs from Man on the Moon II. He commented, "Eight-minute epic Mr. Rager, his spooky theme song." Within the album's context, Spin's Charles Aaron remarked, "'Mr. Rager,' a would-be arena anthem with a teasing guitar riff that never ascends, is the ingenious anticlimax." William Goodman, from the same publication, claimed that "the dark soul jam featured sinister electro flourishes, clacking percussion, and a repeated hook about partying too much — 'Mr. Raaggggeeerrrrrrrrrrrr' — that could find its way into the heads of rap fans worldwide." Jon Pareles from The New York Times likened the song's "ticking, tinkly foreboding" background to "Money" by Pink Floyd. Chicago Tribune critic Greg Kot stated, "The music struts (and flirts with crossover acceptance, ala OutKast or Kanye West)."

Respect. claimed that Cudi brought on a classic with "Mr. Rager." Robby Seabrook of XXL considered "Mr. Rager" one of the tracks from Man on the Moon II which are key to his career. He praised the song for its "sing-a-long factor and embodiment of Cudi's ethos." Ian Servantes of The Red Bull Music Academy deemed "Mr. Rager" Cudi's second best song. He stated, "Mr. Rager is an alter ego just as necessary for Scott Mescudi as he is for us. Unbound by earthly shackles, he's off on a journey cryptic enough for anyone to project their own destination. ... It's an intoxicating message, an inspiring decree, made only more enticing by the march of Emile's production." Andy Bustard from The Boombox described the song as the parent album's "glimmering and wondrous centerpiece." He stated, "'Mr. Rager' is naturally a Kid Cudi song that resonates deeply with a lot of people. Just take the story of Ben Breedlove, a teenager diagnosed with a severe heart condition who had a vision of hearing 'Mr. Rager' and meeting Kid Cudi, who he believed was his angel. That right there epitomizes the impact Scott Mescudi, and this song, has on peoples' lives." Calling the song "strangely hypnotic," Billboard's Jason Lipshutz regards "Mr. Rager" as one song from Cudi's interim period that deserved more attention than it received.

== Music video ==
Kid Cudi first spoke of the music video on March 5, 2011, via his Twitter feed, when he announced: "[the] maniac horror short will be released on halloween, rager short this summer, marijuana video this spring. I got you guys, no worries."

The music video for "Mr. Rager" was directed by Jeremie Rozan of Surface to Air Studios. Rozan had been behind the EMA-winning video for Justice x Simian's "We are Your Friends". Kid Cudi collaborated with his studio's fashion line to create an exclusive line of jackets. His video screened at Surface to Air's Fashion Night Out Party in New York on September 8, 2011. It debuted on a Thursday afternoon, almost ten months after the release of his second studio album. The video arrived in support of the new line of jackets by Kid Cudi's clothing boutique Surface to Air.

The music video for "Mr. Rager" took the form of a six-minute short film. It displays Cudi fighting his way through hordes of gritty yet well-dressed gang members. Situated in a post-apocalypic life, Cudi engages in battle with a gang of violent psychopaths. For a time, Cudi performs quite well for himself and lands a myriad of blows against his opponent; until he's gutted by his evil doppelganger. The video features a cameo appearance from Cudi's mentor, Kanye West.

== Live performances ==
Kid Cudi provided a live rendition of "Mr. Rager" during a concert held at the University of Illinois' Assembly Hall in Champaign, Illinois. The concert was the second stop on a mini-tour of colleges leading up to the release of his third studio album, Indicud. The emotional performance was accompanied by audiences holding lighters.

Cudi performed "Mr. Rager" for a set held at Barclays Center in Brooklyn during his extended his fall "Cudi Life Tour" on March 22, 2015. A few of his prior shows from the tour had been cancelled and rescheduled due to his illness. Cudi performed atop a stage that featured a prickly, frigid-looking cave. He wore his "Satellite Academy Space Suit," a matte grey neck-to-toe 'fit is that is of a variant of Iron Man's uniform. After a groaning rendition of "Soundtrack 2 My Life", Cudi closed the song with a brief story about his cocaine addiction and how it negatively affected his singing years ago. He then segued into "Mr. Rager," during which Cudi wailed the song's chorus and humorously said, "Say no to coke!"

Kid Cudi gave a live performance of "Mr. Rager" before a crowd of 90,000 fans for the annual Coachella Valley Music and Arts Festival held at the Empire Polo Club in Indio, California, in the Coachella Valley in the Colorado Desert. With a grin on his face, Cudi leaped across the stage and sang the song wearing a red cut-off T-shirt matching his microphone. He cheerfully told the audience, "Let's get through this, I want to go catch MGMT after this." His performance was cited as one of the fifty greatest moments of Coachella by Rolling Stone staffers, who labeled him, "Happiest First-Timer." They wrote, "It's one of the Coachella rituals: performers from Los Angeles announce how many years they attended the festival as fans before they got tapped to play, while first-timers from out of town declare how excited they are to be there. But nobody seemed happier to be making his Coachella debut than Kid Cudi."

== Legacy ==
American internet personality Ben Breedlove died from his life-long heart condition shortly after making a YouTube tribute to Kid Cudi. Kid Cudi, who Breedlove had said came to him in a vision during YouTube videos he posted before his death, was among the millions touched by his memory. Upon coming across Breedlove's story, Cudi was moved by his strength. Cudi broke down after watching the two-part YouTube video the young fan posted. Shortly afterward, Kid Cudi wrote a heartfelt letter on Tumblr dedicated to Ben Breedlove expressing his condolences.

== Use in media ==
The Cleaning Lady Season 1, Episode 9, "Coming Home Again" featured the song at the closing of the episode.

“Mr. Rager” is the entrance song for Boston Red Sox pitcher Ranger Suárez.

"Mr. Rager" became a playoff anthem for the 2025 Seattle Mariners.

== Charts ==
Charts	Peak position
US Billboard Hot 100	77

== Certifications ==
Certifications for "Mr. Rager"
Region	Certification	Certified units/sales
Denmark (IFPI Danmark)	Gold	45,000^{‡}
New Zealand (RMNZ)	2× Platinum	60,000^{‡}
United Kingdom (BPI)	Silver	200,000^{‡}
^{‡} Sales+streaming figures based on certification alone.
