= Arkansas (film) =

2020 film by Clark Duke

- Theatrical release poster
- Directed by: Clark Duke
- Screenplay by: Clark Duke; Andrew Boonkrong
- Based on: Arkansas by John Brandon
- Produced by: Clark Duke; Patrick Hibler; Jeff Rice; Martin Sprock; Ryan R. Johnson
- Starring: Liam Hemsworth; Clark Duke; Michael Kenneth Williams; Vivica A. Fox; Eden Brolin; Chandler Duke; John Malkovich; Vince Vaughn
- Cinematography: Steven Meizler
- Edited by: Patrick J. Don Vito
- Music by: The Flaming Lips; Alexander Taylor; Matthew James
- Production companies: Hercules Film Fund; Rhea Films; Storyboard Media; Sprockfeller Pictures; Don Kee Productions; Media Finance Capital
- Distributed by: Lionsgate
- Release date: May 5, 2020
- Running time: 116 minutes
- Country: United States
- Language: English

Arkansas is a 2020 American neo-noir crime thriller film directed by Clark Duke in his directorial debut, from a screenplay he wrote with Andrew Boonkrong. It stars Liam Hemsworth, Clark Duke, Michael Kenneth Williams, Vivica A. Fox, Eden Brolin, Chandler Duke, John Malkovich and Vince Vaughn. It is based on the novel Arkansas by John Brandon.

== Plot ==
Chapter One: Boredom is Beautiful

Drug dealer Kyle Ribb is "promoted" to move product wholesale in Arkansas, part of a loose criminal organization run by a man named Frog. Kyle and his new partner, Swin Horn, meet Bright, a park ranger working for Frog. He explains that Kyle and Swin are to work under him, living on the park grounds with cover identities as park employees while they traffic drugs across the southern U.S.

Swin begins dating Johnna, a nurse who brings him to a curio shop run by an eccentric owner. Kyle and Swin receive orders from a woman called “Her” to complete a deal in Castor, Louisiana, where they deliver product to a talkative Greek man. His grandson, Nick, follows them back to Arkansas. He assaults Bright in his home, and then tortures him for his stash of money, but both are killed in a struggle for Nick's gun. Believing they will be blamed if Frog's organization discovers what happened, Kyle and Swin bury the bodies. Kyle returns to Castor and kills the old Greek man.

Chapter Two: Frog

In 1985, Frog – revealed to be the curio shop owner – is a West Memphis pawnbroker. He is given a supply of drugs to move, but is kidnapped by a man hired by his buyer. Frog kills the man and escapes to Pine Bluff to work for another drug dealer named Almond. After an undetermined amount of time passes, Frog becomes dissatisfied with his share, and he calls the police on Almond in a set-up. The two amicably split after Almond is sent to prison, and Frog takes over his middleman on the condition that he kills Almond's hated ex brother-in-law and sets his sister up in a comfortable nursing home. The middleman later sells his wholesaler to Frog.

Chapter Three: The Bodies

In the present, Kyle and Swin discover Bright had $44,000 in cash and a suitcase full of human bones. Maintaining a cover story about Bright's disappearance, Kyle and Swin accept another order from Her in person. Johnna visits them at Bright's house when Barry, a man claiming to be the son of Bright's friend, arrives to inform Bright of his father's death. Kyle sends him away, but contradicts the lies they had told Johnna.

Swin takes Kyle to the curio shop to buy a gun. Unaware Frog is the proprietor, Swin offers to sell him the bones, but Frog declines to do business with them. Johnna reveals to Kyle that she is pregnant and is aware he and Swin are criminals. Kyle tells her everything, but assures her they have no plans to leave, and Johnna and Swin prepare for their child. Barry returns and menaces Swin and Johnna, but is killed by Kyle.

Chapter Four: The Twins

In 1988, Frog recruits twin brothers Tim and Thomas to his operation. Years later, now operating out of a donut shop, Frog and the twins are approached by a Knoxville dealer's middleman for as much product as they can gather. Handling the deal alone, Frog is double-crossed and beaten before the twins arrive and kill the middleman. Frog, learning from Almond's mistake, leaves his operation to the twins to run themselves, retiring with a percentage of their earnings to open his curio shop.

Chapter Five: One Way Trips

In the present, Kyle and Swin intimidate Her into giving them their next package of product. Frog, who sent Barry to investigate, is determined to eliminate them, and gives Her a final package for them to deliver in Hot Springs. At the Fordyce bathhouse, the pair are ambushed by the twins. While Thomas executes Swin, Tim tries to interrogate Kyle, who realizes Frog's identity. Kyle escapes after gouging out Tim's eyes, and gives Johnna the stash of money, telling her to find Swin's family in Gray, Kentucky.

Frog advises Thomas to forgo revenge, but Thomas empties his joint accounts with Frog and euthanizes his blinded brother, leaving to hunt down Kyle. Burying Tim and burning his curios, Frog calls a contact and prepares to rebuild his business in Oklahoma, but is confronted by an injured Kyle. Seeing Kyle's broken arm, Frog deduces that he encountered and killed Thomas. Kyle shoots Frog dead and takes his contact's information, resigned to the life of a drug dealer. The film ends as Johnna drives alone through the night.

== Cast ==
- Liam Hemsworth as Kyle Ribb
- Clark Duke as Swin Horn
- Michael Kenneth Williams as Almond
- Vivica A. Fox as "Her"
- Eden Brolin as Johnna
- Chandler Duke as Nick
- John Malkovich as "Bright"
- Vince Vaughn as "Frog"
- Brad William Henke as Thomas
- Patrick Muldoon as Joe
- Jeff Chase as Tim
- Jacob Zachar as The Stranger
- Barry Primus as Old Greek
- Juston Street as Barry

== Production ==
In October 2018, it was announced Liam Hemsworth, Vince Vaughn and Clark Duke had joined the cast of the film, with Duke also directing the film, from a screenplay by himself and Andrew Boonkrong. Principal photography began the same month in Mobile, Alabama, with additional filming locations being in Hot Springs, Arkansas and Little Rock, Arkansas.

== Release ==
The world premiere of Arkansas was going to be held at the South by Southwest festival on March 15, 2020, but the festival was cancelled amid fears of the COVID-19 pandemic. The film was scheduled to have a limited theatrical and Premium VOD release by Lionsgate on May 1, 2020. It was instead released on Premium VOD, DVD and Blu-ray on May 5, 2020.

== Reception ==
On Rotten Tomatoes, the film has an approval rating of 47% based on 66 reviews, with an average rating of 5.6/10. The website's critics consensus reads: "Arkansas has an appealing low-key charm, but this character-driven neo-noir is too diffuse and derivative to leave much of an impression." On Metacritic, the film has a weighted average score of 55 out of 100, based on 19 critics, indicating "mixed or average" reviews.

Dennis Harvey of Variety Magazine praised actor Clark Duke, while Screen Rant gave 2 out of 5, saying that "[It] struggles to find an internal rhythm - resulting in a laid-back crime film that suffers from flat execution, [despite] some bright spots." Devika Girish of The New York Times criticized the acting of Kyle by Liam Hemsworth, saying that his monologue about lacking a "philosophy of life" was delivered as a voice-over. The Hollywood Reporter called the film "Underwhelming, despite a surprising abundance of talent".

It also got 3 out of 5 from the Rolling Stone and The Guardian. The A.V. Club gave it a grade B−.

Julian Roman of the MovieWeb said in his opening comments that "[Arkansas] is backwards and lacks substance", while Datebook, a subsidiary of the San Francisco Chronicle, said that "Despite being in over their heads, [the main characters] actually have some good survival instincts".
