= Maniac (2011 film) =

2011 American film by Shia LaBeouf

- Promotional poster
- Directed by: Shia LaBeouf
- Written by: Shia LaBeouf; Kid Cudi; Cage
- Produced by: Jeff Balis; T. J. Sakasegawa; Lorenzo Eduardo
- Starring: Shia LaBeouf; Kid Cudi; Cage
- Cinematography: Phedon Papamichael
- Edited by: Justin Mitchell
- Music by: Scott Mescudi; Dot da Genius
- Production companies: Grassy Slope; Ragin4Dayz; Dilated Pixels
- Distributed by: Gaiam Vivendi Entertainment
- Release date: October 31, 2011 (United States)
- Running time: 10 minutes
- Country: United States
- Languages: English; French

Maniac is an American short slasher film, directed by Shia LaBeouf. It was released for free on YouTube, on October 31, 2011. The short film stars American rappers Scott "Kid Cudi" Mescudi and Chris "Cage" Palko as French-speaking serial killers. Mescudi and Palko also co-wrote the film with LaBeouf.

== Synopsis ==
A filmmaker (Shia LaBeouf) documents the exploits of two serial killers (Scott Mescudi and Chris Palko).

== Background ==
Shia LaBeouf first directed a music video for New York-based rapper Cage in 2009, for his track "I Never Knew You": "I'm 22 and I'm directing my favorite rapper's music video," LaBeouf told LA Weekly of the project, "This shit is better than riding unicorns." It was through that project that he met Cleveland-bred rapper Kid Cudi, which led to LaBeouf filming and directing Kid Cudi's video for "Marijuana", which was shot at the 2010 High Times Cannabis Cup in Amsterdam. LaBeouf subsequently went on to collaborate with Cudi and Cage on a short film titled MANIAC. Kid Cudi first spoke of the short film on March 5, 2011, via his Twitter feed, when he announced: "[the] maniac horror short will be released on halloween, rager short this summer, marijuana video this spring. i got you guys, no worries."

The short film was inspired by Cudi's song of the same name, from his 2010 album Man on the Moon II: The Legend of Mr. Rager and is an homage to the 1992 Belgian black comedy crime mockumentary, Man Bites Dog. In an interview with Complex, Cudi went into detail about the short film, as he discussed how Shia LaBeouf reached out to him to do the project, playing the role of a killer, funding the video and why was it in French: "It was me creating the back story for this person in my mind. What you see just seems like senseless acts of crime happening but in my character’s mind it was always justified. When you watch it, it’s like, ‘Why are these things happening?’ You want answers but there's no answers really given. When I was in character, it was always justified for me." He also added "When it came time to shoot, it was as real as possible and you were scared of this character. I literally transformed into this person. I didn’t talk much on set, didn’t crack many jokes, I kept to myself."

== Release ==
On June 3, 2011, Kid Cudi released the first trailer for the short film. On October 31, 2011, in the spirit of Halloween, Kid Cudi released the short film via YouTube.

== Cast ==
- Scott Mescudi as Twisted Killer
- Chris Palko as Dark Killer
- Shia LaBeouf as The Director
- Ron Ayers as Sound Man
- Ariel M. Carlson as Murdered Woman in Park
- Jeremy Cook as Pedestrian
- Erika Hoveland as Waitress
- Bill Lumbert as French Diner Stud
- Sydney Lumbert as Hallway Girl
- Melissa Marra as Restaurant Patron
- Eric Adam Swenson as Diner Patron
- Bryan Valko as Shotgun Murder Victim
- Laurie Valko as Murder Victim
- Johnny Marra as Restaurant Patron (uncredited)
