= I Dream Too Much =

I Dream Too Much may refer to:

- I Dream Too Much (1935 film), a 1935 American romantic comedy film
- I Dream Too Much (2015 film), a 2015 American comedy-drama film
- I Dream Too Much (album), a 1984 album by Jimmy Knepper
