= Man on the Moon II: The Legend of Mr. Rager =

Studio album by Kid Cudi
- Released: November 9, 2010
- Recorded: 2009–2010
- Studios: Avex (Honolulu); The Broski Room (New York City); Electric Lady (New York City); Germano (New York City); MSR (New York City); Scott's Crib (New York City); Circle House (Miami); Glenwood Place (Burbank); Larrabee (Los Angeles); Paramount (Los Angeles); Record Plant (Los Angeles); NightBird (West Hollywood); Westlake Sound (West Hollywood); Parkland Playhouse (Parkland)
- Genres: Alternative hip-hop; neo-psychedelia; progressive rap
- Length: 62:06
- Labels: Dream On; GOOD; Universal Motown
- Producers: Anthony Kilhoffer; Blended Babies; Chuck Inglish; Dot da Genius; Emile Haynie; Jim Jonsin; Kid Cudi; Plain Pat

Kid Cudi chronology
Man on the Moon: The End of Day (2009)	Man on the Moon II: The Legend of Mr. Rager (2010)	Indicud (2013)

Singles from Man on the Moon II: The Legend of Mr. Rager
- 1. "Erase Me" Released: August 17, 2010; 2. "Mr. Rager" Released: October 25, 2010

Man on the Moon II: The Legend of Mr. Rager is the second studio album by the American rapper Kid Cudi. It was released on November 9, 2010, through Dream On and GOOD Music, and distributed by Universal Motown Records. It serves as a sequel to his debut studio album Man on the Moon: The End of Day (2009), and is the second installment of the Man on the Moon trilogy. Production for the album took place during 2009 to 2010 at various recording studios and was handled by long-time collaborators Emile Haynie and Plain Pat. It also featured contributions from Anthony Kilhoffer, Blended Babies, Chuck Inglish, Dot da Genius, Jim Jonsin, and Rami Beatz, among others. The album was supported by two singles: "Erase Me" and "Mr. Rager".

The album incorporates alternative and psychedelic elements to the sound that Cudi explored in his previous album. It features a blend of dark and emotional lyrics, exploring themes of depression, loneliness, detachment, and isolation. The album also highlights other topics, such as Cudi's former cocaine addiction, fame, and alcoholism, as well as family issues and women. The album features guest appearances from CeeLo Green, Mary J. Blige, Kanye West, Cage, St. Vincent, GLC, Chip tha Ripper, and Nicole Wray. Further contributors include Mike Dean, Larry Gold, Ken Lewis, Frank Romano, and Ray Bradley.

Man on the Moon II: The Legend of Mr. Rager debuted at number three on the US Billboard 200, selling 169,000 copies during its first week of release. The album received generally positive reviews from critics, due to its diverse change to the sound and continuing theme of the album. On March 27, 2018, the album was certified platinum by the Recording Industry Association of America (RIAA) for sales of more than a million copies in the United States.

== Background ==
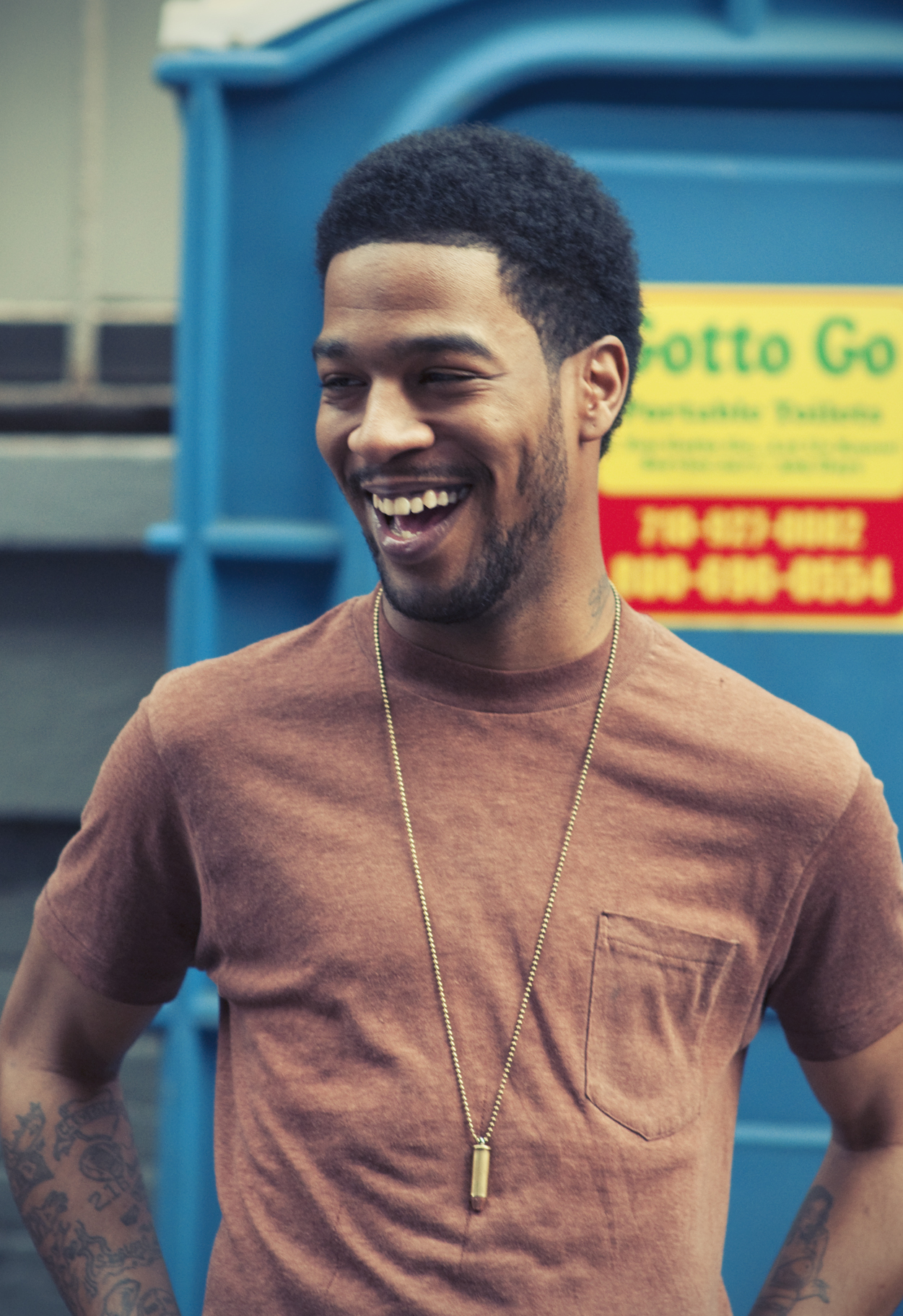
Kid Cudi in 2010

On August 25, 2009, Cudi announces that his second album was going to be in a trilogy, it was originally going to be titled Man on the Moon: The Ghost in the Machine. In the same interview, he was still working on the title for the third Man on the Moon. Three weeks later, Cudi releases Man on the Moon: The End of Day, it sold 104,000 in the first week and charted at number four. In a MTV interview, Cudi announced that the follow-up to his debut album would be a compilation album entitled Cudder, which would have many collaborations. He stated he had already recorded songs with Snoop Dogg, Travis Barker, Clipse, Cage and Pharrell, and would also like to work with Drake, Green Day, Kings of Leon, Robin Thicke, The Killers and The Postal Service on the album. On January 7, 2010, Cudi revealed in a video interview with Karmaloop TV that he was working with Pharrell in Miami for the album. A week later, he changes the title from Cudder to Cudder and the Revolution of Evolution at a show in Milwaukee. Few months later, Cudi took off to his blog to announce that he scrapped the collaborative theme of Cudder for a project that is more personal. He stated:

"A lot of you have read the news and think they know Cudi, got slick shit to say amongst your peers or just flat out hate me but you haven't the slightest clue of who I am. I will tell the story of Mr Rager."

He announces that the album was going to be titled Man on the Moon II: The Legend of Mr. Rager. Cudi stated that "Man on the Moon II is dark by nature and instead of bringing you into my dreams like my first album, I'm bringing you into my reality, good and bad. It will explain more of who I am as well as pushing the envelope musically." In a Complex interview for his cover shoot titled "Mad Man on the Moon", he talks about the album and stating "It's explicit, but smart explicit. I'm not holding back. I have no regard for what people consider right or wrong. Some things I follow—like the law, from here on out. But other than that, I'm doing whatever the fuck I want to do. I'm not holding back. That's why I've been so excited about this move to L.A., because I just want to keep growing creatively, all over, as a human being." Later in the interview, he talked about why the album changed saying "When I started making records like "Erase Me". I wanted this album to be fun, but the dark shit was my life at that time. I was fighting not to write that shit. It got frustrating writing a collab album—I just lost interest, and it became more of a task, rather than something I wanted to do. That's not how it's supposed to feel. The day it becomes work, you need to retire."

== Recording and production ==
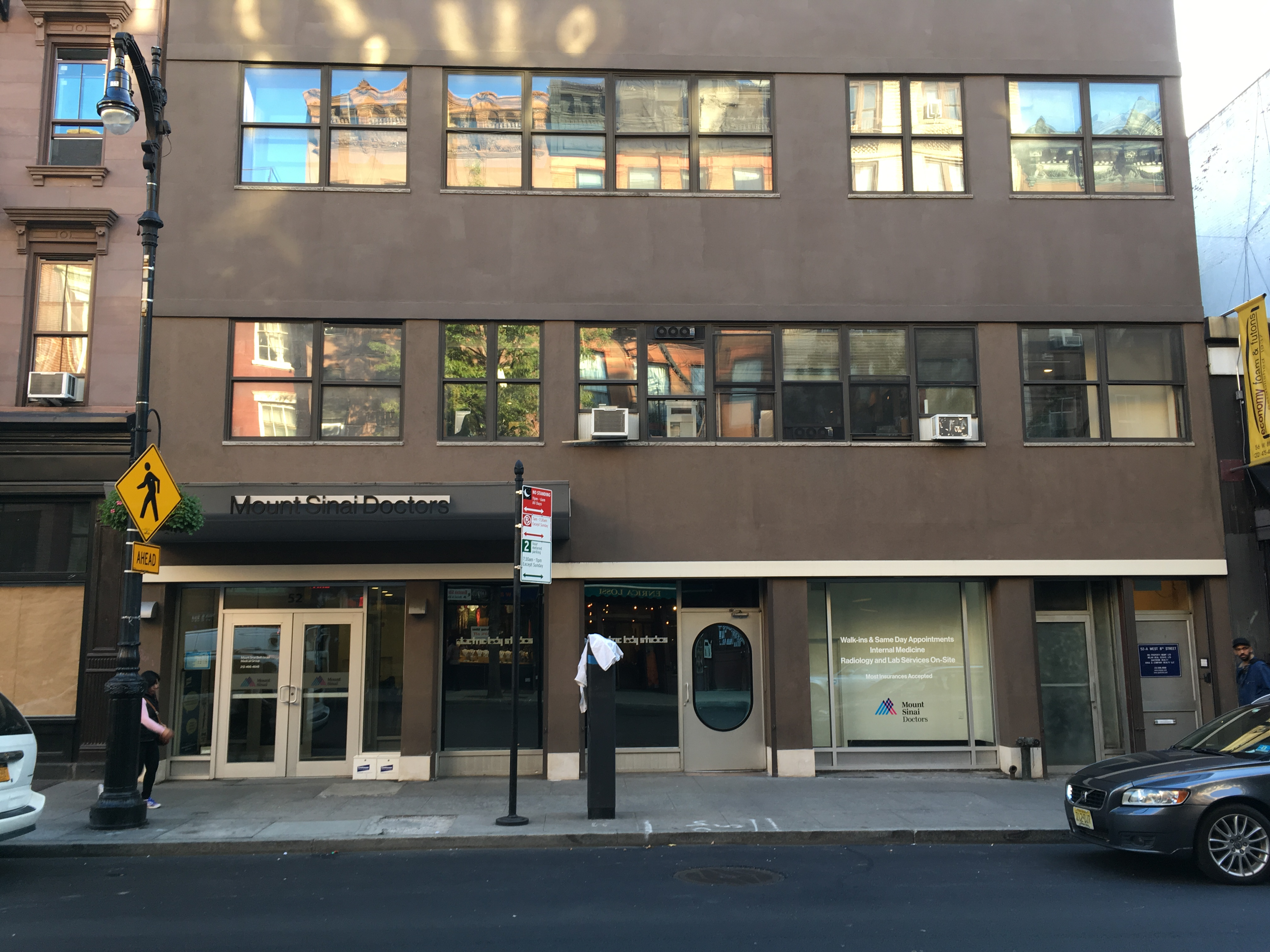
Parts of the album were recorded at Electric Lady Studios

Recording sessions for the album took place at several recording studios, including Avex Recording Studios in Honolulu, Electric Lady Studios in New York City, Glenwood Place Studios in Burbank, Parkland Playhouse in Parkland, The Broski Room in New York City, Westlake Sound in West Hollywood. The track "We Aite (Wake Your Mind Up)" was recorded at the Germano Studios in New York City, and other tracks like "Marijuana" and "Ashin Kusher" was recorded at the Record Plant in Los Angeles. The title track "Mr. Rager" was recorded at NightBird Recording Studios in West Hollywood. "All Along" was recorded at the MSR Studios in New York City, and the last track "Trapped in My Mind" was recorded at Scott's Crib in New York City. The album was mixed at Larrabee Studios in Los Angeles, Circle House Recording Studios in Miami, Paramount Recording Studios in Los Angeles, and MSR Studios. Prior to the process, it was mixed by Manny Marroquin, along with Christian Plata and Erik Madrid. All the songs were mastered by Vlado Meller at Universal Mastering Studios.

Producer Emile Haynie handled most of the tracks' production. Outside of Cudi's longtime collaborator, Cudi also collaborated with Grammy Award winning producer Anthony Kilhoffer, who has worked frequently with Kanye West. Composer Larry Gold arranged and conducted with strings on four tracks, and producer Mike Dean contributed guitar on three tracks for the album. In April 2010, Cudi was in the studio with recording artist Kenna.

Jim Jonsin, who produced the album's first single compared Cudi's blending of sounds to B.o.B's genre-bending album The Adventures of Bobby Ray, stating "It's a mix. It's kind of some club stuff, some hip-hop traditional rap stuff, and then some rock-pop stuff. He's goin' everywhere." Cudi later said that Jonsin had misinformed fans about the new album, "I got mad love for Jim but he was misinformed. There is no Kanye & Kid Cudi Duran Duran song, I'd sample a 90s record before a 80s record anyday and when I worked with Jim, I hadn't even started sessions with Plain Pat and Emile yet so the direction of my album was yet to be determined."

In September 2010, in an interview with Spike TV, Cudi spoke on the album's guest appearances: "Man, when it comes to features, I kinda just stick to my homies. My peoples Chip tha Ripper, GLC [who is] a GOOD Music affiliate. Got my boy Cage over there, and Mary J. Blige on the album. We got Cee-Lo on the album. It's just really taking off where we last stopped."

== Music and lyrics ==
Though Kanye West (on his 2008 album, 808s & Heartbreak) and Drake also can play the brooding loner pretty persuasively, Cudi takes the persona several steps further on "Man on the Moon II". The five-part narrative follows a character who tries to act like the hip-hop star he has become.

— Greg Kot, Chicago Tribune

Man on the Moon II: The Legend of Mr. Rager expands on the spacey, atmospheric aesthetic of its predecessor, The End of Day. It features an eerie, supernatural production that incorporates alternative rock, psychedelic, post-punk, and new wave. The album's elements consist of; electro-grooves, minimalist beats, somber strings, woozy synths, ghostly samples, distorted guitars, and melancholy melodies.

Music writers noted "1990s-era alt-rock" and a "1970s-era sound" in the album's music. Spin writer Charles Aaron noted "His cautionary journey takes the music in a makeshift '90s-alt-rock direction, jacked up on jittery beats that eerily mirror the rush and crash of someone who's been given way too much access to way too much ass." Matthew Cole of Slant Magazine wrote "it finds that Cudi burrowing deeper into the black hole of spacey psychedelia, fusing the clinical, synthetic hip-hop of 808s & Heartbreak with rock sounds derived from Hendrix, Pink Floyd, and Zappa." Sputnikmusic writer Channing Freeman commented on the production saying "the beats are slower, they feel somehow more claustrophobic, as if the walls of the songs are closing in around Cudi and he's trying to reach the end before being crushed."

Lyricially, it continues on the autobiography track series like its predecessor, and follows the themes like depression, loneliness, detachment, and isolation, but in a darker context. Greg Kot of Chicago Tribune commented "He plunges into a world of bravado and after-parties, with their endless supply of drugs and women." Cudi's lyrics on Man on the Moon II address his former cocaine addiction, newfound fame, family issues, alcoholism, and women. On the first two songs of the album "Scott Mescudi vs the World" and "Revofev", Cudi provides an introduction to the album where he demonstrates the high and lows, also telling the kids to have hope. "Don't Play This Song" is where Cudi gives a brief explanation of his history of drug use, and he gives an unraveling of his suppressed thoughts hinting at suicide. "Marijuana" is an ode to cannabis where Cudi tactfully presents it as a relief to his mental distress. The lead single "Erase Me" is about a girl who hates Cudi, but can't forget him. Throughout the album, the subject matter of doubt shines, with songs that display emotions of uncertainty ("These Worries", "The End") and the dark experiences that Cudi had ("Maniac", "Mr. Rager"). On "Ghost!" he describes going through life's trials and tribulations and becoming desensitized to the harrowing journey. SgtPeppers of Sputnikmusic notes "Through metaphors, we learn about the rise and fall, and the rise of the alter-ego "Mr. Rager". How he, in the end, paid the price for all of his antagonizing actions, but became a better person because of it. Experience = Wisdom, this is the theme of the album. And though this album is all about "Mr. Rager", this is the most honest he has ever been with us."

== Release and promotion ==
Originally, the album was tentatively scheduled for an August release, but then later on, it was revealed that the release date was going to be on September 14, 2010. However, in July 2010, it was announced that album would be pushed back to September 28, then it was revealed that it would be settled for October 26 release. Finally, it would be announced that the album would be arriving on the final official release date, November 9, 2010.

On Cudi's official website on June 10, 2010, he posts that he will be performing at the Bape Store in New York, and left a message saying "for the revolution". Later on that night, he would go on and perform the track "Revofev", which stands for "Revolution of Evolution". Seven days later, the track would be released as a promotional single through Cudi's website on June 17, 2010, the song is produced by Plain Pat. On August 16, 2010, three tracks ("Erase Me", "Wylin Cause I'm Young", "Mr. Rager") would be released through mixtape called G.O.O.D Ass Mixtape, the next day, "Erase Me" was officially released as a radio single. The song "Wild'n Cuz I'm Young" originally included a verse from Kanye West; years later Cudi revealed Jay-Z had also recorded a verse for the track, which was meant to be remixed.

On October 16, 2010, Cudi released the official album cover to Man on the Moon II. A week later, Cudi reveals the tracklist for the album. On October 29, 2010, the track "These Worries" was released. Three days later, Cudi releases the official trailer for the album. On November 4, 2010, it was revealed that Cudi was releasing a short film for the track "Maniac", and the film was going to be directed by actor Shia LaBeouf. On The Tonight Show Starring Jimmy Fallon, the same night, Cudi along with rapper Cage and musician St. Vincent would perform and debut the track "Maniac". On the night of the release, there was news that Cudi was going to hold an album signing session at the Bape Store in New York, where he'll also unveil a new, limited edition "Mr. Rager" T-shirt for the clothing line. When Cudi arrived, he was kneeling on top of a truck as the driver rode through the crowd until the front of the store, then he proceeded to perform "Revofev" and "Pursuit of Happiness" for the fans.

The physical deluxe edition of the album includes a cover with the same design, but a different galaxy. Also it comes packaged alongside a DVD featuring a short film entitled The Journey of Mr. Rager which is a full-length 20-minute documentary that gives a glimpse into Cudi's life. It includes video shoots, live performances, and behind the scenes footage. The documentary is directed, shot and edited by Jason Goldwatch. On the iTunes deluxe edition, it includes a bonus track named "Maybe". On April 15, 2011, Cudi announced on his Myspace blog The Cud Life Tour, a United States tour that took place April 18 through August 28, and the supporting act would be Chip tha Ripper. Throughout his tour, Cudi would deliver fans a glimpse into his tour through his vlog by a user named Kev on Vimeo. On October 31, 2011, the short film Maniac was released, it features a 10-minute clip of a couple of cold-blooded killers as they go about their business some snowy holiday season. Repeated onscreen references to the camera might appear to indicate some sort of underlying theme about the complicity of the viewer. The video although had very little to do with the song.

=== Singles ===
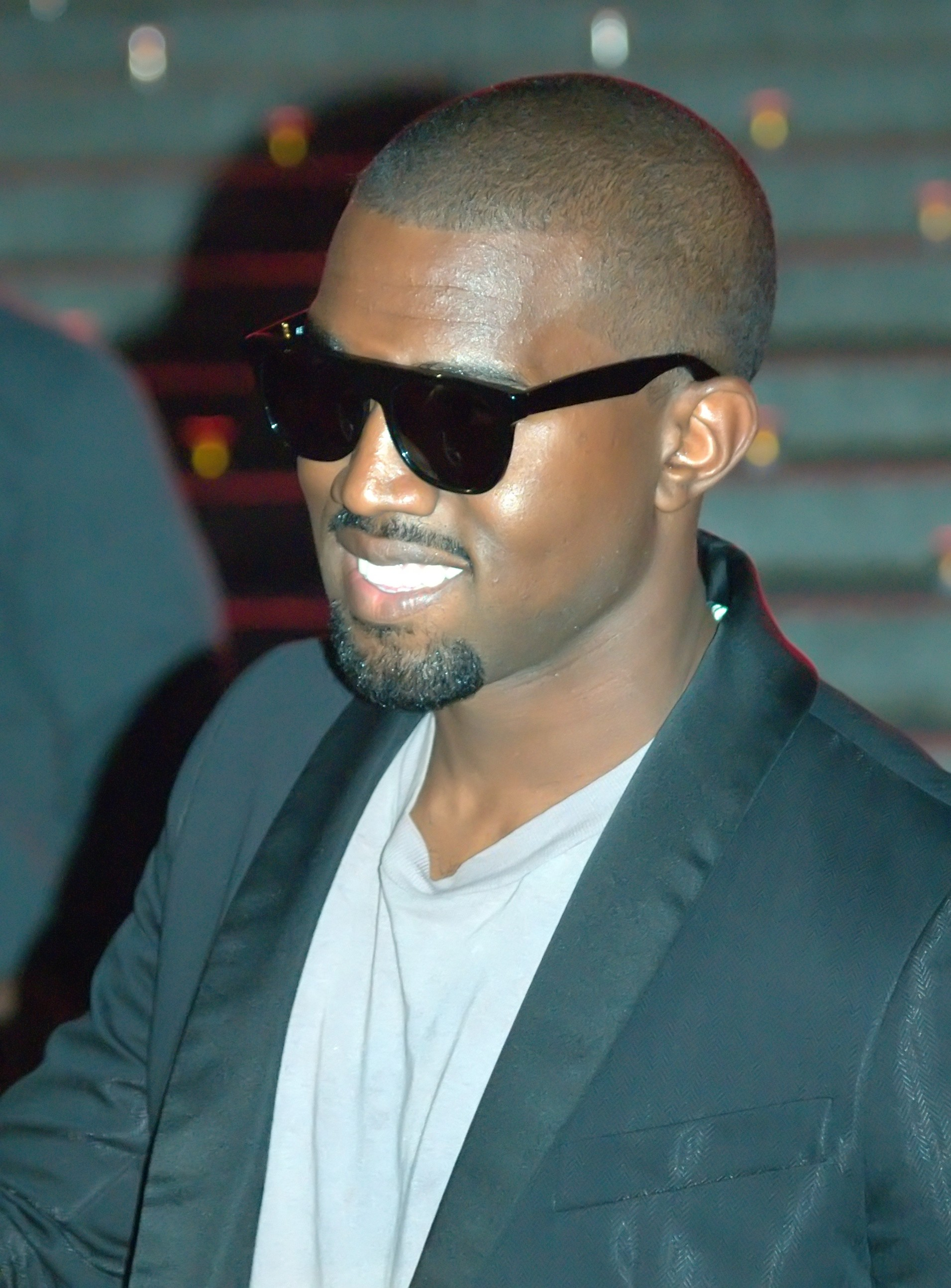
Hip-hop artist Kanye West contributed vocals to "Erase Me".

The album's lead single, "Erase Me" featuring Kanye West, was officially released to rhythm/crossover radio on August 17, 2010. The single spent five weeks and made a hot shot debut on the US Billboard Hot 100 at number 22. On the Hot Canadian Digital Song Sales, it spent 10 weeks and peaked at number eight. On September 5, the single debuted on the UK Singles Chart at number 58 and number 18 on the UK R&B Singles Chart. On August 30, the single debuted on the New Zealand Single Charts at number 22. On October 12, 2010, the music video was released, the clip is a tongue-in-cheek performance video reviving the pompous rock days of the late-1960s with the artists dressing up and adopting alter egos. Cudi plays a Jimi Hendrix influenced character, sporting a black curly afro wig and headband. West, who makes a short appearance to drop his verse, appears onstage wearing a black blazer, shades, jewelry, and wears a crown of gold laurels. Christopher Mintz-Plasse and Clark Duke make up the rest of Kid Cudi's band in the video. On September 16, 2016, the single was certified platinum by the Recording Industry Association of America (RIAA).

The album's second single, "Mr. Rager", was officially released as a digital download on October 25, 2010. The single debuted at number 77 on the Billboard Hot 100. On September 8, 2011, Cudi released the official music video for "Mr. Rager". The video, directed by Jeremie Rozan from Surface to Air, features a brief cameo appearance from his mentor Kanye West.

=== Other songs ===
The track "Scott Mescudi vs the World" debuted at number 92 on the Billboard Hot 100 and number 20 on the R&B/Hip-Hop Digital Song Sales. The track "Marijuana" debuted at number 54 on the Billboard Hot 100 and number nine on the R&B/Hip-Hop Digital Song Sales, where it spent two weeks on the chart. On June 1, 2010, the music video would be released. On April 10, 2014, the track was certified gold by the Recording Industry Association of America (RIAA).

== Critical reception ==
Man on the Moon II: The Legend of Mr. Rager ratings
Aggregate scores
Source	Rating
AnyDecentMusic?	6.6/10
Metacritic	69/100
Review scores
Source	Rating
AllMusic	3.5/5 stars
The A.V. Club	C
Chicago Tribune	3.5/4 stars
Entertainment Weekly	A−
NME	9/10
Pitchfork	6.7/10
Q	4/5 stars
Rolling Stone	2.5/5 stars
Slant Magazine	3.5/5 stars
Spin	8/10

Man on the Moon II: The Legend of Mr. Rager was met with generally positive reviews. At Metacritic, which assigns a normalized rating out of 100 to reviews from professional publications, the album received an average score of 69, based on 20 reviews. Aggregator AnyDecentMusic? gave it 6.6 out of 10, based on their assessment of the critical consensus.

Entertainment Weekly's Simon Vozick-Levinson called it "a cohesively constructed concept album that will reward repeat listens." Chicago Tribune writer Greg Kot complimented Cudi's themes of "the stoned-and-alone rapper" and stated, "the music is as consuming and intoxicating as the lifestyle Cudi describes." Charles Aaron of Spin commended it for "boldly reshaping Cudi's sound – with vivid production" and stated "The dizzy friction between rap's grasping for control and rock's desire to lose it entirely give Cudi's confessions a dicey, volatile edge." AllMusic writer David Jeffries said that, "just like on his debut, the soundscape is spacy and far-reaching, making this interstellar therapy session a much more interesting transmission. At its best, it's fascinating." Slant Magazine's Matthew Cole expressed that "the hybrid production style proves an atmospheric and eerie delight" and commended Cudi for his unconventional musical approach, writing in conclusion, "Pursuing genius at the expense of consistency might work out just fine for Cudi: I'm not convinced that he's a good rapper, but I'm pretty sure he's an important one." Mark Beaumont of NME called it "a grungy, filthy record full of angels and demons." Pitchfork's Jayson Greene called Man on the Moon II "a bumpy listen", but found it "more fully realized" than Cudi's debut album.

In a mixed review, Michaelangelo Matos of The A.V. Club found Cudi's delivery insouciant and the music merely "listenable", without "much grasp of any of the styles or modes he tries out." Dave Heaton of PopMatters viewed that its "subject matter" is not "delved into as creatively as on the debut album" and stated "Sometimes [Cudi] seems to be falling into the typical trap of sequels: replicating instead of moving forward." Rolling Stone's Jonah Weiner commended its "dramatic, breathtakingly stark production", but ultimately panned Cudi's performance and stated "he's grown rote in his self-pity and flat as a singer." Jon Pareles of The New York Times viewed that Cudi's rapping "wander[s] away while the track continues without him" and stated "In its utter self-absorption, the album teeters between fascinating and numbing." Nitsuh Abebe of New York called it "a weary and sometimes beautiful catalogue of trying times and overindulgence [...] a melodic take on hip-hop that feels woozy and genuinely passionate, inviting you as deeply into his head as the lyrics. [...] But vulnerability loses its power when it's calculated to sound dramatic and masculine."

=== Accolades ===
According to the site Album of the Year, Man on the Moon II was thirtieth-highest-rank album in the year-end lists by music critics, based on 16 lists. Complex ranked the album fourth, and it was ranked sixth by Rap Radar, it was ranked ninth by Spin, and it was voted seventh best hip-hop album by Pitchfork's Reader Poll. On December 23, 2010, Complex would place "Wild'n Cuz I'm Young" at number 25 on "The 25 Best Songs of 2010" list. Two years later, they would rank the album in the list of "25 Rap Albums From the Past Decade That Deserve Classic Status".

== Commercial performance ==
Man on the Moon II: The Legend of Mr. Rager debuted at number three on the US Billboard 200, with first-week sales of 169,000 copies. In its second week, the album has crossed the 200,000 sales mark. The album also topped the Billboard Rap Albums and R&B/Hip-Hop Albums in its debut week. As of December 2011, the album had sold 353,000 copies in the United States. On March 27, 2018, the album was certified platinum by the Recording Industry Association of America (RIAA) for sales of more than a million copies in the United States.

In Canada, the album debuted at number five on the Canadian Albums Chart. In United Kingdom, the album debuted at number 88 on the UK Albums Chart.

== Track listing ==
Act I: The World I Am Ruling
No.	Title	Writer(s)	Producer(s)	Length
1.	"Scott Mescudi vs. the World" (featuring CeeLo Green)	Scott Mescudi; Emile Haynie	Haynie	3:55
2.	"Revofev"	Mescudi; Patrick Reynolds	Plain Pat	3:03

Act II: A Stronger Trip
No.	Title	Writer(s)	Producer(s)	Length
3.	"Don't Play This Song" (featuring Mary J. Blige)	Mescudi; Haynie	Haynie	3:43
4.	"We Aite (Wake Your Mind Up)"	Mescudi; Haynie	Haynie	1:27
5.	"Marijuana"	Mescudi; Oladipo Omishore	Dot da Genius; Kid Cudi	4:20
6.	"Mojo So Dope"	Mescudi; Haynie; Jannis Noya Makrigiannis; Anders Rhedin; Fridolin Nordsø Schjoldan	Haynie	3:31

Act III: Party On
No.	Title	Writer(s)	Producer(s)	Length
7.	"Ashin' Kusher"	Mescudi; Evan Ingersoll	Chuck Inglish	3:49
8.	"Erase Me" (featuring Kanye West)	Mescudi; Kanye West; James Scheffer; Frank Romano	Jim Jonsin	3:13
9.	"Wild'n Cuz I'm Young"	Mescudi; Reynolds	Plain Pat	4:14
10.	"The Mood"	Mescudi; Haynie	Haynie	2:36

Act IV: The Transformation
No.	Title	Writer(s)	Producer(s)	Length
11.	"Maniac" (featuring Cage and St. Vincent)	Mescudi; Christian Palko; Anthony Kilhoffer; Anne Erin Clark	Kilhoffer	2:58
12.	"Mr. Rager"	Mescudi; Haynie	Haynie	4:54
13.	"These Worries" (featuring Mary J. Blige)	Mescudi; Haynie	Haynie	4:16
14.	"The End" (featuring GLC, Chip tha Ripper, and Nicole Wray)	Mescudi; Charles Worth; Leonard Harris; Nicole Wray; Richard Perry; Jonathan Keller; Skip Mahoney; James Purdie	Blended Babies	4:21

Act V: You Live & You Learn
No.	Title	Writer(s)	Producer(s)	Length
15.	"All Along"	Mescudi; Haynie	Haynie	3:23
16.	"Ghost!"	Mescudi; Haynie; Rusty Evans; V. Pike; T. Randazzo	Haynie	4:49
17.	"Trapped in My Mind"	Mescudi; Omishore	Dot da Genius; Kid Cudi	3:34

iTunes bonus track
No.	Title	Writer(s)	Producer	Length
18.	"Maybe" (Pre-Order only, also on Apple Music)	Mescudi; Omishore	Dot da Genius; Rami Beatz	2:50

Sample credits

- "Mojo So Dope" contains a sample of "Claustrophobia", as performed by Choir of Young Believers.
- "Maniac" contains a sample of "The Strangers", as performed by St. Vincent.
- "The End" contains a sample of "I Need Your Love", as performed by Skip Mahoney and The Casuals.
- "Ghost!" embodies a portion of "My Rainbow Life", as performed by The Freak Scene.

== Personnel ==
Credits for Man on the Moon II: The Legend of Mr. Rager adapted from AllMusic.

- Jennifer Beal – producer
- Blended Babies – producer
- Ray Bradley – guitar
- Sandy Brummels – creative director
- Chip tha Ripper – engineer
- Mike Dean – guitar, organ, piano
- R. Evans – producer
- Dot da Genius – engineer, mixing, producer
- Larry Gold – conductor, string arrangements, strings
- Leonard Harris – engineer
- Emile Haynie – engineer, executive producer, keyboards, producer, synthesizer
- Ghazi Hourani – engineer
- Matt Huber – assistant
- Chuck Inglish – producer
- Jim Jonsin – keyboards, producer, programming
- J.P. Keller – bass, guitar
- Kid Cudi – art direction, design, director, executive producer
- Anthony Kilhoffer – engineer, mixing, producer
- Brent Kolatalo – engineer
- Anthony Kronfle – engineer
- Ken Lewis – bass, guitar, keyboards, woodwind
- Pamela Littky – photography
- Erik Madrid – assistant
- Robert Marks – mixing
- Manny Marroquin – mixing
- Graham Marsh – engineer
- Sean McCoy – assistant
- Vlado Meller – mastering
- Christian Mochizuki – engineer
- Rich Perry – engineer
- Christian Plata – assistant
- Kevin Porter – engineer
- Patrick "Plain Pat" Reynolds – executive producer
- Frank Romano – guitar, bass
- Mark Santangelo – assistant
- Ryan West – engineer, mixing
- Jason Wilkie – assistant
- James Wisner – engineer
- Andrew Wright – engineer
- Anthony Wright – engineer

== Charts ==
=== Weekly charts ===
Chart performance for Man on the Moon II: The Legend of Mr. Rager
Chart (2010–2012)	Peak position
Australian Albums (ARIA)	65
Canadian Albums (Billboard)	5
French Albums (SNEP)	77
German Albums (Offizielle Top 100)	64
Swiss Albums (Schweizer Hitparade)	36
UK Albums (Official Charts)	88
UK R&B Albums (Official Charts)	12
US Billboard 200	3
US Top R&B/Hip-Hop Albums (Billboard)	1

=== Year-end charts ===
2010 year-end chart performance for Man on the Moon II: The Legend of Mr. Rager
Chart (2010)	Position
US Billboard 200	193
US Top R&B/Hip-Hop Albums (Billboard)	47

2011 year-end chart performance for Man on the Moon II: The Legend of Mr. Rager
Chart (2011)	Position
US Billboard 200	134
US Top R&B/Hip-Hop Albums (Billboard)	30

== Certifications ==
Certifications for Man on the Moon II: The Legend of Mr. Rager
Region	Certification	Certified units/sales
United States (RIAA)	Platinum	1,000,000^{‡}
^{‡} Sales+streaming figures based on certification alone.
