= Clark Duke =

American actor (born 1985)

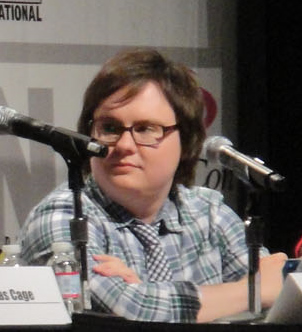
- Duke at the 2010 WonderCon
- Born: May 5, 1985 (age 41); Glenwood, Arkansas, U.S.
- Occupation: Actor
- Years active: 1992–present

Clark Duke (born May 5, 1985) is an American actor. He is known for his roles in the films Sex Drive (2008), Kick-Ass (2010), Hot Tub Time Machine (2010), and The Croods (2013), as well as playing Clark Green in The Office, Dale Kettlewell in Greek, and Barry in Two and a Half Men. Duke is also known for his role in I'm Dying Up Here as Ron Shack.

== Life and career ==
Duke was born on May 5, 1985, and raised in Arkansas, the son of Angela and Ronnie Duke. He was raised a Baptist. Duke graduated from Centerpoint High School in 2002.

In 1992, he was nominated for a Young Artist Award as an "Outstanding Actor Under Ten in a Television Series" for his work on Hearts Afire.

Along with best friend Michael Cera, Duke created, wrote, directed and produced the web series Clark and Michael in which he plays a fictional version of himself. The pilot episode was directed by Duke as his college thesis film at Loyola Marymount University.

He was a regular on the television series Greek as Rusty's Christian dorm roommate Dale. Duke appeared in the film Superbad in the small role of 'Party Teenager #1'.

In February 2008, he starred in Volume 2 of the web video series Drunk History with Jack Black, which can be found on YouTube. Michael Cera had appeared in the previous episode, Drunk History, Volume 1.

In 2008, Duke had his first co-starring film role in Sex Drive. He co-starred with Eddie Murphy in A Thousand Words, which was completed in 2008 but remained unreleased until 2012. He appeared in Kick-Ass with Aaron Taylor-Johnson and Nicolas Cage, and played Jacob, the nephew of Adam Yates (John Cusack) in Hot Tub Time Machine. He voiced Thunk in the 2013 animated film, The Croods.

In 2010, he had a cameo in a Kid Cudi music video "Erase Me".

He also appeared as Clark Green in the ninth and final season of the American version of The Office. He reprised his role from Kick-Ass in its sequel Kick-Ass 2, released August 2013.

Duke made his major motion picture directorial debut in 2020 with the film Arkansas, about two friends who live in Arkansas and work for a Chicago-based drug kingpin, whom they have never met. Set in his home state, Duke co-starred with Liam Hemsworth, Michael Kenneth Williams, Vince Vaughn, John Malkovich, Eden Brolin, and Vivica A. Fox.

He voiced Brett Hand in the Netflix series Inside Job.

== Filmography ==
Film
Year	Title	Role	Notes
2007	Superbad	Party Teenager	
2008	Sex Drive	Lance Johnson	
2010	Kick-Ass	Marty	
2010	Hot Tub Time Machine	Jacob	
2010	Journey of Mr. Rager	Himself	
2012	A Thousand Words	Aaron Wiseberger	
2013	Identity Thief	Everett	
2013	The Croods	Thunk (voice)	
2013	Kick-Ass 2	Marty / Battle Guy	
2013	A.C.O.D.	Trey	
2014	A Merry Friggin' Christmas	Nelson	
2015	Hot Tub Time Machine 2	Jacob	
2016	Bad Moms	Dale Kipler	
2017	The Last Movie Star	Doug	
2018	Song of Back and Neck	Atkins	
2020	Arkansas	Swin Horn	Also writer, director, producer
2020	The Croods: A New Age	Thunk (voice)	

Television
Year	Title	Role	Notes
1992–1995	Hearts Afire	Elliot Hartman	Main role
2004	CSI: Crime Scene Investigation	Frat Boy #1	Episode: "What's Eating Gilbert Grissom?"
2006	Clark and Michael	Clark	Also producer
2006	Campus Ladies	Actor	Episode: "The Dare"
2007–2011	Greek	Dale Kettlewell	Main role
2008–2020	Robot Chicken	Various (voices)	7 episodes
2010	WWE Raw	Guest host	
2010	Childrens Hospital	Captain Stern	Episode: "Joke Overload"
2012	New Girl	Cliff	Episode: "Valentine's Day"
2012–2013	The Office	Clark Green	Starring Role (Season 9); 20 episodes
2014	Two and a Half Men	Barry Foster	8 episodes
2015	Mom	Jackie Biletnikoff	2 episodes
2015	Adventure Time	Justin Rockcandy / Jawbreaker Guy	Episode: "The Diary"
2015	SuperMansion	Ganky	Episode: "They Shoot Omega Pets, Don't They?"
2016	Workaholics	Trilly Zane	Episode: "Going Viral"
2017	Room 104	Jarod	Episode: "Pizza Boy"
2017–2018	I'm Dying Up Here	Ron Shack	Main role
2019	Veronica Mars	Don	6 episodes
2021–2022	Inside Job	Brett Hand	Main role
2023	Young Rock	Brian Gewirtz	Episode: "Going Heavy"

Music video
Year	Song	Artist	Notes
2010	Erase Me	Kid Cudi	with Kanye West
2010	Answer to Yourself	The Soft Pack	

== Awards and nominations ==
Year	Award	Category	Nominated work	Result	Ref.
1993	Young Artist Award	Outstanding Actor Under 10 in a Television Series	Hearts Afire	Nominated	
2013	Screen Actors Guild Awards	Outstanding Performance by an Ensemble in a Comedy Series	The Office	Nominated	
2014	Behind the Voice Actors Awards	Best Vocal Ensemble in a Feature Film	The Croods	Nominated	
