= Erase Me (song) =

Single by Kid Cudi featuring Kanye West

from the album Man on the Moon II: The Legend of Mr. Rager
- B-side: "REVOFEV"
- Released: August 17, 2010
- Recorded: 2010
- Genre: Rap rock; alternative rock; power pop
- Length: 3:13
- Label: Dream On; GOOD Music; Universal Motown
- Songwriters: Scott Mescudi; Kanye West; James Scheffer; Frank Romano
- Producer: Jim Jonsin

Kid Cudi singles chronology
"That Tree" (2010)	"Erase Me" (2010)	"Mr. Rager" (2010)

Kanye West singles chronology
"Live Fast, Die Young" (2010)	"Erase Me" (2010)	"Runaway" (2010)

Music video
- "Erase Me" on YouTube

Audio sample
- "Erase Me": file; help

"Erase Me" is a song by American musician Kid Cudi, released August 17, 2010, as the lead single from his second studio album Man on the Moon II: The Legend of Mr. Rager (2010). It features a guest appearance by his mentor, fellow American rapper Kanye West, and was produced by Jim Jonsin. The song proved to be another hit single for Cudi, with the song reaching the top 40 of the US Billboard Hot 100 chart.

== Background and release ==
The song features a guest verse from American rapper and producer Kanye West, who had signed Cudi to his GOOD Music imprint in 2008. The song was produced by high-profile music producer Jim Jonsin, who in 2008 produced two number one hit singles on the Billboard charts; "Lollipop" by Lil Wayne and "Whatever You Like" by T.I. Speaking on the collaboration before its release, Jonsin told Rap-Up.com: "We did one song together, which is kind of rock-influenced. It was something I wanted to do with him and just see where he would go."

Jonsin compared Cudi's blending of sounds to his own Rebel Rock artist B.o.B's genre-bending album The Adventures of Bobby Ray, stating "It's a mix. It's kind of some club stuff, some hip-hop traditional rap stuff, and then some rock-pop stuff. He's goin' everywhere." Cudi later said that Jonsin had misinformed fans about the new album, "I got mad love for Jim but he was misinformed. There is no Kanye & Kid Cudi Duran Duran song, I'd sample a 90s record before a 80s record anyday and when I worked with Jim, I hadn't even started sessions with Plain Pat and Emile yet so the direction of my album was yet to be determined."

The song debuted on a Cleveland radio station on June 30, 2010, and was officially released to Rhythm/Crossover radio on August 17, 2010. On August 24, 2010, "Erase Me" was released digitally via iTunes.

== Music video ==
The music video, directed by Jason Goldwatch, was released on October 11, 2010. In the video, Kid Cudi plays a Jimi Hendrix-influenced character, sporting a black afro wig and a headband. American actors Christopher Mintz-Plasse and Clark Duke make cameo appearances as Cudi's bandmates in the video.

== Remix ==
During a performance in August 2019, Kid Cudi announced that the soundtrack for the film Bill & Ted Face the Music would feature a remix of his 2010 song "Erase Me" produced by Steve Aoki.

== In other media ==
In 2010, Kid Cudi made a guest appearance on American television drama One Tree Hill, starring as himself and performed his Man on the Moon II single "Erase Me", during the episode. In 2011, the song was featured on ESPN's hit morning sports show SportsCenter. In 2015, the song was featured on Guitar Hero Live.

== Legacy ==
In 2020, American pop-punk band Bowling for Soup covered the song, featuring rapper 10k.Caash. It was later featured on their compilation album, Don't Mind If We Do, which released on April 4, 2023.

== Track listing ==
7" Vinyl

A-Side

1. "Erase Me" (featuring Kanye West) - 3:13

B-Side

1. "REVOFEV" - 3:03

== Charts ==
Chart (2010)	Peak position
Australia (ARIA)	50
Austria (Ö3 Austria Top 40)	41
Belgium (Ultratip Bubbling Under Wallonia)	15
Canada (Canadian Hot 100)	12
New Zealand (Recorded Music NZ)	22
Sweden (Sverigetopplistan)	53
UK Singles (Official Charts Company)	58
UK R&B Chart	18
US Billboard Hot 100	22

== Certifications ==
Region	Certification	Certified units/sales
New Zealand (RMNZ)	Platinum	30,000^{‡}
United Kingdom (BPI)	Silver	200,000^{‡}
United States (RIAA)	2× Platinum	2,000,000^{‡}
^{‡} Sales+streaming figures based on certification alone.
