= Further Joy =

Book by John Brandon

- Author: John Brandon
- Language: English
- Genre: Fiction
- Published: 2014, McSweeney's
- Publication place: United States
- Media type: Print, e-book
- Pages: 208 pages
- ISBN: 1938073940
- Preceded by: A Million Heavens

Further Joy is a 2014 short story collection by American author John Brandon. The work, Brandon's first short story collection, was first published on 3 June 2014 through McSweeney's and is composed of eleven short stories.

== Reception ==
Critical reception for Further Joy has been mostly positive, and Publishers Weekly wrote that the collection did not work as well as some of Brandon's earlier works. The Star Tribune echoed this statement, stating that "Not all of the stories in “Further Joy” click: Some end up conveying a mood powerfully well without quite providing a hook; a few read like the aftermath of other stories that were left unwritten. Still, Brandon’s command of resonant frustration and fear is precise." The Boston Globe wrote a mostly favorable review, highlighting The Inland News as the collection's standout story.
