= The Cleaner (2021 film) =

2021 film by Erin Elders

- Directed by: Erin Elders
- Written by: Erin Elders; King Orba
- Produced by: John W. Bosher; Chris Charles; Faust Checho; Kate Grady
- Starring: King Orba; Shelley Long; Eden Brolin; Shiloh Fernandez; Luke Wilson; Lynda Carter
- Cinematography: Jeff Tomcho
- Edited by: Matthew Prekop
- Music by: Brad Oberhofer
- Production companies: Throughline Films; September Club
- Distributed by: 1091 Pictures
- Release date: October 12, 2021
- Running time: 93 minutes
- Country: United States
- Language: English

The Cleaner is a 2021 American crime drama film directed by Erin Elders (in his feature directorial debut), who co-wrote the screenplay with King Orba. It stars Orba in the title role, with Shelley Long, Eden Brolin, Shiloh Fernandez, Luke Wilson, and Lynda Carter in supporting roles. It follows a middle-aged house cleaner who gets caught up in a violent crime after being hired to locate a client's estranged son.

== Cast ==
- King Orba as Buck Enderly
- Shelley Long as Sharon Enderly
- Faust Checho as Craig Enderley
- Eden Brolin as Becky
- Shiloh Fernandez as Andrew Briggs
- Luke Wilson as Jim Russell
- Lynda Carter as Carlene Briggs
- Soleil Moon Frye as Kristi
- Noel Gugliemi as Hector
- M. C. Gainey as Doug
- Mike Starr as Carl
- Milena Govich as Vanessa
- Heather McComb as Laura Russell
- Matty Cardarople as Donny
- Oliver Cooper as Busboy
- James Paxton as James
- Hopper Penn as Trent

== Plot ==
Buck Enderley lives in an area of lower socio-economic housing in Los Angeles with his elderly and frail mother. Their home consists of a cabin for his mother and a stationary RV parked adjacent to the cabin, which Buck sleeps in.

Buck is a former car salesman who now makes a basic income as a house cleaner for wealthy residents in the surrounding suburbs.

Although Buck had initially purchased his RV to undertake road trips across America, he never drives the vehicle and instead uses it as a form of accommodation while utilising a bicycle for his transportation needs.

His brother, Craig Enderley, is a local police officer.

Struggling with the cost of living, Buck is apprehended when he attempts to shoplift from a pharmacy while obtaining medication for his mother.

By chance, Buck's brother, Craig Enderley, is the police officer assigned to speak to Buck about the theft. Craig drives Buck away from the pharmacy but releases him, stating that the owner of the store does not wish to press charges.

Concerned about his finances, Buck revisits the car yard where he had worked as a salesman, but the owner is reluctant to re-hire him.

Buck receives a further blow when he visits the house of a client who informs Buck that he no longer requires Buck’s cleaning services. He lets Buck down gently and suggests that a nearby neighbour, a singer named Carlene Briggs, may require a house cleaner.

Buck pays Carlene a visit, where he notices that her house is spotlessly clean. When he suggests that she may not require the services of a cleaner, Carlene confides that what she really needs is someone to track down her missing son, Andrew.

Carlene explains that in the past Andrew would visit her when he needed financial help, but she informs Buck that she has not seen her son for some time.

Needing income, Buck agrees to help Carlene to find Andrew when she offers him an immediate up-front payment of $1000.

Buck begins making inquiries in the local area, including at a local diner. The owner, Carl, states that Andrew had been working in the diner as a cook but simply stopped showing up one day after collecting a paycheck.

Buck also learns that Andrew is on the verge of being evicted from his apartment because he has not paid any rent for three months.

When Buck receives no answer at the door of Andrew’s apartment, he enlists the aid of his police officer brother to enter the apartment and look for clues.

Although they find little helpful evidence inside Andrew’s apartment, Buck notices that Andrew’s stereo contains a tape recording of his mother singing.

A young employee of the diner where Andrew had worked recommends that Buck try locating him through a local bar that Andrew was known to be a regular at.

Buck keeps Carlene informed of his progress but expresses his view that he may not be suited to doing a missing persons investigation.

Buck’s concerns about getting involved in the case are further heightened when Craig warns him that he has run a police background check on Andrew and found some serious criminal offences to his name.

However, Carlene once again entices Buck by paying him a further sum, this time $2000, which Buck claims is too much for his services.

Carlene confides that the real reason she is desperate to repair her relationship with her son is because she has a tumour-related medical condition and may not live long.

Learning that Andrew is a car owner, Buck visits a local auto repair shop and speaks to an attendant named Hector.

Hector informs Buck that Andrew has occasionally dropped by with his car.

Hector claims that he has little information on Andrew as he does not “keep tabs” on people. Buck leaves his business card with Hector to pass onto Andrew in the hope that he may call.

Shortly after, Buck is taken by surprise when Andrew phones him out of the blue. They arrange to meet at the diner where Andrew had previously been a cook.

Buck arrives and orders food to go, which he intends to take back to his mother after the meeting. When Andrew walks in, Buck explains that Carlene is gravely ill and would like to patch things up between them while there is still time.

Andrew states that he would not be interested in a reunion due to the parenting he received from Carlene and his stepfather.

Buck counters this by asking Andrew why he had a tape recording of his mother in his apartment, but Andrew terminates the meeting and walks out.

After Andrew leaves, Buck visits the mens room, informing Carl that he will be ready to receive his food order after the bathroom break.

Acting impulsively, Andrew re-enters the diner with a pistol and demands that Carl give him the takings from the cash register.

In the lavatory, Buck hears gunshots ring out as Andrew and an armed patron of the diner create a dangerous crossfire situation.

When the shooting dies down, Buck cautiously re-enters the dining room and discovers that Andrew, the patron, Carl and his staff member are all dead. Buck retrieves his takeaway order and leaves discretely.

The following day, Craig visits Buck and asks where Buck had been the night before and where he had eaten.

Suspecting that Buck may be hiding something, Craig warns Buck that police crime scene investigations are very thorough.

With Craig’s help, Buck visits the local police station to inform them that he had been inside the diner during the robbery and shooting.

After explaining what happened, Buck is found to have committed no wrongdoing and is let go by police. He uses his newfound sense of freedom to embark in his RV on a road trip to Niagara Falls with his mother.

== Release ==
On August 12, 2021, it was announced that 1091 Pictures acquired U.S. distribution rights to the film. It was released on digital and on demand on October 12, 2021.

== Reception ==
=== Critical response ===
On the review aggregator website Rotten Tomatoes, 83% of 6 critics' reviews are positive, with an average rating of 7.3/10.

Brian Costello of Common Sense Media gave the film 4 stars out of 5 and stated, "The Cleaner reveals once again that solid acting, relatable characters, and a good story can do so much more on a limited budget than a blockbuster movie with a weak story and cliched characters." Roger Moore of Movie Nation gave it 2.5 stars out of 4 and wrote, "It's not a polished jewel, but even in the rough The Cleaner shines, more proof that you don't need to limit yourself to horror to get your first film made." Dennis Schwartz gave the film a grade of B−, calling it "a knucklehead indie noir that's not too good but avoids being bad."

On the other hand, Carla Hay of Culture Mix gave The Cleaner a negative review, describing it as "a ridiculous mess of a story with terrible dialogue, lousy acting and uneven pacing." Hay also noted that "the ending is so cliché" and "it's not enough to cover up all the loose ends and unnecessary scenes that make the movie an insufferable, tangled mess."
