= 10k.Caash =

American rapper and dancer

- Born: Treyvon Britt; February 15, 2001 (age 25); Dallas, Texas, U.S.
- Genres: Dance-rap
- Occupations: Rapper; dancer
- Instrument: Vocals
- Years active: 2015–present
- Label: Def Jam

Treyvon Britt (born February 15, 2001), known professionally as 10k.Caash, is an American rapper and dancer. Hailing from the Oak Cliff neighborhood of Dallas, Texas, he became known in 2018 for performing "the Woah", a dance move that went viral online in 2018 and which he has been credited with creating. After signing to Def Jam Recordings in 2018, he released his debut mixtape, The Creator (2018). Its single "Aloha" went viral online the following year, particularly on Dubsmash and Instagram. He released his second mixtape, Planet Swajjur, in 2020.

== Career ==
Treyvon Britt was born in Dallas, Texas, and raised in its Oak Cliff neighborhood. He played football in high school as a defensive tackle, but he did not graduate. He had begun studying accounting at Texas A&M University–Commerce by 2020.

10k.Caash was a member of the Rollie Bros, a Dallas–based dance group who created the "Rollie" dance in 2015. 10k.Caash became known for being one of the originators of "the Woah", a viral dance move which Nadine Smith of Pitchfork described as a "descendant of the Dougie". Videos of him doing the dance, including on Triller, became popular in the summer of 2018 and received millions of views online. A Triller video of him doing the dance with rapper Lil Uzi Vert became popular on Instagram in the summer of 2018 and helped to popularize it.

At the suggestion of Lil Uzi Vert, 10k.Caash started rapping professionally in July 2018. That summer, he released his debut single, "Dip Swag Dip". In November of that year, he released his debut mixtape, The Creator—whose title and cover art were based around his assertion that he had invented the Woah—on SoundCloud, and signed to Def Jam Recordings soon after. The mixtape included features from rappers Matt Ox, Rico Nasty, Riff Raff, Famous Dex, Asian Doll, and Lil Yachty, and was released to streaming services by Def Jam in May 2019. Jon Caramanica listed it as the tenth best album of 2019 for The New York Times. Its song "Aloha", which was produced by Kenny Beats and featured rapper G.U.N, went viral online in early 2019 due to being used in a dance challenge on Dubsmash and Instagram, which was created by influencers Laila Wiggins and Antonio Willis in January of that year. It was released as a single by Def Jam on streaming services that March and its music video was released that May. It also appeared in the fifth season of the HBO series Ballers. 10k.Caash's song "Kerwin Frost Scratch That" became popular on TikTok, appearing in more than one and a half million videos on the platform by May 2019, when it was also released as a single. 10k.Caash's Christmas extended play (EP), Ho Ho Ho, was released in December 2018. According to Winston Cook-Wilson of Spin, 10k.Caash was "widely co-signed" by April 2019. Throughout 2019, he performed as an opening act for ASAP Rocky; with Trippie Redd during Astroworld Festival; and at the JMBLYA music festival in May. He became artist management company Inertia Management's inaugural client upon their launch in November 2019.

10k.Caash released the album Planet Swajjur in February 2020, which featured rappers Chance the Rapper, TisaKorean, Gun40, TyFontaine, Sexton, Young Jordan, and Zoey Dollaz. He was part of the lineup for the livestreamed Music Lives benefit concert in April 2020, the proceeds of which went toward the MusiCares COVID-19 Relief Fund. His studio album Left Alone was released the following month. He was featured on Bowling for Soup's cover of the 2010 Kid Cudi song "Erase Me", which was released in June 2020 and on which he performed Kanye West's verse. He released his studio album 10K in January 2022 and appeared on record producer Jimmy Edgar's studio album Liquids Heavens, released in September 2022.

== Musical style ==
For The New York Times, Jon Caramanica wrote in 2020 that 10k.Caash rapped "as if he was learning to rap without knowing that rap music already existed" and described his "exceedingly short" songs as being "near the intersection of songcraft, dance clips, buzzy video and Foley art" and as "quasi-nonsensical, punk space-rap redolent of the early, rowdy Beastie Boys". In a 2020 review of his mixtape Planet Swajjur, Smith wrote for Pitchfork that 10k.Caash's "bite-sized" songs were "designed with virality in mind" and likened his "sound and presentation" to that of Soulja Boy. Alphonse Pierre, also writing for Pitchfork, called 10k.Caash the "spiritual successor" of Soulja Boy and wrote that his "dance rap" songs had "minimalist", "catchy, rudimentary", and "bass-heavy" production and "lyrics that could be pantomimed". Jordan Darville of The Fader described his music as "dance-rap" and compared his "yelped" flow to that of fellow rapper Ugly God.

== Discography ==
=== Studio albums ===
List of studio albums, with release date and label shown
Title	Details
Planet Swajjur	Released: January 31, 2020; Label: Def Jam; Format: Digital download, streaming
Public Announcement	Released: February 16, 2021; Label: Self-released; Format: Digital download, streaming
10k	Released: January 15, 2022; Label: Self-released; Format: Digital download, streaming
Bitch!	Released: September 1, 2024; Label: Self-released; Format: Digital download, streaming
SwajjurStyles Vol. 1	Released: November 15, 2024; Label: Self-released; Format: Digital download, streaming
Rachet Party Music	Released: April 25, 2025; Label: Self-released; Format: Digital download, streaming
Final Exam	Released: May 16, 2025; Label: Self-released; Format: Digital download, streaming
Rachet Party Music 2	Released: July 4, 2025; Label: Self-released; Format: Digital download, streaming

=== Mixtapes ===
List of mixtapes, with release date and label shown
Title	Details
The Creator	Released: May 10, 2019; Label: Def Jam; Format: Digital download, streaming
Freshman Year	Released: September 19, 2020; Label: Self-released; Format: Digital download, streaming
The Guy with the Swajjur the Bag and the Cash and If You Ain't Swaggin' This Ain't for You	Released: April 1, 2022; Label: Self-released; Format: Digital download, streaming

=== Extended plays ===
List of extended plays, with release date and label shown
Title	Details
Ho Ho Ho	Released: December 25, 2018; Label: Def Jam; Format: Digital download, streaming
Scary Swajjur Stories	Released: December 25, 2018; Label: Self-released; Format: Digital download, streaming
Bag Pack	Released: January 10, 2022; Label: Self-released; Format: Digital download, streaming
Lit	Released: February 15, 2024; Label: Self-released; Format: Digital download, streaming
I Forgot I Was a Star	Released: December 13, 2024; Label: Self-released; Format: Digital download, streaming
Planet Swajjur 2	Released: November 14, 2025; Label: Self-released; Format: Digital download, streaming

=== Singles ===
==== As lead artist ====
List of singles as lead artist, showing year released and album name
Title	Year	Album
"On Go Freestyle" (with FKi 1st and G.U.N)	2018	Good Gas (Vol. 3)
"Aloha" (featuring G.U.N)	2019	The Creator
"Geek It Up" (with G.U.N)	2019	—N/a
"Kerwin Frost Scratch That" (featuring Matt Ox)	2019	The Creator
"SwajjurKicks" (featuring Lil Yachty)	2019	Ho Ho Ho
"Let's Go" (with Lex Luger and Santana)	2020	—N/a
"Mulberry Street"	2020	—N/a
"Swag"	2020	—N/a
"Left Knee" (with Farrow Miyagi)	2020	Freshman Year
"Solitude"	2020	—N/a
"Whatchu Do"	2021	Public Announcement
"I'm the Bomb"	2023	—N/a
"Pussy"	2023	—N/a
"Shag on My Head"	2024	—N/a
"Boogie Part 2"	2024	—N/a
"You and Me (No Hook)"	2024	—N/a
"Back to the Woah" (with JhonnieDamnD)	2024	The Day Hell Broke Loose
"Holy Moly"	2024	—N/a
"Top Shottah" (featuring Cliffsidebam)	2024	—N/a
"Pop and Wock!" (with KidinPJs)	2024	—N/a
"Hydraulic"	2024	—N/a
"Zombie Rock"	2024	—N/a
"You Better Move" (with Miles McCoy)	2024	Using My Voice +
"Bounce!" (with Big Faybo)	2024	—N/a
"See You Do It" (with Kblast)	2024	—N/a
"Damn BYB" (with Big Legend)	2025	Rachet Party Music
"18 Wheeler (I'm So Loaded)"	2025	—N/a
"Beauty and Beast"	2025	—N/a
"Make Me Sick" (with Danny Towers)	2025	—N/a
"Keep It Jumpin" (with Dorrough Music)	2025	—N/a
"Boogieland" (with Jhonniedamnd and BbyJhn)	2025	—N/a
"Wobble Walk" (with Gun40)	2025	—N/a
"Better Work" (with WtfAyinde and 414BigFrank)	2025	—N/a
"On the River"	2025	—N/a
"Shake That Ahhh"	2025	—N/a
"Move"	2025	—N/a
"Grown Folks" (with 1TakeJay)	2025	—N/a
"Bend Over"	2025	—N/a

==== As featured artist ====
List of singles as featured artist, showing year released and album name
Title	Year	Album
"Protect My Life" (1TakeJay featuring 10k.Caash)	2019	—N/a
"Super Sauce" (WhooKilledKenny featuring 10k.Caash and G.U.N)	2019	—N/a
"Watch Me" (Bouba Savage featuring 10k.Caash)	2019	—N/a
"Erase Me" (Bowling for Soup featuring 10k.Caash)	2020	Don't Mind If We Do
"Walkin'" (YehMe2 featuring 10k.Caash)	2021	Non-album singles
"Heelys" (DereckBruh featuring 10k.Caash)	2021	Non-album singles
"Everybody" (Jimmy Edgar featuring 10k.Caash and Zelooperz)	2022	Liquids Heaven
"Shag on My Head" (Yung Nation featuring 10k.Caash and Fooly Faime)	2024	Non-album singles
"Back to the Woah Part 2" (JhonnieDamnD featuring 10k.Caash, TisaKorean and Young Deji)	2025	Non-album singles

=== Guest appearances ===
Title	Year	Artist(s)	Album
"Apple Juice"	2019	TisaKorean, Kenny Beats	A Guide to Being a Partying Freshman
"Samsung!"	2019	Joost	1983
"Who He"	2019	Danny Towers	Tarantula
"Beep Beep"	2020	Oro Bianco	No Label
"Txt"	2020	TyFontaine	Virtual World
"Collateral Damage"	2021	Social Ice	Now Until Forevermore
"Good Morning"	2022	Drippy Denton	Drippy Dallas
"War"	2022	Soski	Beast Boy
"Spit On"	2022	Gutta TV	You Gone Be Big
"YabbaDabba Wop"	2022	FreshDuzIt	Land Before Rhyme
"High Fashion"	2023	Yung Bambi	Bexar County Club
"Mattress Giant"	2023	Yung Nation	Nation or Nothing Vol. 2
"I Got Kash"	2024	Will Kidd, Lul Reckless	I Hate Yaw
