= A Million Heavens =

2012 novel by John Brandon

- First edition hardback cover
- Author: John Brandon
- Language: English
- Genre: Fiction
- Published: 2012, McSweeney's
- Publication place: United States
- Media type: Print, e-book, audiobook
- Pages: 272 pages
- ISBN: 1936365731
- Preceded by: Citrus County
- Followed by: Further Joy

A Million Heavens is a 2012 novel by John Brandon. The book was first published on 3 July 2012 by McSweeney's and is Brandon's third novel, following his 2010 book Citrus County.

== Synopsis ==
The novel follows several different characters as they congregate in the parking lot of a clinic where a child prodigy has fallen into a coma. They each have their own issues, the foster child, the divorcee, and the gas station owner, and all of whom have decided to gather to hold a vigil for the coma patient.

== Reception ==
Critical reception for A Million Heavens has been mostly positive and the work has received praise from Publishers Weekly, The Daily Beast, and the Atlanta Journal-Constitution. The Plain Dealer commented that the work was dissimilar to Brandon's earlier works, as it was not as dark as Citrus County or Arkansas and took more of a leisurely pace in its storytelling. The Oxford American commented on the book's themes of loss and tragedy, writing "Life doesn’t go back to normal, but life goes on. The most profound part of this novel is that it’s satisfying, even without a tangible or dramatic conclusion for the majority of the characters." Charles Bock also reviewed the work, criticizing it for having "Too many sentences [that] tap a bit too deeply into New Mexico’s mystical, new-agey chakra, crossing the line from sincere to earnest (“The wolf wanted to believe that every last hope for peace had not expired in him”), or from earnest to precious (“He was a single note and he only wanted to ring”)" while stating that is ultimately "nothing more — or less — than a sweet ride, smooth traveling for both the mind and heart."
