= Danielle Brooks =

American actress (born 1989)

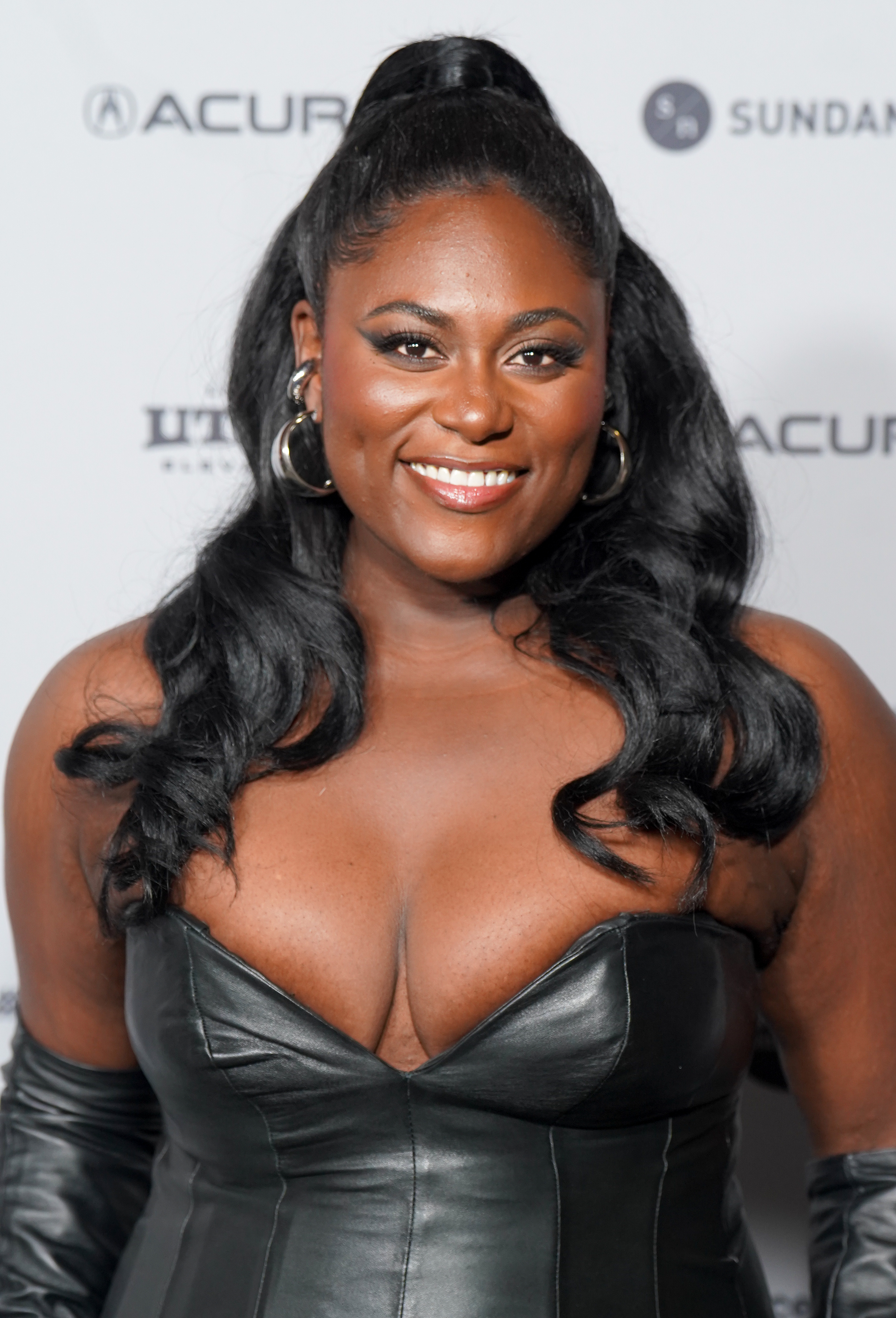
- Brooks at the 2026 Sundance Film Festival
- Born: September 17, 1989 (age 37); Augusta, Georgia, U.S.
- Education: Juilliard School (BFA)
- Occupation: Actress
- Years active: 2009–present
- Spouse: Dennis Gelin (m. 2022)
- Children: 1

Danielle Brooks (born September 17, 1989) is an American actress. After studying drama at the Juilliard School she earned her breakthrough in television before expanding to theater and film. She has received a Grammy Award as well as nominations for an Academy Award, a British Academy Film Award, two Emmy Awards, and a Tony Award.

Her breakthrough role was as prison inmate Tasha "Taystee" Jefferson in the Netflix comedy-drama series Orange Is the New Black (2013–2019). She made her Broadway debut as Sofia in the musical revival of The Color Purple (2015), earning a nomination for a Tony Award as well as a Grammy Award. She reprised her role in the 2023 film adaptation for which she was nominated for an Academy Award, British Academy Film Award, and Golden Globe Award. She played the title role in the Lifetime film Robin Roberts Presents: Mahalia (2021) earning a nomination for a Primetime Emmy Award as an executive producer.

In 2022, Brooks hosted Netflix's reality series Instant Dream Home and was nominated for a Daytime Emmy Award for Outstanding Daytime Program Host. The same year, Brooks starred in the superhero series Peacemaker (2022–2025), and returned to Broadway in the revival of the August Wilson play The Piano Lesson, for which she received a Drama Desk Award nomination. She is also known for her recurring role in the Netflix comedy series Master of None (2015–2017) and her role in the adventure comedy film A Minecraft Movie (2025).

== Early life and education ==
Brooks was born on September 17, 1989, in Augusta, Georgia, and grew up in Simpsonville, South Carolina, in a Christian family. Her father Dunnel is a BMW worker and a deacon and her mother LaRita is a teacher and a minister. She began acting at the age of six in a nativity play put on by her church. For her final two years of high school, she attended South Carolina Governor's School for the Arts & Humanities, a selective arts high school. She is a 2007 YoungArts alumnus. She studied drama at the Juilliard School and graduated in 2011 with a Bachelor of Fine Arts.

== Career ==
=== 2013–2019: Breakthrough ===
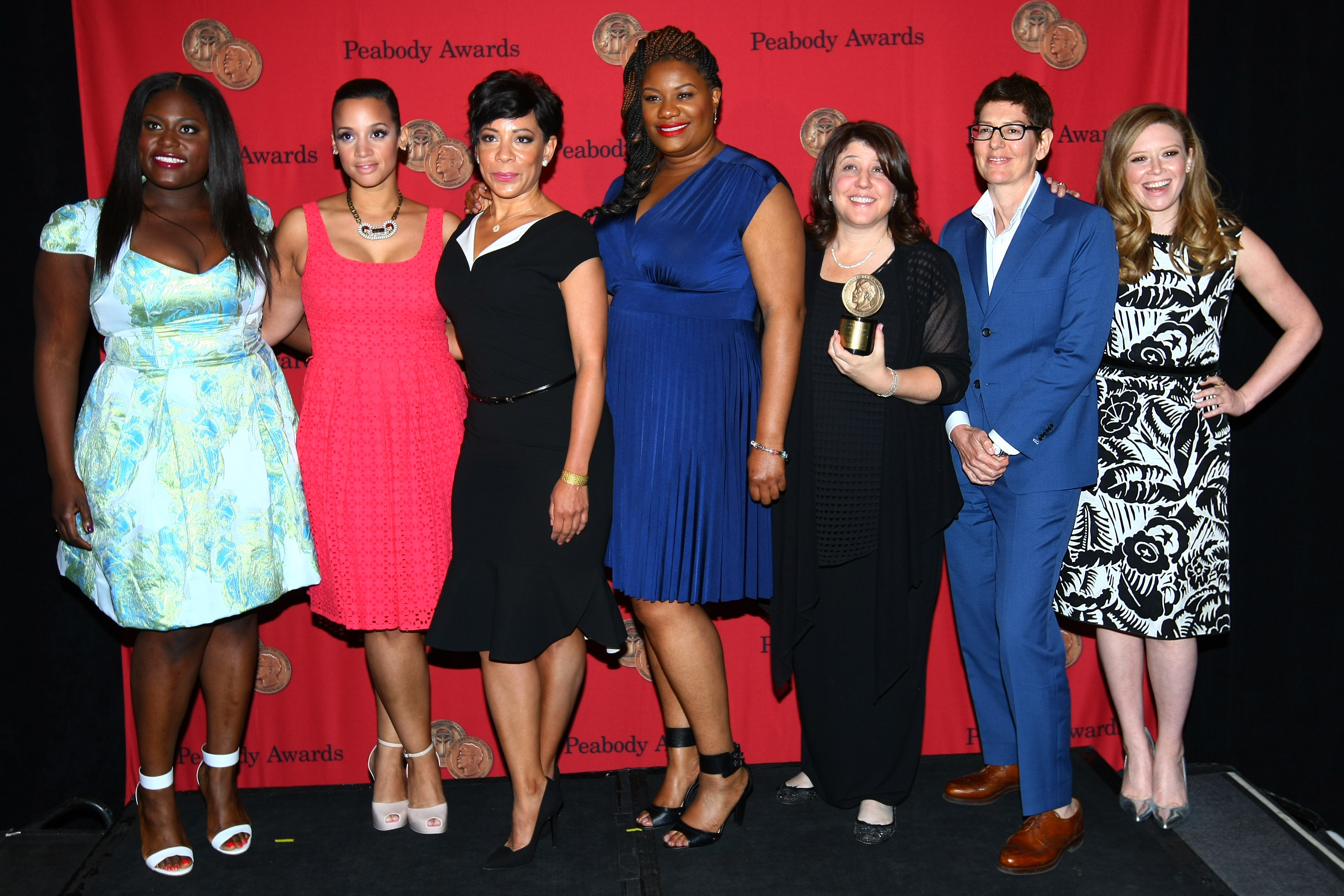
Brooks with the cast of Orange is the New Black in 2014

After graduating from Juilliard, Brooks won roles in two theater productions: the Shakespeare Theatre Company's Servant of Two Masters, and Blacken the Bubble. She left both productions in 2013 to join the cast of the Netflix-produced television series Orange Is the New Black, a show about a women's prison, based on Piper Kerman's memoir of the same name. Brooks played as Tasha "Taystee" Jefferson. Her character originally was intended to be featured in the show for only two episodes, but was written into the rest of the first season and subsequent seasons. While starring in the show, Brooks still worked a second job due to a low salary. In an interview with The New Yorker she said that she was paid less on the final season than the lead child actors made that same year on Stranger Things. Taystee's onscreen best friend Poussey is played by Samira Wiley, with whom Brooks has been friends since they met while studying together at Juilliard.

Brooks' performance on the show has been favorably reviewed by TV critics, with one writer calling her "the breakout actress of the show and one of the most refreshing and exciting new talents of 2013." Brooks was upgraded from a recurring cast member to a series regular for the show's second season. For her performance, Brooks received three NAACP Image Awards nominations; one for Outstanding Supporting Actress in a Comedy Series in 2016, and two for Outstanding Actress in a Comedy Series. She also received the 2014 Young Hollywood Awards for Breakthrough and three Screen Actors Guild Award for Outstanding Performance by an Ensemble in a Comedy Series.

In September 2013, Brooks was cast in a third-season episode of the HBO series Girls, becoming the first African-American actress on the show. The following year she made her big screen debut appearing in the drama film Time Out of Mind. In 2015 she starred in the comedy-drama film I Dream Too Much. From 2015 to 2017 she also appeared in Netflix series Master of None. She competed against co-star Uzo Aduba in an episode of Spike's Lip Sync Battle that aired on June 28, 2017. Brooks won with performances of Ciara's "1, 2 Step" and Bon Jovi's "Livin' on a Prayer". She has done voice-over work in the 2016 animated feature The Angry Birds Movie and later appeared in the films Sadie (2018), Clemency (2019) and The Day Shall Come (2019).

Brooks made her Broadway debut in the 2015 revival of The Color Purple as Sofia alongside Jennifer Hudson and Cynthia Erivo. The musical opened on December 10, 2015, at the Bernard B. Jacobs. Brooks received good reviews for her performance, and received a nomination for the Tony Award for Best Featured Actress in a Musical. In June 2019, she played Beatrice in The Public Theater's production of Much Ado About Nothing, receiving a Drama League Award nomination for her performance. Also in 2019, Brooks recorded her first single titled "Black Woman".

=== 2020–present ===
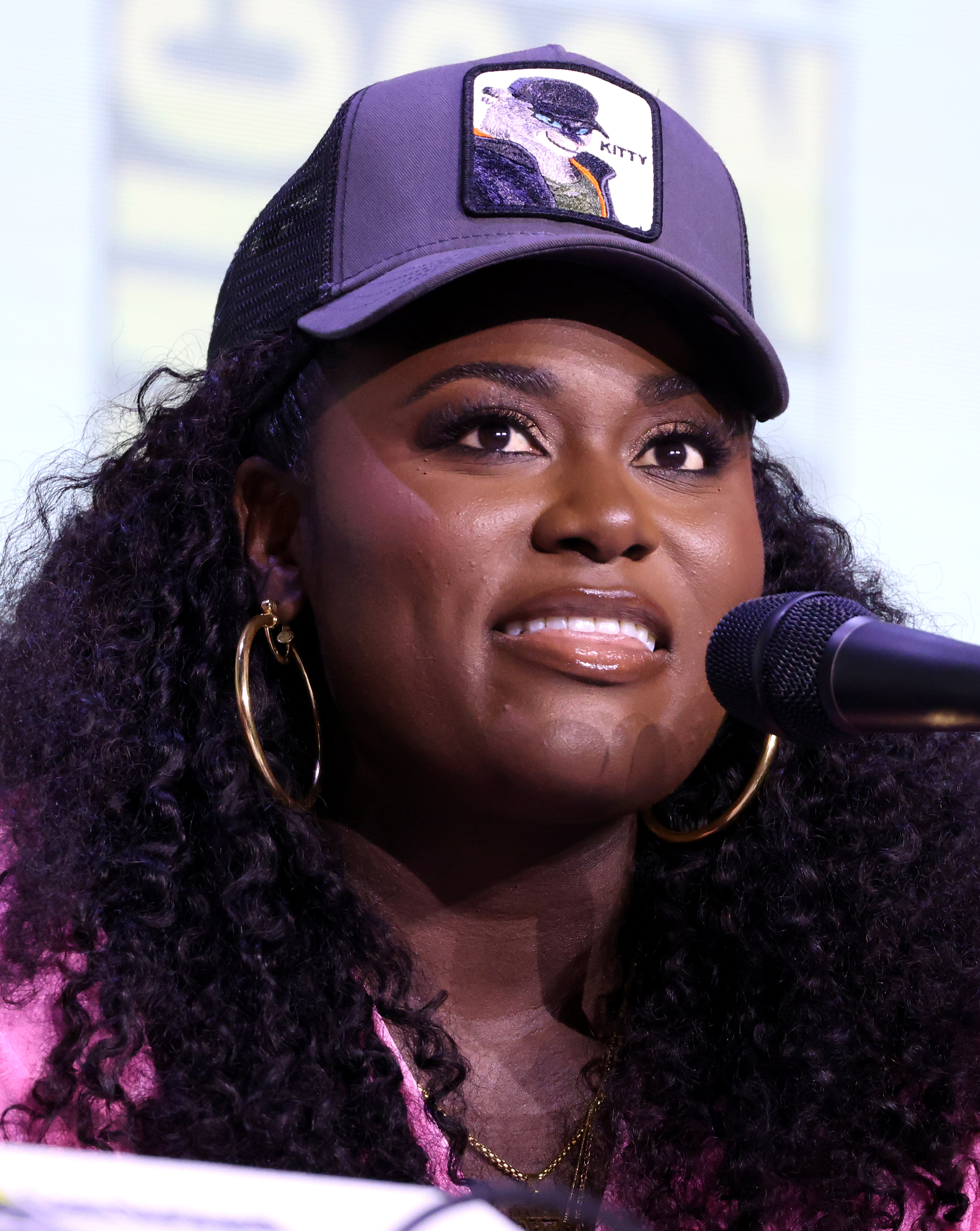
Brooks at the 2025 San Diego Comic-Con

In 2020, Brooks co-starred opposite Tony Hale in the comedy film Eat Wheaties!. In 2021 she played gospel singer Mahalia Jackson in the made-for-television biographical film Robin Roberts Presents: Mahalia, for which she received nominations for Critics' Choice Awards, Satellite Awards, and NAACP Image Award for Outstanding Actress in a Television Movie, Mini-Series or Dramatic Special, and an Primetime Emmy Award for Outstanding Television Movie as an executive producer. From 2021 to 2022, Brooks voiced Lillie Carter-Grant, mother of protagonist Karma and doctor, in the animated series Karma's World. In 2022, Brooks was cast in James Gunn's Max superhero series Peacemaker playing the role of Leota Adebayo, Amanda Waller's (Viola Davis) daughter. The series is a spin-off of Gunn's film The Suicide Squad (2021) and is the first television series to be included in the DCEU. In a 2022 interview, Brooks revealed that Gunn was a big fan of Orange Is the New Black and wrote the part of Adebayo with her in mind. The role gained her a Saturn Award for Best Supporting Actress on Television nomination in 2022.

In 2022, Brooks starred as Berniece in a Broadway revival of August Wilson's The Piano Lesson starting on September 19, 2022, directed by LaTanya Richardson Jackson; the production received mixed reviews from critics. Brooks received a Drama Desk Award for Outstanding Featured Actress in a Play nomination for her performance. In 2022, Brooks also hosted the Netflix reality series Instant Dream Home and was nominated for a Daytime Emmy Award for Outstanding Daytime Program Host.

In 2023, Brooks starred in The Color Purple, a feature adaptation of the musical of the same name, directed by Blitz Bazawule. She received positive reviews for her performance. Film critic Peyton Robinson from RogerEbert.com wrote in her review: "Brooks, Tony-nominated for her onstage depiction, is the film's no-holds-barred knockout, giving an undeniably crowd-pleasing performance. Her charismatic presence is spellbinding, and her emotional dexterity in covering the full spectrum of affectations, from tear-jerking to side-splitting, is a joy to witness. Sofia is heralded for her refusal to be ignored, underestimated, or disrespected, and Brooks' performance demands the same." Alissa Wilkinson from The New York Times called her "incredible", while Ella Kemp from Evening Standard wrote: "Brooks' star power is infectious". The performance gained her nominations for an Academy Award, British Academy Film Award, and Golden Globe Award for Best Supporting Actress.

Brooks appeared in A Minecraft Movie and voiced the main antagonist Kitty Kat in The Bad Guys 2.

== Personal life ==
On July 2, 2019, Brooks announced that she was pregnant with her first child. In November, she gave birth to a girl, Freeya. She married Dennis Gelin in January 2022 in Miami, Florida.

On July 9, 2025, Brooks became an honorary member of Delta Sigma Theta sorority.

== Filmography ==
Key
†	Denotes films that have not yet been released

=== Film ===
Year	Title	Role	Notes	Ref(s)
2014	Time Out of Mind	Receptionist		
2015	I Dream Too Much	Abbey		
2015	Phenomenal Woman, a Short Film	Woman	Short film	
2016	The Angry Birds Movie	Olive Blue/Monica the Crossing Guard (voice)	First voice role	
2018	Sadie	Carla		
2019	Clemency	Evette		
2019	The Day Shall Come	Venus		
2019	The Public's Much Ado About Nothing	Beatrice	Filmed production	
2019	All the Little Things We Kill	Claire Soto		
2020	Eat Wheaties!	Wendy		
2023	The Color Purple	Sofia		
2025	A Minecraft Movie	Dawn		
2025	The Bad Guys 2	Kitty Kat (voice)		
2025	Oh. What. Fun.	Morgan		
2026	If I Go Will They Miss Me	Lozita		
2026	Bad Day †	TBA	Filming	
2027	A Minecraft Movie Squared †	Dawn	Filming	

=== Television ===
Year	Title	Role	Notes
2012	Modern Love	Raimy	TV movie
2013	Black Girls Rock! 2013	Herself	TV movie
2013–2019	Orange Is the New Black	Tasha "Taystee" Jefferson	Main role, 89 episodes
2014	Girls	Laura	Episode: "Females Only"
2015–2017	Master of None	Shannon	3 episodes
2017	Tangled: The Series	Ruthless Ruth (voice)	Episode: "The Wrath of Ruthless Ruth"
2017	Lip Sync Battle	Herself	Episode: "Danielle Brooks vs. Uzo Aduba"
2018	Project Runway All Stars	Herself	Episode: "Damsels in Distress"
2018	High Maintenance	Regine	Episode: "Namaste"
2018	Elena of Avalor	Charica (voice)	Episode: "A Lava Story"
2020–2022	Close Enough	Pearle Watson (voice)	Recurring role (season 1); main (season 2)
2020	Social Distance	Imani	Episode: "And We Could All Together/Go Out on the Ocean"
2020	Sarah Cooper: Everything's Fine	Jordana Bachman	TV special
2021	Robin Roberts Presents: Mahalia	Mahalia Jackson	TV movie; also co-executive producer
2021–2022	Karma's World	Dr. Lillie Carter-Grant (voice)	10 episodes
2022–2025	Peacemaker	Leota Waller Adebayo	Main role, 15 episodes
2022	Instant Dream Home	Host	8 episodes

=== Video games ===
Year	Title	Role	Notes
2025	Minecraft	Dawn	A Minecraft Movie live event

=== Theatre ===
Year	Title	Role	Notes
2015–2017	The Color Purple	Sofia	Bernard B. Jacobs Theatre, Broadway
2019	Much Ado About Nothing	Beatrice	Delacorte Theater, Off-Broadway
2022–2023	The Piano Lesson	Berniece	St. James Theatre, Broadway
2027	You're a Good Man, Charlie Brown	Lucy van Pelt	New York City Center, Off-Broadway

== Awards and nominations ==
List of awards and nominations received by Danielle Brooks
Award	Year	Category	Nominated work	Result	Ref.
Academy Awards	2024	Best Supporting Actress	The Color Purple	Nominated	
Alliance of Women Film Journalists	2024	Best Actress in a Supporting Role	The Color Purple	Nominated	
African-American Film Critics Association Awards	2024	Best Supporting Actress	The Color Purple	Won	
African-American Film Critics Association Awards	2024	Best Ensemble	The Color Purple	Won	
Astra Film and Creative Awards	2024	Breakthrough Performer Award	Herself	Won	
Astra Film and Creative Awards	2024	Best Supporting Actress	The Color Purple	Nominated	
Astra Film and Creative Awards	2024	Best Cast Ensemble	The Color Purple	Won	
Austin Film Critics Association Awards	2024	Best Actress in a Supporting Role	The Color Purple	Nominated	
Celebration of Cinema and Television	2023	Ensemble Award – Film	The Color Purple	Won	
BAFTA Film Awards	2024	Best Actress in a Supporting Role	The Color Purple	Nominated	
Black Reel Awards	2024	Outstanding Supporting Performance	The Color Purple	Won	
Black Reel Awards	2024	Outstanding Breakthrough Performance	The Color Purple	Nominated	
Black Reel Awards	2026	Outstanding Voice Performance	The Bad Guys 2	Nominated	
Critics' Choice Movie Awards	2024	Best Supporting Actress	The Color Purple	Nominated	
Critics' Choice Movie Awards	2024	Best Acting Ensemble	The Color Purple	Nominated	
Critics' Choice Television Awards	2022	Best Actress in a Limited Series or Movie Made for Television	Robin Roberts Presents: Mahalia	Nominated	
Critics' Choice Television Awards	2026	Best Supporting Actress in a Comedy Series	Peacemaker	Nominated	
Critics' Choice Super Awards	2023	Best Actress in a Superhero Series, Limited Series or TV Movie	Peacemaker	Nominated	
Dallas–Fort Worth Film Critics Association	2023	Best Supporting Actress	The Color Purple	2nd place	
Daytime Emmy Awards	2023	Outstanding Daytime Program Host	Instant Dream Home	Nominated	
Drama Desk Award	2016	Outstanding Featured Actress in a Musical	The Color Purple	Nominated	
Drama Desk Award	2023	Outstanding Featured Performance in a Play	The Piano Lesson	Nominated	
Drama League Award	2020	Distinguished Performance	Much Ado About Nothing	Nominated	
Drama League Award	2023	Distinguished Performance	The Piano Lesson	Nominated	
Georgia Film Critics Association Awards	2024	Best Supporting Actress	The Color Purple	Nominated	
Georgia Film Critics Association Awards	2024	Best Ensemble	The Color Purple	Nominated	
Golden Globe Awards	2024	Best Supporting Actress – Motion Picture	The Color Purple	Nominated	
Grammy Awards	2017	Best Musical Theater Album	The Color Purple	Won	
Houston Film Critics Society Awards	2024	Best Supporting Actress	The Color Purple	Nominated	
NAACP Image Awards	2016	Outstanding Actress in a Comedy Series	Orange Is the New Black	Nominated	
NAACP Image Awards	2018	Outstanding Actress in a Comedy Series	Orange Is the New Black	Nominated	
NAACP Image Awards	2019	Outstanding Actress in a Comedy Series	Orange Is the New Black	Nominated	
NAACP Image Awards	2022	Outstanding Actress in a Limited Series, Movie or Special	Robin Roberts Presents: Mahalia	Nominated	
NAACP Image Awards	2024	Outstanding Supporting Actress	The Color Purple	Nominated	
NAACP Image Awards	2024	Outstanding Ensemble Cast in a Motion Picture	The Color Purple	Won	
NAACP Image Awards	2026	Outstanding Character Voice Performance – Motion Picture	The Bad Guys 2	Nominated	
Outer Critics Circle Award	2016	Outstanding Featured Actress in a Musical	The Color Purple	Nominated	
Palm Springs International Film Festival	2023	Spotlight Award, actress	Herself	Won	
People's Choice Awards	2024	The Movie Performance of the Year	The Color Purple	Nominated	
Primetime Emmy Award	2021	Outstanding Television Movie	Robin Roberts Presents: Mahalia	Nominated	
Santa Barbara International Film Festival	2024	Virtuoso Award	The Color Purple	Won	
Satellite Awards	2018	Best Actress in a Supporting Role in a Series, Miniseries or TV Movie	Orange Is the New Black	Nominated	
Satellite Awards	2022	Best Actress in a Miniseries, Limited Series or TV Movie	Robin Roberts Presents: Mahalia	Nominated	
Saturn Awards	2022	Best Supporting Actress in a Streaming Series	Peacemaker	Nominated	
Screen Actors Guild Awards	2014	Outstanding Ensemble in a Comedy Series	Orange Is the New Black	Won	
Screen Actors Guild Awards	2015	Outstanding Ensemble in a Comedy Series	Orange Is the New Black	Won	
Screen Actors Guild Awards	2016	Outstanding Ensemble in a Comedy Series	Orange Is the New Black	Won	
Screen Actors Guild Awards	2017	Outstanding Ensemble in a Comedy Series	Orange Is the New Black	Nominated	
Screen Actors Guild Awards	2024	Outstanding Performance by a Female Actor in a Supporting Role	The Color Purple	Nominated	
Screen Actors Guild Awards	2024	Outstanding Performance by a Cast in a Motion Picture	The Color Purple	Nominated	
Seattle Film Critics Society Awards	2024	Best Actress in a Supporting Role	The Color Purple	Nominated	
Theatre World Award	2016	Herself		Honoree	
Tony Awards	2016	Best Featured Actress in a Musical	The Color Purple	Nominated	
Young Hollywood Award	2013	Breakthrough Actress	Orange Is the New Black	Won	
Washington D.C. Area Film Critics Association Awards	2023	Best Supporting Actress	The Color Purple	Nominated	
Women Film Critics Circle Awards	2023	Best Supporting Actress	The Color Purple	Nominated	

== See also ==
- African-American Tony nominees and winners
