= Citrus County (novel) =

2010 novel by John Brandon

- First edition hardback cover
- Author: John Brandon
- Language: English
- Genre: Fiction
- Published: 2010, McSweeney's
- Publication place: United States
- Media type: Print, e-book, audiobook
- Pages: 224 pages
- ISBN: 1934781533
- Preceded by: Arkansas
- Followed by: A Million Heavens

Citrus County is the second novel by American author John Brandon, following his debut novel Arkansas. It was published on 6 July 2010 through McSweeney's. While writing the book Brandon drew inspiration from several kidnappings in the United States and saw this as a way for the character of Toby to "distinguish himself from the common vandals and shoplifters Citrus County is crawling with."

== Synopsis ==
The book follows Toby, a young man that wants to set himself apart from the other criminals and hoodlums in his area. He's decided to accomplish this by kidnapping the young sister of a schoolmate, Shelby. Toby finds himself drawn to Shelby and the two bond over their mutual dissatisfaction with their lives and community, but Shelby has no way of knowing that he has kidnapped her sister. During all of this their high school geography teacher has been made to coach the school's all-girl basketball team while making plans with Shelby's aunt to murder one of his co-workers.

== Reception ==
Critical reception for Citrus County has been largely positive and the book has received praise from Publishers Weekly, the Sydney Morning Herald and the St. Louis Post-Dispatch. The Tampa Bay Times noted that the book's location worked in its favor, drawing comparison to the 2005 kidnapping and murder of Jessica Lunsford. The Phoenix and the SFGate both highlighted the relationship between Toby and Shelby, which the SFGate felt added additional pressure to the novel's atmosphere. Lemony Snicket author Daniel Handler also praised the novel, writing that it "subverts countless expectations to conform to our expectations of a very good book."

=== Awards ===
- Young Lions Fiction Award (2011, nominated)
- Alex Awards (2011, nominated)
