= Ben Breedlove =

American Internet personality (1993–2011)

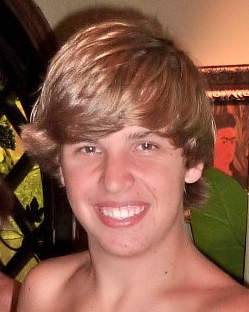
- Breedlove at home during Fourth of July 2010
- Born: Benjamin Daniel Breedlove; August 8, 1993; Austin, Texas, U.S.
- Died: December 25, 2011 (aged 18); Austin, Texas, U.S.
- Cause of death: Cardiac arrest
- Education: Westlake High School
- Occupation: Internet personality
- Years active: 2009–2011
- Known for: "This Is My Story", When Will the Heaven Begin? This is Ben Breedlove's Story

Benjamin Daniel Breedlove (August 8, 1993 – December 25, 2011) was an American Internet personality from Austin, Texas, known for his vlogs on YouTube. On Christmas Day 2011, he died from complications of hypertrophic cardiomyopathy.

== Life and career ==
Ben Breedlove grew up in Austin, Texas, where he was a senior at Westlake High School. Ben lived with his parents along with his older sister Ally and younger brother Jake. In 2010, he began making video blogs on YouTube, in which he dealt out relationship advice to his peers.

Breedlove created the OurAdvice4You channel on YouTube in November 2010 with friends, Justin Miller and Megan Parken. On May 23, 2011, he launched his second channel, BreedloveTV, where he would answer questions about dating, relationships, and advice.

At an early age, Breedlove had been diagnosed with hypertrophic cardiomyopathy (HCM).

== "This Is My Story" viral video ==
On December 18, 2011, Breedlove released a two-part video on YouTube, titled "This is my story", in which Breedlove revealed his heart condition as well as the impact it had on his life, using note cards. He also mentioned his near-death experience.

"I was at school, walking in the hall. I could tell I was going to faint, so I sat on a bench. I passed out. The next thing I know, I woke up with EMS around me. I couldn't talk or move, I could only watch what they were doing. They put the shock pads on my chest. I heard one of them say 'They are ready'. And the other guy said 'Go!'. I passed out again. My heart stopped and I wasn't breathing for 3 minutes."

— Breedlove on the third time he "cheated death".

On May 5, 2009, Breedlove underwent surgery to insert a pacemaker. The pacemaker helped regulate his heart rhythm. In the video he shows a red scar on his chest, where the pacemaker had been inserted.

== Death ==
Breedlove died at the age of 18 due to cardiac arrest on the evening of December 25, 2011.

== Aftermath ==
=== Media coverage and memorials ===
News of his death received media attention from around the world, on 27 December, two days after his death, his story first appearing on Australia's Ninemsn before coverage spread out through the world on other major media outlets, including the Los Angeles Times, ABC, CBS News, MSNBC, Fox News, MTV, The Independent, Herald Sun, The Washington Post, People Magazine, and The Wall Street Journal.

On December 29, Breedlove's funeral was held at the Gateway Church, in Austin, Texas. More than 1,400 people attended the service, and another 11,000 watched online. He was interred at Austin Memorial Park Cemetery in Austin, Travis County, Texas, USA. A day after Breedlove's death, Kid Cudi said in reaction, "This has really touched my heart in a way I can't describe, this is why I do what I do." Cudi later dedicated his third studio album Indicud (2013), to Breedlove and all his fans that have died; the dedication can be found in the album's liner notes.

=== HCMA and the HEARTS Act ===
On January 5, 2012, the HCMA announced that they mourn the death of Breedlove and are encouraging their members to "tell their stories the same way as Ben." Lisa Salberg, founder and CEO of HCMA, along with New Jersey Congressman Frank Pallone Jr. had worked together in drafting the Cardiomyopathy Health Education, Awareness, Risk Assessment, and Training in the Schools (HEARTs) act. The Bill was introduced in January 2012 to Congress.

The Westlake High School Student Council and Friday Night Fan Stand collected donations for the Hypertrophic Cardiomyopathy Association during the Ben Breedlove Memorial Football Game which took place at the Westlake football stadium on September 21, 2012. Fans wore white as a show of support and a moment of silence was observed. Funds collected were used for educational efforts relating to the disease that claimed Breedlove's life.

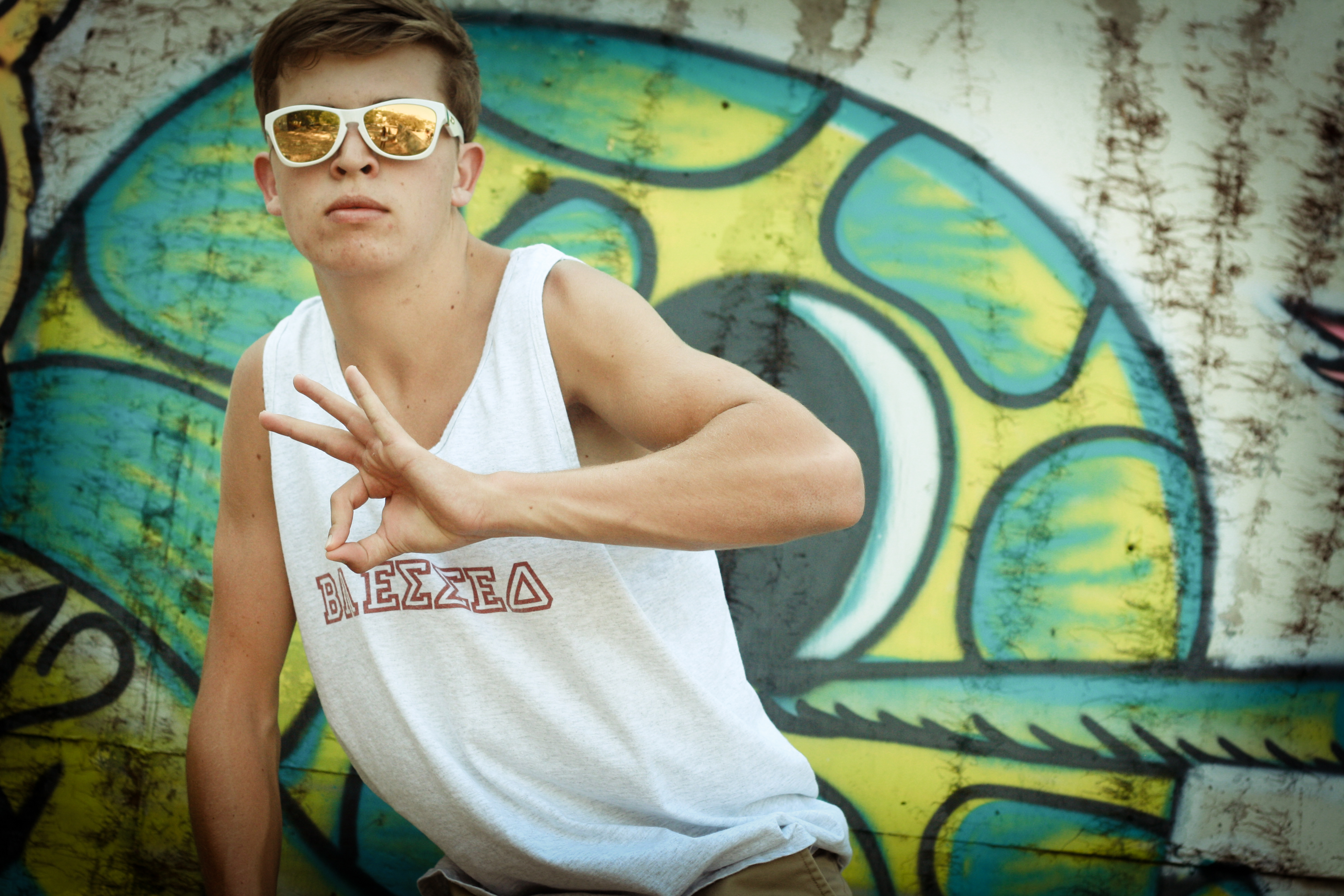
Breedlove in September 2011.

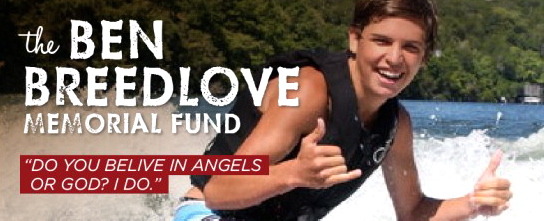
The Ben Breedlove Memorial Fund for Africa New Life takes boys off the streets of Rwanda and clothes, feeds and educates them while teaching them that Jesus has a plan for their lives.

=== Africa New Life Ministries ===
On December 27, 2011, the Ben Breedlove Memorial Fund was created at Africa New Life Ministries.

=== 2013 Tournament of Roses Parade ===
On January 1, 2013, Ben Breedlove was honored in a florograph on the Donate Life float, titled "Journeys of the Heart". Family members and friends contributed to the florograph which was then placed on the float.

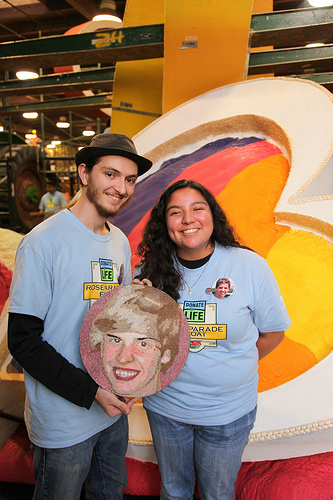
Volunteers, family and friends created the florograph of Breedlove for the Donate Life float that was in the Tournament of Roses Parade. The florograph is made of all natural materials, such as seeds, petals and stems.

=== When Will the Heaven Begin? ===
On October 29, 2013, the book, When Will the Heaven Begin? was released by Penguin Publishers. The book was listed on The New York Times Best Seller List beginning the first week of the release date. The memoir of Ben's life is written by his sister Ally Breedlove with Ken Abraham. The title of the book is taken from the lyric of the song "Mr. Rager", written and performed by Kid Cudi. Ben stated that during his second cardiac arrest, he had a vision of being in a peaceful, white room, in which his favorite rapper Kid Cudi, appeared alongside him as the lyrics to the song "Mr. Rager", began playing.

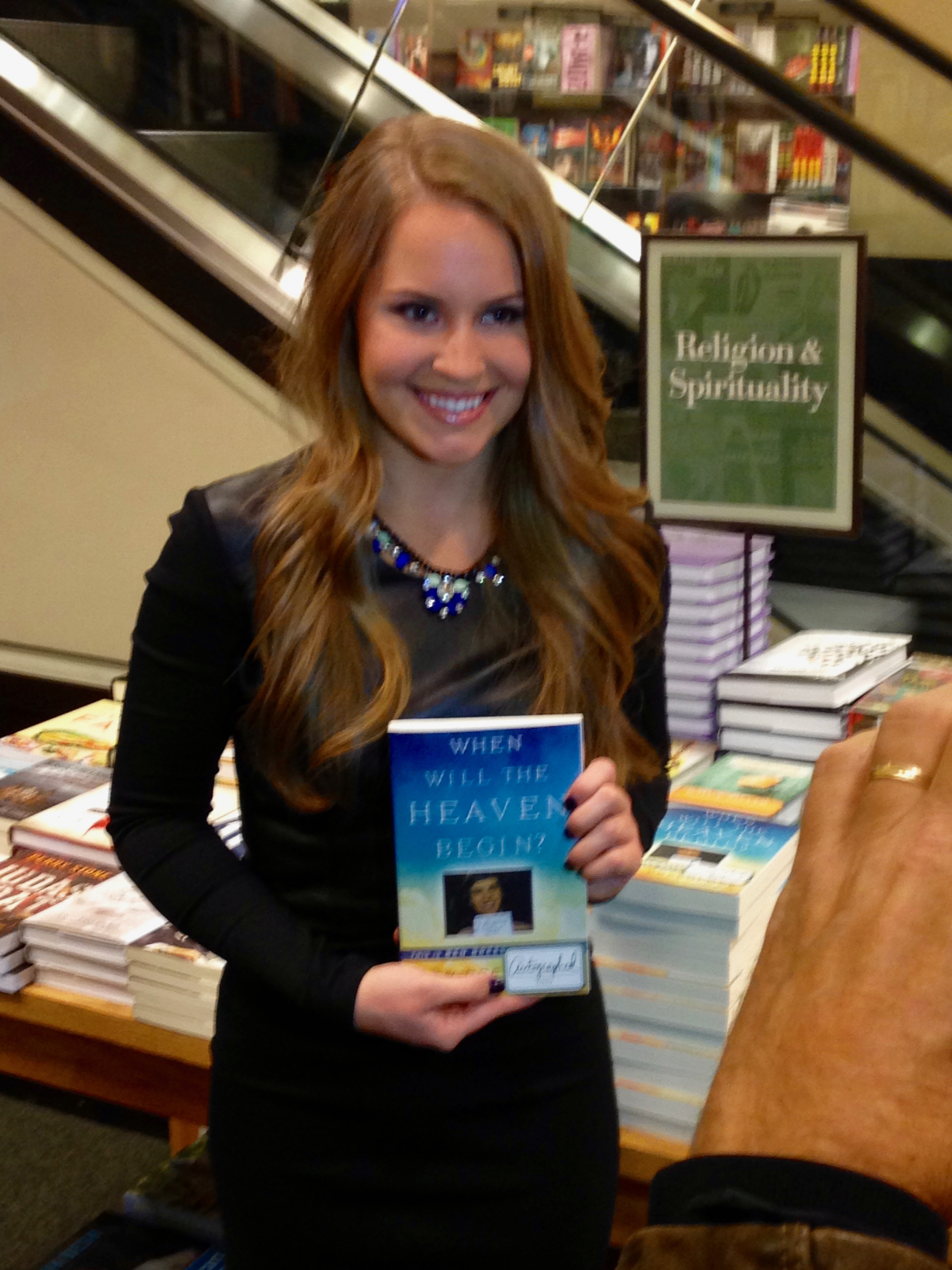
Ally Breedlove and Ken Abraham co-author a memoir of Breedlove's life titled "When Will the Heaven Begin".

=== To Heaven and Back CNN television special ===
On December 1, 2013, CNN aired an Anderson Cooper special highlighting the near-death stories of Dr. Mary Neal, Anita Moorjani and Benjamin Breedlove.

=== Additional publications ===
Breedlove's life story has been chronicled in several other publications, including "Imagine Heaven: Near Death Experiences, God's Promises and the Exhilarating Future that Awaits You" by John Burke, "Soul Models: Transformative Stories of Courage and Compassion That Will Change Your Life" by Elizabeth Bryan and Angela Daffron and "Echoes of a Life Well Lived" by Richard M. O'Bryan.

=== In music ===
Breedlove's story has been honored in several musical pieces, including Kid Cudi's dedication of his album, "INDICUD". The Chicago group, Empire, includes their song, "Journey Kid" on their most recent album titled "Orphan". Journey Kid can also be viewed on YouTube. Australian composer Phillip Wilcher composed a 4-string quartet piece titled "Remembered upon Waking", performed by the Linden Quartet. David LaCroix wrote and dedicated his piece, "In A Little While" to Breedlove and all the people that have "gone on to a better place than here".

=== Gabriel Art Installation ===
Breedlove's legacy continues in the form of art installations and community arts programs. "Gabriel", a rugged angel wing sculpture made of fossilized bluestone by artist Bobby Jacobs, was installed in the Healing Garden at Dell Children's Medical Center. "Gabriel" symbolizes the strength and comfort of angels in times of need. It is a reminder to "see" the unseen – God's ministering spirits at work in this world. Second Lady Karen Pence visiting Gabriel with Breedlove's mother in 2017

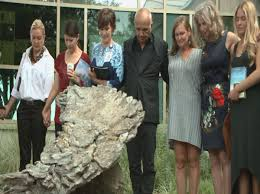
Sculpture "Gabriel", honoring Breedlove, is installed in Dell Children's Healing Garden.

=== The Spread Your Wings Community Arts Program ===
The "Spread Your Wings" Community Arts Program took flight at Dell Children's Medical Center's 2017 "Art of Giving" event when the art piece, "Spread Your Wings", broke fundraising records for Dell Children's. The piece is a painted set of angel wings on canvas that was created by artist Elizabeth-Bryan Jacobs. She says the piece was inspired by Breedlove's YouTube video because he told of being visited and comforted by angels during his lifetime. Breedlove had also been a frequent patient at Dell Children's Medical Center.

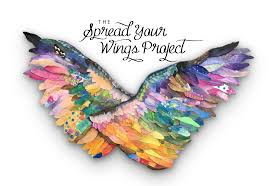

This piece hangs in the newly created Texas Center for Pediatric and Congenital Heart Disease. The "Spread your Wings' piece is the inspiration for the "Spread Your Wings" community arts program which will add angel wing art installations to hospitals and other community centers across the nation.

The first official "Spread Your Wings" installation took place on October 1, 2018, at the Las Vegas Community Healing Garden, which honors the 58 victims of the 2017 Las Vegas shooting. "Love and Courage" is a gorgeous 6' tall sculpture and is engraved with the initials of the 58 victims.

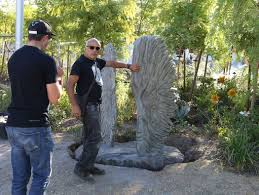
"Love and Courage" is the first official art installation of the "Spread Your Wings" Community Arts Program, inspired by Breedlove.
