= I Dream Too Much (2015 film) =

- Film poster
- Directed by: Katie Cokinos
- Written by: Katie Cokinos
- Produced by: Ed McWilliams; Jay Thames
- Starring: Eden Brolin; Diane Ladd; Danielle Brooks; James McCaffrey; Christina Rouner
- Cinematography: Alex Rappoport
- Edited by: Alex Rappoport
- Music by: Heidi Rodewald
- Distributed by: The Orchard
- Release date: March 2015 (South by Southwest)
- Running time: 91 minutes
- Country: United States
- Language: English

I Dream Too Much is a 2015 American coming of age comedy-drama film written and directed by Katie Cokinos and starring Eden Brolin, Danielle Brooks and Diane Ladd. The film is Cokinos' directorial debut and Richard Linklater served as an executive producer.

== Plot ==
Instead of chasing boys on the beach with her friends, recent college grad Dora finds herself caring for her reclusive Great Aunt in snowy upstate New York. When the imaginative girl discovers her aunt's hidden romantic past, Dora dreams that their revelation will pull Aunt Vera and herself from their mutual depressions.

== Cast ==
- Eden Brolin as Dora
- Diane Ladd as Vera
- Danielle Brooks as Abbey
- James McCaffrey as Nikki
- Christina Rouner as Helen
- Chelsea Lopez as Irene
