= Marijuana (song) =

Promotional single by Kid Cudi

from the album Man on the Moon II: The Legend of Mr. Rager
- Released: November 9, 2010
- Recorded: 2010
- Genre: Alternative hip hop; neo-psychedelia; rap rock
- Length: 4:20
- Label: Dream On; GOOD; Universal Motown
- Songwriters: Scott Mescudi; Oladipo Omishore
- Producers: Dot da Genius; Kid Cudi

Music video
- "Marijuana" on YouTube

"Marijuana" is a single by American hip hop recording artist Kid Cudi, as a promotional single taken from his second studio album Man on the Moon II: The Legend of Mr. Rager (2010). The song was produced by Cudi, alongside American record producer Dot da Genius, who provided the song's guitar solo.

== Background ==
The song is an ode to cannabis. It is of special interest that the song lasts exactly four minutes and twenty seconds and Kid Cudi ends the song by saying "and 4:20", a reference to 420, a popular number in cannabis culture.

In a 2013 interview, Cudi revealed that he had stopped smoking marijuana two years earlier, both for the sake of his child, and due to frustration with constantly being associated with the drug and stoner culture. He felt it became his gimmick, saying, "I felt it around the time I was doing Man on the Moon II. I was like, 'Man, I’m going to make a song called "Marijuana."' I felt it would put me deeper in that little pocket. If you ask me, that’s the best smoking song ever made. I went out to achieve and accomplish that."

== Music video ==
The song's music video, shot and directed by Shia LaBeouf, was filmed in Amsterdam back in 2010, when Cudi served as a judge for the High Times' Cannabis Cup. LaBeouf originally reached out to Cudi through their mutual friend Cage, because he wanted to shoot a short film titled Maniac centered around "MANIAC," another song from Man on the Moon II: The Legend of Mr. Rager: "While we were brainstorming that, I had the gig to perform in Amsterdam. I was thinking about ways to do a video for 'Marijuana' because I knew I wanted to do something and I wanted to do the right thing," Cudi told MTV News from the set of his HBO series How to Make It in America. "And it just hit me one day, like, 'Yo, I can have Shia come with me and film the whole trip and we could do it like a real vintage documentary style of the entire trip.' What could be iller than that?"

The video shows Cudi and Cage arriving in Amsterdam, moving through a restaurant, their hotel and the famed red-light district smoking exotic strains of weed. Aesthetically, the "Marijuana" video comes off like old home footage thanks to LaBeouf's 8 mm and 16 mm cameras. "That's why it looks real vintage; that's not an effect," Cudi said.

Some fans were confused by the video, however, given that on April 1, 2011, Kid Cudi announced on his Tumblr page that he had given up smoking marijuana. Kid Cudi assured MTV that nothing had changed: "It's something I did before I decided to quit smoking marijuana," Cudi explained of the video. "However, I didn't want to deprive people of the footage, deprive people of the video because of my personal decisions. It was almost like an R.I.P. video to my whole smoking career." Cudi insisted that he is done with herb. "That was a big, big, memorable moment for me and watching it reminds me of those good times we had," he said. "It's kinda like the last hoorah, the last time you will ever see me smoking."

== Charts ==
Chart (2010)	Peak position
Canada (Canadian Hot 100)	68
US Billboard Hot 100	54

=== Certifications ===
Region	Certification	Certified units/sales
United States (RIAA)	Gold	500,000^{‡}
^{‡} Sales+streaming figures based on certification alone.
