= Eden Brolin =

American actress (born 1994)

- Born: November 30, 1994 (age 31); Los Angeles, California, U.S.
- Occupation: Actress
- Years active: 2008–present
- Spouse: Cameron Crosby (m. 2022)
- Father: Josh Brolin
- Relatives: James Brolin (grandfather); Barbra Streisand (step-grandmother)

Eden Brolin (born November 30, 1994) is an American actress, singer, and musician. She is best known for her role as Charlie Singer in the Beyond television series and as Mia in Yellowstone. She is the daughter of actor Josh Brolin and Alice Adair.

== Career ==
Brolin's first starring role was in the Richard Linklater-produced indie feature I Dream Too Much. Other credits include Code Black and Manson's Lost Girls.

Brolin stars as the mysterious Charlie Singer in the supernatural drama Beyond on the Freeform TV channel. After a well-reviewed performance in season one, she was quickly promoted to a series regular by the network.

Brolin also stars as Mia opposite Kevin Costner in the western drama Yellowstone, where she plays a barrel racer at the rodeo who becomes friendly with the bunkhouse guys.

She starred as Ophelia in a 2019 stage production of Hamlet.

In 2020, Brolin starred opposite Liam Hemsworth and Vince Vaughn in the Lionsgate theatrical feature Arkansas.

Brolin is also the lead singer of the music group known as Atta Boy, and eight years after the band's debut album titled Out of Sorts was released, their second album titled Big Heart Manners was released on June 26, 2020. Atta Boy's third album, Crab Park, was released in 2022, followed by Silt in June 2026.

== Personal life ==
Brolin married her husband actor Cameron Crosby on May 1, 2022.

== Filmography ==
=== Film ===
Year	Title	Role	Notes
2008	X	Jasmine	Short film
2012	Ruby Sparks	Party Goer 2 - Hammer	
2015	I Dream Too Much	Dora	
2016	Live Forever	Eden	Short film
2016	Emerald City	Lucy	
2019	Blood Bound	Kerry	
2019	Back Fork	Nona	
2020	Arkansas	Johnna	
2021	Tyger Tyger	Tammie	
2022	Candy Land	Riley	
2022	The Cleaner	Becky	
2024	Long Gone Heroes	Julia	
TBA	Kingfish	Daphne	Post-production

=== Television ===
Year	Title	Role	Notes
2016	Manson's Lost Girls	Susan Atkins	Television film
2016	Code Black	Dana Albright	Episode: "1.0 Bodies"
2017–2018	Beyond	Charlie Singer	Recurring role (season 1), Main role (season 2); 15 episodes
2020–2023	Yellowstone	Mia	Recurring role (season 3–present); 7 episodes
