= John Brandon (writer) =

American novelist and teacher

- Born: Bradenton, Florida, U.S.
- Education: University of Florida, Washington University in St. Louis (MFA)
- Occupations: Novelist; writer; professor
- Writing career
- Genres: Southern Gothic, cult fiction
- Notable works: "A Million Heavens," "Citrus Country," "Arkansas," "Further Joy"

John Brandon is an American novelist and teacher. A young cult fiction author, heavily influenced by Flannery O'Connor.

== Biography ==
Brandon was born in Bradenton, Florida, attended elementary school in Elfers, and attended Bayonet Middle School and River Ridge High School in New Port Richey. He later attended the University of Florida, where he received a degree in English. Brandon also received a Master's degree in fiction writing from Washington University in St. Louis. After writing Arkansas Brandon gained the attention of Barry Hannah, who nominated him for the John and Renee Grisham Writer-in-Residence program at the University of Mississippi. He then went on to work a series of warehouse and factory jobs before holding a one-year fellowship at the Gilman School and teaching at Hamline University in Minnesota. He was also GQ's SEC College Football analyst. He is a self-proclaimed worshiper of Joy Williams.

== Awards and nominations ==
- Young Lions Fiction Award (2011, nominated for Citrus County)
- Alex Awards (2011, nominated for Citrus County)

== Bibliography ==
- Arkansas (McSweeney's, 2009)
- Citrus County (McSweeney's, 2010)
- A Million Heavens (McSweeney's, 2012)
- Further Joy (McSweeney's, 2014)
- Ivory Shoals (McSweeney's, 2021)
- Penalties of June (McSweeney's, 2024)
