= Paranoid (Kanye West song) =

Single by Kanye West featuring Mr Hudson

from the album 808s & Heartbreak
- Released: March 23, 2009
- Recorded: 2008
- Studio: Glenwood (Burbank, California); Avex Recording (Honolulu, Hawaii)
- Genre: New wave
- Length: 4:37 (album version); 4:45 (new mix); 3:25 (video version)
- Label: Roc-A-Fella; Def Jam
- Songwriters: Kanye West; Patrick Reynolds; Scott Mescudi; Dexter Mills; Jeff Bhasker
- Producer: Kanye West

Kanye West singles chronology
"Amazing" (2009)	"Paranoid" (2009)	"Knock You Down" (2009)

Mr Hudson singles chronology
"There Will Be Tears" (2008)	"Paranoid" (2009)	"Supernova" (2009)

Music video
- "Paranoid" on YouTube

"Paranoid" is a song by American rapper Kanye West from his fourth studio album, 808s & Heartbreak (2008). The song features vocals from English musician Mr Hudson and background vocals from fellow American rapper Kid Cudi. West handled the production, with co-production from Jeff Bhasker and Plain Pat. The song was written by the producers alongside Kid Cudi and American rapper Consequence. It was serviced to top 40 radio stations in the United States on March 23, 2009, as the fourth and final single from the album. An upbeat new wave track, the song features electronic drum effects and pop synths. Its lyrical content is centered around West being pushed away by the mistrustful thinking of a woman that he is in love with, it also directly foreshadows the song "Lost in the World" in the lyrics, which later appeared on his 5th studio album, My Beautiful Dark Twisted Fantasy.

The song received universal acclaim from music critics, with the majority of them being complimentary towards the production, while some critics compared "Paranoid" to the works of other artists. It charted at numbers 14 and 90 on the Belgium Ultratip Wallonia chart and ARIA Singles Chart, respectively, in 2009. That same year, the song reached number 18 on the US Bubbling Under Hot 100 chart, and has since been certified gold in the US by the Recording Industry Association of America (RIAA). West and Mr Hudson have performed the song live together on numerous occasions, including at the 2009 iTunes Festival. An accompanying music video, directed by Nabil Elderkin and starring Rihanna, was released on June 3, 2009. Based around a fantasy from her paranoid mindstate, the video sees her going through a dream sequence. It received a nomination for Best Visual Effects at the 2009 MTV Video Music Awards. A remix, featuring Mr Hudson and rapper Big Sean, was released in December 2008. Since its release, the song has been covered by both the Suzan and Kali Uchis.

== Background ==
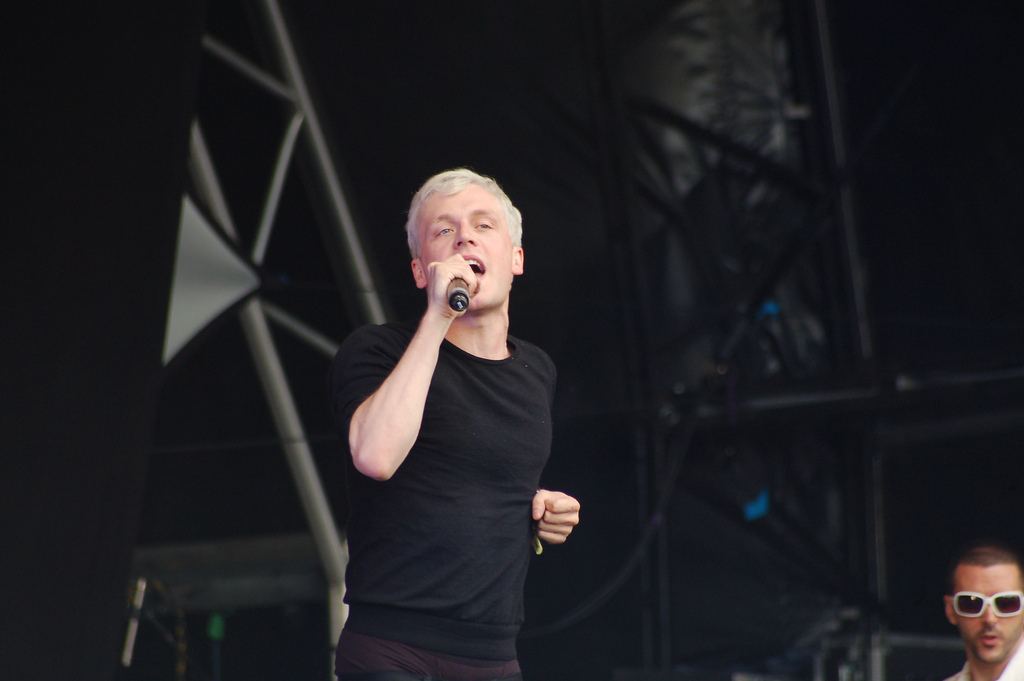
The song includes a feature from Mr Hudson, pictured in 2009.

West produced "Paranoid", while the song was co-produced by American record producers Jeff Bhasker and Plain Pat. The producers co-wrote it with Consequence and rapper Kid Cudi. Outside of his feature on the song, Mr Hudson helped write and produce fellow 808s & Heartbreak tracks "Say You Will" and "Street Lights". The musician received a phone call from West while on vacation in Paris; West was drawn in by his charm and subsequently recruited him for "Paranoid". After featuring Mr Hudson on the song, West signed him to his record label GOOD Music. The musician subsequently released his debut studio album Straight No Chaser under GOOD Music in October 2009, with West contributing vocals on the single "Supernova". West and Kid Cudi first met each other at a Virgin Megastore in 2004, with the meeting including Cudi requesting West to sign him; West respectfully declined the request, though the rapper told him, "I have the potential for greatness." After Plain Pat sent West Kid Cudi's debut mixtape A Kid Named Cudi (2008), West arrived at the mixtape's listening party and took Cudi under his wing. He subsequently co-wrote several songs on the album in Hawaii with West, including "Paranoid" and "Heartless". Kid Cudi has been believed to have directly influenced the album's creation, which West himself confirmed as being true. 808s & Heartbreak track "Welcome to Heartbreak" stood as the first ever collaboration between the two, though they later collaborated on numerous other tracks, including Kid Cudi's "Erase Me" and West's "Gorgeous". They went on to form a duo under the name of Kids See Ghosts, releasing their eponymous debut studio album on June 8, 2018.

Though the majority of the album sees West at his most vulnerable, "Paranoid" is one of its most joyful songs. The song was recorded during the period of three weeks that West worked on 808s & Heartbreak in 2008. Seeking out a minimalist direction sonically, West directed his team to bring unique drum machines to Avex Recording Studio in Honolulu, Hawaii. They were sampled and reprogrammed into West's Roland TR-808 drum machine at the studio, which recording engineer Anthony Kilhoffer explained was responsible for the song's "unique sounds". Note this has to be an error as the Roland TR-808 does not sample and the engineer is probably referring to West's Ensoniq ASR-10 Sampler. West had been looking for an electronic sound with the album, which the song includes.

== Composition and lyrics ==
"Paranoid"
An 24-second sample of "Paranoid", showcasing the electronic drum effects and pop synths on the chorus. The instrumentation is accompanied by vocals from West, Mr Hudson, and Kid Cudi.

Musically, "Paranoid" is an upbeat new wave song that runs for a duration of four minutes and thirty-seven seconds, and includes an electronic sound throughout. Its instrumentation has synth-pop elements, nodding towards influences such as English musician Phil Collins and pop rock band Tears for Fears. The instrumentation contains electronic drum effects and pop synths. The song utilizes the Roland TR-808, which creates a sparse sound. Blips and keyboards are also featured, the latter of which were contributed by Bhasker. The song commences with an insistent tone that is followed by a 1980s-style chord, before the switch to upbeat occurs at the 50 second mark. Throughout the song, West sings through Auto-Tune. West, Mr Hudson, and Kid Cudi perform its chorus, with the latter of the three's vocals being included in the background.

Throughout the song, West sings about being in a serious relationship with a lady that pushes him away with her mistrustful thinking, whom he believes "worries about the wrong things". West begins the song by excitedly saying, "Why are you so paranoid?" The lyrics are used in the first verse by him to show that even though the song may seem positive, its background circulates around conflict and death. West recites lines that depict a negative image and reveal feelings of opposition towards the lady he is referencing.

== Release ==
"Paranoid" was released as the sixth track on West's fourth studio album 808s & Heartbreak on November 24, 2008. It was sent to radio stations in the United States five months later on March 23, 2009 as the album's fourth single, shortly after the release of the third single, "Amazing". While "Amazing" was serviced to rhythmic/urban radio stations, "Paranoid" was only sent to US top 40 radio. A digital EP was released in the US on June 16, which included a new mix of "Paranoid" and the song's accompanying music video. That same day, the new mix was released on its own as a digital download in the US. Six days later, the same version was released for download in Belgium.

On December 16, 2008, a remix was released featuring Big Sean and Mr Hudson. Another remix featuring Barbadian singer Rihanna had been recorded in the fall of 2008 and was supposed to be released to US mainstream radio stations on January 27, 2009, as the third single from 808s & Heartbreak.

== Critical reception ==
Paranoid was met with universal acclaim from music critics, with most praise going towards the production. Nathan Rabin of The A.V. Club looked at "Paranoid" as veering "into the Neptunes' twitchy, glitchy space-disco". The New York Times critic Jon Caramanica described it as a slick and breezy track and drew comparisons to the music of the Kelis and Omarion, saying "this music is redolent of the chilly, slightly irregular R&B the producers the Neptunes were making four or five years ago". The song was cited by Scott Plagenhoef of Pitchfork as being one of the best tracks on 808s & Heartbreak; he viewed it and his other best track selections as among the album's "most dismal, with cavernous production giving the Auto-Tune vocals more of an echoing desolation than a pop sheen". Simon Price of The Independent picked the song as the best track from the record and labelled it "anomalously upbeat". Isaac Shur, writing for WRBB 104.9 FM, commented that there is "remnants of [West's 2007 album] Graduation's more upbeat, dancey vibe on 'Paranoid,' demonstrating that 808s isn't a one trick pony of emotional ballads". Alex Macpherson from The Guardian saw the song's "disco bounce" as one of "the isolated moments of levity" on the album that "are a relief". For Slant Magazine, Wilson McBee chronicled that the song is "a disco-tinged track brighter than anything else on the album" and thought it "begs for a pulsating bassline", while pinpointing Mr Hudson's chorus as the main reason behind the success. Ally Brown of The Skinny described the song as what "has an irresistible playful synth-line and reassuring chorus hook courtesy of Mr Hudson". In 2023, Billboard named it the 23rd best pop song to never hit the US Billboard Hot 100, with the magazine's writers highlighting the "neon shimmer" of Graduation's singles that results in a pop sound.

A few reviewers viewed "Paranoid" in a more negative light. At NME, Jaimie Hodgson assumed that the song fails to distract from its "flaky" hook and "backpack-rap-style" beat via "Frenchie-coffee-table-lektro blips". Charles Aaron from Spin described it as where "you're left anxiously conflicted, with the weird sensation that you've somehow stumbled onto a boys-only Kanye karaoke party, where he's trashed on Baileys and inexplicably crooning the Ne-Yo songbook". Andy Kellman of AllMusic complained that the song's "relative pep" offers "no respite", noting the "bitter lyrics" undermine "a boisterous beat".

== Music video ==
=== Background ===
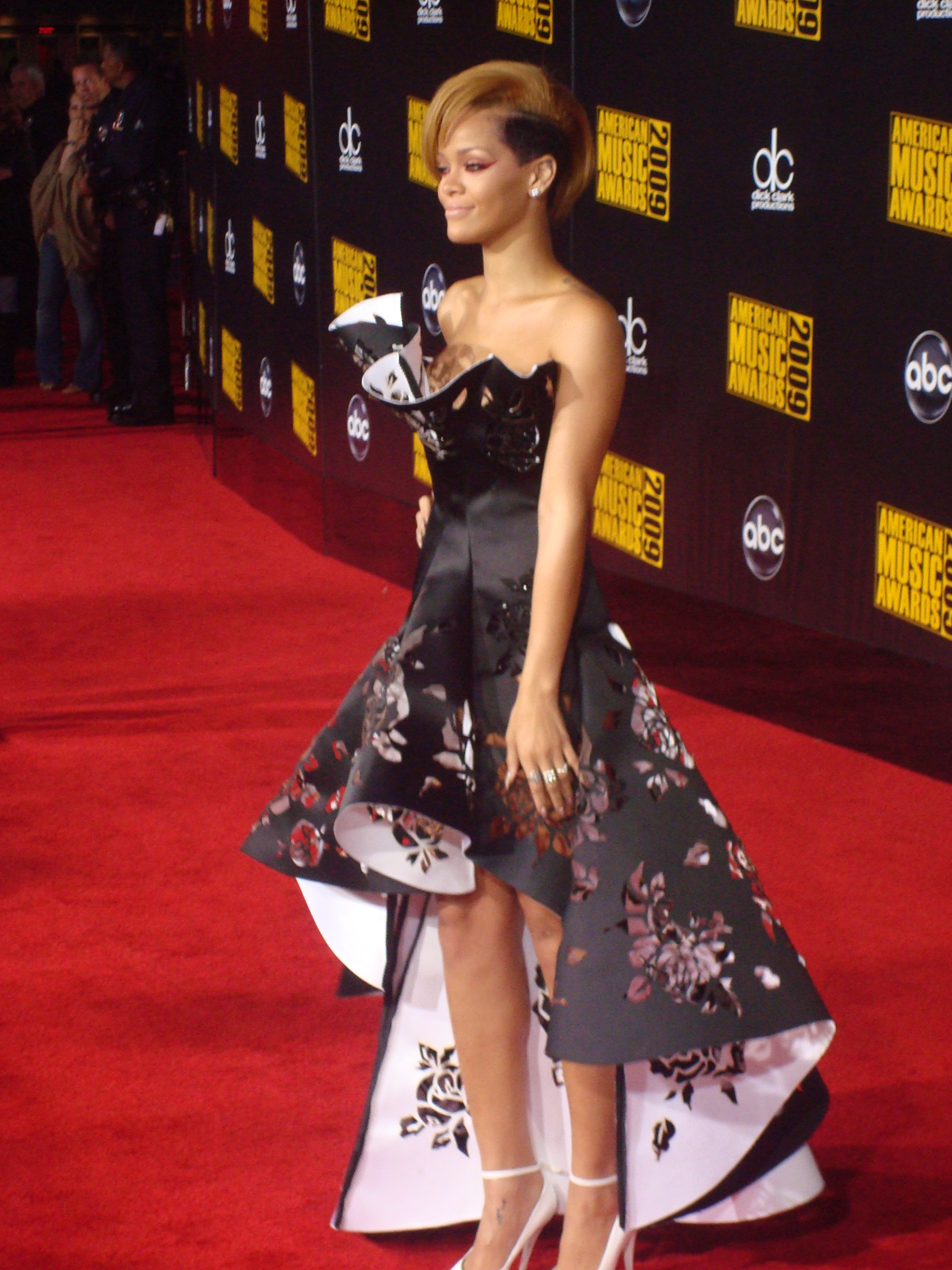
The accompanying music video stars Rihanna, following a fantasy based on her paranoid state of mind.

The music video for "Paranoid" was directed by Nabil Elderkin and along with the one for "Amazing", filmed in Hawaii. The state was one of the places that West recorded the song itself in. Elderkin had directed West in the past on the videos for "Champion" and "Welcome to Heartbreak". The song was the last track from 808s & Heartbreak to have an accompanying video released. During a brief interview at the 2009 Tribeca Film Festival, West revealed he had cast Rihanna as a lead in the video. In reference to working with Rihanna, West said in the interview: "Yep, she's my Paranoid girl in the video. She's an amazing talent though. Collaborating with her is always a pleasure!" Prior to being cast, Rihanna had taken a break from making her own music videos.

Island Def Jam chairman L.A. Reid presented a version of the video during an Island Def Jam Event in New York City on May 20, 2009. The music video leaked online on May 27. The next day, West clarified on his blog that the video was an unfinished version that he was hurt to see leaked, posting screenshots of the final version. In an interview that took place the following day, Elderkin stated that the leak was merely an early rough cut. In terms of visuals, Elderkin had originally wanted to design the video in an artistic style reminiscent to that of A Clockwork Orange, but West subsequently opted for an abstracted noir concept instead.

=== Synopsis and reception ===
The music video's premise is rooted in fantasy, centering around Rihanna's paranoid state of mind causing her to experience a surrealistic dream sequence. Meanwhile, West appears in some scenes in his human form and also his wolf form during the dream sequence. On June 3, 2009, West released the finalized version of the music video on his blog, just hours after premiering an unreleased video for his 2004 song "Spaceship." It was revealed by West that the video was supposed to have been released on June 4, though he explained the early release with: "I'd rather you guys have a clear version...." After West released the music video for fellow 808s & Heartbreak track "Coldest Winter" in February 2010, Elderkin revealed that West originally had more screen time in the video for "Paranoid" than he had in the final version.

Shamz of Okayplayer felt that "the visuals only enhance the track further". Kathleen Newman-Bremang of MTV described the video as what "finds Kanye in his true form, delivering a high-concept music video that feels more like a piece of art than anything else". At the 2009 MTV Video Music Awards, it was nominated for Best Special Effects in a Video, but lost to "Paparazzi" by Lady Gaga.

== Commercial performance ==
On April 25, 2009, the song made its debut at number 37 on the US Billboard Mainstream Top 40 chart. It fell down to number 38 the following week, though ultimately peaked at number 34 on May 9. The same week as the peak, "Paranoid" entered the US Rhythmic chart at number 40. The song reached its peak of number 37 on the chart for the issue dated May 16, 2009. On the US Billboard Bubbling Under Hot 100, the song peaked at number 18 on May 18, 2009, and spent a total of two weeks on the chart. It was certified gold by the Recording Industry Association of America (RIAA) for pushing 500,000 certified units in the US on September 23, 2020.

For the issue date of July 20, 2009, "Paranoid" debuted at number 90 on the ARIA Singles Chart. The following week, it exited the chart. The song performed best on the Belgium Ultratip Wallonia chart, on which it peaked at number 14 for the issue dated September 12, 2009. Similarly, the song reached number 15 on the Belgium Ultratip Flanders chart issue dated August 29, 2009.

== Live performances ==
West performed the song as part of his February 2009 VH1 show. However, the performance was not originally broadcast on the network. Instead, it was issued as the twelfth and final performance on the DVD of West's second live album VH1 Storytellers on January 5, 2010, being included as a bonus number. While showcasing artists signed onto his GOOD Music imprint for South by Southwest (SXSW) at the Levi's/Fader Fort on March 21, 2009, West performed the song with Kid Cudi and Mr Hudson. During the showcase, West predicted that Mr Hudson will be playing 50,000-seat stadiums. In his diary, the musician writes that he was backstage when him and Kid Cudi were called on to join West for performing the chorus. Mr Hudson also recalls that the rapper shouted to him to "take the high notes" and suggested he will "take the low notes", which was followed by the two appearing on cue. During West's headlining set for the 2009 Wireless Festival at Hyde Park in London, he performed the song while rocking his customary aviator shades and black suit jacket. At the 2009 iTunes Festival, Mr Hudson encouraged West to perform more music with him after their performance of "Heartless". This was followed by the two delivering a performance of "Paranoid" with accompaniment from a seven-piece band, which was broadcast on ITV.

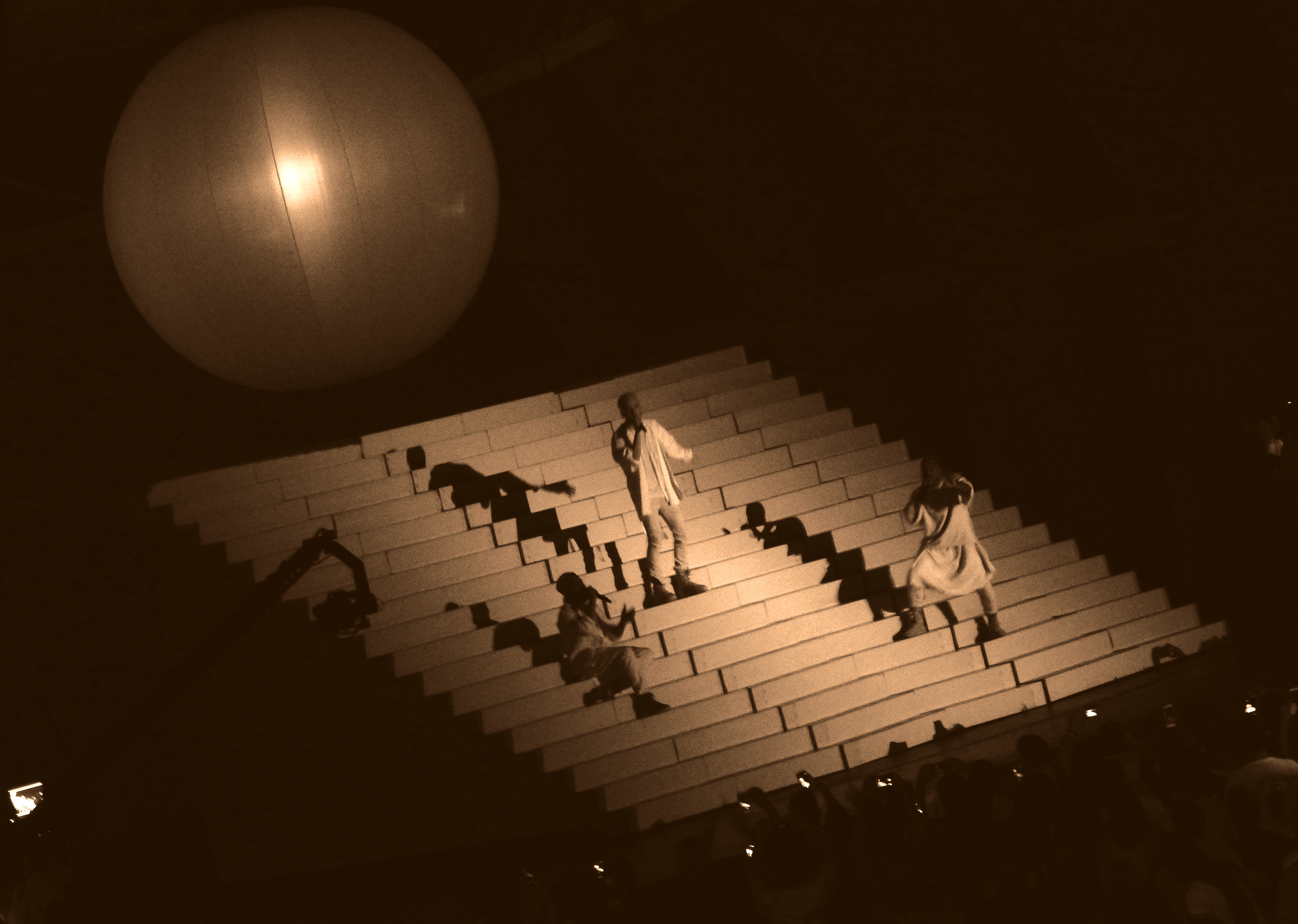
West, Mr Hudson, and Kid Cudi performing the song on a staircase at the 2015 Hollywood Bowl.

For West's two night concert of 808s & Heartbreak in full at the 2015 Hollywood Bowl in September, he performed the track with Mr Hudson and Kid Cudi as the set's sixth number. This marked West's first performance of the track since November 23, 2010, with him wearing loose garments in white and off-white shades as he performed. The performers were supported by a small band and a medium-sized orchestra, while the overhead lights turned from white to red. West, Mr Hudson, and Kid Cudi climbed a staircase on the stage together, before West asked if the crowd were enjoying themselves and happily stated, "It's my first time getting to play here!" The former of the three encouraged the crowd to appreciate the other two; he gave them a shout out towards the end of the performance. West and Kid Cudi performed "Paranoid" at the 2018 Camp Flog Gnaw Carnival, which was their first concert under the Kids See Ghosts moniker. While it stood as the ninth track of their set, the song was the first track the duo performed that was not released as Kids See Ghosts. The transparent box that they performed the song from featured flashing LEDs inside, and the crowd gave a strong reception to their performance.

== Cover versions and usage in media ==
In the lead up to the release of their 2010 studio album Golden Week For The Poco Poco Beat, Japanese pop rock band the Suzan shared a cover version of "Paranoid" on October 19, 2010. The cover is a ballad that has a stripped-down musical style with a minimal bassline. The lack of Auto-Tune on the ballad differs from the original, and it contains choral vocals. Following West's interruption of the band's showcase on October 23, 2010, they admitted he lacked awareness of the cover while being hopeful to collaborate with him on another version of the song.

On July 11, 2018, Colombian-American R&B singer Kali Uchis covered the track for her session at Maida Vale Studios on Annie Mac's BBC Radio 1 show, which was her only cover during the session. Prior to the performance, Uchis opened up about how she loves the song and West's older work in general, especially 808s & Heartbreak due to the heavy inspiration taken from it making her think covering "Paranoid" was sensical. She also announced herself as being a large fan of Kid Cudi's work, admitting to "just love all of the musicality of it and [...] how he was, like, trying to do something different with his voice and everything in it", specializing "the heart" in the song. Uchis started her performance 17 minutes and 20 seconds into the session, adding her signature sound and a soulful style to the song. Bryson Tiller sampled "Paranoid" on his track of the same title, which credits West for production.

== Track listings ==
Digital download

1. "Paranoid" (NEW Mix) [feat. Mr Hudson] – 4:45

Digital EP

1. "Paranoid" (NEW Mix) [feat. Mr Hudson] – 4:45
2. "Paranoid" (Music Video) [feat. Mr Hudson] – 3:24

== Credits and personnel ==
Information taken from 808s & Heartbreak liner notes.

Recording

- Recorded at Glenwood Studios (Burbank, California) and Avex Recording Studio (Honolulu, Hawaii)

Personnel

- Kanye West – songwriter, production
- Plain Pat – songwriter, co-production
- Jeff Bhasker – songwriter, co-production, keyboards
- Kid Cudi – songwriter, background vocals
- Dexter Mills – songwriter
- Andrew Dawson – recorder
- Anthony Kilhoffer – recorder
- Chad Carlisle – assistant recorder
- Isha Erskine – assistant recorder
- Gaylord Holomalia – assistant recorder
- Christian Mochizuki – assistant recorder
- Manny Marroquin – mix engineer
- Christian Plata – assistant engineer
- Erik Madrid – assistant engineer

== Charts ==
Chart performance for "Paranoid"
Chart (2009)	Peak position
Australia (ARIA)	90
Belgium (Ultratip Bubbling Under Flanders)	15
Belgium (Ultratip Bubbling Under Wallonia)	14
US Bubbling Under Hot 100 (Billboard)	18
US Pop Airplay (Billboard)	34
US Rhythmic Airplay (Billboard)	37

== Certifications ==
Certifications for "Paranoid"
Region	Certification	Certified units/sales
United States (RIAA)	Gold	500,000^{‡}
^{‡} Sales+streaming figures based on certification alone.

== Release history ==
Release dates and formats for "Paranoid"
Region	Date	Format	Label(s)	Ref.
United States	March 23, 2009	Top 40 radio	Roc-A-Fella; Def Jam	
United States	June 16, 2009	Digital EP	Roc-A-Fella; Def Jam	
United States	June 16, 2009	Digital download	Roc-A-Fella; Def Jam	
Belgium	June 22, 2009	Digital download	Roc-A-Fella; Def Jam	
