= Moon (Kanye West song) =

2021 song by Kanye West

Song by Kanye West

from the album Donda
- Released: August 29, 2021
- Recorded: July–August 2021
- Length: 2:36
- Label: GOOD; Def Jam
- Songwriters: Kanye West; Caleb Toliver; Scott Mescudi; Evan Mast; Jahmal Gwin; Khalil Abdul-Rahman; Malik Yusef
- Producers: Kanye West; E.Vax

"Moon" is a song by American rapper Kanye West from his tenth studio album, Donda (2021). The song includes vocals from fellow rappers Don Toliver and Kid Cudi. The production was handled by West and E.Vax, with co-production from BoogzDaBeast and DJ Khalil. All of the vocalists and producers wrote the song together alongside Malik Yusef. It initially only had an appearance from Toliver, however Kid Cudi was included after the album's first listening event in July 2021. Lil Yachty sought the rapper's appearance by reaching out to Vory, who arranged it through contact with West. The song had been crafted by West before Toliver worked on it in 2021, differing largely from the initial recording on the final version. A tender ballad, it features riffs of electric guitar and lyrics from Kid Cudi about reflecting to better himself.

"Moon" received generally positive reviews from music critics, who mostly praised Kid Cudi's appearance. Some reviewers were divided towards the song's presence on Donda being either an album highlight or underwhelming, while a few critics commended the composition. In the United States, the song reached number 17 on the Billboard Hot 100 and number 7 on the Hot R&B/Hip-Hop Songs chart. It attained top-40 positions in nine other countries, including New Zealand and Canada, while peaking at number 20 on the Billboard Global 200. The song received platinum and gold certifications in the US and Canada from the Recording Industry Association of America and Music Canada, respectively. On Halloween 2021, the Sunday Service Choir performed a gospel version with Justin Bieber. Artist Revenue Advocates issued a lawsuit against West for unauthorized elements of "MSD PT2" on the song in July 2024, accusing him of not having obtained a license for usage; later rulings determined that no direct audio samples were used on "Moon".

== Background and recording ==
West and Kid Cudi have appeared on various tracks together, beginning with "Welcome to Heartbreak" from the former's 2008 album 808s & Heartbreak. The rapper contributed to Kid Cudi's Man on the Moon: The End of Day the following year and even though he left West's label GOOD Music in 2013, the two remained collaborators. In 2018, they formed their duo Kids See Ghosts and released an eponymous studio album. Alongside appearing on "Moon", Kid Cudi recorded for fellow Donda track "Remote Control", though his contributions were removed from the final version.

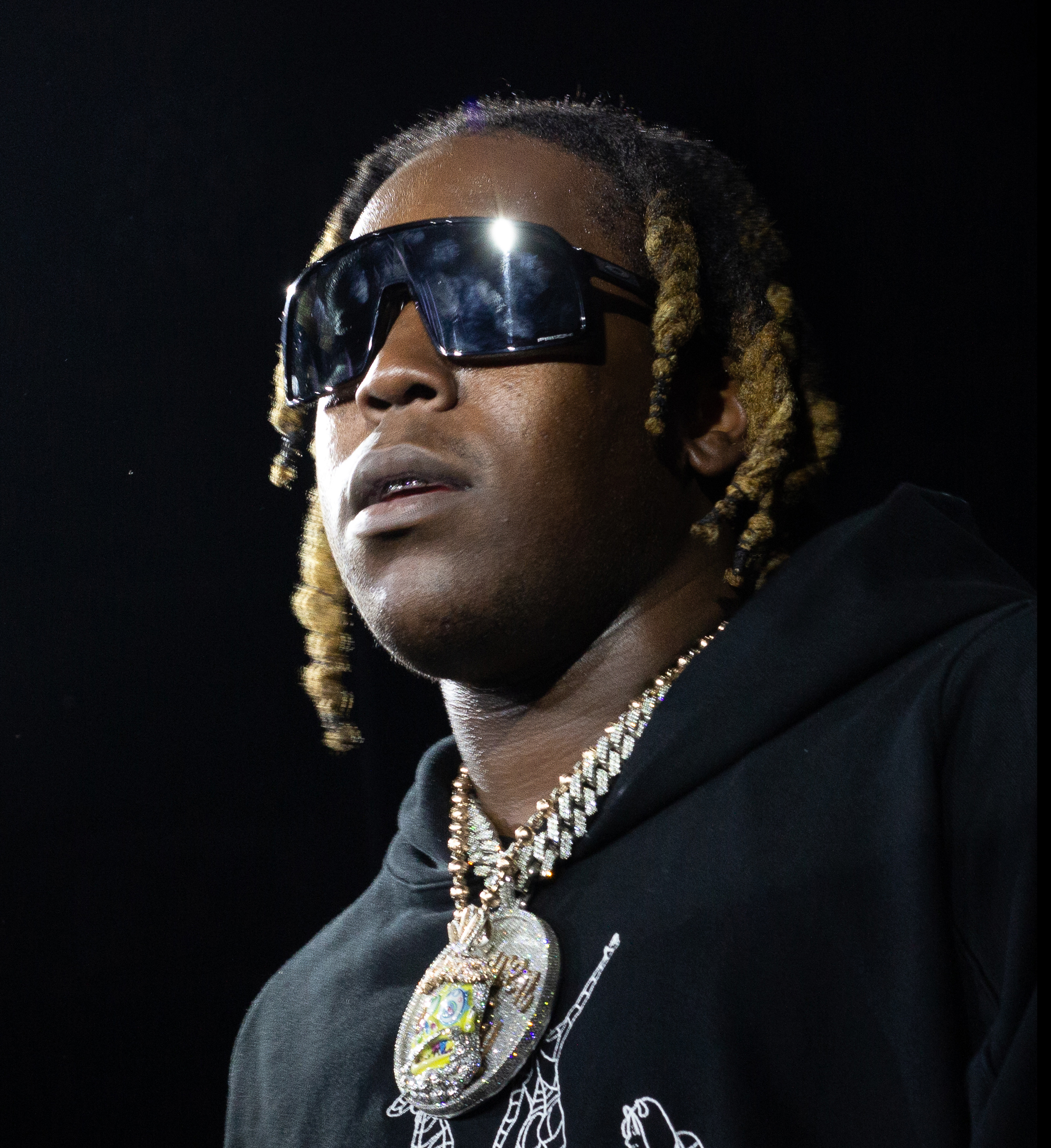
"Moon" features vocals from Don Toliver, who was included on versions of the song played at different listening events in 2021. It was one of the songs West had worked on before being given to the rapper during a recording session, differing largely from the initial recording to the final version.

"Moon" was debuted during the album's first listening event July 23, 2021, at Mercedes-Benz Stadium in Atlanta, though only Don Toliver made an appearance on this version. By the time the second listening party for Donda was held at the stadium on August 5, the song had been updated to include an appearance from Kid Cudi alongside Toliver. The rapper tweeted that the final version was new to him since he had not heard it before the event and clarifying that although he knew of his presence on the album, he did not "hear final mixes". Kid Cudi also recalled that he was not on the album when he previously tweeted this, explaining West contacted him the next week and they worked on the collaboration. A new version of "Moon" was played for Donda's third listening event at Soldier Field in Chicago on August 26, 2021, which replaced Kid Cudi with West's gospel group the Sunday Service Choir. The version of the track that was included on the album three days later restored Kid Cudi's appearance alongside Toliver.

During a Twitch livestream on September 7, 2021, fellow rapper Lil Yachty, who appears on fellow Donda track "Ok Ok", said that he was behind Kid Cudi being included on "Moon". After the song became popular on TikTok from the album's first listening party, the rapper expressed enthusiasm that Kid Cudi "would sound great" on it. Lil Yachty contacted fellow rapper and album contributor Vory to arrange the appearance, who in turn got in contact with West. West then recruited Kid Cudi; Lil Yachty said of the collaboration, "Y'all can thank me." Speaking on In the Morning for Hot 97 in October 2021, Toliver recalled that he and West worked heavily on songs a couple of months before the album's final recording sessions. (Note: The final recording sessions were held in August 2021.) He once arrived at a session where West had made tracks prior and he then left with some of them, working on numerous different records including "Moon". Toliver said his initial recording was completely different from the final version, although he felt blessed that it ended up becoming the song. Around the time of the October 2021 interview, West had gifted Toliver a NASA jacket to honor his appearance.

== Composition and lyrics ==
The song was produced by West and E.Vax, while it was co-produced by BoogzDaBeast and DJ Khalil; the producers served as songwriters with Toliver, Kid Cudi, and Malik Yusef. Musically, "Moon" is a tender ballad. The song was noted as seemingly featuring silence by both The New York Times and Vulture. It prominently features electric guitar riffs, alongside synth lines.

Kid Cudi and Toliver harmonize together on the song, contributing more vocals than West. Toliver also croons, while Kid Cudi utilizes his signature smooth vocals. The latter sings about reflection, thinking about being "a better me". He also performs a falsetto, singing "Here we go, strap in, we up/Never forget all the memories".

== Release and reception ==
On August 29, 2021, West's 10th studio album Donda was released by West's labels GOOD Music and Def Jam, including "Moon" as the 13th track. On October 31, 2021, the Sunday Service Choir performed a gospel rendition of the song with Canadian singer Justin Bieber for their Halloween concert at an anonymous rooftop location. The group wore white linens for the performance, as did West as an onlooker. At the time of the album's deluxe release on November 14, 2021, the Sunday Service Choir performed the song during a concert.

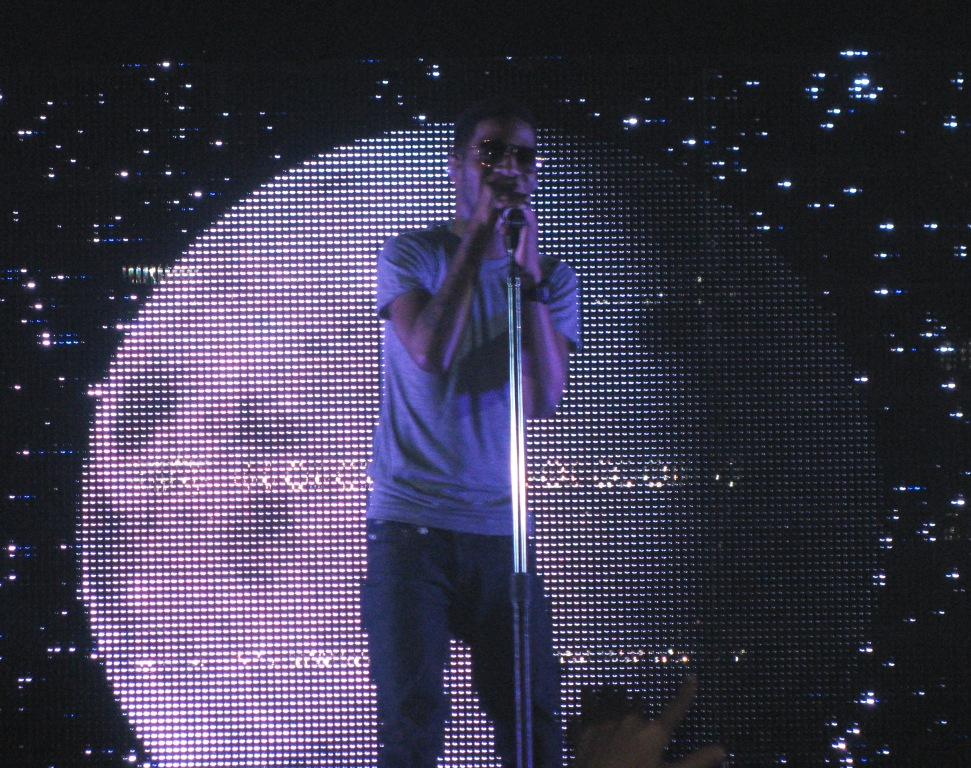
Numerous reviewers praised Kid Cudi's appearance, highlighting the smoothness of his vocals.

"Moon" was met with generally positive reviews from music critics. Writing for HipHopDX, Andy Bustard declared that the "tender, spiritual interlude" relies on "the potent combination of Cudi's signature soothing vocals" with Toliver's "high-pitched crooning". Craig Jenkins of Vulture highlighted the song as a "requisite Kid Cudi tearjerker" that entices with its guitar, while Exclaim!'s Riley Wallace felt the rapper's appearance helps make it one of the album's best tracks. At Slate, Carl Wilson saw "Moon" as one of the album's tracks that reaches its potential through West's guests outperforming him. Similarly, Ryan Bell from DIY expressed that the strength of Kid Cudi's feature pushes West "awkwardly into the background on his own album". In GQ, Rindner Grant wrote that "the sweet, falsetto-heavy ballad" helps set the scene on Donda and also described it as "sultry". Spencer Kornhaber of The Atlantic lauded West for channeling his older material with the song, providing "808s & Heartbreak wistfulness".

Certain reviewers were less appreciative of the song's inclusion on Donda. David Aaron Brake from HipHopDX said that the song is among the album's highlights, but felt that even the best tracks on the album are diminished by its "hefty but mostly tepid 27-song tracklist". The New York Times journalist Jon Caramanica felt that the song seems drowsy and "purely decorative" on the album. In a highly negative review for Rolling Stone, Paul Thompson labeled "the embarrassingly soupy" song as the lowest moment of Donda.

== Lawsuit ==
On July 17, 2024, Artist Revenue Advocates (ARA) filed a lawsuit against West on behalf of Khalil Abdul-Rahman Hazzard, Sam Barsh, Dan Seeff, and Josh Mease in a Los Angeles Court for copyright infringement. The lawsuit cited usage of elements from "MSD PT2" on "Moon" and fellow Donda track "Hurricane"; the work was recorded by the four musicians for a composer pack and offered for purchase in 2018. West requested permission for usage and ARA refused to give him a license, accusing him of "blatant brazenness" for crediting Hazzard under his stage name of DJ Khalil on the tracks regardless. Attorneys for ARA issued a statement that the lawsuit focuses on "the rights of artists, musicians, and songwriters" for determining the publishing and usage of their works. They continued that "intellectual property owners" should have a decision in exploitation of their material and the ability to "prevent shameless infringers from simply stealing". The four musicians had unsuccessfully attempted for the three years after the release of "Moon" and "Hurricane" to collect their share of the profits; listening events where the songs were played had earned US$14 million and they had earned US$15 million in streaming revenue by March 1, 2024. The lawsuit identified its defendants as West, Universal Music Group, GOOD Music, and Yeezy LLC, among others, requesting for a court decision over copyright infringement, damages, an award of costs, and any further relief.

On February 26, 2026, the judge presiding over the case dropped the majority of copyright infringement claims against West, as both the ARA's musicology expert and sample-detection tests showed that no direct audio samples of "MSD PT2" were used in the final versions of "Hurricane and "Moon"; the remaining trial focused solely on the song's use in earlier versions of "Hurricane", for which West had to pay US$438,000 in damages for using "MSD PT 2" during a listening party event for Donda.

== Commercial performance ==
Upon the release of Donda, "Moon" debuted at number 17 on the US Billboard Hot 100. The song simultaneously entered at number six on both the US Christian Songs and Gospel Songs charts. It further reached number seven on the US Hot R&B/Hip-Hop Songs chart, placing among West's seven simultaneous top-10 hits that led to him tying Drake's record on the chart. On July 11, 2022, "Moon" was certified platinum by the Recording Industry Association of America (RIAA) for pushing 1,000,000 certified units in the United States. This came eight months after it was certified gold and marked one of West's two album tracks to achieve a new RIAA certification that week, alongside "Ghost Town" (2018).

In Canada, the song charted at number 21 on the Canadian Hot 100. On November 23, 2021, it received a gold certification from Music Canada for pushing 40,000 units in Canada. The song was most successful in New Zealand, reaching number nine on the NZ Singles Chart. In Australia, it entered the ARIA Singles Chart at number 15. The song performed similarly in Iceland, debuting at number 12 on the Icelandic Singles Chart. It reached numbers 22 and 23 on the Danish Track Top-40 and Norwegian Topp 20 Singles charts, respectively. Top-40 positions were also attained by the song in Lithuania, Ireland, and Portugal, On September 6, 2024, it was certified silver by the British Phonographic Industry for shelving 200,000 units in the United Kingdom. The song charted at number 20 on the Billboard Global 200.

== Credits and personnel ==
Credits adapted from Tidal.

- Kanye West – producer, songwriter
- E.Vax – producer, songwriter
- BoogzDaBeast – co-producer, songwriter
- DJ Khalil – co-producer, songwriter
- Caleb Zackery Toliver – songwriter
- Scott Mescudi – songwriter
- Malik Yusef – songwriter
- Irko – mastering engineer, mix engineer
- Alejandro Rodriguez-Dawsøn – recording engineer
- Drrique Rendeer – recording engineer
- James Kelso – recording engineer
- Josh Berg – recording engineer
- Mikalai Skrobat – recording engineer
- Roark Bailey – recording engineer
- Will Chason – assistant recording engineer
- Louis Bell – vocal editing
- Patrick Hundley – vocal editing

== Charts ==
=== Weekly charts ===
Chart performance for "Moon"
Chart (2021)	Peak position
Australia (ARIA)	15
Canada Hot 100 (Billboard)	21
Denmark (Tracklisten)	22
France (SNEP)	103
Global 200 (Billboard)	20
Greece International (IFPI)	59
Iceland (Tónlistinn)	12
Ireland (IRMA)	36
Lithuania (AGATA)	26
New Zealand (Recorded Music NZ)	9
Norway (VG-lista)	23
Portugal (AFP)	39
Slovakia Singles Digital (ČNS IFPI)	72
South Africa (TOSAC)	9
Sweden (Sverigetopplistan)	45
UK Singles (Official Charts)	83
US Billboard Hot 100	17
US Hot Christian Songs (Billboard)	6
US Gospel Songs (Billboard)	6
US Hot R&B/Hip-Hop Songs (Billboard)	7

=== Year-end charts ===
2021 year-end chart performance for "Moon"
Chart (2021)	Position
US Christian Songs (Billboard)	10
US Gospel Songs (Billboard)	2

== Certifications ==
Certifications for "Moon"
Region	Certification	Certified units/sales
Canada (Music Canada)	Gold	40,000^{‡}
New Zealand (RMNZ)	Platinum	30,000^{‡}
United Kingdom (BPI)	Silver	200,000^{‡}
United States (RIAA)	Platinum	1,000,000^{‡}
^{‡} Sales+streaming figures based on certification alone.

== Notes and references ==
Notes

Citations
