= Kids See Ghosts =

American hip-hop duo (2018–2022)

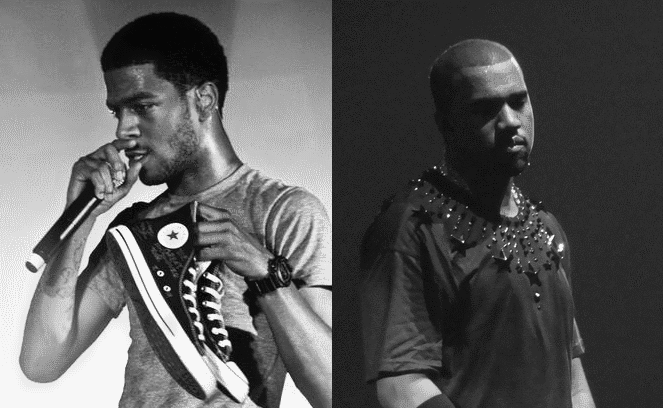
- Kid Cudi (left) and Kanye West (right), the two members of Kids See Ghosts

Background information
- Origin: Jackson Hole, Wyoming, U.S.
- Genres: Alternative hip-hop; psychedelic; rap rock
- Years active: 2018–2022
- Labels: GOOD; Def Jam; Wicked Awesome
- Past members: Kanye West; Kid Cudi

Kids See Ghosts (stylized in all caps) were an American hip-hop superduo composed of rappers Kanye West and Kid Cudi. Formed during West's 2018 Wyoming sessions, the duo's only album, Kids See Ghosts, was released in June of that year by Def Jam Recordings, along with their respective label imprints, GOOD Music and Wicked Awesome Records. A critical and commercial success, the album peaked at number two on the US Billboard 200 and received gold certification by the Recording Industry Association of America (RIAA). Despite a planned sequel and television series, the duo disbanded in 2022 due to personal disagreements, but have maintained an on-again, off-again relationship.

== History ==
=== Background and beginnings ===
In 2006, aspiring artist Kid Cudi first met rapper-producer Kanye West in a Virgin Megastore, as Cudi recounted in a 2009 Spin interview: "I was looking at CDs, saw the gleam of a Jesus piece in the right side of my eye, looked up, and it was Kanye West," Cudi said, adding that he introduced himself and offered West some of his music. Cudi would later run into West again, while Cudi was working at the BAPE store in NYC: "I remember Kanye coming in one time and I was helping him get a couple things," Cudi said. "I forgot to take a sensor off of one of the jackets he bought and I had to run out the store to catch him before he left. Pretty funny me chasing after him in SoHo."

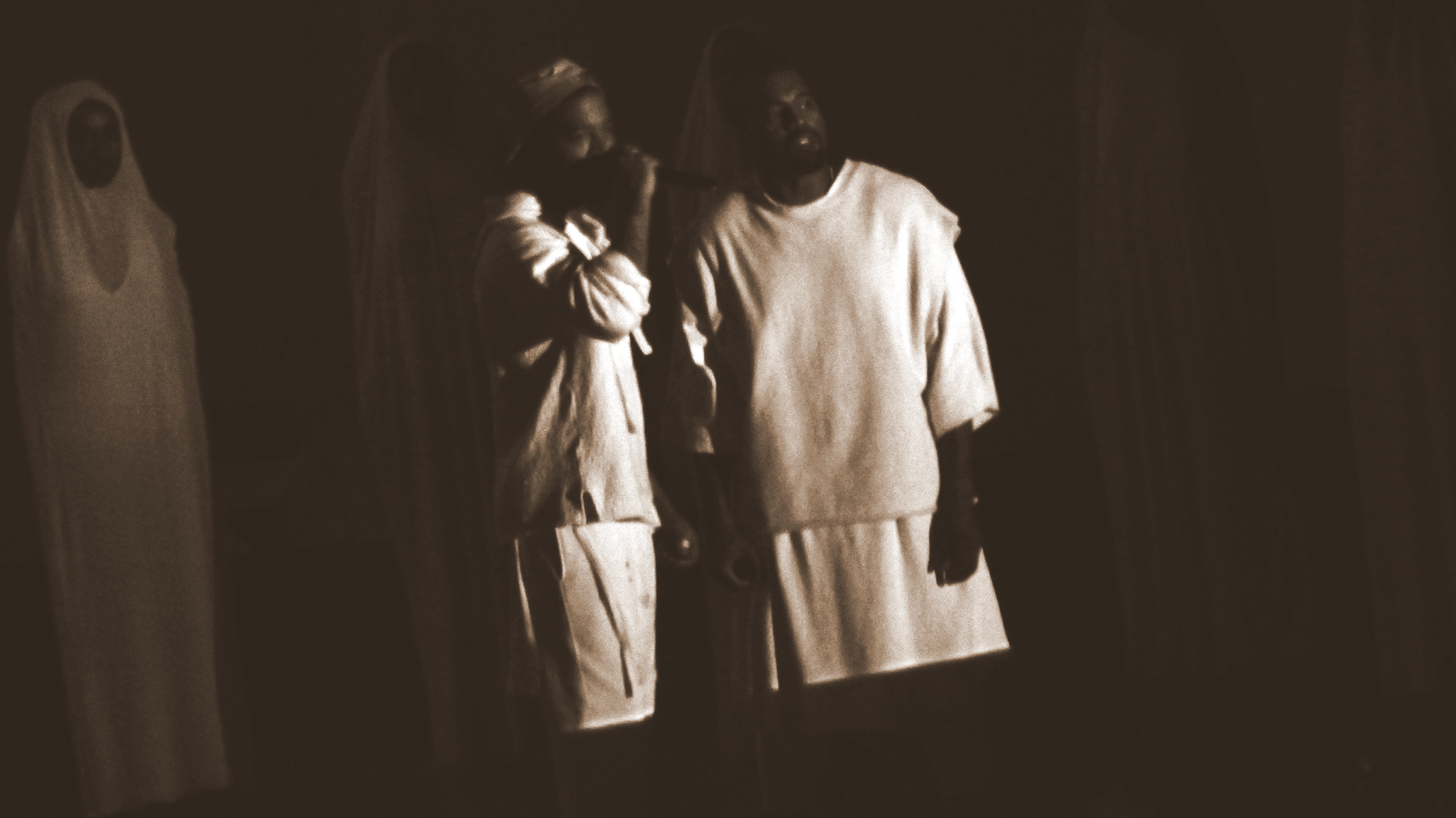
Kid Cudi (left) and Kanye West performing 808s & Heartbreak at the Hollywood Bowl

In 2008, Kid Cudi caught the attention of Kanye West's A&R, Plain Pat, who had initially met Cudi at a Def Jam meeting and picked up a copy of his demo. Plain Pat introduced Cudi's music to West, leading West to sign Cudi to his GOOD Music imprint later that year. Cudi began working closely with West. West first called upon Cudi to write hooks for American rapper Jay-Z, and while in the studio Cudi and West went from working on The Blueprint 3 (2009) to West's R&B-esque fourth solo album, 808s & Heartbreak (2008). Cudi's assistance included co-writing credits or vocals on "Heartless," "Welcome to Heartbreak," "Paranoid" and "RoboCop." Cudi proved to be a prominent songwriter and featured artist on 808s & Heartbreak, with "Paranoid" and "Heartless" being released as singles, while "Welcome to Heartbreak" charted as an album cut and peaked at number 87 on the Pop 100.

The two continued to work on Cudi's debut album Man on the Moon: The End of Day (2009), with West serving as an executive producer. West had also produced two songs, namely "Sky Might Fall" and the Common-assisted third single "Make Her Say", which also featured West. By 2018, Cudi had contributed to every West album since 2008, with their 2016 effort "Father Stretch My Hands" reaching the Top 40 of the US Billboard Hot 100 chart.

After a brief fallout, the two reconnected in late 2016, around the dissolution of West's Saint Pablo Tour, which ended in him being hospitalized. West abruptly canceled his Saint Pablo Tour and sought hospitalization for exhaustion in November 2016. At that time, West's only two live appearances since had both been with Cudi, who also sought mental health treatment in the fall of 2016, for performances of "Father Stretch My Hands Pt. 1" in November 2017 and February.

=== Formation and debut ===
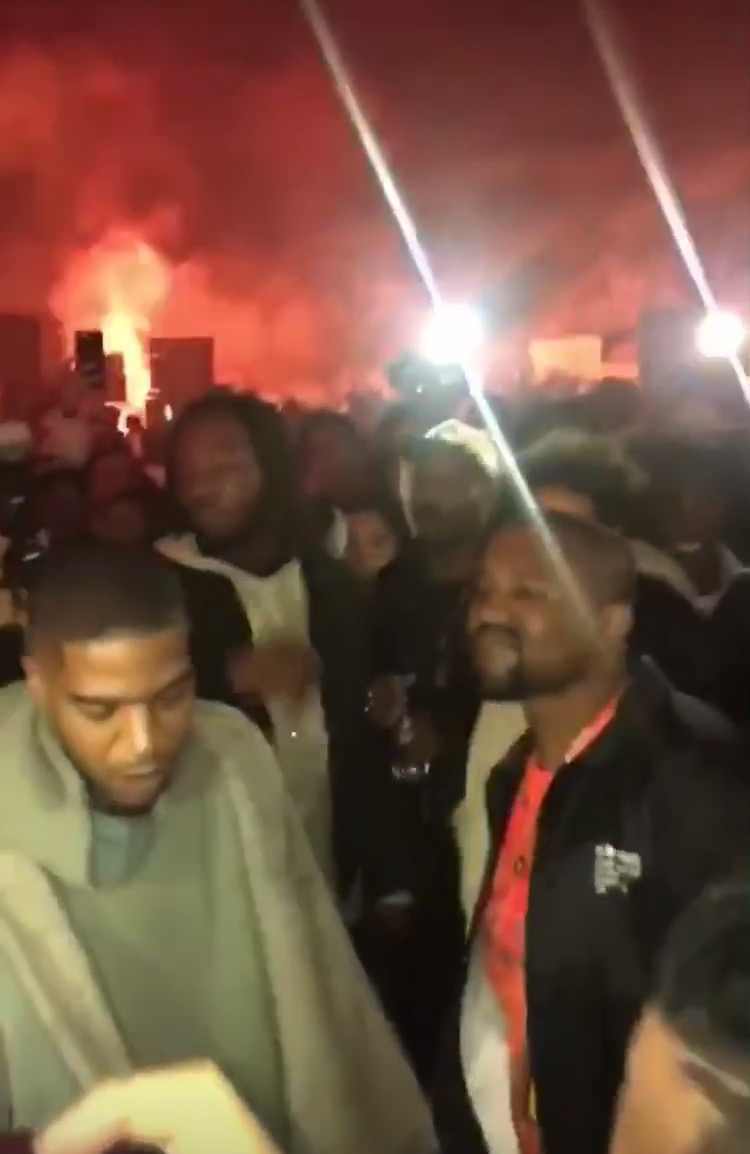
Kids See Ghosts at their studio album's listening party in Southern California in 2018, backed by a bonfire.

On April 19, 2018, West announced via Twitter that a collaborative album with Kid Cudi would be released in June. He followed the tweet revealing the name of the group, which also serves as title of their debut album, Kids See Ghosts. On April 22, again via Twitter, West unveiled the album artwork, which was composed by Tokyo-based artist Takashi Murakami. The duo were originally photographed with Murakami in July 2017. On April 25, West revealed the album would be accompanied by a short film, directed by Dexter Navy, a music video director notable for his collaborations with the Neighbourhood and ASAP Rocky.

On June 8, their first album Kids See Ghosts was released following a live listening party in Santa Clarita, California. Kids See Ghosts debuted at number two on the US Billboard 200 chart with 142,000 album-equivalent units, of which 79,000 were pure album sales. It serves as West's tenth top-five album and Cudi's sixth top-five album in the United States. All seven tracks on the album debuted in the Billboard Hot 100 chart. The track "Reborn" managed to chart in the Top 40 of the US Hot 100, at number 39.

Cudi revealed in July 2018, that he and West will continue to release music as Kids See Ghosts. "There are some songs that we didn't use that I'm hopeful we can put out later," Cudi explained in an interview with Billboard. "But the plan is to do more Kids See Ghosts albums... We just have this chemistry that's undeniable, especially when we have to fight for it with each other."

The duo made their live debut under the moniker at Tyler, the Creator's Camp Flog Gnaw Carnival on November 11, 2018. They performed their album in entirety as well as the Cudi-featured West songs "Father Stretch My Hands Pt. 1", "Welcome to Heartbreak", "Paranoid", and "Ghost Town", and Cudi's single "Pursuit of Happiness." At Cudi's 2019 Coachella set, West joined him onstage for performances of "Feel the Love", "Reborn", "Father Stretch My Hands Pt. 1", "Ghost Town", and "Ghost Town Pt. 2". 070 Shake and Ty Dolla Sign, frequent collaborators of the duo, came onstage for their features on the latter two songs.

=== Unreleased projects ===
==== Kids See Ghosts 2 ====
In a September 2019 interview with Complex, Kid Cudi assured fans that more material from him and Kanye West would be coming. "There will be more Kids See Ghosts albums. Kanye already told me he wants to start working on the second one," he said. "With the first album, I didn't know how serious he was about making a collab album with me," he continued. "He had mentioned it, but I thought it was just a good idea he had in the moment. But then he kept bringing it up and kept having me come to his house, listen to music, and work on beats, so I was like, 'Wow, he's really into this.' We had a discussion where he said he wanted to make a spiritual album and I told him, 'Great. That's what I do. I would love to do that, something I can sink my teeth into.' So there will definitely be more."

==== Animated series ====
On June 26, 2020, a computer-animated series directed by artist Takashi Murakami was announced via social media. The series chronicles the adventures of the Dropout Bear, the character portrayed on West's first three album covers, and Kid Fox, a character created exclusively for the show, both of whom acting as cartoon personae for the artists. The show currently has no scheduled release date and is unlikely to air due to the group's split.

=== 2022–present ===
Kid Cudi performing alongside West on the latter's Ye Live Concert Tour in 2026.

On April 19, 2022, exactly four years after the announcement of the group, Kid Cudi announced that "Rock n Roll", on Pusha T's fourth album It's Almost Dry, would be his final collaboration with West due to the latter artist's recent behaviour, therefore dissolving the duo's partnership. Cudi stated on Twitter that "I did this song a year ago when I was still cool [with] Kanye. I am not cool [with] that man. He's not my friend and I only cleared the song for Pusha cuz [sic] thats my guy. This is the last song [you] will hear me on [with] Kanye." In December 2023, the two temporarily reconciled, with Cudi appearing at a listening session for West's Vultures 1 and later appearing on the track "Gun to My Head" from West's Vultures 2. Cudi stated in a January 2024 interview that he forgave West because "he apologized to me and it was sincere" and "Kanye does not apologize to anybody and say sorry to anyone." However, in an August 2025 interview, Cudi stated "[West] said some things that there's just no coming back from [...] the comments that he's had about Virgil Abloh are just some of the most evil, vile, disturbing, fucked-up things I've heard [...] There's no coming back from that, man. I'm done with you[,]" effectively concluding his association with West.

On April 28, 2026, Kid Cudi dedicated a performance of "Reborn" to West during his Rebel Ragers Tour. Amid the performance, he instructed his fans, saying, "We gotta sing this loud so Ye can hear you." Cudi along with West performed "Father Stretch My Hands" and "Ghost Town" on the second night of West concert's in Chicago on September 4, 2026.

== Discography ==
=== Studio albums ===
List of studio albums, with release date, label, selected chart positions, sales, and certifications shown
| Title | Album details | Peak chart positions | | | | | | | Sales | Certifications |
| Title | Album details | US | AUS | CAN | NOR | NZ | SWE | UK | Sales | Certifications |
|---|---|---|---|---|---|---|---|---|---|---|
| Kids See Ghosts | Released: June 8, 2018; Label: GOOD, Def Jam, Wicked Awesome; Format: CD, LP, digital download, streaming | 2 | 4 | 3 | 3 | 3 | 13 | 7 | US: 142,000 | RIAA: Gold; BPI: Silver |

=== Charted songs ===
List of non-single chart appearances, with year released and album name shown
| Title | Year | Peak chart positions | | | | | | | | Certifications | Album |
| Title | Year | US | US R&B/HH | AUS | CAN | IRE | NZ Heat. | SWE Heat. | UK | Certifications | Album |
|---|---|---|---|---|---|---|---|---|---|---|---|
| "Feel the Love" (featuring Pusha T) | 2018 | 47 | 24 | 57 | 35 | 50 | — | 19 | 47 | RIAA: Gold | Kids See Ghosts |
| "Fire" | 2018 | 67 | 32 | 69 | 49 | 58 | — | — | — | RIAA: Gold | Kids See Ghosts |
| "4th Dimension" (featuring Louis Prima) | 2018 | 42 | 21 | 46 | 27 | 49 | 1 | 20 | 46 | RIAA: Platinum | Kids See Ghosts |
| "Freeee (Ghost Town, Pt. 2)" (featuring Ty Dolla Sign) | 2018 | 62 | 30 | 72 | 58 | 66 | — | — | — | | Kids See Ghosts |
| "Reborn" | 2018 | 39 | 18 | 55 | 30 | 48 | 2 | 1 | 48 | RIAA: Platinum; BPI: Silver | Kids See Ghosts |
| "Kids See Ghosts" (featuring Yasiin Bey) | 2018 | 73 | 37 | 84 | 53 | 64 | — | — | — | RIAA: Gold | Kids See Ghosts |
| "Cudi Montage" (featuring Mr. Hudson) | 2018 | 69 | 34 | 89 | 61 | 67 | — | — | — | RIAA: Gold | Kids See Ghosts |

=== Appearances together ===
| Title | Year | Artist(s) | Album |
|---|---|---|---|
| "Welcome to Heartbreak" | 2008 | Kanye West, Kid Cudi | 808s & Heartbreak |
| "Paranoid" | 2008 | Kanye West, Mr Hudson, Kid Cudi | 808s & Heartbreak |
| "Make Her Say" | 2009 | Kid Cudi, Kanye West, Common | Man on the Moon: The End of Day |
| "GOOD Friday" | 2010 | Kanye West, Kid Cudi, Big Sean, Pusha T, Common, Charlie Wilson | GOOD Fridays |
| "Christian Dior Denim Flow" | 2010 | Kanye West, Kid Cudi, John Legend, Pusha T, Lloyd Banks, Ryan Leslie | GOOD Fridays |
| "The Joy" | 2010 | Kanye West, Kid Cudi, Pete Rock, Charlie Wilson, Curtis Mayfield, Jay-Z | GOOD Fridays |
| "Gorgeous" | 2010 | Kanye West, Kid Cudi, Raekwon | My Beautiful Dark Twisted Fantasy |
| "All of the Lights" | 2010 | Kanye West, Kid Cudi, Rihanna, Fergie | My Beautiful Dark Twisted Fantasy |
| "Welcome to the World" | 2010 | T.I., Kanye West, Kid Cudi | No Mercy |
| "Wild'n Cuz I'm Young" | 2010 | Kid Cudi, Kanye West | Non-album single |
| "Erase Me" | 2010 | Kid Cudi, Kanye West | Man on the Moon II: The Legend of Mr. Rager |
| "Gotta Have It" | 2011 | Kanye West, Jay-Z, Kid Cudi | Watch the Throne |
| "Murder to Excellence" | 2011 | Kanye West, Jay-Z, Kid Cudi | Watch the Throne |
| "Illest Motherfucker Alive" | 2011 | Kanye West, Jay-Z, Kid Cudi, Bankuli, Aude Cardona | Watch the Throne |
| "The Joy" | 2011 | Kanye West, Jay-Z, Kid Cudi, Charlie Wilson, Pete Rock | Watch the Throne |
| "Guilt Trip" | 2013 | Kanye West, Kid Cudi | Yeezus |
| "Father Stretch My Hands, Pt. 1" | 2016 | Kanye West, Kid Cudi, Kelly Price | The Life of Pablo |
| "Waves" | 2016 | Kanye West, Kid Cudi, Chris Brown | The Life of Pablo |
| "Can't Look in My Eyes" | 2016 | Kanye West, Kid Cudi | Non-album single |
| "No Mistakes" | 2018 | Kanye West, Kid Cudi, Charlie Wilson, Caroline Shaw | Ye |
| "Ghost Town" | 2018 | Kanye West, Kid Cudi, PartyNextDoor, 070 Shake | Ye |
| "Moon" | 2021 | Kanye West, Kid Cudi, Don Toliver | Donda |
| "Remote Control, Pt. 2" | 2021 | Kanye West, Kid Cudi, Young Thug | Donda (Deluxe) |
| "Rock n Roll" | 2022 | Pusha T, Kanye West, Kid Cudi | It's Almost Dry |
| "Gun to My Head" | 2024 | ¥$, Kid Cudi | Vultures 2 (Digital Deluxe) |

== See also ==
- List of songs recorded by Kanye West
- List of songs recorded by Kid Cudi
