= The Suzan =

All-female pop rock band

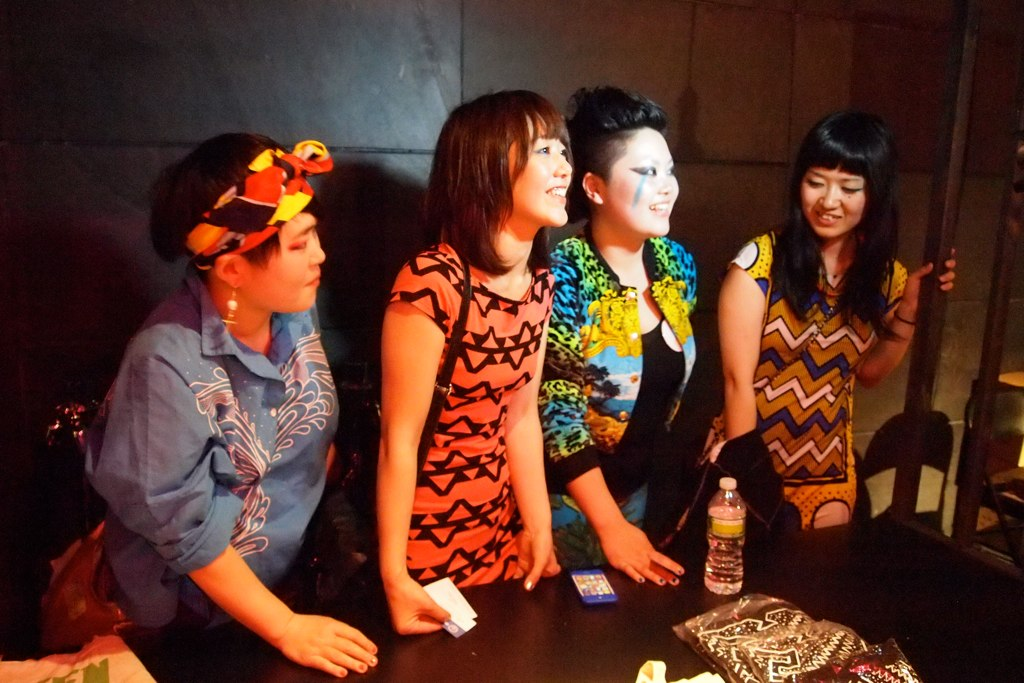
The Suzan in 2012

The Suzan are an all-female pop rock band from Japan formed in 2004. It consists of the sisters Rie and Saori and friends Nico. Their music is considered multi-genre, with elements of pop, wild dance, punk, and garage rock. The Suzan's song "Come Come" gained notoriety for playing in Verizon Wireless advertisement for the NFL 2011. With their album Golden Week For The Poco Poco Beat (at indie label Fool's Gold Records, 2010), they started a collaboration with Swedish musician and producer Björn Yttling from Peter Bjorn and John, which are among the many bands they have been touring with internationally.

== Members ==
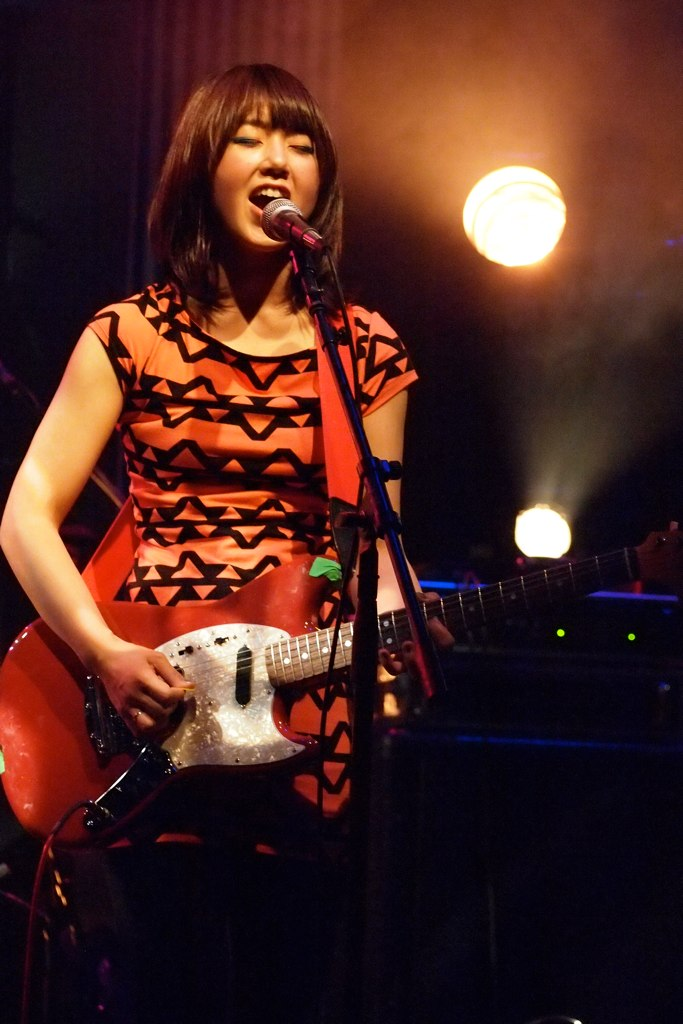

- Rie - keyboards, guitar
- Saori - vocals, guitar
- Nico - percussion

== Former members ==
- Ikue - bass

== Discography ==
=== Albums ===
- 2006: Suzan Galaxy
- 2010: Golden Week For The Poco Poco Beat

=== EPs ===
- 2004: Suzan Kingdom
