= Welcome to Heartbreak =

2008 song by Kanye West featuring Kid Cudi

Song by Kanye West featuring Kid Cudi

from the album 808s & Heartbreak
- Released: November 24, 2008
- Recorded: 2008
- Studio: Glenwood (Burbank, California); Avex Recording (Honolulu, Hawaii)
- Genre: Pop rap
- Length: 4:23
- Label: Roc-A-Fella; Def Jam
- Songwriters: Kanye West; Jeff Bhasker; Patrick Reynolds; Scott Mescudi
- Producer: Kanye West

Music video
- "Welcome to Heartbreak" on YouTube

"Welcome to Heartbreak" is a song by American rapper Kanye West, from his fourth studio album, 808s & Heartbreak (2008). The song features a guest appearance from Kid Cudi on his first collaboration with West, as well as background vocals by Jeff Bhasker. All three co-wrote the song alongside Plain Pat, who co-produced it with West and Bhasker. The inspiration behind the song was a conversation West had with Dave Sirulnick, who showed him some pictures of his children. A hip pop number, it has electronic instrumentation that is reliant on piano. In the lyrics of the song, West mentions trying to fill the lack of substance in his life with extravagant materialistic items.

"Welcome to Heartbreak" received generally positive reviews from music critics, who mostly highlighted West's lyrical content. Some were complimentary towards the composition, while a few critics praised Kid Cudi's contributions. The song reached numbers 87 and 27 on the US Pop 100 and UK R&B charts in 2008 and 2009, respectively. It has since been certified gold in the United States by the Recording Industry Association of America (RIAA). West and Kid Cudi first performed the song live for South by Southwest (SXSW) in March 2009. An accompanying music video was released on February 18, 2009, which features pixelation that was created through data moshing. The video received lukewarm responses from critics, who praised its visual effects but questioned its originality.

== Background and development ==
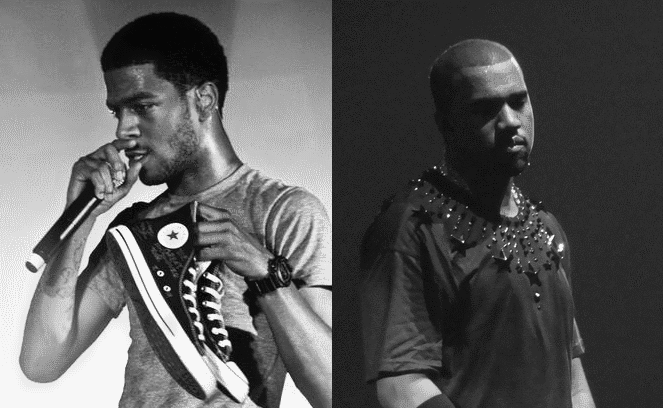
After first working together on the song, Cudi and West (pictured left and right, respectively) became frequent musical collaborators.

West and fellow rapper Kid Cudi first met each other at a Virgin Megastore in 2004, with the meeting including Cudi asking West to sign him; West respectfully declined his request, though the rapper told him: "I have the potential for greatness." After being sent Kid Cudi's 2008 debut mixtape A Kid Named Cudi by producer Plain Pat, West arrived at the mixtape's listening party and took Cudi under his wing. The rapper subsequently co-wrote several songs for 808s & Heartbreak in Hawaii with West, including "Heartless" and "Paranoid". (Note: Recording took place at Avex Recording Studio in Honolulu, Hawaii for the album.) Cudi has been believed to have directly influenced the album's sound, which West himself confirmed to be true. "Welcome to Heartbreak" marked the first collaboration between the two artists; Cudi's background vocals on "Paranoid" led him to sign a record deal with West's record label GOOD Music. West and Cudi later collaborated on many other tracks, including "Gorgeous" (2010) and "Father Stretch My Hands, Pt. 1" (2016). They went on to form a duo under the name of Kids See Ghosts, releasing their debut studio album of the same name on June 8, 2018.

In the 2009 book Chicken Soup for the Soul: The Story Behind The Song, West recalls that the song was inspired by a conversation between himself and MTV producer Dave Sirulnick. He writes that the conversation involved Sirulnick presenting photographs of his children to West, with the photos prompting an image used in the song. West further pens about how he wishes to get married and have a family, but numerous reasons in his life have kept him from doing so; he classifies the song as "the first time a rap artist spoke condescendingly about property, possessions like a sports car". West elaborates, "People are so concerned with what they have or what other people have instead of what's really important – other people." The artist goes on to explain that while items such as cars are often used to showcase people having made it, he believes "there is nothing more important than home and family". In an interview for American singer Pharrell Williams' OTHERtone show on July 10, 2016, Kid Cudi revealed the song's hook originated from a melody he wrote for fellow rapper Jay-Z's eleventh studio album The Blueprint 3 (2009). He explained to Williams that he "[was] like, Oh, it's for Jay, let's talk about that dope boy shit, let's make a theme for that dope boy in the kitchen". During this time, the song was known as "Cookin' Up." "Welcome to Heartbreak" was recorded during the three week period that West worked on the entirety of 808s & Heartbreak in 2008.

== Composition and lyrics ==
"Welcome to Heartbreak"
A 20-second sample of "Welcome to Heartbreak", featuring the song's sparse piano-driven instrumentation, which includes viola, bass, loud synths, and pounding tom-tom drums. West sings in Auto-Tune about struggling to find normal lives relatable due to being famous, before he uses the same technique to deliver falsetto coos on the hook that are combined with Kid Cudi's crooning about painful visualizations.

Musically, "Welcome to Heartbreak" is a hip pop number, with electronic instrumentation. The song heavily relies on sparse piano, contributed by Ken Lewis. It also contains violin, viola, bass, synths, and tom-tom drums. The song's intro utilizes a cello that was played by James J. Cooper, III alongside Jennie Lorenzo, and was described by The Washington Post as reminiscent of an organ. For the majority of the song, West sings through Auto-Tune. Kid Cudi croons on its hook, being accompanied by West performing falsetto coos. Shortly after the four minute mark, West quickly utters the hook. Background vocals from Bhasker are featured on the song.

In the lyrics of "Welcome to Heartbreak", West addresses attempting to fill his life's lack of substance with lavish materialistic items, expressing a struggle to relate to a normal lifestyle as a result of his fame. West admits that it feels painful for him to merely get "a sports car", desiring to have "a report card" instead. On the hook, Kid Cudi croons about painful visualizations. West echoes the rapper by singing the line "I can't stop having these visions" towards the end of the song, alluding to the death of his own mother.

== Release and reception ==
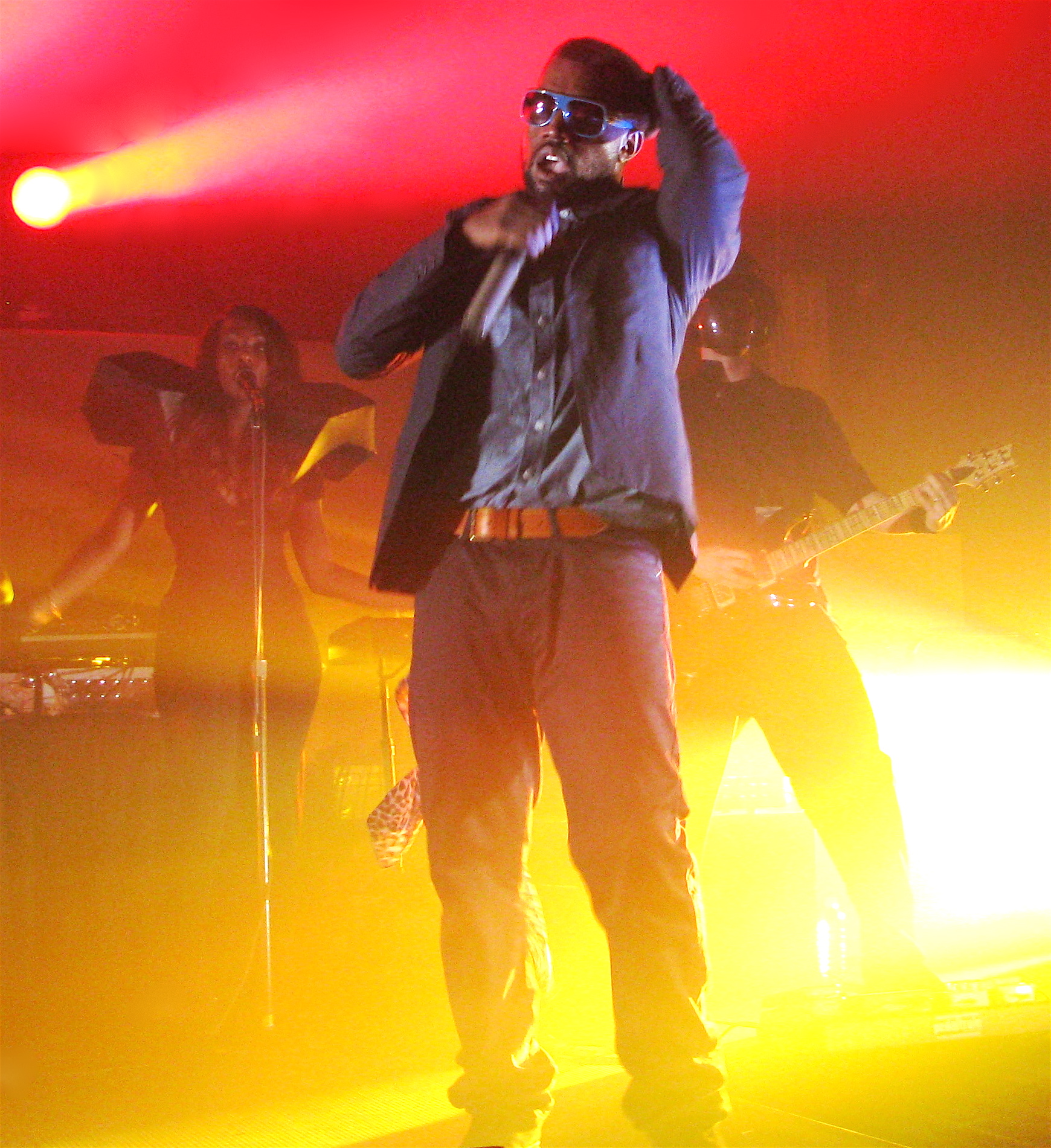
Numerous reviewers highlighted West's vocals on the song, mostly focusing on his lyricism.

On November 24, 2008, "Welcome to Heartbreak" was released as the second track on West's fourth studio album 808s & Heartbreak. West clarified over his blog that, despite a music video being released for the song on February 18, 2009, "Amazing" was the track set for release as the next single from the album. "Welcome to Heartbreak" was met with generally positive reviews from music critics. Writing for Urb, Brandon Perkins commented that the song is where West sets "his prized possessions against the simplicity of 'real life'", noting he uses a "disconnected yearning" to mark his juxtapositions. In Consequence, Alex Young complimented West's personal style of lyricism on the song for marking "a sweeping departure" from the stereotypical lyrical content of most popular hip hop songs in 2008. Adam Conner-Simons from musicOMH observed how West does not "hold back" on the song, using the lyrics for "reflecting on his party-heavy lifestyle and envying his friends' picket-fence existences". Reviewing for IGN, Alfred H. Leonard, III stated that West is assisted by Kid Cudi in struggling "to relate to the fruits of living a normal life" due to having a celebrity lifestyle. H. Leonard, III viewed the lyrical content as "intriguing" for showcasing a hip hop artist delving into "the negative side of fame" in 2008, a year in which he thought "many of [the] lyrics are centered around trumpeting the spoils that come with stardom". At PopMatters, Dave Heaton wrote that even though West tells "highly specific" stories "about life as a lonely celebrity" on the song, "it's the tone of the story that leaves the impression", rather than the actual stories told, while he also remarked how West "turns the vocal effects off to sound naked, vulnerable".

Josh Eells of Blender honored the song as "so icy and desolate" that "a pair of snowshoes" should accompany it. The staff of NME pointed to the song's "tortured opening cello groans" as providing clearness that West still possessed "his marbles" in 2008, following on from disappointing events in the artist's career throughout the year. They further noticed how "a cold, metallic bleakness" is present on the song, which invokes "cinematic flashes" in the manner of the 1987 film The Running Man that stars Arnold Schwarzenegger, as well as empowering "the woe-is-me slush". Voicing a less positive response, Wilson McBee from Slant Magazine was thankful for Kid Cudi's "anxious cooing" on the song, which serves as "a perfect counter" to what he dubbed "West's attenuated sketches about fame and self-loathing". In a mixed review of "Welcome to Heartbreak" for Digital Spy, Mayer Nissim called the song an "introspective slice of hip-pop" mostly performed via Auto-Tune and said that despite there being nothing wrong "with West using the available technology to transform his voice", it has become "horribly ubiquitous" in the years leading up to 2009. He elaborated, glorifying the "beautifully understated" beat and labeling the song's lyrics "fine", but pushed for it being hard not to worry that the Auto-Tune "give[s] the track a 'Made In 2008' stamp that could make it close to unlistenable in a few years' time".

For the issue dated December 13, 2008, "Welcome to Heartbreak" debuted and peaked at number 87 on the US Billboard Pop 100. On September 23, 2020, the song was certified gold by the Recording Industry Association of America (RIAA) for pushing 500,000 certified units in the United States. In the United Kingdom, "Welcome to Heartbreak" debuted at number 112 on the UK Singles Chart for the issue dated April 12, 2009. One week prior, the song closed out the component UK R&B Chart by entering at number 40. In the same week as its debut on the UK Singles Chart, the song rose two places to number 38 on the component chart. For the issue date of April 26, 2009, it climbed 11 places to peak at number 27 on the UK R&B Chart. After the song had fallen down the chart to number 35 two weeks later, it remained at this position through to the next week. The song climbed the UK R&B Chart again for the May 24, 2009 issue, reaching number 33 in its seventh week.

== Music video ==
=== Background ===
The music video for "Welcome to Heartbreak" was released on February 18, 2009, via West's blog, and was directed by Nabil Elderkin, who received credit mononymously under his forename. The video was filmed in late October 2008. At the time, Nabil was working with West on the photo book for the artist's Glow in the Dark Tour at the time. He had previously directed the visual for West's "Champion" (2007), as well as appearing in Hawaii during the recording of 808s & Heartbreak. In a blog post accompanying the video, West revealed it had been worked on for the past month and that he was "forced" to put the visual out due to "another video out there using the same technique". West was referring to the video for American synth-pop band Chairlift's "Evident Utensil", directed by Ray Tintori; Nabil dubbed it as "data moshing" in an MTV News interview on February 18, 2009. He further pointed out Takeshi Murata as being the most notable of the numerous artists who had used the technique, while explaining that he used data moshing "to convey the haunting element of ['Welcome to Heartbreak']", aiming for "more of [a] strategic way" than Murata by using certain features for adding to the effect. Nabil said that, due to differing parts of the song representing differing feelings, it was of desire "to come with a visual representation of the flow and textures" which felt "very important" in the song to him. He elaborated, recalling shooting certain scenes "in super-slow-motion" with the Phantom merely for "transitional movement and textures", going on to state he was certain the song needed a music video. Of creating the video, Nabil recounted West taking a liking to his initially presented idea, before he "nagged" the artist slightly about it. According to him, West fully agreed on recording the music video after Nabil restated to him that it "would be a great [accompanying] visual", with the latter having a heavy schedule of related phone calls that led to the video's creation in New York. He finalized that "all the extra components" were shot afterwards in Los Angeles, as well as praising the inspiration taken by him from West's creativity during the process.

=== Synopsis and reception ===
A snapshot of the music video, showing West pixelated as he wears a Bill Cosby sweater.

The music video applies the data moshing technique of pixelation to West, who wears a Bill Cosby sweater. Calculated moshes, colors, and textures are included, which add to the effect. Other digital distortions are also featured in the video, conveying the troubled mental state that West presents with the song itself. It also contains slow-motion footage, as well as compression artifacts.

The video was met with moderately positive responses from critics. Chad Jordan, for Hypebeast, said the music video "utilizes vivid colors and graphics" for matching the mood of "Welcome to Heartbreak", and felt assured it "would surely get constant rotation on every video channel" if the song experienced a single release. Steven Gottlieb from VideoStatic opined that the clip demonstrates how data moshing "can be used in the context of a broader music video" than the one for Chairlift's "Evident Utensil", while saying the technique is used to communicate the manner to which "a brain and your emotions may be just as susceptible to interference and static and distortions as any piece of videotaped footage or digital data". Amrit Singh of Stereogum called the video "[p]retty rad", but admitted that it was not the first visual to use pixelation as "the internet cares about". In a mixed review, Vulture's Mark Graham explained that the clip "could very well have been" West's great music video, but the technology present being used in the "Evident Utensil" video prevented this from happening. Graham concluded by crediting West over "the killer Cosby sweater", yet assuming he should go "back to the drawing board".

=== Credits and personnel ===
Credits adapted from VideoStatic.

Filming

- Produced by Partizan

Personnel

- Nabil – director, display picture
- Kathleen Heffernan – production
- Keely Gould – production
- Josh Reis – display picture
- Ryan Bartley – editor

== Live performances ==
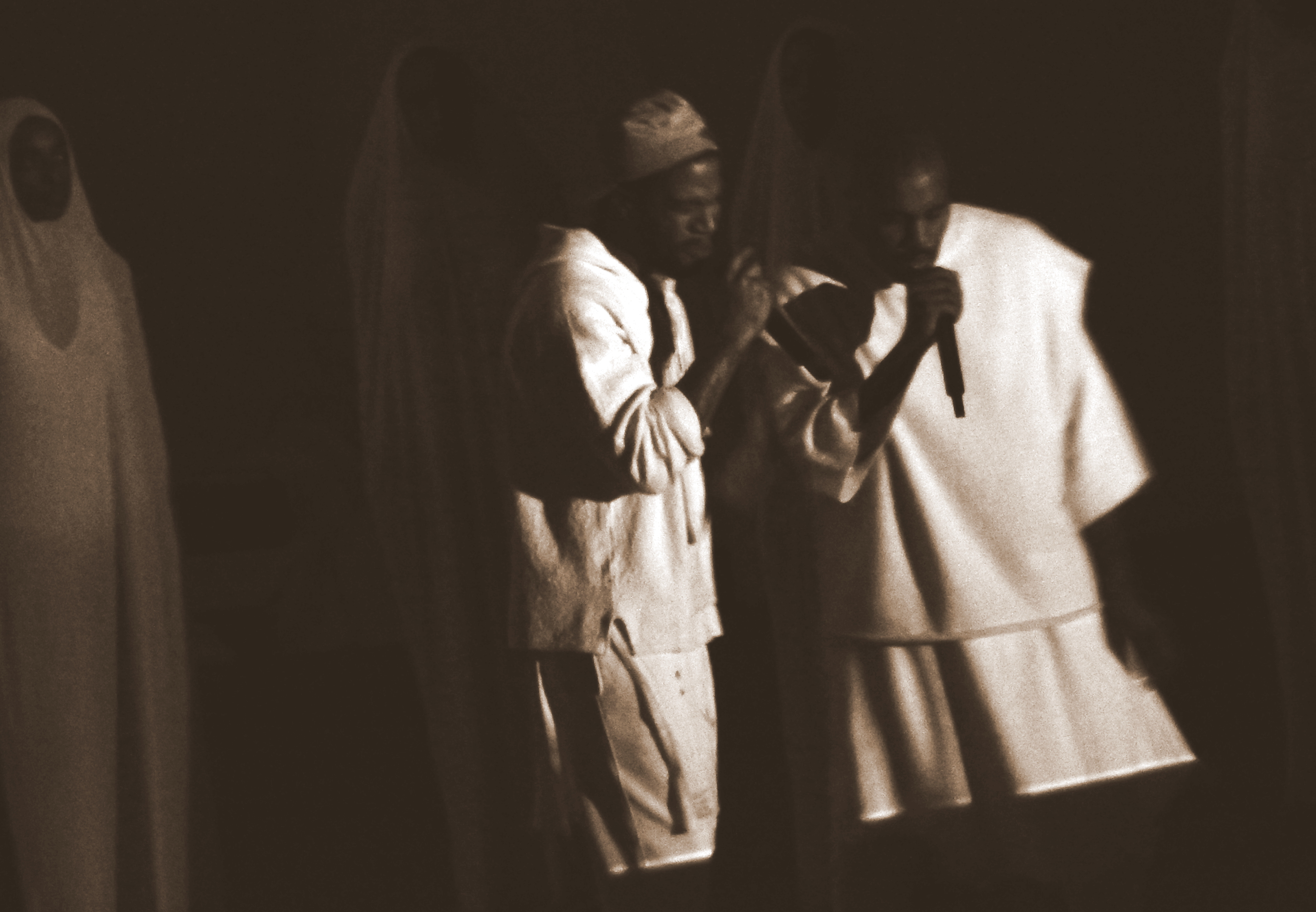
West and Kid Cudi dressed in white for their performance of the song at the Hollywood Bowl in 2015.

While showcasing artists signed onto his GOOD Music imprint for South by Southwest (SXSW) at the Levi's/Fader Fort on March 21, 2009, West brought out Kid Cudi. The rapper's appearance was met with applause before he began to perform, while West introduced him. The two performed "Welcome to Heartbreak", which was followed by Kid Cudi performing his track "Sky Might Fall" (2009). Writing for Baller Status, Miles Bennett picked the former performance as one of the highlights of West's SXSW showcase.

For West's two night concert of 808s & Heartbreak in its entirety at the 2015 Hollywood Bowl in September, he and Kid Cudi performed the song as the set's second track. This marked the first time West had performed the song since March 2009; he wore loose garments in white and off-white shades for the performance. While performing, West was backed by a small band and a medium-sized orchestra. In their first concert under the Kids See Ghosts name, West and Kid Cudi performed "Welcome to Heartbreak" at the 2018 Camp Flog Gnaw Carnival. While it stood as the ninth track of their set, the song was the second track the duo performed that was not a Kids See Ghosts release. The transparent box that the duo performed the song from featured flashing LEDs inside, and their performance was received strongly by the crowd.

== Credits and personnel ==
Information taken from 808s & Heartbreak liner notes.

Recording

- Recorded at Glenwood Studios (Burbank, California) and Avex Recording Studio (Honolulu, Hawaii)

Personnel

- Kanye West – songwriter, producer
- Jeff Bhasker – songwriter, co-producer, keyboards, background vocals
- Plain Pat – songwriter, co-producer
- Scott Mescudi – songwriter
- Andrew Dawson – recorder
- Anthony Kilhoffer – recorder
- Ryan West – recorder
- Chad Carlisle – assistant recorder
- Isha Erskine – assistant recorder
- Gaylord Holomalia – assistant recorder
- Christian Mochizuki – assistant recorder
- Manny Marroquin – mix engineer
- Christian Plata – assistant engineer
- Erik Madrid – assistant engineer
- Larry Gold – string arrangements
- Emma Kummrow – violin
- Igor Szwec – violin
- Luigi Mazzochi – violin
- Gregory Teperman – violin
- Olga Konopelsky – violin
- Charles Parker – violin
- Davis Barnett – viola
- Alexandra Leem – viola
- James J. Cooper, III – cello
- Jennie Lorenzo – cello
- Miles Davis – bass
- Ken Lewis – piano
- Jeff Chestek – string engineer
- Montez Roberts – assistant string engineer
- Rick Friedrich – assistant string engineer
- John Stahl – assistant string engineer

== Charts ==
Chart performance for "Welcome to Heartbreak"
Chart (2008–09)	Peak position
UK Singles (OCC)	112
UK Hip Hop/R&B (Official Charts)	27
US Pop 100 (Billboard)	87

== Certifications ==
Certifications for "Welcome to Heartbreak"
Region	Certification	Certified units/sales
United States (RIAA)	Gold	500,000^{‡}
^{‡} Sales+streaming figures based on certification alone.
