= Kids See Ghosts (album) =

Studio album by Kids See Ghosts
- Released: June 8, 2018
- Recorded: December 2016 – 2018
- Studios: West Lake Ranch, Jackson Hole, Wyoming
- Genres: Hip-hop; psychedelic; progressive rap
- Length: 23:50
- Labels: GOOD; Wicked Awesome; Def Jam
- Producers: André 3000; BoogzDaBeast; Dot da Genius; Kanye West; Kid Cudi; Plain Pat

Kanye West chronology
Ye (2018)	Kids See Ghosts (2018)	Jesus Is King (2019)

Kid Cudi chronology
Passion, Pain & Demon Slayin' (2016)	Kids See Ghosts (2018)	Man on the Moon III: The Chosen (2020)

Kids See Ghosts (stylized in all caps) is the only studio album by the American hip-hop supergroup Kids See Ghosts, composed of the rappers and producers Kanye West and Kid Cudi. It was released on June 8, 2018, through GOOD Music and Wicked Awesome Records, and distributed by Def Jam Recordings. Prior to the release, West and Cudi had collaborated on each other's work since 2008, although they experienced personal quarrels due to creative differences. The first studio sessions for the album began after the two reunited in late 2016.

Guest contributions are included on Kids See Ghosts from Pusha T, Yasiin Bey, and Ty Dolla Sign, as well as a vocal sample of Louis Prima, who is credited posthumously as a featured artist. Kids See Ghosts handled the majority of the stylistically fragmented production that includes varying elements, with further contributions by Dot da Genius, Mike Dean, and Plain Pat, among others. The album was the third of five records produced by West in Jackson Hole as a part of the "Wyoming Sessions", each being released weekly in the summer of 2018. It succeeded the release of Pusha T's Daytona and West's Ye, while preceded the release of Nas' Nasir and Teyana Taylor's K.T.S.E.

Commentators noted the genre of Kids See Ghosts as a fusion of psychedelia and hip-hop. The lyrical content includes references to mental health issues, which both West and Cudi had suffered from previously. The cover art was designed by Japanese contemporary artist Takashi Murakami; he based it on Hokusai's landscape print series, Thirty-six Views of Mount Fuji. The album received widespread acclaim from music critics, who generally pointed out the chemistry of West and Cudi in praise, while some noted an improvement from West's recent work. It was named to year-end lists for 2018 of many publications, including GQ Russia and Pitchfork.

In the United States, Kids See Ghosts debuted at number two on the Billboard 200, alongside entering atop the Top R&B/Hip-Hop Albums chart. It attained top-10 positions in nine other countries, such as Canada and the United Kingdom. The album has since been certified gold and silver in the US and the UK by the Recording Industry Association of America (RIAA) and the British Phonographic Industry (BPI), respectively. Kids See Ghosts performed live for it at the 2018 Camp Flog Gnaw Carnival and the 2019 Coachella Valley Music and Arts Festival.

== Background and recording ==
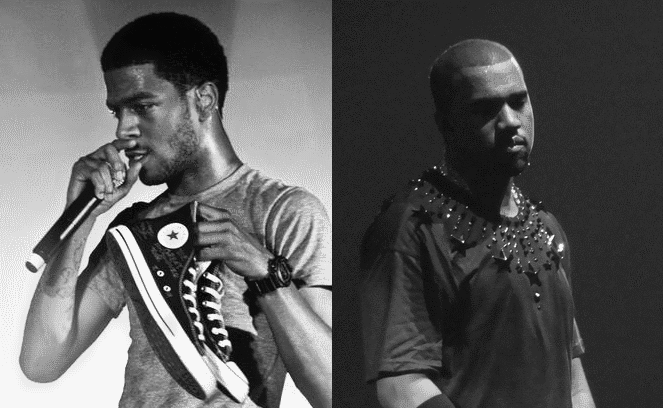
Cudi and West (pictured left and right, respectively) had collaborated on various occasions before releasing a joint album.

Since 2008, Kanye West had frequently collaborated with Kid Cudi. That year, they first worked together on "Welcome to Heartbreak" from West's fourth studio album 808s & Heartbreak. West released his sixth studio album Yeezus on June 18, 2013, which includes vocals from Cudi on "Guilt Trip". In June of the following year, Cudi recalled having recorded the vocals as a reference a couple of years prior and admitted to lacking awareness of being on the song until people mentioned it on social media, initially questioning: "What the fuck is everyone talking about?" Cudi stated he was partially flattered and regarded it "kind of cool that [West] thought of me", before further consideration led the rapper to feel dissatisfied with West underusing him. On February 14, 2016, West released his seventh studio album The Life of Pablo, with the tracks "Father Stretch My Hands, Pt. 1" and "Waves" featuring vocals by Cudi. 10 days after releasing the album, West tweeted on February 24 that he would release an album titled Turbo Grafx 16 in the summer, named after the video game console of the same name. Later that month, his longtime associate Ibn Jasper posted a photo on Instagram showing West, Cudi, and record producers Mike Dean and Plain Pat in a recording studio working on the album.

Cudi briefly fell out with West, criticizing him and Drake over their usage of writers in September 2016, tweeting that he had been loyal to his colleagues but now he was "your threat". West responded to the tweets at the Tampa stop of his Saint Pablo Tour, threatening Cudi not to mention his name again and assuring "I birthed you", before adding that he felt "hurt" and "disrespected". Days later, at a Houston show, West retracted his earlier comments, describing Cudi as his "brother" and "the most influential artist of the past ten years". Cudi, who had admitted himself into a rehabilitation facility following a struggle with depression and suicidal thoughts, thanked West and other supporters in a Facebook post, writing that "words can't really express how much it made my heart glow". West himself was hospitalized due to heavy sleep deprivation in November 2016, with the tour being cancelled after he brought Cudi out to perform at his Sacramento show that ended early. West had suffered from mental illness for 10 years prior to Kids See Ghosts, while Cudi reached post-rehab stage by the time of its release.

In December 2016, Cudi released his sixth studio album Passion, Pain & Demon Slayin', which West subsequently described as "super inspiring". Work on Kids See Ghosts began that same month and parts of it were created in the summer of 2017 during recording sessions in Japan and China. In November, and again in February of the following year, West performed "Father Stretch My Hands, Pt. 1" live with Cudi. West was spotted recording in the US state of Wyoming with various collaborators in March, including Cudi and fellow rapper Nas. He returned to the state two months later for the recording of several then-upcoming albums, which were later referred to as the "Wyoming Sessions". The sessions took place in Jackson Hole, Wyoming, where West had purchased a property known as Monster Lake Ranch and renamed it to West Lake Ranch.

Outside of his own releases, West also executive produced, produced, and provided guest vocals for all of the albums by other artists that originated from the "Wyoming Sessions"; he had announced taking on the role of producer for the sessions beforehand. Fellow rapper Pusha T's third studio album Daytona was issued on May 25, 2018, as the first release of West's "Wyoming Sessions" recordings. On June 1, a week before the release of Kids See Ghosts, West released his eighth studio album Ye as the second album of the "Wyoming Sessions". Cudi made appearances on the tracks "Ghost Town", alongside PartyNextDoor and 070 Shake, and "No Mistakes", alongside Charlie Wilson and Caroline Shaw. West revealed via Twitter that the former was originally slated to appear on Kids See Ghosts. A sequel to "Ghost Town", entitled "Freeee (Ghost Town, Pt. 2)", is included on it, which features vocals from singer Ty Dolla Sign. The release of Kids See Ghosts on June 8, 2018, served as the third album from the "Wyoming Sessions". A week after its release, Nas released his twelfth studio album Nasir as the fourth album of the "Wyoming Sessions". Recording artist Teyana Taylor released her second studio album K.T.S.E. on June 22, 2018, as the fifth and final album of the "Wyoming Sessions".

== Music and production ==
According to Jordan Bassett of NME, Kids See Ghosts shows West and Cudi "catch[ing] up with the fragmented, fragile brand of hip-hop that they helped to shape", noting how "the ethereal, low-key beats" characterize the production. Christopher Thiessen of PopMatters called the tracks "brooding, somber, [and] psychedelic", observing that they often make use of minor chords, while Rrampt. magazine's Andrew Johnston deemed it a "truly adventurous movement in progressive hip-hop", with its seven songs traversing "scatted freakouts, bangers, space odysseys, psychedelic soul, and dream pop". Similarly, Dean Van Nguyen of The Guardian considered the album to be filled with "blistering electronics, laser-cut samples, psychedelic crescendos and edges as blurry as a half-remembered dream", while Van Nguyen categorizing track "Freeee (Ghost Town, Pt. 2)" as rap rock. Sidney Madden of NPR wrote that the track is "reminiscent of fuzzed-out psychedelic rock of the '70s" and also noted the rock elements of "Cudi Montage". The staff of Highsnobiety pointed out West "angrily scatting to the beat" on "Feel the Love". "4th Dimension" and "Cudi Montage" both include samples of posthumously released music: "What Will Santa Claus Say (When He Finds Everybody Swingin')" and "Burn the Rain" by American singers Louis Prima and Kurt Cobain, respectively. Prima received credit as a featured artist on "4th Dimension". "Feel the Love" and "Freeee (Ghost Town, Pt. 2)" include guest vocals from Pusha T and Ty Dolla Sign, respectively. "Kids See Ghosts" features rapper Mos Def, who is credited under his real name of Yasiin Bey.

The album includes prominent production from West and Cudi, though "Reborn" and "Cudi Montage" are the only tracks to not include production from West, while "Feel the Love" and "4th Dimension" are the only tracks without Cudi's production. Dean helped produce "Feel the Love", "4th Dimension", "Freeee (Ghost Town Pt. 2)", and "Cudi Montage". Shawn Setaro of Complex wrote that due to Dean's presence on Ye, "it makes sense he would be equally involved in Kids See Ghosts". Plain Pat contributed production to "Feel the Love", "4th Dimension", "Reborn", and "Kids See Ghosts". Evan Mast helped produce "Feel the Love", "Fire", and "Reborn". "Feel the Love", "4th Dimension", and "Kids See Ghosts" include production from record producer Noah Goldstein. Production was contributed to the tracks "Fire", "4th Dimension", and "Freeee (Ghost Town, Pt. 2)" by record producer BoogzDaBeast. Record producer Dot da Genius, Cudi's WZRD bandmate, co-produced the tracks "Reborn" and "Cudi Montage" for Kids See Ghosts. Musician Justin Vernon was partially responsible for the production of "Feel the Love" and "Kids See Ghosts". The latter and "Freeee (Ghost Town, Pt. 2)" include production from record producer Andrew Dawson. Kids See Ghosts also includes production contributed by Francis and the Lights, Cashmere Cat, André 3000, Andy C, Russel "Love" Crews, and Jeff Bhasker.

== Themes and lyrics ==
"Freeee (Ghost Town, Pt. 2)"
A 19-second sample of the rap rock track "Freeee (Ghost Town, Pt. 2)", which has psychedelic elements. The song showcases recovering from mental illness, with West presenting himself as being numb to criticism. Cudi demonstrates experiencing the recovery and the song represents liberation; West proclaims the freedom of his mind in a moment of heavy triumph.

Lyrically, Kids See Ghosts includes references to mental illness throughout. "Freeee (Ghost Town, Pt. 2)" and "Reborn" are related to the recovery from the state, showcasing a transition to happiness. The album includes the duo battling against their mental fears and anxieties to achieve comfort in a better spirit, with them mostly doing so on the aforementioned tracks. As Robert Christgau summarized for Vice, they demonstrate male bonding and "acknowledge their madness, with West shitcanning his meds" and Cudi becoming enough of "a rehab nut" that it leads to the mantra of "I'm movin' forward" being heavily repeated. Kids See Ghosts also acknowledge their past successes, as well as failures. Pop culture and historical references are frequent throughout Kids See Ghosts, mostly in "4th Dimension".

The album's opener, "Feel the Love", includes a verse from Pusha T, while West contributes gun noises ("vocal rat-a-tats", as Christgau described) to the track and Cudi sings a hook about being able to "feel the love". The staff of Highsnobiety noticed that the position of "Fire" after the track serves as a reminder "of the ping-pong nature of mental illness — sometimes you're up, sometimes you're down", with the song lyrically seeing Kids See Ghosts take "a softer approach to diagnosing the self, exposing the failures of the aforementioned duo". Within "4th Dimension", Kids See Ghosts prevent being burdened by their feelings by putting forward the random in the form of the duo's current thoughts; this is an example of bipolar disorder. West shows that he is numb to criticism on "Freeee (Ghost Town, Pt. 2)", which is about the mind becoming free of any impediments. The song interpolates lyrics from the original "Ghost Town". "Reborn" is linked to getting past mental lows that inspire depression and usage of drugs. The throes of paranoia are addressed on "Kids See Ghosts", which also features political ideas from Yasiin Bey: "Civilization without society / Power and wealth with nobility / Stability without stasis / Spaces and places." In contrast to the song's lyrical content, "Cudi Montage" features Cudi remarking about the journey to his mind's reconstruction and West referencing an environment's cycle of violence. The track was described by the staff of Highsnobiety as closing out Kids See Ghosts "on a whimper, purposefully, to dictate the cyclical nature of mental illness".

Some commentators have compared the album's exploration of alienation, spirituality, suffering and redemption to themes present in the work of Italian filmmaker and writer Pier Paolo Pasolini. Prior to the release of Kids See Ghosts, Kanye West stated that he had read and studied Pasolini's collected works. West later reaffirmed his admiration for Pasolini, stating that he had studied the artist's opera omnia and held him in high regard despite their differing views.

== Artwork and title ==
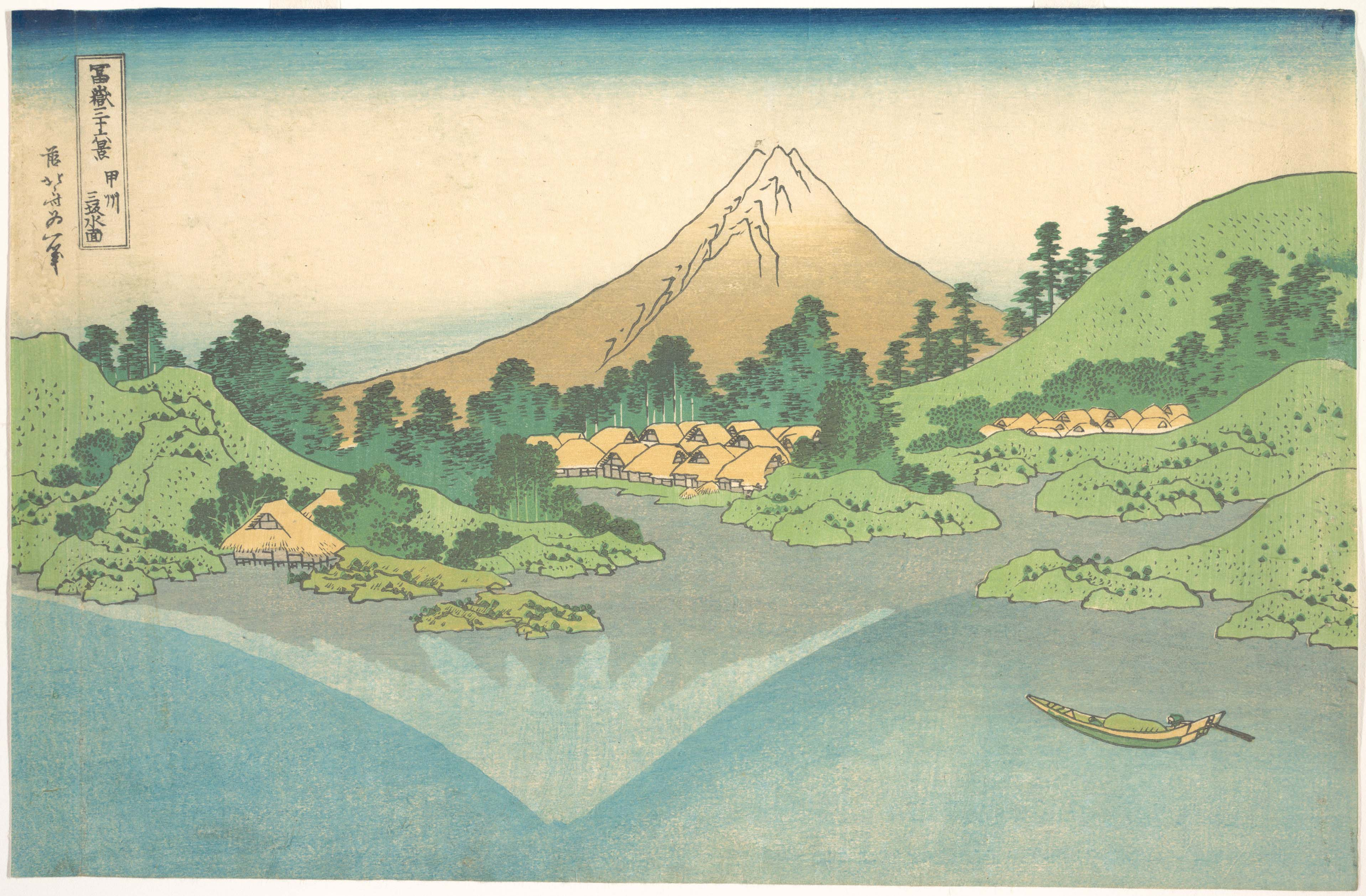
An image from Hokusai's series Thirty-six Views of Mount Fuji, which was the basis for the album artwork's background that features a mountain.

In August 2017, West and Cudi visited Japanese artist Takashi Murakami at his studio, with Murakami sharing images of the three via Instagram. West had previously collaborated with Murakami for the artwork of his third studio album Graduation (2007) and the animated music video for its opening track, "Good Morning". On April 22, 2018, West shared art by Murakami related to the album via Twitter, confirming the title to be Kids See Ghosts. The black and white image featured two caricatures that appeared to be of West and Cudi stood by a smoke ball with a face, while the title was included in a spray paint font. The only parts of the art not in black and white were Japanese writing, an autograph, and a sunflower. Accompanying his tweet, West added the caption "Murakami vibes". Regarding the drawing, Murakami told Complex that he and his assistants followed their "very rudimental plan" of drawing different ideas on a paper with West and his assistants. Murakami also said that West had brought forward the idea of portraying an anthropomorphized bear and fox, to reflect him and Cudi, respectively. Cudi allegedly had suggested for his character to be represented by a dog, however upon seeing an early sketch, West insisted that Cudi was better represented by a fox.

Cudi tweeted out Murakami's artwork for the album on June 6, 2018, which has a high similarity to the art previously shared by West. Murakami explained that Hokusai's Thirty-six Views of Mount Fuji was the basis of the artwork's background picture. The pastel-colored cover art presents a psychedelic scene, showing a ghostly figure riding on top of a sperm-shaped monster that has sharp teeth and haunted eyes. The figure is flying through a forest, which is backed by a mountain. The title Kids See Ghosts continues "the spooky-ghost routine" that started with West releasing "Ghost Town", which is also continued by the album with "Freeee (Ghost Town, Pt. 2)".

== Release and promotion ==
In late 2017, it was rumored that West and Cudi were working on a collaborative album, reportedly titled Everybody Wins. On April 19, 2018, West announced via Twitter that an album with Cudi was set to be released on June 8. He followed the announcement that same day by tweeting the album's title, which also serves as the name of their duo, Kids See Ghosts. On April 25, 2018, West revealed via Twitter that the album was scheduled to be accompanied by a short film, slated to be directed by Dexter Navy, who had collaborated with him in the past on the music video for "Flashing Lights" (2007). West tweeted out the track list on June 2, which included a track called "Devil's Watchin" that was ultimately not released on Kids See Ghosts. The spot of fourth track was blank at the time after "Ghost Town" had been removed, having a possibility of being taken up the track "Extasy" after it did not appear on Ye. The latter was later released as "XTCY" on August 11, 2018. "Freeee (Ghost Town, Pt. 2)" ultimately took up the spot of the fourth track on Kids See Ghosts.

On June 8, 2018, the album was released for digital download and streaming by GOOD Music and Wicked Awesome Records, distributed by Def Jam Recordings, as Kids See Ghosts' eponymous debut studio album. The digital release of Kids See Ghosts faced technical difficulties, with six of the songs initially being incorrectly titled and ordered on streaming services; "Freeee (Ghost Town, Pt. 2)" was the only one to not be mislabeled. The same year as being digitally issued, the album was released on CD through the labels in various countries. During an interview with Complex on September 9, 2019, it was revealed by Cudi that more albums by Kids See Ghosts are set to be released in the future, and he assured that West had told him he wanted to start working on Kids See Ghosts 2.

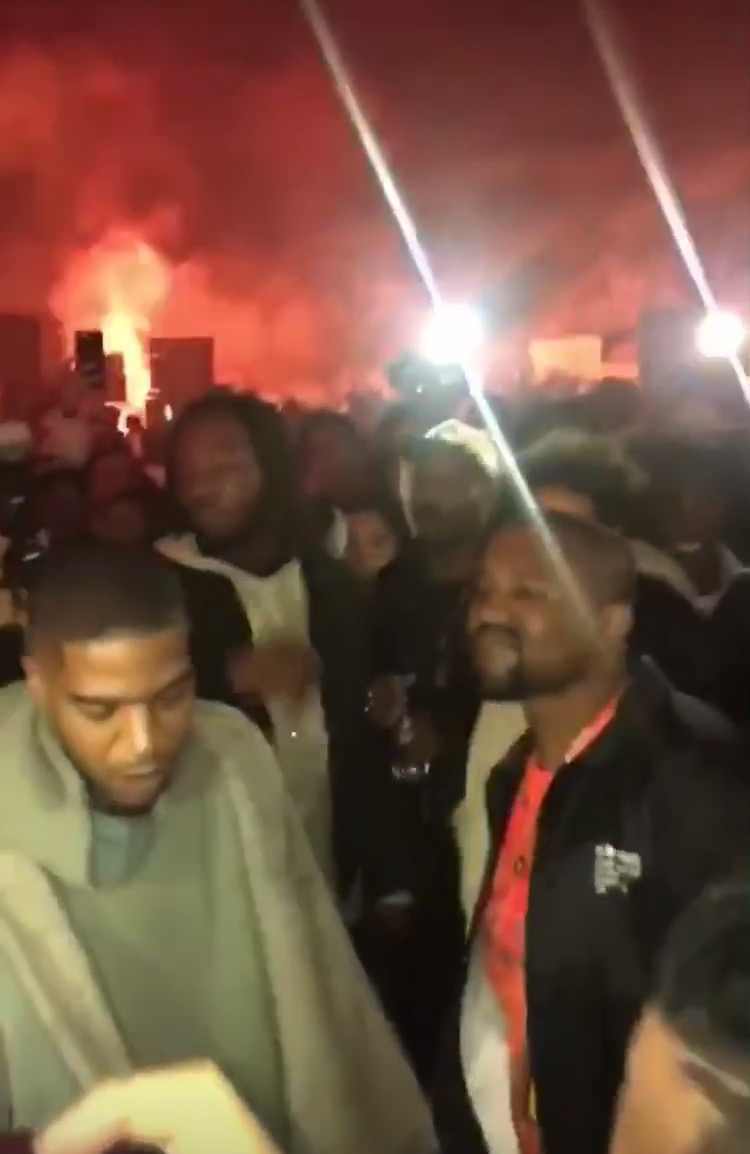
Kids See Ghosts during the album's listening party in Southern California, backed by a bonfire.

On June 5, 2018, Cudi's manager Dennis Cummings announced a listening party for Kids See Ghosts in Los Angeles via Twitter, which was to be conducted a day prior to its release. Cudi announced on Twitter that the live stream of the listening party was intended to take place through WAV at 8 pm EST, simultaneously sharing a link to download the application. Following a series of unexplained delays alongside much frustration being caused, the listening party did not start until 1:50 am EST on June 8, 2018. It was unknown whether the live stream being delayed was because of a technical issue or Kids See Ghosts showing up late. The listening party was held by a bonfire at a secret location in Southern California, with Kids See Ghosts showcasing their merchandise at it. Attendees of the listening party included the Kardashian-Jenner clan, Quentin Miller of American hip-hop duo WDNG Crshrs, rapper and singer Desiigner, and Trinidadian-American rapper Trinidad James. Shortly after the party, videos circulated on social media of Dean completing the mixing of Kids See Ghosts.

No music videos were released for the album or Ye. Kids See Ghosts made their live debut at the 2018 Camp Flog Gnaw Carnival, performing for 45 minutes inside a rectangular glass box that was floating above the stage. The duo went through a full performance of Kids See Ghosts, delivering the tracks in the order of the track list, and also performed a number of past collaborations, including "Welcome to Heartbreak" and "Father Stretch My Hands, Pt. 1". West forgot several lyrics from his verses on "Reborn" and "Cudi Montage". During the first concert of West's gospel group the Sunday Service Choir on January 6, 2019, the group and him performed "Reborn" while Cudi was in attendance. Kids See Ghosts performed numerous tracks live at that year's Coachella Festival, including "Reborn" and "Freeee (Ghost Town, Pt. 2)". In June 2020, Cudi shared a teaser for the album's animated show of the same name. The clip used "4th Dimension" as its soundtrack, while the show is directed by Murakami.

== Critical reception ==
Kids See Ghosts ratings
Aggregate scores
Source	Rating
AnyDecentMusic?	8.1/10
Metacritic	84/100
Review scores
Source	Rating
AllMusic	4.5/5 stars
The A.V. Club	B
Entertainment Weekly	A−
Exclaim!	9/10
The Guardian	4/5 stars
NME	4/5 stars
Pitchfork	7.6/10
Rolling Stone	3/5 stars
Vice (Expert Witness)	A−
XXL	4/5

According to the review aggregator Metacritic, Kids See Ghosts received "universal acclaim" based on a weighted average score of 84 out of 100 from 18 critic scores. Aggregator AnyDecentMusic? gave it 8.1 out of 10, based on their assessment of the critical consensus.

In a positive review, Van Nguyen referred to the album as "a psychedelic return to godlike power", commending Cudi's performance and the chemistry of Kids See Ghosts, as well as the lyricism: "The brevity is effective as [they] stack ideas on top of ideas, packing the 23 minutes with as much creativity as possible. The chemistry is that of two old friends who no longer have to second-guess each other's instincts", concluding that the album reasserts West "as a fun, thrilling rap music-maker that tests the genre's boundaries". Jayson Greene of Pitchfork wrote that "the songs are the most intriguing ones to emerge from this Wyoming project thus far". He compared Kids See Ghosts positively to Ye, writing that "a lot of the energy that Ye seemed to be gasping for fills the lungs of this project, and it's humbling to consider how much this material might have enlivened West's own album". He further praised the "soul and depth" of Cudi's contributions to the album, and the duo's "psychic bond", which "yields a spacious and melancholy album about brokenness". He concluded that Kids See Ghosts marked "the first time in years" that "Kanye sounds at peace".

Providing a highly positive review, Russell Stone of Highsnobiety praised Cudi's performance for "fueling the album's immaculate feel" and "sounding [his] most empowered" yet, while complimenting West's "mind-bending" production and focused subject matter, in contrast to his lyricism on Ye. Bassett asserted that Kids See Ghosts "sounds, suitably, ghostly and supernatural", offering a moderate "glimpse" into a different world, and is "the sound of two artists looking back over the vast distance they've travelled so far". Writing for The A.V. Club, Marty Sartini Garner commended Cudi's contributions as "without qualification, the spiritual and artistic backbone of Kids See Ghosts, the source of its truest artistic risks", writing that he "lifts Kanye up", who "allows Cudi to take him further" than he has gone on his own. He also stated the album "marks [Cudi]'s true return only a year and a half after he checked himself into rehab to fight depression and suicidal ideation", affirming that the rehab "seems to have done him wonders". Chuck Arnold of Entertainment Weekly wrote that the album "had a lot going against it before it dropped from the Wyoming wilderness", but that the album's "hope, healing, and haunting music in the face of darkness" causes these concerns to "go out the window", and that West and Cudi "craft a work that easily surpasses Ye both musically and emotionally". He concluded that the album "leaves you greedy for more", hoping West and Cudi "have rid themselves of enough ghosts to bust out more of this kind of artistry". In a less enthusiastic review for Rolling Stone, Christopher R. Weingarten wrote that the album is "nowhere near as incisive, infectious or rewarding as their best work", but is "still an important step forward into an era of big moods and short attention spans".

=== Accolades ===
Kids See Ghosts ranked at number one on GQ Russia's list of 2018's best albums. It was listed at number two on Pitchfork Readers' Poll: Top 50 Albums of 2018; on others polls conducted by Pitchfork for that year, the album ranked as the third most underrated and seventh most overrated album respectively, while "Kids See Ghosts" ranked at number 14 on the top 50 songs list. Similarly, Slant Magazine listed Kids See Ghosts as the third best album of the year, with the staff saying that Kids See Ghosts "alternate between haunted-house trappings and candidly confronting their respective demons". The album was voted 55th on Uproxx's music critics poll for 2018 albums, scoring 35 points. It came in at number 72 on The Village Voice's Pazz & Jop poll that year, gathering 90 points and being tied with two other albums for the position. On The Music's list of the best cult albums of the 2010s decade, Kids See Ghosts was ranked at number nine. For the magazine, Cyclone described the album as where the duo "ventured into hip hop psychedelia, bonding over their mental health journeys", while noting "Reborn" as being the highlight.

Select rankings of Kids See Ghosts
Publication	List	Rank	Ref.
GQ Russia	The Best Music Albums of 2018	1	
The New York Times	The 28 Best Albums of 2018 (Jon Caramanica's List)	7	
NME	NME's Albums of the Year 2018	15	
Pitchfork	Pitchfork Readers' Poll: Top 50 Albums of 2018	2	
Q	The Top 50 Albums of 2018	40	
Robert Christgau	Dean's List 2018	82	
Rolling Stone	30 Best Hip-Hop Albums of 2018	16	
Slant Magazine	The 25 Best Albums of 2018	3	
Uproxx	Uproxx Music Critics Poll 2018: Albums	55	
The Village Voice	The Pazz & Jop Music Critics Poll 2018	72	

== Commercial performance ==
Unlike Ye, Kids See Ghosts failed to give West a chart topper on the US Billboard 200, debuting at number two on the chart behind Dave Matthews Band's ninth studio album Come Tomorrow (2018). The album totalled 142,000 album-equivalent units, which included 79,000 pure album sales and over 90 million streams. On the US Top R&B/Hip-Hop Albums chart, Kids See Ghosts entered at number one. On January 29, 2021, the album was certified gold by the Recording Industry Association of America (RIAA) for registering 500,000 certified units in the United States. Kids See Ghosts peaked at number two on the Irish Albums Chart, tying with Graduation and Late Registration (2005) for West's second highest-charting albums on the chart. On the Canadian Albums Chart, Kids See Ghosts entered at number three, standing as the second highest debut of the week, one place behind Come Tomorrow at number two. This gave Cudi his highest-charting album in Canada since his third studio album Indicud attained the same position in 2013. Kids See Ghosts also peaked at number three on Estonia's Albumid tipp-40, the Latvian Albums Chart, New Zealand Albums Chart, and Norwegian Albums Chart.

The album debuted at number four on the ARIA Albums chart, becoming West's second top-10 album in 2018 and Cudi's first appearance on the chart since Indicud. This also led to Kids See Ghosts becoming the fourth major hip-hop act to have an album reach the top-10 of the ARIA Albums chart in 2018, joining West with Ye, J. Cole with his fifth studio album KOD, and ASAP Rocky with his third studio album Testing. A top-five position was also attained by Kids See Ghosts in the Netherlands, with it peaking at number five on Dutch Album Top 100. The album ranked at number 13 on the midweek album sales chart in the United Kingdom for the week of its release, before debuting six places higher at number seven on the UK Albums Chart. The debut made Kids See Ghosts the week's third highest entry, though was a position five places lower than Ye gave West when peaking at number two on the chart earlier in 2018. On April 2, 2021, the former was certified silver by the British Phonographic Industry (BPI) for sales of 60,000 units in the UK.

All of the seven tracks from Kids See Ghosts debuted on the Billboard Hot 100, with "Reborn" entering the highest at number 39; West had previously achieved this feat with Ye. The song was later certified platinum by the RIAA for amassing 1,000,000 certified units in the US on June 11, 2020. All the tracks also entered the ARIA Singles Chart, Canadian Hot 100, and Irish Singles Chart, with "Reborn" charting the highest in Ireland too. The song charted on the UK Singles Chart along with "Feel the Love" and "4th Dimension", all three of which reached the top-50.

== Track listing ==
Kids See Ghosts track listing
No.	Title	Writer(s)	Producer(s)	Length
1.	"Feel the Love" (featuring Pusha T)	Kanye West; Scott Mescudi; Mike Dean; Evan Mast; Benjamin Levin; Terrence Thornton; Jeremy Nutzman; Anthony Rabiola	West; Benny Blanco^{[c]}; Dean^{[c]}; Plain Pat^{[a]}; Mast^{[a]}; Justin Vernon^{[a]}; Francis and the Lights^{[a]}; Cashmere Cat^{[a]}; Noah Goldstein^{[a]}	2:45
2.	"Fire"	West; Mescudi; Mast; André Benjamin	West; Kid Cudi; BoogzDaBeast; André 3000; Mast^{[a]}	2:20
3.	"4th Dimension" (featuring Louis Prima)	West; Mescudi; Dean; Louis Prima	West; Dean^{[a]}; Goldstein^{[a]}	2:33
4.	"Freeee (Ghost Town, Pt. 2)" (featuring Ty Dolla Sign)	West; Mescudi; Tyrone Griffin Jr.; Dean; Jeff Bhasker; Corin Littler	West; Kid Cudi; Dean^{[c]}; Bhasker^{[c]}; BoogzDaBeast^{[c]}; Andrew Dawson^{[a]}; Andy C^{[a]}; Russell "Love" Crews^{[a]}	3:26
5.	"Reborn"	West; Mescudi; Mast; Oladipo Omishore	Kid Cudi; Dot da Genius; Plain Pat^{[c]}; Mast^{[c]}; Blanco^{[a]}	5:24
6.	"Kids See Ghosts" (featuring Yasiin Bey)	West; Mescudi; Yasiin Bey; Dawson^{[d]}; Vernon	West; Kid Cudi; Plain Pat; Dawson^{[a]}; Vernon^{[a]}; Goldstein^{[a]}	4:05
7.	"Cudi Montage"	West; Mescudi; Dean; Kurt Cobain	Kid Cudi; Dot da Genius; Dean^{[c]}	3:17
Total length:				23:50

Notes

- ^{^[c]} signifies a co-producer
- ^{^[a]} signifies an additional producer
- ^{^[d]} Andrew Dawson is credited as an "adapter" in the track's official liner notes.

Sample credits

- "Fire" contains a sample of "They're Coming to Take Me Away, Ha-Haaa!", written and performed by Jerry "Napoleon XIV" Samuels.
- "4th Dimension" contains samples of "What Will Santa Claus Say (When He Finds Everybody Swingin')", written and performed by Louis Prima, and an uncredited sample of "Someday", written and performed by Shirley Ann Lee.
- "Freeee (Ghost Town, Pt. 2)" contains samples of "Stark", written and performed by Corin "Mr. Chop" Littler, an uncredited sample of a speech from Marcus Garvey, and portions of the previous "Ghost Town".
- "Cudi Montage" contains samples of "Burn the Rain", written and performed by Kurt Cobain.

== Personnel ==
Credits adapted from liner notes and Tidal.

Production

- Nico Aglietti – engineering (track 4)
- Thomas Cullison – engineering (track 5)
- Andrew Dawson – engineering (tracks 1, 4–6), mixing (tracks 1, 5)
- Mike Dean – co-executive producer, mixing, mastering
- Zack Djurich – engineering, acoustic guitar (track 4)
- Noah Goldstein – co-executive producer, engineering (tracks 1–3, 5–7)
- Jess Jackson – mixing
- Tom Kahre – engineering (track 1)
- Kid Cudi – executive producer
- Mike Malchicoff – engineering
- William J. Sullivan – engineering
- Sean Solymar – mix assistance
- Kanye West – executive producer

Design

- Katsushika Hokusai – background art (View of Mt. Fuji (1847))
- Horst Janssen – seal references
- Jnthed – character design
- Aki Kondo – character design
- Takashi Murakami – creative direction, artwork, calligraphy
- Chieri Nakano – original drawing direction
- Soga Shōhaku – seal references

== Charts ==
=== Weekly charts ===
2018 chart performance for Kids See Ghosts
Chart (2018)	Peak position
Australian Albums (ARIA)	4
Australian Urban Albums (ARIA)	2
Austrian Albums (Ö3 Austria)	15
Belgian Albums (Ultratop Flanders)	14
Belgian Albums (Ultratop Wallonia)	41
Canadian Albums (Billboard)	3
Czech Albums (ČNS IFPI)	11
Dutch Albums (Album Top 100)	5
Estonia (Eesti Tipp-40)	3
Finnish Albums (Suomen virallinen lista)	15
German Albums (Offizielle Top 100)	33
Irish Albums (Official Charts)	2
Italian Albums (FIMI)	42
Latvian Albums (LAIPA)	3
Lithuanian Albums (AGATA)	76
New Zealand Albums (RMNZ)	3
Norwegian Albums (VG-lista)	3
Scottish Albums (Official Charts)	49
Slovak Albums (ČNS IFPI)	9
Swedish Albums (Sverigetopplistan)	13
Swiss Albums (Schweizer Hitparade)	12
UK Albums (Official Charts)	7
UK R&B Albums (Official Charts)	2
US Billboard 200	2
US Top R&B/Hip-Hop Albums (Billboard)	1

2021 chart performance for Kids See Ghosts
Chart (2021)	Peak position
Croatian Albums (HDU)	10

=== Year-end charts ===
2018 year-end chart performance for Kids See Ghosts
Chart (2018)	Position
Australian Urban Albums (ARIA)	41
Estonian Albums (Eesti Tipp-40)	100
Icelandic Albums (Plötutíóindi)	67
US Billboard 200	140
US Top R&B/Hip-Hop Albums (Billboard)	58

2019 year-end chart performance for Kids See Ghosts
Chart (2019)	Position
Australian Urban Albums (ARIA)	65

== Certifications ==
Certifications and sales for Kids See Ghosts
Region	Certification	Certified units/sales
Denmark (IFPI Danmark)	Gold	10,000^{‡}
United Kingdom (BPI)	Silver	60,000^{‡}
United States (RIAA)	Gold	500,000^{‡}
^{‡} Sales+streaming figures based on certification alone.

== Release history ==
Release dates and formats for Kids See Ghosts
Region	Date	Label(s)	Format(s)	Ref(s).
Various	June 8, 2018	GOOD; Def Jam; Wicked Awesome	Digital download; streaming	
Various	2018	Various	CD	
Various	June 5, 2020	Virgin	Black vinyl	
Various	November 27, 2020	GOOD; Def Jam; Wicked Awesome	Pink vinyl	

== See also ==
- 2018 in hip-hop
- GOOD Fridays
- List of top 10 albums in 2018 (Australia)
- List of UK top-ten albums in 2018
- List of Billboard number-one R&B/hip-hop albums of 2018
