= Jesus Is Born =

Studio album by Sunday Service Choir
- Released: December 25, 2019
- Recorded: 2019
- Genre: Gospel
- Length: 83:57
- Labels: INC (Self-published); Vydia
- Producers: Kanye West (also exec.); Jason White; Nikki Grier; Philip Cornish; Federico Vindver; Budgie

Sunday Service Choir chronology
| Jesus Is Born (2019) | Emmanuel (2020) |

Jesus Is Born is the debut studio album by American gospel group Sunday Service Choir, with American rapper Kanye West acting as executive producer. It was released on December 25, 2019, through INC. The album was released to coincide with Christmas and follows the release of West's Christian-themed ninth studio album Jesus Is King, which was released two months prior on October 25, 2019.

West announced the release date of Jesus Is Born the day before Jesus Is King was released, with the group's choir director Jason White later confirming the release. The former received generally positive reviews from music critics, who often commented on West's involvement. The album charted at number 73 and two on the US Billboard 200 and US Top Gospel Albums charts, respectively.

== Background and recording ==
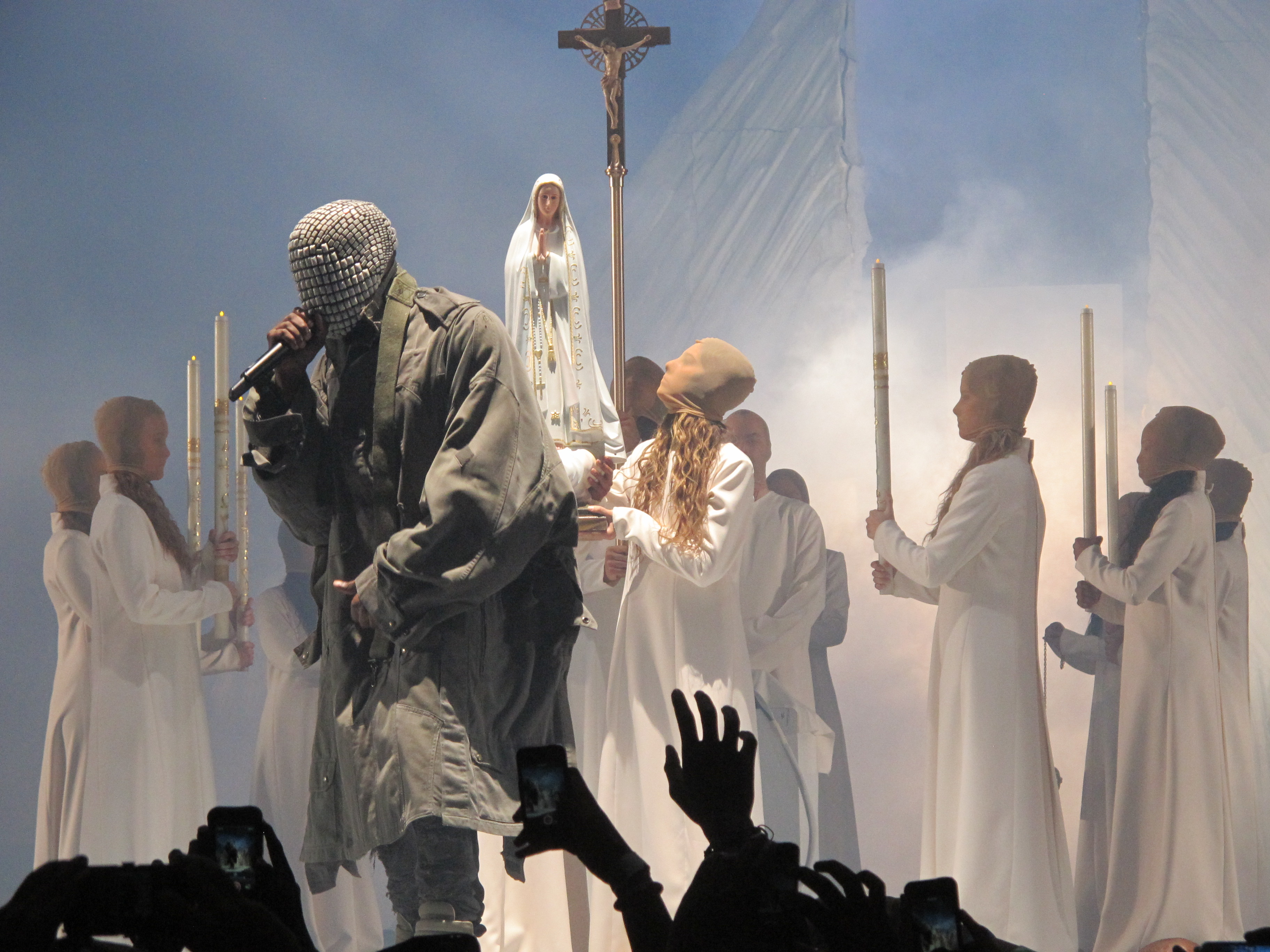
Kanye West, pictured in 2013 during the Yeezus Tour, formed the Sunday Service Choir in January 2019.

On the first Sunday of 2019, West began the first "Sunday Service" rehearsal, where he performed gospel arrangements of songs from his discography and other songs with choir group The Samples and frequent collaborators such as Tony Williams and Ant Clemons. In April 2019, West has claimed that he was "radically saved" around the time of the group's first public performance at the Coachella Valley Music and Arts Festival. West's ninth studio album Jesus Is King was released in October 2019, with Sunday Service providing featured vocals on the track "Every Hour" and additional vocals on "Selah", "Everything We Need" and "Water".

== Release and promotion ==
In a pre-recorded promotional interview with Zane Lowe released a day before West's album Jesus Is King, the rapper announced that a Sunday Service album entitled Jesus Is Born would be released on December 25, 2019, to coincide with Christmas. It was later confirmed that the album would be released on that date at a special Christmas Eve edition of Sunday Service by the group's leader Jason White, with him doing so while addressing the audience. A video was shared by Complex that shows Sunday Service in the studio with a note marking the Christmas release. On December 25, 2019, Jesus Is Born was released for digital download and streaming by INC. The album's release differentiated from the release of Jesus Is King due to it undergoing no delays. The music tech company Vydia distributed the album to streaming services. West tweeted a link to where Jesus Is Born became available for streaming on December 25, 2019, accompanied by the album's cover art. Though the album is credited to the Sunday Service Choir, Forbes, CNN and Entertainment Weekly consider Jesus Is Born to be part of West's album discography.

== Critical reception ==
Professional ratings
Aggregate scores
| Source | Rating |
|---|---|
| AnyDecentMusic? | 6.5/10 |
| Metacritic | 74/100 |
Review scores
| Source | Rating |
| AllMusic | 3.5/5 stars |
| Clash | 7/10 |
| Exclaim! | 7/10 |
| The Guardian | 3/5 stars |
| NME | 4/5 stars |
| Pitchfork | 7.4/10 |
| PopMatters | 7/10 |
| Spectrum Culture | 2.75/5 stars |

According to the review aggregator Metacritic, Jesus Is Born received "generally favorable reviews" based on a weighted average score of 74 out of 100 from 6 critic scores. Aggregator AnyDecentMusic? gave Jesus Is Born 6.5 out of 10, based on their assessment of the critical consensus.

NME's Rhian Daly described the album as "a record that is gospel through-and-through, with no quantifying statements necessary" and opined that it is not essential to "believe in a higher being or have any interest in gospel music" to appreciate the album. In Billboard, Bianca Gracie praised the album for focusing more on the choir than Jesus Is King, while claiming that Jesus Is Born "builds upon West's immersive reawakening." Gracie also noted that the album "wouldn't be a Kanye West-led album without a few nods to his own discography" and wrote that it "balances heritage with millennial innovation." Shane Cashman from Pitchfork looked at the album as where West "assembled a massive choir to channel his Christian message in a joyous, all-consuming wave of sound" and viewed him as "using the choir as a living, breathing sampler," due to West selecting old songs to be recontextualized by the choir, despite the lack of any samples. Neil Z. Yeung of AllMusic viewed the album as being "imbued by the influences of traditional gospel predecessors" and claimed that West's "production touches can be subtly heard throughout," despite the lack of vocals from him.

Dean Van Nguyen was less enthusiastic in The Guardian, claiming that Jesus Is Born is not likable for those uninterested in the "religious rebirth" of West, though stated that "the album certainly fulfils its prayerful remit" and "is more full-bodied than its predecessor." In a mixed review, Daniel Bromfield of Spectrum Culture wrote that despite the absence of vocals from West on the album being refreshing, "the lack of his fingerprints is disappointing." Bromfield elaborated, noting that West "hasn't written any new songs" for the album and branded the content as "slim pickings."

== Commercial performance ==
After a-day-and-a-half of tracking, Jesus Is Born debuted on the US Billboard Top Gospel Albums chart at number two. The album sold 6,000 album-equivalent units, 3,000 of which came from pure album sales, though it was held off the top spot by Jesus Is King with 10,000 units. The following week, the latter debuted at number 73 on the US Billboard 200, standing as the second highest entry of the week on the chart. That same week, Jesus Is Born sold 10,000 album-equivalent units and remained at number two on the US Top Gospel Albums chart; this was following its first full week of tracking. The album entered at number three on the UK Christian & Gospel Albums chart, one place behind Jesus Is King at number two.

Nine of Jesus Is Born's 19 tracks charted on the US Billboard Gospel Songs chart. This led to West's music taking up 20 of the 25 positions on the chart at once, including tracks released under his real name and by the Sunday Service Choir, respectively; the former of which are not included on the album. "Father Stretch" stood as the highest charting track from Jesus Is Born, reaching number ten on the US Gospel Songs chart, though music released under West's real name prevented the song from charting higher.

== Track listing ==
| No. | Title | Writer(s) | Length |
|---|---|---|---|
| 1. | "Count Your Blessings" | Timothy Wright | 5:27 |
| 2. | "Excellent" | Brenda Joyce Moore | 3:29 |
| 3. | "Revelations 19:1" | A. Jeffrey LaValley | 5:33 |
| 4. | "Rain" | Nikki Grier; Brian Alexander Morgan; Jaco Pastorius | 4:48 |
| 5. | "Balm in Gilead" | Twinkie Clark | 2:08 |
| 6. | "Father Stretch" | Kanye West; T. L. Barrett | 5:52 |
| 7. | "Follow Me – Faith" | William Brian Jennings; Eddie L. Lewis; DJ Kyle “Small” Smith; Grier; West; Larry Heard; Norman Whitfield; Edward Holland, Jr.; Cornelius Grant | 7:02 |
| 8. | "Ultralight Beam" | Grier; West | 3:21 |
| 9. | "Lift Up Your Voices" | Grier; Andrew Swanson; Sia Furler; Thomas Pentz | 7:48 |
| 10. | "More Than Anything" | Rick Robinson | 6:54 |
| 11. | "Weak" | Grier; Morgan | 3:05 |
| 12. | "That's How the Good Lord Works" | Grier; Phyliss McKoy Joubert | 4:43 |
| 13. | "Sunshine" | The Clark Sisters | 4:14 |
| 14. | "Back to Life" | Grier; Caron Wheeler; Paul Hooper; Simon Law | 3:19 |
| 15. | "Souls Anchored" | Grier; Benjamin Bush; Stephen Garrett; Timothy Mosley | 3:59 |
| 16. | "Sweet Grace" | Grier | 1:38 |
| 17. | "Paradise" | Grier; Jeremy Felton; Keith James; Mick Schultz | 4:13 |
| 18. | "Satan, We're Gonna Tear Your Kingdom Down" | Shirley Caesar | 3:23 |
| 19. | "Total Praise" | Richard Smallwood | 3:15 |
| Total length: | | | 83:57 |

== Credits and personnel ==
Credits are adapted from Tidal and Instagram and may be incomplete because official liner notes for the album have not been released yet.

- Kanye West – executive production, production
- Nikki Grier – production, arrangement (tracks 4, 7, 9, 11, 14–17)
- Jason White – production, choir director, arrangement (tracks 1–13, 15–19)
- Philip Cornish – production, music director, organ, keys, arrangement (tracks 2–15, 17)
- Federico Vindver – production (tracks 5, 16)
- Budgie – production (tracks 5, 16)
- Steve Epting – arrangement (tracks 4, 7, 9, 11, 14, 15, 17)
- Jawan McEastland – arrangement (track 16)
- Track 10 – contains samples of "More than Anything" by Lamar Campbell
- Track 11 – contains samples of "Power Belongs To God" by Hezekiah Walker
- Jonathan E. Coleman – production coordinator, choir manager

The Samples "Sunday Service Choir"

- Adam Michael Wilson – choir
- Adriana N. Washington – choir
- Akua Willis – choir
- Alexander Jacke – choir
- Alexandria A. Arowora – choir
- Alexandria Simone Griffin – choir
- Alexis James – choir
- Alexis Jones – choir
- Alisha Roney – choir
- Amanda Adams – choir
- Amber M. Grant – choir
- Ameera Perkins – choir
- Andre M. Washington – choir
- Angela C. Williams – choir
- Angelle King – choir
- Anthony McEastland – choir
- Ashley Echols – choir
- Ashley Nichol – choir
- Ashley Washington – choir
- Ashly Williams – choir
- Bobby Musique Cooks – choir
- Bradley Morice Jones – choir
- Brandi JaNise Majors – choir
- Brandon Rodgers – choir
- Breenen Johnson – choir
- Brittany Jerita Wallace – choir
- Brooke Brewer – choir
- Bryan Austin Green – choir
- Caleb Minter – choir
- Carisa Dalton Moore – choir
- Carmel A. Echols – choir
- Cassandra Renee Grigsby Chism – choir
- Cedric Jackson II – choir
- Cedrit B. Leonard Jr. – choir
- Chadric R Johnson – choir
- Chara Hammonds – choir
- Chaz Mason – choir
- Chelsea B Miller – choir
- Chelsea West – choir
- Chimera Wilson – choir
- Claudia A. Cunningham – choir
- Corinthian Buffington – choir
- Crystal Butler McQueen – choir
- Curnita Turner – choir
- Daniel Devila – choir
- Daniel Ozan – choir
- Danielle E Deimler – choir
- Darius Coleman – choir
- Deanna Dixon – choir
- Deonis Cook – choir
- Derrick Evans – choir
- Desiree Washington – choir
- Destine Nelson – choir
- Devon Baker – choir
- Don Sykes – choir
- Donald Paige – choir
- Dwanna Orange – choir
- Emi Seacrest – choir
- Eric L. Copeland II – choir
- Erik Brooks – choir
- Estherlancia Mercado – choir
- Fallynn Rian Oliver – choir
- Fannie Belle Johnson – choir
- Felice LaZae Martin – choir
- Gabrielle Carreiro – choir
- George Hamilton – choir
- Herman Bryant III – choir
- India Moret – choir
- Isaiah Johnson – choir
- Isaiah Steven Jones – choir
- Jacquelyn M. Jones – choir
- Jaden Blakley Gray – choir
- Jamal Moore – choir
- Jasmine L Morrow – choir
- JaVonte Pollard – choir
- Jazmine Yvette Bailey – choir
- Jenelle Rose Dunkley – choir
- Jerel Duren – choir
- Jerome Wayne – choir
- JeRonelle McGhee – choir
- Jherimi Leigh Henry – choir
- Joel Echols – choir
- Johnny Lee Paddio Jr – choir
- Joy A. Love – choir
- Justin Hart – choir
- Kadeem S. Nichols – choir
- Kamili Mitchell – choir
- Keisha Renee Lewis – choir
- Kene Alexander – choir
- Kimberly A Jefferson – choir
- Kyrese Victoria Montgomery – choir
- LaMarcus Eldridge – choir
- Lanita Smith – choir
- Mariah Meshae Maxwell – choir
- Mark Justin-Paul Hood – choir
- Marqueta Pippens – choir
- Maurice Smith – choir
- Megan Parker – choir
- Melanie S. Tryggestad – choir
- Michael Shorts – choir
- Naarai Jacobs – choir
- Nikisha Grier-Daniels – choir
- Orlando Dotson – choir
- Porcha Clay – choir
- Princess Foster – choir
- Reesha Archibald – choir
- Rondez O. Rolle – choir
- Samantha N. Nelson – choir
- Sha’leah Nikole Stubblefield – choir
- Shana Andrews – choir
- Shanice Lorraine Knox – choir
- Sharon Marie Norwood – choir
- Shatisha Lawson – choir
- Steve Maurice Epting Jr – choir
- Synai Davis – choir
- Taelor Nevin Murphy – choir
- Tayler Green – choir
- Tickwanya Jones – choir
- Tiffanie Cross – choir
- Tiffany Stevenson – choir
- Vernon Burris Jr – choir
- William Harper – choir
- Zachary C. Moore – choir
- Paul Cornish – keys
- Nick Clark – bass
- Rico Nichols – drums
- Darius Woodley – drums
- Roland Gajate-Garci – drums
- Kyla Moscovich – horns
- Lasim Ahmed Richards – horns
- Marion Ross III – horns
- Cameron Johnson – horns
- Lemar Guillary – horns
- Chris Johnson – horns
- The Samples – choir
- Mike Dean – mixing
- Ant Clemons

== Charts ==
=== Weekly charts ===
Chart performance for Jesus Is Born
| Chart (2020) | Peak position |
|---|---|
| UK Album Downloads Chart (OCC) | 53 |
| UK Christian & Gospel Albums (OCC) | 3 |
| US Billboard 200 | 73 |
| US Independent Albums (Billboard) | 5 |
| US Top Gospel Albums (Billboard) | 2 |

=== Year-end charts ===
Year-end chart performance for Jesus Is Born
| Chart (2020) | Position |
|---|---|
| US Top Gospel Albums (Billboard) | 2 |
| Chart (2025) | Position |
| US Top Gospel Albums (Billboard) | 16 |

== Release history ==
| Region | Date | Format(s) | Label | Ref. |
|---|---|---|---|---|
| Various | December 25, 2019 | Digital download; streaming | INC | |
