= Every Hour =

Song by Kanye West featuring Sunday Service Choir

from the album Jesus Is King
- Released: October 25, 2019
- Recorded: 2019
- Genre: Gospel
- Length: 1:52
- Label: GOOD; Def Jam
- Songwriters: Kanye West; Benjamin Scholefield; Federico Vindver; Nikisha Grier
- Producers: Kanye West; Budgie; Federico Vindver

"Every Hour" is a song by American vocalist and record producer Kanye West, released as the opener of his ninth studio album, Jesus Is King (2019). Lacking any vocals from West, the song features a guest appearance from the Sunday Service Choir. The song was produced by West, Budgie, and Federico Vindver, who served as co-writers with Nikki Grier. A cinematic gospel track, it deploys bright piano notes and sped-up production. Lyrically, the Sunday Service Choir praise the presence of God in lives as they reference the hymn "Now Let Us Sing". The song received generally positive reviews from music critics, who highlighted the Sunday Service Choir's feature. Some praised the gospel composition and focused on its suitability for the vocals, while a number also believed the song benefited from West's absence.

"Every Hour" reached number 45 on the US Billboard Hot 100, becoming the group's first appearance on the chart. The song also reached the top 70 in Australia, Canada, Lithuania, and Portugal. It received a gold certification in the United States from the Recording Industry Association of America. The song was performed by the Sunday Service Choir at church locations in November 2019, two months before the group sang it during Awaken 2020 at Sun Devil Stadium. An intro rendition consisting of the song and "Selah" was recorded by West and Dr. Dre for their collaborative remix album, Jesus Is King Part II.

== Background ==
In 2019, West and vocal arranger Nikki Grier of his gospel group the Sunday Service Choir re-wrote the lyrics of songs by him. During this process, West took on the stance of wanting to create work related to God, setting out to make Christian music. Though some members of the Sunday Service Choir were initially dismissive of ideas by West, the group as a whole came around to being receptive. Throughout 2019, their concerts were popular with numerous celebrities, including actor Brad Pitt. The Sunday Service Choir were heavily involved with Jesus Is King vocally, providing additional vocals for the tracks "Selah", "Everything We Need", and "Water". "Every Hour" is the album's only track to be absent of vocals from West, solely featuring a hymn from the group. They later released their debut album Jesus Is Born on Christmas in 2019, which consists of solo tracks.

West utilizes the chipmunk soul sound from his early career on the song, speeding up its production and the Sunday Service Choir's solo vocals.

The song was produced by West, Budgie, and Federico Vindver, all of whom co-wrote it with Grier. (Note: Find additional credits for the song on the BMI Repertoire by searching the work number #49563338).) Jason White, a director of the Sunday Service Choir, revealed that he also worked on "Every Hour" vocally with them and West. West set out to craft a gospel record, with the song being the most traditional number to the genre on Jesus Is King. West's collaborative remix album Jesus Is King Part II with fellow record producer and rapper Dr. Dre leaked online in September 2023, featuring an intro that mixes and combines "Every Hour" with its following track "Selah".

== Composition and lyrics ==
Musically, "Every Hour" is a cinematic, upbeat gospel track. It features bright, sharp piano notes, alongside handclaps. The song's production is sped up, invoking the chipmunk soul style of West's early work. The Sunday Service Choir's layered vocals are also sped up, while at times the group appears to become out of sync with the production. "Every Hour" cuts out abruptly as it segues into "Selah", which commences the presence of West's vocals.

In the lyrics of the song, the Sunday Service Choir reference the gospel hymn "Now Let Us Sing". They deliver the hymn's line "Sing until the power of the Lord comes down", which itself draws from Psalm 59:16. The lyrical message praises the works, grace, and power of God in lives. The group also repeatedly sings of every hour, minute, and second.

== Release and promotion ==
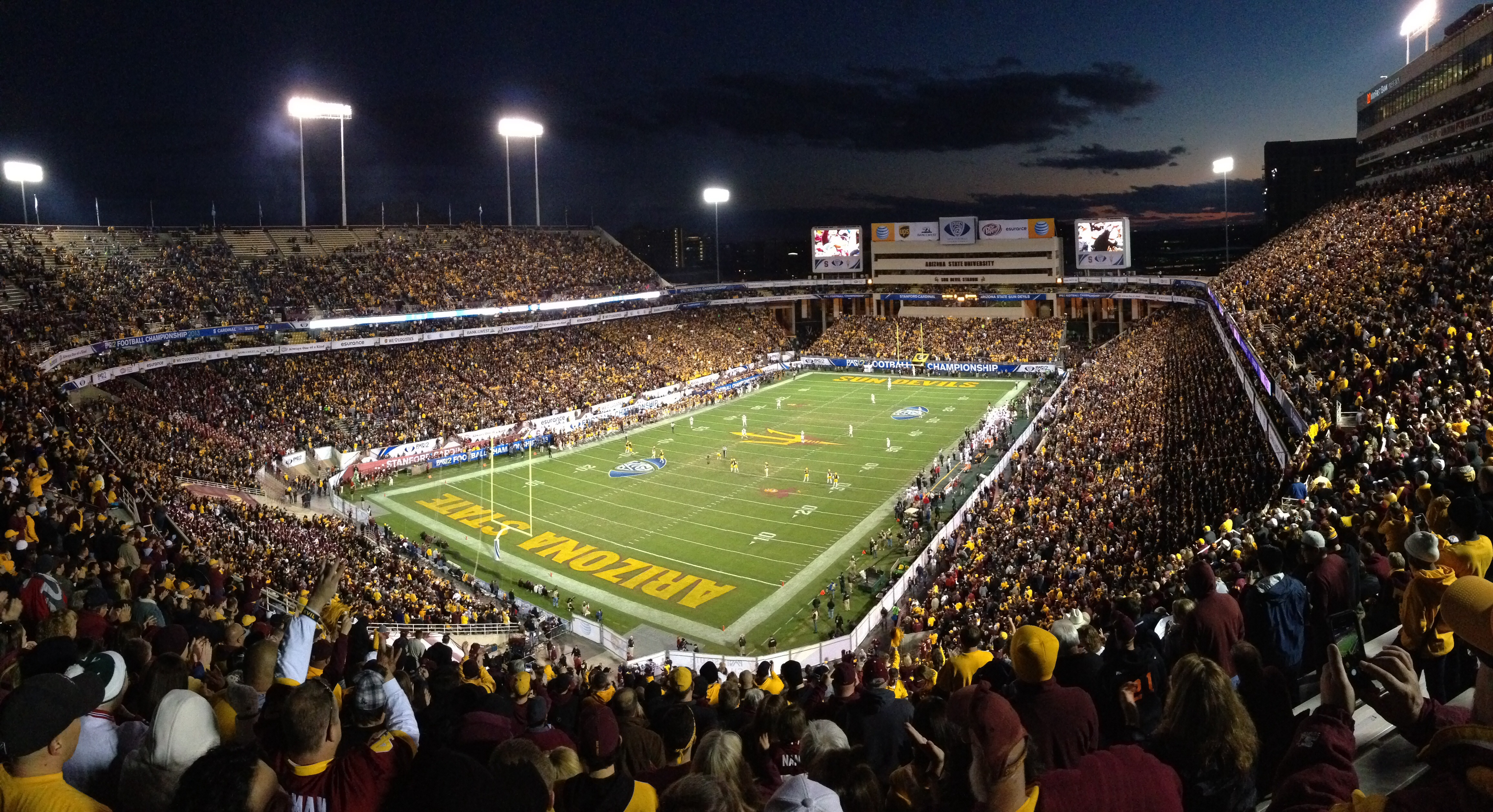
The song was performed during the Sunday Service Choir's set for Awaken 2020 at Sun Devil Stadium, standing as their last performance where West was absent before he joined for the album's succeeding number, "Selah".

On October 25, 2019, "Every Hour" was released as the opening track of West's ninth studio album Jesus Is King, replacing "Up from the Ashes" at this position. (Note: "Up from the Ashes" was later included on the deluxe version of West's Donda in November 2021.) West held a concert for the Sunday Service Choir at a field provided by Bethany Church in Baton Rouge on November 1, 2019, where the group performed the song. On November 17, a conductor led the Sunday Service Choir into performing it during a concert at Lakewood Church in Houston.

On January 18, 2020, the group performed the song for the Christian event Awaken at Sun Devil Stadium in Tempe, Arizona. This was the Sunday Service Choir's last number where West was not present, before they were joined by him during "Selah" and he blended in by wearing the same white clothing as them. West hosted the youth Strength to Stand Conference in Pigeon Forge, Tennessee in dedication to Jesus the following day from the event, featuring a performance of "Every Hour" from the group.

== Critical reception ==
"Every Hour" was met with generally positive reviews from music critics, garnering praise for the Sunday Service Choir's vocals. NME's Jordan Bassett saw it as the comedy song that West failed to achieve with "Lift Yourself" and its "poopy-di scoop" lines in 2018, commending how the group "implores us" to sing for the Lord's power. Bassett added that the song conveys euphoria in its composition and after an abrupt ending, the "stylistic touch [...] heightens the drama that follows" on Jesus Is King. The New York Times journalist Jon Caramanica identified the song as among the "hard sonic jolts" comparable to Yeezus (2013), where West establishes the Sunday Service Choir's "weapons-grade power" and he found it to resemble an alarm clock for the rapper overcoming his fatigue. In NOW Magazine, Matthew Progress called it a "punchy, traditional gospel number" and lauded the vocal layers as suitable for Kirk Franklin's own music. Aaron McKrell from HipHopDX noted the song's appeal of "an upbeat tribute to God", through both the music and vocals. Ivie Ani of NPR declared that the song beginning the album is a "very cinematic choice" for the gospel theme and it connects with traditional gospel listeners for sounding the closest to this genre from the Sunday Service Choir's vocals, marking "a standout sonically".

Ranking "Every Hour" as the album's seventh best track at Billboard, Carl Lamarre felt "a breath of triumph" from the group's vocals opening West's first record in a year and desired for them to have had a more prominent presence. Clint Rhodes from The Herald-Standard highlighted the "spirited opener" for the vocals singing of living a life "with God's mighty works, grace and power", while Entertainment Weekly's Brian Josephs called it a "jubilant opener" that succeeds from West's absence as he allows the "full-throated choir" to sing solo. Similarly, Edward Bowser of Soul in Stereo was taken back by the Sunday Service Choir's vocals that he considered to be pitch-perfect on every note, expressing disappointment in West making "the rest of Jesus Is King about him" as he usually does. In a mixed review for The Irish Times, Ed Power commented that the "cult-robes dangle heavily" on the "beatific and soporific" song as the group are the focus point over West, who sounds at peace. Power took discomfort in its numbness for asking "to bow down and be sermonised to"; this made him relieved that the film Jesus Is King was not being shown in Ireland.

== Commercial performance ==
Following the release of Jesus Is King, "Every Hour" debuted at number 45 on the US Billboard Hot 100, marking the Service Choir's first appearance on the chart. It also entered the US Hot Gospel Songs chart at number eight, standing as the album's only track to not appear both on this chart and the Christian Songs. For the Billboard year-end charts of both 2019 and 2020, the track ranked 14th on the Hot Gospel Songs. On July 17, 2026, "Every Hour" was certified gold by the Recording Industry Association of America (RIAA) for amassing 500,000 certified units in the United States.

In Canada, the track reached number 57 on the Canadian Hot 100. It performed best in Australia, reaching number 33 on the ARIA Singles Chart. Elsewhere, the track charted at numbers 61 and 70 in Lithuania and Portugal, respectively.

== Credits and personnel ==
Credits adapted from Tidal and the BMI Repertoire.

- Kanye West – production, songwriter
- Budgie – production, songwriter
- Federico Vindver – production, songwriter, mixer
- Nikisha Grier – songwriter
- Sunday Service Choir – additional vocals
- Josh Berg – recording engineer
- Josh Bales – recording engineer
- Shane Fitzgibbon – recording engineer
- Mike Dean – mastering

== Charts ==
=== Weekly charts ===
Chart performance for "Every Hour"
Chart (2019)	Peak position
Australia (ARIA)	33
Canada Hot 100 (Billboard)	57
France (SNEP)	131
Lithuania (AGATA)	61
Portugal (AFP)	70
Slovakia Singles Digital (ČNS IFPI)	74
UK Hip Hop/R&B (Official Charts)	21
US Billboard Hot 100	45
US Hot Gospel Songs (Billboard)	8
US Rolling Stone Top 100	12

=== Year-end charts ===
2019 year-end chart performance for "Every Hour"
Chart (2019)	Position
US Hot Gospel Songs (Billboard)	14

2020 year-end chart performance for "Every Hour"
Chart (2020)	Position
US Hot Gospel Songs (Billboard)	14

== Certifications ==
Certifications for "Every Hour"
Region	Certification	Certified units/sales
United States (RIAA)	Gold	500,000^{‡}
^{‡} Sales+streaming figures based on certification alone.

== See also ==
- Selah (song)
