= Sunday Service Choir =

American gospel group

- Logo used for Sunday Service's 2019 Easter Coachella performance

Background information
- Origin: Los Angeles, California, U.S.
- Genres: Gospel; Christian hip hop; Christian R&B
- Years active: 2019–present
- Past members: Donald "DēP" Paige; Ray Romulus; Ant Clemons; Tony Williams; Kanye West
- Website: sundayservice.com (now deactivated)

The Sunday Service Choir (commonly referred to as Sunday Service) is an American gospel group which was founded by rapper Kanye West and conducted by choir director Jason White. Beginning in January 2019, and initially produced by Jack and Michael Skolnick, the group has performed every Sunday as well as on Friday, September 27, when West's album Jesus Is King was announced for release. Their debut album, Jesus Is Born (2019), was released three months later on Christmas Day. In 2025, the group's official website was deactivated, and its status is in question.

== History ==
In September 2018, West announced that his ninth studio album Yandhi would be released later in the month. He later postponed the date to November 2018 in order to record in Uganda. The album was postponed a second time in November with no set release date. On the first Sunday of 2019, West began the first "Sunday Service" rehearsal, where he performed gospel iterations of his discography and other songs with a choir group, The Samples and frequent collaborators like Tony Williams, Francis and the Lights, and Ant Clemons. During Sunday Service rehearsals, several songs from Yandhi have been performed.

On January 12, 2019, it was reported that West was replaced by Ariana Grande as a headliner for Coachella. West pulled out because a giant dome could not be constructed for the performance. On March 31, 2019, West announced that Sunday Service would perform an Easter set at Coachella. The first public Sunday Service performance was at Coachella for Easter on April 21, 2019. On October 5, 2019, he brought Sunday Service to The Gateway in Salt Lake City, Utah. His performance occurred on an already busier than usual weekend with the Church of Jesus Christ of Latter-day Saints holding their semi-annual General Conference the same weekend.

West collaborated with pastor Joel Osteen, who hosted West at Lakewood Church located in Houston on November 17, 2019. Although the tickets were free for the event, those who had tickets began to sell them online for up to $500. On November 21, 2019, Sunday Service announced that they would be a part of the youth Strength to Stand Conference, which would be held at LeConte Center in Pigeon Forge, Tennessee from January 18–20, 2020. West's performance was added after comedian John Crist's performance was canceled after Crist was suspected of sexual misconduct. On November 28, 2019, West released the "Closed on Sunday" videoclip on YouTube, where the group appeared in the last part of the song adding additional vocals, not included in the studio version of the song. On December 25, 2019, Sunday Service released Jesus is Born as West had said. Exactly a year later Sunday Service released the Emmanuel EP, featuring five new tracks composed and produced entirely by West in Latin, based on texts from the Roman Breviary and the Roman Gradual.

In 2022, the group featured on Quadeca's album I Didn't Mean to Haunt You, on the tenth track "Fractions of Infinity". Quadeca later released a video showing the behind the scenes of the feature, called "Those Words Don't Do You Justice."

The group returned in 2024 on the Will Smith comeback single "You Can Make It", featuring the singer Fridayy. It was Smith's first new song in nearly two decades.

According to West, the logo was changed to the sig runes of the Schutzstaffel in March 2025.

In 2025, singers associated with West's Sunday Service contributed backing vocals to Dinastía, a collaborative album by Mexican artists Peso Pluma and Tito Double P.

== Discography ==
=== Studio albums ===
Title	Album details	Peak chart positions	
Title	Album details	US	US Gospel
Jesus Is Born	Released: December 25, 2019; Label: INC; Format: Streaming audio, digital download	73	2
Go Tell It	Released: October 25, 2024; Label: Platoon; Format: Streaming audio	—	—

=== Extended plays ===
Title	Album details
Emmanuel	Released: December 25, 2020; Label: INC; Format: streaming audio, digital download

=== Charted songs ===
Title	Year	Peak chart positions	Album
Title	Year	US Gospel	Album
"Father Stretch"	2020	10	Jesus Is Born
"Ultralight Beam"	2020	11	Jesus Is Born
"Rain"	2020	15	Jesus Is Born
"Count Your Blessings"	2020	16	Jesus Is Born
"Revelations 19:1"	2020	17	Jesus Is Born
"Excellent"	2020	20	Jesus Is Born
"Follow Me / Fade"	2020	22	Jesus Is Born
"Lift Up Your Voices"	2020	24	Jesus Is Born
"More Than Anything"	2020	25	Jesus Is Born
"—" denotes a recording that did not chart or was not released in that territory.

==== As featured artist ====
Title	Year	Peak chart positions									Album
Title	Year	US	US Afro	US Gospel	AUS	CAN	FRA	NG	UK R&B	UK Afro	Album
"Every Hour" (Kanye West featuring Sunday Service Choir)	2019	45	—	8	33	57	131	—	21	—	Jesus Is King
"Stand Strong" (Davido featuring Sunday Service Choir)	2022	—	9	—	—	—	—	6	—	9	Non-album single
"Fractions of Infinity" (Quadeca featuring Sunday Service Choir)	2022										I Didn't Mean to Haunt You
"You Can Make It" (Will Smith featuring Fridayy and Sunday Service Choir)	2024	—	—	3	—	—	—	—	—	—	Based on a True Story
"Thank God" (T.I., Young Dro, and Kirk Franklin featuring Sunday Service Choir)	2024	—	—	6	—	—	—	—	—	—	Kill the King
"—" denotes a recording that did not chart or was not released in that territory.

=== Guest appearances ===
List of non-single guest appearances, with other performing artists, showing year released and album name
Title	Year	Other artist(s)	Notes	Album
"Every Hour"	2019	Kanye West	Featured vocals	Jesus Is King
"Selah"	2019	Kanye West	Additional vocals	Jesus Is King
"Everything We Need"	2019	Kanye West, Ant Clemons, Ty Dolla Sign	Additional vocals	Jesus Is King
"Water"	2019	Kanye West, Ant Clemons	Additional vocals	Jesus Is King
"No Luck"	2021	KayCyy	Additional vocals	Non-album single
"Jail"	2021	Kanye West, Jay-Z	Additional vocals	Donda
"Hurricane"	2021	Kanye West, The Weeknd, Lil Baby	Additional vocals	Donda
"24"	2021	Kanye West	Additional vocals	Donda
"Donda"	2021	Kanye West	Additional vocals	Donda
"Jesus Lord"	2021	Kanye West, Jay Electronica	Additional vocals	Donda
"New Again"	2021	Kanye West	Additional vocals	Donda
"Lord I Need You"	2021	Kanye West	Additional vocals	Donda
"Finish Line"	2021	Elton John, Stevie Wonder	Additional vocals	The Lockdown Sessions
"Up from the Ashes"	2021	Kanye West	Additional vocals	Donda (Deluxe)
"Fractions of Infinity"	2022	Quadeca	Featured vocals	I Didn't Mean to Haunt You
"My Soul"	2024	¥$, Big TC	Additional vocals	Vultures 2
"Jesus"	2026	M.I.A.	Featured vocals	M.I.7
"Calling"	2026	M.I.A.	Featured vocals	M.I.7

=== Opera performances ===
- Nebuchadnezzar (2019)
- Mary (2019)
