= Up from the Ashes (song) =

Song by Kanye West

from the album Donda (Deluxe)
- Released: November 14, 2021
- Recorded: 2019
- Length: 2:42
- Songwriters: Kanye West; Alex Ernewein; Angel Lopez; Federico Vindver; Gene Thornton; Matthew Sean Leon; Nikisha Shenise Grier; Rennard East; Terrence Thornton; Timothy Mosley
- Producers: Kanye West; Alex Ernewein; Sean Leon

"Up from the Ashes" is a song by American rapper Kanye West from the deluxe version of his tenth solo studio album, Donda (2021). The song was initially intended for West's ninth studio album Jesus Is King (2019), under the name "Glade", and was previewed during listening parties in September and October 2019. West's singing on the song has been compared to his fourth studio album 808s & Heartbreak (2008). The song leaked online in February 2020 alongside an alternate version featuring production done by Dr. Dre.

== Background and recording ==
In 2019, fellow Canadian rapper and songwriter Sean Leon had a demo titled "The Glade" under his own artist project. While working on Daniel Caesar's Case Study 01 in Los Angeles, collaborator River Tiber recommended sharing the demo with West at one of his Sunday Service performances. The song ended up on an early track listing of Jesus Is King as "Glade", later being renamed to "Up from the Ashes". Sean Leon went to record with West in Calabasas two weeks later, writing on "Selah", "Use This Gospel" and "Jesus Is Lord" on Jesus Is King.

In August 2019, American recording artist Kanye West's wife, American media personality Kim Kardashian, announced that her husband's ninth studio would be titled Jesus Is King. On September 27, 2019, West held a listening party for the album at the Fox Theatre in Detroit, Michigan. Kardashian shared a track list via Twitter that included "Up from the Ashes" as the album's introduction. During a listening party in New York City on September 29, 2019, the track was renamed "Beauty from Ashes". The same day, a phone recording of one of the Jesus Is King listening sessions was uploaded online, which included "Up from the Ashes". The final track list revealed in October 2019 didn't include "Up from the Ashes". "Every Hour", a triumphant song performed by the Sunday Service Choir, served as the album's introduction instead. Jesus Is King was released on October 25, 2019.

On November 18, 2019, West announced on Twitter that he was working with American recording artist Dr. Dre on a sequel collaborative project Jesus Is King Part II. On January 16, 2020, a snippet of "Up from the Ashes" featuring production from Dr. Dre was leaked online. This track would later be leaked in full on February 28, 2020. Another Jesus Is King Part II track, "LA Monster", would later leak in March 2020.

== Release ==
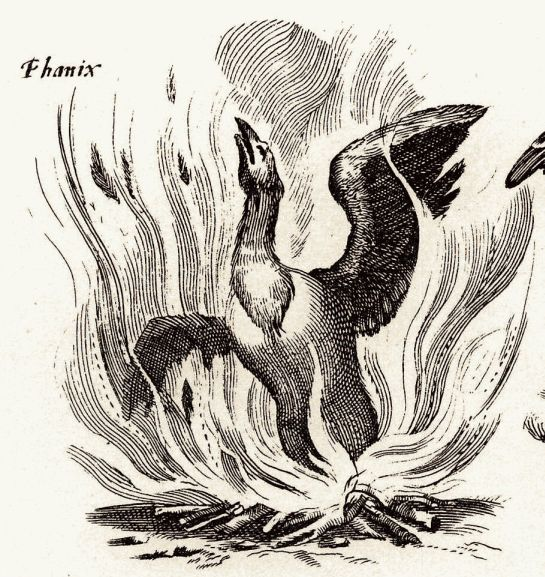
The song's title is inspired by the mythical phoenix rising from its ashes

"Up from the Ashes" was previewed at listening sessions for Jesus is King back in September 2019, but was ultimately not included on the album. On October 28, the Donda stem player, a device that allows for its user to remix songs from Donda, was made available by West. The stem player included the previously unreleased song "Up from the Ashes", as well as two other unreleased songs: "Never Abandon Your Family" and "Life of the Party". "Up from the Ashes" was officially released as part of the Donda deluxe album on November 14, 2021.

== Composition and lyrics ==
The song's title refers to the phrase "rise from the ashes", which invokes the legend of the phoenix resurrecting from destruction. Remy Gelenidza of Southpawer wrote that the song also invokes the resurrection of Jesus, connecting to the overall Christian theme present on Jesus Is King. Michael Saponara of Billboard wrote that West "seems to shed his ego" by highlighting the lyrics "I come to you empty, free of my pride." West uses heavy auto-tune similar to the style used on his fourth studio album 808s & Heartbreak (2008). Danilo Castro of Heavy.com also compared West's singing to his melodies on 808s & Heartbreak, along with certain moments from his seventh studio album The Life of Pablo (2016). The Jesus Is King version of the song featured minimal production.

== Critical reception ==
After attending the September 2019 listening party for Jesus Is King in New York, Michael Saponara of Billboard called the track a "fulfilling album opener". Gary Graff, also writing for Billboard, described the song as a "brassy opener". Kiana Fitzgerald of Vibe stated the song seemed like a track that Chance the Rapper would have included on his third mixtape Coloring Book (2016). Sam Murphy of Cool Accidents wrote that the song was gentle and flowering, thus it wasn't "an indication of the rest of the album Jesus Is King which reaches for something larger."

== Personnel ==
Credits adapted from Tidal.

- Kanye West – vocals, production, song writing
- Sunday Service Choir – additional vocals
- Alex Ernewein – production, song writing
- Sean Leon – production, song writing
- Angel Lopez – co-production, song writing
- Federico Vindver – co-production, song writing
- Timbaland – co-production, song writing
- Ab-Liva – song writing
- No Malice – song writing
- Pusha T – song writing
- Nikki Grier – song writing
- Irko – mixing, mastering
- Stef Moro – mastering assistance
- Josh Berg – recording

== Charts ==
Chart performance for "Up from the Ashes"
Chart (2021)	Peak position
US Hot Christian Songs (Billboard)	26
US Gospel Songs (Billboard)	17
