= Ant Clemons =

American singer

- Born: Anthony Clemons Jr. September 26, 1991 (age 35); Willingboro, New Jersey, U.S.
- Genres: R&B; pop rap
- Occupations: Singer; rapper; songwriter
- Years active: 2016–present
- Labels: Legion; Human Re Sources
- Member of: Sunday Service Choir
- Website: antclemons.com

Anthony Clemons Jr. (born September 26, 1991) is an American singer, rapper and songwriter from Willingboro Township, New Jersey. He rose to prominence as a guest performer on Kanye West's 2018 single "All Mine", after which he contributed to West's Wyoming Sessions and subsequent album, Jesus Is King (2019). Clemons' debut studio album, Happy 2 Be Here (2020) was nominated for Best R&B Album at the 63rd Annual Grammy Awards; with a total of four, his three other nominations yielded from his songwriting work on albums for Mary J. Blige and H.E.R. Clemons is also known for his contributions to the original version of West's 2021 single, "Hurricane", as well as other songs intended for the latter's tenth album Donda (2021), most of which remain unreleased.

== Early life ==
Clemons was born and raised in Willingboro, New Jersey. His musical taste was shaped by his parents playing Michael Jackson, The Notorious B.I.G. and Stevie Wonder. At age four, Clemons began performing at birthday parties as a Jackson impersonator. While studying at Burlington County Institute of Technology, Clemons was part of the youth choir at the Sharon Baptist Church and joined The Heritage Players and Showstoppers at Willingboro High School. At family events, Clemons would sing with his sisters Ashley and Amber as the "Clemons Trio". In 2009, during his parents' divorce, Clemons began his interest in songwriting. Clemons began recording himself and producing music with Pro Tools and Logic. Clemons attended a semester at Burlington County College before dropping out.

== Career ==
Clemons began his songwriting career in 2016. While working at Red Lobster in Cherry Hill, Clemons flew to Los Angeles bi-weekly in an attempt to meet songwriters and producers. He would return to Philadelphia every time he ran out of money. He studied songwriting at White Hall Arts Academy with Tanisha Hall. Clemons' mother ultimately supported him in permanently moving to Los Angeles, where Clemons slept on two friends' floors. Clemons wrote a song a day in exchange for rent. In Los Angeles, Clemons met record producer Ryan Toby, who gave him the opportunity to work on Luke James' 2017 single "Drip" – Clemons' first major songwriting credit.

In January 2018, Clemons met Nigerian record producer Bongo ByTheWay, and upon doing so, they recorded eleven collaborative tracks in a single day. After the two quickly became acquainted, Bongo ByTheWay introduced Clemons to Chicago singer Jeremih; Clemons recorded the hook for a Jeremih demo titled "All Mine". After Jeremih's invitation to Kanye West's Wyoming ranch, the demo was played and reworked into the version heard on his eighth studio album Ye, which utilized Clemons' demo.

West then invited Clemons himself to the ranch to write and record demos for Teyana Taylor's second studio album K.T.S.E., on which he provided additional vocals on its song "Hurry". Clemons saw an increase in fame after working with West. In September 2018, Clemons was invited to Chicago by West and Chance the Rapper to work on West's ninth studio album. Known at the time as Yandhi, Clemons was to serve as a guest feature on seven out of its eight tracks. Several leaked songs from the album featured Clemons performing demo verses for West. Yandhi was reworked and released as Jesus Is King in October 2019, where Clemons was credited on the tracks "Selah", "Everything We Need", and "Water".

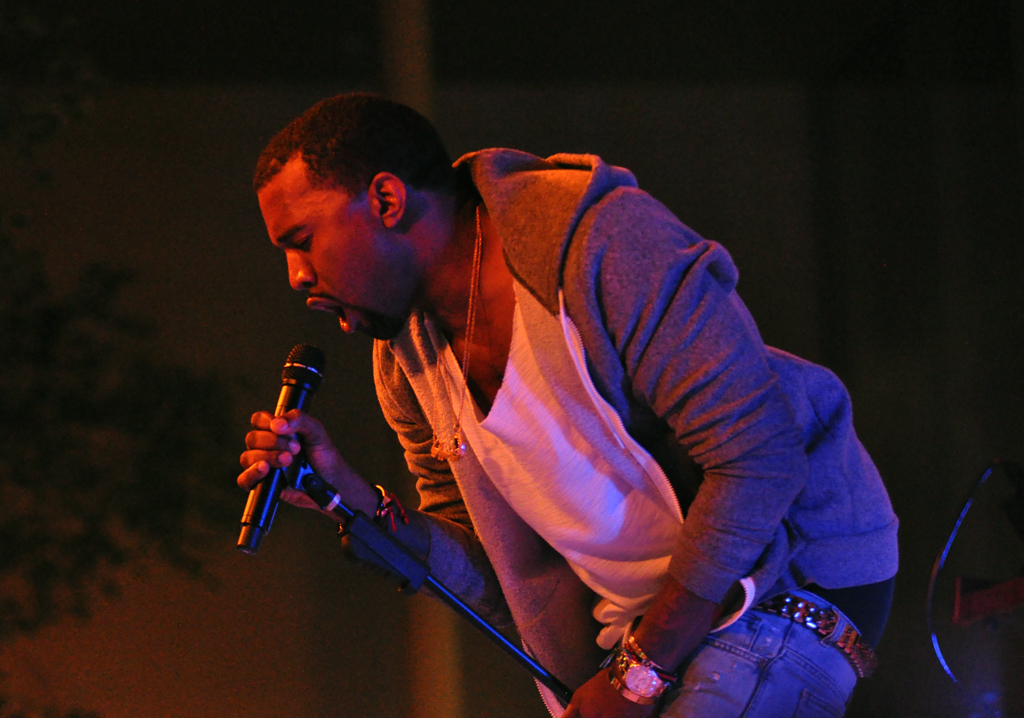
Clemons saw an increase in fame after rapper Kanye West (pictured) included him on his 2018 album Ye.

Formed in January 2019, Clemons and the Wrldfms Tony Williams became the lead vocalists for West's Sunday Service Choir. That same year, Clemons worked with Beyoncé to co-write the song "Mood 4 Eva" for the soundtrack album The Lion King: The Gift. Clemons was invited to the 62nd Annual Grammy Awards for his work with Beyoncé, Cordae, Chance the Rapper, Skrillex, Boys Noize, and Ty Dolla Sign. Clemons co-wrote Camila Cabello's 2020 single "My Oh My" featuring DaBaby; the song peaked at number 12 on the Billboard Hot 100. In March 2020, Clemons released his debut album Happy 2 Be Here, which featured guest performances by Ty Dolla Sign, Timbaland, and Pharrell Williams. In December 2020, it was nominated at the 63rd Annual Grammy Awards for Best R&B Album.

In December 2020, Clemons released his collaboration with Justin Timberlake, "Better Days". The duo debuted the song at a virtual concert fundraiser organized by Democratic politician Stacey Abrams, with proceeds going towards the Senate runoff election in Georgia. Clemons, along with Timberlake, Bruce Springsteen, Demi Lovato, and Bon Jovi, performed at the inauguration of Joe Biden on January 20, 2021.

On February 26, 2021, Clemons released a reissue of his debut album, Happy 2 Be Here, as HAPPY 2 BE HERE (Anniversary Edition), with an additional song: "June 1st", commemorating the release of his 2018 breakthrough hit "All Mine" with Kanye West.

In 2024, Clemons wrote on the song "Talking / Once Again" from Kanye West and Ty Dolla Sign's (¥$) collaborative album Vultures 1. The song moderately entered the Billboard Hot 100, while the album debuted atop the Billboard 200. For ¥$'s follow-up album Vultures 2, released on 3 August of the same year, he provided additional vocals on the track "Sky City" along with American singer-songwriter The-Dream.

== Discography ==
=== Albums ===
- Happy 2 Be Here (2020)

=== EPs ===
- 4Play (2022)

=== Collaborative albums ===
- Jesus Is Born (2019) (as Sunday Service Choir)

=== Singles ===
Title	Year	Peak chart positions		Album
Title	Year	US	NZ Hot	Album
"4 Letter Word" (featuring Timbaland)	2019	—	—	Happy 2 Be Here
"Excited" (with Ty Dolla Sign)	2019	—	—	Happy 2 Be Here
"Beep"	2020	—	—	Happy 2 Be Here
"Freak"	2020	—	—	TBA
"Better Days" (with Justin Timberlake)	2020	94	34	TBA

=== Promotional singles ===
Title	Year	Album
"Mama I Made It"	2019	Happy 2 Be Here

=== Features ===
Title	Year	Other artist(s)	Album
"All Mine"	2018	Kanye West, Ty Dolla Sign	Ye
"13th Amendment"	2018	Kash Doll	27: The Most Perfect Album
"Bad Idea" (Note: Additional vocals)	2019	Cordae, Chance the Rapper, SiR	The Lost Boy
"Good Enough"	2019	Jim-E Stack	Ephemera
"Full Time Cappers"	2019	G-Eazy, French Montana, Moneybagg Yo	Scary Nights
"Selah"	2019	Kanye West, Bongo ByTheWay, Sunday Service Choir	Jesus Is King
"Everything We Need"	2019	Kanye West, Ty Dolla Sign, Sunday Service Choir	Jesus Is King
"Water"	2019	Kanye West, Sunday Service Choir	Jesus Is King
"Thanks Ye"	2020	Consequence, Bongo ByTheWay, Kaycyy Pluto	No Cap Pack
"Wonder Years"	2020	Noah Cyrus	The End of Everything
"Gifted" (Note: Uncredited vocals)	2020	Cordae, Roddy Ricch	From a Birds Eye View
"Baptize"	2020	Spillage Village, JID, EarthGang	Spilligion
"Extra Special"	2021	Wale	Folarin 2
"Wait for Me"	2022	Takis, Goody Grace	Welcome Home
"Stand for Something"	2026	Dahi, Baby Rose, Jesse Boykins III	Black Boy (Alternative)

== Awards and nominations ==
Year	Awards	Nominated work	Category	Result
2021	63rd Annual Grammy Awards	Happy 2 Be Here	Best R&B Album	Nominated
