= White Hall Arts Academy =

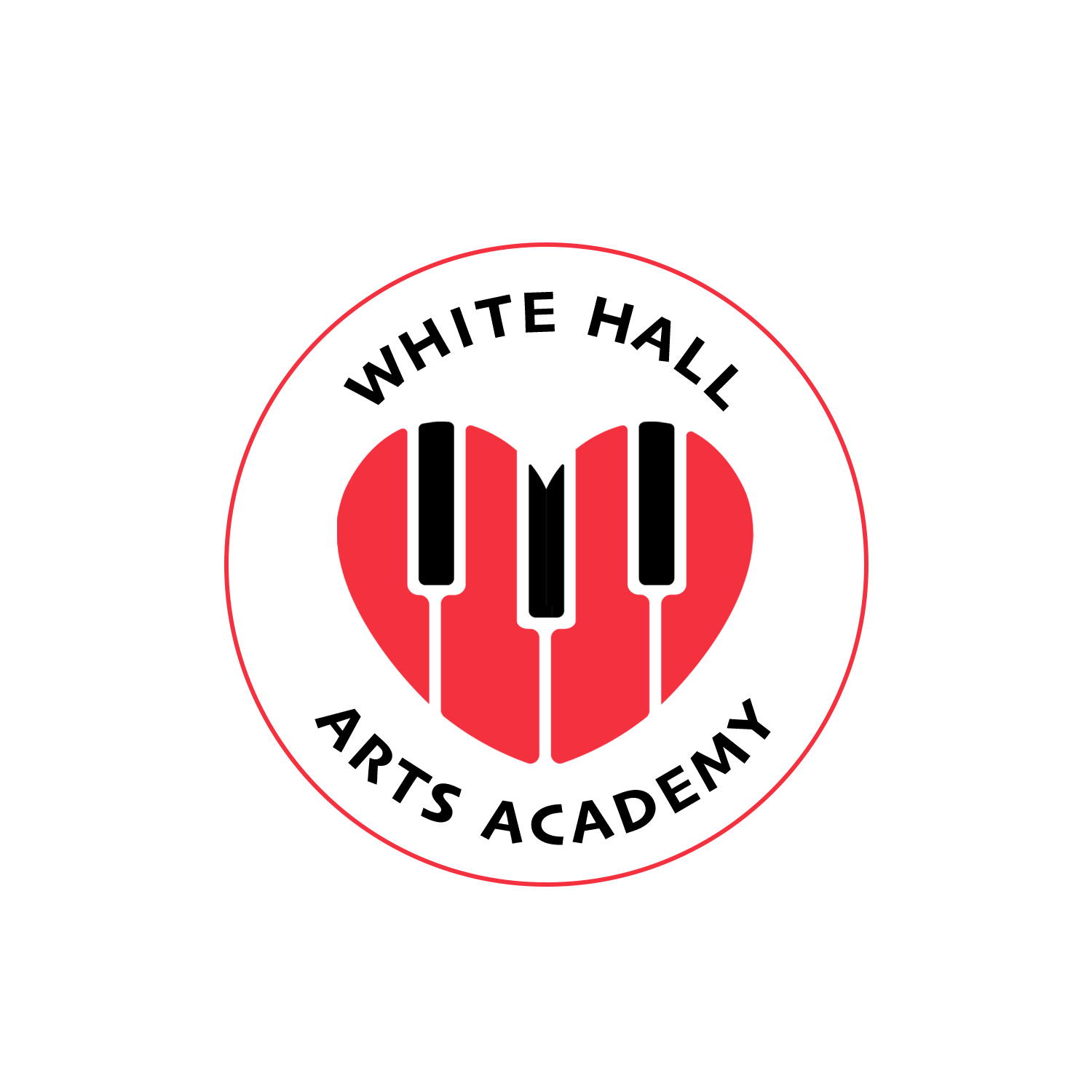
- Abbreviation: WHAA
- Formation: 2011; 15 years ago
- Founder: Tanisha Hall
- Type: Nonprofit
- Legal status: 501(c)(3) organization
- Purpose: Provide music and arts education for underserved students
- Headquarters: Los Angeles, California
- Location: South Los Angeles, United States
- Services: Music, Voice, Dance, and Visual and Digital Arts Education
- Executive Director: Tanisha Hall
- Award: Lewis Prize for Music
- Website: whitehallacademy.org

White Hall Arts Academy is a non-profit 501(c)(3) organization founded in Los Angeles, California in 2011. The academy offers numerous arts programs for underserved youth and adults such as voice, guitar, violin, piano, bass, drums, horns, songwriting, dance, bands, and ensembles in group classes and private or semi-private lessons. Former students have appeared in films, commercials, and television series including American Idol, The Voice and America's Got Talent. Hall worked with the Chaka Khan Foundation with children in Watts, California which inspired her to start her arts academy in South Los Angeles.

== History ==
White Hall Arts Academy was founded in 2011 by Tanisha Hall, a Berklee College of Music graduate. Hall began teaching privately in her home in 2002 offering low cost music lessons but demand led to the idea of a conservatory style school serving the community. The school is located in the Crenshaw district of South Los Angeles and serves underserved students who might not otherwise have access to the arts. Hall's grandparents, Marvin and Fannie White, purchased the building in 1978 where Fannie owned and operated a beauty salon, Whitehouse Beauty Salon. Fannie let Hall know that there was a vacancy for lease in the building where she could start a music school and she leased the 2-story space where she constructed her academy. WHAA has also worked with injured veterans providing them with music lessons as a form of therapy.

In January 2014, the WHAA entered into a partnership with the City of Los Angeles to offer a free after-school community music program of classes for children ages 4–18. The program began with 25 children and in a year, enrollment had grown to over 125 children. Additionally, WHAA expanded its reach by partnering with local organizations such as Community Build, the Al Wooten Youth Center and the Right Way Foundation to provide music education and career training services. In 2021, due to the pandemic, Hall launched the HeARTBeats Virtual Arts Program, which opened its doors to underserved students internationally.

In 2020, WHAA was awarded $25,000 by the Covid Response Award by the Lewis Prize for Music as well as receiving their Infusion Award in 2022 for $50,000 in funding. Hall told that the funds were going to allow them to expand their efforts and better support their students. Hall is a foster parent as well and provides all children from the Foster care system services at no cost.

== Notable alumni ==
- Ant Clemons (Grammy Award winner)
- Jordyn Simone (American Idol, The Voice contestant)
- Harrell Holmes (Broadway play actor Ain't Too Proud, the Life and Times of The Temptations)
