= Better Days (Ant Clemons song) =

2020 single by Ant Clemons featuring Justin Timberlake

Single by Ant Clemons featuring Justin Timberlake
- Released: December 3, 2020
- Genre: Pop; R&B
- Length: 3:18
- Label: A Blessing; Legion; Human Re Sources
- Songwriters: Anthony Clemons Jr.; Justin Timberlake; Jacob Kasher Hindlin; Kenyon Dixon
- Producers: Clemons; Timberlake; BongoByTheWay; 1500 or Nothin'

Ant Clemons singles chronology
"Gifted" (2020)	"Better Days" (2020)	"Story of My Life" (2021)

Justin Timberlake singles chronology
"Don't Slack" (2020)	"Better Days" (2020)	"Stay with Me" (2022)

"Better Days" is a single by American singer Ant Clemons featuring American singer Justin Timberlake, released on December 3, 2020. The two wrote the song alongside Jacob Kasher Hindlin and Kenyon Dixon and produced it alongside by BongoByTheWay and 1500 or Nothin'.

== Background ==
Ant Clemons and Justin Timberlake wrote the song during the COVID-19 lockdowns, in reaction to the many adversities that the world had encountered in 2020 and with the purpose of inspiring hope. After they had a conversation about this matter during their first Zoom call, Clemons developed the song's idea and sent it over to Timberlake. They worked on the song over the next few months. On December 3, 2020, the singers debuted the song at the Rock the Runoff virtual concert, hosted by Stacey Abrams as a fundraiser for Fair Fight Action to mobilize voters for the Georgia senate runoff elections on January 5, 2021.

== Live performances ==
Ant Clemons and Justin Timberlake performed the song with the assistance of gospel musician Kirk Franklin at the Stax Museum of American Soul Music in Memphis, Tennessee as part of Celebrating America, a television special honoring the inauguration of Joe Biden on January 20, 2021. This version of the song was released to streaming services later that day.

== Charts ==
Chart performance for "Better Days"
Chart (2020–2021)	Peak position
New Zealand Hot Singles (RMNZ)	34
US Billboard Hot 100	94
US Adult Pop Airplay (Billboard)	33
US Hot R&B/Hip-Hop Songs (Billboard)	31
