= Selah (song) =

2019 song by Kanye West

Song by Kanye West

from the album Jesus Is King
- Released: October 25, 2019
- Recorded: 2018–2019
- Genre: Christian hip hop; gospel
- Length: 2:45
- Label: GOOD; Def Jam
- Songwriters: Kanye West; Cydel Young; Dexter Mills, Jr.; Federico Vindver; Gene Thornton; Jahmal Gwin; Jeffrey LaValley; Rennard East; Terrence Thornton; Evan Mast; Matthew Leon; John Boyd; Adam Wright
- Producers: Kanye West; E*vax

"Selah" is a song by American rapper Kanye West from his ninth studio album, Jesus Is King (2019). The song contains additional vocals from Ant Clemons, BongoByTheWay, and the Sunday Service Choir. West co-wrote it with 11 others, while Jeffrey LaValley received songwriting credit due to the song sampling a rendition of the New Jerusalem Choir's work. A hip hop and gospel song, it instrumentally relies on military drums. The song includes samples of the Sunday Service Choir's rendition of "Revelations 19:1". Lyrically, it sees West asserting his Christian faith and referencing Bible verses. The song had originally been slated for release on Yandhi in November 2018 until the album was scrapped, though it later leaked the following year.

Ultimately released as the second track on Jesus Is King in October 2019, the song received generally positive reviews from music critics. They were often complementary towards the composition and a few praised the sampling of the Sunday Service Choir, though some critics expressed negative feelings of the lyrical content. The song was among the Winning Gospel Songs at the 2021 ASCAP Rhythm & Soul Awards. It charted at number 19 on the US Billboard Hot 100 and also reached the top 20 in Australia, Canada, Latvia, and the United Kingdom. The song has been certified gold in the United States by the Recording Industry Association of America (RIAA). West and the Sunday Service Choir performed the song live in November 2019. It was used for the Super Bowl LIV and Super Bowl LV trailers of the tenth Fast & Furious franchise film, F9 (2021). The album's accompanying film of the same name features an alternative version of the song. An intro rendition consisting of "Selah" and "Every Hour" was recorded by West and Dr. Dre for their collaborative remix album, Jesus Is King Part II.

A rendition of the New Jerusalem Choir's "Revelations 19:1" was released on the Sunday Service Choir's debut studio album, Jesus Is Born (2019). Despite being sampled within "Selah", the former was released two months later. A gospel song, the rendition includes a chorus that features praise for Jesus Christ being delivered by the Sunday Service Choir. It charted at number 17 on the US Billboard Gospel Songs chart in 2020. The rendition has been performed live by the Sunday Service Choir on multiple occasions.

== Background and development ==
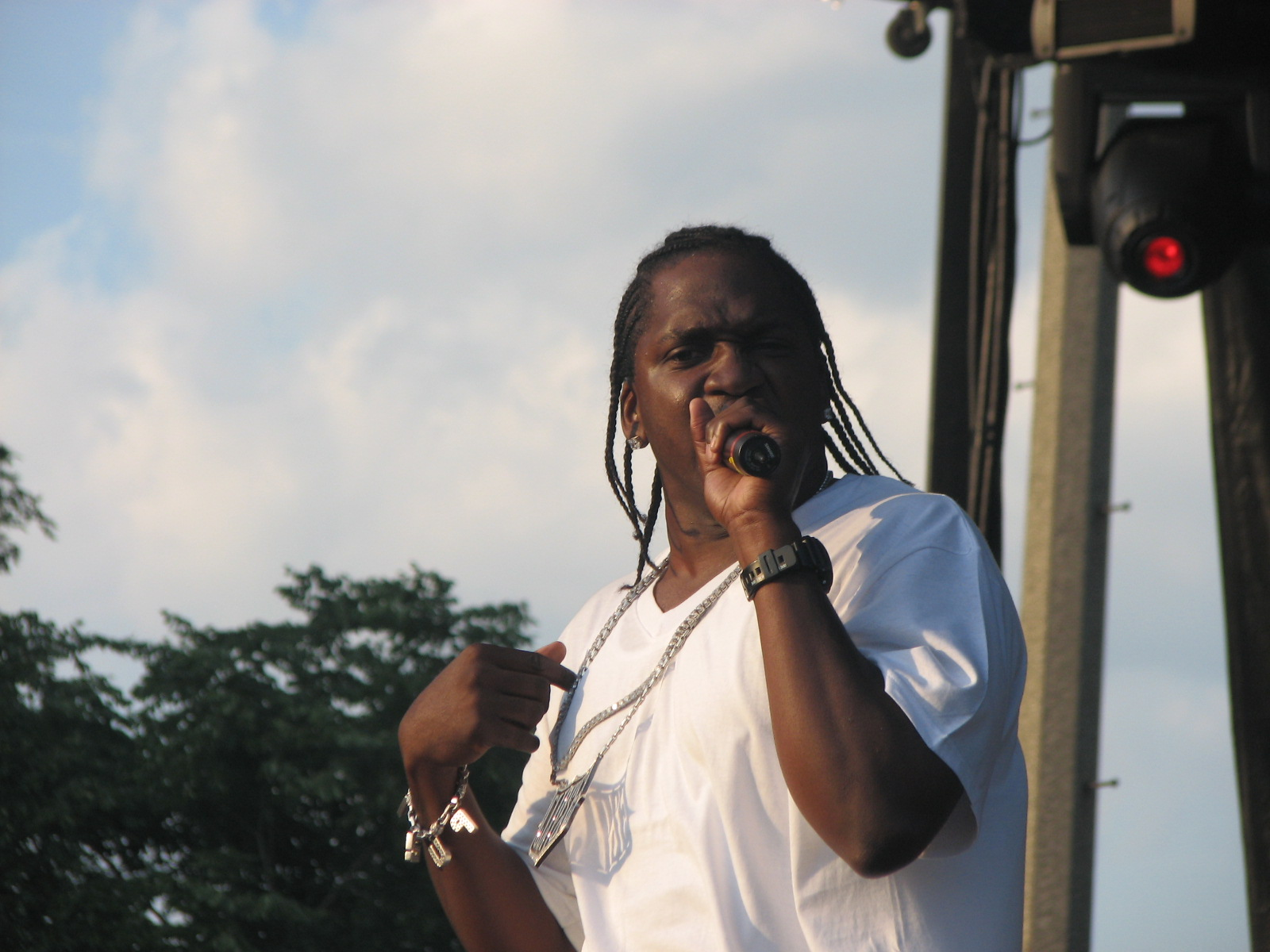
In October 2019, the song was leaked, which provoked criticism from GOOD Music president Pusha T.

American singer-songwriter Ant Clemons first became involved with West during the recording sessions for the rapper's eight studio album Ye (2018), with Clemons helping record the album's second single "All Mine" (2018). Following on from Clemons being involved with West as a songwriter for Teyana Taylor's second studio album K.T.S.E. in June 2018, the two of them didn't see each other again until the fall of that year. At that time, Clemons went to Chicago and found himself freestyling in front of others, including West. During the freestyle session, Clemons gave West a demo he worked on, off of which they built the skeleton of "Selah", originally called "Chakras". As well as helping create the song and providing backing vocals for it, Clemons contributed vocals to fellow Jesus Is King tracks "Everything We Need" and "Water".

In 2019, West and vocal arranger Nikki Grier of his gospel group the Sunday Service Choir re-wrote the lyrics of songs by him. During this process, West took on the stance of wanting to create music related to God, setting out to make Christian music. Though some members of the Sunday Service Choir had been dismissive of ideas by West, the group as a whole came around to being receptive. Throughout 2019, the Sunday Service Choir's concerts were popular with numerous celebrities, including American actor Brad Pitt. The group were heavily involved with Jesus Is King vocally, providing additional vocals for "Everything We Need" and "Water". "Selah" is the album's first track where West is present, after the opener "Every Hour" that consists of solo vocals from the Sunday Service Choir. Alongside the group and Clemons, the track includes additional vocals from record producer Bongo ByTheWay.

West had originally planned to release "Selah" on Yandhi in November 2018 and recorded a demo for it, though the album was ultimately shelved. In August 2019, West's then-wife Kim Kardashian posted an image of a track list for Jesus Is King that showed the song slated for release on it. In the image, the Bible was open to Psalm 57:6, a passage that uses the word "Selah". By September 29, 2019, West had re-recorded certain lyrics for the song. It later leaked online on October 13 of that year after being played at 2019 listening sessions for the album in Detroit, Chicago and New York, with the leak being different from the version of the song played at the listening sessions. In response to the song and other tracks by GOOD Music rappers leaking in October 2019, the record label's president Pusha T branded the leaks "cute" but he stated that "if I find out who is leaking it, I will make a decent example out of you...and no one can stop it, no Kanye, nobody!" Def Jam Recordings shared a trailer for Jesus Is King that same month, featuring a preview of the song. Jeffrey LaValley, musical director of the New Jerusalem Choir, received writing credit on "Selah" due to having created and wrote the melody of the group's recording "Revelations 19:1" (1984), which the song samples a rendition of. (Note: "Selah" samples a rendition of the New Jerusalem Choir's "Revelations 19:1" by the Sunday Service Choir.) With the original version having been released back in 1984, West only needed a mechanical license for usage because it could be classified as public domain. He also wrote the song, along with Cyhi the Prynce, Consequence, Federico Vindver, No Malice, BoogzDaBeast, Rennard East, Pusha T, E*vax, Sean Leon, John Boyd, and Adam Wright. (Note: Find additional credits for the song on the BMI Repertoire by searching the work number #40758455.) The title "Selah" is a Hebrew term that appears throughout the Book of Psalms, which West defined as a term meaning "to look back and reflect upon".

== Composition and lyrics ==
"Selah"
A 13−second sample of the song in which West references the John 8:36 verse of the Bible over organ chords and military drums, before the chorus starts. The chorus features samples of gospel vocals from the Sunday Service Choir's rendition of "Revelations 19:1", including repetition of the group's "hallelujah" chants, which have been described as "rapturous".

Musically, "Selah" is a hip hop and gospel track. Instrumentation for the song consists primarily of military drums, which have been noted for conveying attitude. The chord progression of it was compared to that of the track "Gerudo Valley", from the soundtrack of video game The Legend of Zelda: Ocarina of Time (1998). The song features samples of a gospel rendition of the New Jerusalem Choir's "Revelations 19:1", as performed by the Sunday Service Choir. Prior to the song's chorus, organ chords are featured alongside West rapping. The chorus includes repeated "hallelujah" chants from the Sunday Service Choir, which are sampled from the rendition. Percussion and sound effects of metal scraping accompany the chorus, while the octave of the vocals rises. The group being sampled adds gospel vocals to the chorus and as it continues, the instrumentation is silenced. A capella singing from the Sunday Service Choir follows, while the chorus ends with the line "He is wonderful" from the group. After the chorus, West raps in time with the drums coming in.

The lyrics of the song are used by West to assert his faith in Christianity, with it including verses of the Bible being referenced by him. The song is segued into once "Every Hour" cuts out abruptly, opening with West using his faith to boast, "God is king, we the soldiers", alluding to his past and evolution over time. Comparing himself to Noah before the story of the Genesis flood took place, West mentions that he is being judged. West delivers Christian rapping, including him using the lyrics: "Everybody wanted Yandhi/Then Jesus Christ did the laundry." The lyrics indicate that West scrapped Yandhi due to his religious beliefs after going through a new birth experience, since he vowed to no longer create secular music, providing fans with meaning of the album being shelved. West uses certain lyrics to reference John 8:33 and John 8:36. For the conclusion of the song, crys of "Woo" are heard.

== Release and promotion ==
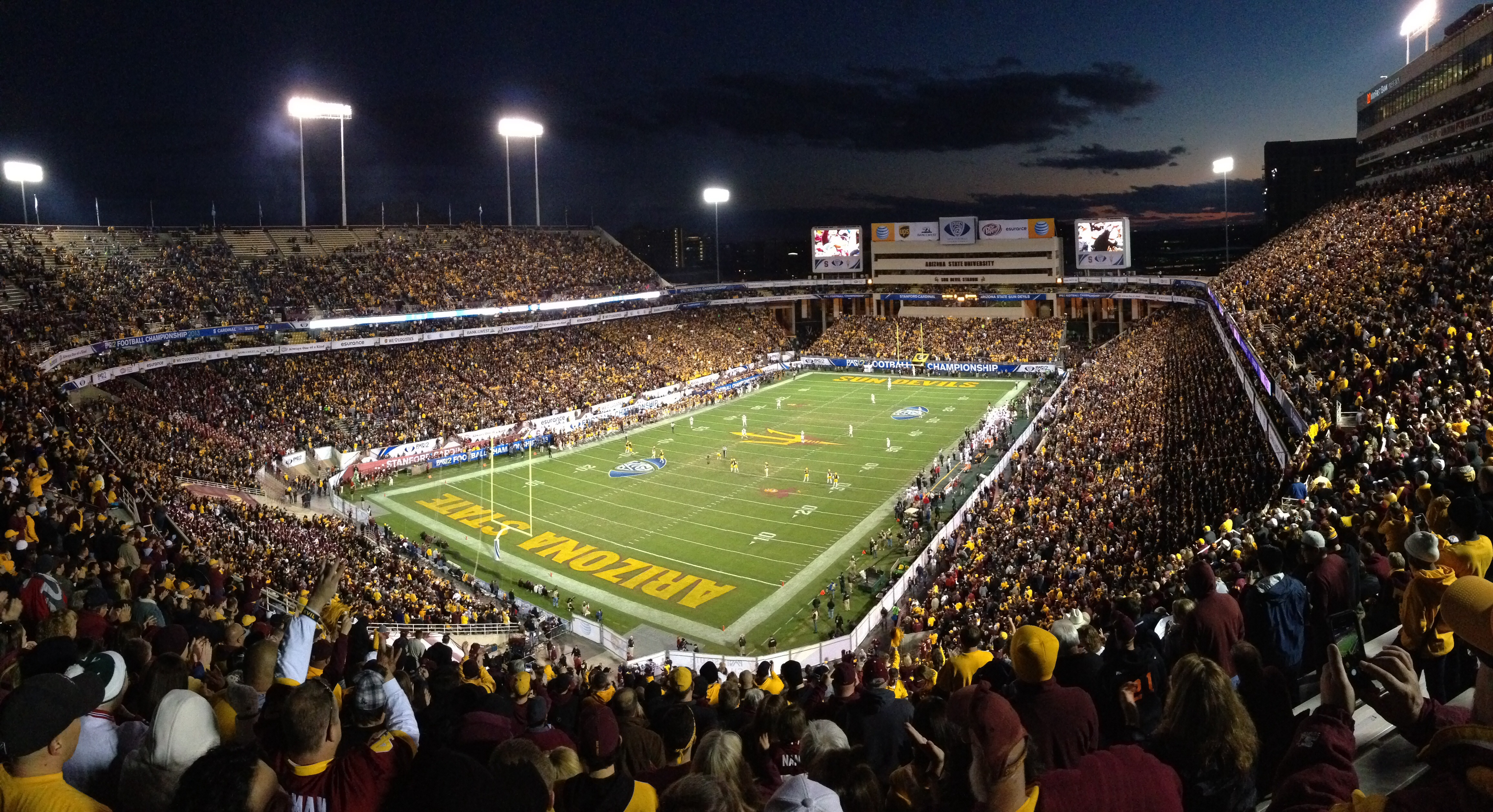
"Selah" stood as the first track of the Sunday Service Choir's set for Awaken 2020 at Sun Devil Stadium where they were joined by West, following the album's preceding number, "Every Hour".

"Selah" was released on October 25, 2019, as the second track on West's ninth studio album Jesus Is King. On September 28, 2019, West played the song twice during a listening party for the album at the Auditorium Theatre in Chicago. Of the song's presence at the listening session, attendee Donald Lawrence recalled that watching "a crowd that was probably 25% African American, 75% caucasian — hip-hop kids from the suburbs — go bananas when the choir came in [was amazing]". The following day, West previewed the song as part of the album's listening party at New York's United Palace.

West and the Sunday Service Choir performed the song live at Bethany Church in Baton Rouge on November 3, 2019. For West's Sunday Service Experience at Joel Osteen's Lakewood Church on November 17 of that year, the song was performed by him and the group. During the performance, the line "He saved a wretch like me" was sung off-key by West. On January 18, 2020, "Selah" was the first track West performed with the Sunday Service Choir for the Christian event Awaken at Sun Devil Stadium in Tempe, Arizona. West made this appearance after "Every Hour" and he blended in by wearing the same white clothing as them, while he faced away from the crowd or disappeared from view altogether when he was not singing. The day after the event, West sang the song with the Sunday Service Choir for his youth Strength to Stand Conference in Pigeon Forge, Tennessee, which was dedicated to Jesus. On January 27, West held a midnight Sunday Service Choir concert in tribute to American basketball player Kobe Bryant after the 2020 Calabasas helicopter crash killed 9 people including Bryant and his daughter. West performed the song live during the concert, with his then-sister-in-law Kourtney Kardashian sharing videos of him performing it to her Instagram Stories.

== Reception ==
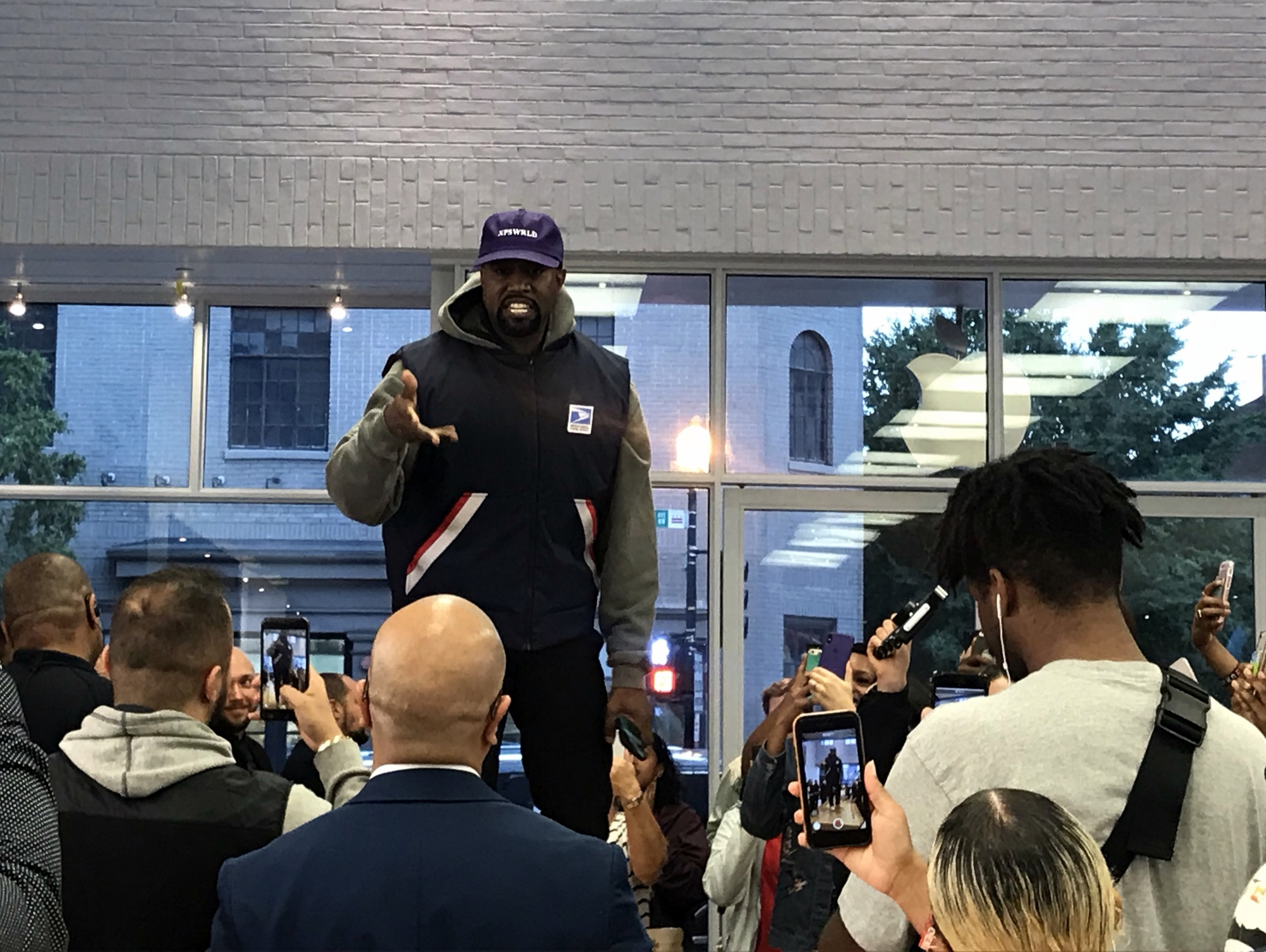
West's lyricism was criticized by a number of critics.

"Selah" was met with generally positive reviews from music critics, with general praise for the composition. Rawiya Kameir of Pitchfork noted "the battle drums that propel" the song for echoing "the stark, confrontational attitude of" West's sixth studio album Yeezus (2013). Entertainment Weekly's Brian Josephs praised the song for the Sunday Service Choir going "to awe in the climax". Jordan Bassett from NME commented that the song features "dour organ" and "intermittent percussion". Sam C. Mac of Slant Magazine viewed the Sunday Service Choir as "on hand" for elevating the song, specifically with a "hallelujah" chant "that's augmented by dynamic leaps in octave and by Ye's colossal bursts of percussive, scraping-metal sound effects". Will Rosebury from Clash admitted that hearing West rap the lyrics, "Keeping perfect composure/When I scream at the chauffeur/I ain't mean I'm just focused" would mean the fans "fearing an ultra-positive Kanye will breathe a sigh of relief", while Rosebury questioned "who the fuck wants a reined-in Kanye West?" In a review for American Songwriter, Luke Levenson stated the song is where "West punctuates his bars with bible verses several times", which he called "punchy moments" that are "weighed down by the effeteness" of certain lyrics. Levenson elaborated, describing West as delivering the lyrics "with an exerted vocal effect, tensing up his throat as the track drives beneath his voice" and concluded by writing that this "amounts to heavy stuff", though is "less gripping" than West's previous works related to God. The New York Times critic Jon Caramanica opined that the song "swells until West cites Bible verses over door-slam percussion, suggesting an explosion of religious awakening", while noting his rapping sometimes being "tart".

In a mixed review, Brendan Klinkenberg of Rolling Stone complemented the song's composition for "lightly affected organs opening to bludgeoning percussion and a crescendoing choir" but criticized West's rapping due to being what "capsizes the vessel" and slammed his lyricism. For The Atlantic, Spencer Kornhaber said that the album's excitement "comes to a thud" when West begins rapping on the song, criticizing his lyricism despite directing praise towards the song's drums and the addition of the Sunday Service Choir for the chorus. Wren Graves was more negative at Consequence, noting the drums "temporarily impress" and analyzing that the song "creates an expectant atmosphere with moody organs" alongside the Sunday Service Choir "whispering 'Hallelujah'" as West "quotes the Book of John on bondage and slavery", but complained that even though you think it "is going somewhere" due to the Sunday Service Choir getting louder and the tension rising, "poof, nothing happens". Graves expressed further criticism, describing the later part of the song as where West "returns with a meandering verse about greed, betrayal, forgiveness, and truth, saying nothing as he tries to cover everything", concluding that there is "no central idea, no point". Ross Horton from The Line of Best Fit listed the song among the parts of Jesus Is King "not worth saving", branding it as "a bunch of Bible verses interspersed with barbed, growled snatches of vocal". In The Guardian, Dean Van Nguyen called the song's lyrical content "as thin as Bible paper".

"Selah" received a nomination for Top Gospel Song at the 2020 Billboard Music Awards, though ultimately lost the award to fellow album track "Follow God". At the 2021 ASCAP Rhythm & Soul Awards, the former was awarded as one of the Winning Gospel Songs.

== Commercial performance ==
Following the release of Jesus Is King, "Selah" debuted on the US Billboard Hot 100 at number 19. The track remained on the Hot 100 for two weeks. It entered at number three on the US Christian Songs chart, alongside charting identically on the Gospel Songs chart. On the US Hot R&B/Hip-Hop Songs chart, the track reached number 10. "Selah" was certified gold by the Recording Industry Association of America (RIAA) for amassing 500,000 certified units in the United States on July 9, 2021.

The track entered the Canadian Hot 100 at number 19, charting identically to its debut on the Billboard Hot 100. Similarly, "Selah" reached number 18 on the ARIA Singles Chart, standing as the album's second highest charting track in Australia. The track was less successful on the New Zealand Singles Chart, debuting at number 24. It charted identically on the Latvian Singles Chart and UK Singles Chart, peaking at number 19 on both of the charts. Top 30 positions were attained by the track in Iceland, Ireland, Denmark, and Estonia. In Slovakia, the track experienced lesser performance, peaking at number 31 on the country's Singles Digitál Top 100 chart. It also reached the top 50 in Switzerland, Lithuania and Portugal.

== Appearances in media ==
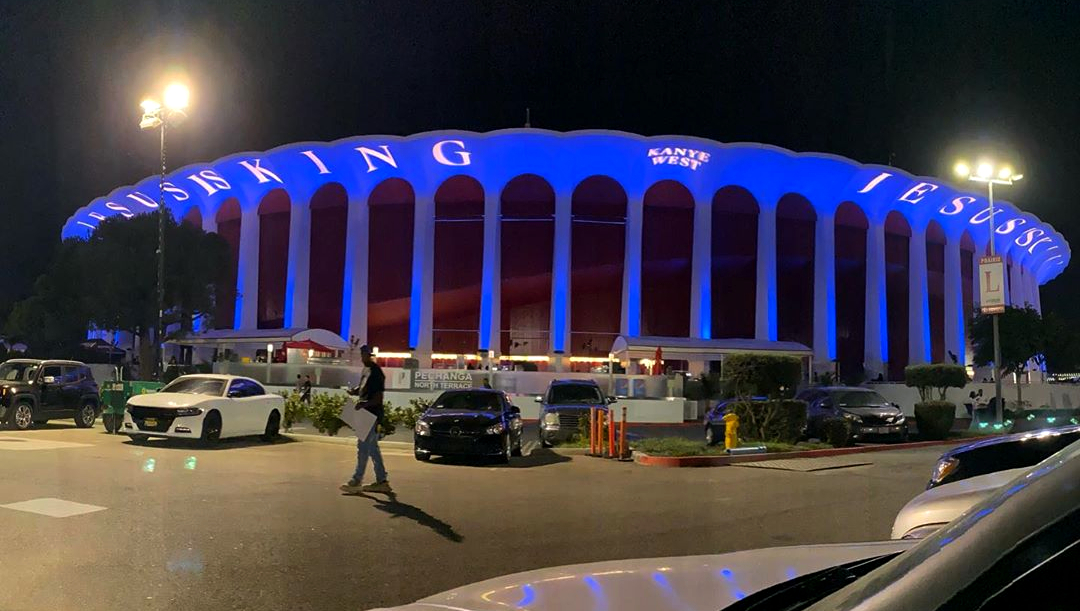
The song was first shown to be part of Jesus Is King during its screening at the Forum and a special mix was included in the film, which was released alongside the album in October 2019.

West screened his concert film Jesus Is King at the Forum in the County of Los Angeles on October 23, 2019, revealing "Selah" as part of the soundtrack. Two days later, Jesus Is King was released simultaneously with the album of the same name, including a special mix of the song that is listed in the film's credits. American musician Louie Zong shared an edit of "Selah" that combined it with "Gerudo Valley" on the same day, which was met with generally positive responses from fans of West. On November 14, 2019, LaValley recalled his niece calling him from Phoenix and "saying congratulations", with LaValley questioning in response: "Congratulations? Congratulations for what?" LaValley's niece replied by telling that his "tune is on Kanye's album", with him responding with: "Girl, shut up", and laughing, while being amazed when seeing himself credit as a writer on the song. According to LaValley, the song's popularity brought more attention to the New Jerusalem Choir version, which he labeled "an honor". When questioned about West possibly performing the song in LaValley's hometown of Flint he acknowledged that an appearance from West "would be controversial", despite stating: "I don't know. I'd love for him to. I'd love to see him come to Flint."

Kim Kardashian shared a video of her and Kanye's daughter Chicago West singing the "hallelujah" part of "Selah" via Instagram on January 28, 2020. Kardashian captioned the video "Chi's favorite songs 🙏🏼✨" and fans praised Chicago's singing skills, while Kanye later stated that it is their daughter's favorite song. On February 2, 2020, the Super Bowl LIV trailer for the tenth Fast & Furious franchise film F9 (2021) was released and included the song. The song was later used in another trailer that premiered at the Super Bowl LV in February 2021. In September 2023, West's remix album Jesus Is King Part II with record producer and fellow rapper Dr. Dre leaked online, featuring an intro that mixes and combines "Selah" with "Every Hour".

== Sunday Service Choir version ==
"Revelations 19:1"

Song by Sunday Service Choir

from the album Jesus Is Born
- Released: December 25, 2019
- Recorded: 2019
- Genre: Gospel
- Length: 5:33
- Label: INC
- Composers: Jason White; Nikki Grier; Stephen A. Hurd; Steve Epting

A rendition of the track "Revelations 19:1" by the New Jerusalem Baptist Church Choir was recorded by the Sunday Service Choir, and the rendition is sampled within "Selah". The Sunday Service Choir version of "Revelations 19:1" was released on December 25, 2019, as the third track on the group's debut studio album Jesus Is Born. However, this was two months after the release of "Selah" on Jesus Is King, meaning that the rendition had been sampled prior to release. In January 2019, former West Angeles Church of God in Christ music director Jason White received a call from Ray Romulus of the Stereotypes telling him that Kanye West wanted a choir, requesting 100 people for it and to put together a band. Despite being "a little scared" of getting involved with any of West's controversies, White said that he "could see something different about this guy" on the night of first meeting West in rehearsal and he has since served as the Sunday Service Choir's director. White solely arranged the rendition, while he also composed it alongside Nikki Grier, Stephen A. Hurd and Steve Epting.

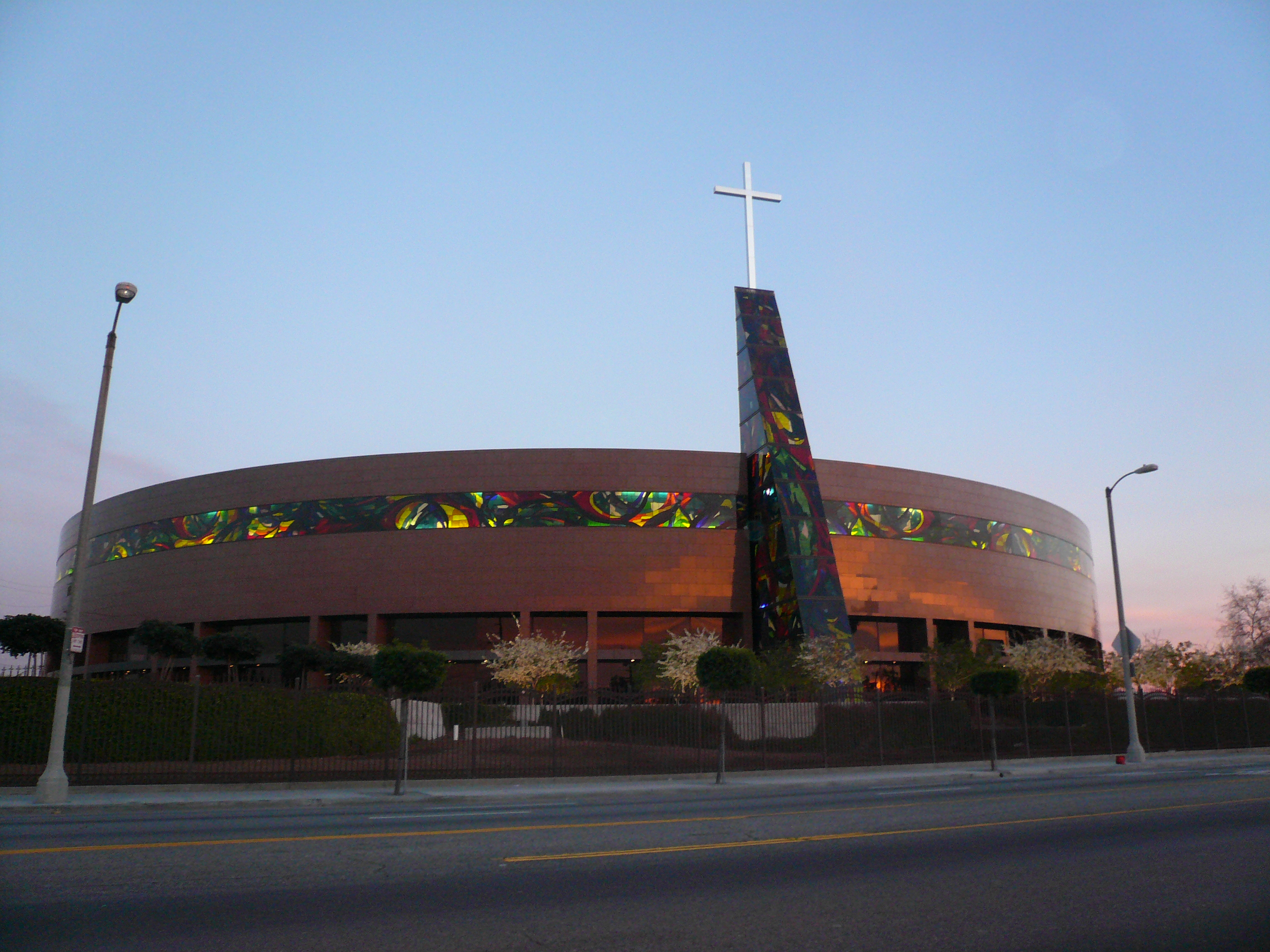
West Angeles Church of God in Christ, whose director Jason White arranged the rendition after appreciating West during rehearsals in spite of his controversies.

"Revelations 19:1" is a gospel track, which features the Sunday Service Choir singing for over five minutes. Its chorus sees the group deliver praise for Christ, including them singing "hallelujah" repeatedly. The rendition reached number 17 on the US Billboard Gospel Songs chart for the issue date of January 11, 2020. It has been regularly performed live by the Sunday Service Choir on a weekly basis.

=== Credits and personnel ===
Credits adapted from Tidal.

- Jason White – arranger, composer
- Nikki Grier – composer
- Stephen A. Hurd – composer
- Steve Epting – composer

A. Jeffrey LaValley—composer of Revelation 19:1

== Credits and personnel ==
Credits for "Selah" adapted from Tidal and the BMI Repertoire.

- Kanye West – production, songwriter
- E*vax – production, songwriter
- BoogzDaBeast – co-production, songwriter
- Federico Vindver – co-production, songwriter
- Benny Blanco – additional production
- Francis Starlite – additional production
- Cyhi the Prynce – songwriter
- Consequence – songwriter
- No Malice – songwriter
- Jeffrey LaValley – songwriter
- Rennard East – songwriter
- Pusha T – songwriter
- Sean Leon – songwriter
- John Boyd – songwriter
- Adam Wright – songwriter
- Anthony Clemons – additional vocals
- BongoByTheWay – additional vocals
- Sunday Service Choir – additional vocals
- Mike Dean – mastering engineer, mixer
- Jess Jackson – mixer
- Andrew Drucker – recording engineer
- Jamie Peters – recording engineer
- Jesse Ray Emster – recording engineer
- Josh Bales – recording engineer
- Josh Berg – recording engineer
- Randy Urbanski – recording engineer
- Shane Fitzgibbon – recording engineer
- Steven Felix – recording engineer
- Zack Djurich – recording engineer

== Charts ==
=== Weekly charts ===
Chart performance for "Selah"
Chart (2019)	Peak position
Australia (ARIA)	18
Canada Hot 100 (Billboard)	19
Czech Republic Singles Digital (ČNS IFPI)	75
Denmark (Tracklisten)	25
Estonia (Eesti Tipp-40)	30
France (SNEP)	79
Greece International Digital Singles (IFPI)	77
Iceland (Tónlistinn)	21
Ireland (IRMA)	21
Italy (FIMI)	99
Latvia (LAIPA)	19
Lithuania (AGATA)	36
Netherlands (Single Top 100)	91
New Zealand (Recorded Music NZ)	24
Portugal (AFP)	46
Slovakia Singles Digital (ČNS IFPI)	31
Sweden (Sverigetopplistan)	65
Switzerland (Schweizer Hitparade)	35
UK Singles (Official Charts)	19
UK Hip Hop/R&B (Official Charts)	12
US Billboard Hot 100	19
US Hot Christian Songs (Billboard)	3
US Gospel Songs (Billboard)	3
US Hot R&B/Hip-Hop Songs (Billboard)	10
US Rolling Stone Top 100	4

Chart performance for "Revelations 19:1"
Chart (2020)	Peak position
US Gospel Songs (Billboard)	17

=== Year-end charts ===
2019 year-end chart performance for "Selah"
Chart (2019)	Position
US Christian Songs (Billboard)	41
US Gospel Songs (Billboard)	6

2020 year-end chart performance for "Selah"
Chart (2020)	Position
US Christian Songs (Billboard)	49
US Gospel Songs (Billboard)	5

== Certifications ==
Certifications and sales for "Selah"
Region	Certification	Certified units/sales
United States (RIAA)	Gold	500,000^{‡}
^{‡} Sales+streaming figures based on certification alone.

== See also ==
- Every Hour
