= DēP =

American singer

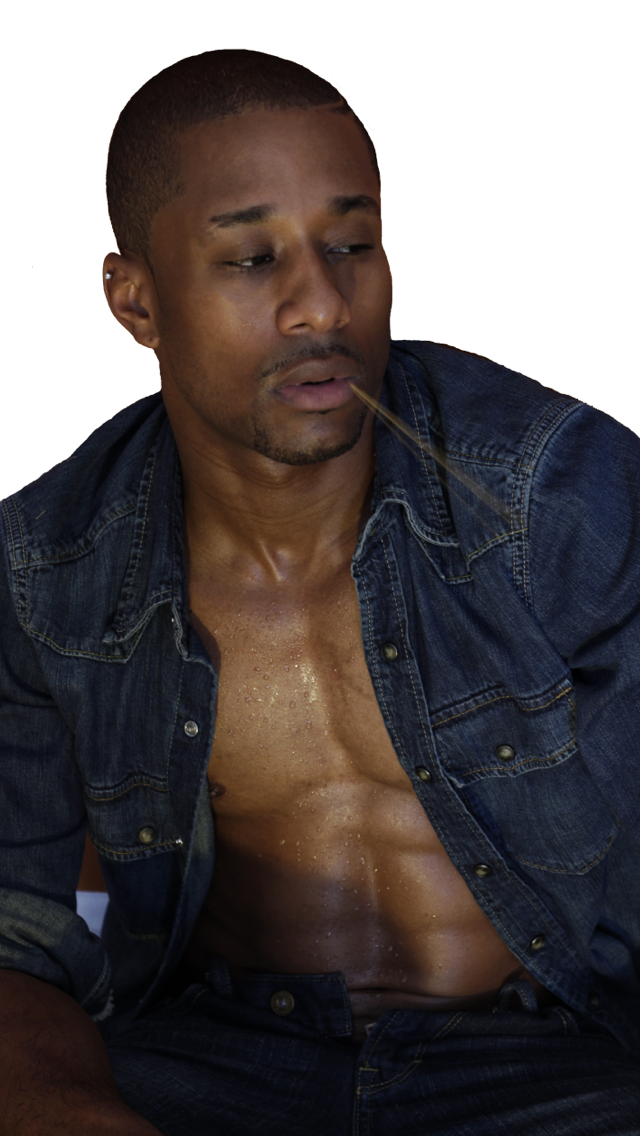

Background information
- Born: Donald Paige Houston, Texas, U.S.
- Origin: Brooklyn, New York, U.S.
- Genre: R&B
- Occupation: Singer Actor Producer Model
- Years active: 2005–present
- Label: Think DeP Entertainment
- Website: thinkdep.com

Donald Paige, known professionally as DēP (pronounced Deep), is an American R&B singer. He released his debut single "For Me" in 2005.

== Early life ==
DēP was born and raised in Houston, Texas, into a musical family with roots in gospel music. Growing up within the confines of the Outreach Missionary Baptist church, he started singing gospel music at the age of six. DēP's first acting opportunity consisted of roles in a Six Flags commercial. He attended performing arts schools starting from elementary through High School for the Performing and Visual Arts in Houston, focusing in vocal and piano. He also was a part of the young performers at The Ensemble Theatre with fellow members Solange Knowles, Miss Mykie, and others. He also studied piano at A All About Music. After performing secular music in High School, he transferred to Westbury High School during his second year, desiring to become a professional performing artist. Shortly after enrolling at Texas College, where he joined the Beta Beta chapter of the Kappa Alpha Psi fraternity in Spring 2001, DeP was offered a record deal with Versatile Records in Washington D.C.

== Career ==
=== Early career ===
During his time at Texas College in Tyler TX. DeP was signed to Versatile Records in Washington D.C. where he first began releasing his own music, which resulted in his first national release, his EP entitled "For Me". After leaving Versatile Records, DeP joined New York City based male R&B group, Diehard in the mid-2000s. Diehard changed their name to Signature shortly after he joined. The group was signed to Blackball Records and then bought out by Elite Records who got them their debut performance of their single "Get It In" on BET's video countdown show, 106 & Park. After a few years, DeP left the group and took a break from entertainment to complete his degree in education.

DēP relocated to Los Angeles, and has appeared in commercials for companies including Beats by Dre and Dos Equis.

=== 2005–2013 ===
DēP released his first EP, For Me in 2005.

In 2008, he released his debut single titled "Something More" which was a slow groove R&B ballad, the single was co-produced by Lejuan Samuels.

In 2008 DēP released his second EP, The Truth, with MMG Record Label which included the hit, "Something More.

In 2010 DēPlaunched a marketing company, Think DeP Entertainment. His second EP, The Truth was also released same year on MMG.

He collaborated with Don Benjamin and released his second single "Sugar Rush" in 2012. DēP's third single was "Contract" which was also released in 2012.

In 2013, DēP was featured as a doo-wop singer, in the commercial series featuring Dos Equis. The commercial was produced by Radical Media and directed by Steve Miller.

In 2013, he released his fourth single "Celebrate" which was produced by Davion Botts.

=== 2014–2017 ===
DēP was hired by producer, Bill Brummel, to voice the role of Lawerence Huggins for the documentary, Selma: The Bridge To The Ballot. The documentary that tells the story of a courageous group of students and teachers who, along with other activists, fought a nonviolent battle to win voting rights for African-Americans in the South, would be DeP's first voice over role. It has since become a tool for middle school and high school classrooms across the US.

DēP also landed a placement of an original song produced by Theo Gearring, "1st Sight", in the 2015 romantic comedy, My Favorite Five.

In 2016 DēP released his first album, Think DēP Reloaded. The LP included all of his previously released singles and some new songs including the single "Red Light".

In 2017, DēP became more present with his company Think DeP Entertainment in working as creative director with several "Next Up" artist including TeaMarrr, the first artist signed to Issa Rae record label Raedio and other newcomers.

=== 2018–2019 ===
Throughout 2018, DeP worked with several aspiring artists, releasing EPs and singles for some of them which featured him as a writer, co-producer, A&R and performer, including his features on Bianca Acosta's Christmas single "Ode To Mary" and Jai G's, "Edna Jean".

In 2018, DēP landed his first lead role for a short film called This Side Up, a true story about Henry Brown's infamous escape from slavery by mailing himself to freedom . He has also appeared in cameos in several TV shows including Will & Grace and The Rookie.

DēP was named one of 2019 Top 50 Black Professionals & Entrepreneurs of Texas awarded by D Mars Magazine, and recognized by the US Congress for his work in helping develop young talent and entrepreneurship.

The Tom Joyner Foundation launched a podcast in 2019, HBCUbiquity, that spotlights HBCU's and the lifestyle around them. Calling upon DeP to write and perform the podcast opening song for the opening of the podcast.

In 2019, DēP joined Kanye West' Sunday service collective as one of its early members.

=== 2020–2025 ===
In 2020, DēP was asked to be a part of performances with John Legend, including the BET Awards performance and the two day performance at the first virtual Democratic National Convention. DēP has provided background vocals for Beyonce to honor the loss of Los Angeles basketball player, Kobe Bryant. He also stage managed the 50th anniversary for the Southeast Inspirational Choir. The concert featured the choir, Yolanda Adams, of which he directed her hit song with the choir "You Made The Difference", Donald Lawrence, Kim Burell, Kathy Taylor and The Walls Group. On September 4, to commemorate his 38th birthday, DēP partnered with Nathaniel Kemp of Digital Frog Photography, and released a limited edition photo collection, 'X-pression 38'. The collection has 38 limited edition photos from a two-year shoot that the duo collaborated on to be a part of a 2022 project entitled Rebirth.

In June 2022, in honor of Juneteenth, DēP published his first book 'Fallback To Step Up'.

In 2023, DēP released his second mixtape "This Shit Can't Wait".

In 2023 DēP released the R&B single "Same Difference" Featuring Grammy Award winning artist, Susan Carol

In June 2025, DēP released his first full concept album, Birthright.

=== 2026 – Present ===
DēP is currently touring his Birthright album. He has have several notable shows in London, Houston, Vegas,and Los Angeles. He is also preparing to release "Rebirth" a special edition of his album "Birthright.

His upcoming LP, Edibles and Elevation, is slated for release in 2027.

== Discography ==
=== Singles ===
- "For Me" (2005)
- "Something More" (2008)
- "Contract" (2012)
- "Celebrate" (2013)
- "Red Light" (2016)
- "Red Light Pt. II" (2016)
- "Ode To Mary" Bianca Acosta Ft. DeP (2018)
- "Fallback" (2019)
- "Bi In" (2023)
- "Same Difference" (2023)
- "Hoods Off" (2023)
- "Soldier's Revival" (2025)
- "Farewell Dixie" (2025)

=== Albums ===
- For Me EP (2005)
- The Truth (2008)
- Think DeP Reloaded (2016)
- The Gift: Lion King "SPIRIT" (2019)
- Jesus is King (2019)
- Jesus is Born (2019)
- This Shit Can't Wait Mixtape (2023)
- Birthright Mixtape (2025)
- Edibles and Elevation (pending)

== Filmography ==
Year	Film	Role	Notes
2023	Bora	Music Dept "Same Difference"	Featured Film
2020	Black Is King	Choir	Featured Film
2020	Will & Grace	Tourist	Supporting Cast
2019	Lion King	Singer "Spirit"	Featured Film
2019	Jesus Is King	SELF	Short
2019	This Side Up: The True Story of Henry Brown	Henry Brown	Short
2018	The Choir Director	Choir Member Male Lead	Supporting Cast
2017	Kings	Rioter	Supporting Cast
2017	The Preacher's Son	Choir Member Male Lead	Supporting Cast
2015	Straight Outta Compton	DJ Hype Man	Supporting Cast
2015	My Favorite Five	Singer "1st Sight"	Music Department
2015	Selma: The Bridge To The Ballot	Lawrence Huggins (Voice)	Short
2014	Rake	Party Guest	TV series – Serial Killer episode
2011	Graceland	Party Boy	Short
2011	We The People With Gloria Allred	Jack Jacobson	TV series – Baby Swab/Flowers From Hell episode
2011	Black Gold	Militant Leader	Supporting Cast
