= Kathy Taylor (musician) =

African American gospel musician and artist (orn 1961)

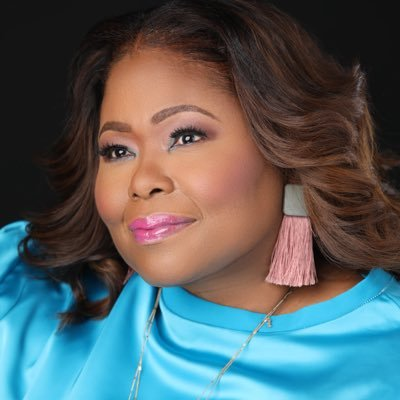

Background information
- Also known as: Kathy Taylor-Brown
- Born: Kathy Yvonne Taylor; May 6, 1961 (age 65); Houston, Texas
- Genres: Gospel, traditional black gospel
- Occupations: Singer, songwriter
- Instruments: Vocals, singer-songwriter
- Years active: 1999–present
- Labels: Aleho International, Tyscot
- Website: kathytaylorlive.com

Kathy Yvonne Taylor (born May 6, 1961) is an African-American gospel musician and artist. She started her music career, in 1999 as Kathy Taylor-Brown, with the release of Taylormade by Aleho International. This album was her breakthrough on the Billboard magazine charts, which it placed on the Gospel Albums chart. Her second album, Live: The Worship Experience as Kathy Taylor, was released by Tyscot Records in 2009. The album placed on the Gospel Albums along with chartings on The Billboard 200 and Independent Albums charts.

== Early life ==
Taylor was born on May 6, 1961, in Houston, Texas, as Kathy Yvonne Taylor, and her mother is Doris, of whom she was the fourth child.

== Music career ==
Her music career started in 1999, with the release of Taylormade under the name Kathy Taylor-Brown, on November 16, 1999 by Aleho International Music. This album was her breakthrough release on the Billboard magazine charts, placing on the Gospel Albums at No. 22. She released her second album with Tyscot Records on January 27, 2009, Live: The Worship Experience, and this charted on the aforementioned chart at No. 6, along with chartings on the Billboard 200 at No. 190 and Independent Albums chart at No. 22.

== Personal life ==
Taylor was married to Kenneth LaRue Brown, until his death in 2010.

== Discography ==
=== Studio albums ===
List of studio albums, with selected chart positions
Title	Album details	Peak chart positions		
Title	Album details	US	US Gos	US Indie
Taylormade	Released: November 16, 1999; Label: Aleho International; CD, digital download	–	22	–
Live: The Worship Experience	Released: January 27, 2009; Label: Tyscot; CD, digital download	190	6	22
