= Water (Kanye West song) =

2019 song by Kanye West

Song by Kanye West featuring Ant Clemons

from the album Jesus Is King
- Released: October 25, 2019
- Recorded: April 6 – October 24, 2019
- Genre: Psychedelic; gospel
- Length: 2:48
- Label: GOOD; Def Jam
- Songwriters: Kanye West; Alexander Klein; Anthony Clemons; Bruce Haack; Federico Vindver; Jahmal Gwin; Timothy Mosley; Victory Boyd
- Producers: Kanye West; BoogzDaBeast

"Water" is a song by American vocalist and record producer Kanye West from his ninth studio album, Jesus Is King (2019). The song features a guest appearance by American singer Ant Clemons and additional vocals from gospel group the Sunday Service Choir. It was produced by West and BoogzDaBeast, while co-produced by Angel Lopez, Federico Vindver and Timbaland. The song came from a conversation between Clemons and West about Jesus. A psychedelic and gospel track, the song includes samples of "Blow Job", performed by Bruce Haack. It also interpolates "We're All Water", performed by Yoko Ono. The imagery of the lyrics represents the renewal of Baptism and West prays to Jesus in his verse. On April 16, 2019, the song was recorded and it was announced for release that same month.

Ultimately released as the seventh track on Jesus Is King in October 2019, "Water" received polarized reviews from music critics. They were generally divided in their feelings towards the vocals, with particular attention being drawn towards West's performance. Other critics expressed somewhat mixed assessments of the production, despite it being debated by them whether or not the song stands among the album's highlights. The song charted at number 37 on both the ARIA Singles Chart and Icelandic Singles Chart in 2019. On the US Billboard Hot 100, it debuted at number 51 and stood as one of Clemons' first two appearances on the chart. The song was performed live by West, Clemons and Ty Dolla Sign at the Coachella Festival on Easter 2019. The performance received positive reviews from critics, who praised West's involvement. West recorded a new verse of the song for him and Dr. Dre's collaborative remix album, Jesus Is King Part II.

== Background and recording ==
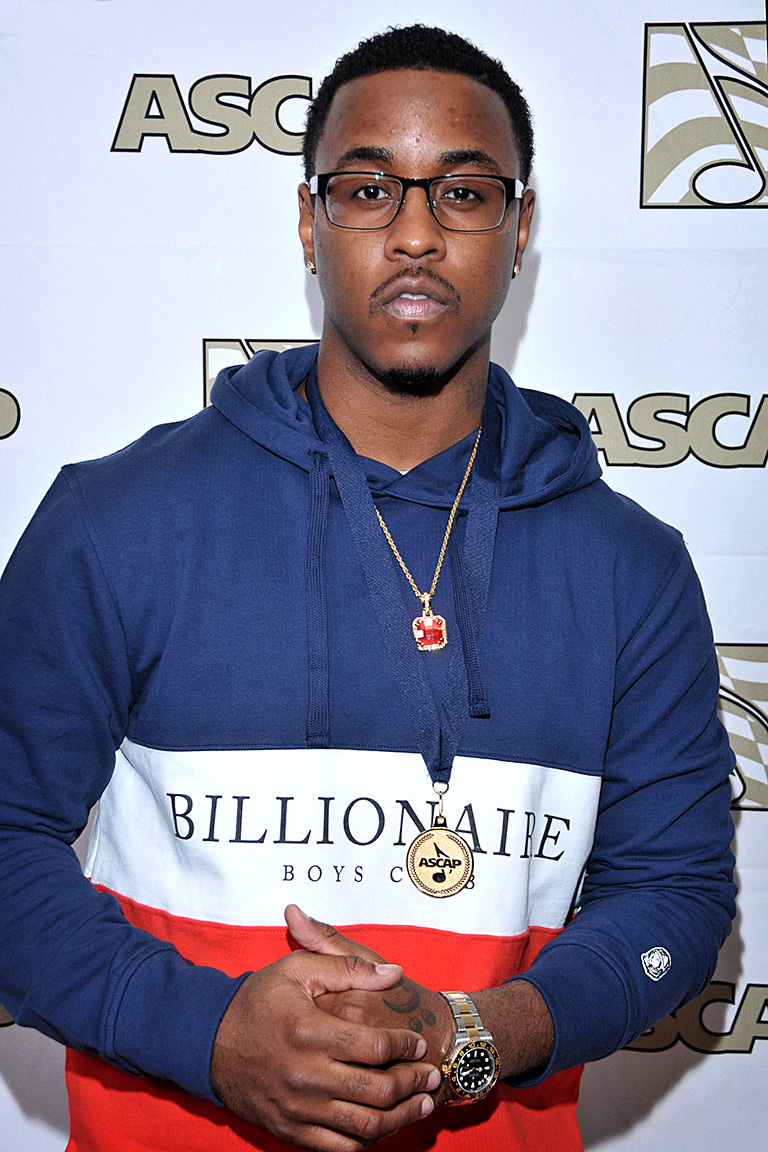
Ant Clemons became connected with West from having collaborated with Jeremih (pictured).

West and BoogzDaBeast produced "Water", with co-production from Angel Lopez, Federico Vindver and Timbaland. BoogzDaBeast is one of the more unknown producers who worked on Jesus Is King and he received credit on six of the tracks. West previously worked with him on the 2018 self-titled debut studio album by Kids See Ghosts, a hip hop duo composed of the former and Kid Cudi. Kano Computing CEO Alex Klein, credited as Alexander Nelson Klein, helped write the song. Klein first met West at the 2019 Consumer Electronics Show, which was followed by them continuing to work together throughout the year and the song was a bigger musical project than anything Klein had been involved with in the past. He recalled "a lot of typing, a lot of listening, and a lot of people throwing out different ideas" from being in the studio with West during a phone call with Complex, praising him as a group collaborator and leader.

Alongside the song, Ant Clemons is featured on Jesus Is King track "Everything We Need", and was involved in the creation of "Selah". Clemons collaborated with fellow singer Jeremih in the late 2010s, which led to him forming a connection with West. Vocals were contributed by Clemons to West's single "All Mine", from his eighth studio album Ye (2018), and Clemons explained going from recording the single to "Water" in an interview with Complex by stating that "progression just happens naturally as people." Clemons explained that the track was based on a conversation about Jesus he had with West, which included West expressing feelings that "we should be fluid as water [sic]" and coming up with lines for the track, with Clemons admitting lots "of the best songs come from conversations." According to Clemons, the track was recorded five days prior to West and the Sunday Service Choir's appearance at the Coachella Festival on April 21, 2019. Clemons recalled BoogzDaBeast presenting a "phenomenal instrumental that sounds like the Seventies" during recording.

West debuted the track with a performance at Coachella in April 2019, marking the first time that a song had been debuted during one of his Sunday Service concerts. Before the performance, West announced "Water" as a new track and revealed the title. However, he did not provide further details about the track at the time and it had a possibility of being featured on West's then-upcoming album Yandhi. The track was first revealed to be slated for release on Jesus Is King as the ninth track when West's wife Kim Kardashian shared a potential track list for it in August 2019. (Note: Yandhi was ultimately scrapped and replaced with Jesus Is King.) "Water" was one of the three tracks that ultimately caused the release of the album in October of that year to be delayed due to mixing modifications.

== Composition and lyrics ==
Musically, "Water" is a psychedelic and gospel track. A bassline is featured, which has been described as "bouncy". The song contains samples of the recording "Blow Job", written and performed by Bruce Haack. It includes an interpolation of "We're All Water", written by Yoko Ono, and performed by Ono. West's vocals have been classified as hoarse.

Imagery is demonstrated within the song's lyrics, representing the Christian sacrament of baptism being renewed and it is the baptismal centerpiece of Jesus Is King. The representation of baptism is connected to the theme of purification that is present within the song. The chorus is performed by Clemons alongside the Sunday Service Choir and references liquid water, with it including him singing "take the chlorine out our conversation". The lyrics also recall a passage from the Book of Jeremiah that sees God refer to himself as "the fountain of living waters". West's verse sees him delivering prayers to Jesus, with it including him begging Jesus to "clean the music".

== Release and promotion ==
During West and the Sunday Service Choir's Easter 2019 appearance at the Coachella Festival, he delivered a performance of the song with Clemons and Ty Dolla Sign, which was positively received by critics.

"Water" was released on October 25, 2019, as the seventh track on West's ninth studio album Jesus Is King, switching position from its originally slated release as the ninth track. The song was performed by West at Coachella on April 21, 2019, coinciding with Easter that year. When transitioning from a gospel rendition of his single "All Falls Down" (2004), West introduced "Water" before beginning his performance of it. Simultaneously, Def Jam tweeted "New Song" in response. Before West performed the song, he had spent the majority of his joint appearance at Coachella with the Sunday Service Choir watching the group performing. West was joined by Clemons and American musician Ty Dolla Sign for his performance of the song, atop a hillside campsite known as "The Mountain". The performance was live streamed on YouTube through the vantage point of a peephole, with the camera recording close-up shots that followed a trail of water bottles. Writing for Black America Web, Aliya Faust viewed it as "the perfect addition to Easter Sunday" and praised West's rapping. Pitchfork writer Sheldon Pearce opined that anyone who was "willing to endure" West and the Sunday Service Choir's two-hour show at Coachella "were rewarded" with him and Clemons contributing to the performance of "Water". Following the performance, Hardeep Phull from Billboard noted the song for being "minimal and ghostly-sounding", though said that it "feels unfinished, but is clearly steeped in the gospel tradition that Sunday Service is embodying". Of his appearance at Coachella, Clemons labeled being stood "next to the Kanye West, on a mountain, singing about God" as "a dream come true". He continued, recalling 50,000 people being in attendance and stating that the performance "was the greatest thing that's ever happened".

On September 27, 2019, West previewed the song at a listening party for Jesus Is King in Detroit. It was later played by him during a listening party for the album at The Forum in Los Angeles on October 23 of that year. On October 27, 2019, Belgian drum and bass producer Netsky shared a snippet of his remix of "Water". Netsky ultimately shared a Dropbox link to his bootleg of the song on January 15, 2020. However, the link was only made available for 24 hours. In September 2023, West's remix album Jesus Is King Part II with record producer and fellow rapper Dr. Dre leaked online, including a strengthened version of "Water" with a new verse from the former.

== Critical reception ==
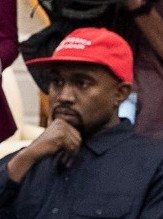
Critical response to the vocals was often focused around those of West.

The song was met with polarized reviews from music critics, who expressed mixed opinions mostly of the vocals. In a highly positive review, Matthew Progress of NOW Magazine viewed the content of it as being among "some of the most captivating melodies ever found on a West project" and said that the song continues the album's "vein of R&B-leaning, wavy church ballads" that begins with the vocals on "Everything We Need". Aaron McKrell from HipHopDX noted the song for seeing West "praying for blessings", linking it to West's "passion for and love for God". For NME, Jordan Bassett named the song as the second best track on Jesus Is King, praising "the sense of community in the backing vocals", as well as the optimism shown within the lyrics, and "the unshowy production". NPR's Oliver Wang questioned the possibility of it being the best track, complementing "the crooning of Ant Clemons" and the Sunday Service Choir's vocals, though Wang concluded by writing that the song "sounds like a glorious, end-of-night dance track, just without drums". In a mixed review, Paste's Steven Edelstone noted that the song is still "at least allowed the space to explore a few ideas" despite being short in length, while citing it as one of the album's highlights but criticizing the production.

Rawiya Kameir of Pitchfork complained that the "raspy pleading" of West on the song "recalls the era of loosies", which he cited as including West releasing the singles "Only One" (2014) and "FourFiveSeconds" (2015). Kameir continued, writing that the bassline of "Water" is one of the best that she's heard in a long time, but "feels like a consolation, not a highlight". In Rolling Stone, Brendan Klinkenberg described West's singing that makes it "clear how urgent this album is for him" as being undercut by his meandering on the song. For RapReviews, Ryan Feyre criticized West's "under-baked verse" and called him annoying. Wren Graves from Consequence expressed heavily negative feelings, stating that the song "is more bland than its namesake".

== Commercial performance ==
Following the release of Jesus Is King, "Water" entered the US Billboard Hot 100 at number 51. By doing so, the track became one of Clemons' first two appearances on the chart, simultaneously with "Everything We Need". The track also entered at number eight and nine on the US Christian Songs and Gospel Songs charts, respectively. At the same time, it debuted at number 25 on the US Billboard Hot R&B/Hip-Hop Songs chart.

The song charted identically on the ARIA Singles Chart and Icelandic Singles Chart, debuting at number 37 on both of them. It was less successful on the Lithuania Top 100, entering at number 54 on the chart. Similarly, the song charted at number 56 on the Canadian Hot 100. "Water" also reached the top 100 in Slovakia and Portugal.

== Credits and personnel ==
Credits adapted from Tidal.

- Kanye West – producer, songwriter
- BoogzDaBeast – producer, songwriter
- Angel Lopez – co-producer, songwriter
- Federico Vindver – co-producer, songwriter
- Timbaland – co-producer, songwriter
- Alexander Nelson Klein – songwriter
- Anthony Clemons – songwriter, additional vocals, featured artist
- Bruce Haack – songwriter
- Victory Elyse Boyd – songwriter
- Sunday Service Choir – additional vocals
- Mike Dean – mastering engineer, mixer
- Jess Jackson – mixer
- Andrew Drucker – recording engineer
- Jamie Peters – recording engineer
- Josh Bales – recording engineer
- Josh Berg – recording engineer
- Randy Urbanski – recording engineer
- Shane Fitzgibbon – recording engineer

== Charts ==
=== Weekly charts ===
Chart performance for "Water"
Chart (2019)	Peak position
Australia (ARIA)	37
Canada Hot 100 (Billboard)	56
France (SNEP)	155
Iceland (Tónlistinn)	37
Lithuania (AGATA)	54
Portugal (AFP)	69
Slovakia Singles Digital (ČNS IFPI)	68
UK Hip Hop/R&B (Official Charts)	25
US Billboard Hot 100	51
US Hot Christian Songs (Billboard)	8
US Gospel Songs (Billboard)	9
US Hot R&B/Hip-Hop Songs (Billboard)	25
US Rolling Stone Top 100	15

=== Year-end charts ===
2019 year-end chart performance for "Water"
Chart (2019)	Position
US Christian Songs (Billboard)	59
US Gospel Songs (Billboard)	18

2020 year-end chart performance for "Water"
Chart (2020)	Position
US Christian Songs (Billboard)	69
US Gospel Songs (Billboard)	15
