= Everything We Need =

Song by Kanye West

Song by Kanye West featuring Ty Dolla Sign and Ant Clemons

from the album Jesus Is King
- Released: October 25, 2019
- Recorded: 2018–19
- Genre: Gospel; R&B; Trap
- Length: 1:56
- Label: GOOD; Def Jam
- Songwriters: Kanye West; Tyrone Griffin Jr.; Anthony Clemons; Michael Mulé; Isaac DeBoni; Ronald Spence, Jr.; Jahmal Gwin; Federico Vindver; Mike Dean; Bradford Lewis; Cydel Young; Josh Berg; Gerard A. Powell
- Producers: Kanye West; FnZ; Ronny J

"Everything We Need" is a song by American rapper Kanye West from his ninth studio album, Jesus Is King (2019). The song features guest appearances from American singers Ty Dolla Sign and Ant Clemons, and additional vocals by the Sunday Service Choir. It was come up with during a freestyle session in the fall of 2018, inspired by a conversation West had with Clemons about Jesus and religion. The song was recorded as a new version of the leaked track "The Storm".

A gospel and R&B ballad with trap elements, "Everything We Need" is reliant on a sparse arrangement. Lyrically, it is themed around being ready for meeting any hardship and need after a religious rebirth. The song received lukewarm reviews from music critics, who mostly complimented the vocals of Ty Dolla Sign and Clemons. Some highlighted the song structure, though critics were generally split towards West's verses.

"Everything We Need" reached number 33 on the US Billboard Hot 100, becoming one of Clemons' first two appearances on the chart. It peaked within the top 50 in 10 other countries, including Australia and Iceland. The song was certified gold in the United States by the Recording Industry Association of America (RIAA), giving West his record-setting 85th single to attain this certification. On Easter 2019, it was performed by the Sunday Service Choir at the Coachella Festival. The group performs the song in West's film Jesus Is King, which accompanied the album.

== Background and recording ==
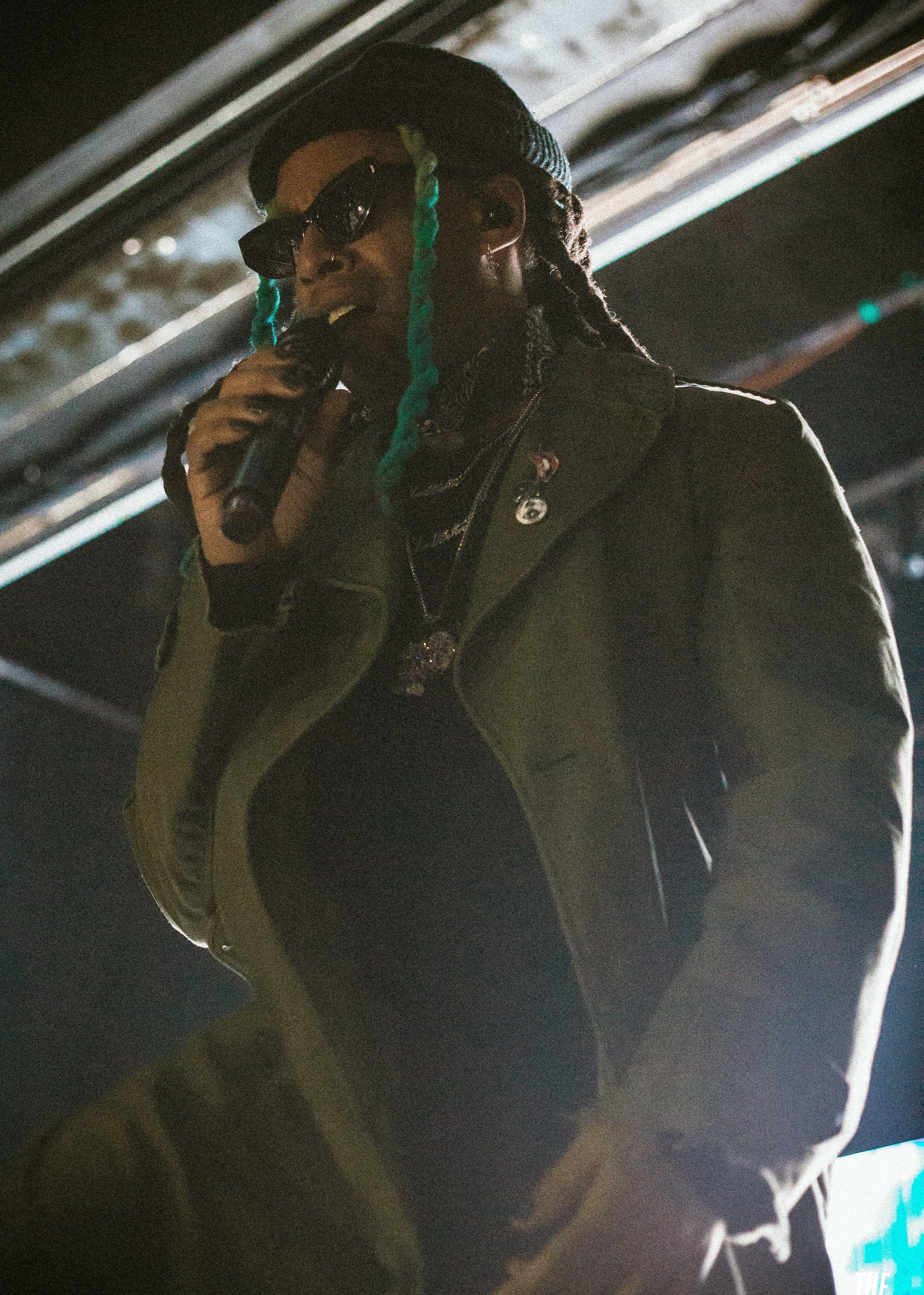
The song features a guest appearance from Ty Dolla Sign, who also appeared on its original version, "The Storm".

West and Ant Clemons first worked together on the rapper's single "All Mine", recorded in Wyoming for his eighth studio album Ye (2018). In September of that year, Clemons received a phone call from his manager, who told the singer that West wanted to meet him in Chicago. When he arrived in the city, Clemons walked into a room with West, fellow rapper Chance the Rapper, and conservative influencer Candace Owens, where he freestyled with the rappers. Clemons recalled that the group went "back and forth just freestyling", with them coming up with "Everything We Need" during the session. He also expressed excitement in having collaborated with West and Ty Dolla Sign a second time, comparing it to "getting struck by lightning twice" and declaring that he felt "blessed with being able to sing about God on a record with these guys". Clemons contributed vocals to "Everything We Need" and fellow Jesus Is King track "Water"; he revealed both tracks came from conversations with West about Jesus and religion, asserting, "A lot of the best songs come from conversations." Of his time around West, Clemons commented that it "has been like the best time to absorb my surroundings" and recalled trying to listen to "hear a lot of the things that you want to know, without even having to ask".

Ty Dolla Sign had become a regular contributor to West's work by 2018, having collaborated with him on three of the seven songs on Ye. Around the time of the album's release, the two both teased the idea of a collaborative project. West also said he is simply "trying to go week after week and improve on the craft", as well as naming Ty Dolla Sign among the strongest artists alive and explaining that "anything I can do to support, get around, produce, take my hands and chop up I'm with it". After Ty Dolla Sign appeared on "Everything We Need", West featured on his single "Ego Death" in July 2020. At the time of the song's release, the musician declared that it is "always an honor working with my brother 'Ye", saying he is "a genius" and the two "make incredible records" whenever they collaborate.

In July 2019, West's track "The Storm" was leaked online by an unknown source. The track featured vocals from Ty Dolla Sign and deceased rapper XXXTentacion, originally recorded during the sessions for West's scrapped album Yandhi and standing among the multiple songs that leaked from the album. "Everything We Need" was recorded as a new version of "The Storm". The song omits multiple elements from the original, including layers of bass, an audio clip from TV series Jersey Shore, and XXXTentacion's verse. Alongside the guest appearances of Ty Dolla Sign and Clemons, it features additional vocals from West's gospel group the Sunday Service Choir. The song stands along with "Water" as one of the numerous tracks that the group had premiered prior to the album's release. "Everything We Need" was one of the three tracks that led to Jesus Is King's release being delayed by mixing modifications.

== Composition and lyrics ==
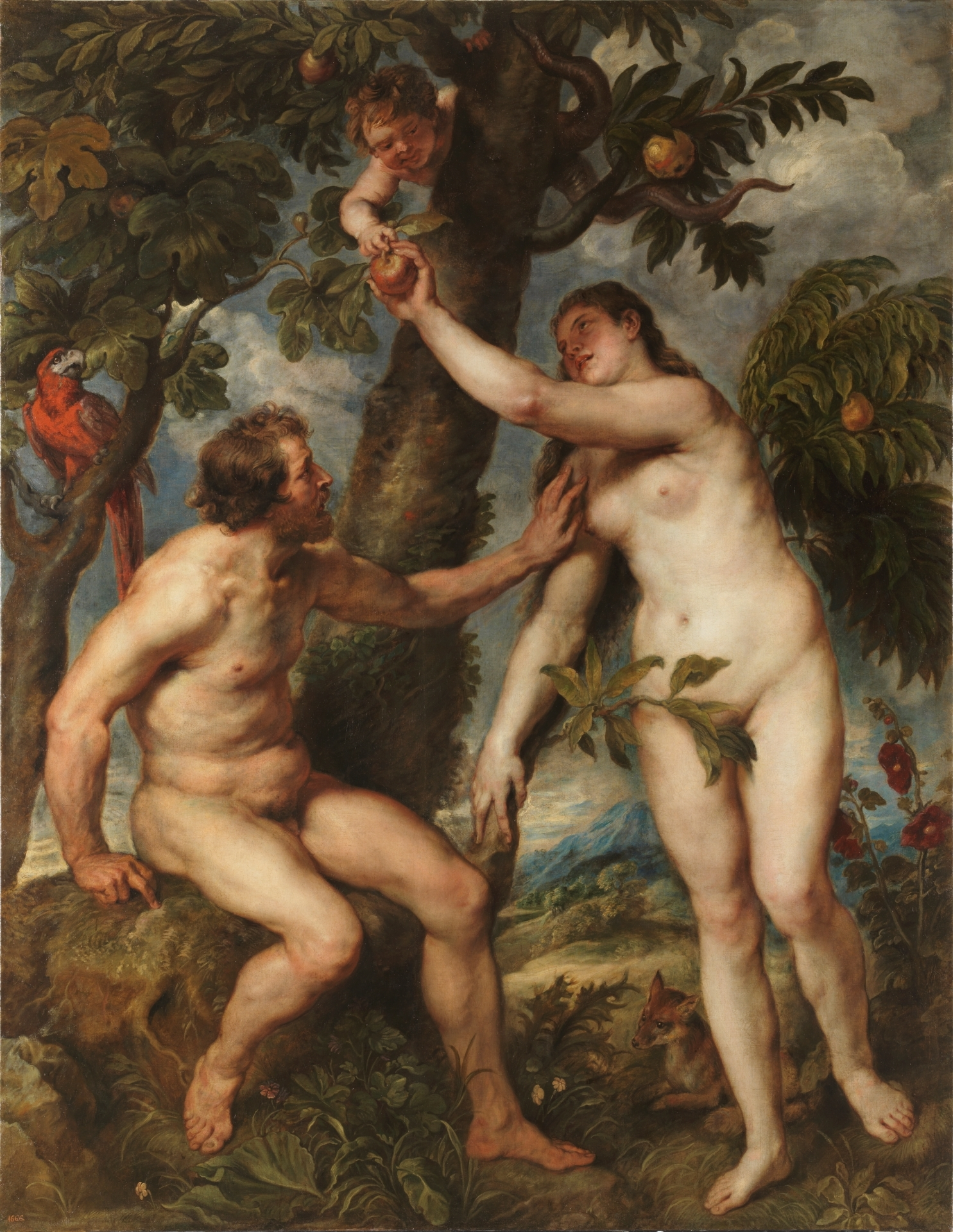
A depiction of Adam and Eve, whose story West references on the song.

Musically, "Everything We Need" is a gospel and R&B ballad, with elements of contemporary trap. It is sonically minimalist, relying on a sparse arrangement. The song includes guitar, contributed by co-writer Bradford Lewis. West enthusiastically raps a series of brief, sharply delivered verses, which are succeeded each time by the song's chorus and bridge. These sections are sang gently by Clemons and Ty Dolla Sign, with the soulful chorus being multi-tracked. The artists accompany West's vocals at points, while a falsetto is contributed by Clemons.

Lyrically, "Everything We Need" follows the theme of using the blessings that freely flow from a religious rebirth to be prepared to meet every hardship and need. Ty Dolla Sign and Clemons deliver lyrical melodies on the chorus, including singing "ooh-ooh, ooh-ooh oh". The two also assert, "We have everything we need." West makes numerous witty remarks, such as "What if Eve made apple juice?/ You gon' do what Adam do?"

== Release and reception ==
On October 25, 2019, "Everything We Need" was included as the sixth track on West's ninth studio album Jesus Is King. West led the Sunday Service Choir through a performance of the song atop a hillside set named "The Mountain" at Coachella on April 21, 2019, coinciding with Easter. This marked the song's debut, though the title had not been formally announced at the time. A performance of the song by the group is included in West's concert film Jesus Is King, which accompanied the album's release.

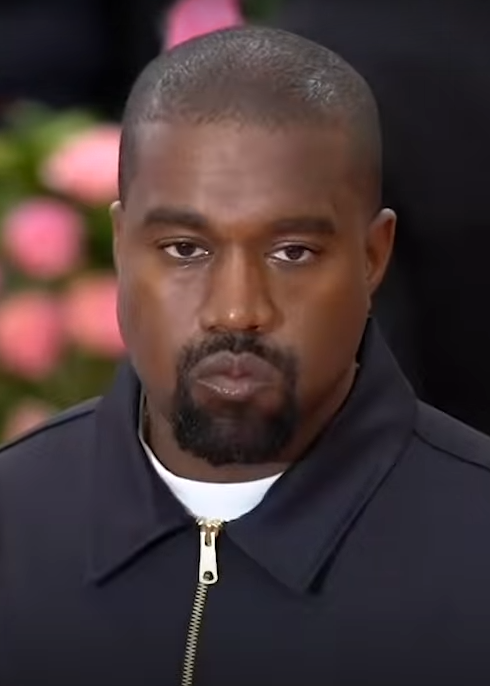
Critical assessments of West's vocals were somewhat mixed, with his delivery garnering praise while the lyricism was panned.

"Everything We Need" was met with lukewarm reviews from music critics, who generally praised Ty Dolla Sign and Clemons' vocals. Matthew Progress from NOW Magazine named the song the album's top track, citing it as the main example of "some of the most captivating melodies" on any of West's projects. Progress commented that "a smooth yet jubilant chorus and bridge" is delivered by Ty Dolla Sign and Clemons, which is "spliced in between West's short, sparse verses" on the R&B-styled "wavy church" ballad. The Independent correspondent Roisin O'Connor identified Clemons as the best feature on Jesus Is King, expressing that "his gentle, Bon Iver-esque tones" perfectly match West's "sharp delivery". In HipHopDX, Aaron McKrell stated that Clemons and Ty Dolla Sign contribute "a catchy, soulful refrain". At Billboard, Carl Lamarre picked it as the fourth best track on the album, feeling grateful for the guest artists' "soothing vocals" that "inject spiritual warmth to Ye's lackluster quips" and "revive the track". Similarly, Brian Josephs of Entertainment Weekly said the song "skates on Ty Dolla Sign and Ant Clemons['] rapturous vocals" that manage to provide "the Kanye-isms [with] levity". Writing for God Is in the TV, Aidy James Stevens noted a stark difference between the song and its Sunday Service performance, declaring that "a calm, contented mood" is set by Clemons' "soft falsetto" and a "bare-bones arrangement", providing "everything we need". Cyclone from The Music viewed the song as a "retooled" version of "The Storm", focusing on how West "raps eccentrically".

In a mixed review for RapReviews, Ryan Feyre assured that Ty Dolla Sign's chorus on "Everything We Need" "could make the sun rise" and is one of the album's "more riveting vocal performances", though felt disappointed in how West's "anemic songwriting falters". On a similar note, The New York Times critic Jon Caramanica saw West's unambitious rapping as "buffeted by transcendent guest singers [...] Clemons and Ty Dolla Sign". Andrew Barker of Variety viewed the song as underdeveloped, feeling that "an absolutely glorious, multitracked vocal hook" is featured from the musician, yet West "never quite figures out what to do with it". In a negative review, The Guardian's Dean Van Nguyen derided its "sonic minimalism" and nakedness as "equally slender" to West's lyrical style throughout Jesus Is King, while declaring that the assertion of having everything needed "feels a bit rich" after the rapper had previously asked Facebook founder Mark Zuckerberg for US$1 billion.

== Commercial performance ==
Following the album's release, the song entered the US Billboard Hot 100 at number 33. With this entry, it became one of Clemons' first two appearances on the chart, simultaneously with "Water". The former also debuted at number five on both the US Christian Songs and Gospel Songs charts. It was less successful on the US Billboard Hot R&B/Hip-Hop Songs chart, reaching number 17. On July 20, 2022, the song was certified gold by the Recording Industry Association of America (RIAA) for pushing 500,000 certified units in the United States, making West become the first artist to have 85 singles earn this certification as a lead act.

"Everything We Need" was most successful in Iceland, peaking at number 19 on the Icelandic Singles Chart. Similarly, the song debuted at number 20 on the Latvian Singles Chart. It peaked at numbers 26 and 27 on the ARIA Singles Chart and NZ Singles Chart, respectively. The song further charted within the top 50 in Canada, Estonia, Denmark, Norway, Lithuania, and Sweden.

== Credits and personnel ==
Credits adapted from Tidal and the BMI Repertoire. (Note: Find additional credits for the song on the BMI Repertoire by searching the work number #40758457.)

- Kanye West – production, songwriter
- FnZ (Michael Mulé and Isaac DeBoni) – production, songwriter
- Ronny J – production, songwriter
- BoogzDaBeast – co-production, songwriter
- Federico Vindver – co-production, songwriter
- Mike Dean – additional production, songwriter, mastering engineer, mixer
- Ant Clemons – songwriter, featured artist
- Ty Dolla Sign – songwriter, featured artist
- Bradford Lewis – songwriter, guitar
- Cydel Young – songwriter
- Josh Berg – songwriter
- Gerard A. Powell – songwriter
- Sunday Service Choir – additional vocals
- Jess Jackson – mixer
- Sage Skolfield – assistant mixer
- Sean Solymar – assistant mixer
- Andrew Drucker – recording engineer
- Jamie Peters – recording engineer
- Jesse Ray Ernster – recording engineer
- Josh Bales – recording engineer
- Josh Berg – recording engineer
- Randy Urbanski – recording engineer
- Shane Fitzgibbon – recording engineer
- Zack Djurich – recording engineer

== Charts ==
=== Weekly charts ===
Chart performance for "Everything We Need"
Chart (2019)	Peak position
Australia (ARIA)	26
Canada Hot 100 (Billboard)	30
Czech Republic Singles Digital (ČNS IFPI)	94
Denmark (Tracklisten)	36
Estonia (Eesti Ekspress)	35
France (SNEP)	103
Greece International Digital Singles (IFPI)	71
Iceland (Tónlistinn)	19
Latvia (LAIPA)	20
Lithuania (AGATA)	42
Netherlands (Single Top 100)	97
New Zealand (Recorded Music NZ)	27
Norway (VG-lista)	39
Portugal (AFP)	54
Slovakia Singles Digital (ČNS IFPI)	94
Sweden (Sverigetopplistan)	45
UK Hip Hop/R&B (Official Charts)	19
US Billboard Hot 100	33
US Hot Christian Songs (Billboard)	5
US Gospel Songs (Billboard)	5
US Hot R&B/Hip-Hop Songs (Billboard)	17
US Rolling Stone Top 100	8

=== Year-end charts ===
2019 year-end chart performance for "Everything We Need"
Chart (2019)	Position
US Christian Songs (Billboard)	46
US Gospel Songs (Billboard)	9

2020 year-end chart performance for "Everything We Need"
Chart (2020)	Position
US Christian Songs (Billboard)	54
US Gospel Songs (Billboard)	8

== Certifications ==
Certifications and sales for "Everything We Need"
Region	Certification	Certified units/sales
United States (RIAA)	Gold	500,000^{‡}
^{‡} Sales+streaming figures based on certification alone.

== See also ==
- 2019 in hip hop music
