= Nah Nah Nah =

2020 single by Kanye West

Single by Kanye West
- Released: October 16, 2020
- Genre: Trap
- Length: 2:58; 3:11 (remix)
- Label: GOOD; Def Jam
- Songwriters: Kanye West; Dwayne Abernathy Jr.
- Producers: Kanye West; Dem Jointz

Kanye West singles chronology
"Ego Death" (2020)	"Nah Nah Nah" (2020)	"Smack DVD" (2020)

Remix cover
- Remix artwork

DaBaby singles chronology
"For the Night" (2020)	"Nah Nah Nah" (remix) (2020)	"Coco" (2020)

2 Chainz singles chronology
"Quarantine Thick" (2020)	"Nah Nah Nah" (remix) (2020)	"Baddest" (2021)

"Nah Nah Nah" is a song by American rapper Kanye West. It was released for digital download and streaming through GOOD Music and Def Jam Recordings on October 16, 2020. The song served as the theme song for West's presidential campaign launched in July of that year. Written and produced by West and American record producer Dem Jointz, the song's lyrics reference West's then-ongoing presidential campaign, his dispute with Universal Music Group, and opinions on the mainstream media.

West first teased "Nah Nah Nah" on Twitter two days before its release, via a video featuring clips from Joaquin Buckley's knockout victory at UFC Fight Island 5 and Star Wars. DJ Pharris debuted the song in full on his Power 92 Chicago show on October 16, and it was sent to music streaming services the same day. The song was inspired by fake presidential polling results from Kentucky, which falsely claimed that West was leading fellow candidates Donald Trump and Joe Biden in early returns.

"Nah Nah Nah" was met with mixed reviews upon its release, with both critics and West's fans responding negatively to its sound. A remix, featuring fellow rappers DaBaby and 2 Chainz, was released on November 13, 2020. The song was West's second and last single as a lead artist in 2020, following "Wash Us in the Blood", featuring American rapper Travis Scott. Both versions of the song were removed from streaming services in August 2021, which was speculated to be due to controversy over homophobic statements DaBaby made the previous month.

== Background and release ==
On October 14, 2020, Kanye West shared a snippet of a song titled "Nah Nah Nah" to Twitter. The clip featured footage of Joaquin Buckley's knockout victory at UFC Fight Island 5 and Star Wars. The song was released after a series of tweets from West celebrating presidential polling results in Kentucky, which later turned out to be fake. It was officially released onto streaming services the night of October 16 after being debuted in full on DJ Pharris' Power 92 Chicago show. The single's cover art was designed by American artist Wes Lang, who had previously worked with West on visuals for his 2013 album Yeezus. He also created the art for the song's remix.

On October 18, West tweeted a screenshot of a text conversation with DaBaby, teasing that he had recorded a verse for a song. The following day, West posted a snippet of DaBaby's verse. On October 29, West posted a longer snippet to his Twitter account of DaBaby's full verse along with a verse from 2 Chainz. The remix was later officially released onto streaming services on November 13.

On August 9, 2021, both versions of the song were removed from all streaming services, which was presumed to be due to controversy over DaBaby's homophobic statements. The rapper would later be featured on the track "Jail pt 2" from West's tenth studio album, Donda, released later that same month.

== Composition ==
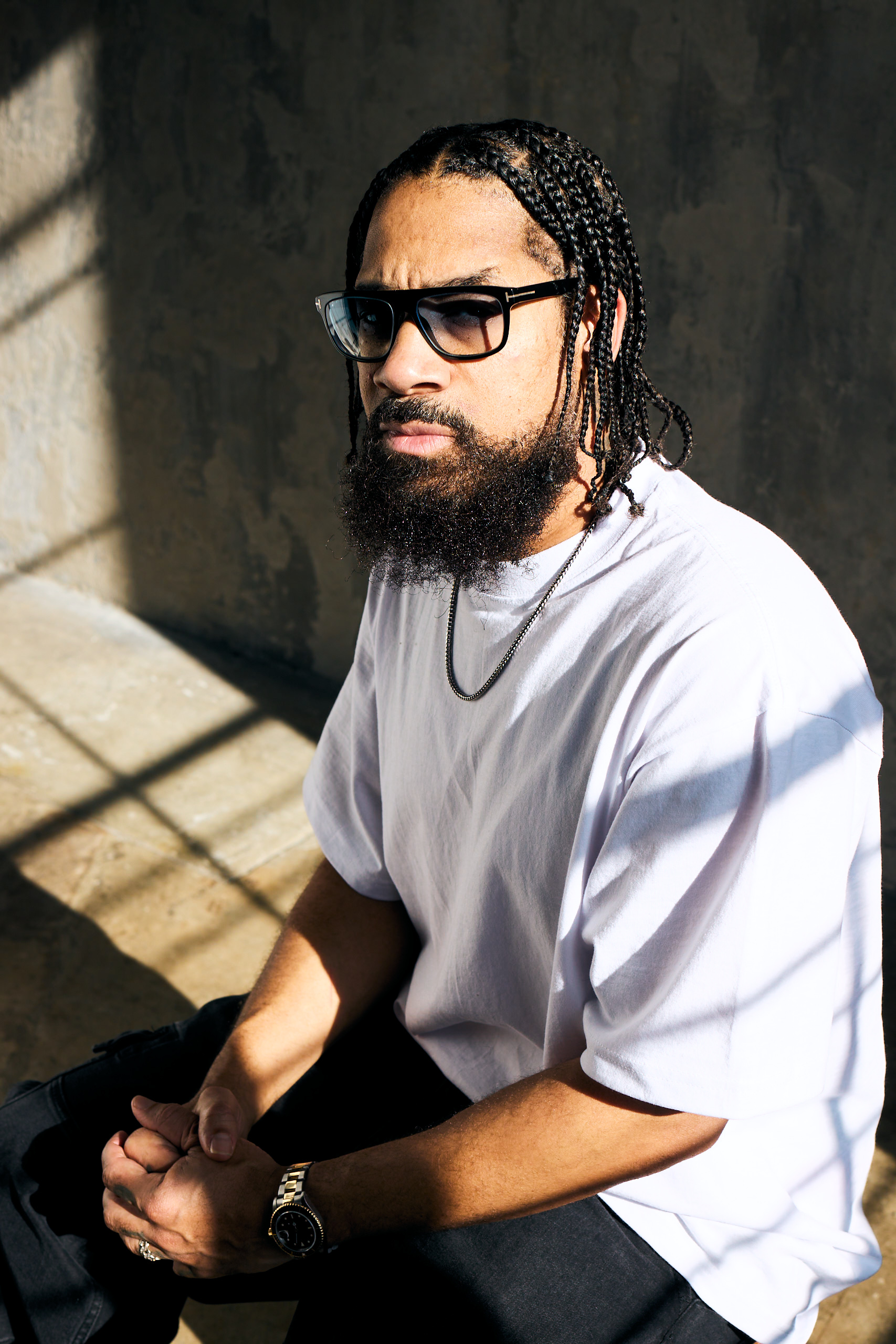
Dem Jointz produced "Nah Nah Nah" alongside West, deriving the song's flute sample from a sample pack.

Written and produced by West and Dem Jointz, "Nah Nah Nah" is a trap song, and served as the theme song for West's 2020 presidential campaign. Its flute sample is derived from a sample library created by BPM Supreme, which Dem Jointz drew inspiration from while producing the track. The song was inspired by fake polling reports from Kentucky, which claimed that West was leading fellow candidates Donald Trump and Joe Biden in early returns.

West's lyrics are freestyled, and reference various events in his life at the time, such as his presidential campaign. The song's chorus advises people to not text him due to being a presidential candidate, and references a scene from Star Wars: Episode III – Revenge of the Sith with the lines "I know you think Obi-Wan gettin' tired now / Don't jump, Anakin, I got the higher ground." In one of his verses, West references his then-recent dispute with Universal Music Group over the details of his contract, comparing the label's executives to slave masters as he raps that if he "put[s] myself in harm's way to get my own masters / They'll put theyself in harm's way to stay the master".

== Reception ==
"Nah Nah Nah" was met with mixed reception upon release. In a review for HotNewHipHop, Alexander Cole referred to its instrumental as "bizarre", comparing it to a soundtrack from an early 2000s video game. In a more positive review for Rapzilla, Micah Marshall saw the song as a response to criticism that West had received from Evangelical Christians since his shift into making religious music. Marshall found the song to be representative of criticism that other Christian celebrities have faced in the past, especially those who have either been accused of exploiting Christianity for fame or critiqued for collaborating with secular artists.

Much of the song's negative reception came from West's fans. They often criticized the track's sound and overall quality, suggesting West shouldve kept it unreleased. The song also saw little success commercially, with both the original song and its remix solely charting on the New Zealand Hot Singles chart at number 18 and 34, respectively.

== Charts ==
=== Original ===
Chart (2020)	Peak position
New Zealand Hot Singles (RMNZ)	18

=== Remix ===
Chart (2020)	Peak position
New Zealand Hot Singles (RMNZ)	34

== Release history ==
Region	Date	Format(s)	Label(s)	Ref.
Various	October 16, 2020	Digital download	GOOD; Def Jam	
Various	November 13, 2020	Remix	GOOD; Def Jam	
