= Tunnel Vision (Itzy song) =

- Remixes cover

Single by Itzy

from the EP Tunnel Vision
- Language: Korean
- Released: November 10, 2025
- Length: 3:05
- Label: JYP; Republic
- Composers: Dem Jointz; Ryan Jhun; Amanda "Kiddo" Ibanez; 8AE; Ido Nadjar
- Lyricists: Noday; Lee Soon-gan (Lalala Studio); Lee To-reu (Lalala Studio)

Itzy singles chronology
"Rock & Roll" (2025)	"Tunnel Vision" (2025)	"Motto" (2026)

Music video
- "Tunnel Vision" on YouTube

Professional ratings
Review scores
Source	Rating
IZM	1.5/5 stars

"Tunnel Vision" is a song recorded by South Korean girl group Itzy for their eleventh extended play of the same name. It was released as the EP's lead single by JYP Entertainment on November 10, 2025.

== Background and release ==
On October 17, JYP Entertainment posted a trailer, track list, and promotion schedule for Itzy's eleventh EP Tunnel Vision. The schedule announced that concept photos would be released at the end of October, along with music video teasers on November 3 and 5.

== Composition ==
"Tunnel Vision" was composed by Dem Jointz, Ryan Jhun, Amanda "Kiddo" Ibanez, 8AE, Ido Nadjar and written by Noday, Lee Soon-gan (Lalala Studio), Lee To-reu (Lalala Studio). It is a dance track featuring a hip-hop-based beat and brass sounds.

== Promotion ==
Itzy first performed "Tunnel Vision" on November 13 on Music Bank. They also performed on two other music programs during their first week of promotions: Show! Music Core on November 14 and SBS's Inkigayo on November 15. In the second week, they performed on Music Bank (November 21), Show! Music Core (November 22), and Inkigayo (November 23).

== Track listing ==
- Digital download and streaming – Remixes
1. "Tunnel Vision" (R.Tee remix) – 2:35
2. "Tunnel Vision" (Imlay remix) – 3:07
3. "Tunnel Vision" (2Spade remix) – 2:25
4. "Tunnel Vision" (Cifika remix) – 3:16
5. "Tunnel Vision" (English version) – 3:04
6. "Tunnel Vision" (Instrumental) – 3:05

== Credits and personnel ==
Credits adapted from Tidal.

Personnel

- Itzy – vocals
- Dem Jointz – producer, composer, programmer
- Ryan Jhun – producer, composer, vocal arranger, programmer
- Alexis Andrea Boyd a.k.a. 8AE – composer
- Amanda "Kiddo" Ibanez – composer
- Ido Nadjar – composer
- En Jin Yu – Sound editor
- JongLik GU – atmos mixing engineer
- p.o.d – assistant atmos mixing engineer
- Namwoo Kwon – mastering engineer
- Alawn – mixing engineer
- Perrie – background vocals
- Lee Soon-gan (lalala studio) – lyricist, writer
- Noday – lyricist, writer, vocal arranger
- Lee To-reu (lalala studio) – lyricist, writer
- Sangyeop Lee – Sound editor
- Eunjung Park – Sound editor
- Kwak Boeun – recording engineer
- Seo Eun II – recording engineer

== Charts ==
Chart performance for "Tunnel Vision"
Chart (2025)	Peak position
South Korea (Circle)	104

== Accolades ==
Music program awards for "Tunnel Vision"
Program	Date	Ref.
Music Bank	November 21, 2025	

== Release history ==
Release history for "Tunnel Vision"
Region	Date	Format	Label
Various	November 10, 2025	Digital download; streaming	JYP; Republic
