= Ad Mare =

- Digital cover

Single album by Nmixx
- Released: February 22, 2022
- Length: 11:20
- Language: Korean
- Label: JYP

Nmixx chronology
Ad Mare (2022)	Entwurf (2022)

Singles from Ad Mare
- 1. "O.O" Released: February 22, 2022

Ad Mare (Latin, "To The Sea") is the debut single album by South Korean girl group Nmixx. The single album was released by JYP Entertainment on February 22, 2022, and contains four tracks, containing lead single "O.O", B-side "Tank" (占), and instrumentals for both songs.

== Background and release ==
On July 9, 2021, JYP Entertainment announced it would be debuting a new girl group in February 2022, the first since Itzy in 2019. On February 2, 2022, it was announced that the group would debut on February 22 with the release of Ad Mare. Six days later, the track listing was released with "O.O" announced as the lead single. On February 17, the first music video teaser for "O.O" was released. Two days later, the highlight medley video teaser was released. On February 21, the second music video teaser for "O.O" was released. The single album alongside the music video for "O.O" was released on February 22.

== Composition ==
The lead single "O.O" was described as a song with "mixture of baile funk and teen pop rock" genres with "intense captivating trap intro". "Tank" was described as a song with "groovy vocals and unique raps" that features member Lily's "timbre and explosive treble" with lyrics that "compares the confident and ambitious attitude to a tank".

== Critical reception ==
Professional ratings
Review scores
Source	Rating
NME	2/5 stars

Tanu I. Raj from NME gave Ad Mare 2 out of 5 stars, calling it "inconsistent" and "choppy" due to the uneven transitions from electropop to pop rock to hip hop in "O.O" Although he appreciated the simpler melodies in "Tank", he concluded that the latter was not able "to alleviate the damage that 'O.O' does".

== Commercial performance ==
Ad Mare debuted at number three on South Korea's Gaon Album Chart in the chart issue dated February 20–26, 2022; on the monthly chart, the single album debuted at number three in the chart issue for February 2022 with 161,312 copies sold.

== Promotion ==
On February 18, 2022, JYP Entertainment announced that the group debut showcase would be postponed to March 1 after member Bae was diagnosed with COVID-19.

== Track listing ==
Track listing for Ad Mare
No.	Title	Lyrics	Music	Arrangement	Length
1.	"Tank" (占)	Dr.JO (153/Joombas); Oh Hyun-seon (Lalala Studio); Jung Jun-ho; Oh Yu-won	Dwayne Abernathy Jr.; Ryan S. Jhun; Ericka J. Coulter; Deanna DellaCioppa; Matthew Jaragin	Dem Jointz; Ryan S. Jhun	2:48
2.	"O.O"	Dr.JO (153/Joombas)	Brian U (The Hub); Enan (The Hub); MarkAlong (The Hub); Charlotte Wilson (The Hub); Chanti (The Hub); EJAE; Awry (The Hub); Ayushy (The Hub); Jan Baars (The Hub); Rajan Muse (The Hub)	Brian U (The Hub); Enan (The Hub); MarkAlong (The Hub)	2:52
3.	"Tank" (占; Inst.)		Dwayne Abernathy Jr.; Ryan S. Jhun; Ericka J. Coulter; Deanna DellaCioppa; Matthew Jaragin	Dem Jointz; Ryan S. Jhun	2:48
4.	"O.O" (Inst.)		Brian U (The Hub); Enan (The Hub); MarkAlong (The Hub); Charlotte Wilson (The Hub); Chanti (The Hub); EJAE; Awry (The Hub); Ayushy (The Hub); Jan Baars (The Hub); Rajan Muse (The Hub)	Brian U (The Hub); Enan (The Hub); MarkAlong (The Hub)	2:52
Total length:					11:20

== Credits and personnel ==
Credits adapted from Melon.

Studio

- A Team Studio – recording (track 1 and 3)
- JYPE Studios – recording (track 2 and 4), vocal editing (track 2)
- Alawn Music Studios – mixing (track 1 and 3)
- Canton House Studios – mixing (track 2 and 4)
- 821 Sound Mastering – mastering (track 1 and 3)
- Sterling Sound – mastering (track 2 and 4)

Personnel

- Dr.JO (153/Joombas) – lyrics (track 1 and 2)
- Oh Hyun-seon (Lalala Studio) – lyrics (track 1)
- Jung Jun-ho – lyrics (track 1)
- Oh Yu-won – lyrics (track 1)
- Dwayne Abernathy Jr. – composition (track 1 and 3)
- Ryan S. Jhun – composition, arrangement (track 1 and 3)
- Ericka J. Coulter – composition (track 1 and 3), background vocals (track 1)
- Deanna DellaCioppa – composition (track 1 and 3)
- Matthew Jaragin – composition (track 1 and 3)
- Brian U (The Hub) – composition, arrangement, drums, synths (track 2 and 4)
- Enan (The Hub) – composition, arrangement, drums, synths (track 2 and 4),
- MarkAlong (The Hub) – composition, arrangement, drums, synths (track 2 and 4)
- Charlotte Wilson (The Hub) – composition (track 2 and 4), vocal directing (track 2)
- Chanti (The Hub) – composition (track 2 and 4)
- EJAE – composition (track 2 and 4), background vocals (track 2), vocal directing (track 2)
- Awry (The Hub) – composition (track 2 and 4), background vocals (track 4)
- Ayushy (The Hub) – composition (track 2 and 4)
- Jan Baars (The Hub) – composition (track 2 and 4)
- Rajan Muse (The Hub) – composition (track 2 and 4)
- Dem Jointz – arrangement, keyboard, drums (track 1 and 3)
- Jade – bass (track 2 and 4)
- BananaGaraG – bass (track 2 and 4)
- Paper Planet – guitar (track 2 and 4)
- TRIAD – guitar (track 2 and 4)
- Lily – background vocals (track 1)
- Frankie Day – background vocals (track 2)
- Ayushy – background vocals (track 2)
- Brian U (The Hub) – vocal directing (track 2)
- Enan (The Hub) – vocal directing (track 2)
- MJ – recording (track 1 and 3)
- Gun Hye-jin – recording (track 2 and 4)
- Lee Kyung-won – digital editing (track 1 and 3)
- Lee Sang-yeob – vocal editing (track 2)
- Jiyoung Shin NYC – vocal editing (track 2)
- Alawn – mixing (track 1 and 3)
- Jaycen Joshua – mixing (track 2 and 4)
- Jacob Richards – mixing (assistant) (track 2 and 4)
- Mike Seaberg – mixing (assistant) (track 2 and 4)
- DJ Riggins – mixing (assistant) (track 2 and 4)
- Kwon Nam-woo – mastering (track 1 and 3)
- Chris Gehringer – mastering (track 2 and 4)

== Charts ==
=== Weekly charts ===
Weekly chart performance for Ad Mare
Chart (2022)	Peak position
Japan Combined Singles (Oricon)	29
South Korean Albums (Gaon)	1

=== Monthly charts ===
Monthly chart performance for Ad Mare
Chart (2022)	Peak position
South Korean Albums (Gaon)	3

=== Year-end chart ===
Year-end chart performance for Ad Mare
Chart (2022)	Peak position
South Korea Albums (Circle)	35

== Certifications ==
Certifications and sales for Ad Mare
Region	Certification	Certified units/sales
South Korea (KMCA)	2× Platinum	500,000^{^}
^{^} Shipments figures based on certification alone.

== Release history ==
Release history for Ad Mare
Region	Date	Format	Label
South Korea	February 22, 2022	CD	JYP
Various	February 22, 2022	Digital download; streaming	JYP
