= Closed on Sunday =

2019 song by Kanye West

Single by Kanye West

from the album Jesus Is King
- Released: November 28, 2019
- Recorded: April – October 24, 2019
- Genre: Christian hip hop; gospel
- Length: 2:32
- Label: GOOD; Def Jam
- Songwriters: Kanye West; Angel Lopez; Brian Miller; Chango Farías Gómez; Federico Vindver; Gene Thornton; Rennard East; Terrence Thornton; Timothy Mosley; Victory Elyse Boyd
- Producers: Kanye West; Angel Lopez; Brian "AllDay" Miller; Federico Vindver; Timbaland

Kanye West singles chronology
"Follow God" (2019)	"Closed on Sunday" (2019)	"Wash Us in the Blood" (2020)

Music video
- "Closed on Sunday" on YouTube

"Closed on Sunday" is a song by American rapper Kanye West from his ninth studio album, Jesus Is King (2019). The song was produced by West, Angel Lopez, Brian "AllDay" Miller, Federico Vindver, and Timbaland. It was co-written by the producers with No Malice, Rennard East, Pusha T and Victory Elyse Boyd, and since the song samples work by Grupo Vocal Argentino, a songwriting credit was added for Chango Farías Gómez. On November 28, 2019, the song was released by West's record labels GOOD Music and Def Jam as the second single from the album. A religious hip hop song, it is based around a sample of "Martín Fierro", performed by Grupo Vocal Argentino.

The song's lyrics see West emphasizing Sunday Sabbatarianism, alongside him referencing the closure of Chick-fil-A on the Lord's Day. Since being released, "Closed on Sunday" has received generally negative reviews from music critics. They often criticized the lyrical content, mostly placing focus on the referencing of Chick-fil-A. Despite the negative reception, the song received a nomination for Top Gospel Song at the 2020 Billboard Music Awards. It reached number 17 on the US Billboard Hot 100, while further attaining top 20 positions in Australia, Canada, Ireland, Latvia, and the United Kingdom.

A music video for "Closed on Sunday" was released on November 28, 2019, coinciding with Thanksgiving in the United States. The video has a family theme, with it featuring West and Kim Kardashian, accompanied by their four children. The version of the song used for the visual features vocals from the Sunday Service Choir and North West. In October 2019, the song was performed by Kanye West and the Sunday Service Choir alongside a band on Jimmy Kimmel Live!. The performance received positive reviews from critics, with general praise for the chemistry of the performers. The song has since been performed during Sunday Service concerts on multiple occasions. It was covered by Chris Tomlin in October 2019.

== Background and development ==
In December 2018, West collaborator Timbaland and American record producer Federico Vindver took part in recording sessions with numerous rappers in Miami, including Saweetie and Lil Mosey. West showed up to the sessions in under 24 hours, with Vindver recalling that he and Timbaland were "blown away" when West started "playing tracks for the Yandhi project." (Note: Yandhi was ultimately scrapped and replaced with Jesus Is King.) Vindver explained the collaborative process between West and Timbaland, saying: "Timbaland would freestyle with him in the studio — Tim on the drum machine, Kanye singing in real time. He wanted to make more healing music at that time. But he was still finding what it was." West and Timbaland were reported to be working together in Miami again during January 2019 for completion of the album, alongside rappers Lil Wayne, 2 Chainz, and YNW Melly, among others. In addition to "Closed on Sunday", Timbaland contributed production to Jesus Is King tracks "Water", "Hands On", "Use This Gospel", and "Jesus Is Lord". Timbaland produced the former of the five tracks with West, Angel Lopez, Brian "AllDay" Miller, and Vindver.

The song samples "Martín Fierro" (1970) by Argentinian folk group Grupo Vocal Argentino, and the group's director Chango Farías Gómez had died in 2011, meaning that the sample was posthumous. Speaking to Silencio, Vindver stated that generally, several producers are in charge of looking for the samples for most of West's songs. Vindver elaborated, saying that Miller "goes through the internet and record stores where he gets mp3s, vinyl and a lot of weird stuff," and found the Grupo Vocal Argentino sample when he was looking for Latin American music. West introduced Vindver to Miller in 2018 and Miller then showed him the sample; Vindver explained that after they found a loop, West "recorded his raps on it, and then we replaced the guitars and recorded the vocals with Kanye's gospel chorus," though he admitted to West not knowing who Gomez is or "who many other artists are." Due to having composed the recording, Gómez received credit as a writer on "Closed on Sunday". West, Lopez, Miller, Vindver, No Malice, Rennard East, Pusha T, Timbaland, and Victory Elyse Boyd are also credited writers on the song.

In August 2019, West's wife Kim Kardashian shared a track list for Jesus Is King that included a track titled "Sunday". Two months later, "Closed on Sunday" was revealed to be set for inclusion on the album, though it was not known if the track was a retitled version of "Sunday". The line "Closed on Sunday, you're my Chick-fil-A" was revealed by West to have been recorded as a Voice Memo on his iPhone, which West first starting doing for his sixth studio album Yeezus (2013). Prior to referencing American fast food restaurant chain Chick-fil-A within the song, West had often shown his appreciation for fast food. West tweeted in 2016 that the company McDonald's is "my favorite brand," while he later called it "my favorite restaurant" in 2018.

== Composition and lyrics ==
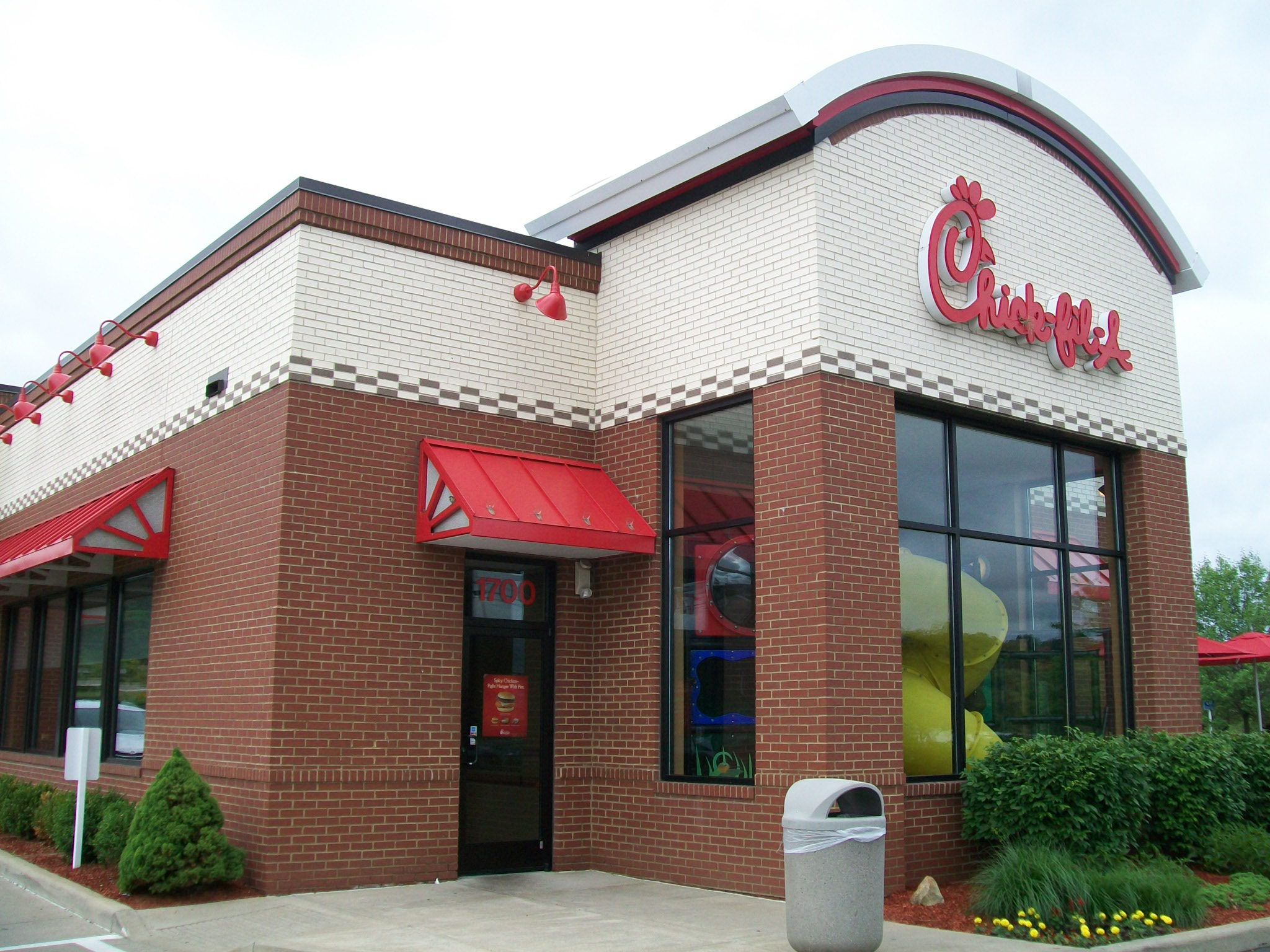
West uses the song's lyrics to reference American fast food restaurant chain Chick-fil-A.

Musically, "Closed on Sunday" is a hip hop track. The track includes samples of "Martín Fierro", written by Gómez and performed by Grupo Vocal Argentino. For the opening of the track, a fragment of the recording is used. Guitars are sampled from the recording, being used as the basis for the track and the sample was described as featuring "eerie yet melodic strings." The song features a gospel chorus, which is performed by West.

The lyrics of the song feature West highlighting the traditional Christian doctrine of Sunday Sabbatarianism, while he sings about Chick-fil-A. West praises the fast-food chain for being closed on the Lord's Day of Sunday, referencing Exodus 20:8:11, which he directs praise towards due to the closure allowing people to rest. West places emphasis on the importance of Christian Sabbath and links it with "the end of imprisonment, slavery, and debt peonage," expressing the same point as Pope Benedict XVI. In the chorus, West sings the line "Closed on Sunday, you my Chick-fil-A." The song also features West mentioning his favourite order from the fast-food chain: "You're my number one, with the lemonade." With certain lyrics, West pleads for his listeners to observe the Lord's Day similarly to how Chick-fil-A does. The song concludes with a high pitched voice that cries, "Chick-fil-A!"

== Release and promotion ==
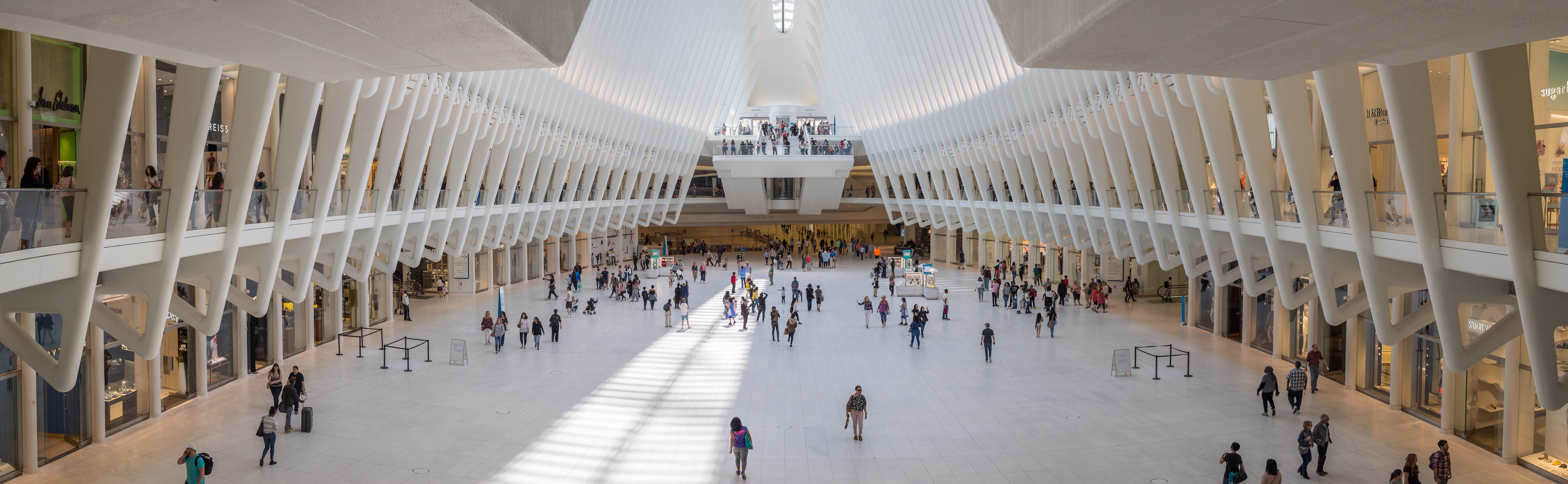
West and the Sunday Service Choir delivered a performance of the song at the Oculus, which was met by positive reviews from critics after premiering via Jimmy Kimmel Live!.

"Closed on Sunday" was released on October 25, 2019, as the fourth track on West's ninth studio album Jesus Is King. The song was later released as the album's second single on November 28, 2019. Prior to the album's release, it had been played during listening parties for Jesus Is King. West and his gospel group the Sunday Service Choir performed the song live together at the Oculus in Manhattan on October 25, 2019, with the performance airing that same day on Jimmy Kimmel Live!. A brass section was included from an accompanying band, adding a live instrument spin to the song. West and the Sunday Service Choir wore matching dark navy blue tops for the performance, despite the structure having a white appearance. Similarly, the band wore dark blue that matched the aesthetic of the rollout for Jesus Is King. The performance lasted for around two minutes and was uploaded to West's YouTube channel on October 28, 2019. Michael Saponara from Billboard called the performance a "heavenly set" that West was joined by the Sunday Service Choir and a brass section for the completion of, while analysing the "matching dark navy blue tops" worn by everyone as what "bounced off the structure's white appearance." Robin Bacior of Consequence said that West and the Sunday Service Choir "bounced through the rumbling tune, their interlocked voices carrying the song." Complex's Brian Josephs called the performance "joyous," while Chris Stack from Dancing Astronaut described the instrument spin as being "encompassed by a beautiful open space to the produced track." Stack continued, writing that, "The community feel and build take on a new era of Kanye," while West "continues his life journey through fatherhood and gospel-focused music."

During their concert on November 1, 2019, in Baton Rouge, Louisiana, the Sunday Service Choir opened with a performance of "Closed on Sunday". The group performed it for Scott Dawson Evangelistic Association's "Strength to Stand Conference" on January 19, 2020, and the song was popular with the crowd. West delivered a performance of the song for a Sunday Service concert at the LeConte Center in Pigeon Forge on January 19, 2020. During another one of the concerts, in the Credit Union 1 Arena of West's hometown of Chicago on February 16 of that year, he performed the song.

== Reception ==
"Closed on Sunday" has been met with generally negative reviews from music critics, with many criticizing West's lyricism. Insider named the song as one of the worst tracks of 2019, with Callie Ahlgrim saying it is "hard to believe" that after releasing "lyrical masterpieces" such as "Black Skinhead" (2013) and "Runaway" (2010) that West "actually wrote and released a song that's all about" Kardashian being compared "to... Chick-fil-A." The song was also listed as one of the year's worst by Spin, and the staff said that it "might be the most forgettable Kanye West song to date if not for the sheer inescapability of one line: 'Closed on Sunday, you're my Chick-fil-A.'" Forbes ranked the song as the second worst track of 2019, with Bryan Rolli calling it "a dour, preachy ballad anchored by melodramatic acoustic guitar arpeggios and ham-fisted lyrics about waging spiritual warfare." Brian Josephs of Entertainment Weekly labeled the song "the album's immediate meme thanks to the banal refrain" and attributed the "virality" to "how it sounds like the raving of an altar boy getting in his last chuckles before mass," while he noted the song's clumsiness. Writing for The Independent, Roisin O'Connor stated that the "biblical terminology" of the song "reminds you of the preachers on street corners shouting at passers-by that they're going to hell – you feel uncomfortable and vaguely embarrassed on their behalf." The Guardian writer Dean Van Nguyen branded West's suggestion of "turning off Instagram to spend more time praying with family" within the song as "a statement that would spark significant eye-rolling from kid worshippers if they heard it coming from the church pulpit." In Spectrum Culture, Daniel Bromfield noted the song for being the only time on the album where "the trollish Trump energy that defined Kanye's Wyoming work creeps in."

A few reviewers received the song less negatively. Aidy James Stevens from God Is in the TV was somewhat mixed, calling the song "a darker, brooding afair akin" to Yeezus, though he stated that the Chick-fil-A line "really made me consider my position" as a fan of West and concluded by labeling the lyric "a bit of a dampener on what is otherwise a callback to some of Ye's greatest work." NME's Jordan Bassett wrote that the referencing of Chick-fil-A "will draw jokey headlines," despite admitting the song's message "is actually quite humble and grounding." Will Rosebury was most enthusiastic in Clash, citing the song as one of the best tracks on Jesus Is King and writing that it manages "to thematically balance out, as Kanye discusses his life within the context of his new found faith."

"Closed on Sunday" was nominated for Top Gospel Song at the 2020 Billboard Music Awards, ultimately losing the award to fellow album track "Follow God".

== Music video ==
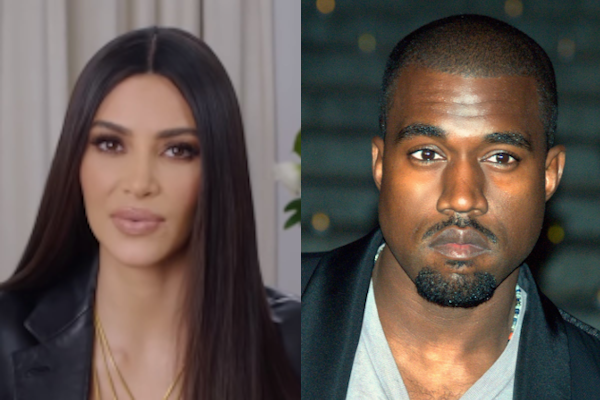
West and his then wife Kim Kardashian (pictured right and left, respectively) both appear in the music video.

An accompanying music video was directed by Jake Schreier and filmed on West's ranch in Cody, Wyoming. Prior to filming it in Cody, West had shot the video for previous Jesus Is King single "Follow God" in the city, which was released in November 2019. On November 27, 2019, West announced the world premiere of the music video for the following day and followed through with the proposed release date, coinciding with the year's date of Thanksgiving in the United States. The clip stands as West's second video to feature Kardashian, following on from "Bound 2" (2013). Before Kanye's father Ray West appeared in it, he had made a cameo in the visual for "Follow God".

The music video is dimly lit and centered around family, beginning with Kanye and Kardashian cuddling with their children; North, Saint, Chicago, and Psalm West, who are sleeping. Kardashian also has her eyes closed and Kanye West appears to be keeping watch, with the couple and their children being sat in the cleft of a rock formation, which is on a hill. The family members then walk hand-in-hand across a stone plateau, as the first verse of "Closed on Sunday" plays in the background. In the following scene, other members of the Kardashian-West family and members of the Sunday Service Choir both arrive in a convoy of all-terrain vehicles (ATVs). Kanye's then mother-in-law Kris Jenner steps out of an army tank wearing a fur coat, leather gloves and diamond earrings, joining a large group of the extended family that wears Carhartts, including Ray. The camera then zooms out to a shot of a group that shows Kanye's then sister-in-law Kourtney Kardashian and her children Mason Dash, Penelope Scotland and Reign Aston, front and centre, accompanied by the West children, their mother, and Jenner. Kanye West later stands alone on a rocky outcrop in the video before dropping to his knees, bowing his head, and raising his hand while the line "I pray to God that he'll strengthen my hand" is heard. West is surrounded by the Sunday Service Choir, with them doing this while he stands on the higher ground, and the group sing the last lyrics of the song. The music video concludes with a close-up shot of North West screaming "Chick-fil-A," differentiating from the original version of the song where the line is performed by her father.

== Commercial performance ==
Following Jesus Is King's release, "Closed on Sunday" entered the US Billboard Hot 100 at number 17. The song lasted for two weeks on the Hot 100. It debuted at number two on the US Christian Songs chart, later becoming Kanye West's second most successful release on the chart. On the Gospel Songs chart, the song charted identically by also opening at number two. That same week, it reached number eight on the US Hot R&B/Hip-Hop Songs chart. On September 15, 2020, "Closed on Sunday" was certified gold by the Recording Industry Association of America (RIAA) for sales of 500,000 certified units in the US.

Elsewhere, the track charted at number 20 on the Canadian Hot 100. It performed similarly in Australia, reaching number 19 on the ARIA Singles Chart. On the New Zealand Singles Chart, the track reached number 26. The track performed best in Latvia, peaking at number 15. It reached number 19 and 20 on the Irish Singles Chart and UK Singles Chart, respectively, remaining on the latter chart for two weeks in total. The track charted in the top 40 of Denmark, Estonia, Iceland, Lithuania, and Slovakia.

== In popular culture ==
After the release of the album, "Closed on Sunday" was criticized by many users of Twitter. Most of them panned the Chick-fil-A referencing, which they often viewed as promoting anti-LGBTQ+ discrimination. American fast food restaurant chain Burger King tweeted "open on sunday" on October 25, 2019, indicating shade towards West and Chick-fil-A. Three days later, contemporary Christian music artist Chris Tomlin released a video of him covering the song via Twitter. During a round of the primetime Jeopardy! tournament Jeopardy! The Greatest of All Time on January 15, 2020, host Alex Trebek gave the clue for a question about West's discography by stating, "'Follow God' and 'Closed on Sunday' are tracks on this 2019 Kanye West album." The contestants Ken Jennings, Brad Rutter and James Holzhauer failed to correctly answer with Jesus Is King. West collaborator Consequence freestyled his version of the song under the title of "Cons On Sunday (Remix)" on February 11, 2020, sampling the original's guitar over more urgent percussion.

For his new 2025 album, French rapper Rilès sampled this song within the framework of his album Survival Mode in OBVIOUS song.

== Credits and personnel ==
Credits adapted from Tidal.

- Kanye West – producer, songwriter
- Angel Lopez – producer, songwriter
- Brian "AllDay" Miller – producer, songwriter
- Federico Vindver – producer, songwriter
- Timbaland – producer, songwriter
- Chango Farías Gómez – songwriter
- No Malice – songwriter
- Rennard East – songwriter
- Pusha T – songwriter
- Victory Elyse Boyd – songwriter
- Mike Dean – mastering engineer, mixer
- Jess Jackson – mixer
- Sage Skolfield – assistant mixer
- Sean Solymar – assistant mixer
- Andrew Drucker – recording engineer
- Josh Bales – recording engineer
- Josh Berg – recording engineer
- Randy Urbanski – recording engineer

== Charts ==
=== Weekly charts ===
Chart performance for "Closed on Sunday"
Chart (2019)	Peak position
Australia (ARIA)	19
Austria (Ö3 Austria Top 40)	73
Canada Hot 100 (Billboard)	20
Czech Republic Singles Digital (ČNS IFPI)	69
Denmark (Tracklisten)	28
Estonia (Eesti Tipp-40)	26
France (SNEP)	86
Greece International Digital Singles (IFPI)	55
Hungary (Stream Top 40)	35
Iceland (Tónlistinn)	27
Ireland (IRMA)	19
Italy (FIMI)	96
Latvia (LAIPA)	15
Lithuania (AGATA)	31
Netherlands (Single Top 100)	93
New Zealand (Recorded Music NZ)	26
Portugal (AFP)	45
Slovakia Singles Digital (ČNS IFPI)	21
Sweden (Sverigetopplistan)	71
Switzerland (Schweizer Hitparade)	45
UK Singles (Official Charts)	20
UK Hip Hop/R&B (Official Charts)	13
US Billboard Hot 100	17
US Hot Christian Songs (Billboard)	2
US Gospel Songs (Billboard)	2
US Hot R&B/Hip-Hop Songs (Billboard)	8
US Rolling Stone Top 100	3

=== Year-end charts ===
2019 year-end chart performance for "Closed on Sunday"
Chart (2019)	Position
US Christian Songs (Billboard)	36
US Gospel Songs (Billboard)	5

2020 year-end chart performance for "Closed on Sunday"
Chart (2020)	Position
US Christian Songs (Billboard)	36
US Gospel Songs (Billboard)	3

== Certifications ==
Certifications and sales for "Closed on Sunday"
Region	Certification	Certified units/sales
United States (RIAA)	Gold	500,000^{‡}
^{‡} Sales+streaming figures based on certification alone.
