= Motto (Itzy song) =

- Remixes cover

Single by Itzy

from the EP Motto
- Language: Korean
- Released: May 18, 2026
- Length: 3:13
- Label: JYP; Republic
- Composers: Rouno; Justin Reinstein; Morgan Kubes
- Lyricists: Gu Seong-min (Artiffect); Bang Hye-hyun; Noday

Itzy singles chronology
"Tunnel Vision" (2025)	"Motto" (2026)

Music video
- "Motto" on YouTube

Professional ratings
Review scores
Source	Rating
IZM	3.5/5 stars

"Motto" is a song recorded by South Korean girl group Itzy for their twelfth extended play of the same name. It was released as the EP's lead single by JYP Entertainment on May 18, 2026.

== Background and release ==
On April 22, JYP Entertainment released the trailer, track list, and schedule of Itzy's new mini album Motto on its social media accounts and announced the news of their comeback. On May 10, the highlight melody was released in which a part of "Motto" was first heard. Music video teasers were released on May 13 and May 14, Itzy held a countdown live on May 18 an hour before the release to celebrate the EP.

== Composition ==
"Motto" was composed by Rouno, Justin Reinstein, Morgan Kubes and written by Gu Seong-min (Artiffect), Bang Hye-hyen and Noday. "Motto" is described as a song with a trendy melody with a sense of freshness, and it gives fans a pleasant impression with a solid message of "Nevertheless, I choose myself". The song is composed in the key B Minor and has 124 beats per minute and a running time of 3 minutes and 13 seconds.

== Promotion ==
Itzy first performed "Motto'" on Mnet M Countdown show on May 21. Itzy also performed on three other music programs in the first week of promotion: Music Bank on May 22 Show! Music Core, on May 23, and SBS's Inkigayo on May 24. In the second week, Itzy performed the song on four music programs: Mnet's M Countdown on May 28, KBS's Music Bank on May 29, MBC's Show! Music Core on May 30, and concluded promotions on SBS's Inkigayo on May 31.

== Track listing ==
- Digital download and streaming – Remixes
1. "Motto" (English version) – 3:13
2. "Motto" (band version) – 3:48
3. "Motto" (unplugged version) – 2:59
4. "Motto" (instrumental) – 3:13

== Charts ==
Chart performance for "Motto"
Chart (2026)	Peak position
New Zealand Hot Singles (RMNZ)	35
South Korea (Circle)	90
Taiwan (Billboard)	14

== Release history ==
Release history for "Motto"
Region	Date	Format	Version	Label
Various	May 18, 2026	Digital download; streaming	Original	JYP; Republic
Various	May 22, 2026	Digital download; streaming	Remixes	JYP; Republic
