= Victory Boyd =

American singer, songwriter, producer, instrumentalist

Victory Elyse Boyd
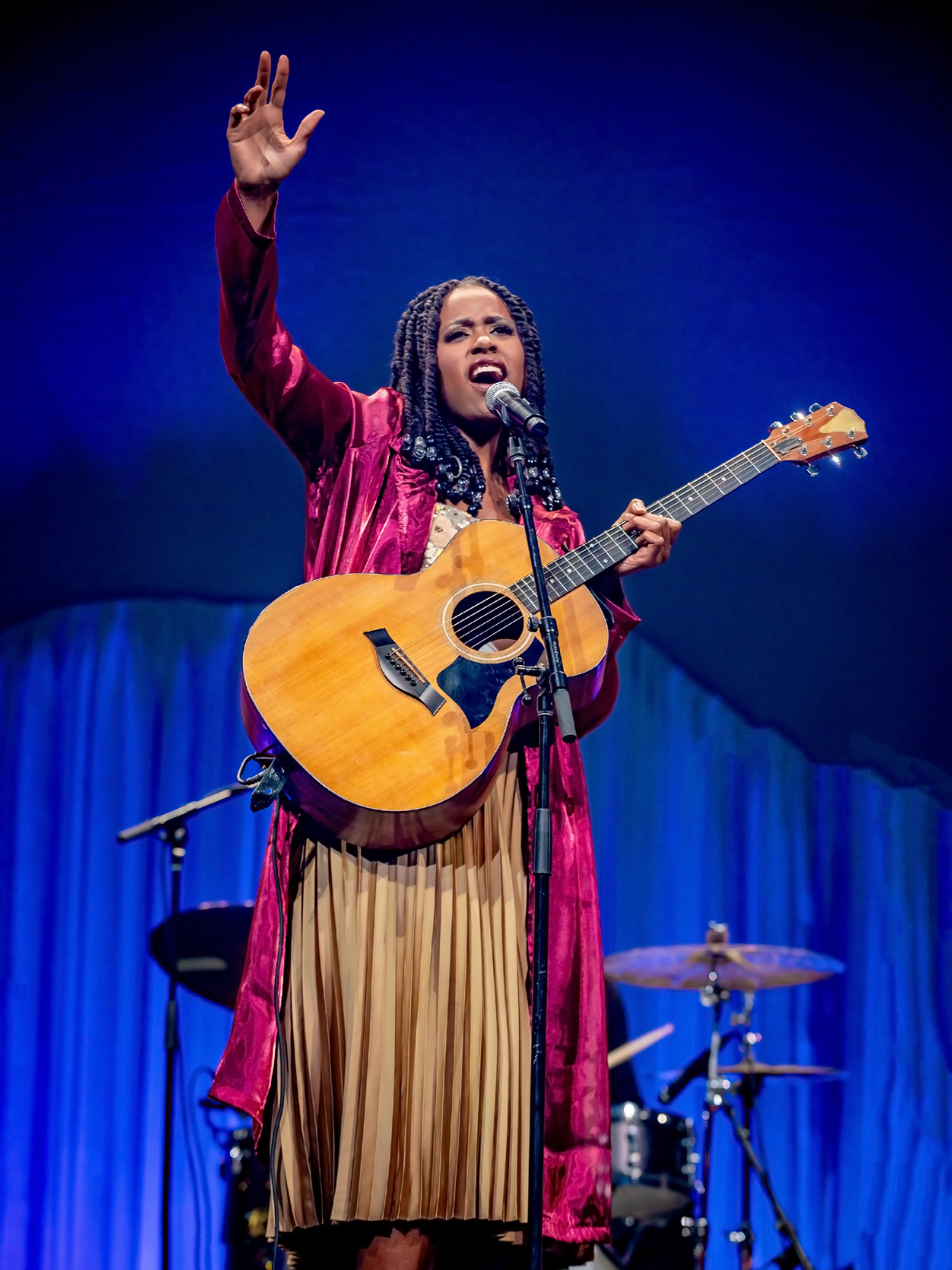
- Born: Detroit, Michigan, United States
- Other name: Victory
- Relatives: Infinity Song (siblings)
- Musical career
- Genres: Folk music; R&B; soul; gospel
- Occupations: Singer; songwriter; producer; instrumentalist
- Labels: Peace Music; Roc Nation

Victory Elyse Boyd is an American singer, songwriter, producer, and instrumentalist, best known for her writing contributions to Kanye West's Jesus Is King and his other gospel projects. She is signed to Roc Nation.

== Career ==
=== Early life ===
Boyd was born into a musical family of eleven: her parents are both musicians, and all eight of her siblings are musicians as well. Her parents founded the Detroit Boys & Girls choir, and Boyd joined the choir at four. After a move to New Jersey at the age of 12, her family began performing at New York City landmarks Grand Central Terminal, Times Square, and Bethesda Fountain at Central Park as The Perfect Blend Music Group, quickly growing a following through viral videos of their performances. After one such performance went viral and was sent to Jay-Z by his friend Jeymes Samuel, Jay-Z signed the entire family to a record deal on label Roc Nation. Initially a member of family band Infinity Song until 2021, Boyd released her solo debut EP in 2017 titled A New Dawn on Roc Nation, featuring a cover of the Stevie Wonder song "Overjoyed".

=== The Broken Instrument, Kanye West, and Glory Hour ===
In 2018, Boyd's cover of "Bridge over Troubled Water" was added to Starbucks' Nation of US Spotify playlist celebrating "songs of community, caring and America from artists we love." Boyd next joined the 2018 Spring campaign for shoe retailer Clarks, before opening for Lauryn Hill at Harlem's Apollo Theater. On June 15, she released her debut album The Broken Instrument (self-written and co-produced alongside 9th Wonder, her father, and Jon Batiste), before supporting Jussie Smollett on his Sum Of My Music Tour around Europe and the United States. In 2019, Kanye West travelled to a free concert in Batesville, Indiana held by Boyd and her siblings Infinity Song to introduce their performance. After reportedly lauding the family as "the future of music" at the concert (reported in a TMZ post that night), West announced the release of his album Jesus Is King. Boyd contributed several gospel songs she had written to West, who included them on his project. In a subsequent interview, Boyd would later credit West for giving her the freedom to write "blatantly-Gospel" music in a mainstream setting (the album sessions for his project) as the motivation for her next album. In 2023, Boyd released gospel album Glory Hour before supporting Lauren Daigle on her Kaleidoscope Tour.

== Legal dispute ==
In 2023, Boyd sued Travis Scott, Scott's label, as well as luxury watch brand Audemars Piguet (who used the song in a promotional campaign) for copyright infringement after discovering Scott's hit collaboration "Telekinesis" used aspects of her 2019 track "Like the Way It Sounds" in the song's chorus without her permission. Boyd claims "Like the Way It Sounds" was brought in demo form to sessions for Kanye West's gospel projects in creation of another song (titled "Ultrasounds" in collaboration with West), but was passed to Scott when it did not make West's projects. While Boyd received credit as a songwriter on the new song in exchange for them using her lyrics in an attempt to resolve the situation prior to the release of Scott's parent album Utopia, Boyd is adamant that her song was intended to be used for gospel music purposes only, and neither Boyd nor her publisher approved the license needed to sample the song.

== Discography ==
=== Studio albums ===
- The Broken Instrument (2018)
- Glory Hour (2023)
- Glory Hour (Live) (2024)
- Christmas Hymns (2025)
- Confessions of a Lonely Girl (2026)

=== Extended Plays ===
- A New Dawn (2017)

=== Guest appearances ===
Title	Year	Artist	Album
"Just Like In The Garden"	2024	Sondae	Pilgrim's Road
"When He Returns"	2024	John Mark McMillan	Non-album single

=== Selected songwriting & production credits ===
Title	Year	Artist	Album
"Closed on Sunday"	2019	Kanye West	Jesus Is King
"Water" (featuring Ant Clemons)	2019	Kanye West	Jesus Is King
"God Is"	2019	Kanye West	Jesus Is King
"Future Sounds / Ultrasounds" (unreleased)	2021	Kanye West	Donda
"Glory (Sierra Canyon)" (unreleased)	2021	Kanye West	Donda
"Future Bounce" (unreleased)	2021	Kanye West	Donda
"Metamorphosis"	2023	Infinity Song	Metamorphosis
"Telekinesis" (featuring SZA & Future)	2023	Travis Scott	Utopia

== Tours ==
=== Supporting ===
- Sum Of My Music Tour (2018)
- The Kaleidoscope Tour (2023)
