= Follow God =

Single by Kanye West

from the album Jesus Is King
- Released: November 8, 2019
- Recorded: August 9 – October 24, 2019
- Genre: Christian hip hop
- Length: 1:45
- Label: GOOD; Def Jam
- Songwriters: Kanye West; Aaron Butts; Bryant Bell; Calvin Eubanks; Curtis Eubanks; Jahmal Gwin
- Producers: Kanye West; BoogzDaBeast; Xcelence

Kanye West singles chronology
"Take Me to the Light" (2019)	"Follow God" (2019)	"Closed on Sunday" (2019)

Music video
- "Follow God" on YouTube

Lyric video
- "Follow God" on YouTube

"Follow God" is a song by American rapper Kanye West from his ninth studio album, Jesus Is King (2019). The song was produced by West, BoogzDaBeast and Xcelence. The producers wrote it alongside Aaron Butts, though the song's sampling of work by Whole Truth led to songwriting credits being listed for Calvin and Curtis Eubanks. It was playlisted to UK mainstream radio by the BBC as the album's lead single on November 8, 2019, through GOOD Music and Def Jam. Around the time of release, the song was the top performing track from Jesus Is King on streaming services. A religious hip hop track, it includes a sample of "Can You Lose by Following God" by Whole Truth, which is chopped up in certain sections. On February 6, 2021, a Dr. Dre remix was leaked from the scrapped Jesus Is King II album.

The lyrics of "Follow God" are about Kanye West's connection with his father, which is in reference to both God and his biological father Ray West, while the meaning of being "Christlike" is questioned by him. The song received generally positive reviews from music critics; many named it the best track on Jesus Is King. Critics appreciated the bouncing beat and Whole Truth sample, and complimented West's rapping flow and pace. The song was awarded Top Gospel Song and Rap/Hip Hop Recorded Song of the Year at the Billboard Music Awards and 51st GMA Dove Awards in 2020, respectively.

Commercially, "Follow God" debuted at number 7 on the US Billboard Hot 100, becoming West's 18th track to reach the top 10 on the chart. The song also reached the top 10 in nine other countries, including Australia, Canada, and the United Kingdom. It was later certified double platinum and gold in the United States and the United Kingdom by the Recording Industry Association of America (RIAA) and British Phonographic Industry (BPI), respectively. The song also received a gold certification in Denmark by IFPI Danmark, while it was awarded this certification in Portugal by Associação Fonográfica Portuguesa (AFP). An accompanying music video was screened on November 6, 2019, and released the following day. It shows Kanye and Ray West drive ATVs in snow in Cody, Wyoming. The video concludes with a message from Kanye about his relationship with Ray West. Kanye West performed the song with the Sunday Service Choir as part of his Sunday Service concerts in 2019.

== Background and development ==
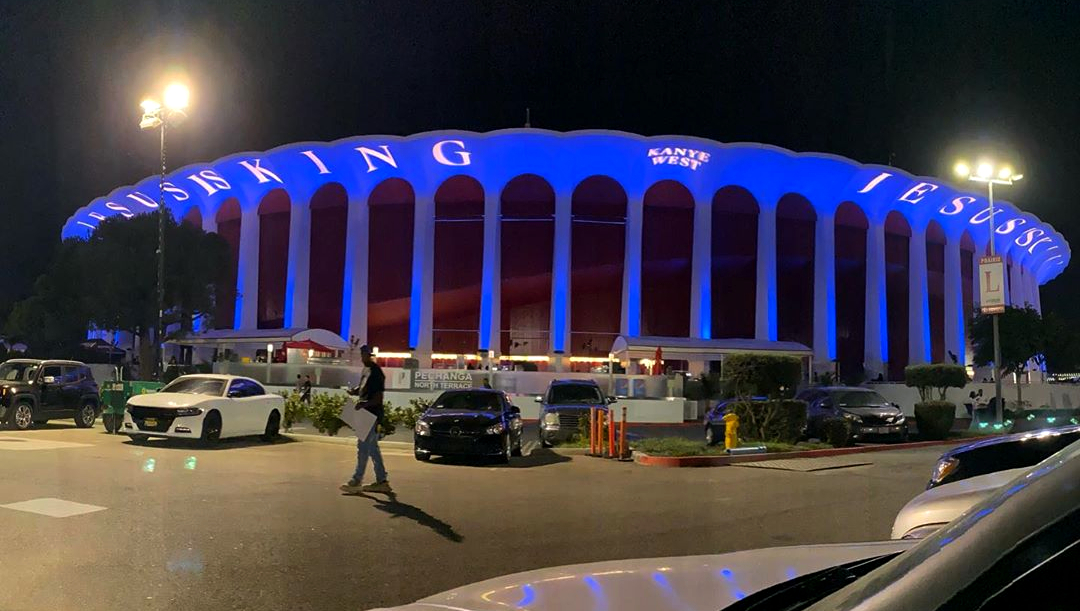
West teased the song in 2019 prior to release, including playing it during a listening party for Jesus Is King at The Forum in the County of Los Angeles.

Kanye West produced "Follow God" with Xcelence and BoogzDaBeast, the latter of which is one of Jesus Is King's lesser-known producers who contributed to six of its tracks. West previously worked with BoogzDaBeast on the 2018 self-titled debut studio album by Kids See Ghosts, a hip hop duo composed of West and Kid Cudi. The song title was first revealed in a revised track listing of Jesus Is King that West's wife Kim Kardashian shared via Twitter on September 27, 2019. West later previewed the track at a listening party for the album at The Forum in the Los Angeles County on October 23 of that year.

The song samples "Can You Lose By Following God" (1969) by gospel band Whole Truth, which was featured on archival record label The Numero Group's 2013 compilation album Good God! Apocryphal Hymns. Though the album was not confirmed to be the sample source, West had often sampled music released through the archival record label in the past, including on his tracks "Bound 2", "Facts", "Ghost Town", and "4th Dimension". Brothers Calvin and Curtis Eubanks received credit as writers on "Follow God" because they contributed backing vocals to "Can You Lose By Following God". The song was co-written by West, Aaron Butts, Xcelence and BoogzDaBeast. "Follow God" was one of the three tracks that caused the release of Jesus Is King to be delayed due to mixing modifications. West collaborator Consequence explained that the song was important to West due to him being "up against the ghost of" his previous tracks such as "Otis", "Good Morning", "Champion" and "Heard 'Em Say". According to Consequence, "Follow God" had "to go somewhere new" and "be mechanically in tune with the people." Consequence said the song "is a dirty version that got cleaned up," which he and West opted for, believing it was an authentic version that "the people are going to gravitate to". West cited "Follow God" as an example of him creating a track "that people never heard before."

== Music and lyrics ==
"Follow God"
An eight-second snippet of the song in which West references being "Christlike" over the chopped up Whole Truth sample.

"Follow God" is a hip hop track which features a chopped up sample of Whole Truth's soul recording "Can You Lose by Following God". It was compared to West's earlier releases which used samples, and his 2016 song "Father Stretch My Hands, Pt. 1". "Follow God" is built around the sample's vocal line, "Father, I stretch/Stretch my hands to You," which begins from the 1:32 mark of the sample. It opens with the sample used as a declaration.

The lyrics are about Kanye's connection with his father, although he references God under this connection as well as Ray West. However, the lyrics are not entirely religious, with the song including Kanye West demonstrating faith in himself. It also speaks of disconnecting from negativity related to social media. West begins his verse with lines about struggling to achieve pureness in a world of sin, while in other lyrics he compares himself to Jesus Christ and Michael Jordan. In "Follow God", West considers what it means to be "Christlike" after an argument with his father. The song concludes with West climaxing the argument by recalling the two of them getting angry at each other, accompanied by a scream from him.

The phrase "what your life like" is repeatedly used as a question by West and was compared to fellow rapper Shotgun Suge's "What's your life like?" phrase. Suge said the phrase was his slogan and that West should acknowledge battle rap culture. A writer from The Source argued that West used the phrase as "a device for introspective contemplation", while Suge used it to "challenge the authenticity of his opponents".

== Release and promotion ==
"Follow God" was released on October 25, 2019, along with West's ninth studio album Jesus Is King, as its third track. On November 5, West chose it as the lead single from Jesus Is King after it became the album's most popular track on streaming services at the time. The song was playlisted by British mainstream radio station BBC Radio 1 on November 8, 2019. It was later released to radio stations in Italy on November 11, and the United States on November 12, 2019.

A lyric video was released for "Follow God" on YouTube on October 26, 2019. On November 1, 2019, West and his gospel group the Sunday Service Choir performed the song during a concert at Bethany Rose Church in Baton Rouge, Louisiana. West performed the track during a surprise appearance at fellow rapper Travis Scott's Astroworld Festival in Houston on November 9, 2019. During a Sunday Service Experience performance of the song at Joel Osteen's Lakewood Church on November 17, West name-dropped American convict Rodney Reed, who Kardashian helped with delaying a court order. West performed the song live as part of a Sunday Service concert in Downtown Los Angeles' Skid Row on December 29, 2019.

== Critical reception ==
"Follow God" was well received by most music critics; a number of them viewed it as the best track on Jesus Is King. (Note: Music critics who cited "Follow God" as the best track on Jesus Is King included Dean Van Nguyen of The Guardian, Jordan Bassett of NME, and Ross Horton of The Line of Best Fit. Roisin O'Connor of The Independent and Carl Wilson of Slate viewed it as among the best tracks on the album, while Brian Josephs of Entertainment Weekly said the song had "by-far" the best verse on the album.) Writing for Entertainment Weekly, Brian Josephs called the song West's "most palpable post-Life of Pablo thriller," citing his verse as "a surreal stream-of-conscious sprint". Wren Graves of Consequence of Sound said the song structure is reminiscent of West's "older tricks" and commented, "It's not just the best beat on the album; it's also Kanye at his most lucid and raw." The Atlantic's Spencer Kornhaber likened the "focus and ease" of West's flow to that of Watch the Throne, his 2011 album with fellow rapper Jay-Z. Ross Horton of The Line of Best Fit regarded the track as "a sickening reminder of how good Ye has been in the past", highlighting its "bulletproof beats, scratchy rapid-fire rapping," and "tight rhymes".

Jordan Bassett of NME called the song "pounding" and likened its "bouncing beat" to music from West's 2018 album Ye. Neil Z. Yeung from AllMusic cited the "slapping beat" as among Jesus Is King's "true power" which he felt was in West's "meticulous studio tinkering". Rolling Stone's Brendan Klinkenberg described the Whole Truth sample as "neck-snappingly good" with "the kind of textured punch that, still, only West seems capable of." In The Independent, Roisin O'Connor appreciated the sample's "cool, funk-inflected" groove, and said the song has "some of West's sharpest bars delivered in a strangely deadpan style." Dean Van Nguyen of The Guardian wrote that the "lean soul sample" recalled West's 2013 single "Bound 2", while Chicago Tribune's Greg Kot commented that it evoked West's earlier music which had a "knack for astutely reviving and recontextualizing snippets of soul 'dusties.'" In a review for Clash, Will Rosebury felt the Whole Truth sample complimented the "incredible" song's thumping drums.

Rawiya Kameir of Pitchfork wrote that despite Jesus Is King lacking the vulnerability which made West "a uniquely compelling artist," "Follow God" was an exception because it "prompts consideration, however shallow, of what it means to be 'Christlike.'" In her review of the album, Phoebe Luckhurst of the Evening Standard regarded "Follow God" as "the best of a fairly poor bunch." Exclaim!'s Joey Chini viewed it as the album's "only slapper" and said although being "painfully short", it is "a return to form" for West and "took the record in the right direction". On the other hand, Andrew R. Chow of Time was critical of West for not developing a metaphor about God, and called the song "a reject" from GOOD Music president Pusha T's 2018 album Daytona.

=== Accolades ===
Complex placed "Follow God" at number 49 in its list of the Top Songs of 2019. Eric Skelton from the publication said the track was a reminder of West's "enduring musical gifts" and its "vintage Ye" production "should please anyone who still pines for a return of the 'old Kanye.'" "Follow God" ranked as Australian radio station Triple J's 87th most popular song of 2019. The song was nominated for the Best Gospel/Inspirational Award at the 20th BET Awards in 2020, though ultimately lost to Kirk Franklin's single "Just for Me" (2019). At the 2020 Billboard Music Awards, the song won the Top Gospel Song award over fellow album tracks "Closed on Sunday", "On God" and "Selah". The song received a nomination for the award of Top Christian Song at the same ceremony. At the 51st GMA Dove Awards in 2020, "Follow God" was awarded Rap/Hip Hop Recorded Song of the Year.

== Music video ==
=== Background ===
The music video for the track was directed by Jake Schreier and filmed at West's ranch in Cody, Wyoming. It is the first video that Kanye and Ray West have appeared in together. Kardashian shared a preview of the music video via her Instagram stories on November 6, 2019, although the release date for it was unknown at the time. Kanye West rented a Burberry store in New York the same day for a private screening of the video. The visual was played back multiple times in a room at the store. Fellow rappers Tyler, the Creator and ASAP Rocky attended the screening. The video was released on YouTube on November 7, 2019; West shared it simultaneously on Twitter. "Follow God" became the first song from Jesus Is King to receive a music video.

=== Synopsis ===
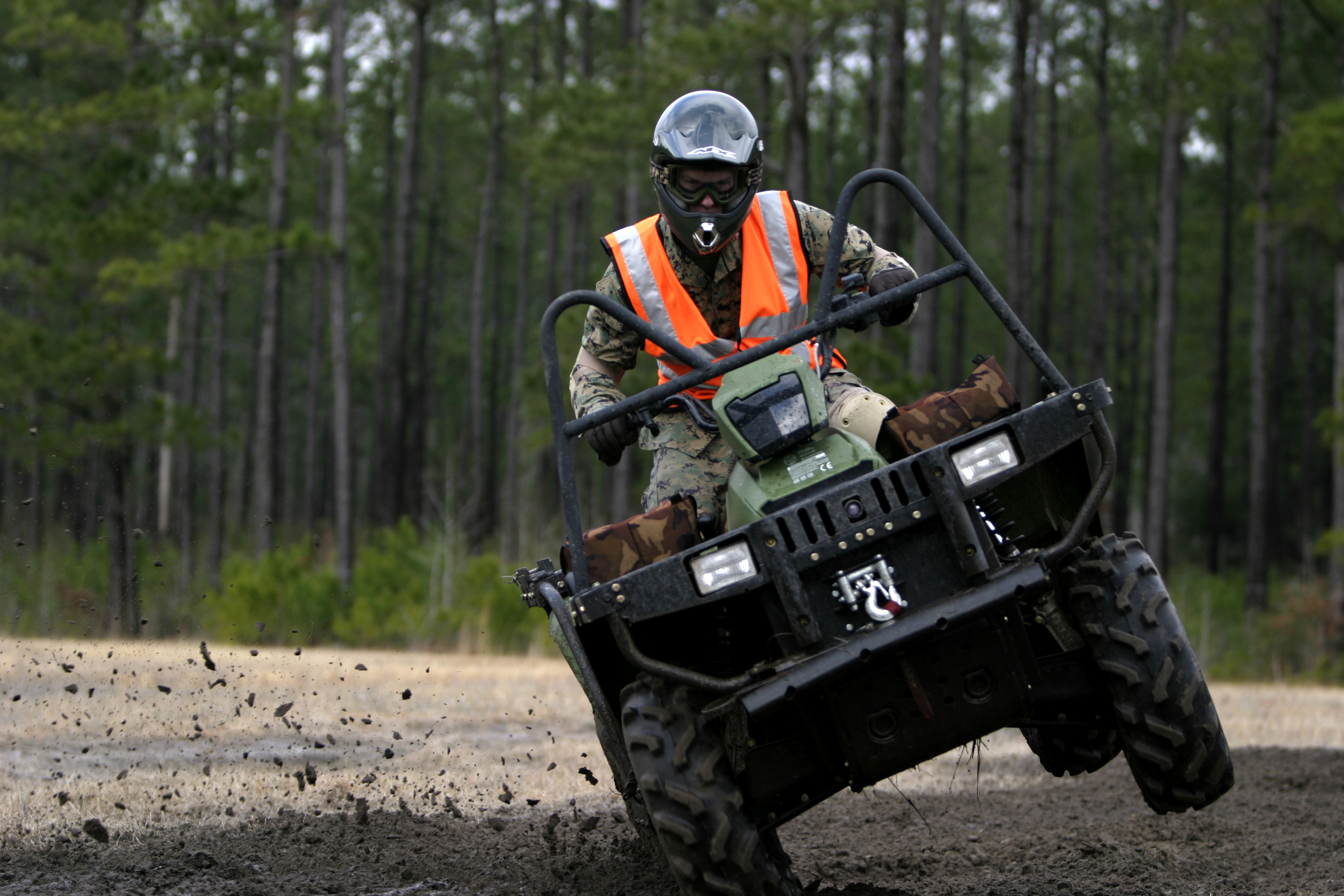
Kanye and Ray West drive ATVs throughout the video.

The music video opens with a scene of Kanye and Ray West walking on snow. Pastor Kerwin B. Lee delivers a voiceover, asking: "What does it really mean to follow God?". He describes how Kanye and others feel fear when they first walk in the snow from the perspective of God looking at his children. The outfit worn by Kanye consists of an orange hoodie, white vest, brown gloves, and thermal trousers. The Wests drive around in all-terrain vehicles (ATVs) in the music video. After initially driving around in a relatively large ATV, the two of them later change to a larger one for transport and use the vehicle for doing donuts. The Wests are also shown dancing and Kanye mimes his own scream. The visual ends with white text displayed over a blue background. The message explains it took Kanye 42 years to realize that his father is his best friend.

=== Reception ===
Craig Jenkins of Vulture wrote that "Follow God" continued a streak from 2011's "Otis" and 2007's "Flashing Lights" as West's "most striking" videos that were also filmed in cars. Jenkins found the setting symbolic for the Wests due to Ray recalling a time when his children never saw snow, and Kanye now owning ranch lands that Ray's grandchildren can call their "backyard". Spin's Tosten Burks said Kanye and Ray's connection in the video made it "one of the more charming things Kanye has released in some time". Thom Waite of Dazed felt it showed that Kanye's relationship with Ray was "running a bit more smoothly" than what the song's lyrics suggested. The music video received over 1.6 million views on YouTube following its first 14 hours of release. As of January 2024 the music video has 55 million views.

== Commercial performance ==
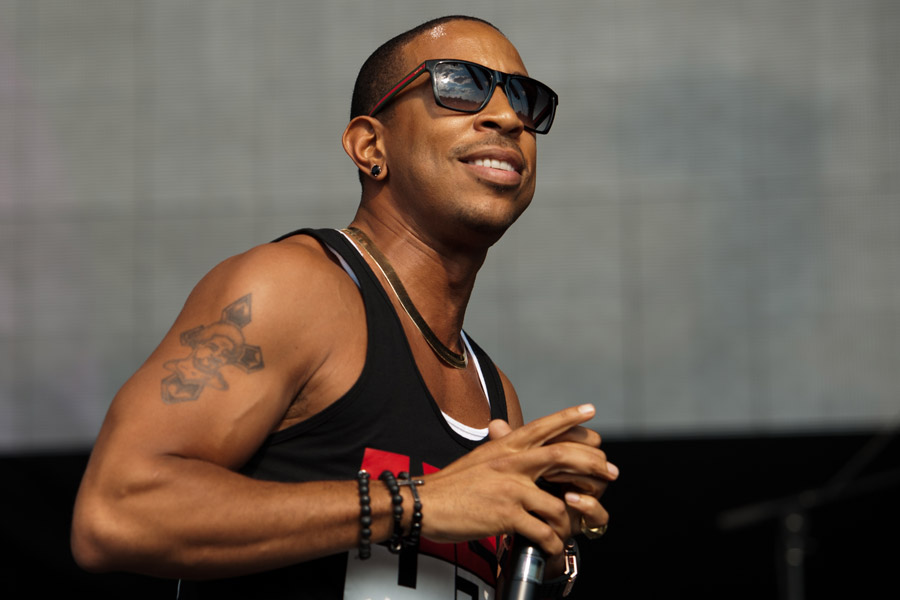
The song marked West's 18th single to reach the top 10 on the US Billboard Hot 100, tying him with Ludacris as the rapper with the fifth-most top-10s.

Following the release of Jesus Is King, "Follow God" debuted at number seven on the US Billboard Hot 100, making it the highest charting track from the album on the chart. It became West's 18th song to reach the top 10 of the chart, and his 8th to debut in the top 10. West tied Ludacris for the fifth-most top 10 singles on the chart among rappers, while also extending his span of top 10s to over 15 years, from 2004 to 2019. The track accumulated 34 million streams and sold 8,000 digital copies in its first week, and was present on the chart for six weeks.

"Follow God" became West's most successful release on US Christian Songs where it debuted at the top of the chart, ending Lauren Daigle's 66-week run at number one with "You Say". In total, the track remained at the summit of the Christian Songs chart for eight weeks. It topped the US Gospel Songs chart, spending 35 weeks at number one before falling to number two on the issue date of July 11, 2020, being replaced by West's own single "Wash Us in the Blood". The track also reached the summit of the US Christian Streaming Songs, Christian Digital Song Sales, Gospel Streaming Songs, and Gospel Digital Song Sales charts. On the US Hot R&B/Hip-Hop Songs chart, the track debuted at number three and remained on the chart for a total of six weeks. On January 10, 2024, the song was certified double platinum by the Recording Industry Association of America (RIAA) for track-equivalent sales of 2,000,000 units in the US.

Elsewhere, "Follow God" peaked at number six on the Canadian Hot 100 and New Zealand Singles Chart. In Australia, it became the highest-charting track from Jesus Is King, entering the ARIA Singles Chart at number seven. On the UK Singles Chart, the song debuted at number six, with first-week sales of 32,806 units. This gave West his 20th top 10 single in the United Kingdom, and it spent six weeks on the chart. On November 22, 2024, "Follow God" was certified gold by the British Phonographic Industry (BPI) for sales of 400,000 units in the UK. The track charted in the top 10 in Estonia, Ireland, Latvia, Lithuania and Slovakia. It charted at number 11 and 12 on the Danish Track Top-40 and Icelandic Singles Chart, respectively. On September 19, 2023, "Follow God" was awarded a gold certification by IFPI Danmark for selling 45,000 units in Denmark. In Norway, the track debuted at number 13 on the Norwegian Topp 40 Singles chart. The track also reached the top 20 in the Czech Republic, Portugal, Sweden, and Switzerland. On May 13, 2022, it was certified gold by the Associação Fonográfica Portuguesa (AFP) for shelving 5,000 units in Portugal.

== In popular culture ==
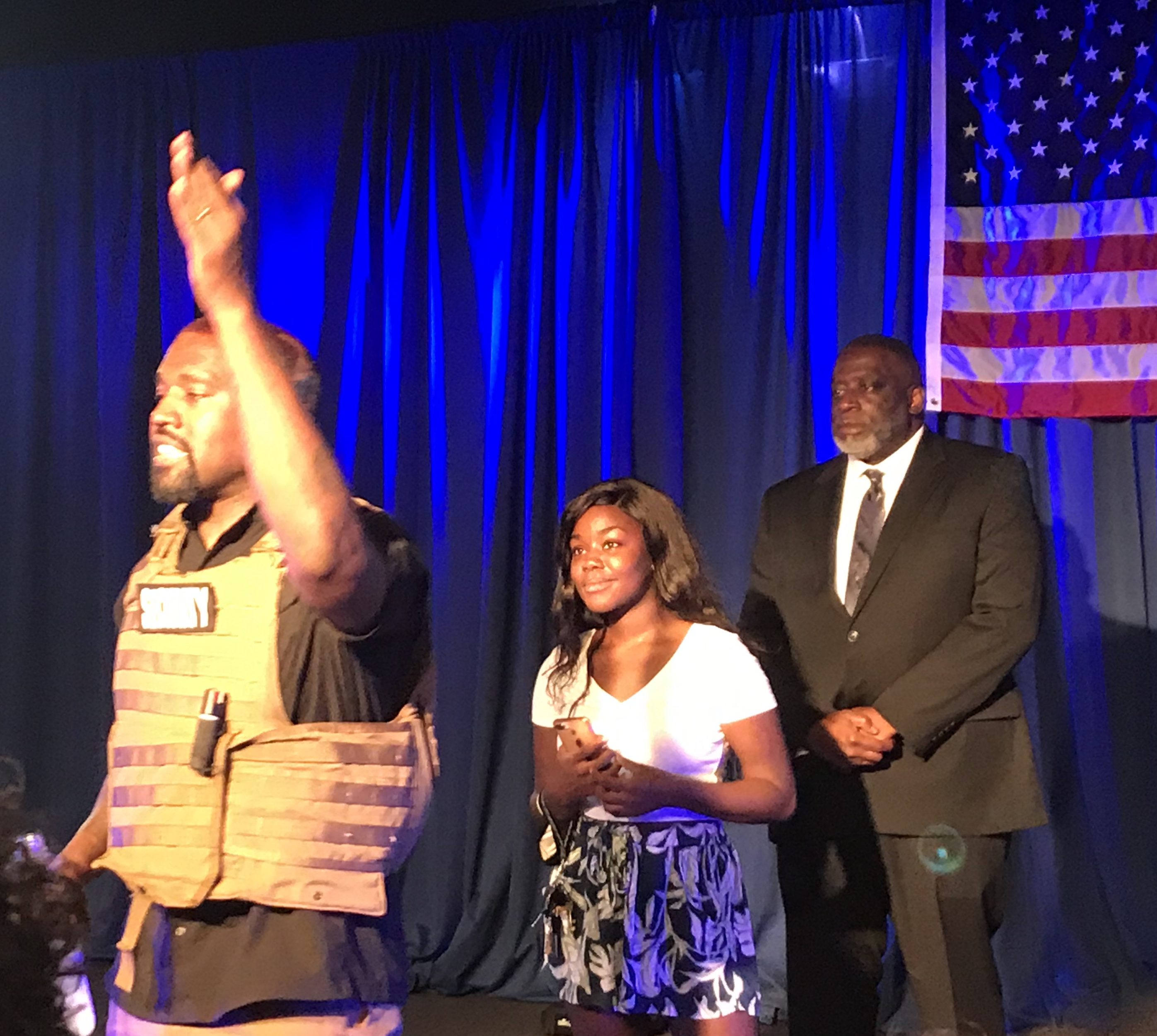
The song was referenced in an endorsement for West's 2020 presidential campaign.

After Jesus Is King's release, the song was frequently viewed as the album's best track by users of Twitter. According to a number of them, it is the only good track on the album. Pusha T announced his wife Virginia Williams' pregnancy in a freestyle rap over "Follow God" shared via Instagram on December 9, 2019. Jay-Z placed the track among a playlist of his favourite songs of 2019, which was uploaded by him to Tidal on December 19 of that year. During a round of the primetime Jeopardy! tournament Jeopardy! The Greatest of All Time on January 15, 2020, host Alex Trebek gave the clue for a question about West's discography by stating, "'Follow God' and 'Closed on Sunday' are tracks on this 2019 Kanye West album." The contestants Ken Jennings, Brad Rutter and James Holzhauer failed to correctly answer with Jesus Is King. On August 12, 2020, Merrill mayor Derek Woellner endorsed West's 2020 presidential campaign and admitted that he was voting for him due to West being "the guy that says follow god," while Woellner shared a link to the song's music video as part of his endorsement.

== Credits and personnel ==
Credits adapted from Tidal.

- Kanye West – producer, songwriter
- BoogzDaBeast – producer, songwriter
- Xcelence – producer, songwriter
- Aaron Butts – songwriter
- Calvin Eubanks – songwriter
- Curtis Eubanks – songwriter
- Mike Dean – mastering, mixing
- Jess Jackson – mixing
- Andrew Drucker – recording engineer
- Josh Bales – recording engineer
- Josh Berg – recording engineer
- Randy Urbanski – recording engineer

== Charts ==
=== Weekly charts ===
Chart performance for "Follow God"
Chart (2019)	Peak position
Australia (ARIA)	7
Austria (Ö3 Austria Top 40)	29
Belgium (Ultratip Bubbling Under Flanders)	1
Belgium Urban (Ultratop Flanders)	13
Belgium (Ultratip Bubbling Under Wallonia)	28
Canada Hot 100 (Billboard)	6
Czech Republic Singles Digital (ČNS IFPI)	18
Denmark (Tracklisten)	11
Estonia (Eesti Tipp-40)	9
France (SNEP)	54
Greece International Digital Singles (IFPI)	22
Hungary (Stream Top 40)	11
Iceland (Tónlistinn)	12
Ireland (IRMA)	5
Italy (FIMI)	53
Latvia (LAIPA)	4
Lithuania (AGATA)	4
Netherlands (Single Top 100)	40
New Zealand (Recorded Music NZ)	6
Norway (VG-lista)	13
Portugal (AFP)	14
Singapore (RIAS)	28
Slovakia Singles Digital (ČNS IFPI)	8
Sweden (Sverigetopplistan)	18
Switzerland (Schweizer Hitparade)	14
UK Singles (Official Charts)	6
UK Hip Hop/R&B (Official Charts)	2
US Billboard Hot 100	7
US Hot Christian Songs (Billboard)	1
US Gospel Songs (Billboard)	1
US Hot R&B/Hip-Hop Songs (Billboard)	3
US Rhythmic Airplay (Billboard)	17
US Rolling Stone Top 100	2

=== Year-end charts ===
2019 year-end chart performance for "Follow God"
Chart (2019)	Position
Belgium Urban (Ultratop Flanders)	95
US Christian Songs (Billboard)	21
US Gospel Songs (Billboard)	2

2020 year-end chart performance for "Follow God"
Chart (2020)	Position
US Christian Songs (Billboard)	4
US Gospel Songs (Billboard)	1

2021 year-end chart performance for "Follow God"
Chart (2021)	Position
US Gospel Songs (Billboard)	33

== Certifications ==
Certifications and sales for "Follow God"
Region	Certification	Certified units/sales
Denmark (IFPI Danmark)	Gold	45,000^{‡}
New Zealand (RMNZ)	Platinum	30,000^{‡}
Poland (ZPAV)	Gold	25,000^{‡}
Portugal (AFP)	Gold	5,000^{‡}
United Kingdom (BPI)	Gold	400,000^{‡}
United States (RIAA)	2× Platinum	2,000,000^{‡}
^{‡} Sales+streaming figures based on certification alone.
