= God Is =

2019 song by Kanye West

Song by Kanye West

from the album Jesus Is King
- Released: October 25, 2019
- Genre: Gospel
- Length: 3:23
- Label: GOOD; Def Jam
- Songwriters: Kanye West; Warryn Campbell; Timothy Lee McKenzie; Angel Lopez; Federico Vindver; Victory Elyse Boyd; Robert Fryson
- Producers: Kanye West; Warryn Campbell; Labrinth; Angel Lopez; Federico Vindver

Audio
- "God Is" on YouTube

"God Is" is a song by American vocalist and record producer Kanye West from his ninth studio album, Jesus Is King (2019). The song includes additional vocals from Labrinth, who produced it with West, Warryn Campbell, Angel Lopez, and Federico Vindver. The producers also served as songwriters with Victory Elyse Boyd and Robert Fryson. A gospel song, it includes a looped sample of James Cleveland and the Southern California Community Choir's song of the same name. Lyrically, West sings of his dedication to Christianity and representation of God.

"God Is" received lukewarm reviews from music critics, who were moderately positive towards West's vocals. Some praised its gospel theme, while numerous critics commended the production. The song debuted at number 36 on the US Billboard Hot 100, while peaking at numbers four and six on the Gospel Songs and Christian Songs charts, respectively. It reached numbers 39 and 40 on the ARIA Singles Chart and Canadian Hot 100, respectively. The song was certified platinum and gold in the United States and New Zealand by the Recording Industry Association of America and Recorded Music NZ, respectively. An alternate version was recorded by West and Dr. Dre for their collaborative remix album, Jesus Is King Part II.

== Background ==
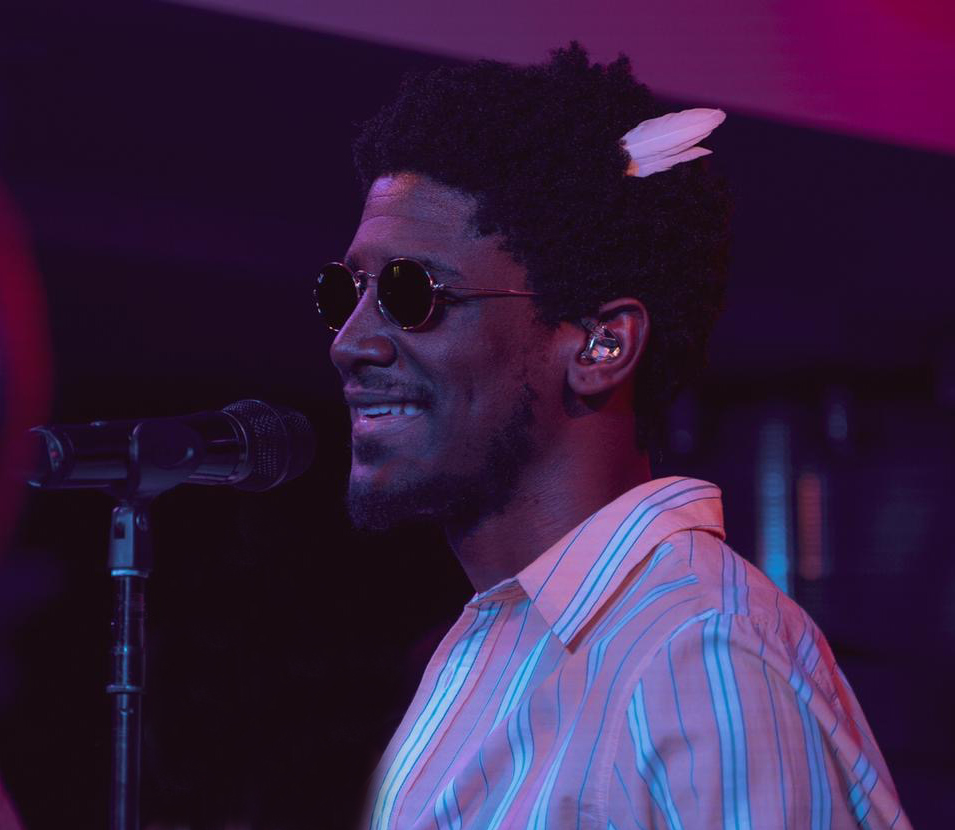
Labrinth contributed production and additional vocals to the song.

In October 2019, British musician Labrinth was invited to a concert of West's gospel group the Sunday Service Choir by a friend. He went in not knowing what to expect then deeply enjoyed the show, noticing that "the vibe was really beautiful". Labrinth told West afterwards that it seemed to lack any ego and instead brought a happy atmosphere for people, including his fellow attendees Sia and Diplo. At the time, the musician was completely unable to disclose any information on Jesus Is King. During the seven years after his debut album Electronic Earth (2012), Labrinth collaborated with musical acts that he appreciated such as West and Beyoncé. Labrinth was invited to work with West on Jesus Is King and admitted the rapper had gone through controversies, while praising the record for him finding "his own redemption and piece" similarly to his musical ideas. In January 2020, Labrinth expressed pride in working with West on the album, seeing him as his most inspirational collaboration in a while. The musician elaborated that he was "taking something away" rather than his usual role of having "to bring something to the table", attributing this to West's ear for talent. Labrinth performs additional vocals on "God Is".

"God Is" was produced by West, Warryn Campbell, Labrinth, Angel Lopez, and Federico Vindver, who co-wrote the song with Victory Elyse Boyd and Robert Fryson. It features a posthumous sample of the song of the same name by gospel singer James Cleveland and the Southern California Community Choir from his 1979 album It's a New Day. Cleveland has been considered influential across his genre for the transition away from traditional black gospel and also incorporating different genres for choirs, and he was also sampled by West associate Chance the Rapper on his album The Big Day in 2019. In September 2023, West's remix album Jesus Is King Part II with record producer and fellow rapper Dr. Dre leaked online, including a strengthened version of "God Is".

== Composition and lyrics ==
Musically, "God Is" is a gospel song, standing among the more traditional work on Jesus Is King. The song features a looped, sped-up soul sample of Cleveland and the Southern California Community Choir's "God Is", which begins from the intro. It also features cinematic sounds and a choral sweep. West sings in an increasingly hoarse voice, going through cracks and strains at points.

In the lyrics of "God Is", West emphasizes his dedication to Christianity and what God represents to him. West expresses his thankfulness to God, including freedom from addiction and being "the strength in the race that I run". He sings of God's faithfulness, rhyming this with how "mir-ac-ulous" the figure is. West delivers a prayer of being lifted up and also sings his praises of Jesus, announcing abandonment of his past idols.

== Release and reception ==
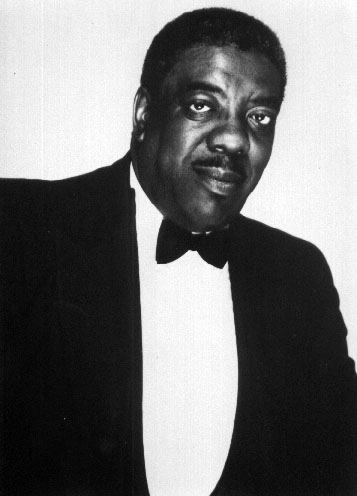
In a number of reviews complimenting the song's production, focus was placed on the sample of "God Is" by James Cleveland (pictured) and the Southern California Community Choir.

On August 29, 2019, West's then-wife Kim Kardashian shared a track list of the album that contained the song. West's ninth studio album Jesus Is King was later released on October 25, including "God Is" as the eighth track. The song was met with lukewarm reviews from music critics, with light praise for West's vocals. Sam C. Mac from Slant Magazine lauded the song as the highlight of the album and saw it as insightful into West's gospel work, noting his pure voice is at its most "cracked and vulnerable" yet over the looped sample of "gospel godhead" Cleveland. Mac said West either sings or "tunefully sermonizes" about his heavy dedication to his faith and the new stage of his life, focusing on the impact of him gracefully delivering religious sentiments and a "plainspoken prayer". He concluded that the song mostly concedes to "a mission, not a show" as agnostics and religious people alike may be moved by West's lyricism through his emotion, reaching his vocal limits and full acceptance of things outside of his control. Writing for God Is in the TV, Aidy James Stevens felt moved by the song in spite of his position of atheism as West's voice cracks "under a powerful outpouring of gratitude" and desired that churches could echo his work rather than fire and brimstone, while also praising the cinematic elements. The staff of No Ripcord quipped that it was the record's "only saving grace", observing that West's voice "genuinely cracks as he calls the Lord" over the soul sample. HipHopDX's Aaron McKrell observed that West describes the Most High, linking this to "his passion for and love for God". In The Herald-Standard, Clint Rhodes highlighted the song as a true embracement of the "mood of the set", offering full glory to God as it paints him as the light in the darkness and references "the ever-flowing fountain [filling] our cup" with goodness.

For Pitchfork, Rawiya Kameir expressed that the gospel and soul blending sample echoes West's early production works for Roc-A-Fella Records. Neil Z. Yeung from AllMusic commended West's sonics for the song's "rapturous choral sweep", while the Chicago Tribune critic Greg Kot picked "the stirring intro" as one of the musical high points of Jesus Is King. Andrew Barker of Variety called it West's purest gospel effort on Jesus Is King, singing "plainspoken praises in a high, increasingly hoarse voice" that feels unexpectedly moving, besides the lack of replay value. Rolling Stone's Brendan Klinkenberg admired the song despite identifying it as not a contender for the album's best, mentioning that West "literally tries to enumerate what God is to him" as his voice strains. Klinkenberg said that while the lyrical content "barely coheres", West's delivery shows the depth of his convictions and he also compared "its straightforward address" to listeners to West's 2014 single "Only One". Will Rosebury from Clash was moderately positive towards the theme of evangelicalism peaking on the song and quipped that it was "immaculately conceived". In a negative review for NME, Jordan Bassett found West rhyming faithfulness with a stretched-out version of miraculous to be "wince-inducing", admitting that this clumsy style was at least funny on his past tracks like "Bound 2" (2013). At Paste, Steven Edelstone wrote off the song's cheesiness that makes around three minutes "feel like an eternity".

== Commercial performance ==
Following the album's release, "God Is" entered the US Billboard Hot 100 at number 36. The song further debuted at numbers four and six on the US Gospel Songs and Christian Songs charts, respectively. It ranked at number 12 on the year-end Hot Gospel Songs chart of 2019, before moving up three positions on the year-end chart for 2020. On July 17, 2026, "God Is" received a platinum certification from the Recording Industry Association of America (RIAA) for amassing 1,000,000 certified units in the United States.

The song experienced similar performance in Canada, charting at number 40 on the Canadian Hot 100. In Australia, it reached number 39 on the ARIA Singles Chart. On June 12, 2025, the song was awarded a gold certification from Recorded Music NZ for shelving 15,000 units in New Zealand. "God Is" further peaked within the top 80 of charts in Lithuania, Portugal, and Slovakia.

== Credits and personnel ==
Credits adapted from Tidal.

- Kanye West – producer, songwriter
- Labrinth – producer, songwriter, additional vocals
- Warryn Campbell – producer, songwriter
- Angel Lopez – producer, songwriter
- Federico Vindver – producer, songwriter
- Victory Elyse Boyd – songwriter
- Robert Fryson – songwriter
- Mike Dean – mastering engineer, mixer
- Jess Jackson – mixer
- Andrew Drucker – recording engineer
- Jamie Peters – recording engineer
- Josh Bales – recording engineer
- Josh Berg – recording engineer
- Randy Urbanski – recording engineer

== Charts ==
=== Weekly charts ===
Chart performance for "God Is"
Chart (2019)	Peak position
Australia (ARIA)	39
Canada Hot 100 (Billboard)	40
France (SNEP)	137
Lithuania (AGATA)	59
Portugal (AFP)	72
Slovakia (Singles Digitál Top 100)	78
UK Hip Hop/R&B (Official Charts)	27
US Billboard Hot 100	36
US Hot Christian Songs (Billboard)	6
US Hot Gospel Songs (Billboard)	4
US Rolling Stone Top 100	14

=== Year-end charts ===
2019 year-end chart performance for "God Is"
Chart (2019)	Position
US Christian Songs (Billboard)	52
US Hot Gospel Songs (Billboard)	12

2020 year-end chart performance for "God Is"
Chart (2020)	Position
US Christian Songs (Billboard)	55
US Hot Gospel Songs (Billboard)	9

== Certifications ==
Certifications for "God Is"
Region	Certification	Certified units/sales
New Zealand (RMNZ)	Gold	15,000^{‡}
United States (RIAA)	Platinum	1,000,000^{‡}
^{‡} Sales+streaming figures based on certification alone.
