= Dem Jointz =

American record producer and songwriter (born 1976)

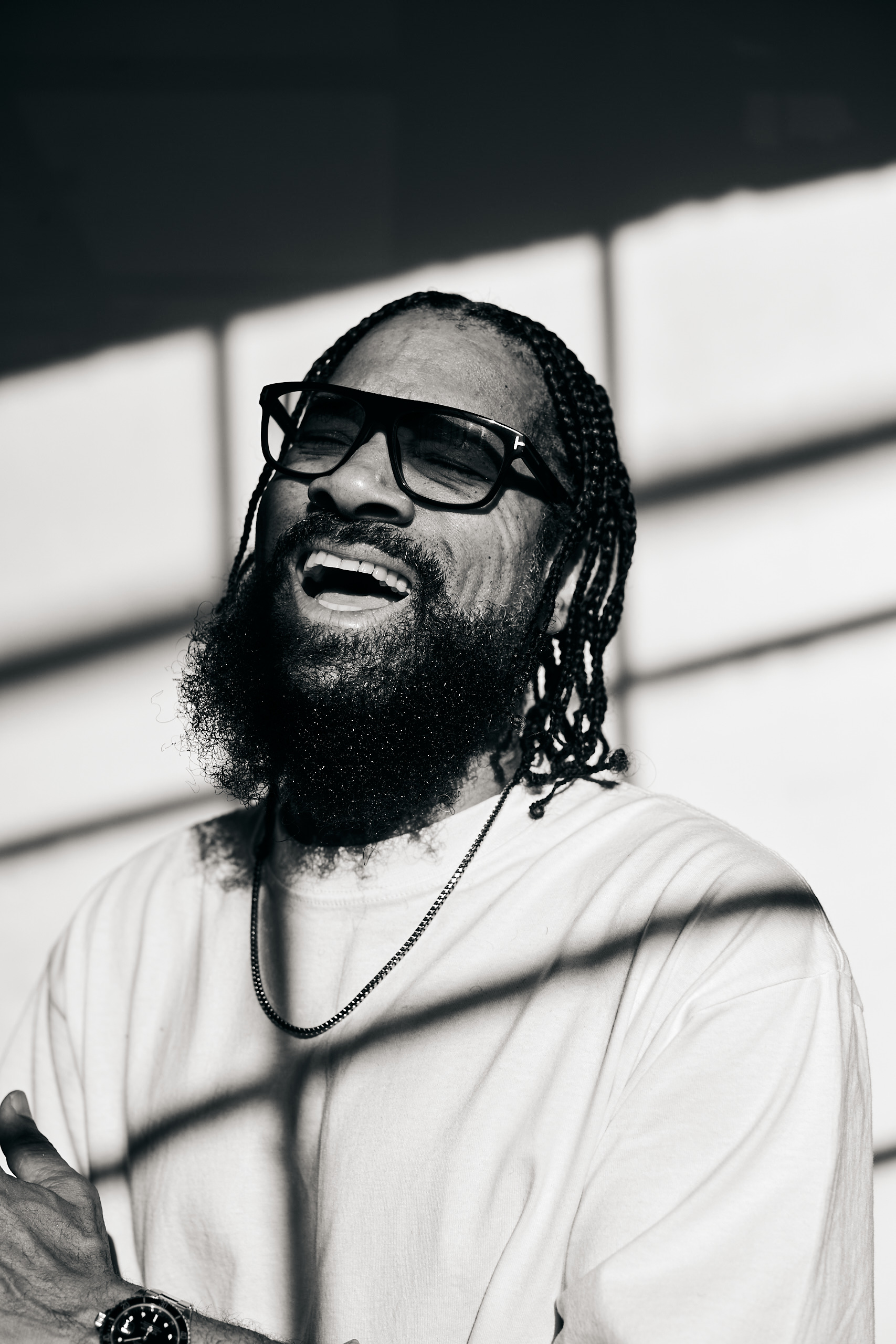
- Dem Jointz in 2025

Background information
- Born: Dwayne Allen Abernathy Jr. July 17, 1976 (age 50)
- Origin: Compton, California, U.S.
- Genres: Hip hop; R&B; pop; K-pop
- Occupations: Record producer; songwriter; singer
- Labels: Aftermath; U Made Us What We Are
- Member of: Read the PDF; The ICU

Dwayne Allen Abernathy Jr. (born July 17, 1976), known professionally as Dem Jointz, is an American record producer, songwriter and singer. He has been credited with production work for artists including Kanye West, Rihanna, Anderson .Paak, Eminem, Snoop Dogg, and Chris Brown.

He served as in-house talent for Dr. Dre's Aftermath Entertainment in 2015, during which he produced four tracks on Dre's third album, Compton (2015). That same year, he produced several tracks on Janet Jackson's Billboard 200-number one album, Unbreakable (2015). Also in 2015, he began producing his first K-pop songs for SM Entertainment, marking a long-term collaboration between him and the label's artists, particularly NCT 127, Red Velvet, Exo, and Aespa, among others. He has since branched out to other K-pop artists from other labels, including BTS, Jennie, Itzy, Ive, and Nmixx.

His record label, U Made Us What We Are, was founded in 2015 and has signed artists including Maryland-based rapper K.A.A.N., gospel singer Keedron Bryant, and his spouse, singer Stalone. He formed the supergroup Read the PDF with fellow Aftermath producers, Mr. Porter and Focus... in 2022.

He has won a Grammy Award from two nominations.

== Early life ==
Dem Jointz was born on July 17, 1976, in Compton, California. He was inclined to music at an early age, playing drums in his local church. Dem Jointz has spoken openly about the challenges of pursuing a career in music, particularly in the context of family expectations around stability, education, and traditional professions. He initially enrolled in college with the intention of becoming an architect but eventually left school to focus on music. Early in his career, he sold beats for relatively modest sums, including $800 to a group called The Comrades, which reinforced his confidence that music could be a sustainable profession. During this period, he balanced his musical pursuits with regular employment, including a position at AT&T Wireless, before committing to music full-time following his termination in 2005. Growing up navigating a duality in his environment, being exposed to both street life and church influences. His father, who transitioned from gang involvement to becoming a minister, played a significant role in shaping his upbringing. This background had a lasting impact on Dem Jointz, with music serving as his cornerstone. He developed his musical skills early, playing drums in church and rapping behind the scenes.

== Career ==
Prior to fully committing to music, Dem Jointz worked at a telecommunications company. In 2005, he was unexpectedly fired, which motivated him to pursue music seriously.

In 2015 he was recruited as an in-house producer for Dr. Dre’s Aftermath Entertainment. That same year, he contributed to four tracks on Dre's third album, Compton (2015), which featured an all-star lineup including Snoop Dogg, Kendrick Lamar, and Eminem.

In 2015, he also co-produced several tracks on Janet Jackson's Unbreakable, which debuted at No. 1 on the Billboard 200. Over the years, he went on to work with Kanye West, Rihanna, Christina Aguilera, Anderson .Paak, Eminem, and Brandy, among many others. His contributions to Kanye West's Donda (2021) and Anderson .Paak's Ventura (2019) earned him multiple Grammy nominations and two Grammy Awards.

Dem Jointz founded his own record label, U Made Us What We Are, in 2015. The label was created to support and develop emerging talent.

Around the same time, Dem Jointz began making waves in the K-pop industry. His first major K-pop placement came with Red Velvet’s "Don't U Wait No More" from their debut studio album, The Red (2015). The success of the track resulted in further collaborations with SM Entertainment, leading to a long-term partnership with the powerhouse label. He has since produced major hits for EXO, NCT 127, Aespa, BTS, TXT, and IVE. NCT 127's "Cherry Bomb" was chosen by Billboard and Idolator as one of the best K-pop songs of 2017. EXO's "Obsession" was named K-Pop Song of the Year by Billboard, while Aespa's "Supernova" dominated the charts for 11 weeks at No. 1 and won Song of the Year at the Korean MAMA Awards.

Abernathy contributed production and backing vocals to West's albums Donda (2021) and Donda 2 (2022), as well as on his 2020 single "Nah Nah Nah".

== Producer tag ==
Abernathy's productions can be identified by his "Incoming!" producer tag, which can be heard in the beginning of his productions—e.g., Kanye West's "Nah Nah Nah" and NCT 127's "Sticker". He also uses the tag "Now, the breakdown" before the bridge of many songs, including Taeyeon's "Something New" and Lee Chaeyeon's "Hush Rush".

== Personal life ==
On November 6, 2021, Dem Jointz announced on Instagram that he's engaged to his partner, Stalone, a Grammy-winning vocalist.

== Discography ==
Partial list of writer & producer credits
Year	Title	Album	Artist(s)
2011	"Cockiness (Love It)"	Talk That Talk	Rihanna, Candice Pillay, Shondrae "Mr. Bangladesh" Crawford, Fenty
2012	"Hottest Girl in the World"	Evolution	JLS
2012	"Dessert"	Evolution	JLS
2012	"All The Way"	Evolution	JLS
2012	"Gotta Try It"	Evolution	JLS
2012	"Put It Down"	Two Eleven	Brandy, Chris Brown
2012	"Let Me Go"	Two Eleven	Brandy
2012	"What You Need"	Two Eleven	Brandy
2012	"Lotus Intro"	Lotus	Christina Aguilera, Candice Pillay, Alexander Grant
2012	"Make the World Move"	Lotus	Christina Aguilera, CeeLo Green
2012	"Circles"	Lotus	Christina Aguilera
2012	"Shut Up"	Lotus	Christina Aguilera
2013	"Call Me Crazy"	Call Me Crazy, But...	Sevyn Streeter, written by Amber Streeter, Taylor Parks
2013	"Feel Like Party'n"	Chase Dreams	Kalin & Myles
2014	"Phuq Da World"	Vuck You	Vina Vuna
2014	"Friends & Lovers"	Friends & Lovers	Marsha Ambrosius
2014	"Neva Been Scared"	Sing Pray Love, Vol. 1: Sing	Kelly Price
2015	"Unbreakable"	Unbreakable	Janet Jackson
2015	"Burnitup!"	Unbreakable	Janet Jackson
2015	"Dammn Baby"	Unbreakable	Janet Jackson
2015	"Shoulda Known Better"	Unbreakable	Janet Jackson
2015	"2 B Loved"	Unbreakable	Janet Jackson
2015	"Don't U Wait No More"	The Red	Red Velvet
2015	"Genocide"	Compton	Dr. Dre & Kendrick Lamar
2015	"Medicine Man"	Compton	Dr. Dre, Eminem, Candice Pillay and Anderson .Paak
2015	"Deep Water"	Compton	Dr. Dre, Kendrick Lamar and Justus
2015	"Satisfiction"	Compton	Dr. Dre, Snoop Dogg, Marsha Ambrosius and King Mez
2015	"Yellow Canary"	dumblonde	Dumblonde
2015	"Party 4 da Low"	The High EP	Candice Pillay
2015	"Consistent"	Shoulda Been There Pt. 1	Sevyn Streeter
2015	"Right Here Right Now"	Right Here, Right Now	Jordin Sparks, Dwayne Abernathy, and James Fauntleroy
2015	"1000"	Right Here, Right Now	Jordin Sparks, James "J-Doe" Smith
2015	"All In A Days Work"	DK3	Danity Kane
2016	"Silicon Valley"	Malibu	Anderson .Paak
2016	"Groovy Tony / Eddie Kane"	Blank Face LP	ScHoolboy Q
2016	"Cloud 9"	Ex'Act	Exo
2017	"Facts"	All Things Work Together	Lecrae
2017	"Cherry Bomb"	Cherry Bomb	NCT 127
2018	"Sho Nuff"	Planet	Tech N9ne
2018	"Same Damn Thing"	Planet	Tech N9ne
2018	"Something New"	Something New	Taeyeon
2018	"Who R U?"	Oxnard	Anderson .Paak
2018	"Brother's Keeper"	Oxnard	Anderson .Paak, Pusha T
2018	"Taste"	RBB	Red Velvet
2019	"Obsession"	Obsession	Exo
2019	"Ya Ya Ya"	Obsession	Exo
2019	"Temporary Lover"	Indigo	Chris Brown, Lil Jon
2020	"Nah Nah Nah"	Non-album singles	Kanye West, DaBaby, 2 Chainz
2020	"Wash Us in the Blood"	Non-album singles	Kanye West, Travis Scott
2020	"2YA2YAO!"	Timeless	Super Junior
2020	"Kick It"	Neo Zone	NCT 127
2020	"Punch"	Neo Zone	NCT 127
2020	"Never Love Again"	Music to Be Murdered By	Eminem
2020	"Outro: Dream Routine"	NCT 2020 Resonance	NCT
2021	"Don't Call Me"	Don't Call Me	Shinee
2021	"Right Now"	Loveholic	NCT 127
2021	"Life of the Party"	Donda	Kanye West, André 3000
2021	"Jail"	Donda	Kanye West, Jay-Z
2021	"Believe What I Say"	Donda	Kanye West
2021	"Keep My Spirit Alive"	Donda	Kanye West, Westside Gunn, Conway the Machine
2021	"New Again"	Donda	Kanye West
2021	"Jail pt 2"	Donda	Kanye West, DaBaby, Marilyn Manson
2021	"Keep My Spirit Alive pt 2"	Donda	Kanye West, Westside Gunn, Conway the Machine, KayCyy
2021	"Sticker"	Sticker	NCT 127
2021	"Universe (Let's Play Ball)"	Universe	NCT U
2021	"Fallin Up"	Grand Theft Auto Online: The Contract	Dr. Dre, Cocoa Sarai, Thurz
2021	"Diamond Mind"	Grand Theft Auto Online: The Contract	Dr. Dre, Ty Dolla Sign, Nipsey Hussle
2022	"Step Back"	Non-album singles	Got the Beat
2022	"City of Gods"	Donda 2	Fivio Foreign, Kanye West, Alicia Keys
2022	"Too Easy"	Donda 2	Kanye West
2022	"Tank"	Ad Mare	Nmixx
2022	"Arcade"	Glitch Mode	NCT Dream
2022	"Run BTS"	Proof	BTS
2022	"What If..."	Jack in the Box	J-Hope
2022	"Use This Gospel (Remix)"	God Did	DJ Khaled, Kanye West, Eminem
2022	"Eyes On You"	Eyes On You	Kangta
2022	"Time Lapse"	2 Baddies	NCT 127
2022	"Designer"	2 Baddies	NCT 127
2022	"In My Bag"	One Bad Night	Jamie
2022	"Nvrlnd"	Non-album singles	Yng Wmxn, Anisa
2022	"6 Feet"	Non-album singles	EastSide K-Boy, Problem, Dave East
2022	"Hush Rush"	Hush Rush	Lee Chaeyeon
2022	"Wanna Fall in Love"	Non-album singles	Stalone
2022	"Selfish"	Selfish	YooA
2022	"Have a Nice Day"	Snoop, Cube, 40, $hort	Mount Westmore
2023	"Stamp on It"	Stamp on It	Got the Beat
2023	"Ay-Yo"	Ay-Yo	NCT 127
2023	"Skyscraper"	Ay-Yo	NCT 127
2023	"Juice"	Hard	Shinee
2023	"Regret It"	Exist	Exo
2023	"Dirty Dancing (Dem Jointz Remix)"	The Block Revisited	New Kids on the Block & Seventeen
2023	"Parade"	Fact Check	NCT 127
2024	"Heya (해야)"	Ive Switch	Ive
2024	"Supernova"	Armageddon	Aespa
2024	"Essa Hoisa"	AG! Calling	Atarashii Gakko!
2024	"Trouble"	The Death of Slim Shady (Coup de Grâce)	Eminem
2024	"Road Rage"	The Death of Slim Shady (Coup de Grâce)	Eminem, Dem Jointz, Sly Pyper
2024	"Guilty Conscience 2"	The Death of Slim Shady (Coup de Grâce)	Eminem
2024	"Sickuhh"	Fe3O4: Stick Out	Nmixx, Kid Milli
2024	"Sexy in the Air"	Eternal	Taemin
2024	"Because I Love You"	Non-album singles	Halle Bailey
2024	"Gold"	Gold	Itzy
2024	"Forty One Winks"	The Star Chapter: Sanctuary	Tomorrow X Together
2024	"Zip Zip Zip"	Youth Never Die	Dxmon
2025	"With the IE (Way Up)"	Ruby	Jennie
2025	"ExtraL"	Ruby	Jennie, Doechii
2025	"Filter"	Ruby	Jennie
2025	"Golden Recipe"	Fe3O4: Forward	Nmixx
2025	"There They Go"	Uncut Gem	KiiiKiii
2025	"BTG"	Uncut Gem	KiiiKiii
2025	"Access"	Magic Man 2	Jackson Wang
2025	"Buck" (feat. Diljit Dosanjh)	Magic Man 2	Jackson Wang
2025	"GBAD"	Magic Man 2	Jackson Wang
2025	"Battitude"	This Is For	Twice
2025	"N the Front"	The X	Monsta X
2025	"Chan-Ran"	I Did It	IDID
2025	"Step It Up"	I Did It	IDID
2025	"Tunnel Vision"	Tunnel Vision	Itzy
2025	"Tiger"	Non-album singles	The Boyz
2025	"Stay"	Eternal White	WayV
2026	"Force"	Revive+	An Yu-jin of Ive
2026	"Rock Solid" (feat. Anderson .Paak)	Non-album singles	Taeyong
2026	"WDA (Whole Different Animal)" (feat. G-Dragon)	Lemonade	Aespa
2026	"PARTY b4 the PARTY"	World Scout: The Final Piece	Saint Satine
2026	"Flashing Light"	K-POPS! (Music from and inspired by K-POPS! Motion Picture)	Crush and Anderson .Paak
2026	"Caution"	K-POPS! (Music from and inspired by K-POPS! Motion Picture)	Nmixx and Anderson .Paak
2026	"Aftertaste"	K-POPS! (Music from and inspired by K-POPS! Motion Picture)	Dean and Anderson .Paak
2026	"PITC (Party In the Corner)"	K-POPS! (Music from and inspired by K-POPS! Motion Picture)	Hongjoong Kim, Anderson .Paak and Jay Park
2026	"Fire with Fire"	K-POPS! (Music from and inspired by K-POPS! Motion Picture)	Lngshot
2026	"International"	K-POPS! (Music from and inspired by K-POPS! Motion Picture)	Soyeon and Anderson .Paak
2026	"Keychain"	K-POPS! (Music from and inspired by K-POPS! Motion Picture)	Aespa and Anderson .Paak
2026	"One More Dance"	K-POPS! (Music from and inspired by K-POPS! Motion Picture)	Joshua and Corbyn Besson
2026	"Wildcard"	K-POPS! (Music from and inspired by K-POPS! Motion Picture)	Kevin Woo
2026	"Just One Bite"	K-POPS! (Music from and inspired by K-POPS! Motion Picture)	Kevin Woo
2026	"Love Is Everywhere"	K-POPS! (Music from and inspired by K-POPS! Motion Picture)	Soul Rasheed
2026	"Animal"	Animal	JO1
2026	"Whatcha Doin"	Animal	JO1
2026	"Sakura"	Animal	JO1
2026	"Status"	Animal	JO1
2026	"Magic"	The Phase	Monsta X
2026	"Safe Sex"	Precious Cargo	Maiya the Don
2026	"Hubble Time"	I Spy	NCT Wish
2026	"Neon"	Non-album singles	A2O Lite
2026	"V12"	Press Play	Lisa
2026	"Karma Tax"	Heavy is the Crown	Anderson .Paak & Cordae

== Awards and recognition ==
=== Grammy Awards ===
==== 62nd Annual Grammy Awards (2020) ====
- Winner – Best R&B Album – Ventura (Anderson. Paak) – [Dem Jointz contributed to "Reachin’ 2 Much"]

==== 64th Annual Grammy Awards (2022) ====
Sources:

- Winner – Best Rap Song – "Jail" (Kanye West ft. Jay-Z)
- Nominee – Album of the Year – Donda (Kanye West)

=== Emmy Awards ===
- Awarded to the Aftermath production crew: Dr. Dre, Fredwreck, Dem Jointz, Focus..., Blu2th, and Trevor Lawrence Jr.

=== Billboard Honors ===
- 2019: K-Pop Song of the Year – "Obsession" (EXO)

=== Korean Music Awards ===
- 2024: Song of the Year – "Supernova" (AESPA, 11 weeks at #1 on Korean charts)
