= Wash Us in the Blood =

2020 single by Kanye West featuring Travis Scott

Single by Kanye West featuring Travis Scott
- Released: June 30, 2020
- Genre: Industrial hip hop; trap
- Length: 3:10
- Label: GOOD; Def Jam
- Songwriters: Kanye West; Jacques Webster; Ronald Spence, Jr.; Rhys Gagen; Michael Mulé; Isaac DeBoni; Aaron Gomez; Dwayne Abernathy, Jr.; Israel Boyd; Aaron Butts; Mark Mbogo
- Producers: Kanye West; BoogzDaBeast; Ronny J

Kanye West singles chronology
"Closed on Sunday" (2019)	"Wash Us in the Blood" (2020)	"Ego Death" (2020)

Travis Scott singles chronology
"TKN" (2020)	"Wash Us in the Blood" (2020)	"The Plan" (2020)

Music video
- "Wash Us in the Blood" on YouTube

"Wash Us in the Blood" is a song by American rapper Kanye West featuring fellow American rapper Travis Scott. It was produced by West, Ronny J, and BoogzDaBeast, while co-produced by FnZ and A.G., with additional production from Dem Jointz and Israel Boyd. The producers wrote the song alongside Travis Scott, Aaron Butts and KayCyy Pluto. The song was released for digital download and streaming as a standalone single on June 30, 2020, through GOOD Music and Def Jam. Will Welch teased the song during an interview with West in April 2020.

An industrial hip hop song, "Wash Us in the Blood" features electro production. The lyrics of the song see West referencing Jesus' sacrifice, alongside mentioning subjects such as slavery and genocide. The song received generally positive reviews from music critics. Some appreciated it in comparison to West's previous work, though a few critics observed a lack of originality. At the 2021 Billboard Music Awards, the song won the award of Top Gospel Song.

"Wash Us in the Blood" debuted at number 49 on the US Billboard Hot 100, while it attained top 40 positions in Australia, Greece, and Ireland. An accompanying Arthur Jafa-directed music video was released on June 30, 2020. The video makes usage of split-screen presentation, with it including various forms of footage. The music video received mostly positive reviews from critics, who often directed praise towards the combining of clips. However, it was age restricted by YouTube. West performed a version of the song live at Nebuchadnezzar in November 2019.

== Background ==
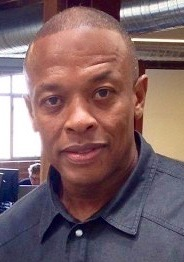
The song was mixed by American record producer Dr. Dre, following on from West announcing that they were collaborating.

During an Instagram Live chat with French artist Michèle Lamy on May 22, 2020, American cinematographer Arthur Jafa revealed that West had been working on a new track. Jafa continued, telling Lamy that the track was set to be included on West's then-upcoming album God's Country and "will be, like, the first single, I guess, off of it." Admitting to not being sure if he was "supposed to not be announcing it or whatever," Jafa said that he "may just be spilling the beans" on the track. West later announced "Wash Us in the Blood" for release via Twitter on June 29, 2020, alongside sharing a 10-second snippet of it as well as the single's cover art. The artwork, designed by Jafa, features a 12" picture disc. An alternate cover was used that is a "blood red" 7", while the song's cassette is also red. American record producer Dr. Dre solely mixed "Wash Us in the Blood", after West had announced a remix version of his ninth studio album Jesus Is King (2019) with the record producer, and the song stands as part of the work that they had created together up to June 2020. The song was produced by West, Ronny J and BoogzDaBeast, and co-produced by Michael Mule and Isaac DeBoni of FnZ alongside A.G., while additional production was handled by Dem Jointz and Israel Boyd. The producers wrote the song alongside Aaron Butts and KayCyy Pluto.

In November 2019, West premiered his Christian opera Nebuchadnezzar. The opera included West performing "Wash Us in the Blood", which was listed in the setlist that he tweeted out prior to Nebuchadnezzar. In April 2020, GQ journalist Will Welch reported that he had heard a playlist of 54 tracks by West while in Mexico with him. Welch commented that the song contrasted with "mellow and sweet" tracks from the playlist, with him comparing its industrial sound to West's sixth studio album Yeezus (2013). The lyrics of the song's chorus were also shared by Welch. This interview marked the first time that the song had been mentioned. The song ultimately being released on June 30, 2020 marked West's first solo release since Jesus Is King in October 2019, and the first release to involve West since his gospel group the Sunday Service Choir's debut studio album Jesus Is Born in December 2019. Before echoing 2017-2021 US president Donald Trump within the song, West had been a known supporter of his.

== Composition and lyrics ==
"Wash Us in the Blood"
A 15-second sample of the chorus to the song, featuring a two-note siren motif. The motif is a version of the audio feedback sound from West's tracks "Send It Up" (2013) and "Feedback" (2016) with a lower semitone, contributing to the song's pulse. The chorus sees West and Travis Scott pleading the Holy Spirit to come down and "wash us in the blood," accompanied by ad-libs from the latter of the two.

Musically, "Wash Us in the Blood" is an industrial hip hop song. Specifically, the track's industrial sound received comparisons to Yeezus and was noted for being combined with electronic sounds. According to The Guardian, "Wash Us in the Blood" is "a club anthem." On the other hand, the track was described as sounding "like the child of a nail grating on the chalkboard and a police siren." The track contains a two-note siren motif that is a feedback sound, which has a lower semitone than the feedback on West's songs "Send It Up" (2013) and "Feedback" (2016). It includes a pulse, coming from the feedback sound. The track features production reminiscent of Yeezus through its "splintering electro-styled beats." Hard-hitting drums are present within the song, alongside experimental sounds such as horns and spray cans. The track includes bongos before introducing "a thumping cacophony of quaking beats" as well as industrial synth lines that are screams, complemented with white noise and deep vocal samples. For the opening of the track, West raps "in short, repetitive bursts, drawling the end of his lines," accompanied by a sample of preacher Robert G. Moore Jr, which was contributed by producer Dem Jointz after being sent the record from Dr. Dre. Travis Scott contributes seven lines to the track through his auto-tuned vocals in a performance that was interpreted as "characteristically woozy," with his vocals appearing on the bridge and part of the second verse.

Lyrically, "Wash Us in the Blood" has a religious message; the song implores God "to deliver black America from evil" through Jesus' sacrifice while discussing mass incarceration, slavery, genocide, and drug-dealing. In the chorus of the song, West and Travis Scott plead for the Holy Spirit to come down and "wash us in the blood." Within the song, Travis Scott also performs ad-libs and criticizes capital punishment. West attacks record labels for trying to "sign a calm 'Ye" as well as others who do not want him to be himself, though the antagonists are unnamed by West. Following on from this, West switches focus by taking aim at the media alongside evoking Trump's criticism of fake news.

== Release and promotion ==
On June 30, 2020, "Wash Us in the Blood" was released for digital download and streaming as the lead single from God's Country. The song was also made available for pre-order via West's website in various physical formats, including a 12-inch vinyl, 7-inch vinyl, cassette, and CD single. In July 2020, West shared a track list for his upcoming tenth studio album Donda on Twitter, revealing the song to be slated for release on the album at the time. (Note: God's Country was retitled to Donda.) However, it was ultimately not included on the album. On November 25, 2019, West performed "Wash Us in the Blood" during Nebuchadnezzar at the Hollywood Bowl. For the performance, West served as the narrator and was accompanied by operatic singers, large groups of robed people that occupied the venue's aisle, and a choir. The choir wore matching robes and stood on an elevated structure that was shaped like a horseshoe, and the version of the song performed had the same instrumental as the final version.

== Reception ==
Professional ratings
Review scores
Source	Rating
The Guardian	5/5 stars
NME	4/5 stars

"Wash Us in the Blood" was met with generally positive reviews from music critics, with a number of them praising the music. Ben Beaumont-Thomas lauded the song in his review for The Guardian, hailing it as "one of [West's] most focused and arresting tracks for years" as well as "an intensely potent study of race and faith," while he explained that the motif "gets your blood up." Sam Moore of NME highlighted the song as "a glorious return to 'Yeezus'-era chaos" and added that it "thankfully proves that even 2020's passionately non-secular Kanye isn't done yet with challenging and provoking his listener." Jason Lipshutz from Billboard described the song as "a return to the boiling anger that made 2013's Yeezus so kinetic," praising West and Travis Scott's "fiery examination of injustice." Craig Jenkins of Vulture viewed the song as a return to form for West as well as "a smoother pairing of West's newfound faith and existing politics," albeit one where he "[recycles] ideas [he's] already perfected elsewhere." Consequence of Sound's Eli Enis commented that the song's sound is "decidedly noisier and more aggressive" in comparison to West's 2019 releases and his eighth studio album Ye (2018), with him noting it being "chock-full of religious themes and motifs."

In a less enthusiastic review, HipHopDX writer Devon Jefferson called the song a "banger" which "appears to be" a return form by West to "the naked and somewhat unassuming eye," though admitted that the song is "more of a mutation of Ye, which we've seen in many forms in recent years." Jefferson elaborated on his viewpoint, stating that "it feels like a veiled attempt at the sort of radical musical advocacy" which West delivered with Yeezus, while dubbing the song a "watered down" version of the album's lead single "Black Skinhead" (2013). Complex's Eric Skelton opined that the song "contains many flaws" and "sounds unfinished," but nonetheless concluded that "it's encouraging to hear Kanye experiment on a song" and that "there are moments where he sounds more creatively charged than he has in quite some time." Writing for Pitchfork, Hubert Adjei-Kontoh remarked that the song "feels more like a tossed-off sketch than a meticulous portrait," citing its "parodic" social commentary and noting the "woozy, clippy" production of the song. Gavin Haynes of The Guardian opined that the song is a "dark, frenetic" track and "has all the commercial potential of a Metal Machine Music B-sides compilation," likening it to "someone pouring a baby into the bear enclosure."

At the 2021 Billboard Music Awards, "Wash Us in the Blood" was awarded Top Gospel Song.

== Music video ==
=== Background and synopsis ===
The music video's usage of split-screen presentation, which includes computer-generated images of West alongside footage of donuts being done by cars, was described as "splicing."

On May 25, 2020, Jafa revealed that he had been "really busy" shooting a music video with West for the lead single from God's Country. Prior to the collaboration, Jafa had used West's 2016 track "Ultralight Beam" in his film Love Is The Message, The Message Is Death that was released the same year. Alongside directing the music video for "Wash Us in the Blood", Jafa designed the single's cover art. West had donated to the families of African-Americans Breonna Taylor and Ahmaud Arbery before using clips of them for the video. It premiered on June 30, 2020 at 10:00 a.m. EDT via YouTube.

For the opening of the music video, warped faces are displayed while police sirens can be heard. The opening shows a police officer berating a fellow officer, which appears to be done during a Black Lives Matter rally. The video uses split-screen presentation throughout and features footage of West's Saint Pablo Tour (2016), police brutality, a gospel choir, people with masks on that struggle to breathe, goats, Afrofuturism, Taylor dancing, Arbery soon before his shooting, protests, church services, cars doing donuts, scenes from Grand Theft Auto V (2013), computer-generated images of West, imprisoned people, and an unmanned drone. To end the video, the camera zooms in on the face of Kanye's daughter North West as she dances at a rehearsal for the Sunday Service Choir. At the same time as her dancing, Kanye West says the chorus of "Wash Us in the Blood", with him doing this after the song's audio has run its full length.

=== Reception ===
BBC arts editor Will Gompertz gave the music video four stars out of five, asserting that "it is a good film," albeit one inferior to Jafa's earlier work such as Love is the Message, The Message is Death and The White Album (2018) due to the position of "Wash Us in the Blood" as the visual's most important element. Jon Caramanica of The New York Times judged that "Jafa's video collage of trauma and exuberance remains effective here." MTV writer Patrick Hosken dubbed the visual "chaotic," noting that it opens "with police sirens and warped faces and intercut with footage of West's own glitched-out face." However, Adjei-Kontoh panned the "risible" video for juxtaposing clips of Taylor and Arbery with video game footage and viral videos, which he argued denies "the sacred inherent in the very lives the song seeks to praise" and reduces black life "to digital death and instant commodification." Within less than 24 hours of release, the music video had received over a million views on YouTube. Based on the platform's community guidelines, the video was age-restricted.

== Commercial performance ==
After three days of tracking, "Wash Us in the Blood" debuted at number 49 on the US Billboard Hot 100. During the tracking period, it received 6.3 million streams and sold 18,000 downloads. The song became West's 108th entry on the Hot 100, bringing him one entry closer to tying with American singer Elvis Presley for the 6th most appearances in the chart's history. It lasted for two weeks on the Hot 100.

The song topped the US Christian Songs, Gospel Songs, Christian Streaming Songs, Christian Digital Song Sales, Gospel Streaming Songs and Gospel Digital Song Sales charts at the same time, following on from West's single "Follow God" (2019) as his second track to top all six of the charts and giving Travis Scott his first appearance on the charts. By debuting at the summit of the US Gospel Songs chart, the song ended the single's 35-week run at number one. The song opened atop the Digital Song Sales chart, becoming West's sixth number one on the chart and Travis Scott's second.

In Australia, the song performed best by debuting at number 31 on the ARIA Singles Chart, becoming one of three new releases to reach the top 50 for the week of July 13, 2020. "Wash Us in the Blood" experienced similar performance in Ireland, peaking at number 32 on the Irish Singles Chart. It also reached the top 50 in Greece and Lithuania, attaining positions of number 37 and 47 on the Greece International Digital Singles and Lithuanian Top 100 charts, respectively. On the UK Singles Chart, the song entered at number 69 for the issue dated July 9, 2020. The following week, it rose 18 places to number 51 on the chart. In total, the song remained on the UK Singles Chart for three weeks.

== Credits and personnel ==
Credits adapted from YouTube.

- Kanye West – lead artist, production, songwriter
- Travis Scott – featured artist, songwriter
- Ronny J – production, songwriter
- BoogzDaBeast – production, songwriter
- Michael Mule – co-production, songwriter
- Isaac DeBoni – co-production, songwriter
- A.G. – co-production, songwriter
- Dem Jointz – additional production, songwriter
- Israel Boyd – additional production, songwriter
- Aaron Butts – songwriter
- KayCyy Pluto – songwriter
- Dr. Dre – mixer
- Josh Berg – recording engineer
- Todd Bergman – recording engineer

== Charts ==
=== Weekly charts ===
Chart performance for "Wash Us in the Blood"
Chart (2020)	Peak position
Australia (ARIA)	31
Belgium (Ultratip Bubbling Under Flanders)	17
Belgium Urban (Ultratop Flanders)	26
Canada Hot 100 (Billboard)	77
Greece International Digital Singles (IFPI)	37
Ireland (IRMA)	32
Lithuania (AGATA)	47
New Zealand Hot Singles (RMNZ)	4
Portugal (AFP)	98
Sweden Heatseeker (Sverigetopplistan)	20
UK Singles (Official Charts)	51
UK Hip Hop/R&B (Official Charts)	33
US Billboard Hot 100	49
US Hot Christian Songs (Billboard)	1
US Gospel Songs (Billboard)	1
US Hot R&B/Hip-Hop Songs (Billboard)	20
US Rolling Stone Top 100	37

=== Year-end charts ===
2020 year-end chart performance for "Wash Us in the Blood"
Chart (2020)	Position
US Christian Songs (Billboard)	33
US Gospel Songs (Billboard)	4

== Release history ==
Release dates and formats for "Wash Us in the Blood"
Region	Date	Format(s)	Label(s)	Ref.
Various	June 30, 2020	Digital download; streaming	GOOD; Def Jam	
