= Jail (song) =

2021 song by Kanye West

Song by Kanye West featuring Jay-Z

from the album Donda
- Released: August 29, 2021
- Recorded: May 13 – August 2021
- Genre: Hip hop; alternative hip hop; pop rock; alt-rock; arena rock
- Length: 4:57
- Label: GOOD; Def Jam
- Songwriters: Kanye West; Charles Njapa; Mike Dean; Mark Williams; Raul Cubina; Dwayne Abernathy Jr.; Sean Solymar; Malik Yusef; John Moylett; Warryn Campbell
- Producers: Kanye West; 88-Keys; Mike Dean; Ojivolta; Dem Jointz; E.Vax; Sean Solymar

"Jail" is a song by American rapper Kanye West from his tenth studio album, Donda (2021), released through GOOD Music and Def Jam Recordings. The song includes vocals from fellow American rapper Jay-Z, as well as additional vocals from American record producer Dem Jointz and the Sunday Service Choir. It contains an interpolation of the Boomtown Rats's 1979 song "Sleep (Finger's Lullaby)", whose member Johnnie Fingers is credited as a songwriter. Towards the end of the album, another version of the song titled "Jail pt 2" appears, which includes new vocals from rapper DaBaby and musician Marilyn Manson. Before its release, the song was previewed at the album's first listening party, located at Mercedes-Benz Stadium.

Upon its release, "Jail" garnered mixed reviews from music critics, while Jay-Z's verse was met with a polarized reception. The appearance of DaBaby and Manson on "Jail pt 2" received widespread criticism because of controversies surrounding allegations of homophobia towards DaBaby and rape towards Manson. Commercially, the original version charted at number 10 on the Billboard Hot 100, and peaked at number 2 on both the Hot Christian Songs and Gospel Songs charts, with the second part peaking at number 63 on the Hot 100. The song would later win the award for Best Rap Song at the 2022 Grammy Awards, and was certified Gold by the Recording Industry Association of America (RIAA) for equivalent sale of 500,000 units in the United States.

== Background ==
West extensively contributed to fellow rapper Jay-Z's sixth studio album, The Blueprint (2001), and signed a recording contract with the latter's record label, Roc-A-Fella Records. West has since co-produced several Jay-Z albums, while Jay-Z executive produced and guest appeared on several of West's earlier albums. The duo's collaborative album, Watch the Throne, was released in 2011, though they had a falling out five years later when West criticized Jay-Z during the former's Saint Pablo Tour. Jay-Z addressed the fallout on the intro to his thirteenth studio album 4:44 (2017), and also assured in a promotional interview that he needed to speak with West for resolving their "family business", before the latter alleged their issues started after his wedding to Kim Kardashian in 2014.

On July 22, 2021, West ended the first listening event for Donda at Mercedes-Benz Stadium in Atlanta by playing a song that includes a verse from Jay-Z. The verse was reportedly recorded at 4pm on the previous day, apparently being rushed by Jay-Z for the event. The song's title was unveiled as "Jail" and during the album's third listening party at Soldier Field in Chicago, a version was played that replaced Jay-Z's verse with one from fellow rapper DaBaby. The replacement was widely condemned by fans, due to DaBaby's July 2021 homophobic rant. The final version re-added Jay-Z and removed DaBaby, marking the first track to include him and West since they both appeared on Drake's "Pop Style" (2016). Despite this, Pt. 2 features vocals from the aforementioned DaBaby as well as Marilyn Manson, who himself was embroiled in controversy, as he was accused of sexually harassing actress Evan Rachel Wood.

== Critical reception ==
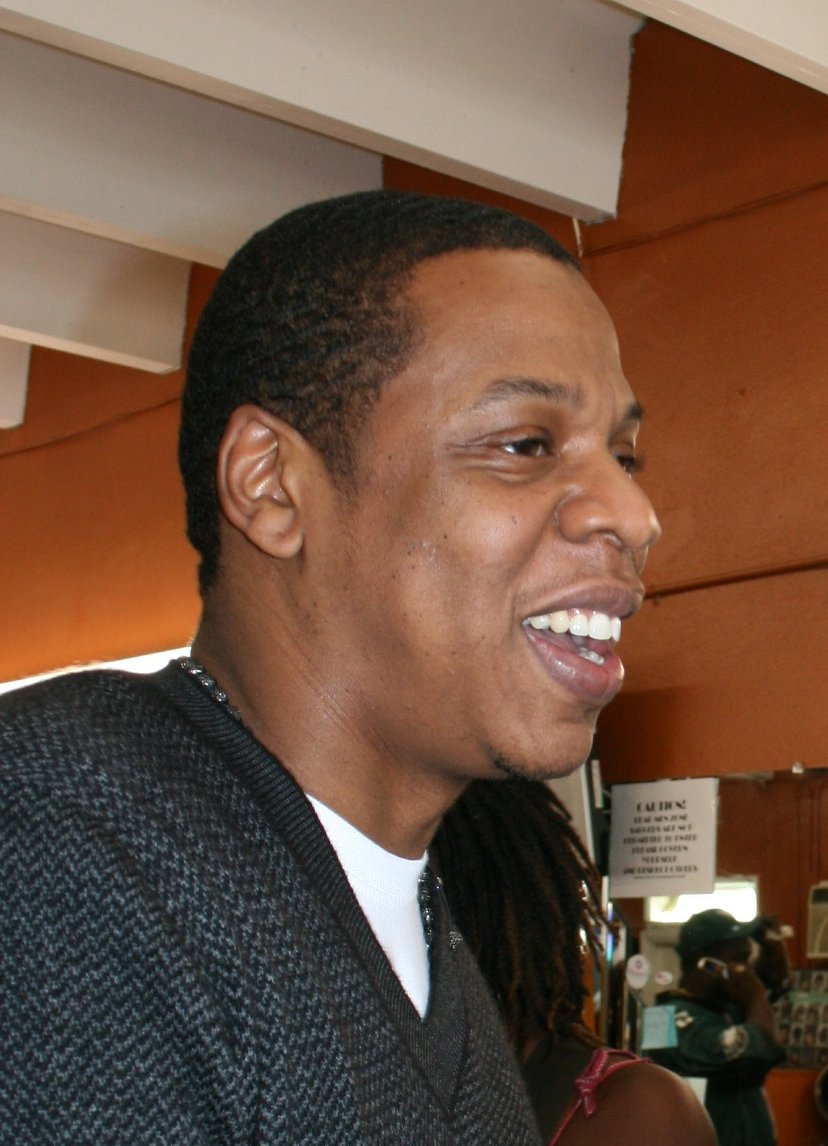
Jay-Z's performance on "Jail" was alternately praised and derided by music critics

"Jail" received mixed reviews. Thomas Hobbs of The Guardian was unimpressed by West's lyrics on the track, describing them as "blunted" when compared to his previous work; he also considered its "dad-rock riffs" to be "slightly flat" and its melody "meandering". In her review for The Independent, Roisin O'Connor condemned the "sluggish one-two punch of the motif" as derivative of the "superior jabs" on Kendrick Lamar's "Humble" (2017). AllMusic's Fred Thomas dubbed it "a banger with no bang" besides its "last seconds". Conversely, Paul Thomas of Rolling Stone described it as "pure catharsis" and "clear-eyed" in its examination of "the threat police pose", highlighting it as one of the tracks off Donda which display a "sincere darkness". In his review for Variety, Chris Willman called it a "pleasingly genre-crossing surprise" with "power chords and anthemic chorus lines that somebody like Imagine Dragons might give their dragons' eye teeth for". Clash's Mike Milenko considered it "a half-decent Kanye cut".

Jay-Z's appearance divided critics. Jon Caramanica of The New York Times simply described it as "decent", while Tom Breihan of Stereogum wrote that "it's not peak Jay"; he considered his "underwhelming" verse to be inferior to the other guest appearances on Donda, and assessed that he "gets through his awkward verse on charisma and accumulated goodwill". Thomas panned his "atrociously written" verse, arguing that "it sounds like a rehearsal take from someone who knows he's written C-grade material". HipHopDX's David Aaron Brake called it "one of the worst verses of his career", and joked that "Kanye awoke him from a nap and asked him for some quick bars in 30 minutes or less". In contrast, Nina Hernandez of The A.V. Club hailed it as "one of Jay's most successful feature verses in several years" and a "clear high point" on Donda. Similarly, Milenko found Jay-Z to be "at his most recent best, sneering into the mic with a cockiness that is unmatched even by Ye himself". Riley Wallace of Exclaim! considered that he provided one of the "shiniest gems" on the album with his verse, while Rhian Daly called it "a thrill" in her review for NME.

== Commercial performance ==
"Jail" debuted at number 10 on the US Billboard Hot 100, becoming West's 20th top-10 hit on the chart and making him the 21st act to have this amount of top-10s. The debut was almost entirely driven by streaming, with the song entering the US Streaming Songs chart at number three and amassing 24.2 million streams. The song reached number two on both the US Christian Songs and Gospel Songs charts. It debuted at number three on the US Hot R&B/Hip-Hop Songs chart, standing among West's seven simultaneous top-10 hits that tied him with Drake's record on the chart.

In Australia, "Jail" opened at number five on the ARIA Singles Chart. The song experienced similar performance in New Zealand, entering the NZ Singles Chart at number six. Elsewhere, it reached number eight on the Icelandic Singles Chart. The song debuted at number seven on the Irish Singles Chart, placing among West's three entries from the album in Ireland. It entered the UK Singles Chart at number 11, also standing as one of his three entries in the United Kingdom.

== Pt 2 ==
"Jail pt 2"

Song by Kanye West featuring DaBaby and Marilyn Manson

from the album Donda
- Released: August 29, 2021
- Length: 4:57
- Label: GOOD; Def Jam
- Songwriters: Kanye West; Jonathan Kirk; Brian Warner; Charles Njapa; Mike Dean; Mark Williams; Raul Cubina; Dwayne Abernathy Jr.; Sean Solymar; Malik Yusef; John Moylett; Warryn Campbell
- Producers: Kanye West; 88-Keys; Mike Dean; Ojivolta; Dem Jointz; E.Vax; Sean Solymar

The second part of the song, titled "Jail pt 2", was premiered to a controversial reception at the third and final public listening party at Soldier Field in Chicago on August 26, 2021. It was subsequently released as Donda's 24th track on August 29, 2021. Initially, the song appeared on the album's Spotify track list while blanked out and unavailable to play, until it became playable at 10pm. West posted screenshots to his Instagram of texts between him and his manager Bu Thiam demonstrating that the song was not able to be released due to DaBaby's management refusing to clear his appearance, with West replying: "I'm not taking my brother off. He was the only person who said he would vote for me in public." He also accused Universal Music Group of having blocked the song's inclusion on the album; sources at the company denied the allegations and called them "preposterous".

== Charts ==
=== Weekly charts ===
Chart performance for "Jail"
Chart (2021)	Peak position
Australia (ARIA)	5
Austria (Ö3 Austria Top 40)	37
Canada Hot 100 (Billboard)	9
Czech Republic Singles Digital (ČNS IFPI)	53
Denmark (Tracklisten)	7
France (SNEP)	57
Global 200 (Billboard)	6
Greece International (IFPI)	74
Iceland (Tónlistinn)	8
Ireland (IRMA)	9
Italy (FIMI)	56
Lithuania (AGATA)	21
Netherlands (Single Top 100)	39
New Zealand (Recorded Music NZ)	6
Norway (VG-lista)	12
Portugal (AFP)	26
South Africa (TOSAC)	2
Slovakia Singles Digital (ČNS IFPI)	32
Sweden (Sverigetopplistan)	19
Switzerland (Schweizer Hitparade)	23
UK Singles (Official Charts)	11
UK Hip Hop/R&B (Official Charts)	3
US Billboard Hot 100	10
US Hot Christian Songs (Billboard)	2
US Gospel Songs (Billboard)	2
US Hot R&B/Hip-Hop Songs (Billboard)	3

Chart performance for "Jail pt 2"
Chart (2021)	Peak position
Australia (ARIA)	61
Canadian Hot 100 (Billboard)	60
Global 200 (Billboard)	60
Portugal (AFP)	155
South Africa (TOSAC)	41
US Billboard Hot 100	63
US Christian Songs (Billboard)	19
US Gospel Songs (Billboard)	19
US Hot R&B/Hip-Hop Songs (Billboard)	31

=== Year-end charts ===
2021 year-end chart performance for "Jail"
Chart (2021)	Position
US Christian Songs (Billboard)	18
US Gospel Songs (Billboard)	7

2021 year-end chart performance for "Jail pt 2"
Chart (2021)	Position
US Christian Songs (Billboard)	64
US Gospel Songs (Billboard)	24

== Certifications ==
Certifications for "Jail"
Region	Certification	Certified units/sales
Canada (Music Canada)	Gold	40,000^{‡}
New Zealand (RMNZ)	Gold	15,000^{‡}
United States (RIAA)	Gold	500,000^{‡}
^{‡} Sales+streaming figures based on certification alone.
