= Super Bowl LI halftime show =

Halftime show of the 2017 Super Bowl

- Date: February 5, 2017
- Location: Houston, Texas
- Venue: NRG Stadium
- Headliner: Lady Gaga
- Sponsor: Pepsi Zero Sugar
- Director: Hamish Hamilton
- Producer: Ricky Kirshner

Super Bowl halftime show chronology
| 50 (2016) | LI (2017) | LII (2018) |

The Super Bowl LI Halftime show took place on February 5, 2017, at NRG Stadium in Houston, Texas, as part of Super Bowl LI. Lady Gaga headlined the show, with no special guests (the first overall solo-headlined show since the 2010 edition and the first female solo-headlined show without special guests since the 1996 edition), performing a medley of her songs, including material from her then-most recent studio album, Joanne (2016). The show formerly held the record as the most nominated Super Bowl halftime show in Emmy Awards history, winning the Primetime Emmy Award for Outstanding Lighting Design / Lighting Direction for a Variety Special. This record was later broken by Super Bowl LX halftime show headlined by Bad Bunny in 2026, securing 9 nominations.

Gaga began rehearsing for the show in January 2017. Her sister Natali gave her the idea of performing from atop the NRG Stadium; Gaga worked on the logistics behind it. She promoted the performance by uploading short clips on her social media accounts. Fashion house Versace created the wardrobe for the show, while designers Bruce Rodgers and LeRoy Bennett did the show's production work with lighting designer Bob Barnhart. The stage was created by All Access Staging & Productions, which had also created previous Super Bowl halftime stages. During the introduction scene, Gaga was accompanied by a fleet of 300 drones, which formed an image of the American flag behind her. It marked the first time the drones had been used as part of a television broadcast.

The show was noted for its acknowledgment of the LGBTQ community, the perceived political undertones, and the technical achievement of the use of drones. It received critical acclaim, with media outlets praising Gaga for demonstrating artistic and musical qualities while citing it as one of the top Super Bowl halftime performances ever. With 117.5 million television viewers, it was the fifth most-watched Super Bowl halftime show after the halftime shows during Super Bowl XLIX and subsequent editions from Super Bowl LVII onwards, and had higher average viewership than the game itself. Gaga's music catalog benefited from the performance, with sales growth for all her records. The song "Million Reasons" from Joanne, which was part of the set list, consequently became her 14th top-ten single on the Billboard Hot 100 chart.

== Synopsis ==
External videos
- Full Super Bowl LI halftime show – via Lady Gaga's official channel on YouTube.

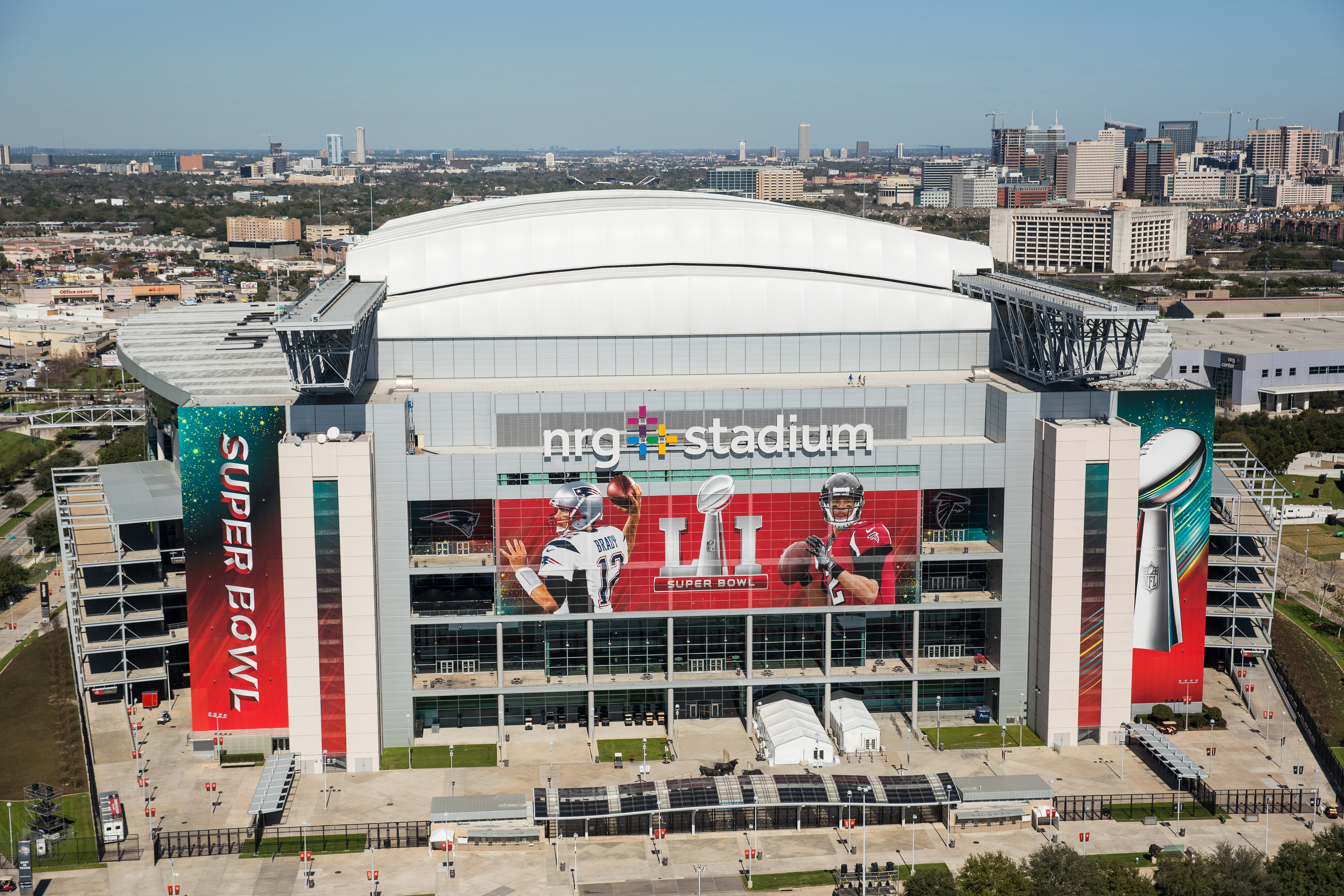
NRG Stadium, where Super Bowl LI and the halftime show took place

The halftime show began with a prerecorded segment on the roof of NRG Stadium. Lady Gaga started singing "God Bless America" (1939) as drones swarm behind her emitting red, white and blue color. She then sang Woody Guthrie's "This Land Is Your Land" (1945), followed by the ending of the Pledge of Allegiance: "One nation under God, indivisible, with liberty and justice for all." Gaga then dove from the rooftop as the drones behind her formed the design of the Flag of the United States. She came down from the roof to begin the show proper and stood on a tall pillar across the stage as a montage of her songs "Dance in the Dark" (2009), "Just Dance" (2008), "LoveGame" (2008), and "Paparazzi" (2008) played in the background. She then sang a line from "The Edge of Glory" (2011) before abruptly switching to "Poker Face" (2008), as fireworks lit up behind her. After the first verse and chorus, Gaga, attached to a harness, bounced from the pillar to the main stage. Her dancers joined her as she sang "Born This Way" (2011), which included the track's intermediate spoken verse.

As the song ended, Gaga headed towards a star-shaped structure on another corner of the stage before singing "Telephone" (2009), while holding her characteristic "Disco Stick" prop. A dancer carried her back to center stage where she performed "Just Dance" (2008) with a keytar. The singer moved from the stage to the ground as the song ended before moving to a podium with a piano. She began singing "Million Reasons" (2016) as the audience on the field synchronously waved LED batons. Continuing the song, she came down from the podium and embraced a fan in the audience. For the finale of "Bad Romance" (2009), a team of white-clad dancers strutted across the main stage as Gaga disappeared into the crowd for a quick-change. She finally ran back onto the stage wearing a white football-inspired costume as they performed the track's choreography accompanied by flamethrowers. After performing the song's bridge and last chorus on a raised platform, Gaga was carried to the edge of the stage by her dancers. As the song concluded, fireworks erupted before Gaga said "Super Bowl LI!", did a microphone drop and then jumped off the stage while catching a football covered with diamonds.

== Background ==
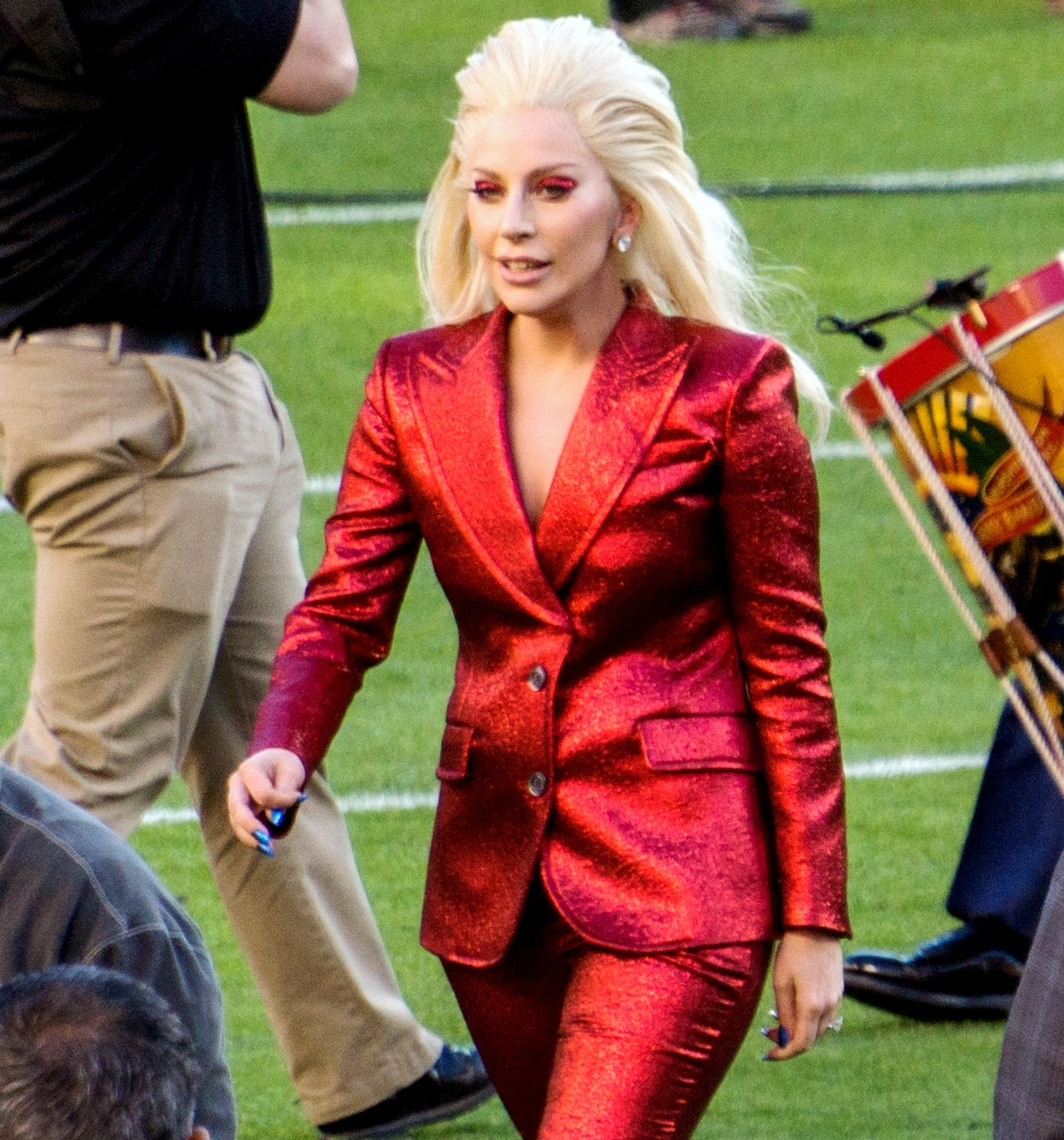
Gaga after performing the national anthem at the Super Bowl 50 on February 7, 2016

Around August 2016, media outlets began reporting that Adele was in discussions with the National Football League (NFL) to perform at the Super Bowl LI halftime show, which was planned for February 5, 2017, at Houston's NRG Stadium. Pepsi Zero Sugar would sponsor the show. During her Adele Live 2016 concert tour in Los Angeles, Adele clarified that although she had been asked to perform by the NFL, she had declined since she did not believe she was suitable for the halftime show. Soon after, the NFL explained they had not signed any musician and were still in discussions with several artists.

In the meantime, Gaga announced that she would be releasing her fifth studio album, Joanne, in October 2016. Billboard reported that the NFL was in discussions with the singer, because of her performance of the national anthem at the previous Super Bowl. On September 29, 2016, Gaga confirmed on her Instagram account that she would be performing at the halftime show. Fox Sports president and executive producer of the show, John Entz, also confirmed Gaga's involvement, and added, "[She] is one of the most electric performers of our generation, and we couldn't be happier with the choice to have her headline the Super Bowl LI Halftime Show... It is going to be an incredible night."

According to Emma Quigley, Pepsi's North American head of music, and Justin Toman, Pepsi's sports marketing director, choosing Gaga to headline the show made sense based on her previous musical output and endeavors. They considered various parameters—social media followers, record sales, trending topic—and then shortlisted her. Toman also took into account the total time it usually takes for the show—seven minutes for set up, 12 minutes for the main show, and another seven minutes to dismantle—and believed the singer could deliver "power, punch, performance, singing, lights" within that time frame.

== Development ==
=== Conception ===
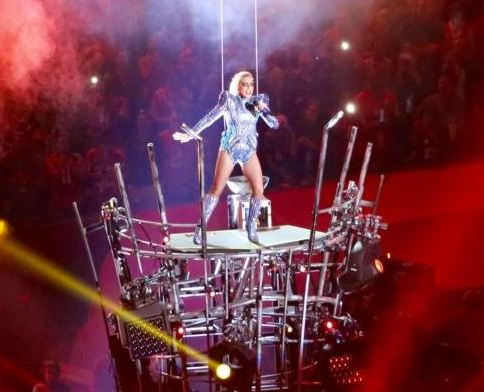
Gaga performing "Poker Face", after descending from the roof of the NRG Stadium in a harness

In October 2016, Gaga told Entertainment Weekly that she wanted to give "the best show for the football fans, the ones that are watching at home". Although indecisive about the set list, the singer wanted to play a mixture of her past and recent songs. She also confirmed that the NFL heard Joanne before its release and decided to offer her the halftime performance slot. Her inspiration came from earlier halftime performances by Michael Jackson, Diana Ross, and Bruce Springsteen. Gaga remarked that she loved "all the [past shows]". In December 2016, Gaga launched the "Guest of Honor" contest with Pepsi and the NFL. This would give her fans the opportunity to see the halftime show from the stage's sidelines. The singer uploaded a video titled Fanifesto, talking about the power of fandom. She explained that to win, fans had to upload a 15–60-second video on Instagram or Twitter with the hashtags #GOHContest and #PepsiHalftime by December 15, professing their fandom for Gaga.

Billboard's Colin Stutz revealed that Gaga would not be accompanied by any guest musicians, which was different from the shows of the past few years. She was the first headliner to perform with no special guests since The Who during their 2010 show and only the eighth act to do so. Pepsi confirmed in a press release that a ten-second countdown would precede Gaga's performance, when a lead-in, produced by Creator's Studio featuring jazz singer Tony Bennett, would be shown. Gaga confirmed her plan to sing from atop the dome of NRG Stadium, an idea given to her by her sister Natali Germanotta. US media had expected Gaga to do "something overtly political" during her performance. The NFL refuted news that they had forbidden the singer from mentioning President Donald Trump during the show. A representative from the organization issued a statement saying, "The Super Bowl is a time when people really come together. Lady Gaga is focused on putting together an amazing show for fans and we love working with her on it; we aren't going to be distracted by this."

=== Rehearsals ===
By January 2017, Gaga began posting images on her social media accounts, showing her practicing for the show. She first built a tent in her backyard where she rehearsed with her dancers for weeks. Gaga enlisted vocal coach Don Lawrence to help her belt out the correct notes. Lawrence worked with Gaga for her National Anthem performance the previous year, as well as during her concert tours.

Pepsi uploaded a behind-the-scenes video from the rehearsals, where Gaga explained the main challenge was to make the halftime performance different from the preceding years but to still keep it about the music. On his social media, choreographer Richy Jackson was shown in the middle of a session with the dancers, displaying the characteristic moves from the song, "Bad Romance". Jackson said the dancers were hand-picked and had worked before with the singer. He added the show would unveil a different aspect of Gaga, since she had never had the opportunity to perform on a big world stage like the Super Bowl.

As the day of the show approached, the singer kept posting short videos from rehearsals as well as behind-the-scenes. She showed her pre-game dance routines and choreography, FaceTimeing with her grandmother, warming up for the show, and the onstage activities. Toman explained that they wanted to have fans get "a peek into the journey to halftime, tapping into the artist fanbase—that really works. Doing a behind-the-scenes content program, giving people that glimpse of what it takes to prepare. People love that. So that really worked and we continue to do that." In an interview with Billboard, Gaga explained: "I really had a real sense of being in the zone for this performance, worked on it for a really long time, took months, trained hard. Every second I wanted to give the world and my fans what they deserve, a great show. Its really exciting, I wanted to enjoy the moment not just be hell bent [sic] on everything."

=== Fashion ===
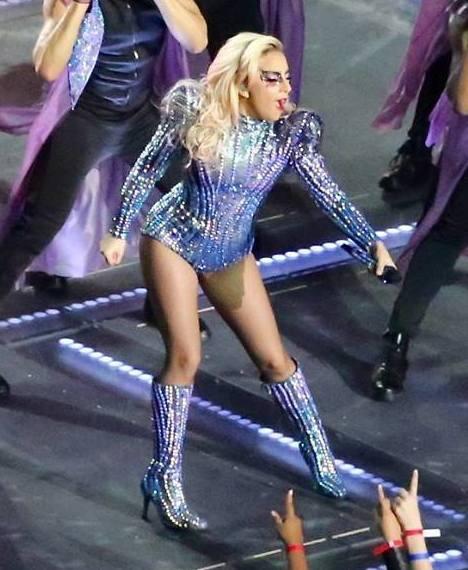
Gaga performing "Born This Way" during the show in the Atelier Versace iridescent-colored jumpsuit

After the release of Joanne, Gaga began wearing simple outfits, deviating from her previously outrageous attire. Before the halftime show, there was much uncertainty about what she would wear for the performance. Versace created all the looks for the show, including the final one inspired by the label's Spring 2017 collection. The singer wore a custom, Atelier Versace, iridescent-colored jumpsuit, beaded all over with Swarovski crystals, along with high shoulder pads and matching knee-length boots. The bodysuit facilitated swift movement onstage, aiding to Gaga's mobility.

According to fashion expert Cameron Silver, Gaga's look for the performance of "Bad Romance" was the "most interesting". It consisted of sequined silver hot pants and a football shoulder-pad-like jacket. Billboard deemed both the outfits a "customary nod" to Gaga's past, adding, "It was a solid balance of glam and sexy without overdoing it [...] [The dress] gave fantasy to her fans. She looked great. She sounded great. It's like she was playing football in heels." Gaga also wore a golden jacket which had shoulder spikes while playing the keytar.

Gaga's longtime collaborator Brandon Maxwell styled her looks; singer David Bowie's persona Ziggy Stardust influenced her makeup. Donatella Versace flew to Houston to help with the costumes, including dressing the singer before the show. Sarah Nicole Tanno did Gaga's makeup, and Frederic Aspiras coiffed her hair. Tanno used products from Marc Jacobs' cosmetics line to give Gaga a "timeless" look. The singer wore a pair of eye masks made of crystals, extending to her temples. According to Vanessa Friedman of The New York Times choosing Versace as her fashion brand for the costumes "helped to support a subtler, arguably more powerful, message" by Gaga. She had promised to make the show about "inclusion" and to that extent, using Versace and a number of other designers like Dr. Martens and Vera Wang made the point.

=== Multimedia ===
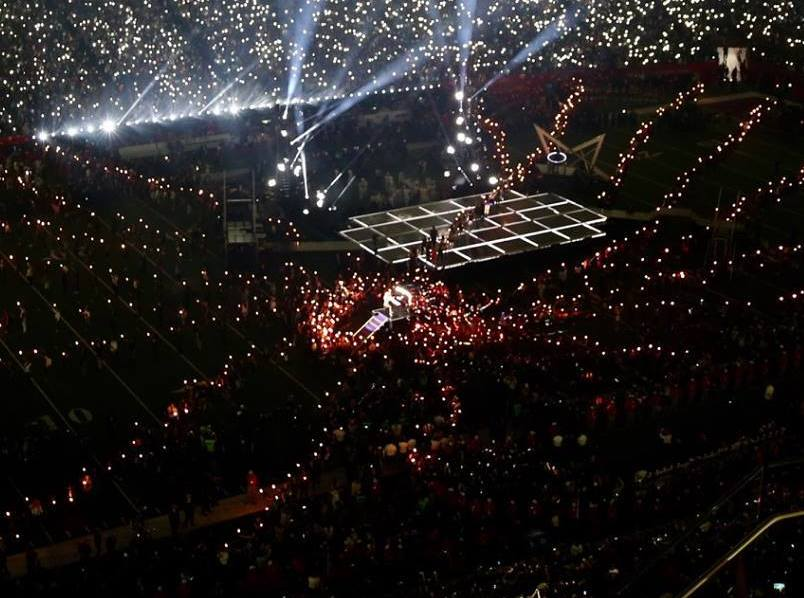
During "Million Reasons" a field cast used Glow Motion LED Batons, creating a three-dimensional moving pixel show.

Designers Bruce Rodgers of Tribe Inc., LeRoy Bennett, and lighting designer Bob Barnhart of 22 Degrees handled the show's production work. All Access Staging & Productions, the creators of previous Super Bowl halftime stages, built the stage. Its key features included a main platform, two towers, three star-shaped side stages, a piano dome and a stage lift. The towers were about 30 feet (9.1 m) tall and could be carried by carts to the field for set-up. All Access had just over four weeks to create the pieces and the main stage. It required 17 trucks for storage and transport. The show used a light-emitting diode (LED) system from Verrents and sound by ATK Audiotek. About 5,000 LED lights were embedded in the stage. Special effects group Strictly FX handled the pyrotechnics.

Both Rodgers and Bennett combined their ideas for the show, with input from Barnhart and special effects designer Mark Grega from FX. Rodgers described the stage setup as "the most intense technological and visually impactful epic possible". The show featured a field cast led by KP Terry; they used Glow Motion LED batons, creating a 3D moving pixel show. Glow Motion, a Nashville-based company, programmed each individual baton to sync with the music played. "All our field cast and staging experts, technicians and vendors [had] stepped up to support the vision, and Gaga herself, having embraced the concept early on, [had] taken on the task with more interest and heart than any other artist that I've worked with in the last 11 years," Rodgers concluded.

Production Resource Group (PRG) supplied the show's lighting. PRG's Chris Conti shared Barnhart's floor plan for the lighting setup, which used DMX512 to control the system. Barnhart recalled that "[the] show was a little more complicated this year, due to the amount of scenery that we normally don't have on a halftime show", but it was better since there were no video backdrops. An array of 36 Clay Paky Sharpy fixtures was added around the roof of NRG Stadium, which lit the Houston night sky with light beams. Barnhart also arranged a backlight array fixture, using Philips Vari-Lite VL4000 and PRG Best Boy. LED tape, controlled by the lighting team, was used around the main production area. They could light the stage from afar. Director Hamish Hamilton and his crew devised their own way of capturing and transmitting the show for the live audience.

=== Drones ===
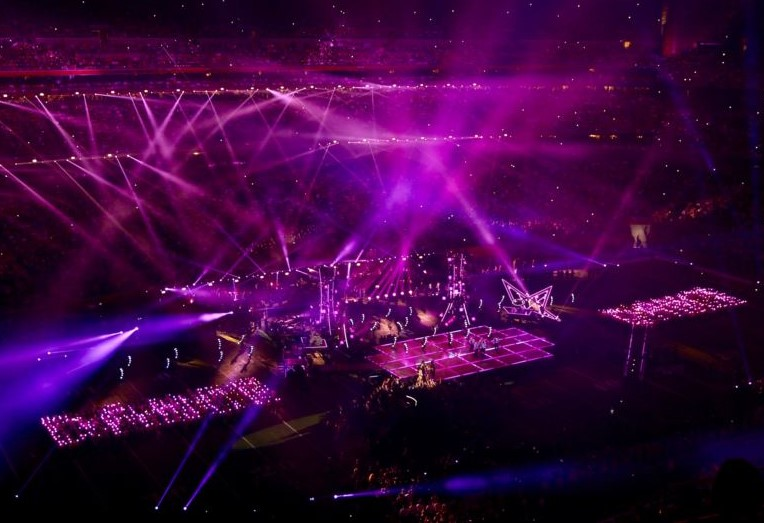
A long shot view of the halftime stage during the performance of "Just Dance"

While performing on top of NRG Stadium, a fleet of 300 synchronized, LED-equipped "Shooting Star" quadcopter drones provided by Intel accompanied Gaga. They formed an image of the American flag behind the singer. This marked the first time the drones were used as part of a television broadcast. According to Intel's senior vice president Josh Walden, "Gaga and the Super Bowl creative team wanted to pull off something that had never been done before ... The potential for these light show drones is endless." Barnhart explained he had wanted to use drones in the Super Bowl for many years, but never encountered the appropriate technology. With permission from producer Ricky Kirshner, he reached out to Intel representatives and communicated that he wanted to use their drone technology for a "large TV show in February. I can't give you money, but I can give you exposure"; Intel agreed.

Since the drones did not fly indoors, Barnhart wrote a new creative segment for the opening, with Gaga singing atop the roof of the stadium and the drones flying behind her. The segment was filmed earlier in the week due to safety concerns over flying the formation over a live audience. The Federal Aviation Administration (FAA) forbid the use of drones within a 34.5 miles (55.5 km) radius of NRG Stadium (which is also located near William P. Hobby Airport). The production staff obtained special permission from the FAA to perform the drone acrobatics.

Intel began preparing in early December 2016, working out the logistics. After coming to a consensus with the creative team, they began storyboarding the drones, finally deciding to display a star array, the American flag and the Pepsi logo. The drones used for the show had a plastic and foam body for soft impacts, which were about 1 foot (0.30 m) square and weighed 8 ounces (0.50 lb). They were connected Wirelessly to a central computer and each executed their unique, individual choreography.

== Critical response ==
Gaga's halftime performance drew rave reviews from critics. A writer for Time described the show as "among the very best in the history of the form, racing ambitiously through the artist's entire career and putting forward the qualities of the artist that just work". The New Yorker review described Gaga and the show as "an astute, intense, and disciplined performance". Andrew Unterberger of Billboard felt the performance would go down as "one of the best halftime sets of the century" and that it had cemented her as a "legacy artist... It was Gaga through and through, and every song felt more gratifying than the last... reminding you why Gaga's pop supremacy was so inarguable not all that long ago." He noted that there was nothing "outrageous" in the show.

Chris Chase of Fox Sports said the halftime show would "go down with Michael, Prince, Beyoncé, and Bruce as the greatest ever." Marguerite Ward from CNBC considered the show to be Gaga's comeback, noting how she had announced in 2015 that she would retire. "Fast forward to 2017. [Lady Gaga] is back on the global stage, gearing up for a new world tour", she added. Writing for Variety, Sonia Saraiya described the show as "breathtaking" and "soar[ing]", but felt it "lacked an iconic moment or emotional button". Daniel Fienberg of The Hollywood Reporter was disappointed the show never had a "close-up or any sort of swooping medium-shot to accentuate [Gaga's] movement". He felt that the show lacked any political messages and that "the weakly presented dive" detracted from her rendition of "God Bless America" and "This Land Is Your Land".

Nico Land of Salon noted Gaga was the first artist to refer to the LGBTQ community during a Super Bowl halftime show when she sang "Born This Way". Land considered this a "crucial milestone" for the community. He said, "Putting LGBT issues on the main stage at the Super Bowl served as a powerful message of queer solidarity in the face on an unprecedented wave of challenges from our government." Although Gaga did not openly criticize Trump, Land viewed the singer's opening performance as a subtle "dig" at the President. Singing "This Land Is Your Land", a protest anthem for the Women's Marches across the country following Trump's inauguration, Gaga referred to Trump's policies on immigration, according to the writer. According to Joanna Robinson of Vanity Fair, the performance was a "dog whistle" against Trump's plans to build a wall between the United States and Mexico.

At the 69th Primetime Creative Arts Emmy Awards, which took place in September 2017, the performance received six nominations—the most by any halftime show. It won for Outstanding Lighting Design / Lighting Direction for a Variety Special, while nominated for Outstanding Special Class Program, Outstanding Production Design for Variety, Nonfiction, Event or Award Special, Outstanding Technical Direction, Camerawork, Video Control for a Limited Series, Movie, or Special, Outstanding Music Direction, and Outstanding Sound Mixing for a Variety Series or Special.

== Commercial impact ==
In the United States, the Super Bowl LI halftime show experienced the first increase in viewership since 2015 (and the last such ratings rebound in the 2010s decade). The performance attracted 117.5 million television viewers, making it the sixth most watched halftime show, behind the Super Bowl halftime shows in 2015 and subsequent editions from 2023 onwards, respectively. For the fourth year in a row, the viewership was higher than the game, which was viewed by an audience of 111.3 million. Gaga's halftime show currently holds the record for the largest average game-to-halftime show audience percentage gain - at 5.6% more viewers - since the NFL switched back to regular booking of mainstream pop acts for Super Bowl halftime shows in 2011. A total of 5.1 million tweets were made about Gaga's performance, including 2.2 million during her show, making her the most tweeted-about entertainer in the show's history. According to statistics presented by Billboard, the most tweeted moments were when the show ended, followed by Gaga waving at her parents from the stage, and when the singer descended from the NRG Stadium roof in a harness. The set list was also included in the most tweets tabulation with "Bad Romance" getting the highest number of tweets. "Telephone" was the second most tweeted-about song followed by "Born This Way".

According to Nielsen SoundScan on the day of the show, Gaga sold 150,000 digital albums and songs in the United States, up by 1,000% from the previous day. The singer sold a total of 125,000 digital song downloads, led by "Million Reasons" (45,000 up by 900%), then "Bad Romance" (13,000), "Born This Way" (12,000) and "Poker Face" (10,000). Her albums sold more than 23,000 downloads, with Joanne selling over 12,000 copies, followed by The Fame Monster (2009), which sold about 6,000. Gaga acquired over 24,000 listeners on music streaming website Pandora Radio. Total station adds for the singer went up by 1,391% week-by-week with a cumulative 14.8 million stations; her songs received 2.5 billion spins. All the songs performed received significant spin boosts. This was different from the previous halftime shows, when Coldplay was up by 225%, Bruno Mars by 62%, and Beyoncé up 60%.

After the final tabulation, Gaga sold over 410,000 digital song downloads for the tracking week of February 9, 2017, an increase of 1,850%. "Million Reasons" (which had dropped off the chart the previous week), re-entered the Billboard Hot 100 at number four, becoming Gaga's 14th top-ten single. It also reached the top of the Digital Songs chart with 149,000 downloads. Other songs entering the Digital Songs chart were "Born This Way" (41,000, number seven), "Bad Romance" (39,000, number nine) "Poker Face" (34,000, number fourteen), "Just Dance" (25,000, number 26) and "Telephone" (20,000, number 39). Gaga's streaming activity increased by 196% to 41.8 million streams, led by "Million Reasons" with 3.9 million plays. Her album sales increased by 844% to 135,000 equivalent units, with Joanne rising from 66 to 2 on the Billboard 200, selling 74,000 units (48,000 traditional album sales). Other entries on the chart included The Fame (2008) (38,000, number 6), Born This Way (2011) (17,000, number 25) and Artpop (2013) (5,000, number 174). Gaga reached number one on the Billboard Artist 100 chart, which measures activity across various social media websites as well as record sales.

The Super Bowl performance also had an impact in Canada, where Joanne vaulted from 54 to 2, with a 524% gain in album-equivalent units. In the United Kingdom, Joanne's sales were up by 222%, while The Fame was up by 1,605% after the show. On the UK Albums Chart, Joanne moved from 88 to 11, with sales increasing to 5,289 copies, while the latter entered at number 38, selling 2,263 copies.

== Set list ==
The following songs were performed during the halftime show.

1. "God Bless America" / "This Land Is Your Land" (pre-recorded intro)
2. "Poker Face" (containing elements of "Dance in the Dark", "Just Dance", "LoveGame", "Paparazzi" and "The Edge of Glory")
3. "Born This Way"
4. "Telephone"
5. "Just Dance"
6. "Million Reasons"
7. "Bad Romance"

== Personnel ==
Credits and personnel adapted from Live Design website.

Main performer

- Lady Gaga

Creative personnel

- Executive producer: Ricky Kirshner
- Director: Hamish Hamilton
- Choreographer: Richy "Squirrel" Jackson
- Production designer: Bruce Rodgers, Tribe Inc.
- Co-production designer: LeRoy Bennett
- Lighting designer: Bob Barnhart, 22 Degrees

Vendors

- Set and staging fabrication: All Access
- Pyro and effects: Strictly FX
- On-field cast LED batons: Glow Motion Technologies
- Lighting equipment supplier: PRG
- LED systems: VER
- Sound equipment provider: ATK

Lighting crew

- Lighting directors: Pete Radice, David Grill, Jason Rudolph
- Gaffer: Tony Ward
- Best boy: David Serralles, Kieth Berkes, Dean Brown, Joe Faretta, George Clayton
- Lead tech: Robb Minnotte
- Tech: Matt Geneczko, Jeff Anderson
- Network designer: Chris Conti
- Lead spot op: Tim Altman, George Sennerfelder, John Washburton
- Lead spot tech: Quinn Smith
- Assistant lighting director: Megan Seibel
- Fiber tech: Alex Ward

Art design team

- Art directors: Shelley Rodgers, Lindsey Breslauer
- Set and CAD designers: Maria Maria Garcia, Bruno Oliveira, Evan Alexander,
- Assistant art director: Lucas Ingram

Stage video and projection crew

- LED technicians: Gary Madura, Luke Pilato, Rod Silhanek, Michael Spencer
- Media server operator: Jason Rudolph
- Media server technician: Tim Nauss

Intel Shooting Star drone team

- Lead technical engineer: Daniel Gurden
- Software development engineer (programmer): Tobias Gurden
- General manager of drone light shows: Natalie Cheung
- Project manager: Madeline Ong
- Pilot in command: Clay Coleman, Pilot In Command
- Hardware engineer: Tobi Lang

All Access staging and productions crew

- All Access staging supervisor: Tim Fallon
- Project manager: Tommy Rose
- Manufacturing design: Erik Eastland
- Automation technician and fabrication lead: Fidel Garza
- Head carpenter: Roger Cabot
- Staging technicians: Kyle Duarte, Jesus Arroyo, Arturo Martinez, Jeff Haas, Anthony Pozos, Micky Dymond,
- Staging technician/fabricator: Julio Roch
- LED technicians: Zack Eastland, Blake Chandler

== See also ==
- 2017 in American music
- 2017 in American television
