= Born This Way (song) =

2011 single by Lady Gaga

Single by Lady Gaga

from the album Born This Way
- Released: February 11, 2011
- Recorded: 2010
- Studio: Abbey Road (London); Germano Studios The Hit Factory (New York City)
- Genre: Electropop; house
- Length: 4:20
- Label: Streamline; KonLive; Interscope
- Songwriters: Lady Gaga; Jeppe Laursen
- Producers: Lady Gaga; Jeppe Laursen; Fernando Garibay; Paul Blair aka DJ White Shadow

Lady Gaga singles chronology
"Dance in the Dark" (2010)	"Born This Way" (2011)	"Judas" (2011)

Music video
- "Born This Way" on YouTube

"Born This Way" is a song by the American singer Lady Gaga, and the lead single from her second studio album of the same name. Written by Gaga and Jeppe Laursen, who produced it along with Fernando Garibay and DJ White Shadow, the track was developed while Gaga was on the road with the Monster Ball Tour. Inspired by 1990s music which empowered women, minorities, and the LGBTQ community, Gaga explained that "Born This Way" was her freedom song. It was also inspired by Carl Bean and his song "I Was Born This Way", released in 1977. She sang part of the chorus at the 2010 MTV Video Music Awards and announced it as the lead single from the album, released on February 11, 2011.

The song is backed by rumbling synth sounds, a humming bass and additional chorus percussion, with sole organ toward the end. Its lyrics discuss the self-empowerment of the LGBTQ community and racial minorities. Critics positively reviewed the song, calling it a "club-ready anthem". In 2023, Rolling Stone named "Born This Way" the Most Inspirational LGBTQ Song of All Time. It reached number one in over 25 countries and was certified diamond in Brazil as well as multi-platinum in Australia, Austria, Canada, Italy, Norway, Sweden, the United Kingdom, and the United States. "Born This Way" has sold 8.2 million copies worldwide, making it one of the best-selling singles of all time.

Nick Knight directed the accompanying music video, which was inspired by surrealist painters like Salvador Dalí and Francis Bacon. Gaga is depicted as giving birth to a new race during a prologue. After a series of dance sequences, the video concludes with the view of a city populated by this race. Critics noted the video's references to the work of Madonna, Michael Jackson and fashion designer Alexander McQueen, as well as Greek mythology and surrealism.

Gaga performed the song at the 53rd Annual Grammy Awards after coming out of an incubating vessel. Shortly after, she added it to the setlist of the last leg of the Monster Ball Tour. "Born This Way" was later performed on television shows, such as Saturday Night Live, Dick Clark's New Year's Rockin' Eve and Good Morning America, many of the singer's tours, and it was notably part of her Super Bowl LI halftime show set. The song was treated with different remixes, including a "Country Road" version recorded by Gaga herself and another by Indian production duo Salim–Sulaiman. It has been covered by artists such as Alice Cooper, Madonna, and Katy Perry.

== Background ==
The nexus of 'Born This Way' and the soul of the record reside in this idea that you were not necessarily born in one moment. You have your entire life to birth yourself into becoming the ultimate potential vision that you see for you. Who you are when you come out of your mother's womb is not necessarily who you will become. 'Born This Way' says your birth is not finite, your birth is infinite.

— Gaga talking about the meaning of "Born This Way".

In 2010, Lady Gaga was touring for her second world tour, the Monster Ball. At that time she started developing ideas for her second studio album, Born This Way (2011). The first song written and recorded for the album was the title track itself which she wrote in Liverpool and Manchester, England, described by Gaga as a "magical message" song. She wrote it in ten minutes and compared the process to an Immaculate Conception. DJ White Shadow, one of the producers of the track, credited Gaga for coming up with the idea and the theme behind the song. "We recorded it around the world, on the road, in whatever was available. It sounds like it reads, but not like you think until you hear it," he added. Gaga wanted to record her own freedom song, and explained with Billboard her inspiration behind the song:

I want to write my this-is-who-the-fuck-I-am anthem, but I don't want it to be hidden in poetic wizardry and metaphors. I want it to be an attack, an assault on the issue because I think, especially in today's music, everything gets kind of washy sometimes and the message gets hidden in the lyrical play. Harkening back to the early '90s, when Madonna, En Vogue, Whitney Houston and TLC were making very empowering music for women and the gay community and all kind of disenfranchised communities, the lyrics and the melodies were very poignant and very gospel and very spiritual and I said, 'That's the kind of record I need to make. That's the record that's going to shake up the industry.' It's not about the track. It's not about the production. It's about the song. Anyone could sing 'Born This Way'. It could've been anyone.

In May 2021, during the 10th anniversary of the album, Gaga revealed that it was inspired by Carl Bean and his song "I Was Born This Way", released in 1977. On her social media, she wrote, "'Born This Way', my song and album, were inspired by Carl Bean, a gay black religious activist who preached, sung and wrote about being Born This Way."

== Artwork and release ==
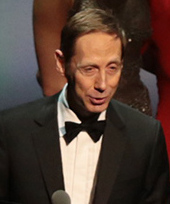
Nick Knight (pictured in 2015) shot the song's cover artwork, as well as its music video.

On February 8, 2011, Gaga tweeted the words "Trois Jours" ("Three Days"), along with a picture of the official single artwork, via TwitPic. Gaga is shown topless in the black-and-white cover art and displays the tattoos on her back. Her hair is air-blown and she wears heavy make-up while sharp edges protrude from her face and shoulders. The artwork was designed by Gaga and her longtime stylist, Nicola Formichetti and was photographed by Nick Knight. It was described by Charlie Amter from The Hollywood Reporter as harkening back to the classic record covers from the 1980s. He compared it to the artworks by bands like Missing Persons, Roxy Music and Duran Duran. Tanner Stransky from Entertainment Weekly gave a positive review of the cover art, feeling that Gaga looked almost "animalistic" in the picture, and her flowing hair made her look like a creature from the African jungle. She also added that the artwork was "totally and completely fierce". Archana Ram from the same publication found similarities between the "Born This Way" cover art and Kylie Minogue's cover art for her 2007 single "2 Hearts". Nicole Eggenberger from OK! described the artwork as a perfect balance between the singer's "wild side" and her "glamorous" looks. Leah Collins from Dose believed that the extreme make-up and tattoos were an ironic play on the title of the song.

Gaga had sung a few lines from the song while accepting the 2010 MTV Video Music Award for Video of the Year, for "Bad Romance". Given as a Christmas gift to her fans, Gaga announced, via Twitter, the release dates of the album and the lead single at the stroke of midnight on New Year's Day, 2011. The single was dated to be released on February 13, 2011, while the album on May 23, 2011. Supplementing this announcement came a black-and-white photograph in which Gaga, according to Jocelyn Vena from MTV, is "nude from the waist down, with her hair blowing about, and sporting a jacket with 'Born This Way' emblazoned in what looks like bedazzled jewels." In late January 2011, Gaga released the lyrics of the song, before announcing that she planned to release the single two days prior to its stipulated date. Hence the song was premiered on radio stations worldwide at 6 a.m. EST on February 11, 2011, and was released for digital download from online retailers at 9 a.m. EST the same day.

== Composition and lyrics ==
"Born This Way" was written and composed by Gaga and Jeppe Laursen (formerly of the band Junior Senior), with the arrangement was held by Gaga and Fernando Garibay. Gaga and Laursen produced the track with Paul Blair (a.k.a. DJ White Shadow) and Garibay, while it was recorded and mixed at Abbey Road Studios in London and Germano Studios in New York. The electropop and house song begins with Gaga's voice uttering the line "It doesn't matter if you love him or capital H-I-M" on a loop, backed by a rumbling synth sound and a humming bass. As the synths change into a beat, Gaga belts out the song's first verse, followed by the bass dropping off and the percussion-backed chorus, "I'm beautiful in my way, 'cause God makes no mistakes; I'm on the right track, baby, I was born this way", which Jocelyn Vena from MTV likened as being "meant to be heard in a big space. It's fast and hard-hitting." After the chorus, she chants the line "Don't be a drag, Just be a queen", making a reference to drag queens, a number of times on top of handclaps, before moving to the second verse. After the second chorus, a rap interlude and bridge follows, where Gaga chants the names of various communities. Sal Cinquemani from Slant Magazine felt that the interlude is a mixture of the music from American television show, Glee, and the song "There But For the Grace of God Go I" by Machine. The music fades out for a moment as Gaga continues to sing, before the addition of an organ and Gaga closes the song. According to the sheet music published at Musicnotes.com by Sony/ATV Music Publishing, "Born This Way" is written in the time signature of common time, with a moderate dance beat tempo of 124 beats per minute. It is composed in the key of F-sharp major (in the F♯ Mixolydian mode) as Gaga's voice spans the tonal nodes of F♯_{3} to C♯_{5}. "Born This Way" follows a chord progression of F♯_{5}–F♯–E–B–F♯ in the chorus.

"Born This Way"
A 26-second sample of "Born This Way" containing the rap and the latter part of the bridge which contains the lyrics featuring the names of different communities.

The lyrics during the verses talk about empowerment, while the chorus talks about making no apologies and accepting one as themselves. It features the names of LGBTQ and other minority communities, which was due to the support Gaga had received from the community over the years. She also explained that since The Fame (2008) and The Fame Monster (2009) did not directly address those communities, "Born This Way" was her chance to create something that not only supported her political and social beliefs, but also empowered her to artistically say, "'I'm not being safe with this record.' I'm not trying to gain new fans. I love the fans I already have, and this is for them."

After the early release of the lyrics, it had garnered criticism from some Asian and Hispanic communities, including Latino groups MECha and Chicanos Unidos Arizona. Radio stations in Malaysia chose to censor the part of the lyrics dealing with the acceptance of the LGBTQ community, due to censorship in the country of content that may be deemed offensive. In response, Gaga urged her Malaysian fans, who wanted the uncensored version to be played, to take action by stating: "It is your job and it is your duty as young people to have your voices heard. You must do everything that you can if you want to be liberated by your society. You must call, you must not stop, you must protest peaceably."

== Remixes ==
A number of remixes were commissioned by Interscope Records, to accompany the song. The first set of remixes were done by LA Riots, Chew Fu and DJ White Shadow. Titled Born This Way – The Remixes Part 1, the remixes were released as CD single and digital download on March 15, 2011. Another set of remixes were done by Michael Woods, Grum, Dada Life, Zedd, Bimbo Jones and Twin Shadow. It was released on March 25, 2011, for digital download only, with the name Born This Way – The Remixes Part 2.

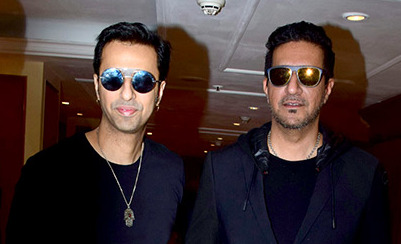
Indian music producer duo Salim and Sulaiman Merchant created a Bollywood remix of "Born This Way".

Gaga released a "Country Road Version" of the song on March 15, 2011, via her Twitter account. The version opens with the sound of guitars and then introduces a fuzzed-out slide guitar and a bluesy harmonica by Tim Harris, with the original disco beats replaced by restrained brush drumming and a more laid-back vibe. Once the first chorus starts, the song chugs alongside the harmonica sounds. Just before the three-minute mark, Gaga sings new lyrics, "If I wanna make it country, baby, then it's OK, cuz I was born, I was born, I was born this way," over a picked mandolin. According to Gil Kaufman of MTV, the song breaks into full-on country-rock mode, reminiscent of late-period Bon Jovi music, in the final minute. A portion of the money earned from sales of "Country Road Version" went to the Gay, Lesbian and Straight Education Network (GLSEN).

An Indian version of the song was done by Indian music producer duo Salim and Sulaiman Merchant. The remix was released on DesiHits.com, a website for South Asian music and entertainment news. The Merchants were discussing music projects with Anjula Acharia-Bath of DesiHits.com, when they came to learn that Gaga, who did not have much reach within the Indian diaspora, was interested in a Bollywood remix for "Born This Way". The Merchants were contacted by Gaga's manager, Troy Carter, and the remix was finalized. Sulaiman explained that they received Gaga's raw vocals from "Born This Way", and using it as a base, they designed the remix. "We sent her a rough cut of our composition for initial feedback on whether we were giving it the right groove. She loved it and that's how we went about it," he added. The Merchants used a number of Indian musical instruments like the duggi, sitar by Sunil Das, and the dhol and dholak in the chorus. Salim said that he sang a little bit of alaap to give the remix a Sufi touch, "as that's the kind of music we do and it was also about adding our signature." Gaga's management team were satisfied with their remix and wanted them to do another remix of her next song, "Judas". The Bollywood remixes were a part of the Indian track list of Born This Way.

== Critical reception ==
"Born This Way" received acclaim from music critics upon its release. Michael Cragg from The Guardian called the song an "almost disco anthem", and said the chorus "crashes in with the weight of a discarded meat dress". He also felt that the "campness" of the music made the lyrics sound less serious than it is. Guthrie Graves-Fitzsimmons of The Washington Post stated that "Born This Way" was a "hymn for LGBTQ Christians". Rick Florino of Artistdirect gave the song five out of five stars and labeled it as "an immediate pop classic", complimenting the hook and the chorus. Alison Schwartz from People added that "the club-ready anthem, complete with a few a cappella chants and Italian lyrics, shows off Gaga's powerhouse vocal chords—and knack for powerful songwriting." Jem Aswad from Billboard responded positively to the anthemic nature of the song, and felt that it would become a staple song to be played on the radio and dancefloors in the following months. Nick Levine of Digital Spy gave the song five out of five stars, describing it as a "life-affirming equality anthem, a straight-up club pumper and a flat-out fantastic pop song." Writing for Slant Magazine, Sal Cinquemani understood that Gaga "has tapped into something truly special, maybe even important." He also complimented the song's underlying message of equality. Meghan Casserly of Forbes expected "Born This Way" to be the biggest gay anthem ever, since, according to her, it was written with that purpose in mind, and she also points out that it is "the next girl power song". Annie Yuan of The Hollywood Reporter labeled the song "a hodge-podge of other pop tunes." Kevin O'Donnell of Spin gave a mixed review, pointing out lyrical similarities to Michael Jackson's "Black or White" (1991). He added that seeing the hype surrounding the project, he expected Gaga to release a song "as epic and instantly classic as the Beatles' 'A Day in the Life' or Queen's 'Bohemian Rhapsody'. Imagine what she'd come up with if she'd spent more than ten minutes writing [the song]."

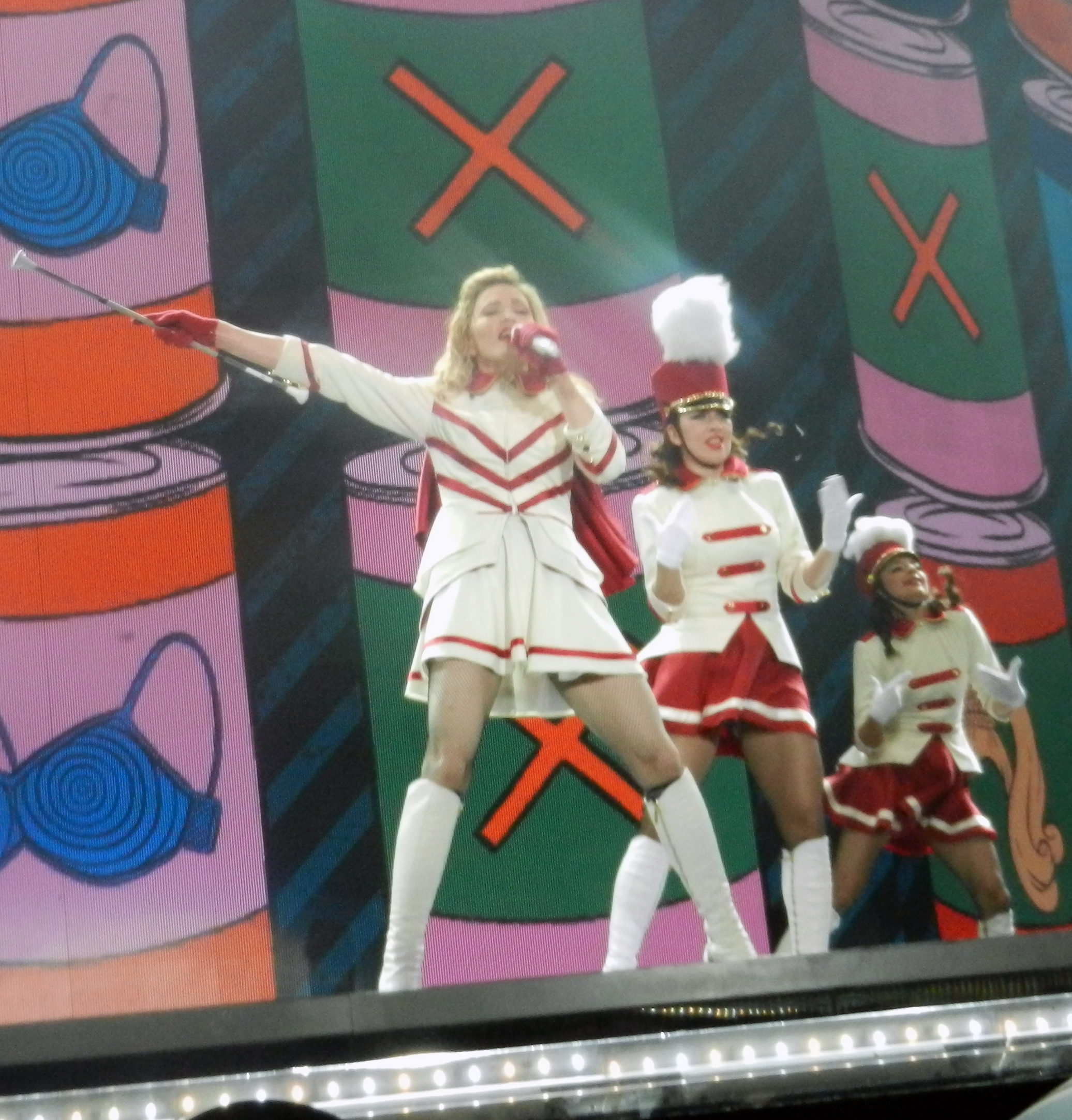
Madonna performing a mashup of her 1989 single "Express Yourself" and "Born This Way" during the MDNA Tour (2012). "Born This Way" was compared by some critics to Madonna's song, which Gaga said was completely unintentional.

Many critics noted similarities between "Born This Way" and Madonna's 1989 song, "Express Yourself", referring to "similar chords, same uplifting, girl-power theme (...), same tempo". Rob Sheffield of Rolling Stone acknowledged the influences of Madonna but pointed out that they would not overshadow the song, as it "[summed] up all the complex Gaga mythos, all her politics and Catholic angst and smeared lipstick, in one brilliant pop blast." Caryn Ganz, while writing for Yahoo! Music, criticized "Born This Way", stating that the song was "overworked, overwrought, noisy, cheesy, and very, very derivative." She specifically noted the similarities to songs like "When Love Takes Over" (2009), "Waterfalls" (1995), and three of Madonna's songs: "Express Yourself", "Ray of Light" (1998), and "Vogue" (1990). Megan Friedman from Time and Marissa Moss from The Huffington Post summarized their reaction as "mixed", due to the similarities they found with "Express Yourself". Neil McCormick of The Daily Telegraph noted that the imitative nature of the song would affect perceptions of Gaga's artistry, since "Born This Way" was "[basically] a reworking of Madonna's 'Express Yourself' with a touch of 'Vogue', which is a bit too much Madonna for someone who is trying to establish her own identity as the, er, new Madonna." The song has also attracted some academic attention: Juliet A. Williams, Professor of Gender studies UCLA, mentioning Madonna's "Express Yourself" and Judith Butler's Gender Trouble, points out its post-essentialist feminist message.

Ann Powers of the Los Angeles Times concluded that "Born This Way" had an entirely different message from the Madonna songs it was being compared to and further defended it by saying, "Whether its sound comes too close to one or another Madonna song seems beside the point; what current pop hit doesn't go green by recycling something familiar?". Gaga herself addressed the comparisons on The Tonight Show with Jay Leno, explaining that she had received an e-mail from Madonna's representatives, who had mentioned their support for "Born This Way". "If the Queen says it shall be, then it shall be," she added. CNN later reported that Madonna's representatives were not aware that the singer, or her team, had sent Gaga an e-mail regarding the situation. Two months later, while getting interviewed by NME magazine, Gaga further addressed the comparisons to "Express Yourself":

Why would I try to put out a song and think I'm getting one over everybody? That's retarded. I will look in your eyes and tell you that I'm not dumb enough or moronic enough to think that you are dumb or moronic enough not to see that I would have stolen a melody. If you put the songs next to each other, side by side, the only similarities are the chord progression. It's the same one that has been in disco music for the last 50 years. Just because I'm the first fucking artist in 25 years to think of putting it on Top 40 radio, it doesn't mean I'm a plagiarist, it means I'm fucking smart. Sorry.

When interviewed by ABC News in 2012, Madonna was asked about the similarities between "Born This Way" and "Express Yourself", stating: "When I heard ['Born This Way'] on the radio ... I said, 'that sounds very familiar' ... It felt reductive." She also came to report to the Newsweek Daily Beast Company what she had in mind when she heard "Born This Way": "I thought, 'What a wonderful way to redo my song'. I mean, I recognised the chord changes. I thought it was... interesting."

In a 2021 review of Born This Way The Tenth Anniversary, Owen Myers of Pitchfork stated that, "of the whole record, it's the song that has aged least well, both for its essentialist message and dated electropop." He went on to reference Owen Pallett's 2014 article for Slate, saying that "its major-key composition was a departure from the 'sexy, spooky' minor-key songwriting of Gaga's biggest hits. In an aim to reach everyone, she broke from her own winning formula. In 2011, the unsubtle 'Born This Way' may have been what the world needed, and it's intensely meaningful to many queer people—including Gaga, who has the phrase tattooed on her left thigh." He concluded by expressing a wish that "a better song had become the de facto soundtrack to LGBTQ+ rights in the Obama era." In 2023, Rolling Stone named "Born This Way" the Most Inspirational LGBTQ Song of All Time, claiming that "few artists have had the kind of impact on the LGBTQ community as Lady Gaga, and few songs have fully captured the joy and resilience of the community as this one".

== Commercial performance ==
I can't believe it. I'm humbled, honored and overwhelmed at the reception to 'Born This Way'. This has been so life-changing for me. Between Billboard and the international No. 1s, and the radio numbers... I couldn't be more blessed to have the fans I have. I knew when I wrote the song it was special, but I also knew that perhaps my fans or my label were hoping for me to deliver 'Bad Romance the Third' or 'Poker Face the Third'. I wanted to do exactly the opposite.

— Gaga talking to Billboard about the commercial reception of "Born This Way".

In the United States, "Born This Way" debuted at number one on the Billboard Hot 100 chart, for the issue dated February 26, 2011, as well as becoming Gaga's third number one single. "Born This Way" became the nineteenth song to debut at number one on the Hot 100, and the 1000th number one single in the chart's history. The song sold 448,000 digital downloads in three days, the most downloads in a first week by a female artist, beating the previous record held by Britney Spears' "Hold It Against Me" (2011). The record would be later broke by Taylor Swift's "We Are Never Ever Getting Back Together" when it sold 623,000 digital copies in its debut week in the week ending September 1, 2012. "Born This Way" remained at the top the following week, selling another 509,000 copies in its first full week of release, and becoming the first song to enter the Hot 100 at number one and hold that position for a second week since Clay Aiken's "This Is The Night" in 2003. Subsequently, the song held the number one spot for six weeks making it the only song to debut at number one and stay there for over a month since Elton John's "Candle in the Wind 1997" in 1997.

"Born This Way" went on to break the record for the fastest selling song in iTunes history, selling a million copies worldwide in five days. The song's CD single sold 24,000 copies in its first week of release and a total of 40,000 copies till March 2011. "Born This Way" sold 3.47 million digital copies in 2011 and became the tenth-best-selling song of the year in the United States. It is her eighth consecutive song to top the two million mark, and her sixth song to reach three million downloads. As of February 2019, it has sold 4.3 million digital downloads in the US.

"Born This Way" debuted at number 14 on the Billboard Pop Songs chart with 4,602 plays after three days of availability, the highest detections total by a debuting song in the chart's history. It was the second-highest debut on that chart, behind Mariah Carey's "Dreamlover" (1993) which debuted at number 12. In its seventh week on the chart, "Born This Way" reached the top, becoming Gaga's seventh number-one song there, thus tying her with Pink and Rihanna as the artist's with the most number one songs on the chart. In addition, the song broke the overall airplay debut record with a first week audience of 78.5 million, entering at number six on the Radio Songs chart; this feat surpassed Janet Jackson's "All for You" (2001) which had debuted at number nine with an audience of 70 million. "Born This Way" topped the chart after seven weeks, becoming her second number-one radio song after "Paparazzi". "Born This Way" topped the Japan Hot 100 and Hot Dance Club Songs charts, reached top-ten on Latin Pop Airplay and Adult Contemporary, and number 11 on Adult Top 40 charts. "Born This Way" took the number one position in its debut week in Canada, remaining atop the Canadian Hot 100 for seven weeks.

On February 20, 2011, the single debuted at number one in Australia on the official ARIA Singles Chart, becoming Gaga's third number-one single there, and the highest selling song to debut at the top. "Born This Way" was certified eight times platinum by the Australian Recording Industry Association (ARIA) for shipment of 560,000 copies of the single. The single debuted at number one on the New Zealand RIANZ charts, becoming Gaga's second number-one single there after "Poker Face" (2008). It was certified triple platinum by Recorded Music NZ (RMNZ) for sales of 90,000 equivalent units. In the United Kingdom, "Born This Way" logged first week sales of 60,000 digital copies, landing it at number three on the UK Singles Chart, which became its peak position. It sold 625,000 copies in 2011 in the UK and 1.4 million copies by January 2025, with 81 million streams. Elsewhere, the song was a very commercial success, debuting atop the charts in Austria, Belgium (Flanders), Germany, Spain, Japan, Israel, Mexico, Switzerland, Finland, Slovakia, Poland, Ireland, and the Netherlands while debuting in the top ten in Italy, France (becoming Gaga's eighth top ten in the country at this time), Sweden, Portugal, Greece, Czech Republic and Norway. In addition, it debuted at number-four in Denmark and then moved to the second spot. "Born This Way" had sold 8.2 million digital copies by November 2011 and had become the fifth best-selling digital single of the year, worldwide.

== Music video ==
=== Development ===
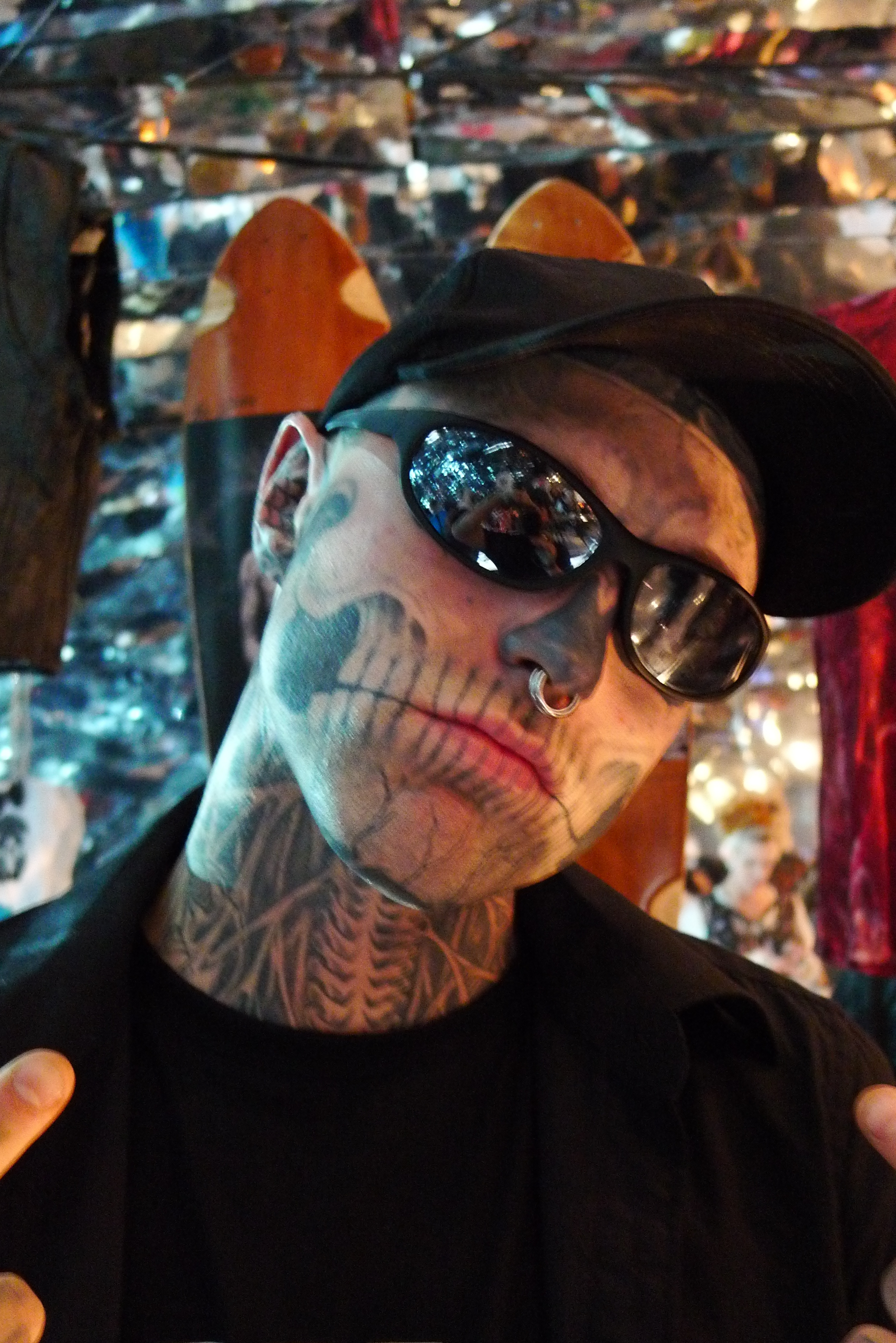
Canadian model Rick Genest appeared in the video.

The music video was shot the weekend of January 22–24, 2011, in New York City and was described by Gaga's team as a "profound, so inspiring and so incredibly beautiful" video. The video was directed by Nick Knight. Choreographer Laurieann Gibson told MTV News that the video would be "shocking" and one can expect the execution of the highest level of vocal music art and dance. Hollywoodlife.com reported that Gaga spent the first week of February editing the video at the Greenwich Hotel, New York, working during the night as she had to spend the morning rehearsing for her upcoming Grammy Awards performance. Media reports suggested that the singer might play the character of Jo Calderone, the male model she had portrayed in the September issue of Japanese Vogue Hommes. Fernando Garibay explained that the video "is of cultural relevance, and hopefully helps people that are an outcast, bullied. Hopefully makes people aware that it's OK to be yourself." According to Gaga, she was inspired by the paintings of Salvador Dalí and Francis Bacon, and their surrealistic images. Gibson explained the inspiration behind the video to MTV News:

When she played it for me, it took me a while to find out the visual interpretation that I could give back to her. And so I woke up one night and I got it, and I said, 'I got it: We have to birth a new race.' From the gate, Gaga was like, 'I want Nick Knight for this video. I want a visual.' She was always birthing something visual in her head, and Nick Knight is just, well, he's prolific but he's so genius. It was about pushing the bar of what a music video should be and can be. [...] It's a different time; it's a different era; there are no limits. It is a viral message. I think that there's something in there for everyone, and that's what's so amazing about the video and so specific about the message.

Gibson recalled having to work with Gaga on her dancing in the video, and to make her a better dancer she wanted Gaga to be confident. Gaga chose New York to shoot the video because the city is her birthplace. Before shooting started, Gibson and Gaga decided there was only one place to work on the avant-garde, modern dance routine for the video, Alvin Alley, where Gibson had studied dance. "We rehearsed there because the choreography is really modern-based. It's, like, more technical than anything she's ever done," she recalled. Shooting also took place in Brooklyn for two days. Since Gaga did not want set pictures to be taken before the video was ready, her team had to hide the location and were successful, except at the last day when paparazzi started sneaking around.

The video features full-bodied tattooed model Rick Genest (Rico), better known by his stage name Zombie Boy. Gaga painted her face in a similar way to Genest, in one of the main series of sequences. She said that the sequences displayed the fact that she would not allow society or critics to dictate her sense of beauty. "I tell you what I think is beauty, and hence the scene was of me and Rico defining ourselves in artistic way and not relying on society to dictate it," she added. The costumes for the video were designed by Formichetti, who blogged about the various designer pieces shown in it. In the opening sequence of the video, Gaga wore a head accessory by Alexis Bittar, a diamond neckpiece by Erickson Beamon with earrings by Pamela Love, and a stained-glass dress by Petra Storrs. Finger rings were provided by Erickson Beamon and chiffon clothes by Thierry Mugler. For the skeletons sequences, both she and Rico wore tuxedos by Mugler while the slime during the orgy scenes were courtesy of Bart Hess. For her Michael Jackson impression in the alley at the video's end, Gaga wore shirt and pants designed by her creative team, the Haus of Gaga, shoes by Natacha Marro, a Billykirk belt and LaCrasia gloves.

=== Synopsis ===
Gaga (center) giving birth to the new race within humanity with the help of a midwife played by Brazilian model Raquel Zimmermann in the music video for "Born This Way"

Released on Monday, February 28, 2011, the video begins with a brief shot of a unicorn's silhouette in a steam-filled alley, inside a pink triangle frame. The triangle transitions to a shot of Gaga, with two opposite facing heads, inspired by Janus, the Roman god of transition and beginnings, sitting in an ornate glass throne amidst a star-filled space. As Bernard Herrmann's prelude to the 1958 film Vertigo plays, Gaga tells the story of the creation of an extraterrestrial race that "bears no prejudice, no judgment, but boundless freedom." Gaga sits in the throne, giving birth to a "new race within the race of humanity." She explains that this was followed by the birth of evil, due to which Gaga splits into two opposing forces of good and evil. Her new half gives birth to a machine gun and fires it. The prologue concludes with Gaga questioning, "How can I protect something so perfect, without evil?"

Gaga, with shoulder and facial protrusions (prosthetic makeup mimicking subdermal implants) walks in a seemingly endless black space, where people are on their hands and knees in an organized pattern. She raises her hand and crouches down to join them. When the first verse begins, everyone dances to choreography. The scenes alternate between the dance, and Gaga singing on her throne in space. In the second verse, Gaga and Rico are in tuxedos, with her face painted to mirror his. Alternating clips show Gaga caressing and attempting to dance with him while he stays expressionless and motionless for the most part. When the chorus plays for the second time, Gaga sings in a room of mirrors, with her head displayed in a glass box among oddly distorted mannequin heads. In the succeeding shots, she is once again shown on her throne giving birth to more members of the new race. After choreographed routines by Gaga and her dancers, they all gather in a circle and embrace in a hug.

In the video's conclusion, Gaga's silhouette struts in an alley in a tribute to Michael Jackson's "The Way You Make Me Feel" music video. Gaga has commented that she was teased as kids would call her "rabbit teeth". She sheds a single tear as the pink triangle frame appears again, and inside it, a silhouette of Gaga sitting atop the unicorn. A city and a rainbow appear in the background, and Gaga is seen in her zombie makeup, chewing bubble gum and blowing it, as the pink triangle zooms away.

=== Reception ===
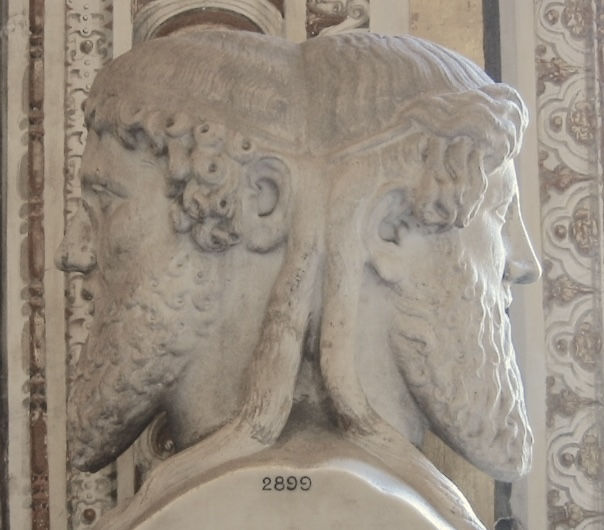
The music video for "Born This Way" featured several references to Greek and Roman mythology, notably Janus (pictured), which was seen at the beginning of the video.

The music video for "Born This Way" was met with generally positive reception among music critics. James Montgomery of MTV praised the overall creationism concept of the music video, adding that it "sort of makes sense, it sort of doesn't, but that 100 percent doesn't really matter much. This is Gaga at her most fabulous, her most out-there, her most, well, Gaga." In conclusion of his review, he wrote that the fantasy aspects of the video is overshadowed by the overall spectacle, which he believed was analogous to Gaga, "after thoroughly dominating this world with 'Born This Way,' [she] seems content to create brand-new worlds to tower over." Myrddin Gwynedd of The New Zealand Herald felt that Gaga's penchant for eccentric and provocative imagery, was extreme in the video. Raphael Chestang from Entertainment Tonight praised the performance of Gaga and her dancers in the video, also complimenting the fashion. Monica Herrera from Billboard noticed that the video bore similarities to the music video of Madonna's "Vogue" and "Borderline" (1984), while believing it to be "more of a high-fashion short film than a conventional music video". Jim Farber from New York Daily News wanted Gaga to add more humor in her videos, adding that although the video had "joyous" shock value, it definitely lacked creativity.

Oscar Moralde from Slant Magazine noted that in the video, "Gaga fully embraces the monstrous as a part of her." Moralde further explained that previously the singer had acknowledged her role as "Mother Monster", but never to the visceral, fully embodied extent that she does in the video. "The things that are monstrous, the things that are different—for Gaga, those are the things that are beautiful," he concluded. Gina Serpe from E! Online criticized it for being a "Madonna rip-off", while Matthew Perpetua of Rolling Stone noted similarities to some of Madonna's work and the imagery from in the 1927 German expressionist film, Metropolis. Ann Powers from Los Angeles Times noted that the video paid tribute to the Goddess movement and feminism. According to her, with the video Gaga made goddess culture accessible to the mass, by portraying images borrowed from fine art, cinema and cool subcultures. Examples given by her included the portrayal of Rico as her partner, instead of a conventional-looking male or female consort. Powers further added that "Gaga has found a way to place female empowerment at the center of her vision without sacrificing the gains she makes by being a daddy's girl or a 'boy toy'." Megan Powers from Time criticized the video and Gaga's usage of shock-imagery, which she still found "strange". The video has been noted for its cultural references and artistic similarities, not only to other recording artists such as Jackson and Madonna, but to Greek and Roman mythology, surrealism and the work of Swiss painter H. R. Giger and late fashion designer Alexander McQueen.

For the 2014 movie Maleficent, the cheekbones makeup of Angelina Jolie was inspired by Gaga's forehead bones in the "Born This Way" music video. Makeup artist Rick Baker explained to Allure that: "I thought it didn't make sense for [Jolie] to have bones like [Gaga's], but she really liked the idea of something under her skin showing a ridge. So I moved them to her cheekbones."

== Accolades ==
At the end of 2011, Slant Magazine listed "Born This Way" as the fifth best song of the year, with Ed Gonzalez from the website commenting that the song is an "unmistakable landmark pop-cultural moment, a post-irony, post-metaphor, pansexual celebration, aimed squarely at the audience that probably needs it the most." It also placed the same rank on the list by MTV, with Gil Kaufman from the channel saying that the song and the music video "added to Gaga's mind-tripping visual canon and further established her as one of the biggest triple threats in music." PopMatters listed it at position 73 on their list of "The 75 Best Songs of 2011", with Sean McCarthy from the website saying that although Born This Way "is a labor to listen to because of its over-the-topness. No such problems exist with the title track. All of the Gaga's strengths on her one-hour monolith are condensed into a four-minute unstoppable ode to the outcasts of the world." Furthermore, The Guardian listed "Born This Way" as the 18th best song of 2011.

The video won two awards at the 2011 MTV Video Music Awards, in the categories of Best Female Video and Best Video With a Message. Along with the song winning the 2011 MTV Europe Music Award for Best Song, Gaga won also the award for Best Video with "Born This Way" at the same event. The song also set a world record at the Guinness World Records as the "Fastest-selling Single" on iTunes, with over a million copies sold in five days since its release.

== Live performances ==
=== 2011 Grammys and The Monster Ball ===
Gaga first performed "Born This Way" live on February 13, 2011, at the 53rd Annual Grammy Awards. She arrived at the ceremony in a giant incubating vessel that was carried onto the red carpet by numerous fashion models. She later emerged from another bigger egg on stage, dressed in a high ponytail, gold bra top and long skirt, with black and gold makeup and pointed shoulders and horns protruding from her face. The "Born This Way" performance was introduced by Ricky Martin. In the first few seconds after performing the intro of the song, Gaga emerged from the egg, and after the first chorus, she whipped her hair in a manner similar to singer Willow Smith. Before the "No matter gay, straight or bi" line of the song, an organ emerged from the stage floor. Gaga played the music on the organ, which was surrounded by mannequin heads submerged in gel, before belting out the rest of the bridge as her dancers surrounded her. Before leaving the stage, Gaga put on her trench and hat as the song faded out and Gaga and her dancers ended the performance with their hands put up in paws.

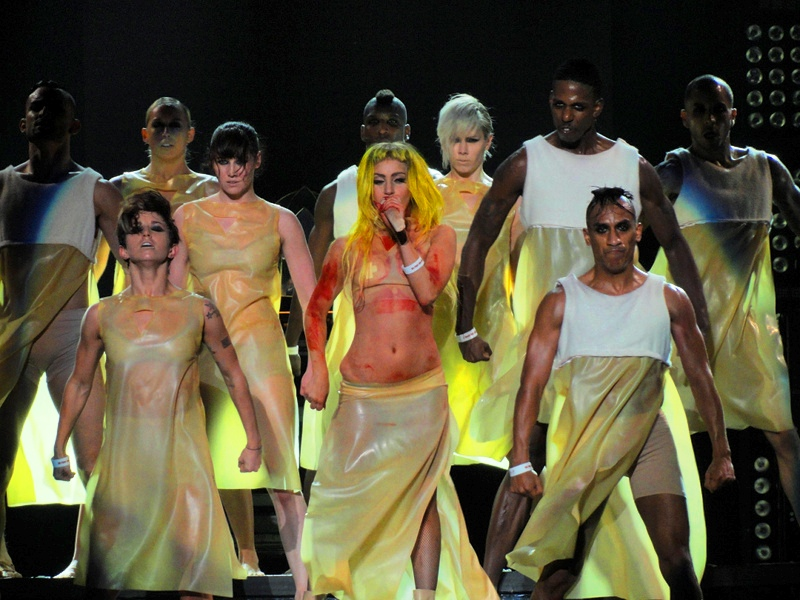
Gaga performing "Born This Way" on The Monster Ball Tour, which was added to the setlist for its 2011 dates. The same general attire and choreography were used as for the Grammy performance.

According to Gaga the Grammy performance was inspired by many things, including Gregorian music, Alvin Ailey dance moves and Martha Graham's dance energy. On The Tonight Show with Jay Leno, she explained that Smith inspired her to "whip my hair back and forth on stage," referring to Smith's similar named song. Gaga continued that the incubating vessel was meant to signify an artistic statement of birthing a new race with no prejudice. The idea occurred to her when she was in Amsterdam on her tour bus, and was thinking about birth and embryos. She had thought to herself, "Gosh, the thing I hate most about doing award shows is, it can be distracting... I want to exist only for my fans and for the stage. I don't want to exist in this machine or this circus that is the industry. I wish I could be encapsulated for three days and just think only about my performance, think only about the album, think only about the future of my fans. So that's what I did."

Jocelyn Vena from MTV felt that the performance was "surprisingly" sparse compared to Gaga's previous "over-the-top" endeavors. Soraya Roberts from New York Daily News was disappointed with the "highly expected" performance, feeling that it had copied Madonna and her Blond Ambition World Tour choreography. Jason Lipscultz from Billboard described the performance as "spirited", and felt that Gaga's appearance inside the egg was one of the memorable moments of the Grammy Awards. Jennifer Armstrong from Entertainment Weekly praised the performance saying that although there were definite influences of Madonna in it, the performance was one of the highlights of the show. Matthew Perpetua from Rolling Stone concurred that "It should come as no surprise that Lady Gaga's performance of her new single 'Born This Way' was the evening's most visually stunning and bizarre spectacle."

Starting from the February 19, 2011, date of The Monster Ball Tour, Gaga performed "Born This Way" as a second encore to the show, using the same general attire and choreography as the Grammy performance, however the incubation vessel was not present and slight alterations were made in the outfits of her dancers. Tris McCall from The Star-Ledger was most impressed with the performance, calling it one of the highlights of the concert. He added that the "reinterpretation of the single, which was far more Laura Nyro than Madonna, was such an improvement over the mechanized, tricked-out hit version that it was hard not to wish she could get back to the studio and re-cut it before the album comes out."

=== Other performances ===
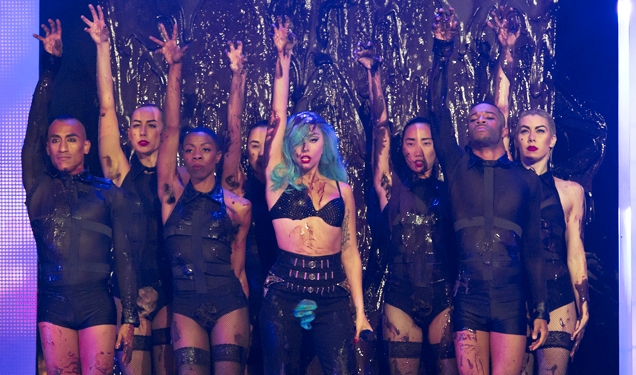
The performance of "Born This Way" at the 2011 MuchMusic Video Awards ended with Gaga and her dancers' hands put up in paws, a signature move for many of the song's live presentations.

Gaga performed an acoustic version on The Oprah Winfrey Show, in May 2011, along with another song from Born This Way, "You and I". Sitting atop a high stool, Gaga—in a red leather blazer, a floppy mask-like hat and see-through leopard bodysuit—played a piano made out of a wire high-heel structure. At The Graham Norton Show in May 2011, Gaga performed "Born This Way" as the closing song of the show, while on Radio 1's Big Weekend in Carlisle, Cumbria it was the opening song of the set list. Another performance took place at the season finale of Saturday Night Live, where the singer wore a metallic dress and a side ponytail. Midway through her performance, she displayed a pregnant belly as she emerged from within her dancers. A few days later, Gaga performed the song on Good Morning America as a part of their "Summer Concert Series". She wore gold horns and a gold sequined jacket, and near the end of the performance she joined her dancers in a tank filled with 1,800 pounds (820 kg) of dyed gel.

During a promotional visit in Europe in June 2011, piano versions of the song was performed on the final show of the sixth season of Germany's Next Topmodel, and at the EuroPride 2011 in Rome. A medley of "Judas" and "Born This Way" was the closing performance on the Paul O'Grady Live show in London. Gaga closed the 2011 MuchMusic Video Awards with "Born This Way", appearing on stage inside a hanging cocoon. While touring Japan, "Born This Way" was performed along with "The Edge of Glory" on the 2011 MTV Video Music Aid Japan. After finishing performing "The Edge of Glory", she sneaked around the stage, and climbed some stairs to reach her piano—which was decked up to look like a giant spider—before launching into an acoustic version of "Born This Way".

The song was included on the Born This Way Ball tour (2012–2013), during which she came out screaming from a giant alien womb. Gaga was dressed in Medieval inspired cloths similar to her performance of the song at the Grammys. In 2014, Gaga performed an acoustic version of "Born This Way" during her residency show at Roseland Ballroom and at the ArtRave: The Artpop Ball tour. In July 2016, Gaga visited an orphanage in Cabo San Lucas, Mexico, where she sang an acoustic version of the song described as "emotional" by Megan McCluskey from Time. Later that year, she appeared in the Carpool Karaoke segment of The Late Late Show with James Corden, where "Born This Way" was between the selected songs Gaga sang with Corden in the vehicle.

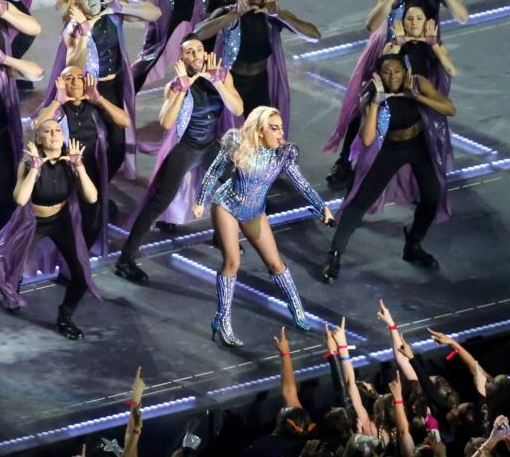
Gaga performing "Born This Way" at her Super Bowl LI halftime show set. It was noted for being the first time someone referenced the LGBTQ community during a halftime show of the sport event.

On February 5, 2017, Gaga was the headliner of the Super Bowl LI halftime show and "Born This Way" was part of the performance. Nico Lang from Salon noted that compared to other songs performed during the event, which were mostly shortened into a medley, Gaga chose to perform the biggest part of "Born This Way", and "her singing its lyrics made Gaga the first person to ever say the words 'lesbian', 'gay', 'bi', or 'transgender' at the Super Bowl." Many other journalists highlighted the significance of singing the song at the Super Bowl, calling it a subtle political statement. In April 2017, Gaga performed "Born This Way" during both weeks of the Coachella Festival. The song was also part of the Joanne World Tour (2017–2018). After singing songs on the piano, Gaga strapped on a long white skirt for the performance of "Born This Way".

Gaga performed "Born This Way" during her Las Vegas residency (2018–2021), which involved two different shows. During the Enigma shows, Gaga performed it as the penultimate song in a champagne-hued gold dress, while on the Jazz and Piano show, she sang it while playing on the piano. Chris Willman, from Variety reacted positively to her latter performance, saying that "Born This Way" "should have been born this way, the way she sings it alone at the piano, as a sort of slow gospel number; it no longer sounds like a kicky 'Vogue' knockoff but something more primal and spiritual, and it's surprisingly moving in this more reverent frame." A stripped-down version of the song was also performed during Gaga's live-streamed concert on September 30, 2021, which was in celebration of her second collaborative album with Tony Bennett, called Love for Sale.

In 2022, Gaga performed "Born This Way" at The Chromatica Ball stadium tour, where she started with just a spotlight and a piano, before switching to the original version of the song after the first verse and chorus. "Born This Way" was also performed during her 2025 promotional concerts for the album Mayhem, which included a headlining set at Coachella, as well as The Mayhem Ball tour (2025–2026).

== Other versions and covers ==
On the February 9, 2011, episode of The Ellen DeGeneres Show, singers Justin Bieber and James Blunt performed their own rendition of the song along with DeGeneres, improvising the music, while singing the chorus. On March 3, 2011, during her concert in Toronto, Canada,–as part of The Monster Ball Tour– Gaga performed an acoustic version of the song with ten-year-old Maria Aragon. Gaga had been impressed by Aragon's singing abilities when the ten-year-old uploaded her own version of "Born This Way" to YouTube. Aragon was subsequently invited on stage to sing with Gaga. She appeared wearing a fedora hat and carrying a stuffed monkey. Gaga sat at the piano, pulled Aragon onto her lap, before proceeding to sing a soul-inspired rendition of "Born This Way", trading off verses. "Maria represents what this song is all about," Gaga told the Canadian crowd after the performance. "It's all about the next generation and the future." Later, Aragon was invited at Radio Hot 103, where she sang the chorus of "Born This Way" through the phone. She also performed the song on The Ellen DeGeneres Show on February 23, 2011. Fellow American singer Katy Perry performed a stripped-down version of "Born This Way", on the March 7, 2011, date of her California Dreams Tour, in Paris. The performance was accompanied by two guitarists playing acoustic guitars.

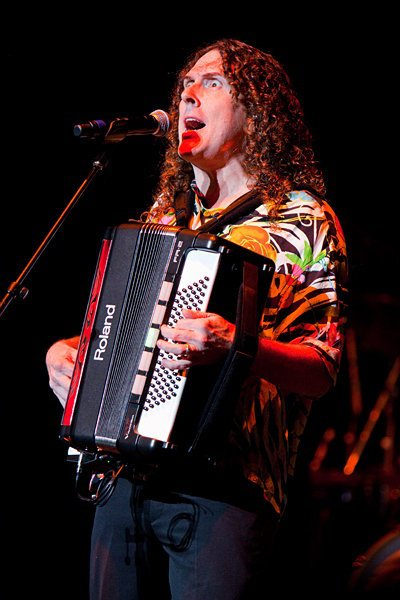
The song has been covered by multiple artists, including "Weird Al" Yankovic, who parodied it in his single, "Perform This Way".

The Glee cast covered the song during a thematic episode of their second season. The episode was named "Born This Way", and aired in the United States in April 2011, on Fox. Their version of the song was released for digital download, and sold 73,000 copies to enter the Billboard Hot 100 at number 44, and on the Canadian Hot 100 at number 31. Later, the Glee cover version was performed at the 2011 leg of the Glee Live! In Concert! tour, the song also was included on the concert-film Glee: The 3D Concert Movie and the original soundtrack.

American singer-songwriter and parodist "Weird Al" Yankovic had sought permission from Gaga to parody "Born This Way", providing a brief description of the concept for his song. Her management responded that she must hear the song before providing approval. Yankovic obliged with the lyrics of "Perform This Way", which was released on April 25, 2011, as the first single from his thirteenth studio album, Alpocalypse, on iTunes Store. After what Yankovic described as "considerable expense" in writing, recording, and mastering the song in the studio, he contacted Gaga's management again with a completed recording of the song. He was subsequently refused permission, without Gaga listening to the track and Yankovic getting the impression that the refusal came from the singer herself. Left with a completed song and abandoned plans for an outlandish music video to promote the song and album, Yankovic released it on YouTube. It was then that Gaga actually heard the song, and personally contacted Yankovic, giving him green light to include the song on Alpocalypse, telling him that her manager had been the one to refuse permission, which was done without her knowledge or input.

BBC Radio 1's Alex Full a.k.a. the Cornish Fairy and singer Kirsten Joy Gill recorded a cover of the song called "Cornish This Way" in August 2011 as a modern Cornish anthem. The song was recorded at the Maida Vale Studios in London, and the music video was shot in Newquay, Cornwall at the Boardmasters Festival. On May 20, 2012, a video leaked from rehearsals of Madonna's the MDNA Tour (2012) showed the singer incorporating "Born This Way" into "Express Yourself" followed by a performance of "She's Not Me" from her 2008 album Hard Candy. It created a media frenzy with many speculating that she was "dissing" Gaga and the song. Madonna included the sequence in her tour during the second segment. Alice Cooper added a cover of the song to the 2012 leg of his No More Mr. Nice Guy Tour. It features altered lyrics, though it maintains the chorus and melody of Gaga's version. Later, Gaga showed appreciation for the cover on her Twitter account. In 2021, South African country musician Orville Peck covered the country road version of the song for the tenth anniversary edition of Born This Way.

== Track listing and formats ==
Digital download

1. "Born This Way" – 4:20

Born This Way – The Remixes Part 1

1. "Born This Way" (LA Riots Remix) – 6:32
2. "Born This Way" (Chew Fu Born to Fix Remix) – 5:52
3. "Born This Way" (DJ White Shadow Remix) – 4:24

Born This Way – The Remixes Part 2

1. "Born This Way" (Michael Woods Remix) – 6:24
2. "Born This Way" (Dada Life Remix) – 5:16
3. "Born This Way" (Zedd Remix) – 6:30
4. "Born This Way" (Grum Remix) – 5:48
5. "Born This Way" (Bimbo Jones Club Mix) – 6:46
6. "Born This Way" (Twin Shadow Remix) – 4:06

Limited Edition CD Single/Limited 12" picture disc

1. "Born This Way" – 4:21
2. "Born This Way" (LA Riots Remix) – 6:33
3. "Born This Way" (Chew Fu Born to Fix Remix) – 5:53
4. "Born This Way" (DJ White Shadow Remix) – 4:24

Born This Way (The Country Road Version) – Single

1. "Born This Way" (The Country Road Version) – 4:21

== Credits and personnel ==
Credits adapted from the liner notes of Born This Way.

=== Recording and management ===
- Recorded at Abbey Road Studios (London, England) and Germano Studios (New York City, New York)
- Mixed at Germano Studios (New York City, New York)
- Mastered at Oasis Mastering (Burbank, California)
- Published by Stefani Germanotta P/K/A Lady Gaga (BMI), Sony/ATV Songs LLC, House Of Gaga Publishing Inc., GloJoe Music Inc. (BMI), Sony/ATV Music Publishing, Warner-Tamerlane Publishing Corp. (BMI) and Garibay Music Publishing
- All rights on behalf of itself and Garibay Music Publishing, administered by Warner-Tamerlane Publishing Corp./ Korsbaek Publishing (ASCAP)

=== Personnel ===
- Lady Gaga – vocals (lead and background), lyrics, composition, producer, keyboards, instrumentation, arrangement
- Jeppe Laursen – producer, lyrics, composition
- Fernando Garibay – producer, programming, keyboards, instrumentation, arrangement
- DJ White Shadow – producer, programming
- David Russell – recording and audio mixing
- Gene Grimaldi – audio mastering
- Tamar Braxton – backing vocals
- Pete Hutchings – assistant
- Kenta Yonesaka – assistant
- Kevin Porter – assistant
- Al Carlson – assistant

== Charts ==
=== Weekly charts ===
Weekly chart performance for "Born This Way"
Chart (2011–2013)	Peak position
Australia (ARIA)	1
Austria (Ö3 Austria Top 40)	1
Belgium (Ultratop 50 Flanders)	1
Belgium (Ultratop 50 Wallonia)	3
Brazil Hot 100 Airplay (Billboard)	4
Brazil Hot Pop Songs (Billboard)	1
Canada Hot 100 (Billboard)	1
Canada AC (Billboard)	2
Canada CHR/Top 40 (Billboard)	1
Canada Hot AC (Billboard)	1
CIS Airplay (TopHit)	24
Croatia International Airplay (HRT)	1
Czech Republic Airplay (ČNS IFPI)	8
Denmark (Tracklisten)	2
Euro Digital Song Sales (Billboard)	1
Finland (Suomen virallinen lista)	1
France (SNEP)	2
Germany (GfK)	1
Greece Digital Song Sales (Billboard)	1
Greece (Greek Airplay)	4
Hungary (Dance Top 40)	12
Hungary (Rádiós Top 40)	1
Hungary (Single Top 40)	2
Iceland (RÚV)	10
Ireland (IRMA)	1
Israel (Media Forest)	1
Italy Airplay (EarOne)	10
Italy (FIMI)	2
Japan Hot 100 (Billboard)	1
Luxembourg Digital Song Sales (Billboard)	1
Mexico Anglo (Monitor Latino)	1
Netherlands (Dutch Top 40)	1
Netherlands (Single Top 100)	1
New Zealand (Recorded Music NZ)	1
Norway (VG-lista)	2
Poland Airplay (ZPAV)	1
Portugal Digital Song Sales (Billboard)	3
Russia Airplay (TopHit)	35
Scottish Singles Sales (Official Charts)	1
Slovakia Airplay (ČNS IFPI)	1
South Korea (Circle)	33
South Korea Foreign (Circle)	1
Spain (Promusicae)	1
Sweden (Sverigetopplistan)	1
Switzerland (Schweizer Hitparade)	1
UK Singles (Official Charts)	3
Ukraine Airplay (TopHit)	17
US Billboard Hot 100	1
US Adult Contemporary (Billboard)	22
US Adult Pop Airplay (Billboard)	7
US Dance Club Songs (Billboard)	1
US Dance Airplay (Billboard)	1
US Latin Pop Airplay (Billboard)	10
US Pop Airplay (Billboard)	1
US Rhythmic Airplay (Billboard)	12

=== Year-end charts ===
2011 year-end chart performance for "Born This Way"
Chart (2011)	Position
Australia (ARIA)	8
Australia (ARIA Dance)	2
Austria (Ö3 Austria Top 40)	13
Belgium (Ultratop 50 Flanders)	31
Belgium Dance (Ultratop 50 Flanders)	29
Belgium (Ultratop 50 Wallonia)	23
Belgium Dance (Ultratop 50 Wallonia)	19
Brazil (Crowley)	33
Canada (Canadian Hot 100)	6
CIS Airplay (TopHit)	174
Croatia International Airplay (HRT)	19
Denmark (Tracklisten)	30
France (SNEP)	22
Germany (GfK)	17
Greece (IFPI)	84
Hungary (Dance Top 40)	56
Hungary (Rádiós Top 40)	8
Ireland (IRMA)	17
Israel (Media Forest)	40
Italy (Musica e dischi)	25
Italy Airplay (EarOne)	61
Japan (Japan Hot 100)	3
Japan Adult Contemporary (Billboard)	1
New Zealand (Recorded Music NZ)	14
Netherlands (Dutch Top 40)	42
Netherlands (Single Top 100)	28
Poland (ZPAV)	61
Romania (Romanian Top 100)	91
South Korea Foreign (Circle)	4
Spain (PROMUSICAE)	16
Sweden (Sverigetopplistan)	18
Switzerland (Schweizer Hitparade)	12
Taiwan (Hito Radio)	16
UK Singles (Official Charts)	14
Ukraine Airplay (TopHit)	78
US Billboard Hot 100	18
US Adult Pop Airplay (Billboard)	29
US Dance Club Songs (Billboard)	23
US Dance/Mix Show Airplay (Billboard)	38
US Pop Airplay (Billboard)	28
US Radio Songs (Billboard)	40
Worldwide (IFPI)	6

2012 year-end chart performance for "Born This Way"
Chart (2012)	Position
Japan (Japan Hot 100)	75

== Certifications and sales ==
Certifications and sales for "Born This Way"
Region	Certification	Certified units/sales
Australia (ARIA)	8× Platinum	560,000^{‡}
Austria (IFPI Austria)	2× Platinum	60,000^{*}
Belgium (BRMA)	Gold	15,000^{*}
Brazil (Pro-Música Brasil)	Diamond	250,000^{‡}
Canada (Music Canada)	9× Platinum	720,000^{‡}
Denmark (IFPI Danmark)	Platinum	30,000^{^}
Germany (BVMI)	Platinum	300,000^{‡}
Italy (FIMI)	2× Platinum	60,000^{*}
Japan (RIAJ)	Million	1,000,000^{*}
New Zealand (RMNZ)	3× Platinum	90,000^{‡}
Norway (IFPI Norway)	6× Platinum	60,000^{*}
South Korea (Gaon)	—	931,673
Spain (Promusicae)	Gold	20,000^{*}
Spain (Promusicae) Since 2015	Gold	30,000^{‡}
Sweden (GLF)	5× Platinum	200,000^{‡}
Switzerland (IFPI Switzerland)	Platinum	30,000^{^}
United Kingdom (BPI)	2× Platinum	1,400,000
United States (RIAA)	6× Platinum	6,000,000^{‡}
Summaries
Worldwide	—	8,200,000
^{*} Sales figures based on certification alone.^{^} Shipments figures based on certification alone.^{‡} Sales+streaming figures based on certification alone.

== Release history ==
Release dates and formats for "Born This Way"
Region	Date	Format(s)	Version	Label	Ref.
Various	February 11, 2011	Digital download	Original	Interscope	
Italy	February 11, 2011	Radio airplay	Original	Universal	
United States	February 15, 2011	Contemporary hit radio	Original	Interscope	
United States	February 15, 2011	Rhythmic contemporary radio	Original	Interscope	
Australia	March 4, 2011	CD single	Original	Interscope	
Germany	March 11, 2011	CD single	Original	Interscope	
Greece	March 14, 2011	CD single	Original	Universal	
United Kingdom	March 14, 2011	CD single	Original	Polydor	
Various	March 15, 2011	Digital download	The remixes, pt. 1	Interscope	
New Zealand	March 15, 2011	CD single	Original	Interscope	
United States	March 15, 2011	CD single	Original	Interscope	
Japan	March 16, 2011	CD single	Original	Universal	
Various	March 25, 2011	Digital download	The remixes, pt. 2	Interscope	
Various	March 25, 2011	Digital download	Country road	Interscope	

== See also ==
- List of number-one singles of 2011 (Australia)
- List of number-one hits of 2011 (Austria)
- List of Ultratop 50 number-one singles of 2011
- List of number-one pop hits of 2011 (Brazil)
- List of Canadian Hot 100 number-one singles of 2011
- List of Dutch Top 40 number-one singles of 2011
- List of number-one singles of 2011 (Finland)
- List of number-one hits of 2011 (Germany)
- List of number-one singles of the 2010s (Hungary)
- List of number-one singles of 2011 (Ireland)
- List of Hot 100 number-one singles of 2011 (Japan)
- List of number-one singles from the 2010s (New Zealand)
- List of number-one singles of 2011 (Poland)
- List of number-one singles of 2011 (Spain)
- List of number-one singles of the 2010s (Sweden)
- List of number-one hits of 2011 (Switzerland)
- List of Billboard Hot 100 number ones of 2011
- List of Billboard Mainstream Top 40 number-one songs of 2011
- List of Billboard Dance Club Songs number ones of 2011
- List of number-one dance airplay hits of 2011 (U.S.)
