= Stephanie Cutter =

American lawyer and political consultant (born 1968)

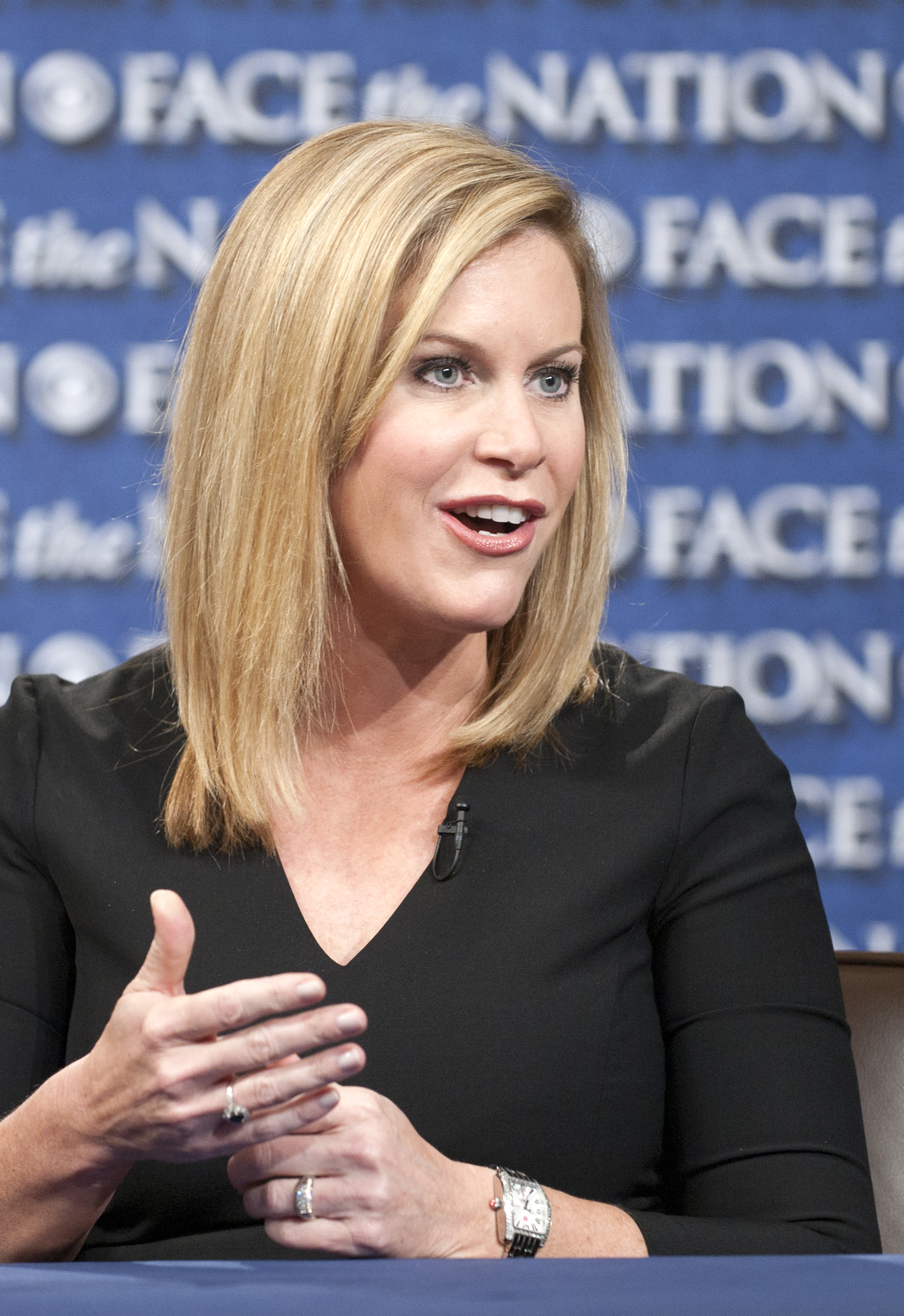
- Cutter on Face the Nation in 2012

Personal details
- Born: October 22, 1968 (age 57) Taunton, Massachusetts, U.S.
- Party: Democratic
- Education: Smith College (BA); Georgetown University (JD)

Stephanie Cutter (born October 22, 1968) is an American communications and political consultant. She was an advisor to President Barack Obama, President Bill Clinton, First Lady Michelle Obama and Vice President Kamala Harris. She previously worked in campaign and communications roles for other prominent Democrats including Ted Kennedy and John Kerry.

In 2013, she co-founded Precision Strategies, a political consulting firm, with fellow Obama campaign alumni Jen O'Malley Dillon and Teddy Goff. During the 2020 election, she was producer of the all-virtual Democratic National Convention, and following Joe Biden's victory, she was tapped to act as producer of the 2021 inauguration, which included mostly virtual festivities. In 2026, she became an advisor to the gambling platform Kalshi.

== Early life and education ==
Cutter was born in Taunton, Massachusetts, and was raised in nearby Raynham, Massachusetts. She graduated from Bridgewater-Raynham Regional High School in 1986. She received a B.A. degree from Smith College and a J.D. degree from Georgetown Law School.

== Career ==
=== Early career (1990–2007) ===
Cutter began her career working as a junior aide to New York Governor Mario Cuomo prior to joining Bill Clinton's 1992 election campaign. She worked for the Environmental Protection Agency and the Clinton administration, eventually becoming White House deputy communications director. Cutter worked to repair Clinton's image following his impeachment.

Beginning in 2001, she served as Communications Director for Senator Ted Kennedy.

In November 2003, she was named communications director for the John Kerry campaign, at Kennedy's recommendation. After the Kerry campaign, Cutter returned to work for Kennedy. In May 2008, when Kennedy fell ill at his home in Hyannis Port with what would turn out to be a deadly brain tumor, Cutter was the first call Kennedy's wife made after dialing 911.

=== Obama campaign and administration years (2008–2012) ===
Cutter joined Barack Obama's first presidential campaign in 2008 as a senior advisor to Barack Obama and as the chief of staff to Michelle Obama. Cutter has been credited with helping the campaign receive an endorsement from Kennedy and improving Michelle Obama's public reputation during the campaign. Cutter became a trusted aide to both Obamas and in 2009 was named one of the "50 Most Powerful People in D.C." by GQ.

She served as the Chief Spokesperson for the Obama-Biden Transition Project. She served in the Treasury Department as Timothy Geithner's counselor where "she protected Geithner’s fragile reputation and tried to spin unpopular policies like the Troubled Asset Relief Program and the A.I.G. bailout." In May 2009, Cutter was appointed to serve as adviser to President Obama to lead the Supreme Court confirmation of Supreme Court justice Sonia Sotomayor. Later that year, GQ Magazine named Cutter one of the 50 most powerful people in Washington.

In fall of 2009, Cutter was under a fellowship at the Harvard Institute of Politics, when she received a request from Michelle Obama to provide strategic counsel. As part of her role, Cutter helped develop and launch Let's Move!, a public health initiative from the first lady's office.

In 2010, Cutter was named Assistant to the President for Special Projects, charged with managing communications and outreach strategy for the Patient Protection and Affordable Care Act. In 2011, Cutter was named Deputy Senior Advisor to President Barack Obama.

In September 2011, the White House announced Cutter would leave her position as Deputy Senior Advisor to serve as deputy campaign manager for Obama for America. She has appeared in numerous campaign videos and ads for Obama's campaign, as well as a guest in TV appearances. The New York Times described her as "a popular but polarizing face of [Obama's] campaign", and a "soldier who says the things the candidate can't (or won't) say." During the 2012 campaign, Steve Schmidt, a Republican strategist, stated that Cutter is "arguably the strongest player on either side out there now."

=== 2013–present ===
CNN announced on June 26, 2013, that Cutter will join a new version of Crossfire re-launching in the fall of 2013, with panelists Newt Gingrich, S. E. Cupp, and Van Jones. Cutter informed CNN staffers on October 7, 2013, that she was pregnant with her first child. With a due date of early March 2014, she informed the network she would return to Crossfire after maternity leave. She remained with the series until it ended in July of that year. In 2018, Cutter joined ABC News as a contributor, focusing on "political analysis and insight across ABC News programs and live events."

In 2013, Cutter joined the board of the Edward M. Kennedy Institute for the United States Senate. That same year, Cutter joined the University of Chicago Institute of Politics as a founding board member. In 2016, Cutter joined the boards of the Smithsonian Institution's National Zoological Park and Conservation Biology Institute.

In 2013, Cutter co-founded Precision Strategies with Jennifer O'Malley Dillon and Teddy Goff, all of whom had previously worked together on the Barack Obama 2012 presidential campaign team. The consulting firm, based in New York City and Washington, D.C., reportedly worked with a variety of political and private clients, including Justin Trudeau, March for Our Lives, Earthjustice, the Independent Restaurant Coalition, and General Electric. In January 2023, the firm received a minority investment from Abry Partners, a Boston-based private equity firm focused on media, communications and business services.

In 2020, Cutter was the Chief Program Executive for the 2020 Democratic National Convention, held for the first time as a virtual event rather than an in-person gathering due to the COVID-19 pandemic. The following year, President Joe Biden's inauguration was held as a largely-virtual celebration due to COVID-19 virus cases in the United States. Cutter and Ricky Kirshner served as executive producers of the event. Part of the inauguration, Celebrating America, earned Cutter and Kirshner a nomination for the Outstanding Live Variety Special award at the 73rd Primetime Creative Arts Emmy Awards.

In August 2024, campaign officials for Kamala Harris's 2024 presidential campaign announced that Cutter will be senior adviser for strategy messaging. Cutter and Ricky Kirshner served as co-executive producers of the 2024 Democratic National Convention. Cutter developed the strategy and messaging for the convention, which featured an issue-oriented speaker line up and a viral moment by Lil Jon during the roll call vote on Tuesday night.

In April 2026, she joined gambling platform Kalshi as a strategic partner.
