= Celebrating America =

2021 television special following the inauguration of Joe Biden

- Written by: Dave Boone; Jon Macks
- Directed by: Glenn Weiss
- Presented by: Tom Hanks
- Composer: Chris Walden
- Country of origin: United States
- Original language: English

Production
- Executive producers: Stephanie Cutter; Ricky Kirshner; Rod O'Connor; Glenn Weiss
- Producer: Sarah Levine Hall
- Editors: Michael Polito; Chester Contaoi; Ben Folts; Enrique Gutierrez; Brian Kelly; Timothy Schultz
- Production companies: White Cherry Entertainment; Presidential Inaugural Committee

Original release
- Network: ABC, CBS, NBC, PBS, BET, CNN and MSNBC
- Release: January 20, 2021

Celebrating America is a television special which aired as part of the post-inaugural events following the inauguration of Joe Biden on January 20, 2021. Hosted by actor Tom Hanks and produced by Ricky Kirshner, Glenn Weiss, and Stephanie Cutter, the special featured musical performances and speeches from various Americans, including those from President Joe Biden and Vice President Kamala Harris.

The show was nominated in two Primetime Emmy Awards for Outstanding Variety Special (Live) and Outstanding Music Direction.

== Description ==
Harris's speech during the special

Traditional inaugural balls, which often gather hundreds of dignitaries to see the president and extend late into the evening, were not held due to restrictions related to the COVID-19 pandemic. A primetime television special, Celebrating America, aired as a substitute in simulcast across most major television networks and other cable and streaming outlets. Hosted by Tom Hanks, the evening event opened with a performance of "Land of Hope and Dreams" by Bruce Springsteen on the steps of the Lincoln Memorial. Hanks then addressed viewers, emphasizing the "promise of our promised land", and introduced four guests, Kareem Abdul-Jabbar, Dolores Huerta, Brayden Harrington, and Kim Ng who, respectively, recited lines from the inaugural addresses of presidents Abraham Lincoln, Franklin D. Roosevelt, John F. Kennedy, and Ronald Reagan, reflecting on their speeches' emphasis of national unity, confidence, patriotism, and peace.

Anthony Gaskin, a Virginia UPS deliveryman, introduced Jon Bon Jovi, who performed an acoustic rendition of "Here Comes the Sun" by The Beatles. Yo-Yo Ma performed a cello solo sampling "Amazing Grace", "Goin' Home" from Dvořák's 9th symphony, and "Simple Gifts". Biden was then introduced by Hanks to the U.S. Navy Band Brass Ensemble's playing of four ruffles and flourishes and "Hail to the Chief"; he spoke inside the Lincoln Memorial and emphasized the importance of "opportunity, liberty, dignity, and respect". Ant Clemons and Justin Timberlake then performed their song "Better Days" in Memphis, Tennessee. Mackenzie Adams, a Washington elementary school teacher, then introduced Foo Fighters; frontman Dave Grohl opened the performance by acknowledging the "creative ways" educators have dealt with teaching modality challenges during the COVID-19 pandemic, and then the band performed "Times Like These". A cavalcade of Broadway stars performed "Seasons of Love" and "Let the Sunshine In".

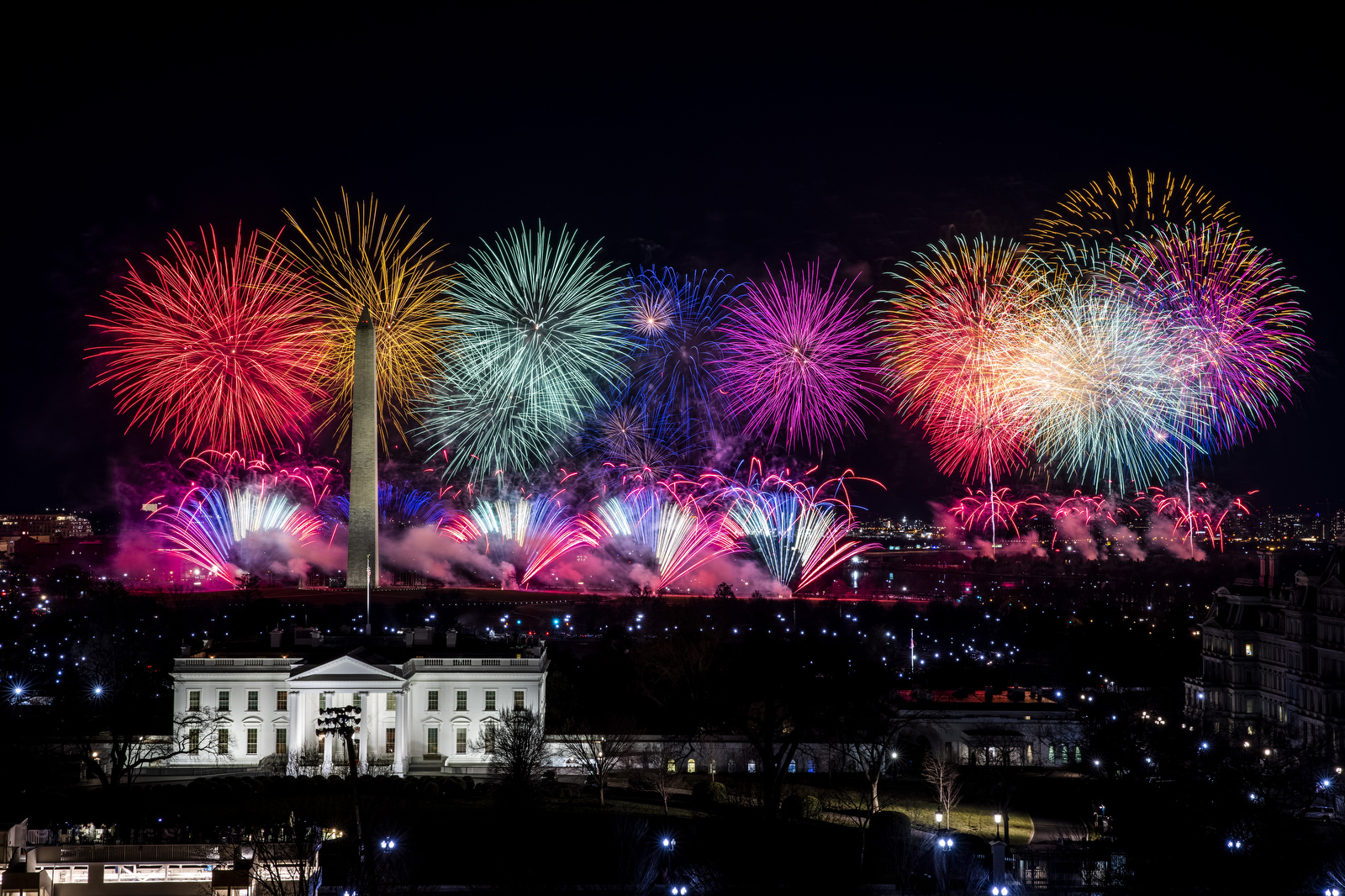
Fireworks from the finale of the program with Katy Perry performing “Firework” at the National Mall.

Chef and philanthropist José Andrés discussed the food insecurity crisis in America, and introduced Morgan Marsh-McGlone, a Wisconsin elementary school student who raised over US$52,000 for the hungry by creating an online lemonade stand. Lin-Manuel Miranda then recited Irish poet Seamus Heaney's "The Cure at Troy", with Biden joining him to in unison recital of the final line, "And hope and history rhyme". It is a poem often quoted by Biden, such as in his address at the 2020 Democratic National Convention. American members of the Expedition 64 mission on the International Space Station then greeted viewers from orbit. Sarah Fuller, the first woman to play in a football game for a Power Five conference team, introduced Vice President Harris to four ruffles and flourishes and "Hail, Columbia"; she characterized the American people as "bold, fearless, and ambitious", exemplifying the Apollo 11 Moon landing and civil rights and women's suffragette movements. John Legend then performed his rendition of "Feeling Good".

Sandra Lindsay, a nurse who is the first U.S. citizen to receive a COVID-19 vaccine, introduced Tyler Hubbard and Tim McGraw, who performed their collaborative song "Undivided" on a Nashville rooftop. Former presidents Clinton, Bush, and Obama, appearing in the Arlington Memorial Amphitheater, remarked on the importance of uniting America and witnessing the peaceful transfer of power; they also offered words of support for Biden and Harris. Demi Lovato then celebrated frontline healthcare workers in their performance of Bill Withers's song "Lovely Day". In closing the special, Katy Perry performed her song "Firework" during a fireworks show over the Washington Monument, with views of Biden, Harris, and their spouses watching from the White House and Lincoln Memorial.

== Appearances ==
=== Speakers ===
Speaker	Description	Location	Notes
Kareem Abdul-Jabbar	Former professional basketball player		Recited a portion of Abraham Lincoln's inaugural address
Dolores Huerta	Labor leader and civil rights activist		Recited a portion of Franklin D. Roosevelt's inaugural address
Brayden Harrington	13-year-old student who spoke about his experience with Joe Biden at the 2020 Democratic National Convention		Recited a portion of John F. Kennedy's inaugural address
Kim Ng	General manager of the Miami Marlins		Recited a portion of Ronald Reagan's inaugural address
Eva Longoria	Actress	Los Angeles, California	
Anthony Gaskin	UPS deliveryman	Midlothian, Virginia	Introduced Jon Bon Jovi
SGT Brennan Lombardo	United States Marine Corps aviation operations specialist	Marine Corps Air Station Iwakuni, Japan	
Joe Biden	President of the United States	Lincoln Memorial in Washington, D.C.	
Cavanaugh Bell	8-year-old boy who started his own food pantry	Gaithersburg, Maryland	Introduced Ant Clemons and Justin Timberlake
Mackenzie Adams	Elementary school teacher	Seattle, Washington	Introduced Foo Fighters
Kerry Washington	Actress	Los Angeles, California	
José Andrés	Chef and philanthropist	Washington, D.C.	Introduced Morgan Marsh-McGlone
Morgan Marsh-McGlone	Elementary school student who raised money for the hungry by creating an online lemonade stand.	Belleville, Wisconsin	
Lin-Manuel Miranda	Actor	United Palace in New York City, New York	Recited Seamus Heaney's "The Cure at Troy"
Kathleen Rubins Shannon Walker Victor Glover Michael S. Hopkins	American crew members of Expedition 64	International Space Station	
Sarah Fuller	College football placekicker for the Vanderbilt Commodores	Vanderbilt Stadium in Nashville, Tennessee	Introduced Kamala Harris
Kamala Harris	Vice President of the United States	National Mall in Washington, D.C.	
Sandra Lindsay	Nurse who became the first American to receive a COVID-19 vaccine	New York City, New York	Introduced Tyler Hubbard and Tim McGraw
Bill Clinton George W. Bush Barack Obama	Former presidents of the United States	Arlington Memorial Amphitheater in Arlington County, Virginia	

=== Performances ===
Performer(s)	Song(s)	Location
Bruce Springsteen	"Land of Hope and Dreams"	Lincoln Memorial in Washington, D.C.
Jon Bon Jovi	"Here Comes the Sun"	Miami, Florida
Yo-Yo Ma	"Amazing Grace" "Goin' Home" from Dvořák's 9th symphony "Simple Gifts"	Boston, Massachusetts
Ant Clemons; Justin Timberlake	"Better Days"	Memphis, Tennessee
Black Pumas	"Colors"	Austin, Texas
Foo Fighters	"Times Like These"	
Broadway theatre performers Seth Rudetsky; James Wesley; Ali Stroker; Andy Karl; Anthony Rapp; Audra McDonald; BD Wong; Beth Malone; Betty Buckley; Chandra Wilson; Charlotte d'Amboise; Chita Rivera; Christopher Jackson; Daphne Rubin-Vega; Derrick Baskin; Fredi Walker-Browne; James Monroe Iglehart; Javier Muñoz; Jenna Ushkowitz; Jessie Mueller; Jose Llana; Juli Rudetsky-Wesley; Keala Settle; Laura Benanti; Leslie Uggams; Mandy Gonzalez; Natasha Yvette Williams; Olga Merediz; Orfeh; Peppermint; Renée Elise Goldsberry; Rosie Perez; Ruthie Ann Miles; Vanessa Williams; Wayne Brady; Wilson Heredia	"Seasons of Love" "Let the Sunshine In"	New York City, New York
John Legend	"Feeling Good"	National Mall in Washington, D.C.
DJ Cassidy; Ozuna; Luis Fonsi	"Taki Taki" "Despacito"	Los Angeles, California
Tyler Hubbard; Tim McGraw	"Undivided"	Nashville, Tennessee
Demi Lovato	"Lovely Day"	Los Angeles, California
Katy Perry	"Firework"	National Mall in Washington, D.C.

== Production and broadcast ==
Celebrating America was produced by Ricky Kirshner, Glenn Weiss, and Stephanie Cutter the same team that produced the 2020 Democratic National Convention. It was broadcast on all major television networks, including ABC, CBS, NBC and PBS, as well as cable networks such as BET, CNN and MSNBC. It was also livestreamed online through the Presidential Inaugural Committee's YouTube, Facebook, Twitter and Twitch accounts. Streaming partners for the event include Amazon Prime Video, Microsoft Bing, NewsNow from Fox, DirecTV and AT&T U-verse.

The fireworks display for the program's finales was created by Strictly FX.

== Reception ==
=== Critical response ===
The event was acclaimed by critics, with Caroline Framke of Variety writing that Celebrating America "perfectly encapsulates President Joe Biden". Lily Janiak of the San Francisco Chronicle described the special as "meh TV but fantastic civics" and that it could "help us make ordinariness and kindness normal again." Dominic Patten and Ted Johnson of Deadline Hollywood wrote that Celebrating America proved a "solemn & successful affair" and that it was "a PSA for the USA, and maybe the calming medicine of a message that we and the world needed to hear." Writing for The Independent, Mark Beaumont said that the special made Biden's inauguration "a safe, soothing tribute to anti-fascism."

While he described the special's content as "more the entertainment-politics equivalent of a chain restaurant with a big menu" where "it wasn’t going to be anyone’s favorite, but everyone could find something on the menu for them", chief television critic of The New York Times James Poniewozik wrote that it "promised that daylight is coming" and that "the long, cold, lonely winter would end, and the sun would come."

=== Viewership ===
More than 21 million people watched the television special, with CNN's broadcast being watched by over 6 million people, as part of its overall coverage of the inauguration ceremony. NBC's broadcast of the special was the most watched among the broadcast networks, followed by ABC and CBS. The three networks' telecast of the event competed with Fox's The Masked Dancer and Name That Tune and The CW's Riverdale and Nancy Drew.

Network	Viewers (million)
CNN	6.224
MSNBC	4.518
NBC	3.996
ABC	3.789
CBS	3.101
BET	0.182

Broadcast network

Cable network

== Awards and nominations ==
Year	Award	Category	Nominee(s)	Result	Ref.
2021	Primetime Emmy Awards	Outstanding Variety Special (Live)	Ricky Kirshner, Glenn Weiss, Stephanie Cutter, Rod O'Connor, Rob Paine, Lisa Geers, Sarah Levine Hall and Tom Hanks	Nominated	
2021	Primetime Creative Arts Emmy Awards	Outstanding Music Direction	Rickey Minor	Nominated	
