= Play Like a Girl =

Nonprofit organization

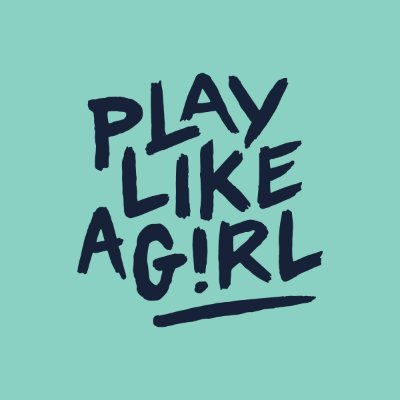
- Founded: 2004
- Founder: Kimberly Clay
- Type: Nonprofit organization
- Headquarters: Nashville, Tennessee, U.S.
- Website: iplaylikeagirl.org

Play Like a Girl is a nonprofit organization that encourages girls to play sports and empowers them to choose careers in science, technology, engineering, and mathematics (STEM). The organization is headquartered in Nashville, Tennessee, and offers services in the United States and Canada. It was founded in 2004 by Kimberly Clay. All of their staff are volunteers.

In November 2020, Sarah Fuller had "Play Like a Girl" printed on the back of her helmet when she kicked off for the Vanderbilt Commodores and became the first woman to play a regular season college football game in a Power Five conference. The following day, Play Like a Girl reported that they had received $13,000 in donations and an increase in people inquiring about volunteering since her game.
