= Sarah Fuller (athlete) =

American football placekicker and soccer goalkeeper

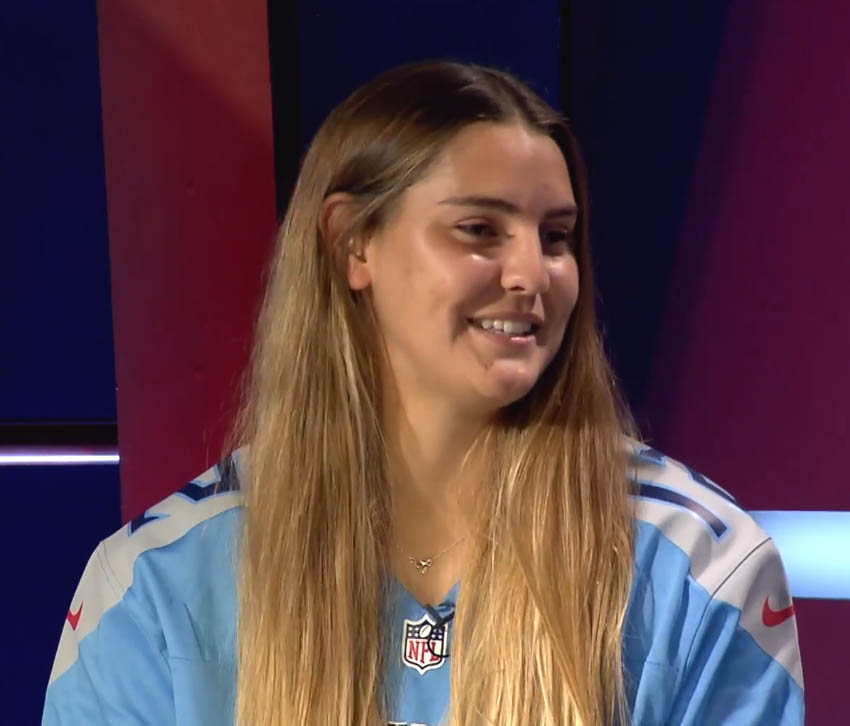
- Fuller during an interview in 2020

Personal information
- Full name: Sarah Jessica Fuller
- Date of birth: June 20, 1999 (age 27)
- Place of birth: Wylie, Texas, U.S.
- Height: 6 ft 2 in (1.88 m)
- Position: Goalkeeper

Youth career
- D'Feeters

College career
Years	Team	Apps	(Gls)
2017–2020	Vanderbilt Commodores	14	(0)
2021	North Texas Mean Green	17	(0)

Senior career*
Years	Team	Apps	(Gls)
2022	Minnesota Aurora FC	13	(0)
Football career
No. 32 – Vanderbilt Commodores
Position	Kicker
Career information
College	Vanderbilt (2020)
Stats at ESPN
- * Club domestic league appearances and goals as of January 3, 2023

Sarah Jessica Fuller (born June 20, 1999) is an American former soccer player. She began her college soccer career with the Vanderbilt Commodores, where she also played college football as a placekicker.

Fuller became a starter with Vanderbilt's soccer team as a senior in 2020, when she helped lead the Commodores to a conference tournament championship in the Southeastern Conference (SEC). Six days later, she became the first woman to play in a football game for a Power Five conference team when she kicked off for the Commodores against Missouri on November 28, 2020. Two weeks later against Tennessee, Fuller kicked an extra point to become the first woman to score in a Power Five football game. The following season, she moved to the North Texas Mean Green as a graduate transfer.

== Early life ==
Fuller was born to 6-foot-2-inch (1.88 m) Brandon and 5-foot-10-inch (1.78 m) Windi Fuller. Both of Fuller's grandfathers are 6 feet 5 inches (1.96 m) tall. She began playing soccer when she was five years old. From elementary through junior high school, Fuller was the tallest student—boy or girl—in her class. Growing up in Wylie, Texas, she attended Wylie High School, where she was a starter for two years at goalie and named the 2017 District 6-6A Goalkeeper of the Year. Fuller was able to kick the ball over 60 yards (55 m) in games. Her leg strength impressed the school's football coaches, who would tell her soccer coach that they could use her on their team.

== College soccer career ==
=== Vanderbilt ===
Fuller entered Vanderbilt University on a soccer scholarship in 2017. She broke her foot the summer before her freshman year, causing her to sit out her first season. Back injuries sidelined her as a sophomore, and she played behind two senior goalkeepers the following season. Fuller played in just two games in her first three years. In the spring of 2020, the COVID-19 pandemic struck and five exhibition games were cancelled, depriving her the opportunity to showcase herself to her coaches. Over the summer, she suffered a stress fracture on her other foot.

As a senior in 2020, Fuller began the season on the bench. The Commodores began the season 1–2 before she made her first career start against South Carolina in October, recording six saves. She remained the starter, finishing with a 7–2–0 record, 28 total saves, and a 75.5 save percentage. Her 0.97 goals against average led the SEC and was the eighth-best in Vanderbilt history in a single season. In the quarterfinals of the SEC Tournament, Fuller recorded a rare goalkeeper assist after booting a free kick that almost travelled the length of the field, leading to a goal in a 4–2 win against Tennessee. On November 22, 2020, she had three saves in the championship game against Arkansas, helping the No. 7 seed Commodores win 3–1 and claim their first SEC Tournament title since 1994. She graduated in May 2021 with a degree in Medicine, Health, and Society.

=== North Texas ===
On November 13, 2020, North Texas women's soccer announced that Fuller signed to join the team in 2021 while she studied for her master's in hospital administration, a degree that was not available at Vanderbilt.

== Club soccer career ==
On February 7, 2022, Fuller was announced as the first-ever signing by Minnesota Aurora FC ahead of the inaugural USL W League season. In 13 appearances, she conceded 8 goals and led the Aurora to the USL W League 2022 championship match, losing to Tormenta FC 2–1 after extra time. She retired from soccer after the season.

== College football career ==
Due to COVID-19, Vanderbilt's football team had limited options at placekicker for its upcoming game against the Missouri Tigers on November 28, 2020. Their starting kicker had already opted out of the season due to coronavirus concerns, and contact tracing had sidelined its other kickers. The Commodores' punter was also an option to kick, but he also served as the team's holder, requiring a new holder if he were to kick. With no men's soccer team at Vanderbilt, Commodores football coach Derek Mason turned to the women's team and Fuller. Contacted the day after her soccer team's SEC title game, she agreed to try out for the 0–7 football team instead of returning home to Wylie for Thanksgiving. Mason opted to use her as the kicker for the road game in Columbia, Missouri, and she was the only kicker to travel with the team.

Vanderbilt trailed Missouri 21–0 at the half. Unhappy with the team's lack of enthusiasm on the sidelines, Fuller gave a halftime speech, encouraging her teammates to cheer each other on and support one another. Coaches told her afterwards that they had been wanting to say something similar for a while. She opened the second half with a kickoff, a squib kick by design that travelled 30 yards. Fuller became the first woman to play football in a Power Five conference, considered the elite conferences in college football, as well as the third female to play in the Football Bowl Subdivision (FBS). (Note: Liz Heaston was the first woman to play college football in 1997, when she kicked for Willamette in an NAIA game. Ashley Martin was the first woman in NCAA Division I with Jacksonville State in 2001, playing in what is now known as the Football Championship Subdivision. In 2003, Katie Hnida with New Mexico became the first woman to score in a Group of Five conference, part of the FBS in addition to the Power Five. April Goss of Kent State became the second woman in the FBS in 2015.) The Commodores lost the game 41–0. With their offense rarely driving past midfield and never reaching inside the Missouri 30-yard-line, she did not get a chance to kick a scoring field goal or an extra point. Fuller trended in the top two on Twitter for much of the day's games, and her kick was the top video clip of the week on ESPN's digital platform. Her kickoff produced the SEC Network's most viewed tweet and most-liked Instagram post in the network's history. She was named the SEC Co-Special Teams Player of the Week.

The following week, Fuller remained with the team, but Mason was fired after a 27–55 overall record as Vanderbilt's coach. She was expected to be in uniform in the following game against Georgia, but the game was postponed due to the SEC's COVID-19 protocols when the Commodores' roster did not meet the minimum requirements. On December 12, Fuller was one of three kickers on the Commodore's active roster against Tennessee. Interim head coach Todd Fitch decided that she would handle kicks inside the 10-yard line, while Pierson Cooke—who was pulled from extra points by Mason after struggling on short kicks earlier in the season—would handle the longer-range opportunities. Fuller kicked an extra point following a first-quarter touchdown to become the first woman to score in a Power Five football game; she finished the game 2-for-2 on extra points. Vanderbilt lost 42–17 to finish the season 0–9.

== Honors ==
- SEC Women's Soccer Tournament championship (2020)
- In December 2020, Fuller's jersey was added to the College Football Hall of Fame
- SEC Co-Special Teams Player of the Week

== Personal life ==
Fuller has worked as an intern for the Nashville Adult Literacy Council and the End Slavery Tennessee campaign. She had also intended to apply for an internship at Play Like a Girl, but did not. In a nod to the organization, she had "Play Like a Girl" printed on the back of her helmet in her first football game with Vanderbilt. The following day, the non-profit reported receiving $13,000 in donations and an increase in people inquiring about volunteering since her game.

In 2021, Fuller was invited to participate in Joe Biden's inauguration. She was featured on the inauguration television special, Celebrating America, during which she introduced Vice President Kamala Harris, the first woman to hold the office.

== See also ==
- List of female American football players
