= Strictly FX =

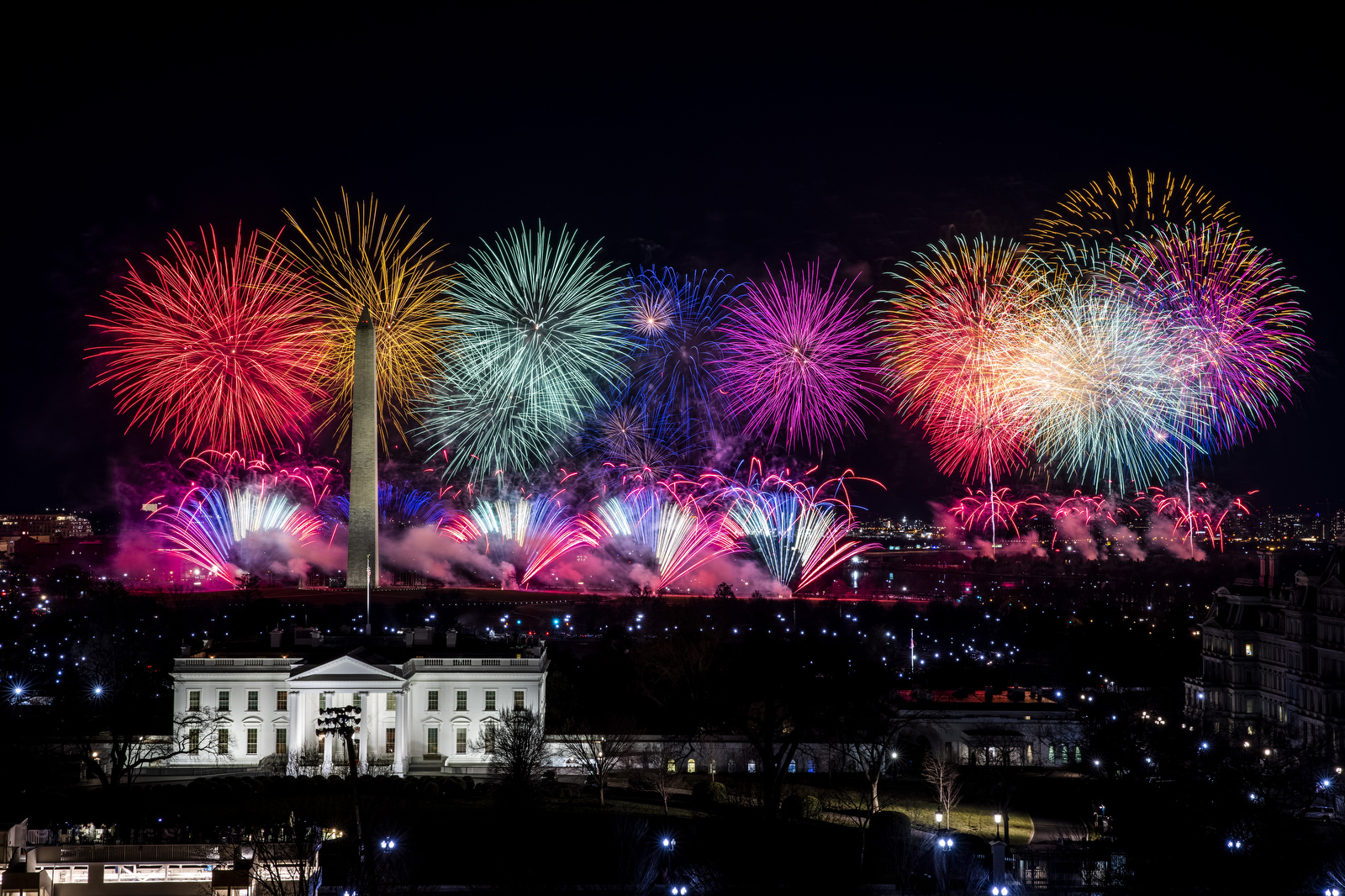
- Fireworks by Strictly FX for the Celebrating America television special in 2021
- Company type: Private company
- Industry: Pyrotechnics
- Founded: April 1, 1996; 30 years ago
- Founders: Ted Maccabee; Mark Grega
- Headquarters: Nashville, United States
- Areas served: United States; United Kingdom
- Products: Shows using lasers, pyrotechnics, flames, cryogenics, confetti, streamers and drones
- Website: strictlyfx.com

Strictly FX is an American live special effects company. The company won the Parnelli Award for Pyro Company of the Year 13 times. The company has offices in Nashville, Los Angeles, Las Vegas, Philadelphia and High Wycombe in the United Kingdom.

Strictly FX provides their services to over 500 shows every year, including working with Madonna, Roger Waters, Luke Bryan, WWE and the Super Bowl.

== History ==
On April 1st 1996, Strictly FX was founded by industry veterans Ted Maccabee and Mark Grega. Strictly FX is a live special effects company that focuses on concert tours, sporting and corporate events. The company's work consist of aiding in the performance of the show, including; lasers, pyrotechnics, flames, cryogenics, confetti, streamers, drones, as well as design.

Strictly FX has won multiple awards, including; the Parnelli Pyro Company of the Year in 2007, 2009, 2010, 2011, 2012, 2014, 2015, 2016, 2017, 2018, 2020, 2023, and 2025. They've also been awarded the Tour Link Top Dog Award for best Pyro/special effects company in 2012 and 2014.

The firm was in charge of the fireworks for the Celebrating America television special, which was part of the festivities for the Inauguration of Joe Biden.

In 2021, Strictly FX acquired the UK based company Quantum Special Effects and opened their first overseas branch, Strictly FX UK Ltd.
