= Pamela Love =

American jewelry designer

- Born: New York
- Occupation: Jewelry designer

Pamela Love is an American jewelry designer based in New York City. Her eponymous jewelry brand was launched in 2007.

== Life and career ==
Pamela Love was born in New York and grew up in South Florida. After receiving her Bachelor of Fine Arts in Experimental Film and Art Direction from New York University’s Tisch School of the Arts, Love worked as a stylist and art director for film, fashion, and music video shoots before designing jewelry as a full-time profession. She worked as a painting assistant under Italian American artist Francesco Clemente from 2005 to 2010, and began creating her own jewelry in 2007. In May 2012 she married illustrator and musician Matthew Jameson Nelson Love.

=== Jewelry brand ===
In 2007 Love began making jewelry in her apartment in Brooklyn. Pamela Love launched her eponymous jewelry line in 2008 from her Brooklyn home. In 2009, she moved to a studio in Manhattan's Garment District and began production on a larger scale. All of her jewelry production is done in-house, and she uses sustainable methods whenever possible. Her work is inspired by astronomy, astrology, alchemy, botany, the American South West and New York City architecture, folklore. She incorporates traditional tribal artisan patterns from New Africa, medieval European iconography and Mexican folk art.

In May 2019, Love sold an 80% stake in the brand to RedLuxury Group. In July 2024, Love bought back the brand in partnership with former RedLuxury Group chief operating officer Alex Henriques and his wife, Stephany Sleiman.

== Bibliography ==
In 2016 Love published her book Pamela Love: Muses and Manifestations.

== Awards and collaborations ==
2010:

- Finalist in the CFDA/Vogue Fashion Fund

2011:

- Nominee for the CFDA Swarovski Award for Accessory Design
- Runner up for the CFDA/ Vogue Fashion Fund
- Won the Ecco Domani Fashion Fund Award

2012:

- Nominee for the CFDA Swarovski Award for Accessory Design
- Won the CFDA Lexus Eco Challenge for Sustainable Design

2013:

- Won the CFDA Swarovski Award for Accessory Design
