= Natacha Marro =

French shoe designer

Natacha Marro is a maker of shoes and boots.

Natacha grew up in Nice, France before moving to London, England to study at Cordwainers College. After serving a traditional apprenticeship, she opened her first shop in South London in 2000 before entering into a successful partnership in House of Harlot with fellow designer Robin Archer.

Her client list includes David Bowie, Star Wars, Luella, Gwen Stefani, Olivia Newton-John, Goldfrapp and Grayson Perry. Her work has been profiled in newspapers such as The Independent and The Observer.
