= Ricky Kirshner =

American television producer

Ricky Kirshner is an American television producer.

Kirshner has won nine Emmy Awards out of 26 nominations.

== Early life ==
Kirshner is the son of Don Kirshner.

== Career ==
Kirshner partnered with Glenn Weiss to create White Cherry Entertainment.

Kirshner has been involved in the Tony Awards since 1993, first acting as a line producer. Since 2004, Kirshner has acted as an executive producer of the Tony Awards.

From 2007 through 2020, Kirshner acted as executive producer of the Super Bowl halftime show.

From 2015 through 2021, Kirshner, along with Glenn Weiss, was an executive producer of the Kennedy Center Honors.

Kirshner has been involved with all Democratic National Conventions since 1992. Among the roles he has played in the production of conventions, Kirshner acted as the producer of the 2000 convention, the executive producer for the 2008 and 2012 conventions, a co-producer for the 2016 convention (alongside Vicangelo Bulluck), and oversaw the programming of the 2020 Democratic National Convention.

Kirshner and Glenn Weiss co-produced the Neighborhood Inaugural Ball as part of the first inauguration of Barack Obama. Kirshner and Wiess also produced the "Celebrating America" television special as part of the inauguration of Joe Biden.
