= Nick Knight (photographer) =

British photographer (born 1958)

Nick Knight CBE
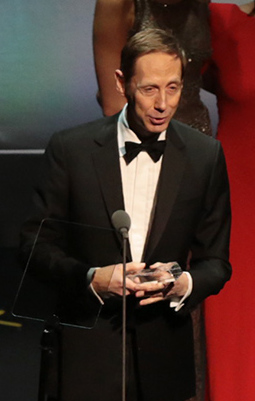
- Knight in 2015
- Born: Nicholas David Gordon Knight; 24 November 1958 (age 67); London, England
- Education: Bournemouth and Poole College of Art and Design
- Known for: Fashion photography, film
- Website: www.showstudio.com www.nickknight.com

Nicholas David Gordon Knight CBE (born 24 November 1958) is a British fashion photographer and founder and director of SHOWstudio.com. He is an honorary professor at University of the Arts London and was awarded an honorary Ph.D. by the same university. He has produced books of his work including retrospectives Nicknight (1994) and Nick Knight (2009). In 2016, Knight's 1992 campaign photograph for fashion brand Jil Sander was sold by Phillips auction house at the record-breaking price of HKD 2,360,000.

== Life and career ==
Knight was born in Hammersmith, London. He studied photography at Bournemouth and Poole College of Art and Design and published his first book of photographs, Skinhead, in 1982 when he was still a student at the school. He was then commissioned by i-D editor Terry Jones to create a series of portraits for the magazine's fifth-anniversary issue. His work caught the attention of art director Marc Ascoli, who commissioned Knight to shoot the 1986 catalog of Japanese designer Yohji Yamamoto in collaboration with Peter Saville.

In 1992 Knight took a year-long break from fashion photography to work on an exhibition at the Natural History Museum, London, with British architect David Chipperfield. The exhibition was called Plant Power and was on the theme of the relationship between humans and plants. The exhibition lasted for fifteen years.

In November 2000, Knight launched SHOWstudio.com.

He directed his first music video in 2001, for the song "Pagan Poetry" by Björk. In 2003, he created a film for Massive Attack's album 100th Window. In 2011 and 2013, he directed the videos for Lady Gaga's single "Born This Way" and Kanye West's "Bound 2" and "Black Skinhead". In 2016, he photographed American rapper/singer Travis Scott for his sophomore album Birds in the Trap Sing McKnight.

In 2016, he was commissioned to shoot official portraits of Queen Elizabeth and Prince Charles for the queen's 90th birthday.

Also in 2016, Knight's hand-coated pigment photographic work, Tatjana Patitz for Jil Sander, 1992, sold for an artist-record $304,204 at Phillips Hong Kong. The work, originally photographed in 1992 and reprinted in 2016, featured supermodel Tatjana Patitz in a Jil Sander advertising campaign photographed by Knight. The celebrated photograph from Knight's commercial career in the fashion industry represents the collectability of his painterly works to buyers in the world of fine art.

In 2019, he collaborated with Kanye West, directing his short film Jesus Is King. Filmed in the summer of 2019, the film brings West's Sunday Service to life in the Roden Crater, artist James Turrell's installation in the Painted Desert. The film accompanied the release of Jesus Is King, West's ninth studio album, and was released in IMAX theaters on 25 October 2019.

In 2021, he reunited with Gaga for a collaboration with champagne brand Dom Perignon on the campaign "The Queendom", in order to realize a series of photos as well as an advertisement, which was released on 6 April.

Following the announcement of Lady Gaga's 2022 Summer Stadium World Tour, The Chromatica Ball, Knight was commissioned to shoot a series of interludes several weeks before it started, matching the twisted dark fantasy visuals Gaga had in mind for her shows.

Already Officer of the Order of the British Empire (OBE), Knight was appointed Commander of the Order of the British Empire (CBE) in the 2023 Birthday Honours for services to fashion and photography.

== Selected exhibitions ==
A few of Nick Knight's exhibitions are listed below:

2016

- Nick Knight, Christophe Guye Galerie, Zürich, Switzerland
- Nick Knight: Image, Daelim Museum, Seoul, South Korea
- History of Photography: The Body, Victoria and Albert Museum, London
- #techstyle, Museum of Fine Arts, Boston, United States of America
- Vogue 100, National Portrait Gallery, London

2015

- Vogue Like a Painting, Museo Thyssen-Bornemisza, Madrid, Spain
- Killer Heels, Victoria and Albert Museum, London
- Alexander McQueen: Savage Beauty, Victoria and Albert Museum, London

2014

- Killer Heels, Brooklyn Museum, Brooklyn New York, United States

2012

- Icons of Tomorrow – Contemporary Fashion Photography, Christophe Guye Galerie, Zurich, Switzerland

2011

- Vanity, Kunsthalle Vienna, Austria

2009

- Fashion Revolution, Somerset House, London

2006

- Archeology of Elegance, Deichtorhallen Museum, Hamburg, Germany
- Talking to Myself, Yohji Yamamoto, La Masion Européenne de la Photographie, Paris

2001

- Century City, Tate Modern, London

2000

- CUT, (Exhibition By The Hairdresser Barnabee) Musee De La Mode, Paris
- La Beaute, Exhibition For EN2000, Avignon, France
- Facing The Future, Touring Exhibition to Celebrate 20 Years of The Face Magazine
- Das Fernglas, German Hygiene Museum, Dresden, Germany
- Nadja, Exhibition Celebrating Nadja Auermann, Germany
- Imperfect Beauty, Victoria and Albert Museum, London
- Nurture and Desire, Hayward Gallery, London

1998

- Look at me – Fashion Photography 1965 to Present, British Council Traveling Exhibition
- Powerhause:uk, Department of Trade and Industry
- The Oriental Curiosity – 21st Century Chinoiserie, Traveling exhibition, (London, Paris, Hong Kong)
- Shoreditch Biennale, London
- The first 25 (retrospective exhibition of images from Visionaire magazine), Colette, Paris
- Addressing the Century: 100 Years of Art and Fashion, Hayward Gallery, London
- No Sex Please we’re British, Dazed & Confused, and Shiseido Co Ltd, Japan
- Yves Saint Laurent – 40 Years of Creation, New York, and Tokyo
- Silver & Syrup, Victoria and Albert Museum, London

1997

- Contemporary Fashion Photography, Victoria and Albert Museum, London
- JAM, Barbican Gallery, London
- Little Boxes, (to accompany the launch of Michael Mack's book, „Surface - Contemporary. Photographic Practice“); Traveling exhibition curated by Michael Mack

1996

- Art/Fashion (with Alexander McQueen), Biennale di Firenze, Italy

1994

- A Positive View, Saatchi Gallery, London

1993

- Vanities Exhibition, Paris
- Plant Power, (permanent exhibit), Natural History Museum, London

1992

- Festival De La Photo De Mode Exhibition, Monaco

1991

- Festival De La Photo De Mode Exhibition, Barcelona, Spain

1989

- Out of Fashion, The Photographers' Gallery, London
- Ils Annoncent La Colour, Rencontres d'Arles, Holly

1986

- 20 For Today, National Portrait Gallery, London
- 14-21 Youth Culture Exhibition, Victoria and Albert Museum, London

1982

- Group Exhibition 1982, The Photographers' Gallery, London

== Publications ==
- Skinhead. London; New York: Omnibus, 1982. ISBN 9780711900523.
- Nicknight. Munich: Schirmer/Mosel, 1994. ISBN 9783888146619. Produced and directed by Marc Ascoli, Nick Knight, and Peter Saville. Written by Satoko Nakahara.
- Flora. Text by Sandra Knapp, art direction by Peter Saville, design by Paul Barnes. Initiated in 1993 for his installation of Plant Power at the Natural History Museum, London.
  - Munich: Schirmer/Mosel, 1997. ISBN 9780948835193. Hardback.
  - 'Harry N. Abrams, Inc., 2003. ISBN 9780810929883. Paperback.
- Nick Knight. With an introduction by Charlotte Cotton.
  - New York: Collins Design, 2009. ISBN 9780061714573.
  - Harper Design, 2015. ISBN 9780061714573.
- Isabella Blow: Fashion Galore!. New York: Rizzoli, 2013. ISBN 9780847841721.

== Awards ==
- 2015 - Isabella Blow Award for Fashion Creator at British Fashion Awards.

== See also ==
- Big 4 (sculpture)
