= On God (disambiguation) =

"On God" is a 2019 song by Kanye West.

On God may also refer to:

- "On God", a 2022 song by Fivio Foreign from the album B.I.B.L.E.
- "On God", a 2018 song by Gucci Mane from the album Evil Genius
- "On God", a 2019 song by Juice Wrld from the album Death Race for Love
- "On God", a 2019 song by Mustard from the album Perfect Ten
