= Jesus Is King =

- Digital and CD artwork (the vinyl cover is a transparent sleeve); LP copies are packaged as depicted in the artwork

Studio album by Kanye West
- Released: October 25, 2019
- Recorded: 2017 – October 2019
- Genres: Christian hip-hop; gospel
- Length: 27:04
- Labels: GOOD; Def Jam
- Producers: Kanye West; Pi'erre Bourne; AllDay; Angel Lopez; BoogzDaBeast; Budgie; DrtWrk; E*vax; Federico Vindver; FnZ; Labrinth; Michael Cerda; Ronny J; Timbaland; Warryn Campbell; Xcelence

Kanye West chronology
Kids See Ghosts (2018)	Jesus Is King (2019)	Donda (2021)

Singles from Jesus Is King
- 1. "Follow God" Released: November 8, 2019; 2. "Closed on Sunday" Released: November 28, 2019

Jesus Is King is the ninth studio album by the American rapper Kanye West. It was released by GOOD Music and Def Jam Recordings on October 25, 2019. It follows a Christian theme, in stark contrast from previous works by West, who described it as "an expression of the gospel." It features guest appearances from Clipse, Ty Dolla Sign, Kenny G, Fred Hammond, Ant Clemons, and the Sunday Service Choir. Production was handled by West himself, as well as Federico Vindver, Ronny J, Pi'erre Bourne, Labrinth and Timbaland, among others.

West began recording the album in August 2018, originally announcing it as Yandhi. The album missed two initial release dates in September and November 2018 under the original title, before being delayed indefinitely due to leaks. West had formed his gospel group the Sunday Service Choir in January 2019, performing gospel songs and covers of songs from West's discography. The song "Water" was performed live prior to release by the group. In August 2019, Yandhi was reannounced as Jesus Is King, but it missed two planned release dates for late September 2019 under the new title.

The final release of Jesus Is King was simultaneous with that of a concert film of the same name, which included a number of the tracks as part of the soundtrack. The singles "Follow God" and "Closed on Sunday" were both released in November 2019, charting in the top 20 of the US Billboard Hot 100. The album received mixed reviews from music critics, with a number of them drawing comparisons between it and West's previous solo album, Ye (2018). Some critics complimented the former's composition, while others expressed negative feelings towards the lyrics and the inconsistency of ideas.

Jesus Is King won the Top Christian Album and Top Gospel Album awards at the 2020 Billboard Music Awards and Best Contemporary Christian Music Album at the 63rd Annual Grammy Awards in 2021. It stood as West's record-tying ninth consecutive studio album to debut atop the US Billboard 200. In addition, West broke several Billboard charts' records. The album was a chart topper in nine other countries, including Australia and Canada, while attaining top five positions in the Czech Republic, Finland, Ireland, the Netherlands, Sweden, and the United Kingdom. It has been certified gold and silver in the United States and the United Kingdom by the Recording Industry Association of America (RIAA) and British Phonographic Industry (BPI), respectively. A companion album, Jesus Is Born, was released in December 2019 by the Sunday Service Choir.

== Background and recording ==
=== August–November 2018: Yandhi, Chicago and Uganda ===
Throughout May and June 2018, five seven-track albums produced by West at his ranch in Jackson Hole, Wyoming were successively released as the Wyoming Sessions. American rapper Pusha T's third studio album Daytona was released first, followed by West's eighth studio album Ye, West's collaborative studio album Kids See Ghosts, with Kid Cudi as Kids See Ghosts, Nas' eleventh studio album Nasir, and Teyana Taylor's second studio album K.T.S.E.; all of the albums were released in 2018. In July 2018, Chicago music artist Chance the Rapper announced that West was coming to Chicago to produce for his seven-track debut studio album. (Note: Chance the Rapper's debut studio album The Big Day was later released in July 2019 with no contributions from West.) West was seen in the city at the end of August 2018, and simultaneously confirmed to Fox News that the two of them were recording music together. West later stated that his recording sessions with Chance the Rapper had helped the former reconnect with his roots and faith in Jesus. The following month, West released the collaborative single "I Love It" with fellow American rapper Lil Pump. (Note: "I Love It" was later included on Lil Pump's second studio album Harverd Dropout, released in February 2019.) Later that month, West visited Colombia to record music with fellow rapper 6ix9ine. West also reactivated his Instagram account after a half-year absence, with indications that he was working with American record producer Ronny J, and Chance the Rapper, alongside the latter's brother Taylor Bennett, and American rapper G Herbo. Through his Instagram, West confirmed that he was collaborating with 6ix9ine and began posting snippets of new music. American singer-songwriter Ant Clemons, who had previously worked with West on Ye and K.T.S.E., was invited to Chicago where he entered a studio room with West, Chance the Rapper, and American conservative commentator Candace Owens. During these Chicago sessions, Clemons recorded his vocals for "Everything We Need” and an earlier version of the track "Selah" (originally titled "Chakras"). West also announced that he was permanently moving back to Chicago, which his wife Kim Kardashian was not aware of until she heard about West's announcement through social media, and that he was actively working on a collaborative studio album with Chance the Rapper titled Good Ass Job. West ultimately did not move back to Chicago and Good Ass Job has yet to materialize.

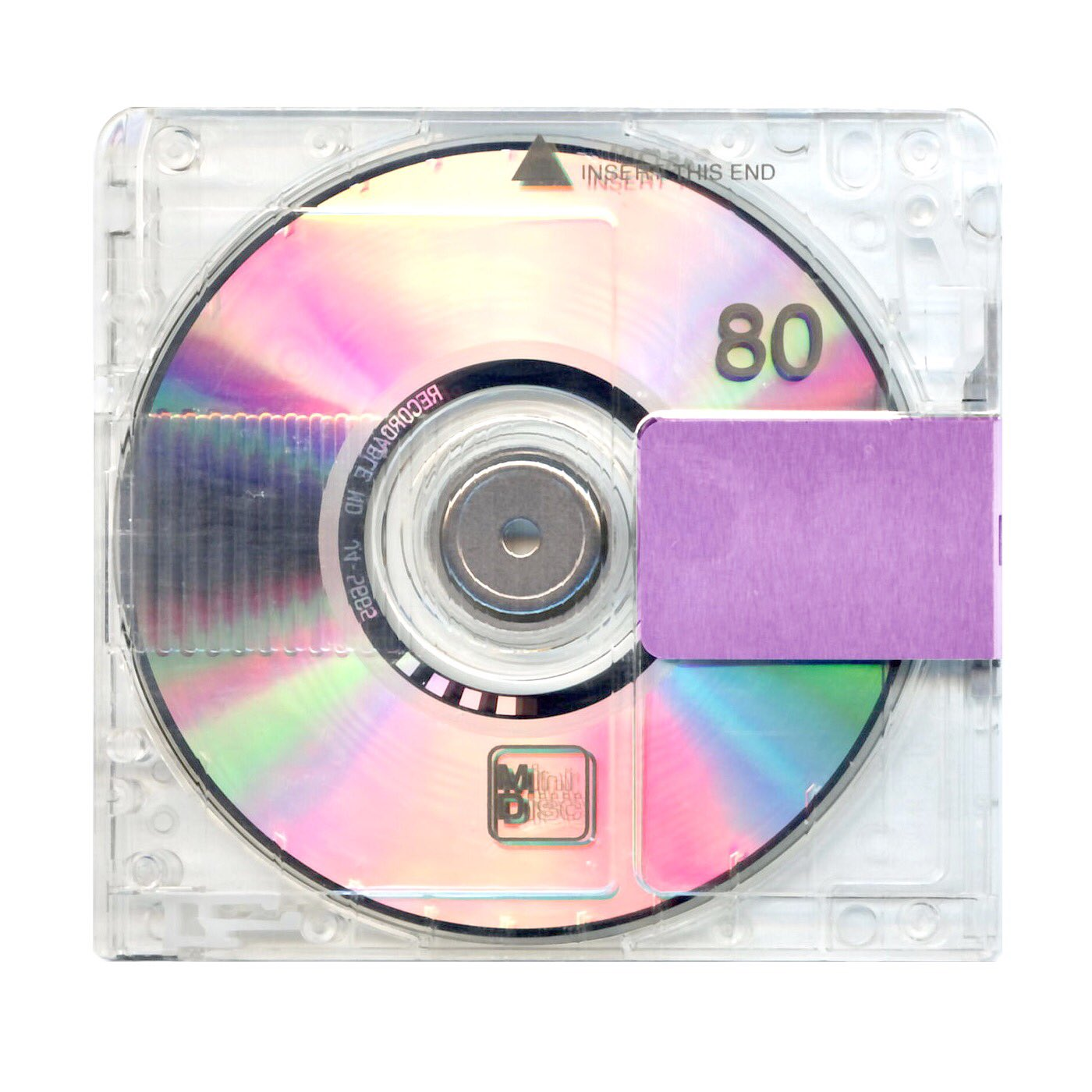
The cover art for Yandhi (left) featured a MiniDisc with a purple shutter. The cover art was compared to that of West's sixth studio album Yeezus (2013; right), with speculation that Yandhi would've been a follow-up album.

On September 17, 2018, West announced his ninth studio album Yandhi, just three months after the release of his previous solo album Ye, revealing the cover art and initial release date of September 29, 2018. On September 27, 2018, West visited The Fader headquarters to preview new music from Yandhi and invited people to change up the lyrics. Songs previewed included vocals from American singer Ty Dolla Sign and American rappers 6ix9ine, and XXXTentacion; West was awaiting Barbadian singer Rihanna to send in vocals for a track. A working track list for the initial version of Yandhi included "I Love It" with Lil Pump, "We Got Love" with Teyana Taylor and American singer Lauryn Hill (originally intended for K.T.S.E.), (Note: Teyana Taylor later released "We Got Love" as a single in December 2019, with it including production from West.) and "New Body", which Trinidad and Tobago-born rapper Nicki Minaj recorded her verse in under an hour after Kardashian coordinated to get her featured on the song. Other tracks included "The Storm", "Bye Bye Baby", "Hurricane", "Alien / SpaceX", "Last Name", "Sky City", "Garden" and "Chakras."

West was the musical guest for the season 44 premiere of Saturday Night Live (SNL), slated to coincide with the release of Yandhi on September 29, 2018. Universal Music Publishing Group accidentally leaked that the initial version of the album was to be eight tracks long that same month, with Clemons being shown to have contributed to seven of the tracks. After the album went unreleased, a rescheduled date of November 23, 2018, was announced by Kardashian on October 1 of that year. That same day, West visited the TMZ offices for an interview, admitting that the album was not actually finished yet and that he would be going to Africa in two weeks to continue recording for Yandhi. West talked about recording in Chicago and how he "felt the roots" but wanted to go to further his energy by touching African soil and recording in nature. West said the previous five albums he released in 2018 as the Wyoming Sessions were "superhero rehabilitation" and declared that Yandhi was a "full Ye album," with West comparing it to his critically acclaimed albums 808s & Heartbreak (2008), My Beautiful Dark Twisted Fantasy (2010), and Watch the Throne (2011), the latter of which is a collaboration with fellow rapper Jay-Z. West stated that "the alien Ye is like, fully back in mode, off of medication."

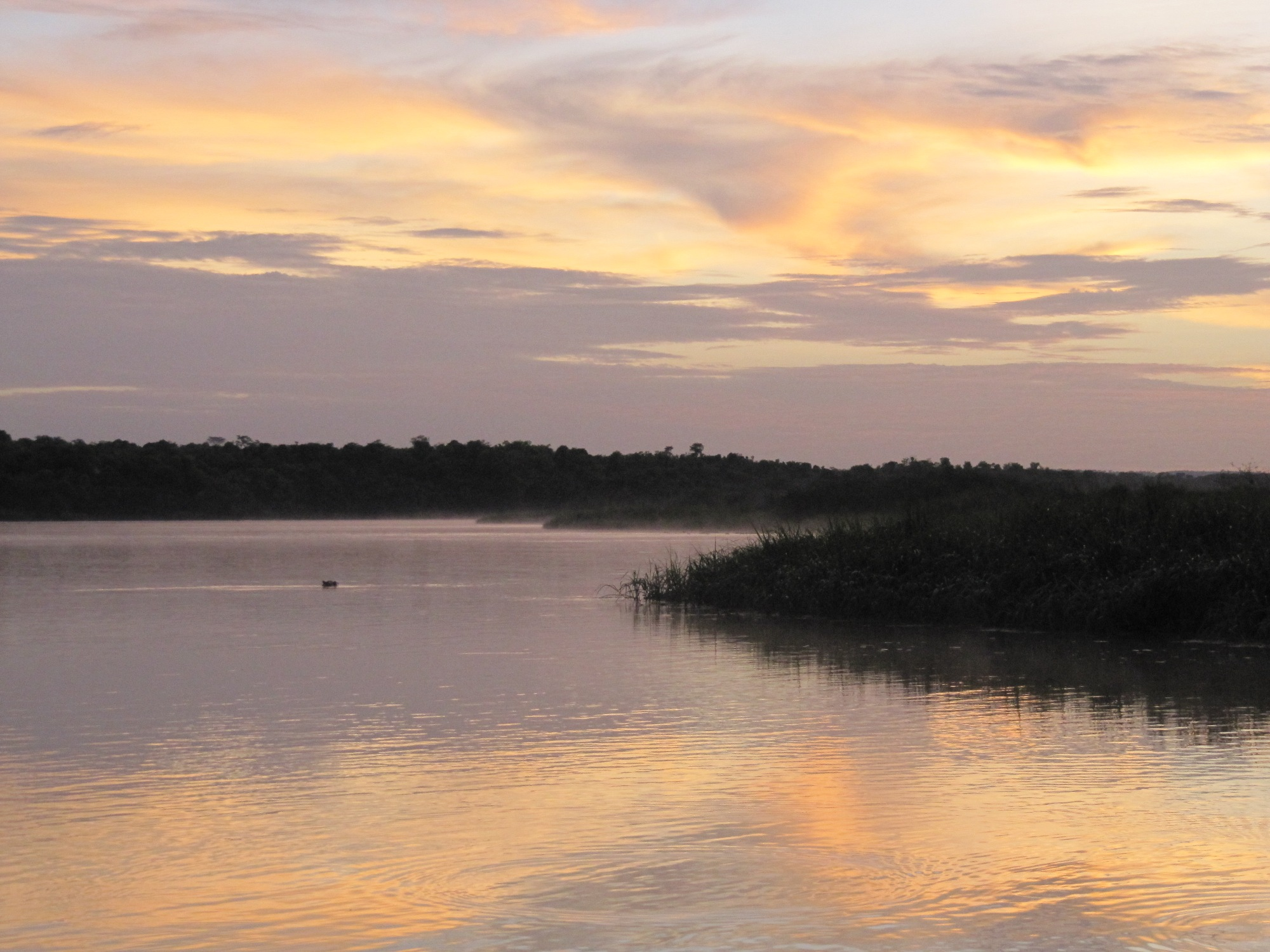
West recorded at the Murchison Falls National Park, Uganda in October 2018.

On October 12, 2018, West arrived in Uganda and restarted work on the album in a dome-shaped studio set up in the Chobe Safari Lodge at the Murchison Falls National Park. West arrived with around 50 people and recorded for five days. He played new music, including a studio recording of the "We Got Love" remix, for a group of about 100 Ugandan school children during a charity event. In an October 21, 2018, interview, American rapper Quavo stated that his trio Migos had recorded for the album. In November 2018, following a Kids See Ghosts performance with Kid Cudi at American rapper Tyler, the Creator's Camp Flog Gnaw Carnival, West tweeted that he felt Yandhi was not finished, and that he would "announce the release date once it's done," delaying the album indefinitely.

=== December 2018 – April 2019: Miami and the Sunday Service Choir ===
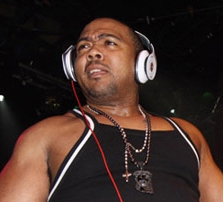
American record producer Timbaland began working on the album in December 2018 and contributed production on five tracks.

In December 2018, West reiterated on Twitter that he was still not taking medications for his bipolar disorder in order to record music on the same level as some of his previous works. Amanda Mull, writing for The Atlantic, described West's erratic tweets as promoting "a dangerous myth" that suffering is required for great art and creativity. That same month, American record producer Timbaland and Argentinian jazz pianist Federico Vindver were recording in Miami when West joined their studio session to make "more healing music" for Yandhi. Clemons was also invited to a record in Miami after he had been talked about to Timbaland by West "nonstop." Vindver stated he recorded about 100 songs with West over the course of ten days. Vindver and American record producer Angel Lopez have stated that these recording sessions lasted 19 to 20 hours. The track "Use This Gospel" was first recorded during these sessions under the name "Law of Attraction."

On January 6, 2019, West debuted the Sunday Service Choir, and continued to rehearse on every Sunday. The choir sings classic gospel music and "church-friendly" remixes of popular songs. That same month, West began splitting time between Los Angeles and his newly purchased house in Miami, being seen in the latter city with Timbaland recording with other artists such as Lil Wayne, 2 Chainz, Migos, Tee Grizzley, and YNW Melly. On February 14, 2019, West met saxophonist Kenny G for the first time after hiring him for a Valentine's Day performance. The day after, West began previewing new songs to him in the studio and Kenny G suggested that his saxophone "would sound really good" on "Use This Gospel." West pulled out a microphone and Kenny G recorded his part, keeping the track for later reverb and EQ tweaks.

On February 25, 2019, a video of West playing a keyboard and leading the Sunday Service Choir for a cover of American gospel singer Fred Hammond's "This Is The Day" was tweeted by American rapper Cyhi the Prynce and went viral. The video garnered Hammond's attention. In March 2019, Hammond was introduced to West at Chance the Rapper's wedding, where West invited Hammond to record for the album. Timbaland shared a snippet of a Yandhi track on Instagram that same month. The track "Water" had been recorded in April 2019, and was debuted live less than a week later on April 21, 2019. "Water" was performed with the Sunday Service Choir, Clemons and Ty Dolla Sign at Coachella for Easter. West has claimed that he was "radically saved" around the time of the Coachella performance and later enlisted Adam Tyson as a personal pastor for weekly Bible studies.

=== May–October 2019: Wyoming, Calabasas and Jesus Is King ===
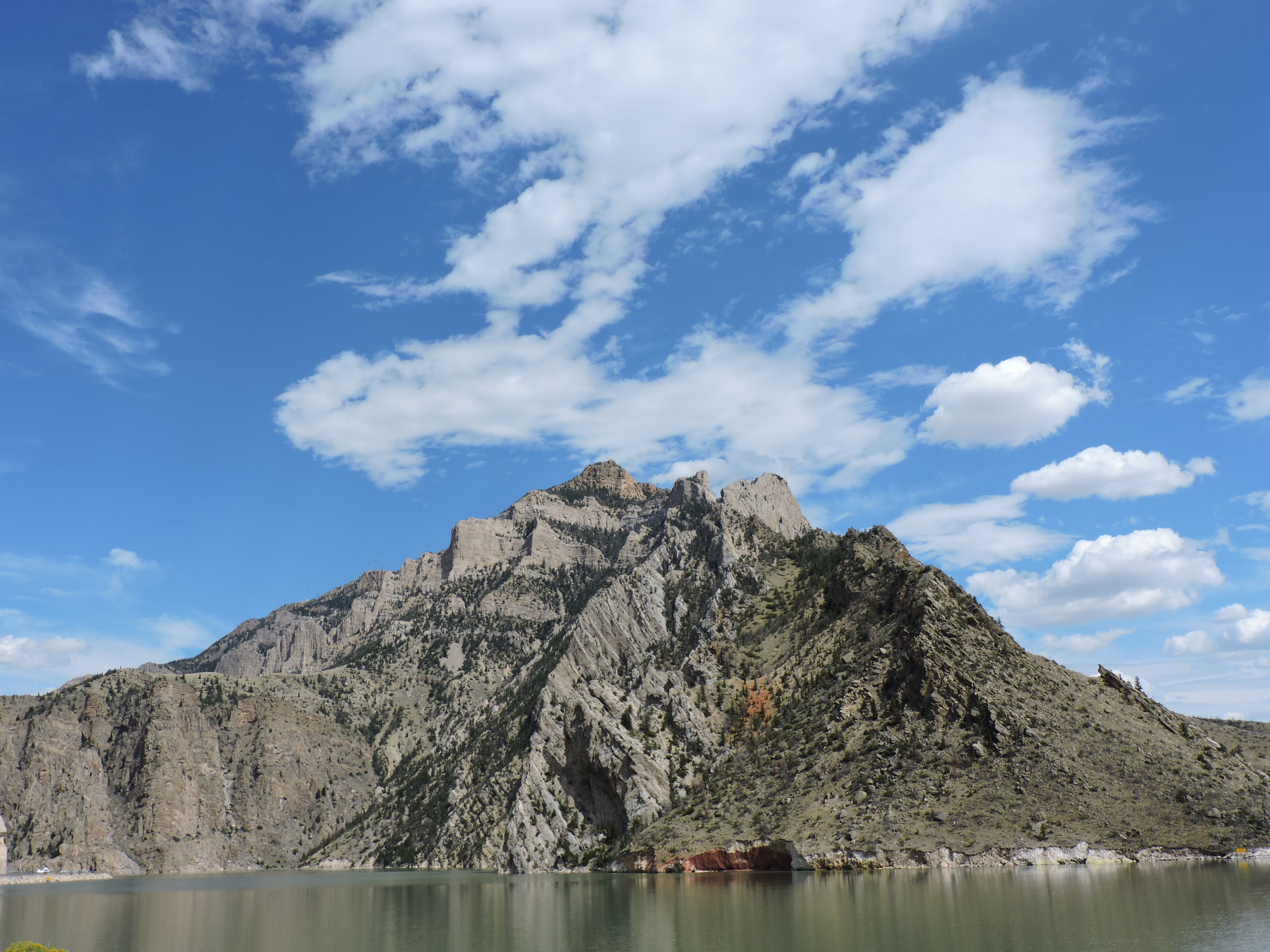
In September 2019, West returned to Wyoming to finish Jesus Is King, the same state where he recorded his previous solo album Ye (2018).

In May 2019, West invited Pusha T and the latter's brother, fellow American rapper No Malice, to Wyoming, the same state where West recorded his previous two albums Ye and Kids See Ghosts. Pusha T and No Malice were reunited as their duo Clipse. A feature from the duo was requested by West, though Pusha T had been unsure about whether or not No Malice would say yes to the two of them collaborating as Clipse. Their feature on "Use This Gospel" marked the first time in five years since No Malice stated that the duo would never perform together again. West no longer wanted to rap on the album until he was persuaded by No Malice. West also spoke to Tyson about quitting rapping because he viewed it as "the devil's music," to which Tyson suggested that West rap for God. Tyson was invited to weigh in on how to include Christian elements within the album.

In the summer, West began contacting Vindver and Lopez directly instead of through Timbaland. The two were invited to Calabasas, California to work on the project again. Lopez would drive an hour to Calabasas daily for 14-hour-long sessions, according to his wife Amira Velazquez. Vindver was also invited to record in Wyoming, noting that West's "faith went past a point of no return." Vindver stated that around 30 producers were working on the album before West cut down to three producers when recording resumed in Wyoming. The other producers were tasked with finding samples, while Vindver was tasked with playing instruments. In July 2019, American record producer Pi'erre Bourne worked on the album with West in Japan. Nicki Minaj also stated during an episode of Queen Radio that West had recently made her aware of him being a born-again Christian. West quit his self-diagnosed pornography addiction and asked collaborators on the album not to engage in premarital sex.

On August 29, 2019, Kardashian announced Jesus Is King by posting a handwritten tracklist of the project on her Twitter. The note also listed a September 27, 2019, release date. In early September 2019, West was reportedly finishing up the album with Pusha T at his newly purchased ranch in Cody, Wyoming. On September 25, 2019, multiple sources indicated that Def Jam executives had met with West in Wyoming and that the album would miss its scheduled released date. Following a listening party in Detroit, Kardashian announced that the album would miss its September 27 release date and would instead be released two days later on September 29, 2019, as mixing had to be finalized. Within the two days, West had re-recorded the track "Selah" and was still awaiting a new Nicki Minaj verse for "New Body." (Note: "New Body" initially leaked online in July 2019. It was revealed in October 2019 by the latter that she was re-recording her verse to be religious, but that her and West were having disagreements. The track was ultimately scrapped from the album.) The September 29 release date was also missed. According to TMZ, the album had already been completed, but West was continually revising it since he was unsatisfied with the end product.

In October 2019, West continued working on the album in Wyoming and invited Swizz Beatz to help finish it. On October 21, 2019, West tweeted out a new release date, October 25, 2019. West cut the songs "New Body", "Up from the Ashes", and "LA Monster" from the album. Jesus Is King went on to miss its midnight premiere, with West explaining the delay hours after by tweeting: "To my fans, Thank you for being loyal & patient. We are specifically fixing mixes on 'Everything We Need' 'Follow God' & 'Water'." West entrusted frequent collaborator Consequence to overlook final mixing and the album was delivered to streaming services at 4:30 AM. Jesus Is King was ultimately released on its planned release date. West claimed in a January 2020 interview with GQ that 20 percent of the album was recorded on an iPhone, including the track "Closed on Sunday."

== Music and production ==
"Selah"
Sample of the album's second track "Selah", which is the first full track on the album and includes West rapping over organ chords. The chorus is a rendition of gospel song "Revelations 19:1", as performed by the Sunday Service Choir.

Jesus Is King is a Christian hip-hop record, and features a significant gospel influence. Complex journalist Eric Skelton considered that it was not a sonic departure from West's previous work, noting its "healthy doses of bass, pretty chords, hip-hop sensibilities, and pop melodies." and claimed that it borrows elements from his past albums such as My Beautiful Dark Twisted Fantasy, Ye, and The Life of Pablo (2016), while Samuel J. Robinson of Rolling Stone highlighted its use of trap drums, ambient flourishes and samples. However, Charles Holmes, also from Rolling Stone, described it as a "far more muted, stripped-down affair than most West albums," with him noting the exception of the track "On God", produced by Pi'erre Bourne, due to its "galactic, fiery, and intense" beat.

Holmes also considered that, despite its gospel influences, "Jesus Is King is a gospel album in the same way a square is a rectangle," only fitting "the most basic criteria," and wrote that its production consists largely of recognizable gospel components such as "pared-back guitars, mournful organs and pianos, and choral arrangements deployed like soul samples." Andrew Legg, Tasmanian musician and director of the ARIA award-nominated Southern Gospel Choir described Jesus is King as "a remarkable gospel album," calling it contemporary in a genuine way and he predicted that the album would "inevitably challenge the traditional concept of African American gospel while influencing it shape for years to come." Writing for The Daily Telegraph, Neil McCormick viewed Jesus Is King as where "West has confounded expectations once again with a set of dramatic, evangelical hip hop testimonials." McCormick commented that choir elements of gospel are included on it, while also citing church organs, synths and vocoder harmonies as being present. Torsten Ingvaldsen from Hypebeast noted the influence taken from West's previous albums, describing Jesus Is King as what "can be seen as Kanye's way of reenvisioning his past, updating it within his own hip-hop missionary lens in an attempt to bring something new to these seemingly anachronistic principles."

== Themes and lyrics ==
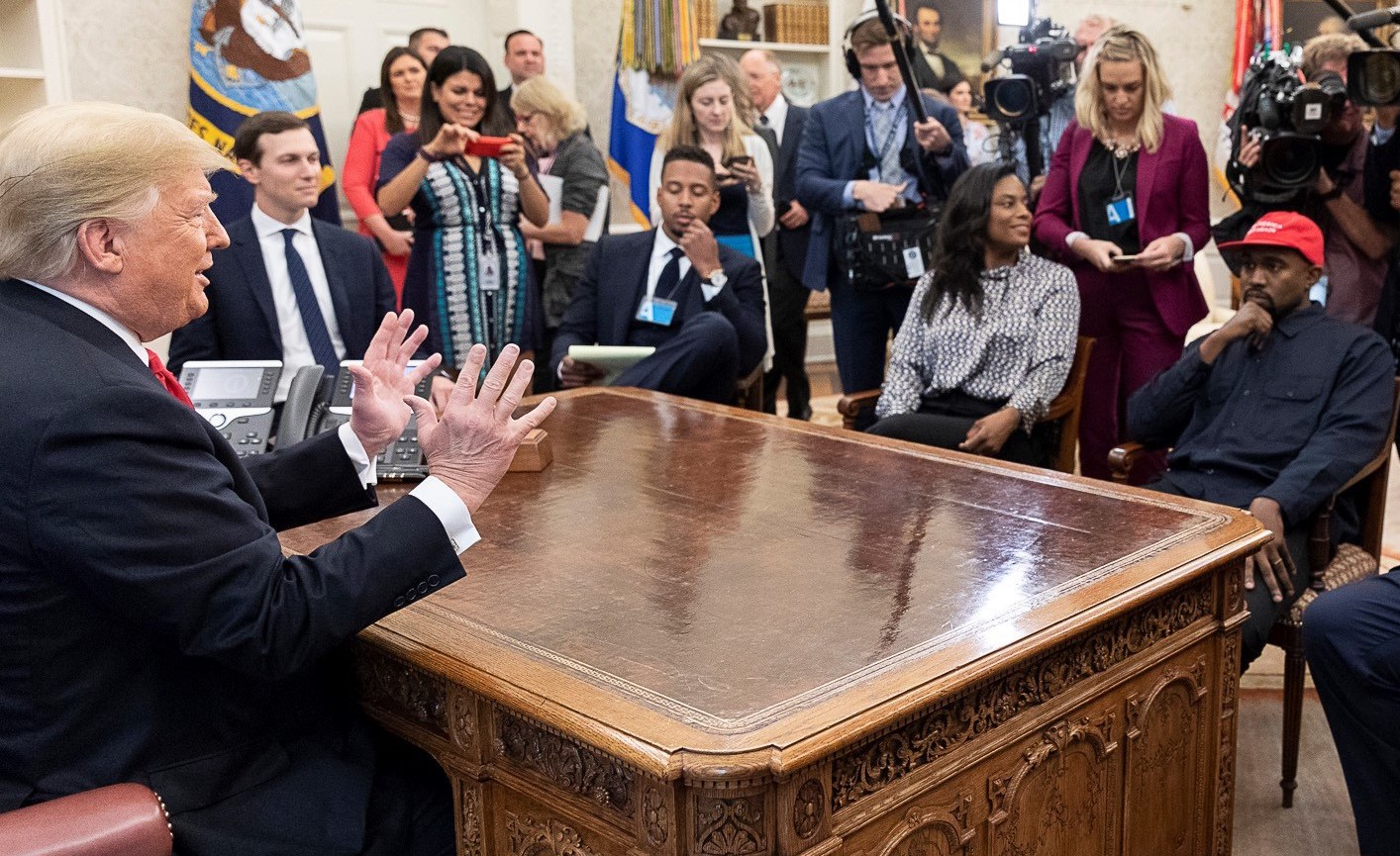
West references the Thirteenth Amendment on "On God" and "Hands On". In October 2018, West met with then-US president Donald Trump and discussed altering the amendment.

Jesus Is King focuses on the Christian concept of salvation. Keeping with its Christian theme, the album's lyrics do not contain any profanity or sexual references, including those performed by guest vocalists. West spoke at the listening party in New York on September 29, 2019, stating: "This album has been made to be an expression of the gospel and to share the gospel and the truth of what Jesus has done to me. When I think of the goodness of Jesus and all that he does for me, my soul cries out." Tyson was present in the studio for the recording of Jesus Is King and helped tweak certain lyrics "to articulate the gospel more clearly" despite claiming that the work is all West's and Tyson did not view himself as writing any of the songs. This was claimed by Tyson to be part of the creative process of him and West. West "asked people working on the album to fast or to avoid premarital sex." Tyson had discussed both justification and sanctification with West in their conversation.

"Follow God"
Sample of the lead single from the album, "Follow God", which contains samples of the recording "Can You Lose by Following God", performed by Whole Truth. The song sees West fighting against his failures linked to Christianity as well as the troubled relationship between him and his real father, the latter of which leads to West considering the meaning of being "Christlike" due to the two of them having an argument.

Within the album's opening track "Every Hour", the Sunday Service Choir implores people to "sing until the power of the Lord comes down." "Selah", the first full track on Jesus Is King, sees West assert his faith. It includes West comparing himself to Noah before the flood. The track also includes a reference to West replacing Yandhi with Jesus Is King due to him having vowed to only put out Christian hip-hop after going through a new birth experience. West references his problematic relationship with both Christianity and his father Ray West on "Follow God." In "Closed on Sunday", West emphasizes the traditional Christian doctrine of Sunday Sabbatarianism, referencing the fast-food chain Chick-fil-A, which he praises for being closed on the Lord's Day in order to allow people to rest. West links the observance of the Christian Sabbath with the "end of imprisonment, slavery, and debt peonage."

"On God" features West "delivering I've-seen-the-mountaintop style preaching," with West being "prodding and unconvincing in a soundscape where he was a compelling idol." Throughout the song, West makes it clear that he must be richer than the clergy. West references the Thirteenth Amendment to the United States Constitution that abolished slavery on "On God" and "Hands On." This followed on from West having previously called for the repeal of the amendment in September and October 2018, which he did because of the penal labor exemption that suggests that the enslavement of convicts is legal. The imagery used in "Water" is a reference to the Christian sacrament of baptism. On "Everything We Need", West delivers "Kanye-isms" about Eve making apple juice, while Ty Dolla Sign and Clemons deliver rapturous vocals. Tension is built between reunited brothers Pusha T and No Malice on "Use This Gospel" as they rap about different stages of self-reflection. The latter had a previous religious transformation where he gave up glorifying drug dealing in his songs. In Jesus Is King, West teaches the doctrine of the Social Kingship of Christ through his advocation of "defying worldly authorities" and "seek[ing] liberty from lower powers by submitting to a higher one."

== Release and promotion ==
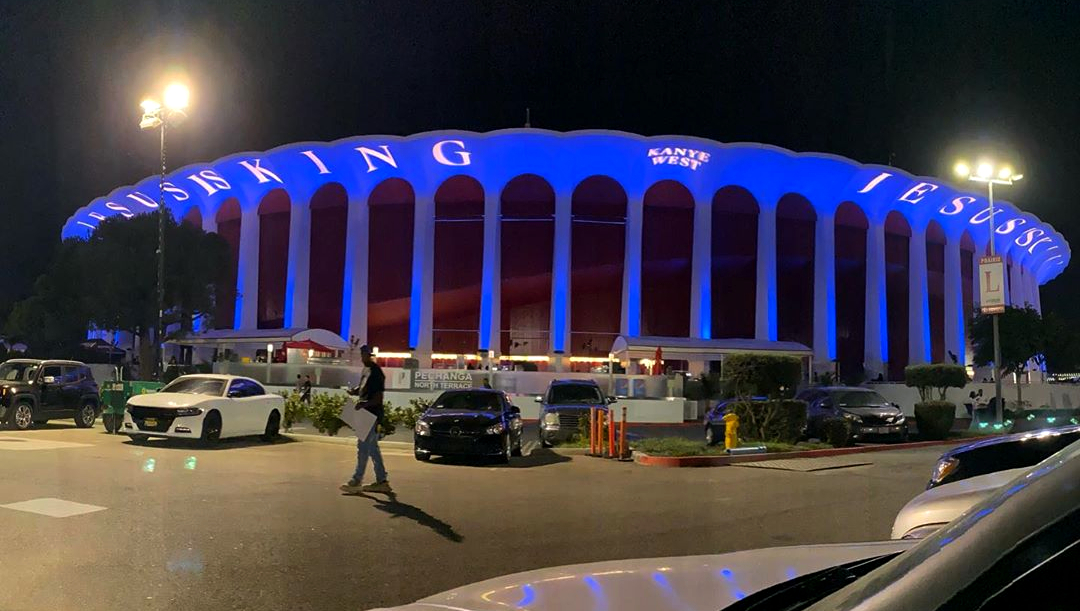
West previewed the album at The Forum in the County of Los Angeles in October 2019.

Originally titled Yandhi, the album was set for release on September 29, 2018, but was postponed to November 23, 2018. West later postponed the album again in the month that it had been first postponed to, though no new release date was set at the time. In January 2019, a representative for West denied a report claiming West was refusing to submit the album to gain leverage in a legal dispute with his record labels GOOD Music and Def Jam. On August 29, 2019, Kardashian announced Jesus Is King with the release date of September 27, of that year, alongside a notebook featuring the track list via Instagram. A representative for West reported to E! News that Jesus Is King would be his "latest album." During a Sunday Service performance on September 16, 2019, West reconfirmed the release date that Kardashian had tweeted out.

On September 27, 2019, following a Sunday Service performance in Detroit, West previewed the album and the accompanying film also entitled Jesus Is King at the Fox Theatre. Kardashian then announced that the former had been pushed back two days to be released on September 29, 2019, stating that mixing had to be finalized and that there'd be two more listening sessions in Chicago and New York. The album also missed that date with no explanation provided by either West or Kardashian. On October 12, 2019, West announced a tentative release date of October 25, 2019, at a Washington, D.C. listening party. West ultimately confirmed via Twitter on October 21 that this was the official release date and pre-ordering for Jesus Is King began the following day. The album and its accompanying film were previewed again at The Forum in the County of Los Angeles on October 23, 2019, for 17,000 attendees, two days before the release of them.

On October 25, 2019, Jesus Is King was released for digital download and streaming by GOOD Music, distributed by Def Jam Recordings. The album's release was simultaneous with that of an accompanying experimental concert short film of the same name, directed by Nick Knight. The film was shot over the summer of 2019 at the Roden Crater in Painted Desert, Arizona, and features the Sunday Service Choir. It was released in IMAX theaters, with numerous tracks from the album being included as part of the soundtrack. Prior to the latter's release, West had performed the song "Water" live with the Sunday Service Choir in April 2019. When premiering the song, West announced it as a new track. "Water" was ultimately released as the seventh track on Jesus Is King in October 2019. Various churches across the state of Texas have revealed that they would not play the album, and it has also been predicted by numerous people involved with Christianity to not be played on Christian radio stations across the state. Jesus Is King was released as a CD in the United States on March 27, 2020, through West's record labels.

The cover art for Jesus Is King is a blue vinyl record, with the album's title and West's name being written at the top and the bottom, respectively. The art contains text on the left reading "New Songs AR 1331 A," while 33RPMLP is written on the right. After confusion of what "AR 1331 A" meant, Third Man Records co-founder Ben Blackwell explained that the text is the Archer Records (AR) pressing plant code assigned to the 1970 A-Side gospel single by Rubye Shelton that consists of "I Want The World To Know Jesus" and "God's Going To Destroy This Nation." At the same time as Jesus Is King being released, West launched "a clothing line depicting Christ blessing the people." After its launch, the Jesus Is King clothing line had sold out. ASAP Rocky and ASAP Mob's creative agency AWGE designed the line, which consists of T-shirts, sweatpants, crewneck sweaters, long sleeves, hats, and socks. The clothing is made from Yeezy cotton garments and each item has either a black or royal blue base, mostly decorated with Bible verses, images of Jesus, and West's lyrics. Some clothing also features gold-colored typographic logos with West's name and the album title, its catalog number AR13331A, and 33RPM LP.

On October 27, 2019, West and his choir performed the first Sunday Service since the album's release at The Forum, with songs from it being performed. Songs from The Life of Pablo were performed as well, which Kardashian referenced on Twitter, while she also tweeted out in excitement over the event. West performed songs from Jesus Is King with his choir in front of inmates at two jails in Houston, Texas, on November 15. On November 16, 2019, it was announced that West would be performing at Joel Osteen's Lakewood Church the next day to promote the album. Simultaneously, tickets were made available for free through Ticketmaster, and were gone within seven minutes. Scalpers immediately began selling them on Twitter and Craigslist at up to $250 each. The event was called the "Sunday Service Experience", with it including West and the Sunday Service Choir performing, though the event was open to fans of all faiths despite being centered around Christianity. Tracks from Jesus Is King were performed alongside material that West released earlier in his career, including "Jesus Walks" (2004). As well as this, gospel remixes were performed of R&B ballads, notably SWV's "Weak" (1993) and Destiny's Child's "Say My Name" (1999).

=== Promotion for Yandhi and leaks ===
West performed the single "I Love It" with Lil Pump and "We Got Love", a duet with Taylor featuring a pre-recorded voice memo by Lauryn Hill, on the season 44 premiere of SNL that coincided with the original release date for Yandhi. West closed the show by performing "Ghost Town" from Ye with Kid Cudi and 070 Shake and giving a speech in support of then-US president Donald Trump. After the SNL performance, full-size costumes from the "I Love It" music video were put up for sale online. West recorded a music video for "We Got Love" with Taylor on October 1, 2018, in the TMZ parking lot, though the music video was never released. West then revealed to TMZ that he had a song about body shaming featuring Minaj and Ty Dolla Sign on Yandhi. The recording of Minaj's verse on the song, entitled "New Body", was prominently showcased in an April 2019 episode of American television series Keeping Up with the Kardashians. Following the airing of the episode, Kardashian discussed the writing of the song on Twitter. "I Love It", "We Got Love", and "New Body" were all initially intended for Yandhi. "We Got Love" was later released as a single by Taylor on December 6, 2019.

In July 2019, tracks dated from a late-December 2018 session of Yandhi began leaking online, including "New Body" featuring Nicki Minaj and Ty Dolla Sign, "The Storm" featuring XXXTentacion, Ty Dolla Sign, and Clemons, a solo track entitled "Spread Your Wings", and demos of "Alien / SpaceX" and "Law of Attraction", with both demos featuring Clemons. The leaks were precipitated by "group buys", which are online money-pooling efforts organized by fans in order to illegally purchase the tracks from artists. Producers who worked on "Law of Attraction" denounced the leak of their track as an "invasion of privacy," while the track was ultimately scrapped and re-recorded as "Use This Gospel" for release on Jesus Is King. Of the Yandhi leaks, Pusha T wrote on Twitter that "it ruins all that we have in store for [you] guys." Paul Thompson, writing for The Fader, noted that the leaks did not receive mainstream attention and were a "minor story" compared to West songs that had leaked previously. Thompson cited factors such as the lukewarm reception of Ye and that songs do not typically enter "popular canon" nowadays unless they're released on streaming services. "Everything We Need" was recorded as a new version of the track "The Storm", with the former being released on Jesus Is King. "New Body" was previewed at Jesus Is King listening parties, but was removed from the final track listing for the album a day before release due to the creative differences between West and Nicki Minaj. In December 2019, the track "Bye Bye Baby" leaked online, featuring opening vocals by American rapper Mykki Blanco.

=== Singles ===
No pre-album singles were released by West for Jesus Is King, with West having not gone through a proper pre-album single release for a while by 2019. A lyric video for "Follow God" premiered on October 26 of that year. On November 5, 2019, the song was selected by West for release as Jesus Is King's lead single in the US. The song was serviced to mainstream radio stations across the United Kingdom on November 8 of the year, through West's record labels as the first single in the UK. That same day, an accompanying music video was released. Within the video, West and his father walk together in snow, while the two of them also drive ATV's in the visual. On November 12, 2019, "Follow God" was sent to US radio stations by West's record labels as the lead single from the album, with West using the common strategy of pushing a track as an album's single after the release. The song reached number seven on the US Billboard Hot 100 prior to release as a single, becoming West's 18th top 10 entry on the chart. Similarly, it peaked at number six on the UK Singles Chart, standing as West's 23rd top 10 single on the chart. On July 20, 2020, "Follow God" was certified platinum in the US by the Recording Industry Association of America (RIAA) for amassing 500,000 certified units. The song was later certified silver by the British Phonographic Industry (BPI) for selling 200,000 units in the United Kingdom on December 11, 2020.

"Closed on Sunday" was released as the second single from Jesus Is King on November 28, 2019. That same day, a music video for the track was released, coinciding with the date of Thanksgiving in the US for that year. The video features West cuddling with Kardashian and the couple's children North, Saint, Chicago, and Psalm West, and the family walk hand-in-hand within the visual. The track debuted at number 17 and 19 on the US Billboard Hot 100 and UK Singles Chart, respectively, before being released as a single. "Closed on Sunday" was certified gold by the RIAA for shelving 500,000 certified units in the US on September 15, 2020.

== Critical reception ==
Professional ratings
Aggregate scores
Source	Rating
AnyDecentMusic?	4.9/10
Metacritic	53/100
Review scores
Source	Rating
AllMusic	2.5/5 stars
Chicago Tribune	2/4 stars
The Daily Telegraph	4/5 stars
Entertainment Weekly	C+
Exclaim!	6/10
The Guardian	2/5 stars
The Independent	2/5 stars
NME	4/5 stars
Pitchfork	7.2/10
Rolling Stone	2.5/5 stars

According to the review aggregator Metacritic, Jesus Is King received "mixed or average reviews" based on a weighted average score of 53 out of 100 from 25 critic scores. Aggregator AnyDecentMusic? gave Jesus Is King 4.9 out of 10, based on their assessment of the critical consensus.

Jordan Bassett from NME wrote of the album: "Where last year's truncated, seven-track 'ye' largely felt sterile and unfinished, a collection of messy, half-realised conceits, here is an album with absolute clarity and confidence." Bassett continued, calling it "concise” by the standards of Kanye West but not one of his "masterworks" like My Beautiful Dark Twisted Fantasy and The Life of Pablo, though asserted that "there's density and focus throughout." McCormick expressed similar feelings, stating that "with gospel choirs, church organs and soulful ululations condensed into a typically bravura tableaux of obscure samples, warped synths and spooky slabs of vocoder harmonies, Jesus Is King sounds as scintillating as anything" from West's discography.

Writing for The New York Times, Jon Caramanica said of the album: "A more engaged and vivid album than 'Ye' from last year, though nowhere as robust as 'The Life of Pablo' from 2016, it is bare-bones and curiously effective," praising the emotion but being less enthusiastic towards the album's structure. Rawiya Kameir from Pitchfork called it "a markedly more cohesive and enjoyable album than I believed him capable of creating at this juncture" but criticized Jesus Is King for being "largely focused on the ways in which religion has served Kanye himself." Sam C. Mac of Slant Magazine was positive towards the production, though panned West's lack of capability to "translate his spiritual awakening to his music as confidently as he has nearly every other experience in his life on previous albums," despite noting that it "isn't the work of a has-been" and "there are flashes of genius throughout."

In a mixed review, Rolling Stone's Brendan Klinkenberg looked at the album as where West is "no longer poking at contradictions, but reveling in a newfound zeal," though concluded by writing that "it will likely be placed alongside ye" in West's discography "as a distinctly lightweight entry" despite being "filled with moments of undeniable brilliance." Greg Kot of the Chicago Tribune stated that West's "element of surprise, conflict and musical tension is largely missing" from Jesus Is King and labeled it as "a pedestrian effort from an artist who was anything but for the first decade of his career," despite pointing to certain gospel moments as "musical sparks" due to "West allowing message to trump musicality."

For The Guardian, Dean Van Nguyen called the album "too slight a record, too lacking in substance, to offer any sense of purification or real insights into West's mind" and branded it as "perfunctory religious discussion that tell us little of God's place in the life of this one believer and almost nothing" about the former's place in the modern world. In another negative review, Wren Graves from Consequence gave the album an "F" rating, viewing it as "27 minutes of cliches, half-finished thoughts, and vaguely religious gesturing," while claiming that the album "feels surprisingly long" and writing: "Ideas develop and fizzle, but nothing sticks."

Veteran critic Robert Christgau found the album "grandiose, self-involved, uninspired, plus there are the underlying politics, which far as I'm concerned verge on evil," while saying of West, "Spiritually he's an egomaniacal shell, and the music is nothing. May he be born again for real, but I'm not holding my breath."

=== Accolades ===
On Rolling Stone's list of the best hip-hop albums of 2019, Jesus Is King was ranked at number 16. The album was listed at the same position on the list of the year's best foreign albums by Afisha Daily, from Russia. Complex named Jesus Is King as the 50th best album of 2019, with Skelton praising the production but criticizing the songwriting, despite concluding that "it's certainly worth a listen" even with some faults. Caramanica ranked the album as the ninth best of the year, complementing it for showing West channeling his older self. Jesus Is King was listed by The Mercury News as the 44th best album of the 2010s, with Jim Harrington writing of it: "Arguably the boldest, bravest album of the decade." Conversely, Jesus Is King has been ranked as the worst Kanye West album by Consequence.

Jesus Is King was nominated for Rap/Hip Hop Album of the Year at the 51st GMA Dove Awards. The album won the awards of Top Christian Album and Top Gospel Album at the 2020 Billboard Music Awards, becoming the first album to ever win both of the awards. At the 63rd Annual Grammy Awards, Jesus Is King was awarded Best Contemporary Christian Music Album. This stood as West's 22nd win at the Grammy Awards, resulting in him briefly tying Jay-Z as the most awarded hip-hop performer in the ceremony's history, though that title was reclaimed again by Jay-Z when he won his 23rd Grammy later that night.

== Sequels ==
Blue orb artwork that would have served as the cover for Jesus is King Part II

In a pre-recorded promotional interview with Zane Lowe released a day before Jesus Is King, West announced that an album by the Sunday Service Choir entitled Jesus Is Born would be released on Christmas 2019. During a special Christmas Eve performance by the Sunday Service Choir, the director Jason White addressed the audience and reconfirmed the album's release date. Jesus Is Born was ultimately released on streaming services for Christmas afternoon on December 25, 2019. Klinkenberg viewed the album as the "companion to Jesus Is King." In May 2020, American cinematographer Arthur Jafa revealed that West's upcoming album would be titled God's Country, which was later renamed to Donda in July 2020 and released in August 2021.

On November 18, 2019, West announced on Twitter that he was working with Dr. Dre on a remix project entitled Jesus Is King Part II. The announcement was posted with a picture of West and Dr. Dre in the studio together. On November 27, 2019, Ronny J confirmed that he had recently been in Wyoming to work on the album. During a December 2019 Sunday Service performance, West stated that he had always wished he could collaborate with Dr. Dre and added, "Who knew all I had to do was do an album for God and then Dr. Dre would start mixing my beats? Spend your time on God, and he'll handle the rest." That same month, Consequence confirmed that he was in Wyoming when asked about recording for Jesus Is King Part II.

On January 16, 2020, a snippet of "Up from the Ashes" was leaked online, featuring production from Dr. Dre. In February 2020, American record producer and Dr. Dre associate Dawaun Parker alluded to his involvement on the album. In March 2020, a reworked version of "LA Monster", featuring production and mixing done by Dr. Dre, leaked online. West reconfirmed the Dr. Dre rework of Jesus Is King on June 26, 2020, as part of his "#WestDayEver" promotion. American rapper Snoop Dogg shared footage of Dr. Dre and West finishing up the album in a recording studio. On July 18, 2020, West briefly shared a track list of his then-upcoming tenth studio album Donda that included "Up from the Ashes" (a song initially intended for the Jesus is King sequel). On September 18, 2020, West announced on Twitter that American rapper Eminem would feature on the remix of "Use This Gospel."

In September 2020, producer Dem Jointz hinted at the possibility of the remix album never surfacing, despite its quality content because, in his own words, West was excited over other different projects that were not the remix album. Despite the lack of news thereafter, a track titled "Glory" featuring Dr. Dre and Snoop Dogg from this album was used in a Beats Electronics commercial that debuted on August 5, 2021. The song "Up From The Ashes", which was originally slated to be a track on Jesus is King Part II, was released officially on November 14, 2021, bundled with the deluxe track listing of Donda. The Eminem remix version of the song "Use This Gospel", also originally intended for Jesus is King Part II, was released within the DJ Khaled album God Did on August 26, 2022.

On September 25, 2023, Jesus Is King II finally surfaced online in leaks. The album featured guest appearances from Eminem, Snoop Dogg, Anderson .Paak, Travis Scott, Pusha T, 2 Chainz, Marsha Ambrosius, and ASAP Ferg.

== Commercial performance ==
On the US Billboard 200, Jesus Is King opened at number one with 264,000 album-equivalent units, of which 109,000 were pure album sales, ranking as the second-largest sales week of 2019 for an R&B/hip-hop album. This gave West his ninth consecutive studio album to debut atop the chart, tying him with a record held by fellow rapper Eminem. The chart-topping position stood as the sixth time that West did so with an album in the 2010s, tying him for second place with fellow rapper Future and Canadian singer Justin Bieber for most number one albums of the decade. The album simultaneously entered atop the US Top Christian Albums and Top Gospel Albums charts. By doing so, Jesus Is King gave West his first appearance on the respective charts and the sales stood as the biggest unit week on both charts. On the US charts, the album became the first to ever top the Billboard 200, Top R&B/Hip-Hop Albums, Top Rap Albums, Top Christian Albums and Top Gospel Albums at the same time. In its second week on the Billboard 200, Jesus Is King did not remain atop the chart, falling to number two with 72,000 album-equivalent units, experiencing a 73% decline in sales. The album was replaced at the top position by rapper Post Malone's third studio album Hollywood's Bleeding, which was number two on the Billboard 200 the previous week, and this marked its fifth week atop the chart. On June 16, 2020, the former was certified gold by the RIAA for pushing 500,000 certified units in the US.

Jesus Is King topped the Canadian Albums Chart with 16,000 total consumption units and 17.9 million on-demand streams that the units were mainly generated through. The album stood as West's seventh number one album in Canada and his second consecutive chart topper. Jesus Is King debuted atop the ARIA Albums chart, giving West his third number one album in Australia and becoming his second consecutive chart topper, while standing as the first time that an album with the word "King" in its title reached the summit. This stood as the 498th time that an album debuted atop the chart, though became the sixth for Def Jam and the 20th to do so in 2019. The reign of the album at the top position continued into its second week on the ARIA Albums chart, giving West his first album to remain at number one for over a week in Australia and also leading to him ranking as 139th on the list of "Accumulated Weeks at No.1: 1965 to 2019", while placing West at number 16 for accumulated weeks at the chart's summit within the 2010s decade. Jesus Is King gave West his second chart-topping solo album in Norway by debuting at number one on the Norwegian Albums Chart. A chart-topping debut was also attained by the album on the Danish Albums chart, standing as West's second chart topper in Denmark. Jesus Is King debuted atop the Estonia Tipp-40, ending the seven-week reign of Hollywood's Bleeding. The album also reached number one in Iceland, Latvia, New Zealand, and Slovakia.

Jesus Is King debuted at number two on the UK Albums Chart, being blocked from the top spot by Welsh rock band Stereophonics' eleventh studio album Kind. However, this gave West his sixth top 10 album on the chart. On March 26, 2021, the album was certified silver by the BPI for sales of 60,000 units in the UK. It entered the Irish Albums Chart at number two, being prevented from becoming a chart topper by Irish singer-songwriter Dermot Kennedy's debut album Without Fear. Despite this, Jesus Is King stood as the highest new entry of the week on the chart and West's sixth top 10 album in Ireland. On the Sverigetopplistan albums chart, the album reached number two, tying with The Life of Pablo for West's highest-charting album in Sweden, while reaching the same position on the Lithuanian Albums chart. In the Netherlands, Jesus Is King peaked at number three on the Dutch Album Top 100. Similarly, the album charted at number four and five on the Finnish Albums and Czech Albums charts, respectively.

All eleven tracks from Jesus Is King charted on the US Billboard Hot 100, with "Follow God" debuting the highest at number seven. This made West the artist with the fifth-most songs in the history of the chart, with his total number of Hot 100 entries amounting to 107, while also leading to him ranking at number one on the US Billboard Artist 100. With the album, West simultaneously became the first artist to monopolize all top 10 spots on the US Christian Songs and Gospel Songs charts, respectively.

== Track listing ==
Track listing and credits adapted from Tidal and the BMI Repertoire. (Note: Credits on the BMI Repertoire can be viewed by searching a song's work number. The following songs have additional credits adapted from the BMI Repertoire: "Every Hour" (BMI #49563338); "Selah" (BMI #40758455); "On God" (BMI #40758456); "Everything We Need" (BMI #40758457); "Use This Gospel" (BMI #40758413))

Jesus Is King track listing
No.	Title	Writer(s)	Producer(s)	Length
1.	"Every Hour" (featuring Sunday Service Choir)	Kanye West; Benjamin Scholefield; Federico Vindver; Nikisha Grier	West; Budgie; Vindver	1:52
2.	"Selah"	West; Cydel Young; Dexter Raymond Mills Jr.; Vindver; Gene Thornton; Jahmal Gwin; Jeffrey LaValley^{[c]}; Rennard East; Terrence Thornton; Evan Mast; Matthew Leon; John Boyd; Adam Wright	West; E*vax; BoogzDaBeast^{[a]}; Vindver^{[a]}; Benny Blanco^{[b]}; Francis Starlite^{[b]}	2:45
3.	"Follow God"	West; Gwin; Bryant Bell; Aaron Butts; Curtis Eubanks^{[d]}; Calvin Eubanks^{[d]}	West; BoogzDaBeast; Xcelence	1:45
4.	"Closed on Sunday"	West; Angel Lopez; Brian Miller; Vindver; Timothy Mosley; Chango Farías Gómez^{[e]}; G. Thornton; East; T. Thornton; Victory Elyse Boyd	West; Lopez; Brian "AllDay" Miller; Vindver; Timbaland	2:32
5.	"On God"	West; Gwin; Michael Cerda; Jordan Timothy Jenks; Vindver; Young; Dijon Isaiah McFarlane	West; BoogzDaBeast; Cerda; Pi'erre Bourne^{[a]}; Vindver^{[b]}	2:16
6.	"Everything We Need" (featuring Ty Dolla Sign and Ant Clemons)	West; Tyrone Griffin Jr.; Anthony Clemons; Michael Mulé; Isaac DeBoni; Ronald Spence Jr.; Gwin; Vindver; Mike Dean; Bradford Lewis; Young; Josh Berg; Gerard A. Powell	West; FNZ; Ronny J; BoogzDaBeast^{[a]}; Vindver^{[a]}; Dean^{[b]}	1:56
7.	"Water" (featuring Ant Clemons)	West; Clemons; Gwin; Lopez; Vindver; Mosley; Alexander Nelson Klein; Bruce Haack^{[f]}; V. Boyd	West; BoogzDaBeast; Lopez^{[a]}; Vindver^{[a]}; Timbaland^{[a]}	2:48
8.	"God Is"	West; Warryn Campbell; Timothy Lee McKenzie; Lopez; Vindver; V. Boyd; Robert Fryson^{[g]}	West; Campbell; Labrinth; Lopez^{[a]}; Vindver^{[a]}	3:23
9.	"Hands On" (featuring Fred Hammond)	West; Fred Hammond; Lopez; Vindver; Mosley; Butts	West; Lopez; Vindver; Timbaland	3:23
10.	"Use This Gospel" (featuring Clipse and Kenny G)	West; G. Thornton; T. Thornton; Kenneth Bruce Gorelick; Lopez; Michael Suski; Vindver; Mosley; Gwin; Jenks; Derek Watkins; East; Leon	West; Lopez; DrtWrk; Vindver; Timbaland; BoogzDaBeast^{[a]}; Bourne^{[a]}	3:34
11.	"Jesus Is Lord"	West; Lopez; Miller; Claude Léveillée^{[h]}; Vindver; Mosley	West; Lopez; Miller; Vindver; Timbaland	0:49
Total length:				27:04

=== Notes ===
- ^{^[a]} signifies a co-producer
- ^{^[b]} signifies an additional producer

==== Sample credits ====
- ^{^[c]} "Selah" contains samples of "Revelations 19:1" from Jesus Is Born, originally performed by the New Jerusalem Baptism Choir under the direction of Curtis Hayes and Jeffrey LaValley.
- ^{^[d]} "Follow God" contains samples of "Can You Lose By Following God", written by Johnny Frieson, Curtis Eubanks, and Calvin Eubanks, and performed by Whole Truth.
- ^{^[e]} "Closed on Sunday" contains samples of "Martín Fierro", written by Chango Farías Gómez and performed by Grupo Vocal Argentino.
- "On God" contains samples of "Lambo", written and performed by YB; and "Oh My God", written by Jonathan Davis, Ali Shaheed Muhammad, Trevor Smith, and Malik Taylor, and performed by A Tribe Called Quest featuring Busta Rhymes.
- ^{^[f]} "Water" contains samples of "Snow Job", written and performed by Bruce Haack.
- ^{^[g]} "God Is" contains samples of "God Is", written by Robert Fryson and performed by James Cleveland and the Southern California Community Choir.
- "Use This Gospel" contains samples of "Costume Party", written and performed by Two Door Cinema Club.
- ^{^[h]} "Jesus Is Lord" contains samples of "Un Homme Dans La Nuit", written by Claude Léveillée.

== Personnel ==
Credits adapted from Tidal.

=== Musicians ===
- Sunday Service Choir – additional vocals (1, 2, 6, 7)
- Ant Clemons – additional vocals (2, 7)
- Bongo ByTheWay – additional vocals (2)
- Bradford Lewis – guitar (6)
- Federico Vindver – uncredited vocals (7)
- Labrinth – additional vocals (8)
- Kenny G – saxophone (10)
- Jesse McGinty – tuba (11), trombone (11), trumpet (11), saxophone (11), French horn (11), euphonium (11)
- Mike Cordone – trumpet (11)

=== Engineers ===
- Josh Berg – recording (all tracks)
- Josh Bales – recording (all tracks)
- Shane Fitzgibbon – recording (1, 2, 6, 7)
- Zack Djurich – recording (2, 6)
- Jesse Ray Ernster – recording (2, 6)
- Steven Felix – recording (2)
- Randy Urbanski – recording (2–11)
- Jamie Peters – recording (2, 6–9)
- Andrew Drucker – recording (2–7, 10–11)
- Federico Vindver – mixing (1)
- Mike Dean – mixing (2–4, 6–11), mastering (all tracks)
- Jess Jackson – mixing (2–4, 6–11)
- Manny Marroquin – mixing (5, 11)
- Chris Galland – mix engineering (5, 11)
- Sage Skolfield – assistant mixing (4, 6)
- Sean Solymar – assistant mixing (4, 6)
- Robin Florent – assistant mixing (5, 11)
- Scott Desmarais – assistant mixing (5, 11)
- Jeremie Inhaber – assistant mixing (5, 11)

== Charts ==
=== Weekly charts ===
Chart performance for Jesus Is King
Chart (2019)	Peak position
Australian Albums (ARIA)	1
Australian Urban Albums (ARIA)	1
Austrian Albums (Ö3 Austria)	9
Belgian Albums (Ultratop Flanders)	6
Belgian Albums (Ultratop Wallonia)	20
Canadian Albums (Billboard)	1
Czech Albums (ČNS IFPI)	5
Danish Albums (Hitlisten)	1
Dutch Albums (Album Top 100)	3
Estonia (Eesti Tipp-40)	1
Finnish Albums (Suomen virallinen lista)	4
French Albums (SNEP)	16
German Albums (Offizielle Top 100)	19
German Albums (Top 20 Hip Hop)	4
Icelandic Albums (Tónlistinn)	1
Irish Albums (IRMA)	2
Italian Albums (FIMI)	18
Japan Hot Albums (Billboard Japan)	75
Latvian Albums (LAIPA)	1
Lithuanian Albums (AGATA)	2
New Zealand Albums (RMNZ)	1
Norwegian Albums (VG-lista)	1
Scottish Albums (Official Charts)	44
Slovak Albums (ČNS IFPI)	1
Swedish Albums (Sverigetopplistan)	2
Swiss Albums (Schweizer Hitparade)	8
UK Albums (Official Charts)	2
UK Christian & Gospel Albums (Official Charts)	1
UK R&B Albums (Official Charts)	1
US Billboard 200	1
US Soundtrack Albums (Billboard)	1
US Top Christian Albums (Billboard)	1
US Top Gospel Albums (Billboard)	1
US Top R&B/Hip-Hop Albums (Billboard)	1

=== Year-end charts ===
Year-end chart performance
Chart (2019)	Position
Australian Albums (ARIA)	89
Dutch Albums (MegaCharts)	92
Icelandic Albums (Tónlistinn)	49
Latvian Albums (LAIPA)	58
US Billboard 200	141
US Soundtrack Albums (Billboard)	7
US Top Christian Albums (Billboard)	2
US Top Gospel Albums (Billboard)	1
US Top R&B/Hip-Hop Albums (Billboard)	51

Year-end chart performance
Chart (2020)	Position
US Billboard 200	197
US Soundtrack Albums (Billboard)	5
US Top Christian Albums (Billboard)	2
US Top Gospel Albums (Billboard)	1
US Top R&B/Hip-Hop Albums (Billboard)	79

Year-end chart performance
Chart (2021)	Position
US Top Christian Albums (Billboard)	14
US Top Gospel Albums (Billboard)	3

Year-end chart performance
Chart (2022)	Position
US Top Christian Albums (Billboard)	19
US Top Gospel Albums (Billboard)	5

Year-end chart performance
Chart (2023)	Position
US Top Christian Albums (Billboard)	28
US Top Gospel Albums (Billboard)	5

Year-end chart performance
Chart (2024)	Position
US Top Christian Albums (Billboard)	23
US Top Gospel Albums (Billboard)	5

Year-end chart performance
Chart (2025)	Position
US Top Christian Albums (Billboard)	16
US Top Gospel Albums (Billboard)	5

== Certifications ==
Certifications and sales
Region	Certification	Certified units/sales
Denmark (IFPI Danmark)	Gold	10,000^{‡}
United Kingdom (BPI)	Silver	60,000^{‡}
United States (RIAA)	Platinum	1,000,000^{‡}
^{‡} Sales+streaming figures based on certification alone.

== Release history ==
Release dates and formats
Region	Date	Format(s)	Label	Ref.
Various	October 25, 2019	Digital download; streaming	GOOD; Def Jam	
United States	March 27, 2020	CD	GOOD; Def Jam	
United States	May 1, 2020	Vinyl	GOOD; Def Jam	
United States	November 1, 2019	Cassette	GOOD; Def Jam	

== See also ==
- 2019 in hip-hop
- Christ the King
- List of Billboard 200 number-one albums of 2019
- List of Billboard number-one R&B/hip-hop albums of 2019
- List of Billboard Top Christian Albums number ones of the 2010s
- List of Billboard Top Christian Albums number ones of the 2020s
- List of number-one albums from the 2010s (Denmark)
- List of number-one albums from the 2010s (New Zealand)
- List of number-one albums in Norway
- List of number-one albums of 2019 (Australia)
- List of number-one albums of 2019 (Canada)
- List of UK R&B Albums Chart number ones of 2019
- List of UK top-ten albums in 2019
