= Jesus Is Lord =

Song by Kanye West

from the album Jesus Is King
- Released: October 25, 2019
- Genre: Gospel
- Length: 0:49
- Label: GOOD; Def Jam
- Songwriters: Kanye West; Angel Lopez; Brian Miller; Claude Léveillée; Federico Vindver; Timothy Mosley
- Producers: Kanye West; Angel Lopez; Brian "AllDay" Miller; Federico Vindver; Timbaland

"Jesus Is Lord" is a song by American vocalist and record producer Kanye West from his ninth studio album, Jesus Is King (2019). The song was produced by West, Angel Lopez, Brian "AllDay" Miller, Federico Vindver, and Timbaland. The producers wrote it alongside Claude Léveillée, who had a songwriting credit added due to the song sampling his work. A gospel track, it contains samples of "Un Homme Dans La Nuit", performed by Léveillée. Lyrically, the song features West performing a chorus that sees him echo the reaction of men and women to the Last Judgement.

The song received mixed reviews from music critics, who were generally divided in their assessments of West's performance. Critical commentary was positive towards the composition of "Jesus Is Lord" from some, though numerous reviewers were dissatisfied with the song's short length. On the US Billboard Hot 100, it charted at number 63. The song also reached numbers 10 and 11 on the US Christian Songs and Gospel Songs charts, respectively. West performed it repeatedly during a Sunday Service concert in October 2019. An extended version of the song entitled "Every Knee Shall Bow", which includes horns, was used for the album's accompanying film of the same name.

== Background ==
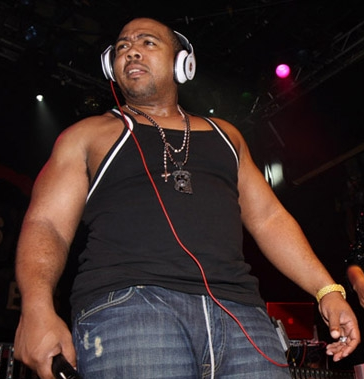
American record producer and West collaborator Timbaland contributed both writing and production to the song.

In December 2018, West's collaborator Timbaland and Argentine record producer Federico Vindver took part in recording sessions with numerous rappers in Miami, including Saweetie and Lil Mosey. West had arrived at the sessions in under 24 hours, with Vindver recalling that he and Timbaland were "blown away" when West started "playing tracks for the Yandhi project". (Note: Yandhi was ultimately scrapped and replaced with Jesus Is King.) Vindver detailed the collaborative process between West and Timbaland, saying: "Timbaland would freestyle with him in the studio — Tim on the drum machine, Kanye singing in real time. He wanted to make more healing music at that time. But he was still finding what it was." West and Timbaland were reported to be recording together in Miami again durimg January 2019 for completion of the album, alongside rappers Lil Wayne, 2 Chainz, and YNW Melly, among others. In addition to "Jesus Is Lord", Timbaland contributed production to Jesus Is King tracks "Closed on Sunday", "Water", "Hands On", and "Use This Gospel". Timbaland produced the song with West, Angel Lopez, Brian "AllDay" Miller, and Vindver.

Since French-Canadian actor and musician Claude Léveillée had died eight years before 2019, West sampling "Un Homme Dans La Nuit" (1978) within "Jesus Is Lord" meant that he used a posthumous sample of Léveillée. Through an American law firm, the sample source's original publisher Peermusic were made aware of West's usage. On their Facebook page, the independent record label Audiogram questioned how West found "Un Homme Dans La Nuit" despite it not being available on streaming services. Éditorial Avenue creative director Guillaume Lafrance was surprised by West using the sample, with him confessing to not "know how Kanye came across this work" as well as questioning if someone suggested it to him or if West "stumbled upon it by chance in a store?" As a result of the sample, Léveillée received credit on the song as a writer. It was also written by West, Lopez, Miller, Vindver, and Timbaland. West shared the track list for the album on October 24, 2019, showing "Jesus Is Lord" to be set for release on it.

== Composition and lyrics ==
Musically, "Jesus Is Lord" is a gospel track. The horns and piano of the song are sampled from the recording "Un Homme Dans La Nuit", as performed by Léveillée. Five seconds are sampled of the recording, from 1:52 to 1:57 of it. The song features a trumpet, contributed by Jesse McGinty and Mike Cordone. McGinty also played the euphonium, French horn, saxophone, trombone, and tuba for the song.

The message of the song spreads the gospel. The lyrics also reference Philippians 2:10-11 of the Bible, looking towards the return of Jesus in the future. The song consists of West singing a chorus, in which he requests, "Every knee shall bow / Every tongue confess." After this, West proclaims "Jesus is Lord" twice in the chorus. West sings the chorus two times over in the song.

== Release and reception ==
"Jesus Is Lord" was released on October 25, 2019, as the eleventh and final track on West's ninth studio album Jesus Is King. The song was met with mixed reviews from music critics, who often had split feelings of West's vocals. Writing for The Herald-Standard, Clint Rhodes called the song "short and direct in reference to every believer's call to spread the gospel message" due to West's performance. The Daily Telegraph writer Neil McCormick viewed West "proclaiming 'Jesus Is Lord'" as surprising, since West "once rapped that he'd 'rather be a [dick] than a swallower.'" Luke Hinz from HotNewHipHop complimented the song's "beautifully layered horn arrangement", which he described as serving "to usher out West and his collaborators on bended knee". Despite pointing out its "much-too-short" length, Sam C. Mac of Slant Magazine labeled the song a "triumphant, brassy fanfare" and questioned it being the "most baroque production" from West since his fifth studio album My Beautiful Dark Twisted Fantasy (2010). God Is in the TV's Aidy James Steven felt the song is "gone as soon as it's arrived, disappearing suddenly into the ether". Steven continued, analyzing West as doing this because he would "rather leave you wanting more than with too much to digest", while admitting that the song "could have perhaps been elaborated upon or cut without consequence" and he concluded by dubbing it "a pleasant enough back cover to Kanye's Bible".

Carl Lamarre from Billboard gave "Jesus Is Lord" a mixed review, ranking the song as the sixth best track on Jesus Is King and citing it as "equally compelling" in comparison to the album's "triumphant" opener "Every Hour". He elaborated, highlighting the horns that "provide a glorious, champion-like feel", though slammed the song's short length as well as the lack of a verse from West. In Pitchfork, Sheldon Pearce complained that the song is too-short and admitted that its "message may be new" even though the delivery is "anything but", while he asserted the song "could flow seamlessly into the sampled horns" on West's single "Touch the Sky" (2006). For Consequence, Wren Graves stated the song "seems to stop, unresolved, in the middle of a thought". Will Rosebury from Clash dismissed the song's placement on Jesus Is King" as "a short outro". In a highly negative review, Ed Power from The Irish Times said that as the album closes at last with the song, "fans will indeed wonder if Kanye might not have done better overruling his pastor and hanging up his mic".

== Commercial performance ==
Following the album's release, the song debuted at number 63 on the US Billboard Hot 100. "Jesus Is Lord" entered the US Christian Songs chart at number 10, rounding out the top 10 of the chart that fully consisted of entries from Jesus Is King. Similarly, the song reached number 11 on the US Gospel Songs chart. On the US Billboard Hot R&B/Hip-Hop Songs chart, it debuted at number 31.

In Canada, the song charted at number 65 on the Canadian Hot 100. "Jesus Is Lord" performed best in Australia, peaking at number 55 on the ARIA Singles Chart. The song was less successful on the Lithuanian Top 100, reaching number 90 on the chart. It further charted at number 38 on the UK R&B Chart.

== Live performances and other usage ==
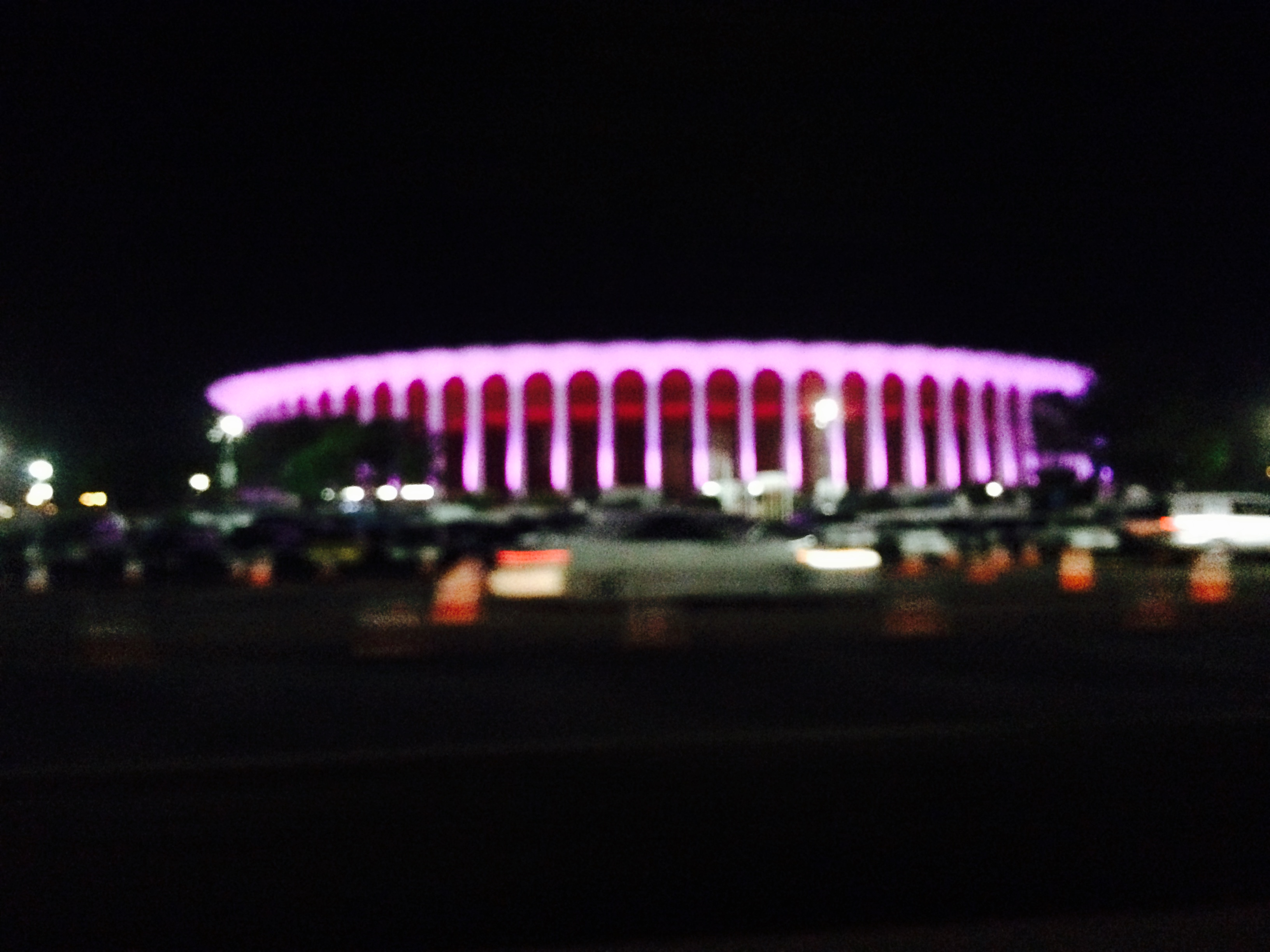
Kanye delivered consecutive performances of the song for a concert at The Forum, Inglewood, during which North West repeated after him at points.

As part of a concert by his gospel group the Sunday Service Choir on October 27, 2019 at The Forum in Inglewood, California, West delivered repeated performances of "Jesus Is Lord". Kanye brought his daughter North West on stage while performing and she sang lyrics from the track after him. Kanye West stated during the performance, "LA put your hands up this is our final song!" At the same concert, the Sunday Service Choir's director Jason White led the crowd through a performance of the track. The crowd stretched out their arms, closed their eyes, and demonstrated worship. For West and the Sunday Service Choir's concert at Bethany Rose Church in Baton Rouge, Louisiana on November 1, 2019, they performed the track live.

An alternate version of the track, titled "Every Knee Shall Bow", is included in the concert film Jesus Is King, which was released simultaneously with the album of the same name. The version is featured in the closing credits of the film, though had not been included on the pre-release track listing. It is a horn-infused track, which is reminiscent of the original version and includes the lyrics, "Every knee shall bow/Jesus is Lord." (Note: "Jesus Is Lord" features the lyrics, "Every knee shall bow/Jesus is Lord.")

== Credits and personnel ==
Credits adapted from Tidal.

- Kanye West – producer, songwriter
- Angel Lopez – producer, songwriter
- Brian "AllDay" Miller – producer, songwriter
- Federico Vindver – producer, songwriter
- Timbaland – producer, songwriter
- Claude Léveillée – songwriter
- Mike Dean – mastering engineer, mixer
- Jess Jackson – mixer
- Manny Marroquin – mixer
- Chris Galland – mix engineer
- Jeremie Inhaber – assistant mixer
- Robin Florent – assistant mixer
- Scott Desmarais – assistant mixer
- Andrew Drucker – recording engineer
- Josh Bales – recording engineer
- Josh Berg – recording engineer
- Randy Urbanski – recording engineer
- Jesse McGinty – euphonium, French horn, saxophone, trombone, trumpet, tuba
- Mike Cordone – trumpet

== Charts ==
=== Weekly charts ===
Chart performance for "Jesus Is Lord"
Chart (2019)	Peak position
Australia (ARIA)	55
Canada Hot 100 (Billboard)	65
Lithuania (AGATA)	90
UK Hip Hop/R&B (Official Charts)	38
US Billboard Hot 100	63
US Hot Christian Songs (Billboard)	10
US Gospel Songs (Billboard)	11
US Hot R&B/Hip-Hop Songs (Billboard)	31
US Rolling Stone Top 100	25

=== Year-end charts ===
2019 year-end chart performance for "Jesus Is Lord"
Chart (2019)	Position
US Christian Songs (Billboard)	68
US Gospel Songs (Billboard)	20

2020 year-end chart performance for "Jesus Is Lord"
Chart (2020)	Position
US Christian Songs (Billboard)	81
US Gospel Songs (Billboard)	25
