= Jesus Is King (film) =

2019 American concert film by Kanye West

- Theatrical release poster
- Directed by: Nick Knight
- Written by: Kanye West
- Based on: Jesus Is King by Kanye West
- Produced by: Jonathan Josell; Kanye West
- Starring: Kanye West; Sunday Service Choir
- Music by: Kanye West; Sunday Service Choir
- Production company: Def Jam Recordings
- Distributed by: IMAX
- Release date: October 25, 2019
- Running time: 38 minutes
- Country: United States
- Language: English
- Box office: $1.1 million

Jesus Is King is a 2019 American experimental concert short film written by rapper Kanye West and directed by Nick Knight. Featuring gospel songs arranged by West and material from his ninth studio album of the same name, it also serves as an album companion piece. Primarily shown through a circular eye and features differing shots of the Sunday Service Choir performing music, as well as various Bible verses, West only appears briefly and performs his material towards the end.

Jesus Is King was shot at Roden Crater of Arizona's Painted Desert in the summer of 2019, intended as a tribute to the Sunday Service Choir. West shared two trailers in October 2019 and that same month, a screening was held in Manhattan. The premiere occurred exclusively at IMAX theaters across the world on October 25, accompanying the album's release. $1.1 million was grossed in total and the screenings sold out in 24 cities. The film received lukewarm reviews from critics, who generally highlighted the Sunday Service Choir's contributions. Some praised the location and West's lack of focus on himself, though numerous critics observed an unclear concept.

== Plot ==
The scenes of Jesus Is King are mostly shown through a circular eye and throughout the film, West's gospel group, the Sunday Service Choir, is shown performing music inside Roden Crater from various angles, while numerous Bible verses are also displayed. A drone shot from above the location appears at the beginning, which gradually pulls away from it. The biblical quote "the time is fulfilled, and the kingdom of God is at hand: Repent and believe the gospel" from Mark 1:15 of the Gospel of Mark is displayed, followed by the camera zooming out from inside a keyhole. A bright version of the keyhole then appears and the camera zooms in on it, leading into an oval that slowly changes into the circular eye. The Sunday Service Choir appear first, wearing identical brown costumes as they enter a stone room that the skylight shines on through the roof's natural lens. West walks in alongside the group, though he does not perform initially, and the room is filled with religious ritual and color as the scenes progress. The circular eye shows shots of nature, including mountains, a deer, and a flower. West performs at a late point in Jesus Is King after only appearing briefly, singing "Street Lights" while sweeping the floor with a broom and wearing the same costume as the Sunday Service Choir members. The film concludes with a close-up shot of Kanye shirtless as he cradles his son Psalm West and sings "Use This Gospel" to him.

== Production ==
On September 27, 2019, at a listening event for the album in Detroit's Fox Theatre, Kanye West revealed a film set to accompany his ninth studio album Jesus Is King. At the time, his wife Kim Kardashian had announced the film's title as Jesus Is Lord on her Instagram stories. On September 29, 2019, IMAX issued a press release announcing their collaboration with West for the release of a concert film of the same name to accompany the album on October 25. The press release said that the film was shot in the summer of 2019 and pays tribute to the Sunday Service Choir at the Roden Crater. IMAX's release described the location as "visionary artist James Turrell's never-before-seen installation in Arizona's Painted Desert"; the artist modified its core to feature a naked-eye observatory.

Jesus Is King features songs arranged by West in a gospel style and music from the album, fully "presented in the immersive sound and stunning clarity of IMAX". The film uses a few tracks from the record: "Selah", "Everything We Need", "Use This Gospel", and an alternate version of "Jesus Is Lord" entitled "Every Knee Shall Bow". It includes an interpolation of the refrain of the gospel track "Ultralight Beam" from West's 2016 album The Life of Pablo, as well as revised versions of "Say You Will" and "Street Lights" from 808s & Heartbreak (2008). Old works are performed by the Sunday Service Choir in a gospel style: "O Fortuna", "Perfect Praise", "When I Think of His Goodness", "More Abundantly", "Count Your Blessings", and "Alleluia", the fifth of which was eventually included on their album Jesus Is Born on December 25, 2019. Prior to starring in Jesus Is King, the Sunday Service Choir had been assembled by West for weekly performances throughout 2019. IMAX President Megan Colligan issued a statement about collaborating with West, saying that the company took "an opportunity to create a cultural moment with a visionary artist" for expanding their brand. She added that IMAX were "surprising audiences and experimenting with what we can bring to our platform beyond blockbusters".

Roden Crater remained under construction at the time of West filming there, having been worked on by Turrell for around 40 years. In 2018, West toured the crater multiple times after he made trips across the United States to see Turrell's art and in December, he revealed his first pilgrimage to the location. West subsequently took conference calls with the artist and spent time with him inside a piece named "Perfectly Clear" at the Massachusetts Museum of Contemporary Art, a month before the rapper donated US$10 million to help finish Roden Crater. He also spoke about his appreciation of Turrell's work, saying that "one day, we'll all be living in Turrell spaces" and his lights "turn you into a zen state".

On October 17, 2019, British fashion photographer Nick Knight was announced as the director of Jesus Is King. He had worked with West in the past, shooting the music videos for his 2013 singles "Black Skinhead" and "Bound 2". Discussing collaborating with the rapper in an October 2019 interview, Knight drew a heavy comparison to how he worked with fashion designer Alexander McQueen, after "understanding his world and his desires". He explained that they are both intricate, spirited, kind, and oftentimes misrepresented by the media wanting to simplify answers to highly complex questions. Knight declared West was uninterested in being centre stage and recalled the rapper saying Jesus Is King "isn't a film that is about me, [it] is a film about worship - that's a universal thing", elaborating that his "lack of ego and modest humility" was significant to him not being the main star, feeling he was presenting an unseen vision of West "about emotion and integrity". Jesus Is King served as a companion piece to the album, following West's 2010 film Runaway that was released for his fifth studio album My Beautiful Dark Twisted Fantasy as his second film for a record. West explained in a voiceover of a trailer for Jesus Is King that its purpose was Christian evangelism, not entertainment: "We're here to spread the gospel. I'm not here for your entertainment. I'm an evangelist, so my music, my films, every conversation, every room I go in, we're here to save souls, save you from eternal damnation. I use art to make believers."

== Marketing ==
The film's official poster was posted by Knight to Instagram on September 29, 2019. The poster was designed by Turrell and depicts Roden Crater. On October 17, 2019, West shared the first trailer for Jesus Is King that is soundtracked by a choir's reinterpretation of "Say You Will" with new lyrics and slightly over a minute long. A temple-like illustration of Roden Crater appears while the choir sing, with the setting showing stairs that lead out to a light and as the trailer progress, the camera zooms in on this. The trailer then ends with a quote from Mark 1:15, reading: "In the words of Jesus Christ, 'The time is fulfilled, and the Kingdom of God is at hand, repent and believe in the gospel.'"

On October 19, 2019, West released a trailer consisting of behind-the-scenes footage from Jesus Is King, which runs for almost two minutes and uses a slow drum beat. It begins by displaying the same quote from the first trailer, before cutting to West walking up a hill as he explains the religious purpose of the film in a voiceover. He and his crew are shown assembling the camera outside Roden Crater, after which the Sunday Service Choir perform at the location. This is followed by footage of West in an editing room reciting the Mark quote. Turrell also makes an appearance in the trailer, speaking with the rapper.

== Release ==
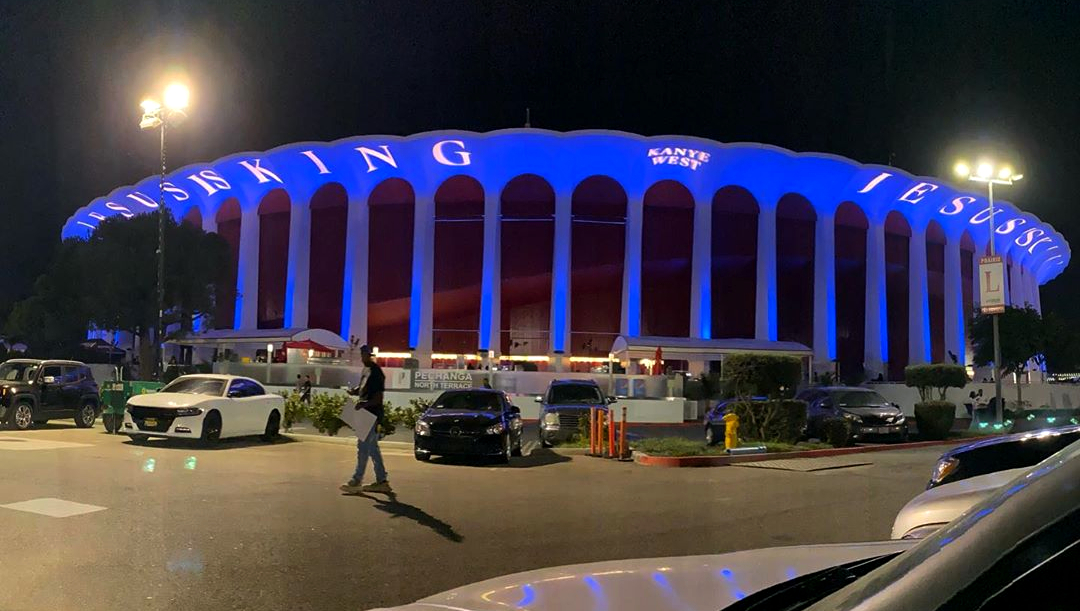
Jesus Is King was previewed as part of a listening event for the album of the same name at The Forum in Inglewood, California.

Excerpts from Jesus Is King were shown during listening parties for the album in Detroit, Chicago, and Inglewood on September 27, September 28, and October 23, 2019, respectively. While presenting a preview at the September 27 event, West said that it would premiere through IMAX in October 2019. At The Forum in Inglewood on October 24, a buzzing of bugs crescendeoed to signify the beginning of the preview as the large screen lit up. West stood amongst the audience for the screening and at the end, he walked out of the crowd. On October 24, 2019, the first full screening of the film was held at AMC Lincoln Square in Manhattan, beginning at 7 p.m. after the lights dimmed. On October 25, 2019, Jesus Is King premiered exclusively in IMAX theaters across the world, accompanying the album's release after a series of delays. In June 2020, West tweeted an announcement of a digital release of the film on iTunes. However, as of September 2026, the film has yet to be given an official digital release.

== Reception ==
=== Box office ===
Jesus Is King grossed $973,000 in the US and $109,629 in other territories, making for a worldwide total of $1,082,629. On October 18, 2019, IMAX tickets were made available via cinema homepages and West's website, priced between $10 and $19.75. The film generated a worldwide opening of $1.03 million, reaching the top 10 in its first week and grossing $862,000 in North America, alongside $175,000 across international markets. Jesus Is King was shown at a per-screen average of $2,317 in 440 IMAX theaters worldwide, 372 of which were in North America and the remaining 68 were in 12 international markets. The screenings sold out in 24 cities worldwide, including US locations like New York, Los Angeles, and Chicago, as well as international capitals such as London, Copenhagen, and Mexico City.

=== Critical response ===
Jesus Is King was met with lukewarm reviews from critics. On the review aggregator website Rotten Tomatoes, 83% of six critics gave the film a positive review, with an average rating of 5.6/10. At Metacritic, it received an average score of 61, based on four reviews.

Writing for TheWrap, Todd Gilchrist viewed the film as "largely and predictably" appealing almost entirely to West's fanbase, asserting the performances are "more staged" and "abbreviated" than the Sunday Service Choir's concerts. He also noted West's musical and spiritual growth while praising the focus on the music. David Ehlrich from IndieWire graded the film a B−, praising the lack of appearances from West in favor of the Sunday Service Choir, its spiritual immersion, and the diverse production design. He and Gilchrist lamented its short runtime, even though it is his first work for a long time that could have been evocative. Ehlrich noted Jesus Is King's contradictoriness due to being equally "reverent and narcissistic, humble and grandiose", calling it "both a tribute to the Lord and a testament to West's unparalleled ability to get in his own damn way". Luke Morgan Britton of NME gave the film three stars out of five, seeing that West's "sublime but flawed visual journey stops short of enlightenment", declaring it truly represents him with its themes of "a search for the sublime, the striving for a better future, the awe-inspiring power of nature," with "a stripped-back, minimalist approach". He complimented the music, cinematography, Sunday Service Choir's presence, and advantageous lack of appearances from West, though noted that the film did not reach its full potential.

The Atlantic's Spencer Kornhaber complimented how the film's religious ethos is established early and the group's performances, while feeling impressed by the minimalism and the mixture of "ancient spiritual signifiers" with the unique tones and shapes of West's Adidas Yeezy clothing line. He commented that West does not explain his conversion to Christianity and saw it merely as aesthetic atmosphere, saying his attempt to spread his faith is "oddly cold" and also calling the film bland. In a mixed review for Vulture, Alison Willmore saw its sole audience as West's hardcore fans, noting how the experimental film "feels too ethereal to bear up under much solo scrutiny" and pales in comparison to Runaway due to the lack of a clear narrative or concept. She assured the authorship of Jesus Is King is entirely West's through "a mix of ecstatic spirituality and artistic wankery", seeing it as resembling "a frustrated attempt at conveying a concentrated version of its born-again creator's experiences" that culminates in West focusing on himself. Willmore went on to praise the location, with Britton calling it aligned with West's spiritualism", and make lukewarm comments about the Sunday Service Choir's contributions.
