= On God =

Song by Kanye West

from the album Jesus Is King
- Released: October 25, 2019
- Genre: Electronic
- Length: 2:16
- Label: GOOD; Def Jam
- Songwriters: Kanye West; Jahmal Gwin; Michael Cerda; Jordan Timothy Jenks; Federico Vindver; Cydel Young; Dijon Isaiah McFarlane
- Producers: Kanye West; BoogzDaBeast; Michael Cerda; Pi'erre Bourne

"On God" is a song by the American rapper Kanye West from his ninth studio album, Jesus Is King (2019). The song's production was handled by West, BoogzDaBeast, and Michael "CameOne" Cerda, with co-production from Pi'erre Bourne and additional production from Federico Vindver. The producers served as co-writers alongside Cyhi the Prynce and Mustard. Cerda formed the song's melody in 2017, utilizing a Prophet Rev 2 and Moog Sub 37. Young Thug indicated an appearance, though he ultimately did not make the final cut. An electronic track with gospel and house elements, it relies on synths and features an interpolation of "Mercy" by West, Big Sean, Pusha T, and 2 Chainz.

Lyrically, the song features West delivering the gospel about his life with the newfound context of Christianity. "On God" received moderately positive reviews from music critics, who mostly commended the production. They often focused on the synths, though critical commentary towards West's rapping was somewhat negative. The song was one of the Award Winning Gospel Songs at the 2021 BMI Gospel Awards. It reached number 23 on the US Billboard Hot 100 and charted within the top 50 in eight other countries, including Canada and Latvia. The song has been certified gold in the United States by the Recording Industry Association of America (RIAA).

== Background ==
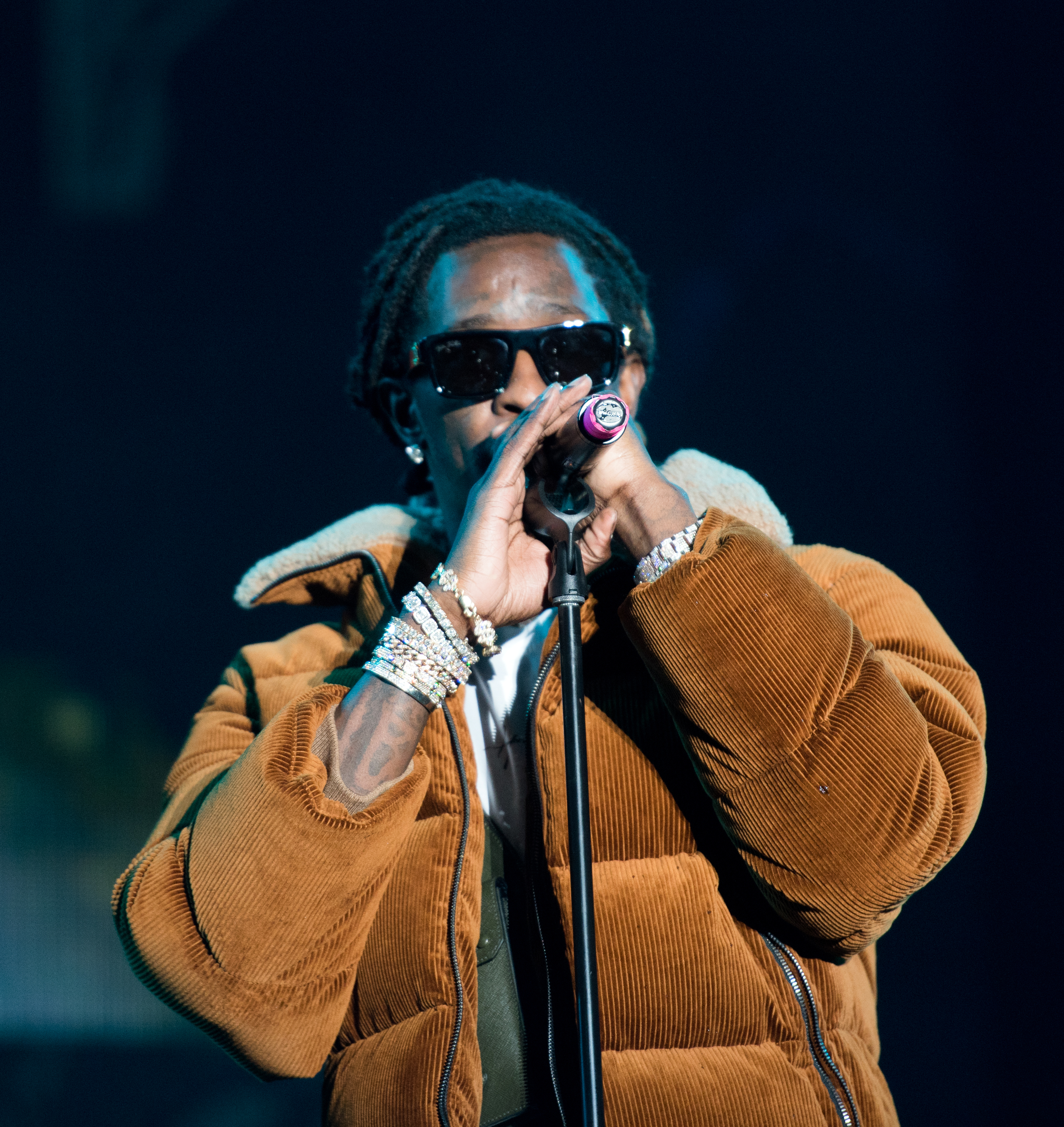
Young Thug suggested over Twitter that he would appear on the song, though he was ultimately not featured.

American record producer Michael "CameOne" Cerda developed a passion for music production in 2007, being inspired by his friend and mentor Alex Vazquez to create beats daily. The producer later connected with a representative from West's record label GOOD Music in 2019 and subsequently received a text message about a sample package he made, "Hold this for Ye." Cerda experienced disbelief and shock after reading the text and in the summer of 2019, the representative confirmed that he would be a contributor to Jesus Is King. He revealed that "On God" was originally composed by him in 2017 before he knew the song would be on the album, crafting the melody on a Prophet Rev 2 and Moog Sub 37. Cerda also said he was inspired by his love for synth heavy melodies and for the sample's creation process, he began with the arpeggiator and mostly worked with The Legend plugin, using FL Studio 11. The song was produced by West, BoogzDaBeast, and Cerda, with co-production from record producer Pi'erre Bourne and additional production from Federico Vindver. The producers co-wrote it with Cyhi the Prynce and Mustard. (Note: Find additional credits for the song on the BMI Repertoire by searching the work number #40758456.)

In 2016, fellow rapper Young Thug contributed vocals to West's seventh studio album The Life of Pablo. On September 18, 2018, shortly after West announced his then-upcoming album Yandhi, the rapper tweeted in response that if not featured on it, he will never speak to him again and ended the tweet with "#OnGod". West's wife Kim Kardashian later revealed a track list for Jesus Is King on September 27, 2019, including "On God". Speculation began that the track was to include a feature from Young Thug due to the title, after Yandhi had been scrapped. During a listening session for the album in New York City on September 29, 2019, vocals from the rapper were not included. However, Young Thug asked West over Twitter if his "verse about the devil" was still on Jesus Is King three days later, marking the first time he tweeted to him since September 2018. West did not reply that same day and the rapper ultimately failed to make the final cut. Prior to referencing the Constitution of the United States' 13th Amendment that freed the slaves on "On God", West had controversially said in 2018 that slavery "was a choice". He met with 2017–2021 US President Donald Trump that same year and suggested to "abolish" the amendment while wearing a Trump hat, stating that it is similar to "a trap door", so should not be part of the constitution. West explained how the writers of the 13th Amendment "didn't look like the people they were amending" and it was illegal for any black Americans to read at the time, meaning that reading the amendment led to "get[ting] locked up and turned into a slave". In September 2023, West's remix album Jesus Is King Part II with record producer and fellow rapper Dr. Dre leaked online, featuring a version "On God" with altered production.

== Composition and lyrics ==
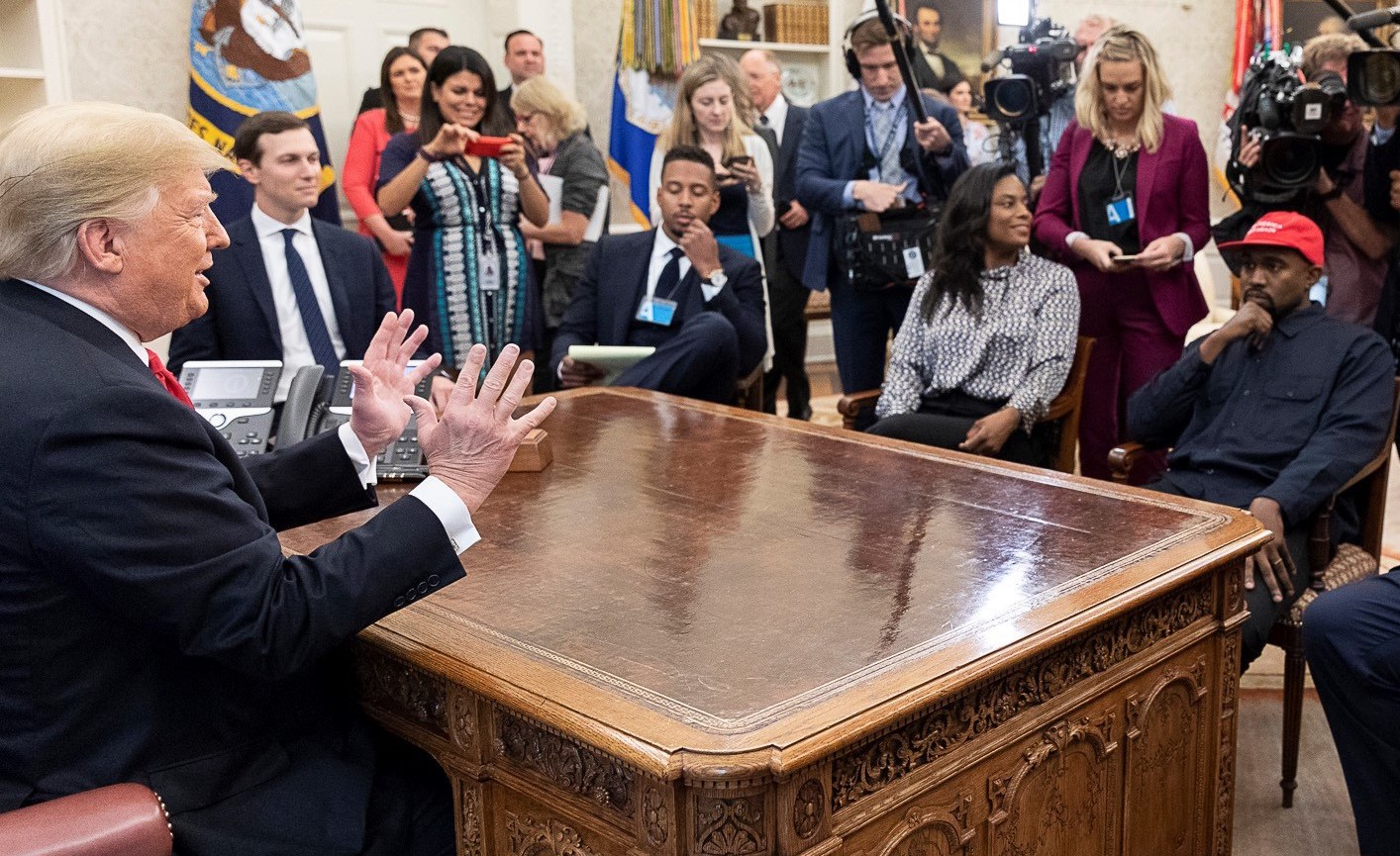
West references the 13th Amendment to the United States Constitution on the song, which he discussed during a meeting with Donald Trump in 2018.

Musically, "On God" is an electronic track, with elements of gospel and house music. It stands as a contrast from other tracks on Jesus Is King, going against the primarily gospel and hip hop style. The song samples the line "Yo Pi'erre, you wanna come out here?" from the American sitcom The Jamie Foxx Show, using it as Pi'erre Bourne's producer tag. Its melody is reliant on lush synths from Cerda, which crescendo and were described as reminiscent of West's third studio album Graduation (2007). According to AllMusic writer Neil Z. Yeung, the song contains "digital swirling". Trap drops and loud drums are also featured. West's rapping is accompanied at times by an interpolation of his 2012 collaborative single "Mercy" with Big Sean, Pusha T, and 2 Chainz, which in turn samples YB's "Lambo" from the same year.

In the lyrics of "On God", West preaches the gospel about his life within the context of Christianity after converting to it. He focuses on how religion has served him, using lines such as "How you got so much favor on your side?/'Accept him as your lord and savior,' I replied". West also mentions the 13th Amendment, referencing his slavery comments and highlighting his stance on prison reform by rapping he has "gotta end it". The rapper uses his taxes paid to the Internal Revenue Service (IRS) to excuse pricing his merchandise and Yeezy sneakers highly, justifying the prices to feed his family and not have to appear on the TV series Dancing with the Stars.

== Release and reception ==
On October 25, 2019, "On God" was included as the fifth track on West's ninth studio album Jesus Is King. The song was met with moderately positive reviews from music critics, with general praise for the production. Cyclone Whener from The Music highlighted the song's combination of gospel and house music, noting that it sometimes recalls the era of Daft Punk's Discovery (2001) and going on to compliment West's progressive lyricism. At musicOMH, Ben Devlin declared that the song "dazzles with shiny synth textures". Echoing this sentiment, Jordan Bassett of NME wrote it "shimmers with space-age synths". Writing for Spectrum Culture, Daniel Bromfield cited the song as including "one of the great Pi'erre Bourne beats". In Rolling Stone, Brendan Klinkenberg lauded the beat's "effervescent triumph". Will Rosebury from Clash observed that the song is able "to thematically balance out" through West touching on "his life within the context of his new found faith", while NOW Magazine's Matthew Progress praised his prison reform stance for offering a left-wing political position. In a lukewarm review for The Independent, Roisin O'Connor picked it as a "rare standout" on the album for West's referencing of the 13th Amendment and "the Grammys' latency at recognising black artists", yet criticized him rapping against division when that "is all he seems to be doing" as a whole. Alphonse Pierre expressed mixed feelings in Pitchfork, declaring that West's skills "as a studio curator and beatmaker haven't completely waned" and positively comparing the song's synths to Graduation, though noted his "sloppy rapping" and called the lyrical content "self-sacrifice at its most self-absorbed". Similarly, Entertainment Weekly's Brian Josephs said that the "glitzy synths" are reminiscent of the album, yet complained of West preaching too heavily. Z. Yeung highlighted the "digital swirling" of the production, while disregarding West's "troubling alignment with prosperity gospel teachings" as embarrassing.

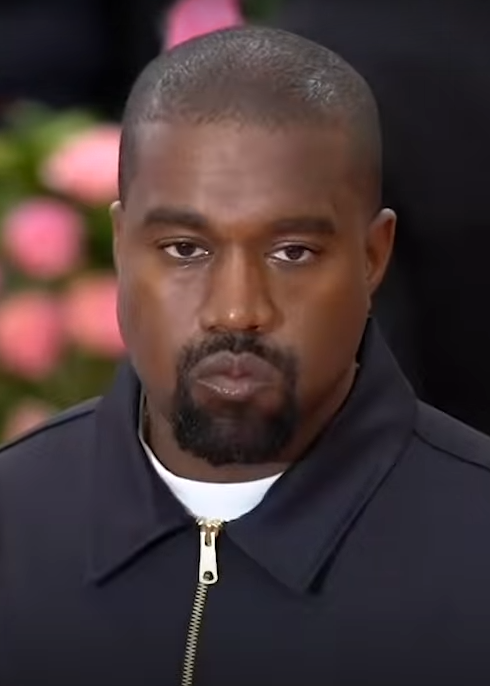
A number of reviewers criticized West's verse, with some panning his lyricism and a few citing a lack of originality.

Some reviews were negative. Wren Graves from Consequence derided the song as "twinkling cheese"; he branded it "a dollar-store ripoff" of West's 2010 single "All of the Lights" and was disappointed in the lyrical content that "feels less than sincere", despite coming across as promising. The staff of No Ripcord assured that the rapper using "excuses to charge high prices to feed his family" makes him sound like "a petulant rich man who needs to justify his outrageous choices". On a similar note, RapReviews' Ryan Feyre said West "prays about not letting his family starve" while not realizing "he's a part of the richest family in the entertainment industry", seeing his excuse for high prices as weak. In a review of Jesus Is King for Variety, Andrew Barker named "On God" one of the worst tracks and criticized West's lyricism. Steven Edelstone provided a highly negative review at Paste, picking the "party-happy" song as one of the album's low points and stating West "attempts to defend his expensive clothing" on what is supposed to be "a spiritual anthem".

"On God" was nominated for Top Gospel Song at the 2020 Billboard Music Awards, ultimately losing the award to fellow album track "Follow God". At the 2021 BMI Gospel Awards, the former stood among the Award Winning Gospel Songs.

== Commercial performance ==
Upon the release of Jesus Is King, "On God" entered the US Billboard Hot 100 at number 23. The song lasted for two weeks on the Hot 100. It charted identically on the US Christian Songs and Gospel Songs charts, debuting at number four on both. The song also entered the US Hot R&B/Hip-Hop Songs chart at number 12. On September 1, 2021, "On God" was certified gold by the Recording Industry Association of America (RIAA) for amassing 500,000 certified units in the US.

"On God" charted similarly to its US performance in Canada and Australia, debuting at number 21 on both the Canadian Hot 100 and the ARIA Singles Chart. The song was most successful in Latvia, reaching number 18 on the Latvian Singles Chart. In Iceland and Estonia, it charted at numbers 24 and 28 on the Icelandic Singles Chart and Eesti Tipp-40, respectively. The song also peaked within the top 50 in Denmark, Lithuania, and Portugal.

== Credits and personnel ==
Credits adapted from Tidal and the BMI Repertoire.

- Kanye West – production, songwriter
- BoogzDaBeast – production, songwriter
- Michael Cerda – production, songwriter
- Jordan Timothy Jenks – co-production, songwriter
- Federico Vindver – additional production, songwriter
- Cydel Young – songwriter
- Dijon Isaiah McFarlane – songwriter
- Mike Dean – mastering engineer
- Manny Marroquin – mixer
- Chris Galland – mix engineer
- Jeremie Inhaber – assistant mixer
- Robin Florent – assistant mixer
- Scott Desmarais – assistant mixer
- Andrew Drucker – recording engineer
- Josh Bales – recording engineer
- Josh Berg – recording engineer
- Randy Urbanski – recording engineer

== Charts ==
=== Weekly charts ===
Chart performance for "On God"
Chart (2019)	Peak position
Australia (ARIA)	21
Canada Hot 100 (Billboard)	21
Czech Republic Singles Digital (ČNS IFPI)	80
Denmark (Tracklisten)	34
Estonia (Eesti Ekspress)	28
France (SNEP)	89
Greece International Digital Singles (IFPI)	64
Iceland (Tónlistinn)	24
Latvia (LAIPA)	18
Lithuania (AGATA)	34
Netherlands (Single Top 100)	90
Portugal (AFP)	48
Slovakia Singles Digital (ČNS IFPI)	80
Sweden (Sverigetopplistan)	75
UK Hip Hop/R&B (Official Charts)	17
US Billboard Hot 100	23
US Hot Christian Songs (Billboard)	4
US Gospel Songs (Billboard)	4
US Hot R&B/Hip-Hop Songs (Billboard)	12
US Rolling Stone Top 100	5

=== Year-end charts ===
2019 year-end chart performance for "On God"
Chart (2019)	Position
US Christian Songs (Billboard)	43
US Gospel Songs (Billboard)	8

2020 year-end chart performance for "On God"
Chart (2020)	Position
US Christian Songs (Billboard)	52
US Gospel Songs (Billboard)	7

== Certifications ==
Certifications and sales for "On God"
Region	Certification	Certified units/sales
United States (RIAA)	Gold	500,000^{‡}
^{‡} Sales+streaming figures based on certification alone.

== Notes and references ==
Notes

Citations
