= Hands On (song) =

2019 song by Kanye West

Song by Kanye West featuring Fred Hammond

from the album Jesus Is King
- Released: October 25, 2019
- Recorded: 2019
- Genre: Gospel; Minimalism
- Length: 3:23
- Label: GOOD; Def Jam
- Songwriters: Kanye West; Fred Hammond; Angel Lopez; Federico Vindver; Timothy Mosley; Aaron Butts
- Producers: Kanye West; Angel Lopez; Federico Vindver; Timbaland

"Hands On" is a song by American rapper Kanye West from his ninth studio album, Jesus Is King (2019). The song features a guest appearance from gospel singer Fred Hammond. It was produced by West, Angel Lopez, Federico Vindver, and Timbaland, all of whom served as co-writers with Hammond and Aaron Butts. West initially freestyled and envisioned the song, recording an 18-second basic track. He sent Hammond a vocal track, to which the singer wrote his verse. A minimalist gospel ballad with elements of R&B, the song features a low-key beat.

Lyrically, the song is focused on West's conversion to Christianity and the judgement of him from other Christians. "Hands On" received mixed reviews from music critics, who mostly criticized West's performance. They often singled out his lyrical style, though certain reviewers praised the production and Hammond's appearance. The song reached number 60 on the US Billboard Hot 100, marking Hammond's first entry on the chart. It peaked at numbers 49 and 63 on the ARIA Singles Chart and Canadian Hot 100, respectively.

== Background ==
West decided to crossover as an outsider to gospel by featuring Fred Hammond on Jesus Is King, collaborating with a key insider from the new genre for a proper transition. Hammond had previously worked with fellow rapper Snoop Dogg on his gospel material in 2018 and the next year, he appreciated a loop of his track "This Is the Day" by West that he was sent over Instagram. The two subsequently met through Kirk Franklin at Chance the Rapper's wedding, talking about West's version of the track and the rapper also told Hammond he was enthusiastic to collaborate.

During the summer of 2019, West began working with Hammond, engaging in a phone call focused on this, with him stating the rapper "knew a lot of the Christian world would not embrace him". In reference to any backlash, he stated: "If they don't sing gospel exclusively, then you are trying to cross over, you're a hypocrite, God don't love you no more." Hammond heavily defended West against any doubters and this encouraged him to create music, after which he sent the singer a track of him singing "hands on, hands up" that he then wrote his verse to. The singer explained to West that his verse about deserving criticism "was a strong basis for a song" because he should take this route as a believer, further recalling that his son was shocked when they worked together. Hammond also revealed that West's support of Donald Trump's presidency was not an issue for him, denying any political discussion during their work together.

== Recording ==
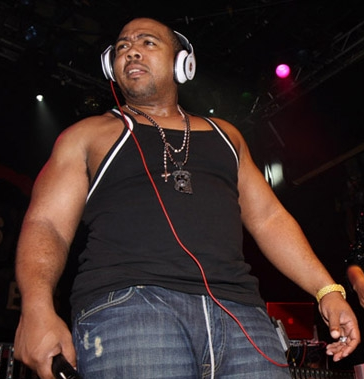
American record producer and West collaborator Timbaland contributed both writing and production to the song.

In December 2018, West engaged in last-minute sessions with Timbaland, Federico Vindver and Angel Lopez for his then-upcoming album Yandhi. (Note: Yandhi was ultimately scrapped and replaced with Jesus Is King.) Co-producer Federico Vindver recalled that Timbaland would freestyle with West in the studio; the record producer played the drum machine that West sang in time with.

West and Vindver were later reunited in the 2019 summer to work on Jesus is King, with him declaring that the rapper "brought faith back into my life". During the sessions, West would engage in multiple freestyles and say what he could hear going with them after listening back, going through this process for the creation of the track. West delivered 12 a cappella songs, spending three minutes sitting on a bench to record each with 5 to 10 second breaks before moving into another song. Specifically for "Hands On", West recorded a basic 18-second track, about which Vindver said, "When I heard the melody, I heard chords in my head to go with it, and put in a crazy sound effect on his vocal. It was lo-fi, but Kanye heard it, and he loved it."

== Composition and lyrics ==
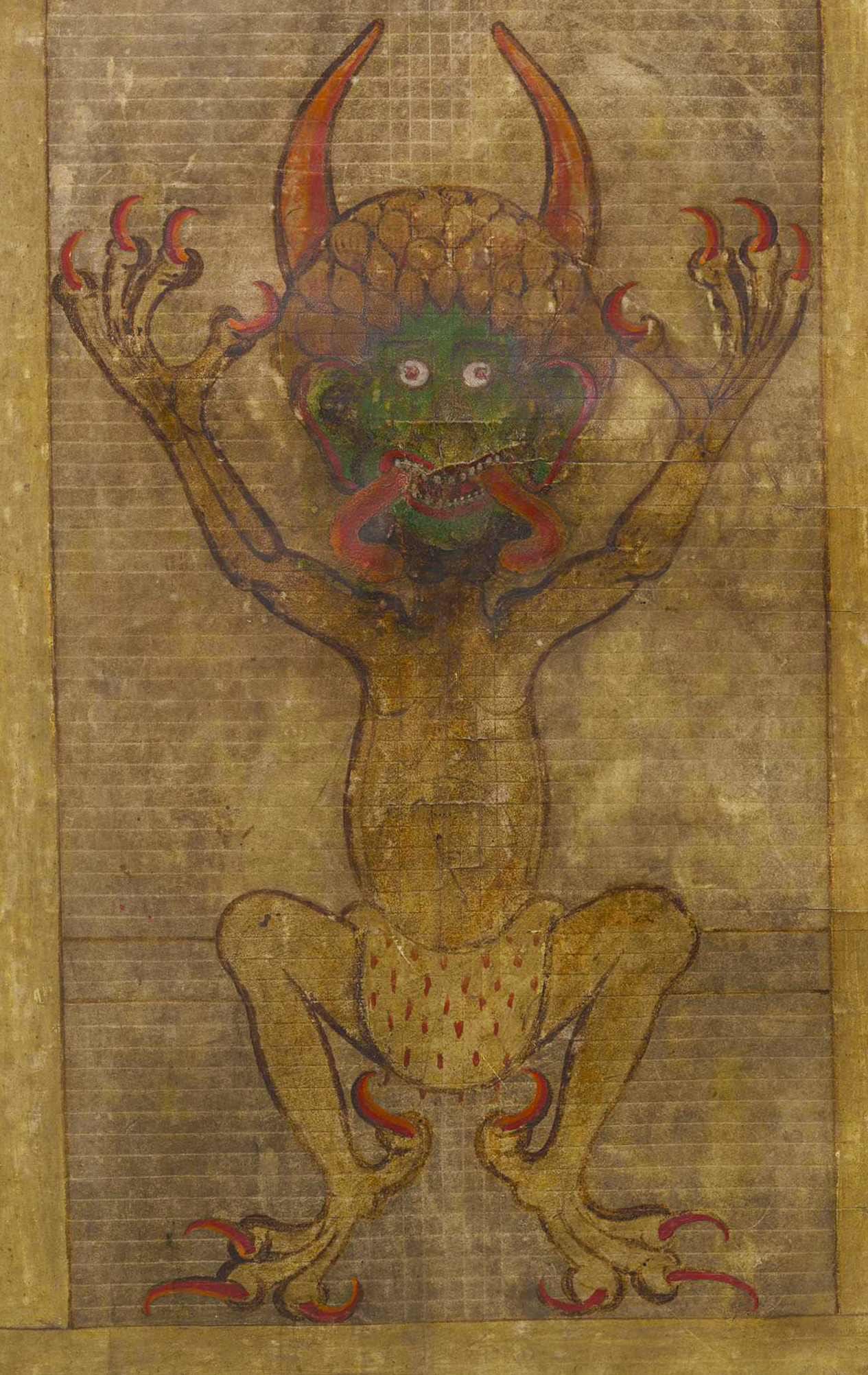
The song includes West rapping about redemption from the Devil, declaring himself as on a strike against the figure after an entire life working for him.

Musically, "Hands On" is a minimalist gospel ballad, with elements of R&B. It has a soft beat that is set in a low-key, marking a change from Timbaland's usual bouncy production style. The song features chords and coos, which accompany West's vocals. Its outro is performed by Hammond, who utilizes Auto-Tune.

In the lyrics of the song, West complains about fellow Christians judging him after his conversion to their religion, addressing their uncertainty around his intentions. West engages in a call-and-response with himself, asking "Said I'm finna [sic] do a gospel album/What have you been hearin' from the Christians?" and replying with, "They'll be the first one to judge me." He later reuses the response line when angrily accusing his doubters of hypocrisy, following with an additional line: "Make it feel like nobody love me." West also touches on finding redemption from the Devil, rapping that he told him "I'm going on a strike" and "when I see him, on sight", confessing he has been working for the figure his entire life. Hammond sings the line "I deserve all the criticism you got", which he described as Jesus' message about humility.

== Release and reception ==
On October 25, 2019, "Hands On" was included as the ninth track on West's ninth studio album Jesus Is King. Kim Kardashian, West's wife at the time, first shared a track list for the album in August 2019, including the song as the seventh track. The following month, Kardashian posted a track list showing it set for release as the ninth and penultimate track. On September 29, 2019, West previewed "Hands On" during a listening event at the United Palace theater in the New York City neighbourhood Washington Heights for his mini-tour Jesus Is King: A Kanye West Experience. It was played as the penultimate track and Hammond's feature was revealed.

"Hands On" was met with mixed reviews from music critics, with general criticism of West's vocals. Wren Graves was highly negative at Consequence; he cited the song as "the worst of the many meandering rants" on the album, singling out the heavy lack of rhythm or flow and writing off West's rhymes as so simplistic that they "would get a person hissed out of a poetry slam". Carl Lamarre from Billboard named it as the record's worst track, commenting that even though West "plays the sidelines and allows production savant, Timbaland, to run point", the two "land a dud on their mistimed collaboration". Lamarre also admitted that them collaborating "seems fantastic" on paper and noted the repetitiveness of West's lyrics, attributing this to him "rapping about rebuking the Devil for the umpteenth time". Writing for AllMusic, Neil Z. Yeung saw that the rapper shows "his grasp of Christ's teachings is elementary" as he addresses those questioning his "true intentions". HipHopDX's Aaron McKell wrote off West's weak lyricism on the song due to his focus on the religious message, declaring that he is "forgetting to be a clever MC" and rapping plainly. Daniel Bromfield of Spectrum Culture pointed to the song as an example of him sounding "cowed and vulnerable". Entertainment Weekly critic Brian Josephs expressed less negative feelings, not being surprised by the song being about West like much of Jesus Is King, saying the rapper disguises his "insecurities as heathen" and demonstrates "some supposed righteousness" in his struggle as usual. However, he wrote that West "delivers a testimonial over warm chords and coos", yet he does not have the necessary self-reflection "to give his words emotional depth".

Ben Devlin was more mixed in musicOMH; he noted that the song's "lush and minimal" production is "completely beatless", but viewed West's rambling of sorts as resembling fellow rapper will.i.am "at his most awkward". For Variety, Andrew Barker praised the song's "moody, low-key beat" and Hammond's feature, yet felt West ruins it with his "persecution complex" by "fall[ing] into a sour funk whining" about other Christians judging him. Aidy James Stevens from God Is in the TV called the song "a stripped-back affair" and said the main purpose is "a vehicle for Ye's frustrations" with Christians judging him after beginning his religious conversion, naming it "a vital part of the narrative" in the context of a concept album. He explained that the song is not a particularly essential number, concluding how it could have possibly "been elaborated upon". Time's Andrew R. Chow named the song as the strongest of Jesus Is King, commenting that West "waves at th[e] idea" of gospel songs being "driven by transformation, in which sinners hit rock bottom before receiving a glimmer of hope". R. Chow also stated that the song benefits from Hammond's usage of auto-tune, though observed how West "raps about not being accepted by other Christians" rather than further integrating "his own struggle with police brutality and America's three-strikes law". In a glowing review for NOW Magazine, Matthew Progress wrote the song contains "some of the most captivating melodies ever found on a West project" and noted it as part of the album's "vein of R&B-leaning, wavy church ballads" that begins with the vocals on "Everything We Need".

== Commercial performance ==
Following Jesus Is King's release, "Hands On" entered the US Billboard Hot 100 at number 60, becoming Hammond's first appearance on the chart. Simultaneously, the song reached number 9 on the US Christian Songs chart. It debuted at number 10 on the US Gospel Songs chart, rounding out the chart's top 10 that was fully occupied by entries from the album. The song also charted at number 29 on the US Hot R&B/Hip-Hop Songs chart.

Elsewhere in North America, the song reached number 63 on the Canadian Hot 100 in Canada. "Hands On" experience its strongest performance in Australia, entering the ARIA Singles Chart at number 46. The song charted similarly in Lithuania to Canada, peaking at number 64 on the Lithuania Top 100. It peaked at numbers 77 and 87 on the Portuguese Singles Chart and Singles Digitál Top 100 in Portugal and Slovakia, respectively.

== Credits and personnel ==
Credits adapted from Tidal.

- Kanye West – producer, songwriter
- Angel Lopez – producer, songwriter
- Federico Vindver – producer, songwriter
- Timbaland – producer, songwriter
- Fred Hammond – songwriter, featured artist
- Aaron Butts – songwriter
- Mike Dean – mastering engineer, mixer
- Jess Jackson – mixer
- Jamie Peters – recording engineer
- Josh Bales – recording engineer
- Josh Berg – recording engineer
- Randy Urbanski – recording engineer

== Charts ==
=== Weekly charts ===
Chart performance for "Hands On"
Chart (2019)	Peak position
Australia (ARIA)	46
Canada Hot 100 (Billboard)	63
France (SNEP)	177
Lithuania (AGATA)	64
Portugal (AFP)	77
Slovakia Singles Digital (ČNS IFPI)	87
UK Hip Hop/R&B (Official Charts)	32
US Billboard Hot 100	60
US Hot Christian Songs (Billboard)	9
US Gospel Songs (Billboard)	10
US Hot R&B/Hip-Hop Songs (Billboard)	29
US Rolling Stone Top 100	21

=== Year end charts ===
2019 year-end chart performance for "Hands On"
Chart (2019)	Position
US Christian Songs (Billboard)	62
US Gospel Songs (Billboard)	19

2020 year-end chart performance for "Hands On"
Chart (2020)	Position
US Christian Songs (Billboard)	72
US Gospel Songs (Billboard)	17

== Notes and references ==
Notes

Citations
