= Roden Crater =

Volcanic cone in Arizona, United States

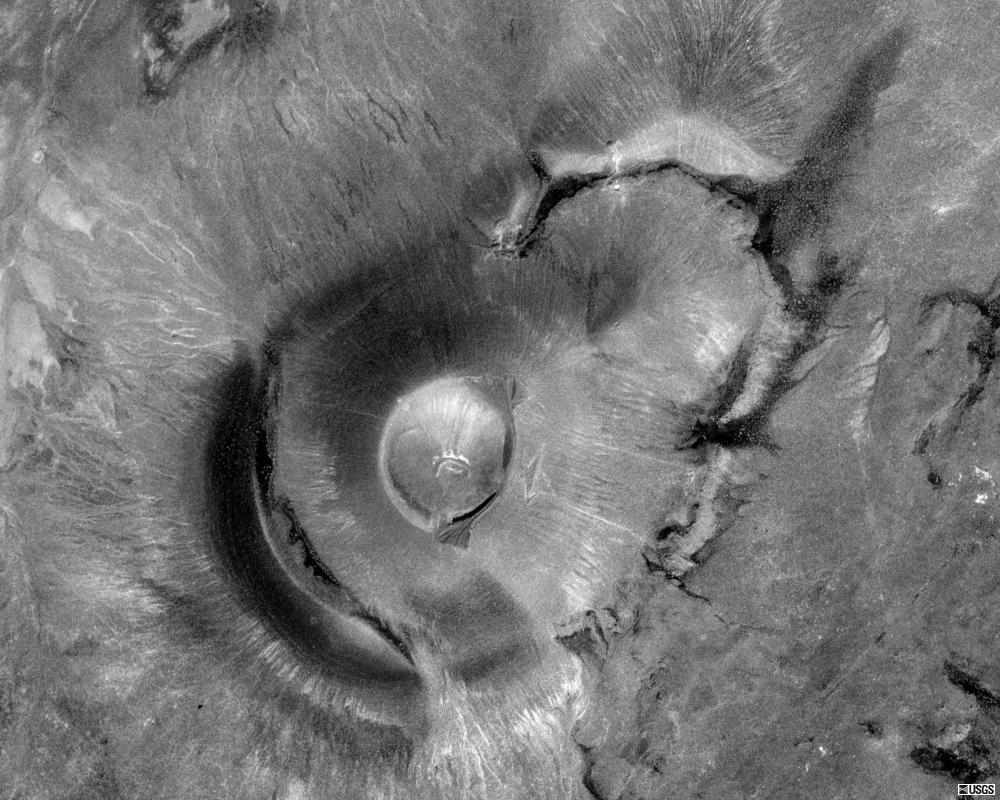
- Satellite view of Roden Crater, site of an earthwork in progress by James Turrell outside Flagstaff, Arizona.

Highest point
- Elevation: 5,443 ft (1,659 m) NAVD 88
- Prominence: 470 ft (143 m)
- Coordinates: 35°25′31″N 111°15′33″W

Geography
- Location within the United States Location within Arizona
- Location: Coconino County, Arizona, U.S.
- Topo map: USGS Roden Crater

Geology
- Volcanic field: San Francisco volcanic field

Roden Crater is a cinder cone type of volcanic cone from an extinct volcano, with a remaining interior volcanic crater. It is located approximately 50 miles northeast of the city of Flagstaff in northern Arizona, United States.

== Art project ==
For the past several decades, Roden Crater has been the site of a large-scale land art project by artist James Turrell. Turrell acquired the 400,000-year-old, 3-mile-wide (4.8 km) crater's land in 1977 with the aim of transforming the inner cone of the crater into a massive naked-eye observatory, designed specifically for viewing and experiencing sky-light, solar, and celestial phenomena. The fleeting winter and summer solstice events will be highlighted.

Roden Crater demonstrates Turrell’s long interest in light, sky, and human perception. He drew on his aviation experience, studies in visual psychology, and research on ancient observatories to shape the project. The tunnels and chambers guide natural light and frame certain sky events such as rain, sunny, and stormy conditions, which emphasizes changes in color, depth, and visual response. Museums describe Roden Crater as a large, controlled environment for observing light and space. Adcock also notes that the site works like a simple observatory that helps people focus on how their eyes react to natural light.

The first phase of construction included the excavation of over 1.3 million cubic yards (993,921 cubic meters) of earth to shape the Crater Bowl and the construction of the 854 ft (260 m) Alpha (East) Tunnel. When complete, the project will contain 24 viewing spaces and six tunnels.

Kanye West filmed his 2019 movie Jesus Is King at Roden Crater.

In 2019, Arizona State University partnered with James Turrell to collaborate on the project with the help of a $1.8 million gift. The project, referred to as the "ASU-Roden Crater Project" at ASU, is currently centered at the Herberger Institute for Design and the Arts, and hopes to foster interdisciplinary collaboration between the arts and sciences. Courses at ASU, including one titled "Indigenous Stories and Sky Science" taught by Professor Dalla Costa have already begun including the Roden Crater into their curriculum.

== Future ==
The Dia Art Foundation is continuing to advocate for the development of James Turrell's Roden Crater project in the Painted Desert in Arizona which was begun in the 1970s with Dia's support. James Turrell, who purchased the Roden Crater in 1979, had plans to open the crater for public viewing in 2011, then later tentatively set the opening for 2024. As of August 2025, the New York Times reported that Roden Crater was still unfinished.

== 2015 fundraising tours ==
A one-time fundraising event held from May 14 to 17, 2015, allowed visitors to tour Roden Crater for a cost of $6,500 to Turrell's nonprofit organization.

== See also ==
- Environmental art
- Environmental sculpture
- Site-specific art
- List of cinder cones
